= How to Steal the World =

- Film poster
- Directed by: Sutton Roley
- Written by: Norman Hudis
- Produced by: Anthony Spinner
- Starring: Robert Vaughn; David McCallum; Barry Sullivan; Eleanor Parker; Leslie Nielsen; Dan O'Herlihy; Leo G. Carroll
- Cinematography: Robert B. Hauser
- Edited by: Joseph Dervin; Harry Knapp
- Music by: Richard Shores
- Distributed by: Metro-Goldwyn-Mayer
- Release date: March 7, 1969
- Running time: 89 minutes
- Country: United States
- Language: English

How to Steal the World is a 1968 American action–adventure film, taken from a two-part episode of the TV series The Man from U.N.C.L.E., with Robert Vaughn and David McCallum as secret agents Napoleon Solo and Illya Kuryakin. The film also stars Barry Sullivan, Eleanor Parker, Leslie Nielsen, Tony Bill, Peter Mark Richman, Albert Paulsen, Inger Stratton, Hugh Marlowe and Dan O'Herlihy. It was originally telecast as the final episode of the series, "The Seven Wonders of the World Affair". The feature version is the only U.N.C.L.E. film not to include Jerry Goldsmith's theme music. The film was directed by Sutton Roley and written by Norman Hudis.

== Plot ==
U.N.C.L.E. agents Napoleon Solo and Illya Kuryakin investigate when fellow agent Robert Kingsley and European general Maximilian Harmon disappear. Shortly afterward, five of the world's top scientists are mysteriously abducted. The trail leads to the Himalayas, where Kingsley has set himself up as a potential world dictator, hoping to use the combined talents of the scientists to build a device that will spread mind-controlling gas throughout the planet. However, his wife Margitta Kingsley has different plans for the gas.

== Cast ==
- Robert Vaughn as Napoleon Solo
- David McCallum as Illya Kuryakin
- Barry Sullivan as Robert Kingsley
- Eleanor Parker as Margitta Kingsley
- Leslie Nielsen as General Maximilian Harmon
- Leo G. Carroll as Alexander Waverly
- Tony Bill as Steven Garrow
- Peter Mark Richman as Mr. Webb
- Albert Paulsen as Dr. Kurt Erikson
- Inger Stratton as Anna Erikson
- Hugh Marlowe as Grant
- Dan O'Herlihy as Prof. David Garrow

== Release ==
"The Seven Wonders of the World Affair" was originally telecast as the final two episodes of the TV series, The Man from U.N.C.L.E., which aired on NBC on January 8, 1968 and January 15, 1968. The film was released on DVD on November 2, 2011 by Warner Archive Collection.
