= The Spy in the Green Hat =

- Theatrical release poster
- Directed by: Joseph Sargent
- Screenplay by: Peter Allan Fields
- Story by: David Victor
- Starring: Robert Vaughn; David McCallum; Jack Palance; Leo G. Carroll; Ludwig Donath; Joan Blondell; Letícia Román; Will Kuluva; Eduardo Ciannelli; Allen Jenkins; Janet Leigh
- Cinematography: Fred Koenekamp
- Edited by: Joseph Dervin; Ray Williford
- Music by: Nelson Riddle
- Production company: Metro-Goldwyn-Mayer
- Distributed by: Metro-Goldwyn-Mayer
- Release date: February 3, 1967
- Running time: 92 minutes
- Country: United States
- Language: English

The Spy in the Green Hat is a 1967 feature-length film version of The Man from U.N.C.L.E.'s third season two-part episode "The Concrete Overcoat Affair". The episodes were originally broadcast in the United States on November 25, 1966 and December 2, 1966 on NBC. The film was directed by Joseph Sargent and written by Peter Allan Fields with the story by David Victor. Robert Vaughn and David McCallum star in the film as they did in the television series, supported by co-stars Jack Palance and Janet Leigh. It is the fifth such feature film composed of a reedited version of one or more episodes from the series.

== Plot ==
In the mid-1960s height of the Cold War, U.N.C.L.E. agents Napoleon Solo and Illya Kuryakin are assigned to meet and bring the "most wanted" former Nazi, missile expert Dr. Heinrich von Kronen, in to the agency. He is kidnapped by operatives of THRUSH pinwheel Louis Strago, a Sicilian vinter and importer to the U.S. Solo and Kuryakin are assigned to bring him back, which leads them to infiltrate Strago's secret heavy water base disguised in a winery. The THRUSH plan is for Strago to detonate atomic bombs in the Caribbean to divert the Gulf Stream, warm Greenland to serve as a Fatherland for THRUSH, and wreak havoc in Europe and the United States.

The agents are split up after an encounter with Strago's security force, with Solo having to hide that night in the bedroom of curvaceous young Pia Monteri. When Pia's grandmother learns of the disgrace, she initiates a literal shotgun wedding despite Solo's insistence that nothing inappropriate happened. He narrowly escapes with Kuryakin's help and returns to the U.S., but Grandma Monteri enlists the aid of Pia's uncles, the Stilleto brothers, former dons in the Prohibition era Chicago Mafia, to find him.

Kuryakin is soon captured at Strago's import operation in Chicago, and tortured by Strago's top personal assistant, Miss Diketon, a deadly assassin who truly loves her work. The Stilletos are quick to find Solo, who narrowly escapes a second wedding when he and Pia are kidnapped by Strago and his men.

Solo manages to escape, and learns from his superior Alexander Waverly that Pia has been taken to Strago's island base, which U.N.C.L.E. plans to bomb into cinders. In a confrontation with Waverly, Solo insists on going there to rescue her, arguing that Kuryakin, like he, volunteered for his work whereas she is an innocent pawn facing certain death. Denied permission, he resigns. Calling himself a "sentimental old grandmother" Waverly relents.

Diketon is ordered to bring Kuryakin to the missile base. Narrowly surviving a boat explosion caused by Strago's defensive wave device, Solo is captured by the Stiletto entourage, who arrive on scene in a fishing boat. The group guns down the crew of a patrol boat and takes its captain hostage, who flips and provides key information on both security and the workings of the plant and planned imminent missile launch.

Strago's immediate superior in THRUSH, Mr. Thaler, arrives. Strago, a prig who is sexually disgusted by the slinky, kinky Diketon, lusts for the innocent Pia. Turned on by her desperate resistance, he is caught trying to seduce her by the vindictive Diketon. He leaves Diketon to guard Pia while he responds to a security alert. In a knife-wielding catfight Pia overpowers Diketon, but is blocked from leaving by Strago, who slaps Diketon unconscious for her failure. Rejection roils into revenge, and when she recovers with Pia's ministrations, Diketon allies with her and frees Kuryakin. Observed by von Kronen, Kuryakin and Diketon get caught in a gun battle and von Kronen is killed.

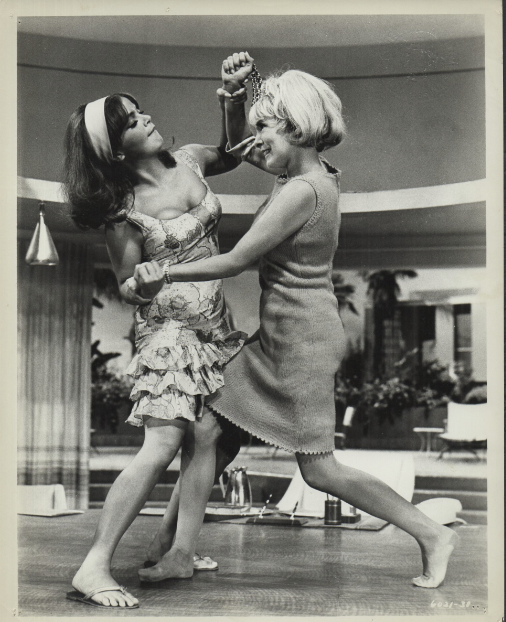
Leticia Roman and Janet Leigh tangle in a catfight

Racing against both the missile launch and the U.N.C.L.E. air strike intended to preempt it, Solo and the Stilettos sweep the island of Strago's security en route to the missile compound. Kuryakin and Diketon encounter them and combine forces. Kuryakin infiltrates the inner workings of the compound in a security force uniform. Seeking to scuttle the missile assault, he is conveniently solicited by Thaler to explain the launch process. Posing as having the authority, he begins to scramble controls, and intentionally floods the launch level - drowning Thaler in the process.

Solo and Diketon encounter Strago, who exchanges deadly fire with Diketon. While battling Solo, Strago is ensnared in the launch mechanism's electrical arc and killed. Diketon expires satisfied that she got to see Strago fail, and die. The launch is averted, and air strike called off. Back on the mainland, everyone is gratified, and all conflicts forgiven. Solo, Kuryakin, and Waverly are guests of the Stilettos at an Italian banquet, with a pacified Grandma Monteri serving the pasta. The survival of the Free World is assured, and the shotgun wedding and its vendetta are called off.

== Cast ==
- Robert Vaughn as Napoleon Solo
- David McCallum as Illya Kuryakin
- Leo G. Carroll as Alexander Waverly
- Letícia Román as Pia Monteri
- Jack Palance as Louis Strago
- Janet Leigh as Miss Diketon
- Eduardo Ciannelli as Arturo "Fingers" Stilletto
- Allen Jenkins as Enzo "Pretty" Stilletto
- Jack La Rue as Federico "Feet" Stilletto
- Joan Blondell as Mrs. "Fingers" Stilletto
- Ludwig Donath as Dr. Heinrich von Kronen
- Will Kuluva as Mr. Thaler
- Penny Santon as Grandma Monteri
- Frank Puglia as Padre
- Vincent Beck as Benjamin Luger
- Maxie Rosenbloom as 'Crunch' Battaglia

== Production ==
The announcement of "The Concrete Overcoat Affair" as a two-part television episode of The Man from U.N.C.L.E. featuring an expensive all-star cast led many critics to correctly believe that it would eventually be re-packaged into a feature film. "Officials won't confirm that it is intended for theater use, but that is indicated by the cast: Janet Leigh, Jack Palance, Joan Blondell. Letitia Roman, plus a quartet of veteran mobsters, Eduardo Cianelli, Jack La Rue, Allen Jenkins, and Maxie Rosenbloom.”

Unlike the four earlier feature Man from U.N.C.L.E. movies, The Spy in the Green Hat made only minimal changes to the episodes. The musical cues were essentially the same, and no major scenes were added or removed. Some short scenes that were more violent, sexy, and disturbing than generally shown on American network television at the time were inserted. Pia Monteri (Román)'s nude back (from the waist up) is briefly shown in the film, but edited out in the TV broadcast. Miss Diketon has lines in the film, enthusiastically delivered by Janet Leigh to make clear she receives sensual pleasure from inflicting pain, also did not appear on television.

The series theme played under the main titles was a faster tempo reworking by Nelson Riddle of Gerald Fried's third season arrangement featuring trumpets, organ and saxophone solo. The titular Spy in the Green Hat is Mr. Thaler of THRUSH, played by Will Kuluva. Kuluva had previously played the head of U.N.C.L.E. Mr. Allison in the unaired pilot for the series. His character was replaced by Leo G. Carroll as Alexander Waverly.

In one scene, Arturo "Fingers" Stiletto (Eduardo Ciannelli) smashes a grapefruit half into the face of his wife, played by Joan Blondell. Blondell then breaks the fourth wall by turning and staring straight into the camera with a look of exasperation at having to endure the homage to an iconic scene between James Cagney and Mae Clark from 1931's The Public Enemy, in which Blondell also had a starring role. Later in the film, Miss Diketon comes to the rescue of Illya Kuryakin (David McCallum) by stabbing one of the THRUSH thugs in the back with a large dagger, perhaps a tongue-in-cheek nod to her notorious role as stabbing victim Marion Crane in Psycho just a few years earlier.

== Release ==
The Spy in the Green Hat is the 1966 feature-length film version of The Man from U.N.C.L.E.'s third season two-part episode "The Concrete Overcoat Affair". The episodes were originally broadcast in the United States on November 25, 1966, and December 2, 1966, on NBC. The film was released on DVD in a collection package by Warner Archive Collection on November 2, 2011.

Newspaper advertisements for the two part television version featured a studio still of Pia and Diketon engaged in a table-top catfight with tag lines such as, "CAT FIGHT - Guest stars Janet Leigh and Letitia Roman mix it up in a cat-like knife fight on NBC-TV's The Man From U.N.C.L.E.."

== Reception ==
While the TV series frequently leveraged sarcastic humor and whimsical comments, The Spy in the Green Hat featured a more madcap level of comedy than previous endeavors. The use of 1930s, Chicago-era, fedota-wearing Italian mobsters all but falling over themselves trying to rescue Pia is an example of some comedic elements present in the film. Napoleon Solo (Robert Vaughn)'s narrowly averted Sicilian shotgun wedding is another.

In the decades since the film’s release, actors Jack Palance and Janet Leigh playing against type caught the attention of critics. While Palance often starred as heavies, his nervous, sweaty take on the priggish, hypochondriacal Louis Strago was clearly at odds with his swaggering, vicious villains. Leigh, often cast as glamorous and demure, instead assays a campy sado-masochistic assassin with a stiletto holstered beneath her dress.

== See also ==
- List of American films of 1967
