= Alexander Waverly =

- The Man from U.N.C.L.E. character
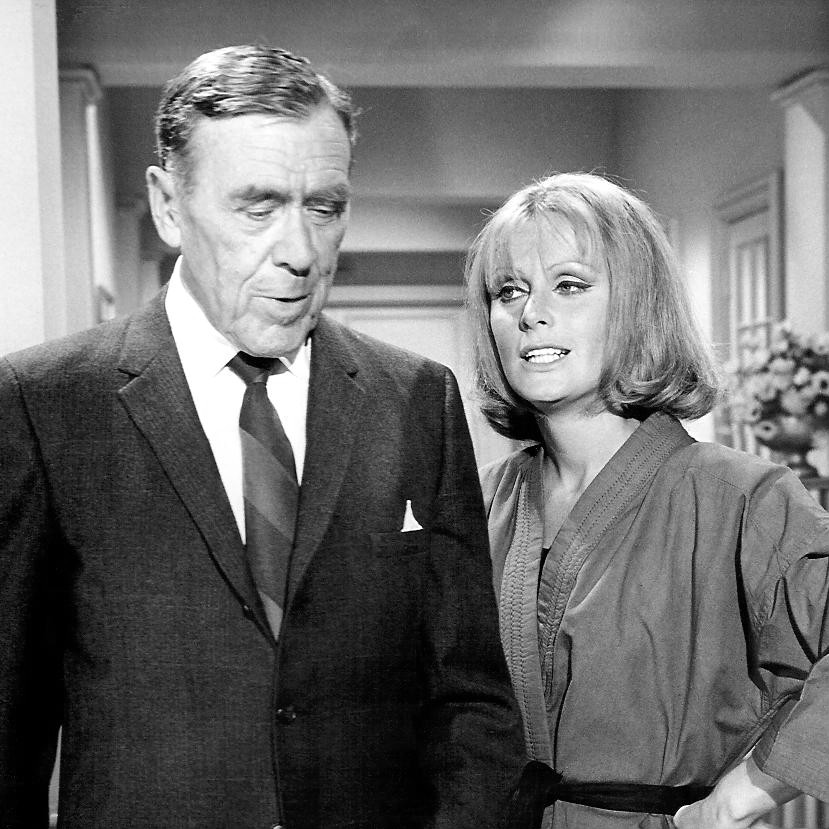
- Leo G. Carroll as Alexander Waverly on The Man from U.N.C.L.E., with guest star Diana Hyland.
- Portrayed by: Leo G. Carroll (television); Hugh Grant (film)

In-universe information
- Gender: Male
- Occupation: Secret Agent
- Family: Melvin (grandson)
- Spouse: Mrs Waverly
- Relatives: Maude Waverly (niece); Lester Baldwin (cousin); Professor Hemingway (brother-in-law)
- Nationality: English

Alexander Waverly is a fictional character from the 1960s television show The Man from U.N.C.L.E., its spin-off series The Girl from U.N.C.L.E. and the 2015 film version.

The original series was remarkable for pairing American agent Napoleon Solo and Russian agent Illya Kuryakin for an international espionage organization at the height of the Cold War. Mr. Waverly is the head of the U.N.C.L.E. organization and was played by the English actor Leo G. Carroll on television and Hugh Grant in the theatrical films.

== Background ==
The pilot for the show featured a "Mr. Allison" as the head of U.N.C.L.E., a character described as a pedantic man in his 50s. Will Kuluva was originally cast in the role. He was replaced by Carroll after the pilot episode when an NBC executive reportedly suggested that the person with the name beginning with "K" be omitted. It later emerged that he had meant the Russian spy, Illya Kuryakin, played by David McCallum. Although Kuluva’s scenes in the pilot episode "The Vulcan Affair" were re-shot with Carroll, Kuluva’s scenes were retained in To Trap a Spy, a feature-length production based on the pilot that was released to cinemas in 1964.

In casting Carroll, the program makers departed from the original concept because the actor was in his 70s at the time. Carroll had been featured in several of Alfred Hitchcock's films and Hitchcock's work was a touchstone for the show's creators. Indeed, Carroll had played "the Professor", the head of the espionage agency in North by Northwest (1959), the film that inspired Norman Felton to bring the spy genre to the small screen.

== Character ==
Solo, Kuryakin, and Waverly were the only regular characters on the program. Waverly is one of five regional heads in charge of the multi-national organization, though his position appears to be that of primus inter pares ("first among equals"). In one episode he presides over an annual meeting of the regional heads ("The Summit Five Affair").

In contrast to the ambiguity of the backgrounds of Solo and Kuryakin, Waverly's family situation is fleshed out over the course of the series. He mentions a grandson called Melvin in "The Bat Cave Affair". His cousin, Lester Baldwin (also played by Carroll), appears in "The Bow Wow Affair". His brother-in-law is Professor Hemingway of Y.I.T., who sometimes consults with the organization ("The Mad, MAD Tea Party Affair"). "The Cap and Gown Affair" reveals that Waverly is an alumnus of Blair University. His niece, Maude Waverly, played by Yvonne Craig, appears in the U.N.C.L.E. film One Spy Too Many, although she does not feature in "The Alexander the Greater Affair" the two-part television episode on which the film is based.

Mr. Waverly was also a regular in the short-lived spin-off series, The Girl from U.N.C.L.E., making Carroll one of the first actors to play the same role in two television shows.

== Personality ==
Waverly is the stereotypical Englishman, formal, reserved, dressing in tweeds and smoking a large pipe. He addresses everyone by their courtesy titles and surnames. He is the head of Section One in U.N.C.L.E. headquarters in New York. He appears to have been something of a ladies man in his youth ("The Bow Wow Affair").

In the first two seasons Waverly is depicted as an unsentimental, tough, pragmatic leader. By the third season, however, he is presented as a more humane, although still pragmatic character. In the third season two-part episode "The Concrete Overcoat Affair", Solo objects to the fact that his partner Kuryakin has been sent on a suicide mission. Although he chastises the agent for questioning his authority, Waverly allows him to go to Kuryakin's aid. As Solo leaves, Waverly can be heard muttering, "Alexander Waverly, sentimental grandmother of the year."

Although primarily working inside headquarters, on rare occasions Waverly joins missions in the field. He goes undercover in "The Pieces of Fate Affair" and during the show's fourth season, he is captured along with three of his agents. He masterminds their escape with the aid of a blade hidden in a flower in his buttonhole ("The Deep Six Affair").

== Afterlife ==
In 1968, Carroll made his final appearance in the role one week after the show's cancellation when he appeared on Rowan & Martin's Laugh-In, the series that replaced U.N.C.L.E. His final lines on screen are "Mr. Kuryakin, come quick. I think I've found THRUSH headquarters at last." Carroll died in 1972 and his character did not appear in the 1983 reunion movie Return of the Man from U.N.C.L.E.:The Fifteen Years Later Affair where it is implied that Mr. Waverly had died relatively recently.

== Film ==
Hugh Grant portrayed Waverly in The Man from U.N.C.L.E., a feature film prequel to the TV series.
