= Return of the Man from U.N.C.L.E. =

1983 television film directed by Ray Austin

- DVD cover
- Also known as: The Return of the Man from U.N.C.L.E.: The Fifteen Years Later Affair
- Genre: Action; Adventure; Crime; Thriller
- Written by: Michael Sloan
- Directed by: Ray Austin
- Starring: Robert Vaughn; David McCallum
- Music by: Gerald Fried
- Country of origin: United States
- Original language: English

Production
- Executive producer: Michael Sloan
- Producer: Nigel Watts
- Cinematography: Fred J. Koenekamp
- Editor: George Jay Nicholson
- Running time: 96 minutes
- Production companies: Michael Sloan Productions; Viacom Productions
- Budget: $2.2 million

Original release
- Network: CBS
- Release: April 5, 1983

The Return of the Man from U.N.C.L.E.: The Fifteen Years Later Affair is a 1983 American made-for-television action-adventure film based on the 1964–1968 television series The Man from U.N.C.L.E. starring Robert Vaughn and David McCallum reprising the roles they had originated on that program. Several of the crew from the series also worked on the film, which was produced by Viacom rather than Metro-Goldwyn-Mayer and/or Turner Entertainment. Leo G. Carroll had died in 1972, so Patrick Macnee was recruited to appear as an entirely different character, Sir John Raleigh, who had presumably taken over as Number 1 of Section I, the Director of U.N.C.L.E., after Alexander Waverly had died, and Carroll's photograph was displayed prominently in many scenes that featured Macnee's Sir John.

== Plot ==
The criminal international organization T.H.R.U.S.H. steals the bomb H957 and demands $350 million, to be delivered within 72 hours by their former adversary, Napoleon Solo. This forces U.N.C.L.E., the United Network Command for Law and Enforcement, to reactivate the two top agents of its Section II, Solo and Illya Kuryakin, both of whom had left its ranks 15 years before and are now pursuing other lines of civilian work—Kuryakin as a fashion designer whose resignation was acrimonious and precipitated by a professional disaster, Solo as a marketer of computers and independent businessman.

Both men decide to return to duty because of unfinished business—Solo with Justin Sepheran and Kuryakin with Janus; an ex-U.N.C.L.E. agent who Ilya suspects of having betrayed him on a past mission. Also complicating things is Andrea Markovich, ostensibly a Russian ballerina wishing to defect—but she has several surprises up her sleeve.

Equipped in their original fashion, Solo and Kuryakin search for the bomb and attempt to close down permanently what proves to be a splinter T.H.R.U.S.H. group; the original organization had fragmented in 1968 after its failure in "The Seven Wonders of the World Affair" and has yet to regain the power to threaten worldwide law and order that it had possessed up to that time.

== Cast ==
- Robert Vaughn as Napoleon Solo
- David McCallum as Illya Kuryakin
- Patrick Macnee as Sir John Raleigh
- Gayle Hunnicutt as Andrea Markovich
- Geoffrey Lewis as Janus
- Anthony Zerbe as Justin Sepheran
- Tom Mason as Benjamin Kowalski
- Keenan Wynn as Piers Castillian
- Simon Williams as Nigel Pennington-Smythe
- George Lazenby as J.B.
- John Harkins as Alexi Kemp
- Susan Woollen as Friday
- Judith Chapman as "Z"
- Lois de Banzie as Mrs. Delquist
- Dick Durock as Guiedo
- Randi Brooks as The Model
- Jack Somack as The Tailor Shop Owner
- Eddie Baker as The Dealer

== Production ==
Producer and writer Michael Sloan, a longtime fan of The Man from U.N.C.L.E., based his script on a treatment he had written at age 19 during the series' original run. MGM, who owned the rights, had been interested in a theatrical version of the series until Sloan introduced the idea of a television film, which resulted in MGM passing the project to their television division. MGM eventually lost interest in the project after a year of negotiations with CBS, but Sloan took the project to Viacom, who purchased temporary rights to the series and made the deal with CBS (wherein all rights would revert to MGM following telecast and theatrical engagements in Europe). Robert Short served as technical advisor on the film and, like Sloan, was also a fan of the original series and even provided a reel of footage from the original series for director Ray Austin to showcase the tone, balance, and structure of the series. Short had also acquired many props from the original series at an MGM auction 10 years prior and incorporated many of them in the movie.

George Lazenby's cameo appearance as J.B. – driving an Aston Martin and complete with an On Her Majesty's Secret Service name check – made 1983 the year of three James Bonds, with the "battle" at the box office between Roger Moore's sixth outing (Octopussy) and Sean Connery's return to the role after 12 years (in Never Say Never Again).

== Release ==
Return of the Man from U.N.C.L.E. was broadcast on April 5, 1983 as part of The CBS Tuesday Movie. The film proved to be a ratings success for CBS with a Nielsen rating of 17.4, an audience share of 28, and ranked in 22nd place of that week's programming.

== Critical response ==
Writing in The New York Times, critic John J. O'Connor reported that the protagonists "manage to get through the familiar array of car chases and other assorted thrills with their old deadpan sophistication intact," and "considering the passage of time, the two men are in remarkably good shape, although it's a touch difficult to believe grown, beautiful women cooing constantly about Illya's blue eyes," concluding that "it's all cleverly concocted fantasy, as taxing as your average comic strip." Critic Paul Mavis wrote in DVD Talk that the "iconic stars returned for this limp, unfocused comeback, but neither should have bothered, considering the end results," and "I was unfortunately reminded of the original series' wit and charm (as well as its wealth of serious/spoofy action) - elements all sadly lacking in this later lackluster affair," but noted that "when [Robert Vaughn and David McCallum] are on the screen together (and there are surprisingly few times that actually happens here - a big problem right there), it's obvious they're enjoying themselves, bouncing lines and knowing expressions off each other in a manner that approximates their previous duet act 15 years prior."

Norman Felton, who had served as a producer on the original series, spoke positively of the film and observed, "Return seemed to be written by an U.N.C.L.E. fan who remembered certain things, and gave them a twist. There was a lot of freshness.". The series co-creator, Sam Rolfe, was more negative in his assessment of the film saying it had no understanding of the underlying concept of the series.
