= The Man from U.N.C.L.E. =

American television spy drama series (1964–1968)

- Series title card
- Genre: Action; Spy fiction
- Created by: Sam Rolfe; Norman Felton
- Developed by: Sam Rolfe
- Starring: Robert Vaughn; David McCallum; Leo G. Carroll
- Theme music composer: Jerry Goldsmith
- Country of origin: United States
- No. of seasons: 4
- No. of episodes: 105 (list of episodes)

Production
- Executive producer: Norman Felton
- Camera setup: Single-camera
- Running time: 50 minutes
- Production companies: Arena Productions; Metro-Goldwyn-Mayer Television

Original release
- Network: NBC
- Release: September 22, 1964 – January 15, 1968

Related
- The Girl from U.N.C.L.E. (1966–1967)

The Man from U.N.C.L.E. is an American spy fiction television series produced by Metro-Goldwyn-Mayer Television and first broadcast on NBC. The series follows secret agents Napoleon Solo, played by Robert Vaughn, and Illya Kuryakin, played by David McCallum, who work for a secret international counterespionage and law-enforcement agency called U.N.C.L.E. (United Network Command for Law and Enforcement). The series premiered on September 22, 1964, and completed its run on January 15, 1968. The program was part of the spy-fiction craze on television and, by 1966 there were nearly a dozen imitators. Several episodes were successfully released to theaters as B movies or double features. There was also a spin-off series, The Girl from U.N.C.L.E., a series of novels and comic books, and merchandising.

With few recurring characters, the series attracted many high-profile guest stars. Props from the series are exhibited at the Ronald Reagan Presidential Library and Museum and at the museums of the Central Intelligence Agency and other US intelligence agencies. The series won the Golden Globe Award for Best TV Show in 1966.

Originally, co-creator Sam Rolfe (of Have Gun – Will Travel fame) wanted to leave the meaning of U.N.C.L.E. ambiguous so it could refer to either "Uncle Sam" or the United Nations. Concerns by the MGM legal department about using "U.N." for commercial purposes caused U.N.C.L.E. to become an acronym for the United Network Command for Law and Enforcement. Each episode had a spurious "We wish to thank" acknowledgement to U.N.C.L.E. in the end titles.

== Background ==
The series consists of 105 episodes originally broadcast between 1964 and 1968, produced by Metro-Goldwyn-Mayer and Arena productions. The first season was produced in black-and-white, the remaining seasons in color.

The first episode was broadcast on September 22, 1964, as part of the Tuesday night NBC lineup, but moved to Monday nights, a half hour earlier, the following January.

Ian Fleming contributed to the series after being approached by co-creator Norman Felton. According to the book The James Bond Films, Fleming proposed two characters, Napoleon Solo and April Dancer (later appearing on the spin-off series The Girl from U.N.C.L.E.). The original name for the show was Ian Fleming's Solo. Robert Towne, Sherman Yellen, and Harlan Ellison later wrote scripts for the series. Author Michael Avallone, who wrote the first original novelization based upon the series (see below), is sometimes incorrectly cited as the show's creator.

Originally, Solo was the focus of the series, but David McCallum as Russian agent Illya Kuryakin drew so much enthusiasm from fans that the agents became a team.

== Premise ==
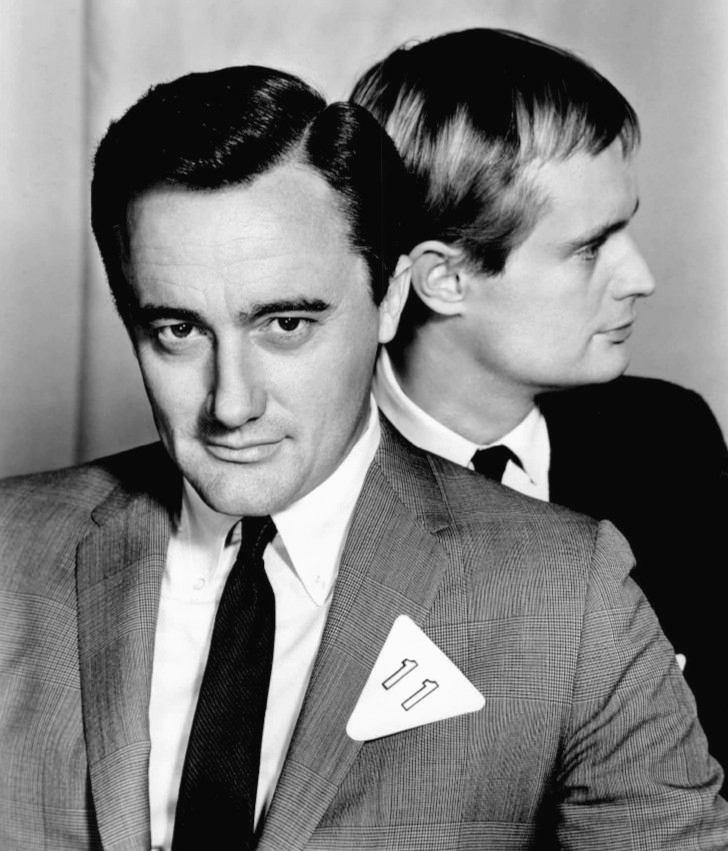
Solo and Kuryakin

The series centered on a two-man troubleshooting team working for multi-national secret intelligence agency U.N.C.L.E. (United Network Command for Law and Enforcement): American Napoleon Solo (Robert Vaughn), and Russian Illya Kuryakin (David McCallum). Leo G. Carroll played Alexander Waverly, the British chief of the organization. Barbara Moore joined the cast as Lisa Rogers in the final season.

The series, though fictional, achieved such cultural prominence that props, costumes, documents, and a video clip are in the Ronald Reagan Presidential Library and Museum's exhibit on spies and counterspies. Similar exhibits are held by the museum of the Central Intelligence Agency.

=== Thrush ===
U.N.C.L.E.'s primary adversary was Thrush (called WASP in the first film, To Trap a Spy). The original series never divulged whom or what Thrush represented, nor was it ever used as an acronym. The novels written by David McDaniel say that it stands for "Technological Hierarchy for the Removal of Undesirables and the Subjugation of Humanity", described as having been founded by Colonel Sebastian Moran after the death of Professor Moriarty at the Reichenbach Falls in the Sherlock Holmes short story "The Final Problem". But in a second season episode, guest star Jessie Royce Landis plays a character who claims that she founded Thrush. Producer Felton always insisted that Thrush was not an acronym and stood for nothing, and "Technological Hierarchy for the Removal of Undesirables and the Subjugation of Humanity" was never used by any other of the novelists.

Thrush's aim was to conquer the world. Thrush was considered so dangerous an organization that even governments who were ideologically opposed to each other—such as the United States and the Soviet Union—had cooperated in forming and operating the U.N.C.L.E. organization. Similarly, whilst Solo and Kuryakin held opposing political views, the friction between them in the story was held to a minimum. Although executive producer Norman Felton and Ian Fleming conceived Napoleon Solo, it was the producer Sam Rolfe who created the global U.N.C.L.E. hierarchy, and he who included the Soviet agent, Illya Kuryakin. Unlike the American CIA, the British MI5, or the Soviet KGB, U.N.C.L.E. was cosmopolitan, a global organization of agents from many countries and cultures.

=== Innocent character ===
The creators decided an innocent character would be featured in each episode, giving the audience someone with whom to identify. Despite many changes over four seasons, "innocents" remained a constant – from a suburban housewife in the pilot, "The Vulcan Affair" (film version: To Trap a Spy), to those kidnapped in the final episode, "The Seven Wonders of the World Affair".

== Episodes ==
=== Solo – the pilot ===
Filmed in color from late November to early December 1963, with locations at a Lever Brothers soap factory in California, the television pilot made as a 70-minute film was originally titled Ian Fleming's Solo and later shortened to Solo. However, in February 1964 a law firm representing James Bond producers Harry Saltzman and Albert R. Broccoli demanded an end to the use of Fleming's name in connection with the series and an end to the use of the name and character "Solo", "Napoleon Solo" and "Mr. Solo". At that time filming was underway for the Bond film Goldfinger, in which Martin Benson was playing a supporting character named "Mr. Solo", an American Mafia boss murdered by Auric Goldfinger. The claim was the name "Solo" had been sold to them by Fleming, and Fleming could not use it again. Within five days Fleming had signed an affidavit that nothing in the Solo pilot infringed any of his Bond characters, but the threat of legal action resulted in a settlement in which the name Napoleon Solo could be kept but the title of the show had to change. Coincidentally, the TV series debuted only a few days after the Sept. 17, 1964 U.K. release of the Goldfinger movie with its "Mr. Solo" character, though U.S. release would not occur until 1965.

The role of the head of U.N.C.L.E. in the pilot was Mr. Allison, played by Will Kuluva, rather than Mr. Waverly, played by Leo G. Carroll, and David McCallum's Illya Kuryakin only had a brief role. Revisions to some scenes were shot for television, including those needed to feature Leo G. Carroll. The pilot episode was reedited to 50 minutes to fit a one-hour time slot, converted to black-and-white, and shown on television as "The Vulcan Affair".

Additional color sequences with Luciana Paluzzi were shot in April 1964, and then added to the pilot for MGM to release it outside the United States as a B movie titled To Trap a Spy. This premiered in Hong Kong in November 1964. The extra scenes were reedited to tone down their sexuality, and then used in the regular series in the episode "The Four-Steps Affair".

Beyond extra scenes for the feature film, and revised scene shots and edits made for the television episode, there are other differences among the three versions of the story. Before the show went into full production there was concern from Metro-Goldwyn-Mayer that the name of Thrush for the pilot's international criminal organization sounded too much like SMERSH, the international spy-killing organization in Fleming's Bond series. The studio suggested Raven, Shark, Squid, Vulture, Tarantula, Snipe, Sphinx, Dooom [sic], and Maggot (the last used in early scripts). Although no legal action took place, the name "WASP" was used in the feature version To Trap a Spy. The original pilot kept "Thrush" (presumably since it was not intended to be released to the public in that version). Felton and Rolfe pushed for the reinstatement of "Thrush". It turned out that WASP could not be used, since Gerry Anderson's British television series Stingray was based on an organization called W.A.S.P. (World Aquanaut Security Patrol). By May 1964, Thrush was retained for the television episode edit of the pilot. Despite this, WASP was used by the feature film in Japan in late 1964, and it was left in the American release in 1966.

Another change among the three versions of the pilot story was the cover name for the character of Elaine May Donaldson. In the original pilot it was Elaine Van Nessen; in the television version and the feature version it was Elaine Van Every. Illya Kuryakin's badge number is 17 in the pilot, rather than 2 during the series, and Solo's hair, after new footage was added, changed back and forth from a slicked back style to the less severe style he wore throughout the series.

With the popularity of the show and the spy craze, To Trap a Spy and the second U.N.C.L.E. feature The Spy with My Face were released in the United States as an MGM double feature in early 1966.

=== Season 1 ===
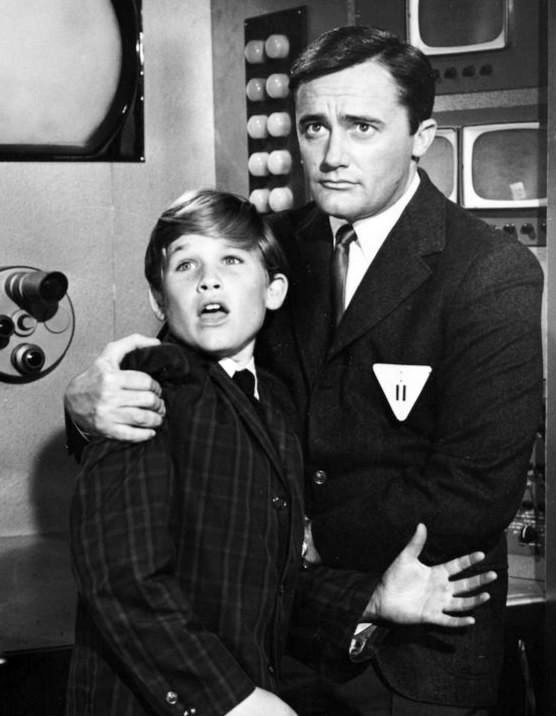
Vaughn and Kurt Russell in "The Finny Foot Affair"

The show's first season was in black-and-white. Rolfe created a kind of Alice's Adventures in Wonderland world, where mundane everyday life would intersect with the looking-glass fantasy of international espionage which lay just beyond. The U.N.C.L.E. universe was one where the weekly "innocent" would get caught up in a series of fantastic adventures, in a battle of good and evil.

U.N.C.L.E. headquarters in New York City was most-frequently entered by a secret passage in Del Floria's Tailor Shop. Another entrance was through The Masque Club. Mr. Waverly had his own secret entrance, hinted at in the episode "The Mad, Mad Tea Party Affair". The episodes were largely filmed on the MGM back lot. The same building with an imposing exterior staircase was used for episodes set throughout the Mediterranean area and Latin America, and the same dirt road lined with eucalyptus trees on the back lot in Culver City stood in for virtually every continent of the globe.

The episodes followed a naming convention where each title was in the form of "The ***** Affair", such as "The Vulcan Affair", "The Mad, Mad, Tea Party Affair", and "The Waverly Ring Affair", etc. The only exception was "Alexander the Greater Affair". The first season episode "The Green Opal Affair" establishes that U.N.C.L.E. uses the term "affair" to refer to its different missions. Every episode was divided into four "Acts", numbered with Roman numerals, each of which had a title that referred to something that happened or was said within the act.

Rolfe endeavored to make the implausible elements in the series seem not only feasible but entertaining. In the series, frogmen emerge from wells in Iowa, shootouts occur between U.N.C.L.E. and Thrush agents in a crowded Manhattan theater, and top-secret organizations are hidden behind innocuous brownstone facades. The series began to dabble in spy-fi, beginning with "The Double Affair" in which a Thrush agent, made to look like Solo through plastic surgery, infiltrates a secret U.N.C.L.E. facility where an immensely powerful weapon called "Project Earthsave" is stored; according to the dialogue, the weapon was developed to protect against a potential alien threat to Earth. The Spy with My Face was the theatrical film version of this episode.

In its first season The Man from U.N.C.L.E. competed against The Red Skelton Show on CBS and Walter Brennan's short-lived The Tycoon on ABC. Initially, ratings were poor and The Man from U.N.C.L.E. faced cancellation. But NBC changed time slots to Monday nights, where the show found a receptive audience. The success of the James Bond film Goldfinger also created a huge interest in spy stories, which was a benefit to the series. During this time, producer Norman Felton told Alan Caillou and several of the series writers to make the show's tone more tongue-in-cheek.

=== Seasons 2–4 ===
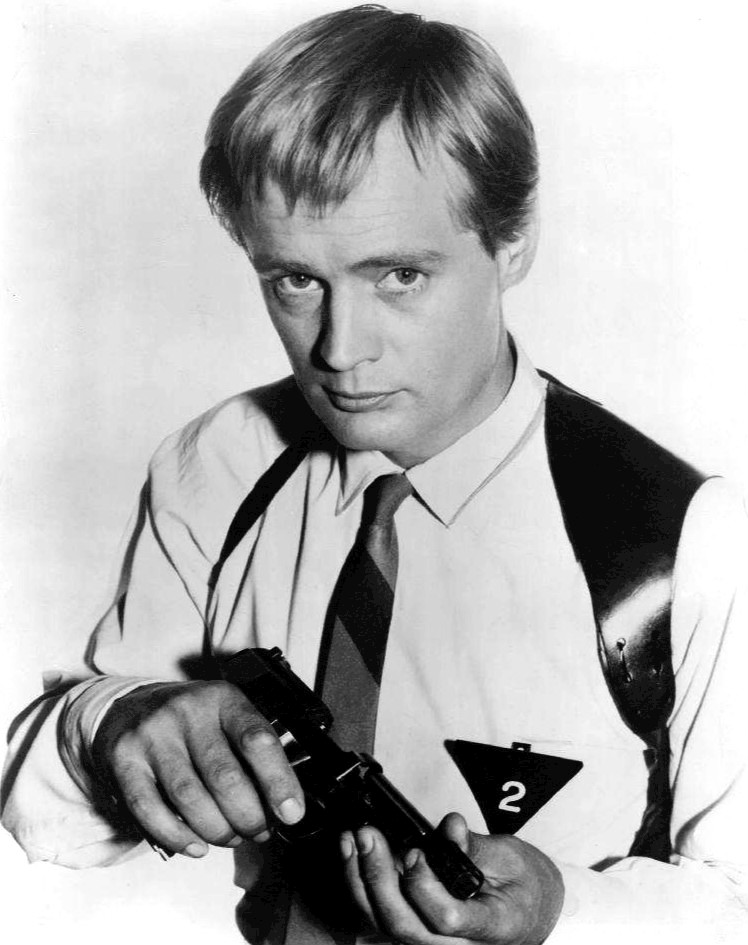
David McCallum as Illya Kuryakin

Switching to color, U.N.C.L.E. continued to enjoy huge popularity. When Rolfe left the show at the conclusion of the first season, David Victor became the new showrunner. Over the next three seasons, five different showrunners would supervise the U.N.C.L.E. franchise, and each one took the show in a direction that differed considerably from that of the first season. In an attempt to emulate the success of ABC's mid-season hit Batman, which had proved hugely popular with its debut in early 1966, U.N.C.L.E. moved swiftly towards self-parody and slapstick. In contrast to other seasons, the fourth and final season had a recurring female character, Lisa Rogers, played by Barbara Moore in ten episodes.

During the third season the producers made a conscious decision to increase the level of humor. This new direction resulted in a severe Nielsen ratings drop, and again nearly resulted in the show's cancellation. It was renewed for a fourth season and an attempt was made to go back to more serious storytelling, but the ratings never recovered and U.N.C.L.E. was finally cancelled midway through the season.

== Spin-off series ==
The series was popular enough to generate a spin-off series, The Girl from U.N.C.L.E. (1966–67) The "girl" was first introduced during The Man from U.N.C.L.E. episode "The Moonglow Affair" (February 25, 1966) and was then played by Mary Ann Mobley. The spin-off series ran for one season, starring Stefanie Powers as agent "April Dancer", a character name credited to Ian Fleming; and Noel Harrison as agent Mark Slate (who had been played substantially differently by actor Norman Fell in the pilot). There was some crossover between the two shows, and Leo G. Carroll played Mr. Waverly in both programs, becoming the second actor in American television to star as the same character in two separate series.

== Reunion TV movie ==
A reunion telefilm, Return of the Man from U.N.C.L.E. subtitled The Fifteen Years Later Affair, was broadcast on CBS in America on April 5, 1983, with Vaughn and McCallum reprising their roles, and Patrick Macnee replacing Leo G. Carroll, who had died in 1972, as the head of U.N.C.L.E. A framed picture of Carroll appeared on his desk. The film included a tribute to Ian Fleming via a cameo appearance by an unidentified secret agent with the initials "JB". The part was played by George Lazenby, driving James Bond's trademark vehicle, an Aston Martin DB5. One character, identifying him, says that it is "just like On Her Majesty's Secret Service", which was Lazenby's only Bond film.

The film, written by Michael Sloan and directed by Ray Austin, briefly filled in the missing years. Thrush had been put out of business, and the escape of its leader from prison begins the story. Solo and Kuryakin, who had retired, are recalled by U.N.C.L.E. to recapture the escapee and defeat Thrush once and for all. Rather than reuniting the agents and recapturing their chemistry, however, the film has the agents separated and paired with younger agents. Like most similar reunion films, this production was considered a trial balloon for a possible new series which never materialized.

Although some personnel from the original series were involved (like composer Gerald Fried and director of photography Fred Koenekamp), the film was not produced by MGM but by Michael Sloan Productions in association with Viacom Productions.

== Theme music ==
The theme music, written by Jerry Goldsmith, changed slightly each season. Goldsmith provided only three original scores and was succeeded by Morton Stevens, who composed four scores for the series. After Stevens, Walter Scharf did six scores, and Lalo Schifrin did two.

Gerald Fried was composer from season two through the beginning of season four, and rearranged the theme twice. The final composers were Robert Drasnin, Nelson Riddle, and lastly Richard Shores. Drasnin also scored episodes of Mission: Impossible, as did Schifrin, Scharf, and Fried. Riddle's score for the two-part episode "The Concrete Overcoat Affair" was so loathed by executive producer Norman Felton that he never hired the composer again, although the music did get tracked into other third-season episodes and the film version.

The music reflected the show's changing seasons. Goldsmith, Stevens, and Scharf composed dramatic scores in the first season using brass, unusual time signatures and martial rhythms. Gerald Fried and Robert Drasnin opted for a lighter approach in the second, employing jazz flute, harpsichords and bongos. By the third season, the music, like the show, had become more camp, exemplified by a faster R&B organ and saxophone riff version of the theme. The fourth season's attempt at seriousness was duly echoed by Richard Shores' somber scores.

== Guest stars and other actors ==
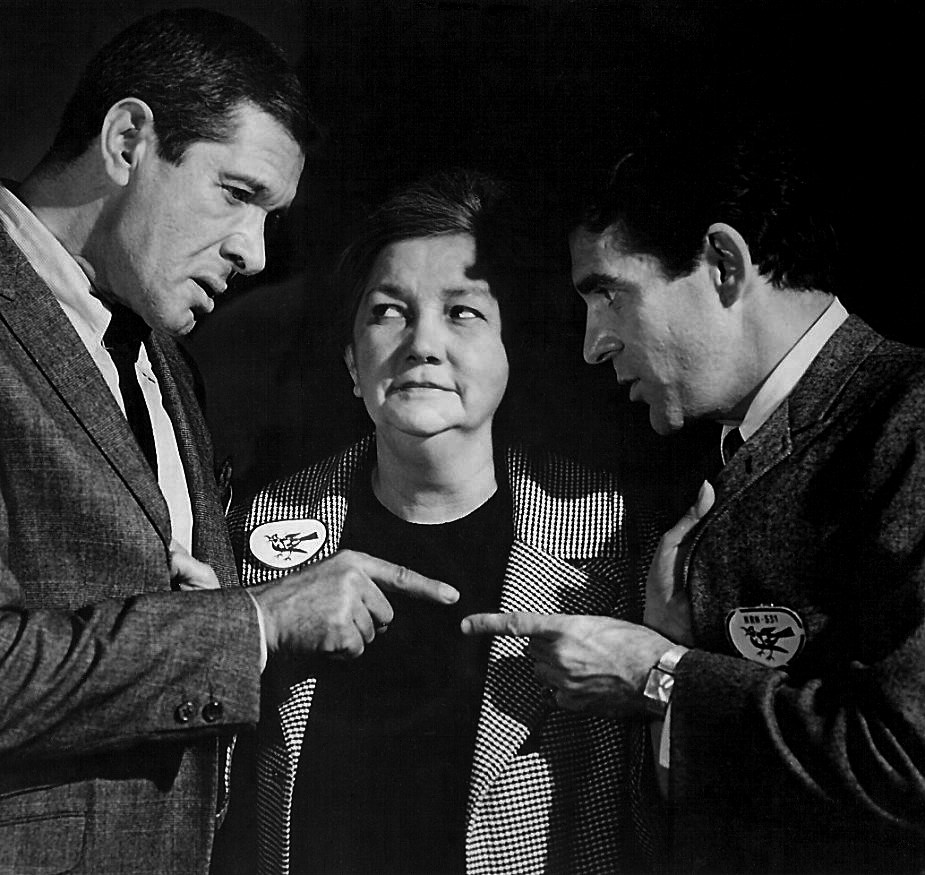
Jan Murray, Patsy Kelly, and Pat Harrington Jr. in "The Hula Doll Affair" (1967)

Apart from Solo, Kuryakin, and Waverly, few recurring characters appeared on the show with any regularity. As a result, The Man from U.N.C.L.E. featured many high-profile guest performers during its three-and-a-half-year run.

William Shatner and Leonard Nimoy appeared together in a 1964 episode, "The Project Strigas Affair", a full two years before Star Trek premiered. Shatner played a heroic civilian recruited for an U.N.C.L.E. mission, and Nimoy played the villain's henchman. The villain was portrayed by Werner Klemperer. James Doohan appeared in two episodes, as different characters.

Barbara Feldon played an U.N.C.L.E. translator eager for field work in "The Never-Never Affair", one year before becoming one of the stars of Get Smart. Robert Culp played the villain in 1964's "The Shark Affair". Leigh Chapman appeared in a recurring role as Napoleon Solo's secretary, Sarah, for several episodes in 1965.

Woodrow Parfrey appeared five times as a guest performer, although he never received an opening-title credit. Usually cast as a scientist, he played the primary villain in one episode, "The Cherry Blossom Affair". Another five-time guest star was Jill Ireland, who at the time was married to the series' star David McCallum. Ricardo Montalbán appeared in two episodes as the primary villain. "The Five Daughters Affair" featured a cameo appearance by Joan Crawford. Janet Leigh and Jack Palance appeared in "The Concrete Overcoat Affair" and Sonny and Cher made a joint appearance in the third season episode "The Hot Number Affair". Other notable guest stars included: Lola Albright, Richard Anderson, Eve Arden, Martin Balsam, Whitney Blake, Joan Blondell, Lloyd Bochner, Judy Carne, Roger C. Carmel, Ted Cassidy, Joan Collins, Walter Coy, Yvonne Craig, Broderick Crawford, Kim Darby, Albert Dekker, Bradford Dillman, Ivan Dixon, Chad Everett, Anne Francis, Harold Gould, Grayson Hall, Pat Harrington Jr., James Hong, Allen Jenkins, Patsy Kelly, Richard Kiel, Marta Kristen, Elsa Lanchester, Martin Landau, Angela Lansbury, Herbert Lom, Julie London, Jack Lord, Lynn Loring, Jan Murray, Leslie Nielsen, William Marshall, Eve McVeagh, Carroll O'Connor, Susan Oliver, David Opatoshu, Leslie Parrish, Eleanor Parker, Slim Pickens, Vincent Price, Dorothy Provine, Cesar Romero, Charles Ruggles, Kurt Russell, Telly Savalas, Barbara Shelley, Nancy Sinatra, Sharon Tate, Terry-Thomas, Rip Torn, Fritz Weaver, and Elen Willard (in her last acting appearance).

== Gadgets ==
=== Communications devices ===
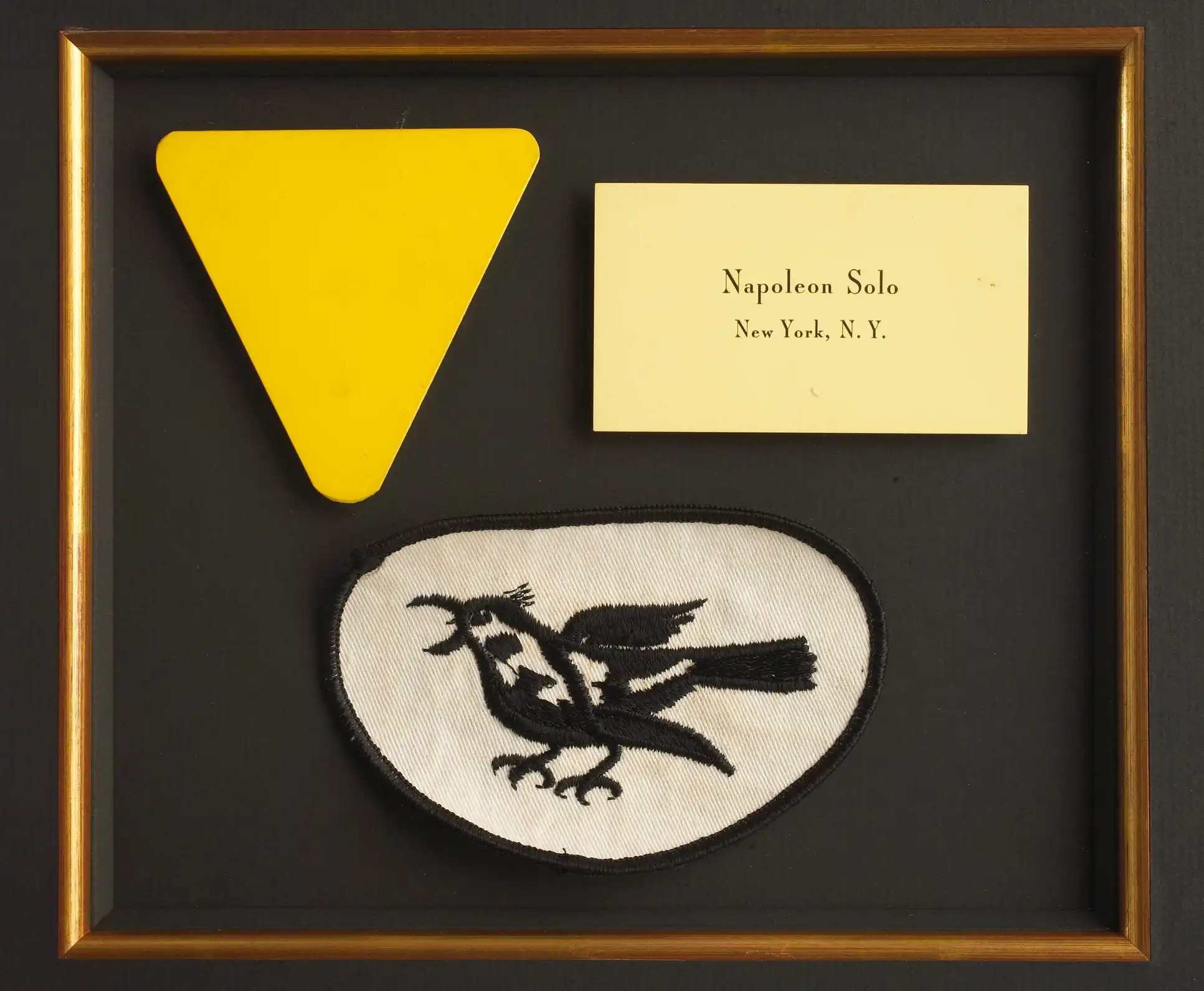
U.N.C.L.E.'s security badge; Napoleon Solo's business card; insignia of the evil Thrush organization, CIA Museum

The characters in the series had a range of useful spy equipment, including handheld satellite communicators. A catchphrase often heard was "Open Channel D" when agents used their pocket radios; these were originally disguised as cigarette packs, later as cigarette cases, and still later as fountain pens. One of the original pen communicator props is now in the museum of the CIA. Replicas have been made over the years for other displays, and this is the second-most-identifiable prop from the series (closely following the U.N.C.L.E. Special pistol).

=== U.N.C.L.E. car ===
A few of the third- and fourth-season episodes featured an "U.N.C.L.E. car", which was a modified Piranha Coupe, a plastic-bodied concept car based on the Chevrolet Corvair chassis built in limited numbers by the custom car designer Gene Winfield. The U.N.C.L.E. car had been lost after the end of the TV series, but it was found in Colorado during the early 1980s, and it was restored to original condition by Oscar-winning special effects artist Robert Short of California.

=== Weaponry ===
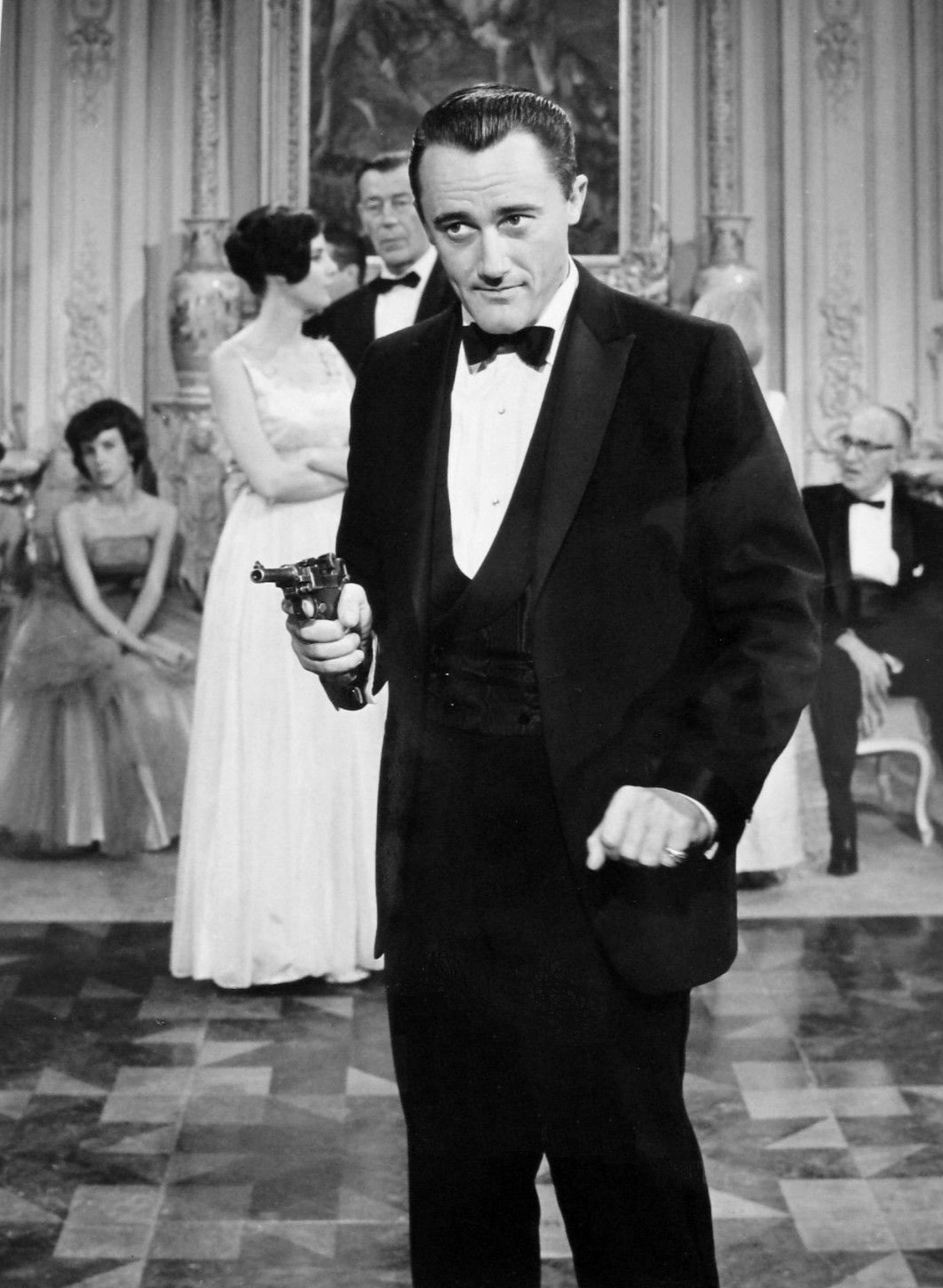
Robert Vaughn with his P-08 "The Vulcan Affair"

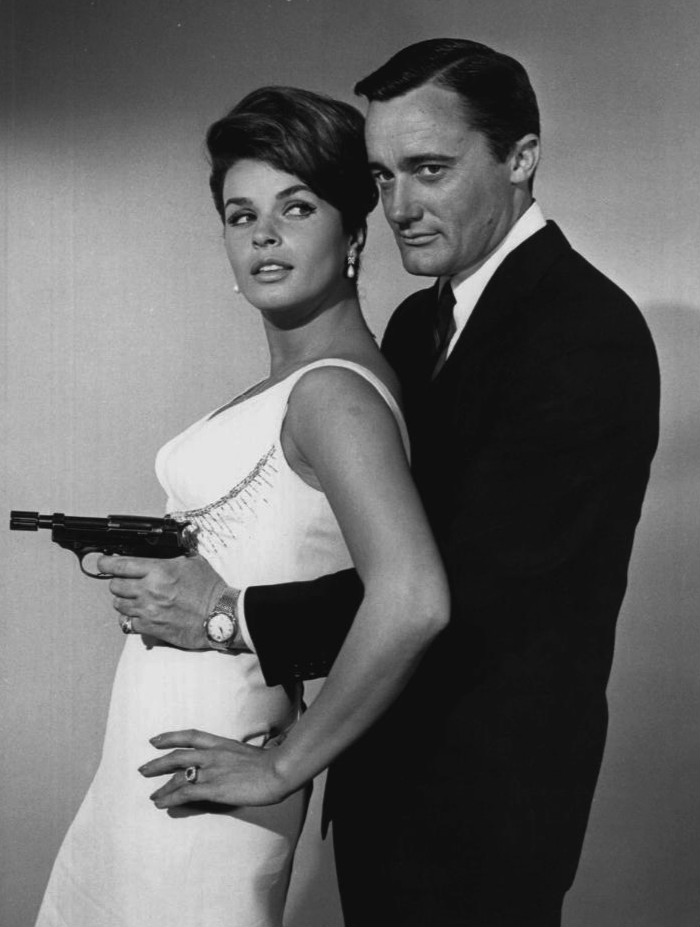
Robert Vaughn with his modified P-38 (1964)

One prop, designed by the toy designer Reuben Klamer often referred to as "The Gun", drew so much attention that it actually spurred considerable fan mail, and was often so addressed. Internally designated the "U.N.C.L.E. Special", it was a modular semi-automatic firearm weapon. The basic pistol could be converted into a longer-range carbine by attaching a long barrel, an extendable shoulder stock, a telescopic sight, and an extended magazine. In this "carbine mode", the pistol could fire on full automatic. This capability brought authorities to the set to investigate reports that the studio was illegally manufacturing machine guns. They threatened to confiscate the prop guns and it took a tour of the prop room to convince them that these were actually "dummy" pistols incapable of firing live ammunition. The actual pistol used as the prop was the Mauser Model 1934 Pocket Pistol, but it was unreliable, it jammed constantly, and it was dwarfed by the carbine accessories. It was soon replaced by the larger and more-reliable Walther P38.

The long magazine was actually a standard magazine with a dummy extension, but it inspired several small-arms manufacturers to begin making long magazines for various pistols. While many of these continue to be available 40 years later, long magazines were not available for the P38 for some years.

Thrush had a range of weaponry of its own, much of them only in the development stage before being destroyed by the heroes. A notable item was the infrared sniperscope, enabling villains to aim gunfire in total darkness. The prop was built from a U.S. Army-surplus M1 carbine, with a vertical foregrip and barrel compensator, and using army-surplus infrared scopes. The infrared special effect was achieved using a searchlight to illuminate the target. The viewfinder image was a negative version of the film. When the scopes were switched on a pulsing chirp sound effect was used. The fully equipped carbines were seen only once, in "The Iowa Scuba Affair". After that, a mockup of the scope was used to make handling easier.

German small arms were well represented in the series. Not only were P38s frequently seen (both as the U.N.C.L.E. Special and in standard configuration), but also the Luger pistol. In the pilot episode "The Vulcan Affair", Illya Kuryakin is carrying a M1911 pistol. The Mauser C96 and MP 40 machine pistols were favored by opponents. U.N.C.L.E. also used the MP 40. Beginning in the third season, both U.N.C.L.E and Thrush agents used rifles that were either the Spanish CETME or the Heckler & Koch G3 (based on the CETME).

== Awards and nominations ==
Emmy Awards

- 1965: Outstanding Individual Achievements in Entertainment – Actors and Performers (nominated) – David McCallum
- 1965: Outstanding Program Achievements in Entertainment (nominated) – Sam Rolfe
- 1966: Outstanding Continued Performance by an Actor in a Leading Role in a Dramatic Series (nominated) – David McCallum
- 1966: Outstanding Dramatic Series (nominated) – Norman Felton
- 1966: Outstanding Performance by an Actor in a Supporting Role in a Drama (nominated) – Leo G. Carroll
- 1966: Individual Achievements in Music – Composition (nominated) – Jerry Goldsmith
- 1966: Outstanding Achievements in Film Editing (nominated) - Henry Berman, Joseph Dervin, William Gulick
- 1967: Outstanding Performance by an Actor in a Supporting Role in a Drama (nominated) – Leo G. Carroll

Golden Globe Awards

- 1965: Best TV Star – Male (nominated) – Robert Vaughn
- 1966: Best TV Star – Male (nominated) – Robert Vaughn
- 1966: Best TV Star – Male (nominated) – David McCallum
- 1966: Best TV Show (won)
- 1967: Best TV Show (nominated)

Grammy Awards

- 1966: Best Original Score Written for a Motion Picture or Television Show (nominated) – Lalo Schifrin, Morton Stevens, Walter Scharf, Jerry Goldsmith

Logie Awards

- 1966: Best Overseas Show (won)

== Feature films ==
=== Theatrical releases of episodes ===
The Man from U.N.C.L.E. rated so highly in America and the UK that MGM and the producers decided to film extra footage (often more adult to evoke Bond films) for two of the first season episodes and release them to theaters after they had aired on TV. The episodes with the extra footage that made it to theaters were the original pilot, "The Vulcan Affair", retitled To Trap a Spy and "The Double Affair" retitled as The Spy with My Face. Both had added sex and violence, new sub-plots and guest stars not in the original TV episodes. They were released in early 1966 as an U.N.C.L.E. double-feature program first run in neighborhood theaters, bypassing the customary downtown movie palaces which were still thriving in the mid-1960s and where new films usually played for weeks or months before coming to outlying screens.

A selling point to seeing these films theatrically was that they were being shown in color, at a time when most people had only black-and-white TVs (and indeed the two first-season episodes that were expanded to feature length, while filmed in color, had only been broadcast in black-and-white). The words "in color" featured prominently on the trailers, TV spots, and posters for the film releases. The episodes used to make U.N.C.L.E. films were not included in the packages of television episodes screened outside the United States.

Subsequent two-part episodes, beginning with the second season premiere, "Alexander the Greater Affair", retitled One Spy Too Many for its theatrical release, were developed into one complete feature film with only occasional extra sexy and violent footage added to them, sometimes as just inserts. In the case of One Spy Too Many, a subplot featuring Yvonne Craig as an U.N.C.L.E. operative carrying on a flirtatious relationship with Solo was also added to the film; Craig does not appear in the television episodes.

The later films were not released in America, only overseas, but the first few did well in American theaters and remain one of the rare examples of a television show released in paid theatrical engagements. With the exception of the two-part episode "The Five Daughters Affair", shown as part of Granada Plus's run of the series, the episodes which became films have never aired on British television.

The films in the series:

- To Trap a Spy (1964)
- The Spy with My Face (1965)
- One Spy Too Many (1966)
- One of Our Spies Is Missing (1966)
- The Spy in the Green Hat (1966)
- The Karate Killers (1967)
- The Helicopter Spies (1968)
- How to Steal the World (1968)

=== 2015 remake ===
A film adaptation of the television series was produced by Warner Bros. and Turner Entertainment, and was released in 2015. Directed by Guy Ritchie, the film stars Armie Hammer, Henry Cavill, and Hugh Grant as Kuryakin, Solo, and Waverly, respectively. Filming began in September 2013, and the film was released on August 14, 2015. The film received mixed reviews.

== In other media ==
=== Soundtrack albums ===
Although album recordings of the series had been made by Hugo Montenegro and many orchestras cover versions of the title theme, it wasn't until 2002 that the first of three double-disc albums of original music from the series were released through Film Score Monthly (FSM).

=== Comic books ===
Several comic books based on the series were published. In the US, there was a Gold Key Comics series which ran for twenty-two issues from February 1965 to April 1969. Entertainment Publishing released an eleven-issue series of one- and two-part stories from January 1987 to September 1988 that updated U.N.C.L.E. to the 1980s, while largely ignoring the reunion TV film. A two-part comics story, "The Birds of Prey Affair", was put out by Millennium Publications in 1993, which showcased the return of a smaller, more-streamlined version of Thrush, controlled by Dr. Egret, who had melded with the Ultimate Computer. The script was written by Mark Ellis and Terry Collins, with artwork by Nick Choles, and transplanted the characters into the 1990s.

Two Man from U.N.C.L.E. strips were originated for the British market in the 1960s (some Gold Key material was also reprinted), the most notable for Lady Penelope comic, which launched in January 1966. This was replaced by a Girl from U.N.C.L.E. strip in January 1967. Man from U.N.C.L.E. also featured in the short-lived title Solo (published between February and September 1967) and some text stories appeared in TV Tornado.

In 2015–2016, DC Comics launched Batman '66 Meets the Man from U.N.C.L.E., a crossover with its Batman '66 series.

=== Novels ===
The first Man from U.N.C.L.E. novel, by Michael Avallone. Pictured: Robert Vaughn.

Two dozen novels were based upon Man from U.N.C.L.E. and published between 1965 and 1968. Unhampered by television censors, the novels were generally grittier and more violent than the televised episodes. The series sold in the millions, and was the largest TV-novel tie-in franchise until surpassed by Dark Shadows and Star Trek.

1. The Man from U.N.C.L.E. (a.k.a. The Thousand Coffins Affair) by Michael Avallone. When villages in Africa and Scotland are wiped out by a plague of madness, Solo and Kuryakin dig up a graveyard and a monster named Golgotha.
2. The Doomsday Affair by Harry Whittington. The agents must find the mystery man "Tixe Ylno" before he triggers war between the US and the USSR.
3. The Copenhagen Affair by John Oram. UFOs are buzzing Europe, and the U.N.C.L.E. agents crisscross Denmark to find the factory before Thrush launches an armed fleet.
4. The Dagger Affair by David McDaniel. DAGGER fanatics have an energy damper that can shut down electrical fields, atomic reactions, and human beings, and even Thrush is panicked. This is the novel in which McDaniel introduced the acronym for Thrush, though it was never used by any other of the novelists nor on the show itself.
5. The Mad Scientist Affair by John T. Phillifent. The agents stop biochemist "King Mike" from poisoning London, then discover his second plan is to contaminate the entire North Sea.
6. The Vampire Affair by David McDaniel. Napoleon and Illya don't believe in vampires and werewolves, but an U.N.C.L.E. agent has died, so they must investigate an ancient castle in Transylvanian Romania.
7. The Radioactive Camel Affair by Peter Leslie. Solo joins a caravan and Kuryakin threads a war zone to reach a missile base deep in the Sudan hinterlands.
8. The Monster Wheel Affair by David McDaniel. The agents canvass the globe and infiltrate a remote island to confirm an inexplicable space station belongs to Egypt.
9. The Diving Dames Affair by Peter Leslie. The deaths of two merry missionaries lead the agents to the plains of Brazil and a giant dam with no apparent purpose.
10. The Assassination Affair by J. Hunter Holly. Surviving assassins' bullets and a "do-it-yourself murder room", the agents follow Thrush to desolated Michigan farms and a scheme to starve the world.
11. The Invisibility Affair by Thomas Stratton (Robert Coulson and Gene DeWeese). The agents track an invisible dirigible to a submarine in Lake Michigan – and a plot to hijack an entire country.
12. The Mind Twisters Affair by Thomas Stratton. People in a college town are unaccountably catatonic, euphoric, and raging. The agents must ferret out who and how before the "experiment" goes nationwide.
13. The Rainbow Affair by David McDaniel. The agents consult every classic fictional spy and detective in England to find the world's best bank robber before Thrush can recruit or kill him. Notable for unnamed cameos by The Saint, Miss Marple, John Steed, Emma Peel, Willie Garvin, Tommy Hambledon, Neddie Seagoon, Father Brown, a retired Sherlock Holmes (aged nearly 100), and Dr. Fu Manchu.
14. The Cross of Gold Affair by Fredric Davies (Ron Ellik and Fredric Langley). Clues hidden in crossword puzzles lead the agents, hippies, and frogmen to a Coney Island death-trap to stop the biggest heist in history.
15. The Utopia Affair by David McDaniel. Solo must command U.N.C.L.E. North America while Waverly is on a forced six-week vacation, and an undercover Illya tries to protect Waverly from Thrush assassins.
16. The Splintered Sunglasses Affair by Peter Leslie
17. The Hollow Crown Affair by David McDaniel. In the last published David McDaniel novel, Thrush Agent Ward and Irene Baldwin from The Dagger Affair return in a battle against an U.N.C.L.E. lab chief who has defected to Thrush.
18. The Unfair Fare Affair by Peter Leslie
19. The Power Cube Affair by John T. Phillifent
20. The Corfu Affair by John T. Phillifent
21. The Thinking Machine Affair by Joel Bernard
22. The Stone Cold Dead in the Market Affair by John Oram
23. The Finger in the Sky Affair by Peter Leslie
24. The Final Affair by David McDaniel. Never published, but available online. Waverly has a plan to capture or destroy Thrush's ultra-computers, isolating the many satraps to crush Thrush forever. But as the "final affair" gets underway, ghosts from the past return. Some live and some die as a new order arises.

Volumes 10–15 and 17 of the series were only published in the United States. Souvenir Press used a different numbering (from Ace) for their editions.

Whitman Publishing published three hardcover novels aimed at young readers: The Affair of the Gunrunners' Gold and The Affair of the Gentle Saboteur by Brandon Keith, and The Calcutta Affair by George S. Elrick.

Rare children's storybook based upon The Man from U.N.C.L.E. Left to right: David McCallum, Robert Vaughn and Leo G. Carroll.

A children's storybook was written by Walter B. Gibson entitled The Coin of El Diablo Affair.

The digest-sized Man from U.N.C.L.E. Magazine featured original novella continuing the adventures of Solo and Kuryakin. Published under the house name "Robert Hart Davis", they were written by such authors as John Jakes, Dennis Lynds, and Bill Pronzini. 24 issues, which also offered original crime and spy-fiction short stories and novelettes, and occasional SF and fantasy reprints under the title "Department of Lost Stories", ran monthly from February 1966 to January 1968. An additional novella entitled "The Vanishing City Affair" was advertised on page 140 of the January 1968 issue for the proposed (but never published) February 1968 issue. It is as yet unconfirmed, however, if this novella was shelved for possible future release elsewhere or if it was ever written at all.

=== TV Annuals ===
There have been four TV Annuals published in UK between 1967 and 1970 by World Distributors which features written stories and reprint of a Gold Key Comics story which were never published in the UK.

== Home media ==
MGM/UA Home Video released eight volumes, featuring two episodes each, on home video on September 25, 1991.

In November 2007, after coming to an agreement with Warner Bros. Home Entertainment, Time Life released a 41 DVD set (region 1) for direct order, with sales through stores scheduled for fall 2008. An earlier release by Anchor Bay, allegedly set for 2006, was apparently scuttled because of a dispute over the rights to the series with Warner Home Video.

On October 21, 2008, the Time-Life set was released to retail outlets in Region 1 (North America) in a special all-seasons box set contained within a small briefcase. The complete-series set consists of 41 DVDs, including two discs of special features included exclusively with the box set. Included in the set was the Solo pilot episode, as well as one of the films, One Spy Too Many. Paramount Pictures and CBS Home Entertainment released Return of the Man from U.N.C.L.E. to DVD in Region 1 on March 3, 2009.

On August 23, 2011, Warner Archive Collection released The Man from U.N.C.L.E. 8-Movie Collection on DVD via its "manufacture on demand" service. On November 4, 2014, Warner Home Video released the complete series set on DVD in Region 1 in a new repackaged version. On August 4, 2015, Warner Home Video released an individual release of season 1 on DVD in Region 1. Season 2 was released on February 2, 2016.

In Region 2, Warner Bros. released the complete series set on DVD in the UK. It also released a separate film collection on September 8, 2003. The DVD contains five of the eight films, missing the following: To Trap a Spy (1964), The Spy in the Green Hat (1966) and One of Our Spies is Missing (1966).

On March 26, 2012, Fabulous Films released Return of the Man from U.N.C.L.E. on Region 2 DVD.

=== Merchandise ===
Licensed merchandise included Gilbert action figures, Aurora plastic model kits, lunch boxes, and toy guns.

An example of this, the Louis Marx "Target Gun Set", a dart-gun shooting-game released in the form of a quasi-playset, is built around the setting of U.N.C.L.E. headquarters in New York City. Art on the cardboard stand displays both the U.N.C.L.E. and Thrush logos, and a half-dozen soft plastic figures per "side" were provided, including Solo, Kuryakin and Waverly. The game measures 57 by 18 inches (145 cm × 46 cm); the figures, at 6 inches (15 cm), represent one of the few attempts Marx made at supplementing its 6-inch figure line. The U.N.C.L.E. figures are cast in blue, except for a single (unnamed) figure in tan; Thrush agents are cast in gray. Marx was released an arcade game licensed under The Man from U.N.C.L.E.

Corgi Toys produced a die-cast toy model of the "Thrushbuster", an Oldsmobile 88, with figures of 'Napoleon Solo' and 'Illya Kuryakin' which popped in and out of the car windows firing guns by pressing down on a model periscope protruding through the roof.

== See also ==
- Illya Kuryakin
- Napoleon Solo
- U.N.C.L.E.
- The Man from U.N.C.L.E. (film) – 2015 remake
