= The Man from U.N.C.L.E. (film) =

2015 spy film directed by Guy Ritchie

- Theatrical release poster
- Directed by: Guy Ritchie
- Screenplay by: Guy Ritchie; Lionel Wigram
- Story by: Jeff Kleeman; David C. Wilson; Guy Ritchie; Lionel Wigram
- Based on: The Man from U.N.C.L.E. by: Sam Rolfe; Norman Felton
- Produced by: John Davis; Steve Clark-Hall; Lionel Wigram; Guy Ritchie
- Starring: Henry Cavill; Armie Hammer; Alicia Vikander; Elizabeth Debicki; Hugh Grant
- Cinematography: John Mathieson
- Edited by: James Herbert
- Music by: Daniel Pemberton
- Production companies: RatPac-Dune Entertainment; Ritchie/Wigram Films; Davis Entertainment
- Distributed by: Warner Bros. Pictures
- Release dates: August 2, 2015 (Barcelona); August 14, 2015 (United States)
- Running time: 116 minutes
- Countries: United States; United Kingdom
- Language: English
- Budget: $75–84 million
- Box office: $110 million

The Man from U.N.C.L.E. is a 2015 spy film directed by Guy Ritchie and written by Ritchie and Lionel Wigram. It is based on the 1964 MGM television series of the same name, which was created by Norman Felton and Sam Rolfe. The film stars Henry Cavill, Armie Hammer, Alicia Vikander, Elizabeth Debicki, and Hugh Grant. The film was produced by RatPac-Dune Entertainment and Davis Entertainment while Turner Entertainment Co., the original TV series current holder, was also involved.

In 1993, John Davis obtained the rights for a film adaptation based on the original series. However, the film fell into development limbo due to multiple script rewrites. Over the years, Matthew Vaughn, David Dobkin, and Steven Soderbergh were optioned for directing until Ritchie signed on in March 2013.

The film premiered at Barcelona on August 2, 2015, and was released on August 14, 2015, by Warner Bros. Pictures. It received mixed reviews from critics and was a box office bomb, grossing only $110 million worldwide on a $75 million budget. Rolling Stone listed this movie 50th on the best action movies of all time.

== Plot ==
In 1963, CIA Agent Napoleon Solo extracts Gaby Teller, daughter of nuclear scientist Dr. Udo Teller, from East Berlin. She does not know him, as she was left to be raised by a mechanic almost two decades ago. Solo and KGB Agent Illya Kuryakin are ordered to team up and stop Alexander and Victoria Vinciguerra, Nazi sympathizers, from using Udo Teller to build their own private nuclear weapon.

Unbeknownst to Solo, Kuryakin has been fully briefed on him. Solo, a former WWII soldier, became a skilled high-profile thief, who was recruited by the CIA rather than face jail time. The KGB operative is told to not let Gaby escape, and to kill Solo if necessary.

The men travel to Rome with Gaby, whose uncle Rudi works for the Vinciguerras. Kuryakin and Gaby pose as an engaged couple so that Kuryakin can access the Vinciguerras. Ordinary muggers take Kuryakin's father's watch, but he does not fight them in order to maintain his cover. Solo and Kuryakin break into a Vinciguerra shipping yard and find traces of uranium. While escaping by water, Kuryakin nearly drowns, but Solo saves him.

The following day, Gaby meets with Rudi and Alexander and betrays Kuryakin and Solo to them. Rudi tortures Solo, but Kuryakin rescues him and tortures Rudi. Rudi reveals the weapon is hidden in an island fortress where Gaby has been reunited with her father. Teller completes the weapon, and Victoria kills him.

Solo and Kuryakin are approached by Alexander Waverly, a MI6 officer who reveals Gaby is his undercover officer. They infiltrate the Vinciguerras' compound. Solo finds Kuryakin's stolen watch on a guard. Alexander Vinciguerra attempts to escape with the warhead, but is intercepted and killed.

Solo retrieves the disc with Teller's research but realizes Alexander's warhead was a decoy—Victoria has left with the real warhead. He then distracts Victoria via radio while Waverly launches a homing missile, destroying the nuclear weapon and killing Victoria.

Kuryakin confronts Solo in his hotel room, and Solo returns the stolen watch. Kuryakin admits his assignment was to kill him and take the disc for his government. Solo replies that he knew this, and had the same orders. They instead burn the contents of the disc, to give neither side the upper hand in the arms race.

Reuniting with Gaby and Waverly, the trio have been reassigned to Waverly's international organization. Waverly gives them a new mission under a new codename: U.N.C.L.E.

== Cast ==
- Henry Cavill as Napoleon Solo
- Armie Hammer as Illya Kuryakin
- Alicia Vikander as Gaby Teller
- Elizabeth Debicki as Victoria Vinciguerra
- Sylvester Groth as Uncle Rudi
- Christian Berkel as Udo Teller
- Luca Calvani as Alexander Vinciguerra
- Misha Kuznetsov as Oleg
- Jared Harris as Adrian Sanders
- Hugh Grant as Alexander Waverly

== Production ==
=== Development ===
Producer John Davis optioned the film rights to the 1960s TV series in 1993, setting up a development deal for an adaptation with Warner Bros. and series producer Norman Felton. Davis has estimated that he commissioned 12 or 14 different scripts over the course of 20 years, with writers Jim and John Thomas, John Requa, Glenn Ficarra, and Scott Z. Burns. Quentin Tarantino was briefly attached following the success of Pulp Fiction, but opted to make Jackie Brown instead. The Man from U.N.C.L.E. continued to labor in development hell with directors Matthew Vaughn and David Dobkin. Steven Soderbergh was attached to direct Scott Z. Burns' screenplay, with production slated to begin in March 2012. Executives from Warner Bros. wanted the budget to stay below $60 million, but Soderbergh felt that amount would not be adequate to fund the 1960s-era sets, props, and international settings required for the film. Emily Blunt was nearly cast as the female lead, but she left the project shortly after Soderbergh departed in November 2011.

Guy Ritchie signed on in March 2013. On July 31, 2013, it was announced that Ritchie's adaptation would start filming in September 2013 in London and Italy. The final production budget was approximately $75 million US.

=== Casting ===
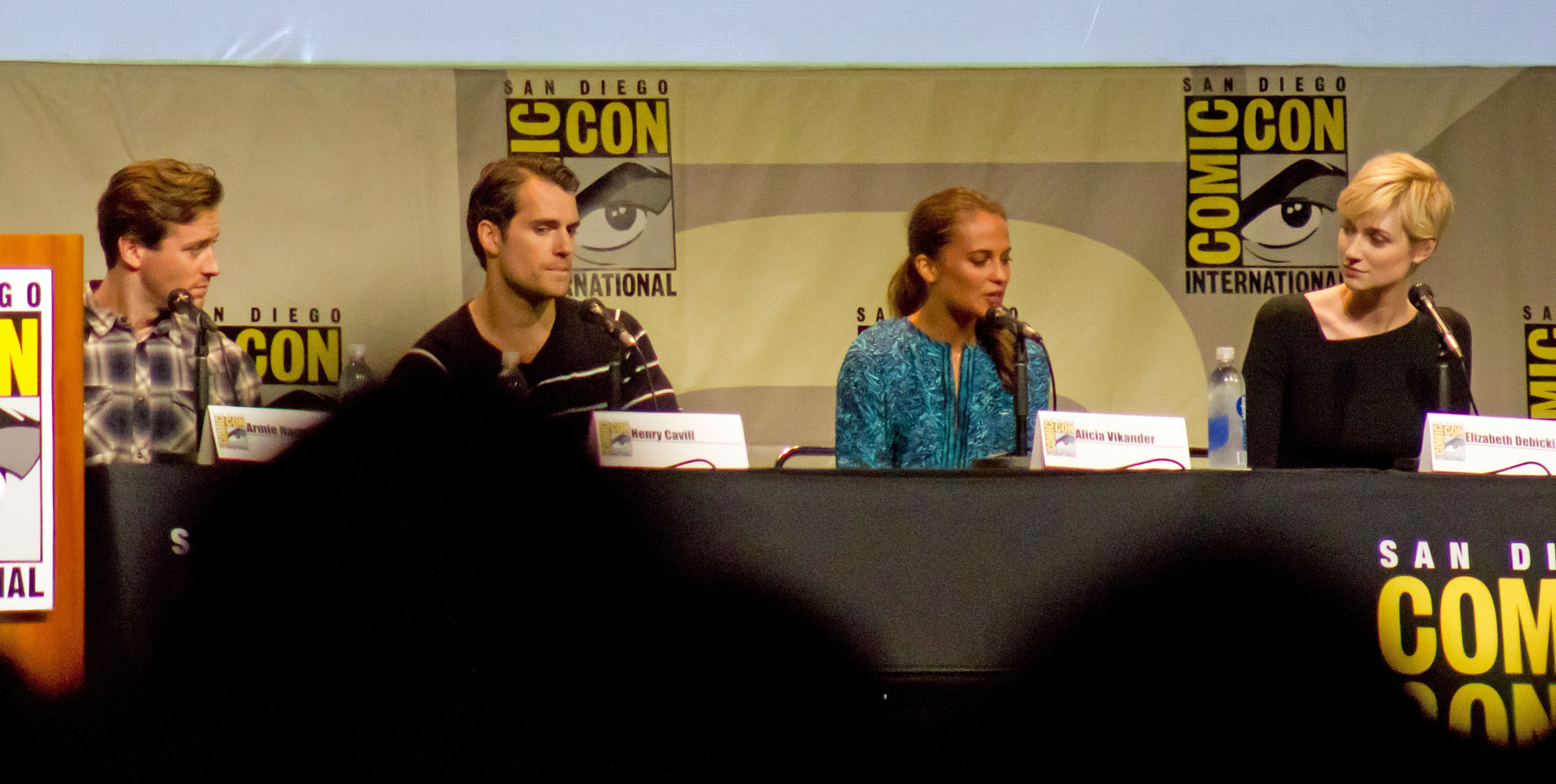
Armie Hammer (Ilya Kuryakin), Henry Cavill (Napoleon Solo), Alicia Vikander (Gaby Teller) and Elizabeth Debicki (Victoria Vinciguerra) at 2015 San Diego Comic-Con.

In November 2010, George Clooney showed interest in the film, and was in talks for the lead role of Napoleon Solo, but he left in September 2011 due to a recurring back injury. After Clooney's departure, actors including Joseph Gordon-Levitt, Ryan Gosling, Channing Tatum, Alexander Skarsgård, Ewan McGregor, Robert Pattinson, Matt Damon, Christian Bale, Michael Fassbender, Bradley Cooper, Leonardo DiCaprio, Joel Kinnaman, Russell Crowe, Chris Pine, Ryan Reynolds, and Jon Hamm were considered for the lead role. On March 18, 2013, Tom Cruise was in early talks to take the lead in the film. Armie Hammer was cast in the second lead role as Illya Kuryakin on April 24, 2013, with Cruise set as Solo. Swedish actress Alicia Vikander joined the film on May 8, 2013, as the female lead. On May 23, 2013, Cruise dropped out of the film, due to his commitment to Mission: Impossible – Rogue Nation. British actor Henry Cavill replaced Cruise. Elizabeth Debicki was cast in a femme fatale role on July 31, 2013; Rose Byrne and Charlize Theron were earlier considered for the same part. On August 8, 2013, Hugh Grant joined the cast as Alexander Waverly, the head of United Network Command for Law and Enforcement (U.N.C.L.E). Jared Harris was cast as Sanders on September 4, 2013, and Luca Calvani was cast as a villain, Alexander. Simona Caparrini was also cast to play Contessa.

=== Filming ===
Principal photography on the film commenced on September 9, 2013. In October 2013, filming was being under way at the Old Royal Naval College in Greenwich, Royal Victoria Docks, London and Goodwood Motor Racing Circuit in West Sussex, UK.

Three locations stood in place for Berlin sites on either side of the wall: the opening scene exterior shots were filmed on Padfield Road in London, the public toilet fight between Solo and Kuryakin was shot in Regent's Park in London, while the car chase during the movie's first act was shot in Chatham Historic Dockyard, Kent UK.

Director Guy Ritchie finalized the script throughout production: "He's quite intuitive and tends to constantly rewrite stuff, which he does even when they're shooting. He'll rewrite things in the morning if they're shooting that day, working with the actors if something doesn't feel right." says long-term collaborator David Allcock.

=== Music ===
The musical score for The Man from U.N.C.L.E. was composed by Daniel Pemberton. A soundtrack album was released by WaterTower Music on August 7, 2015. A behind the scenes video was also released. The musical score received many glowing reviews with the LA Times noting "it is composer Daniel Pemberton who in some ways seems to understand the idea of the movie even better than Ritchie, his score featuring breathy flutes, twangy guitar, spooky harpsichord and pounding drums and organ capturing the mixture of pastiche, homage and a twist of the new in a way the rest of the film rarely matches."

== Release ==
The film was scheduled for a January 16, 2015 release, but on August 12, 2014, Warner Bros moved the film's release date from January 16, 2015, to August 14, 2015.

=== Home media ===
The Man from U.N.C.L.E. was released on DVD and Blu-ray on November 17, 2015, by Warner Bros. Home Entertainment.

== Reception ==
=== Box office ===
The Man from U.N.C.L.E. grossed $45.4 million in North America and $64.4 million in other territories for a worldwide total of $109.8 million, against a production budget of $75 million. The Hollywood Reporter estimated the film lost the studio at least $80 million, when factoring together all expenses and revenues.

The film grossed $900,000 from its early Thursday screenings and $4.8 million on its opening day. In its opening weekend, the film grossed $13.4 million, which was about $5 million below expectations, finishing third at the box office. In its second weekend it dropped 45% to $7.3 million, finishing fifth.

It opened in Russia with $3.1 million. In the United Kingdom, it opened alongside Sony Pictures' Pixels, earning $2.3 million, debuting at number 4 for Friday-to-Sunday, while Pixels was at No. 1 with $4.2 million, including previews during the week. Warner Bros did not preview The Man from U.N.C.L.E. Across Asia, it generated $2.7 million from six countries and $1.7 million in Australia.

=== Critical response ===
On Rotten Tomatoes, the film has an approval rating of 68% based on 295 reviews, with an average rating of 6.20/10. The site's critical consensus reads, "The Man from U.N.C.L.E. tries to distract from an unremarkable story with charismatic stars and fizzy set pieces, adding up to an uneven action thriller with just enough style to overcome its lack of substance." On Metacritic, the film has a weighted average score of 56 out of 100, based on 40 critics, indicating "mixed or average reviews". On CinemaScore, audiences gave the film an average grade of "B" on an A+ to F scale.

=== Accolades ===
Award	Category	Recipient(s)	Result	Ref.
Golden Trailer Awards	Best Action	"Better Alone"	Nominated	
Golden Trailer Awards	Best Motion/Title Graphics	"Timeline"	Won	
Golden Trailer Awards	Best Graphics in a TV Spot	"That Kind of Review"	Won	
San Diego Film Critics Society Awards	Body of Work	Alicia Vikander (also for Burnt, The Danish Girl and Ex Machina)	Won	

== Possible sequel ==
In April 2017, it was reported that Wigram was working on the script for a sequel at the suggestion of Hammer. Cavill stated that he would be excited to return for the sequel.

However, as of 2026, no sequel has been officially announced or entered production. In an interview with MovieWeb, Cavill stated that while he enjoyed working on the film, a sequel is unlikely. This is due to the original's modest box office performance and lack of studio movement.

== Video game ==
A 3D action game based on the film titled Mission: Berlin was released on iOS and Android. It featured sneaking, shooting, and getting in and out of drivable vehicles in the style of open world games. The player can choose to play as Solo or Kuryakin. There was also a multiplayer death match. As of December 2018, the game has been removed from both marketplaces.
