= Henry Cavill =

British actor (born 1983)

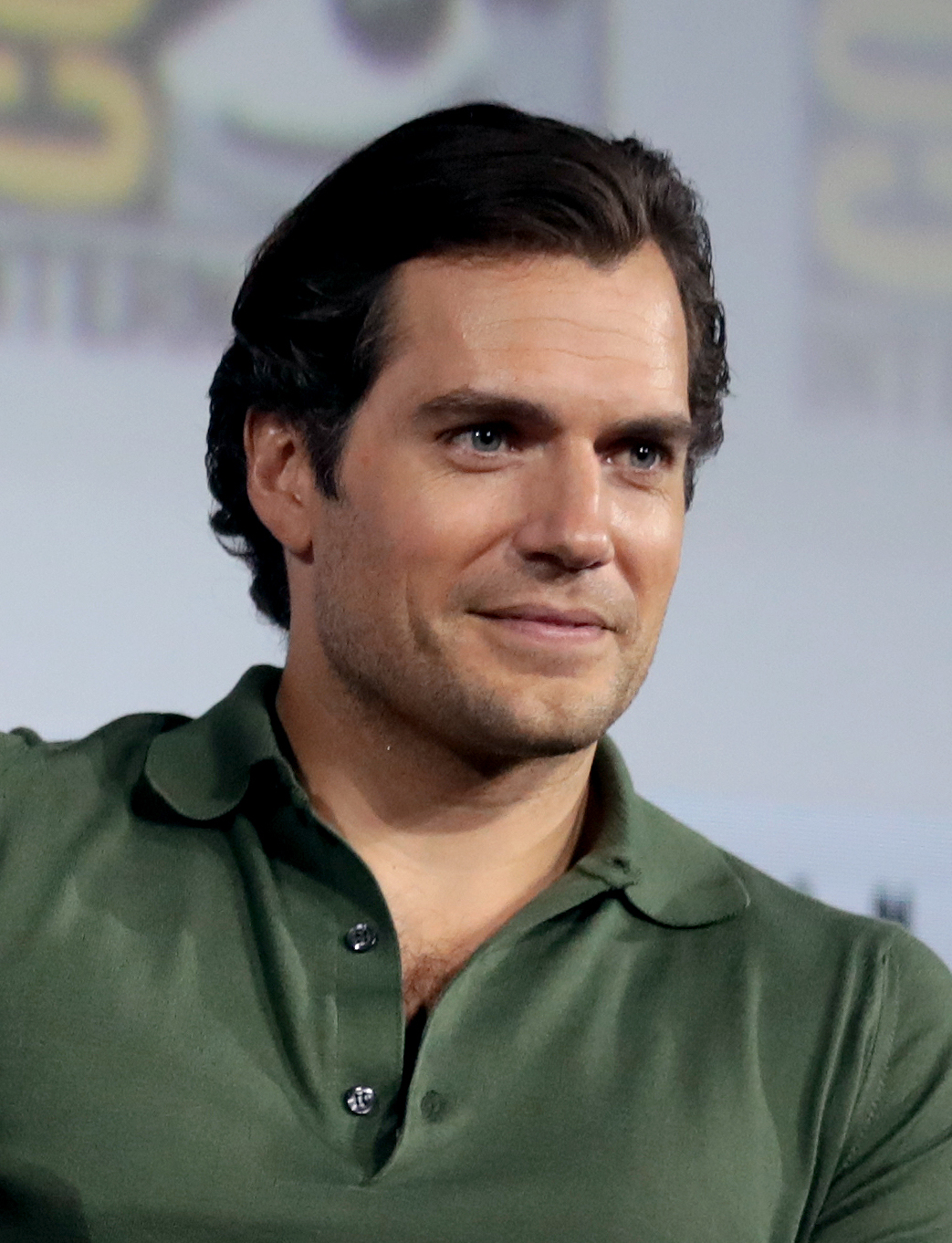
- Cavill in 2019
- Born: Henry William Dalgliesh Cavill; 5 May 1983 (age 43); St Helier, Jersey
- Occupation: Actor
- Years active: 2001–present
- Partner: Natalie Viscuso (2021–present)
- Children: 1

Henry William Dalgliesh Cavill (/ˈkævəl/ KAV-əl; born 5 May 1983) is a British actor. He gained wide recognition for portraying Superman in the DC Extended Universe (2013–2023), beginning with the film Man of Steel (2013) and reprising the role in Batman v Superman: Dawn of Justice (2016), Justice League (2017), and Black Adam (2022).

Cavill made his television debut in 2002 with a role on The Inspector Lynley Mysteries. He then played Charles Brandon in the Showtime series The Tudors (2007–2010), which earned him critical acclaim. He has since starred as Geralt of Rivia in Netflix's The Witcher (2019–2023).

Cavill began his film career in 2001 with a role in Laguna and later starred as Theseus in Immortals (2011), as Napoleon Solo in The Man from U.N.C.L.E. (2015), as Sherlock Holmes in the Enola Holmes film series (2020–present), and as Gus March-Phillipps in The Ministry of Ungentlemanly Warfare (2024). His other film credits include the action film Night Hunter (2018) and the spy films Mission: Impossible – Fallout (2018), and Argylle (2024).

== Early life ==
Cavill was born on 5 May 1983, the fourth of five boys, in a Catholic family in Saint Helier, Jersey, in the Channel Islands. His Jersey-born mother, Marianne (Dalgliesh), is of Scottish, English and Irish heritage and worked as a secretary in a bank. His father, Colin Cavill, was born in Chester, England, and is a former stockbroker. He was educated at St Michael's Preparatory School in Saint Saviour, Jersey, before attending Stowe School in Stowe, Buckinghamshire.

At Stowe, Cavill was active in both sport and drama. He portrayed a member of the T-Birds in a 1999 school production of Grease and took the lead role in a performance of Dogg's Hamlet, which was made by his own Grafton house as their submission for an intra-school drama festival. He played field hockey for the 1st XI and rugby for the 3rd XV.

In 2000, while playing rugby, 16-year-old Cavill met actor Russell Crowe, who was shooting on location at Stowe for the film Proof of Life. The actor shared some acting tips and later sent Cavill a package. The two actors later worked together on Man of Steel.

== Career ==
=== 2001–2010: Career beginnings and The Tudors ===
Cavill began his film career with a role in Laguna (2001) and Kevin Reynolds' adaptation of The Count of Monte Cristo (2002). He continued with appearances in BBC's The Inspector Lynley Mysteries (2002), the television film Goodbye, Mr. Chips (2002) and the television series Midsomer Murders (2003). In 2003, he had a supporting role in I Capture the Castle, followed by Hellraiser: Hellworld (2005), Red Riding Hood (2006) and Tristan & Isolde (2006). He had a minor role in Matthew Vaughn's adaptation of Stardust (2007).

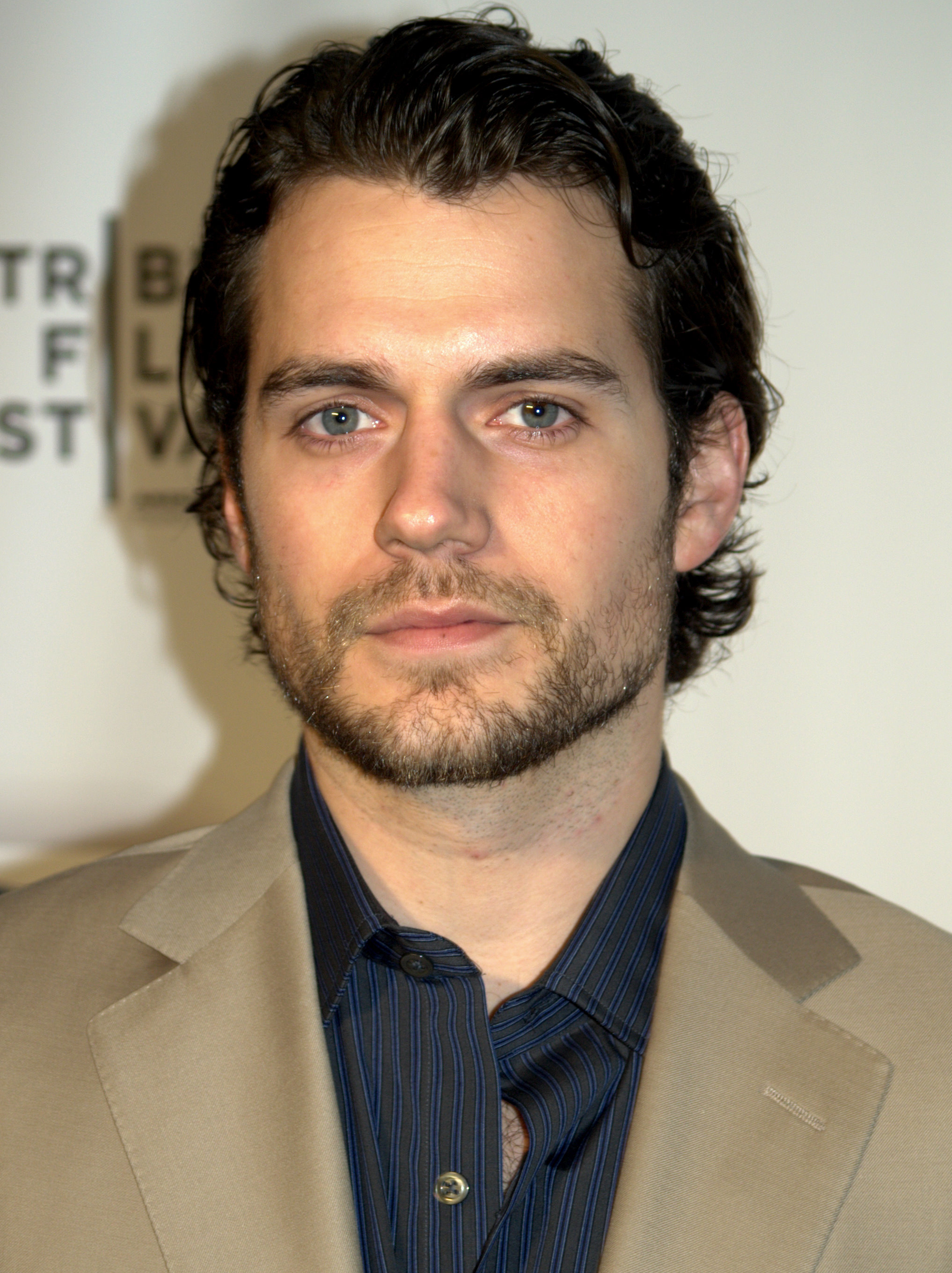
Cavill attending the premiere of Whatever Works at the 2009 Tribeca Film Festival

From 2007 to 2010, Cavill had a leading role in Showtime's television series The Tudors, as Charles Brandon, 1st Duke of Suffolk. The series was commercially well-received and it went on to be nominated for a Golden Globe in 2007 and won an Emmy in 2008. Cavill gave the show credit for bolstering his career: "It's done the most for me to date. [...] Now that there's an audience somewhere in America that's aware of who I am, I have more sell-ability, because of The Tudors." Entertainment Weekly named him the "Most Dashing Duke" and praised his work on The Tudors for displaying "charm, depth and a killer bod".

Cavill had been set to play Superman in McG's 2004 film, Superman: Flyby. McG pulled out of the project and direction was taken over by director Bryan Singer, who recast Brandon Routh as the lead in Superman Returns. Cavill was also the cause of a write-in effort from fans to see him cast as Cedric Diggory in Harry Potter and the Goblet of Fire (2005). The role eventually went to Robert Pattinson. Stephenie Meyer, the author of the Twilight series, was outspoken in favour of Cavill playing the character of Edward Cullen in the Twilight film, calling him her "perfect Edward". However, by the time production of the film began, Cavill was too old to play the character, and again the role went to Pattinson. Despite reports that he was a contender for Batman in Batman Begins, Cavill confirmed that he never auditioned for, nor was offered, the role.

In 2005, Cavill was a final choice for the role of James Bond in Casino Royale. The producers and director Martin Campbell were torn between him and Daniel Craig; reportedly Campbell supported Cavill but the producers preferred an older Bond, and Craig ultimately landed the role.

While appearing in The Tudors, Cavill starred in director Joel Schumacher's horror film, Blood Creek (2008), and had a supporting role in Woody Allen's comedy film Whatever Works (2009). He went on to play the lead role of Theseus in Tarsem Singh's mythological film, Immortals, released 11 November 2011, and starred, alongside Bruce Willis, in The Cold Light of Day released in 2012.

=== 2011–2023: Superman and mainstream success ===
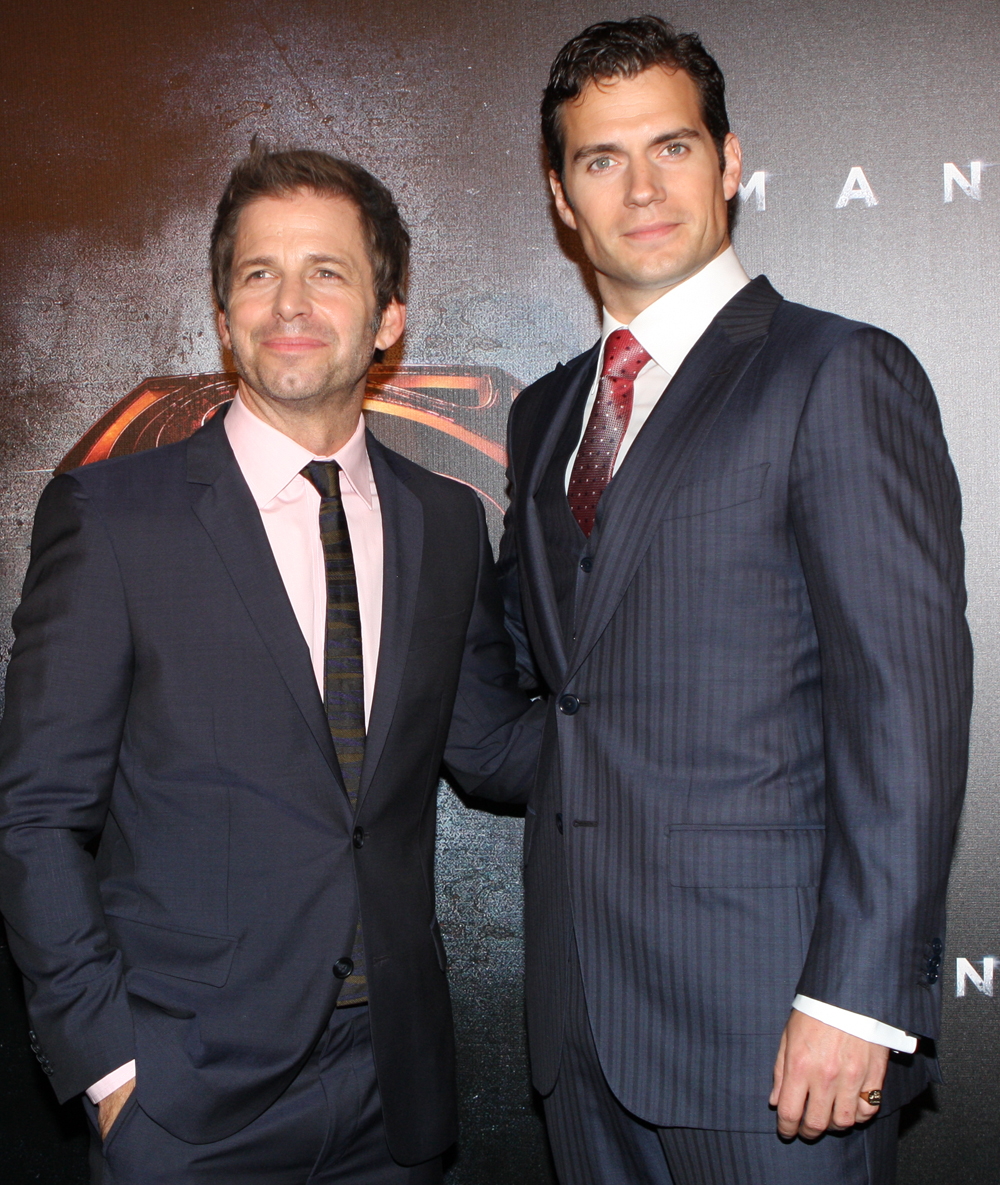
Cavill and Zack Snyder at the 2013 Man of Steel movie premiere in Sydney

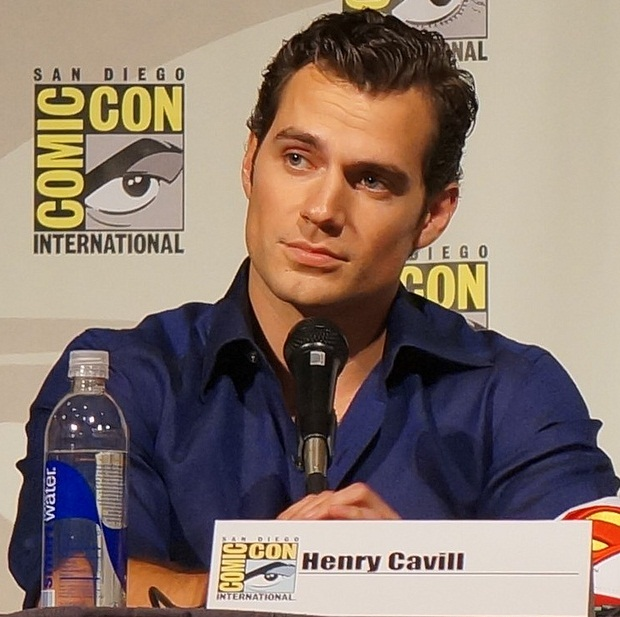
Cavill at the 2013 San Diego Comic-Con

On 30 January 2011, it was announced that Cavill had been cast in the role of Clark Kent / Superman in director Zack Snyder's Man of Steel. Snyder called Cavill "the perfect choice to don the cape and S shield." Entertainment media applauded Henry Cavill on his road to success. On being chosen for the role, Cavill commented, "In the pantheon of superheroes, Superman is the most recognized and revered character of all time, and I am honoured to be a part of his return to the big screen." Cavill reprised the role of Superman in Batman v Superman: Dawn of Justice, a 2016 sequel which featured a crossover with Batman and Wonder Woman. He attended San Diego Comic-Con in disguise to surprise the cast of Suicide Squad.

Cavill returned as Superman in the 2017 theatrical version of Justice League, which had been reworked by director Joss Whedon after Snyder left the project due to a family tragedy. He appeared again in Zack Snyder's Justice League which premiered on HBO Max in March 2021 after an intense fan campaign to see the Snyder cut, though he did not shoot any additional footage like some of his fellow cast members. His manager Dany Garcia said in 2016 that he was working on a new standalone Superman film. Directors Matthew Vaughn and Christopher McQuarrie were reportedly interested. Shortly after the release of Justice League, Cavill revealed he was under contract to play Superman in one more film.

In 2015, he co-starred with Armie Hammer in the film version of spy series The Man from U.N.C.L.E, directed by Guy Ritchie. In 2018, Cavill co-starred as August Walker in the action spy film Mission: Impossible – Fallout, the sixth installment of the film series. Later that year, he starred in the psychological thriller Night Hunter (originally titled Nomis). Cavill has expressed interest in taking over the role of James Bond after Daniel Craig leaves the role.

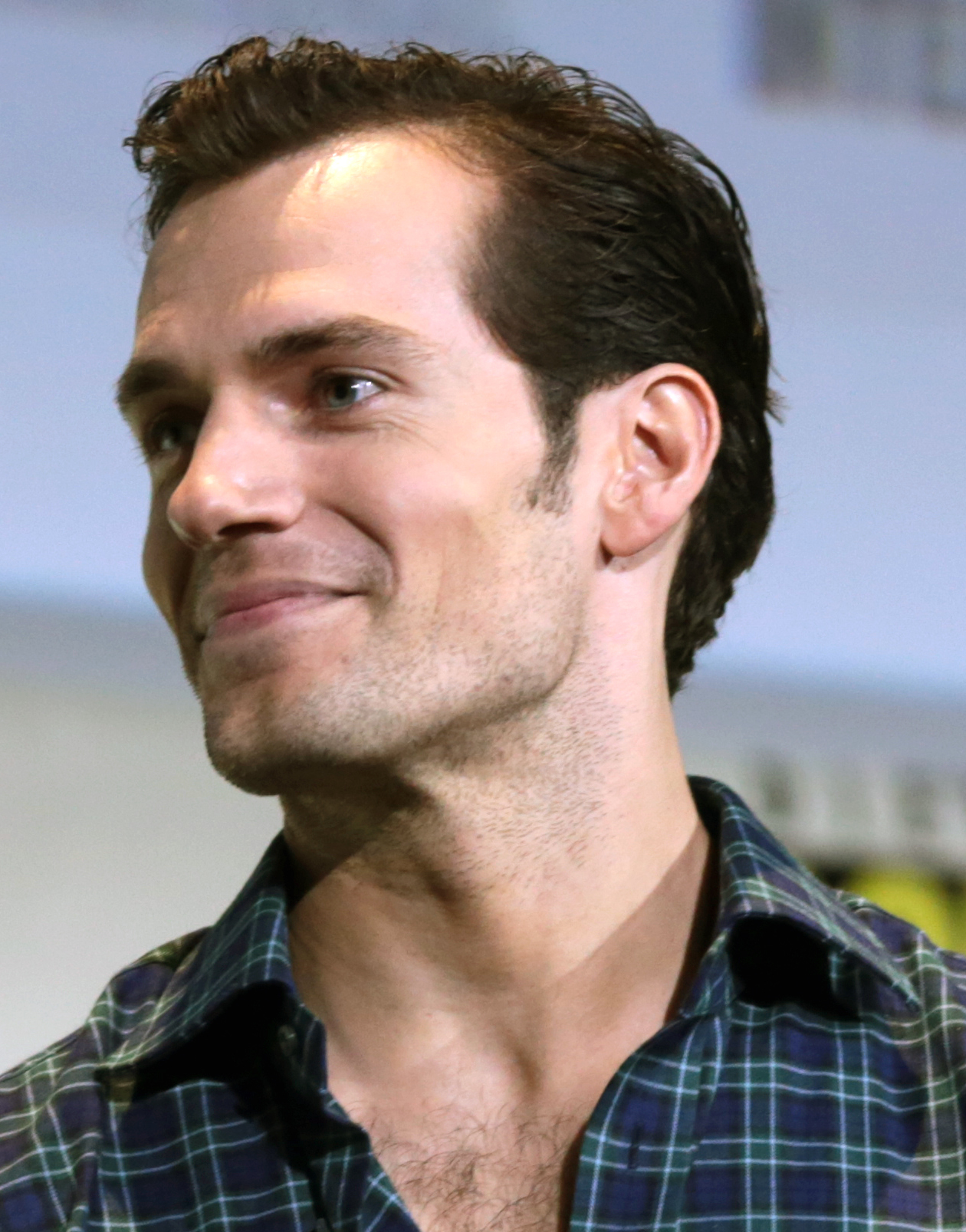
Cavill at the 2016 San Diego Comic-Con

From 2019 to 2023, Cavill portrayed the mutant monster hunter Geralt of Rivia in the hit Netflix fantasy drama The Witcher, an adaptation of the book series of the same name by Polish author Andrzej Sapkowski. The series premiered on 20 December 2019 and had its early premiere on Służewiec Racetrack in Warsaw on 18 December 2019. In late October 2022, Cavill and Netflix announced that he would exit from The Witcher after the third season released in 2023, and would be replaced by Liam Hemsworth.

In 2020, Cavill portrayed Sherlock Holmes in Legendary Entertainment's film adaptation of The Enola Holmes Mysteries, with Millie Bobby Brown starring in the eponymous role as the younger sister of the famous detective. In 2022, Cavill reprised his role as Sherlock in Enola Holmes 2. On 7 November 2023, Collider reported that Netflix was developing a screenplay for Enola Holmes 3.

In May 2021, it was announced that Cavill would portray Connor MacLeod in the reboot of Highlander. In July 2021, it was also announced that Cavill would join an all-star cast for director Matthew Vaughn's new spy film Argylle. The same month, an article by Deadline reported that he would star in The Rosie Project, directed by Steve Falk and based on the book of the same name, written by Australian author Graeme Simsion.

Despite previously departing the role, Cavill negotiated and signed a "one-off deal" with Warner Bros. Discovery to return as Superman for cameo appearances for Black Adam in 2022 and The Flash in 2023. He appeared in the mid-credit scene of Black Adam. Cavill then took to his instagram to announce his resumed involvement in the DCEU and confirmed his long term involvement for future films, having been told by the studio to do so. Due to a number of circumstances, (Note: Ties with Warner Bros. were severed in late-2018 after Cavill was unable to film a scheduled cameo appearance as Superman for the film Shazam!; Due to a dispute about Cavill's remaining contractual obligations following the theatrical release of Justice League in 2017 and being unavailable due to filming Mission: Impossible - Fallout. The shared universe continued branching out, but the role of Superman was never officially recast or immediately handled following these events. After five years of absence from the role due to the contractual disputes and obligations to other projects, Cavill publicly announced in October 2022 that he was officially returning to the role of Superman, and stated his cameo in the Black Adam was meant to set up future appearances. However in December 2022, less than two months later, Cavill released another statement that his return as Superman was no longer moving forward after he had a meeting with newly appointed DC Studios heads James Guun and Peter Safran who planned to reboot the DC Extended Universe and the Superman character within a new universe. For this reason another planned, and previously filmed, cameo Cavill had agreed to for the Flash film slated to release the following year was scrapped in post production and cut entirely from the final cut of the finished film.) his role in Black Adam ultimately became Cavill's final portrayal as Superman. His cameo in the Flash was subsequently removed in post-production, and reduced to a brief appearance that was made through the use of a computer-generated imagery (CGI) model bearing his likeness.

=== 2024–present: Post-Superman career ===
In April 2024, Cavill reunited with director Guy Ritchie on the World War II spy action film The Ministry of Ungentlemanly Warfare, with Jerry Bruckheimer producing. The film is based on a true story recounted in a book by British historian Damien Lewis. In July 2024, he made a surprise cameo appearance in the Marvel Cinematic Universe film Deadpool & Wolverine as a variant of Wolverine dubbed "Cavillrine". Cavill would reunite with Ritchie in the director's action thriller film In The Grey, which released in theater in May 2026.

Cavill is set to executive produce and star in projects related to the Warhammer 40,000 universe after Games Workshop finalized their deal with Amazon Studios in December 2024, having nailed down creative guidelines to bring the universe to screens big and small. Amazon Studios had earlier acquired global rights to the franchise in December 2022.

== Philanthropy ==
Cavill has been active in various charitable causes throughout his career. He serves as an ambassador for The Royal Marines Charity, supporting former Royal Marines and their families through financial assistance, mental health services, and transition aid, and launched the running phase of the Royal Marines 1664 Challenge and took part in The Gibraltar Rock Run 2014. He has also supported the Durrell Wildlife Conservation Trust, reflecting his commitment to animal welfare, and has participated in fundraising campaigns with Omaze to benefit veteran and conservation causes. In addition, he has taken part in charity runs and hospital visits, particularly aimed at supporting military veterans and children.

== Public image ==
Cavill has been frequently described in media as a sex symbol, with his charisma and physical presence highlighted as part of his appeal, though he himself resisted the label, stating: "I’ll never accept that I’m a sex symbol. That will mean that someone is a bit too fond of himself… People shouldn’t see me as a sex symbol. I’m really just Henry."

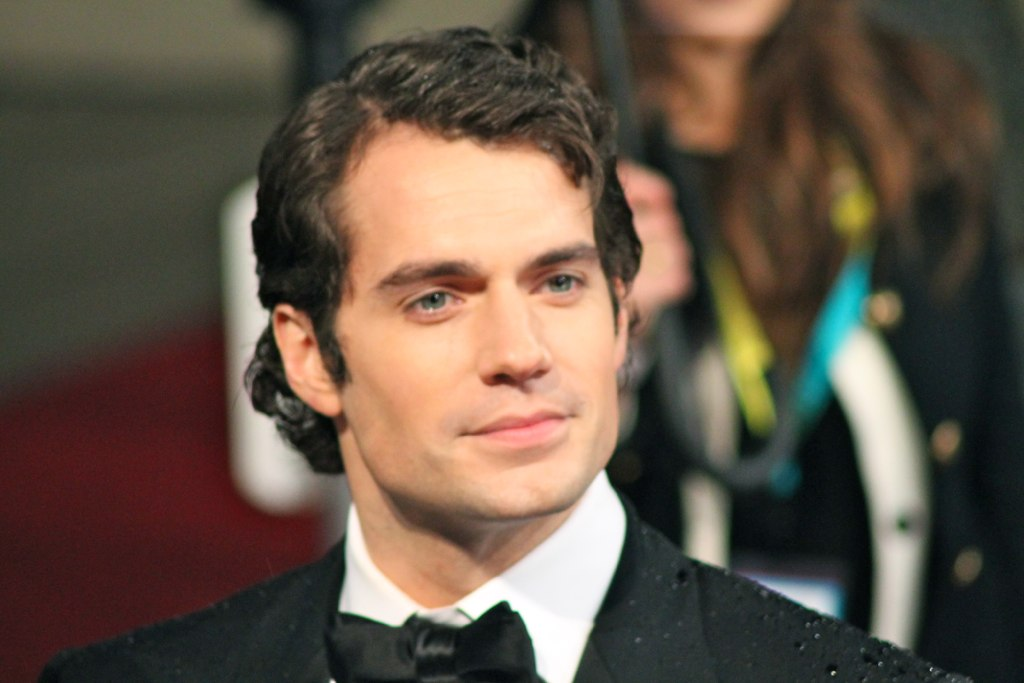
Cavill in 2013

Following his breakout role as Superman in Man of Steel (2013), entertainment outlets highlighted his physique and his looks, which have also been characterized as embodying "classic Hollywood", with fashion outlets noting his tall, muscular build, striking features, and red-carpet elegance, describing his tailored suits and polished style as part of his enduring image.

In 2012, Cavill was listed as one of GQ's 50 best-dressed British men. In December 2013, he was named "World's Sexiest Man" by British Glamour magazine. The same year, Empire magazine placed him third on their list of "The 100 Sexiest Movie Stars 2013".

In early 2008, Cavill became the face of the British fragrance Dunhill. He appeared in two television commercials for the brand.

Cavill's interest in video games has also contributed to a public persona associated with "nerd" culture.

== Personal life ==
Cavill resides in South Kensington, London. He was engaged to English show jumper Ellen Whitaker from 2011 until 2012. In May 2021, he announced that he was in a relationship with Natalie Viscuso, an American television executive. On 15 April 2024, it was announced that they were expecting their first child. In July 2025, in an interview with British GQ, Cavill revealed they had a daughter.

In 2016, Cavill started practising Brazilian jiu-jitsu, having been seen training at Roger Gracie's academy in London. Cavill supports the Jersey Rugby Club. While living in the United States, Cavill began to watch American football and became a supporter of the National Football League's (NFL) Kansas City Chiefs.

He has been an avid gamer since childhood, at one point missing a phone call from Zack Snyder telling him he got the role of Superman in Man of Steel (2013) because he was too busy playing World of Warcraft. He prefers PC gaming over consoles, having been introduced to it by his father when he was a young boy, and has been building and maintaining his own gaming computer. He credited his experience playing The Witcher video game series prior to the show's production with motivating him to seek out the role of Geralt. He has also named the Total War series of strategy games to be among his favourites, and in May 2020 it was announced that a new character paying tribute to Cavill and his Witcher character Geralt would be added to Total War: Warhammer II via DLC: Cavill, Loremaster of Hoeth. Cavill also enjoys the Warhammer 40,000 series of games and fiction, saying he "genuinely can't get enough of the lore they have built over the decades."

Cavill has sectoral heterochromia.

== Filmography ==
Key
†	Denotes films that have not yet been released

=== Film ===
Year	Title	Role	Notes	Ref.
2002	The Count of Monte Cristo	Albert Mondego		
2003	I Capture the Castle	Stephen Colley		
2005	Hellraiser: Hellworld	Mike		
2006	Tristan & Isolde	Melot		
2006	Red Riding Hood	The Hunter		
2007	Stardust	Humphrey		
2009	Whatever Works	Randy Lee James		
2009	Blood Creek	Evan Marshall		
2011	Immortals	Theseus		
2012	The Cold Light of Day	Will Shaw		
2013	Man of Steel	Clark Kent / Superman		
2015	The Man from U.N.C.L.E.	Napoleon Solo		
2016	Batman v Superman: Dawn of Justice	Clark Kent / Superman		
2017	Sand Castle	Capt. Syverson		
2017	Justice League	Clark Kent / Superman		
2018	Mission: Impossible – Fallout	August Walker		
2018	Night Hunter	Det. Walter Marshall		
2020	Enola Holmes	Sherlock Holmes		
2021	Zack Snyder's Justice League	Clark Kent / Superman		
2022	Black Adam	Clark Kent / Superman	Uncredited cameo; mid-credits scene	
2022	Enola Holmes 2	Sherlock Holmes		
2023	The Flash	Clark Kent / Superman	Uncredited cameo (Note: The actor's likeness was digitally recreated for a cameo appearance in The Flash using CGI. Cavill filmed additional scenes as the character for the film, but they were removed during post-production.)	
2024	Argylle	Agent Aubrey Argylle		
2024	The Ministry of Ungentlemanly Warfare	Gus March-Phillipps		
2024	Deadpool & Wolverine	Logan / Wolverine / "Cavillrine"	Cameo	
2026	In the Grey	Sid		
2026	Enola Holmes 3	Sherlock Holmes		
2027	Voltron †	King Alfor	Post-production	
2027	Highlander †	Connor MacLeod	Post-production	

=== Television ===
Year	Title	Role	Notes	Ref.
2002	The Inspector Lynley Mysteries	Chas Quilter	1 episode	
2002	Goodbye, Mr. Chips	Soldier Colley	Television film	
2003	Midsomer Murders	Simon Mayfield	Episode: "The Green Man"	
2007–2010	The Tudors	Charles Brandon	Main role, 38 episodes	
2019–2023	The Witcher	Geralt of Rivia	Main role, 24 episodes (seasons 1-3)	

=== Video games ===
Year	Title	Voice role	Ref.
TBA	Squadron 42 †	Ryan Enright	

== Awards and nominations ==
Award	Year	Category	Nominated work	Result	Ref.
Critics' Choice Movie Awards	2014	Best Actor in an Action Movie	Man of Steel	Nominated	
Critics' Choice Super Awards	2022	Best Actor in a Science Fiction/Fantasy Series	The Witcher	Nominated	
Golden Raspberry Awards	2017	Worst Actor	Batman v Superman: Dawn of Justice	Nominated	
Golden Raspberry Awards	2017	Worst Screen Combo (shared with Ben Affleck)	Batman v Superman: Dawn of Justice	Won	
HCA TV Awards	2022	Best Actor in a Streaming Series, Drama	The Witcher	Nominated	
Kids' Choice Awards	2017	Favorite Movie Actor	Batman v Superman: Dawn of Justice	Nominated	
Kids' Choice Awards	2017	Favorite Butt Kicker	Batman v Superman: Dawn of Justice	Nominated	
Kids' Choice Awards	2017	Favorite Frenemies (shared with Ben Affleck)	Batman v Superman: Dawn of Justice	Nominated	
MTV Movie Awards	2014	Best Hero	Man of Steel	Won	
NewNowNext Awards	2012	Cause You're Hot	The Tudors	Nominated	
NewNowNext Awards	2013	Cause You're Hot	Man of Steel	Nominated	
Saturn Awards	2021	Best Actor on Television	The Witcher	Nominated	
Teen Choice Awards	2013	Choice Summer Movie Star: Male	Man of Steel	Nominated	
Teen Choice Awards	2013	Choice Liplock (shared with Amy Adams)	Man of Steel	Nominated	
Teen Choice Awards	2016	Choice Movie Actor: Sci-Fi/Fantasy	Batman v Superman: Dawn of Justice	Nominated	
Teen Choice Awards	2016	Choice Liplock (shared with Amy Adams)	Batman v Superman: Dawn of Justice	Nominated	
Teen Choice Awards	2018	Choice Action Movie Actor	Justice League	Nominated	
