= Illya Kuryakin =

Fictional spy from The Man from U.N.C.L.E.

- The Man from U.N.C.L.E. character
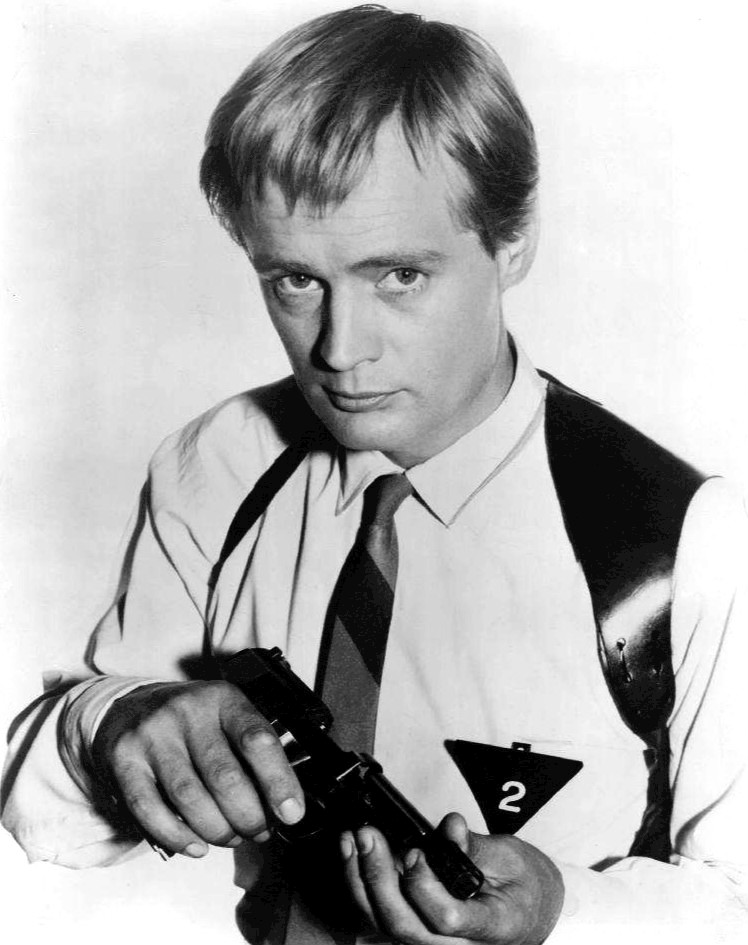
- David McCallum as Illya Kuryakin
- Portrayed by: David McCallum (television); Armie Hammer (film)

In-universe information
- Occupation: Secret agent
- Nationality: Soviet

Illya Nickovitch Kuryakin (Russian: Илья Курякин) is a fictional character from the 1960s TV spy series, The Man from U.N.C.L.E. He is a secret agent with a range of weapons and explosives skills, and is described in the series as holding a master's degree from the Sorbonne and a Ph.D. in Quantum Mechanics from the University of Cambridge ("The Her Master's Voice Affair"), and attended the University of Georgia in Ukraine, where he studied gymnastics among other things ("Hot Number"). Kuryakin speaks many languages, including French, Spanish ("The Very Important Zombie Affair"), German, Arabic, Italian and Japanese ("The Cherry Blossom Affair"). The series was remarkable for pairing an American character, Napoleon Solo, with the Russian Kuryakin as two spies who work together for an international espionage organization at the height of the Cold War.

== Background ==
Kuryakin was played by Scottish actor David McCallum. Although originally conceived as a minor character, Kuryakin became an indispensable part of the show, achieving co-star status with the show's lead, Napoleon Solo. McCallum's blond good looks and his portrayal of the character garnered him a following of female fans. While playing Kuryakin, McCallum received more fan mail than any other actor in the history of MGM.

Much of the character's appeal was based on what was ambiguous and enigmatic about him. When an acute reaction to penicillin hospitalized him in the early days of filming the series, McCallum took the opportunity to give serious thought to how he might flesh out what was, at that stage, a sketchy peripheral character. The approach he hit upon was to build a persona based on ambiguity and enigma, hiding, rather than revealing, aspects of the character's background and personality. McCallum summed up the character in commenting "No one knows what Illya Kuryakin does when he goes home at night."

Kuryakin is consistently referred to as Russian; however, he appears to have spent at least some of his childhood in Kyiv, Ukraine ("The Foxes and Hounds Affair"). In "The Neptune Affair" he appears in the uniform of the Soviet Navy and is recalled to the USSR to help deal with a crisis.

== After cancellation ==
The Man from U.N.C.L.E. was canceled mid-way through its fourth season in 1968. McCallum reprised the role of Kuryakin for a 1983 TV movie Return of the Man from U.N.C.L.E.: The Fifteen Years Later Affair. In 1986, The A-Team "The Say Uncle Affair" Robert Vaughn and McCallum reprise their roles as two former secret agent partners, only in this episode McCallum's character had been betrayed by another agent years before and left U.N.C.L.E.

Kuryakin has been the subject of several popular songs including Alma Cogan's Love Ya Illya (recorded under the pseudonym Angela and the Fans) and Ilya Kuryakin Looked at Me penned by The Cleaners from Venus. In 1968, Ike Bennet & The Crystalites recorded the instrumental rocksteady song "Illya Kurykin" released on Crystal Records and Island Records. The Argentine rap duo Illya Kuryaki and the Valderramas were named after him. Kuryakin also inspired the surname and character of Simon Illyan in Lois McMaster Bujold's Vorkosigan Saga science fiction series.

In an interview for a Man from U.N.C.L.E. retrospective television special, McCallum told of a visit to the White House during which, while he was being escorted to meet the President, a Secret Service agent told him "You're the reason I got this job."

== Mentions on other TV shows ==
In the TV show NCIS, David McCallum portrays a character named Dr. Donald "Ducky" Mallard. In NCIS season 2, episode 13 ("The Meat Puzzle"), Kate Todd asks Special Agent Gibbs, "What did Ducky look like when he was younger?" The answer given was "Illya Kuryakin".

A visual reference is made in NCIS Season 12, episode 3 ("So It Goes"), where in a flashback a younger Ducky, played by Adam Campbell, is shown with a hairstyle modeled after the way McCallum wore his hair whilst playing Kuryakin.

Also, on NCIS Season 20, Episode 21 ("Kompromat"), Ducky is on a video call from Scotland with the NCIS team. He is telling them about an old Soviet spy they are looking for—Ilya Sokolov— whom Ducky says has changed his name. When Ducky is trying to recall the name, he says, "Yeah, what was it? Something from an old television show. Kuryakin. Ivan Kuryakin."

== Film ==
Armie Hammer portrayed Kuryakin in The Man from U.N.C.L.E., a 2015 film adaptation of the TV series of the same name. This interpretation of the character, however, differs from that of the television series. Hammer portrays Kuryakin as short-tempered, violent and volatile (the end credits state he has "Volatile personality disorder") KGB assassin traumatized by the past of his parents, particularly his father, a top government official, who was caught stealing from Joseph Stalin's party funds and was exiled to the Gulag. Kuryakin was the youngest man to ever join the KGB Special Forces, becoming one of their best "within three years," which was a way to deal with the shame his family was left in.
