= Napoleon Solo =

Fictional spy from The Man from U.N.C.L.E.

- The Man from U.N.C.L.E. character
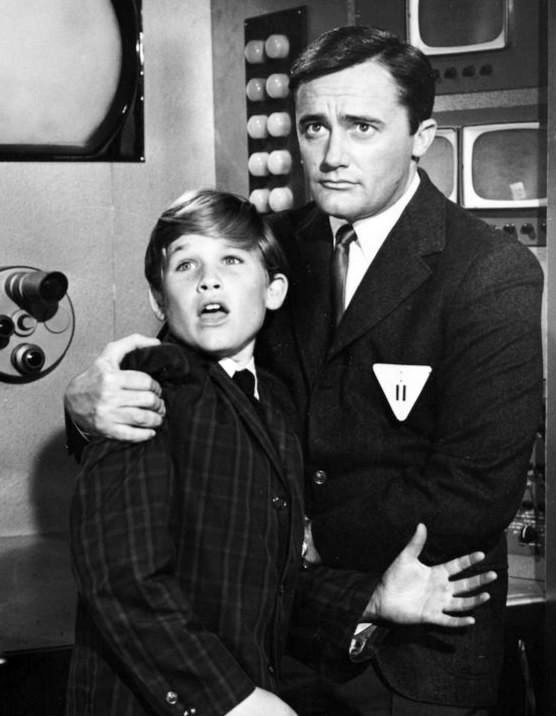
- Robert Vaughn as Napoleon Solo with a guest star, a young Kurt Russell
- Portrayed by: Robert Vaughn (television); Henry Cavill (film)

In-universe information
- Nickname: Solo
- Gender: Male
- Occupation: Secret Agent
- Nationality: American

Napoleon Solo is a fictional character from the 1960s TV spy series The Man from U.N.C.L.E. The series format was notable for pairing the American Solo, played by Robert Vaughn, and the Russian Illya Kuryakin, played by David McCallum, as two spies who work together for an international espionage organisation at the height of the Cold War.

== Background ==
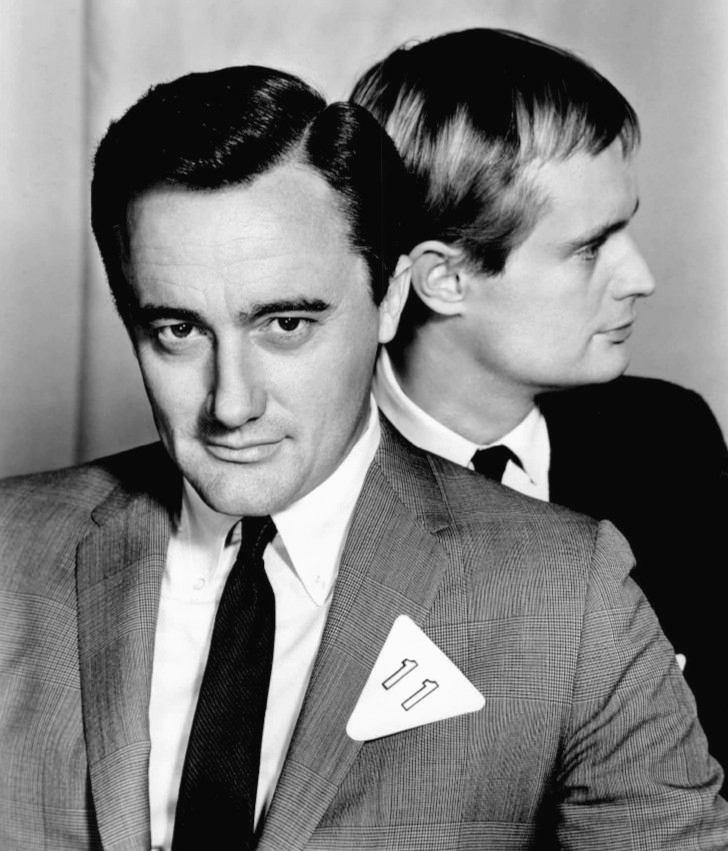
Napoleon Solo (left) and his partner Illya Kuryakin (David McCallum)

Solo possesses a charm, sophistication, efficiency, and weakness for beautiful women comparable to James Bond's. But Solo is considerably less intense and also less brutal than the British Secret Service agent, and he possesses a laid-back ease that recalls the young Cary Grant. The show's original concept had Solo as a Canadian; but he is consistently American in the show.

Solo is Number One in Section Two (Operations and Enforcement) at U.N.C.L.E. (In the first season he wore a badge with the Roman numeral II designating him as head of Section Two. During the switch to color in the second season, new badges were created and Robert Vaughn, mistaking the earlier II for an eleven, chose the wrong badge number for Solo.) It was originally intended that Solo would be the primary focus of the series, however the unexpected popularity of the Russian agent, Illya Kuryakin, played by David McCallum, saw McCallum elevated to co-star status. Most of the episodes devote equal screen time to Kuryakin and Solo, and much of the success of the program was based on the chemistry between McCallum and Vaughn.

== Personality ==
The two characters are, in many ways, polar opposites. Solo is urbane, self-assured, sociable, charming, and laid-back. Kuryakin, on the other hand, is reserved, intellectual, and intense. Although little was revealed about his background or his partner's, Solo comes across as the more accessible and straightforward of the two men.

He dressed well and had a taste for expensive suits and ties. His hairstyle and his clothing did not change in the first three seasons but in the fourth and final year, Vaughn (like McCallum) grew his hair somewhat longer and wore modish clothing, such as double-breasted suits, in order to reflect evolving 1960s fashions that the show itself had influenced.

In "The Secret Sceptre Affair", it is stated that Solo served in the Korean War. Nothing much is known about his immediate family, although it appears one of his grandfathers was an admiral, the other was an ambassador ("The Green Opal Affair"). He is college-educated. Like his partner Kuryakin, he has a wide knowledge of English poetry. Unlike his partner, he lacks a broad knowledge of science and technology. He is skilled in martial arts; he can fly a plane and a helicopter.

Like Bond, Solo is a serial womanizer. In the first season's press guide, Solo's democratic view of women is described in words paraphrased from the novel Animal Farm: "Solo believes that all women are created equal, only some are more equal than others." We rarely see him treat a woman with anything other than respect and affection on screen; however, he is involved with countless women and does not sustain a single long-term relationship throughout the four years of the show. Although it is never mentioned in the series, one of the original suggestions for Solo's background had him marrying young and losing his wife in a car accident after only one year of marriage (referenced also by David McDaniel in his "The Rainbow Affair" tie-in novel). The only ex-girlfriend of Solo's who is given any extended screen time is Clara in "The Terbuf Affair", in which it is hinted that Solo may be nursing a broken heart as a result of the end of that relationship. In "The Deadly Games Affair", it is revealed that he has a long-standing on-off relationship with the THRUSH femme fatale, Angelique. He also seems familiar with other THRUSH female operatives like Serena in "The Double Affair" and Narcissus in "The Project Deephole Affair", as well as various U.N.C.L.E. female agents like Wanda (played by actresses Leigh Chapman and Sharyn Hillyer). He sometimes takes an interest in other people's romantic affairs and plays matchmaker on more than one occasion. In "The Deep Six Affair", he objects to Mr. Waverly's trying to call off the wedding of another U.N.C.L.E. agent.

His charm and social skills are his most potent weapons, allowing him to manipulate almost every situation to his own advantage. He is keenly aware of his abilities in this area. When in "The Candidate's Wife Affair" Kuryakin sees him romancing a woman and asks in exasperation, "Don't you ever turn it off?" Solo responds, tongue in cheek, "When you've got it, you've got it; I've got it." But there is a certain idealism at the heart of his character. In "The Giuoco Piano Affair", an enemy operative offers this assessment of Solo's character –

For a man like you, if there's the smallest doubt in your mind, no matter how insignificant the cause, you have to make the ultimate sacrifice. Your respect for what you think is right is your weakness.

Solo is also an indefatigable optimist who rarely, if ever, countenances the idea that he might not succeed in everything he attempts. He also keeps a cool head at all times and is utterly unflappable, even in the most dire or life-threatening situations. Unlike his Russian associate, he rarely exhibits anger or loses his temper.

== Afterlife ==
The Man from U.N.C.L.E. was cancelled mid-way through its fourth season in 1968. Vaughn reprised the role of Solo for the television film Return of the Man from U.N.C.L.E.: The Fifteen Years Later Affair, in 1983.

The character has enjoyed a rich afterlife in fandom, particularly in fan fiction. In the 1988 comic Shattered Visage, made as a sequel to the Patrick McGoohan series The Prisoner, Solo and Kuryakin both make cameos at the funeral of a spy, along with John Steed and Emma Peel.

The Danish SKA band Napoleon Solo and Spanish indie-pop band Napoleon Solo are named after him, while El Paso post-hardcore band At the Drive-In have a song named "Napoleon Solo" on their album In/Casino/Out.

In the CBS television series NCIS, the character Dr. Donald "Ducky" Mallard (played by David McCallum) owned a Corgi dog named "Solo" (a reference to Napoleon Solo).

== Film ==
In The Man from U.N.C.L.E., a 2015 feature film, Henry Cavill portrays Napoleon Solo. This version of Solo is a former World War II soldier from an extremely wealthy family. He remained in Europe after the war, discovering that he could profit greatly from it as a specialist in classical art and architecture, becoming an unequalled art thief. He was eventually caught and prosecuted for his crimes and given a fifteen-year prison sentence. Solo doesn't spend any time in prison, however, as he is recruited by the CIA in exchange for his physical freedom.
