= Norman Felton =

British-American tv producer

Norman Francis Felton (April 29, 1913 – June 25, 2012) was a British-born American television producer, known for his involvement in shows such as The Man from U.N.C.L.E. and Dr. Kildare.

== Background ==
Felton was born in London, the son of John Felton, a lithographer, and Gertrude Anne Felton, a cleaning lady. He left school at 13 to go to work. In 1929, the family immigrated to the US, where they settled in Cleveland, Ohio. Felton left his job as a truck driver to attend the University of Iowa where he received a bachelor's degree in 1940 and a master's in 1941. In 1940, he married Aline Stotts and had three children: Julie Anne, born in 1948, John Christopher, born in 1953, and Aline Elizabeth, born in 1957. Aline, her husband David Berkley, and their nine-month-old daughter, Jessica, were murdered December 18, 1982 in Detroit near Wayne State Medical Center where David was a medical student. Three men were subsequently convicted of the triple-murders. Two were sentenced to life in prison, the third to 25-to-40 years in prison.

== Early career ==
Felton started out directing community theatre before becoming a producer-director of radio programs, such as Curtain Time for NBC in Chicago. In 1949, he directed the three-week run of These Are My Children for NBC, which is considered the first daily daytime soap opera. In 1950, he moved to New York to direct live television shows. In 1952 he won an Emmy award for Robert Montgomery Presents.

== The 1960s ==
The greatest successes of Felton's career came in the 1960s, when he produced and developed several classic television shows for Arena Productions including The Man from U.N.C.L.E. and Dr. Kildare.

It was Felton who approached James Bond creator Ian Fleming to collaborate in the development of U.N.C.L.E. When contractual obligations forced Fleming to pull out, Felton brought in Sam Rolfe to replace him. In 1965, he received a Golden Globe Award for The Man from U.N.C.L.E. and 1966 he received an Emmy Award nomination for the same show.

Felton made one cameo appearance in U.N.C.L.E., as a chess player in the party scene of the first-season episode, "The Giuoco Piano Affair".

At this time, he was also executive producer of the Wendell Corey/Jack Ging/Ralph Bellamy medical drama focusing on psychiatry, The Eleventh Hour, which aired on NBC from 1962 to 1964.

In 1969, he became executive producer on ITC Entertainment's UK-produced series Strange Report.

== Later career ==
In 1975, he produced the made-for-television film Babe (for which he received another Emmy nomination) and in 1979, And Your Name Is Jonah. He also produced Hawkins, a drama featuring James Stewart as a defense lawyer, and the prime-time soap, Executive Suite.

In 1997, he was awarded an Honorary Lifetime Membership of the Producers Guild of America. In 2013, Death Penalty Focus awarded Felton with their Human Rights Award.

He died of natural causes in Santa Barbara, California on June 25, 2012. Felton was survived by a son and daughter, two grandsons and a great-grandson.

== Norman Felton awards ==
Norman Felton lent his name to multiple awards:

- The Death Penalty Focus organization's Aline and Norman Felton Humanitarian Award
- Producers Guild of America's Norman Felton Producer of the Year Award
