= U.N.C.L.E. =

Fictional secret intelligence agency

U.N.C.L.E. is an acronym for the fictional United Network Command for Law and Enforcement, a secret international intelligence agency from the 1960s American television series The Man from U.N.C.L.E. and The Girl from U.N.C.L.E. The stars of the original series were Robert Vaughn (as Napoleon Solo), David McCallum (as Illya Kuryakin), and Leo G. Carroll (as Alexander Waverly). The series included 105 episodes from 1964 to its cancellation in 1968. In 2015, a movie adaptation of the same name was released.

Responsible for "maintaining political and legal order anywhere in the world," U.N.C.L.E. was characterized as multinational in its composition and international in scope, protecting and defending nations regardless of size or political persuasion. Within the series, U.N.C.L.E. operates in both communist and Third World countries, as well as in Western nations. In the episode entitled "The Shark Affair," an enforcement agent of U.N.C.L.E., Napoleon Solo, reveals that the fictional U.N.C.L.E. is sponsored by major nations such as the United States, the Soviet Union, and the United Kingdom. Its primary opponent is the independent international criminal organization THRUSH (Technological Hierarchy for the Removal of Undesirables and the Subjugation of Humanity).

== Fictional headquarters ==
U.N.C.L.E. headquarters are shown to be situated in New York City near the Lower East 40s. The headquarters has four levels, and the roof is equipped with radar, a laser beam weapon, a helipad, and disguised communication antennas. Below the sublevel is an underground docking area and a tunnel that runs under the United Nations headquarters, giving U.N.C.L.E.'s boats access to the East River.

The headquarters are depicted as a fortress hidden in the center of a block of buildings, with brownstone apartment buildings serving as the exterior façade. At one end of the block, a public parking garage with machine gun bays hidden in the ceiling is shown to be present, as well as a three-story Whitestone building at the other end. The first and second floors of the Whitestone are occupied by The Masque Club, a private, members-only "key club" in which the waitresses wear masks. On the third floor are the offices of U.N.C.L.E.'s front organization –a functioning charity.

There are four main entrances to the U.N.C.L.E. headquarters. In the daytime, field agents are admitted by way of Del Floria's, a small, undistinguished tailor and dry-cleaning shop located one flight below street level. The agents go to the single fitting booth and turn the coat hook on the back wall. Outside the shop, an operator activates a mechanism on the pressing machine that releases the disguised armored door. The wall swings inward, and the agents find themselves in the main admissions area. There, a receptionist pins on a security badge (white or later, yellow for highest security clearance; red and green for low clearance and visitors). A chemical on the receptionist's fingers activates the badge. There are also entrances through the men's and women's lockers at the rear of the parking garage (intended for non-field personnel). After hours, when Del Floria's is closed, agents may also enter through the Masque Club or the offices of the charitable organization.

Although in theory the location of U.N.C.L.E.'s New York headquarters is supposed to be secret, the very first episode of the series, "The Vulcan Affair," demonstrates that it is a poorly kept secret at best, as the teaser of the episode shows THRUSH operatives infiltrating U.N.C.L.E. headquarters through Del Floria's entrance in an attempt to mount an armed assault and kill U.N.C.L.E.'s Section One Number –Mr. Waverly. Other episodes showing THRUSH's knowledge of the location of U.N.C.L.E. headquarters include "The Deadly Games Affair", "The Deadly Decoy Affair", and "The Mad, Mad Tea Party Affair" (all first-season episodes). In "The Deadly Decoy Affair," the Del Floria entrance is even used for egress during a high-profile prisoner transfer during daylight hours. Although, as noted in "The Double Affair" and other episodes, THRUSH has a very effective intelligence service and has also, as demonstrated in "The Mad, Mad Tea Party Affair", successfully corrupted U.N.C.L.E. personnel, or infiltrated their own as moles.

The New York office is one of several located around the world. Some also use the Del Floria tailor shop as a front as seen, for example, with U.N.C.L.E.'s Italian headquarters in "The King of Knaves Affair".

== Fictional logo ==
The official logo of the organization within the series is a black Nicolosi globular projection with select lines of longitude and latitude picked out in white. Black concentric rings surround the globe; to the right of it is the black silhouette of a man in a black suit holding a gun at his side, and a black band beneath the globe and the man features the name "U.N.C.L.E." in the "Decorated 035" font. The logo is normally superimposed on a Mercator-style map of the world with yellow-brown continents sans national borders (a node to the one-world philosophy of U.N.C.L.E.) and blue seas, but is also used plain or with tones inverted on official U.N.C.L.E. documents.

== Origins ==
According to The Cloak and Swagger Affair, a documentary about the making of the fictional series included with the 2007 DVD release, the producers of The Man from U.N.C.L.E. originally intended to leave the meaning of the U.N.C.L.E. acronym a mystery. The meaning of THRUSH was never revealed in the series –although the 4th book in The Man from U.N.C.L.E. paperback series, "The Dagger Affair," postulated that THRUSH stood for the "Technological Hierarchy for the Removal of Undesirables and the Subjugation of Humanity". The documentary states that after a protest from the United Nations, which did not want to be connected to a fictional organization (such as, the sake of argument, the "United Nations Criminal Law Enforcement"), the writers came up with a meaning that also became part of the series' trademark closing credit, thanking the United Network Command for Law and Enforcement for its cooperation with the producers of The Man from U.N.C.L.E. Other sources credit producer Sam Rolfe as originally intending that U.N.C.L.E. be identified as an arm of the United Nations ("Behind that door is a man who reports only to the Secretariat of the United Nations!" was supposedly a part of his network pitch). As noted above, this idea was discarded for reasons still debated.
