= List of The Man from U.N.C.L.E. episodes =

The Man from U.N.C.L.E. is an American television series that ran for three and a half seasons on NBC, from September 22, 1964 to January 15, 1968. It was canceled midway through its fourth season. A total of 105 episodes were produced, each with a 50-minute running time. Season One was filmed entirely in black-and-white, except for the pilot episode, "The Vulcan Affair," and "The Double Affair", which were filmed in color since they were planned to be turned into feature films.

Additional scenes were filmed later, in the case of "Vulcan," and in the case of "Double," concurrently. (The portions of "The 4 Steps Affair" which included the expanded scenes from both feature films had been filmed in color even though all Season One episodes were broadcast in black-and-white.) All subsequent seasons were broadcast in color. Eight feature-length motion pictures were released based on single or double episodes of the show. All 105 episodes were released on DVD in 2007.

== Series overview ==
Season	Episodes	Originally released	
Season	Episodes	First released	Last released
1	29	September 22, 1964	April 19, 1965
2	30	September 17, 1965	April 15, 1966
3	30	September 16, 1966	April 14, 1967
4	16	September 11, 1967	January 15, 1968
Television film		April 5, 1983	

== Episodes ==
=== Season 1 (1964–65) ===
No. overall	No. in season	Title	Directed by	Written by	Original release date
1	1	"The Vulcan Affair"	Don Medford	Sam Rolfe	September 22, 1964
THRUSH are thwarted in their attempt to assassinate U.N.C.L.E. chief Alexander Waverly. Napoleon Solo is assigned to protect a visiting African leader (William Marshall) whose life is under threat from Andrew Vulcan (Fritz Weaver). A housewife (Patricia Crowley) is recruited to help him. This episode (filmed in color) was later expanded and released to cinemas as To Trap a Spy by incorporating footage shot with Luciana Paluzzi that was reused in The Four Steps Affair.
2	2	"The Iowa-Scuba Affair"	Richard Donner	Harold Jack Bloom	September 29, 1964
Solo is sent to Iowa to investigate the mysterious demise of an air force man. With the assistance of Jill Denison (Katherine Crawford) he uncovers a plan to steal a space plane. (David McCallum only appears in the teaser of this episode.)
3	3	"The Quadripartite Affair"	Richard Donner	Alan Caillou	October 6, 1964
Napoleon Solo and Illya Kuryakin must stop Gervaise Ravel (Anne Francis) from using a gas that induces a state of fear and anxiety to create political havoc. Jill Ireland guest-stars as Marion Raven.
4	4	"The Shark Affair"	Marc Daniels	Alvin Sapinsley	October 13, 1964
While investigating a series of kidnappings, Solo and Illya encounter Captain Shark (Robert Culp) who is creating a modern-day Noah's Ark with the intention of repopulating the world in the event of a nuclear holocaust. Co-starring Sue Ane Langdon, Herbert Anderson, James Doohan and Meg Wyllie.
5	5	"The Deadly Games Affair"	Alvin Ganzer	Dick Nelson	October 20, 1964
A former SS scientist (Alexander Scourby) is attempting to reanimate the body of Hitler (though not mentioned by name). Co-starring Janine Gray as THRUSH villainess Angelique, with whom Solo has a complex, romantic relationship.
6	6	"The Green Opal Affair"	John Peyser	Robert E. Thompson	October 27, 1964
Solo attempts to rescue a group of people kidnapped and brainwashed by THRUSH. Stars Carroll O'Connor, Joan O'Brien, Nachi Nozawa and Milton Selzer.
7	7	"The Giuoco Piano Affair"	Richard Donner	Alan Caillou	November 10, 1964
Taking its title from the classic chess opening, this episode is a sequel to The Quadripartite Affair. Since Gervaise Ravel (Anne Francis) had evaded capture in the earlier episode, Solo and Illya devise a scheme to lure her into a trap. Jill Ireland (Marion Raven) and John Van Dreelen (Harold Bufferton) also return. Director Richard Donner, producer Sam Rolfe, associate producer Joseph Calvelli and executive producer Norman Felton have cameos during a party scene.
8	8	"The Double Affair"	John Newland	Clyde Ware	November 17, 1964
Later expanded (by incorporating footage from the episode The Four Steps Affair) and released in cinemas as the feature film The Spy with My Face, this episode (filmed in color) sees THRUSH create a double for Solo and substitute him for the real agent. Features Senta Berger, Sharon Farrell, and Harold Gould as a doctor. (The Spy With My Face writing credits: "Screenplay by Joseph Calvelli and Clyde Ware. Story by Clyde Ware.")
9	9	"The Project Strigas Affair"	Joseph Sargent	Henry Misrock	November 24, 1964
Solo and Illya devise a scheme to discredit a Balkan diplomat. Illya goes undercover as an operative from the diplomat’s home country who has been sent to investigate the fictional ’Project Strigas’. This episode is considered a Star Trek "preunion" as it features William Shatner and Leonard Nimoy shortly before they became the stars of Star Trek. Peggy Ann Garner, Sheila MacRae and Werner Klemperer guest-star.
10	10	"The Finny Foot Affair"	Marc Daniels	Story by : Jay Simms; Teleplay by : Jack Turley & Jay Simms	December 1, 1964
Solo investigates a chemical which has wiped out an entire Scottish village. A young Kurt Russell guest-stars as does Tura Satana (Faster, Pussycat! Kill! Kill!).
11	11	"The Neptune Affair"	Vincent McEveety	Story by : John W. Bloch; Teleplay by : Henry Sharp & John W. Bloch	December 8, 1964
Illya Kuryakin is recalled to the USSR when it emerges that rockets carrying a fungus are endangering the Russian wheat harvest. Solo travels to southern California independently to infiltrate the launching base (an oil platform) and avert a war between the USSR and the US. Starring Henry Jones, John Banner and Marta Kristen. May Heatherly plays Heather McNabb, the U.N.C.L.E. secretary.
12	12	"The Dove Affair"	John Peyser	Robert Towne	December 15, 1964
Solo attempts to smuggle a microdot containing top secret information about THRUSH out of a small Eastern European country. Ricardo Montalbán and June Lockhart guest-star, with an uncredited Victor Buono and Dan Seymour. (David McCallum does not appear in this episode.)
13	13	"The King of Knaves Affair"	Michael O'Herlihy	Ellis Marcus	December 22, 1964
Solo poses as an arms dealer in an attempt to scupper the plans of a deposed ruler (Paul Stevens) who is hoping to return to power by building an army of high-profile criminals. (Leo G. Carroll does not appear in this episode.)
14	14	"The Terbuf Affair"	Richard Donner	Alan Caillou	December 29, 1964
When an old flame (Madlyn Rhue) asks Solo to help gypsy leader Emil (Jacques Aubuchon) escape from the Balkan territory of Terbuf, he and Illya uncover a trail of corruption leading to the country's head of police (played by scriptwriter Alan Caillou). (Leo G. Carroll does not appear in this episode.)
15	15	"The Deadly Decoy Affair"	Alvin Ganzer	Albert Aley	January 11, 1965
Solo and Illya must play an elaborate game of subterfuge in order to transport a high-ranking THRUSH official to Washington and evade all attempts to rescue him. Matters are complicated when a secretary on her lunch hour gets handcuffed to the prisoner and must come along. With Ralph Taeger, Joanna Moore and Berry Kroeger. Look for Jason Wingreen. (First episode to air in its new Monday night slot.)
16	16	"The Fiddlesticks Affair"	Theodore J. Flicker	Story by : Aben Kandel; Teleplay by : Peter A. Fields	January 18, 1965
Solo and Illya devise a scheme to break into a vault under a casino where THRUSH keep their funds. Stars Dan O'Herlihy, Marlyn Mason and Ken Murray. (Leo G. Carroll does not appear in this episode.)
17	17	"The Yellow Scarf Affair"	Ron Winston	Story by : Robert Yale Libott; Teleplay by : Robert Yale Libott & Boris Ingster	January 25, 1965
When an U.N.C.L.E. agent dies in a plane crash, Solo travels to India to investigate. He discovers that the crash was no accident and finds himself involved in a race to recover a vital piece of technology. Starring Linden Chiles, Kamala Devi and Murray Matheson. (David McCallum does not appear in this episode.)
18	18	"The Mad, Mad Tea Party Affair"	Seymour Robbie	Dick Nelson	February 1, 1965
A mysterious man (Richard Haydn) appears to be able to circumvent the security system in U.N.C.L.E. headquarters at will. While attempting to capture him, Solo and Illya discover a THRUSH agent inside U.N.C.L.E. who intends to kill several high-ranking officials at a conference later that day. Co-starring Zohra Lampert, Peter Haskell and Lee Meriwether.
19	19	"The Secret Sceptre Affair"	Marc Daniels	Anthony Spinner	February 8, 1965
Solo and Illya attempt to recover a national treasure from a dictator at the instigation of Solo’s old commanding officer Major Morgan (Gene Raymond). But are Morgan’s motives as pure as they seem? Features an uncredited William Boyett (Adam-12) as a pilot. (Leo G. Carroll does not appear in this episode.)
20	20	"The Bow Wow Affair"	Sherman Marks	Alan Caillou	February 15, 1965
When Waverly's cousin (Leo G. Carroll in a dual role) is killed by his own dog, Illya is sent to investigate. Starring Susan Oliver and Pat Harrington Jr.
21	21	"The Four Steps Affair"	Alvin Ganzer	Story by : Joseph Calvelli; Teleplay by : Peter A. Fields	February 22, 1965
Solo and Illya agree to protect a young Tibetan religious leader from a kidnapping attempt by THRUSH. Starring Luciana Paluzzi, Malachi Throne and Donald Harron. (This episode was designed to use the footage shot to turn The Vulcan Affair and The Double Affair into their feature versions.)
22	22	"The See Paris and Die Affair"	Alf Kjellin	Story by : Sheldon Stark; Teleplay by : Peter A. Fields & Sheldon Stark	March 1, 1965
Solo and Illya take on two cousins (Lloyd Bochner and Gerald Mohr) who are attempting to control the diamond market, and simultaneously attempt to thwart THRUSH attempts to steal the diamonds. Look for famous drummer Earl Palmer as a member of "The Gallants." (Leo G. Carroll does not appear in this episode.)
23	23	"The Brain-Killer Affair"	James Goldstone	Archie Tegland	March 8, 1965
Waverly is subjected to the effects of a brain-altering device by THRUSH. Solo and Illya must save Waverly and find the device. Elsa Lanchester, Abraham Sofaer and Yvonne Craig guest-star.
24	24	"The Hong Kong Shilling Affair"	Alvin Ganzer	Alan Caillou	March 15, 1965
At a black market auction in Hong Kong, Solo and Illya attempt to recover a coin in which there is a microdot containing military secrets. Glenn Corbett, Gavin MacLeod, and Richard Kiel guest-star.
25	25	"The Never-Never Affair"	Joseph Sargent	Dean Hargrove	March 22, 1965
Solo sends a bored U.N.C.L.E. translator (Barbara Feldon, not long before she "transferred" from U.N.C.L.E. to CONTROL) on a hoax mission in an attempt to liven up her life. When it emerges that he has inadvertently given her a microfilm for which THRUSH is searching, he and Illya must track her down and save her from THRUSH. Cesar Romero guest-stars.
26	26	"The Love Affair"	Marc Daniels	Albert Aley	March 29, 1965
Brother Love (Eddie Albert), a THRUSH leader posing as an evangelist, is constructing a nuclear spaceship. Solo must rescue a scientist and a student, both kidnapped by Brother Love, and foil his plan.
27	27	"The Gazebo in the Maze Affair"	Alf Kjellin	Story by : Antony Ellis; Teleplay by : Dean Hargrove & Antony Ellis	April 5, 1965
Seeking revenge for a previous encounter, G. Emory Partridge (George Sanders) abducts Illya and uses him as bait to snare Solo. Also stars Jeanette Nolan and Bonnie Franklin. This episode is remarkable for its depictions of bondage and torture in an underground dungeon when such things were generally not acceptable, but it is played with humor and satire.
28	28	"The Girls of Nazarone Affair"	Alvin Ganzer	Story by : Peter Barry; Teleplay by : Peter A. Fields	April 12, 1965
Solo and Illya travel to Southern France to investigate a serum which supposedly gives supernatural strength and revives the dead. Starring Kipp Hamilton and Marian McCargo. (Leo G. Carroll does not appear in this episode.)
29	29	"The Odd Man Affair"	Joseph Sargent	Dick Nelson	April 19, 1965
When a retired U.N.C.L.E. agent (Martin Balsam) is recruited to impersonate a crime lord, he decides to take the mission into his own hands. Solo and Illya must protect him as he infiltrates a crime conference.

=== Season 2 (1965–66) ===
All episodes now filmed in color

No. overall	No. in season	Title	Directed by	Written by	Original release date
30	1	"Alexander the Greater Affair"	Joseph Sargent	Dean Hargrove	September 17, 1965
31	2	"Alexander the Greater Affair"	Joseph Sargent	Dean Hargrove	September 24, 1965
Megalomaniac businessman Alexander (Rip Torn) plans to imitate his namesake Alexander the Great by taking over the world. Solo and Illya must stop him before he manages to succeed in his meticulously planned scheme. Dorothy Provine co-stars as Alexander’s ex-wife. (This two-parter is the only story of the series to lack the definite article in the on-screen title and was later released in cinemas as the feature film One Spy Too Many.)
32	3	"The Ultimate Computer Affair"	Joseph Sargent	Peter Allan Fields	October 1, 1965
THRUSH have developed a computer capable of recording all the organisations operations. Illya must go undercover in a penal colony to find and destroy the machine, then Solo must pose as a prisons inspector to get Illya out.
33	4	"The Foxes and Hounds Affair"	Alf Kjellin	Story by : Eric Bercovici; Teleplay by : Peter Allan Fields	October 8, 1965
U.N.C.L.E. find themselves in a race against THRUSH to obtain a newly developed mind-reading device. Vincent Price guest-stars as Victor Marton.
34	5	"The Discotheque Affair"	Tom Gries	Story by : Leonard Stadd; Teleplay by : Dean Hargrove	October 15, 1965
THRUSH plant a listening device in an apartment next to Waverly's office and Solo investigates. Meanwhile Illya infiltrates the discotheque, run by THRUSH where their records are kept. Features guest stars Ray Danton, Judi West and Evelyn Ward.
35	6	"The Re-Collectors Affair"	Alvin Ganzer	Alan Caillou	October 22, 1965
Solo and Illya are on the trail of the Recollectors, a group that hunts down and kills former Nazis in order to steal their looted art collections and profit by selling them back to the original owners.
36	7	"The Arabian Affair"	E. Darrell Hallenbeck	Peter Allan Fields	October 29, 1965
While investigating a THRUSH installation in the Arabian desert Illya is captured by a local tribe. In New York Solo enlists the help of a THRUSH agent whose bosses intend to eliminate him on his retirement and travels to Arabia to complete the mission.
37	8	"The Tigers are Coming Affair"	Herschel Daugherty	Story by : "Paul Tuckahoe"; Teleplay by : Alan Caillou	November 5, 1965
Solo and Illya travel to India to help a French botanist discover why the jungle is dying and its inhabitants are vanishing. Jill Ireland and scriptwriter Alan Caillou guest-star. (The following season Caillou would appear in The Girl from U.N.C.L.E.'s "The Jewels of Topango Affair" and "The Phi Beta Killer Affair," neither of which he wrote.)
38	9	"The Deadly Toys Affair"	John Brahm	Robert Hill	November 12, 1965
THRUSH is attempting to enlist a boy genius. Solo and Illya go undercover to try and protect him. Angela Lansbury guest-stars as the boy’s eccentric aunt.
39	10	"The Cherry Blossom Affair"	Joseph Sargent	Story by : Sherman Yellen; Teleplay by : Mark Weingart	November 19, 1965
When THRUSH agents in Japan acquire a volcano-activating device Solo and Illya enlist the help of a local student to help them find it before it is too late.
40	11	"The Virtue Affair"	Jud Taylor	Henry Slesar	December 3, 1965
A fanatic is attempting to destroy the vineyards of France as part of his crusade against drunkenness. Illya goes undercover at the villain’s chateau, while Solo enlists the help of a scientist and his daughter. When Illya’s cover is blown, Solo must rescue him and foil the plot.
41	12	"The Children’s Day Affair"	Sherman Marks	Dean Hargrove	December 10, 1965
An U.N.C.L.E. international security conference in Switzerland is threatened when it emerges that a nearby school for boys is a front for THRUSH.
42	13	"The Adriatic Express Affair"	Seymour Robbie	Robert Hill	December 17, 1965
On New Year’s Eve Solo and Illya board the train to Venice in an attempt to intercept a THRUSH agent who has developed a virus that could wipe out the human race.
43	14	"The Yukon Affair"	Alf Kjellin	Marc Siegel	December 24, 1965
G. Emory Partridge (George Sanders) returns with a plot to disrupt world communications. Solo and Illya travel to Alaska, in an attempt to neutralise him once and for all.
44	15	"The Very Important Zombie Affair"	David Alexander	Boris Ingster	December 31, 1965
When a local despot (Claude Akins) places a prominent doctor under a voodoo curse, Solo and Illya travel to the Caribbean to investigate.
45	16	"The Dippy Blonde Affair"	E. Darrell Hallenbeck	Peter Allan Fields	January 7, 1966
Solo enlists the help of a THRUSH agent’s girlfriend (Joyce Jameson) in order to obtain an ion projection machine from the international criminal ring.
46	17	"The Deadly Goddess Affair"	Seymour Robbie	Robert Hill	January 14, 1966
U.N.C.L.E.’s two top agents travel to Circe in an attempt to intercept a drone plane carrying significant THRUSH funds.
47	18	"The Birds and the Bees Affair"	Alvin Ganzer	Mark Weingart	January 21, 1966
THRUSH has developed a strain of tiny but deadly bees and plans to release them in U.N.C.L.E. headquarters. They capture Illya and torture him in an attempt to make him lead them to U.N.C.L.E.’s base.
48	19	"The Waverly Ring Affair"	John Brahm	Jerry McNeely	January 28, 1966
Following a security leak, Waverly assigns Solo and Illya to root out a double agent in U.N.C.L.E.
49	20	"The Bridge of Lions Affair"	E. Darrell Hallenbeck	Story by : Henry Slesar; Teleplay by : Howard Rodman	February 4, 1966
50	21	"The Bridge of Lions Affair"	E. Darrell Hallenbeck	Story by : Henry Slesar; Teleplay by : Howard Rodman	February 11, 1966
A trail of missing cats leads Solo and Illya to a salon which is developing a rejuvenation process. (This is the only "Affair" to be based on previously published material; Slesar receives story credit due to it being based on his novel The Bridge of Lions. This two-parter was released in cinemas as the feature film One of Our Spies is Missing; this was the final U.N.C.L.E. movie to be released theatrically in North America.)
51	22	"The Foreign Legion Affair"	John Brahm	Berne Giler	February 18, 1966
While returning from a mission with valuable THRUSH documents, Illya is forced to bail out of a plane. He lands in the desert at an abandoned Foreign Legion base. Solo must find him and recover the documents before THRUSH does. Danielle De Metz guest-stars.
52	23	"The Moonglow Affair"	Joseph Sargent	Dean Hargrove	February 25, 1966
When Solo and Illya are incapacitated, Waverly assigns agent April Dancer (Mary Ann Mobley) and Mark Slate (Norman Fell) to complete their mission. This was the pilot episode for the short-lived, spin-off series The Girl from U.N.C.L.E..
53	24	"The Nowhere Affair"	Michael Ritchie	Robert Hill	March 4, 1966
While on assignment in Nevada, Solo is captured and swallows an amnesia pill. THRUSH attempts to stimulate his memory while Illya, with the help of an old prospector (J. Pat O'Malley), races to find him before his memory returns.
54	25	"The King of Diamonds Affair"	Joseph Sargent	Story by : Ed Blum; Teleplay by : Ed Blum and Leo Townsend	March 11, 1966
Solo and Illya enlist the help of a diamond thief (Ricardo Montalbán) in their attempt to foil a criminal group who are destabilising the world diamond market.
55	26	"The Project Deephole Affair"	Alex March	Dean Hargrove	March 18, 1966
In an attempt to secure an earthquake-activating machine THRUSH mistakenly kidnaps a salesman (Jack Weston). Solo and Illya are assigned to protect the salesman and recover the machine. Guest stars Barbara Bouchet and Leon Askin.
56	27	"The Round Table Affair"	E. Darrell Hallenbeck	Story by : Henry Slesar; Teleplay by : Robert Hill	March 25, 1966
Solo and Illya attempt to foil an international group of criminals who have taken over the tiny principality of Ingolstein, because it has no extradition treaty.
57	28	"The Bat Cave Affair"	Alf Kjellin	Jerry McNeely	April 1, 1966
A THRUSH agent (Martin Landau) plans to use radioactive bats to jam the world's radar systems. Solo and Illya must stop him before it is too late.
58	29	"The Minus-X Affair"	E. Darrell Hallenbeck	Peter Allan Fields	April 8, 1966
Solo and Illya are assigned to protect a scientist (Eve Arden) who has developed a drug which heightens all the human senses. THRUSH plan to use the effects of the drug to help their agents launch an attack on a plutonium plant.
59	30	"The Indian Affairs Affair"	Alf Kjellin	Dean Hargrove	April 15, 1966
THRUSH is using an American Indian reservation as a front to assemble a hydrogen bomb and have kidnapped the tribe's chief. Solo and Illya are assigned to the case.

=== Season 3 (1966–67) ===
No. overall	No. in season	Title	Directed by	Written by	Original release date
60	1	"The Her Master's Voice Affair"	Barry Shear	Berne Giler	September 16, 1966
Solo investigates a girls' school for the daughters of VIPs, including Miki Matsu (Victoria Young), who has valuable secret information from her father, a Japanese diplomat. Estelle Winwood guest-stars as the school's headmistress.
61	2	"The Sort of Do-It-Yourself Dreadful Affair"	E. Darrell Hallenbeck	Harlan Ellison	September 23, 1966
Solo is nearly killed by a superhuman, robot-like girl, one of an army of such devices invented by Dr. Pertwee (Woodrow Parfrey) for THRUSH. Illya joins up with Margo's ex-roommate, Andy Francis (Jeannine Riley). Solo poses as a banker financing the THRUSH lab and finds the laboratory, where a roomful of robots attack the U.N.C.L.E. agents.
62	3	"The Galatea Affair"	E. Darrell Hallenbeck	Jackson Gillis	September 30, 1966
While Solo is recuperating from a fall into a Venice canal, Illya teams with Mark Slate to uncover Baroness Bibi de Chasseur (Joan Collins), a THRUSH money courier who has contact with the treasurer of THRUSH. This was one of two episodes crossing over between the parent show and The Girl from U.N.C.L.E. (the other was "The Mother Muffin Affair" on the spinoff); Collins plays two roles.
63	4	"The Super-Colossal Affair"	Barry Shear	Stanford Sherman	October 7, 1966
Frank Cariago (Bernard Fein), the U.S. head of a crime syndicate, is under pressure from Uncle Giuliano (J. Carrol Naish). Cariago decides to buy a movie production directed by Sheldon Veblan (Shelley Berman) so his girlfriend, Ginger Laveer (Carol Wayne) can have the starring role. But the picture is a disguised plan to drop a bomb on the family's biggest rival – Las Vegas. (One of the few episodes in which THRUSH is not the villain.)
64	5	"The Monks of St. Thomas Affair"	Alex March	Sheldon Stark	October 14, 1966
THRUSH agent Abbot Simon (David J. Stewart) takes over the monastery at St. Thomas to use the mountain location to aim a new laser gun at a long-distance target the Louvre in Paris. Solo visits the area and meets Andrea Fouchet (Celeste Yarnall), and together they try to stop Simon before he destroys the world's greatest art treasures.
65	6	"The Pop Art Affair"	George Waggner	John Herman Shaner, Al Ramrus	October 21, 1966
A dissatisfied beatnik and THRUSH collaborator tips U.N.C.L.E. off to a new deadly hiccup gas. A pendant he wears leads Illya to Greenwich Village and an art gallery run by Mark Ole (Robert H. Harris), a THRUSH agent. (Includes Illya's beat poet performance of "Is This Your Ape?")
66	7	"The Thor Affair"	Sherman Marks	Don Richman, Stanley Ralph Ross	October 28, 1966
Solo and Illya are assigned to protect Dr. Fazie Nahdi (Harry Davis), a Gandhi-like peace advocate, during a conference.
67	8	"The Candidate's Wife Affair"	George Waggner	Robert Hill	November 4, 1966
Solo and Illya protect Miranda Bryant (Diana Hyland), the wife of a presidential candidate (Richard Anderson), from a plot to kidnap her, not realizing that she has already been kidnapped and replaced with a double, Irina, also played by Hyland. (One of the few episodes where THRUSH was not involved.)
68	9	"The Come with Me to the Casbah Affair"	E. Darrell Hallenbeck	Story by : Danielle Branton & Norman Lenzer and Robert Hill; Teleplay by : Robert Hill	November 11, 1966
Solo and Illya go to Algiers to obtain a rare old book containing a THRUSH code from Pierrot La Mouche (Pat Harrington Jr.) who has stolen it from his boss, Colonel Hamid (Jacques Aubuchon).
69	10	"The Off-Broadway Affair"	Sherman Marks	Jerry McNeely	November 18, 1966
An off-broadway actress is murdered during a phone call to U.N.C.L.E., and Solo and Illya investigate a connection between the show and a sudden malfunction in U.N.C.L.E.'s communications. The understudy, Janet Jarrod (Shari Lewis), takes over the lead role, and Illya joins the cast to find the jamming device.
70	11	"The Concrete Overcoat Affair" – Part 1	Joseph Sargent	Story by : David Victor; Teleplay by : Peter Allan Fields	November 25, 1966
While in Italy investigating a THRUSH plan to divert the Gulf Stream with heavy water, Solo finds himself eluding THRUSH guards, and ends up hiding under the bed of Pia Monteri (Letícia Román). Jack Palance and Janet Leigh guest-star.
71	12	"The Concrete Overcoat Affair" – Part 2	Joseph Sargent	Story by : David Victor; Teleplay by : Peter Allan Fields	December 2, 1966
See Part 1, above. This two-parter was later released theatrically as The Spy in the Green Hat.
72	13	"The Abominable Snowman Affair"	Otto Lang	Krishna Shah	December 9, 1966
Illya goes to the Himalayan country of Ghupat to protect the high lama, but is shot by "Calamity" Rogers (Anne Jeffreys), an American rodeo star. Solo is sent to find Illya, and learns that the prime minister (David Sheiner) has kidnapped the real successor to the throne and intends to install his own son instead.
73	14	"The My Friend the Gorilla Affair"	Alex Singer	Story by : Joseph Sandy; Teleplay by : Don Richman	December 16, 1966
In Africa, Professor Kenton (Arthur Malet) has developed a superman formula which he has been using on the natives, hoping to build an army with which to conquer all of Africa. Percy Rodriguez appears as President Khufu.
74	15	"The Jingle Bells Affair"	John Brahm	William Fay	December 23, 1966
In the show's only Christmas-themed episode, Solo and Illya protect Premier Georgi Koz (Akim Tamiroff), a Khrushchev-like figure come to address the United Nations. To learn about capitalism, the communist leader dresses as Santa Claus, then is mistaken by a dying boy for the real thing.
75	16	"The Take Me to Your Leader Affair"	George Waggner	Berne Giler	December 30, 1966
Scientist Adrian Cool (Woodrow Parfrey) spots a UFO approaching Earth on his radar. His daughter Coco (Nancy Sinatra) is kidnapped, and Illya follows and is captured too.
76	17	"The Suburbia Affair"	Charles Haas	Story by : Sheridan Gibney; Teleplay by : Sheridan Gibney and Stanford Sherman	January 6, 1967
Dr. Rutter (Victor Borge), after inventing antimatter, hides out in suburbia under the name Willoughby because he fears his creation will be used destructively. Solo and Illya take a house there to find him. Reta Shaw plays the villainess, Miss Witherspoon.
77	18	"The Deadly Smorgasbord Affair"	Barry Shear	Story by : Peter Bourne and Stanley Ralph Ross; Teleplay by : Stanley Ralph Ross	January 13, 1967
Solo goes to Sweden to obtain a new suspended animation device from Dr. A.C. Nilson (Peter Brocco), but the device and its inventor are taken by THRUSH. (David McCallum does not appear in this episode.)
78	19	"The Yo-Ho-Ho and a Bottle of Rum Affair"	E. Darrell Hallenbeck	Norman Hudis	January 20, 1967
Investigating the shipment of a tidal-wave machine by THRUSH, Illya ends up aboard a merchant vessel run by Captain Morton (Dan O'Herlihy). Morton is obsessed with his past disgrace in a court martial, and the crew is on the verge of a mutiny, which Illya leads just as THRUSH arrives to take possession of the device.
79	20	"The Napoleon's Tomb Affair"	John Brahm	James N. Whiton	January 27, 1967
President Nasasos Tunik (Kurt Kasznar) visits Paris. His assistant, Malanez (Joseph Sirola), is determined to persuade the president that the French are his enemy, and arranges for various embarrassing and insulting incidents to occur. Ted Cassidy appears as Edgar the henchman.
80	21	"The It's All Greek to Me Affair"	George Waggner	Story by : Robert Hill and Eric Faust; Teleplay by : Robert Hill	February 3, 1967
In Greece, Illya tries to recover stolen U.N.C.L.E. documents, but they fall into the hands of Stavros (Harold J. Stone), a Greek bandit, who has ambushed Illya, thinking he is his daughter (Linda Marsh) Kira's convict husband, Manolakas (George Keymas) returning from prison.
81	22	"The Hula Doll Affair"	Eddie Saeta	Stanford Sherman	February 17, 1967
Blood siblings Simon and Peter Sweet (Jan Murray and Pat Harrington Jr.), rival THRUSH leaders vying for promotion, do not realize that the toy hula doll they possess has an extremely powerful new U.N.C.L.E. explosive inside that is activated by heat.
82	23	"The Pieces of Fate Affair"	John Brahm	Story by : Harlan Ellison and Yale Udoff; Teleplay by : Harlan Ellison	February 24, 1967
Jacqueline Midcult (Sharon Farrell) writes a best selling novel, The Pieces of Fate, which U.N.C.L.E. recognizes as based on a series of missing THRUSH diaries. This episode wasn't shown again in the U.S. until 1985, due to Ellison naming a literary critic after real-life science fiction writer Judith Merril, which resulted in legal action being taken, not by Merril herself (a friend of Ellison) but by her daughter. Grayson Hall played the sophisticated literary critic, who is also a newly-minted THRUSH agent.
83	24	"The Matterhorn Affair"	Bill Finnegan	Story by : Boris Ingster; Teleplay by : David Giler	March 3, 1967
A dying man carrying a partial film with the secret of Project Quasimodo, a miniature atomic bomb, gives only one clue to finding the rest of the film.
84	25	"The Hot Number Affair"	George Waggner	Joseph Cavella, Carol Cavella	March 10, 1967
A THRUSH code is hidden in a dress pattern, and Solo and Illya go to the garment district and encounter the design shop of two down-on-their-luck designers (George Tobias and Ned Glass), their model Ramona (Cher), and the cutter who has a crush on her, Jerry (Sonny Bono). THRUSH also tries to retrieve the garment, but Ramona keeps forgetting where she left it.
85	26	"The When in Roma Affair"	George Waggner	Gloria Elmore	March 17, 1967
In Rome, American tourist Darlene Sims (Julie Sommars) becomes the unwitting carrier of a perfume atomizer with a secret formula. THRUSH uses a suave ladies' man Cesare Guardia (Cesare Danova) to charm Darlene, but he falls in love with her in the process.
86	27	"The Apple a Day Affair"	E. Darrell Hallenbeck	Story by : Les Roberts and Joseph Cavella; Teleplay by : Joseph Cavella	March 24, 1967
Solo and Illya find that THRUSH agent Colonel Picks (Robert Emhardt) has developed exploding apples, which will be used to trigger a nuclear stockpile.
87	28	"The Five Daughters Affair" – Part 1	Barry Shear	Story by : Boris Ingster; Teleplay by : Norman Hudis	March 31, 1967
Solo and Illya track down the daughters of a murdered scientist who has discovered how to extract gold from seawater (and hidden the secret among his daughters), but THRUSH agent Randolph (Herbert Lom), who murdered the scientist, is after the secret as well. Joan Crawford, Telly Savalas, Curt Jürgens and Terry-Thomas appear in this episode. Incidentally, while the title refers to five daughters (technically one biological daughter and four stepdaughters) only four daughters actually appear onscreen (Kim Darby, Diane McBain, Jill Ireland and Danielle DeMetz); The fifth daughter is only referred to in a newspaper article Waverly shows to Solo and Illya. The episode was originally called "The Five Women Affair", which may have referred to Crawford, who plays the scientist's wife.
88	29	"The Five Daughters Affair" – Part 2	Barry Shear	Story by : Boris Ingster; Teleplay by : Norman Hudis	April 7, 1967
See Part 1, above. This two-parter was later released theatrically as The Karate Killers.
89	30	"The Cap and Gown Affair"	George Waggner	Stanford Sherman	April 14, 1967
Solo and Illya are responsible for the security during Waverly's upcoming address to his alma mater, but the campus is seething with protest.

=== Season 4 (1967–68) ===
No. overall	No. in season	Title	Directed by	Written by	Original release date
90	1	"The Summit-Five Affair"	Sutton Roley	Robert E. Thompson	September 11, 1967
Illya must find a security leak before the summit meeting between U.N.C.L.E.'s regional chiefs, and Solo is the prime suspect.
91	2	"The Test Tube Killer Affair"	E. Darrell Hallenbeck	Jack Turley	September 18, 1967
A dying U.N.C.L.E. agent warns Solo and Illya that a group of supermen is being bred by THRUSH. The duo discover a school set up by the enemy organization in Mexico, who has already produced seven emotionless killer students. As a graduating exercise, one is chosen to eliminate Solo and Illya after they follow the boy to Austria.
92	3	"The 'J' for Judas Affair"	Alf Kjellin	Norman Hudis	September 25, 1967
When Solo and Illya fail to keep millionaire industrialist Mark Tenza (Broderick Crawford) from being murdered, they and his son Adam (Chad Everett) have to locate Adam's brother J (short for James) to keep him from the same THRUSH-engineered fate.
93	4	"The Prince of Darkness Affair" – Part 1	Boris Sagal	Dean Hargrove	October 2, 1967
"Someone has won the race to develop a thermal prism..." Parviz Kharmusi (John Dehner) has the prism and has used it to wipe out an entire African village. Solo and Illya enlist safecracker/cult leader Luther Sebastian (Bradford Dillman) to help them find the prism.
94	5	"The Prince of Darkness Affair" – Part 2	Boris Sagal	Dean Hargrove	October 9, 1967
Sebastian has his own nefarious plans for the thermal prism. This two-parter was later released theatrically as The Helicopter Spies.
95	6	"The Master's Touch Affair"	John Brahm	Boris Sobelman	October 16, 1967
THRUSH chief and potential defector Pharos Mandor (Jack Lord) abducts Solo as part of his scheme to have U.N.C.L.E. eliminate his arch-rival Stepan Valandros (Nehemiah Persoff).
96	7	"The THRUSH Roulette Affair"	Sherman Marks	Arthur Weingarten	October 23, 1967
Solo and Illya travel to an island casino to stop a dastardly mind control plot shepherded by Michael Rennie.
97	8	"The Deadly Quest Affair"	Alf Kjellin	Robert E. Thompson	October 30, 1967
Old enemy Viktor Karmak (Darren McGavin) kidnaps Illya and gives Solo 12 hours to locate him in a condemned area of Manhattan before his Russian partner is killed by deadly gas, and before Karmak finds and kills Solo. (This episode was filmed on the burnt-out remains of the New York street set, which was destroyed by fire earlier that year.) Although this is the only non-season 1 episode to give Jerry Goldsmith credit for the score, it was adapted from his season one scores by MGM music head Robert Armbruster, and tracked into many episodes this season.
98	9	"The Fiery Angel Affair"	Richard Benedict	John W. Bloch	November 6, 1967
The beloved leader of a Latin American country, Angela (Madlyn Rhue), is endangered by a THRUSH-backed revolutionary group; can Illya and Solo save her?
99	10	"The Survival School Affair"	Charles R. Rondeau	Story by : Donald A. Brinkley; Teleplay by : Donald A. Brinkley and Jack Turley	November 20, 1967
Illya must find a THRUSH double agent hidden in the ranks of the class about to graduate from U.N.C.L.E.'s training facility on a remote island. (This is the only episode in which Robert Vaughn does not appear.)
100	11	"The Gurnius Affair"	Barry Shear	Milton S. Gelman	November 27, 1967
When a Nazi war criminal escapes from prison, the agents must track him down before he uses his mind control device to take over the world. Illya must pose as one of his compatriots, the sadistic Colonel Nexor (also played by McCallum). The dialog explicitly states the episode takes place 25 years after World War Two and the postwar trials, which would set it in 1970-1971, 3-4 years into the future when it was first broadcast.
101	12	"The Man From THRUSH Affair"	James Sheldon	Robert I. Holt	December 4, 1967
Solo masquerades as an official from THRUSH to discover the truth about a mysterious project the evil organisation is developing on the island of Ibos. All goes well until the real man from THRUSH arrives... (David McCallum does not appear in this episode.)
102	13	"The Maze Affair"	John Brahm	Leonard Stadd	December 18, 1967
Dr. Fabray (William Marshall) has invented a "molecutronic gun" – is there, as Solo and Illya believe, a link between this and the attempt by THRUSH agent Oliver Barnes (Lawrence Montaigne) to destroy a special package?
103	14	"The Deep Six Affair"	E. Darrell Hallenbeck	Leonard Stadd	December 25, 1967
While U.N.C.L.E. agent Brian Morton (Peter Bromilow) prepares for his upcoming marriage to Laura Adams (Diana Van Der Vlis), Solo and Illya aid Morton on his quest to stop a THRUSH agent (Alfred Ryder) from stealing the plans for a new super-submarine.
104	15	"The Seven Wonders of the World Affair" – Part 1	Sutton Roley	Norman Hudis	January 8, 1968
Gen. Harmon (Leslie Nielsen) has kidnapped Professor David Garrow (Dan O'Herlihy), the developer of a docility gas, and his son Steve (Tony Bill), and with the gas and soldiers, Harmon and his allies – the "Seven Intellectual Wonders of the World" – intend to take over the world. But a THRUSH agent, Mr. Webb (played by Mark Richman), and Margitta Kingsley (Eleanor Parker), the wife of an U.N.C.L.E. agent, also intend to steal the gas.
105	16	"The Seven Wonders of the World Affair" – Part 2	Sutton Roley	Norman Hudis	January 15, 1968
"The battle (between good and evil) ends once and for all in favor of good." This two-parter was released theatrically as How to Steal the World.

== Television film (1983) ==
Title	Directed by	Written by	Original release date
Return of the Man from U.N.C.L.E.: The Fifteen Years Later Affair	Ray Austin	Michael Sloan	April 5, 1983
When THRUSH steals a nuclear weapon and demands a ransom delivered by Napoleon Solo, U.N.C.L.E. recalls him and his former partner, Illya Kuryakin, to duty. (Produced by Viacom Productions instead of Metro-Goldwyn-Mayer.) George Lazenby appears as "J.B." As Leo G. Carroll was no longer available to play Alexander Waverly, Patrick Macnee was cast as the new boss (note: both Patrick Macnee and director Ray Austin were previously associated with The Avengers British TV series), the connections being that both James Bond and The Avengers had been contemporaries of the original broadcasts of The Man from U.N.C.L.E.

== Home releases ==
The complete series was released on DVD by Warner Home Video, as was a collection of the Man from U.N.C.L.E. feature films. The reunion TV-movie was released by Paramount Home Entertainment.

DVD (set) title	Company	Release date
The Man from U.N.C.L.E.: The Complete Series	Warner Home Video	21 October 2008
Return of the Man from U.N.C.L.E.	Paramount Home Entertainment	3 March 2009
The Man from U.N.C.L.E.: 8 Movies Collection	Warner Home Video	23 August 2011
