= Robert Vaughn =

American actor (1932–2016)

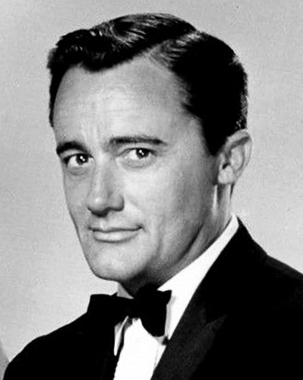
- Vaughn in The Man from U.N.C.L.E. (1964)
- Born: Robert Francis Vaughn; November 22, 1932; New York City, U.S.
- Died: November 11, 2016 (aged 83); Danbury, Connecticut, U.S.
- Occupation: Actor
- Years active: 1940s–2016
- Political party: Democratic
- Spouse: Linda Staab (m. 1974)
- Children: 2
- Awards: See article

Academic background
- Education: University of Minnesota; Los Angeles City College; Los Angeles State College (MA); University of Southern California (PhD)
- Thesis: The Influence of the House Committee on Un-American Activities on the American Theater 1938–58 (1970)

Robert Francis Vaughn (November 22, 1932 – November 11, 2016) was an American actor and political activist, whose career in film, television and theater spanned nearly six decades and who was best known for his role as the secret agent Napoleon Solo on The Man from U.N.C.L.E. (1964–68). He was a Primetime Emmy Award winner, and was nominated for the Academy Award, the BAFTA Award, two Laurel Awards, and four times for the Golden Globe Award. Vaughn also has a star on the Hollywood Walk of Fame.

Vaughn had his breakthrough role as disabled, drunken war veteran Chester A. Gwynn in The Young Philadelphians, earning him a 1960 Oscar nomination for Best Supporting Actor. He subsequently appeared in scores of films, notably as gunman Lee in The Magnificent Seven (1960), Walter Chalmers in Bullitt (1968), Major Paul Krueger in The Bridge at Remagen (1969), U.S. Senator Gary Parker in The Towering Inferno (1974), the voice of Proteus IV in Demon Seed (1977) and Ross Webster in Superman III (1983).

To television audiences, in addition to his role as Solo, Vaughn was known for his roles as private detective Harry Rule on The Protectors (1972–74), Morgan Wendell in the miniseries Centennial (1978–79), and Albert Stroller on the BBC Television drama Hustle (2004–12). He won an Emmy Award for Outstanding Supporting Actor in a Drama Series for his portrayal of the White House Chief of Staff in the miniseries Washington: Behind Closed Doors. He also appeared in the British soap opera Coronation Street as Milton Fanshaw from January until February 2012.

Aside from his acting career, Vaughn was active in Democratic Party politics. He was chair of the California Democratic State Central Committee speakers bureau during the 1960s, and publicly campaigned against the Vietnam War as a member of the peace group Another Mother for Peace. In 1970, Vaughn earned a PhD in Communication. His doctoral thesis, The Influence of the House Committee on Un-American Activities on the American Theater 1938–58, is considered "the most complete and intelligent treatment of the virulent practice of blacklisting now available."

== Early life ==
Robert Vaughn was born on November 22, 1932, to Gerald Walter and Marcella Frances (née Gaudel) Vaughn at Charity Hospital in New York City. Vaughn's father was a radio actor and his mother was a stage actress. His parents divorced, and Vaughn lived with his grandparents Frank and Mary Gaudel in Minneapolis while his mother traveled and performed.

Discussing his childhood in a 1965 New York Sunday News interview, Vaughn said, "I was a complete wreck as a child, emotionally unstable, excessively prideful," adding that he often felt miserable: "I cried all the time and I was always getting beat up."

== Education ==
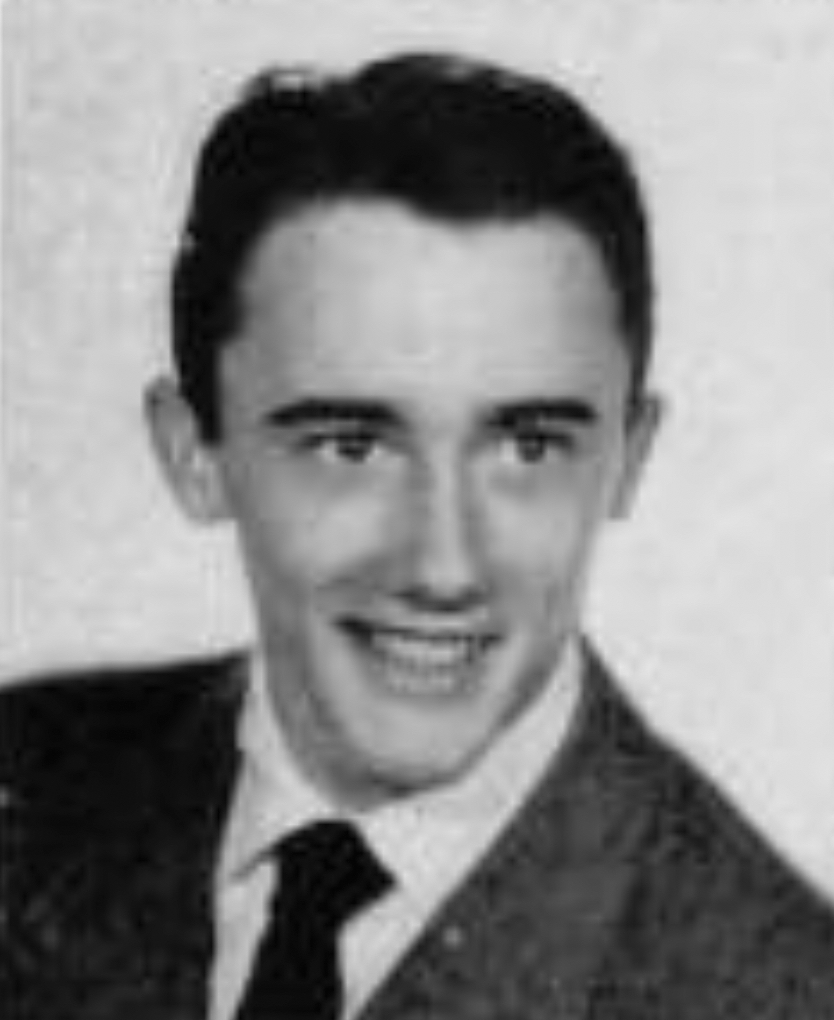
Robert Francis Vaughn senior portrait photo – 1950 North High School Polaris yearbook

Vaughn attended Lowell Elementary, Jordan Junior High School and North High School in Minneapolis, graduating in 1950. Nicknamed "Nobby", Vaughn's activity in high school included the Polaris Weekly school newspaper, the student council and various sports, including being named captain of the cross-country team.

After high school, he enrolled in the University of Minnesota as a journalism major. However, he dropped out after a year and moved to Los Angeles with his mother.

He studied theater arts at Los Angeles City College in 1956 and transferred to Los Angeles State College of Applied Arts and Sciences earning a master's degree in theater in 1960.

=== Doctoral thesis published as a book ===
Vaughn earned a PhD in Communication from the University of Southern California in 1970. His doctoral dissertation, titled "The Influence of the House Committee on Un-American Activities on the American Theater 1938–58", was an appraisal of the effect the committee's activities had on American theater. Vaughn's original research included data from questionnaires and interviews he conducted with witnesses who had been labeled "uncooperative" by the House Un-American Activities Committee.

In 1972, he published his dissertation as a book titled Only Victims: A Study of Show Business Blacklisting. Kirkus Reviews lists the book as "the most complete and intelligent treatment of the virulent practice of blacklisting now available". Still in print, the book is regularly assigned to law students.

== Military service ==
Vaughn was inducted into the U.S. Army Reserve on November 29, 1955, and entered active duty on December 18, 1956, at Fort Ord, California. During his first leave, he discovered his mother had been diagnosed with Berger's disease, an often fatal kidney disorder. Vaughn applied for an Honorable Hardship discharge. While waiting for a decision, Vaughn was held over at Fort Ord and served as a drill instructor. Discharged from active duty on May 26, 1957, he again served in the U.S. Army Reserve until November 1962.

== Acting career ==
=== Early encouragement ===
Vaughn's mother encouraged his becoming an actor early in his life. She taught Vaughn to recite Shakespeare's “To be or not to be” soliloquy from Hamlet when he was five.

Vaughn's mother assisted him in being cast on radio shows in the Chicago area. He debuted on radio playing the part of Billy on Jack Armstrong, the All-American Boy broadcast on WBBM (AM) radio.

In 1950 Vaughn worked as a page at Minneapolis' WCCO (AM). "My job was a kind of glorified page boy position, but I was allowed to wear civvies rather than the silly uniforms often sported by studio guides and messengers in those days".

His first film appearance was as an extra in The Ten Commandments (1956), playing a golden calf idolator. Vaughn is also visible during a chariot scene behind Yul Brynner.

Vaughn's first credited movie role was the Western Hell's Crossroads (1957), in which he played Bob Ford, the murderer of outlaw Jesse James. Seen by Burt Lancaster in Calder Willingham's play End as a Man, Vaughn was signed with Lancaster's film company and was to have played the Steve Dallas role in Sweet Smell of Success. Vaughn appeared as Stan Gray in the episode "The Twisted Road" of the western syndicated series Frontier Doctor. Vaughn played in at least one episode of The Rifleman. He played Dan, a West Point dropout who was appointed temporary Marshal of North Fork.

=== Helped by Paul Newman ===
Vaughn's first notable appearance was in The Young Philadelphians (1959). Vaughn credited Paul Newman with helping him earn his first major film role. "The person who launched my career into A-list movies was Paul Newman. When my agent called and said Warner Bros. had a role for me in The Young Philadelphians, I mentioned it to Paul, who belonged to the same health club I did. He told me it was the perfect role for me and offered to do the screen test with me. That was unheard of. In a screen test, you run your lines with a script girl who is off camera. I had never done one before, but Paul did it with me and the result was wonderful".

In the film, Vaughn portrayed alcoholic veteran Chet Gwynn who lost his arm in the Korean War and was falsely accused of murder. His acting in the film earned Vaughn nominations for both the Academy Award for Best Supporting Actor and the Golden Globe Award for Best Supporting Actor – Motion Picture.

=== The Magnificent Seven ===
Vaughn's next role was the gun for hire Lee in director John Sturges' 1960 film The Magnificent Seven. The film was an adaptation of Akira Kurosawa's 1954 Japanese samurai epic Seven Samurai set in the American frontier.

Vaughn recalled the morning in January when he arrived in Sturges' office for his audition, "...an ax was hanging over every movie project in Hollywood. Unless the casting for a picture was completed by noon on a particular Friday, production couldn't begin". Telling Vaughn he wanted to cast him based on his performance in The Young Philadelphians, Sturges said, "We don't have a script, just Kurosawa's picture to work from. You'll have to go on faith. But we'll be filming in Cuernavaca. Never been there? You'll love it — it's the 'Palm Springs of Mexico'." Vaughn told Sturges, "I'm in." Saying, "Good decision, young man," Sturges asked, "And do you know any other good young actors? I've got four other slots to fill." Vaughn suggested James Coburn, a friend and former classmate. Sturges hired Coburn.

Vaughn's portrayal of hired gunslinger Lee included wearing black gloves throughout the film, signifying his reluctance to "get his hands dirty" even while continuing to kill for hire.

Vaughn's acting showed Lee's internal struggle with cowardice. Having lost his nerve, he could not fight until he finally summoned the internal courage to face certain death while freeing hostages. When offered the chance to run, Vaughn's Lee is told, "Go ahead, Lee, you don't owe anything to anybody." His answer? "Except to myself."

Vaughn died in 2016, the last of The Magnificent Seven actors.

=== Bullitt ===
After The Man From U.N.C.L.E. series ended, Vaughn landed a major film role playing Walter Chalmers, a U.S. Senator in the film Bullitt starring Steve McQueen; he was nominated for a BAFTA Award for Best Supporting Actor for this role.

=== Superman III ===
In 1983, he starred as villainous multi-millionaire Ross Webster in Superman III.

== Television career ==
=== Debut ===
Vaughn made his television debut on the November 21, 1955, "Black Friday" episode of the American television series Medic, the first of Vaughn's over two hundred episodic television roles through the mid-2000s.

=== Gunsmoke ===
In 1956, Vaughn made his first guest appearance on Gunsmoke in the episode entitled "Cooter." The following year, he made his second guest appearance on Gunsmoke opposite Barbara Eden in the episode "Romeo," the plot of which was loosely based on Shakespeare's Romeo and Juliet, as it turned out well for the bride and groom.

=== The Boston Terrier ===
In 1962, Vaughn starred as Boston based private detective A. Dunster Lowell in The Boston Terrier episode of the NBC network's anthology series The Dick Powell Show. The episode was a pilot episode of a proposed Blake Edwards TV series. Edwards had created the popular Peter Gunn television show.

=== The Dick Van Dyke Show ===
In 1963, Vaughn appeared in an episode of The Dick Van Dyke Show as Jim Darling, a successful businessman and an old flame of Laura Petrie in the episode "It's a Shame She Married Me".

=== The Lieutenant ===
During the 1963–64 season of The Lieutenant, Vaughn appeared as Captain Raymond Rambridge alongside Gary Lockwood, who played a Marine second lieutenant at Camp Pendleton. Vaughn had guest-starred on Lockwood's 1961–62 series Follow the Sun.

=== The Man from U.N.C.L.E. ===
His dissatisfaction with the somewhat diminished aspect of the Rambridge character led Vaughn to request an expanded role. During the conference, his name came up in a telephone call and he ended up being offered a series of his own—as Napoleon Solo, title character in a series originally to be called Solo, but which became The Man from U.N.C.L.E. after the pilot was reshot with Leo G. Carroll in the role of Solo's boss. This was the role which would make Vaughn a household name even behind the Iron Curtain.

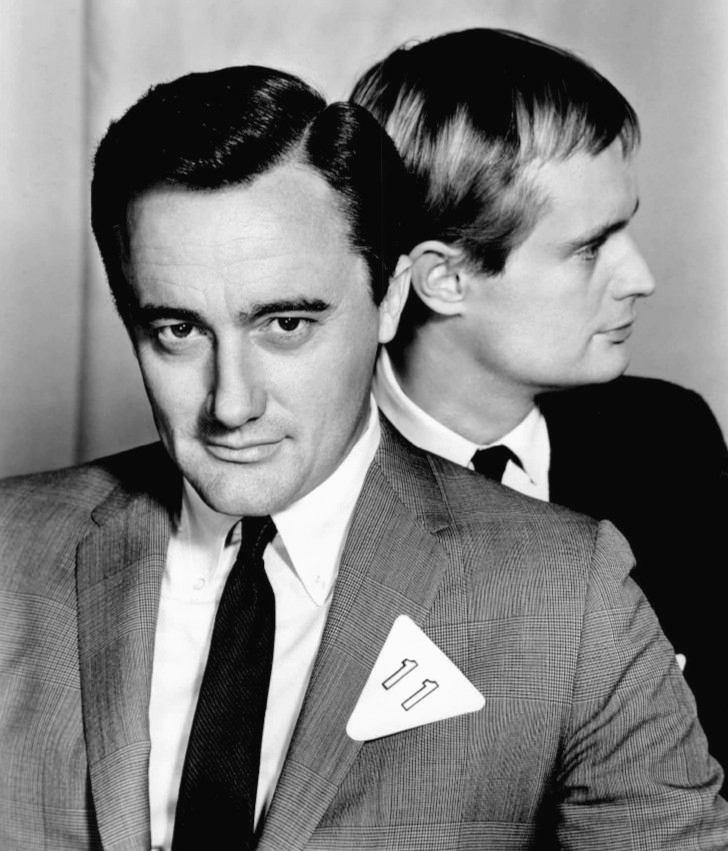
Vaughn as Napoleon Solo with David McCallum as Illya Kuryakin

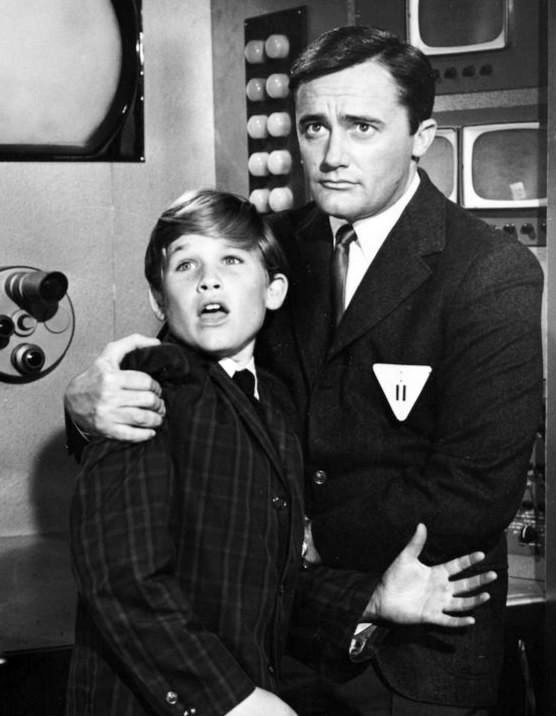
Vaughn with Kurt Russell in a 1964 episode of The Man from U.N.C.L.E.

From 1964 to 1968, Vaughn played Solo with Scottish co-star David McCallum playing his fellow agent, Illya Kuryakin. This production spawned a spinoff show, large amounts of merchandising, overseas theatrical movies of re-edited episodes, and a sequel, Return of the Man from U.N.C.L.E..

Explaining the two The Man from U.N.C.L.E. characters' appeal, Vaughn said, “Girls age 9 to 12 liked David McCallum because he was so sweet, but the old ladies and the 13- to 16-year-olds liked me because I was so detached”.

At the height of The Man from U.N.C.L.E. show's popularity, Vaughn reported receiving 70,000 fan letters a month. "I was bombarded with house and apartment keys labeled with the addresses of the adoring girls who lived behind those doors," he wrote in his 2008 memoir, A Fortunate Life. "At the end of our first season, I had to put up an electric fence around my house to keep out the girls. I even tried using recorded animal noises to fend off my visitors, but I could never operate the sound system."

Vaughn said the success of the show boosted his career. "Not only was it a great deal of fun, it changed me from being a working actor to a negotiating actor. After U.N.C.L.E., I never accepted the first offer: if I wanted more money, I asked for it. A better dressing room? Four first-class tickets instead of two? I'd ask for them, and I'd often get them."

In 1966, during the initial The Man from U.N.C.L.E. broadcast run, Vaughn appeared as a bachelor on the premiere episode of the nighttime version of The Dating Game which aired on October 6, 1966. Karen Carlson, the 1964 Miss America pageant first runner-up, chose Vaughn as her date, which included a trip to London, England.

After The Man from U.N.C.L.E was canceled in 1968, Vaughn continued to appear on television and in films.

=== The Protectors ===
Vaughn starred in two seasons of the British detective series The Protectors from 1972 through 1974. Vaughn was disappointed in the show, saying the series was "much below the American standard". He sad the show "may have the redeeming feature of any escapist entertainment, that you can sit down for 22 minutes and watch people in pretty clothes run around shooting guns and so get your mind off your personal problems. If that's redemptive, it has that quality."

=== Daytime television ===
Vaughn first appeared on daytime television in 1995 as a guest-star playing Rick Hamlin on the CBS soap opera As the World Turns. Vaughn later appeared in 1996 on ABC's One Life to Live playing the role of Bishop Corrington.

In 2012 Vaughn appeared for three weeks in the British soap opera Coronation Street as wealthy American Milton Fanshaw.

=== The Magnificent Seven ===
Vaughn played Judge Oren Travis on the 1998–2000 CBS television series The Magnificent Seven.

=== Hustle ===
Vaughn experienced a resurgence in 2004. He began co-starring in the British TV drama series Hustle, made for BBC One. The series was also broadcast in the United States on the AMC cable channel. In the series, Vaughn played elder-statesman American con artist Albert Stroller, a father figure to a group of younger grifters. He ultimately appeared in all eight series aired from 2004 to 2012.

When show producer Simon Crawford Collins met Vaughn, he recognized "straight away that he could bring a whole new dimension to the part of Albert". He later called Vaughn, offering him the role. Vaughn said during the call he was "told to get on a plane an hour after I got the phone call and start shooting the following day."

In 2006, Vaughn said "I imagined that Napoleon Solo had retired from U.N.C.L.E., whatever U.N.C.L.E. was. What could he do now to use his talents and to supplement his government pension? I imagined Stroller as Napoleon Solo, The Later Years".

=== Other appearances ===
He also appeared in two episodes of Columbo during the mid-1970s, "Troubled Waters" (1975) and "Last Salute to the Commodore" (1976). The latter episode is one of the few in the series where the identity of the murderer is not known until the end. Vaughn won an Emmy for his portrayal of Frank Flaherty in Washington: Behind Closed Doors (ABC, 1977) and during the 1980s starred with friend George Peppard in the final season of The A-Team. Vaughn played Morgan Wendell, opponent to Paul Garrett played by David Janssen in the 1978–79 miniseries Centennial.

Vaughn portrayed Presidents Franklin D. Roosevelt and Harry S. Truman, in addition to Woodrow Wilson (in the 1979 television mini-series Backstairs at the White House). He additionally played Roosevelt in the 1982 HBO telefilm FDR: That Man in the White House. In 1983–1984, he appeared as industrialist Harlan Adams in the short-lived series Emerald Point N.A.S., replacing Patrick O'Neal. Vaughn guest-starred as the mercenary "Rykker" in the Season 1 episodes "Dragonswing" (1993) and "Dragonswing II" (1994) of Kung Fu: The Legend Continues. In the mid-1990s, he made several cameo appearances on Late Night with Conan O'Brien as an audience member who berates the host and his guests beginning with "you people make me sick."

On Law & Order, Vaughn had a recurring role during season eight as Carl Anderton, a wealthy businessman who vows revenge on the NYC DA's office and longtime friend Adam Schiff for sending his grandson to juvenile correction for murdering his stepsister. In September 2006, he guest-starred on an episode of Law & Order: Special Victims Unit.

Vaughn also appeared as himself narrating and being a character in a radio play broadcast by BBC Radio 4 in 2007 about making the film The Bridge at Remagen in Prague, during the Russian invasion of 1968.

== Production company ==
In 1966, Vaughn founded a film production company, Ferdporqui Productions with his lifelong best friend actor Sherwood Price. The company was headquartered at the M.G.M. Studios in Culver City, California. They purchased production options on books and scripts in the 1960s. In 1966 they acquired the production rights to Joseph Sargent's "story idea" Bridge on the River Hudson and hired Peter Allan Fields to produce a script treatment. Vaughn was reportedly to star in their first independent film venture. They also acquired the rights to Robert Laxalt's novel The Man in the Wheatfield in 1966 and sought investors in the proposed film's production.

In 1968, the company opened a branch office in Great Britain. In the 1970s Ferdporqui Productions provided production management on The Protectors which starred Vaughn.

== Other investments ==
Vaughn's investments included profitable livestock herds and west Texas gas wells which made him a millionaire. In 1967, one of his wells saw an increase in production output from $13 per week to $270 per day, a $98,550 annual output (equivalent to $951,568 in 2025). The reportedly frugal Vaughn said, "If it went tomorrow, it wouldn't visibly change my life." Vaughn said he had lived on one-quarter of his salary for the past ten years and that his business manager allowed him $25 spending money per week.

== Advertising pitch man ==
In later years, Vaughn appeared in syndicated advertisements marketed by Commercial Pro, Inc. for various personal injury and workers compensation law firms, using the catchphrase, "Tell them you mean business".

Vaughn was also an infomercial pitchman from 1985 through 1990 for the Helsinki Formula, a claimed baldness cure. In 1994 the Federal Trade Commission sued, blocking the product's bogus claims, but $100 million of the product had already been sold.

In 1993, Vaughn told The Los Angeles Times he had no problem promoting the Helsinki Formula "cure". He said, "That was about the most profitable thing I've ever done in my life. Every call that came in on the 800 number, I got a piece of that."

== Personal life ==
During the late 1960s, Joyce Jameson was a girlfriend of Vaughn's. She acted opposite Vaughn as a guest star on a 1966 U.N.C.L.E. episode "The Dippy Blond Affair".

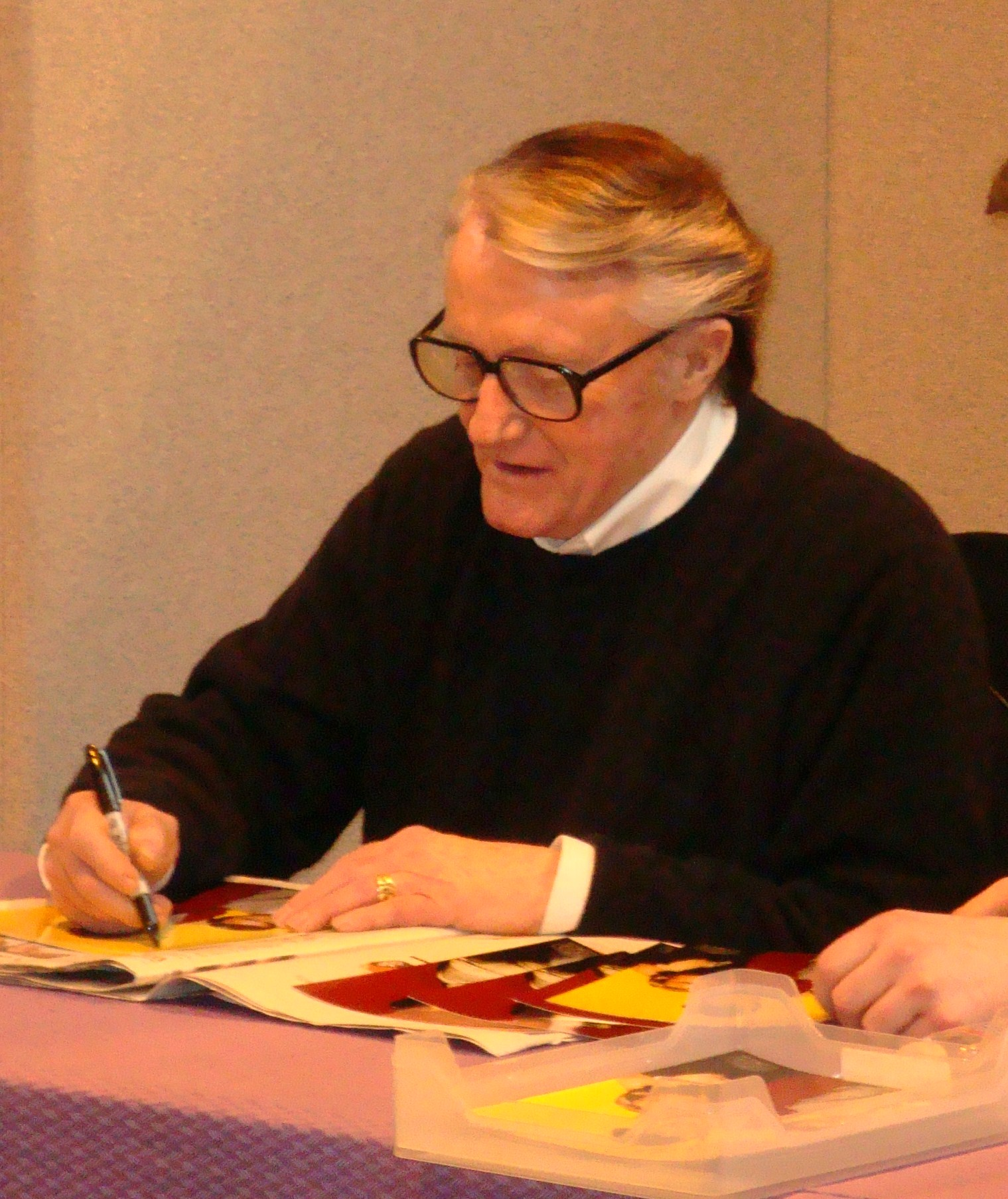
Vaughn at a memorabilia event in March 2009

Vaughn married actress Linda Staab in 1974. They had appeared together in a 1973 episode of The Protectors, called "It Could Be Practically Anywhere on the Island". They adopted two children, Cassidy (born 1976) and Caitlin (born 1981). They resided in Ridgefield, Connecticut.

For many years, it was believed Vaughn was the biological father of English film director and producer Matthew Vaughn, born when the actor was in a relationship with early 1970s socialite Kathy Ceaton. However, a paternity investigation identified the father as George de Vere Drummond, an English aristocrat and godson of King George VI. Early in Matthew's life, when all believed Vaughn was the father, he asked for "his" child's surname to be Vaughn, which Matthew continues to use professionally, still seeing Vaughn as his social father, even if not biologically.

=== Recordings ===
In 1967 Vaughn released the MGM Records spoken word album Readings From Hamlet, which featured him performing seven excerpts from Shakespeare's Hamlet accompanied with incidental music. The MGM Records E/SE-4488 lp was released in both mono and stereo formats.

=== Books ===
Vaughn published Only Victims: A Study of Show Business Blacklisting in 1972.

His second book, A Fortunate Life, was an autobiography published in 2008 in which Vaughn said of his life, "With a modest amount of looks and talent and more than a modicum of serendipity, I've managed to stretch my 15 minutes of fame into more than half a century of good fortune." "The breaks all fell my way".

== Political views ==
Vaughn was a longtime member of the Democratic Party. His family was also Democratic and was involved in politics in Minneapolis. Early in his career, he was described as a "liberal Democrat". He was opposed to the Hollywood Blacklist of suspected Communists on freedom of speech principles, but Vaughn also was opposed to Communism as a totalitarian system. Vaughn campaigned for John F. Kennedy in the 1960 United States presidential election. He was the chair of the California Democratic State Central Committee speakers bureau and actively campaigned for candidates in the 1960s.

Vaughn was the first popular American actor to take a public stand against the Vietnam War and was active in the peace group Another Mother for Peace. Vaughn debated with William F. Buckley Jr. on his program Firing Line on the Vietnam War. With Dick Van Dyke and Carl Reiner, he was a founder of Dissenting Democrats. Early in the 1968 presidential election, they supported the candidacy of Minnesota Senator Eugene McCarthy, who was running for president as an alternative to Vice President Hubert Humphrey, who had supported President Lyndon Johnson's escalation of the war in Vietnam.

Vaughn was reported to have had political ambitions of his own; however, in a 1973 interview, he denied having had any political aspirations. In a conversation with historian Jack Sanders, he stated that after the assassination of Robert F. Kennedy in 1968, "I lost heart for the battle".

== Death ==
Vaughn died in a hospice in Danbury, Connecticut, on November 11, 2016, at the age of 83, after undergoing a year-long treatment for leukemia.

== Accolades ==
- 1960: Academy Award nominee – Actor in a Supporting Role – The Young Philadelphians
- 1960: Golden Globe nominee – Best Supporting Actor – The Young Philadelphians
- 1961: Golden Globe nominee – New Star of the Year – Actor – The Magnificent Seven
- 1965: Golden Globe nominee – Actor in a Television Series – The Man from U.N.C.L.E.
- 1965: Photoplay – Most Popular Male Star
- 1966: Golden Globe nominee – Actor in a Television Series – The Man from U.N.C.L.E.
- 1970: BAFTA Film Award nominee – Best Actor in a Supporting Role – Bullitt
- 1978: Emmy Award – Outstanding Continuing Performance by a Supporting Actor – Washington: Behind Closed Doors
- 1979: Emmy Award nominee – Outstanding Supporting Actor in a Limited Series – Backstairs at the White House
- 1998: Hollywood Walk of Fame Star, 6600 block of Hollywood Boulevard

== Theater ==
Year	Title	Role	Theatre	Dates	Notes
1955	The Pilgrimage	Judas Iscariot	Pilgrimage Theater, Hollywood	Unknown	Pilgrimage Theater is now known as the John Anson Ford Amphitheatre.
1979	The Real Inspector Hound	Moon	United States	Unknown	
1985	Inherit The Wind	Henry Drummond	Paper Mill Playhouse, Millburn, NJ	March 1985	
1989	Love Letters	Andrew Makepiece Ladd III	Edison Theatre	October 31, 1989 – January 21, 1990	Directed by John Tillinger; Written by A.R. Gurney
2013	Twelve Angry Men	Juror 9	Birmingham Repertory Theatre; Garrick Theatre	October 2013; November 2013 – June 2014	

== Filmography ==
=== Film ===
Year	Title	Role	Notes
1956	The Ten Commandments	Spearman / Hebrew at Golden Calf	Biblical epic film produced and directed by Cecil B. DeMille.; Uncredited
1957	Hell's Crossroads	Bob Ford	Western film directed by Franklin Adreon.
1957	No Time to Be Young	Buddy Root	Film noir drama film directed by David Lowell Rich.
1958	Teenage Cave Man	The Symbol Maker's Teenage Son	Independent black-and-white adventure–science fiction film produced and directed by Roger Corman.
1958	Unwed Mother	Don Bigelow	Drama film directed by Walter A. Doniger.
1959	Good Day for a Hanging	Eddie Campbell	Western film directed by Nathan H. Juran.
1959	The Young Philadelphians	Chester A. Gwynn	Drama film directed by Vincent Sherman.; Oscar nomination for best supporting actor.; Based on the 1956 novel, The Philadelphian, by Richard P. Powell.
1960	The Magnificent Seven	Lee	Western film directed by John Sturges.
1961	The Big Show	Klaus Everard	DeLuxe Color and CinemaScope drama film directed by James B. Clark.; Based on Jerome Weidman's novel I'll Never Go There Any More.
1963	The Caretakers	Jim Melford	Drama film produced and directed by Hall Bartlett.; Based on the 1959 novel The Caretakers by Dariel Telfer.
1964	To Trap a Spy	Napoleon Solo	Feature length film of the Pilot episode of The Man from U.N.C.L.E. directed by Don Medford.
1965	The Spy with My Face	Napoleon Solo	Spy-fi spy film based on The Man from U.N.C.L.E. and directed by John Newland.
1966	One Spy Too Many	Napoleon Solo	Feature-length film of The Man from U.N.C.L.E.'s two–part season two premiere episode "Alexander the Greater Affair" written by Dean Hargrove and directed by Joseph Sargent.
1966	The Glass Bottom Boat	Napoleon Solo	Romantic comedy film directed by Frank Tashlin.; Also known as The Spy in Lace Panties.; cameo appearance
1966	One of Our Spies is Missing	Napoleon Solo	Feature length film of The Man from U.N.C.L.E.'s second season two–part episode "The Bridge of Lions Affair" directed by E. Darrell Hallenbeck and written by Howard Rodman.; Based on The Bridge of Lions novel by Henry Slesar.
1967	The Spy in the Green Hat	Napoleon Solo	Feature-length film of The Man from U.N.C.L.E.'s third season two–part episode "The Concrete Overcoat Affair" directed by Joseph Sargent and written by Peter Allan Fields with the story by David Victor.
1967	The Venetian Affair	Bill Fenner	Spy film directed by Jerry Thorpe.; Based on a novel of the same name by Helen MacInnes.
1967	The Karate Killers	Napoleon Solo	Feature-length film of The Man from U.N.C.L.E.'s third season two–part episode "The Five Daughters Affair" directed by Barry Shear and written by Norman Hudis with the story by Boris Ingster.
1968	The Helicopter Spies	Napoleon Solo	Feature-length film of The Man from U.N.C.L.E.'s fourth season two–part episode "The Prince of Darkness Affair" directed by Boris Sagal and written by Dean Hargrove.
1968	How to Steal the World	Napoleon Solo	Feature-length film of The Man from U.N.C.L.E.'s two–part series finale episodes "The Seven Wonders of the World Affair" directed by Sutton Roley and written by Norman Hudis.
1968	Bullitt	Walter Chalmers	Drama–thriller film directed by Peter Yates and produced by Philip D'Antoni.
1969	If It's Tuesday, This Must Be Belgium	Antonio, Photographer	DeLuxe Color romantic comedy film directed by Mel Stuart.
1969	The Bridge at Remagen	Major Paul Kreuger	War film directed by John Guillermin.; Based on the book The Bridge at Remagen: The Amazing Story of March 7, 1945 by writer and U. S. Representative Ken Hechler.
1970	Julius Caesar	Servilius Casca	British independent adaptation of William Shakespeare's play of the same name, directed by Stuart Burge and written by Robert Furnival.
1970	The Mind of Mr. Soames	Dr. Michael Bergen	Sci-fi–drama film directed by Alan Cooke.; Based on Charles Eric Maine's 1961 novel of the same name.
1971	The Statue	Ray Whiteley	British comedy film directed by Rodney Amateau.; Based on the play Chip, Chip, Chip by Alec Coppel.
1971	Clay Pigeon	Neilson	Action film directed by Lane Slate and Tom Stern.
1974	The Man from Independence	Harry S Truman	Biographical–drama film directed by Jack Smight and written by Edward DeBlasio.
1974	The Towering Inferno	Senator Parker	Action–drama disaster film directed by John Guillermin.
1975	Wanted: Babysitter	Stuart Chase	Thriller–drama film directed by René Clément.; Also known as in French: La Baby-Sitter, Italian: Babysitter – Un maledetto pasticcio, and German: Das ganz große Ding.
1976	Atraco en la jungla	Tony	Adventure–crime film directed by Gordon Hessler.; Also known as 3–Way Split. Blue Jeans and Dynamite, and Double Cross.
1977	Demon Seed	Proteus IV	Sci-fi–horror film directed by Donald Cammell.; Based on the novel of the same name by Dean Koontz.
1977	Starship Invasions	Professor Allan Duncan	Science fiction film directed, produced, and written by Ed Hunt; Also known as in French: L'invasion des soucoupes volantes.
1978	The Lucifer Complex	Glen Manning	Science fiction film directed by Kenneth Hartford & David L. Hewitt and written by Hewitt & Dale Skillicorn.
1978	Brass Target	Colonel Donald Rogers	Post-World War II suspense film directed by John Hough.; Based on the novel The Algonquin Project by Frederick Nolan.
1979	Good Luck, Miss Wyckoff	Dr. Neal	Drama film directed by Marvin J. Chomsky.
1980	Cuba Crossing	Hud	Action film directed by Chuck Workman.; Also known as Assignment: Kill Castro
1980	Virus	Senator Barkley	Japanese post-apocalyptic Science fiction film directed by Kinji Fukasaku.; Based on Sakyo Komatsu's eponymous 1964 novel in which the English version was printed in 2012.; Also known as Virus (復活の日, Fukkatsu no hi) (literal translation: Day of Resurrection) in Japanese.
1980	Hangar 18	Gordon Cain	Action science fiction film directed by James L. Conway and written by Ken Pettus with the story by Thomas C. Chapman and Conway.
1980	Battle Beyond the Stars	Gelt	Science fiction–adventure film directed by Jimmy T. Murakami.
1981	S.O.B.	David Blackman	Comedy film written and directed by Blake Edwards.
1983	Superman III	Ross Webster	British superhero film directed by Richard Lester and based on the DC Comics character Superman.
1983	Great Transport	Dr. Emil Kovac	Action–drama war film directed by Veljko Bulajić.; Also known as in Serbo-Croatian: Veliki transport.
1986	Black Moon Rising	Ed Ryland	Action film directed by Harley Cokliss and written by John Carpenter.
1986	The Delta Force	General Woodbridge	
1987	Hour of the Assassin	Sam Merrick	
1987	They Call Me Renegade	Lawson	
1987	Killing Birds	Dr. Fred Brown	
1988	Skeleton Coast	Major Schneider	
1988	Captive Rage	Eduard Delacorte	
1988	Another Way: D-Kikan Joho	Mr. D	Japanese film
1989	The Emissary	Ambassador Ed MacKay	
1989	That's Adequate	Adolf Hitler	
1989	C.H.U.D. II: Bud the C.H.U.D.	Colonel Masters	
1989	River of Death	Dr. Wolfgang Manteuffel	
1989	Transylvania Twist	Lord Byron Orlock	
1990	Buried Alive	Gary Julian	
1990	Nobody's Perfect	Dr. Duncan	
1991	Going Under	Wedgewood	Also known as Dive!
1992	Blind Vision	Mr. X	
1994	Dust to Dust	Mayor Sampson Moses	
1995	Witch Academy	The Devil	
1996	Joe's Apartment	Senator Dougherty	
1996	Milk & Money	Uncle Andre	
1997	Menno's Mind	Senator Zachary Powell	
1997	Motel Blue	Chief MacIntyre	
1997	Vulcan	Vince Baxter	
1997	An American Affair	Professor Michaels	
1998	Visions	Agent Silvestri	
1998	McCinsey's Island	Walter Denkins	
1998	The Sender	Ron Fairfax	
1998	BASEketball	Baxter Cain	Vaughn's 100th feature film
2001	Pootie Tang	Dick Lecter	
2002	Cottonmouth	Judge Mancini	
2003	Happy Hour	Tulley Sr.	
2003	Doug McPlug: The Life and Times		
2003	Hoodlum & Son	Benny 'The Bomb' Palladino	
2004	Scene Stealers	Dr. Gadsden Braden	
2004	2BPerfectlyHonest	Nick	
2004	Gang Warz	Chief Hannigan	
2012	Excuse Me for Living	Jacob	
2012	The Magnificent Eleven	American Bob	
2014	A Cry from Within	Doc Williams	
2016	The American Side	Silver-Haired Man	
2016	Gold Star	Carmine	(final film role)

=== Television ===
- Medic (1955) (Season 2 Episode 9: "Black Friday") as Dr. Charles A. Leale
- Frontier (1956) (Season 1 Episode 30: "The Return of Jubal Dolan") as Cliff Dolan
- Father Knows Best (1956) (Season 3 Episode 13: "Betty Goes Steady") as Mr. Beekman
- Gunsmoke (1956-1957) (2 episodes)
  - (Season 1 Episode 27: "Cooter") (1956) as Kid
  - (Season 3 Episode 9: "Romeo") (1957) as Andy Bowers
- Zane Grey Theater (1956–1957) (2 episodes)
  - (Season 1 Episode 11: "Courage is a Gun") (1956) as Johnny Adler
  - (Season 2 Episode 3: "A Gun Is for Killing") (1957) as Billy Jack
- Tales of Wells Fargo (1957–1961) (2 episodes)
  - (Season 2 Episode 7: "Billy the Kid") (1957) as Billy the Kid
  - (Season 6 Episode 3: "Treasure Coach") (1961) as Billy Brigode
- Whirlybirds (1958) (Season 2 Episode 25: "Robert Dixon, M.D.") as Dr. Bob Dixon
- The Rifleman (1958) (Season 1 Episode 11: "The Apprentice Sheriff") as Marshal Dan Willard
- Wagon Train (1958-1960) (2 episodes)
  - (Season 1 Episode 37: "The John Wilbot Story") (1958) as Roy Pelham
  - (Season 4 Episode 13: "The Roger Bigelow Story") (1960) as Roger Bigelow
- State Trooper (1959) (Episode: "Another Chance") as George Jones
- Alfred Hitchcock Presents (1959) (Season 5 Episode 7: "Dry Run") as Art
- Zorro (1959) (Season 2 Episode 20: "Spark of Revenge") as Miguel Roverto
- Law of the Plainsman (1959) (2 episodes)
  - (Season 1 Episode 10: "The Dude") as Theodore Roosevelt
  - (Season 1 Episode 11: "The Innocents") as Ross Drake
- Wichita Town (1959) (Season 1 Episode 9: "Passage to the Enemy") as Frank Warren
- The Lineup (1959) (Season 6 Episode 6: "Prelude to Violence") as Bart Wade
- Bronco (1959) (Season 1 Episode 12: "Borrowed Glory") as Sheriff Lloyd Stover
- The DuPont Show with June Allyson (1960) (Season 2 Episode 11: "Emergency") as Dr. Collins
- Checkmate (1960) (Season 1 Episode 2: "Interrupted Honeymoon") as Abner Benson
- Men into Space (1960) (Season 1 Episode 20: "Moon Cloud") as Perry Holcomb
- The Rebel (1960) (Season 1 Episode 19: "Noblesse Oblige") as Asa Bannister
- Laramie (1960) (Season 2 Episode 7: "The Dark Trail") as Sandy Kayle
- The Man from Blackhawk (1960) (Season 1 Episode 26: "Remember Me Not") as Hayworth
- Thriller (1961) (Season 1 Episode 24: "The Ordeal of Dr. Cordell") as Dr. Frank Cordell
- The Asphalt Jungle (1961) (Season 1 Episode 13: "The Scott Machine") as Warren W. Scott
- Target: The Corruptors (1961) (Season 1 Episode 10: "To Wear a Badge") as Lace
- Bonanza (1962) (Season 4 Episode 6: "The Way Station") as Luke Martin
- Kraft Mystery Theatre (196) (Season 2 Episode 2: "Death of a Dream") as Bill Gardner
- The Eleventh Hour (1962–63) (2 episodes)
  - (Season 1 Episode 11: "The Blues My Babe Gave to Me") (1962) as Peter Warren
  - (Season 2 Episode 2: "The Silence of Good Men") (1963) as St. Mark
- The Untouchables (1963) (Season 4 Episode 26: "The Charlie Argos Story") as Charlie Argos
- The Virginian (1963) (Season 1 Episode 20: "If You Have Tears") as Simon Clain
- The Dick Van Dyke Show (1963) (Season 2 Episode 29: "It's a Shame She Married Me") as Jim Darling
- The Lieutenant (1963–64) (17 episodes) as Captain Raymond Rambridge
- The Man from U.N.C.L.E. (1964–68) (105 episodes) as Napoleon Solo / Thrush Double
- Gideon's Way (British TV series) (1965) (Season 1 Episode 24: "The Reluctant Witness") as Police Officer (uncredited)
- The Girl from U.N.C.L.E. (1966) (Season 1 Episode 3: "The Mother Muffin Affair") as Napoleon Solo
- Please Don't Eat the Daisies (1966) (Season 1 Episode 18: "Say UNCLE") cameo as Napoleon Solo
- The Woman Hunter (1972 television film) as Jerry Hunter
- The Protectors (1972–74) (52 episodes) as Harry Rule
- Columbo (1975–1976) (2 episodes)
  - (Season 4 Episode 4: "Troubled Waters") (1975) as Hayden Danziger
  - (Season 5 Episode 6: "Last Salute to the Commodore") (1976) as Charles 'Charlie' Clay
- Captains and the Kings (1976 mini-series) (6 episodes) as Charles Desmond
  - (Season 1 Episode 2: "Chapter II")
  - (Season 1 Episode 3: "Chapter III")
  - (Season 1 Episode 4: "Chapter IV")
  - (Season 1 Episode 5: "Chapter V")
  - (Season 1 Episode 7: "Chapter VII")
  - (Season 1 Episode 8: "Chapter VIII")
- Washington: Behind Closed Doors (1977) (6 episodes) as Frank Flaherty
  - (Season 1 Episode 1: "Part 1")
  - (Season 1 Episode 2: "Part 2")
  - (Season 1 Episode 3: "Part 3")
  - (Season 1 Episode 4: "Part 4")
  - (Season 1 Episode 5: "Part 5")
  - (Season 1 Episode 6: "Part 6")
- The Feather and Father Gang (1977) (Season 1 Episode 10: "Murder at F-Stop II") as Winslow
- The Eddie Capra Mysteries (1978) (Pilot Episode: "Nightmare at Pendragon Castle") as Charles Arthur Pendragon
- Centennial (1978–1979) (10 episodes) as Morgan Wendell
  - (Season 1 Episode 3: "The Wagon and the Elephant") (1978) (credit only)
  - (Season 1 Episode 4: "For as Long as the Waters Flow") (1978)
  - (Season 1 Episode 5: "The Massacre") (1978)
  - (Season 1 Episode 6: "The Longhorns") (1978)
  - (Season 1 Episode 7: "The Shepherds") (1978)
  - (Season 1 Episode 8: "The Storm") (1979)
  - (Season 1 Episode 9: "The Crime") (1979)
  - (Season 1 Episode 10: "The Winds of Fortune") (1979)
  - (Season 1 Episode 11: "The Winds of Death") (1979)
  - (Season 1 Episode 12: "The Scream of Eagles") (1979)
- The Rebels (1979) as Seth McLean
- Hawaii Five-O (1979) (Season 11 Episode 15: "The Spirit is Willie") as Sebastian Rolande
- Backstairs at the White House (1979) (TV mini-series) (Season 1 Episode 1) as Woodrow Wilson)
- Trapper John, M.D. (1980) (2 episodes) as T.K. Sheldon
  - (Season 2 Episode 1: "Girl Under Glass: Part 1")
  - (Season 2 Episode 2: "Girl Under Glass: Part 2")
- Fantasies (1982) (Television film) as Girard
- Inside the Third Reich (1982) (Television film) as Field Marshal Milch
- The Day the Bubble Burst (1982) (Television film) as Richard Whitney
- The Blue and the Gray (1982) (TV mini-series) (3 episodes) as Senator Reynolds
  - (Season 1 Episode 1: "Part 1")
  - (Season 1 Episode 2: "Part 2")
  - (Season 1 Episode 3: "Part 3")
- The Return of the Man from U.N.C.L.E.: The Fifteen-Years-Later Affair (1983) (Television film) as Napoleon Solo
- Silent Reach (1983) (TV mini-series) (2 episodes) as Steven Sinclair
  - (Season 1 Episode 1")
  - (Season 1 Episode 2")
- Emerald Point N.A.S. (1983–1984) (13 episodes) as Harlan Adams
- The Hitchhiker (1984) (Season 2 Episode 3: "Face to Face") as Dr. Christopher Hamilton
- The Last Bastion (1984 Australian mini-series) (3 episodes) as Douglas MacArthur
  - (Season 1 Episode 1: Part 1")
  - (Season 1 Episode 2: Part 2")
  - (Season 1 Episode 3: Part 3")
- Private Sessions (1985) (TV movie) as Oliver Coles
- Murder, She Wrote (1985–1992) (3 episodes)
  - (Season 2 Episode 11: "Murder Digs Deep") (1985) as Gideon Armstrong
  - (Season 6 Episode 3: "The Grand Old Lady") (1989) as Edwin Chancellor
  - (Season 8 Episode 12: "The Witch's Curse") (1992) as Charles Winthrop
- Murrow (1986) (Television film) as President Franklin D. Roosevelt
- Stingray (1986) (Season 1 Episode 5: "Abnormal Psych") as Nameless Master Villain
- The A-Team (1986–1987) (13 episodes) as General Hunt Stockwell
- Hunter (1989) (3 episodes) as Deputy Chief Curtis Moorehead
  - (Season 5 Episode 11: "City Under Siege: Part 1")
  - (Season 5 Episode 12: "City Under Siege: Part 2")
  - (Season 5 Episode 13: "City Under Siege: Part 3")
- Dark Avenger (1990) (Television movie) as Commissioner Peter Kinghorn
- Tatort (1992) (German television series) (Episode 254: "Camerone") as Colonel Gavron
- Danger Theatre (1993) (7 episodes) as Host
- Roseanne (1993) (Season 5 Episode 16: "Wait 'Til Your Father Gets Home") as Father Terry
- Kung Fu: The Legend Continues (1993–1994) (2 episodes) as Rykker
  - (Season 1 Episode 18: "Dragonswing") (1993)
  - (Season 2 Episode 19: "Dragonswing II") (1994)
- Escape to Witch Mountain (1995) (Television film) as Edward Bolt
- Dancing In The Dark (1995) (Television film) as Dennis Forbes
- Walker, Texas Ranger (1996) (Season 5 Episode 5: "Plague") as Dr. Stuart Riser
- Diagnosis: Murder (1996–1997) (2 episodes)
  - (Season 3 Episode 11: "Murder Murder") as Bill Stratton
  - (Season 5 Episode 10: "Discards") as Alexander Drake
- The Nanny (1996–1998) (2 episodes) as James Sheffield
  - (Season 4 Episode 6: "Me and Mrs. Joan")
  - (Season 5 Episode 19: "Immaculate Concepcion")
- Law & Order (1997–1998) (3 episodes) as Carl Anderton
  - (Season 8 Episode 9: "Burned") (1997)
  - (Season 8 Episode 21: "Bad Girl") (1998)
  - (Season 8 Episode 24: "Monster) (1998)
- The Magnificent Seven (1998–2000) (6 episodes) as Judge Oren Travis
  - (Season 1 Episode 1: "One Day Out West") (1998)
  - (Season 1 Episode 5: "Nemesis") (1998)
  - (Season 2 Episode 1: "The New Law") (1999)
  - (Season 2 Episode 5: "Wagon Train: Part 1") (1999)
  - (Season 2 Episode 10: "The Trial") (2000)
  - (Season 2 Episode 11: "Lady Killers") (2000)
- Hustle (2004–2012) (48 episodes) as Albert Stroller)
- Law & Order: Special Victims Unit (2006–2015) (2 episodes)
  - (Season 8 Episode 2: "Clock") (2006) as Tate Speer
  - (Season 16 Episode 16: "December Solstice") (2015) as Walter Briggs
- Little Britain USA (2008) (Season 1 Episode 5) as Paul Getty II
- Coronation Street (2012) (13 episodes) as Milton Fanshaw)
