= The Vulcan Affair =

1964 episode of The Man from U.N.C.L.E.

- The Man from U.N.C.L.E. episode
- Episode no.: Season 1 Episode 1
- Directed by: Don Medford
- Written by: Sam Rolfe
- Original air date: September 22, 1964

Episode chronology
← Previous —	Next → "The Iowa-Scuba Affair"

"The Vulcan Affair" is the first episode of the television series The Man from U.N.C.L.E. It was edited from the pilot, "Solo", which was shot in colour, but was broadcast in black-and-white, to conform with the rest of the first season. It was first broadcast in the United States on NBC on September 22, 1964. The hero is Napoleon Solo and his antagonist is Andrew Vulcan, an evil scientist working with THRUSH. The episode was subsequently expanded with additional footage and released in colour as the feature-length movie, To Trap a Spy.

== Synopsis ==
The episode opens with several THRUSH agents raiding the UNCLE headquarters via a covert entrance from the back of a common tailor shop in New York City. They are at first successful, until Napoleon Solo defeats them. A sequence in Solo shows the death of the captured agents due to THRUSH having them take a slow acting poison killing them regardless of the success or failure of their mission.

The raid is discovered to be connected to a deceased UNCLE agent who discovered THRUSH plans to assassinate an African political leader through Andrew Vulcan, a senior THRUSH operative who is a major American industrialist. By investigating Vulcan's past he locates a housewife, Elaine, who was a former university girlfriend of the reclusive Vulcan to aid him. They board an airplane and head to Washington D.C. Once there, they go to a party hosted by Vulcan for the African leader and his two fellow diplomats. There, Elaine flirts with Vulcan to acquire information, and he invites her for a tour of his chemical plant. (He plans to give the African leader and his friends a tour the following day.) Seeing a good espionage chance, she agrees. Leaving the party, Solo is almost killed when his car is booby-trapped by Ghist, but returns to Elaine to recover. The next day, Elaine distracts Vulcan while Solo sneaks into the plant. Vulcan and his men find them and pursue them through the plant. They enter a car and find the African leader inside. In reality, he is complicit in the plan and working with Vulcan; he plans to kill his two fellow diplomats with an explosion at the plant during their tour and allow THRUSH to control their country. Solo and Elaine are captured, and almost killed, but Solo manages to free them and they rescue the two diplomats. The leader and Vulcan are killed in the explosion.

== Production ==
The episode was mostly shot in six days in late November 1963 but some additional footage was shot in three days in the following spring. The director was Don Medford with Maurice Vaccarino assisting and Henry Berman editing. The producer was Norman Felton who had conceived the original idea for the show and then developed it in consultation with the creator of James Bond — Ian Fleming. Sam Rolfe was given the job of writing the detailed background for the series and wrote the script for this episode. The score was composed by Jerry Goldsmith including the theme tune which was performed by The Gallants in a later episode and released as a 45 single.

== Casting ==
This first episode features Napoleon Solo as the eponymous Man from U.N.C.L.E., as the series concept was to focus upon this individual agent as the hero. Robert Vaughn was cast in this role to give the character an urbane, sophisticated style similar to Cary Grant's role in Notorious. The Russian agent, Illya Kuryakin, only has four lines in this episode as the role had yet to attract the attention which it subsequently achieved due to the casting of David McCallum, who was a great favorite of female fans.

The other main regular character appearing is the leader of U.N.C.L.E., Alexander Waverly. He was played by Leo G. Carroll who was cast because he had played a similar avuncular role in North by Northwest. This was, however, a late change. In the pilot, the leadership role was Mr. Allison, played by Will Kuluva. He was removed from the show after an NBC executive ordered that the character whose name started with "K" should go. He had meant Kuryakin, but it was Kuluva who went and the role was reshot with Carroll in the part.

The standard front for U.N.C.L.E. in New York was a tailor's shop. In this first episode, the part of the tailor, Del Floria, was played by Mario Siletti.

Each episode was expected to include an innocent character caught up in the action, as Cary Grant was in North by Northwest. Patricia Crowley filled this role in this episode as housewife Elaine May Bender Donaldson. She had previously played opposite Robert Vaughn as his wife in The Lieutenant and was cast by Norman Felton. Janice Rule was originally considered, but was rejected due to both Vaughn and Rule preferring to be photographed from the left side. The other major guest star was Fritz Weaver, who played the villain Andrew Vulcan.

The episode features William Marshall, Ivan Dixon and Rupert Crosse as three diplomats from a newly independent African nation seeking industrial assistance from the West.

=== Cast ===
- Robert Vaughn as Napoleon Solo
- David McCallum as Illya Kuryakin
- Leo G. Carroll as Alexander Waverly
- Patricia Crowley as Elaine May Donaldson (née Bender)
- Fritz Weaver as Andrew Vulcan
- William Marshall as Sekue Ashuman
- Ivan Dixon as Jean Francis Soumarin
- Victoria Shaw as Gracie Ladovan
- Rupert Crosse as General Molte Nobuk
- Mario Siletti as Del Floria
- Eric Berry as Alfred Ghist
- William Corcoran as Ronny (uncredited)
- Shep Houghton as Mr. Donaldson (uncredited)
- Joyce Taylor as Margaret Oberon (uncredited)
- Richard Kiel as plant worker (uncredited)

== See also ==
- To Trap a Spy
