= The Druid Circle =

1947 play

- Original language: English
- Written by: John Van Druten
- Subject: Middle-aged ire at youthful love.
- Genre: Drama
- Setting: Senior common room; Maddox's flat; White's flat; one week in March, early 1920s

Premiere
- Date: October 22, 1947
- Place: Morosco Theatre
- Directed by: John Van Druten

The Druid Circle is a 1947 play in three acts written by John Van Druten. It has a medium-sized cast, slow pacing, five scenes, and three settings. A history professor, frustrated to be working at a university near the border of England and Wales, discovers a love letter written by one of his students to a girl. After humiliating them both, the Professor realises too late the meanness of his actions when it rebounds on him. The play's title comes from "Druid", British academic slang denoting an erudite scholar who has lost his sense of humanity, with "Circle" indicating a group of the same.

Produced by Alfred de Liagre Jr, staged by the author, with scenic design by Stewart Chaney, it starred Leo G. Carroll. It ran on Broadway from October through December 1947, lasting for sixty-nine or seventy performances.

== Characters ==
Lead

- Professor White is a widower, a middle-aged professor of history at a lesser university.

Supporting

- Maddox is an earnest young lecturer from London, supposedly modelled after the author.
- Tom Lloyd-Ellis is a promising young college student, in love with Megan Lewis.
- Megan Lewis is a young female college student, in love with Tom Lloyd-Ellis.
- Mrs. White is the octogenarian, gossipy, cynical, and nagging mother of Professor White.

Featured

- Miss Dagnall is in her mid-thirties, a teacher but a bit giddy and gossipy.
- Professor Parry Phillips is a desiccated old colleague of White's, and another Druid.
- Tobin is Dean of the college where White teaches at the university.
- Brenda Maddox is a small-time ex-actress, and wife to the lecturer Maddox.
- Miss Trevelyan is a prim headmistress.
- Blodwyn

== Synopsis ==
The locale is a small university on the border of England and Wales, the time is one week in March, during the early 1920s. Professor White has been at the same university since he was a student himself. His marriage had been loveless and his wife had died twenty years ago. Daily contact with the same ossified minds of his colleagues and the atmosphere of petty gossip has worn away whatever ambition or idealism he may have had. He finds himself incensed by the happy home life of the lecturer Maddox, recently come from London with his stylish wife. He is irked by the scholarly promise of a student leader, Tom Lloyd-Ellis, whose popularity he resents. One day he finds a candid letter Tom wrote to his fiance, Megan Lewis, a student in the university's college for women. The letter is both a vicarious delight to White's long-suffocated soul, and a goad since Tom has made slighting reference to White as incapable of the love he expresses for Megan.

White says nothing about the letter, knowing the couple will have missed it and will soon have to come to him. Tom and Megan first seek advice from Maddox and his wife Brenda, who are sympathetic but can only suggest waiting until White reveals his purpose in concealing the letter. Meanwhile, White's aged mother forces him to confront his thwarted career, sacrificing himself at a penurious university with no real academic reputation. When Tom and Megan go to Professor White, he acknowledges having the letter, but won't let them have it until Tom reads it aloud in front of Megan and him. Tom reads it, after which Megan rushes from the room and runs away from the college. This causes an uproar at the university, and the Dean eventually traces the cause to Professor White's cruelty. In the final scenes White feels remorse over his callousness, and resigns at the stern suggestion of the Dean, while Megan returns on her own to be reunited with Tom, and Maddox decides to leave this stultifying institution.

== Original production ==
=== Background ===
John Van Druten had been an instructor at just such a university as figures in The Druid Circle. Though the play wasn't produced until 1947, Van Druten wrote it just after his first success with Young Woodley in 1925. The original title was Professor White, which Van Druten changed to The Druid Circle just before rehearsals started on September 10, 1947.

Alfred de Liagre Jr and Van Druten had worked before on the long-running hit The Voice of the Turtle, and the 1945 play The Mermaids Singing. Financial backing for The Druid Circle was provided by James Merrill Herd through the Herd Theatrical Corporation, which consolidated money from many individuals into a package investment to support theatrical productions.

=== Cast ===
Principal cast for the tryouts in New Haven and Boston, and during the original Broadway run.
Role	Actor	Dates	Notes and sources
Professor White	Leo G. Carroll	Oct 02, 1947 - Dec 20, 1947	
Tom Lloyd-Ellis	Walter Starkey	Oct 02, 1947 - Dec 20, 1947	
Maddox	Boyd Crawford	Oct 02, 1947 - Dec 20, 1947	
Megan Lewis	Ellen Humphrey	Oct 02, 1947 - Oct 11, 1947	
Megan Lewis	Susan Douglas	Oct 13, 1947 - Dec 20, 1947	She replaced Ellen Humphrey starting with the second week of the Boston tryout.
Mrs. White	Ethel Griffies	Oct 02, 1947 - Dec 20, 1947	
Miss Dagnall	Lillian Bronson	Oct 02, 1947 - Dec 20, 1947	
Brenda Maddox	Neva Patterson	Oct 02, 1947 - Dec 20, 1947	
Miss Trevelyan	Merle Maddern	Oct 02, 1947 - Dec 20, 1947	
Professor Phillips	Noel Leslie	Oct 02, 1947 - Dec 20, 1947	
Tobin	Aidan Turner	Oct 02, 1947 - Dec 20, 1947	
Blodwyn	Cherry Hardy	Oct 02, 1947 - Dec 20, 1947	

=== Tryouts ===
The Druid Circle was performed for the first time at the Shubert Theatre in New Haven, Connecticut on October 2, 1947. Local opinion was mixed; reviewer John Innes thought it a good evening's entertainment though carrying no particular message. The critic for the Hartford Courant was less enthusiastic: "The Druid Circle failed to convince this reviewer of its fundamental sincerity. There is a suspicious kind of precociousness about the whole business, a blandness and smirky superiority which are slightly dismaying."

After four performances in New Haven, the production went to Boston, where it opened at the Wilbur Theatre on October 6, 1947. Cyrus Durgin of The Boston Globe was enthusiastic about the acting, particularly Leo G. Carroll, "one of the finest actors of the day". He also praised Van Druten's writing, but noticed some weakness with the play's structure: "The plot is difficult to handle, for it depends in every act on telling about things which have happened off-stage and then going on from there." He praised Ethel Griffies scene-stealing in the second act, and finished by suggesting some reworking of the third act.

George Jean Nathan stated that during the tryouts the time period for the play was 1912, but when going to Broadway it was abruptly switched to the early 1920s. There is nothing in any of the tryout reviews to confirm or deny his assertion of the time period.

=== Premiere and reception ===
The Druid Circle had its Broadway premiere at the Morosco Theatre on October 22, 1947, displacing Van Druten's The Voice of the Turtle, which now moved over to the Martin Beck Theatre. Leo G. Carroll was the only performer listed in advertising, but his name was below the title in smaller font and preceded by "with".

Brooks Atkinson of The New York Times thought the first act "trifling", but once over, "John van Druten goes straight to the heart of one of his best dramas". (Note: Wikipedia has the author's surname as "Van Druten" but many contemporary references cite it, like Atkinson, as "van Druten".) Atkinson's most generous praise was for the acting of Leo G. Carroll, in a role that precluded his usual charm and geniality, and thought Ethel Griffies "another treasure". Arthur Pollock of the Brooklyn Daily Eagle thought The Druid Circle "more of a study than a play", a character sketch of Professor White. He summarized the production by saying "Mr. Van Druten has staged the play as if he were in no hurry to make it a hit".

John Chapman of the New York Daily News disagreed with the critic for the Hartford Courant: "...it is a sincere drama and sometimes a moving one". His only quibble was with the relationship of the young lovers: "...being an incipient member of the Druid Circle, I felt now and again that the young lovers were just a little too starry-eyed, a little too pure of heart and simple of mind for even the 1920s".

=== Closing ===
The Druid Circle closed at the Morosco on December 20, 1947. There was no post-Broadway tour; instead, Leo G. Carroll went right into rehearsals for a Theatre Guild production of You Never Can Tell.

== Bibliography ==
- Gerald Bordman. American Theatre: A Chronicle of Comedy and Drama, 1930-1969. Oxford University Press, 1996.
- George Jean Nathan. The Theater Book of the Year, 1947-1948. Fairleigh Dickinson University Press, 1970.
