= Harlem Detective (TV series) =

TV crime series from 1953-54

- Genre: Police drama
- Created by: Lawrence Menkin.
- Written by: William Attaway
- Directed by: Bob Eberle
- Starring: William Hairston, William Marshall
- Country of origin: United States
- Original language: English
- No. of seasons: 1
- No. of episodes: 14

Production
- Producer: Lawrence Menkin

Original release
- Release: October 14, 1953 – January 13, 1954

Harlem Detective is a short-lived TV series that aired on WOR in 1953 and 1954. It is the first television crime program with an interracial pair of detectives, and the first program with an interracial cast. The show was created by Lawrence Menkin and starred William Hairston and William Marshall, among others.

Although debuting to high ratings despite a low budget, the show was quickly cancelled. The producers stated the cancellation was because Marshall was being released to "fulfill movie commitments," however Marshall claimed it was actually because of his political beliefs — he was accused of being a communist and placed on the Hollywood Blacklist.

Several episodes were written by African American script editor William Attaway
