= To Trap a Spy =

1964 film by Don Medford

- Directed by: Don Medford
- Written by: Sam Rolfe
- Produced by: Norman Felton
- Starring: Robert Vaughn; David McCallum; Luciana Paluzzi
- Cinematography: Joseph Biroc
- Edited by: Henry Berman
- Music by: Jerry Goldsmith
- Production company: Arena Productions
- Distributed by: Metro-Goldwyn-Mayer
- Release date: January 19, 1966 (US)
- Running time: 92 minutes
- Country: United States
- Language: English

To Trap a Spy is the feature-length film version of the 70-minute television pilot of The Man from U.N.C.L.E. starring Robert Vaughn. It also features Patricia Crowley, William Marshall, Fritz Weaver and David McCallum. The film was directed by Don Medford.

== Plot ==
U.N.C.L.E. suspects that the U.S. industrialist and tycoon Andrew Vulcan, an officer of WASP (an international criminal organization), plans to kill Prime Minister Sekue Ashumen of the newly independent African nation of Western Natumba. Napoleon Solo is assigned by Mr. Allison, the head of U.N.C.L.E., to thwart the assassination and find out why it was planned. Solo thereafter recruits Elaine May Donaldson, a college girlfriend of Vulcan's and who is now a suburban housewife, to help get information from Vulcan on his plans. Solo's thought is that only a personal connection can obtain the information, and Vulcan has neither wife nor close friends.

Elaine is given the cover story of being a wealthy widow and is able to not only get Solo the details of the assassination plot, but drugs Ashumen so he is unable to take the tour of Vulcan’s factory which Solo believes will result in Ashumen’s death. Vulcan’s target, though, turns out to be two of Ashumen’s ministers who do not agree with his plans for having Vulcan set up factories in his country. With Ashumen as Premier and Vulcan running the primary industry there, Western Natumba would become a puppet nation of WASP.

After a run-in (and brief romantic tryst) with WASP agent Angela, Solo finds out the truth, is captured along with Elaine, and left to die in what is supposed to look like an industrial accident. Solo and Elaine escape, rescue the ministers, and Ashumen and Vulcan die instead in the “accident” they themselves set up. Elaine is returned to her normal life, which she appreciates all the more after the excitement and danger of an U.N.C.L.E. adventure.

== Cast ==
- Robert Vaughn as Napoleon Solo
- Luciana Paluzzi as Angela
- Pat Crowley as Elaine May Bender Donaldson
- Fritz Weaver as Andrew Vulcan
- William Marshall as Sekue Ashumen
- Will Kuluva as Mr. Allison
- David McCallum as Illya Kuryakin
- Ivan Dixon as Jean Francis Soumarin
- Victoria Shaw as Gracie Ladovan
- Eric Berry as Alfred Ghist
- Rupert Crosse as Nobuk
- Billy Corcoran as Ronny
- Richard Kiel as Guard (Uncredited)

== Production ==
To Trap a Spy is the third and longest version of the same story, in this case, the pilot known as "The Vulcan Affair". The original The Man from U.N.C.L.E. pilot "Solo" was filmed in color and, as was standard at the time for U.S. network television shows, shown primarily to network executives to gain their approval for a series, and if not picked up for filming, released as a second feature. After the series was ordered, the pilot episode was edited down to fit a one-hour timeslot, modified somewhat to – among other minor changes – substitute Leo G. Carroll's character Alexander Waverly for that of Mr. Allison (played by Will Kuluva), and broadcast in black-and-white (as was the rest of the first season of the show).

The film version started with the color pilot footage, added in additional footage and subplots (also in color, and including a new subplot featuring the actress Luciana Paluzzi), and was first released in Hong Kong in late 1964 and later shown in the U.S. as a double feature with The Spy with My Face in early 1966. In the UK it was originally released as a support feature to the James Garner/Julie Andrews comedy The Americanization of Emily in 1965, and its release coincided with the broadcast of the series. However, episodes of the series edited into feature films were not shown on non-American television screenings. It later appeared as a top billed feature in many cinemas.

== See also ==
- List of American films of 1964
