= The Spy with My Face =

- Directed by: John Newland
- Screenplay by: Joseph Calvelli; Clyde Ware
- Story by: Clyde Ware
- Produced by: Sam Rolfe
- Starring: Robert Vaughn; Senta Berger; David McCallum
- Cinematography: Fred J. Koenekamp
- Edited by: Joseph Dervin
- Music by: Morton Stevens
- Production company: Arena Productions
- Distributed by: Metro-Goldwyn-Mayer
- Release dates: August 16, 1965 (UK); March 9, 1966 (US)
- Running time: 86 minutes (UK); 88 minutes (US)
- Country: United States
- Language: English

The Spy with My Face is a 1965 spy-fi spy film based on The Man from U.N.C.L.E. television series. Robert Vaughn and David McCallum reprised their roles as secret agents Napoleon Solo and Illya Kuryakin respectively. The film follows the villainous organization THRUSH, which tries to steal a super weapon by substituting a double for Napoleon Solo. The film was directed by John Newland.

It is the second U.N.C.L.E. film, consisting of the November 1964 TV episode "The Double Affair" and additional footage. The film was released to theaters in the United States in 1966 as a double feature with To Trap a Spy. Alpine sequences were filmed at the Griffith Park Observatory in California. Sequences added to the original "The Double Affair" for a feature were reused in "The Four-Steps Affair" and "The Dippy Blonde Affair" episodes of the series.

== Plot ==
Alexander Waverly gives U.N.C.L.E. agents Napoleon Solo, Illya Kuryakin, Arsene Coria from Italy, and Namana from Liberia their assignment: they are to take a top secret code to a hidden location. After they leave, Waverly sends another agent, Australian Kitt Kittridge, to follow them without their knowledge.

However, THRUSH has gotten wind of the "August Affair", though the villains know little more than the name of the operation. They send Serena to entice Solo to her apartment. After each unsuccessfully tries to find out what the other is after, he is gassed into unconsciousness and a THRUSH agent, surgically altered to look and sound like Solo, takes his place. An attempt is made to kill Kuryakin to minimize the chance of the substitution being detected, but it fails.

Aboard a jet liner, the fake Solo manages to open the briefcase and photograph the code, but doesn't realize that a loose button from his jacket has fallen into the case. Kittridge greets his old comrade (from Solo's prior mission) and makes the mistake of saying that his instincts are telling him that there is something wrong with Solo, forcing the double to kill him. Solo tells Kuryakin that Kittridge was a THRUSH assassin. Solo's latest girlfriend, stewardess Sandy Wister, is miffed that he acts as if he does not know her, but makes no fuss.

When the agents reach their destination, a secret, heavily guarded underground vault in the Swiss Alps, they are told what is inside. Project Earth Save is a super weapon, designed by scientists from many nations because possible signs of an alien attack had been detected. The weapon is so deadly, even the sight of it is fatal, so they have to wear goggles. The code they have brought opens the vault, and is changed every year in August. When Namana spots Solo's missing jacket button in the briefcase, the fake Solo rips off Namana's goggles before he can warn anyone; the African agent is mesmerized by the weapon and stumbles into the vault to die.

Meanwhile, the real Solo is kept prisoner not far away. He escapes, killing the head agent Darius Two in the process, and heads for the vault. The double and Serena intercept him on the highway. When U.N.C.L.E. agents drive up, Serena shoots the fake Solo. Afterwards, she talks Solo into letting her go to return the favor.

== Cast ==
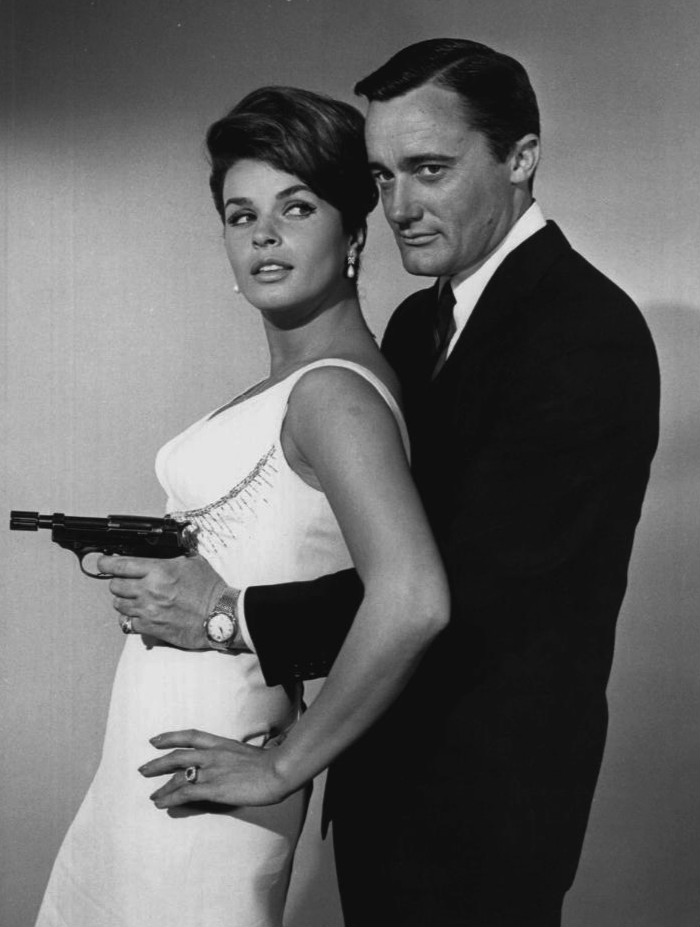
Photo of Senta Berger and Robert Vaughn

- Robert Vaughn as Napoleon Solo
- Senta Berger as Serena
- David McCallum as Illya Kuryakin
- Leo G. Carroll as Alexander Waverly
- Michael Evans as Darius Two, the head THRUSH agent
- Sharon Farrell as Sandy Wister
- Fabrizio Mioni as Arsene Coria
- Don Harron as Kitt Kittridge
- Bill Gunn as Namana
- Jennifer Billingsley as Taffy, Sandy's friend and fellow stewardess
- Paula Raymond as Director
- Donna Michelle as Nina
- Harold Gould as Doctor, who operated on Solo's double

== Production and release ==
Filming for both The Man from U.N.C.L.E. episode "The Double Affair" and the movie began in August 1964. All the scenes were filmed in color, although the television version was broadcast in black-and-white. The movie premiered in London in August 1965. The film was advertised in the U.K. as a Mr. Solo adventure rather than a tie-in to The Man from U.N.C.L.E., but during its two-month run, the series became a top-rated show in the U.K. The film was released on DVD on August 23, 2011 by Warner Bros.

== See also ==
- List of American films of 1965
