= The Karate Killers =

- Directed by: Barry Shear
- Screenplay by: Norman Hudis
- Story by: Boris Ingster
- Produced by: Boris Ingster
- Starring: Robert Vaughn; David McCallum; Curd Jürgens; Herbert Lom; Telly Savalas; Terry-Thomas; Leo G. Carroll; Joan Crawford
- Cinematography: Fred Koenekamp
- Edited by: William B. Gulick
- Music by: Gerald Fried
- Production company: Metro-Goldwyn-Mayer
- Distributed by: Metro-Goldwyn-Mayer
- Release dates: July 22, 1967 (Tokyo); August 3, 1967 (London)
- Running time: 92 Min.
- Country: United States
- Language: English

The Karate Killers is a 1967 American spy film and feature-length film version of The Man from U.N.C.L.E.'s third season two-part episode "The Five Daughters Affair". The episodes were originally broadcast in the United States on March 31, 1967, and April 7, 1967, on NBC. It, as does the television series, stars Robert Vaughn and David McCallum. It is the sixth such feature film that used as its basis a reedited version of one or more episodes from the series. Joan Crawford, Telly Savalas, Herbert Lom, Diane McBain, Jill Ireland and Kim Darby are among those in the cast. The film was directed by Barry Shear and written by Norman Hudis with the story by Boris Ingster.

== Plot ==
On their way to see scientist Dr. Simon True, U.N.C.L.E. agents Napoleon Solo and Illya Kuryakin are attacked by members of the THRUSH organization. Dr. True has discovered a process to extract gold from sea water. Fearing theft, he hid the formula, saying someone would have to “hunt down the four winds” to find it. But during his presentation of the process to U.N.C.L.E., he dies, having been poisoned by THRUSH operative Randolph. True's dying words are that his daughter is the key to finding the formula.

Dr. True, however, turns out to have four step-daughters and one biological daughter, Sandy True. He sent each of his four step-daughters something that, when assembled, will mean something to Sandy and from which the formula can be discovered.

Dr. True's widow, Amanda was having a love affair with Randolph, but he was only using her to get closer to Dr. True's notes and formula. With no further use for her, Randolph orders her murdered by THRUSH. Finding her body, Solo and Kuryakin recruit Sandy to come with them as they find her step-sisters.

First, Solo and Kuryakin visit Rome in search of Margo, who has married Count Valeriano De Fanzini. The Count is keeping Margo naked and captive in his ancestral home, having married her for money only to learn she had none. Solo and Kuryakin rescue Margo and, aided by Sandy, fight with Randolph and other THRUSH agents (who have followed them to Rome). The Count and Margo reconcile after Sandy's discovery of a hidden treasure and give the U.N.C.L.E. team the only thing that Dr. True has sent Margo of late: a photograph of himself with a formula.

After an analysis by U.N.C.L.E., the agents conclude that it is one-quarter of the full formula. They next head to London, where Sandy's step-sister Imogen Smythe was arrested by for indecent exposure (a bikini). Solo posts bail and they go to Imogen's nightclub, fight again with Randolph and THRUSH agents, then are saved by constables, one of whom is enamored with Imogen. Sandy discovers a similar photo of her father in Imogen's dressing room, but with a different formula in the background.

The team then heads to the Swiss Alps, where step-sister Yvonne lives in a hotel but is behind in paying her bills. Randolph, having gotten there before U.N.C.L.E., pays her debt and requests she give him the photo of her step-father. Solo and Kuryakin fight THRUSH agents on skis, and Sandy finds the photo before anyone else. Yvonne and wealthy boyfriend Carl von Kessen resolve an argument and make up. Randolph intercepts the team on an U.N.C.L.E. private jet, takes the three photos, then parachutes out leaving the rest to die. Sandy escapes her bonds and frees the two agents, who land the plane safely.

Dr. True's fourth photo has been published in a magazine. However, scientifically, they still make no sense. When the letters in the formulas are rearranged, they spell “Japanese Lullaby”. She eventually remembers a Japanese man who sang her lullabies as a child. THRUSH later kidnaps Sandy and transport her to Japan.

In Japan, Sandy escapes from THRUSH, aided by geishas. Aided by Solo and Kuryakin, Sandy finds the Japanese man, who gives Sandy the formula that her father sent him for safekeeping. At that moment, Randolph and other THRUSH agents, who have followed them again, overpower the team and take the formula.

Randolph takes the three to the THRUSH central facility at one of the Poles, which serves as their main research and manufacturing station. The facility has been reconfigured to use Dr. True's process and manufacture gold from sea water. Randolph wants to keep the captives alive long enough for them to see THRUSH's success, but Solo and Kuryakin escape from their cell using explosives hidden in Solo's shoelaces. They sabotage the plant and destroy the gold-making machinery. Randolph is killed in the process and covered in a film of gold dust.

Solo, Kuryakin, Sandy, geisha Reikko, and the head of U.N.C.L.E., Alexander Waverly, all travel to London to attend the double wedding of Imogen and the constable, and Yvonne and Carl. The Count and Contessa are also in attendance and we learn that that, absent a father, the girls' “U.N.C.L.E.” has paid for the weddings.

== Cast ==
- Robert Vaughn as Napoleon Solo
- David McCallum as Illya Kuryakin
- Leo G. Carroll as Alexander Waverly
- Kim Darby as Sandy True
- Herbert Lom as Randolph
- Joan Crawford as Amanda True
- Telly Savalas as Count Valeriano De Fanzini
- Diane McBain as Contessa Margo De Fanzini
- Jill Ireland as Imogen Smythe
- Terry-Thomas as Constable
- Danielle De Metz as Yvonne
- Curt Jürgens as Carl von Kessen
- Jim Boles as Dr. Simon True
- Irene Tsu as Reikko
- Rick Traeger as Hotel Clerk
- Julie Ann Johnson as U.N.C.L.E. Girl
- Sharyn Hillyer as U.N.C.L.E. Girl
- Dick Crockett as Karate Killer
- Paul Baxley as Karate Killer

== Production ==
The first four The Man from U.N.C.L.E. feature films made significant changes and additions to the episodes from which they were drawn. This movie, like the one immediately before it, The Spy in the Green Hat, makes relatively minimal changes to the episodes. No major scenes were added or removed, but various trims were made to fit the episodes into the running time of the film and musical cues and accompanying music were sometimes changed.

Also changed were some short scenes that became more violent or sexy than generally shown on American network television at the time. For example, both the dead bodies of Amanda True (Joan Crawford) and Randolph (Herbert Lom) are shown with eyes closed in the TV episode; in the movie, their eyes are open and Randolph's death is more brutal. In some fight scenes, the movie version contains more violent images compared to the episodes (e.g., a bloody face in the London bar, greater violence in the Japanese temple). Margo De Fanzini (Diane McBain)'s initial nudity is seen in both versions, but is more pronounced in the movie.

Other changes were made for apparently no reason other than artistic. For example: there is a scene that is essentially identical in both the episode and the movie, but while in the episode, Reikko (Irene Tsu) calls Sandy True (Kim Darby) “kid”, in the movie, she calls her “teeny-bopper”.

== Music ==
Like One of Our Spies Is Missing, the film also required a new score (by Gerald Fried) due to "The Five Daughters Affair" being tracked with music from other episodes.

The band Every Mother's Son’s song "Come on Down to My Boat", which went to #6 on the Billboard Hot 100 chart in July 1967, is used in both the opening credits to the film and in a London nightclub as a fight breaks out. The televised version of the story only had the band in the nightclub, and images of the band playing the song over the credits in the movie were simply copies of the nightclub scenes.

== Release ==
The episodes were originally broadcast in the United States on March 31, 1967, and April 7, 1967, on NBC. The Karate Killers was released on DVD by Warner Archive Collection on November 2, 2011.

== See also ==
- List of American films of 1967
