= William Marshall (actor) =

American actor, director, and opera singer (1924–2003)

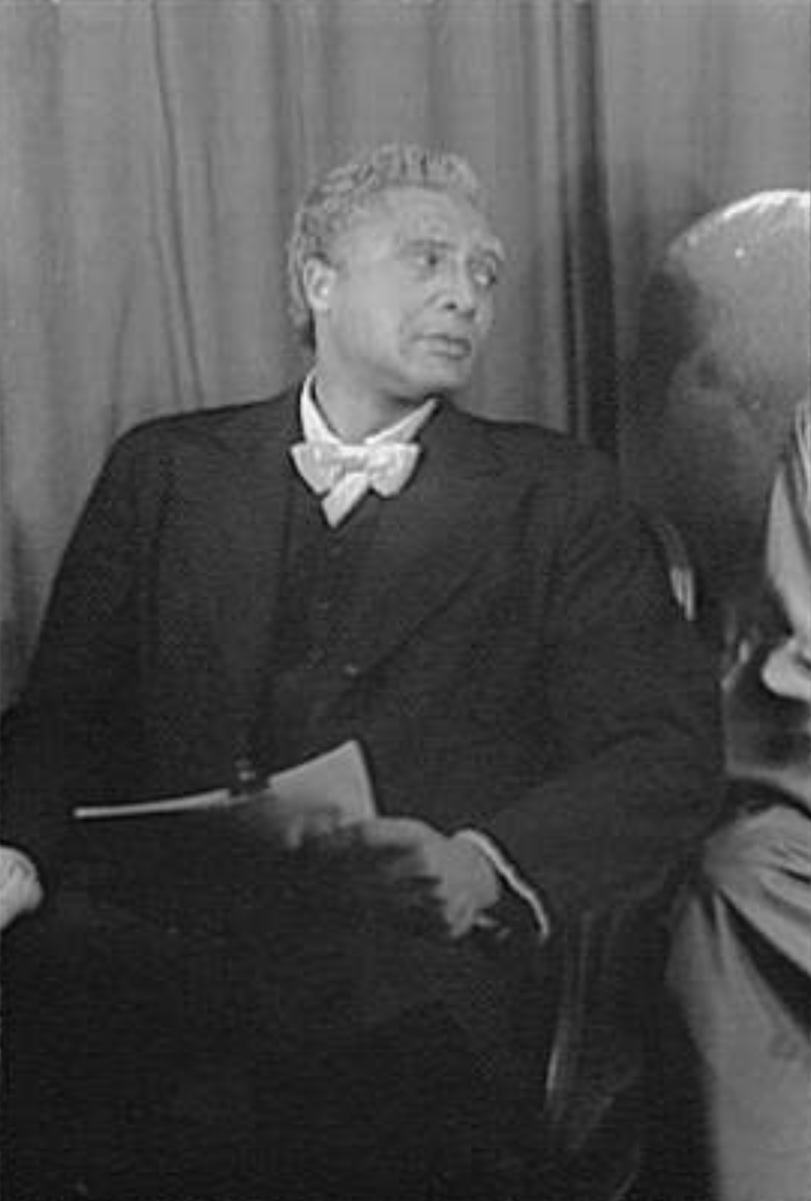
- Marshall in 1951
- Born: William Horace Marshall; August 19, 1924; Gary, Indiana, U.S.
- Died: June 11, 2003 (aged 78); Los Angeles, California, U.S.
- Occupation: Actor
- Years active: 1944–1996
- Children: 4
- Awards: Emmy Award (1974)

William Horace Marshall (August 19, 1924 – June 11, 2003) was an American actor, director and opera singer. He played the title role in the 1972 blaxploitation classic Blacula and its 1973 sequel Scream Blacula Scream. He has appeared as the King of Cartoons on the 1980s television show Pee-wee's Playhouse, as Dr. Richard Daystrom on the television series Star Trek, and as Thomas Bowers on the television series Bonanza. He was 6‘5” (1.96 m) tall and was known for his bass voice.

== Biography ==
=== Early life ===
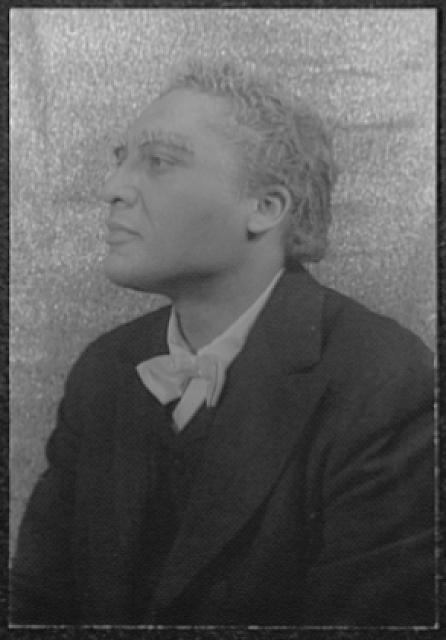
William Marshall as De Lawd in The Green Pastures (1951)

Marshall was born in Gary, Indiana, to Vereen Marshall, a dentist, and Thelma (née Edwards).

He attended New York University as an art student but transferred to the Actors Studio to study theater. He studied at the American Theatre Wing and with Sanford Meisner at the Neighborhood Playhouse.

=== Career ===
Marshall made his Broadway debut in 1944 in Carmen Jones. In 1950, he understudied Boris Karloff as Captain Hook in the Broadway production of Peter Pan. He played the leading role of De Lawd in the 1951 revival of The Green Pastures, a role he repeated in 1958 in a BBC telecast of the play. He performed in several Shakespearean plays on the stage in the U. S. and Europe, including the title role in at least six productions of Othello. Harold Hobson of the London Sunday Times praised Marshall's portrayal as "the best Othello of our time."

In 1968, Marshall joined the Center Theatre Group at the Ahmanson Theatre in Los Angeles to play Othello in a jazz musical version, Catch My Soul, with Jerry Lee Lewis as Iago.

Marshall portrayed Paul Robeson and Frederick Douglass on stage. He researched Douglass's life extensively, and in 1983 produced and played the lead role in Frederick Douglass: Slave and Statesman.

=== Film and television career ===
Marshall's career on screen began in the 1952 film Lydia Bailey as a Haitian leader for 20th Century Fox. He followed that with a prominent role as Glycon, comrade and fellow gladiator to Victor Mature in the 1954 Fox film Demetrius and the Gladiators. His demeanor, voice and stature gave him a wide range, though he was ill-suited for the subservient roles that many black actors of his generation were most frequently offered. He was a leader of the Mau-Mau uprising in Something of Value (1957), and Attorney General Edward Brooke in The Boston Strangler (1968). He was arguably most known for his role in the 1972 vampire film Blacula and its 1973 sequel Scream Blacula Scream.

In the early 1950s, Marshall starred briefly in Harlem Detective, a series about black police officers. The show was canceled when Marshall was named as a communist in the anti-communist newsletter Counterattack.

Despite blacklisting because of his supposed communist connections, Marshall continued to appear in both television and films. He appeared on the British spy series Danger Man in episodes titled "Deadline" (1962) and "The Galloping Major" (1964). Marshall played the role of traveling opera singer Thomas Bowers in the 1964 Bonanza episode "Enter Thomas Bowers," and that same year he appeared, with actor Ivan Dixon, as the leader of a newly independent African nation and as a T.H.R.U.S.H. agent in the television pilot Solo, that became the first-season episode of The Man from U.N.C.L.E. entitled The Vulcan Affair. It was released cinematically as To Trap a Spy. He also appeared on the 1964 Rawhide episode "Incident at Seven Fingers" where he played a Buffalo Soldier.

In 1968, he appeared as Dr. Richard Daystrom in the Star Trek episode "The Ultimate Computer". In 1969, he had a special guest appearance as the character Amalek in an episode of The Wild Wild West entitled "The Night of the Egyptian Queen". He reprised his Othello persona in 1979 on Steve Allen's "Meeting of the Minds".

He won two local Emmys for producing and performing in a PBS production, As Adam Early in the Morning, a theatre piece originally performed on stage. He also was featured in an episode of The Alfred Hitchcock Hour titled, "The Jar", with actors Pat Buttram and George Lindsey.

Marshall played the King of Cartoons on Pee-wee's Playhouse, replacing actor Gilbert Lewis, during the 1980s.

In 1985, guest starred on Benson as Mr. Reaper (death) season 7, episode 4 "The Stranger".

=== Later life and death ===
In addition to acting and producing, Marshall taught acting at various universities including the University of California, Irvine, and the Mafundi Institute, an African-American arts and music institution in the Watts section of Los Angeles. He did similar work at Chicago's ETA Creative Arts Foundation, which in 1992 named Marshall one of its Epic Men of the 20th century.

For 42 years, Marshall was the partner of Sylvia Gussin Jarrico, former wife of blacklisted screenwriter Paul Jarrico. Marshall died on June 11, 2003, from complications arising from Alzheimer's disease and diabetes. He was survived by sons Tariq, Malcolm, and Claude Marshall and daughter Gina Loring. Eulogists at his funeral included Sidney Poitier, Ivan Dixon, Paul Winfield, and Marla Gibbs.

=== Awards ===
In 1974, Marshall won two local Emmys for producing and performing in a PBS production, As Adam Early in the Morning, a theatre piece originally performed on stage.

=== Filmography ===
- Lydia Bailey (1952) – King Dick
- Demetrius and the Gladiators (1954) – Glycon
- Something of Value (1957) – Leader, Intellectual in Suit
- Sabu and the Magic Ring (1957) – Ubal, the genie
- La fille de feu (1958) – Stork
- The Big Pride (1961) – Sutlej
- Piedra de toque (1963) – African Missionary (uncredited)
- The Alfred Hitchcock Hour (1964) (Season 2 Episode 17: "The Jar") – Jahdoo
- To Trap a Spy (1964) – Sekue Ashumen
- Bonanza (TV) (1964) Season 5 episode 30 ("Enter Thomas Bowers") – Thomas Bowers
- Ben Casey (TV) (1965) Season 4 episode 14 : Dr. Henry Wellick
- Star Trek (TV) (1967) Season 2 episode 24 ("The Ultimate Computer") – Doctor Daystrom
- The Hell with Heroes (1968) – Al Poland
- The Boston Strangler (1968) – Attorney General Edward W. Brooke
- Skullduggery (1970) – Attorney General
- The Mask of Sheba (1970) – Captain Condor Sekallie
- Zig Zag (1970) – Morris Bronson
- Honky (1971) – Dr. Craig Smith
- Blacula (1972) – Blacula / Mamuwalde
- Scream Blacula Scream (1973) – Blacula / Mamuwalde
- Abby (1974) – Bishop Garnet Williams
- Twilight's Last Gleaming (1977) – William Klinger, Attorney General
- The Great Skycopter Rescue (1980) – Mr. Jason
- The Tragedy of Othello (1981) – Othello
- Vasectomy: A Delicate Matter (1986) – Dr. Dean
- Amazon Women on the Moon (1987) – Pirate Captain (segment "Video Pirates")
- Pee-wee's Playhouse (1987–1990) – King of Cartoons
- Maverick (1994) – Riverboat Poker Player #10
- Sorceress (1995) – John Geiger
- Dinosaur Valley Girls (1996) – Dr. Benjamin Michaels

Preceded by John Vernon	Voice of Iron Man; 1981	Succeeded by Robert Hays
