= Leo G. Carroll =

English actor (1886–1972)

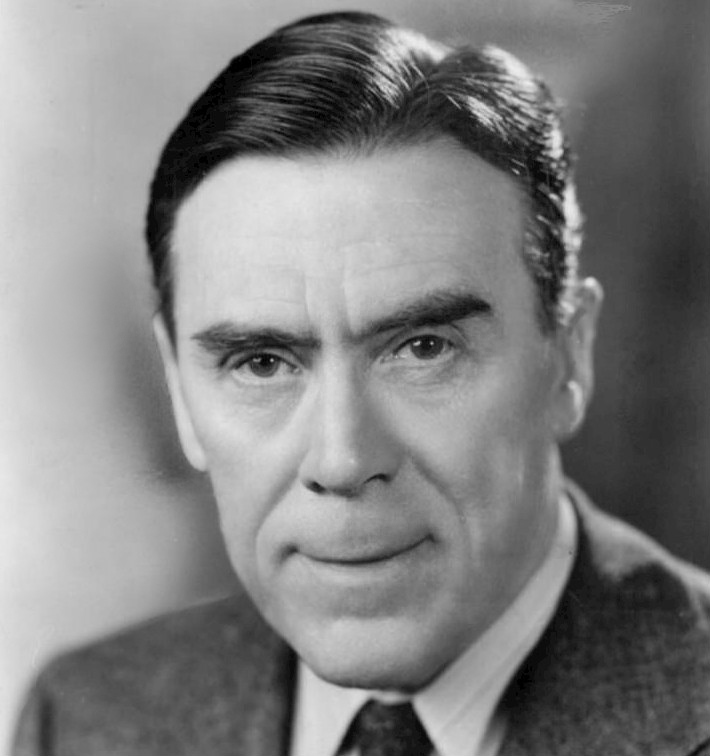
- Carroll in 1951
- Born: Leo Grattan Carroll; 25 October 1886; Weedon Bec, Northamptonshire, England
- Died: 16 October 1972 (aged 85); Hollywood, California, U.S.
- Resting place: Grand View Memorial Park Cemetery in Glendale, California
- Other name: Leo Carroll
- Occupation: Actor
- Years active: 1912–1914; 1919–1972
- Spouse: Edith Nancy de Silva Carroll (m. 1926)
- Children: 1

Leo Grattan Carroll (25 October 1886 – 16 October 1972) was an English actor. In a career of more than 40 years, he appeared in six Hitchcock films including Spellbound, Strangers on a Train and North by Northwest and in three television series, Topper, Going My Way, and The Man from U.N.C.L.E.

== Early life ==
Carroll was born in Weedon Bec, Northamptonshire, to William and Catherine Carroll. His Roman Catholic parents named him after then-Pope Leo XIII. In 1897, his family lived in York, where his Irish-born father was a foreman in an ordnance store. In the 1901 census for West Ham, Essex, his occupation is listed as "wine trade clerk". In the 1911 census, he is living at the same address and described as a "dramatic agent".

== Stage career ==
Carroll made his stage debut in 1912. His acting career was on hold during the First World War, when he served in the British Army as a Lieutenant in the London Regiment. Carroll saw action in France, Salonika, and Palestine during the war; he was badly wounded while serving in the last. After his recovery and discharge, he again took up acting in December 1919.

He then performed in London and on Broadway. His American stage debut came in The Vortex. In 1933, he was a member of the Manhattan Theatre Repertory Company in the inaugural season of the Ogunquit Playhouse in Ogunquit, Maine.

During 1933–34, Carroll had the role of "impeccable valet" Trump in the Broadway play The Green Bay Tree (which has no relation to the novel by Louis Bromfield apart from the shared title), and in 1941 starred with Vincent Price and Judith Evelyn in Patrick Hamilton's Angel Street (better known as Gaslight), which ran for three years at the Golden Theatre on West 45th Street in New York City.

After the production closed, he starred in the title role in John P. Marquand's The Late George Apley. In 1947 he starred in John Van Druten's The Druid Circle at the Morosco Theatre.

== Films and television ==
Carroll, who had moved to Hollywood, made his film debut in Sadie McKee (1934), as Finnegan Phelps, starring (Joan Crawford). He often played doctors or butlers, but he made appearances as Marley's ghost in A Christmas Carol (1938) and as Joseph in Wuthering Heights (1939). He appeared in two Charlie Chan films, City in Darkness (1939) as a shady French locksmith, followed by a role in Charlie Chan's Murder Cruise (1940) as a passenger on a ship. In the original version of Father of the Bride (1950), he played an unctuous wedding caterer. In the 1951 film The Desert Fox: The Story of Rommel he played a sympathetic German field marshal, Gerd von Rundstedt, presenting him as a tragic, resigned figure completely disillusioned with Hitler.

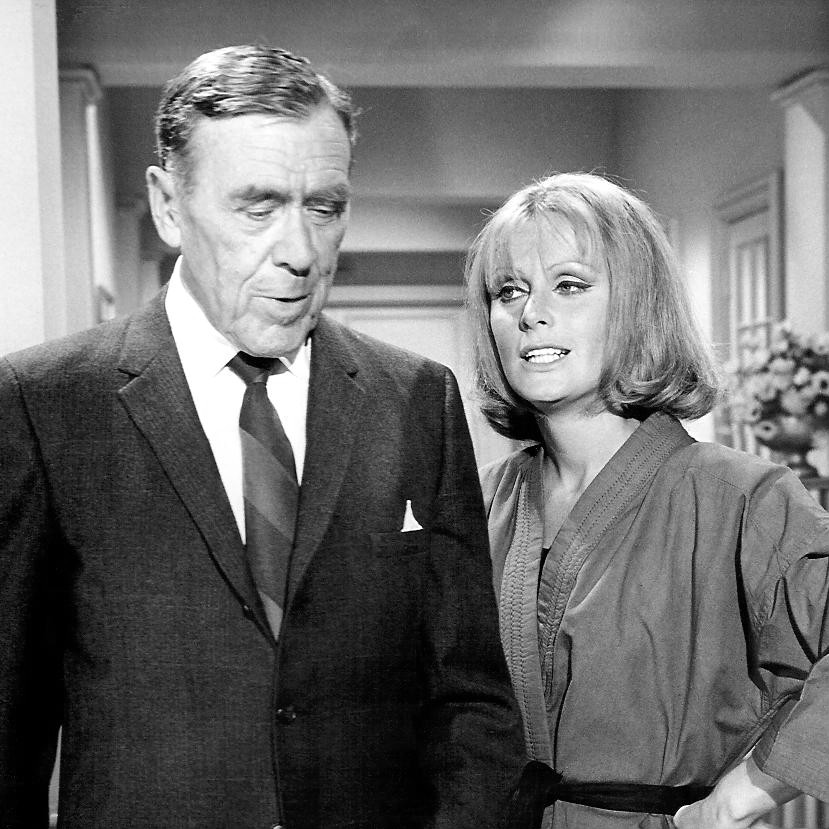
Carroll as Alexander Waverly on The Man from U.N.C.L.E., with guest star Diana Hyland.

Carroll had roles in six Alfred Hitchcock films: Rebecca (1940), Suspicion (1941), Spellbound (1945), The Paradine Case (1947), Strangers on a Train (1951) and North by Northwest (1959). He appeared in more Hitchcock films than anyone other than Clare Greet (1871–1939) (who appeared in seven) and Hitchcock himself, whose cameos were a trademark. As with earlier roles, he was often cast as doctors or other authority figures (such as the spymaster "Professor" in North by Northwest). Carroll eventually played a character based on Hitchcock himself in The Bad and the Beautiful (1952).

Carroll had a central role in the film We're No Angels (1955) with Humphrey Bogart, Peter Ustinov and Basil Rathbone, among others.

In addition to appearing as Rev. Mosby with actress Hayley Mills in The Parent Trap (1961), Carroll is remembered for his role as the frustrated banker haunted by the ghosts of George and Marion Kerby in the television series Topper (1953–1956), with co-stars Anne Jeffreys, Robert Sterling and Lee Patrick. He appeared as the older Father Fitzgibbon from 1962 to 1963 in ABC's Going My Way, a series about two Roman Catholic priests at St. Dominic's parish in New York City. In 1963–1964, he portrayed John Miller in Channing on ABC.

Carroll subsequently gained national recognition as spymaster Alexander Waverly on The Man from U.N.C.L.E. (1964–1968). Several U.N.C.L.E. films were derived from the series, and a spin-off television series, The Girl from U.N.C.L.E. in 1966. He was one of the first actors to appear in two different television series as the same character.

Carroll appeared in spots on the first two regular episodes of Rowan & Martin's Laugh-In, the series that replaced U.N.C.L.E., and appears as Mr. Waverly in the first episode party scene where he is seen using a pen communicator to call Kuryakin to report that he believes he has found THRUSH headquarters.

== Death ==
In 1972, Carroll died aged 85 in Hollywood, following a long illness. He is interred at the Grand View Memorial Park Cemetery in Glendale, California.

== Selected filmography ==
Year	Film	Role	Director	Notes
1934	Sadie McKee	Phelps Finnegan	Clarence Brown	
1934	Stamboul Quest	Kruger, #117 aka Bertram Church	Sam Wood; Jack Conway (uncredited)	Uncredited
1934	The Barretts of Wimpole Street	Dr. Ford-Waterlow	Sidney Franklin	
1934	Outcast Lady	Dr. Masters	Robert Z. Leonard	
1935	Clive of India	Mr. Manning	Richard Boleslawski	
1935	The Right to Live	Dr. Harvester	William Keighley	
1935	Murder on a Honeymoon	Joseph B. Tate	Lloyd Corrigan	
1935	The Casino Murder Case	Smith	Edwin L. Marin	
1936	The Man I Marry	Mr. Furthermore	Ralph Murphy	Uncredited
1937	Captains Courageous	Burns	Victor Fleming	Uncredited
1937	London by Night	Correy	Wilhelm Thiele	
1938	A Christmas Carol	Marley's Ghost	Edwin L. Marin	
1939	Bulldog Drummond's Secret Police	Henry Seaton	James P. Hogan	
1939	Wuthering Heights	Joseph	William Wyler	
1939	The Private Lives of Elizabeth and Essex	Sir Edward Coke	Michael Curtiz	
1939	Tower of London	Lord Hastings	Rowland V. Lee	
1939	Charlie Chan in City in Darkness	Louis Santelle	Herbert I. Leeds	
1940	Charlie Chan's Murder Cruise	Professor Gordon	Eugene Forde	
1940	Waterloo Bridge	Policeman	Mervyn LeRoy	Uncredited
1940	Rebecca	Dr. Baker	Alfred Hitchcock	
1941	Scotland Yard	Craven	Norman Foster	
1941	This Woman Is Mine	Angus 'Sandy' McKay	Frank Lloyd	
1941	Bahama Passage	Delbridge	Edward H. Griffith	
1941	Suspicion	Captain Melbeck	Alfred Hitchcock	
1945	The House on 92nd Street	Col. Hammersohn	Henry Hathaway	
1945	Spellbound	Dr. Murchison	Alfred Hitchcock	
1947	Time Out of Mind	Capt. Fortune	Robert Siodmak	
1947	Song of Love	Professor Wieck	Clarence Brown	
1947	The Paradine Case	Sir Joseph	Alfred Hitchcock	
1947	Forever Amber	Matt Goodgroome	Otto Preminger	
1948	So Evil My Love	Jarvis	Lewis Allen	
1948	Enchantment	Proutie	Irving Reis	
1950	Father of the Bride	Mr. Massoula	Vincente Minnelli	
1950	The Happy Years	The Old Roman	William Wellman	
1951	The First Legion	Father Rector Paul Duquesne	Douglas Sirk	
1951	The Desert Fox	Field Marshal Gerd von Rundstedt	Henry Hathaway	
1951	Strangers on a Train	Sen. Morton	Alfred Hitchcock	
1952	The Snows of Kilimanjaro	Uncle Bill	Henry King	
1952	The Bad and the Beautiful	Henry Whitfield	Vincente Minnelli	
1953	Treasure of the Golden Condor	Raoul Dondel	Delmer Daves	
1953	Rogue's March	Col. Henry Lenbridge	Geoffrey Barkas	
1953	Young Bess	Mr. Mums	George Sidney	
1955	We're No Angels	Felix Ducotel	Michael Curtiz	
1955	Tarantula	Prof. Gerald Deemer	Jack Arnold	
1956	The Swan	Caesar	Charles Vidor	
1959	North by Northwest	the Professor	Alfred Hitchcock	
1961	The Parent Trap	Rev. Dr. Mosby	David Swift	
1961	1+1 (Exploring the Kinsey Report)	Professor Logan	Arch Oboler	
1963	The Prize	Count Bertil Jacobsson	Mark Robson	
1965	That Funny Feeling	O'Shea	Richard Thorpe	
1968	From Nashville with Music	Arnold	Eddie Crandall, Robert Patrick	

=== The Man from U.N.C.L.E. ===
- To Trap a Spy (1964)
- The Spy with My Face (1965)
- One Spy Too Many (1966)
- One of Our Spies Is Missing (1966)
- The Spy in the Green Hat (1967)
- The Karate Killers (1967)
- The Helicopter Spies (1968)
- How to Steal the World (1968)
