= Don Medford =

American television director (1917–2012)

- Born: Donald Muller; November 26, 1917; Detroit, Michigan
- Died: December 12, 2012 (aged 95); West Hills, California
- Occupations: Television and Film Director
- Years active: 1951–1989

Donald Muller (November 26, 1917 – December 12, 2012), known professionally as Don Medford, was an American television director who directed over 75 TV series between 1951 and 1989, and who also directed three theatrical films.

Medford directed the final two-part episode of the 1960s television series The Fugitive and the final episode of the 1980s television series The Colbys. He directed 26 episodes of the 80s soap opera Dynasty. He also directed the violent 1971 Western film The Hunting Party.

He died on 12 December 2012 at aged 95 in West Hills, California.

== Filmography ==
=== Films ===
- To Trap a Spy (1964)
- Cosa Nostra, Arch Enemy of the FBI (1967)
- Ghostbreakers (1967)
- Incident in San Francisco (1971)
- The Hunting Party (1971)
- The Organization (1971)
- The Fuzz Brothers (1973)
- The November Plan (1977)
- The Clone Master (1978)
- Coach of the Year (1980)
- Sizzle (1981)
- Dusty (1983)

=== Individual episodes ===
- The Twilight Zone
  - "A Passage for Trumpet" (1960)
  - "The Man in the Bottle" (1960)
  - "The Mirror" (1961)
  - "Deaths-Head Revisited" (1961)
  - "Death Ship" (1963)
- Dynasty (1981–1988) (26 episodes)
