= List of American films of 1968 =

More than 450 American films were released in 1968.

== Box office ==
The highest-grossing American films released in 1968, by domestic box office gross revenue as estimated by The Numbers, are as follows:

Highest-grossing films of 1968
Rank	Title	Distributor	Domestic gross
1	Funny Girl	Columbia Pictures	$58,500,000
2	2001: A Space Odyssey	MGM	$56,715,371
3	The Odd Couple	Paramount	$44,527,234
4	Bullitt	Warner Bros.	$42,300,873
5	Rosemary's Baby	Paramount	$33,395,426
6	Planet of the Apes	20th Century Fox	$32,589,624
7	Yours, Mine and Ours	MGM	$25,912,624
8	The Lion in Winter	Embassy Pictures	$22,276,975
9	The Green Berets	Warner Bros.	$21,707,027
10	Blackbeard's Ghost	Walt Disney	$21,540,050

== January–March ==
Opening		Title	Production company	Cast and crew	Ref.
J A N U A R Y	3	The Wicked Dreams of Paula Schultz	United Artists	George Marshall (director); Albert E. Lewin, Nat Perrin, Burt Styler (screenplay); Elke Sommer, Bob Crane, Werner Klemperer, Joey Forman, John Banner, Leon Askin, Maureen Arthur, Robert Carricart, Theodore Marcuse, Larry D. Mann, John Myhers, Chanin Hale, Barbara Morrison, Benny Baker, Fritz Feld, Jerry Douglas, Jack Perkins, Eddie Quillan, Paul Sorensen, Harry Von Zell, Ben Wright	
J A N U A R Y	8	Wild 90	Supreme Mix Productions	Norman Mailer (director); D.A. Pennebaker (screenplay); Norman Mailer, Buzz Farber, Mickey Knox, Beverly Bentley, José Torres, D.A. Pennebaker	
J A N U A R Y	12	Nobody's Perfect	Universal Pictures	Alan Rafkin (director); John D.F. Black (screenplay); Doug McClure, Nancy Kwan, James Whitmore, David Hartman, Gary Vinson, James Shigeta, George Furth, Keye Luke, Jerry Fujikawa, Edward Faulkner, Marian Collier, James Hong, Steve Carlson, Jill Donohue	
J A N U A R Y	17	The Biggest Bundle of Them All	Metro-Goldwyn-Mayer	Ken Annakin (director); Sy Salkowitz (screenplay); Robert Wagner, Raquel Welch, Godfrey Cambridge, Vittorio De Sica, Edward G. Robinson, Davy Kaye, Francesco Mulé, Victor Spinetti, Yvonne Sanson, Mickey Knox, Femi Benussi, Paola Borboni, Aldo Bufi Landi, Carlo Croccolo, Roberto De Simone, Piero Gerlini, Giulio Marchetti, Andrea Aureli, Ermelinda De Felice, Milena Vukotic, Carlo Rizzo, Nino Vingelli	
J A N U A R Y	18	Spider Baby	American General Pictures	Jack Hill (director/screenplay); Lon Chaney Jr., Jill Banner, Carol Ohmart, Quinn Redeker, Beverly Washburn, Sid Haig, Mantan Moreland, Joan Keller Stern, Mary Mitchel, Karl Schanzer, Carolyn Cooper	
J A N U A R Y	24	Firecreek	Warner Bros.-Seven Arts	Vincent McEveety (director); Calvin Clements Sr. (screenplay); James Stewart, Henry Fonda, Gary Lockwood, Dean Jagger, Ed Begley, Jay C. Flippen, Inger Stevens, Jack Elam, James Best, BarBara Luna, Jacqueline Scott, Brooke Bundy, Morgan Woodward, John Qualen, Louise Latham, Kitty Kelly, Bill McKinney, Almira Sessions, Felipe Turich, J. Robert Porter, Athena Lorde	
J A N U A R Y	24	Maryjane	American International Pictures	Maury Dexter (director); Dick Gautier, Peter Marshall (screenplay); Fabian, Diane McBain, Michael Margotta, Kevin Coughlin, Patty McCormack, Russ Bender, Booth Colman, Baynes Barron, Henry Hunter, Ivan Bonar, Byron Morrow, Bruce Mars, Frank Alesia, Terri Garr, Jo Ann Harris, Wayne Heffley, Carl Gottlieb, Garry K. Marshall, Joe Ross, Floyd Mutrux, Peter Marshall, Tom Nolan, Dick Gautier	
J A N U A R Y	29	How to Save a Marriage and Ruin Your Life	Columbia Pictures / Nob Hill Productions Inc.	Fielder Cook (director); Stanley Shapiro, Nate Monaster (screenplay); Dean Martin, Stella Stevens, Eli Wallach, Anne Jackson, Betty Field, Jack Albertson, Katharine Bard, Woodrow Parfrey, Alan Oppenheimer, Shelley Morrison, George Furth, Joe Gray, Murray Pollock, Cosmo Sardo, Al Silvani, Fred Walton, William Wintersole	
F E B R U A R Y	7	Sol Madrid	Metro-Goldwyn-Mayer / Hall Bartlett Pictures Inc. / Gershwin-Kastner Productions	Brian G. Hutton (director); David Karp (screenplay); David McCallum, Stella Stevens, Telly Savalas, Ricardo Montalbán, Rip Torn, Pat Hingle, Paul Lukas, Michael Ansara, Perry Lopez, Michael Conrad, Robert Rockwell, George Sawaya, Tony Giorgio, Tony Perez, Cosmo Sardo	
F E B R U A R Y	8	Blackbeard's Ghost	Walt Disney Productions / Buena Vista Distribution	Robert Stevenson (director); Don DaGradi, Bill Walsh (screenplay); Peter Ustinov, Dean Jones, Suzanne Pleshette, Elsa Lanchester, Joby Baker, Elliott Reid, Richard Deacon, Norm Grabowski, Kelly Thordsen, Michael Conrad, Herbie Faye, George Murdock, Hank Jones, Ned Glass, Gil Lamb, Alan Carney, Ted Markland, Lou Nova, Charlie Brill, Herb Vigran, William Fawcett, Betty Bronson, Elsie Baker, Kathryn Minner, Sara Taft, Phil Arnold, Noble "Kid" Chissell, Richard Collier, Gertrude Flynn, Byron Foulger, Paul Genge, Bing Russell, Lou Wagner	
F E B R U A R Y	8	Sweet November	Warner Bros.-Seven Arts	Robert Ellis Miller (director); Herman Raucher (screenplay); Sandy Dennis, Anthony Newley, Theodore Bikel, Burr DeBenning, Sandy Baron, Marj Dusay, Martin West, Virginia Vincent, King Moody, Robert Gibbons, Francis de Sales	
F E B R U A R Y	18	The Money Jungle	Commonwealth United Entertainment / United Pictures Corporation	Francis D. Lyon (director); Charles A. Wallace (screenplay); John Ericson, Lola Albright, Leslie Parrish, Nehemiah Persoff, Charles Drake, Kent Smith, Don Rickles, Michael Forest, Mark Roberts, Edy Williams, Dub Taylor, John Cliff, George DeNormand, Ed Parker, Marilyn Devin, Jim Adams, Leslie McRay, Dale Monroe, Dodie Warren, R.L. Armstrong, Byrd Holland, Richard Norris	
F E B R U A R Y	21	Bye Bye Braverman	Warner Bros.-Seven Arts	Sidney Lumet (director); Herbert Sargent (screenplay); George Segal, Jack Warden, Jessica Walter, Phyllis Newman, Joseph Wiseman, Sorrell Booke, Zohra Lampert, Godfrey Cambridge, Alan King, Anthony Holland, Graham Jarvis	
F E B R U A R Y	21	The Power	Metro-Goldwyn-Mayer	Byron Haskin (director); John Gay (screenplay); George Hamilton, Suzanne Pleshette, Richard Carlson, Yvonne de Carlo, Earl Holliman, Gary Merrill, Ken Murray, Barbara Nichols, Arthur O'Connell, Nehemiah Persoff, Aldo Ray, Michael Rennie, Miiko Taka, Celia Lovsky, Vaughn Taylor, Lawrence Montaigne, Beverly Powers, Forrest J. Ackerman, Minta Durfee, George Holmes, Boyd "Red" Morgan	
F E B R U A R Y	29	The Secret War of Harry Frigg	Universal Pictures / Albion Film Corp.	Jack Smight (director); Peter Stone, Frank Tarloff (screenplay); Paul Newman, Sylva Koscina, Andrew Duggan, Tom Bosley, John Williams, Charles Gray, Vito Scotti, Jacques Roux, Werner Peters, James Gregory, Fabrizio Mioni, Johnny Haymer, Norman Fell, Buck Henry, Horst Ebersberg, George Ives, Paul Gleason	
M A R C H	1	Day of the Evil Gun	Metro-Goldwyn-Mayer	Jerry Thorpe (director); Charles Marquis Warren (screenplay); Glenn Ford, Arthur Kennedy, Dean Jagger, John Anderson, Paul Fix, Nico Minardos, Dean Stanton, Pilar Pellicer, Parley Baer, Royal Dano, Ross Elliott, Barbara Babcock, James Griffith, Jaime Fernández, Jorge Martínez de Hoyos, Boyd "Red" Morgan, David Sharpe	
M A R C H	6	P.J.	Universal Pictures	John Guillermin (director); Philip Reisman Jr. (screenplay); George Peppard, Raymond Burr, Gayle Hunnicutt, Wilfrid Hyde-White, Brock Peters, Susan Saint James, Jason Evers, Coleen Gray, Severn Darden, George Furth, Herbert Edelman, John Qualen, Bert Freed, Ken Lynch, Jim Boles, Arte Johnson, Kirk Alyn, Leonard Bremen, Paul Bryar, Al Checco, H.B. Haggerty, Anthony James, Lee Kolima, Gene LeBell, King Moody, Barry Pearl, Billy Sands, Rockne Tarkington, Arthur Tovey, H. Jane Van Duser, Barbara Dana, King Charles MacNiles	
M A R C H	6	Psych-Out	American International Pictures / Dick Clark Productions	Richard Rush (director); E. Hunter Willett, Betty Ulius (screenplay); Susan Strasberg, Dean Stockwell, Jack Nicholson, Bruce Dern, Adam Roarke, Max Julien, Henry Jaglom, Linda Gaye Scott, I.J. Jefferson, Ken Scott, Gary Marshall, John Cardos, Gary Kent, The Strawberry Alarm Clock, The Seeds	
M A R C H	8	A Man Called Gannon	Universal Pictures	James Goldstone (director); Gene R. Kearney, Borden Chase, D.D. Beauchamp (screenplay); Tony Franciosa, Michael Sarrazin, Judi West, Susan Oliver, John Anderson, David Sheiner, James Westerfield, Gavin MacLeod, Eddie Firestone, Ed Peck, Harry Davis, Robert Sorrells, Terry Wilson, Eddra Gale, Harry Basch, James Callahan, Cliff Potter, Jason Evers, Stuart Nisbet, Jack Perkins	
M A R C H	8	Stay Away, Joe	Metro-Goldwyn-Mayer	Peter Tewksbury (director); Michael A. Hoey (screenplay); Elvis Presley, Burgess Meredith, Joan Blondell, Katy Jurado, Thomas Gomez, Henry Jones, L.Q. Jones, Quentin Dean, Anne Seymour, Douglas Henderson, Mike Lane, Warren Vanders, Buck Kartalian, Del "Sonny" West, Brett Parker, Joe Esposito, Harry Harvey, Charlie Hodge, Dick Wilson, Angus Duncan, Susan Trustman	
M A R C H	13	Counterpoint	Universal Pictures	Ralph Nelson (director); James Lee, Joel Oliansky (screenplay); Charlton Heston, Maximilian Schell, Kathryn Hays, Leslie Nielsen, Anton Diffring, Linden Chiles, Peter Masterson, Curt Lowens, Neva Patterson, Cyril Delevanti, Gregory Morton, Parley Baer, Dan Frazer, Ed Peck, Paul Birch, Horst Ebersberg, Bill Erwin, Mischa Hausserman, Ralph Nelson, Murray Pollock, Mark Russell, Cosmo Sardo, Wilbur Schwandt, Otis Young	
M A R C H	18	The Producers	Embassy Pictures	Mel Brooks (director/screenplay); Zero Mostel, Gene Wilder, Dick Shawn, Kenneth Mars, Estelle Winwood, Christopher Hewett, Andreas Voutsinas, Lee Meredith, Renée Taylor, Frank Campanella, Barney Martin, Diana Eden, Tucker Smith, Josip Elic, Bill Hickey, Mel Brooks, Hank Garrett, Bill Macy, David Patch, Madlyn Cates, Shimen Ruskin, John Zoller, Brutus Peck	
M A R C H	20	No Way to Treat a Lady	Paramount Pictures / Sol C. Siegel Productions	Jack Smight (director); John Gay (screenplay); Rod Steiger, Lee Remick, George Segal, Eileen Heckart, Murray Hamilton, Michael Dunn, Martine Bartlett, Barbara Baxley, Irene Dailey, Doris Roberts, Ruth White, Val Bisoglio, David Doyle, Kim August, Val Avery, Sam Coppola, Zvee Scooler	
M A R C H	21	The One and Only, Genuine, Original Family Band	Walt Disney Productions / Buena Vista Distribution	Michael O'Herlihy (director); Lowell S. Hawley (screenplay); Walter Brennan, Buddy Ebsen, Lesley Ann Warren, John Davidson, Janet Blair, Kurt Russell, Jon Walmsley, Pamelyn Ferdin, Richard Deacon, Wally Cox, Bill Woodson, Goldie Hawn, Butch Patrick, Larry J. Blake, Kenneth MacDonald, Philo McCullough, Peter Renaday, William Woodson, Bobby Riha, Smith Wordes, Heidi Rook, Debbie Smith, Steve Harmon, John Craig, Jonathan Kidd	
M A R C H	27	Arizona Bushwhackers	Paramount Pictures / A.C. Lyles Productions	Lesley Selander (director); Steve Fisher (screenplay); Howard Keel, Yvonne De Carlo, John Ireland, Marilyn Maxwell, Scott Brady, Brian Donlevy, Barton MacLane, James Craig, Montie Montana, James Cagney, Rod McGaughy, Roy Rogers Jr., Red Parton, Eric Cody	
M A R C H	29	Madigan	Universal Pictures	Donald Siegel (director); Henri Simoun, Abraham Polonsky (screenplay); Richard Widmark, Henry Fonda, Inger Stevens, Harry Guardino, James Whitmore, Susan Clark, Michael Dunn, Steve Ihnat, Don Stroud, Sheree North, Warren Stevens, Raymond St. Jacques, Bert Freed, Harry Bellaver, Frank Marth, Lloyd Gough, Virginia Gregg, Henry Beckman, Woodrow Parfrey, Lloyd Haines, Ray Montgomery, Conrad Bain, Philippa Bevans, William Bramley, Abel Fernandez, Lincoln Kilpatrick, John McLiam, James Nolan, Richard O'Brien, Kathleen O'Malley, Ollie O'Toole, Tom Rosqui, Paul Sorensen, Dallas Mitchell, Seth Allen, Kay Turner	

== April–June ==
Opening		Title	Production company	Cast and crew	Ref.
A P R I L	2	The Scalphunters	United Artists / Norlan Productions	Sydney Pollack (director); William W. Norton (screenplay); Burt Lancaster, Shelley Winters, Telly Savalas, Ossie Davis, Dabney Coleman, Paul Picerni, Dan Vadis, Armando Silvestre, Nick Cravat, Tony Epper, Chuck Roberson	
A P R I L	3	2001: A Space Odyssey	Metro-Goldwyn-Mayer / Stanley Kubrick Productions	Stanley Kubrick (director/screenplay); Arthur C. Clarke (screenplay); Keir Dullea, Gary Lockwood, William Sylvester, Daniel Richter, Leonard Rossiter, Margaret Tyzack, Robert Beatty, Sean Sullivan, Douglas Rain, Bill Weston, Ed Bishop, Alan Gifford, Ann Gillis, Penny Brahms, Harry Fielder, Kenneth Kendall, Vivian Kubrick, Chela Matthison, Frank Miller, Edwina Carroll, Heather Downham, Maggie d'Abo	
A P R I L	3	Planet of the Apes	20th Century-Fox / APJAC Productions	Franklin J. Schaffner (director); Michael Wilson, Rod Serling (screenplay); Charlton Heston, Roddy McDowall, Kim Hunter, Maurice Evans, James Whitmore, James Daly, Linda Harrison, Lou Wagner, Woodrow Parfrey, Buck Kartalian, Norman Burton, Wright King, Paul Lambert, Army Archerd, Billy Curtis, Frank Delfino, Jerry Maren, Harry Monty, John Quijada, Ronald L. Schwary, Felix Silla, Jeff Burton, Robert Gunner, Dianne Stanley	
A P R I L	4	The Party	United Artists / The Mirisch Corporation	Blake Edwards (director/screenplay); Tom Waldman, Frank Waldman (screenplay); Peter Sellers, Claudine Longet, Jean Carson, Marge Champion, Al Checco, Corinne Cole, Dick Crockett, Frances Davis, Danielle de Metz, Herb Ellis, Paul Ferrara, Steve Franken, Kathe Green, James Lanphier, Buddy Lester, Gavin MacLeod, Fay McKenzie, J. Edward McKinley, Denny Miller, Timothy Scott, Carol Wayne, Helen Kleeb, Linda Gaye Scott, Vin Scully, Natalia Borisova, Allen Jung, Sharron Kimberly, Stephen Liss, Jerry Martin, Elianne Nadeau, Thomas W. Quine, Ken Wales, Donald R. Frost, George Winters	
A P R I L	10	Where Angels Go, Trouble Follows	Columbia Pictures	James Neilson (director); Blanche Hanalis (screenplay); Rosalind Russell, Stella Stevens, Binnie Barnes, Susan Saint James, Mary Wickes, Dolores Sutton, Milton Berle, Arthur Godfrey, Van Johnson, Robert Taylor, Hilary Thompson, June Fairchild, Tommy Boyce, Michael Christian, John Findlater, Bobby Hart, Alexandra Hay, Michelle Holmes, William Lundigan, Portia Nelson, Barbara Hunter, Alice Rawlings, Devon Douglas, Ellen Moss, Cherie Lamour	
A P R I L	10	Will Penny	Paramount Pictures	Tom Gries (director/screenplay); Charlton Heston, Joan Hackett, Donald Pleasence, Lee Majors, Bruce Dern, Ben Johnson, Slim Pickens, Clifton James, Anthony Zerbe, Roy Jenson, G.D. Spradlin, Quentin Dean, William Schallert, Lydia Clarke, Matt Clark, Luke Askew, Chanin Hale, Robert Luster, Dal Jenkins, Anthony Costello, Gene Rutherford, Jon Francis, Stephen Edwards	
A P R I L	17	The Private Navy of Sgt. O'Farrell	United Artists / John Beck-Naho Productions	Frank Tashlin (director/screenplay); Bob Hope, Phyllis Diller, Jeffrey Hunter, John Myhers, Mako, Henry Wilcoxon, Dick Sargent, Christopher Dark, Michael Burns, William Wellman Jr., Robert Donner, Jack Grinnage, William Christopher, Mylène Demongeot, Miss Gina Lollobrigida, Bing Crosby, Edith Fellows, John Spina	
A P R I L	24	Blue	Paramount Pictures / Kettledrum Production, Inc.	Silvio Narizzano (director); Meade Roberts, Ronald M. Cohen (screenplay); Terence Stamp, Joanna Pettet, Karl Malden, Ricardo Montalbán, Joe De Santis, James Westerfield, Stathis Giallelis, Kevin Corcoran, Helen Kleeb, Michael Bell, Alma Beltran, Sally Kirkland, Peggy Lipton, Michael Nader, Anthony Costello, Carlos East, Sara Vardi, Robert Lipton, Ivalou Redd, Dorothy Conrad, Wes Bishop, Marian Mason, Jerry Gatlin, William Shannon	
A P R I L	24	Yours, Mine and Ours	United Artists / Desilu Productions / Walden Productions	Melville Shavelson (director/screenplay); Mort Lachman (screenplay); Lucille Ball, Henry Fonda, Van Johnson, Louise Troy, Sidney Miller, Tom Bosley, Walter Brooke, Tim Matheson, Gary Goetzman, Morgan Brittany, Tracy Nelson, Jennifer Leak, Kimberly Beck, Mitch Vogel, Eric Shea, Ben Murphy, Ysabel MacCloskey, Marjorie Eaton, Lilyan Chauvin, Jennifer Gan, Stuart Nisbet, Arthur Peterson, Larry Hankin, Harry Holcombe, Billy Beck, Marla Gibbs, Kevin Tighe, Gil Rogers, Nancy Roth, Holly O'Brien, Michele Tobin, Maralee Foster, Stephanie Oliver, Kevin Burchett, Margot Jane, Greg Atkins, Lynnell Atkins	
M A Y	1	Don't Just Stand There!	Universal Pictures	Ron Winston (director); Charles Williams (screenplay); Robert Wagner, Mary Tyler Moore, Glynis Johns, Harvey Korman, Barbara Rhoades, Vincent Beck, Joseph V. Perry, Stuart Margolin, Émile Genest, David Mauro, Penny Santon, Joseph Bernard, Bern Hoffman, Willi Koopman, Herb Voland, Otis Young	
M A Y	1	The Mini-Skirt Mob	American International Pictures	Maury Dexter (director); James Gordon White (screenplay); Jeremy Slate, Diane McBain, Sherry Jackson, Patty McCormack, Ross Hagen, Harry Dean Stanton, Ronnie Rondell	
M A Y	1	Tarzan and the Jungle Boy	Paramount Pictures / Banner Productions	Robert Gordon (director); Stephen Lord (screenplay); Mike Henry, Rafer Johnson, Aliza Gur, Steve Bond, Ron Gans, Ed Johnson, José Lewgoy	
M A Y	2	The Odd Couple	Paramount Pictures	Gene Saks (director); Neil Simon (screenplay); Jack Lemmon, Walter Matthau, John Fiedler, Herbert Edelman, David Sheiner, Larry Haines, Monica Evans, Carole Shelley, Iris Adrian, Matty Alou, Al Barlick, John C. Becher, Ted Beniades, Billie Bird, Ken Boyer, Heywood Hale Broun, Jerry Buchek, Roberto Clemente, Tommy Davis, Augie Donatelli, Jack Fisher, Bud Harrelson, Cleon Jones, Ed Kranepool, Vernon Law, Bill Mazeroski, Joe Palma, Angelique Pettyjohn, Harry Spear, Maury Wills	
M A Y	10	Project X	Paramount Pictures	William Castle (director); Edmund Morris (screenplay); Christopher George, Greta Baldwin, Henry Jones, Monte Markham, Harold Gould, Phillip E. Pine, Lee Delano, Ivan Bonar, Robert Cleaves, Charles Irving, Keye Luke, Ed Prentiss	
M A Y	15	The Devil's Brigade	United Artists / Wolper Pictures	Andrew V. McLaglen (director); William Roberts (screenplay); William Holden, Cliff Robertson, Vince Edwards, Michael Rennie, Dana Andrews, Gretchen Wyler, Andrew Prine, Claude Akins, Carroll O'Connor, Richard Jaeckel, Jack Watson, Paul Hornung, Gene Fullmer, Jeremy Slate, Bill Fletcher, Richard Dawson, Tom Troupe, Luke Askew, Jean-Paul Vignon, Tom Stern, Harry Carey Jr., Patric Knowles, Wilhelm von Homburg, Maggie Thrett, James Craig, Richard Simmons, Norman Alden, Don Megowan, Alix Talton, Alan Caillou, Hal Needham, Patrick Waltz, Karl-Otto Alberty, Gérard Herter	
M A Y	15	The Swimmer	Columbia Pictures / Horizon Pictures	Frank Perry (director); Eleanor Perry (screenplay); Burt Lancaster, Janet Landgard, Janice Rule, Marge Champion, Kim Hunter, Bill Fiore, Rose Gregorio, Charles Drake, House Jameson, Bernie Hamilton, Jan Miner, Diana Muldaur, Joan Rivers, Cornelia Otis Skinner, Dolph Sweet, Louise Troy, Diana Van der Vlis, Philip Bruns, John Cheever, Lisa Daniels, Eleanor Perry, Frank Perry, Tony Bickley, Nancy Cushman, Jimmy Joyce, Michael Kearney, Richard McMurray, Keri Oleson	
M A Y	17	Journey to Shiloh	Universal Pictures	William Hale (director); Gene L. Coon (screenplay); James Caan, Michael Sarrazin, Brenda Scott, Don Stroud, Paul Petersen, Michael Burns, Michael Vincent, Harrison Ford, John Doucette, Noah Beery, Tisha Sterling, James Gammon, Brian Avery, Clarke Gordon, Robert Pine, Sean Kennedy, Wesley Lau, Chet Stratton, Bing Russell, Lane Bradford, Rex Ingram, Myron Healey, Eileen Wesson, Albert Popwell, Susanne Benton, George Keymas, Charles Lampkin, John Rubinstein	
M A Y	23	Kona Coast	Warner Bros.-Seven Arts / Pioneer Productions	Lamont Johnson (director); Gilbert Ralston (screenplay); Richard Boone, Vera Miles, Joan Blondell, Steve Ihnat, Chips Rafferty, Kent Smith, Duane Eddy	
M A Y	24	The Savage Seven	American International Pictures / Dick Clark Productions	Richard Rush (director); Michael Fisher (screenplay); Robert Walker Jr., Larry Bishop, Joanna Frank, John Garwood, Adam Roarke, Max Julien, Richard Anders, Duane Eddy, Chuck Bail, Billy "Green" Bush, John Cardos, Beach Dickerson, Gary Kent, Penny Marshall, Virgil Frye	
M A Y	24	What's So Bad About Feeling Good?	Universal Pictures	George Seaton (director/screenplay); Robert Pirosh (screenplay); George Peppard, Mary Tyler Moore, Don Stroud, Susan Saint James, Dom DeLuise, Nathaniel Frey, John McMartin, Charles Lane, Jeanne Arnold, George Furth, Morty Gunty, Joe Ponazecki, Frank Campanella, Thelma Ritter, Hy Anzell, Franklin Cover, Joel Crothers, Hal K. Dawson, Paul Dooley, Joey Faye, Conard Fowkes, Hugh Franklin, Arny Freeman, Moses Gunn, Albert Henderson, Bob Kaliban, Lincoln Kilpatrick, Mina Kolb, Ira Lewis, Cleavon Little, Lou Martini Jr., Eda Reiss Merin, Barbara Minkus, James Noble, George Petrie, Nat Polen, Tom Rosqui, John P. Ryan, Gillian Spencer, Peter Turgeon, Luis Van Rooten, Titos Vandis, Ned Wertimer, Emily Yancy, Louis Zorich	
M A Y	28	The Detective	20th Century-Fox / Arcola Pictures Corporation	Gordon Douglas (director); Abby Mann (screenplay); Frank Sinatra, Lee Remick, Ralph Meeker, Jack Klugman, Lloyd Bochner, William Windom, Tony Musante, Al Freeman Jr., Robert Duvall, Jacqueline Bisset, Horace McMahon, Pat Henry, Patrick McVey, Dixie Marquis, Sugar Ray Robinson, Renée Taylor, James Inman, Tom Atkins, Ted Beniades, Don Fellows, Bette Midler, Earl Montgomery, Peg Murray, George Plimpton, Jilly Rizzo, Norman Rose, Joe Santos, Philip Sterling	
M A Y	28	Madigan's Millions	American International Pictures	Stanley Prager (director); José Luis de las Bayonas (screenplay); Dustin Hoffman, Elsa Martinelli, Cesar Romero, Gustavo Rojo, Fernando Hilbeck, Riccardo Garrone, Franco Fabrizi, Umberto Raho, Gérard Tichy, Jose Maria Caffarel, Ennio Antonelli, Fortunato Arena, Remo De Angelis, Gigi Bonos, Alfredo Mayo, Luciano Foti, Jack Palance, Romano Puppo	
M A Y	28	Villa Rides	Paramount Pictures	Buzz Kulik (director); Robert Towne, Sam Peckinpah (screenplay); Yul Brynner, Robert Mitchum, Grazia Buccella, Herbert Lom, Robert Viharo, Charles Bronson, Frank Wolff, Alexander Knox, Diana Lorys, Robert Carricart, Fernando Rey, Julio Peña, José María Prada, Antoñito Ruiz, Jill Ireland, Xan das Bolas, José Canalejas, John Ireland, José Riesgo, Seyyal Taner, Regina de Julián, Andrés Monreal	
J U N E	5	Bandolero!	20th Century-Fox	Andrew V. McLaglen (director); James Lee Barrett (screenplay); James Stewart, Dean Martin, Raquel Welch, George Kennedy, Andrew Prine, Will Geer, Clint Ritchie, Denver Pyle, Tom Heaton, Rudy Diaz, Sean McClory, Harry Carey Jr., Don "Red" Barry, Guy Raymond, Perry Lopez, Jock Mahoney, Dub Taylor, Big John Hamilton, Robert Adler, John Mitchum, Patrick Cranshaw, Roy Barcroft, Joe Gray, Hal Needham	
J U N E	5	Angels from Hell	American International Pictures	Bruce Kessler (director); Jerome Wish (screenplay); Tom Stern, Arlene Martel, Ted Markland, Jack Starrett, Paul Bertoya, Jimmy Murphy, Sandra Bettin, Bob Harris, Luana Talltree, Susanne Walters, Rod Wilmoth, Stephen Oliver, Pepper Martin, Jay York, Ginger Snapp, Lori Hay, Lee Stanley, Doug Hume, Jim Reynolds, Steven Rogers, Susan Holloway, Judith Garwood, Tony Rush, Maureen Heard, Barry Feinstein, Dodie Warren, Wally Berns, Cynthia McAdams, Bud Ekins, The Madcaps of Bakersfield	
J U N E	5	Chubasco	Warner Bros.-Seven Arts / William Conrad Productions	Allen H. Miner (director/screenplay); Richard Egan, Christopher Jones, Susan Strasberg, Ann Sothern, Simon Oakland, Audrey Totter, Preston Foster, Peter Whitney, Edward Binns, Joe De Santis, Norman Alden, Stewart Moss, Ron Rich, Milton Frome, Baynes Barron, Roberto Contreras, Seamon Glass, Midori, Joyce Nizzari, Buck Young, Ernest Sarracino, Suzanne Benoit, Lili Valenty	
J U N E	5	For Singles Only	Columbia Pictures / Four Leaf Productions, Inc.	Arthur Dreifuss (director/screenplay); Hal Collins (screenplay); John Saxon, Mary Ann Mobley, Lana Wood, Mark Richman, Milton Berle, Ann Elder, Chris Noel, Marty Ingels, Charles Robinson, Hortense Petra, Charles Robinson, Duke Hobbie, Walter Wanderley Trio with Talya Ferro, Cal Tjader Band, Lewis & Clark Expedition, Nitty Gritty Dirt Band, The Sunshine Company, Angelique Pettyjohn	
J U N E	5	Jigsaw	Universal Pictures	James Goldstone (director); Quentin Werty, Peter Stone (screenplay); Harry Guardino, Bradford Dillman, Hope Lange, Pat Hingle, Diana Hyland, Victor Jory, Paul Stewart, Susan Saint James, Michael J. Pollard, Roy Jenson, Susanne Benton, Kent McCord, James Doohan	
J U N E	10	Petulia	Warner Bros.-Seven Arts	Richard Lester (director); Lawrence B. Marcus (screenplay); Julie Christie, George C. Scott, Richard Chamberlain, Arthur Hill, Shirley Knight, Joseph Cotten, Pippa Scott, Kathleen Widdoes, Roger Bowen, Richard Dysart, Ruth Kobart, Ellen Geer, Lou Gilbert, Nate Esformes, Maria Val, Vincent Arias, Eric Weiss, Kevin Cooper, The Grateful Dead, Big Brother and the Holding Company, The Committee, Ace Trucking Company, René Auberjonois, Peter Bonerz, Barbara Bosson, Barbara Colby, Garry Goodrow, Carl Gottlieb, Howard Hesseman, Kathryn Ish, Janis Joplin, Austin Pendleton, Richard Stahl, Mel Stewart	
J U N E	12	Rosemary's Baby	Paramount Pictures / William Castle Enterprises	Roman Polanski (director/screenplay); Mia Farrow, John Cassavetes, Ruth Gordon, Sidney Blackmer, Maurice Evans, Ralph Bellamy, Angela Dorian, Patsy Kelly, Elisha Cook, Emmaline Henry, Charles Grodin, Hanna Landy, Philip Leeds, D'Urville Martin, Hope Summers, Marianne Gordon, Wendy Wagner, Rutanya Alda, Walter Baldwin, Roy Barcroft, Carol Brewster, William Castle, Gordon Connell, Tony Curtis, Duke Fishman, Ernest Harada, Mona Knox, Natalie Masters, Floyd Mutrux, Robert Osterloh, George R. Robertson, George Savalas, Almira Sessions, Sharon Tate, Max Wagner	
J U N E	12	Speedway	Metro-Goldwyn-Mayer	Norman Taurog (director); Philip Shuken (screenplay); Elvis Presley, Nancy Sinatra, Bill Bixby, Gale Gordon, William Schallert, Victoria Meyerink, Ross Hagen, Carl Ballantine, Poncie Ponce, Harry Hickox, Richard Petty, Buddy Baker, Cale Yarborough, Dick Hutcherson, Tiny Lund, G.C. Spencer, Roy Mayne, Harper Carter, Carl Reindel, Charlotte Considine, Sandy Reed, George Cisar, George DeNormand, William Keene, S. John Launer, Burt Mustin, Hal Riddle, Cosmo Sardo, Robert J. Stevenson, Arthur Tovey	
J U N E	12	The Sweet Ride	20th Century-Fox	Harvey Hart (director); Tom Mankiewicz (screenplay); Tony Franciosa, Michael Sarrazin, Jacqueline Bisset, Bob Denver, Michael Wilding, Michele Carey, Lara Lindsay, Norma Crane, Percy Rodriguez, Warren Stevens, Charles Dierkop, Pat Buttram, Michael Forest, Lloyd Gough, Stacy King, Corinna Tsopei, Arthur Franz, Seymour Cassel, Marc Cavell, Sam Chew Jr., John Cliff, Mickey Dora, Moby Grape, Lee Hazlewood, John Holmes, Wesley Lau, Larry Linville, William O'Connell	
J U N E	19	The Green Berets	Warner Bros.-Seven Arts / Batjac Productions	John Wayne, Ray Kellogg (directors); James Lee Barrett (screenplay); John Wayne, David Janssen, Jim Hutton, Aldo Ray, Raymond St. Jacques, Bruce Cabot, Jack Soo, George Takei, Patrick Wayne, Luke Askew, Irene Tsu, Edward Faulkner, Jason Evers, Mike Henry, Craig Jue, Chuck Roberson, Eddy Donno, Richard "Cactus" Pryor, Charles Bail, Jess Barker, Walker Edmiston, Paul Genge, Tom Hennesy, Cliff Lyons, James Seay, Dick Warlock, Sheb Wooley	
J U N E	19	The Thomas Crown Affair	United Artists / The Mirisch Corporation / Simkoe Solar Productions	Norman Jewison (director); Alan R. Trustman (screenplay); Steve McQueen, Faye Dunaway, Paul Burke, Jack Weston, Biff McGuire, Addison Powell, Gordon Pinsent, Yaphet Kotto, Sidney Armus, Richard Bull, Patrick Horgan, Tom Rosqui, Nora Marlowe, Sam Melville, Ted Gehring, Paul Verdier, Judy Pace, Bruce Glover, Charles Lampkin, John Orchard, Johnny Silver, Peg Shirley, Michael Shillo, Astrid Heeren	
J U N E	19	Where Were You When the Lights Went Out?	Metro-Goldwyn-Mayer	Hy Averback (director); Everett Freeman, Karl Tunberg (screenplay); Doris Day, Patrick O'Neal, Robert Morse, Terry-Thomas, Lola Albright, Steve Allen, Jim Backus, Ben Blue, Pat Paulsen, Robert Emhardt, Harry Hickox, Parley Baer, Earl Wilson, Murray Alper, Hy Averback, Larry J. Blake, George DeNormand, Morgan Freeman, John Hart, William Henry, Chuck Hicks, Don Kennedy, Nora Marlowe, James McEachin, Boyd "Red" Morgan, Byron Morrow, James Nusser, Angelique Pettyjohn, Timothy Scott, Charles Seel, Johnny Silver, Max Wagner, Dale Malone, Randy Whipple	
J U N E	25	The Secret Life of an American Wife	20th Century-Fox	George Axelrod (director/screenplay); Walter Matthau, Anne Jackson, Patrick O'Neal, Edy Williams, Richard Bull, Paul Napier, Gary Brown, Albert Carrier, Darrell Zwerling	
J U N E	26	Never a Dull Moment	Walt Disney Productions / Buena Vista Distribution	Jerry Paris (director); A.J. Carothers (screenplay); Dick Van Dyke, Edward G. Robinson, Dorothy Provine, Henry Silva, Joanna Cook Moore, Tony Bill, Slim Pickens, Jack Elam, Ned Glass, Richard Bakalyan, Mickey Shaughnessy, Philip Coolidge, James Millhollin, Eleanor Audley, Anthony Caruso, John Cliff, Russ Conway, Minta Durfee, Ken Lynch, Tyler McVey, Jerry Paris, Cosmo Sardo, Johnny Silver, Dick Winslow	

== July–September ==
Opening		Title	Production company	Cast and crew	Ref.
J U L Y	3	Eve	Commonwealth United Corporation	Jeremy Summers (director); Peter Welbeck (screenplay); Robert Walker Jr., Fred Clark, Herbert Lom, Christopher Lee, Celeste Yarnall, Rosenda Monteros, Maria Rohm, José María Caffarel, Ricardo Diaz	
J U L Y	12	A Lovely Way to Die	Universal Pictures	David Lowell Rich (director); A.J. Russell (screenplay); Kirk Douglas, Sylva Koscina, Eli Wallach, Kenneth Haigh, Martyn Green, Sharon Farrell, Ruth White, Philip Bosco, Ralph Waite, Meg Myles, William Roerick, Dana Elcar, Dolph Sweet, Dee Victor, Lincoln Kilpatrick, Marty Glickman, Conrad Bain, Richard S. Castellano, Leslie Charleson, Hank Garrett, Robert Gerringer, Ron Hale, David Huddleston, Ali MacGraw, Marianne McAndrew, Joseph V. Perry, Doris Roberts, John P. Ryan, Alex Stevens, Sydney Walker	
J U L Y	14	Did You Hear the One About the Traveling Saleslady?	Universal Pictures	Don Weis (director); John Fenton Murray (screenplay); Phyllis Diller, Bob Denver, Joe Flynn, Jeanette Nolan, Paul Reed, Bob Hastings, David Hartman, George N. Neise, Kelly Thordsen, Charles Lane, Dallas McKennon, Herb Vigran, Eddie Quillan, Kent McCord, Eileen Wesson, Anita Eubank, Jane Dulo, Lloyd Kino, Warde Donovan, Eddie Ness	
J U L Y	17	For Love of Ivy	Cinerama Releasing Corporation / Palomar Pictures	Daniel Mann (director); Robert Alan Aurthur (screenplay); Sidney Poitier, Abbey Lincoln, Beau Bridges, Nan Martin, Lauri Peters, Carroll O'Connor, Leon Bibb, Hugh Hurd, Lon Satton, Paul Harris, Christopher St. John, Marlene Clark, Gloria Hendry, Josip Elic, Jennifer O'Neill	
J U L Y	24	Anzio	Columbia Pictures / Dino de Laurentiis Cinematografica	Edward Dmytryk (director); HAL Craig, Frank De Felitta, Duilio Coletti, Giuseppe Mangione (screenplay); Robert Mitchum, Peter Falk, Earl Holliman, Mark Damon, Reni Santoni, Thomas Hunter, Anthony Steel, Wayde Preston, Arthur Kennedy, Robert Ryan, Wolfgang Preiss, Tonio Selwart, Giancarlo Giannini, Arthur Franz, Patrick Magee, Venantino Venantini, Enzo Turco, Richard Arlen, Herbert Fux, Alberto Sordi, Joseph Walsh, Elsa Albani, Annabella Andreoli, Stefanella Giovannini, Marcella Valeri, Elizabeth Thompson, Wolfgang Hillinger	
J U L Y	29	In Enemy Country	Universal Pictures	Harry Keller (director); Edward Anhalt, Sy Bartlett (screenplay); Anthony Franciosa, Anjanette Comer, Guy Stockwell, Paul Hubschmid, Tom Bell, Michael Constantine, Harry Townes, John Marley, Milton Selzer, Patric Knowles, Tige Andrews, Émile Genest, Lee Bergere, Virginia Christine, Harry Landers, Gene Dynarski, Ivor Barry, Simon Scott, Mischa Hausserman, Murray Matheson, Jean-Michel Michenaud, Paul Busch, Jim Creech, Norbert Meisel, Gerd Rein, Norbert Schiller	
J U L Y	31	5 Card Stud	Paramount Pictures	Henry Hathaway (director); Marguerite Roberts (screenplay); Dean Martin, Robert Mitchum, Inger Stevens, Roddy McDowall, Katherine Justice, John Anderson, Ruth Springford, Yaphet Kotto, Denver Pyle, Bill Fletcher, Whit Bissell, Ted de Corsia, Don Collier, Roy Jenson, Joe Gray, Chuck Hayward, Bob Hoy, Louise Lorimer, Boyd "Red" Morgan, George Robotham, Hope Summers	
A U G U S T	3	Hang 'Em High	United Artists / Leonard Freeman Productions / The Malpaso Company	Ted Post (director); Leonard Freeman, Mel Goldberg (screenplay); Clint Eastwood, Inger Stevens, Ed Begley, Pat Hingle, Ben Johnson, Charles McGraw, Ruth White, Bruce Dern, Alan Hale Jr., Arlene Golonka, James Westerfield, Dennis Hopper, L.Q. Jones, Michael O'Sullivan, Joseph Sirola, James MacArthur, Bob Steele, Bert Freed, Russell Thorson, Ned Romero, Jonathan Lippe, Tod Andrews, Mark Lenard, Roy Glenn, Paul Sorensen, Larry J. Blake, Barry Cahill, John Wesley, Bill Zuckert, Robert B. Williams, George DeNormand, Frank Ellis, Joel Fluellen, Nicholas Georgiade, Jack Ging, Michael Lembeck, Tammy Locke, Harvey Parry, Jack Tornek, Bruce Scott, Rick Gates	
A U G U S T	3	With Six You Get Eggroll	National General Pictures / Cinema Center Films / Arwin Productions	Howard Morris (director); Gwen Bagni, Paul Dubov, Harvey Bullock, R.S. Allen (screenplay); Doris Day, Brian Keith, Pat Carroll, Barbara Hershey, George Carlin, Alice Ghostley, Elaine Devry, Herb Voland, Jamie Farr, William Christopher, Milton Frome, Allan Melvin, Jackie Joseph, Vic Tayback, The Grass Roots, Jim Boles, Norman Leavitt, Peter Leeds, Howard Morris, Ken Osmond, Maudie Prickett, John Findlater, Richard Steele, Jimmy Bracken, Mickey Deems	
A U G U S T	15	Targets	Paramount Pictures / Saticoy Productions	Peter Bogdanovich (director/screenplay); Boris Karloff, Tim O'Kelly, Nancy Hsueh, Peter Bogdanovich, Arthur Peterson, James Brown, Mary Jackson, Sandy Baron, Monte Landis, Gary Kent, Frank Marshall, Mike Farrell, Susan Douglas Rubeš, Polly Platt, Daniel Selznick, Don Steele, Tanya Morgan, Paul Condylis, Stafford Morgan, Mark Dennis, Jay Daniel, Warren White	
A U G U S T	15	A Time to Sing	Metro-Goldwyn-Mayer / Four Leaf Productions	Arthur Dreifuss (director); Robert E. Kent, Orville H. Hampton (screenplay); Hank Williams Jr., Shelley Fabares, Ed Begley, D'Urville Martin, Donald Woods, Clara Ward, Harold Ayer, Dick Haynes, Gene Gentry, John Wheeler, Liz Renay, Charles Robinson	
A U G U S T	20	How Sweet It Is!	National General Pictures / Cherokee Productions	Jerry Paris (director); Jerry Belson, Garry Marshall (screenplay); James Garner, Debbie Reynolds, Maurice Ronet, Terry-Thomas, Paul Lynde, Marcel Dalio, Gino Conforti, Donald Losby, Hilary Thompson, Alexandra Hay, Mary Michael, Walter Brooke, Elena Verdugo, Jon Silo, Ann M. Guilbert, Vito Scotti, Larry Hankin, Jack Colvin, Leigh French, Erin Moran, Don Diamond, Johnny Silver, Penny Marshall, Lynn Carey, Heather Menzies, Sharon Cintron, Luana Anders, Frank Baker, Harry Caesar, George DeNormand, Garry Marshall, John Martino, Cosmo Sardo, Jack Tornek	
A U G U S T	26	Rachel, Rachel	Warner Bros.-Seven Arts / Kayos Productions	Paul Newman (director); Stewart Stern (screenplay); Joanne Woodward, James Olson, Kate Harrington, Estelle Parsons, Donald Moffat, Terry Kiser, Frank Corsaro, Bernard Barrow, Geraldine Fitzgerald, Beatrice Pons	
S E P T E M B E R	11	The Young Runaways	Metro-Goldwyn-Mayer / Four Leaf Productions	Arthur Dreifuss (director); Orville H. Hampton (screenplay); Brooke Bundy, Kevin Coughlin, Lloyd Bochner, Patty McCormack, Lynn Bari, Norman Fell, Quentin Dean, Richard Dreyfuss, Dick Sargent, James Edwards, Isabel Sanford, Stacey Gregg, Lance LeGault, Nicholas Georgiade, Ted Gehring, Army Archerd, Sam Edwards, Hortense Petra, Cynthia Hull, Ken Del Conte, Angus Duncan	
S E P T E M B E R	18	Funny Girl	Columbia Pictures / Rastar	William Wyler (director); Isobel Lennart (screenplay); Barbra Streisand, Omar Sharif, Kay Medford, Anne Francis, Walter Pidgeon, Lee Allen, Mae Questel, Gerald Mohr, Frank Faylen, Mittie Lawrence, Gertrude Flynn, Penny Santon, John Harmon, Thordis Brandt, Sharon Vaughn, Lillian Adams, Peter Adams, William "Billy" Benedict, Gene Callahan, Noble "Kid" Chissell, Ruth Clifford, Cis Corman, Hal K. Dawson, George DeNormand, Minta Durfee, Larry Gelman, Lloyd Gough, Viola Harris, Craig Huxley, Elaine Joyce, Sherry Lansing, Ethelreda Leopold, Michael Mark, Lee Meredith, Belle Mitchell, Shelley Morrison, Joe Ploski, Tommy Rall, Johnny Silver, Frank Sully, Bunny Summers, Arthur Tovey, John Warburton, Dick Winslow	
S E P T E M B E R	18	Pretty Poison	20th Century-Fox	Noel Black (director); Lorenzo Semple Jr. (screenplay); Anthony Perkins, Tuesday Weld, Beverly Garland, John Randolph, Dick O'Neill, Clarice Blackburn, Joseph Bova, Ken Kercheval, Don Fellows, Parker Fennelly, Gil Rogers	
S E P T E M B E R	22	The Split	Metro-Goldwyn-Mayer / Spectrum Productions	Gordon Flemyng (director); Robert Sabaroff (screenplay); Jim Brown, Diahann Carroll, Julie Harris, Gene Hackman, Jack Klugman, Warren Oates, James Whitmore, Ernest Borgnine, Donald Sutherland, Joyce Jameson, Harry Hickox, Jackie Joseph, Warren Vanders, Thordis Brandt, Harry Caesar, Antony Carbone, George Cisar, Edith Evanson, Robert Foulk, Roman Gabriel, Chuck Hicks, Jonathan Hole, John Orchard, Anne Randall, George Robotham, Bart Starr	
S E P T E M B E R	23	Charly	Cinerama Releasing Corporation / ABC Pictures / Robertson and Associates / Selmur Productions	Ralph Nelson (director); Stirling Silliphant (screenplay); Cliff Robertson, Claire Bloom, Lilia Skala, Leon Janney, Ruth White, Dick Van Patten, Barney Martin, Edward McNally, William Dwyer, Dan Morgan, Randee Lynne Jensen, Ralph Nelson	
S E P T E M B E R	n.d.	Fanny Hill Meets the Red Baron	Barry Mahon productions	Barry Mahon (director); Sue Evans, Cherie Winters, Kristen Steen	

== October–December ==
Opening		Title	Production company	Cast and crew	Ref.
O C T O B E R	1	Night of the Living Dead	Continental Distributing / Image Ten	George A. Romero (director/screenplay); John Russo (screenplay); Duane Jones, Judith O'Dea, Karl Hardman, Marilyn Eastman, Bill Hinzman, George Kosana, Bill "Chilly Billy" Cardille, Richard France, George A. Romero, John Russo, Russell Streiner, Kyra Schon, Keith Wayne, Judith Ridley	
O C T O B E R	2	Coogan's Bluff	Universal Pictures / The Malpaso Company	Don Siegel (director); Herman Miller, Dean Riesner, Howard Rodman (screenplay); Clint Eastwood, Lee J. Cobb, Susan Clark, Tisha Sterling, Don Stroud, Betty Field, Tom Tully, James Edwards, David F. Doyle, Louis Zorich, Meg Myles, Marjorie Bennett, Seymour Cassel, Albert Popwell, Conrad Bain, Albert Henderson, James McCallion, Jess Osuna, Antonia Rey, Eve Brent, Linda Clifford, Larry Duran, James McEachin, Kathleen O'Malley, Robert Osterloh, Don Siegel, Kristoffer Tabori, Melodie Johnson, Rudy Diaz	
O C T O B E R	7	I Love You, Alice B. Toklas	Warner Bros.-Seven Arts	Hy Averback (director); Paul Mazursky, Larry Tucker (screenplay); Peter Sellers, Jo Van Fleet, Leigh Taylor-Young, Joyce Van Patten, David Arkin, Herb Edelman, Salem Ludwig, Louis Gottlieb, Grady Sutton, Janet Clark, Jorge Moreno, Ed Peck, Eddra Gale, Sidney Clute, Roy Glenn, Joe Dominguez, William Bramley, Vince Howard, Hy Averback, Alma Beltran, George DeNormand, Uschi Digard, Ethelreda Leopold, Paul Mazursky, Julian Rivero, Larry Tucker, Felipe Turich	
O C T O B E R	9	Finian's Rainbow	Warner Bros.-Seven Arts	Francis Ford Coppola (director); E.Y. Harburg, Fred Saidy (screenplay); Fred Astaire, Petula Clark, Tommy Steele, Don Francks, Keenan Wynn, Barbara Hancock, Al Freeman Jr., Ronald Colby, Dolph Sweet, Wright King, Louil Silas, Roy Glenn, Jester Hairston, Vince Howard, Phyllis Kennedy, Avon Long	
O C T O B E R	9	If He Hollers, Let Him Go!	Cinerama Releasing Corporation / Forward Films	Charles Martin (director/screenplay); Dana Wynter, Raymond St. Jacques, Kevin McCarthy, Barbara McNair, John Russell, Ann Prentiss, Royal Dano, Steve Sandor, Susan Seaforth, James Craig, Arthur O'Connell, Gregg Palmer, Mimi Gibson, James McEachin, Frank Gerstle, Pepper Martin, Don Megowan, Jon Lormer	
O C T O B E R	13	The Subject Was Roses	Metro-Goldwyn-Mayer	Ulu Grosbard (director); Frank D. Gilroy (screenplay); Patricia Neal, Jack Albertson, Martin Sheen, Don Saxon, Elaine Williams, Grant Gordon	
O C T O B E R	14	Paper Lion	United Artists	Alex March (director); Lawrence Roman (screenplay); Alan Alda, Lauren Hutton, David Doyle, Ann Turkel, Fred J. Scollay, Joe Schmidt, Alex Karras, John Gordy, Mike Lucci, Pat Studstill, Bill McPeak, Jim Martin, Jim David, Chuck Knox, John North, Carl Brettschneider, Roger Brown, Lem Barney, Mike Weger, Karl Sweetan, Ron Kramer, Charles Bradshaw, Tom Vaughn, Bill Malinchak, Roger Shoals, Jerry Rush, Richard Lane, Ernie Clark, Mel Farr, Nick Eddy, John McCambridge, Bill Cottrell, Denis Moore, Darris McCord, Jerry Zawadzkas, John Henderson, Milt Plum, Tom Watkins, Amos Marsh, Mickey Walker, Rip Collins, Chuck Walton, Garo Yepremian, Wayne Rasmussen, Bruce Maher, David Kopay, Ron Goovert, Jim Gibbons, Ed Flanagan, Larry Hand, Frank Gallagher, Bob Kowalkowski, Paul Naumoff, Randy Winkler, John Robinson, Vince Lombardi, Frank Gifford, Sugar Ray Robinson, Ernie Harwell, Roy Scheider, Edward Winter	
O C T O B E R	16	The Boston Strangler	20th Century-Fox	Richard Fleischer (director); Edward Anhalt (screenplay); Tony Curtis, Henry Fonda, George Kennedy, Mike Kellin, Hurd Hatfield, Murray Hamilton, Jeff Corey, Sally Kellerman, William Marshall, George Voskovec, Leora Dana, Carolyn Conwell, Jeanne Cooper, Austin Willis, Lara Lindsay, George Furth, Richard X. Slattery, William Hickey, Gwyda Donhowe, Alex Dreier, John Cameron Swayze, Elizabeth Baur, James Brolin, George Tyne, Dana Elcar, William Traylor, Carole Shelley, Karen Huston, Enid Markey, Almira Sessions, Arthur Hanson, Tim Herbert, George Fisher, David Lewis, Tom Aldredge, Harry Carter, Linda Clifford, Larry Duran, Jack Garner, Chuck Hicks, George Holmes, Shep Houghton, Jack Hynes, Clint Kimbrough, Mike Lally, Sandy McPeak, Jack Perkins, David Proval, Alex Rocco, Edward Winter	
O C T O B E R	17	Bullitt	Warner Bros.-Seven Arts / Solar Productions	Peter Yates (director); Alan R. Trustman, Harry Kleiner (screenplay); Steve McQueen, Robert Vaughn, Jacqueline Bisset, Don Gordon, Robert Duvall, Simon Oakland, Norman Fell, Georg Stanford Brown, Justin Tarr, Carl Reindel, Felice Orlandi, Victor Tayback, Robert Lipton, Ed Peck, Pat Renella, Paul Genge, John Aprea, Al Checco, Bill Hickman, Scott Beach, Barbara Bosson, Roger Bowen, Brandy Carroll, Joanna Cassidy, Marjorie Eaton, Walker Edmiston, Sam Edwards, Frank Gerstle, Stacy Harris, Larry D. Mann, Vic Perrin, Suzanne Somers	
O C T O B E R	19	A Flea in Her Ear	20th Century-Fox	Jacques Charon (director); John Mortimer (screenplay); Rex Harrison, Rosemary Harris, Louis Jourdan, Rachel Roberts, John Williams, Grégoire Aslan, Edward Hardwicke, Georges Descrières, Isla Blair, Frank Thornton, Victor Sen Yung, Laurence Badie, Dominique Davray, Olivier Hussenot, Estella Blain, Moustache, David Horne, Roger Carel	
O C T O B E R	22	Star!	20th Century-Fox	Robert Wise (director); William Fairchild (screenplay); Julie Andrews, Richard Crenna, Michael Craig, Daniel Massey, Robert Reed, Bruce Forsyth, Beryl Reid, John Collin, Alan Oppenheimer, Richard Karlan, Garrett Lewis, Anthony Eisley, J. Pat O'Malley, Harvey Jason, Ian Abercrombie, Jenny Agutter, Philip Bailey, Conrad Bain, John Barrett, Cathleen Cordell, Don Crichton, Linda Dano, Charles Davis, Lisa Davis, Roger Delgado, Max Faulkner, Harry Fielder, Bernard Fox, Ray Girardin, Paul Harris, Joan Haythorne, Robin Hughes, Frank Jarvis, Pamela Kosh, Monte Landis, Anna Lee, Queenie Leonard, Tony Lo Bianco, Ysabel MacCloskey, Murray Matheson, Lester Matthews, William Mervyn, Clive Morton, Joe Ploski, Walter Reed, Robert Rietty, Dar Robinson, Mildred Shay, Frank Singuineau, Grady Sutton, Arthur Tovey, Dick Wilson, John Woodnutt, Gary Warren, Lynley Laurence, Jock Livingston, Matilda Calnan, Peter Church, Damien London, Marie Baker	
O C T O B E R	22	Vixen!	Coldstream Films / EVE Productions	Russ Meyer (director); Robert Rudelson (screenplay); Erica Gavin, Harrison Page, Garth Pillsbury, Jon Evans, Vincene Wallace, Robert Aiken, Michael Donovan O'Donnell, Peter Carpenter, John Furlong, Jackie Illman, Russ Meyer, Vic Perrin	
O C T O B E R	22	Voyage to the Planet of Prehistoric Women	AIP-TV / The Filmgroup	Peter Bogdanovich (director); Henry Ney (screenplay); Mamie Van Doren, Mary Marr, Paige Lee, Aldo Romani, Margot Hartman, Irene Orton, Pam Helton, Frankie Smith, James David, Judy Cowart, Roberto Martelli, Robin Smith, Cathie Reimer, Ralph Phillips, Murray Gerard, Adele Valentine, Peter Bogdanovich	
O C T O B E R	23	Live a Little, Love a Little	Metro-Goldwyn-Mayer	Norman Taurog (director); Michael A. Hoey, Dan Greenburg (screenplay); Elvis Presley, Michele Carey, Don Porter, Rudy Vallee, Dick Sargent, Sterling Holloway, Celeste Yarnall, Eddie Hodges, Joan Shawlee, Mary Grover, Emily Davis, Phyllis Davis, Mari Aldon, Russ Bender, Thordis Brandt, Lonnie Burr, Ann Doran, George Holmes, Marcia Mae Jones, Morgan Jones, Britt Lomond, Vernon Presley, Hal Riddle, Bartlett Robinson, Paul Sorensen, Red West, John Wheeler	
O C T O B E R	24	Ice Station Zebra	Metro-Goldwyn-Mayer / Filmways	John Sturges (director); Douglas Heyes, Harry Julian Fink, W.R. Burnett (screenplay); Rock Hudson, Ernest Borgnine, Patrick McGoohan, Jim Brown, Tony Bill, Lloyd Nolan, Alf Kjellin, Gerald S. O'Loughlin, Ted Hartley, Murray Rose, Ron Masak, Sherwood Price, Lee Stanley, Joseph Bernard, John Orchard, William O'Connell, Jonathan Lippe, Ronnie Rondell Jr., Jed Allan, Lloyd Haynes, Buddy Hart, Bill Hillman, James Jeter	
O C T O B E R	30	The Lion in Winter	Avco Embassy Pictures / Haworth Productions	Anthony Harvey (director); James Goldman (screenplay); Peter O'Toole, Katharine Hepburn, Jane Merrow, John Castle, Timothy Dalton, Anthony Hopkins, Nigel Terry, Nigel Stock, Kenneth Griffith, Kenneth Ives, O.Z. Whitehead, Henry Woolf	
O C T O B E R	31	They Came to Rob Las Vegas	Warner Bros.-Seven Arts	Antonio Isasi-Isasmendi (director/screenplay); Lluis Josep Cameron, Jorge Illa, Jo Eisinger (screenplay); Gary Lockwood, Elke Sommer, Lee J. Cobb, Jean Servais, Georges Géret, Jack Palance, Fabrizio Capucci, Roger Hanin, Gustavo Re, Daniel Martín, Maurizio Arena, Gérard Tichy, Rubén Rojo, Armand Mestral, George Rigaud, Luis Barboo, Antonio Casas, Ann Prentiss, Lorenzo Robledo, Enrique Ávila, Fernando Hilbeck, José Marco, Beni Deus, Julio Pérez Tabernero	
N O V E M B E R	6	Head	Columbia Pictures / Raybert Productions	Bob Rafelson (director/screenplay); Jack Nicholson (screenplay); The Monkees, Victor Mature, Annette Funicello, Timothy Carey, Logan Ramsey, Abraham Sofaer, Vito Scotti, Charles Macaulay, T. C. Jones, Percy Helton, Sonny Liston, Ray Nitschke, Carol Doda, Frank Zappa, June Fairchild, Terry Garr, Rona Barrett, Toni Basil, Chelsea Brown, Sam Flint, Dennis Hopper, Helena Kallianiotes, Lee Kolima, Tanya Lemani, Ngoc Loan Nguyen, Van Lem Nguyen, Jack Nicholson, The Radio City Rockettes, Bob Rafelson, Ronald Reagan, Jo Anne Worley, Charles Irving, William Bagdad, I.J. Jefferson, Terry Chambers, Mike Burns, Esther Shepard, Kristine Helstoski, John Hoffman, Linda Weaver, Jim Hanley	
N O V E M B E R	13	Killers Three	American International Pictures / Dick Clark Productions	Bruce Kessler (director); Dick Clark, Michael Fisher (screenplay); Robert Walker Jr., Diane Varsi, Dick Clark, Norman Alden, Maureen Arthur, Merle Haggard, Bonnie Owens, John Cardos, Beach Dickerson	
N O V E M B E R	13	Yellow Submarine	United Artists / Apple Films / King Features Syndicate / TVC London	George Dunning (director); Lee Minoff, Al Brodax, Jack Mendelsohn, Erich Segal (screenplay); The Beatles (voices), Paul Angelis, John Clive, Dick Emery, Geoffrey Hughes, Lance Percival, Peter Batten	
N O V E M B E R	15	The Shoes of the Fisherman	Metro-Goldwyn-Mayer	Michael Anderson (director); John Patrick, James Kennaway (screenplay); Anthony Quinn, Laurence Olivier, Oskar Werner, David Janssen, Vittorio De Sica, Leo McKern, John Gielgud, Barbara Jefford, Rosemary Dexter, Frank Finlay, Burt Kwouk, Arnoldo Foà, Paul Rogers, George Pravda, Clive Revill, Niall MacGinnis, Marne Maitland, Isa Miranda, Gerald Harper, Leopoldo Trieste, Peter Copley, Arthur Howard, Jean Rougeul, Ake Lindman	
N O V E M B E R	16	The Legend of Lylah Clare	Metro-Goldwyn-Mayer / Associates & Aldrich Company	Robert Aldrich (director); Hugo Butler, Jean Rouverol (screenplay); Kim Novak, Peter Finch, Ernest Borgnine, Milton Selzer, Rossella Falk, Gabriele Tinti, Valentina Cortese, Jean Carroll, Michael Murphy, Coral Browne, Lee Meriwether, James Lanphier, Robert Ellenstein, Nick Dennis, Dave Willock, Ellen Corby, Michael Fox, Queenie Smith, Sidney Skolsky, John Alvin, Ernest Anderson, William Beckley, Noble "Kid" Chissell, Robert Cornthwaite, Billy Curtis, Duke Fishman, Joe Gray, Rex Holman, John Indrisano, George Kennedy, Walter Maslow, Dick McAuliffe, James McEachin, Dick Miller, Joe Ploski, Cosmo Sardo, Max Wagner, Victoria Zinny	
N O V E M B E R	18	House of Cards	Universal Pictures / Westward Films	John Guillermin (director); Irving Ravetch, Harriet Frank Jr. (screenplay); George Peppard, Inger Stevens, Orson Welles, Keith Michell, Maxine Audley, Peter Bayliss, Patience Collier, Ave Ninchi, Renzo Palmer, Francesco Mulé, Rosemarie Dexter, Perrette Pradier, Geneviève Cluny, Jean Hébey, Nello Pazzafini, William Job, Barnaby Shaw, Raoul Delfosse, James Mishler, Jean Louis, Jacques Roux	
N O V E M B E R	20	Lady in Cement	20th Century-Fox / Arcola Pictures	Gordon Douglas (director); Marvin H. Albert, Jack Guss (screenplay); Frank Sinatra, Raquel Welch, Dan Blocker, Richard Conte, Martin Gabel, Lainie Kazan, Pat Henry, Richard Deacon, Alex Stevens, Steve Peck, Robert "Buzz" Henry, Joe E. Lewis, Jilly Rizzo, Chris Robinson, Bunny Yeager	
N O V E M B E R	24	Faces	Continental Distributing	John Cassavetes (director/screenplay); John Marley, Gena Rowlands, Lynn Carlin, Fred Draper, Seymour Cassel, Val Avery, Dorothy Gulliver, Darlene Conley, George Dunn, Jim Bridges, Christina Crawford, Midge Ware, Don Siegel, Joanne Moore Jordan, Gene Darfier, Elizabeth Deering	
N O V E M B E R	27	Hellfighters	Universal Pictures	Andrew V. McLaglen (director); Clair Huffaker (screenplay); John Wayne, Katharine Ross, Jim Hutton, Vera Miles, Jay C. Flippen, Bruce Cabot, Edward Faulkner, Barbara Stuart, Edmund Hashim, Valentin de Vargas, Frances Fong, Alan Caillou, Laraine Stephens, John Alderson, Lal Chand Mehra, William Hardy, Cactus Pryor, Big John Hamilton, Edward Colmans, Pedro Gonzalez Gonzalez, Shep Houghton, Ethelreda Leopold, Chuck Roberson, John Stephenson, Alberto Morin, Howard Finch	
N O V E M B E R	30	The Shakiest Gun in the West	Universal Pictures	Alan Rafkin (director); Jim Fritzell, Everett Greenbaum (screenplay); Don Knotts, Barbara Rhoades, Jackie Coogan, Donald Barry, Ruth McDevitt, Frank McGrath, Terry Wilson, Carl Ballantine, Pat Morita, Herbert Voland, Dub Taylor, Hope Summers, Dick Wilson, Vaughn Taylor, Ed Peck, Edward Faulkner, Arthur Space, Gregory Mullavy, Fred Aldrich, E.J. Andre, John Aniston, Phil Arnold, Jim Boles, Argentina Brunetti, Claudia Bryar, Paul Bryar, Wendell Burton, Albert Cavens, Noble "Kid" Chissell, William Christopher, Frank Coghlan Jr., Bill Coontz, Myron Healey, Clyde Howdy, Anthony Jochim, I. Stanford Jolley, Ray Kellogg, Karen Knotts, Gil Lamb, Barbara Luddy, Kathryn Minner, Peggy Mondo, King Moody, Burt Mustin, Stuart Nisbet, Eddie Quillan, Bill Quinn, Teddy Quinn, Rodd Redwing, Benny Rubin, Naomi Stevens, Boyd Stockman, Leonard Stone, Lorna Thayer	
D E C E M B E R	1	The Green Slime	Metro-Goldwyn-Mayer / Toei Company / Ram Films / Southern Cross Film Company	Kinji Fukasaku (director); Bill Finger, Tom Rowe, Charles Sinclair (screenplay); Robert Horton, Richard Jaeckel, Luciana Paluzzi, Bud Widom, Ted Gunther, Robert Dunham, David Yorston, William Ross, Gary Randolf, Linda Jo Miller, Patricia Elliott	
D E C E M B E R	4	Where Eagles Dare	Metro-Goldwyn-Mayer / Winkast Film Productions	Brian G. Hutton (director); Alistair MacLean (screenplay); Richard Burton, Clint Eastwood, Mary Ure, Patrick Wymark, Michael Hordern, Donald Houston, Peter Barkworth, William Squire, Robert Beatty, Brook Williams, Neil McCarthy, Vincent Ball, Anton Diffring, Ferdy Mayne, Derren Nesbitt, Victor Beaumont, Ingrid Pitt, Richard Beale, Ivor Dean, Guy Deghy, Jim Dowdall, Max Faulkner, Harry Fielder, Nigel Lambert, Olga Lowe, Ian McCulloch, Derek Newark, Anton Rodgers, Philip Stone, Fred Wood	
D E C E M B E R	10	Buona Sera, Mrs. Campbell	United Artists / A Melvin Frank Film / Connaught Productions, Inc.	Melvin Frank (director/screenplay); Denis Norden, Sheldon Keller (screenplay); Gina Lollobrigida, Shelley Winters, Phil Silvers, Peter Lawford, Telly Savalas, Lee Grant, Janet Margolin, Philippe Leroy, Marian Moses, Naomi Stevens, Renzo Palmer, Giovanna Galletti, James Mishler, Dale Cummings, Pietro Tordi	
D E C E M B E R	12	The Killing of Sister George	Cinerama Releasing Corporation / Palomar Pictures / Associates & Aldrich Company	Robert Aldrich (director); Lukas Heller (screenplay); Beryl Reid, Susannah York, Coral Browne, Ronald Fraser, Patricia Medina, Cyril Delevanti, Hugh Paddick, Meier Tzelniker, William Beckley, Jack Raine, Sam Kydd, Joe Gray, Derek Partridge, Velvet Rhodes, Madeline Smith, Byron Webster, Brendan Dillon, Sivi Aberg, Rosalie Williams, Elaine Church, Mike Freeman, Cicely Walper, Maggie Paige, Dolly Taylor	
D E C E M B E R	13	Shalako	Cinerama Releasing Corporation / Palomar Pictures International / Kingston Film Productions, Ltd. / CCC Film	Edward Dmytryk (director); J.J. Griffith, Hal Cooper (screenplay); Sean Connery, Brigitte Bardot, Stephen Boyd, Jack Hawkins, Peter van Eyck, Honor Blackman, Woody Strode, Eric Sykes, Alexander Knox, Valerie French, Julián Mateos, Donald Barry, Rodd Redwing, Walter Brown	
D E C E M B E R	15	Greetings	Sigma III / West End Films	Brian De Palma (director/screenplay); Charles Hirsch (screenplay); Robert De Niro, Gerrit Graham, Richard Hamilton, Bettina Kugel, Peter Maloney, Ruth Alda, Allen Garfield, Roz Kelly, Brian De Palma, Jonathan Warden, Megan McCormick, Jack Cowley, Jane Lee Salmons, Ashley Oliver, Melvin Morgulis, Cynthia Peltz, Ted Lescault, Mona Feit, M. Dobish, Richard Landis, Carol Patton, Sara Jo-Edlin, Ray Tuttle, Tisa Chiang	
D E C E M B E R	17	Candy	Cinerama Releasing Corporation / Selmur Pictures / Dear Film / Les Films Corona	Christian Marquand (director); Buck Henry (screenplay); Ewa Aulin, Charles Aznavour, Marlon Brando, Richard Burton, James Coburn, John Huston, Walter Matthau, Ringo Starr, John Astin, Elsa Martinelli, Sugar Ray Robinson, Anita Pallenberg, Lea Padovani, Florinda Bolkan, Marilù Tolo, Nicoletta Machiavelli, Umberto Orsini, Enrico Maria Salerno, Enzo Fiermonte, Joey Forman, Fabian Dean, Christian Marquand, Buck Henry, Judith Malina, Julian Beck, International Velvet	
D E C E M B E R	18	Chitty Chitty Bang Bang	United Artists / Warfield Productions / Dramatic Features	Ken Hughes (director/screenplay); Roald Dahl (screenplay); Dick Van Dyke, Sally Ann Howes, Lionel Jeffries, Gert Fröbe, Anna Quayle, Benny Hill, James Robertson Justice, Robert Helpmann, Heather Ripley, Adrian Hall, Barbara Windsor, Davy Kaye, Alexander Doré, Bernard Spear, Stanley Unwin, Peter Arne, Desmond Llewelyn, Victor Maddern, Arthur Mullard, Totti Truman Taylor, Larry Taylor, Max Bacon, Max Wall, Michael Darbyshire, Kenneth Waller, Vic Armstrong, Michael Audreson, Phil Collins, Sadie Corre, Cyril Cross, Gabrielle Daye, Liz English, Harry Fielder, Henry Gibson, George Leech, Dickie Owen, Richard Wattis	
D E C E M B E R	18	Hell in the Pacific	Cinerama Releasing Corporation / Selmur Pictures / Henry G. Saperstein Enterprises	John Boorman (director); Reuben Bercovitch, Alexander Jacobs, Eric Bercovici (screenplay); Lee Marvin, Toshirō Mifune	
D E C E M B E R	18	The Night They Raided Minsky's	United Artists / Tandem Productions	William Friedkin (director); Norman Lear, Sidney Michaels, Arnold Schulman (screenplay); Jason Robards, Britt Ekland, Norman Wisdom, Forrest Tucker, Harry Andrews, Joseph Wiseman, Denholm Elliott, Elliott Gould, Jack Burns, Bert Lahr, Richard Libertini, Gloria LeRoy, Judith Lowry, Chanin Hale, Lillian Hayman, Rudy Vallee, Herbie Faye	
D E C E M B E R	18	Uptight	Paramount Pictures / Marlukin Productions	Jules Dassin (director/screenplay); Ruby Dee, Julian Mayfield (screenplay); Raymond St. Jacques, Ruby Dee, Frank Silvera, Roscoe Lee Browne, Julian Mayfield, Janet MacLachlan, Max Julien, Juanita Moore, Dick Anthony Williams, Ji-Tu Cumbuka, John Wesley, Ketty Lester, Robert DoQui, Isabel Cooley, Alice Childress, Leon Bibb, James McEachin, Jesse Jackson, Anthony Chisholm, William Elliott, Joel Fluellen, Leonard Jackson, Alan Oppenheimer, Bill Walker	
D E C E M B E R	19	Skidoo	Paramount Pictures / Sigma Productions	Otto Preminger (director); Doran William Cannon (screenplay); Jackie Gleason, Carol Channing, Frankie Avalon, Fred Clark, Michael Constantine, Frank Gorshin, John Phillip Law, Peter Lawford, Burgess Meredith, George Raft, Cesar Romero, Mickey Rooney, Groucho Marx, Arnold Stang, Doro Merande, Phil Arnold, Slim Pickens, Robert Donner, Richard Kiel, Stacy King, Renny Roker, Roman Gabriel, Nilsson, The Orange County Ramblers, Austin Pendleton, Alexandra Hay, Luna, Timothy Leary, Doran William Cannon, George Cisar, Sammy Davis Jr., Duke Fishman, Joe Ploski, Otto Preminger, Joe Pyne, Tom Law, Jaik Rosenstein, Stone Country	
D E C E M B E R	20	The Horse in the Gray Flannel Suit	Walt Disney Productions / Buena Vista Distribution	Norman Tokar (director); Louis Pelletier (screenplay); Dean Jones, Diane Baker, Lloyd Bochner, Fred Clark, Ellen Janov, Morey Amsterdam, Kurt Russell, Lurene Tuttle, Alan Hewitt, Frederico Piñero, Florence MacMichael, Joan Marshall, Robin Eccles, Adam Williams, Norman Grabowski, John Cliff, Jimmy Cross, George Holmes, Shep Houghton, John Indrisano, Gil Lamb, Murray Pollock, Cosmo Sardo, Paul Smith, Nydia Westman	
D E C E M B E R	20	Three in the Attic	American International Pictures / Hermes Productions	Richard Wilson (director); Stephen Yafa (screenplay); Christopher Jones, Yvette Mimieux, Judy Pace, Maggie Thrett, Nan Martin, John Beck, Eve McVeagh, Reva Rose, Richard Derr, Honey Alden, Tom Ahearne	
D E C E M B E R	21	Once Upon a Time in the West	Paramount Pictures / Euro International Films / Rafran Cinematografica / Finanzia San Marco	Sergio Leone (director/screenplay); Sergio Donati (screenplay); Claudia Cardinale, Henry Fonda, Jason Robards, Charles Bronson, Gabriele Ferzetti, Paolo Stoppa, Woody Strode, Jack Elam, Keenan Wynn, Frank Wolff, Lionel Stander, Frank Braña, Luigi Ciavarro, Bruno Corazzari, Takis Emmanuel, Don Galloway, Robert Hossein, Raffaella Leone, Luigi Magnani, Claudio Mancini, Antonio Molino Rojo, Al Mulock, Ricardo Palacios, Lorenzo Robledo, Aldo Sambrell, Conrado San Martin, Claudio Scarchilli, Benito Stefanelli, Simonetta Stefanelli, Luana Strode, Fabio Testi	
D E C E M B E R	22	The Sea Gull	Warner Bros.-Seven Arts / Sidney Lumet Productions	Sidney Lumet (director); Moura Budberg (screenplay); James Mason, Vanessa Redgrave, Simone Signoret, David Warner, Harry Andrews, Denholm Elliott, Eileen Herlie, Alfred Lynch, Ronald Radd, Kathleen Widdoes, Frej Lindqvist	
D E C E M B E R	24	The Love Bug	Walt Disney Productions	Robert Stevenson (director); Bill Walsh, Don DaGradi (screenplay); Dean Jones, Michele Lee, David Tomlinson, Buddy Hackett, Joe Flynn, Benson Fong, Joe E. Ross, Barry Kelley, Iris Adrian, Andy Granatelli, Ned Glass, Robert Foulk, Gil Lamb, Nicole Jaffe, Wally Boag, Peter Renaday, Gary Owens, Chick Hearn, Pedro Gonzalez Gonzalez, Dale Van Sickel, Bill Hickman, Dick Warlock, Robert Hoy, Jock Mahoney, Bud Ekins, Robert James, Fred Krone, Jesse Wayne, Jack Perkins, Fred Stromsoe, Ronnie Rondell Jr., Larry J. Blake, John Cliff, George Holmes, Allen Jung, Carey Loftin, Kathryn Minner, Bing Russell, Herb Vigran, Russ Caldwell, Brian Fong	
D E C E M B E R	25	Assignment to Kill	Warner Bros.-Seven Arts / William Conrad Productions	Sheldon Reynolds (director/screenplay); Patrick O'Neal, Joan Hackett, John Gielgud, Herbert Lom, Eric Portman, Peter van Eyck, Oskar Homolka, Leon Greene, Kent Smith, Philip Ober, Fifi D'Orsay, Éva Szörényi, Martin Miller, Ann Prentiss, Sheb Wooley	
D E C E M B E R	25	The Brotherhood	Paramount Pictures / Bryna Productions / The Brotherhood Company	Martin Ritt (director); Lewis John Carlino (screenplay); Kirk Douglas, Alex Cord, Irene Papas, Luther Adler, Susan Strasberg, Murray Hamilton, Eduardo Ciannelli, Joe De Santis, Val Avery, Val Bisoglio, Alan Hewitt, Barry Primus, Frank Albanese, Hal Holbrook, Anthony Marciona, Paul Reubens, Margot Stevenson, Connie Scott, Michele Cimarosa, Louis Badolati	
D E C E M B E R	25	The Sergeant	Warner Bros.-Seven Arts / Robert Wise Productions	John Flynn (director); Dennis Murphy (screenplay); Rod Steiger, John Phillip Law, Ludmila Mikaël, Frank Latimore, Elliott Sullivan, Memphis Slim, Nadine Alari, Gabriel Gascon, Ronald Rubin, Philip Roye, Jerry Brouer	
D E C E M B E R	25	The Stalking Moon	National General Pictures / Pakula-Mulligan Productions	Robert Mulligan (director); Alvin Sargent (screenplay); Gregory Peck, Eva Marie Saint, Robert Forster, Noland Clay, Russell Thorson, Frank Silvera, Lonny Chapman, Lou Frizzell, Henry Beckman, Charles Tyner, Richard Bull, Sandy Brown Wyeth, Joaquín Martínez, Boyd "Red" Morgan, Nathaniel Narcisco, Richard Farnsworth, James Olson	
D E C E M B E R	26	Monterey Pop	Leacock-Pennebaker	D. A. Pennebaker (director); The Mamas & the Papas, Canned Heat, Simon & Garfunkel, Hugh Masekela, Jefferson Airplane, Big Brother and the Holding Company, Janis Joplin, The Animals, The Who, Country Joe and the Fish, Otis Redding, The Jimi Hendrix Experience, Ravi Shankar, Booker T. & the M.G.s, David Crosby, Micky Dolenz, Brian Jones, Laura Nyro, Johnny Rivers, Tom Smothers, Carol Wayne	
D E C E M B E R	26	Krakatoa, East of Java	Cinerama Releasing Corporation	Bernard L. Kowalski (director); Maximilian Schell, Diane Baker, Brian Keith	

== See also ==
- List of 1968 box office number-one films in the United States
- AFI Catalog of Feature Films
- 1968 in the United States
