= The Helicopter Spies =

- Directed by: Boris Sagal
- Written by: Dean Hargrove
- Produced by: Anthony Spinner
- Starring: Robert Vaughn; David McCallum; Carol Lynley; Bradford Dillman; Lola Albright; Leo G. Carroll; John Dehner; John Carradine; Julie London
- Cinematography: Fred Koenekamp
- Edited by: Joseph Dervin; John Baxter Rogers
- Music by: Richard Shores
- Production company: Metro-Goldwyn-Mayer
- Distributed by: Metro-Goldwyn-Mayer
- Release date: June 21, 1968
- Running time: 90 minutes
- Country: United States
- Language: English

The Helicopter Spies is a 1968 feature-length film version of The Man from U.N.C.L.E.'s fourth season two-part episode "The Prince of Darkness Affair". The episodes were originally broadcast in the United States on October 2, 1967, and October 9, 1967, on NBC. Like the television series, it stars Robert Vaughn and David McCallum. It is the seventh such feature film that used as its basis a reedited version of one or more episodes from the series. The film was directed by Boris Sagal and written by Dean Hargrove. Carol Lynley, Bradford Dillman, Lola Albright, John Dehner, Julie London, H.M. Wynant and Roy Jenson also star in the film.

== Synopsis ==
U.N.C.L.E. agents Napoleon Solo and Illya Kuryakin witness the aerial destruction wrought on an African village by Dr. Kharmusi using his newly developed “thermal prism”. U.N.C.L.E. then seeks out notorious safe cracker (and former thermal prism researcher himself) Luther Sebastian to help them obtain the device from Dr. Kharmusi. Sebastian is on an island among a religious group called “The Third Way”, a mystical organization with disciples having – except for Sebastian – platinum white hair and all having a belief that when the “Old Man” in their group finally speaks after twenty years of silence The Third Way will have dominion over the world. Wanted in nearly two dozen countries Sebastian agrees to leave the island and help U.N.C.L.E. in return for world-wide immunity from prosecution.

Solo makes his way to Dr. Kharmusi’s fortress but is initially delayed by Annie and her friend Aksoy. She feels that Sebastian can help free her fiancé and Aksoy’s brother, both of whom were unjustly imprisoned because of Sebastian. However, Dr. Kharmusi’s wife Azalea betrays her husband, kills Aksoy, abandons Annie, and helps Solo get into the fortress. Unfortunately for Solo, Annie follows him and, claiming to be his wife, gains access herself.

Despite the setback, Solo locates the safe and informs Kuryakin and Sebastian (who separately made their way to the roof). Sebastian steals the prism - from a safe he himself designed - while Solo and Azalea are caught and tortured in a room slowly filling with sand. Kuryakin rescues them, but a brief fight results in Dr. Kharmusi’s death. His death automatically triggers a self-destruct device in his fortress, so the U.N.C.L.E. group flees the area immediately with the prism.

Safely outside the blast radius, Sebastian reveals that he and Azalea (a priestess of The Third Way) have been working together and the entire course of events has been his plan. They felt they could only steal the device with U.N.C.L.E.’s help and explain that by launching the thermal prism into orbit they can get countries to pay protection money of any amount. Sebastian then traps Solo, Kuryakin and Annie on a boat placed on a collision course with the extraction ship. Escaping moments before the craft is destroyed by a defensively fired torpedo, the group is picked up and taken back to U.N.C.L.E. headquarters in New York.

Regrouping, Solo leaves to speak to Sebastian’s wife Laurie in Los Angeles. She denies knowing where Sebastian is, but as soon as Solo leaves, she phones Sebastian at his launch facility. Sebastian orders Solo killed, but Solo instead kills his white-haired attackers. He adopts white coloring in his hair, takes the place of one of the men he killed, and reports in with other similar men for a briefing where Sebastian says their mission is to steal a U.S. rocket. Solo thereafter distinguishes himself by helping the group steal the rocket from a train.

Kuryakin meanwhile follows up on a lead from Solo and investigates a suspicious connection between Sebastian and an abandoned theater in Los Angeles. Followed by Annie and an identical brother of Askoy, Kuryakin discovers that the theater is hosting a status briefing for followers of The Third Way. They are then all captured, but Askoy’s brother is killed by an ejector seat along the highway. Sebastian then remotely triggers a gas release that kills all the white-haired party goers except for Solo, who barely escapes and meets a third identical Askoy brother.

Solo returns to Laurie and tricks her into contacting Sebastian. Tracing the call, U.N.C.L.E. discovers the local building from which Sebastian’s launch facility is hidden. Askoy’s third brother and Solo infiltrate the building. After a battle in which the Askoy brother dies, Sebastian falls through an open hatch in the rocket and is launched along with it. U.N.C.L.E. reinforcements arrive, the rocket self-destructs, and the “old man” dies without having spoken. Back at U.N.C.L.E. headquarters, Annie discovers from a fourth identical Askoy brother that her fiancé, though released from prison thanks to U.N.C.L.E., had changed his mind about marriage. Annie and Askoy’s fourth brother thereafter walk out arm in arm.

== Cast ==
- Robert Vaughn as Napoleon Solo
- David McCallum as Illya Kuryakin
- Carol Lynley as Annie
- Bradford Dillman as Luther Sebastian
- Lola Albright as Azalea Kharmusi
- Leo G. Carroll as Alexander Waverly
- John Dehner as Dr. Kharmusi
- John Carradine as Third Way Priest
- Julie London as Laurie Sebastian
- H.M. Wynant as The Aksoy Brothers
- Roy Jenson as Carl
- Kathleen Freeman as Mom
- Barbara Moore as Lisa Rogers
- Sid Haig as Alex
- Thordis Brandt as Miss Zalamar

== Production ==
The first four The Man from U.N.C.L.E. feature films made significant changes and additions to the episodes from which they were drawn. This movie, like the two immediately before it (The Spy in the Green Hat and The Karate Killers), makes relatively minimal changes to the episodes. No major scenes were added or removed, and very few trims were made to fit the episodes into the running time of the film. As with the prior movies, though, musical cues and accompanying music was sometimes changed. Also changed were two short scenes that became slightly more risqué than generally shown on American network television at the time: in two scenes, a shirtless man is in Laurie Sebastian (Julie London)’s bed; in the TV version she is alone. Other minor changes included: a few changed camera angles, some enhanced higher-quality stock footage scenes of a rocket launch at the end, a little more physical contact between Luther Sebastian (Bradford Dillman) and his female assistant Miss Zalamar (Thordis Brandt), an insert of a swinging ax, and a very short scene missing from the television episode showing Napoleon Solo (Robert Vaughn) slipping loose ropes that were binding him while escaping from a boat. When compared to the prior six films, though, this came the closest to simply showing the TV episode intact.

== Release ==
Like most of the later U.N.C.L.E. films, The Helicopter Spies was not released theatrically in the US, though it had a wide release internationally. It premiered in London at the Ritz theater on February 22, 1968, a month after the final episode of the series aired in the U.S.

== Home media ==
The film was released on DVD on November 2, 2011 by Warner Archive Collection.

== See also ==
- List of American films of 1968
