= The Good Guys and the Bad Guys =

1969 film by Burt Kennedy

- Film poster
- Directed by: Burt Kennedy
- Written by: Ronald M. Cohen; Dennis Shryack
- Produced by: Ronald M. Cohen; Dennis Shryack
- Starring: Robert Mitchum; George Kennedy; Martin Balsam; David Carradine; Tina Louise
- Cinematography: Harry Stradling, Jr.
- Edited by: Howard Deane
- Music by: William Lava
- Distributed by: Warner Bros.-Seven Arts
- Release date: October 8, 1969 (Los Angeles)
- Running time: 91 minutes
- Country: United States
- Language: English

The Good Guys and the Bad Guys is a 1969 American comedy Western film directed by Burt Kennedy. It stars Robert Mitchum and George Kennedy.

== Plot ==
Jim Flagg is the marshal in the town of Progress. He is surprised to hear from his own hermit buddy Grundy that a gang of outlaws has been making their way towards town. Flagg is surprised to learn that one of the members fits the description of his old arch-rival Big John McKay, who he thought had been killed in a shootout years back. Flagg goes to warn Mayor Wilker, a typical cheap politician, and others in Progress about rumors of an impending train robbery. Wilker doesn't appreciate Flagg causing a panic, as he is trying to promote Progress as a respected city representing the future. That night, Wilker arranges a surprise "retirement" party for Flagg, where he relieves him of his job and badge as part of "congratulating" him for his years of service.

Despite this, Flagg sets out on his own and discovers McKay is alive and has joined up with a band of youthful outlaws. After being taken prisoner, Flagg escapes death thanks to McKay's intervention, even as it is clear that McKay has been usurped as gang leader by the younger and more forceful Waco. Alone, Flagg and McKay hash out old wounds as Flagg recounts how McKay had escaped Flagg's custody, knocking him out cold when Flagg was going to turn McKay in. McKay, in turn, says that he only promised, but didn't give his word, that he wouldn't try to escape, insisting that "the sun never set on a day that Big John broke his word to a friend or an enemy". The two get into a fistfight as Flagg tries to arrest him. The fight is only broken up when Big John is knocked out by Grundy, who had secretly been following Flagg.

Taken back to town, Flagg puts McKay in a boarding house run by Mary, a widow. Despite McKay's appearance, the mayor and town folks don't take the threat seriously. Flagg and McKay meanwhile catch up on old times, with Flagg surprised to learn that after faking his death, McKay ended up marrying a woman and having a son. Tragically, McKay's wife later passed away and, with his return to the outlaw life, McKay has not seen his son since. Both McKay and Flagg lament how much things have changed, right down to how much more cold-blooded typical gunfighters and outlaws have become compared to their old days.

That night, Waco and the rest of McKay's gang enter the local saloon to enjoy themselves the night before the robbery. Absent Waco, the other boys start to act rowdy. Grundy, having a drink at the saloon, tries to defend a woman who is being assaulted by one of the gang and ends up shot in the back by Deuce, one of the gang members.

Heartbroken at the death of his friend, Flagg resolves to stop the robbery, badge or no badge. McKay, equally disgusted at his gang having crossed the line in shooting and killing a man in the back, teams with Flagg to stop their plans. The outlaws intend to rob the train before it arrives at the town bank when it stops at the station. Flagg and McKay board the train before it reaches town. Although they are initially detained by on-board security inside a privy, they are able to break free. They climb into the locomotive cab and take the crew hostage. The train does not stop at the station and passes into town.

Mayor Wilker and a band of townspeople chase after the train. The outlaws, upon realizing the train has not stopped, also chase after it. McKay uncouples the front cars of the train from the rear passenger coaches, overtaking the outlaws. The train approaches a section of broken track over a cliff and is too fast to stop in time. Flagg, McKay, and the workers bail out before it plunges off the cliff and explodes.

The outlaws catch up and rob the burning train compartments. Flagg and McKay ambush them and kill most of them in the ensuing gunfight. McKay meets Waco as he is about to escape. Waco manages to wound McKay, who then shoots him dead. McKay remarks to Flagg, "I thought I could beat him [Waco]" to which Flagg replies "You did beat him."

Mayor Wilker arrives and expresses his gratitude to the two for saving the town and hence his reputation as a mayor. When interviewed by a press journalist, Wilker is asked whether he would consider running for state governor. He is delighted to consider the prospect. McKay remarks that Wilker really could "become president one day."

The new town marshal asks Flagg to take back his badge for his heroic deed, but he turns down the opportunity. He gives one piece of advice to Boyle that in order to be successful, "You have to learn to tell the good guys from the bad guys."

The film ends on a humorous note as Flagg arrests McKay and handcuffs him, to resume his plans to turn him in, despite McKay's protests. He reassures McKay that helping stop the robbery will probably get him a reduced sentence, but (referring to their earlier fight), Flagg insists that "the sun will never set on a day that James Flagg broke his word to a friend or an enemy." McKay, in turn, promises that the first chance he gets, he will knock Flagg out again and escape as he had years before.

== Cast ==
- Robert Mitchum as Marshall Jim Flagg
- George Kennedy as John McKay
- Martin Balsam as Mayor Wilker
- David Carradine as Waco
- Tina Louise as Carmel
- Lois Nettleton as Mary
- John Carradine as Ticker
- Marie Windsor as Polly
- Buddy Hackett as Ed (uncredited)
- Douglas Fowley as Grundy
- John Davis Chandler as Deuce
- Dick Peabody as Howard Boyle
- Kathleen Freeman as Mrs. Stone (Mother)
- Jimmy Murphy as Buckshot
- Garrett Lewis as Hawkins
- Nick Dennis as Engineer #2
- Dorothy Adams as Mrs. Pierce (uncredited)
- Robert Anderson as Jed (uncredited)
- Jimmy Booth as Wagon Driver (uncredited)
- Nick Borgani as Townsman (uncredited)
- Danny Borzage as Accordionist (uncredited)
- Paul Bradley as Barfly (uncredited)
- Thordis Brandt as Babe (uncredited)
- David Cargo as David Cargo - reporter (uncredited)
- David S. Cass Sr. as Tuber (uncredited)
- Noble "Kid" Chissell as Townsman (uncredited)
- George Dunn as Engineer #1 (uncredited)
- John Fritz as Townsman (uncredited)
- Bobby Gilbert as Boarding house guest (uncredited)
- Angela Greene as Judy (uncredited)
- Darby Hinton as Pug (uncredited)
- Jackie Joseph as Doris (uncredited)
- Irene Kelly as Ginny (uncredited)
- Kenner G. Kemp as Saloon Dealer (uncredited)
- Alan Lee as Townsman (uncredited)
- Stuart Lee as Townsman (uncredited)
- Paul Lees as Miles (uncredited)

== Production ==
The movie was filmed on location in Chama, New Mexico, and other locations in New Mexico, Thousand Oaks, California, Silverton, Colorado, and Warner Bros. Studios Burbank.

== Reception ==
Howard Thompson of The New York Times said, "Whatever possessed these three actors [Mitchum, Kennedy and Balsam] to amble through such a dinky prairie oyster stumps us. And so does the uncertain tone of the picture, methodically directed by Burt Kennedy, which only toward the end asserts itself, clearly and lamely, as a good-natured spoof." Variety wrote that the film "provides what in today's market is acceptable family fare, laughs overshadowing the serious moments." Roger Ebert gave the film 2.5 stars out of 4, calling it "a fairly good Western but not good enough." Gene Siskel of the Chicago Tribune also gave it 2.5 stars out of 4, calling it "a pleasant enough oater that is low on violence and drama. It won't offend a soul, and is merely made for that catch-all evaluation, 'decent entertainment.'" Charles Champlin of the Los Angeles Times called the film "slow, gross, heavy-handed, neither funny nor sweetly sad." Gary Arnold of The Washington Post wrote, "Burt Kennedy's direction of this hokum is lively and likeable, but I'd prefer an older sort of hokum: Western melodrama with comic interludes or undercurrents, like 'Ride the High Country' and 'True Grit' at its infrequent best and William Wyler's 'The Westerner,' rather than deliberate, gratuitous spoofing."

== See also ==
- List of American films of 1969
