= Lady in Cement =

1968 film by Gordon Douglas

- Theatrical release poster
- Directed by: Gordon Douglas
- Screenplay by: Marvin H. Albert; Jack Guss
- Based on: The Lady in Cement; 1961 novel by Marvin H. Albert
- Produced by: Aaron Rosenberg
- Starring: Frank Sinatra; Raquel Welch; Dan Blocker; Richard Conte; Martin Gabel; Lainie Kazan; Pat Henry
- Cinematography: Joseph Biroc
- Edited by: Robert Simpson
- Music by: Hugo Montenegro
- Production company: Arcola Pictures
- Distributed by: 20th Century Fox
- Release date: November 20, 1968
- Running time: 94 minutes
- Country: United States
- Language: English
- Budget: $3.6 million

Lady in Cement is a 1968 American neo-noir mystery crime comedy thriller film directed by Gordon Douglas, based on the 1961 novel The Lady in Cement by Marvin H. Albert. The film stars Frank Sinatra, Raquel Welch, Dan Blocker, Richard Conte, Martin Gabel, Lainie Kazan, and Pat Henry.

A sequel to the 1967 film Tony Rome, Lady in Cement was released on November 20, 1968.

== Plot ==
While diving off the Miami coast seeking one of the 11 fabled Spanish galleons sunk in 1591, private investigator Tony Rome discovers a dead woman, her feet encased in cement (concrete), at the bottom of the ocean.

Rome reports this to Lieutenant Dave Santini and thinks nothing more of the incident, until Waldo Gronsky hires him to find a missing woman, Sondra Lomax. Gronsky has little money, so he allows Rome to pawn his watch to retain his services. Eventually, Gronsky admits that he just got out of prison because Sondra Lomax identified him as the perpetrator of a crime, which is why he hired Rome to find her.

After investigating the local hotspots and picking up on a few names, Rome soon comes across Kit Forrest, whose party Sondra Lomax was supposed to have attended. Rome's talking to Forrest raises the ire of racketeer Al Mungar, a supposedly reformed gangster who looks after Kit's interests. Mungar, his son, and some goons warn Rome off the case.

Rome is able to identify Lomax as the lady in cement through an artist who used her as a model. As he gets closer to solving the case, he eventually becomes a suspect and has to evade capture by Lt. Santini. Mungar is revealed to be a figurehead, and his son is the real muscle in the organization. He reveals that he killed Sondra and everyone who got in his way. He is about to kill Kit when Gronsky overpowers him. They call Santini, and the film closes with Kit and Tony together on his boat.

== Cast ==
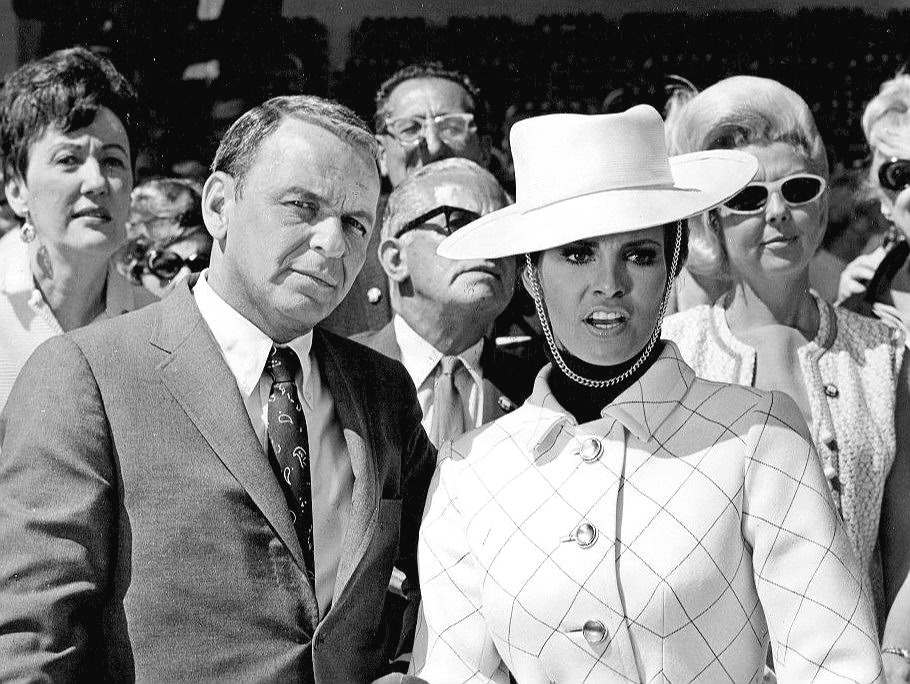
Sinatra and Welch at Gulfstream Park

- Frank Sinatra as Tony Rome
- Raquel Welch as Kit Forrest
- Dan Blocker as Gronsky
- Richard Conte as Lt. Santini
- Martin Gabel as Al Mungar
- Lainie Kazan as Maria Baretto
- Pat Henry as Rubin
- Richard Deacon as Arnie Sherwin
- Alex Stevens as Shev
- Steve Peck as Paul Mungar
- Bunny Yeager as Bunny Fjord - Swedish masseuse

== Production ==
The film was based on a novel published in 1961, which The New York Times called "ingenuous".

Following the success of Tony Rome, Aaron Rosenberg hired Marvin Albert to adapt Cement for Sinatra. The actor made it after The Detective. Raquel Welch's casting was announced in June 1967.

Sammy Davis Jr was to have appeared in the film as the charter-boat captain. Sinatra fell ill, though, and filming was postponed for four weeks. Davis was replaced by Pat Henry in the final film.

Dan Blocker was given time away from Bonanza to play his part. When Rome tracks down Gronski to the seedy massage parlor he owns, Dan Blocker is shown watching a TV which is blaring the Bonanza theme. The movie gave an early role to Lainie Kazan.

Welch later said she did not realize her character was an alcoholic until after filming wrapped. "I'm watching this movie and I'm thinking, 'What the hell has she got on?' At one point, I had this epiphany: 'Oh, she's an alcoholic!' I didn't know that. How could I miss that?... I think I was just so enamored with Frank Sinatra, you know. He's hypnotic."

Filming started in March 1968. Before and during filming, Sinatra was performing at the Fontainebleau in Miami over a six-week period. Welch went to watch him, and found the experience so inspiring, she determined to continue to perform to live audiences in her career.

== Reception ==
=== Box office ===
According to Fox records, the film required $7,150,000 in rentals to break even, and by December 11, 1970, had made $6,825,000, which made a loss for the studio.

=== Critical reception ===
Opening to mixed reviews, Lady in Cement is generally considered to be a middling sequel to Tony Rome. Critic Roger Ebert gave faint praise in a generally scathing review by commenting: "In the movie's few good scenes, Sinatra once again painfully reminds us what a controlled, effective actor he is." Variety described Sinatra's character as being "on the trail of people in whom there couldn't be less interest", Raquel Welch "adds her limited, but beauteous contribution", and Dan Blocker "is excellent as a sympathetic heavy".

== Home media ==
Lady in Cement was released on DVD on May 24, 2005, as part of a boxed set along with Tony Rome and The Detective, both also directed by Douglas. No bonus features were included.

== See also ==
- List of American films of 1968
