= Where Were You When the Lights Went Out? =

1968 film by Hy Averback

- Theatrical poster
- Directed by: Hy Averback
- Screenplay by: Everett Freeman; Karl Tunberg; Original work: Claude Magnier
- Produced by: Everett Freeman; Martin Melcher
- Starring: Doris Day; Patrick O'Neal; Robert Morse; Terry-Thomas; Lola Albright; Jim Backus
- Cinematography: Ellsworth Fredericks
- Edited by: Rita Roland
- Music by: Dave Grusin
- Production company: Metro-Goldwyn-Mayer
- Release date: June 19, 1968
- Running time: 89 minutes
- Country: United States
- Language: English
- Box office: $7,988,000

Where Were You When the Lights Went Out? is a 1968 American comedy film directed by Hy Averback and starring Doris Day, Patrick O'Neal and Robert Morse. Although set in New York City during the infamous Northeast blackout of 1965, the screenplay by Everett Freeman and Karl Tunberg is based on the earlier 1956 French play Monsieur Masure by Claude Magnier.

This was the penultimate film of Doris Day's career, being released two months before her final screen appearance in With Six You Get Eggroll (1968).

== Plot ==
November 9, 1965: Margaret Garrison is a stage actress who has spent her career starring in virginal roles, although she would relish the opportunity to play someone more savory, such as an Italian prostitute, at least once before she retires. When a blackout shutters her current Broadway play for the night, she returns home unexpectedly and discovers her architect husband Peter being overly attentive to attractive reporter Roberta Lane. Infuriated, she heads to the couple's weekend house in Connecticut and takes a concoction to fall asleep.

When corporate embezzler Waldo Zane, fleeing New York with an attache case full of money, develops car trouble near Margaret's weekend house, he lets himself in and unwittingly takes some of the elixir himself, falling into a deep sleep beside her.

Peter shows up, sees the two together, and assumes that his wife has been unfaithful. Despite their claims of innocence and ignorance, Peter believes neither of them and heads back to Manhattan.

Margaret's agent Ladislaus Walichek, anxious because she has announced her plan to retire, keeps her husband's jealousy burning in the hope their marriage will crumble and she will be forced to continue working to support herself.

Margaret and Peter eventually reconcile, but new questions about what really happened when the lights went out arise when she gives birth exactly nine months after that fateful night.

== Cast ==
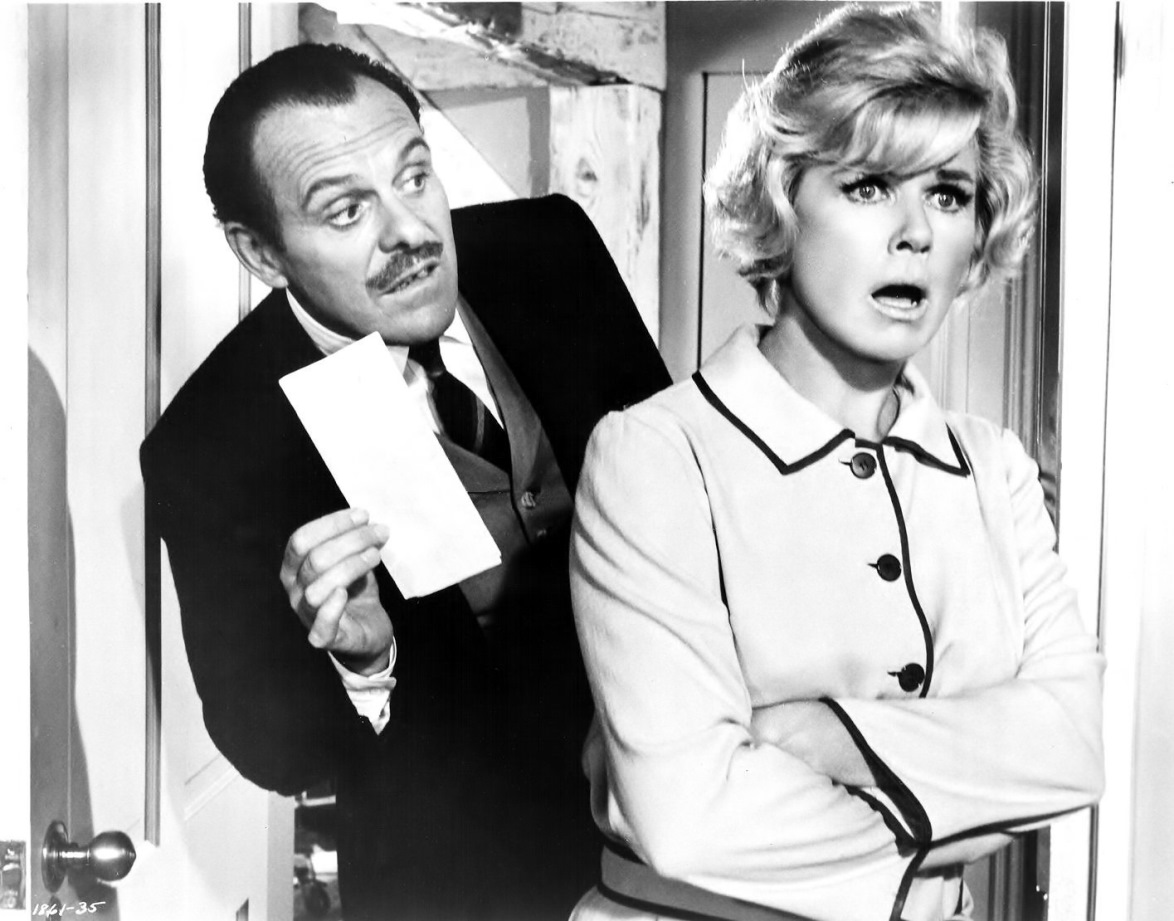
Terry-Thomas and Doris Day

- Doris Day as Margaret Garrison
- Patrick O'Neal as Peter Garrison
- Robert Morse as Waldo Zane
- Terry-Thomas as Ladislaus Walichek
- Lola Albright as Roberta Lane
- Steve Allen as radio announcer
- Jim Backus as Tru-Blue Lou
- Ben Blue as man with a razor
- Pat Paulsen as conductor
- Dale Malone as Otis J. Hendershot, Jr.
- Robert Emhardt as Otis J. Hendershot, Sr.
- Harry Hickox as Detective Captain
- Parley Baer as Dr. Dudley Caldwell
- Randy Whipple as Marvin Reinholtz
- Earl Wilson as himself
- Morgan Freeman as Grand Central commuter (uncredited)

== Production notes ==
The film's title tune was written by Dave Grusin and Kelly Gordon and sung by The Lettermen. George W. Davis and Urie McCleary were the film's art directors, and costumes were designed by Glenn Connelly.

Morgan Freeman is seen briefly as a Grand Central Terminal commuter but does not receive on-screen credit.

The film was the fourteenth film starring Doris Day to premiere at Radio City Music Hall in Manhattan. The MGM release earned $7,988,000 at the box office in the US, making it the 16th highest-grossing film of 1968.

== Critical response ==
In her positive review in The New York Times, Renata Adler wrote, "a good part of the movie permits Miss Day to play an actress something like herself, and this might be fresh and almost poignant."

Time Out New York called it, "a sprightly comedy" and adds, "the performances are superb (Morse, O'Neal and Albright, especially), and Averback's comic timing is spot on."

Variety described the film as "an okay Doris Day comedy, well cast with Robert Morse and Terry-Thomas . . . Averback's comedy direction lifts things a bit out of a well-plowed rut, making for an amusing, while never hilarious, film."

Roger Ebert of the Chicago Sun-Times stated, "Here is another movie about how Doris Day preserves her virtue. Frankly, I have lost interest in Doris Day's virtue. Doris Day without doubt has the most threatened virtue in history. Compared to her, Helen of Troy was a registered nurse. Oh, I'll confess there was once a time when I was concerned. Once there was a time when I was downright worried about Doris Day's virtue. Not long ago, Rock Hudson and Rod Taylor and Richard Harris were all hot on the trail of Doris Day's virtue. But their efforts came to naught, and Doris Day's virtue, as they say, emerged intact. [...] it is supposed to be very funny that Doris Day got into this embarrassing but really innocent situation by accident -- see? I don't find it funny at all. By this time it's taking on the elements of tragedy. If I were Doris Day, and I had accidentally gotten in an embarrassing situation with Rock Hudson and Rod Taylor and Richard Harris and Robert Morse and everyone else in the phone book in 27 straight movies, and my virtue were still intact, frankly I'd start to worry."

TV Guide describes it as "a trifle that starts out funny enough but sinks into predictability, made somewhat better by the adroit acting that triumphs over the lackluster script."

== See also ==
- List of American films of 1968
