= Arthur Tovey =

American film and television actor

- Born: Arthur Roland Tovey; November 14, 1904; Douglas, Arizona, U.S.
- Died: October 20, 2000 (aged 95); Van Nuys, California, U.S.
- Occupations: Film and television actor
- Years active: 1924–2000

Arthur Roland Tovey (November 14, 1904 – October 20, 2000) was an American film and television actor.

== Life and career ==
Tovey was born in Douglas, Arizona. He served in the United States Army during World War II. He began his screen career in 1924 with an uncredited role in the film Yolanda. He then appeared in the films Cimarron, The Mummy and Sunset Murder Case. He was a stand-in for actor Leslie Howard in the 1939 film Gone with the Wind.

Later in his career, Tovey appeared in numerous films such as Miracle on 34th Street (1947), The Walls of Jericho (1948), The Bad and the Beautiful (1952) The Man Who Knew Too Much (1956), The Long, Hot Summer (1958), Days of Wine and Roses (1962), Ride a Northbound Horse (1969), The Good Guys and the Bad Guys (1969) Tora! Tora! Tora! (1970), The Sting (1973) and Back to the Future (1985). He also appeared in numerous television programs including The Twilight Zone, The Man from U.N.C.L.E., Have Gun – Will Travel, Wagon Train, Perry Mason, The Untouchables and My Three Sons.

== Death ==
Tovey died on October 20, 2000, at his home in Van Nuys, California, at the age of 95.
