= Hal Riddle =

American actor (1919–2009)

William Harold Riddle
- Publicity Photo of Hal Riddle
- Born: December 11, 1919; Fulton, Kentucky, US
- Died: June 17, 2009 (aged 89); Woodland Hills, California, US
- Other name: Hal Riddle
- Occupations: Television and movie actor

William Harold "Hal" Riddle (December 11, 1919, Fulton, Kentucky, USA – June 17, 2009, Woodland Hills, California) was a Broadway, movie and television actor. Better known as a character actor than a featured player, Riddle appeared in numerous supporting roles in the 1950s – 1980s.

== Career ==
Riddle's interest in acting started after receiving an autographed picture from actor Billie Dove. Riddle quit a salesman job at National Cash Register Company in New York City in 1946 to join Hayloft Summer Theater in Allentown, Pennsylvania as a secretary. While there he was given small parts and roomed with an unknown Jack Lemmon. After leaving Hayloft Riddle joined Sanford Meisner's Neighborhood Playhouse where he worked with Grace Kelly and Steve McQueen.

Riddle made his Broadway debut in 1950 in Mister Roberts and moved to Hollywood to take a part in 1958 film Onionhead. Riddle retired from acting in 1995.

== Hollywood memorabilia collection ==
Riddle's interest in Hollywood and acting started when, as an 11-year-old, he received an autographed picture from silent film star Billie Dove. Over the next 80 years Riddle added original movie posters, autographed pictures, and letters to the collection. In 2001, Riddle donated his collection of more than 1,700 movie-related items spanning over 70 years to his alma mater, Murray State University in Kentucky.

== Billie Dove friendship ==
In 1995, Riddle retired to the Motion Picture & Television Country House and Hospital. While there, Riddle struck up a friendship with Billie Dove who in 1922 sparked Riddle's interest in acting. In 1998, Riddle delivered fellow actor Billie Dove's eulogy.
