= Shep Houghton =

American actor (1914–2016)

- Publicity Photo of Shep Houghton
- Born: George Shephard Houghton; June 4, 1914; Salt Lake City, Utah, U.S.
- Died: December 15, 2016 (aged 102); Hoodsport, Washington, U.S.
- Occupations: Actor; dancer
- Years active: 1927–1976
- Children: 2

George Shephard Houghton (June 4, 1914 – December 15, 2016) was an American actor and dancer, who appeared mainly in small uncredited roles in films from 1927 until 1976, but also guested on numerous TV series. He had small roles in Gone with the Wind and The Wizard of Oz. At the time of his death in 2016 he was the oldest known surviving cast or crew member from both movies.

== Early life ==
Houghton was born in Salt Lake City, Utah on June 4, 1914.

== Career ==
Houghton was a dancer during his early career and taught actress Greta Garbo how to waltz for a role in Conquest (1937).

In 1939, Houghton appeared in two movie classics, first as Ozmite and a Winkie Guard in the Wizard of Oz and as a Southern dandy in Gone with the Wind. He played many recurring roles, beginning with The Jack Benny Program in 1950. In the early 1950s he worked for television, mostly as a dancer. He worked on the program until 1965. He appeared in Star Trek: The Original Series, in which he appeared in only the first three episodes. In addition to these productions, he worked on the I Love Lucy show from 1951-57. He also appeared on episodes of Wagon Train, Perry Mason, The Lucy-Desi Comedy Hour, Mr. Lucky, The Untouchables, and The Twilight Zone. The 1960s, he appeared in My Three Sons, The Andy Griffith Show, The Dick Van Dyke Show, and The Loretta Young Show. In movies, Houghton appeared as a slave in Spartacus and as a dancer in Hello, Dolly!. In the 1970s, he worked on The Mary Tyler Moore Show. His last role was as a juror in the final episodes of Ellery Queen. He retired from acting later that year.

== Personal life and death ==
In 1935, he married Jane Rosily Kellogg; the couple divorced in 1945. He married actress Geraldine Farnum in 1946; the couple had two children but divorced in 1948. He married Mel Carter in 1975.

Houghton died in Hoodsport, Washington on December 15, 2016, at the age of 102. He outlived all the major Oz cast, the original Tin Man Buddy Ebsen, and all but one of the major Munchkin actors (Jerry Maren was the only adult munchkin who outlived Houghton).

== Selected filmography ==
- Alfred Hitchcock Presents (1960) (Season 6 Episode 2: "The Doubtful Doctor") as Restaurant Patron (uncredited)
