= Joe Ploski =

Polish-born American film and television actor (1904–1993)

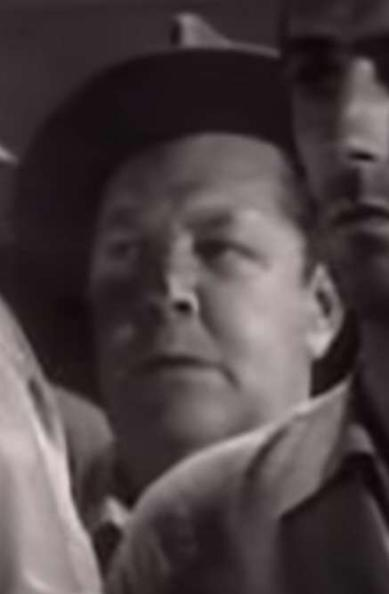
- Ploski in Man with a Camera, 1958
- Born: Joseph Henry Ploski; April 16, 1904; Poland
- Died: May 17, 1993 (aged 89); Los Angeles, California, U.S.
- Occupations: Film and television actor
- Years active: 1932–1970

Joseph Henry Ploski (April 16, 1904 – May 17, 1993) was a Polish-born American film and television actor. He was known for his appearance in the 1953 film Stalag 17, starring William Holden, Don Taylor, and Otto Preminger.

== Life and career ==
Ploski was born in Poland. Initially working as a mess-hall cook in the United States Army during World War II, saving his money to attend at a drama school. He performed in vaudeville in Hollywood, California, and was a straight man for comedian Joe E. Lewis. He made his Broadway debut in 1932, appearing in the Broadway play The Great Magoo, playing Dummy Nolan. He worked in New York with Imogene Coca and Danny Kaye.

Ploski began his screen career in 1936, appearing in the film Lady Be Careful. He then appeared in the films There Goes My Heart and Romance in the Dark. Over the years, he appeared in over 200 films including Dr. Broadway, The Dark Corner, The Reckless Moment, and Experiment Alcatraz, Guys and Dolls, The Court Jester, The Buster Keaton Story, Jailhouse Rock, Never Steal Anything Small, The Rat Race, To Kill a Mockingbird, Seven Days in May and Divorce American Style. He also appeared in numerous television programs including Gunsmoke, Bonanza, Tales of Wells Fargo, Wagon Train, The Fugitive, 77 Sunset Strip, The Twilight Zone, and Perry Mason. His final credit was in the 1970 film Airport.

== Death ==
Ploski died on May 17, 1993, in Los Angeles, California, at the age of 89.

== Selected filmography ==
- Lady Be Careful as Chowoski (uncredited)
- Stalag 17 (1953) as German Guard - Volleyball Player
- Gunsmoke (1956) (Season 1 Episode 31: "How to Die for Nothing") as Townsman (uncredited)
- M Squad (1957) (Season 1 Episode 6: "Street of Fear") as News Vendor
- Wagon Train (1957-1962) (5 episodes)
  - (Season 1 Episode 3: "The John Cameron Story") (1957) as Wagon Train Member (uncredited)
  - (Season 2 Episode 8: "The Millie Davis Story") (1958) as Miner (uncredited)
  - (Season 4 Episode 33: "The Eleanor Culhane Story") (1961) as Townsman (uncredited)
  - (Season 5 Episode 21: "The Daniel Clay Story") (1962) as Wagon Train Member (uncredited)
  - (Season 6 Episode 5: "The John Augustus Story") (1962) as Bartender (uncredited)
- 77 Sunset Strip (1958) (Season 1 Episode 9: "Iron Curtain Caper") as Bartender (uncredited)
- Perry Mason (1958-1965) (5 episodes)
  - (Season 2 Episode 6: "The Case of the Buried Clock") (1958) as Courtroom Spectator (uncredited)
  - (Season 2 Episode 25: "The Case of the Petulant Partner") (1959) as Courtroom Spectator (uncredited)
  - (Season 3 Episode 6: "The Case of Paul Drake's Dilemma") (1959) as Courtroom Spectator (uncredited)
  - (Season 5 Episode 24: "The Case of the Melancholy Marksman") (1962) as Diner Proprietor (uncredited)
  - (Season 9 Episode 2: "The Case of the Fatal Fortune") (1965) as Courtroom Spectator (uncredited)
- Li'l Abner (1959) as Hairless Joe
- The Twilight Zone (1960) (Season 1 Episode 20: "Elegy") as Beauty Contest Guest (uncredited)
- Tales of Wells Fargo (1960) (3 episodes)
  - (Season 4 Episode 31: "Dead Man's Street") as Townsman (uncredited)
  - (Season 4 Episode 32: "Threat of Death") as Townsman (uncredited)
  - (Season 5 Episode 9: "The Killing of Johnny Lash") as Barfly (uncredited)
- Alfred Hitchcock Presents (1962) (2 episodes)
  - (Season 7 Episode 17: "The Faith of Aaron Menefee") as Meeting Guest (uncredited)
  - (Season 7 Episode 39: "The Sorcerer's Apprentice") as Show Spectator (uncredited)
- The Alfred Hitchcock Hour (1964) (Season 2 Episode 17: "The Jar") as Townsman (uncredited)
- The Fugitive (1964) (2 episodes)
  - (Season 1 Episode 24: "Flight from the Final Demon") as Customer in Locker Room (uncredited)
  - (Season 1 Episode 27: "Never Stop Running") as Diner Counterman (uncredited)
- Bonanza (1964-1968) (2 episodes)
  - (Season 6 Episode 11: "A Man to Admire") (1964) as Townsman (uncredited)
  - (Season 9 Episode 30: "The Arrival of Eddie") (1968) as Shopkeeper (uncredited)
- McHale's Navy Joins the Air Force (1965) as Russian Seaman
- Dr. Goldfoot and the Bikini Machine (1965) as Cook
- Airport (1970) as Diner Patron (uncredited)
