= Pat Henry (comedian) =

American comedian

Patrick Henry Scarnato (August 28, 1924 – February 18, 1982), was a Brooklyn-born American comedian who was known for opening for Frank Sinatra for more than two decades. He first appeared with Sinatra in 1958, and appeared with him in the 1968 films The Detective and Lady in Cement.

He also made more than one appearance on such popular television shows as The Tonight Show Starring Johnny Carson, The Dean Martin Show and The Dean Martin Celebrity Roasts, Hollywood Squares, The Ed Sullivan Show, The Merv Griffin Show, The Mike Douglas Show, The David Frost Show, and The Hollywood Palace.

He was found dead in his Caesar's Palace hotel room in Las Vegas, Nevada, on February 18, 1982. His cause of death was a heart attack.

== Filmography ==
Year	Title	Role	Notes
1968	The Detective	Mercidis	
1968	Lady in Cement	Rubin	
1978	Matilda	Hood #4	(final film role)
