= Jackie Joseph =

American actress and writer (b. 1933)

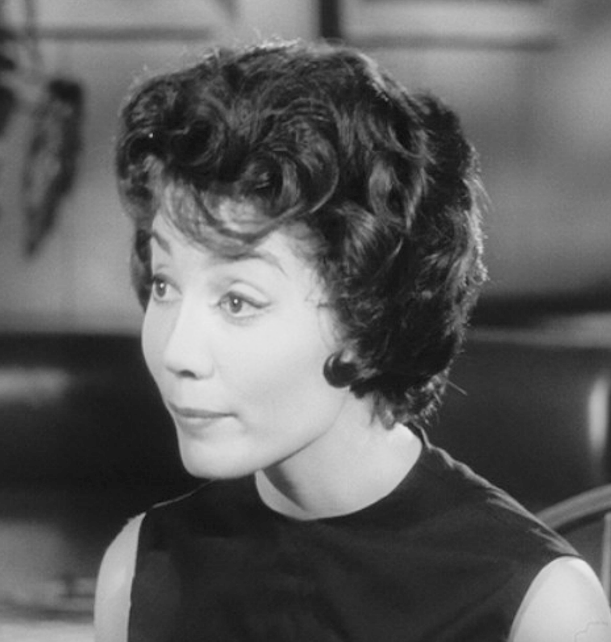
- Joseph in The Little Shop of Horrors (1960)
- Born: November 7, 1933 (age 93); Los Angeles, California, U.S.
- Other name: Jackie Joseph Lawrence
- Education: John Marshall High School
- Alma mater: UCLA
- Occupations: Actress; writer
- Years active: 1958–2019
- Spouses: Ken Berry (m. 1960; div. 1976) David Lawrence (m. 2003)
- Children: 3 (Note: One biological child and two adopted children. All children are deceased.)
- Relatives: Bill Bateman (former-son-in-law)

Jackie Joseph (born November 7, 1933) is a retired American actress and writer. She is best known for her role as Jackie Parker on The Doris Day Show (1971–1973) and Audrey in The Little Shop of Horrors (1960), as well as a supporting role in Gremlins (1984).

== Early life ==
Joseph was born in Los Angeles County, California. Her mother was 19 at the time of Joseph's birth, and her father had died three months earlier. She studied at Los Angeles' John Marshall High School and UCLA.

== Career ==
Joseph began her career as a featured performer and singer in the Billy Barnes Revue of 1958, with future husband and actor Ken Berry.

Joseph's roles on television programs included Melody on Josie and the Pussycats, Miss Oglethorpe on Run, Buddy, Run, Jackie Parker on The Doris Day Show, Sandy on The All New Popeye Hour. She was also a regular on The Bob Newhart Show and The Magic Land of Allakazam.

Joseph is also known for portraying Audrey Fulquard in the original version of The Little Shop of Horrors (1960), as well as Charlene Hensley in Hogan's Heroes (1966), Sheila Futterman in Gremlins (1984) and Gremlins 2: The New Batch (1990), Mrs Kirkland in Police Academy 2: Their First Assignment (1985) and Police Academy 4: Citizens on Patrol (1987), and the voice of Melody in the animated series Josie and the Pussycats and Josie and the Pussycats in Outer Space.

Joseph played the love interest of Willie (played by Bob Denver) in the film Who's Minding the Mint? (1967). Her other film work includes roles in A Guide for the Married Man (1967), With Six You Get Eggroll (1968), The Split (1968), The Good Guys and the Bad Guys (1969), The Cheyenne Social Club (1970), Get Crazy (1983), and Small Soldiers (1998).

Joseph's other television credits include The Andy Griffith Show (Season 4 Episode 17: "My Fair Ernest T. Bass" as Ramona Ankrum), The Dick Van Dyke Show (two appearances), That Girl, F Troop (Season 1 Episode 17: "Our Hero, What's His Name" as Corporal Randolph Agarn's girlfriend Betty Lou MacDonald), Hogan's Heroes (Season 1 Episode 28: "I Look Better in Basic Black" as Charlene Hemsley), McHale's Navy, Gomer Pyle, U.S.M.C. (four appearances), Petticoat Junction (1967 episode: 'A House Divided'), CHiPs (in a two-part episode), Full House and Designing Women (as Mary Jo's mother). She also appeared for a week on the game show Match Game '74. Although she appeared only once on the 1964 sitcom My Living Doll, as one of the few surviving actors to appear on the series she participated in a retrospective featurette included on the 2012 DVD release of the series.

== Other activities ==
In 1977, Joseph became a fashion show producer, staging the Western Children's Brand Wagon show. An audience of 600 watched youngsters model one garment each from 85 companies.

== Personal life ==
Joseph married her first husband, Ken Berry, on May 29, 1960. On November 29, 1962, their son, Joseph Larson Berry, was born but died six days later on December 5, 1962. They then adopted two children, John (1964–2016) and Jennifer (1965–2020). Joseph and Berry divorced in 1977.

She married David Lawrence in 2003. Her son John died of brain cancer in 2016 at the age of 51, and her daughter Jennifer died in 2020 of natural causes at the age of 55.

Joseph protested in a picket line in front of Disney offices with actor Adam Arkin and his wife Michelle during the 2023 SAG-AFTRA strike.

== Filmography ==
Year	Title	Role	Notes
1958	Suicide Battalion	Cho-Cho	Uncredited
1958	King Creole	Salesgirl	Uncredited
1959	You Bet Your Life	Herself	Episode #59-02 (Oct. 1, 1959)
1959	Speed Crazy	Laura	
1960	Why Must I Die?	Marge Brennan – Cigarette Girl	Uncredited
1960	The Little Shop of Horrors	Audrey Fulquard	
1960	Saiyûki		Voice
1964	The Andy Griffith Show	Ramona Ankrum	Episode: "My Fair Ernest T. Bass"
1964	The Dick Van Dyke Show	Alberta Schweitzer	Episode: "Dear Mrs Petrie, Your Husband Is in Jail"
1965	Gomer Pyle, U.S.M.C.	Marilyn	Season 1 Episode 19: "Love Letters to the Sarge"
1966	Hogan's Heroes	Charlene Hensley	Episode: "I Look Better in Basic Black"
1967	A Guide for the Married Man	Janet Brophy	
1967	Who's Minding the Mint?	Imogene Harris	
1968	With Six You Get Eggroll	Georgia Watson	
1968	The Split	Jackie	
1969	The Good Guys and the Bad Guys	Doris	
1970	The Cheyenne Social Club	Annie Jo	
1971	The Carol Burnett Show	Eloise	Season 5 Episode 13 (Dec. 15, 1971)
1983	Get Crazy	Susie's Mom	
1984	Gremlins	Sheila Futterman	
1985	Police Academy 2: Their First Assignment	Mrs. Kirkland	
1987	Police Academy 4: Citizens on Patrol	Mrs. Kirkland	
1990	Gremlins 2: The New Batch	Sheila Futterman	
1998	Small Soldiers	Wife	
