= Alex Stevens =

American actor and stunt performer

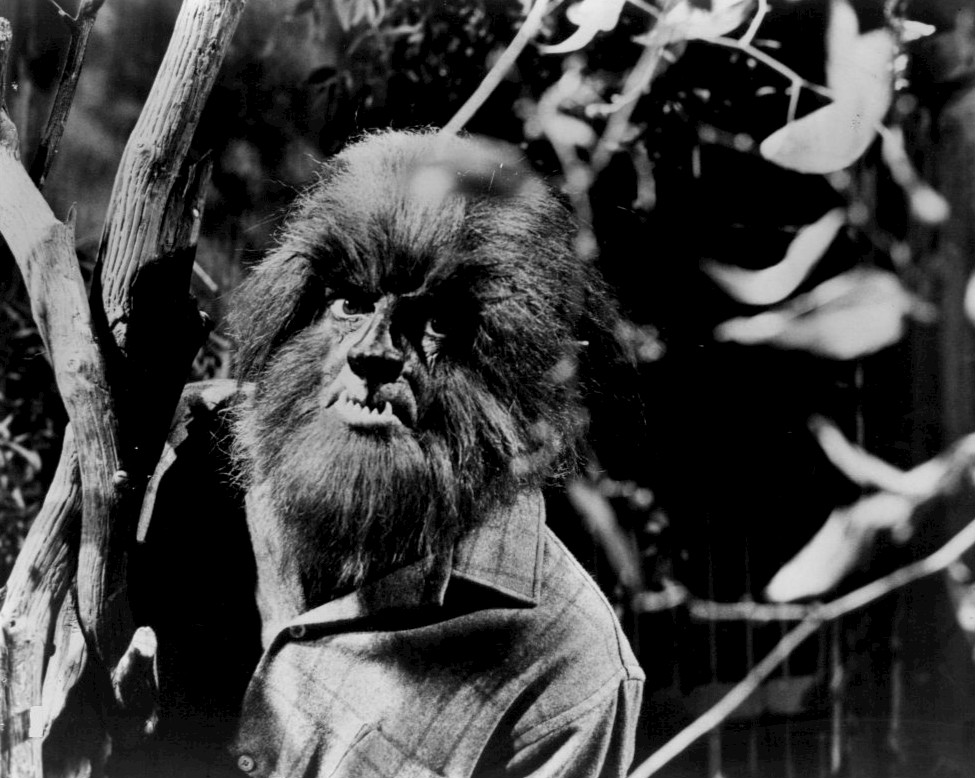
Alex Stevens as the Werewolf on Dark Shadows (1969)

Alex Poulos (January 6, 1936 – April 14, 2015) was an American actor and stunt performer, best known for his roles as the Werewolf on Dark Shadows and the Baker from Sesame Street.

Born in Hartford, Connecticut, Stevens first acted in a western theme park in New Jersey, as well as making appearances in Off-Broadway plays before making his first appearance in Dark Shadows. He then appeared for the first time on Sesame Street, where he appeared in "The Number Song" segments as the baker who fell down the stairs while carrying a certain number of pies, cakes or other desserts. Stevens had bit parts in films such as A Lovely Way to Die, Lady in Cement, Hercules in New York, The Groove Tube, and David Cronenberg's Scanners.

As a stunt performer, Stevens worked on projects such as The Gumball Rally, Superman, Three Men and a Baby and Goodfellas before ending his career in 1997, with a stunt job in an episode of Oz.

Stevens died on April 14, 2015, in New York City. He was 79 years old.
