= Garrett Lewis =

American set decorator

- Born: April 2, 1935; St. Louis, Missouri
- Died: January 29, 2013 (aged 77); Woodland Hills, California
- Occupation: Set Decorator
- Years active: 1978 – 2007

Garrett Lewis (April 2, 1935 – January 29, 2013) was an American actor, dancer, and set decorator. He was nominated for four Academy Awards in the category Best Art Direction.

== Selected filmography ==
Lewis has been nominated for four Academy Awards for Best Art Direction:

- Beaches (1988)
- Glory (1989)
- Hook (1991)
- Bram Stoker's Dracula (1992)

=== Actor ===
- Star! (1968) - Jack Buchanan
- The Good Guys and the Bad Guys (1969) - Hawkins
- Funny Lady (1975) - Production Singer
- Oh! Heavenly Dog (1980) - Pamela Natwick Man No. 1
