= Lee Kolima =

American actor

- Born: Charles Howard Zalopany; February 20, 1920
- Died: November 23, 1995 (aged 75)

Lee Kolima (born Charles Howard Zalopany, February 20, 1920 – November 23, 1995), was a professional wrestler and a film actor.

== Biography ==
Born to George Zalopany and Anna Silva, Charles married Cleo Zalopany on January 24, 1948, in Los Angeles, California.

He wrestled in the 1950s under the names Kubla Khan, Lee Kolima and Hilo Lee Kolima.

Kolima began his film and television career in 1965 with a role in Voyage to the Bottom of the Sea and made his film debut the following year in an uncredited role in John Ford's 7 Women (1966).

With the popularity of Oddjob in the spy genre of the mid-1960s, Kolima played an intimidating enemy secret agent in such television shows as I Spy, Get Smart, The Girl from U.N.C.L.E., The Wild Wild West and The Spy Who Came in from the Cool episode of The Monkees. He appeared alongside Harold Sakata himself in Dimension 5 (1966).

He appeared on the cover of Tom Waits's Swordfishtrombones alongside Angelo Rossitto.

His final film appearance was in Cannonball Run II (1984).
