= Duke Fishman =

Filipino-American commercial, film and television actor

- Born: July 15, 1906; Philippines
- Died: December 22, 1977 (aged 71); Palm Springs, California, U.S.
- Occupations: Commercial, film and television actor

Duke Fishman (July 15, 1906 – December 22, 1977), also known as The Duke of Catalina, was a Filipino-American commercial, film and television actor.

Fishman appeared in numerous television programs including Gunsmoke, Bonanza, The Big Valley, Tales of Wells Fargo, The Wild Wild West, Get Smart, Bat Masterson and Rawhide. He also appeared in numerous films including The Seven Year Itch, Decision at Sundown, The Tin Star, Support Your Local Sheriff!, The Oscar, The Manchurian Candidate, One-Eyed Jacks, The Gunfight at Dodge City and Ada.

Fishman died on December 22, 1977, in Palm Springs, California, at the age of 71.
