= Luciano Foti =

Italian painter

Luciano Foti (1694–1779) was an Italian painter of the Baroque era.

== Biography ==
He was born in Messina. He was known as an excellent restorer, a skill much in demand in the earthquake prone Sicilian city. He also survived the onslaught of the plague in Messina in 1743, which decimated the artist community. He made many Renaissance-style paintings based on designs of Polidoro da Caravaggio.
