= Stacy King =

American actress

Stacy King is an American character actress of the 1960s. Red-haired and tall, King had guest-starring roles in Alfred Hitchcock Presents, Gomer Pyle, U.S.M.C. and The Beverly Hillbillies on television, and featured roles in movies The Sweet Ride and Skidoo. She was born and raised in Memphis, Tennessee.

King raised white German shepherd dogs, at one point she was the vice-president of her local branch of the White German Shepherd Club of America.

== Selected filmography ==
- Laramie (1962) (Season 3 Episode 20: "A Grave for Cully Brown") as Sally
- The Alfred Hitchcock Hour (1964) (Season 3 Episode 11: "Consider Her Ways") as Female Worker
- Gomer Pyle, U.S.M.C. (1968) (Season 4 Episode 23: "Sergeant Iago") as Hilda
- The Beverly Hillbillies (1969) (Season 7 Episode 15: "Drysdale and Friend") as Kathy King
