= Harry Hickox =

American character actor (1910–1994)

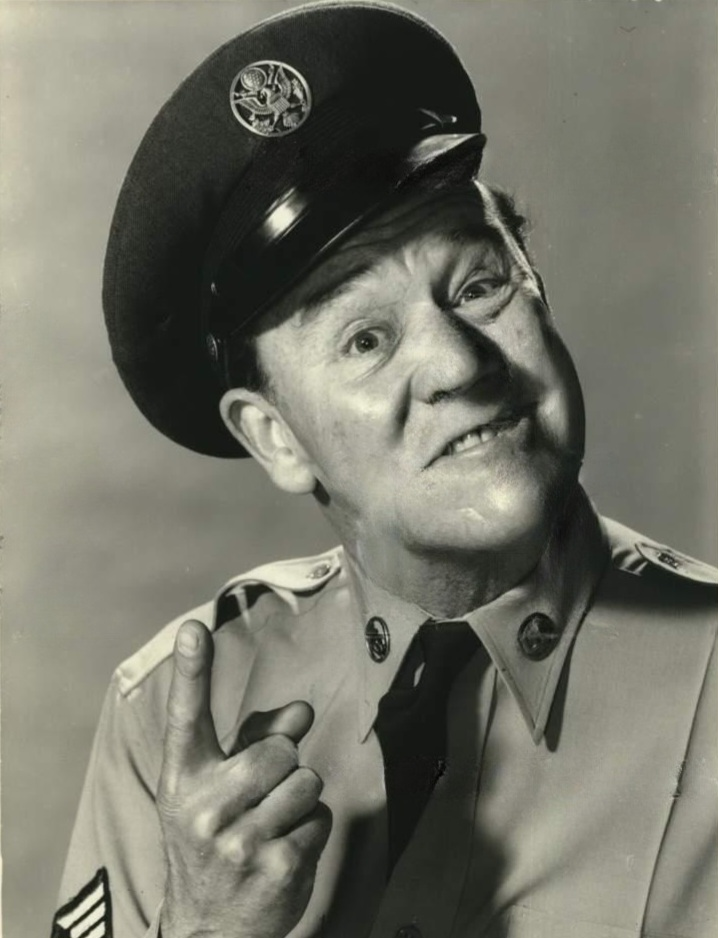
- Hickox in No Time for Sergeants (1964)
- Born: October 22, 1910; Big Spring, Texas, U.S.
- Died: June 3, 1994 (aged 83); Los Angeles, California, U.S.
- Occupation: Actor
- Years active: 1936–1976

Harry Hickox (October 22, 1910 – June 3, 1994) was an American character actor.

== Career ==
Hickox was born in Big Spring, Texas. He began his career as a musician, playing guitar with jazz bands, including that of Jack Teagarden. One of his early theatrical ventures was acting in Idiot's Delight in a little theater in Albuquerque, New Mexico. He married a member of that cast. The couple created Jump Jump of Holiday House, a children's program on radio and television that won awards for excellence. He also produced a TV show about jazz.

In the early 1960s, Hickox portrayed Harold Hill in a touring company of The Music Man. He also played Charlie Cowell in the 1962 film adaptation.

== Death ==
He died on June 3, 1994, in Los Angeles, California at age 83.

== Filmography ==
Year	Title	Role	Notes
1956	The Scarlet Hour	Uniformed Policeman	Uncredited
1958	Return to Warbow	Jim	Uncredited
1962	The Music Man	Charlie Cowell	
1964	Cheyenne Autumn	Bartender	Uncredited
1966	The Ghost and Mr. Chicken	Police Chief Art Fuller	
1966	Hold On!	Grant	
1967	Hotel	Sam	
1967	Hot Rods to Hell	Bill Phillips	
1967	Rosie!	Detective	
1968	Speedway	The Cook	
1968	Where Were You When the Lights Went Out?	Detective Captain Percy Watson	
1968	The Virginian saison 6 épisode 06 (The masquerade)	Bill Manders	
1971	Adam-12	James Crawford	
1968	The Split	Detective	
1971	The Virginian (TV series)	Mr.Bristol	saison 9 episode 14 (Nan Allen)
1973	Emperor of the North Pole	Elder	Uncredited
1974	The Towering Inferno	Prospective Tenant	Uncredited
