= Kid Chissell =

American boxer (1905–1987)

Noble "Kid" Chissell (February 16, 1905 – November 8, 1987) was an American boxing champion, actor, and dance marathon champion.

Chissell, former U.S. Navy Middleweight Boxing Champ (1932), received an award in 1982 for having over 1,000 screen credits. As a prizefighter, he once fought "Packy East", later known as Bob Hope. Even earlier he won the 1928 World Marathon Dance Champion contest. He first gained international prominence as the villainous sulky driver, "Flea-Flit Dryer", in the film Home in Indiana, opposite Walter Brennan, Ward Bond, Lon McAllister, June Haver, and Jeanne Crain. Numerous other motion pictures include his portrayal of a middle-weight champ in Ex-Champ, prison guard with Susan Hayward in I Want to Live!, a gambler in Guys and Dolls, police officer Noble in The Big Chase, and deputy sheriff with Jane Fonda in Cat Ballou. In the first and sixth episodes of Disney's World of Color series, Gallegher, Chissell played the Irish fight referee and jailer opposite Edmond O'Brien. He was croupier at the roulette game in "Tiger by the Tail", one of the Gunsmoke episodes. Life of Riley, Dragnet, and Playhouse 90 and People's Court were other series Chissell worked in.

Good friends with Hal Raynor and Joe Penner, Chissell did some radio comedy bits during the 1930s.

He also was politically active and ran for mayor of Los Angeles in 1953 and for the 40th State Assembly District in 1962.

In 1966, in an uncredited role, he appeared in James Arness's TV Western series Gunsmoke, playing a clan's Buffalo Hunter in S11E26's “”Which Doctor?”.

Other credits include They Shoot Horses, Don't They?, The Quiet Man, Road to Rio and other Bob Hope movies and 20 of Hope's TV specials.

He was a member of the Hollywood Comedy Club, an organization of motion picture and theatrical folk, and the International Footprint Association, an organization of peace officers and reputable citizens.

Kid Chissell was born Noble Chisman, son of Thomas Farbri Chisman (1880–1958) and Cora Esther Laporte (1884–1962), in Indianapolis in 1905. Noble was the first cousin twice removed on his mother's side of the noted Irish poet/balladeer, Johnny Tom Gleeson.

== Selected filmography ==
- Knockout (1941)
- Home in Indiana (1944)
- My Buddy (1944)
- Jealousy (1945)
- Suspense (1946)
- A Likely Story (1947)
- Sorrowful Jones (1949)
- The Hellcats (1967)
- They Shoot Horses, Don't They? (1969)
- The West Is Still Wild (1977)
