= Thordis Brandt =

German-American actress (1940–2015)

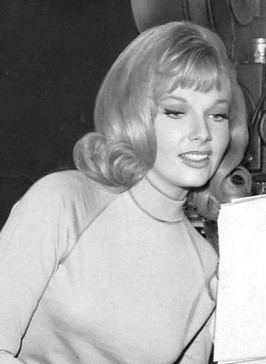
- Brandt in the set of Dragnet (1969)
- Born: September 7, 1940; Germany
- Died: July 27, 2015 (aged 74); Los Angeles, California, U.S.
- Occupation: Actress
- Years active: 1965–1970
- Partner: James Arness (1965–1972)
- Children: 1 (deceased)

Thordis Brandt (September 7, 1940 – July 27, 2015) was a German-American actress who appeared in various classic films and television shows.

== Background ==
Thordis Brandt was born in Germany on September 7, 1940, to Norwegian and German parents. She moved to Canada as a young girl and was raised initially at a farm in St. Norbert, Manitoba, then moved to a mink ranch in Bella Coola, British Columbia, then to Vancouver in 1958. In 1963, Thordis graduated as a registered nurse from St. Paul's Hospital School of Nursing.

She moved to Santa Monica, California, where she continued to practice her nursing in private duty. One of her jobs in private duty was serving actress Patricia Neal. Neal recommended Thordis to other actors and actresses and Thordis became known as the "actor's nurse". Thordis began her career as a nurse advisor in Ben Casey where she made appearances on the show.

Around 1967, Brandt met Gunsmoke's leading actor James Arness, who was her boyfriend for six years before they ended their relationship.

After retiring from acting, she continued nursing in Beverly Hills. Brandt died in Los Angeles on July 27, 2015, at the age of 74. Her son, Christopher, died in 2023.

== Career ==
A bit player for most of her career, she appeared in such TV shows as Burke's Law, The Girl from UNCLE, The Man from UNCLE, The Green Hornet, Mannix, and Hogan's Heroes, as well as the 1967 episode of The Fugitive "The One That Got Away". Although she had some speaking parts, Thordis' appearances rarely required her to speak.

She also appeared in films beginning with The Last of the Secret Agents? and Nevada Smith (both 1966), then In Like Flint (1967) and Funny Girl (1968). She appeared in two Elvis Presley films Spinout (1966) and Live a Little, Love a Little (1968). She has gained minor cult status as the victim of a serial killer in the made-for-TV movie Dragnet 1966, and her appearances in the films The Witchmaker (1969) and Up Your Teddy Bear (1970).
