= Gunrunner (disambiguation) =

A gunrunner is someone who deals in arms trafficking.

Gunrunner or Gun Runner may also refer to:

== Film ==
- The Gun Runner (1928 film), an American silent film directed by Edgar Lewis
- Gun Runner (film), a 1949 film
- The Gun Runner (1956 film) or Santiago, a film starring Alan Ladd
- The Gun Runners, a 1958 film noir crime film by Don Siegel
- The Gun Runner, a 1969 action film
- The Gunrunner (film), a 1983 film starring Kevin Costner
- Gun Runners, a 2016 documentary film by Anjali Nayar

== Other uses ==
- Gun Runner (horse), a Thoroughbred racehorse
- Gunrunner (comics), a character in Tintin comics
- Terry and the Gunrunners, New Zealand comic book
- MQR-16 Gunrunner, a U.S. military rocket
- Project Gunrunner, a U.S. project to prevent weapons reaching Mexican cartels
