= Woolner =

Woolner may refer to:

- Woolner (surname) (which includes a list of persons with the surname)
- Woolner, Northern Territory, a suburb of Darwin, Australia
- Woolna First Nations people of the Northern Territory of Australia
- Wulna language, an Australian language of the Darwin region

== See also ==
- Woolner Brothers, an American film company
