= Beach Dickerson =

American actor (1924–2005)

- Beach Dickerson
- Born: Charles Beach Dickerson; February 3, 1924; Glennville, Georgia, U.S.
- Died: December 7, 2005 (aged 81); Los Angeles, California, U.S.
- Occupation: Actor

Charles Beach Dickerson (February 3, 1924 – December 7, 2005) was an American actor known for such films as The Trip and Crazy Mama.

== Career ==
Dickerson worked frequently with director Roger Corman. His first appearance was in Attack of the Crab Monsters.

He also appeared in the films Sorority Girl, Rock All Night, Cocaine and Blue Eyes, Teenage Caveman and the 1991 film Future Kick.

== Death ==
Dickerson died in Los Angeles, California on December 7, 2005, at the age of 81.

He willed three houses to his friend, author Scotty Bowers. The spreading of Dickerson's ashes by Bowers was shown in the 2017 documentary film Scotty and the Secret History of Hollywood.

== Partial filmography ==
- 1956 Hollywood or Bust as Bellboy (uncredited)
- 1957 Attack of the Crab Monsters as Seaman Ron Fellows
- 1957 Rock All Night as The Kid
- 1957 Loving You as Glenn (uncredited)
- 1957 Sorority Girl as Terry's Boyfriend
- 1958 War of the Satellites as Crewman With Gun
- 1958 Teenage Caveman as Fair-Haired Boy / Man from Burning Plains / Tom-Tom Player / Bear
- 1959 T-Bird Gang as Barney Adams
- 1960 Visit to a Small Planet as Beatnik (uncredited)
- 1960 G.I. Blues as Warren
- 1961 Creature from the Haunted Sea as Pete Peterson Jr.
- 1964 Shell Shock as Rance
- 1967 The Trip
- 1968 The Savage Seven as Bruno
- 1968 Killers Three as Scotty
- 1969 Like Mother Like Daughter as Joe "Jo-Jo"
- 1969 The Gun Runner as Max Keeler
- 1970 The Dunwich Horror as Mr. Cole
- 1970 Angels Die Hard as "Shank"
- 1971 Bury Me an Angel as Harry
- 1971 Welcome Home, Soldier Boys as Used Car Salesman
- 1972 Runaway, Runaway as Bruce, Lorri's Customer
- 1973 Cleopatra Jones as Homosexual (uncredited)
- 1974 Summer School Teachers as Apartment Manager
- 1975 Capone as Joe Kepka
- 1975 Crazy Mama as Desk Clerk
- 1976 Eat My Dust as G.I. Jackson
- 1981 Smokey Bites the Dust as Band Director
- 1985 School Spirit as Second Doctor
- 1988 Deadly Dreams as Sportsman #2
- 1991 Future Kick as Hotel Clerk
