= Dixie Peabody =

American actress

- Born: Diane Potter; December 11, 1947
- Died: February 28, 2005 (aged 57)
- Occupation: Actress

Dixie Peabody (December 11, 1947 – February 28, 2005) was an American actress who appeared in exploitation films of the early 1970s produced by Roger Corman’s New World Pictures. Before beginning her acting career, she worked as a model under the name Diane Potter.

Peabody starred in the Barbara Peeters–directed low-budget drive-in film Bury Me an Angel, her first major role after an uncredited appearance as a biker in Angels Die Hard. She also appeared in Night Call Nurses and later worked as a production assistant on Peeters’ Summer School Teachers, which is her last known film credit.

Her brother was later murdered.

== Filmography ==
- Angels Die Hard (1970) – uncredited
- Bury Me an Angel (1971)
- Night Call Nurses (1972)
- Summer School Teachers (1973) – production assistant
