= Mutiny in Outer Space =

1965 film by Hugo Grimaldi and Arthur C. Pierce

- Theatrical release poster
- Directed by: Hugo Grimaldi; Arthur C. Pierce (uncredited)
- Written by: Hugo Grimaldi; Arthur C. Pierce
- Produced by: Hugo Grimaldi; Arthur C. Pierce; Bernard Woolner; David Woolner; Lawrence Woolner
- Starring: William Leslie; Dolores Faith; Pamela Curran; Richard Garland
- Cinematography: Archie R. Dalzell (as Archie Dalzell)
- Edited by: George White
- Music by: Harry Eisen (Stock music editor)
- Production company: Hugo Grimaldi Productions
- Distributed by: Woolner Brothers Pictures
- Release date: March 3, 1965
- Running time: 82 minutes
- Country: United States
- Language: English
- Budget: $90,000 (estimate)

Mutiny in Outer Space is a 1965 black-and-white independent American science fiction action film, written, produced, and directed by Hugo Grimaldi and Arthur C. Pierce, although Pierce was not credited as directing. It stars William Leslie, Dolores Faith, Pamela Curran, and Richard Garland.

Space Station X-7 is overrun by a previously unknown but deadly alien fungus that originated in ice caves on the Moon and was inadvertently brought back by astronauts returning with lunar samples. In order to save the space station from destruction, members of the crew are forced to mutiny against X-7's commander, who is not in his right mind because of "space raptures".

In the US, Mutiny in Outer Space was theatrically released as the second film of a double feature with The Human Duplicators.

== Plot ==
Maj. Gordon Towers and Capt. Dan Webber are returning to Space Station X-7 after collecting geological samples and ice from newly-discovered ice caves on the Moon. Upon arrival, Dan collapses and is taken to the infirmary by Dr. Hoffman and Gordon is reunited with his girlfriend, Dr. Faith Montaine, a civilian biochemist.

Hoffman has difficulty diagnosing Dan, ruling out "space raptures" because they cause hallucinations and not the high fever that Dan is running. Faith notices that a small welt on Dan's leg is growing rapidly into a large fungus. She says that the spores causing the fungus must have come from the Moon's ice caves. They put Dan into isolation.

Meanwhile, the commander of X-7, Col. Frank Cromwell, is behaving oddly. As a swarm of meteors approaches the space station, Cromwell is unable to give the order to take evasive action until prodded to do so by X-7's communications officer, Lt. Connie Engstrom.

Dan dies, his body horribly disfigured by the fungus. But when Cromwell looks at the body in the isolation chamber, he calmly says, "There's nothing unusual in there" and refuses to report to Gen. Knowland at Earth Control Center that the fungus has killed Dan. He insists that Dan's demise was caused by "pressure shock" and warns Gordon, Faith, and Hoffman to say nothing about the fungus because it might panic X-7's crew. Hoffman says that Cromwell is "on the verge of space raptures" and very sick.

Gordon decides that the situation is serious enough to remove Cromwell from command. But Gordon fails in his attempt, which Cromwell says is "mutiny". Cromwell orders Connie to send a message to Knowland about the mutiny and to say in it that Gordon held the crew at gunpoint until he was overpowered. Connie seemingly agrees, but Cromwell does not know that she has surreptitiously recorded the order. She transmits it to Knowland, who is immediately aware that something is amiss because weapons were outlawed in space in 1970, more than 20 years earlier. Connie also reports that the entire space station is being overrun by the fungus. Knowland tries to reply to X-7 but gets no response. He says that X-7 may have to be destroyed to prevent the fungus from reaching Earth.

Hoffman contracts the fungal infection and is very ill. However, he is able to tell Faith and Gordon that the fungus can be killed by cold. Knowing this, Gordon and the others make a second attempt to take control of X-7. Besides the danger from the fungus, Cromwell, now fully in the grips of space raptures, is trying to destroy X-7. They confine Cromwell to his quarters, but he escapes and sabotages the communications system, cutting off all contact between X-7 and the Earth. He is then recaptured.

Gordon knows that the only hope of saving X-7 is to lower its interior temperature to below zero degrees. The fungus inside X-7 dies, but it is now growing on the outside of the space station. No one can understand why the fungus is spreading on X-7's exterior until one of Knowland's staff officers says that it must be due to the "high temperatures generated by the unshielded blazing sun" beating down on X-7. This gives Knowland the idea of launching a rocket that will explode and form a huge cloud of ice crystals for X-7 to pass through.

Knowland's idea works and the fungus on the exterior of X-7 is killed. Gordon uses the repaired communications system to request a relief ship. Knowland tells him that it will arrive at X-7 in three hours and concludes his message by saying, "Don't lose your faith". Faith and Gordon look at each other and smile now that the crisis is over.

== Cast ==
- William Leslie as Maj. Gordon Towers
- Dolores Faith as Dr. Faith Montaine
- Pamela Curran as Lt. Connie Engstrom
- Richard Garland as Col. Frank Cromwell
- Harold Lloyd Jr. as Sgt. Andrews
- James Dobson as Dr. Hoffman
- Ron Stokes as Sgt. Sloan
- Boyd Holister as Maj. Olsen (in credits as Robert Palmer)
- Gabriel Curtiz as Dr. Stoddard
- Glenn Langan as Gen. Knowland (in credits as Glen Langan)
- H. Kay Stevens as Sgt. Engstrom
- Francine York as Capt. Stevens
- Joel Smith (unnamed character)
- Carl Crow as Capt. Dan Webber
- Robert Nash (unnamed character)

== Production ==
Mutiny in Outer Space was filmed in six days at Producers Studio in Hollywood, beginning on March 18, 1964. The film's budget was approximately $90,000. The production companies were Hugo Grimaldi Film Productions and Woolner Brothers Pictures. Space Station X and Invasion from the Moon were the film's working titles.

Although it was filmed in the US, British film critic Phil Hardy lists it in The Overlook Film Encyclopedia: Science Fiction as an Italian-American co-production. Mutiny in Outer Space is "one of a pair" of such co-productions "directed in 1965 by Grimaldi (the other being The Human Duplicators)."

== Release ==
Mutiny in Outer Space was theatrically released in the US as the bottom half of a double feature with The Human Duplicators. It was released on March 3, 1965 and premiered in Los Angeles on May 12, 1965 and opened in the UK and Mexico at unspecified dates that year, in West Germany on November 11, 1966, and at an unspecified date in Italy. The film was titled Motin en la Nave Espacial in Mexico; SS-X-7 Panik im All in West Germany; and Ammutinamento nello spazio (also known as Gli Ammutinati dello spazio) in Italy.

In the US, the film was distributed by Woolner Brothers Pictures and in the UK by Regal Films International, both during 1965. In 1966, Allied Artists took over US theatrical distribution, the same year that Goldeck-Filmverleih distributed it to theaters in West Germany.

== Home media ==
VZ-Handelsgeschellschaft released the film on DVD in Germany in 2013. International Film Distributors in Canada hold the all-media distribution rights.

Mutiny in Outer Space is also included in Shiver & Shudder Show, a 2002 video released in the US by Something Weird Video. It features segments from 47 science fiction and horror films from the 1950s, 1960s, and 1970s.

== Reception ==
Writing on May 12, 1965, "Whit," a reviewer for Variety, said that Mutiny in Outer Space "stacks up as a suitable minor entry". But he went on to praise "Grimaldi's direction of the Arthur C. Pierce script" and said that the film was "deftly lensed" by cinematographer Archie R. Dalzell and that "George White's editing is a plus".

Modern American film scholar Gary Westfahl praises the film for making "important points about the dangerous effects of prolonged life in space". However, he writes, it better "recalls more fanciful films", such as The Green Slime, than it does the more documentary-like 1950s films Project Moon Base and Conquest of Space. He says that Mutiny in Outer Space is reminiscent of "Specimen: Unknown," a February 1964 episode of the TV series The Outer Limits, which he also placed in his "fanciful" category.

Like Westphal, Bryan Senn, an American film critic, sees both good and bad in Mutiny in Outer Space. He writes that "Richard Garland gives a good performance as the stressed-out space skipper" and refers kindly to the rest of the cast as "overworked [and] presumably underpaid". On the other hand, Senn calls the film a "mishmash" that suffers from "shoddy black-and-white production values and substandard special effects" and says that "scenes aboard the X-7 are shot in gloomy darkness, adding to the film's unmistakable look of cheapness".

An anonymous reviewer in TV Guide sees the film as more-or-less of a historical failure, writing that "By the time of the film's release, space travel was less mysterious than it had been in the genre's heyday 10 years before. Thus this routine fare, with standard production values and acting, was simply too late to stir up much interest".

However, more recently, Mutiny in Outer Space was revived specifically for Women's History Month. The film was chosen for its unusually high number of women cast as astronauts aboard X-7 and as military personnel on Earth. It was shown on March 17, 2017 as part of a 16 mm film series at The Newman Center in Plattsburgh, NY.

== See also ==
- List of films featuring space stations
