= Woolner (surname) =

Notable persons with the surname Woolner include:

- Alfred Cooper Woolner, (1878–1936), Sanskrit scholar
- Bernard Woolner (1910–1977), co-founder of the Woolner Brothers film company
- Christopher Woolner (1893–1984), British Army officer
- Keith Woolner (born c. 1968), American baseball analyst
- Lawrence Woolner (1912–1985), American film producer
- Thomas Woolner (1825–1892), English sculptor and poet
