= Chris Finch (disambiguation) =

Chris Finch or Christopher Finch may refer to:

- Chris Finch (basketball) (born 1969), American basketball player and coach
- Christopher Finch (born 1975), former cricketer from New Zealand
- Chris Finch, a character played by Ralph Ineson on The Office (British TV series)
