= The Boneyard =

1991 comedy horror film by James Cummins

- Directed by: James Cummins
- Written by: James Cummins
- Produced by: Richard F. Brophy
- Starring: Ed Nelson; Deborah Rose; Norman Fell; James Eustermann; Phyllis Diller
- Cinematography: Irl Dixon
- Music by: Katherine Anne Porter; John Lee Whitener
- Distributed by: Zia Film Distribution
- Release date: June 12, 1991
- Running time: 93 minutes
- Country: United States
- Language: English
- Budget: <$5 million

The Boneyard is a 1991 American direct-to-video horror film directed by James Cummins and starring Ed Nelson, Deborah Rose, Norman Fell, James Eustermann, and Phyllis Diller.

== Plot ==
The film plunges into the nightmarish experiences of a depressed psychic named Alley Oates (Deborah Rose), whose involvement in a grisly child-murder case leads her and her detective partner, Jersey Callum (Ed Nelson), to an imposing, fortress-like mortuary. Chen (Robert Yun Ju Ahn), the owner of the funeral home and prime suspect in the case, claims the three mummified corpses in question are not children but ancient demons known as jiangshi. It seems the little monsters have been around for centuries as a result of an age-old curse and can only be placated with offerings of human flesh — with which the mortician has been supplying them his entire life. When Chen is jailed on murder charges, the under-fed ghouls awaken in search of dinner, trapping the staff inside the mortuary walls and devouring them. The survivors, including Oates and Callum, use every means at their disposal to combat the demons, which have possessed the bodies of morgue attendant Mrs. Poopinplatz (Phyllis Diller) and her poodle, mutating them into hideous monsters.

== Cast ==
- Ed Nelson as Jersey Callum
- Deborah Rose as Alley Oates
- Norman Fell as Shepard
- James Eustermann as Gordon Mullin
- Denise Young as Dana
- Willie Stratford as Marty(as Willie Stratford Jr.)
- Phyllis Diller as Miss Poopinplatz
- Robert Yun Ju Ahn as Chen
- Richard F. Brophy as Mac(as Rick Brophy)
- Sallie Middleton Kaltreider as Little Ghoul
- Janice Dever as Medium Ghoul
- Cindy Dollar-Smith as Big Ghoul
- Michael Haun as Floofsoms and Poopinplatz Ghouls
- Brian Ahn as Dead Child #2
- Jessica Lasher as Dead Child #3
- Bo Sook Ahn as Oriental Mother(as Boo Sook Ahn)
- Edward Mau-Tung Sun as Oriental Father
- Christopher Finch as Sorcerer

== Production ==
The Boneyard marked the directorial debut of James Cummins who had previously worked under the likes of Chris Walas and Stan Winston When Phyllis Diller was trying out different looks for the character of Miss Poopinplatz, Diller's wig fell off by accident and with Cummins encouragement Diller did the role without a wig and later incorporated the lack of a wig into her stand-up. Shooting took place in Statesville, North Carolina, in 1989 over the course of five weeks. In December 1989, a botched special effect caused a fire. The film also marked the first work of makeup artist Bill Corso.

== Reception ==
Patrick Naugle of DVD Verdict called it "good, goofy fun." Steve Simels of Entertainment Weekly rated the film B− and described it as a film destined to be a cult classic. In a negative review, Lawrence Cohn of Variety stated that, instead of being funny, the film "comes off as merely silly". Adam Tyner of DVD Talk rated it 2.5/5 stars and said that the film wastes too much time on setup rather than the campy monsters that have brought it a cult following. Writing in The Zombie Movie Encyclopedia, academic Peter Dendle called it an "energetic but directionless fiend-fest". Dendle praised the acting and serious nature of the first hour but said later scenes cause the tone to "just get silly".
