= The Young, the Evil and the Savage =

- Italian film poster
- Directed by: Antonio Margheriti
- Produced by: Lawrence Woolner; Giuseppe De Blasio
- Starring: Mark Damon; Eleonora Brown; Sally Smith; Patrizia Valturri; Michael Rennie
- Cinematography: Fausto Zuccoli
- Edited by: Otello Colangeli
- Music by: Carlo Savina
- Production companies: Super International Pictures; B.G.A.
- Distributed by: Variety Distribution
- Release date: 20 February 1968 (Italy)
- Running time: 97 minutes
- Country: Italy

The Young, the Evil and the Savage (Italian: Nude... si muore, lit. 'Naked... you die'), also known as Schoolgirl Killer, is a 1968 Italian giallo film directed by Antonio Margheriti.

== Plot ==
A woman is drowned in a bathtub and then placed in a trunk that lands in a pickup truck going to St. Hilda College. Among the teachers is a newcomer, Mrs. Clay, a science teacher. In addition, there is a young teacher, Richard Barrett, a diving instructor, and the college gardener La Foret. There are only seven girls at the institute, as the others are on vacation. Arrived at the destination, the trunk is brought to the basement.

Soon one of the girls, Betty Ann, who had gone to the basement, is strangled and taken away. The search for the missing girl begins. Jill claims Betty Ann is dead and was killed by the gardener. The girls are told not to leave their rooms, but one, Lucille, has an appointment with her teacher Richard, with whom she has been carrying on an affair. Lucille defies the lockdown and goes to a small house on a hill, where she discovers Betty Ann's body and runs away. She meets Richard and tells him everything. When they return, Betty Ann's body is gone. Lucille is desperate to leave school, so Richard advises her to pack and wait for him at the pool.

Lucille returns to boarding school, and while she takes a shower, the gardener spies on her from a tree. She notices strange movements on the plant and returns to the room frightened. Another girl, Cynthia, takes a shower and is killed in front of the gardener. Jill finds the body, and the police are called. Shortly after the agents arrive, the gardener is killed. Lucille wants to escape because she believes Cynthia was accidentally killed in her place. Meanwhile, she entrusts herself to a classmate, Denise, and tells her about the date with Richard at the pool. As she has to be questioned by the police, she asks her friend to go to her place. Denise accepts and is attacked by the killer, but Jill, who has followed her, intervenes, though the attacker escapes. The police dogs finally find the body of Betty Ann.

Through the course of investigation, it is discovered Lucille comes from an affluent family, and is due to inherit a large windfall on her birthday, which is the next day. She has been trying to contact a relative who has been administering her trust in the meantime, but cannot reach them. Lucille has another encounter with Richard near a lime pond, which is interrupted by Mrs. Clay, and they leave. Shortly after, the body of Mrs. Clay has been found in the lime pool by police.

Lucille is determined to leave the school with Richard. She finds him standing in the window of his quarters, but when she enters and calls to him, Richard's unconscious body is pushed down the stairs. The killer reveals himself: it is Pierre, Lucille's cousin, who has been disguising himself as Mrs. Clay at the school. He has been spending Lucille's inheritance, and has set to kill her to capture the remainder of the money, and blame it on the real Mrs. Clay, whom he earlier murdered and shipped to the school in the trunk, using the body to stage her death as a suicide.

Pierre wounds Richard, but Inspector Durand kills him. Tranquility returns to college, and Lucille and Richard end up together.

== Cast ==
- Mark Damon as Richard Barrett
- Eleonora Brown as Lucille Moffat
- Sally Smith as Jill
- Michael Rennie as Inspector Durand
- Patrizia Valturri as Denise
- Ludmilla Lvova as Mrs. Clay / Pierre Moffat
- Alan Collins as La Foret
- Franco De Rosa as Detective Gabon
- Caterina Trentini (credited as Katleen Parker) as Betty Ann
- Malisa Longo as Cynthia Fellows
- Vivian Stapleton as Miss Transfield
- Ester Masing as Miss Martin
- Aldo De Carellis as Professor André
- Giovanni Di Benedetto (credited as John Hawkwood) as Di Brazzi
- Silvia Dionisio as Margaret
- Lorenza Guerrieri as Wendy
- Valentino Macchi as Policeman

== Production ==
The Young, the Evil and the Savage was originally developed as a project for Mario Bava. Bava was contacted by producer Lawrence Woolner of the Woolner Brothers, who had distributed his films Hercules in the Haunted World and Blood and Black Lace in the United States. Woolner had relocated to Rome to set up a new independent production company with Giuseppe De Blasio. Woolner approached Bava with a story idea about a killer stalking a school for young debutantes. Bava accepted the offer to direct the film, which at the time had the title Cry Nightmare. In either late May or early June, he began working with the English writing team of Brian Degas and Tudor Gates. The film's screenplay was completed in July. According to Mario Bava's son, Lamberto Bava, "Just a short time before the filming was to begin, [Mario] had an argument with the producers and he abandoned the film."

The film's director, Antonio Margheriti, stated that he initially became involved with the Woolner Brothers as they had distributed his film Castle of Blood. Margheriti stated he did not recall why Bava did not complete the film, stating that "I think Mario was busy at that time, working on Diabolik or something", and then they gave the production to him and his production company. According to Bava's biographer Tim Lucas, Margheriti took over production shortly after Bava left, as locations had already been scouted for and secured, cast and crew had been hired, and a theme song had been written and recorded.

The film was shot on location in Rome and on the French Riviera under a new title, Sette vergini per il diavolo (transl. Seven Virgins for the Devil).

== Release ==
The Young, the Evil and the Savage was submitted to the Italian censors on December 22, 1967, but the film was not released for another two months until it premiered under the title Nude...si muore on February 20, 1968. Bava, Gates and Degas received no screenwriting credit for their work on the film; the film instead credits Margheriti and Franco Bottari for writing the screenplay from a story credited to Giovanni Simonelli. Lucas stated that the film follows Bava, Gates and Degas' script "almost 100% faithfully."

The film was released in the United States by American International Pictures in a 78 minute edit as The Young, the Evil and the Savage, where it opened in New York as on August 14, 1968 on a double bill with Witchfinder General.

Short-lived video label Ariel International Releasing (AIR) issued the film on VHS in 1987 under the title Schoolgirl Killer in its shortened English version. Dark Sky Films issued it on DVD in 2007 under the title Naked You Die in its full Italian-language version with English subtitles. Vinegar Syndrome reissued it on BluRay in 2024, again under its Naked You Die title, offering both the complete Italian-language version and the shortened English-language version.

Margheriti retrospectively described the film as a "nice little giallo", noting that it was ahead of its time, as the giallo did not gain high popularity in Italy until the release of Dario Argento's The Bird with the Crystal Plumage.

== Reception ==
In a contemporary review, David McGillivray found the film to be a "succession of tame and predictable murders [...] investigated with understandable indifference by Michael Rennie" and concluded that the film "will come as a grave disappointment to those who recall "Anthony Dawson's" flair for atmospherics in his earlier horror films."
