= Bury Me an Angel =

- Theatrical release poster
- Directed by: Barbara Peeters
- Written by: Barbara Peeters
- Produced by: Roger Corman; Rita Murray; John Meier; Paul Nobert; Beach Dickerson
- Starring: Dixie Peabody; Terry Mace; Clyde Ventura
- Cinematography: Sven Walnum
- Edited by: Tony de Zarraga
- Music by: Bill Cone; Richard Hieronymus; East-West Pipeline
- Production company: Meier-Murray Productions
- Distributed by: New World Pictures
- Release date: 1971
- Running time: 89 minutes
- Country: United States
- Language: English
- Budget: $60,000

Bury Me an Angel is a 1971 American biker film from director Barbara Peeters, who was script supervisor on Angels Die Hard (1970). She was the first woman to direct a biker film. The film was acquired by Roger Corman's New World Pictures.

== Plot ==
After learning that her brother has been murdered, biker Dag (Dixie Peabody) sets out on the road with two close friends to find the killer. As they travel, they encounter various people and conflicts, and Dag’s emotional struggle becomes increasingly apparent, leading to a final violent confrontation with her brother’s murderer.

== Cast ==
- Dixie Peabody as Dag
- Terry Mace as Jonsie
- Clyde Ventura as Bernie
- Joanne Moore Jordan as Annie
- Marie Denn as Bernice
- Dennis Peabody as Dennis
- Stephen Whittaker as The Killer
- Gary Littlejohn as Bike Shop Proprietor
- David Atkins as Preacher
- Janelle Pransky as Dag as a Little Girl
- Beach Dickerson as Harry
- Dan Haggerty as Ken

== Production ==
Barbara Peeters first conceived the idea for the film when, while working on Richard Compton's biker drama Angels Die Hard, supporting player Rita Murray told her she was looking to produce films of her own.

Peeters invented the plot on the spot, and rush-wrote a first draft overnight to present to Murray and her investors days later. She was given $90,000 to make the film. Peeters said she made the film for $60,000 and gave the balance back to the investors. "How stupid can you be?" she later laughed.

Peeters had made films before but says this was her "first real movie that was mine."

Beach Dickerson has a small role and helped produce the movie, which was shot on location in California. The script's original title was The Hunt.

Peeters said she cast Peabody because "She was gorgeous she was six feet tall she was a biker." The film also marked the first speaking role for Dan Haggerty.

Peeters included a scene where a head spewed blood because "it's a story about a girl who goes slowly insane while looking for her brother's killer. How could I make the audience understand what she's going through unless they are shocked in the same way she was."

Peeters cast some real bikers with whom she had worked with on other biker movies.

== Release ==
Peeters received a distribution contract from Roger Corman for the movie and she worked for him for the next eight years.

Corman said Peeters "did quite a good job" and thought "the film was notable because Barbara got a really beautiful girl to play the lead who was really striking on the motorcycle. We used her in the ads, in the trailers, and on TV dates."

== See also ==
- List of American films of 1971
