= Valley of the Redwoods =

1960 film by William Witney

- Theatrical release poster
- Directed by: William Witney
- Screenplay by: Leo Gordon; Daniel Madison
- Story by: Gene Corman
- Produced by: Gene Corman
- Starring: John Hudson; Lynette Bernay; Ed Nelson; Michael Forest; Robert Shayne; John Brinkley
- Cinematography: Kay Norton
- Edited by: Marshall Neilan Jr.
- Music by: Buddy Bregman
- Production company: Associated Producers Incorporated
- Distributed by: 20th Century Fox
- Release date: May 8, 1960
- Running time: 63 minutes
- Country: United States
- Language: English
- Budget: $70-80,000 est.

Valley of the Redwoods is a 1960 American Thriller film directed by William Witney, written by Leo Gordon and Daniel Madison, and starring John Hudson, Lynette Bernay, Ed Nelson, Michael Forest, Robert Shayne and John Brinkley. It was released on May 8, 1960, by 20th Century Fox.

== Cast ==
- John Hudson as Wayne Randall
- Lynette Bernay as Jan Spencer
- Ed Nelson as Dino Michaelis
- Michael Forest as Dave Harris
- Robert Shayne as Capt. Sid Walker
- John Brinkley as Willie Chadwick
- Bruno VeSota as Joe Wolcheck
- Hal Torey as Philip Blair
- Chris Miller as Charlotte Walker

== Production ==
Filming started December 1959.

== Reception ==
Gene Corman says that Fox head of production Buddy Adler "particularly liked" the film. It was one of Corman's personal favorites of the films he made.
