= Ed Nelson =

American actor, AMPAs member; mayor (1928–2014)

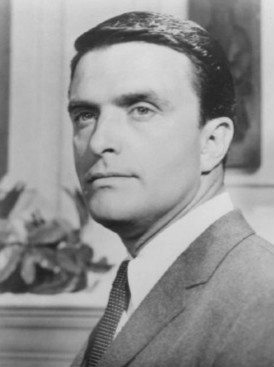
- Nelson as Dr. Michael Rossi in Peyton Place
- Born: Edwin Stafford Nelson; December 21, 1928; New Orleans, Louisiana, U.S.
- Died: August 9, 2014 (aged 85); Greensboro, North Carolina, U.S.
- Education: Tulane University
- Occupation: Actor
- Years active: 1952–2003
- Spouse: Patricia Miller "Patsy" Nelson (m. 1951)
- Children: 6

Edwin Stafford Nelson (December 21, 1928 – August 9, 2014) was an American actor, best known for his role as Dr. Michael Rossi in the television series Peyton Place, for which he was nominated for a Photoplay Award in 1967.

Nelson appeared in episodes of many TV programs, more than 50 movies, and hundreds of stage productions.

== Early life ==
Born in New Orleans, Louisiana, Nelson was raised in North Carolina.

He was educated at Edwards Military Institute and Camp Lejeune High School, playing football and basketball at the latter school.

He began acting while attending Tulane University in New Orleans. He left college after two years to study at the New York School of Radio and Television Technique.

== Career ==
Nelson served in the U.S. Navy as a radioman on the light cruiser USS Dayton. He then took a position as a director at WDSU-TV in New Orleans. By 1956, acting was his focus, and he moved to the Los Angeles area.

Nelson acted and did stunt work for B-movie producer Roger Corman on the films Swamp Women (1956), Attack of the Crab Monsters (1957), Rock All Night (1957), Carnival Rock (1957), Night of the Blood Beast (1958), The Cry Baby Killer (1958), Teenage Cave Man (1958), and A Bucket of Blood (1959). In 1958, he acted in and produced actor-director Bruno VeSota's science-fiction/horror movie The Brain Eaters, with Roger Corman as the executive producer. The same year, he was cast as the lead in Devil's Partner, but the movie was not released until 1962. He also appeared in the 1960 thriller Valley of the Redwoods and the 1963 comedy drama Soldier in the Rain, starring Steve McQueen and Jackie Gleason.

Nelson's television career featured many guest-starring roles, such as the talented, arrogant Dr. Wade Parsons in the 1962 episode "Doctor on Horseback" of the western series The Tall Man.

Nelson was cast in episodes of such other westerns as Maverick, Wagon Train, Black Saddle, Have Gun – Will Travel, The Rebel (five times), Johnny Ringo, Gunsmoke, Rawhide, Tombstone Territory, Bat Masterson, Laramie, Bonanza, Stoney Burke, The Dakotas, The Rifleman and Redigo. He appeared on drama and adventure series too, such as Combat!, The Fugitive, The Twilight Zone, Flight, The Silent Service, The Untouchables, The Outer Limits, Harbor Command, Tightrope!, Coronado 9, The Eleventh Hour, Thriller, and Channing. He guest-starred on Mission: Impossible, Highway Patrol, and military sitcom/drama Hennesey.

He made two guest appearances on Perry Mason, both times as the defendant; in 1961, he played Ward Nichols in "The Case of the Left-Handed Liar," and in 1964, he played Dirk Blake, father of the title character, in "The Case of the Missing Button". He played rival mystery writer Tom Keller opposite James Mason as Warren Barrow on The Alfred Hitchcock Hour S1 E5 "Captive Audience" (1962). He also portrayed an assistant district attorney on the TV series Adam-12 in 1974.

== Peyton Place and later roles ==
In 1964, Nelson secured his most famous role, portraying Dr. Michael Rossi on the drama Peyton Place, staying with the series during its entire run from 1964 to 1969. Nelson reprised his role in two TV movies: Murder in Peyton Place and Peyton Place: The Next Generation.

After Peyton Place, Nelson worked in many more productions of all varieties. He teamed with former Peyton Place co-star Percy Rodriguez in the television series The Silent Force, which ran for 15 episodes in 1970–1971. He guest-starred with David Janssen in The Fugitive in 1963, and appeared as a different character later in the series. Subsequently, Nelson had guest-starring roles on many of the popular dramas of the 1970s and 1980s, including Marcus Welby, M.D., Laramie, Cannon, O'Hara, U.S. Treasury, Night Gallery, Banacek, Alias Smith and Jones, The Mod Squad, Mission: Impossible, The Streets of San Francisco, Kung Fu, The F.B.I. (in 3 different roles), Adam-12, Ironside, Police Woman, Medical Center (3 roles), The Bionic Woman, Gibbsville, McMillan and Wife, Dallas, The Rockford Files (2 roles), Barnaby Jones (2 roles), Charlie's Angels, Lou Grant, Trapper John, M.D., Vega$ (2 roles), CHiPs, Quincy, M.E., Matt Houston, The Fall Guy, Dynasty, Cagney & Lacey, MacGyver, Jake and the Fatman (2 roles), and Murder, She Wrote (5 roles).

Nelson appeared in many television movies such as Along Came a Spider (1970), The Screaming Woman (1972), Runaway! (1973), Houston, We've Got a Problem (1974), The Missing Are Deadly (1975), Superdome (1978), Doctors' Private Lives (1978) and Crash (1978). He hosted the morning talk show The Ed Nelson Show for three years. During the 1980s, Nelson took on the role of patriarchal Senator Mark Denning in the daytime serial Capitol. In late 1986, Nelson was upset to discover that the show's writers had turned his character into a traitor, and quit the show in disgust, last airing in early January 1987, two months before the show's cancellation.

He also continued appearing in theatrical films, such as Airport 1975 (1974), That's the Way of the World (1975), Acapulco Gold (1976), Midway (1976), For the Love of Benji (1977), Police Academy 3: Back in Training (1986), Brenda Starr (1989), The Boneyard (1991), Who Am I? (1998) and Runaway Jury (2003).

He spent several years playing U.S. President Harry S. Truman on stage, replacing James Whitmore for the National Tour of Give 'Em Hell, Harry.

== Personal life ==
While living in Los Angeles, Nelson was an active member of the Screen Actors Guild and was elected to the union board for many years. Nelson was a long-standing member of the Academy of Motion Picture Arts and Sciences. In the early 1970s, he ran for city council and mayor of San Dimas, California until a Federal Communications Commission ruling stated that his political opponents must be given equal time if he appeared in television programs.

== Later years ==
In 1999, Nelson returned to Tulane University to finish credits toward his undergraduate degree, which he completed the following year at age 71. He and his wife, Patsy, enjoyed semi-retirement visiting their six children and 14 grandchildren. One of his children is actor Christopher S. Nelson.

Until 2005, he had been teaching acting and screenwriting in New Orleans at two local universities. Hurricane Katrina prompted him to move his family far to the north to Sterlington, Louisiana. At the time of his death, however, he had moved to Greensboro, North Carolina, where he had been in hospice care. He died at age 85.

== Death ==
Nelson died on August 9, 2014, in Greensboro, North Carolina from congestive heart failure. He was 85 years old.

== Selected filmography ==
- The Steel Trap (1952) as Man in Ticket Line at Airport
- New Orleans Uncensored (1955) as Charlie
- Swamp Women (1956) as Police Sergeant
- Attack of the Crab Monsters (1957) as Ensign Quinlan
- Rock All Night (1957) as Pete
- Invasion of the Saucer Men (1957) as Tom
- Bayou (1957) as Etienne
- Hell on Devil's Island (1957) as Guard No. 2
- Teenage Doll (1957) as Police Officer 'Dutch' / Blind Man
- Carnival Rock (1957) as Cannon
- Street of Darkness (1958) as Slavo
- Teenage Caveman (1958) as Blond Tribe Member
- She Gods of Shark Reef (1958) as Guard
- Devil's Partner (filmed in 1958, released in 1961) as Nick Richards / Pete Jensen
- Night of the Blood Beast (1958) as Dave Randall
- The Cry Baby Killer (1958) as Rick Connor
- Hot Car Girl (1958) as Second Cop at Soda Bar
- The Brain Eaters (1958) as Dr. Paul Kettering
- I Mobster (1959) as Sid - Henchman
- The Young Captives (1959) as Norm Britt
- T-Bird Gang (1959) as Alex Hendricks
- A Bucket of Blood (1959) as Art Lacroix
- Valley of the Redwoods (1960) as Dino Michaelis
- Code of Silence (1960) as Paul Lane
- Elmer Gantry (1960) as Man on Phone at Sister Sharon Headquarters
- Judgment at Nuremberg (1961) as Captain at Nightclub Announcing Call-up of Officers
- Soldier in the Rain (1963) as MP Sergeant James Priest
- Along Came a Spider (1970) as Dr. Martin Becker
- The Screaming Woman (1972) as Carl Nesbitt
- Time to Run (1973) as Warren Cole
- Airport 1975 (1974) as Major John Alexander
- That's the Way of the World (1975) as Carlton James
- Acapulco Gold (1976) as Ray Hollister
- Midway (1976) as Admiral Harry Pearson
- For the Love of Benji (1977) as Chandler Dietrich
- Police Academy 3: Back in Training (1986) as Governor Neilson
- Brenda Starr (1989) as President Harry S. Truman
- Deadly Weapon (1989) as General Stone
- The Boneyard (1991) as Jersey Callum
- Cries of Silence (1996) as Dr. August Claiborne
- Who Am I? (1998) as General Sherman
- Tony Bravo in Scenes from a Forgotten Cinema (2000) as Ghost of Mary's Dad
- Runaway Jury (2003) as George Dressler

== Selected television ==
- Highway Patrol (1957) as Monty in "Wounded"
- Have Gun - Will Travel (1959) as Will Gage in Season 2, Episode 31 "The Man Who Lost"
- Have Gun - Will Travel (1959) as Ed Stacy in Season 2, Episode 35 "Homecoming"
- Have Gun - Will Travel (1959) as Pierre Deverell in Season 3, Episode 9 "The Black Handkerchief"
- Have Gun - Will Travel (1960) as Carl - Gambler in Season 3, Episode 32 "Ambush"
- The Rifleman (1960) as Stacey Beldon in Season 3, Episode 9 "Dead Cold Cash"
- The Rifleman (1960) as Ben Travis in Season 3, Episode 12 "The Illustrator"
- The Rifleman (1961) as Ben Vargas in Season 4, Episode 2 "First Wages"
- Gunsmoke (1961) as Perce McCall in Season 7, Episode 1 "Perce"
- Perry Mason (1961) as Ward Nichols
- Have Gun - Will Travel (1961) as Rack in Season 4, Episode 33 "Brothers Keeper"
- Bat Masterson (1961) as Outlaw Browder
- Rawhide (1961) as Lieutenant Cory Clemens in S3:E26, "Incident of the Painted Lady"
- Gunsmoke (1962) as Seth Owen in Season 7, Episode 33 " The Prisoner"
- Death Valley Days (1962) as Frank Girard in Episode "Fort Bowie:Urgent"
- Bonanza (1962) as Garth in Episode: "The Miracle Maker"
- The Alfred Hitchcock Hour (1962) (Season 1 Episode 5: "Captive Audience") as Tom Keller
- The Twilight Zone (1963) (Season 4, Episode 3: "Valley of the Shadow") as Philip Redfield
- The Alfred Hitchcock Hour (1963) (Season 1 Episode 21: "I'll Be Judge - I'll Be Jury") as Alex Trevor
- Wagon Train (1963) S6 E34 "Alias Bill Hawks" as the murderous water prospector Burke Clayton
- The Man from Galveston (1963) (television pilot for Temple Houston) as Cole Marteen
- Gunsmoke (1964) as Tom King in Season 9, Episode 24 "Father’s Love"
- Combat! (1964) as Burgess in Episode: "The Eyes of the Hunter"
- Perry Mason (1964) as Dirk Blake
- Houston, We've Got a Problem (1974) as Gene Kranz in made-for-tv movie
- The Rockford Files (1977) as Edgar 'Bud' Clement in "Trouble in Chapter 17"
