= Shell Shock (film) =

1964 film by John Hayes

- Directed by: John Hayes
- Written by: Randy Fields; John Hayes
- Produced by: Beach Dickerson
- Music by: Jaime Mendoza-Nava
- Production company: Exclusive International Pictures
- Distributed by: Parade Releasing Organization
- Release date: 1964
- Running time: 84 min.
- Country: United States
- Language: English

Shell Shock, also known as 82nd Marines Attack, is a 1964 film B-movie directed and co-written by John Hayes and produced by and starring Beach Dickerson. The film takes place in Italy during World War II, and tells the story of a sergeant with his group of soldiers.

== Cast ==
- Beach Dickerson as Rance
- Carl Crow as Johnny Wade
- Frank Leo as Gil Evans
- Pamela Grey as Maria
- William Guhl as Wrigley
- Max Huber as Major
- Dolores Faith as American girl
