= The Las Vegas Hillbillys =

1966 film by Arthur C. Pierce

- Theatrical release poster
- Directed by: Arthur C. Pierce
- Written by: Larry Jackson
- Produced by: Larry Jackson
- Starring: Jayne Mansfield; Mamie Van Doren
- Cinematography: William De Diego
- Music by: Dean Elliott
- Distributed by: Woolner Brothers
- Release date: 1966
- Running time: 90 minutes
- Country: United States
- Language: English

The Las Vegas Hillbillys is a 1966 American country music comedy film directed by Arthur C. Pierce and starring Jayne Mansfield and Mamie Van Doren. The 1967 sequel film Hillbillys in a Haunted House followed with a similar cast.

== Plot ==
Woody Woodrow, a hillbilly whose family makes and sells moonshine in rural Tennessee, inherits a Las Vegas casino and plans to turn it into a country and western bar. The rundown establishment is far outside the town. The hillbillies think that they can successfully promote country music.

Boots Malone (Van Doren) is hired as hostess and business manager. Gangsters to whom the previous owners owed amount of money keep coming around to collect, with a very large enforcer played by Richard Kiel.

Woody eventually manages to talk well-known country singers into appearing there; and pays off the debt.

Woody then orders his staff to throw pies at the gangsters as they leave.

== Cast ==
- Ferlin Husky as Woody
- Jayne Mansfield as Tawny
- Mamie Van Doren as Boots Malone
- Don Bowman as Jeepers
- Billie Bird as Ma
- Bill Anderson as himself
- Wilma Burgess as herself
- Roy Drusky as himself
- Sonny James as himself
- Duke of Paducah as himself
- Del Reeves as himself
- Connie Smith as herself
- Robert V. Barron as Donald
- Louis Quinn
- Richard Kiel
- John Harmon
- Helen Clark
- Bennett King
- Tony Posey

== See also ==
- List of American films of 1966
- List of films set in Las Vegas
