= The Phantom Planet =

1961 film by William Marshall

- Theatrical release poster
- Directed by: William Marshall
- Screenplay by: William Telaak; Fred De Gorter; Fred Gebhardt
- Story by: Fred Gebhardt
- Produced by: Fred Gebhardt
- Starring: Dean Fredericks; Coleen Gray; Anthony Dexter; Francis X. Bushman; Richard Kiel
- Cinematography: Elwood J. Nicholson
- Edited by: Hugo Grimaldi
- Music by: Leith Stevens
- Production company: Four Crown Productions Inc.
- Distributed by: American International Pictures
- Release date: December 13, 1961 (U.S.)
- Running time: 90 minutes
- Country: United States
- Language: English

The Phantom Planet is a 1961 independently made American black-and-white science fiction film produced by Fred Gebhardt, directed by William Marshall, and starring Dean Fredericks, Coleen Gray, Anthony Dexter, and Francis X. Bushman. It was the first credited appearance of Richard Kiel, although he is not identifiable in the masked monster costume used for the film. The Phantom Planet was released on December 13, 1961 in the U.S. by American International Pictures as a double feature with Assignment Outer Space (1960).

The film was featured on the television series Mystery Science Theater 3000 as episode #902.

== Plot ==
The Phantom Planet

It is 1980, and the United States Air Force's Space Exploration Wing has bases on the Moon and is on the eve of a mission to Mars. When another of its two-member crewed Pegasus spacecraft mysteriously disappears, rumors begin circulating of space monsters and phantom planets. Captain Frank Chapman and his navigator Lieutenant Ray Makonnen are ordered to investigate.

During the search, their spaceship suffers damage from a meteor shower, requiring that both men go outside to make repairs. A bullet-sized particle, however, pierces the air hose on Chapman's space suit, rendering him unconscious. Makonnen is able to repair the hose, but as he opens the airlock hatch, he is fatally struck by a similar particle. Makonnen's last act before being propelled into deep space is to push Chapman inside and close the airlock hatch. Chapman comes to and finds Makonnen gone and himself unable to communicate with the lunar base. He records a log entry about the preceding events, noting that he now must make a forced landing on an asteroid, that it is somehow pulling in his Pegasus spaceship.

Exiting his ship while still feeling the effects of the accident, Chapman collapses and sees tiny humanoids about six inches tall approaching. Once his helmet visor is opened, he can breathe but shrinks to their size due to the asteroid's atmosphere. He is taken underground.

Sesom, the aged and wise ruler of Rheton (the native name for the rocky and seemingly lifeless planetoid where Chapman has landed), explains that though his craft was brought down safely by their gravitational tractor beam, they had not been able to do the same with the preceding Earth spaceships that came near, which were completely destroyed, along with their crews, when they crashed on Rheton's surface. He informs Chapman that he never can leave but will have all the rights of a citizen of Rheton. As he slept, Chapman's spaceship was sent into space to keep Rheton's existence a secret, and more importantly, their world's gravitational technology, which allows the Rhetonians to navigate their world through space.

Chapman meets two beautiful women: Sessom's smugly spoiled blond daughter Liara and the gentle but mute black-haired Zetha. Liara is more than willing to answer his many questions about Rheton. Sesom informs Chapman that he later may marry one of the women once he has become accustomed to living on Rheton.

Liara, after following and engaging constantly with Chapman, declares her love for him, but Chapman, still eager to return to his own people, quietly rejects her. Herron, a young man who is in love with Liara, attempts to win her for himself by lying to Sesom, telling him Chapman is attempting to win over both women.

Stating that he believes this to be a crime against the people of Rheton, Herron requests a duel to the death. Chapman agrees, and the two engage in a form of combat where opponents must push each other onto gravity plates that cause immediate disintegration when touched. Just as Chapman is about to push Herron onto a plate, he lets Herron go, stating that he cannot kill someone for no reason.

As time goes on, Chapman and the mute Zetha become acquainted and eventually fall in love. Herron comes to Chapman late one night and offers to help him escape.

Any plans for the future, however, are put on hold when Chapman discovers the reason for Rheton's erratic course through space: It is because the planetoid is being attacked by the Solarites, an alien race of "fire people" from an unidentified "sun satellite". They want to destroy Rheton with their flaming fighter craft so they can steal its secret of gravitational control.

With Chapman's help, Sessom and Herron destroy the enemy fleet using a gravity beam. During the battle, a giant 7-foot tall Solarite prisoner, captured during a previous raid, escapes when the gravity barrier holding him fails. Stalking corridors, the creature captures Zetha, who previously had been traumatized into silence by a childhood encounter with the savage species. After Sesom is attacked by this bug-eyed monster, Chapman and Herron attempt to rescue Zetha. Chapman defeats the Solarite by pushing it onto a gravity plate.

While kidnapped, Zetha's muteness vanished when she saw Chapman about to be attacked by the creature, and she was able to scream, warning him. The return of her voice allows her to later confess her love for him. The two kiss, but Zetha knows that he must return to his home world. They are interrupted when a search party (Captain Beecher and Lieutenant White) from Earth locates Chapman. In order to preserve the secret of his adopted people, Chapman crawls inside his spacesuit, and after once more being exposed to atmospheric gases from Earth, he returns to his normal size. Reluctantly, he goes with the search party, leaving Zetha and the miniature world of Rheton behind.

== Cast ==
- Dean Fredericks as Captain Frank Chapman: The protagonist. An Earth astronaut who accidentally crashes onto the "phantom planet". As captain in the United States Air Force Space Exploration Wing and pilot at Pegasus IV assigned to Lunar Base 1, the unusual atmosphere and gravity shrink him down to the tiny size of the planet's native inhabitants while trying to return to Earth.
- Coleen Gray as Liara: Sessom's daughter, a young Rhetonian woman who befriends Chapman on the planet.
- Anthony Dexter as Herron: A suspicious and jealous Rhetonian warrior, who becomes Chapman's rival in the attempt to win Liara's love away from him, then upon becoming his ally.
- Francis X. Bushman as Sessom: The wise supreme ruler and leader governor of Rheton and Liara's father, who judges Chapman and rules over the trial regarding his fate, serves as his primary judge, host, and eventual benefactor, guiding the Earth astronaut through the laws and customs of Rehtonian culture.
- Dolores Faith as Zetha: An (initially) mute Rhetonian woman who falls in love with Chapman. After being frightened by the captured Solarite, she regains her voice upon having her life saved.
- Dick Haynes as Coronel Lansfield: The high-ranking military commander of the United States Air Force Space Exploration Wing Lunar Base 1, who assists Chapman with the mission of investigating the mystery of the lost Pegasus ships, with the aim of maintaining contact with him (especially especially to General Gibson's messages at the headquarters at Earth regarding the mystery of a "phantom planet" who assists with the mission when hiring Chapman).
- Richard Weber as Lieutenant Ray Makonnen: The navigator of the Pegasus VI ship and Chapman's close friend who assist the mission of the lost Pegasus ships. After trying to save Chapman from a meteor shower, he ends up dying in space, floating far away leaving alone on the spaceship.
- Earl McDaniel as Captain Leonard: The disappeared pilot of the Pegasus III, who crashes and dies by the asteroid Rheton after conducting research in space the eve a mission to Mars, in the movie's analogue.
- Jimmy Weldon as Lt. Webb: The disappeared navigator of the Pegasus III and companion to Leonard who dies with him by the planetoid Rheton in the analogue.
- John Herrin as Captain Beecher: The distinguished pilot hired by Lansfield on the rescue party ship tasked with searching for the Pegasus VI in order to mission to rescue Chapman.
- Mike Marshall as Lt. White: The rescue party ship's navigator and Beecher's trusted companion hired by Lansfield who is assisting in the mission to try to rescue and search Chapman.
- Lori Lyons as the radar officer.
- Akemi Tani as the communications officer.
- Mel Curtis as Lieutenant Cutler: The associate United States Air Force Space Exploration Wing stationed at Lunar Base 1 officer and attendant under Lansfield, who assists in the mystery mission to regarding the lost Pegasus ships and Chapman's missing contact.
- Al Jarvis as Judge Eden: The chef magistrate and legal authority officer of the microscopic civilization on the wandering asteroid Rheton, who presides over Chapman's trial. Sitting alongside the supreme ruler, Sessom, Judge Eden acts as the official legal voice of their society. He introduces Captain Chapman to the laws of the planetoid and strictly oversees the outsider's initial tribunal and sentencing Explains gravity-plate duel rules.
- Richard Kiel as the Solarite: A monstrous, fire-hurling alien antagonist belonging to a hostile species at war with Rheton, until the captured Solarite escapes from the planetoid with the under tractor beam.
- Warrene Ott as Ipsalata: A Rhetonian woman resident on the trial.

Additionally, Susan Cembrowska, Merissa Mathes, Gloria Moreland, Judy Erickson, Sally Carter-Ihnat, Allyson Ames, and Marion Thompson. They appear in the film as the jury of the women of Rheton. Marvin Miller and Leon Selznick as the introductory and normal narrator in the film.

== Production ==
Director William Marshall, a former actor and bandleader, had previously made two films, Hello God and Adventures of Captain Fabian, with Errol Flynn. His son Mike Marshall made his debut in The Phantom Planet. Screenwriter and co-producer Fred Gebhardt previously produced and wrote the screenplay for Columbia Pictures 1960 science fiction film 12 to the Moon. Star Dean Fredericks had just finished filming the lead in the NBC TV series Steve Canyon, which was later cancelled after its first season of 34 episodes. Co-star Francis X. Bushman had been a major film star in silent films. This was actor Richard Kiel's first credited film role in which he played the captured Solarite.

The Phantom Planet's interior spaceship sets, spacesuit helmets, oxygen backpacks, and special effects originally appeared in the Ziv Company's science fiction television series Men into Space, which was broadcast on CBS TV in 1959.

== Reception ==
The Monthly Film Bulletin wrote: "A corny slice of SF hokum which seeks inspiration from all quarters. The Lilliputian idea quickly gets forgotten; the gravity control unit is operated by hand-waving and looks as if it should produce a tune (like musical glasses); a monster is to hand in the person of a captured Solarite, and though his appearance is brief it suffices to allow him to perform his function of carrying off the heroine. The only interest is the appearance of veteran Francis X. Bushman, who plays the Rheton leader."

Boxoffice wrote: "Fredericks is a right handsome, grim-visaged hero, given to acts of herculean feats. William Marshall's direction, conventionally developed, tells the story with little frills."

== Home media ==
- The Phantom Planet has received multiple DVD "bargain bin" releases as a result of being in the public domain.
- A colorized version of The Phantom Planet was released by Legend Films.
- A restored widescreen version, remastered from a 35 mm print, was released December 10, 2017 on BD-R by Snappy Video, an imprint of Thunderbean Animation.
- The Mystery Science Theater 3000 version of the film was released on DVD by Rhino Home Video as part of its Collection, Volume 8 set. Shout Factory re-released the episode on November 15, 2018. The other episodes in the four-disc set include Hobgoblins (#907), Monster a Go-Go (#421), and The Dead Talk Back (#603).
- A 3D Blu-ray was released May 1, 2025.

== Legacy ==
- The film was adapted into a comic with some minor plot changes.
- Footage from the film was used in a 2010 advertising campaign for La Quinta Inns and Suites, an American hotel chain.
- The rock group Phantom Planet took their name from the film.

=== Mystery Science Theater 3000 ===
The Phantom Planet was featured in episode #902 of Mystery Science Theater 3000 (MST3K), debuting March 21, 1998, on the Sci-Fi Channel. Writer/performer Bill Corbett noted the movie's "many scenes of non-stop expositional chat", which made it a difficult episode to write for, as well as the similarity of actor Coleen Gray's role with her previous "devious vixen" role in The Leech Woman.

Writer Jim Vorel ranked the episode #91 (out of 197 total MST3K episodes) in his ranking of the series' first 12 seasons. Vorel writes The Phantom Planet is "both silly and introspective" and "takes itself considerably more seriously than anyone in the audience" could have while displaying "campy special effects ... during the rocketry scenes." Vorel also noted "anything involving the 'combat rod,' a wishbone-shaped stick that the aliens use to compete in inane gladiatorial games," was the film's highlight.

== See also ==
- List of American films of 1961
- List of films in the public domain in the United States
- List of films featuring miniature people
