= Teenage Caveman (1958 film) =

1958 film by Roger Corman

- Theatrical release poster by Reynold Brown
- Directed by: Roger Corman
- Written by: R. Wright Campbell
- Produced by: Roger Corman
- Starring: Robert Vaughn; Darah Marshall
- Cinematography: Floyd Crosby
- Edited by: Irene Morra
- Music by: Albert Glasser
- Distributed by: American International Pictures
- Release date: July 1, 1958
- Running time: 65 minutes
- Country: United States
- Language: English
- Budget: $70,000

Teenage Caveman (also known as Out of the Darkness in the United Kingdom) is a 1958 American independent black-and-white science fiction adventure film produced and directed by Roger Corman, and starring Robert Vaughn and Darah Marshall. The film was released by American International Pictures in July 1958 as a double feature with How to Make a Monster.

Originally filmed as Prehistoric World with some 8x10 publicity stills retaining this title, AIP later changed it. Years later, Corman stated in an interview, "I never directed a film called Teenage Caveman." Vaughn stated in an interview that he considered Teenage Caveman to be the worst film ever made. It was later featured on the mocking television series Mystery Science Theater 3000.

== Plot ==
A tribe of primitive humans live in a barren, rocky wasteland and struggle for survival, despite a lush, plant-filled land on the other side of a nearby river. They refuse to cross the river because of a law that evolved from an ancient tale, warning of a god lurking there who brings death with a single touch.

A young man of the tribe challenges the law and is eventually followed by other male members of his tribe, who fearfully cross the river in order to bring him back. They soon encounter the terrible god, a large, horribly burned but strangely human-like creature. Despite the young man's peace overture to the god, another tribal member, out of fear, lays a trap and stones the creature to death with a large rock; the young man then shoots and kills that tribesman with one of his arrows. The others gather around the now-dead god and discover that the creature is actually a much older man with long white hair. He is wearing some kind of strange, unknown outer garment with a fearful hood. They find another strange thing in the old man's possession; they are puzzled by this flat, thick object that opens and contains mysterious markings and vivid black, white and gray images that show an even stranger human world unknown to them.

In a surprising denouement provided by the old man after his death, the truth is revealed in voice-over as the tribesmen leaf through his book. He was actually a survivor of a long-ago nuclear holocaust, forced to live for decades inside his now-ragged, discolored and bulky radiation suit (which is implied to have once been covered with deadly radioactive fallout). The old man has wandered the land for decades, while the primitive remnants of a devastated human race have slowly increased their numbers; his frightening outer appearance caused them to fear and shun him.

A final, cautionary question is asked in voice-over by the old man: will humanity someday repeat its nuclear folly after civilization has once again risen to its former heights?

== Cast ==
- Robert Vaughn as Symbol Maker's Teenage Son
- Darah Marshall as Blonde Maiden
- Leslie Bradley as Symbol Maker
- Frank De Kova as Black-Bearded One
- Charles Thompson as Tribe Member
- June Jocelyn as Symbol Maker's Wife
- Jonathan Haze as Curly-Haired Boy
- Beach Dickerson as Fair-Haired Boy / Man from Burning Plains / Tom Tom Player / Bear
- Ed Nelson as Blonde Tribe Member
- Robert Shayne as Fire Maker
- Marshall Bradford as Tribe Member
- Joseph H. Hamilton as Tribe Member

== Production ==
Teenage Caveman was budgeted at $70,000.

Filming took place in May 1958 under the title Prehistoric World. It was theatrically released in July 1958.

While a number of scripts were considered to meet American International's directive to produce a historic picture, Corman used Bob Campbell's idea of setting the movie in the future. Corman and Campbell both disliked the title Teenage Caveman selected by American International, preferring their choice of Prehistoric World as the name of the movie.

== Reception ==
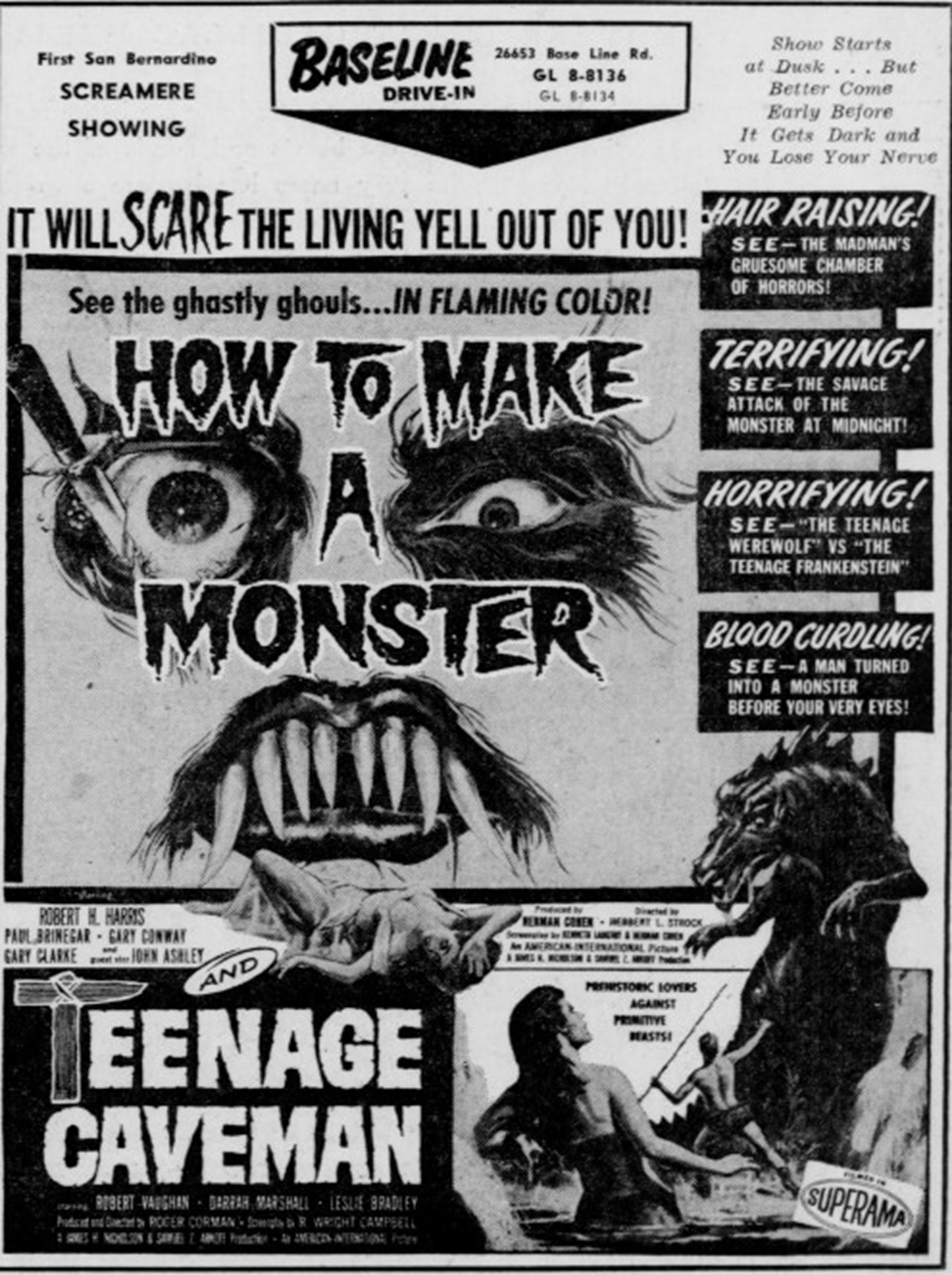
Drive-in advertisement from 1958 featuring How to Make a Monster with companion feature, Teenage Caveman.

Corman thought the film to be pretty good, but felt it could have been "genuinely good" had he had more time and more money. The Hollywood Reporter disliked the film and cited the film's low budget as a reason. The Monthly Film Bulletin said the film tried hard, but was ultimately unsuccessful.

Variety found the film to be a good exploitation item aimed at the teen market.

The Los Angeles Times found it to be a good movie despite its title.

== Home media ==
The film was released on DVD by Lionsgate Home Entertainment on April 18, 2006, as part of a two-disc set with The Saga of the Viking Women and Their Voyage to the Waters of the Great Sea Serpent on the first disc.

== Mystery Science Theater 3000 ==
Teenage Caveman was featured in episode 315 of Mystery Science Theater 3000, along with the shorts Aquatic Wizards and Catching Trouble. The episode debuted November 9, 1991, on Comedy Central. MST3K writer Mary Jo Pehl struggled "to find a positive thing to say about Teenage Caveman", in which Vaughn appeared to play "a thirty-something teenage caveman", and called Corman "a horrible director...[who] wasn't trying to make good films, just films that came in under budget".

The MST3K version of Teenage Caveman was included as part of the Mystery Science Theater 3000 Volume XXXV DVD collection, released by Shout! Factory on March 29, 2016.

== See also ==
- Survival film
