= The Human Duplicators =

1965 science fiction film

- Theatrical release poster
- Directed by: Hugo Grimaldi; Arthur C. Pierce (uncredited)
- Written by: Arthur C. Pierce
- Produced by: Hugo Grimaldi; Arthur C. Pierce
- Starring: George Nader; Dolores Faith; George Macready; Barbara Nichols; Richard Arlen; Richard Kiel; Hugh Beaumont
- Cinematography: Monroe P. Askins
- Edited by: Donald Wolfe
- Music by: Gordon Zahler
- Distributed by: Woolner Brothers Pictures Inc.
- Release date: March 3, 1965
- Running time: 80 minutes
- Country: United States
- Language: English
- Budget: $140,000

The Human Duplicators is a 1965 American science fiction film by Woolner Brothers Pictures Inc. Produced and directed by Hugo Grimaldi and Arthur C. Pierce (the latter uncredited as director), the film stars George Nader, Barbara Nichols, George Macready and Dolores Faith. It was shown in the US as a double feature with Mutiny in Outer Space.

The narrative follows a very tall space alien (Richard Kiel) who has come to Earth at the command of the "Intergalactic Council" to replace select humans with "android doppelgängers." The goal of human duplication is to take over the Earth, but the plan fails when the androids are destroyed by an investigator from the United States National Intelligence Agency.

== Plot ==
Aboard a spacecraft heading toward Earth, the head of the "Intergalactic Council" briefs Dr. Kolos, a gigantic humanoid alien, on his part to "expand our galaxy domination program." If Kolos succeeds, human duplicates—androids—will begin taking over. If he fails, he will be destroyed.

After arriving via "teletransporter" at the mansion of Dr. Vaughan Dornheimer, Kolos encounters Dornheimer's blind niece Lisa. Not realizing that he is an extraterrestrial, she takes Kolos to Dornheimer's laboratory. Kolos tells Dornheimer that together they will develop the sophisticated androids that Dornheimer is unable to create on his own. Dornheimer refuses, but Kolos makes clear that he is now "the master" and that he will be obeyed.

The police, meanwhile, are stymied by multiple thefts from high-security electronics facilities, apparently perpetrated by the "top scientists" who are employed there. Most baffling of all is Dr. Munson. After being admitted to his facility, he tears a security door off its hinges with his bare hands and kills a security guard. He then ignores shouted warnings to halt by a second guard, who shoots him four times in the back. Munson does not react to his wounds while escaping in his car. He is an android, although the police do not know it.

Glenn Martin of the National Intelligence Agency (NIA) takes over the case. Glenn fails to uncover any clues by later posing as a reporter at the home of Dr. Dornheimer, although he does encounter Lisa. He later sneaks into Dornheimer's lab and witnesses human duplication. Lisa tells him that Dornheimer has been replaced by an android. As she leaves, Glenn is attacked by an android version of Dornheimer's servant Thor. In the ensuing fight, Glenn smashes android Thor's head, destroying him. Kolos apprehends Glenn so that he can be duplicated.

After duplication, android Glenn returns to NIA headquarters, where Gale Wilson, Glenn's girlfriend and fellow agent, notices his oddly cold behavior. Concerned for his well-being, she decides to surreptitiously follow him.

Android Glenn goes to a facility to steal additional electronics needed for duplication. He is interrupted by Gale, and soon engages in a gunfight with the police, during which his arm is trapped in a sliding door. When the police pry the door open, they mysteriously find android Glenn's arm left behind, which was apparently torn off while escaping.

Meanwhile, the real Glenn is locked in a cell with the real Dornheimer. Lisa brings Glenn his "lucky coin," which contains a length of wire that can be used to cut through the cell's bars. She is then dragged away by two android lab assistants. As he saws the bars, the real Dornheimer tells him that he can destroy the androids by zapping their heads with the lab's "pulse laser beam."

When Kolos refuses to turn Lisa into an android, android Dornheimer proclaims himself head of the android "master race" and has Kolos chained to a wall by the half-dozen android Thors it takes to overpower him, then begins the process of duplicating Lisa. However, android Glenn returns, interrupting the duplication. Still loyal to Kolos, android Glenn refuses to accept android Dornheimer as his master. They fight, destroying each other. The real Glenn uses the pulsed laser beam to destroy the remaining androids as Kolos breaks free of his chains.

After the Thor androids have been destroyed, Kolos gently places the unconscious Lisa on a sofa. Her eyelids flutter open. She touches a tear on her cheek and smiles.

Kolos later says that his mission has failed and, sadly, he has learned that he too is an android. He teletransports back aboard the spaceship, presumably to meet his doom at the hands of the Intergalactic Council.

== Cast ==
- George Nader as Glenn Martin
- Barbara Nichols as Gale Wilson
- George Macready as Prof. Vaughan Dornheimer
- Dolores Faith as Lisa Dornheimer
- Hugh Beaumont as Austin Welles
- Richard Arlen as NIA Director
- Richard Kiel as Dr. Kolos
- John Indrisano as Thor
- Ted Durant as Leader of the Intergalactic Council (voice only)
- Tommy Leonetti as Reporter
- Lori Lyons as Miss Hart
- Margaret Teele as Blonde Lab Assistant (credited as Margot Teele)
- Alean "Bambi" Hamilton as Brunette Lab Assistant (credited as Aleane "Bambi" Hamilton)
- Walter Abel as Dr. Munson (uncredited)

Additional cast: Lonnie Sattin; Melville Ruick (credited as Mel Ruick); Walter Maslow; Larry Barton; Kim Satana; Benito Prezia; John Dasten (credited as John Daston); Richard Schuyler; William White (credited as Bill Hampton); Andrew Johnson.

== Production ==
Interior shots for The Human Duplicators were filmed at Producers Studio in Hollywood. Exterior locations were Bronson Canyon in Griffith Park in Los Angeles and a school located at 5210 Clinton Street, which was used as the Space Research Corp. building where the scientists in the film worked. The exact dates of filming are unavailable, but Hugo Grimaldi Productions copyrighted the film on October 21, 1964.

In The Overlook Film Encyclopedia: Science Fiction, British film scholar Phil Hardy lists the movie as an American-Italian co-production made by Woolner Brothers and Independenti Regionali. It was one of two such co-productions directed by Grimaldi and released in 1965, the other being its companion film Mutiny in Outer Space.

Why Richard Kiel's name was not included on the movie poster remains a mystery, although the packaging of a VHS tape of unknown date identifies the film's stars as "Richard 'Jaws' Kiel and Hugh 'Ward Cleaver' Beaumont." The film was Beaumont's final picture before retiring from acting.

== Release ==
The Human Duplicators was the color first feature on a double bill with the black-and-white Mutiny in Outer Space.

The film was released in the US on 3 March 1965 and at an unspecified date the same year in Canada. It opened in Mexico on 14 December 1967 as Humanoides asesinos ("Humanoids, murderers"). A day later in West Germany, where Nader was well known for playing "tough FBI agent Jerry Cotton in eight highly successful but rubbishy crime thrillers" it premiered as FBI jagt Phantom ("FBI hunts Phantom"). The movie was released to theaters in Italy as Agente Spaziale K-1 ("Space Agent K-1") and in France as Les Créatures de Kolos ("The Creatures of Kolos"). In Belgium it was shown under both the French title and the Dutch title Schepsels van Kolos ("Creatures of Kolos"). The film was also released theatrically in Brazil, Greece, and Spain. In France, the video version's title was Kolos, l'agent cosmique ("Kolos, the Cosmic Agent"). One of the titles used for a VHS of the movie in the US was Jaws of the Alien. Kiel appeared as the character Jaws in The Spy Who Loved Me (1977) and Moonraker (1979).

The movie was theatrically released in the US by Woolner Brothers Pictures Inc., by International Film Distributors in Canada and by Regal Films International in the UK. Distribution in the US switched to Allied Artists in 1966 and 40 years later, in 2006, the American company Better Television Distribution had acquired the world-wide TV syndication rights. For personal home viewing, VHS tapes of The Human Duplicators were released in the 1980s by Joy Home Video in West Germany and at unknown dates by International Video Entertainment, ThrillerVideo, and Star Classics Video in the US. The Star Classics VHS release is called Jaws of the Alien.

== Reception ==
The Human Duplicators has not received particularly good reviews from critics over the years. "Whit" reviewed the film for the 19 May 1965 issue of Variety and called it "an okay entry in its field." He wrote that there was little new in the plot, but that it "generates enough interest to pass in minor situations" and has "exploitation value" for theater owners. "Whit" was somewhat complimentary about the production crew, noting that "Don Wolf's editing is fairly fast."

British film scholar Phil Hardy calls the movie a "confused and over-ambitious offering from Grimaldi." He says that The Human Duplicators "marks the beginnings of a return to the technical gimmickry of the 1930s."

British critic Steven Puchalski refers to the film as a "colourful dose of swill" with a "silly plot and comical goofiness going for it." He makes specific mention of the special effects, sarcastically noting that "The highly technical duplication process involves the victims standing in a circular cage while red and blue lights flash at them," after which "they sit under clear plastic hair dryers until their brains harden." He adds that for unknown reasons the androids have heads made of plaster, "so whenever they're knocked on the noggin, their skulls crack open and Erector Set pieces tumble out. Oops! Design flaw, indeed ...."

Kiel himself seems to have had mixed feelings about the film. He said in an interview with American film scholar Tom Weaver that the film "was a big hit in Chicago," where it played "in like 27 theaters" simultaneously. Kiel made personal appearances at theaters that were showing the movie in Chicago and said that they were so successful that he was asked to do the same in Toronto. But he told interviewer Maggie Howard in 2009 that "The way the director wanted me to act—kind of robotic—didn't come off as well as I would have liked."

== In popular culture ==
The Human Duplicators was shown in season 3, episode 6 of Elvira's Movie Macabre, which first aired on 5 August 1984. The film was later featured in episode #420 of Mystery Science Theater 3000, originally telecast on 26 December 1992.

== See also ==
- List of American films of 1965
