= Caged Desires =

1970 film

- Directed by: Donald A. Davis
- Written by: Barbara Peeters; Bryon Predika
- Starring: Barbara Peeters
- Music by: Chet More; Jim More
- Production company: Hollywood Cinema Associates
- Release date: 1970
- Running time: 75 minutes
- Country: United States
- Language: English

Caged Desires is a 1970 exploitation film, the first writing credit for filmmaker Barbara Peeters, and directed by frequent Ed Wood collaborator Donald A. Davis. It is a women-in-prison drama dealing with a power battle between long-term inmates over their newest cellmate.

== Synopsis ==
Sixteen-year-old Maggie is imprisoned for performing an illegal (and fatal) abortion on a girlfriend. While incarcerated, she becomes the subject of hostile advances from two rival cellmates, Brucie and Cat, and eventually finds love with Angel, a previous target of the predatory women.

== Cast ==
- Barbara Peeters
- Connie Barney
- Susan Francis
- Lu Tomeny
- Fern Holbrook
- Victoria Carbe
- Thareen Auroraa
- Buzz Hinkley
- Willa Arste
- Linda Jeanne

== Release ==
Caged Desires was produced by Hollywood Cinema Associates. According to the film's co-writer, Barbara Peeters, the film was shot in about 1967, even though it was not released until 1970. The film bore an X rating (possibly self-imposed) upon its initial release.

The film's publicity material read: "The management believes that you as an adult are entitled to satisfy your intellectual and emotional needs by viewing this film. We also believe in free choice. Accordingly, if you believe you are likely to be shocked or offended by this film, we will gladly refund your money if you appear at the box-office with the stub of your ticket within the next three minutes."

== See also ==
- List of American films of 1970
