= The Dark Side of Tomorrow =

The Dark Side of Tomorrow Just the Two Of Us
- Video cover
- Directed by: Barbara Peeters; Jack Deerson
- Written by: David Novik; Barbara Peeters
- Produced by: David Novik
- Starring: Elisabeth Plumb; Alisa Courtney; John Aprea
- Cinematography: Jacques Deerson
- Edited by: Richard Weber
- Music by: Jerry Wright
- Production company: Boxoffice International Pictures
- Distributed by: Able Films
- Release date: July 1970
- Running time: 74 minutes
- Country: United States
- Language: English

The Dark Side of Tomorrow is a 1970 American exploitation film directed by Barbara Peeters and Jack Deerson. It was written by David Novik and Peeters, and stars Elisabeth Plumb, Alisa Courtney and John Aprea.

It was re-released in 1975 as Just the Two of Us. (Note: There are advertisements for the movie being shown in 1973 and 1974 under the title of Just the Two Of Us.)

== Plot ==
The film follows two bored Los Angeles housewives, Adria and Denise, living in a housing development called Rockpointe who begin an affair while their husbands are away on government business. When the two start fighting, Denise enters into a relationship with a woman fashion designer, while Adria takes an unemployed actor as her lover. Adria's husband then returns home unexpectedly catching her and the actor in bed, and beats them up, announcing their marriage is over. Now that Adria is totally free of her husband, the film ends with her returning to her former relationship with Denise.

== Cast ==
- Elisabeth Plumb
- Alisa Courtney
- John Aprea
- Wayne Want
- Marland Proctor
- Luan Roberts
- Elizabeth Knowels
- Jamie Cooper
- Sally Fadem
- Linda Hendelman
- Vince Romano
- Laura Patton
- Geretta Jean Taylorr
- Russ Milburn
- Lynne Youngreen

== Production ==
The film was financed by an Israeli investor who wanted an X-rated sex film. Director Barbara Peeters changed the storyline to center around a lesbian relationship. She feels the fact it was from a female director was significant: "If you are going to involve yourself in subjects that heretofore have been taboo, the first moves in that direction should be as close to reality as possible."

== Reception ==
Author Maya Montañez Smukler said that when the movie was released, it "received poor reviews." She quoted a review in Variety Magazine as saying, the film is a "low-budget indie melodrama about loneliness and lesbianism ... that tries hard to be sensitive and in good taste, not successfully enough to make it commercially as art but just enough to take it out of the sexploitation class."

Emmett Weaver wrote in the Birmingham Post-Herald that the film is a "study of lesbianism, a subject which should particularly shock any adult movie fan these days since it is dealt with quite frequently on the screen." William Collins of The Philadelphia Inquirer called the film a "lesbian soap opera," writing that "[Denise and Adria] look as happy as any couple photographed on horseback against the setting sun."

In their review of the film, Psychotronic Video wrote: "Characters talk a lot and the sex scenes are very brief and intercut with other scenes. Some of the soft rock songs by a band (with female backup singers) that plays at a beach pot party are really good."

== See also ==
- List of American films of 1970
- List of LGBTQ-related films of 1970
