= Teenage Doll =

1957 film by Roger Corman

- Theatrical release poster
- Directed by: Roger Corman
- Written by: Charles B. Griffith
- Produced by: Roger Corman executive Bernard Woolner associate Lawrence Woolner
- Starring: June Kenney; John Brinkley; Fay Spain
- Cinematography: Floyd Crosby
- Music by: Walter Greene
- Production company: Woolner Brothers
- Distributed by: Allied Artists
- Release date: September 18, 1957
- Running time: 71 minutes
- Country: United States
- Language: English

Teenage Doll is a 1957 film noir directed by Roger Corman, starring June Kenney and John Brinkley. It was financed by Lawrence Woolner, who had previously made Swamp Women with Corman. One writer called it Corman's "most impressive teen flick".

== Plot ==
The Black Widows, a teenage girl gang, find one of their number killed; they suspect Barbara, sometime girlfriend of Eddie Rand, the leader of rival gang the Vandals. As the gangs prepare for a rumble, we glimpse the members' home lives, exaggerating every type of family dysfunction.

The leader of the Black Widows is Hel (Helen) who decides to offer Rand money to turn Barbara over to them. The gang need to raise money. Squirrel/Eva, takes money from the cash register of her parents' restaurant. Lorrie takes money sent by her father to support her impoverished younger sister. May gets money off her older sister, Janet, who is dating her boss. Hel finds her father cheating on her mother.

Barbara is the daughter of a policeman but doesn't tell her father what happened. Detective Dunston starts an investigation into the girl's death.

The Black Widows gather money then go looking for Barbara. She escapes to the Vandals' clubhouse. Rand agrees to help her.

The Vandals prepare for battle so the Black Widows call in their male gang, the Tarantulas. The rumble begins, and Barbara surrenders to the police as they arrive. Bett and Squirrel decide to leave the gang and also surrender to the police.

== Cast ==
- June Kenney as Barbara Bonney
- Fay Spain as Helen
- John Brinkley as Eddie Rand
- Colette Jackson as May
- Barbara Wilson as Betty Herne
- Ziva Rodan as Squirrel, also known as Eva
- Sandy Smith as Lorrie
- Barboura Morris as Janet
- Richard Devon as Det. Dunston
- Jay Sayer as Wally
- Richard Cutting as Phil Kern
- Dorothy Neumann as Estelle Bonney
- Ed Nelson as Police Officer 'Dutch' / Blind Man
- Bruno VeSota as Témoin
- Abby Dalton (uncredited)

== Production ==
Roger Corman made the film for syndicates of theater owners, the main ones who were the Woolner Brothers, who had financed Corman's Swamp Women.

Charles Griffith was hired to write the script, based on an idea by Bernard Woolner. He said

They wanted a gang picture, as it was the time of the street gangs and juvenile delinquents. I told them I had one called “The Rat Pack” and they said they wanted a girl gang. So I got to work on Teenage Doll, which was Larry Woolner taking the title of [Elia] Kazan’s Baby Doll [1956]. But the Johnson Bureau, or the Hays Office – I forget which was in at the time – rejected the story.

This meant Griffith had to rewrite the script over the weekend:

In the original version, the girls were all stealing weapons or making weapons in order to kill the good girl...I wrote all these jokes in English to be said in Spanish. Roger called up the only Spanish agent around for that and it wound up that they were the best actors in the picture. But they were in the background the entire time! In the foreground, this Mexican girl makes a potato grenade. She sticks a potato peeler in one end for a handle and then a double-edge razor-blade all around the potato so she could just flip the handle and the grenade would hit somebody...Another girl stole her father’s pistol from his holster and, while she’s stealing it from his bed, the phone rings and the father has a conversation on the phone without opening his eyes and hangs up again. But the Hays office made me change these things so that they were stealing these weapons to sell for money to get a lawyer to attack the girls in some legal way. I mean really obnoxious and really stupid. It all had to be redone overnight.

Filming started on February 28, 1957. Fay Spain's casting was announced in March. Barbara Wilson was cast after Roger Corman saw her in The Man Who Turned to Stone. Barbara would later say that Corman was the most professional and work-oriented director she ever worked with.

The person next door to the filming site for exterior scenes turned on her sprinklers hoping to force Corman to pay to turn them off. Her gambit was not successful.

== Reception ==
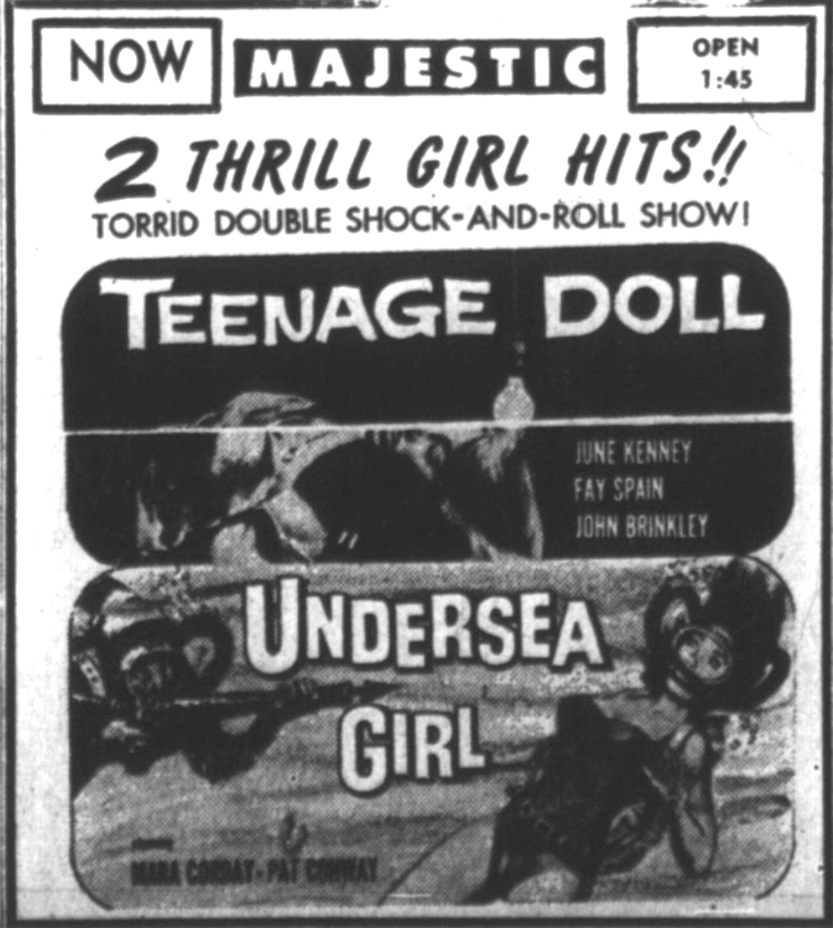
Advertisement from 1957 for Teenage Doll and co-feature, Undersea Girl

Variety said the film's "Unremitting and unconvincing downbeat tenor, clumsily executed, deadens b.o. chances for any audience outside of sex-and-sadism fanciers. Characters in Charles B. Griffith screenplay talk a stylized jargon mainly derivative of other pix of this genre; engage In continual brutality and violence; and their motivations, delinquent or otherwise, bears only the, slightest resemblance of those' human beings." Writing in DVD Savant, film critic Glenn Erickson described the movie as a "rushed, cheap picture" that "sags under the weight of painfully neutered euphemisms like, "I don't give a flying flip," and "I was weaned on a .38!", and featuring "performances [that] are downright embarrassing."

== See also ==
- List of American films of 1957
- List of hood films
