= One of Our Spies Is Missing =

- Original British film poster
- Directed by: E. Darrell Hallenbeck
- Written by: Howard Rodman
- Story by: Henry Slesar
- Based on: The Bridge of Lions; 1963 novel by Henry Slesar
- Starring: Robert Vaughn; David McCallum; Vera Miles; Maurice Evans; Leo G. Carroll
- Cinematography: Fred J. Koenekamp
- Edited by: Henry Berman; William B. Gulick
- Music by: Gerald Fried
- Production companies: Arena Productions; Metro-Goldwyn-Mayer
- Distributed by: Metro-Goldwyn-Mayer
- Release dates: July 14, 1966 (UK); December 1966 (United States)
- Running time: 91 minutes
- Country: United States
- Language: English

One of Our Spies Is Missing is the 1966 feature-length film version of The Man from U.N.C.L.E.'s second season two-part episode "The Bridge of Lions Affair". The episodes were originally broadcast in the United States on February 4, 1966 and February 11, 1966 on NBC. The film is directed by E. Darrell Hallenbeck and written by Howard Rodman. It, as does the television series, stars Robert Vaughn and David McCallum. It is the fourth such feature film that used as its basis a reedited version of one or more episodes from the series. However, this film, and the episodes it draws from, represents the only instance where a Man from U.N.C.L.E. story is derived from an existing novel: The Bridge of Lions (1963) by Henry Slesar.

== Plot ==
Illya Kuryakin is investigating the theft of cats in the Soho area of London, and Napoleon Solo is on a mission to determine the whereabouts of the famous, suddenly youthful appearing, and now missing 83-year-old biologist Benjamin Lancer. Solo contacts Lancer's daughter Lorelei, a model at the Paris salon of Madame Raine De Sala. De Sala orders her associate Olga and model Do Do to make sure that Lorelei does not speak to Solo.

De Sala then visits Sir Norman Swickert, an old statesman she knew and admired as a child, and brings along with her Dr. Alexander Gritsky – a colleague of Dr. Lancer. Swickert complains of being too old to have political power anymore, and De Sala reveals her desire for such power as he once had, her resentment of not having it available to her since she is a woman, and her ability to make him a younger man with Gritsky's help.

Meanwhile, Solo's efforts to contact Lorelei result in Do Do and Olga acting together to kill her rather than have her speak to Solo. Solo discovers this when he is lured to Lorelei's apartment and, after a fight with Do Do, discovers both Lorelei's body and a note to Lorelei that she could contact her father through Philip Bainbridge. Solo attempts to contact Bainbridge in London (meeting Swickert's full-time nurse Joanna Sweet in the process), but Swickert is speaking with him first. Swickert becomes convinced that the middle-aged Bainbridge is actually the elderly Lancer made young again via a medical process. Olga has followed Solo and, in attempting to kill him, accidentally kills Bainbridge/Lancer. A chase and fight ensues with the result being the escape of Olga and Do Do's death.

Having seen Swickert with Lancer, Solo visits Swickert at his country estate and questions him about Bainbridge and Lancer. Swickert refuses to say much beyond that Lancer was a member of the Bridge of Lions club, a private chess club that Swickert founded to build a bridge among the great men of many nations to allow them freedom to communicate under all circumstances – thereby reducing the chances of cataclysms like World War I.

Shortly after leaving Swickert's home, Solo's car crashes as a result of sabotage – implied to be the work of Olga. Solo is found by THRUSH agent Jordin, who advises U.N.C.L.E. of Solo's predicament and location. Kuryakin, still investigating the missing cats, tracks one of them to a laboratory. He finds the cat de-aged to a kitten and the man said to have been capturing the cats, Corvy, dead by a hat pin. Solo (none the worse for his auto accident) arrives as well and, after comparing notes the two men reach the conclusion that the cats, having a similar nervous system to humans, are being experimented upon with the de-aging process developed by Lancer and Gritsky. Kuryakin finds that hat associated with the pin and it turns out to be from Madame Raine De Sala's salon. From this point on they collaborate on their assignments.

Solo and Kuryakin next break into Swickert's home and are captured by Swickert's guard and Olga. Tossed into a wine press with the press descending, they are left for dead. They nonetheless figure out how to brace the press and are eventually released by Jordin after everyone else leaves the estate. After a brief interrogation by Jordin, the U.N.C.L.E. agents overpower him and, while he escapes, are again free.

In very short order, Swickert is de-aged and regains his stature as a man of power. Solo and Kuryakin confront him and demand the secret of rejuvenation. Jordin, listening covertly to their conversation, captures Gritsky and blackmails De Sala: he will only provide continued curative treatments to Swickert if De Sala uses her influence to make Swickert do THRUSH's bidding in political matters. Solo finds out and is captured again. Because of his past association with Swickert, Alexander Waverly travels to England to speak to him, but is also captured by Jordin and placed with Solo.

Swickert, having taken another treatment with Gritsky and learning of THRUSH's plans for him, decides that Gritsky and his secret must die to keep anyone else from suffering his fate. Jordin saves Gritsky, but Swickert goes on to give a political speech wherein he explains enough of THRUSH's plans that Jordin draws a gun. De Sala jumps in front of Swickert to protect him and ends up shot and killed in his stead.

Solo, having escaped with Waverly via an incidiary rope in Waverly's tie, meets up with Kuryakin to investigate Gritsky's laboratory. They find Gritsky has taken Swickert's worries to heart and committed suicide by de-aging rapidly to a child. Jordin comes in, takes Gritsky's notes, and destroys the de-aging machine so no one else can have it. But Gritsky has booby-trapped the machine and Jordin is killed. Solo and Kuryakin return to New York, and since the secret of the de-aging process is written in code, it appears to be lost to science for a very long time.

== Cast ==
- Robert Vaughn as Napoleon Solo
- David McCallum as Illya Kuryakin
- Leo G. Carroll as Alexander Waverly
- Maurice Evans as Sir Norman Swickert
- Yvonne Craig as Wanda
- Vera Miles as Madame Raine De Sala
- Ann Elder as Joanna Sweet
- Bernard Fox as Jordin
- Harry Davis as Prof. Alexander Gritsky
- Monica Keating as Olga
- Dolores Faith as Lorelei Lancer
- Ahna Capri as Do Do
- Cal Bolder as Fleeton
- James Doohan as Benjamin Lancer/Phillip Bainbridge
- Ollie O'Toole as Corvy
- Anthony Eustrel as Steward
- Richard Peel as Cat Man
- Barry Bernard as Pet Shop Owner
- Robert Easton as Mr. Bentley

== Changes from episode ==
The film took the second season two-part The Man from U.N.C.L.E. episode "The Bridge of Lions Affair" and, in addition to editing the length to accommodate the running time of the film by cutting and rearranging some scenes, made several major changes to the episodes. First, Leigh Chapman, who played the character of an U.N.C.L.E. communications technician named Wanda, was replaced by Yvonne Craig. Yvonne Craig had played Alexander Waverly (Leo G. Carroll)’s niece Maude Waverly in the prior U.N.C.L.E. film One Spy Too Many, but no reference was made to that character in this movie. The character remained named Wanda and, other than the replacement of the actress, the role was essentially unchanged from the television episode. Second, the character Do Do (Ahna Capri) was introduced as a model who was all too willing to perform Madame Raine De Sala (Vera Miles)’s dirty work. Also new were scenes dealing with the death of Lorelei Lancer (Dolores Faith); whereas in the episodes she was strangled off screen, in the film her dead body is shown staring open-eyed from the bottom of a tub filled with water. The television episode had also made clear that Jordin (Bernard Fox) was investigating Benjamin Lancer (James Doohan) as well but the movie did not include those scenes, though, making Jordin's sudden appearance and his motives for helping Napoleon Solo (Robert Vaughn) as an enemy agent unclear. The film had a new score composed for it by Gerald Fried, because "The Bridge of Lions Affair" had been tracked with music from other episodes.

== Release ==
One of Our Spies Is Missing is the 1966 feature-length film version of The Man from U.N.C.L.E.'s second season two-part episode "The Bridge of Lions Affair". The episodes were originally broadcast in the United States on February 4, 1966 and February 11, 1966 on NBC.

=== Home media ===
The film was released on DVD in a collection package by Warner Archive Collection on November 2, 2011.

== See also ==
- List of American films of 1966
