= Dolores Faith =

American actress (1941–1990)

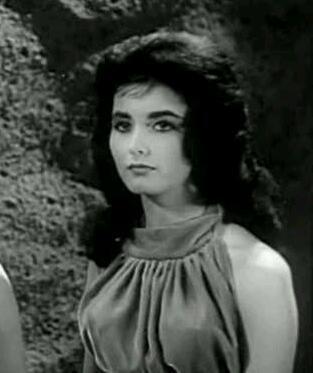
- Faith in 1961
- Born: Dolores Faith Hedges; July 15, 1941; Cleveland, Ohio, U.S.
- Died: February 25, 1990 (aged 48); Miami, Florida, U.S.
- Education: Alexander Hamilton High School
- Occupation: Actress
- Years active: 1961–1972
- Known for: The Phantom Planet; The Human Duplicators; Mutiny in Outer Space
- Spouse: James Robert Neal (m. 1972; div. 1977)

Dolores Faith Hedges (July 15, 1941 – February 25, 1990), better known as Dolores Faith, was an American actress. She is best remembered as the mute girl Zetha in the 1961 science fiction film The Phantom Planet. Her brief career came to an end when she married millionaire James Robert Neal.

== Early life ==
Dolores Faith Hedges was born in Cleveland, Ohio, on July 15, 1941. She was of Hungarian and Italian descent. She lost her hearing at age four from an accident, but it later returned by age eight. A natural blonde, she dyed her hair black to better match her olive skin. She graduated from Alexander Hamilton High School in Los Angeles, California, in 1958. She was a member of the "Sock 'n' Buskin" drama club.

== Career ==
Faith began as a model and as a dance instructor before acting. In 1959, she was given a screen test by Warner Bros. They chose not to hire her because of her resemblance to both Elizabeth Taylor and Grace Kelly. She became a Hollywood Deb Star in 1962 and was featured in Life magazine in 1963.

Faith probably is best remembered for three low-budget science fiction films: The Phantom Planet, The Human Duplicators and Mutiny in Outer Space. She also appeared in dramas. In V.D., she was a young vixen who gets gonorrhea from the "hero" (who got it from a prostitute). In Wild Harvest, she plays the mistress of a ruthless, womanizing vineyard manager whom she sides against after getting fed up. She was also in Shell Shock, a war drama.

On television, she appeared in episodes of Ripcord, Have Gun - Will Travel and The Man from U.N.C.L.E., a two-part episode released theatrically as One of Our Spies Is Missing.

== Personal life ==
Faith met Texas millionaire and Maxwell House heir James Robert Neal (1921-2006) and the couple became a regular sight at various public events. In November 1972, they were married in Las Vegas after a long courtship, and she retired from acting. They divorced in April 1977. They remarried years later and remained married until her death.

== Death ==
Faith died by suicide in Miami, Florida, on February 25, 1990, at the age of 48. In his book Glamour Girls of Sixties Hollywood: Seventy-Five Profiles, author Tom Lisanti falsely claimed that Faith was alive and living in Florida as of 2006.

== Filmography ==
Year	Title	Role	Notes
1961	All in a Night's Work	Girl Holding Hands	Uncredited
1961	The Phantom Planet	Zetha	
1961	Love in a Goldfish Bowl	Pie Throwing Girl	Uncredited
1961	V.D.	Kathy Durham	
1962	Wild Harvest	Rose	
1963	Ripcord	Tanya Rovag	Episode: "The Last Chapter"
1963	Have Gun - Will Travel	The Rani	Episode: "The Caravan"
1964	Shell Shock	American Girl	
1965	Honeymoon Hotel	Mrs. Fendelmeyer	Uncredited
1965	Mutiny in Outer Space	Faith Montaine	
1965	The Human Duplicators	Lisa Dornheimer	
1965	House of the Black Death	Valerie Desard	
1966	The Man from U.N.C.L.E.	Lorelei Lancer	Episode: "The Bridge of Lions Affair, Part 1"
1966	One of Our Spies Is Missing	Lorelei Lancer	
1966	That Tennessee Beat	Belle Scofield	
1972	Summer of '63	Kathy	Uncredited; Short film, uses footage from 1961 V.D. film
