= Dean Fredericks =

American actor (1924–1999)

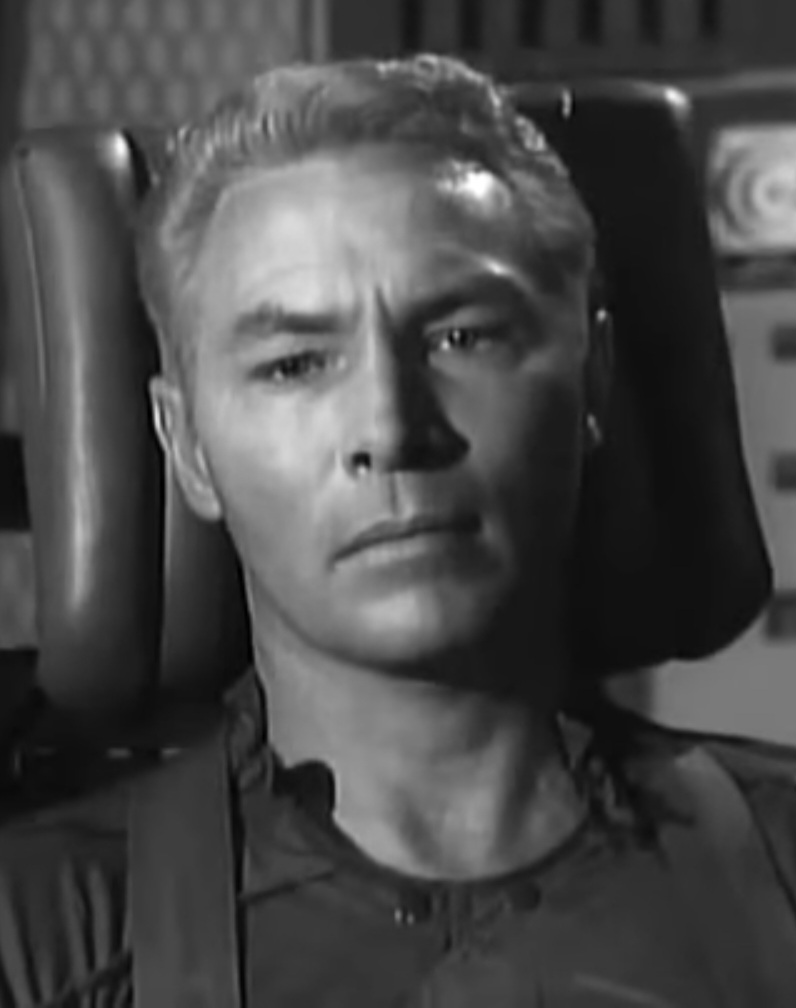
- Fredericks in The Phantom Planet (1961)
- Born: Frederick Joseph Foote; January 21, 1924; Los Angeles, California, U.S.
- Died: June 30, 1999 (aged 75); Los Angeles, California, U.S.
- Occupation: Actor
- Years active: 1952–1965
- Spouse: Myda Fredericks

Frederick Joseph Foote (January 21, 1924 – June 30, 1999) was an American film and television actor. He was best known for playing the title role in the television series Steve Canyon.

== Early life ==
Fredericks was born in Los Angeles, California, He served in the armed forces during World War II. For his military service, he received the Purple Heart. He began his acting career in 1952 with an appearance in the television series The Living Bible. He continued appearing on film and television in the mid-1950s under the stage name Norman Fredric.

== Career ==
In 1955, Fredericks starred in the television series Jungle Jim in the role of Kaseem. In 1958, he starred in the title role of the short-lived television series Steve Canyon, changing his name to Dean Fredericks. He also starred in the role of Captain Frank Chapman in the 1961 film The Phantom Planet. He retired from acting in 1965.

== Death ==
Fredericks died on June 30, 1999, of cancer in Los Angeles, California, at the age of 75.
