= Richard Kiel =

American actor (1939–2014)

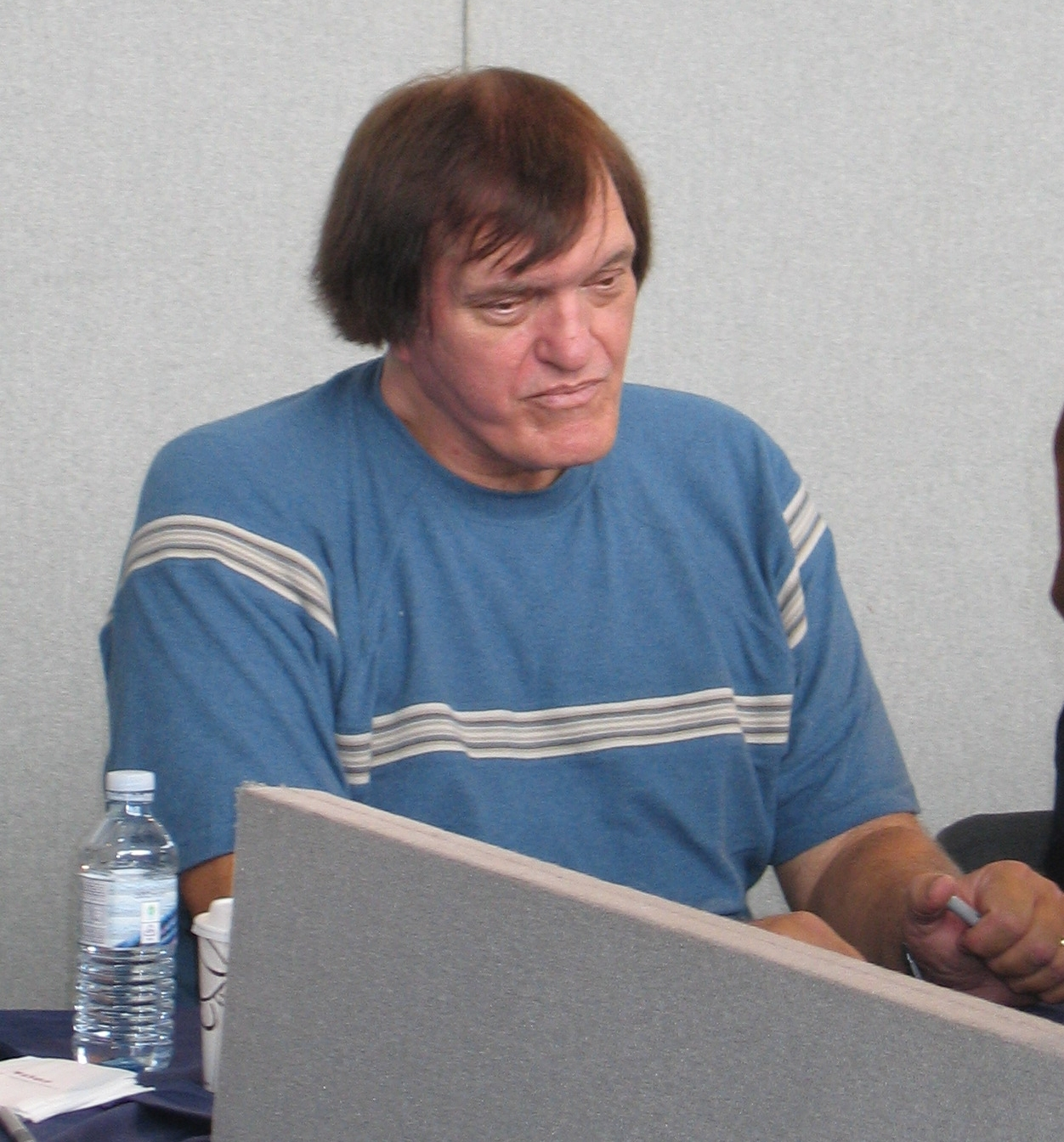
- Kiel in 2004
- Born: Richard Dawson Kiel; September 13, 1939; Detroit, Michigan, US
- Died: September 10, 2014 (aged 74); Fresno, California, US
- Resting place: Belmont Memorial Park, Fresno, California, US
- Occupation: Actor
- Years active: 1958–2012
- Notable credits: Jaws in the James Bond films Mr. Larson in Happy Gilmore
- Height: 7 ft 1.5 in (217 cm)
- Spouses: Faye Daniels (m. 1960; div. 1973) Diane Rogers (m. 1974)
- Children: 4

Richard Dawson Kiel (September 13, 1939 – September 10, 2014) was an American actor. Standing 7 feet 1.5 inches (2.17 m) tall, he was notable for portraying Jaws in The Spy Who Loved Me (1977) and Moonraker (1979), and Mr. Larson in Happy Gilmore (1996). Other notable films include The Longest Yard (1974), Silver Streak (1976), Force 10 from Navarone (1978), Cannonball Run II (1984), Pale Rider (1985) and Tangled (2010). On television, he portrayed the giant alien in the highly regarded 1962 Twilight Zone episode "To Serve Man".

== Early life, family and education ==
Kiel was born on September 13, 1939, in Detroit, Michigan, the son of George Albert Kiel (1905–1958) and Mary May Kiel (née Mobbs, 1915–2008). His extraordinary height was the result of a condition caused by an excess of human growth hormone. When he was nine years old, his family moved to the Greater Los Angeles area, where Kiel graduated from Baldwin Park High School.

== Career ==
Kiel's career included films, television and co-authoring books. However, before this, Kiel worked in several jobs, including as a door-to-door vacuum cleaner salesman, a nightclub bouncer, and a cemetery plot salesman. From 1963 to 1965, Kiel worked as a night school mathematics instructor at the William B. Ogden Radio Operational School in Burbank, California.

=== Television ===
Kiel appeared in many television shows throughout the 1960s to the 1980s, including the 1962 Twilight Zone episode "To Serve Man", where he portrayed the 9-foot-tall (2.7 m) Kanamit aliens. Other TV series he appeared in included Laramie ("Street of Hate", 1961), I Dream of Jeannie, The Rifleman ("The Decision", 1961), Honey West, Gilligan's Island, The Monkees, Daniel Boone, Emergency!, Starsky & Hutch, Land of the Lost, Simon & Simon, Kolchak: The Night Stalker and The Fall Guy.

Due to his size, Kiel was often cast in villainous roles. He appeared as Voltaire, the towering mute-but-lethal assistant to Dr. Miguelito Loveless in three first-season episodes of The Wild Wild West. In the Man from U.N.C.L.E. episode "The Vulcan Affair" (1964), Kiel appeared as a guard in Vulcan's plant and portrayed Merry in "The Hong Kong Shilling Affair". In 1967, he played a monster in The Monkees episode "I Was a Teenage Monster".

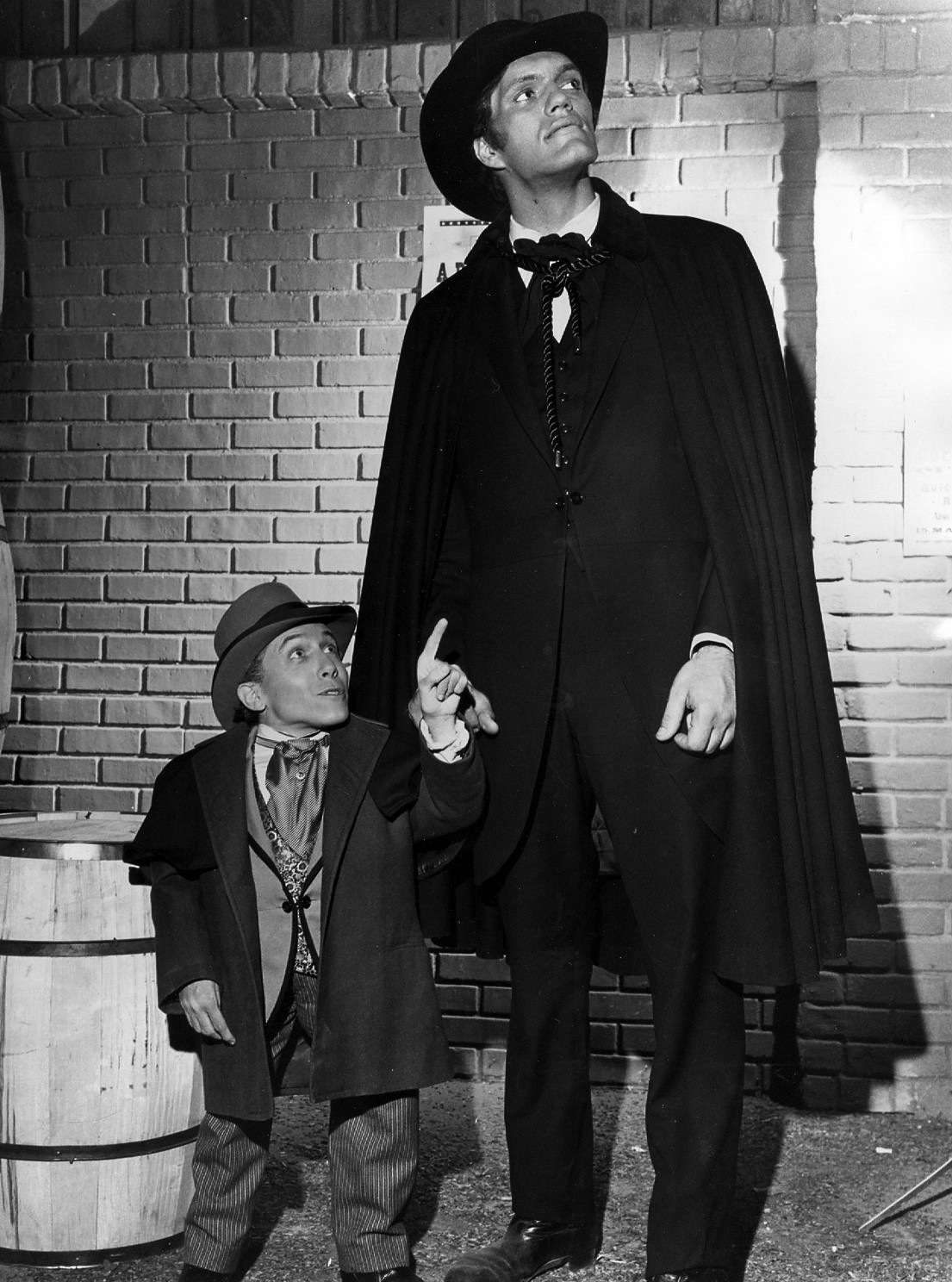
Michael Dunn and Kiel on the set of The Wild Wild West

In 1968 he appeared in an episode of The Wild Wild West titled "The Night of the Simian Terror", as Dimas, the outcast son of a wealthy family, banished because of birth defects that distorted his body and apparently affected his mind.

In 1977, Kiel and Arnold Schwarzenegger were both considered for playing the Hulk in the American television series The Incredible Hulk. After Schwarzenegger was turned down due to his height, Kiel started filming the pilot. However, the producers quickly decided they wanted a more muscular Hulk rather than the towering Kiel, so he was dismissed. Kiel later said he did not mind losing the part, because he could only see out of one eye. He reacted badly to the contact lenses he had to wear for the role. He also found the green makeup unpleasant and difficult to remove. His scenes were then reshot with Lou Ferrigno.

=== Film ===
Kiel broke into films in the early 1960s with Eegah (1962), which was later featured on Elvira's Movie Macabre and Mystery Science Theater 3000, as were The Phantom Planet (1961) and The Human Duplicators (1965). He also produced, co-wrote and starred in The Giant of Thunder Mountain (1991). He also had a brief non-speaking appearance leaving a gym in the Jerry Lewis movie The Nutty Professor (1963).

Kiel has played a metal-toothed villain in a few films. First, he played Reace in the comedy-thriller film Silver Streak (1976). The James Bond film producers spotted Kiel in Barbary Coast, and thought he was ideal for the role of Jaws in The Spy Who Loved Me (1977), then the next Bond film, Moonraker (1979). Jaws is one of the few Bond villains to appear in two Bond films. Kiel's scenes were often shot with his mouth closed or briefly showing his dangerous smile; Kiel explained his metal prosthetic mouthpiece was extremely painful to wear and could only be used for a few minutes at a time. The Spy Who Loved Me was the first of three films that Kiel appeared in alongside Barbara Bach in the late 1970s. The other two were Force 10 from Navarone and The Humanoid. Kiel reprised his role of Jaws in the video game James Bond 007: Everything or Nothing, supplying his voice and likeness.

He used his size for comedic effect, as the "best-dressed giant" Mr. Eddie, in So Fine (1981) starring Ryan O'Neal. Kiel had a supporting role in the Western film Pale Rider (1985). Acting as the main antagonist's henchman, he redeems his character's status by saving the hero from a gunshot to the back.

As Mr. Larson in Happy Gilmore (1996), Kiel exchanges several one-liners with both Adam Sandler's Happy and Christopher McDonald's Shooter McGavin. Kiel took a quieter profile after Happy Gilmore's release, becoming semi-retired, but he recorded a role for the Disney film Tangled (2010): Vlad, a surprisingly softhearted thug who collects ceramic unicorns.

== Other work ==
With Pamela Wallace, Kiel co-authored Kentucky Lion (2007), a biography of the abolitionist Cassius Marcellus Clay. In 2002, Kiel published his autobiography, Making It Big in the Movies.

== Personal life and death ==
Kiel's first marriage was to Faye Daniels in 1960. They divorced in 1973. One year later, he married Diane Rogers. Rogers stated that, despite being 5 ft 1 in (1.55 m), she and her husband "[saw] eye to eye on so many things." Their marriage lasted for 40 years, until Kiel's death. Kiel and Rogers had four children and nine grandchildren.

Kiel was a born-again Christian, stating on his website that his religious conversion helped him to overcome alcoholism.

On September 10, 2014, Kiel died at St. Agnes Medical Center in Fresno, California, from heart disease, aged 74.

== Filmography ==
=== Features ===
Year	Title	Role	Notes
1957	The D.I.	Ugly Marine	Uncredited
1961	Run of the Hunted	Toland's Assistant	Uncredited
1961	The Phantom Planet	The Solarite	
1962	Eegah	Eegah	
1963	House of the Damned	Giant	
1963	The Nutty Professor	Bodybuilder #1	Uncredited
1963	Lassie's Great Adventure	Chinook Pete	
1963	30 Minutes at Gunsight	Unknown	TV short
1964	Roustabout	Strong Man	Uncredited
1964	The Nasty Rabbit	Ranch Foreman	Uncredited
1965	Two on a Guillotine	Tall Man At Funeral	Uncredited
1965	The Human Duplicators	Dr. Kolos	
1965	Brainstorm	Psychiatric Hospital Patient	Uncredited
1966	The Las Vegas Hillbillys	"Moose"	
1967	A Man Called Dagger	Otto	
1968	Now You See It, Now You Don't	Nori	TV movie
1968	Skidoo	"Beany"	
1970	On a Clear Day You Can See Forever	The Blacksmith	Uncredited
1973	Deadhead Miles	Dick "Big Dick"	
1974	The Longest Yard	Samson	
1975	Flash and the Firecat	Tracker	
1976	Gus	Large Man	
1976	Silver Streak	Reace	
1977	The Spy Who Loved Me	Jaws	
1978	Wu zi tian shi	"Steel Hand"	
1978	Force 10 from Navarone	Captain Drazak	
1978	They Went That-A-Way & That-A-Way	Duke	
1979	The Humanoid	Golob	
1979	Moonraker	Jaws	Nominated – Saturn Award for Best Supporting Actor
1981	So Fine	Eddie	
1983	Hysterical	Captain Howdy	
1983	Phoenix	Steel Hand	
1984	Aces Go Places 3	"Big G"	
1984	Cannonball Run II	Arnold / Mitsubishi Driver	
1985	Pale Rider	Club	
1985	Qing bao long hu men	Laszlo	
1989	Think Big	Irving	
1989	The Princess and the Dwarf	Unknown	
1991	The Giant of Thunder Mountain	Eli Weaver	
1996	Happy Gilmore	Mr. Larson	
1999	Inspector Gadget	Famous Big Guy With Silver Teeth	Parody of Jaws. Part of "The Minion Recovery Group"
2009	The Awakened	Jasper	
2010	The Corpse of Albert Cradette	Albert Cradette	
2010	Tangled	Vladimir	Voice (final film role)

=== Television ===
Year	Title	Role	Notes
1958	The Rifleman	Bit Part Bully	
1960	Klondike	Duff Brannigan	Episode: "Bare Knuckles"
1961	Laramie	Rake, Tolan's Helper	Episode: "Run of the Hunted"; uncredited
1961	The Phantom	Mike "Big Mike"	
1961	Thriller	Master Styx	Episode: "Well of Doom"
1961	The Rifleman	Corey Hazlitt's Cousin Carl	Episode: "The Decision"
1962	The Twilight Zone	Kanamit alien	Episode: "To Serve Man"
1963	The Paul Bunyan Show	Paul Bunyan	
1964	The Man from U.N.C.L.E.	Henchman for Mr. Vulcan	Episode: "The Vulcan Affair"; uncredited
1965	The Man from U.N.C.L.E.	Merry	Episode: "The Hong Kong Shilling Affair"
1965	I Dream of Jeannie	Ali	Episode: "My Hero"
1965–1966	The Wild Wild West	Voltaire	Episodes: 1965: "The Night That Terror Stalked the Town", "The Night of the Whirring Death"; 1966: "The Night the Wizard Shook the Earth"
1966	Honey West	Groalgo	Episode: "King of the Mountain"
1966	My Mother the Car	Cracks	Episode: "A Riddler on the Roof"
1966	Gilligan's Island	Ghost	Episode: "Ghost-a-Go-Go"
1967	The Monkees	Monster	Episode: "I Was a Teenage Monster"
1967	The Monroes	Casmir	Episode: "Ghosts of Paradox"
1968	I Spy	Tiny	Episode: "A Few Miles West of Nowhere"
1968	The Wild Wild West	Dimas	Episode: "The Night of the Simian Terror"
1968	It Takes a Thief	Willie Trion	Episode: "The Galloping Skin Game"
1969	Daniel Boone	Le Mouche	Episode: "Benvenuto... Who?"
1970	Disneyland	Luke Brown	Episode: "The Boy Who Stole the Elephant: Part 1 & 2"
1974	Kolchak: The Night Stalker	The Diablero	Episode: "Bad Medicine"
1974	Emergency!	Carlo	Episode: "I'll Fix It"
1974	Kolchak: The Night Stalker	The "Père Malfait"	Episode: "The Spanish Moss Murders"
1975	Switch	Loach	Episode: "Death Heist"
1976	Starsky & Hutch	Iggy	Episode: "Omaha Tiger"
1975–1976	Barbary Coast	"Moose" Moran	14 episodes, 1975–1976
1976	Land of the Lost	Malak	Episodes: "Survival Kit", "Flying Dutchman"
1977	The Hardy Boys/Nancy Drew Mysteries	The Manager	Episode: "The Mystery of the Haunted House"
1977	Young Dan'l Boone	Unknown	Episode: "The Game"
1977	The Incredible Hulk	Hulk	Pilot; uncredited
1980	Match Game PM	Himself, Panelist	Five episodes
1981	The Fall Guy	Animal	Episode: "That's Right, We're Bad"
1983	Simon & Simon	Mark Horton	Episode: "The Skeleton Who Came Out of the Closet"
1988	Out of This World	Norman	Episode: "Go West, Young Mayor"
1989	Superboy	Vlkabok	Episode: "Mr. and Mrs. Superboy"
2000	Bloodhounds Inc.	Mortimer	Episode: "Fangs for the Memories"

=== Video games ===
Year	Title	Role	Notes
1997	GoldenEye 007	Jaws	Uncredited use of likeness
1998	James Bond 007	Jaws	
2000	007: The World Is Not Enough	Jaws	Uncredited use of likeness
2000	007 Racing	Jaws	Archival footage
2004	James Bond 007: Everything or Nothing	Jaws	Credited use of likeness
2010	GoldenEye 007	Jaws	Uncredited use of likeness
2012	007 Legends	Jaws	Uncredited use of likeness
