= Barbara Peeters =

American film director

Barbara Peeters, also known as Barbara Peters, is an American director and screenwriter of television and film. She is best known for her collaborations with producer-director Roger Corman on films such as Summer School Teachers and Humanoids from the Deep, and directing episodes of television shows such as Remington Steele and Falcon Crest.

== Career ==
Peeters broke into the film industry working in makeup, as a script supervisor, and as a production manager.

An Israeli investor wanted an X-rated sex film, enabling Peeters to turn director with Just the Two of Us (originally titled The Dark Side of Tomorrow).

She wrote and directed the 1971 biker Bury Me an Angel. She was one of two female directors working for New World Pictures in the 1970s, the other being Stephanie Rothman. Film writer Gary Morris argued, "her New World work is arguably more subversive than Rothman's." She worked in a variety of capacities for that company, also production managing and second -unit directing. Says Peeters:

We lived like gypsies, sleeping in the hallways when we couldn’t pay rent, sharing a car among five people. I thought I had the best life in the world. I was making movies. What were the other girls I’d graduated high school doing back in Iowa? They were marrying the boy who had the biggest farm.

She had a big hit with Summer School Teachers. Peeters was quoted in 1978 as saying:

I don't like to be dictated to once I start shooting. If you tell me I have to shoot eight pages in a day and its 6 pm, let [sic] me alone. Don't talk to me at midnight until I am done. If I'm going to take the blame, then I want to make the decisions. If I fail, I won't die. I consider real power the point when you're not afraid to fail... I don't know any director who wants to spend his whole life making low-budget exploitation movies, just as nobody wants to spend their whole life in kindergarten. You look forward to graduating to high school.

Peeters formed Big Movie Company with Terry Schwartz, intending to develop projects for female stars. However, Peeters fell ill in 1979 and spent some time out of the industry.

She returned to directing with the 1980 film Humanoids from the Deep, which was taken out of her hands and greatly changed by Roger Corman, including the addition of several rape sequences. Peeters asked for her name to be taken off the film, but this was not done. After this experience, she stopped working for New World and directed TV for the next decade.

In the 1990s, she established her own company, Silver Foxx Films. In 2008, she moved to Oregon and concentrated primarily on making commercials and developing documentaries.

== Selected filmography ==
- The Fabulous Bastard from Chicago (1969) – costume designer
- The Gun Runner (1969) – actor
- Angels Die Hard (1970) – script supervisor
- Caged Desires (1970) – writer, star
- The Dark Side of Tomorrow (1970) – writer, director
- Bury Me an Angel (1972) – writer, director
- Night Call Nurses (1972) – production manager
- The Young Nurses (1973) – art director
- The Student Teachers (1973) – 2nd unit director
- Soul Train (1973–74) (TV series) – production assistant
- Summer School Teachers (1974) – director, writer
- Candy Stripe Nurses (1975) -2nd unit director
- Moving Violation (1976) – 2nd unit director, stunt co-ordinator
- Eat My Dust! (1976) – 2nd unit director
- Starhops (1978) – director, writer
- Humanoids from the Deep (1980) – director
- The Powers of Matthew Star (1982) (TV series) – director
- Matt Houston (1982) (TV series) – director
- Renegades (1983) (TV series) – director
- Remington Steele (1984) (TV series) – director
- Falcon Crest (1984–85) (TV series) – director
- Shadow Chasers (1985) (TV series) – director
