= Swamp Women =

1955 film by Roger Corman

- Theatrical release poster
- Directed by: Roger Corman
- Written by: David Stern
- Produced by: Bernard Woolner
- Starring: Beverly Garland; Carole Mathews; Mike Connors; Marie Windsor; Jil Jarmyn; Susan Cummings
- Cinematography: Frederick E. West
- Edited by: Ronald Sinclair
- Music by: Bill Holman
- Production company: Woolner Brothers Pictures Inc.
- Release date: April 1, 1956
- Running time: 84 minutes
- Country: United States
- Language: English

Swamp Women is a 1956 American adventure film noir crime film directed by Roger Corman. It stars Carole Mathews, Beverly Garland, and Marie Windsor, with Mike Connors and Ed Nelson in small roles.

The film follows undercover police officer Lee Hampton, who infiltrates a band of three female convicts authorities allow to escape from prison. The escape is part of a larger plot to uncover a cache of diamonds hidden deep within the swamps of Louisiana. This film is sometimes also known as Cruel Swamp or Swamp Diamonds.

The film was financed by the Woolner Brothers, who later helped Corman set up New World Pictures.

== Plot ==
Three escaped female convicts, along with an undercover policewoman, Lee Hampton, begin a search for stolen diamonds in the Louisiana swamps. The escape, allowed by the authorities, is part of a larger plan by the authorities to trail the convicts and recover the diamonds. When notified that the stolen diamond cache has been recovered by the undercover officer, they plan to rearrest the women and return the diamonds to their rightful owner. The plan fails to work as designed.

During the inmates' search of the swamp, they steal a boat from a research geologist and his girlfriend, resulting in the girlfriend's death from the attack of indigenous alligators.

After recovery of the diamonds, one of the convicts double-crosses the others, attempting to sneak off with the guns and diamonds, but she is killed by one of the other convicts. The two remaining convicts begin to suspect the undercover cop, and threaten to kill the geologist if she doesn't reveal herself.

A fight ensues between the convicts and the undercover officer, assisted by the geologist, which allows the authorities enough time to show up and regain custody of the two remaining fugitives.

== Cast ==
- Marie Windsor as Josie
- Carole Mathews as Lee
- Beverly Garland as Vera
- Mike Connors as Bob (credited as Touch Connors)
- Jill Jarmyn as Billie
- Susan Cummings as Marie
- Ed Nelson as police sergeant
- Jonathan Haze as Charlie the pickpocket
- Lou Place as Captain J. R. Goodrich

== Production ==
=== Development ===
Corman and his production partner Jim Nicholson were completing a long road trip searching for backers for their movies, often from drive-in theater owners, when they met the Woolner brothers—Lawrence, Bernard and David—who had opened New Orleans' first drive-in theaters. Looking to get into the production business, Corman said, the brothers agreed to help finance Swamp Women for Corman, who returned to Louisiana with his cast and crew for the production.

Larry Woolner's wife Betty said her husband "was crazy about" Corman. Woolner's son Jurt said “A big part of my father’s decision process was whether he could visualize the poster. So you can just imagine a movie called Swamp Women. That laid a very clear exploitation track to follow.”

A former Louisiana governor owned a large plantation, and invited the filmmakers to make a movie there. (The end credits thanks Mayor De Lesseps Morrison and Police Chief John Dayries of New Orleans and Governor Robert Kennon of Louisiana.)

=== Shooting ===
Filming started in October 1955. The film was shot on location in Louisiana near the town of Lacombe, and was shot in either 10 or 22 days, depending on the source.

Jonathan Haze, who worked with Corman a number of times, had a small role in the movie and also worked as a fight co ordinator for the women. He says the Woolner brothers had him arrested and put in prison as a joke, but called them "really good people. They played hard-guy, but deep down they were nice. Barney was always in a hurry, while Larry was much more cool and quiet, and not so much of a character.”

Beverly Garland, who would go on to make several films with Corman, called the movie:

A terrible thing! Roger put us up in this old, abandoned hotel... I mean, it was really abandoned!... I'm surprised that the hotel had running water! I remember that we each had a room with an iron bed. Our first night there, I went to bed, and I heard this tremendous crash! I went screaming into Marie Windsor's room, and there she was with the bed on top of her— the whole bed had collapsed! Well, we started laughing because everything was so awful in this hotel, just incredibly terrible, and we became good friends.

Windsor confirmed this, saying Corman is "such a nice guy. but he's sure hard on you out on the location."

Mike Connors recalled, "the girls in that picture had it much worse than I did. They were playing escaped convicts, and they captured me. They had to trudge through the mud, the swamps, pulling this rowboat, and I was sitting in the rowboat high and dry." However at the end of the film he had to dive into the water which "had snakes and stuff in it, and it was just terrible. But to Roger, it was like [shrugs], 'So you get bit by a snake — big deal!' It was a horrendous experience, I'll tell you — just the worst."

Connors said he had to do scenes near an alligator in the water (it was tied up) and a rattlesnake which crawled over his leg (its mouth was taped). "I had nightmares for weeks after I got back, about that.. .big snake," said Connors.

Ed Nelson, later of Peyton Place fame, was living in New Orleans at the time, working as a floor manager for WDSU, when he heard of the film. "I had the gut feeling that being a part of the Corman group would boost my career," Nelson said. "I was right."

Nelson got himself a job behind the scenes on the movie and eventually was cast as a cop as well. Nelson later said, "I did everything: I was the location manager, I wrestled the alligator. I held it up in the water so that Mike [Touch] Connors could wrestle it. " He added, ""This included bringing the limited supply of hot water to the almost primitive hotel rooms at the Georgian Manor so the performers and crew could bathe. I made hot coffee for the cast and crew, and maintained a cooler of cold Barq's Root Beer, Louisiana's favorite soft drink, when the heat was at its worst."

Wild animals, such as an alligator and a rattlesnake, were hired from Arthur Jones, who then ran a roadside attraction off Highway 11 in Slidell.

At the end of the film Garland's character was killed with a spear and fell out of a tree. She recalled:

They got me up in this tree and Roger said, "When you're killed, you have to drop"— and this was a big tree! I'm not exaggerating when I say it was at least a 20-foot drop. I said, "Well, will somebody be there?" And Roger said, "Yes, they’ll catch you." And by God, they had three guys underneath. And when they killed me, I just fell— dead weight- on these three poor guys! Roger said to me, "You're really one of the best stuntwomen I have ever worked with."

After making the movie Nelson went to see Corman in Hollywood and went to work for him, doing all sorts of jobs as well as acting. Based on his behind-the-scenes help and his role, he would go on to appear in about 15 Corman productions. He returned to Louisiana to film another low budget movie, Bayou, shot near Barataria Bay.

== Reception and legacy ==
The film was released on a double bill with Gunslinger, also directed by Corman with Garland. The Los Angeles Times said both movies "take ones credulity firmly by the neck, shake it, twist it, and finally bend it double before the action, such as it is, ends."

Another reviewer for the same paper said it had "stock tropic terrors."

While called "weak filler exploitation fare" by Variety, they cited that Corman's full use of the bayou was a plus.

The Monthly Film Bulletin agreed, liking the setting of the film in the swamps as giving a clichéd story a new aspect and said it was "not to be recommended for the fainthearted".

The Los Angeles Examiner found the film to be bogged down in cliche and apathy. The CEA Film Report found both the swamp setting and the footage of Mardi Gras to be a positive, but found the film as a whole uneventful.

Sight and Sound called it "more bizarre than accomplished" but thought it had "some rather diverting sidelights on female psychology."

The film was listed in the 1978 book The Fifty Worst Films of All Time by political pundit Michael Medved.

The Woolners later went on to finance Teenage Doll for Corman. Then in the early seventies they helped finance Corman's first movies for New World Pictures, The Student Nurses and The Big Bird Cage, before setting up their own company, Dimension. In July 1993, the film was featured in the movie-mocking television show Mystery Science Theater 3000 under the title Swamp Diamonds and with the instructional short What To Do on a Date.

In the pilot episode of 2019 Hulu series Reprisal, clips from Swamp Women are briefly seen during a sequence set at a drive-in movie theater.

=== Home media ===
The MST3K version of the film was released by Rhino Home Video as part of the Collection, Volume 10 (out-of-print on both Rhino's and MST3K's official websites) and Collection, Volume 10.2 DVD sets. As of January 2010, Volume 10.2 is out-of-print on Rhino's official website, but still available on MST3K's official website.

== See also ==
- List of American films of 1956
- List of American films of 1955
- List of films in the public domain in the United States
