= That Tennessee Beat =

1966 film

- Theatrical release poster
- Directed by: Richard Brill
- Screenplay by: Paul Schneider
- Produced by: Richard Brill
- Starring: Earl 'Snake' Richards; Sharon DeBord; Lightnin' Chance; Maurice Dembsky; Pete Drake; Dolores Faith
- Cinematography: Jack Steely
- Edited by: Ace Herman; Carl Pierson
- Production company: Lippert Pictures
- Distributed by: 20th Century Fox
- Release date: October 14, 1966
- Running time: 84 minutes
- Country: United States
- Language: English

That Tennessee Beat (also known as The Tennessee Beat) is a 1966 American drama film directed by Richard Brill and written by Paul Schneider. The film stars Earl 'Snake' Richards, Sharon DeBord, Lightnin' Chance, Maurice Dembsky, Pete Drake and Dolores Faith.

It was released on October 14, 1966, by 20th Century Fox.

The film marked Robert L. Lippert's return to filmmaking after a brief break, and its working title was Country Music.

== Plot ==
Jim Birdsell, hoping to become a country-western star, steals money for a trip to Nashville. He is robbed on the way and is left penniless again. He is taken in by a brother/sister singing group who take him in, and help him fulfill his dream.

== Cast ==
- Earl 'Snake' Richards as Jim Birdsell
- Sharon DeBord as Opal Nelson
- Lightnin' Chance as Sheriff
- Stoney Mountain Cloggers as themselves
- Maurice Dembsky as Doorman
- Pete Drake as himself
- Dolores Faith as Belle Scofield
- Rink Hardin as Wally Cooper
- Ernie Keller as announcer
- Ed Livingston as hoodlum
- Buddy Mize as hoodlum leader
- Minnie Pearl as Rev. Rose Conley
- Boots Randolph as himself
- Cecil Scaiffe as Dan Birdsell
- The Statler Brothers as themselves
- Sam Tarpley as ticket seller
- Merle Travis as Larry Scofield

== Reception ==
Boxoffice wrote: "Minnie Pearl's role is a non-singing one and she handles her part of Reverend Rose, a lady minister of undetermined denomination, with sincerity and feeling. Travis, who authored such hits as "Sixteen Tons" and "Mountain Dew," wrote and sings to self-accompaniment the title tune as well, as a sentimental ballad, "I'm Sorry." It is Travis' guitar playing around which Paul Schneider threads the screenplay that bridges the appearances of the rural song and dance specialists."
