= MQR-16 Gunrunner =

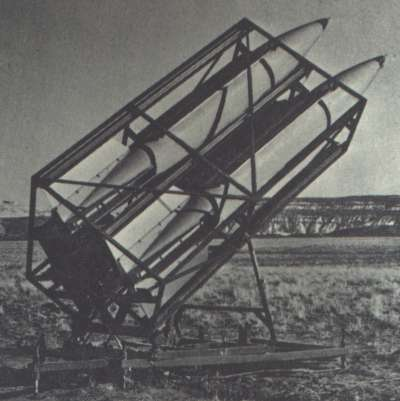
- Type: Target drone
- Place of origin: United States

Service history
- In service: 1969-1980s
- Used by: United States Army, United States Navy

Production history
- Manufacturer: Atlantic Research

Specifications
- Mass: 290 pounds (130 kg)
- Length: 16 feet (4.9 m)
- Diameter: 20 inches (510 mm)
- Engine: Booster, HVAR rocket; 5,800 lb_{f} (26 kN); Sustainer, 10KS300 rocket, 290 lb_{f} (1.3 kN)
- Propellant: solid fuel
- Operational range: 3 miles (4.8 km)
- Boost time: 10.86 sec
- Maximum speed: 575 mph (925 km/h)
- Guidance system: None
- Launch platform: Triple launcher

The MQR-16A Gunrunner was an unguided rocket developed by Atlantic Research during the 1960s. Designed with low cost as a priority, the MQR-16A was intended to act as a target drone for use in the development of man-portable surface-to-air missiles, and as a training target for the missile operators. Proving successful, the rocket served in the United States military until the 1980s.

== Design and development ==
Developed in the late 1960s, the Gunrunner was designed as an inexpensive aerial target, unguided and flying on a ballistic path, for use by the United States Army and United States Navy during the development and testing of the FIM-43 Redeye man-portable surface-to-air missile.

The design and construction of the Gunrunner was kept as simple as possible, with the rocket's stabilizing fins using plywood in their construction, and the solid-fueled powerplant being that of the reliable and widely used High Velocity Aerial Rocket (HVAR). The nose of the rocket was equipped with an infrared enhancer to allow for all-aspect target acquisition by the missile that was engaging the target.

== Operational history ==
Entering operational service in 1969, the Gunrunner was given the official designation of MQR-16A in 1971, and proved to be a success in service. Used for training soldiers in the operation of both the Redeye and the MIM-72 Chaparral SAMs, the missile was launched from a frame-type launcher that carried three missiles. Remaining in service until the mid-1980s, the Gunrunner was replaced in U.S. Army service by the MTR-15 BATS.
