= Christopher Finch =

New Zealand cricketer (born 1975)

Personal information
- Full name: Christopher John William Finch
- Born: 23 June 1975 (age 51); Balclutha, Otago, New Zealand
- Batting: Right-handed
- Bowling: Right-arm medium

Domestic team information
- Years: Team
- 1993/94–1995/96: Otago
- Source: CricInfo, 8 May 2016

Christopher John William Finch (born 23 June 1975) is a New Zealand former cricketer. He played three first-class and 24 List A matches for Otago between the 1993–94 and 1995–96 seasons.

Finch was born at Balclutha in 1975 and educated at Otago Boys' High School in Dunedin. Before making his senior debut he played under-19 One Day International matches for New Zealand.
