= Lawrence Woolner =

American film producer

Lawrence Henry Woolner (12 April 1912 – 21 July 1985) was an American film producer, distributor, exhibitor and executive. He worked with Roger Corman on a number of films, helping him found New World Pictures. However he clashed with Corman and soon joined Warner Communications to set up his own company, Dimension Pictures, which ran for ten years. He was the brother of producer Bernard Woolner.

== Select filmography ==
- The Young, the Evil and the Savage (1968) - producer
- Teenage Doll (1957) - associate producer
- Terminal Island (1973) - executive producer
- The Working Girls (1974) - executive producer
- Raw Force (1982) - producer
