= Woolner Brothers =

American film company

- Founded: 1955
- Founders: Lawrence Woolner; Bernard Woolner; David Woolner

The Woolner Brothers were an American film releasing company formed in 1955, made up of Lawrence (April 22, 1912 – July 21, 1985), Bernard (June 9, 1910 – February 21, 1977), and David Woolner.

== History ==
After US Army service in World War II, Lawrence started a New Orleans drive-in theatre in 1948. His brother Bernard had previously opened the first drive-in theatre in Memphis. Like other drive-in owners, the Woolners advanced money to low-budget B picture producers to finance their product. Their first release was Roger Corman's Swamp Women, followed by Corman's Teenage Doll, both released through Allied Artists. Bernard Woolner produced the financially successful Attack of the 50 Foot Woman in 1958.

The company moved to California in the early 1960s. The Woolners directly financed films made in Italy, and though they released several of Mario Bava's films in America, Bava turned down a contract to make films directly for them in 1965. The pair produced a pair of sword-and-sandal films featuring Reg Park as Hercules, a film based on Jules Verne's Five Weeks in a Balloon shot in Puerto Rico, a trio of giallo films, a pair of Eurospy films, two science fiction films and two hillbilly films filmed in the US.

Woolner Brothers' final release was The Sin of Adam and Eve filmed in Mexico that was released in 1969. Lawrence later became a partner in Corman's New World Pictures in 1970 as President in charge of Sales and Distribution, but left with two other members of New World to join Kinney National Company, which would later become Warner Communications, and form Dimension Pictures in 1971.

== Woolner Bros. releases ==
- Swamp Women (1956)
- Teenage Doll (1957)
- Attack of the 50 Foot Woman (1958)
- Hercules Conquers Atlantis/Hercules and the Captive Women (1961)
- Hercules in the Haunted World (1961)
- Flight of the Lost Balloon (1962)
- Castle of Blood (1964)
- Castle of the Living Dead (1964)
- Blood and Black Lace (1965)
- The Human Duplicators (1965)
- Mutiny in Outer Space (1965)
- The Las Vegas Hillbillys (1966)
- Hillbillys in a Haunted House (1967)
- Lightning Bolt (1967)
- Red Dragon (1967)
