= The Gun Runner =

- Directed by: Richard Compton
- Written by: Richard Compton
- Starring: Trent Dolan
- Release date: 1969
- Country: United States
- Language: English

The Gun Runner is a 1969 action film, the first directing credit for actor turned filmmaker Richard Compton.

== See also ==
- List of American films of 1969
