= List of Get Smart episodes =

Get Smart is an American comedy television series that satirizes the secret agent genre. Created by Mel Brooks and Buck Henry, the series stars Don Adams (as Maxwell Smart, Agent 86), Barbara Feldon (as Agent 99), and Edward Platt (as the Chief). It was initially broadcast from September 18, 1965, to May 15, 1970, the first four seasons on NBC, and the last on CBS. It ran for five seasons, with 138 half-hour episodes being produced in total.

The pilot episode was filmed in black-and-white, but the entire ensuing series was filmed in color.

Like most sitcoms of its time, Get Smart was not serialized, so the episodes generally have no relation to each other.

Each of the five seasons has been released on DVD by HBO; also, the entire series has been released in a single box set, first by Time Life, then by HBO.

On August 10, 2015, the entire series was officially released on digital streaming platforms for the first time in preparation for the series 50th anniversary.

== Series overview ==
Season	Episodes	Originally released		
Season	Episodes	First released	Last released	Network
1	30	September 18, 1965	May 7, 1966	NBC
2	30	September 17, 1966	April 22, 1967	NBC
3	26	September 16, 1967	April 6, 1968	NBC
4	26	September 21, 1968	March 29, 1969	NBC
5	26	September 26, 1969	May 15, 1970	CBS

== Episodes ==
=== Season 1 (1965–66) ===
Debuting on September 18, 1965, the series aired on Saturday nights following I Dream of Jeannie and opposite The Lawrence Welk Show (ABC) and The Trials of O'Brien (CBS).

The season earned executive producer Leonard Stern an Emmy nomination for Outstanding Comedy Series and Don Adams for Outstanding Continued Performance by an Actor in a Leading Role in a Comedy Series. Two episodes were nominated for Primetime Emmy Awards: "Diplomat's Daughter" for Outstanding Directorial Achievement in Comedy (Paul Bogart) and "Mr. Big" for Outstanding Writing Achievement in Comedy (Buck Henry and Mel Brooks).

No. overall	No. in season	Title	Directed by	Written by	Original release date	Prod. code
1	1	"Mr. Big"	Howard Morris	Mel Brooks and Buck Henry	September 18, 1965	001
Maxwell Smart, Agent 86, learns from the Chief of Control (Edward Platt) that a machine called the Inthermo has been stolen from its inventor, Professor Hugo Dante (Vito Scotti). The Inthermo has great destructive capabilities. KAOS's Mr. Big (Michael Dunn) has demanded a large ransom or he will use the Inthermo against cities. Maxwell meets Agent 99. The two go to talk with Dante's assistant, Zelinka (Janine Gray). They want to know where she was when Dante was abducted. Later, Max and 99 are captured and taken to Mr. Big. They learn that Zelinka is working with Mr. Big and his first target is the Statue of Liberty. Max and 99 are able to escape and they free Dante. With Dante's help, they are able to destroy the Inthermo and Mr. Big. Kelton Garwood as Garth. Robert Hoy as Henchman.: Note: This was the only black and white episode of Get Smart; all others were in color. This pilot episode introduced a running gag of a captured Maxwell Smart trying to bluff his way out by claiming that an overwhelming force is going to rescue him starting with "Would you believe..." and those who capture him saying either "I find that hard to believe " or "I don't think so...".
2	2	"Diplomat's Daughter"	Paul Bogart	Gerald Gardner and Dee Caruso	September 25, 1965	005
The Chief tells Max that in the last ten days eight blondes have been kidnapped in the area. They suspect KOAS. The Chief says that Princess Ingrid of Scandinavia will be visiting Washington and she's a blonde. He wants Max to protect her. They go to see Carleton (Frank De Vol) in the Lab to get some equipment for Max. Max and 99 go to Ingrid's hotel room. Flowers are delivered to Ingrid that have a microphone in them. The Claw (Leonard Strong) listens to Max's plans for Ingrid. Max is captured by The Claw and his henchman Bobo (Lee Kolima). Max is able to escape. He finds 99 and Ingrid in a dance club. The Claw and some of his men show up. Max is able to over power them. Ingrid and the other blonde women are safe.
3	3	"School Days"	Paul Bogart	Stan Burns and Mike Marmer	October 2, 1965	004
Max and 99 are both undercover at the CONTROL spy school to find an undercover KAOS spy. Max and 99 meet Dean Watson (Byron Morrow) and Hillary Gainsborough (Ben Wright), from Control's London section. Neither Watson nor Hillary know that Max is undercover. Max believes that one of the three new trainees, Grillak (Leo Gordon), Zukor (Henry Brandon) or Dimitri (Phil Roth) is the KOAS spy. Max does not do well in weapons class. When something goes wrong, Max has to tell Hillary and the Dean that he's undercover. Someone makes an attempt on Max's life, but fails. Max makes several attempts to find which of the three is the spy, with no luck. Max and 99 are knocked out and captured. They manage to escape. When Grillak, Zukor and Dimitri are able to prove they are not the spy, Max thinks it is Hillary. Hillary winds up confessing he is the spy. Kitty Kelly as Mrs. Green. Robert Karvelas as Control Trainee Disguised as Little Old Lady.
4	4	"Our Man in Toyland"	Don Richardson	Stan Burns and Mike Marmer	October 9, 1965	002
The Chief and Hodgkins (Bryan O'Byrne) are trying to figure out how KAOS is smuggling secrets out of the country. They believe KAOS is using Bowers department store as a front. Max goes to Bowers and looks for a suspect. 99 is working there. Mr. Bunny (John Hoyt a spoof of Ernst Stavro Blofeld), the Manager of the store, comes by. Bunny seems interested in Max and Max leaves. Leopold (Buck Kartalian) is following Max, but is caught by another Control agent. Max goes back to the store, but Frieda (Helen Kleeb) is at the counter where 99 was. Other Control agents that were at the store are also missing. Max finds 99. 99 discovers they are using Polly Dollies to smuggle out the secrets. When one pulls the doll's string, Polly reveals top secrets. Max is able to get this information to the Chief. Max and 99 are trapped in the store by Bunny, Frieda and Gorcheck (Lou Nova). Using children's toys, Max and 99 are able to fight their way to safety and stop KAOS' smuggling ring. Robert Karvelas as Control Agent. Note: A spoof of Our Man in Havana; the title is a spoof of Babes in Toyland.
5	5	"Now You See Him... Now You Don't"	Paul Bogart	Arne Sultan and Marvin Worth	October 16, 1965	006
Dr. Carl Haskell (Gregory Morton) comes to see Max at his apartment. Max knows that Haskell was working on a secret project for the government when he disappeared. Haskell says he was kidnapped by KAOS. He was able to escape, but KAOS has his invisibility ray gun. Haskell still has the plans for the ray gun. Suddenly there are two invisible KAOS agents in the room. They say that they will sell the plans for 10 million dollars and they leave with Haskell. The Chief comes up with a plan to get the ray gun back. The two KAOS agents, now visible, come to Max's apartment and take him away. 99, who is watching from another building, is also taken. Max meets KAOS agent Ehrlich (Joseph Ruskin). 99 is brought in the room. Max learns that the ray gun was a hoax and Haskell is working with KAOS. Haskell and Ehrlich take Max and 99 to Max's apartment to get the money. Max and 99 are able to capture Haskell and Ehrlich. Val Avery as KAOS Agent #1. Note: The title is based upon a common magician's dialogue with the audience.
6	6	"Washington 4, Indians 3"	Richard Donner	Gerald Gardner and Dee Caruso	October 23, 1965	007
Native Americans stop a bus. They are looking for a CONTROL agent on board. They have a message to bring back to headquarters. Agent 43 calls Max and tells him he is in Arizona and was stopped by Native Americans. The message say that they threaten to start a war if they do not get all of their land back in 48 hours. Max has a meeting with an Army General (Donald Curtis), an Admiral (Bill Zuckert) and an Air Force General (Willis Bouchey). They want Max to infiltrate the Native American camp and find out their exact plans. Max and 99 dress as cowboys and meet 43 in Arizona. They capture a native and Max takes his clothes. Max is taken to see Red Cloud (Anthony Caruso). What Max did not know is that the native they captured was to marry Red Cloud's daughter, White Cloud. Max learns that the natives have a missile. Red Cloud holds a war council meeting. They discover Max is not one of them. Before they can kill Max, 99 arrives. Red Cloud launches the missile which is shaped like a giant arrow. It does no damage. Roberto Contreras as Blue Skies. Robert Karvelas as Native American. Charles Soldani as Native American. Note: Title changed to "Washington 4, Indians 3" for DVD release; "Redskins" was a common sports team name in the 1960s but is now considered racist.) The title is a parody of a sporting event's score and based on the American football team the Washington Redskins.
7	7	"KAOS in CONTROL"	Don Richardson	Hal Goldman and Al Gordon	October 30, 1965	003
An alarm goes off at CONTROL. Hodgkins sees that someone tried to make an impression of the lock to the conference room. The Chief is concerned as CONTROL will be hosting a conference for some of the smartest scientists on the planet. Hodgkins says that Max has the keys to that lock. Chief worries that a KAOS agent has infiltrated CONTROL. Professor Windish (Robert Cornthwaite) shows Max and 99 his latest invention, an Electro-Retrogressor Gun. It emits a ray that retrogresses a person's psyche to the point where he or she becomes an eight-year-old child. Windish gives the gun to his assistants, Henry (Ed Peck) and Alma (Mission Impossible's Barbara Bain). Max and 99 inspect the conference room. Windish tells Chief that his Retrogressor Gun has been stolen. Before Windish can tell Chief who took it, he is shot with the Gun. The Chief is then also shot. The scientists arrive. Henry tells Max that he suspects Alma. Max's knowledge of Captain Kangaroo helps him confirm it is Alma. Max is able to get the Gun away from Alma and shoot her. Frank Baker as Scientist. Robert Karvelas as Control Agent.
8	8	"The Day Smart Turned Chicken"	Frank McDonald	Pat McCormick and Ron Friedman	November 6, 1965	009
Max goes to answer the door to his apartment. A Cowboy (Simon Oakland) falls in with a knife in his back. The Cowboy says they are going to poison the Ambassador (George J. Lewis). Max calls the Chief and tells him to come over. The Cowboy then disappears. The Chief arrives and thinks Max dreamed the whole thing. Max is to testify against KAOS the next day and Chief wants him to rest. When Max goes to bed, the Cowboy is there. He says that KAOS is going to poison the Ambassador. Dr. Fish (Howard Caine) comes to the door looking for Mrs. Dawson (Iris Adrian). Max says she lives down the hall. Dr. Fish says the Cowboy is dead. Max wants Dr. Fish to talk to the Chief. He goes to Mrs. Dawson's apartment and she's never heard of Dr. Fish. Max does not know this is all being staged by KAOS to make him look like he's losing his mind. This will discredit his testimony. In court, many witnesses are brought up to make Max look crazy. Max is able to prove that the man who dressed as a Cowboy, who is there in court in plain clothes, is the KAOS agent who staged the whole thing. Phillip Pine as Blake. Richard Karlan as Bruno. Don Brodie as Costume Man. Arthur Tovey as Party Guest. Note: It is revealed that the Chief's first name is Thaddeus.
9	9	"Satan Place"	Frank McDonald	Stan Burns and Mike Marmer	November 13, 1965	010
The Chief is going on vacation. When his car won't start, Max looks under the hood. The Chief is attacked by two men and they take him away. Back at CONTROL, Windish tells Max that the Chief met with foul play. His car was found abandoned ten miles away. In the car was found a ransom note. They want $200,000 or they will kill the Chief. The Chief meets Harvey Satan (Joseph Sirola) and his assistant Rudolph (Len Lesser, Seinfeld's Uncle Leo). Harvey tells Chief that a Doctor will perform mind-control surgery and turn him into a KAOS agent. Max is told where to drop off the money. The KAOS agent is tracked and Max and 99 go to where he took the money. They see a Nurse and a man she calls Doctor Von Havick, who is to perform the surgery. Max and 99 capture them and take their place. They are taken to Chief, who is a bit frozen. Satan is suspicious. Rudolph finds the real doctor and tells Satan. Max is able to freeze Satan, Rudolph and Gregor (Jack Perkins) and free the Chief. The Chief learns that Max was only able to raise $600 for the ransom. Roy Jenson as Thug. Note: The title is based upon the book, film, and television series, Peyton Place. The Chief's car is a "Zebra Mustang", custom made by George Barris.
10	10	"Our Man in Leotards"	Richard Donner	Mel Brooks and Gary Belkin	November 20, 1965	008
The Chief is showing Max a new spy car. An alarm goes off and Saunders (Robert Karvelas) tells the Chief that someone has stolen the Immobilo, a new drug invented by CONTROL. Chief mentions that 99 has been placed in Emilio Naharana's (Michael Pate) dance troop. Emilio represents a faction in his country that is not favorable to the US. Max and Chief think the thief could be Emilio. Windish tells them that Immobilo is harmless, but when used, puts the victim into a temporary state of paralysis. Peach fuzz creates an immunity to the drug. Max goes to the Pinerovian Embassy. Emilio wants the Doorman (Nestor Paiva) to find Julio (Robert Carricart), the Ambassador's secretary. Julio tells the Doorman that the Ambassador will see no one. Max finds 99. Max learns that Emilio wants to use the Immobilo to prevent the Ambassador from signing a pact with the US. Max disguises himself as a dancer. He and 99 try to warn the Ambassador and Emilio shows up. Max is able to use the Immobilo on Emilio and protect the Ambassador. John Stephenson as Parkerson. Edward Colmans as Don Hernando. Robert J. Stevenson as Guard. Note: The title is based on the spy novel Our Man in Havana.
11	11	"Too Many Chiefs"	Bruce Bilson	Gerald Gardner and Dee Caruso	November 27, 1965	011
The Chief, Max and 99 bring Tanya Lupescu (Susanne Cramer) to a hotel. They then see her picture in the newspaper. They realize word has gotten out about her. Several CONTROL and KAOS agents are there. They are able to leave before the agents kill each other. Meanwhile at KAOS headquarters, Kaos Leader (Harry Basch) is not happy that CONTROL has Tanya. She can reveal several KAOS leaders and must be killed. Alexi Sebastian, a master impersonator, is assigned the job. The Chief wants Tanya to stay at Max's apartment. Tanya tells Max that she discovered the secret of the KAOS coding system. Chief tells Max that they learned Alexi Sebastian will be coming for Tanya. Chief says that Alexi blinks a lot under a bright light. Kaos Leader reveals Alexi, who is disguised as the Chief. 99 is at Max's place and the Chief comes by. She takes him up to Tanya's room. Max lets Chief in, but it is really Alexi. At first the two do not run into each other. When they finally do, somehow Max captures Alexi. Victor French as Insurance Man. Robert Karvelas as Hotel Cashier. Note: The title is from the common expression, "Too many chefs spoil the broth."
12	12	"My Nephew the Spy"	Bruce Bilson	Arne Sultan and Marvin Worth	December 4, 1965	012
Max is in a shoe store. The Salesman (Vincent Beck) is getting annoyed with Max as he's been there an hour and hasn't decided on anything. What Max doesn't know is the store is also a KAOS communications center. KAOS agent Victor (Conrad Janis) discovers Max is with CONTROL. Victor follows Max hoping to kill him. Max tells the Chief that a car tried to run him over. Chief tells Max that CONTROL has learned that his Aunt Bertha (Maudie Prickett) and Uncle Abner (Charles Lane) are coming to see him. Max must not let them know he is a secret agent. When Max gets to his apartment, Victor is there. After a struggle, Max manages to get Victor's gun. Bertha and Abner are at the door. Max wants Victor to pretend he is an old army buddy. Things get complicated when 99 shows up. Max says she's the maid. Bertha takes 99 around the apartment and has her cleaning things. There is another struggle and Victor gets out of the apartment. Max races after him. Max gets to the shoe store. Bertha and Abner follow him and think Max works there. It takes some doing, but Max overpowers Victor and the Salesman.
13	13	"Aboard the Orient Express"	Frank McDonald	Robert C. Dennis and Earl Barret	December 11, 1965	014
CONTROL couriers aboard the Orient Express are being murdered in order to prevent them from delivering important information. The Chief wants to send 99 on the next courier mission because he doesn't think they'll suspect a woman agent. Max inadvertently attaches the briefcase to his wrist so he'll have to go. Chief, Max and 99 go to see Doctor Minelli (Del Close), CONTROL's Special Weapons Advisor. Chief says that the agents were killed with a highly toxic gas. Minelli gives Max a hat that turns into a gas mask. He also gives Max shoes that will lift him off the ground. Max is on the train and meets Agent 44 (Victor French), who gives him a message. A Countess (Carol Ohmart) joins Max in his cabin. 99 arrives and Max looks for his contact. The lights on the train go out. When they come back on, the chain from the briefcase to Max's handcuff had been cut. Ernst, a British agent, is killed. Demetrios (Theo Marcuse) instructs his dog Krochanska to release the toxic gas, which doesn't effect dogs. Max and 99 use their gas masks and overpower Demetrios. Maurice Marsac as The Porter. Jack Donner as The Courier. Cameo appearance by Johnny Carson as the train conductor (he appears in the credits as the "Special Guest Conductor"). Note: A spoof of Murder on the Orient Express.
14	14	"Weekend Vampire"	Bruce Bilson	Gerald Gardner and Dee Caruso	December 18, 1965	013
Max is playing chess with Agent 52. Max goes to get some coffee. When he returns, 52 is dead. Chief says three CONTROL agents have been killed and each on a weekend. Professor Sontag (Ford Rainey) is looking over the body. Chief mentions that the victims are found murdered with mysterious puncture marks on their necks. Vampires are brought up, but Chief says that's superstition. Sontag is on the phone and mentions the name Drago. Max tells 99 that Dr. Drago (Martin Kosleck) used to be with CONTROL. He was caught doing some unauthorized experiments. Sontag says the autopsy revealed nothing. Max becomes suspicious and he and 99 follow Sontag. They wind up at Drago's home. They claim to be newlyweds and their car broke down. They are taken to a room. Drago goes into a coffin, which actually leads to his lab. After some investigating, Drago admits to Max and 99 that he killed the agents because they testified against him. Drago shows them the device he invented that caused the puncture wounds and poisoned the victims. Before he can kill 99, Sontag arrives and shoots Drago. Robert Karvelas as Control Agent Taking Photos.
15	15	"Survival of the Fattest"	Frank McDonald	Mel Brooks and Ronny Pearlman	December 25, 1965	016
Prince Sully (Dan Seymour) is eating in his hotel room. Max comes by as Bill Bamford, president of an oil company. The Chambermaid comes by to drop off a refrigerator. From the closet, Max calls the Chief. Chief says to keep an eye on the Prince as there is a plot to kidnap him. The Chambermaid knocks out the Prince and takes him away. Back at CONTROL, Chief tells Max that Sully is always trying to gain weight. His followers give him his weight in gold and that keeps his country solvent. If he doesn't weigh 300 pounds, another faction, that is unfriendly to the US, takes over the country. After Max tells him about the Chambermaid, Chief realizes it was Mary 'Jack' Armstrong (Karen Steele), the strongest female counter spy. Parker (Milton Selzer) gives Max a truth serum to use on Mary. At the hotel, Max is talking with Mary. After some switching of glasses, Max accidentally drinks the serum. He reveals who he is and passes out. When Max comes to, he is in a private gym and Sully is there being forced to work out. Max is forced to call The Chief and tell him everything is alright. Chief is able to trace where Max is and capture Mary. Turns out the Chief and Mary were old friends. The Prince losing the weight actually works out to his benefit. Ned Romero as Agent #2. Note: The title is from the common idiom "survival of the fittest."
16	16	"Double Agent"	Frank McDonald	Joseph C. Cavella and Carol Cavella	January 8, 1966	015
Max and 99 are listening in on a KAOS meeting. Alex (Robert Ellenstein) says they must infiltrate the US Central Military Complex. One agent mentions that Maxwell Smart has top clearance to that building. They wonder if they can recruit Max. In the Chief's office, Professor Parker shows Chief the radio and tracking device he created that looks like a fly. Max comes by and swats the fly. Chief wants Max to infiltrate KAOS. Max must lose his loyal appearance to CONTROL by becoming a drunken bum. Chief gives Max some money to lose gambling at a place that KAOS frequents. Max winds up winning at poker. Chief gives Max a pill that will absorb any alcohol he drinks. He can then pretend to be drunk. Max is dressed as a bum and is at the bar. 99, not knowing about the Chief's plan, finds Max and wonders what's wrong with him. Max gets her to leave. Chief contacts Max and says the next step is they'll stage a fight between the two of them. Max will pretend to beat up Chief. Max is brought to Alex and 99 is caught outside. Alex wants Max to kill 99. Max and 99 learn that Alex and the other KAOS men are actually double agents. Arthur Batanides as KAOS Agent #1. Dave Barry as KAOS Agent #2. Clay Tanner as KAOS Agent #3. Gregg Palmer as The Texan. Jack Orrison as The Drunk. Robert Karvelas as Roulette Croupier.
17	17	"Kisses for KAOS"	Gary Nelson	Stan Burns and Mike Marmer	January 15, 1966	017
Max has been keeping a consulate under surveillance. He tells 99 that no one suspicious has been there. Just then there is an explosion. Back at CONTROL, Max shows the Chief part of a painting that was delivered to the consulate a few minutes before the explosion. Chief mentions an art gallery owned by Rex Savage (Michael Dante). Chief says that parts of paintings from that gallery were found at the last two explosions. All three places had information that would be detrimental to KAOS. They have no picture or fingerprints of Savage. Chief wants 99 to pose as an art expert with Max as her chauffeur. Turns out Rex is a chemist and he has teamed up with painter Mondo (John Abbott) to produce the explosive paintings. At the gallery, 99 introduces herself to Rex as Melissa Westbrook. Max and 99 have no luck getting the picture nor the prints. Mondo tells Rex that he is sure he has seen that chauffeur before. 99 tells Max that Rex will drive her home. Later, 99 tells Max and Chief that Rex is coming to her apartment for dinner. Chief suggests having the dinner at Max's place and he could be the butler. Professor Parker gives some items to Max and 99 to use. At dinner, Rex finally takes off his gloves. Max answers the door and it is Mondo with a gun. Mondo tells Rex that Max is a CONTROL agent. There are some problems, but Rex and Mondo are captured. Ray Kellogg as Policeman.
18	18	"The Dead Spy Scrawls"	Gary Nelson	Stan Burns and Mike Marmer	January 22, 1966	018
Max and 99 are at a bus station waiting to meet with Agent 46. 46 arrives and signals that he is being followed. KAOS agent Stryker (Leonard Nimoy) shoots and kills 46. Stryker goes to a pool hall where the Shark (Jack Lambert) is playing. Stryker tells Shark that he saw Max at the bus station. Stryker will pick up Max's trail and kill him. It turns out the pool hall is a KAOS communication center. Back at CONTROL, Parker figures out the last message that 46 left. It says that 46 knew an Informer (Don Brodie) that knew about the communication center. Max arranges to meet the Informer at the same bus station. At the station, Max mistakes a Vendor (Roy Engel) for the Informer. Max does meet the Informer, who is then shot by Stryker. The Informer does give Max a clue. The Chief figures out about the pool hall. Chief has Willie Marconi (Harry Bartell, based on real life Pool expert Willie Mosconi) teach Max how to play a good game of pool, but it doesn't go well. Parker gives Max some things that will help him play better. Max and 99 go to the pool hall and Max challenges Shark to a game. Stryker tells Shark that the man he is playing against is Max. Max and 99 learn that the pool table is the decoding machine. They are able to overpower Shark and Stryker. George Holmes as Man in the Pool Parlor. Robert Karvelas as Man in the Pool Parlor. Note: The title is a play on "Dead Sea Scrolls."
19	19	"Back to the Old Drawing Board"	Bruce Bilson	Gary Clarke	January 29, 1966	019
Mr. Natz (Ted de Corsia) tells Dr. Ratton (Jim Boles) that KAOS would like to capture Dr. Shotwire (Patrick O'Moore) because of his brilliant work in robotics. Natz says they haven't been able to get to Shotwire because Maxwell Smart has been guarding him. Ratton says that Hymie can get both Max and Shotwire in 24 hours. Natz learns that Hymie is a humanoid robot invented by Ratton. At CONTROL, Chief tells Max that Shotwire says Max has set back his work six months. Chief wants Max, 99, Agent 44 and Agent 91 to go to a party being given for Shotwire. Max and 99 run into Hymie at the meeting place and think he is 91. At the party, Hymie is able to disarm Max without him knowing it. Chief contacts Max and warns him that there is a KAOS agent at the party. Hymie knocks out Agent 44. Ratton looses contact with Hymie. Hymie winds up drinking several cocktails. Max wants to get Shotwire out of the building, but he won't go. Hymie captures Max, 99 and Shotwire and they are brought to a KAOS hideout. 99 tells Max that Hymie is a KAOS robot. Natz reminds Max that it was because of Max that he spent ten years in prison. Ratton orders Hymie to kill Max, but instead Hymie shoots Ratton and knocks out Natz. Hymie frees Max, 99 and Shotwire. At CONTROL Hymie tells them that he'd like to work for IBM. Note: This is the first episode with Hymie (played by Dick Gautier). This episode is notable for an extended physical comedy routine involving Max and Hymie.
20	20	"All in the Mind"	Bruce Bilson	Gerald Gardner and Dee Caruso	February 5, 1966	020
Secretary Joanna Sloan (Merry Anders) is caught going through some files by her boss, psychiatrist Dr. Myron Braam (Torin Thatcher). She calls Max and tells him that Braam is passing information he receives from his patients to KAOS. Joanna is then killed. At CONTROL, Chief calls Braam claiming to be a General from the Pentagon. He wants to send a Colonel Smart to be evaluated because he's been acting disturbed. Chief wants 99 to go with Max and pose as his wife. While Braam is busy with Max, 99 can look through Braam's files. Chief wants Max to talk to Dr. Stueben (Robert F. Simon) to get ideas how to act disturbed. Max and 99 arrive at Braam's office. Braam is recording his interview with Max when he hears a noise in the outer office. When Braam goes to check on 99, Max discovers the tape recorder. Braam becomes suspicious and goes back into his office. Braam pulls a gun on Max and tells his assistant Markovich (King Moody) to bring in Max's wife. 99 isn't in the office. Max manages to get away and finds 99 in a phone booth. They are trapped in the booth and it starts filling with water. Max and 99 are able to get out of the booth and capture Braam and Markovich. William Tannen as Admiral. Janet Waldo as Telephone Operator (voice). Note: This episode is notable for its use of a secret KAOS weapon: a phone booth that fills with water.
21	21	"Dear Diary"	Murray Golden	Stan Burns and Mike Marmer	February 12, 1966	022
At Spy City, a Retirement Home For Secret Agents, Max comes to see Herb Gaffer (Vaughn Taylor), Agent Four. Herb sent a message to CONTROL that someone tried to get into his room. Herb had kept a dairy which contains a lot of information about CONTROL'S code system, personal, and location of bases. He wants to turn the dairy over to CONTROL for safe keeping. Max thinks he sees someone behinds some curtains. When he goes to look, someone takes Herb. Back at CONTROL, 99 finds blueprints to Spy City. Chief tells Max and 99 to see his old friend Agent #8 (Burt Mustin). If there is anything else they need, they should see retired lab man, Professor Bush (Byron Foulger), a friend of Gaffer's. Bush shows Max and 99 the Spy City Museum. They do not notice that Gaffer is on one of the tables. Bush then brings them to George Newfield (William Keene) and Agnes Davenport (Ellen Corby), who live on the same floor as Herb. Neither George nor Agnes claim to know anything about Herb's diary. Max meets Agent 8, who gives him a clue as to where the diary is. Max and 99 capture Mace the Handyman (Ted Gehring), who is looking for the diary. Mace is shot by someone. Max thinks there must be a double agent. Max and 99 finally find Herb and he gives them the diary. Newfield arrives with a gun, but Max is able to shoot him first.
22	22	"Smart, the Assassin"	Bruce Bilson	Budd Grossman	February 19, 1966	021
At the Regency Club, Max and the Chief are playing chess. Sedwick Devonshire (Murray Matheson) brings by some coffee and rolls. Devonshire sees the waiter squirt something into Chief's coffee and stops him from drinking it. Back at CONTROL, Chief is concerned that a KAOS agent was able to get into the Regency Club. Max and 99 are worried about Chief being unprotected. It turns out that Devonshire is working with KAOS. He wants Max brought to him alive. Two KAOS agents (Tony Lo Bianco and Ken Scott) capture Max. Devonshire gives Max a brain washing pill. Max is instructed to shoot Chief during their chess game. Max comes to and realizes he is trapped in a KAOS location. Devonshire wants Shirley (Eileen O'Neill), a Woman Agent, to help Max escape. But Max doesn't trust her. More attempts to free Max don't work. Max finally gets free. Max and Chief are at the Regency Club. Max hears the code word "checkmate", but shoots Devonshire instead. Shep Houghton as Club Patron. Robert Karvelas as Club Patron.
23	23	"I'm Only Human"	Murray Golden	Stan Burns, Mike Marmer, Pat McCormick and Ron Friedman	February 26, 1966	023
99 comes by Max's apartment. CONTROL dog Fang is there ever since he was retired. Fang seems depressed. 99 mentions that Agent 73 took his dog to a kennel after it was retired and it made the dog feel better. At CONTROL, Chief tells Max and 99 that 73 was killed by his dog. Chief has a list of other Washington officals killed by their dogs. He believes KAOS is behind it. The dogs were all sent to the Washington Animal Spa. Max suggests using Fang, but Chief does not think Fang is up to it. Chief and Max go to see Carleton (Frank De Vol) about another CONTROL dog, but they are not ready. Chief agrees to use Fang and parrot B17. Max and 99 drop off Fang and B17 at the spa. KAOS agent Beastmaster (Oscar Beregi Jr.) learns it was Maxwell Smart that dropped the animals off. Fang's transmitter is not working and Max wants to rescue Fang. Chief orders Max not to. Max and 99 go anyway. They are captured by Beastmaster. Beastmaster tells them that Fang has been brainwashed. Beastmaster knows Chief is coming to rescue Max and 99. He has set up an explosive that will go off when Fang barks. Just as Chief arrives, Max finds a way to have Fang drop the bomb down the shaft where Beastmaster is hiding. Gregg Palmer as KAOS Agent. Robert Karvelas as CONTROL Agent.
24	24	"Stakeout on Blue Mist Mountain"	Murray Golden	Stan Dreben and Howard Merrill	March 5, 1966	024
Chief wants Max to pick up a special suitcase from Professor Parker and meet him at the airport. Max is suddenly attacked by two KAOS agents, but he overpowers them. At the airport, Chief tells Max that a KAOS agent will be getting off the plane. Chief wants Max to switch suitcases with him while 99 distracts him. Chief says a lot of KAOS agents have been flying into Washington carrying similar suitcases. They need to find out what is in them. Agent 44, disguised as a piece of luggage, points out the KAOS agent. Max messes up the switching of the suitcases and they have to capture the agent. Back at CONTROL, Parker finds a strange piece of metal in the suitcase. Captured agent Nealis (Lew Gallo) lets it slip that the agents are each carrying a part and will meet at Blue Mist Mountain. That is near a US missile base. Chief, Max and 99 go to a cabin near the mountain. Max will pose as a KAOS agent. Chief learns that the parts are for an atomic bomb and Max says the agents told him it will go off at midnight They go to the KAOS cabin. Two of the KAOS agents wind up shooting each other and the third gets away. While communicating with Parker, Max clumsily disarms the bomb with seconds to spare. Ted Knight as KAOS agent #1. Jason Wingreen as KAOS Agent #2. Robert Karvelas as KAOS Agent #3.
25	25	"The Amazing Harry Hoo"	Gary Nelson	Gerald Gardner and Dee Caruso	March 12, 1966	025
Max is following KAOS Agent Number 3 (Robert Ito). 3 spots Max and they start shooting at each other. 3 gets away and 99 stops Max. Back at CONTROL, Chief tells Max he was only to follow 3, not apprehend him. They need to follow 3 to the man in charge of KAOS' data smuggling operation. They believe 3 has the formula for a tranquilizer bomb. Max and 99 follow 3 to San Francisco. The Claw ("Not the Craw! The Craw!") is back and he tells his henchman Bobo (Lee Kolima) that Max has fallen into his trap. Max and 99 find a dead KAOS agent in a hotel room. A Policeman (Vince Howard) introduces Max to Harry Hoo (Joey Forman), a Charlie Chan-type Hawaiian police inspector. Harry has a keen eye for detail and two theories to explain anything. They find a clue that leads them to a Chinese laundromat, where Max and 99 are captured by the Claw. Claw's smuggling operation used the laundromat as facade (through the real money is actually in the laundry). Harry shows up, frees Max and 99 and captures Claw and Bobo. James Millhollin as Ticket Seller.
26	26	"Hubert's Unfinished Symphony"	Gary Nelson	Stan Burns and Mike Marmer	March 19, 1966	026
Max and Chief are at a performance by CONTROL agent and violin player, Rudolph Hubert (Andre Philippe). After the performance, Hubert is to give them the name of KAOS' new Mr. Big. When Hubert bows at the end of his concert, he gives Max and Chief a signal that means he is in trouble. In his dressing room, Hubert writes something on a piece of music and he is then shot and killed. Max and Chief are posing as Wilcox and Giles when the Police Lieutenant (Richard Webb) questions them. The Lieutenant is also questioning Badeff (Bert Freed), Nicola Darby (Sarah Marshall) and piano player Wolenska (John Myhers), as they were the last to see Hubert alive. The way Hubert was found makes it look as though he killed himself. Max and Chief check with Agent 44 to see if he knows anything. Chief calls Professor Parker and tells him to go to the lab and set up search operation for the concert hall. Max finds Nicola in Hubert's dressing room. Later, Max finds Badeff in the dressing room. Both claim they did not know Hubert personally, but Max suspects them both. Max finds Wolenska in the dressing room and he takes a piece of Hubert's music. Max, 99, Badeff and Nicola are listening to Wolenska play some of Hubert's music. Badeff realizes that in the music is a clue that he is Mr. Big. He wants Nicola to get Boris to set up Wolenska's piano to get rid of Wolenska and the music. Max and 99 figure out Badeff is Mr. Big, but then they are captured by him. Max and 99 manage to escape, capture Badeff, Nicola and Boris and save Wolenska.
27	27	"Ship of Spies"	Bruce Bilson	Buck Henry and Leonard Stern	April 2, 1966	027
28	28	"Ship of Spies"	Bruce Bilson	Buck Henry and Leonard Stern	April 9, 1966	028
Part 1: Max is undercover in a diner. Chief comes in. Max tells him that whoever stole the plans to the nuclear amphibian battleship is going to smuggle them out of the country tonight. Max made contact with a KAOS informant, who will tell Max what ship they are planning to use. The KAOS informant (Murray Alper) is shot entering the diner. The only clue as to who fired the shot is a clip-clop noise he makes as he walks. Before dying, the informant tells Chief and Max that Evening Star sails at midnight. On board the ship Max makes contact with Agent 44, who has a list of suspects. Max hears a clip-clop noise and sees his doorknob turn. Max grabs a woman who calls herself Consuela Merendez. She is a professional dancer and she thought it was her cabin. The clip-clop noise was her castanets. Max hears more clip-clops and sees a man with a cane entering a stateroom. Max runs into 99 who says she is on a two week vacation. 99 suggests Max speak with Captain Groman (Harold J. Stone). Max gets into the room of the man with the cane. 99 follows and is knocked to the floor. There is a clip-clop noise going down the hallway. They find the man with a knife in his back. He says he is Inspector Sehokian, from International CONTROL. He says the plans are not plans and dies. Max goes searching on deck. It is very foggy. Max hears the clip-clops and then shots are fired. Max falls overboard and 99 is locked in her room. Paul Lukather as Baccardo. Fred Aldrich as Barfly. Robert Karvelas as Larabee. Part 2: Max is still in the water. 99 wants to throw him a raft, but it inflates before she can get it through the porthole. Max does get rescued. 99 calls Chief and tells him that someone tried to kill Max. She says that Inspector Sehokian said the plans are not plans. 99 also mentions suspects Consuela Merendez and Hector Baccardo, a Portuguese polo player. Another attempt on Max's life happens when a mast almost hits him. 99's radio is destroyed. Max goes to see Captain Graumann, while 99 keeps Graumann's assistant Fuji busy. Max tells Graumann that he is a CONTROL agent. Max says that someone on his ship has stolen plans to a nuclear amphibian battleship. Max also mentions the clip-clop noise. Graumann says he will do what he can to help. What Max does not know is that Graumann has a wooden leg that makes that noise. Max and 99 get a message they believe is from 44 that tells them to meet him on deck. 44 tells them that he heard Baccardo talking about the plans. Just then 44 is shot. Baccardo attacks Max, but Max knocks him out. Max asks Graumann to use his radio to call CONTROL. Max sees his wooden leg. Graumann shoots at Max, but hits Fuji instead. Max tells 99 that it was Graumann that had a model of the amphibian battleship and killed the others.
29	29	"Shipment to Beirut"	David Alexander	Arne Sultan	April 23, 1966	029
Max is at the Richelieu (Lee Bergere) Fashion Shop. He winds up buying a very expensive gown. Back at CONTROL, Chief says there are no hidden plans sewn into the gown. Max says that one of the models called him and told him about the stolen plans for a supersonic bomber. Max obviously talked to the wrong model. Max goes back, talks to another model and buys another expensive dress. There are no plans in the dress. Max tells Chief that they know KAOS has the stolen plans. They know that Richelieu has been tied in with KAOS. Max wants Chief to give him one more chance. Max goes back and model Mildred Spencer reveals she is the one who called him. Richelieu sees her talking to Max and she is later captured. Chief arrives with several agents. Richelieu says that Mildred had to leave. Max then sees a mannequin that looks exactly like Mildred. Furious that Max spent a ton of money and did not get any information, Chief takes Max off the case. 99 then goes undercover as a model. She calls Max and tells him that Richelieu's latest creations will flown to Beirut tonight. She wants Max to come by and pose as a mannequin. 99 tells Max that Richelieu had Mildred sprayed with a plastic solution that turned her into a mannequin. Max learns that they transferred the plans to micro-thread and used the thread to seam the dresses. Max calls Chief and tells him to intercept the dresses. Max then saves 99, who was sprayed with the plastic solution, by taking her to a steam bath. Alice Reinheart as Hilda. Tim Herbert as Attendant.
30	30	"The Last One in Is a Rotten Spy"	David Alexander	Stan Burns and Mike Marmer	May 7, 1966	030
Max is contacted by a member of the Russian swim team who has a list of KAOS agents and wants to use the list to defect. She gives Max her name and tells him to meet her at the International Sports Club. Max, 99 and Chief go to the club. Unfortunately, Max can't remember the woman's name. Chief asks the four Russian woman swimmers their names. None of them sound familiar to Max. Greco (John Milford) is suspicious and asks who they are. 99 says she is the American team's chaperone and Max says he is a trainer. Max is contacted by the woman again. When she gives the signal, the list will be in the pool. 99 sees the signal and Chief tells Max to get in the pool. Max finds a bottle, but there is nothing in it. Max finds a note in his sandwich, but he ate half of it. Greco tells Verna (Alice Ghostley), the women's trainer, that he will have to eliminate Max. Verna is the one who contacted Max, but Max does not know that. She calls and tells Max where to meet her. Max gets a note handed to him from a bush. Greco arrives and tries to get the note, but Max eats it. Max over powers him. Max goes to see the women swimmers and runs into Verna. He does not know it, but she slipped the note into his pocket. Max does learn it was Verna and they have to run from Greco. Max kills Greco. Victoria Carroll as Myrna.

=== Season 2 (1966–67) ===
The second season of Get Smart aired on Saturday nights following Please Don't Eat the Daisies and opposite The Lawrence Welk Show (ABC) and Pistols 'n' Petticoats (CBS).

No. overall	No. in season	Title	Directed by	Written by	Original release date	Prod. code
31	1	"Anatomy of a Lover"	Bruce Bilson	Gary Clarke	September 17, 1966	035
KAOS reprograms CONTROL robot Hymie (Dick Gautier) to murder the Chief. After completing the mission, Hymie's memory bank will be erased. Hymie breaks into Chief's office and starts to strangle him. Max and 99 show up and Max is able to short circuit Hymie. Chief wants Max to disassemble Hymie. Instead, Max hides Hymie in his apartment and he is to say he is Max's cousin. At the apartment, neighbor Phoebe (Laurel Goodwin) meets Hymie. Max leads Chief to believe Hymie is disassembled. Max tells Hymie that there must be a spy at CONTROL. Phoebe comes by again and Max tells Hymie that she is the Chief's niece. Kirsch (King Moody) arrives and tells Max the Chief wants to see him. Chief tells Max that he knows Hymie has not been disassembled. At the apartment, Hymie is once again reprogrammed. This time he is to kill Max in a restaurant. Hymie calls Max and says he wants to go out and he invited Phoebe. At the restaurant, 99 tells Max that Phoebe is falling for Hymie. Phoebe tells Max that she is in love with Hymie. Hymie's attempt to shoot Max goes wrong. At the apartment, Kirsch is revealed to be the KAOS spy. Hymie knocks Kirsch out.
32	2	"Strike While the Agent Is Hot"	Gary Nelson	Budd Grossman	September 24, 1966	033
At the airport, Max makes contact with Agent 47. KAOS is smuggling counterfeit money into the country to finance their operations. 47 is shot several times. Before he dies, he makes Max the head labor negotiator with CONTROL. 47 also gives Max a puzzling clue as to where KAOS hides the money. Max is holding a labor meeting with hidden CONTROL agents. Chief comes by and Max tells him some of their demands or they will go on strike at midnight. In Chief's office, Max and 99 try to figure out the clue 47 gave. 99 suggests that the clue is the name of a children's book. Chief sends Max to the bookstore and he speaks with Madame Verna. Believing Max is a KAOS agant, she gives him the book and tells him to read page 52. At CONTROL, they can't decipher the code. Max reminds Chief about the strike. Max goes back to the bookstore and Verna gives him a different book. As Max is leaving, KAOS Agent #2 (Alan Dexter) comes in and tells Verna that was Maxwell Smart. They need to get the book back and kill Max. Agent #2 confronts Max in his apartment. He tells Max what the clue means before he accidentally shoots himself. Chief and Max learn the location of the counterfeit money and Max gets Chief to agree to the labor demands. Robert Karvelas as KAOS Agent.
33	3	"A Spy for a Spy"	Bruce Bilson	Mike Marmer and Stan Burns	October 1, 1966	031
Max and 99 have taken Chief out for his birthday. Siegfried (Bernie Kopell, in his first appearance in this recurring role), KAOS Vice President of Public Relations and Terror, kills the magician and fills in. Siegfried gets Chief to come up on stage for a magic trick. After a puff of smoke, both Chief and Siegfried are gone. Max finds a note stating Chief has been kidnapped. At CONTROL, Max tells Standish and Professor Carlson (Stacy Keach Sr.) that they have every available agent looking for Chief. They try to figure out who will be in charge until Chief returns. Siegfried calls and tells Max that he will return Chief, but there is something he wants in exchange. Siegfried wants to meet with Max in the park. Siegfried says he wants the X11, the country's latest defense device. At their next meeting, Max and Siegfried exchange fake items. Max retaliates by kidnapping KAOS's top assassin, Carl Danker (James Lanphier). After this, a war of kidnappings takes place. It culminates in Max and Siegfried being the only ones who haven't been kidnapped. They exchange Chief and Danker. They then exchange the other agents. Robert Karvelas as Restaurant Patron.
34	4	"The Only Way to Die"	Bruce Bilson	Arne Sultan	October 8, 1966	032
KAOS agents Christopher (Alex Hassilev) and Stromberg (Harry Basch) discuss how "The Blaster" is going to blow up the IRS building. The Blaster will arrive in the next 48 hours and destroy the building in a week. They discover they are being bugged and find Max nearby. Max tries to run away and is shot. Chief and 99 are at Max's gravesite. Chief assigns 99 to guard Antonio Carioca (Edmund Hashim). Only Chief knows that Max is actually alive. Max can now use the information he heard to track down The Blaster. If KAOS thinks Max is alive, they will change their plans. Chief tells Max to stay out of sight. He will have Agent 13 (David Ketchum) watch Max. Max tells Chief that it is suspicious that every time Blaster destroys a building, Carioca comes to town. After seeing something on TV, Max calls CONTROL and speaks with Hobson (Gordon Jump). Max wants him to tell Chief that Blaster is on Carioca's yacht. Hobson thinks it is a phony phone call because Max is dead. Meanwhile, Carioca wonders why 99 has been so sad lately. Max, disguised, shows up and calls Carioca the Blaster. Realizing it is Max, 99 faints and Carioca grabs Max's gun. Carioca says he has already planted the bomb in the IRS building. He can detonate it from the yacht. Max is able to prevent Carioca from setting off the bomb. Carioca and Christopher accidentally shoot each other. Robert Karvelas as Control Agent. Arthur Tovey as Minister.
35	5	"Maxwell Smart, Alias Jimmy Ballantine"	Gary Nelson	Arnie Rosen	October 15, 1966	034
Max and 99 are in a car outside of Dobring's barber shop. Max calls Chief, who says they believe the shop is a KAOS front. The man they suspect of being Mr. K, the top financial genious of KAOS, has been seen going into the shop. An armoured truck pulls up and Chief thinks they could be transferring money. The truck starts firing on Max's car. Max has to impersonate a safe cracker named Jimmy Ballantine (Tim Herbert), a soon to be released convict. CONTROL will make KAOS believe Ballantine's face was burned, allowing Max to have his face wrapped in bandages so KAOS will not recognize him. Chief and Max see the Warden (Steve Pendleton) and then meet Ballantine. Ballantine gives Max some tips on safecracking, but it does not go well. Max goes to the Barber shop, where Dobring (Howard Morton) and Popov (Vic Tayback) are. 99 poses as a manicurist and Agent 13 is in the towel steamer. 13 tells Max that KAOS needs Ballantine for a big job. The KAOS agents want Max to open the vault of a federal reserve bank. 99 doesn't know which one, so the Chief has all the banks vaults left unlocked. Max opens the vault and Dobring starts removing the money. Popov is to kill Max, but winds up getting shot himself. Chief and 99 arrive and capture Dobring. Max accidentally locks the Chief in the vault. Robert Karvelas as Armored Truck Guard. Note: A spoof of Alias Jimmy Valentine.
36	6	"Casablanca"	William Wiard	Joseph C. Cavella and Carol Cavella	October 22, 1966	037
Max is at the airport guarding Dr. Pliny. While Max is calling Chief, Dr. Pliny is strangled. Back at CONTROL, Chief tells Max it was clearly the work of the Choker. Choker has killed 375 top scientists. Hobson says that he has Bubinski, a Cab Driver, who may have witnessed the Choker. Turns out the man Bubinski saw was Max. Chief tells Max that the plane that left after Pliny was killed flew to Casablanca. He is sure Choker was on it. Chief orders Max to go on a two week vacation. Chief disguises 99 and will send her to Casablanca. They do not know it, but Max goes to Casablanca as well. In Casablanca, 99 is performing in a night club. Max goes to the club, but does not recognize 99. 99 calls Chief and says there is a man there that looks like Max. Chief says that Max is in Canada. 99 wonders if that man could be the Choker. She tells Max to meet her in her dressing room. They both realize who they are. Just then the Choker starts to strangle Max. After Max falls to the ground, the Choker goes after 99. Max gets up and shoots Choker. Nick Dimitri as Nightclub Patron. Paul Frees as Greenstreet Character (voice). Robert Karvelas as Control Agent. Note: This episode is notable for the impression done by Don Adams of Humphrey Bogart, as well as the two songs performed by Feldon, "There'll Be Some Changes Made" and Édith Piaf's well-known French chanson "La vie en rose".
37	7	"The Decoy"	William Wiard	Sydney Zelinka and Ronald Axe	October 29, 1966	041
Chief tells some agents that KAOS has cracked CONTROL's universal code. All communications will have to stop until a new code can be delivered to their communications center in Greenland. Agent X will deliver the code. They will also send out a decoy agent that will probably be captured by KAOS. Max is chosen to be the decoy. Carlson prepares Max for possible KAOS torture. Hugo, the newsstand operator, turns out to be a KAOS agent and captures Max. KAOS Agents Kimmel and Luden (Len Lesser) question Max, but he will not answer. Greta tries to seduce Max, but that does not work. Seidlitz (John McLiam) gives Max a truth serum. Meanwhile, Chief learns that Agent X made it safely to Greenland. 99 wants to find Max. The truth serum does not work. Kimmel learns that Max was a decoy. Kimmel and Seidlitz wind up shot and Max over powers Luden. Chief, 99 and some other agents arrive.
38	8	"Hoo Done It"	Gary Nelson	Gerald Gardner and Dee Caruso	November 5, 1966	039
Max and 99 are in Hawaii on a secret mission. They are to meet Colonel Roger Forsythe of the British Black Watch. He has information about a KAOS plot. They meet Hillary Conrad (Anthony Eustrel), the owner of the hotel. They then see Forsythe get shot and killed. Harry Hoo arrives. 99 goes to check the grounds. Harry and Max question the four suspects, The Contessa (Maureen Arthur), Otto Von Werner (Tol Avery), Omar Shurok and Ben Gazzman. 99 tells Max that all the ships to the mainland are gone and the telephone lines have been cut. A storm is coming and Max sends 99 on a raft to the mainland. Harry tells Max that Gazzman is his prime suspect, but they find him dead. Harry comes up with a plan. Max is to tell the guests that he will reveal the murderer tomorrow. The person will then try to kill Max and they will catch him. Omar comes into the room. Harry and Max learn that they are in Omar's room. Otto is poisoned. The Contessa and Omar are then killed. Harry discovers that each of the guests were KAOS agents. Turns out that Conrad was the murderer and 99 kills him. Notes: This is a parody of Agatha Christie's Ten Little Indians. One of the suspects is named "Ben Gazzman", and says he is an adventurer living life at most since he has two years to live, a spoof of the Run for Your Life series that starred Ben Gazzara. This episode marks the last appearance of Harry Hoo, however Joey Forman would appear in a season 3 episode playing a different character.
39	9	"Rub-a-Dub-Dub... Three Spies in a Sub"	Bruce Bilson	Mike Marmer and Stan Burns	November 12, 1966	040
Max and 99 are on an island and he can not get the envelope with their mission details open. Suddenly the two are shot. Chief comes by and tells them that this was a training exercise. Tomorrow they are to go on the real mission and they clearly are not ready. Back at CONTROL Chief tells Max and 99 that cargo ships have been hijacked by KAOS using submarines. The KAOS base is on an island nearby and has a master computer. Their very dangerous mission is to destroy the computer. Max and 99 board a sub and meet the Skipper (William Boyett). Once on the island, Max and 99 are captured. They manage to kill the KAOS agents. Max and 99 blow up the computer. They go back to the wrong sub and are captured by Siegfried. Siegfried informs CONTROL that he has Max and 99, figuring they will not fire on the sub. Despite having Max and 99 killed, Chief gives the order to sink the sub. Destroyers drop depth charges near the sub. Max and 99 try to talk the crew into mutiny, but it does not work. Max finds a way to turn the tables on Siegfried. Back at CONTROL, Max learns that Chief did not believe he would survive and assigned the number 86 to another agent. Max is also told that Siegfried escaped. Eddie Hice as Krueger. Robert Karvelas as Larabee.
40	10	"The Greatest Spy on Earth"	Joshua Shelley	Gerald Gardner and Dee Caruso	November 19, 1966	038
Max and 99 are to meet Agent 51 (Gordon Jump) at the Farnum and Daley Circus. 51 shows up in a gorilla suit. He is about to tell them something when a knife is thrown into his back and he dies. Back at CONTROL Chief tells Max that KAOS is using the circus as a smuggling ring. Everywhere the circus goes, supplies of industrial diamonds are depleted. Chief wants Max and 99 to go back to the circus undercover as reporters for a circus world magazine. At the circus they meet Hanlon (Paul Dooley), press agent of the circus. Max mentions the five fatal accidents in the last six months at the circus. They would like to speak with Raymond the Magnificent (Victor Lundin), the knife thrower. Tiny Allen (Billy Curtis) tells Max and 99 that he has some information about the accidents and diamonds. Tiny does not want Raymond to see them talking, so they should meet him in his trailer later. Max and 99 then speak with half man/half woman Gertrude/Gerald (Mickey Manners) and mention diamonds. They go to Tiny's trailer and find him dead. They then speak with strongman Hondo. Max is almost struck by two knives. Max calls Chief and tells him they have not found the diamonds. Max and 99 are captured by Hanlon and the others. Hanlon says they will be killed during tonight's performance. Max and 99 free themselves, find the diamonds, but are captured again. Chief and two agents arrive dressed as clowns and free Max and 99.
41	11	"Island of the Darned"	Gary Nelson	Story by : William Raynor and Myles Wilder; Teleplay by : Buck Henry and William Raynor and Myles Wilder	November 26, 1966	044
At CONTROL, Chief tells Max and 99 that it has been 3 months since they have received a message from Agent 27. 27 was on the trail of man-hunting sociopath Hans Hunter (Harold Gould). A crate is delivered to Chief's office and it has the stuffed body of 27 inside. They discover it came from a Caribbean island. Max and 99 are sent to the KAOS-controlled island. After wandering around for hours, they are captured by Hunter. Hunter tells them that he will send them into the jungle and then hunt them down. The next day Hunter tells them he will give them a one hour head start. If they can elude him until sun down, they can go free. Hunter gives Max a knife. Max and 99 dig a pit and put stakes in it. One of Hunter's men fall in and is killed. Max and 99 come to a rope suspension bridge over a deep gorge. They have to go part of the way by hand, but they make it to the other side. It is five minutes to sun down. Hunter is there and offers to spare 99's life if see stays with him. She turns him down. They are able to kill Hunter. Note: The episode is a spoof of The Most Dangerous Game.
42	12	"Bronzefinger"	William Wiard	Lila Garrett and Bernie Kahn	December 3, 1966	042
Max and 99 are decorating Max's apartment for Agent 54's (Robert Patten) surprise birthday party. Agent 54 arrives painted completely blue and dies. At CONTROL Chief asks Max if 54 said anything about Rembrandt von Bronzefinger. KAOS has been running an art forgery ring. They have been selling the originals behind the Iron Curtain to help fund their operation. Chief says they need to find Bronzefinger, who is working somewhere in the museum. Van Cleff (Joseph Sirola) will pick an agent to pose as an artist. Because Max annoys Van Cleff, he picks Max for the dangerous assignment. 99 poses as a guide in the museum. Van Cleff introduces Max to Wolfgang (Richard Karlan), Emile (John Bliss) and Victoria, art restorers. The three are suspects. 99 tells Max that Agent 13 says KAOS will smuggle out another artwork that evening. Max finds Emile dead and Victoria painted bronze and dead. Wolfgang enters the room and is shot in the back. Turns out that Van Cleff is Bronzefinger. He killed the three KAOS agents because they were going to tell Max the truth. Bronzefinger captures Max and 99 and will coat them in bronze. They escape before the bronze is poured. Bronzefinger arrives and battles with Max. Bronzefinger falls into the pit of bronze. Note: A spoof of Goldfinger.
43	13	"Perils in a Pet Shop"	Bruce Bilson	Martin A. Ragaway	December 10, 1966	045
Max and 99 are following a KAOS Agent who is smuggling a parrot. They exchange gunfire. The Agent tries to shoot the bird, but is out of ammo. The Agent escapes, but leaves the bird. Back at CONTROL, 99 tells Chief that the agent was Kosovich (Johnny Seven). Creevley (Dick Wilson), who is with an agency that prevents cruelty to birds, arrives. Creevley, as the bird's lawyer, has a paper that allows him to take the bird. Chief has Max follow the parrot to Kilmen's pet shop. Max and Chief learn that the pet shop is a KAOS front run by Melnik, the Smiling Killer (Donald Murphy). While trying to break into the pet shop after hours, Max, 99, and Fang the dog are captured. Melnik reveals that the parrots are being used to memorize secret information and then smuggled out of the country. Melnik orders Kosovich to tranquilize Fang and then kill Max and 99. 99 starts seducing Kosovich and gets his weapon. Kosovich still has his tranquilizer and shoots Max, but Kosovich gets tranquilized as well. Max and Kosovich are fighting in slow motion. Melnik returns and grabs the weapon from 99. Chief and two CONTROL agents arrive and subdue Melnik. Leonard Bremen as Newsdealer. Note: This is Fang's final appearance on the series.
44	14	"The Whole Tooth and..."	William Wiard	Lila Garrett and Bernie Kahn	December 24, 1966	043
99 tells Max that KAOS sabotaged a nuclear reactor in the midwest and it is running wild. They have 72 hours before there is a nuclear explosion. Max will wear a cap on his tooth that holds the microfilm plans of the reactor. Max and 99 will pose as a newlywed couple and go to Chicago. At the train station, two KAOS agents confront Max and 99. Max removes the cap and hides the plans in the mouth of an unsuspecting stranger, Franco (Robert Strauss). Franco turns out to be a convict headed for Joliet Penitentiary. Max tries to get arrested by not paying a check at a restaurant. Manager Schulman (Stuart Nisbet) and the Waiter (Joseph Mell) feel sorry for Max and collect money for him. Max then tries robbing a man on the street. The man turns out to be Dr. Rhinehouse (John Alvin), a psychiatrist. Rhinehouse gives Max his card and tells him to come for a consultation. Max finally gets a policeman to arrest him. The Judge (Howard Wendell) wants to let Max off with a warning. Max insults the Judge and gets sent to the Penitentiary. Max manages to get to Franco's cell. Max learns that Franco wears dentures and is able to get the cap. Robert Karvelas as Man in Train Station.
45	15	"Kiss of Death"	Bruce Bilson	Stan Burns and Mike Marmer	December 31, 1966	036
Max is at an outdoor restaurant. Two cars pull up and some men try to abduct a woman in one of the cars. Max gets involved and the woman is freed. She thanks Max and tells him that these kidnap attempts happen all the time. Her chauffeur then drives off. At CONTROL, Max tells Chief that one of the men trying to kidnap the woman was a KAOS man. The woman is having a party at her place. Victor Slade (Larry D. Mann) and Kane (Gil Perkins) come to see her. Victor is Head of KAOS in the area. He is not happy about her fake kidnap attempt. The woman turns out to be Tracy Dunhill (Geraldine Brooks). She is a rich socialite and head of "Daughters of KAOS". Max had killed her father, a KAOS operative, a year earlier. She intends to kill Max that night. Tracy arrives at Max's apartment, flirts with him and invites him to her place. Tracy tells Victor she will have poison on her lips and kiss Max. 99 tells Chief they should crash Tracy's party. Max arrives at the party and 99 and Chief arrive not long after. At midnight, Tracy kisses Max and he drops. But he was only faking. Because of a tip from Agent 13, who is also there, Max put on plastic lips to protect himself. Robert Banas as Little Joe. Bill Hickman as KAOS Agent. Robert Karvelas as Control Agent. Cosmo Sardo as Party Guest.
46	16	"It Takes One to Know One"	Earl Bellamy	Gary Clarke	January 7, 1967	046
Max calls Chief and tells him that he followed Agent Walters out of a bar. Walters is about to kill himself by jumping off a bridge. He tells Max that he ruined his position as Number Two Man of CONTROL because of KAOS agent Octavia (Gayle Hunnicutt). Back at CONTROL, Chief tells Max that Walters is the third Number Two Man to die. Hymie is to be the new Number Two Man. Chief figures that as a robot, Hymie would be immune to Octavia's evil charms. Unfortunately, Hymie has to pass a physical with Dr. Pasteur (Woodrow Parfrey). Max has to keep Pasteur from finding out that Hymie is a robot. Octavia is told there is a new Number Two Man and KAOS wants him brought back alive. Hymie is reprogrammed to be cold and uncaring. Octavia gets into Hymie's office dressed as a cleaning woman. Hymie tells her he knows who she is and she is finally caught. Octavia kisses Hymie and he starts overheating. Max and Chief find Octavia and Hymie gone. Hymie and Octavia are in Max's apartment getting some files. Hymie is falling for Octavia as it turns out she is a Gynoid. Max and Chief arrive and put Octavia in a force field to stop her. Hymie frees her and puts Max and Chief in the force field. Octavia wants to be with Hymie, but she knows she can not. Octavia destroys herself. Hymie rebuilds Octavia, but she now has Max's voice.
47	17	"Someone Down Here Hates Me"	Earl Bellamy	Nate Monaster	January 14, 1967	047
A couple of failed attempts on Max's life have happened. Max learns from a KAOS hood that there is a huge reward to kill him. At KAOS, Siegfried is upset that in the last three weeks Max has eliminated eleven of their agents. If Max is not killed in the next 48 hours, the KAOS annual party will be canceled. Max and 99 are out on the street when a car drives by and shoots at them, but misses. They find Agent 13 in a ice vending machine, but he has no information for them. Max is becoming very edgy and suspects everyone. Chief tells Max that he needs a rest and should get out of town. He also mentions that they have doubled the reward. Max and 99 are at his apartment. A man comes by claiming to be Joe Froebus, Agent 63. He does not look like Joe. Joe claims that Dr. Noodelman performed plastic surgery on him after the train wreck he was in. Max goes to see Dr. Noodelman. Max asks him if he knows any plastic surgeons who might be working for KAOS. While Max is in another room, Noodelman calls KAOS and asks if the reward is still there. Just as Noodelman is about to kill Max, Chief shows up and shoots him.
48	18	"Cutback at CONTROL"	Earl Bellamy	Gerald Gardner and Dee Caruso	January 21, 1967	048
Perkins, from accounting, is with Max on a stakeout. Perkins is there because of a new directive on economy. KAOS agent Eric Krueger comes out of a building and Max shoots him. Perkins is upset because Max used four bullets. At CONTROL, Chief tells Max about all the cutbacks they have to make. Max and Chief plead their case to a Senate sub-committee, that is threatening to shut down CONTROL. Siegfried invites Max to become an agent for KAOS. Chief thinks that if Max could infiltrate KAOS, he might be able to uncover a KAOS man that is high in the government. That would prove how valuable CONTROL is. Max meets with Siegfried and is told he must go through a training class. Later, Max is able to drug Siegfried. Max also learns that KAOS knows he is not defecting and they wanted Siegfried to kill him. Max is able to expose Dietrich (Harry Bartell), one of the men on the sub-committee, as a KAOS agent.
49	19	"The Man from YENTA"	Bruce Bilson	Arne Sultan	January 28, 1967	051
Chief and Max go to Arab Prince Abu bin Bubi's (Walker Edmiston) hotel suite. Max is assigned to protect the Prince and his wives. Chief says there are factions in the Prince's country that would like to break his oil contract with the US. They want to send the oil to Iron Curtain countries. Room Service brings the Prince his lunch. The waiter lights the candles, but one is dynamite, which Max disposes of. At CONTROL, Chief tells Max that they learned one of the Prince's wives is a KAOS agent. 99 comes in dressed as a Harem girl. She will try to find out which wife is the agent. Chief tells Max that he will be working with Israeli agent 498 (Alan Oppenheimer) from YENTA. Chief learns that Le Moco (Paul Comi), KAOS' top assassin, has been assigned to kill the Prince. Max meets 498 at the airport, but somehow they miss Le Moco. Max impersonates the Prince. Max mistakes three other CONTROL agents for assassins. Le Moco knocks out Max, shoots him and leaves. Max was wearing protection so he is fine. Max tells a Harem girl he thinks is 99 that Le Moco left thinking he killed the Prince, but she is the KAOS agent. The Prince is safe with 498. Le Moco finds 498 and the Prince and Max shows up. Things get confusing because they are all dressed as the Prince and Chief shows up. Max does manage to kill Le Moco. Note: Working title: "He Should Live and Be Well".
50	20	"The Mummy"	Earl Bellamy	Budd Grossman	February 4, 1967	049
Max tells Agent 24 that he finds nothing suspicious about the museum they are in. 24 mentions the anonymous tip that the museum is tied in with the mysterious disappearance of four CONTROL agents. A man comes up behind 24, knocks him out and drags him away, without Max noticing. Back at CONTROL, Chief wonders why they have not heard from 24. Chief mentions that three mummies have arrived at the museum lately. When one arrived, an Agent went missing. Chief sends Max back to the museum and tells him Agent 13 is there as well. 13 tells Max to keep an eye on Dr. Ramsey (Laurie Main). Lisa Smith (Lisa Gaye), an assistant curator, recognizes Max. She feels something strange is going on there. Turns out Dr. Ramsey is smuggling KAOS agents in and sending CONTROL agents out in mummy cases. Lisa calls Max and wants to meet with him. Max does not know that Lisa is working with Dr. Ramsey. That night, Lisa arrives at Max's apartment. Max and Lisa each drop a pill in each other's drink, but the drinks are switched. Lisa winds up knocked out and Max drank a truth pill. Later, Max is captured and brought to Dr. Ramsey. He is wrapped up as a mummy and put in a coffin. He will be shipped to KAOS in Europe. Chief goes to the museum and finds Max. Things get complicated, but Chief and 13 capture Lisa and Ramsey.
51	21	"The Girls from KAOS"	William Wiard	Joseph and Carol Cavella	February 11, 1967	050
It is late at night and a young woman comes to Max's door. She says help me and passes out. When she comes to, she claims to be Miss USA (Tisha Sterling) and says her name is Tisha. Tisha says that her father told her to come to Max if she needed help. Her father, Herman Heinschimdt, is an important American scientist. The next day, Tisha is taken to CONTROL. As her life may be in danger, Chief thinks she should withdraw from the next competition. Chief thinks that one of the contestants is a KAOS plant. Max is to try to get a photo of each of the girls. At the hotel, the Transmanian Chaperone (Sidney Clute) tells Miss Transmania that he recognized Maxwell Smart. The Chaperone says they must kill Max. That night at a party for the girls, Miss Transmania flirts with Max. A man tries to push Max out a window, but he falls out instead. Max brings the pictures to Carlson to be processed. Chief says that Miss Transmania and her Chaperone, Dimitri Socaloff, are the KAOS agents. Back at the hotel, Tisha has been abducted. Max overpowers Dimitri and is about to free Tisha. Miss Formosa, also a KAOS agent, comes in the room and knocks out Max. She then shoots Miss Transmania and Dimitri. Before Miss Formosa can shoot Max, Dimitri shoots her. George DeNormand as Party Guest. Eddie Hice as Waiter. Note: Working title: "The Girl From KAOS".
52	22	"Smart Fit the Battle of Jericho"	Bruce Bilson	Arne Sultan	February 18, 1967	052
Max and 99 are at a high-rise construction site. 99 says that Agent 77 is on top posing as a building inspector. 99 is worried because Frank Lloyd Joshua, the owner of Jerico Construction, is up there as well. Joshua knows all the local building inspectors. Max calls Chief and learns that three buildings that Jericho put up mysteriously exploded. They need to find out how KAOS is blowing them up. One of Joshua's men make 77 fall off the building, looking like an accident. Back at CONTROL, Chief believes Joshua is with KAOS. Chief wants Max to investigate Joshua and Baron von Kruppa, who owns an explosives company. The two will be meeting in Las Vegas. At the Vegas hotel, Max loses the transmitter he was to use to record Joshua and von Kruppa's conversation. The transmitter does wind up on Joshua's table. Joshua suspects Max and has one of his men (Louis Quinn) take Max outside. Just before the man is to shoot Max, the Cigarette Girl (Angelique Pettyjohn) knocks the man out. The girl claims to be CONTROL agent Charlie Watkins in disguise. Chief tells Max that he got Max a job with Jericho. On the construction site, Max discovers many of the bricks are hollow. Joshua's man Carlos (Steve Gravers) confronts Max. After they battle, Carlos falls from the building. Joshua admits to Max that the bricks will hold Nitroglycerin. Max overpowers Joshua. Note: This episode introduces CONTROL agent Charlie Watkins.
53	23	"Where-What-How-Who Am I?"	Gary Nelson	Barry E. Blitzer and Ray Brenner	February 25, 1967	053
Three KAOS agents are meeting in a hotel room. Max is listening in. Schnell tells the others that tomorrow afternoon, at Jet Space Laboratory, a group of America's top space scientists will be blown up. Petroff wants to know how they will get past security. Max calls Chief. Schnell learns that Max is in the next room. While trying to escape, Max crashes his car into a wall. Max wakes up in the hospital and tells the Nurse he wants to leave. Dr. Mangle (George N. Neise) and the Nurse are working with KAOS. Dr. Mangle learns that Chief and 99 are coming to see Max. He gives Max an amnesia pill, which will last one hour. Chief and 99 arrive and want to take Max to CONTROL. Dr. Mangle tells them that Max must take a pill every hour. At CONTROL, Max starts to remember things, but then 99 gives him another pill. Chief gives Max a new car and he and 99 go to the hotel. Max starts to remember the plot to kill the scientists with a bomb in a snack truck. Before Max can tell 99 where this will happen, she gives him another pill. 99 realizes that Max had recorded Schnell and she now knows where the scientists will meet. They are able to save the scientists and capture Schenell and Petroff. Note: Working title: "The New Car".
54	24	"The Expendable Agent"	Gary Nelson	Gerald Gardner and Dee Caruso	March 4, 1967	055
Max and 99 are at the airport to pick up British scientist Prof. Whitaker. 99 wonders why Whitaker has to transmit his new rocket fuel formula to the American scientists verbally. Max says that so many countries want the formula, there can not be a paper trail. British Agent Alex Chain is with Whitaker to protect him. Whitaker arrives and an unsuccessful attempt to capture him is made. Chief wants Whitaker to stay at Max's apartment. Meanwhile, a KAOS Chief (Herb Ellis) explains to other agents the financial importance of capturing Whitaker. Max explains to Whitaker and Chain all the safety devices in his apartment. KAOS Chief says there is a bomb in Max's place that will kill Max and Chain. He sets it off remotely to explode in five minutes. Max and Chain find the bomb and disable it. Later KAOS Chief says that Whitaker is at CONTROL and about to reveal the formula. They must draw him out and kill him. Whitaker receives a message supposedly from his daughter, who is eloping and wants to meet him at the airport. Whitaker leaves the meeting with the scientists and Max and 99 go with him. Whitaker thinks he sees Cynthia and the girl shoots him. Max tackles the girl. Chief says that Whitaker will live. It turns out that Chain was the actual scientist and Whitaker was the expendable agent.
55	25	"How to Succeed in the Spy Business Without Really Trying"	Gary Nelson	Mike Marmer	March 11, 1967	054
Following an anonymous tip, Max and 99 are in a KAOS warehouse. Agent 74 arrives to help. A KAOS agent shows up and shoots 74. Just as he is about to shoot Max, the agent is shot by Siegfried. Siegfried claims he is leaving KAOS and is willing to cooperate with CONTROL. Back at CONTROL, Chief is skeptical, but will meet with Siegfried. They all meet at the warehouse. Siegfried says he has information to sell. An agent is about to shoot Chief, but Siegfried kills him. Max says they will check out some of Siegfried's info and meet at Max's apartment. After they leave, the agent gets up because it was all staged. Back at KAOS, Siegfried discusses his plan with his assistant Shtarker. Later, Max, 99 and Chief come to Max's apartment and find Siegfried apparently dead. A tape recording has Shtarker asking Siegfried if he told Max about Operation Big K. There is then a gun shot. Siegfried gets up because the bullet supposedly only grazed him. He tells them about the KAOS plan to rob Fort Knox. Actually while all the CONTROL agents are guarding Fort Knox, the real plan is to capture all the CONTROL Chiefs at an award ceremony. They will be held for ransom. At the ceremony Siegfried uses gas pellets to knock everyone out. Max was not really knocked out and prevents Siegfried's plan. Nancy Walters as Dr. Hans Svenson. Eddie Hice as Blindfolded Accountant. Alex Rocco as KAOS Killer. Note: This is the first episode featuring King Moody as Siegfried's inept assistant Shtarker. The episode is a spoof of How to Succeed in Business Without Really Trying.
56	26	"Appointment in Sahara"	Don Adams	Gary Clarke and Arne Sultan	March 25, 1967	056
Chief tells Max and 99 that KAOS has nuclear bombs. They will prove it in 72 hours if they do not get what they want. They will blow up one of America's largest cities. KAOS wants the total disarmament of every nuclear nation in the world. Chief gets a lead to the whereabouts of the bombs and sends Max and 99 to the Sahara desert. In the desert, Max and 99 meet up with agent Forsythe. Forsythe says that Hassein will guide them to the missle base. As they are walking, shots are fired and Forsythe is killed. A sandstorm starts. By the time it is over, Max is almost completely buried. They find Hassein dead. After walking a long time, Max and 99 are exhausted and collapse. They are found by Jamal (Vic Tayback) and Ahmad (Peter Mamakos). What Max and 99 do not know is that the men are with KAOS. Ahmad hopes to convince them that there is no missle base in the desert. While dining with the men, Max finds a message saying the missles are under Ahmad's daughter's tent. Max goes to Fatima's tent and battles with a man there. The man is killed and Max is captured by Jamal. Max and 99 are tied to the ground and left to die. Fatima frees them. She is not Ahmad's daughter, she was his slave. Max is able to destroy the missle base.
57	27	"Pussycats Galore"	Sidney Miller	Arne Sultan	April 1, 1967	057
Max enters his apartment and is surprised to find a woman there. She claims to be a pussycat from the Pussycat Club. She says that she waited on Austrian scientist Herbert von Solo at the club and suddenly he was gone. After she leaves, Max sees she is abducted by two men. Chief tells Max and 99 that scientists have gone missing from various cities that have Pussycat Clubs. 99 wonders if Frank Valentine (H.M. Wynant), owner of the clubs, is working for KAOS. To infiltrate the club, the Chief assigns Max and 99 to go undercover as two married German scientists, Fritz and Greta Braun. Chief says that agent Charlie Watkins will pose as a pussycat. At their hotel room, Max gets a call from Hans Frome (Ted Knight), who claims to be with the German Embassy. Hans would like to take Fritz and Greta to dinner. Hans is working with Valentine, who wants to make sure they are who they say they are. If they are not, Valentine wants Hans to kill them. Max and 99 are suspicious of Hans because he asked them a lot of questions. At the club, Hans tells Valentine he believes the Brauns are legit. Tranquilizers are put in the Braun's drinks. Max and 99 run into Charlie Watkins. Max asks him to have Chief run a check on Hans. Charlie comes back and says that there is no Hans Frome at the embassy. Charlie realizes that Max and 99 are catatonic. Valentine captures Charlie and puts him in the freezer. Max and 99 are taken outside. Turns out Max did not drink his drink and he draws his gun on Valentine and Hans. Chief and a couple agents arrive and Valentine and Hans wind up shot. Note: Working title: "The Disappearances".
58	28	"A Man Called Smart: Part 1"	Earl Bellamy	Leonard Stern	April 8, 1967	058
At CONTROL, Dr. Smith tells Chief, Max and 99 about DRY-UP, a water evaporation formula. It could eradicate the water supply of the United States. Max makes contact with an informant and they set up a meeting at a hotel. The informant is about to tell Max who stole the formula, when he is shot. The man is still alive and Max recognizes him as Russell Bediyoskin, a famous movie actor. Just then Max and Chief see on TV a KAOS agent demanding one billion dollars or they will unleash DRY-UP. The Hotel Doctor arrives to care for Bediyoskin. A friend of Bediyoskin's, actor Otto Hurrah (John Myhers), comes by. Otto says that Bediyoskin is a gambler that always loses and is on the edge of ruin. 99 says that the Hotel Doctor is a woman not a man. Max stops the imposter from injecting Bediyoskin with something. They rush Bediyoskin to a hospital and Chief uses Max as a decoy. Two paramedics put Max in an ambulance and one of them draws a gun on him. A policeman appoaches and the men drive off. Max's cot falls out the back and rolls down the street. Shep Houghton as Hotel Guest. James Lanphier as KAOS Agent. Notes: Howard Caine (also known as Major Hochstetter of Hogan's Heroes) plays two roles as CONTROL scientist Dr. Smith and as flamboyant impresario/KAOS agent Russell Bediyoskin, aka "The Big One". This and the other two parts were supposed to be a feature film released by Paramount, but after the box office failure of the film Munster Go Home, it became a three-part episode instead.
59	29	"A Man Called Smart: Part 2"	Earl Bellamy	Leonard Stern	April 15, 1967	059
Max is on his cot rolling down the street. He winds up in an open manhole. At CONTROL, Chief tells Max that Bediyoskin is safe at the hospital, but still unconscious. The President calls and tells Chief he is being temporarily replaced. CONTROL's first chief, 91-year-old Admiral Harold Hardgrade (William Schallert), will be filling in. Hardgrade arrives and he is very frail. He winds up falling asleep. 99 calls from Bediyoskin's hotel room, where she is searching for clues. When she stops talking, Max and Chief go to the hotel and find she has been captured. Chief has a plan. Max will get captured and Chief will follow. A KAOS Girl (Marj Dusay) leads Max to a car and he is taken away. Chief gets locked in a room and can not follow them. The KAOS Girl, Max and other agents switch cars several times. They wind up back at the hotel. Chief finally gets free and captures the girl. They find 99 and are able to free her. Back at CONTROL, they watch on TV the KAOS agent saying they will demonstrate the power of DRY-UP on some small bodies of water. Max and Chief learn that Bediyoskin is actually Dr. Waldo Smith's brother. Max, Chief and 99 go to the hospital. KAOS is there and Chief is wounded. Maxine Stuart as Nurse #1.
60	30	"A Man Called Smart: Part 3"	Earl Bellamy	Leonard Stern	April 22, 1967	060
The Chief is in critical condition in the hospital. Admiral Hargrade comes by and Max shows him a note that Bediyoskin wrote with the letters TBO on it. Hargrade thinks Bediyoskin's brother, Dr. Smith, can tell them what it means. Hargrade falls asleep and Max and 99 check on Chief. A nurse comes in the room and 99 is suspicious. 99 and Max foil the nurse's assassination attempt on the Chief. KAOS announces that they have dried up Niagara Falls. With Dr. Smith's help they figure out the note means the Three Brothers Omniwash laundry. At the laundry, Agent 13 tells Max and 99 the place is a front for gambling. To pay off his gambling debts, Bediyoskin sold the formula for DRY-UP to KAOS. Following another clue, Max and 99 learn there is a Tom B. Orlando (Kenneth Mars) at Panamint studios in Los Angeles. Otto Hurrah helps Max and 99 get into the studio where they find Orlando. Orlando tells them to meet him in Studio 7. When they get there, they find Orlando dead. Max and 99 then figure out that TBO stands for "The Big One", which is Otto's nickname. Otto knocks out 99 and then confronts Max. Otto admits to having the formula and being with KAOS. A battle ensues with Max finally subduing Otto. Lane Chandler as Gate Guard. June Foray as Telephone Operator.

=== Season 3 (1967–68) ===
For the third season, Get Smart aired on Saturday nights following Maya and opposite The Lawrence Welk Show (ABC) and My Three Sons (CBS).

No. overall	No. in season	Title	Directed by	Written by	Original release date	Prod. code
61	1	"The Spy Who Met Himself"	Gary Nelson	Phil Leslie and Keith Fowler and Norman Paul{	September 16, 1967	061
Max meets up with Agent 38 (Del Moore) and notices something different about him. 38 then knocks Max out. 38 is about to shoot Max when 99 comes along. Back at CONTROL, Chief does not understand why 38 would hit Max. Just then 38 walks in the office. He says that he just escaped from KAOS and there is a double of him out there. Chief suspects that it is the work of the KAOS League of Impostors. They hope to take over CONTROL from within by replacing agents with lookalikes. Meanwhile, KAOS man Siegfried (Bernie Kopell) is talking with Max's double. Max tells Chief that he will be able to tell he is the real Max because he has a bruise on his ankle. What Max does not know is that Siegfried knows about the bruise. Two KAOS agents try to abduct Max, but he gets away. Max gets into Chief's car, but this Chief is a double and he knocks Max out. Siegfried has Max chained up and says there is no way out. The room will be filled with gas that will kill Max. Max does escape. At CONTROL, Chief will give Max the formula for the new Super Sonic Warhead. Just then the real Max walks in. Not knowing which is the real one, Chief takes them both prisoner. During an inquiry, the real Max and Chief wind up shooting the imposters. Robert Karvelas as Larabee. Red West as Balinkov. Note: Final appearance of David Ketchum as Agent 13.
62	2	"Viva Smart"	Norman Abbott	Sam Idelson and Bill Idelson & Norman Paul	September 23, 1967	062
Max and 99 are sent to the Latin American republic of San Saludos. Miguel calls General Diablo Pajarito (Monte Landis), the maniacal dictator. He tells Pajarito that CONTROL agents 86 and 99 have just passed through customs. Pajarito says to kill them and make it look like an accident. Max and 99 know that the overthrown President, Don Carlos (Edward Colmans), is still alive and being held prisoner. A contact tells Max he needs to speak with Lopez. Lopez tells Max and 99 that they are to impersonate two flamenco dancers. They will then be able to get into the palace with no trouble. Later, Lopez is captured and he tells Pajarito what Max and 99 are going to do. Don Carlos' daughter Isabella (Jana Taylor) is with Pajarito at the Fiesta. Pajarito tells her that he will release her father as soon as they are married. Max and 99 do their dance, but then are captured. They are then imprisoned with Don Carlos. Isabella arrives because she would rather die than marry Pajarito. Max finds a way for the firing squad to shoot Pajarito. The four run off, but are captured. The Soldier (Nicholas Georgiade) tells Don Carlos that because Pajarito is dead, they are now free. They want Don Carlos to be President again. Ralph Manza as Cart Driver. Jack Tornek as Townsman. Notes: The title is a parody of the movie Viva Zapata! Joey Bishop has an uncredited cameo as a guard.
63	3	"Witness for the Persecution"	James Komack	Sam Bobrick and Bill Idelson	October 7, 1967	063
Max and 99 are at a toy company that is a KAOS front. Max sees a boy get a football from a man. Max confronts the boy who turns out to be El Lobo-Ito (Billy Curtis). Max is then confronted by Elwood Tudbury (Henry Hunter). Lobo-Ito says the football is a bomb and the three toss it between themselves. 99 defuses the bomb, Lobo-Ito runs away and they capture Tudbury. At CONTROL, Max tries to figure out how KAOS used the football to transmit messages. 99 suggests that Dr. Bascomb (George Ives) examine it. Max is to testify against Tudbury, who ordered Max to be killed. Max is to stay in his apartment for two weeks until the trial. Dr. Bascomb shows Max and 99 some safety devices he installed. Two KAOS agents attempt to kill Max, but he does away with them. Bascomb reluctantly asks Max to stay at his place. Max annoys Bascomb to no end. It is the day of the trial and several attempts are made on Max's life as he goes to the courthouse. 99 thinks Max has been shot and killed, but it was just a dummy. Max makes it to the courthouse. James Nolan as Cop. Kathryn Minner as Little Old Lady. Song: Don sings "When the Saints Go Marching In". Note: A spoof of Witness for the Prosecution.
64	4	"The Spirit Is Willing"	Norman Abbott	Arne Sultan	October 14, 1967	064
It's late at night and Max meets a woman in a cemetery. She tells him her name is Ann Ferris (Ina Balin). Ann wants to know what Max knows about Paul John Mondebello (Than Wyenn) Max says Mondebello is the head of a theatrical agency, which is a front for KAOS. Max says that a key witness against Mondebello was murdered just before the trial. Ann says that for a price, she can give Max the evidence he needs to convict Mondebello. Max is distracted and suddenly Ann is gone. Max calls 99 and she tells him that the witness that was killed was Ann Ferris. At CONTROL, Agent 37 (Byron Morrow) confirms to Max that Ann is dead. Max and 99 go the agency and speak to Vogel about Ann. Mondebello tells Vogel to get rid of the CONTROL agents. Vogel does tell Max where he can find Ann's mother. Mrs. Ferris tells Max that he spoke with Ann's spirit. Mrs. Ferris suggests holding a séance. Max, 99, Mrs. Ferris and Madame Borova (Peggy Mondo) are at Max's apartment. Madame Borova summons Ann and her spirit appears. Ann says Max must give the money to her mother tomorrow and Ann will give her mother the evidence Max needs. Max is to meet Mrs. Ferris at the cemetery. What Max does not know is that Mrs. Ferris is actually Ann in disguise and she and Vogel are a couple. At the cemetery, Mrs. Ferris gives Max the evidence. Because he had Vogel bugged, Mondebello arrives and reveals that Mrs. Ferris is Ann. Mondebello shoots Vogel. The spirit of Mrs. Ferris distracts Mondebello and Max is able to kill him. Notes: Len Lesser (Uncle Leo on Seinfeld) makes his second appearance on the show as Vogel, an assistant to the KAOS leader Paul John Mondebello. The title is based on the biblical expression, "The spirit is willing, but the flesh is weak."
65	5	"Maxwell Smart, Private Eye"	Bruce Bilson	Elroy Schwartz	October 21, 1967	065
At the airport, Max tells Trinka Markoff (Roxane Berard) that he has been assigned to protect her. Trinka is there to address the UN. Two men pull guns on them, but Max and Trinka are able to escape. They get into a cab and Max realizes that Agent 34 is the driver. 34 says he is moonlighting. While Max was out of the country, there were budget cuts at CONTROL. Chief tells Max and 99 that Trinka will not be giving her speech for three days. KAOS will do anything to keep her from making the speech. Max and 99 are getting pay cuts. Max decides to set up shop as a private detective with 99 as his secretary. Mrs. Weatherly (Lynn Borden) comes to Max's new office. She claims her husband has threatened to kill her. Thinking her husband is outside the office, Mrs. Weatherly leaves. Mr. Sydney (Phil Roth) and Mr. Peter (Berry Kroeger) come to the office. They are worried about Trinka and want to hire Max to protect her. The men are actually with KAOS and hope Max will lead them to Trinka. Max and 99 are to take Trinka to a hotel to hold up for a while. Max tells Mr. Sydney. At the hotel, they are ambushed by several KAOS agents. Later, Max tells Chief there must be a traitor at CONTROL who leaked the information about the hotel. Max brings Trinka to his office and Sydney and Peter are there. Max does wind up saving Trinka. Gordon Jump as Man in Cab. Notes: This episode marks the second impression by Adams of Humphrey Bogart on the show, this time as a parody of his Sam Spade role from The Maltese Falcon, and for the parody characters of the Fat Man and Joel Cairo, most famously played by Sydney Greenstreet and Peter Lorre (although here the Fat Man is called Mr. Peter and the Lorre-type character is Mr. Sidney. When Max apologizes for constantly mixing the name up, the Fat Man tells him that it happens "all the time"). Buddy Hackett has a cameo as the duo's bespectacled but nearsighted gunslinger Wilbur (based on "Wilmer Cook" of The Maltese Falcon). The episode's title is printed as "Maxwell Smart, Private Eye" on the DVD edition, but announced as "Maxwell Smart, Private Spy" in Barbara Feldon's spoken introduction, and this title appears in NBC memos shown on the bonus features DVD. In 1967 this episode won the Emmy Award for Outstanding Directing in a Comedy Series.
66	6	"Supersonic Boom"	James Komack	Ben Joelson and Art Baer	October 28, 1967	066
Max brags to Chief that he's always outwitting KAOS and they have probably closed up shop. Meanwhile, KAOS agent Billet (Farley Granger) tells Professor Von Gunther that he wants the supersonic boom machine to zero in on the Chief of CONTROL's office. Chief's office starts to crumble. Billet goes on TV and demands 50 million dollars in 48 hours or KAOS will destroy New York City. Chief wants the machine located and sends Max and 99. After getting a tip from Chief, Max and 99 find where Billet was broadcasting from, under a car wash building. They get captured. Billet will try to convince Max that the machine is in South America. Max and 99 are blindfolded and made to believe they are being driven to the airport. They then are made to believe they are on an airplane. Max and 99 believe they are in Argentina. Max calls Chief and tells him that KAOS moved the machine to Buenos Aires. Max and 99 escape from their cell and discover they are still in Washington DC. 99 goes for help and Max goes back into the car wash. After struggling with some men, Max finds Billet, Von Gunther and the machine. Von Gunther gets shot and Max prevents Billet from setting off the machine. Alex Rocco as Gaucho. Julie Bennett as Stewardess. Dick Crockett as KAOS Agent. Gil Perkins as KAOS Agent. Note: Bill Dana, brother of Irving Szathmary, who composed the series' iconic music, has an uncredited cameo as a pedestrian.
67	7	"One of Our Olives Is Missing"	Jess Oppenheimer	Jess Oppenheimer	November 4, 1967	067
99 meets Max in a hotel bar and says she has a message from Chief. KAOS has a secret lab in this hotel and are receiving information about a nerve gas formula. The device used to receive it is built into an olive pimento. A CONTROL double agent posing as a waiter has stolen the olive. Max finds the waiter with the olive. Just then the waiter gets a knife in his back and drops the olive into a drink. Max goes after the man that threw the knife. An Interviewer (Douglas Rowe) meets Ozark Annie Jones (Carol Burnett), a country and western singing star. Max comes back and learns that Ozark Annie swallowed the olive. KAOS man Siegfried is furious that a double agent stole the olive. He tell KAOS Scientist Shtarker (King Moody) they have no way to get the formula now. Ozark Annie hears voices coming from her stomach. Max tells her she is in danger and she goes with him. There are several KAOS agents in Max's apartment, but Max and Annie inadvertently subdue them. Chief calls and will send a doctor over. Siegfried comes by disguised and Max thinks he's the CONTROL doctor. Max figures out it's Siegfried. Things get confusing and Siegfried eventually captures Annie. A KAOS Doctor (Burt Nodella) is looking over Annie. Max is able to track Annie down and rescue her. Note: The title is a parody of the 1942 movie One of Our Aircraft Is Missing.
68	8	"When Good Fellows Get Together"	Sidney Miller	Gary Clarke	November 18, 1967	068
Max is in a KAOS office and sees a large robot. Four KAOS agents come in the room. They assume Max is one of them. Then Spinoza (Ted de Corsia) and Dr. Ratton (Jim Boles) arrive. Spinoza says that CONTROL has one edge over them and that is their robot Hymie (Dick Gautier). KAOS now has the means to destroy Hymie and that is their super-robot Groppo (Hard Boiled Haggerty). Dr. Ratton finally recognizes Max. Max pulls his gun and escapes. Back at CONTROL, Max tells Agent 42 that Hymie could be in danger. Max wants to get Dr. Harris (Byron Morrow) to give Hymie a complete overhaul. Hymie actually wants to meet another of his own kind. Dr. Harris finishes working on Hymie, but he will need some training. Max and Hymie are at Max's apartment, when Groppo shows up. Max is able to drop a net over Groppo and he and Hymie escape. Max and Hymie go to a ghost town to start training. Hymie thinks he can reason with Groppo. Dr. Harris tells Max that Hymie was programmed for good. They would have to reprogram him to be mean, but it would be irreversible. Hymie overhears this and runs away. Max will confront Groppo and Dr. Harris gives him some weapons. Hymie arrives and tries to be nice to Groppo. Hymie and Groppo get into a battle and Max is able to push Groppo into a well.
69	9	"Dr. Yes"	James Komack	William Raynor and Myles Wilder	November 25, 1967	069
Chief, Max and 99 are at a rocket launch. Chief mentions that something has happened to the last three rockets that caused them to veer of course. The rockets had to be destroyed. The rocket takes off and then suddenly heads towards the command center. The General is about to hit the destruct button, when Professor Kroeger pulls a gun on them. The General and Professor Kroeger, the only two who know where the destruct button is, both get shot. Max inadvertently presses the right button. Chief notices a tattoo on Kroeger's arm. Chief now knows that the KAOS mastermind behind the sabotage is the evil Dr. Yes (Donald Davis). Max and 99 masquerade as vacationers at Lost Lake, which is near Dr. Yes' headquarters. Two men drive up and tell them Lost Lake is a very dangerous place. At his headquarters, which is under the lake, Natasha (Margaret Mason) tells Dr. Yes that Toulouse (Andre Philippe) and Himmel have arrived. They are the men that confronted Max and 99. Max and 99 are tricked into going in the men's camper. There the walls start closing in on them. They manage to escape and figure out Dr. Yes' headquarters is under the lake. There Max and 99 are captured and put in a situation where both will be killed. They are able to escape that room, kill Dr. Yes and prevent the next rocket from going of course. Wally Cox as TV Repairman. Note: Working title: "Señor Si". A spoof of Dr. No.
70	10	"That Old Gang of Mine"	Norman Abbott	Phil Hahn and Jack Hanrahan	December 2, 1967	070
Max and 99 are in London to help the British section of CONTROL. A note from Chief says they are to contact Agent 37. 37 will have instructions on how to locate and capture an American gangster named Scar. Just then Scar walks up to them with his gun drawn. Max is able to shoot him first. The note also says they need to go to a certain pub where the Barmaid (Karen Arthur) will tell them how to get to CONTROL. At CONTROL, Chief is there and introduces Max and 99 to Commander Hathaway. Max is to assume the identity of Scar in order to infiltrate a group of thieves known as the Scorpion Gang. Their leader is Dutchman (Iggie Wolfington). Max makes contact with Dutchman and his men, Turk (Sid Haig), El Gatto (Larry Duran) and Le Mans. They plan to steal the Palace Jewels. While preparing to blow open the safe, Max stalls for time. Max calls Hathaway and speaks with his secretary, Van Cleef. What Max does not know is that she is with the Scorpion Gang. Max kills El Gatto and Le Mans is captured. Max accidentally blows open the safe and Turk starts taking the jewels. Max and Turk bring the jewels to Dutchman, who kills Turk. Van Cleef arrives and kills Dutchman. Chief, 99 and Hathaway show up. It turns out that Van Cleef and Hathaway are KAOS agents, but they do get captured. Notes: Cameo by Danny Thomas as a foppish Englishman. This is a parody of Eve Titus's Basil of Baker Street. The title refers to a barber shop song of the same name.
71	11	"The Mild Ones"	Gary Nelson	William Raynor and Myles Wilder	December 9, 1967	071
Max and 99 are to follow the Baloovian Prime Minister's car. A man is thrown from the car and Max and 99 find it is the Prime Minister's assistant. Realizing the Prime Minister has been kidnapped, Max and 99 get a little information from the assistant before he dies. At CONTROL, Chief is upset that Max botched another mission. Because of something that Larabee says, Chief believes the Prime Minister was kidnapped by a group of surprisingly literate hippie gang members known as the Purple Knights. They see themselves as a modern group of Arthurian Knights of the Round Table who ride motorcycles and speak in Middle Ages slang. Chief believes KAOS is behind the plot. Max and 99 must pass as new gang members to save the Prime Minister. Max and 99 arrive at Dee Dee's Diner, the gang's hangout. They tell Brute, the leader, that their names are Wheels and Legs. Beautiful Doll Baby gives Max a kiss and 99 is not happy. Before joining the gang, Max has to pass a jousting test against Brute. With a little cheating from 99, Max passes. While the gang is asleep, Max and 99 find the Prime Minister, but then are caught by Brute and the others. Max is to be quartered using motorcycles. As the motorcycles pull away, the chains break off them. Max and 99 discover that Doll Baby was responsible for saving Max's life. The Prime Minister is rescued and Max introduces Doll Baby to Chief. Clyde Howdy as Zombie. Note: Cameo by Steve Allen as an aide to the prime minister and future Transformers and G.I. Joe voice actor Michael Bell stars as Brute, the leader of the Purple Knights. A parody of The Wild One.
72	12	"Classification: Dead"	Norman Abbott	David Ketchum and Bruce Shelly	December 23, 1967	072
Max is on a date with Janet. She poisons his glass of water. After he drinks it, she tells him that the poison was a gift from KAOS agent Mr. Hercules (John Fiedler). By 1 PM the following day he will be dead. Chief takes Max to a theater that is a front for CONTROL's lab. Max is to see Dr. Steele, the head toxicologist. Steele turns out to be a beautiful woman. She knows the type of poison Max took, but she is not sure how long it will take to find the antidote. Max says he will find another doctor to get an antidote, but has no luck. At his apartment, Max tells 99 he will be dead in a little over an hour. Max would like to kill the man responsible, Mr. Hercules. Elwood Box (Shelley Berman), from CONTROL, comes by to pick up the body. Max finds a clue that Janet left and he and 99 go to a health food shop. The Proprietor (Anthony Jochim) is able to tell them where Hercules' gym is. Meanwhile, Dr. Steele finds the antidote and Chief has less than a half an hour to find Max. At the gym, Max and 99 are confronted by Janet. 99 is put in another room and Max finally meets Mr. Hercules. Mr. Hercules will give Max the antidote if Max gives him the key to CONTROL's new secret code. Max gives him phony information and Mr. Hercules gives him a phony antidote. Max puts a poison in Hercules' drink, but Max passes out before he can drink the antidote. Chief and 99 show up just in time. Paul 'Mousie' Garner as John the Janitor. Dick Crockett as Henchman. Notes: This is a parody of the 1950s film D.O.A. and the TV series Run For Your Life. This is the first episode to feature Ellen Weston as Dr. Steele.
73	13	"The Mysterious Dr. T"	Gary Nelson	William Raynor and Myles Wilder	December 30, 1967	073
Prof. Longnecker, a top scientist, is being protected by CONTROL. Max brings Longnecker a coffee. Turns out the coffee was poisoned. Before dying, Longnecker admits he has plagiarized all his major scientific findings from another scientist, the mysterious Dr. T. 99 tells Max that Chief is furious. Max tells her about Longnecker's confession. They go to Longnecker's apartment to look for clues as to the identity of Dr. T. Something they find leads them to a Chinese restaurant. They find a clue that says Longnecker was to meet Dr. T there at 3 o'clock. Just then Siegfried and another KAOS agent show up with guns drawn. At 3 o'clock a young paperboy comes in the restaurant, but no one wants a paper. After a while, Siegfried leaves. Max and 99 are walking down the street and are followed by Siegfried. Max tells 99 that he believes the paperboy is Dr. T. and tells Chief. After doing some research, Max learns his name is Dr. Tyler Tattledove (Peter Robbins). Max and Siegfried agree to join forces to find Dr. T and let him decide which side to be on. Back at the Chinese restaurant, Tyler shows up and proves he is Dr. T. Tyler decides to be on the side that 99 is on because she is good looking. Tyler also saves Max's life and Siegfried runs off. Bill Erwin as Mr. Smith. Joe Ploski as Restaurant Patron.
74	14	"The King Lives?"	Gary Nelson	Gloria Burton and Don Adams	January 6, 1968	074
Max and Chief are in the Kingdom of Coronia. They are to meet King Charles, who is very friendly to the US. However, Prime Minister Basil (Michael Forest), Charles' half brother, hates the US. Coronia supplies the US with a mineral vital to their project X2. If something happened to King Charles, the Prime Minister would sell the mineral to our enemies. Chief believes that Basil has hired KAOS to kill the King before his coronation this Saturday. Max and Chief meet Charles, whom Max strongly physically resembles. Just then there is a shot from outside and Charles is hit. Colonel Von Klaus (John Doucette) tells Max and Chief that Charles will be fine, but must have bed rest for a couple days. If Charles is not coronated, Basil will take over. Von Klaus suggests that Max pose as Charles and trains Max in Charles' mannerisms. Max is told that Charles is engaged to Princess Marta (Judith McConnell). Meanwhile, a KAOS Henchman (Albert Cavens) informs Basil that Charles is dead. Basil is surprised when Max, Chief and Von Klaus arrive. Basil spies on Max and 99 and learns who Max is and that Charles is still alive. Max must now fool Marta. Max receives a note that says 99 has been captured. She will be released when Charles' whereabouts are revealed. It takes some doing, but Max finds Basil and 99. Max kills Basil. Notes: This episode is a parody of the movie The Prisoner of Zenda, and is notable for the impression by Don Adams of Ronald Colman, the star of that movie. The episode also features Johnny Carson's second cameo on the show, as a footman to the King.
75	15	"The Groovy Guru"	James Komack	Norman Paul and Burt Nodella	January 13, 1968	075
Max, dressed as a hippie, makes contact with hippie Wailin' Wanda. He asks her if she got any information on hippie disk jockey Groovy Guru (Larry Storch). Wanda says enough to put him away for life. She attaches a purse with the info to Max's wrist and gives him a key. While Max is distracted, she takes the key back. Max leaves. Wanda radio's Groovy Guru and tells him that the bomb is attached to Max's wrist. At CONTROL, Chief and 99 realize that Max is carrying a bomb. Max is tossed down a shaft, but survives the explosion. Chief says that Groovy Guru seeks to control the minds of teenagers through his radio show. Chief and Max go to see Dr. Steele. She gives Max "lie pills", that last up to fifteen minutes. Max accidentally takes one of the pills and things get a bit confusing. Later, Max and 99 meet up with Groovy Guru and learn he is working with KAOS. Groovy Guru tells them his plan to have brainwashed teenagers attack the establishment and then KAOS will take over. Max and 99 are able to escape and prevent Groovy Guru from broadcasting to the teenagers. Barry Newman as Assistant Guru. Notes: This is a parody of the German folktale and Robert Browning's poem "The Pied Piper of Hamelin." In 1997, TV Guide ranked this episode #67 on its list of the 100 Greatest Episodes.
76	16	"The Little Black Book: Part 1"	James Komack	Jack Hanrahan and Phil Hahn	January 27, 1968	076
Max's Army buddy Sid Krimm (Don Rickles) is in town to visit. Max calls 99 and asks her if she has plans for the evening. 99 thinks Max is asking her out, but he is actually setting her up with Sid. She hangs up on him. A woman named Gina comes to Max's apartment. She was working for KAOS, but now wants to get away. While Max gets Gina a drink, she is shot from outside. As Max takes her body to his room, she drops a little "black book". Sid arrives. Max calls Chief and tells him Gina was wounded and he did not get any information from her. Meanwhile, Sid discovers the black book full of women's names and assumes it is a list of women Max knows socially. It is in fact a list of KAOS code names. Sid uses the book to make a phone call and speaks with "Nancy" (Ann Prentiss). KAOS agent Maestro (Robert Easton) tells Nancy to take along Zelda (Arlene Golonka). Then Maestro can search Max's apartment. Max learns about the black book. He and Sid meet Nancy and Zelda at a bar. Max accuses the girls of being with KAOS. Thanks to Sid, Max gets knocked out and the girls get the book. It takes some doing, but Max proves to Sid that he is with CONTROL. Gil Perkins as Waiter. James Komack as Gunman. Note: Working title: "The Visiting Fireman".
77	17	"The Little Black Book: Part 2"	James Komack	Jack Hanrahan and Phil Hahn	February 3, 1968	077
Having found out that Max is a spy, Sid joins him in his search for the black book. As they leave Max's building, they are confronted by three KAOS agents. Max is able to kill them. They are however taken in by two policemen. Sid tells the Police Sergeant that Max is a spy and he is helping Max. Max implies to the Sergeant that Sid is a little shell shocked from the Army. Max and Sid spend the night in jail and the day in court. Now a Psychiatrist (Eddie Ryder) talks to Sid. Max and Sid then see a CONTROL Lawyer (Joey Forman, who previously played Harry Hoo in the series). Max and Sid continue their search for the black book. They find Maestro, Nancy and Zelda. Max and Sid learn that Maestro is a top KAOS assassin. But then Brancato (Corbett Monica) comes up behind them and they are captured. They are chained in a room to be shot by a cannon. Max frees himself and then frees Sid. Maestro comes in the room and he is killed by the cannon. Ernest Borgnine as TV Viewer.
78	18	"Don't Look Back"	Don Adams	Phil Leslie and Norman Paul	February 10, 1968	078
In this parody of The Fugitive, Max gets turned down for a small loan at a bank by Mr. Corrigan (Stuart Nisbet). A one-handed man, who is working with KAOS, follows Max out of the bank. Later, that one-handed man comes back to the bank with his henchman Ravage and they rob the place. The Guard (Albert Cavens) gets killed by Ravage, who looks like Max. Turns out he was wearing a mask. Max is arrested by Sergeant Gronski (Bruce Gordon) and Mr. Lathrop, from the Legal Department. Max is accused of robbing the bank and killing the guard. They also found $50,000 in his apartment. During the trial Max's lawyer, Mr. Hanrahan (Larry Gelman), does not do a very good job. The Judge lets Max say a few words. Max is found guilty and will be executed. Outside the court, Max sees the one-handed man. After forcing the car he is in off the road, Max escapes. Max takes a job in a Diner. The Owner of Diner (Murray Alper) learns who Max is. Instead of turning Max in, he lets Max go. Max calls 99, but Gronski has her phone tapped and now knows where he is. Max finds the one-handed man and Ravage and is able to prove his innocence to Gronski. Lennie Bremen as Truck Driver. Milton Berle as Hotel Desk Clerk. John Hoyt as Narrator. Arthur Tovey as Bank Customer. Note: Working title: "The Fugitive".
79	19	"99 Loses CONTROL"	Bruce Bilson	William Raynor and Myles Wilder	February 17, 1968	079
99 tells Max that she gave Chief her resignation this morning. She accepted a marriage proposal from Victor Royal (Jacques Bergerac), owner of an international casino. 99 met him while on vacation last summer. Max follows 99 to the casino on Saint Germain Island, out of jealousy. Max saves Victor's life and Victor asks Max to be his bodyguard. 99 arrives and goes by the name Susan Hilton. Max asks 99 if she is sure this is the life she wants. A Room Service Attendant (Bob Hope) tells Max that Victor is quite the ladies man. Victor learns that Max knows Susan. Max and 99 learn that Victor is with KAOS. There is a gun battle, but Victor escapes. Max hopes the local police can pick Victor up. Maurice Marsac as Louis. Alfred Dennis as Montaigne. Frank Baker as Gambler. Harvey Parry as Gambler.
80	20	"The Wax Max"	James Komack	James Komack	February 24, 1968	080
An amusement park attendant inadvertently gives Max and 99 a kewpie doll at a shooting gallery game. The evil Waxman (Richard Devon), a villain who turns his victims into wax statues, is furious with the attendant. Waxman orders Max and 99 to be killed. Several attempts on their lives fail. Max and 99 realize it is KAOS that is after them. Max calls Chief and learns that the doll is really a way for KAOS to smuggle plutonium out of the country. Max and 99 wind up in a gun fight on a merry-go-round with a man dressed as Dracula (Robert Ridgely) and another as Frankenstein. Frankenstein is shot and Max and 99 follow Dracula to Waxman's Chamber of Horrors. They are captured. Max is able to get free and kill Waxman. Note: Exteriors filmed on location at Pacific Ocean Park.
81	21	"Operation Ridiculous"	James Komack	Norman Paul	March 2, 1968	081
Max captures a man named Otto (Max Kleven). Chief calls Max and tells him to drop everything and get to the office. When Max and 99 get to the office, Chief is wearing a Toupée. Chief tells them that Weeknews magazine is doing a feature story on CONTROL. This article could make CONTROL look good, which would mean more appropriations from the federal government. Mr. Fitzmaurice (George Macready) and his assistant Miss Magruder arrive. Fitzmaurice will accompany Max for the day. What they do not know is that Miss Magruder is with KAOS. A bad review could put CONTROL out of business, which would help KAOS advance their evil plans without resistance. To try to influence this outcome, KAOS plots to do what it can to make Max look even more stupid, inept, clueless and ridiculous than usual. Things do go wrong for Max. Plus, a Foreign Minister, that CONTROL was to protect, is found drugged. The Minister is taken to see Dr. Steele. Chief has also been drugged and then Miss Magruder is able to drug Dr. Steele. Max thinks Fitzmaurice is with KAOS, but then 99 figures out it is Miss Magruder. George Holmes as Elevator Passenger. Burt Nodella as Photographer.
82	22	"Spy, Spy, Birdie"	James Komack	William Raynor and Myles Wilder	March 9, 1968	082
Albert J. Pfister (Percy Helton), a man who hates noise, comes to Max's apartment. He wants Max's help in eliminating the noise in the world, but Max has to leave. Max and 99 see a statue blow up without a sound. Chief believes KAOS has devised a silent explosive. Siegfried and Starker confront Max and 99 believing that CONTROL has the silent explosive. They receive a note stating that Pfister invented the explosive. Because neither KAOS nor CONTROL will help him, in six hours he will use the explosive against every capitol in the world. Max and Siegfried must team up to oppose the man. They are able to track Pfister down, but then Pfister captures the four of them. They are able to knock out Pfister before he releases the pigeons with the explosives. But then Siegfried releases one that is labeled The Pentagon. Pfister comes to and says the bird is actually headed to KAOS headquarters. Note: A spoof of Bye, Bye Birdie.
83	23	"Run, Robot, Run"	Bruce Bilson	Gary Clarke	March 16, 1968	083
Max and 99 are at a track meet between athletes from the Free World and the Iron Curtain. The American athletes have had several accidents that could cost them the event. Chief and Hymie believe that Donald Snead (John Orchard) and Emily Neal (Lyn Peters), (parodies of John Steed and Emma Peel from The Avengers) are responsible. They are part of KAOS' Contrived Accidents Division (CAD). Max gets upset when Chief puts Hymie in charge. To keep the three athletes safe, Hymie will put them in Max's apartment. They discover that Max's place has been tampered with. The next day, two of the athletes are sprayed with a paralyzing gas. Hymie fills in for them and breaks some records. Snead believes Hymie is a CONTROL robot. Emily kisses Hymie with a special lipstick that drains his batteries. The last event is a mile run and athlete Purvis is drugged. Hymie will run instead and 99 gives him an extra battery. Right before the finish line, Hymie runs out of power. Something 99 does gets Hymie across the line for a victory. Shep Houghton as Official. Jack Tornek as Competition Spectator.
84	24	"The Hot Line"	Gary Nelson	Story by : Red Benson; Teleplay by : Phil Hahn and Jack Hanrahan	March 23, 1968	084
Thinking it's a front for KAOS, Max goes in a bakery and destroys some communication equipment. Chief in there. Turns out the place is a CONTROL front and Max destoyed CONTROL equipment. Gorshen (John Byner), a KAOS voice impersonator, fires the Chief over the phone while pretending to be President Johnson. Chief reverts to his old status as Agent Q. Max becomes the new Chief. Gorshen tells Max that he is sending his efficiency expert Mat Brady (Dick Yarmy) to help. While infiltrating CONTROL, Brady is to copy as many files as he can. Posing as Irving the Waiter, Chief believes the restaurant is the front for KAOS' communication center. KAOS agent Bolger (Robert DoQui) knows who Irving really is. Chief knocks Bolger out before he can do anything and ties him up. Max, 99 and Brady come to the restaurant. Max, 99 and Chief are captured. They are able to escape and capture the KAOS agents. Chief gets his old job back. Joe Ploski as Waiter. Notes: In this episode, Edward Platt uses his operatically trained singing voice. Regis Philbin appears as a CONTROL operative in a bakery. The title refers to telephone connection between the White House and the Kremlin set up after the Cuban Missile Crisis that almost caused nuclear war.
85	25	"Die, Spy"	Gary Nelson	Story by : Gerald Gardner and Dee Caruso; Teleplay by : Phil Hahn and Jack Hanrahan	March 30, 1968	086
Max, 99, Chief and the KAOS Chief (Anthony Eustrel) attend the funeral of double agent Johan. An attempt is made to kill Chief and the KAOS Chief, which Max helps prevent. Max believes that Atrocities, Cruelties and Brutalities, better known as ACB (a parody of the ABC television network), a third spy network, was behind the attempt. Chief assigns Max and Samuels (Stu Gilliam) to find ACB's leader, Kubacek. Kubacek is a ping-pong fanatic. Max and 99 will pose as ping-pong champs with Samuels as their trainer. They play various cities around the world hoping to run into Kubacek. A woman named Tamara tells Max that she and her partner Tahday are CONTROL agents. Kubacek wanted them to defect to ACB. At a club in Istanbul where they hope to find Kubacek, Tamara and Tahday are shot and killed. Max and 99 learn that Samuels is actually Kubacek. If Max can beat him at ping pong, Kubacek will let them live. Chief shows up, but Kubacek manages to take them all into custody. Max is able to kill Kubacek. George Sawaya as Brawler. Notes: The episode is a parody of I Spy, and Samuels is a parody of Bill Cosby's tennis pro character Alexander Scott. Robert Culp, the other star of I Spy, has a cameo as a Turkish waiter. Working title: "That's the Way the Ball Bounces".
86	26	"The Reluctant Redhead"	James Komack	Leonard Stern	April 6, 1968	085
Max and Agent Bodecker (Noam Pitlik) are in Kinsey Krispin's (Cesar Romero) home. There they take a picture of a painting of Krispin's wife Amanda. Max is able to escape, but Bodecker is killed. At CONTROL, Chief tells Max and 99 that Krispin has a list of KAOS informers that CONTROL would very much like to have. Chief shows them a picture of Mimsi Sage (Julie Sommars), who strongly resembles Amanda. Chief says that Mimsi is a writer of children's books. It takes quite a bit of doing to get mousy Mimsi to act like the jet-setting Amanda. Max and Mimsi go to see Krispin and he seems to believe she is Amanda. Mimsi gets drunk and starts flirting with Max. Krispin goes to hand Max the list when Mimsi pulls out a gun and grabs the list. Turns out Mimsi really was Amanda. Things get complicated when a lot of other people get involved. Max, 99 and Chief do get the list. Alan Baxter as Senator Wheelwright. Dick Crockett as Knupnick. Note: Working title: "Smart's Waterloo".

=== Season 4 (1968–69) ===
Season Four of Get Smart aired on Saturday nights following Adam-12 and opposite The Newlywed Game (ABC) and the second half of The Jackie Gleason Show (CBS). It was the last season on NBC.

No. overall	No. in season	Title	Directed by	Written by	Original release date	Prod. code
87	1	"The Impossible Mission"	Bruce Bilson	Arne Sultan, Allan Burns, Chris Hayward and Leonard Stern	September 21, 1968	087
Max gets a message from Chief that Dr. Albert Hellman has been murdered. They must stop KAOS agent The Leader from smuggling the Hellman theory out of the country. It could mean the end of civilization. Max and 99 are in a record store and try to find out who The Leader is from a Musician (Jamie Farr). Before the Musician can tell them, he is poisoned. Later, Dr. Simon (Ann Elder) demonstrates a computerized trumpet to Chief and Max. Chief says that KAOS is going to use a television special featuring Herb Talbot's (Aron Kincaid) Tijuana Tin (a parody of Herb Alpert and his Tijuana Brass) to send out the deadly formula. Max will go undercover as a trumpet player and 99 will be a dancer. They discover that The Leader is Herb Talbot. Unfortunately, their cover is blown and Talbot orders them to be found and killed. After a chase, Max and 99 are trapped in a room. They confess their love for each other and kiss. Max says he would marry 99 if they survived this mission. Talbot and his henchman do wind up getting captured. Eddie Hice as Drummer. Robert Karvelas as Larabee. Note: A spoof of Mission: Impossible.
88	2	"Snoopy Smart vs. the Red Baron"	Reza Badiyi	Mike Marmer	September 28, 1968	088
Max, 99 and Chief are on a flight to Boise, Idaho. From there they will go to Twin Falls, which is where 99's mother (Jane Dulo) lives. KAOS has devised a new way of destroying the American potato crop. KAOS is demanding a 10 billion dollar ransom or they will destroy all of the crops. Max, 99 and Chief meet Dr. Leviathan at the Department of Agriculture. Later, Max and 99 go to see her Mother. Max sees Siegfried (Bernie Kopell) across the street. Mother says that is Mr. Smith, who moved in a month ago. After finding a plane covered in hay, Max and 99 are captured by Siegfried and Starker (King Moody). Siegfried uses a crop dusting plane to spread a bacteria that destroys the crops. Max and 99 manage to escape and meet up with Chief. Max gets in another prop plane and goes after Siegfried. Siegfried shoots down Max's plane and Max jumps onto Siegfried's plane. Max is able to gets Siegfried's gun and takes control. Mother tells 99 that her father was a spy. Mary Frann as Stewardess. Note: A spoof of "Snoopy vs. the Red Baron".
89	3	"Closely Watched Planes"	Bruce Bilson	Chris Hayward, Allan Burns, Arne Sultan and Leonard Stern	October 5, 1968	089
Four CONTROL couriers disappear from airplanes during mid-flight. This time Max is guarding courier Busby (Ward Wood). Busby goes to the restroom and disappears. Back at CONTROL, Chief is furious with Max. Max and 99 mention that they are engaged. Chief says that CONTROL has a policy against spies marrying. Max will be the courier for the next flight. Chief tells Max that a parachute salesman named Tolliver (Ivan Bonar) has been on each of the flights where the couriers went missing. Another suspect is Dr. Hugo Von Shickel (Pete Barbutti), a German scientist. The third suspect is Shandar the Great, a magician and escape artist. On the flight Max learns that 99 is posing as a flight attendant. Tolliver tells Max that he is actually a double agent and knows who's behind the disappearances. Tolliver passes out because he was drugged. Max and 99 now suspect Barbara Cleveland, the hostess. 99 radios Chief and he says he got permission for her and Max to marry. Barbara pulls a gun on 99. Max discovers a trap door in the restroom. Barbara is captured and the Pilot and Co-Pilot are KAOS agents also. Note: The title spoofs the film Closely Watched Trains.
90	4	"The Secret of Sam Vittorio"	Gary Nelson	Allan Burns, Chris Hayward, Arne Sultan and Leonard Stern	October 12, 1968	090
At CONTROL Max, 99 and Chief are watching a film about robbers Connie and Floyd, who look remarkably like 99 and Max. Connie and Floyd befriended gangster Sam Vittorio (J. Carrol Naish). Chief tells Max and 99 that Connie and Floyd have been in jail for the last 30 years. They were never able to convict Vittorio and find out where he hid the millions he stole. Vittorio is dying and he made arrangements to get Connie and Floyd out of prison and tell them the location of the money. Max and 99 will pose as Connie and Floyd so that KAOS does not get the money. Max and 99 meet up with Vittorio. While Vittorio is out of the room, Max and 99 talk about their plan. Vittorio is listening in and realizes they are imposters. Chief learns the real Connie and Floyd escaped. Things get confusing when the real Connie and Floyd show up to Vittorio's home. Thinking they are the imposters, Vittorio shoots the real Connie and Floyd. Thinking Max and 99 are the real Connie and Floyd, Vittorio tells them he has no money and crime does not pay. Johnny Silver as Jojo. Note:This episode is a Bonnie and Clyde parody; the title is a parody of The Secret of Santa Vittoria.
91	5	"Diamonds Are a Spy's Best Friend"	Jerry Hopper	Arne Sultan, Allan Burns, Chris Hayward and Leonard Stern	October 19, 1968	091
Max is outside of Spiegel's Jewelry Store to buy a reasonably-priced engagement ring for 99. Max calls Chief who tells him KAOS has been smuggling diamonds out of the country to fund the European payroll. It could be the work of the League of Bald Headed Men, KAOS's smuggling unit. Meanwhile, Spiegel (Dick Wilson) is being robbed by KAOS. The two men hide in back when Max comes in. Spiegel sells Max the Morris Diamond, worth $275,000, for $80, to keep KAOS from getting their hands on it. Later, 99 shows Chief the diamond ring and he says it is the Morris Diamond. Chief wonders where Max could get that amount of money. Chief and 99 confront Max and he takes them to Spiegel's store. The two KAOS agents are still there and they get away with the Morris Diamond. Some clues lead Max and 99 to check the local bowling alleys. At the last alley, Max finds the Morris Diamond in the finger hole of a ball. That is how KAOS is smuggling the diamonds. Gino Conforti as Agent 8½. Duke Fishman as KAOS Agent. Note: The title is a play on the song "Diamonds Are a Girl's Best Friend".
92	6	"The Worst Best Man"	Gary Nelson	Chris Hayward, Allan Burns, Arne Sultan and Leonard Stern	October 26, 1968	092
One by one, KAOS knocks off CONTROL agents Schlermer (Ron Masak), Novak (Hal DeWindt) and Agent 38 (Karen Arthur). They had each been asked to be Max's best man for his upcoming wedding with 99. Chief and 99 learn about the connection. Hymie (Dick Gautier) asks Max why he has not been asked to be best man. There are three men on Max's list that he has not asked yet. They think one could be a double agent. Max asks Prewitt, Holloway and Finch and each meet with foul play. KAOS agent Oleg (Avery Schreiber) is listening in on Max and Chief. Because of his presumed indestructibility, Chief insists that Hymie be Max's best man. Oleg and Stanislaus (Bernard Barrow) capture Hymie. KAOS will use Hymie as a container in which they place a bomb. The objective being to send Hymie back to Max's bachelor party and blow up all the CONTROL agents in attendance. At the party Max hears a strange noise coming from Hymie and discovers the bomb. With seconds to spare, Max removes the bomb. Albert Cavens as Boxing Match Spectator. Note: Final appearance of Dick Gautier as Hymie.
93	7	"A Tale of Two Tails"	Jerry Hopper	Allan Burns, Chris Hayward, Arne Sultan and Leonard Stern	November 2, 1968	093
Max tells 99 that he has to substitute at the CONTROL spy school for a day. He will not be able to help her shop for the upcoming wedding. Chief calls 99. He knows it is her day off, but he needs her to pick up components of a scientific formula. She will be able to do that and shop at the same time. The only two men in Max's class are Lundy (Fred Willard), Agent 198, and Caruso, Agent 199. They are lacking in their tailing skills. As a good exercise, Max has the new agents tail 99. Of course 99 spots the rookies right away and assumes that they must be KAOS agents. Chief confesses to Max that he sent 99 out on a dangerous mission. There is a lot of confusion when Chief and Max try to discuss the case under the Cone Of Silence. Chief tells 99 to take the components to Lum Fong (Spencer Chan), who will combine them and change to a new code. 99 mistakenly gives the components to KAOS agent Yamasaki (Victor Sen Yung). Max arrives and tells 99 that the two men she thought were KAOS were actually CONTROL agents Lundy and Caruso. Max goes after Yamasaki and captures him. Note: The title of the episode references Dickens' A Tale of Two Cities.
94	8	"The Return of the Ancient Mariner"	Gary Nelson	Allan Burns, Chris Hayward, Arne Sultan and Leonard Stern	November 9, 1968	094
KAOS's master of disguise, the Chameleon, is back in circulation. Chief had to send Hymie on a mission and he will not be able to be Max's best man. Chief recommends that Admiral Hargrade (William Schallert), the former CONTROL chief, be the best man. Hargrade is in town for an important conference. Because he will be staying at Max's place, Max will be able to keep an eye on the Admiral at all times. 99 comes by the apartment to tell Max that Mr. Bob (Jack Cassidy), the interior decorator, will be there soon. Despite being worried about the Chameleon, Max reluctantly agrees to let Mr. Bob in. Later, Larabee comes by and tells Max that Chief wants to see him and 99. Larabee will guard Hargrade. Max and 99 get to Chief's office and Larabee is there. They all go to Max's place. It has been ransacked but Hargrade is still there. Hargrade says that when the Chameleon lunged at him, he fell out the window. Mr. Bob comes back and Max and him get into an altercation, because Max thinks he is the Chameleon, which he was not. Turns out Hargrade is the Chameleon and he will go to the conference. At the conference, the real Hargrade is there. It is 99 that is the Chameleon and he escapes. George DeNormand as Naval Officer. Arthur Tovey as Officer. Note: The title of the episode references Coleridge's "Rime of the Ancient Mariner".
95	9	"With Love and Twitches"	Gary Nelson	Arne Sultan, Allan Burns, Chris Hayward and Leonard Stern	November 16, 1968	095
Max meets with KAOS defector, scientist Dr. Madre (Alan Oppenheimer). When Max is not looking, Madre pours a liquid into Max's drink. Madre wants to give Max the location of the Melnick uranium mine. Madre says it is in the form of a "drinkable map". Max must stay upright for the next 48 hours, or else the map will not break out properly as a rash on his chest. Unfortunately, Max's marriage and honeymoon with 99 are planned for tomorrow. Max tells Chief that he has to postpone the wedding and he tells him why. Chief just thinks Max is getting cold feet. Max tries to explain it to 99. Madre shows up to Max's apartment with two KAOS agents, Kohlman (Jay Lawrence) and Jacoby (Larry Vincent). Kohlman tells Max that once they get the map, they will stage Max's suicide. It is almost time for the wedding. Admiral Hargrade arrives to pick Max up. Max is able to get the guns away from the agents and locks them in a closet, but they get out. Max, Hargrade and Madre head to the wedding with the agents following. There are more problems, but Max and 99 do get married. Ned Wever as Judge. Mace Neufeld as Herbert. Sharon Cintron as Waitress. Note: The title is a play on the Brothers Grimm's fairy tales: "Cinderella" and "Snow White."
96	10	"The Laser Blazer"	Jay Sandrich	Mike Marmer	November 30, 1968	096
Chief is in Hong Kong and meets with tailor Lin Chan (Leonard Strong). CONTROL has a new secret weapon. The weapon, as it turns out, is a man's blazer with a button on it that activates a laser beam of great strength, the "Laser Blazer". Chief tells Chan that Max will be there shortly to pick up the weapon, but he does not know what it is. It takes quite a bit of doing for Chan to get Max to take the blazer. Back at home, Max tells 99 that he went to get a secret weapon and came home with a blazer. 99 tells Max that she hired a maid. Ingrid (Julie Newmar) arrives. Max tries on the blazer and unknowingly triggers the laser several times. Max and 99 notice things missing, that he hit with the laser, and Max thinks the maid may have took them. Turns out Ingrid is an undercover KAOS agent after the blazer. 99 gives Mr. Antonelli (Ralph Manza), the tailor, some clothes including the blazer. Chief comes by and tells Max the blazer is the secret weapon. Chief and Max go to track down the blazer and learn it was sent back to the apartment. Ingrid calls KAOS and says it is the wrong blazer. Max gets home and two KAOS (Chuck Courtney and Eddie Hice) agents show up. A delivery boy arrives with the correct blazer and then Chief shows up. Owen Bush as Owner.
97	11	"The Farkas Fracas"	Jay Sandrich	Allan Burns, Chris Hayward, Arne Sultan and Leonard Stern	December 7, 1968	097
Chief and Max are in a gun battle with KAOS agents by Pier 47. Chief finds a way to subdue the men. Max invites Chief over for dinner. Meanwhile, nosy neighbor Naomi Farkas (Alice Ghostley) bothers 99 with complaints about her husband Emil (Tom Bosley). Naomi gives 99 some flowers that turn out to be a listening device. Naomi and Emil are working for KAOS. Max comes home and tells 99 that Chief is coming for dinner. 99 says they need a desert. Chief arrives at Max's apartment. He mentions that he has a briefcase with the names of KAOS defectors. There is an emergency meeting at the Pentagon which he will be going to after dinner. In order to get a look at the files, Naomi brings over a poisoned chocolate mousse. Max and Chief start to suffer the gastric effects of the mousse. Because 99 did not have any desert, Naomi keeps her busy in the kitchen. Emil goes to take pictures of the files. 99 tells Max that she got the desert from Naomi. Chief knows that the Farkases are with KAOS. Chief has a remote that will blow up his briefcase. Turns out Emil took Max's briefcase and Chief blew up his when he did not need to. Max helped decode the list and has a copy of it. Note: Original title was "What are Neighbours For?" but was changed before broadcasting.
98	12	"Temporarily Out of CONTROL"	James Komack	Allan Burns, Chris Hayward, Arne Sultan and Leonard Stern	December 14, 1968	098
Max and 99 are preparing to leave on their Caribbean honeymoon. Max gets a telegram stating he has been called up for his naval reserve duty in 24 hours. Max asks Chief if he can do something to cancel the reserve duty. Turns out that Chief was called up as well. Because CONTROL is a secret organization, the Navy does not know about their status. Chief is just as upset as he was to meet with Jose Vargas, a member of the Spanish Secret Service. Vargas was to pick up the Obermier file, Obermier being KAOS' number one espionage agent. Max suggests 99 fill in. Aboard the ship, Max is an officer and Chief is a sailor named John Doe. After seeing something in the paper, Chief realizes that KAOS got them assigned to reserve duty. They have someone pose as Vargas and then KAOS will get the Obermier file. Max and Chief go to see the Captain (Russ Conway), hoping to get off the ship. Things do not go well and Max and Chief wind up in the Brig. It takes some doing, but they escape from their cell. They are caught, but the Captain checked out their story and they board a helicopter to leave the ship. Max and Chief get to CONTROL. 99 had already spotted the fake Vargas and had him arrested. Sean Kenney as Lieutenant.
99	13	"Schwartz's Island"	Bruce Bilson	Chris Hayward, Allan Burns, Arne Sultan and Leonard Stern	December 21, 1968	099
Max and 99 are on their honeymoon. They are on a sailboat in the Caribbean. Thanks to Max's inept behavior, he blows up the sailboat and he and 99 wind up in a raft. Meanwhile, Chief learns that Max and 99 are lost at sea and he will head down there. Max and 99 wind up on an island and find footprints. They come upon a cottage and a giant magnet. Suddenly Siegfried and Starker show up. Siegfried says they are on a synthetic island that was designed by KAOS scientist Schwartz. The island is also mobile. Siegfried demonstrates the massive nuclear electromagnetic device. Their plan is to attract the entire U.S. Sixth Fleet, which will just happen to pass by the island in a short amount of time. They will run the ships aground on Schwartz's island. Looking through a telescope, 99 sees Chief on a Coast Guard ship nearby. Using the magnet, Siegfried captures Chief. Siegfried tells them that once the fleet is grounded, there is a magnet on the ocean floor that will pull the island and the fleet down. Siegfried puts Max, 99 and Chief in quicksand and he and Starker leave the island. They find a way to move the magnet, get out of the quicksand, turn the magnet off and get off the island. Note: The episode is a spoof of Gilligan's Island, a show produced by Sherwood Schwartz.
100	14	"One Nation Invisible"	Harry Falk	Lloyd Turner and Whitey Mitchell	December 28, 1968	100
99 is on an assignment and calls Max long distance. A Spiffy Vacuum Salesman (Eddie Ryder) comes by the apartment. The dirt he dumps on the carpet turns into gas and knocks out Max. Max comes to, calls Chief and says his apartment had been ransacked. Chief says they were KAOS agents looking for Dr. Canyon (Lyn Peters). Canyon is a KAOS scientist that invented an invisibility spray. Canyon has defected to this country and will give the spray to CONTROL. At his office, Chief tells Max that KAOS has stolen the Ginsburg Papers. Canyon can use the spray to gain access to KAOS and get the papers back. Max is assigned to protect Canyon. Because Dr. Canyon has sprayed herself with said invisibility spray, Max has no idea she is a beautiful woman. Still invisible, Max brings Canyon to his apartment in the middle of the night and she passes out. 99 comes home early from her assignment just as Dr. Canyon's invisibility spray is wearing off. 99 sees the beautiful woman and starts to leave. Max and Canyon are able to prove who she is and Chief shows up. Because Max used the last of the spray, he will have to get the Ginsburg Papers. Max confronts KAOS agents Woodman (Dick Latessa) and Moorpark (Ed Kovens). He does not know the spray has worn off and they can see him. Fortunately Canyon shows up invisible and they overpower the agents. Note: The title is a parody of the Pledge of Allegiance of the United States, "one nation, indivisible".
101	15	"Hurray for Hollywood"	Don Adams	Chris Hayward and Arne Sultan	January 4, 1969	101
Max and 99 are to meet Becker and find him shot. Chief complains that it took two years to destroy KAOS' communication system. Now they have come up with a whole new system. Becker was killed before he could give the information to CONTROL. Max and 99 are to go undercover as stage actors to find out how KAOS is smuggling scientific information out of the country. Pedechefsky (Ivor Francis) will give them acting lessons. Max does not do well. Max and 99 meet Director Victor Polo and the writer of the play, Carl Shirtsinger (Terry Kilburn). KAOS learns the new actors are CONTROL agents. They plot to kill Max by replacing a real gun for the stage prop gun used in the play. Max is also given new lines to say that are actually code for KAOS agents in the audience. Chief and Larabee are at the performance. 99 fires the gun, missing Max. They both realize there are real bullets. With Chief's help, Polo and Shirtsinger are arrested on stage and the audience thinks it is part of the play. Shep Houghton as Theater Patron. Note: The title is a parody of the 1934 standard "Hooray for Hollywood".
102	16	"The Day They Raided the Knights"	Reza Badiyi	Rick Mittleman	January 11, 1969	102
Max and 99 are on assignment when 99 is captured by a KAOS Agent (Dennis Cross). Max gets captured as well, but they are able to overpower the Agent. Max learns from Chief that it is budget-cutting time at CONTROL. 99, who has less seniority, is temporarily laid off. Chief tells Max that they got a lead on the KAOS munitions shipment. Because they captured the KAOS agent, Chief says they learned of KAOS' new weapon, a stereophonic gun (two guns mounted left-right on a common trigger base). A large shipment of these guns are to arrive soon. Rather than be idle, 99 applies for a job at a stamp redemption center (the late 1960s was the heyday of S & H Green Stamps). However, the redemption center is a KAOS munitions depot that CONTROL has been actively looking for. Sonja (Nancy Kovack) brings 99's application to Marco, who recognizes her as a CONTROL agent. Marco wants to hire 99 to find out if CONTROL knows about their operation there. Marco learns that most of the CONTROL agents are away from town on a false lead. KAOS can use the opportunity to distribute its new weapon to its agents. They will hide the weapon in a toaster box. 99 wonders why so many people are requesting the toaster and discovers the gun. 99 tries calling Chief, but is stopped by Sonja. Chief and Larabee disguise themselves and go to the redemption center, but they are captured. Max shows up and there is a struggle with Marco. Turns out the manufacturer took "stereophonic gun" literally and the gun plays music. Jocelyn Lane as Hippie. Note: The title is a parody of the movie The Night They Raided Minsky's.
103	17	"Tequila Mockingbird"	Don Adams	Chris Hayward and Arne Sultan	January 18, 1969	103
The Tequila Mockingbird (a statue rather like the Maltese Falcon) has been recovered by Esperanza, a CONTROL operative posing as a cantina showgirl in a sleepy Mexican town called Mira Loma. In the cantina, Dietrick (Oscar Beregi) tells Valdez that KAOS will pay $500,000 for the statue. Dietrick figures out that Esperanza is sending a message to CONTROL with her castanets as to the whereabouts of the statue. Valdez kills Esperanza during her performance but she has hidden the statue beforehand. Chief is sending Max and 99 to recover the statue. Max will go undercover as down-and-out doctor Earl J. Libecker. In Mira Loma, Max meets Valdez and Dietrick. 99 is undercover as Rosita DelGato, a Spanish singer at the cantina (who performs "Cielito Lindo" as part of her act). 99 tells Max that Esperanza must have left a clue as to where the statue is hidden. They then find a small axe with a red W on it. Dietrick learns who Libecker and DelGato really are. The axe leads 99 to another clue which she shows to Max. Max goes to the town fountain and finds the statue. This leads to a mexican standoff between Max, Dietrick and Valdez. Chief is there and Dietrick and Valdez are captured. Notes: The episode is a spoof of The Good, the Bad and the Ugly. The title is a play on Harper Lee's novel To Kill a Mockingbird.
104	18	"I Shot 86 Today"	Jay Sandrich	Burt Nodella	February 1, 1969	104
Max and 99 visit a golf club to meet a contact. Golf Pro Chuck Cramer (Charles Bateman) agrees to give them a ride to the next hole on his cart. Max falls off the cart. Max and 99 run into Frank Fargo (Tom Hatten) and believe he is their contact. Fargo tells them that at four o'clock KAOS is planning on blowing up the aerospace center adjacent to the golf course. Turns out that Cramer is with KAOS. He hits Fargo with a poisoned golf ball before Fargo can say anything else. Chief tells Max and 99 that Fargo will be alright. KAOS has already blown up two other space centers this year, just as they were to test the M14 rocket. Chief suspects Cramer is involved and wants Max and 99 to be with him at four o'clock. Max goes to see Dr. Simon (Sharon Acker), who gives him special golf equipment. Max and 99 are golfing with Cramer and it is almost four o'clock. Cramer gives Max an explosive golf ball, but instead of hitting it, Max throws it away and it explodes. Max and 99 figure out how Cramer intends to launch the explosive at the space center. Using a special golf ball that Dr. Simon gave him, Max is able to destroy the explosive.
105	19	"Absorb the Greek"	Richard Benedict	Arne Sultan and Chris Hayward	February 8, 1969	105
Max and 99 have been ordered from higher up to tail Chief based on his recent behavior. They are watching Chief at a computer dating service, which he has been to three times in two weeks. Dr. Stanton (Stuart Nisbet), of the dating service, sets Chief up with a young Greek girl named Gina Paponickolini (Aliza Gur). Later, Max and 99 confess to Chief that they have been ordered to spy on him. They think he should stop seeing the young girl. What they do not know is Chief is under deep cover. The girl is married to scientist Dr. Paponickolini. She is using her "dates" with Chief to pass information to him about an "eternal youth" formula her husband is working on. Meanwhile, KAOS agents Stroheim (Jack DeLeon) and Preminger (Joseph Mell) know that Paponickolini has left Athens. Stroheim wonders why he has not arrived and given his formula to CONTROL. Stroheim learns that the Doctor is still in Greece. Someone else is giving CONTROL the formula. Max and 99 try to set Chief up with 99's mother. Stroheim and Preminger believe 99's mother is Paponickolini's wife and kidnap her from Max's apartment. Chief confesses to Max and 99 about Gina and the formula. After a while Stroheim and Preminger realize they have kidnapped the wrong person. Max and 99 arrive and capture the KAOS agents. Note: The episode is a spoof of Zorba the Greek.
106	20	"To Sire, with Love: Part 1"	Gary Nelson	Arne Sultan and Chris Hayward	February 15, 1969	106
Chief has a special mission for Max that calls for him to have a thin mustache. Meanwhile, King Charles of Coronia (Don Adams as the very Ronald Colman-like king whom we met in the Season 3 episode "The King Lives") is being smuggled into the country in a mummy case. Larabee lost the truck that was carrying the case in heavy traffic. The mummy case does arrive at CONTROL. Max and 99 are to meet Chief at a masquerade ball at the Coronian Embassy. At the ball, Max is drugged and the King takes his place. 99 can not tell. When Max comes to, he is with Chief and Colonel Von Klaus (John Doucette). Von Klaus tells Max that Charles wants a very large loan from the US to keep his Army strong. As security, Charles turns over the Royal Diamond Scepter. The King's enemies will do anything to stop this mission. Chief believes that swashbuckling yet devious Rupert of Rathskeller (James Caan) will try to steal the scepter to prevent the loan. Chief wants Max to pose as Charles and Charles will stay at Max's apartment and pose as Max. Later, Rupert confronts Max, thinking he is Charles, but Max escapes. After finding a clue, Rupert learns that it is Max. Back at the apartment, things are more complicated as Max is now married to 99, and he fears that the charming King may be doing more to sweep 99 off her feet than he can. Chief comes by and Max can not remember where he put the scepter. After much confusion, they do find it. KAOS releases a tarantula into the apartment. Note: The title of the episode is a play on the film To Sir, With Love.
107	21	"To Sire, with Love: Part 2"	Jay Sandrich	Gloria Burton and Don Adams	February 22, 1969	107
Max and 99 are able to kill the tarantula. 99 thinks that KAOS knows Charles is in the apartment. Max thinks the tarantula got in through a window. 99's confusion makes Max jealous and leads to marital coolness in the Smart household. Max pretends to be Charles to test 99's loyalty. Thanks to a call from Colonel Von Klaus, 99 now knows what Max is up to and she decides to teach him a lesson. Something Charles says leads Max to know what 99 was doing and the two make up. In the meantime, Rupert of Rathskeller has kidnapped the King. Max finds a network of tunnels beneath the Coronian embassy where the King is being held. Max confronts two guards but then is taken into custody by Rupert. Rupert learns that the scepter is in the embassy room. He now has no need for neither Max nor Charles and plans to dump them in bronze. Max and Rupert get into a sword fight. Rupert manages to escape just as Chief and Von Klaus show up. Charles is safe. Eddie Hice as KAOS Agent. Pat McCormick as Otto. Don Rickles as Guard.
108	22	"Shock It to Me"	Jay Sandrich	Arne Sultan and Chris Hayward	March 1, 1969	108
Max is undercover as a truck driver carrying valuable electronics as three similar shipments have already been hijacked by KAOS. A man stops Max on the road claiming his car has broken down. While Max is working on the man's car, he is duped out of his shipment as well. Max is able to identify the hijacker by a picture, but Chief tells Max that he's deceased. Max, 99 and Chief speak with Mr. Obler (Milton Parsons) at the County Morgue. Morgue records confirm the man was dead. Chief says that the three other men who stole the shipments were killed two months ago. Chief believes KAOS has found a way to bring their dead agents back to life. Records also show who signed out the bodies, a mad KAOS scientist, Dr. Eric Zharko (Tom Poston, who was originally considered for the role of Maxwell Smart). Max and 99 head out to Zharko's Newfoundland hideout to stop him. Obler warns Zharko about Max and 99. Zharko is in his cave laboratory and knows Max and 99 are nearby. Zharko has his henchman Bruce (Sid Haig) capture them. Zharko explains how he is able to bring people back to life with electricity. He will use Max and 99 for his next experiment, putting people in suspended animation. Max is able to overpower Bruce and he and 99 escape. But they wind up in Zharko's lab and are captured. Max finds a way to blow up the lab with Zharko and Bruce inside. Note: The title is a parody of the Judy Carne gag line from Rowan & Martin's Laugh-In, "Sock it to me!"
109	23	"Leadside"	Gary Nelson	Lloyd Turner and Whitey Mitchell	March 8, 1969	109
At the National Museum, wheelchair-using KAOS agent Leadside (Ronald Long) is there to steal items. His accomplices Norman (Paul Carr) and Kelley (Annazette Chase) are there to help. While Norman and Kelley are loading the truck, Max arrives to capture Leadside. Leadside vows to escape, then destroy CONTROL and then kill Max. Despite Max not thinking it is possible, Leadside does escape. Back at CONTROL 99 wonders if Leadside could fulfill his promise. It takes some doing, but Chief believes they have Washington sealed off and Leadside can not get out. Leadside does get out of the city. Norman has set in motion Leadside's plan to destroy CONTROL. Chief wants to use CONTROL's super computer, AARDVARC, to figure out Leadside's next move. When AARDVARC explodes, Chief realizes that Leadside started phase two. Max wants 99 to move out of the apartment before Leadside attempts to kill him. Chief tells Max that they had his apartment booby trapped. Max accidentally set off the booby traps. Norman and Kelley had been hiding in Max's building before it was sealed off. They and Leadside get into Max's apartment. Leadside challenges Max to a sword fight. Things do not go well for Leadside. Note: A parody of Raymond Burr's Ironside.
110	24	"Greer Window"	Edward Ryder	Chris Hayward and Arne Sultan	March 15, 1969	110
Max is shot in his own personal "rear window" while trying to apprehend KAOS agent Kleinschmidt. Chief tells 99 that Max was treated for a flesh wound. Chief also shows Max that his crutches are weapons. Because he is out of commission whilst his gluteus maximus heals, he must stay at home for a couple weeks. Since the TV is not working properly, he passes the time reading magazines and occasionally looking out his window with a pair of binoculars. He looks to see what is going on in the building across the street. By a strange coincidence, however, the case the Chief is working upon involves the people in the Greer Industries office across the street. Otto Greer (Barney Phillips) tells Chief he does not know how the blueprints for the new missile guidance system got out of the office. Chief wants 99 to go to work as Greer's receptionist. Chief needs to know who else has access to the office. It is possible that Greer or his secretary, Miss Parker (Lynn Borden), could be working with KAOS. What Chief does not know is the pen that Greer gave him is a listening device. Thanks to Max's snooping with his binoculars, 99 believes there is a secret entrance to Greer's office. 99 gets into Greer's office, but is caught be Greer and Miss Parker. While Miss Parker guards 99, Greer goes to Max's apartment. Max is able to shoot Greer and 99 overpowers Miss Parker. Eddie Ryder as Leo - TV Repairman. Note: A parody of Hitchcock's Rear Window.
111	25	"The Not-So-Great Escape: Part 1"	Don Adams	Arne Sultan and Chris Hayward	March 22, 1969	111
Over a period of 6 months, 20 CONTROL agents have disappeared, and it is Max's job to protect agent Michael Kendall as he gets on a plane. Unfortunately, Kendall becomes KAOS abductee #21 right from under Max's nose. After the Chief goes missing, Max tries to arrange for himself to be kidnapped in a similar fashion, and uncovers the kidnapping method. It turns out that the CONTROL agents are being housed in a secret prison camp somewhere in New Jersey, which is run by Siegfried and Starker. Max visits the camp undercover as a top-ranking KAOS official in hopes of rescuing the prisoners.: Note: A parody of The Great Escape, and probably also in no small measure of the contemporary television show Hogan's Heroes.
112	26	"The Not-So-Great Escape: Part 2"	Don Adams	Arne Sultan and Chris Hayward	March 29, 1969	112
Smart's disguise is uncovered and he is captured. He and the Chief try various escape methods, but each time Siegfried appears to have an upper hand causing their attempts to fail. The Chief realizes that there must be an informer in the camp and devises a plan to fool the informer.

=== Season 5 (1969–70) ===
After its move to CBS, the series aired on Friday nights at 7:30 (replacing The Wild Wild West), opposite Let's Make a Deal (ABC) and The High Chaparral (NBC). The opening title sequence was expanded slightly featuring scenes of Washington, D.C., and its accompanying music was jazzed up a bit. Likewise, the font and size of the credits is different from all previous seasons. This was the series' final season.

No. overall	No. in season	Title	Directed by	Written by	Original release date	Prod. code
113	1	"Pheasant Under Glass"	Don Adams	Chris Hayward and Arne Sultan	September 26, 1969	1645–0951
Professor Phineas Pheasant is being held prisoner by KAOS within an impregnable glass dome. Smart and 99 try everything to break the glass but have to flee when KAOS agents discover their rescue attempt. On their way out, 99 reveals to Max that she is pregnant. The Chief organizes another rescue attempt by using a CONTROL operatic singer whose high notes can shatter any type of glass with Max undercover as her accompanying pianist. To further complicate things, Max has to get spray-on plastic surgery: he blew his secret agent cover in the euphoria of finding out that he will be a father. Martin Landau and Phyllis Diller have cameos as Max's plastic surgery results. The opening scene involves Smart, 99, and the Chief in space suits having a secret meeting on the moon, with the Chief announcing that since the Americans have officially landed on the moon, CONTROL is cancelling their moon meetings.
114	2	"Ironhand"	Don Adams	Lloyd Turner and Whitey Mitchell	October 3, 1969	1645–0952
IH Industries acquires KAOS, led by a man with an iron fist named Ironhand. He manages to infiltrate CONTROL headquarters, but did not find what he was looking for: the Anti-Anti-Anti-Missile-Missile plans. The Chief decides the best way to transport the plans to safety is to assign Max and 99 to Operation Baby Buggy Switch. The actual switch involved 12 baby buggies and 16 CONTROL agents, performing an intricate maneuver in the style of a Busby Berkeley number. (It was choreographed by Adams' wife Dorothy Bracken.): Note: A spoof of Ironside.
115	3	"Valerie of the Dolls"	Jay Sandrich	Les Colodny and Ed Haas	October 10, 1969	1645–0953
CONTROL finds out that KAOS is planning to destroy California by using a very powerful bomb whose formula is being delivered in 3 parts. The Chief and Max track down one of the parts to the Valerie School for Expectant Fathers and then enroll as students to find out the method used to deliver the formula. The title is a spoof of Valley of the Dolls.
116	4	"Widow Often Annie"	Charles R. Rondeau	Lloyd Turner and Whitey Mitchell	October 17, 1969	1645–0955
The Chief orders Max to romance and betroth Ann Cameron, a beautiful widow suspected of murdering her 12 CONTROL agent husbands for their life insurance money, which she then donates to KAOS. Unfortunately, the wedding coincides with The Smarts' first wedding anniversary, much to 99's dismay.: Note: The title is a spoof of Little Orphan Annie.
117	5	"The Treasure of C. Errol Madre"	Don Adams	Chris Hayward and Bob DeVinney	October 24, 1969	1645–0954
KAOS heists 5 straight federal payrolls, putting CONTROL into severe financial straits. The Chief sends Max, disguised as recently-deceased prospector Frogsie Debbs, to Mira Lodo, Mexico, to find Debbs' old partner C. Errol Madre. Debbs and Madre had charted a map leading to a gold find, with each keeping one half of the map until one day they join forces again to get the gold. A successful impersonation of Debbs by Max could recover enough gold to help restore CONTROL's operations. A spoof of The Treasure of the Sierra Madre.: Note: Some of the footage is re-used in "Do I Hear a Vaults?". When Max and Larrabee are in an armored car, Max sees a policeman in sneakers, an ice cream man, and a small boy, who are all CONTROL agents.
118	6	"Smart Fell on Alabama"	Alan Rafkin	Lloyd Turner and Whitey Mitchell	October 31, 1969	1645–0957
Because he failed to retrieve a little red code book from a KAOS courier, Max has to train three skilled convicts (a pickpocket, strongman, and safe-cracker) to break into a highly fortified mansion where the code book is being kept. The mansion just happens to belong to a southern Colonel who owns a successful chain of restaurants. A spoof of Colonel Sanders and the Kentucky Fried Chicken chain he founded.: Note: The title is based on the 1934 jazz standard "Stars Fell on Alabama".
119	7	"And Baby Makes Four: Part 1"	Don Adams	Arne Sultan and Chris Hayward	November 7, 1969	1645–0958
CONTROL has been looking for the location of the new KAOS headquarters for the last 4 months. A new lead has Max doing the surveillance of the bus station on the lookout for KAOS agent Simon the Likable (Jack Gilford), a dangerous operative who has gotten his nickname because he is so seemingly sweet and charming that he captivates everyone and anyone around him into being hopelessly obliging. Simon is to receive directions on how to get to the new headquarters, which is covertly slipped into his trench coat while it rests on a coat hook in a coffee shop. Max receives a call from 99, saying it is time to go to the hospital to give birth. Max rushes out of the coffee shop, taking Simon's coat by mistake. Max had instructions on how to get to the hospital in his coat. Using the wrong map, Max and 99 end up at KAOS's new HQ, a sinister sanctuary, instead of the maternity ward.
120	8	"And Baby Makes Four: Part 2"	Don Adams	Arne Sultan and Chris Hayward	November 14, 1969	1645–0959
Max discovers their destination is actually the new KAOS HQ. Grabbing 99, they manage to escape and head for the maternity hospital with KAOS in hot pursuit. Meanwhile, the Chief and Larabee come up with an ingenious way to subdue Simon the Likable (who had followed Smart's map). Upon Smart's arrival, 99 is sent to the delivery room, but then a showdown ensues in the hospital lobby between CONTROL and KAOS, interrupted twice by announcements for the births of the Smart twins.
121	9	"Physician Impossible"	Alan Rafkin	Lloyd Turner and Whitey Mitchell	November 21, 1969	1645–0956
Max has Big Eddie Little in custody but his friends help him escape. Max is able to wound him but he gets away. While visiting their newborns at the hospital, Max and 99 are mistaken for a doctor and his nurse who are then kidnapped to Eddie's hideout to treat the gunshot wound inflicted by Max.: Note: The title is a spoof of Mission: Impossible.
122	10	"The Apes of Rath"	Richard Benedict	Lloyd Turner and Whitey Mitchell	November 28, 1969	1645–0960
Six CONTROL agents have been murdered in the last month by someone with incredible strength. The only clue is that each agent received a banana in the mail the morning that they were killed. It is soon deduced that the killer is an ape. 99 alerts Max that he has received a banana, prompting the Chief to assign Agent 77, Chuck Armstrong, to protect Max. Unbeknownst to CONTROL, Agent 77 is an ape surgically altered by one Dr. Matthew Rath, who can remotely manipulate 77.: Note 1: The episode title is a play on The Grapes of Wrath.; Note 2: The episode itself is a play on The Murders in the Rue Morgue and King Kong.
123	11	"Age Before Duty"	Harry Falk	Bob DeVinney	December 5, 1969	1645–0962
Max is bewildered when his young 28-year-old contact dies of old age. A disgruntled CONTROL photographer, Felix (John Fiedler), has developed a paint (called "Dorian Gray"), which causes aging once the paint is applied on the photo of the intended target. Rejected by the Chief, Felix shops his dark art to KAOS, which has paid him $100,000. Before long, everyone at CONTROL is aging rapidly, except Larrabee, who has not yet had his ID photo renewed.: Note: The episode is a spoof of The Picture of Dorian Gray and the title is a spoof of the old adage, "age before beauty".
124	12	"Is This Trip Necessary?"	Ron Joy	Dale McRaven	December 12, 1969	1645–0964
KAOS pharmacist Jarvis Pym (Vincent Price) threatens to poison the Washington water supply with a hallucinogenic drug which renders people incapable of functioning. The episode title is from the World War II slogan to limit the amount of wartime travelling.
125	13	"Ice Station Siegfried"	Reza Badiyi	Arne Sultan and Chris Hayward	December 19, 1969	1645–0963
It is August but Max and the Chief are snowed in at Miami. In fact, the weather is unusually erratic all over. The Chief assigns 99 while the CIA assigns Agent Quigley (Bill Dana) -- who is so goofy and naive that he makes Max seem sophisticated in comparison -- to investigate who may be manipulating the weather this way. A lead sends the duo to fictional frozen Wolf Jaw, Canada, where they make contact with two "mounties": Siegfried and Starker. A spoof of Ice Station Zebra.: Note: Don Adams only appears in the cold open of this episode and it is the last episode in which Siegfried appears.
126	14	"Moonlighting Becomes You"	Alan Rafkin	Chris Hayward	January 2, 1970	1645–0961
After 99 objects to doing simple assignments after marriage and motherhood, the Chief assigns her to find out how a radio drama is transmitting coded messages to KAOS.: Note 1: The title comes from the 1942 popular song "Moonlight Becomes You".; Note 2: A spoof of Orson Welles' Mercury Theater.
127	15	"House of Max: Part 1"	Anton M. Leader	Chris Hayward	January 9, 1970	1645–0965
Max and 99 go to London to investigate a modern-day Jack the Ripper, and meet yet another evil wax museum owner. The title is a spoof of House of Wax.: Note: This two-part episode is one of the few in which the Chief (Edward Platt) does not appear at all, nor is he mentioned at any point. It is also the last episode split into parts in the original series.
128	16	"House of Max: Part 2"	Anton M. Leader	Chris Hayward	January 16, 1970	1645–0966
After surviving an attack by a wax werewolf, Max covertly infiltrates the wax museum. He poses as a wax sculpture of Hitler in order to catch Duval in the act of bringing his waxworks (some of which include W.C. Fields and Laurel and Hardy) to life in order to kill.
129	17	"Rebecca of Funny-Folk Farm"	Charles R. Rondeau	Lloyd Turner and Whitey Mitchell	January 23, 1970	1645–0967
Max drops a courier package from a plane and it lands on the roof of a mansion. In an effort to retrieve the package, caught in the pouring rain, Max and 99 seek a temporary refuge from the elements and have to deal with the kooky inhabitants. The sadistic châtelaine, Mrs. Van Hooten (Gale Sondergaard), thinks 99 is her long-lost sister Rebecca, for whom 99 is indeed a doppelgänger. As a curiosity in the episode, Max is asked why he calls his wife "99", to which he responds that he does not know what her real name is.: Note: The title is a spoof of Rebecca of Sunnybrook Farm.
130	18	"The Mess of Adrian Listenger"	Charles R. Rondeau	Chris Hayward	January 30, 1970	1645–0969
While attending the funeral of the latest CONTROL Agent who was mysteriously killed, Max, 99, and The Chief are shocked to find a carved headstone with Max's name on it. It is believed that Adrian Listenger, a CONTROL spy school dropout, is taking his revenge by systematically killing off agents who got him expelled — and his hit list includes both Max and the Chief. Guest star Pat Paulsen as "Ace Weems/Adrian Listenger".: Note:A spoof of The List of Adrian Messenger.
131	19	"Witness for the Execution"	Alan Rafkin	Lloyd Turner and Whitey Mitchell	February 6, 1970	1645–0968
KAOS agent Dietrich has decided to defect and become an informant. Although this is good news, the Chief is still concerned, seeing that no KAOS defector has ever lived long enough to testify. With the Smarts' nanny unavailable, the Chief's plan is to have Dietrich disguised as the nanny and staying with Max. The local KAOS branch hires the Exterminator (William Schallert), a top assassin (and accountant) for hire, who uses his arsenal of booby traps, arrows, and bombs to try to kill Dietrich.: Note: A spoof of Witness for the Prosecution.
132	20	"How Green Was My Valet"	Dick Carson	Gloria Burton	February 13, 1970	1645–0970
Max and 99 pose as valet and maid at the Bulmanian Embassy in order to recover a stolen sample of rocket fuel. Meanwhile, Larabee and the Chief have to babysit the twins... with hilarious results. The title is a play on How Green Was My Valley.: Note 1: A spoof of National Velvet.; Note 2: Jonathan Harris guest stars as KAOS Agent/Bulmanian Ambassador.
133	21	"And Only Two Ninety-Nine"	Don Adams	Arne Sultan	February 20, 1970	1645–0971
Max comes home from work one evening to find 99 in bed, with a black eye. She's actually an impostor — the real 99 (who gave her the black eye) was kidnapped by KAOS but had escaped, and was now with the Chief — but the Chief orders Max to pretend that he's taken in by the deception and for 99 to return to captivity, the better to figure out what KAOS is up to.: Note: This episode completes a "trilogy" centered around doubles villains for the three main characters of Get Smart (Max, the Chief and 99). The others are "Too Many Chiefs" (episode #11) and "The Spy Who Met Himself" (episode #63).
134	22	"Smartacus"	Charles R. Rondeau	Lloyd Turner and Whitey Mitchell	February 27, 1970	1645–0972
Max and the Chief investigate a series of security leaks that seem to be connected to a chain of Roman Bath spas.: Note 1: A spoof of Spartacus.; Note 2: Guest starring Ronald Long as Montague Leach.; Note 3: CBS placed Get Smart on a rare nearly two-month hiatus after "Smartacus" due to its low ratings. The decision was made that the series would not be renewed after the last four episodes following, which were probably already in pre-production in that time.
135	23	"What's It All About, Algie?"	Don Adams	Arne Sultan and Chris Hayward	April 24, 1970	1645–0976
Max poses as a gardener to infiltrate a nursery that is selling plants with hidden surveillance bugs to key people in Washington. The nursery's owner, Algie DeGrasse, starts to suspect that Max is actually from CONTROL and plans to feed him to his newest acquisition: a giant man-eating plant.: Note 1: A spoof of Alfie.; Note 2: John van Dreelen guest stars as KAOS Agent Algie DeGrasse.
136	24	"Hello, Columbus – Goodbye, America"	Alan Rafkin	Pat McCormick	May 1, 1970	1645–0975
CONTROL has learned that the direct descendant of Christopher Columbus, Gino Columbus, is the rightful owner of the United States. Max is assigned to guard Gino once he flies into Washington and meets with the President to sign the country back over. However, Max and Gino are captured by KAOS, who would prefer that Gino sign over America to KAOS.: Note: A spoof of Goodbye, Columbus.
137	25	"Do I Hear a Vaults?"	Alan Rafkin	Chris Hayward	May 8, 1970	1645–0974
The Chief meets Smart at a public library to recover a special book. The book is a master list of CONTROL agents but its hiding place has now been compromised. Max and Larrabee transport the book in an armored car to a bank vault, but Max accidentally locks the vault door on both the Chief and Larrabee. As the vault only has a limited amount of air, Max and 99 decide to get an imprisoned safecracker (named "Baffles", a spoof of Raffles) but come back with a convicted master forger instead. Will the Chief and Larrabee be freed in time?: Note: The title is a spoof of Do I Hear a Waltz?.
138	26	"I Am Curiously Yellow"	Nick Webster	Lloyd Turner and Whitey Mitchell	May 15, 1970	1645–0973
While investigating a villain known as the Whip, Max is hypnotized by his small and special Chinese gong to obey his every command at specific times. Max is eventually instructed to steal the NARCO 5–12, a powerful prototype weapon, from the Chief's safe. When the Chief confronts Max about the theft, he has no recollection of it.: Note 1: The title is a spoof of I Am Curious (Yellow), but as a possible reference to the "Yellow Peril" in the comic context of the episode.; Note 2: Series finale, the episode ends with Larabee using the gong to hypnotize the Chief and thereby securing promotions for himself.

== Home media ==
Title	Company	Release date
Get Smart – The Complete Series	Time–Life	November 21, 2006
Get Smart – Season 1	HBO	August 5, 2008
Get Smart – The Complete Series Gift Set	HBO	November 4, 2008
Get Smart – Season 2	HBO	March 10, 2009
Get Smart – Season 3	HBO	June 9, 2009
Get Smart – Season 4	HBO	October 6, 2009
Get Smart – Season 5	HBO	December 8, 2009
