= Get Smart (disambiguation) =

Get Smart is an American comedy television series that ran from 1965 to 1970.

Get Smart may also refer to:

== Get Smart franchise based on the 1965–1970 television series ==
(Chronological)

- The Nude Bomb, aka The Return of Maxwell Smart (1980), out-of-continuity feature film based on the 1965–1970 series
- Get Smart, Again! (1989), a made-for-TV movie follow-up to the 1965–1970 series
- Get Smart (1995 TV series), a 1995 revival of the television series
- Get Smart (film), a 2008 feature film based on the series
- Get Smart's Bruce and Lloyd: Out of Control, a 2008 feature film serving as a companion to the above film

== Music ==
- Get Smart! (band), a 1980s alternative rock band
- "Get Smart", a song by Cinerama from Torino

== Other ==
- Get Smart, a campaign by the Centers for Disease Control and Prevention to prevent unnecessary use of antibiotics which may cause antibiotic resistance
- "Get Smart" (Dorothy and the Wizard of Oz), a 2018 television episode
