= King Moody =

American actor (1929–2001)

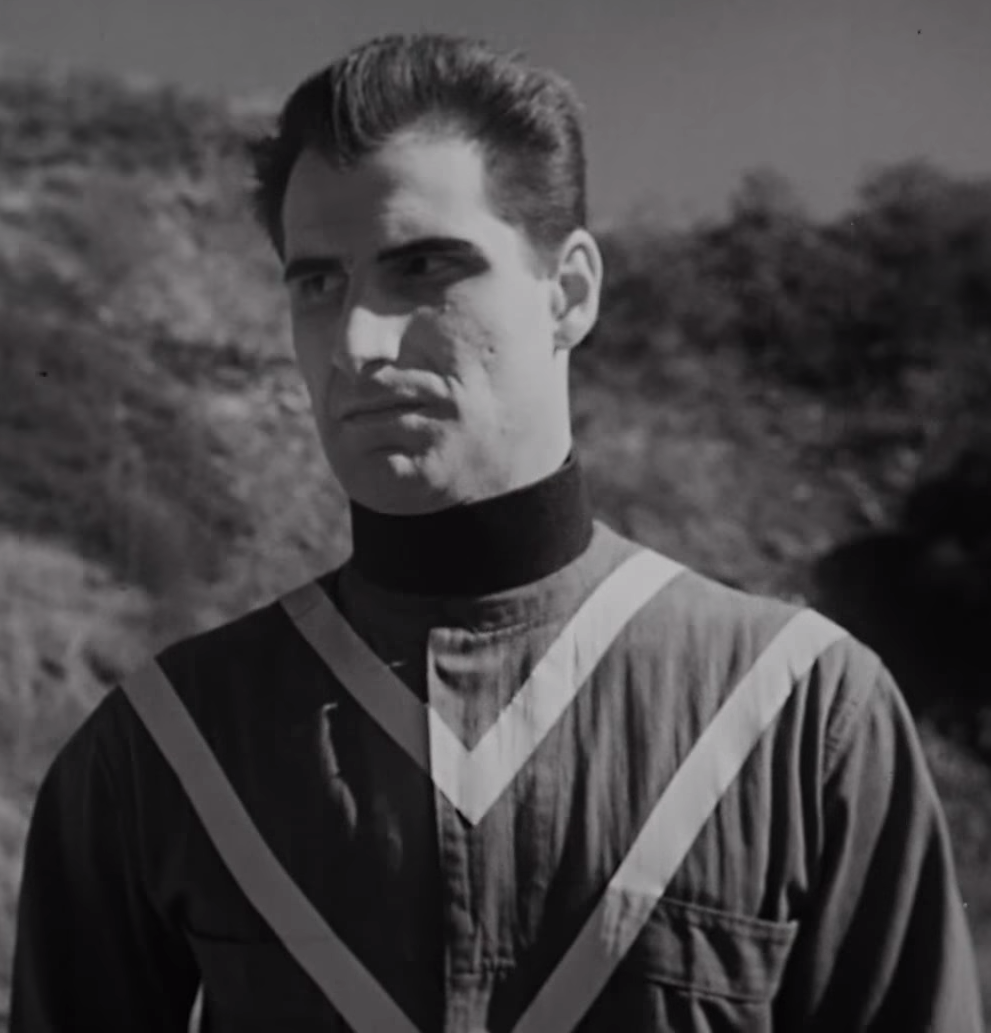
- Moody as Spacecraft Captain in Teenagers from Outer Space (1959)
- Born: December 6, 1929; New York City, New York, U.S.
- Died: February 7, 2001 (aged 71); Tarzana, California, U.S.
- Occupation: Actor
- Years active: 1959–1992
- Spouses: Rachel Rosenthal (m. 1960; div. 1979) Jacqueline L. Larson (m. 1981; div. 1984)

Robert "King" Moody (December 6, 1929 – February 7, 2001) was an American film, television and theatre actor, best known for playing Starker on the television comedy spy series Get Smart and for his televised portrayal of McDonald's' advertising spokesperson Ronald McDonald from 1969 to 1985.

== Early life ==
Moody was born in New York City on December 6, 1929.

== Career ==
"Starker, this is KAOS!" from Get Smart episode Snoopy Smart vs. the Red Baron

=== Film ===
Moody appeared in over a dozen feature films from 1959 to 1992, starting with Teenagers From Outer Space in 1959, where he played an alien spaceship captain. Others included supporting roles in The Glass Cage, an American entry at the International Film Festival in San Francisco in 1961, The Nun and the Sergeant in 1962, Five Minutes to Love in 1963, Sweet November and The Shakiest Gun in the West, both in 1968, and The Nutt House in 1992, his final film role. He also played minor roles in Any Wednesday in 1966 and Get to Know Your Rabbit in 1972.

=== Television ===
Moody had guest roles on numerous network television shows from 1960 to 1991, beginning with three episodes of the underwater adventure series Sea Hunt. Others included Combat! in 1964, The Man from U.N.C.L.E. in 1966, The High Chaparral in 1967, Bonanza in 1967 and 1968, The Good Guys and Mannix, both in 1969, The Bob Newhart Show and Mission: Impossible, both in 1972, Starsky & Hutch in 1976, Little House on the Prairie in 1978, CHiPs in 1983, Quantum Leap in 1989, and Thirtysomething in 1991. In 1973, he was in the TV movie Message to My Daughter.

In 1970, Moody performed on the televised one act satire We Can Make Our Lives Sublime on Repertoire Workshop, a CBS series. Written by Norman J. Fedder, Moody acted in the supporting role alongside Barbara Sharma, who played the wacky newspaper columnist doling misguided advice.

Starker

Moody's most noted role was on Get Smart, appearing as KAOS henchman Starker (pictured), the "dummkopf" sidekick to Siegfried, played by Bernie Kopell, although he appeared in other guest roles on the series from 1966 to 1969. Moody played Starker comically as an expressive childish buffoon in keeping with the tone of the show. The expression "Starker, this is KAOS!", spoken abruptly by his KAOS boss, was a trope used whenever the character demonstrated such buffoonery.

In 1989, Moody reprised the role, along with most of the original cast, in the TV movie Get Smart, Again!.

=== Theatre ===
Moody performed in improvisational theatre in Los Angeles, California in the early-1960s with wife and creative partner Rachel Rosenthal and her repertory company, Instant Theatre, which she founded prior to going commercial with it in 1963. Touted as "Zany! Bad, Provocative!" or described as "improvisation with a difference", Friday and Saturday evening shows were performed weekly at the Horseshoe Theatre in Hollywood, California. Added in 1964 were Sunday matinees for kids titled Instant Fairy Tales, with advertisements boasting "a different story every week" and none repeated. The shows ran until 1966 when Rosenthal developed knee pain from the physical demands of performing and had to withdraw. In 1977, shows were resumed, at Hollywood Center Theater in Hollywood, again with two evening shows and one matinee for the kids. Revues were good but ticket sales could not cover costs, so production ended.

In 1986, Moody played one of the three main characters in the Mario Fratti penned play, Victim, which was a recasting of a 1982 Los Angeles production, and ran for twenty-two shows at the Willows Theatre in Concord, California. Both productions were directed by American actor Lou Wagner of Planet of the Apes fame.

=== Ronald McDonald ===
In 1969, Moody became the fourth actor to portray Ronald McDonald on McDonald's TV commercials, playing the character for seventeen years until 1985. Success with the character came from his experience with Instant Fairy Tales and improvisational performances in front of kids. Remuneration from it made him rich, affording he and his wife Rachel Rosenthal a more comfortable lifestyle than they were used to during their theatrical work years earlier.

== Personal life ==
Moody married performance artist and collaborative partner Rachel Rosenthal in 1960, whom he met in 1958, and remained with her until 1979. They had no children. In 1981, he married his second wife, Jacqueline L. Larson, with this union ending in 1984.

== Death ==
Moody died on February 7, 2001 in Tarzana, California at the age of 71.

== Filmography ==
Includes performances in film, television and theatre.

=== Film ===
Year	Title	Role	Notes
1959	Teenagers from Outer Space	Spaceship Captain	
1961	The Glass Cage	Tox Milner	
1962	The Nun and the Sergeant	Pollard	
1962	Terror at Black Falls	Billy, barroom tough-guy	
1963	Five Minutes to Love	Blowhard	
1966	Any Wednesday	Milkman	
1968	The Destructors	Patch	
1968	P.J.	Thorson Friend	Uncredited
1968	Sweet November	Digby	
1968	The Shakiest Gun in the West	Ernie	Uncredited
1970	The Strawberry Statement	TV Newscaster	
1970	Which Way to the Front?	Checkpoint Guard #2	Uncredited
1972	Get to Know Your Rabbit	TV Reporter	
1989	Wedding Band	Detective	
1991	The Dark Backward	Twinkee Doodle	
1992	The Nutt House	Victor Kaplan	Final film role

=== Television ===
Year	Title	Role	Notes
1960–1961	Sea Hunt	Consul Baumer, Dr. Herschel, Heinrich Maus	3 episodes
1964	Combat!	Jouvet	Episode: "Silver Service"
1966	The Man from U.N.C.L.E.	guest star, THRUSH heavy	2 episodes
1966–1969	Get Smart	Markovich, Kirsch/Y11, Starker, KAOS Scientist	10 episodes
1967	The High Chaparral	Frank Gore	Episode: "Sudden Country"
1967–68	Bonanza	Carter, Charlie	3 episodes
1969	Mannix	John O'Keefe	Episode: "Odds Against Donald Jordan"
1969	The Good Guys		Episode: "Winer, Diner, and Mover"
1969–1985	McDonaldland	Ronald McDonald	74 episodes
1972	The Bob Newhart Show	Deputy Fire Chief Barnsdale, Ken Willet	2 episodes
1972	Mission: Impossible	Det. Lt. Bruce Leonard	Episode: "Cocaine"
1973	Message to My Daughter	Frank	ABC Movie of the Week
1976	Starsky & Hutch	Nicholas Allen Edwards	Episode: "Little Girl Lost"
1976	Holmes & Yoyo	Clay Dorsey	Episode: "The Last Phantom"
1978	Little House on the Prairie	Otto Schiller	Episode: "Harriet's Happenings"
1983	CHiPs	Capt. Burke	2 episodes
1989	Get Smart, Again!	Starker	TV movie
1989	Night Court	Mike Wilson Sr.	Episode: "Life with Buddy"
1989	Quantum Leap	Southern Senator	Episode: "Honeymoon Express - April 27, 1960"
1991	Switched at Birth	Dr. Zelf	TV miniseries
1991	Thirtysomething	TV Evangelist	Episode: "Sifting the Ashes"

=== Theatre ===
Year	Title	Role	Notes
1964–66 and 1977	Instant Theatre and Instant Fairy Tales	various roles	A live weekly improvisation for adults and kids, produced and directed with creative partner Rachel Rosenthal at the Horseshoe Theatre in Hollywood, California
1986	Victim	Diana's husband	Written by Mario Fratti. Performed at the Willows Theatre in Concord, California for 22 performances. Directed by Lou Wagner

== Notes, citations and sources ==
=== Sources ===
Books

- Terrace, Vincent (2011). Encyclopedia of Television Shows, 1925 through 2010 (2nd ed.). Jefferson, N.C.: McFarland & Company, Inc., Publishers. p. 386. ISBN 978-0-7864-6477-7.

News

- "Fortune In Jewels Sought After In 'Sea Hunt'". Vol. 88, no. 71. The Daily Herald. 7 Nov 1960. p. 30 – via Newspaper.com. ""Henrik Maas (King Moody), only survivor of the shipwreck"
- "Sea Hunt". Vol. LXXX, no. 21. The Los Angeles Times. 30 Apr 1961. p. 30 – via Newspaper.com. "German consul (King Moody) on a Caribbean island hires Mike to salvage a kit from a sunken Nazi plane."
- Knickerbocker, Paine (1 Nov 1961). "How Paul Lewis Made 'Glass Cage'". Vol. 97, no. 305. San Francisco Chronicle. p. 41 – via Newspaper.com. "Our picture stars John Hoyt, Arline Sax, Robert Kelljan, King Moody, and Elisha Cook."
- "Weekend of Drama and a Cartoon". The San Francisco Examiner. 13 Nov 1961. p. 30 – via Newspaper.com. "with Arlene Sax, Robert Keljan, John Hoyt and King Moody."
- "Rachel Rosenthal & King Moody Present Instant Theatre". The Los Angeles Times. 10 May 1964. p. 436 – via Newspaper.com. "Every performance completely improvised. Zany! Mad! Provocative!"
- Mitchell, Gee (26 Dec 1966). "'Any Wednesday' Amusing Comedy". Vol. 90, no. 109. Dayton Daily News. p. 80 – via Newspaper.com. "Ann Prentiss, Jack Fletcher and King Moody are especially effective in some of the roles created for the film."
- Robinson, Johnny (30 Sep 1967). "Video Versions". Vol. 107. Sun-Journal. p. 12 – via Newspaper.com. "The cast includes Mike De Anda as Quail, Carlos Rivas as Miguel, Todolfo Hoyos as Emiliano, Ray Teal as Sheriff Coffee, Clyde Howdy as Boke, King Moody as Charlie"
- Cooksey, Gordon (2 Jun 1968). "Don Knotts Stars In 'Shakiest Gun'". Vol. 39, no. 1. The Columbus Ledger. p. 16 – via Newspaper.com. "Sandy Dennis, Oscar winner for her performance in "Who's Afraid of Virginia Woolf," heads the cast of "Sweet November." Others prominent in the cast are Sandy Baron, Burr DeBenning, Marj Dusay, King Moody, Jack Donner and Martin West."
- "Sea Hunt—Adventure". Northwest-Signal. 3 Aug 1970. p. 6 – via Newspaper.com. "Mike: Lloyd Bridges. Dr. Herschel: King Moody. Dr. Wells: Noel Drayton."
- "Repertoire Workshop". Vol. 95, no. 277. Ventura County Star. 9 Aug 1970. p. 6 – via Newspaper.com. ""We Can Make Our Lives Sublime." Barbara Sharma, King Moody, Harrison Page, Patrecia Wynand, Tomiwitta Moore and George Bledsoe star"
- "Satirical Play on CBS Today". Vol. 100, no. 192. The Bayonne Times. 15 Aug 1970. p. 5 – via Newspaper.com. ""We Can Make Our Lives Sublime, a one-act satire about newspaper columnist whose misguided advice...resulted in chaos"
- Skwira, Gregory (8 Sep 1974). "Ronald McDonald: The Secret Business Of Being a Hero". Detroit Free Press. p. 21 – via Newspaper.com. "with the exception of THE top banana-actor King Moody, who plays Ronald on the company's television commercials."
- Emmons, Steve (9 Jan 1977). "Ronald McDonald: Child's Hero, Ad Man's Bonanza". Vol. XCVI. The Los Angeles Times. p. 1,3 – via Newspaper.com. "Actor King Moody. He has been the sole TV Ronald since 1969."
- "Instant Theatre in Hollywood". Vol. XCVI. The Los Angeles Times. 24 Jun 1977. p. 90 – via Newspaper.com. "Rachel Rosenthal and King Moody's Instant Theater is improvisation with a difference fully staged and orchestrated scenes performed by a full company"
- Stayton, Richard J. (9 Jun 1981). "Rachael Rosenthal Confronts Her Beasts". Vol. 3, no. 31. LA Weekly. p. 8 – via Newspaper.com. "Suddenly they were rich. His experience with Instant Fairy Tales helped him to win the role of Ronald McDonald."
- Lerner, Eric (1 Sep 1981). "It's murder most clever in 'Victim'". Vol. CXII, no. 122. Los Angeles Herald Examiner. p. 8 – via Newspaper.com. "The play is the West Coast premiere of "Victim" by Mario Fratti, a contemporary murder mystery-thriller"
- Wingo, Tony (9 Apr 1983). "Will actor Lou Wagner overhaul the Wingomobile?". Vol. CXIII, no. 99. Los Angeles Herald Examiner. p. 5 – via Newspaper.com. "Lou Wagner, proudest of his work in directing "Victim." by Mario Fratti"
- "Premier at Willows". Martinez News-Gazette. 9 Oct 1986. p. 5 – via Newspaper.com. "King Moody's film and television experience is vast and includes recurring roles on "Chips," "Get Smart" and "He & She""
- Corr, Pat (30 Oct 1986). "Two Hits And A Miss Last Weekend". Martinez News-Gazette. p. 5 – via Newspaper.com. "King Moody is Diana's stern, older husband, at times seeming as mad as his patient Kirk. Lou Wagner directed the play."
- "The Romantic Thriller". Oakland Tribune. 7 Nov 1986. p. 39 – via Newspaper.com. "'Victim' takes a jovial sidetrack in this scene with Richard DeCoit, left, and King Moody at the Willows Theatre"
- Benson, Jim (24 Feb 1989). "Would you believe 'Get Smart' is back?". Grand Forks Herald. p. 24 – via Newspaper.com. "King Moody as that KAOS dummkopf Shtarker"
- Starr, Michael (7 Feb 1995). "'Get Smart' gets desperate". The Herald-News. p. 27 – via Newspaper.com. ""Starker! This is KAOS!"... those words packed a comedic wallop, a verbal roundhouse delivered by evil KAOS chief Siegfried (Bernie Kopell) to his dimwitted "Get Smart" sidekick, Starker (King Moody)."
- Dunham, Mike (8 Mar 1996). "The Arts: A Woman". Anchorage Daily News. p. 64 – via Newspaper.com. "the group disbanded in 1957. The next year, Rosenthal met King Moody, an actor with an enormous gift for visual projection."
- Fox, Margalit (19 May 2015). "Rachel Rosenthal, 88, bold performance artist". The Boston Globe. p. B8 – via Newspaper.com. "Ms. Rosenthal's marriage to King Moody ended in divorce. She leaves no immediate family members."
- Majkowski, Blaise (11 Sep 2015). "Blaise's Bad Movie Guide". Daily Hampshire Gazette. p. h27 – via Newspaper.com. "this out-of-the-world gem stars the future Ronald McDonald (King Moody) as the captain of an alien space ship"

Publications

- "Rachel Rosenthal". Omni. 14 (11): 57–58. Aug 1992.

Websites

- "Sweet November". AppleTV. 2009.
- "Origins Of Ronald McDonald & McDonaldland". Beneath The Golden Arches (Archived). SimonsWebsite.co.uk. 2008. Archived from the original on 2012-02-25.
- "Combat: Silver Service". Aveleyman.com. Internet Archive. Archived from the original on 13 Dec 2019. "King Moody - Jouvet"
- "The Nun and the Sergeant". Aveleyman.com. Internet Archive. Archived from the original on 15 Dec 2019. "King Moody - Pollard"
- "Get to Know Your Rabbit". Turner Classic Movies. Internet Archive. Archived from the original on 18 Oct 2020. "King Moody - Pollard"
- "The Shakiest Gun in the West". Aveleyman.com. Internet Archive. Archived from the original on 5 Mar 2021. "King Moody - Ernie"
- "King Moody". Aveleyman.com. Internet Archive. Archived from the original on 10 Jun 2021. "King Moody: Friday, 6th December 1929—Wednesday, 7th February 2001"
- "Five Minutes to Love". AppleTV. 2026.
- "Message to My Daughter". AppleTV. 2026.
- "Harriet's Happening". AppleTV. 2026.
- "Tracy Grammar School, I'll Lick You Yet". AppleTV. 2026.
- "His Busiest Season". AppleTV. 2026.
- "Honeymoon Express". AppleTV. 2026.
- "The Minus X Affair". AppleTV. 2026.
- "Mario Fratti: Plays". MarioFratti.com.
