= Marvin Worth =

American film director (1925–1998)

- Born: June 6, 1925; Brooklyn, New York
- Died: April 22, 1998 (aged 72); Los Angeles, California
- Other names: Film producer, screenwriter, actor
- Spouse: Joan Worth (ca. 1954 – April 22, 1998)

Marvin Worth (June 6, 1925 – April 22, 1998) was an American film producer, screenwriter and actor. His efforts to bring the biography of Malcolm X to the big screen started in 1967, when he purchased the rights to The Autobiography of Malcolm X, and eventually led to the production of the 1972 documentary, for which he received an Oscar nomination. Later on, he would produce Malcolm X, with director Spike Lee. He was nominated for an Oscar for producing Lenny in 1974.

== Early life and career ==
Worth's career began at a very early age when he began promoting jazz concerts, which led to relationship with many artists. At one time, he managed the musical careers of Charlie Parker and Billie Holiday. Later, Worth's employment as an agent branched into comedy, and he took on contentious comedian Lenny Bruce. In the 1950s, he forged a partnership with Arne Sultan and began writing material for Bruce. The duo went on to pen the scripts for Three on a Couch and Boys' Night Out and the story for Promise Her Anything. In 1958, Worth won a Peabody Award for his writing on The Steve Allen Show.

In 1971, Worth brought the story of Lenny Bruce to Broadway in the production Lenny, which won a Tony Award for its star, Cliff Gorman.(Internet Broadway Database) In 1974 the movie version of Lenny directed by Bob Fosse was released and received multiple Academy Award nominations. For the remainder of his career, Worth continued to produce biopics including the 1979 film The Rose (loosely based on Janis Joplin), the 1996 television movie Norma Jean & Marilyn, the 1998 television movie Gia, and the 2001 television movie James Dean.

== Personal life and death ==
Worth was married to his wife Joan, an artist, for 44 years. They had three children. On April 22, 1998, Worth died of bronchioloalveolar carcinoma, a form of lung cancer, in Los Angeles.

== Selected filmography ==
He was a producer in all films unless otherwise noted.

=== Film ===
Year	Film	Notes
1970	Where's Poppa?	
1974	Lenny	
1977	Fire Sale	
1979	The Rose	
1980	Up the Academy	
1982	Soup for One	
1984	Unfaithfully Yours	
1984	Rhinestone	
1984	Falling in Love	
1987	Less than Zero	Uncredited
1988	Patty Hearst	
1989	See No Evil, Hear No Evil	
1990	Flashback	
1992	Malcolm X	
1996	Diabolique	Final film as a producer

As an actor

Year	Film	Role
1977	Fire Sale	Milton

As writer

Year	Film	Notes
1962	Boys' Night Out	
1965	Promise Her Anything	
1966	Three on a Couch	
1979	The Rose	Uncredited
1989	See No Evil, Hear No Evil	

Miscellaneous crew

Year	Film	Role
1984	Rhinestone	Presenter

=== Television ===
Year	Title	Credit	Notes	Other notes
1966	Vacation Playhouse			
1971	The Sheriff	Executive producer		Television film
1979	Where's Poppa?	Executive producer		Television pilot
1992	Running Mates			Television film
1996	Norma Jean & Marilyn	Executive producer		Television film
1998	Gia	Executive producer		Television film
1998	Criminal Law			Television film
2001	James Dean	Executive producer	Uncredited	Television film

As writer

Year	Title	Notes
1956	Stanley	
1956	Washington Square	
1957	The Polly Bergen Show	
1957	General Motors 50th Anniversary Show	Television special
1958	The Dinah Shore Chevy Show	
1959−60	The Steve Allen Show	
1960	The Chevy Show	
1961	The New Steve Allen Show	
1962	The Steve Allen Playhouse	
1963−64	The Judy Garland Show	
1965	Get Smart	
1966	The Milton Berle Show	

Script and continuity department

Year	Title
1963	The Judy Garland Show

Thanks

Year	Title	Role	Notes
1993	But... Seriously	Thanks	Documentary

== Award nominations ==
Year	Award	Result	Category	Film or series
1973	Academy Award	Nominated	Best Documentary, Features	Malcolm X (Shared with Arnold Perl)
1975	Academy Award	Nominated	Best Picture	Lenny
1998	Emmy Award	Nominated	Outstanding Made for Television Movie	Gia (Shared with James D. Brubaker, David R. Ginsburg, and Ilene Kahn)
1985	Golden Raspberry Award	Nominated	Worst Picture	Rhinestone (Shared with Howard Smith)
