= General Motors 50th Anniversary Show =

- Written by: Helen Deutsch; Richard DeRoy (special material); Arne Sultan (special material); Marvin Worth (special material)
- Directed by: Charles S. Dubin
- Music by: Bernard Green
- Country of origin: United States
- Original language: English

Production
- Producer: Jess Oppenheimer
- Running time: 120 minutes

Original release
- Release: November 17, 1957

General Motors 50th Anniversary Show is a 1957 television special, broadcast live and in color on NBC-TV, directed by Charles S. Dubin, produced by Jess Oppenheimer, and written by Helen Deutsch.

== Plot ==
A celebration and contemplation on the theme of "The Pursuit of Happiness" written by Helen Deutsch and hosted by Kirk Douglas and Ernest Borgnine, including drama, comedy and music. Highlights included: Pat Boone singing "Where Are You?" in a Mardi Gras scene in a skit called "The Sad Lover." A comedy sketch with Eddie Bracken and Hans Conried called "Poor Charlie: the Book Store," including Alice Ghostley, Dennis Joel and Tirrell Barbery as Charlie's wife, Ethel, and children Andy and Julie. Dan Dailey, Carol Burnett, Steve Lawrence and Chita Rivera in a comedy song and dance sketch entitled "Past and Future". "Mr. Boland's Afternoon", a dramatic sketch with Don Ameche and Peg Lynch. "Firsts," a comedy sketch with Claudette Colbert and Kent Smith. "The Bridge" a dramatic/musical endeavor with Cyril Ritchard and Claudia Crawford. And singers Howard Keel, Doretta Morrow, Dinah Shore and Dan Dailey, and dancers Jacques D'Amboise, Chita Rivera and Bambi Linn in a potpourri of songs and dances about Love.

== Background and reception ==
General Motors announced in June 1957 that it had commissioned the NBC network to produce a two-hour musical celebration of its 50th anniversary. It was the most viewed television show in the United States for the two-week period ending November 23, 1957, according to the Nielsen ratings, with a 49.4% audience share, and 19,858,000 homes tuned in. Jack Gould of The New York Times reviewed the show positively, calling it a "superb musical production, rewardingly experimental in approach, delightfully humorous and touchingly poignant. It was artistic television of a high order."

The special was nominated for an Emmy for Primetime Emmy Award for Program of the Year, (won that year by The Comedian (Playhouse 90)) and was also nominated for Best Live Camera Work.

An album was released on RCA Victor containing performances from the special.

== Cast ==
- June Allyson ... Emily Webb (in "Our Town")
- Don Ameche ... Henry Sylvester Bowdoin
- Pat Boone ... Young Man at the Mardi Gras
- Ernest Borgnine ... Himself - Narrator
- Eddie Bracken ... Charlie Smith
- Carol Burnett ... Ruth Swanson
- Claudette Colbert ... Mrs. Harry Collier
- Hans Conried ... Bookseller
- Claudia Crawford ... Melinda
- Jacques d'Amboise ... Himself
- Dan Dailey ... Bill
- Kirk Douglas ... Himself - Host/Narrator
- John Fiedler ... Milkman (in "Our Town")
- Alice Ghostley ... Ethel Smith
- John Gibson ... Mr. Webb (in "Our Town")
- Helen Hayes ... Herself
- Dennis Olivieri ... Andy Smith
- Howard Keel ... Himself
- Steve Lawrence ... Tom
- Lynn Loring ... Judy Collier
- Bambi Linn ... Herself
- Peg Lynch ... Mrs. Henry Sylvester Bowdoin
- Carmen Mathews ... Myrtle Webb (in "Our Town")
- Doretta Morrow ... Herself
- Cyril Ritchard ... Orlando B. Courtwright
- Chita Rivera ... South Seas Island Dream Girl
- Louis Scholle ... Dick Collier
- Dinah Shore ... Herself
- Kent Smith ... Harry Collier
- Tirrell Barbery ... Julia

== Filming locations ==
NBC Studios, 30 Rockefeller Plaza, New York City, New York, USA
