= Mr. Big (Get Smart) =

- Get Smart episode
- Episode no.: Season 1 Episode 1
- Directed by: Howard Morris
- Written by: Mel Brooks; Buck Henry
- Production code: 001
- Original air date: September 18, 1965
- Running time: 26 min.

Episode chronology
← Previous —	Next → "Diplomat's Daughter"

"Mr. Big" is the first episode of the first season of Get Smart and originally aired by NBC on September 18, 1965. In it, Maxwell Smart must rescue Professor Dante, whose device (the Enthermo) is being used by KAOS to menace the world. Max is told to rescue the professor, and bring back the Enthermo.

Produced as the pilot episode of the series, this episode was filmed in black and white in early 1965. All other episodes that followed were in color.

== Plot ==
While attending a concert, Agent 86 Maxwell Smart (Don Adams) is called on his shoe-phone by the Chief (Edward Platt) and told to immediately go to CONTROL Headquarters. Once there, the Chief tells Max that it is Max's turn to take on a very important CONTROL mission, and he shows Max a photograph; he explains the object pictured is called the Enthermo, and it is a device that can convert heat waves into immense destructive powers. It is then revealed that Mr. Big (Michael Dunn) of KAOS has overseen the kidnapping of Professor Dante (Vito Scotti) - the inventor of the Enthermo - and is demanding $100,000,000 or else he will use the weapon on all the major cities of the World.

After gathering gear he needs, and arranging for Agent K13 (a dog) to accompany him, Max is told that Agent 99 (Barbara Feldon) will meet him at the airport; the agent will reveal their identity with the secret code phrase "New York Mets win double-header". While waiting near the airline ticket/car insurance/car rental counter, Max overhears a young boy repeating a newspaper headline (which Max does not see until after this encounter), "New York Mets Win Double-Header", and asks the boy if he is 99 - "No. I'm six-and-a-half".

Max sits down, sees the newspaper headline for himself, then hears someone utter the code phrase. Thinking he is likely going to be again mistaken, he merely replies, "I know." Agent 99 reveals herself, saying, "You don't understand, the score was 99 to 86."

As they are about to leave, Max notices a man watching them - likely from KAOS - and engages Agent 34 (stowed away in a locker) to implement Plan Y14, allowing 86 and 99 a smooth getaway.

While interviewing an associate of Professor Dante's at the lab from which he was kidnapped, K13 finds what at first appears to be a regular banana peel, but which 99 determines is made of rubber. Max sees that written on it is 'South Street Novelty, Inc.' and speculates that the KAOS kidnappers could have dropped it while struggling with Professor Dante. As the two agents prepare to follow up the strange rubber banana peel lead, they hear an announcement from KAOS over their car radio. At 4:00 p.m. (it is currently 2:20 p.m.), the criminal organization promises, in full view of downtown Manhattan, to "destroy a great public figure" with the Enthermo, in order to prove the device's power.

The novelty store associate, clearly a KAOS agent, is seen on the telephone confirming Max's imminent arrival and setting up a trap which requires Agent 86 to be maneuvered into a specific spot in front of a window. The plan backfires and the KAOS agent is obliterated by an Enthermo beam. Concluding that the beam must have come from the harbour, Max and 99 (whom he has seemingly suddenly realized is a woman) spot a garbage scow, but the distinct lack of seagulls around the craft bring questions to Max's mind; he uses his 'Bino Specs' for a better look and sees that the 'garbage' being hauled is phony and made of rubber. He deduces that the Enthermo and Professor Dante are on the boat.

86, 99, and K13 sneak aboard via a rowboat they procured, but are captured and taken to see Mr. Big, who ironically is revealed to be quite small. While conferring with the crime mastermind, the associate from Professor Dante's lab appears, verifying the sequence of events around Dante's abduction. Max makes use of his 'Inflato Coat to release himself and 99 from captivity, just as they hear the Enthermo being revved up for its 4:00 p.m. demonstration of destruction. From a porthole, the agents see that the target is the Statue of Liberty in New York City.

After Max rescues the professor, the agents engage in a scuffle and successfully dispatch the scow's crew and Dante's former lab colleague. Unable to actually disable the Enthermo, Dante manages to reverse its power; it self-destructs, taking the boat and Mr. Big with it.

Having safely escaped to their rowboat, Max uses his shoe-phone to report to the Chief. After eloquently describing the grand success of their mission, 86 discovers he has dialed the wrong number.

== Production ==
Mel Brooks says he got involved because of Talent Associates (Danny Melnick and David Susskind), who said that they wanted to talk to him about something involving a CIA parody. They suggested a few people, one of them Buck Henry whom Brooks chose as his writer. They wrote a take-off of spy stories, with the idea that they thought that the people running their country were inept, and that they would show the world. It took them 3 1/2 months, because they enjoyed playing pool so much.

The reasons why the pilot episode was filmed in black and white are unknown. However, at that time it was relatively common to do it that way due to the low initial budget and the little development of color television. Before the show was formally accepted by NBC, producer Leonard Stern had the foresight to film the iconic doors sequential scenes of the opening and closing credits in color that were used in all episodes, including the pilot.

Notably, in 1965, the year this episode came out, the New York Mets swept five doubleheaders - on 16 May, 24 May, 28 June, 5 July and 22 August - despite having an otherwise poor overall season record of 50–112.

In this episode, Maxwell Smart's car was a Sunbeam Tiger, that never left the studio lot, which is something Buck Henry makes mention of on the DVD's commentary in 2008. The DVD of the episode shows that the vehicle appears to be a Ferrari 250. Though he carries a .38 caliber revolver in the rest of the series, Max's sidearm in this initial episode is a Beretta M1915 automatic pistol.
