= The Nude Bomb =

1980 film by Clive Donner

- Theatrical release poster
- Directed by: Clive Donner
- Written by: Bill Dana; Arne Sultan; Leonard Stern
- Based on: Get Smart by Mel Brooks and Buck Henry
- Produced by: Jennings Lang
- Starring: Don Adams; Sylvia Kristel; Rhonda Fleming; Dana Elcar; Pamela Hensley; Andrea Howard; Norman Lloyd; Vittorio Gassman
- Cinematography: Harry L. Wolf
- Edited by: Phil Tucker
- Music by: Lalo Schifrin
- Production company: Time Life Films
- Distributed by: Universal Pictures
- Release date: May 9, 1980
- Running time: 94 minutes
- Country: United States
- Language: English
- Budget: $8.5 million
- Box office: $14.7 million

The Nude Bomb (also known as The Return of Maxwell Smart) is a 1980 American spy comedy film based on the 1965–1970 television series Get Smart. It stars Don Adams as Maxwell Smart, Agent 86, and was directed by Clive Donner. It was retitled The Return of Maxwell Smart for television.

== Plot ==
Agent Maxwell Smart is called back into service in order to stop a nefarious KAOS terrorist plan from exploding a bomb that destroys only clothing, so as to leave KAOS as the only supplier of clothes to the entire world. Norman Saint-Sauvage, the KAOS fashion designer, finds everyone else's clothing designs gauche, so he builds a machine capable of cloning his favorite seamstress and implements the Nude Bombs. He wears a costume including thimbles over each finger, and his mountain lair is entered via a giant zipper.

== Cast ==
- Don Adams as Maxwell Smart, Agent 86
- Andrea Howard as Agent 22
- Dana Elcar as The Chief
- Sylvia Kristel as Agent 34
- Vittorio Gassman as Norman Saint-Sauvage / Nino Salvatori Sebastiani
- Norman Lloyd as Carruthers
- Robert Karvelas as Larabee
- Pamela Hensley as Agent 36
- Earl Maynard as Jamaican Delegate
- Joey Forman as Agent 13
- Gary Imhoff as Dr. Jerry Krovney
- Sarah Rush as Dr. Pam Krovney
- Robert Ball as Harrington
- Walter Brooke as American Ambassador
- Vito Scotti as Italian Delegate
- Patrick Gorman as French Delegate
- Alex Rodine as Russian Delegate
- Richard Sanders as German Delegate
- Byron Webster as English Delegate
- Ross Evans as Polish Delegate
- Lawrie Osag as Nigerian Delegate
- Ferdinand Marcos as Philippine Delegate
- Bill Dana as Jonathan Levinson Seigle
- Rhonda Fleming as Edith Von Secondberg
- Thomas Hill as the President
- Ceil Cabot as Landlady
- David Adnopoz as Doctor

== Production ==
Parts of the film were shot in Salt Lake City, Utah. Get Smart co-creators Mel Brooks and Buck Henry had no involvement in the film. Don Adams and Robert Karvelas as Larrabee were the only cast members from the original TV series to reprise their roles for the film. Edward Platt, the original Chief, died in 1974; the Chief in the film is portrayed by Dana Elcar. Eugene Roche was first cast as the Chief, but he fell ill and was replaced by Elcar. Barbara Feldon did not return as Agent 99 from the TV series nor is the character mentioned; Feldon claimed that she was unaware of the film's production and was not asked to reprise the role, surmising that producers wanted to pair Smart with younger women. This fact, taking into account that Max and 99 were married and had two children in the original series, meant that the script had very little continuity from Get Smart. Maxwell Smart (Adams)'s agency, called CONTROL in the TV series, was called PITS in this film, an acronym standing for "Provisional Intelligence Tactical Service".

Sylvia Kristel, at the time known for her appearances in the Emmanuelle erotic film series, makes a brief appearance as Agent 34, with Andrea Howard as Agent 22 (in a role similar to Agent 99) and Vittorio Gassman playing the Ernst Stavro Blofeld-like villain Norman Saint-Sauvage. Joey Forman, who played Harry Hoo in the TV series, was recast as Agent 13. Pamela Hensley, who was then known to science fiction fans for playing Princess Ardala in Buck Rogers in the 25th Century, appeared as Agent 36.

In spite of the title, the film was given a PG rating because there was no frontal nudity in the film; in the opening theme sequence, a title card reads: "Would you believe... a film called The Nude Bomb would get a PG rating". (The PG-13 rating was not created until 1984.) There are five times in the film where the bomb is detonated, but in each case the actors cover up their private areas with strategically placed briefcases by Soviet officials or guns by Buckingham Palace guards or are shown only from the waist up. In one case, members of a football team are in a huddle when a bomb detonates, revealing bare behinds of some of the players. In the final scene, the three stars of the film are rendered nude by fallout from the destruction of all the bombs at the enemy headquarters, but are seen from the backsides from a distance, and then with a "The End" caption covering each of their backsides.

== Release and reception ==
The film was received poorly by critics. It currently stands at a 17% rating on Rotten Tomatoes, based on 18 reviews. It grossed $14.7 million on a $8.5 million budget. The film was nominated for a Golden Raspberry Award for Worst Picture at the 1st Golden Raspberry Awards. On May 23, 1982, NBC broadcast the film on television as part of its Movie of the Week for the first time under an alternate title, The Return of Maxwell Smart.

Nearly a decade later another revival film was produced, this time for TV, on ABC. Get Smart, Again! featured most of the surviving original cast members (including Feldon as Agent 99) and ignored the events that took place in The Nude Bomb in order to maintain continuity with the original series. This was followed by a short-lived revival TV series for Fox. A feature film remake of the series was a box-office success in 2008, grossing $230,685,453 worldwide.

== Home media ==
The movie was released on VHS for the first time by MCA/Universal Home Video in 1991. The film was released on Region 1 DVD on August 26, 2008. and Region 4 on October 30, 2009. It was released in Australia on Blu-ray on June 22, 2016. Kino Lorber released a Blu-ray edition of the film on December 10, 2019, featuring new extras, including TV and radio spots, behind the scenes galleries as well as a commentary track by Alan Spencer, who wrote jokes for Adams on the film's set.
