= Let's Switch! =

1975 television film directed by Alan Rafkin

- Genre: Comedy
- Written by: Peter Lefcourt; Chubby Williams; Sid Arthur; Ruth Brooks Flippen
- Directed by: Alan Rafkin
- Starring: Barbara Eden; Barbara Feldon; Richard Schaal; Pat Harrington Jr. Penny Marshall
- Music by: Harry Geller
- Country of origin: United States
- Original language: English

Production
- Producer: Bruce Johnson
- Production locations: San Fernando Valley, Los Angeles, California
- Cinematography: Stevan Larner
- Editor: Albert J.J. Zuniga
- Running time: 73 minutes
- Production company: Universal Television

Original release
- Network: ABC
- Release: January 7, 1975

Let's Switch! is a 1975 American made-for-television comedy film starring Barbara Eden and Barbara Feldon written by Peter Lefcourt and directed by Alan Rafkin. It premiered as the ABC Movie of the Week on January 7, 1975.

== Plot ==
Lacy Colbert, a housewife, and her best friend Kate Fleming, a glamorous magazine editor, decide to switch lifestyles which creates chaos.

== Cast ==
- Barbara Eden as Lacy Colbert
- Barbara Feldon as Kate Fleming
- Richard Schaal as Ross Daniels
- Pat Harrington Jr. as Randy Colbert
- Penny Marshall as Alice Wright
- Joyce Van Patten as Linette Robin
- Ron Glass as LaRue Williams
