= Rachel Rosenthal =

Performance artist

- Born: November 9, 1926; Paris, France
- Died: May 10, 2015 (aged 88); Los Angeles, California, U.S.
- Occupations: Interdisciplinary; performance artist; teacher; actress; animal rights activist
- Years active: 1955–2015
- Known for: Performance Art
- Notable work: Pangean Dreams
- Spouse: King Moody (m. 1960; div. 1979)
- Awards: J. Paul Getty Fellowship, Vesta Award, Obie Award
- Website: www.rachelrosenthal.org

Rachel Rosenthal (November 9, 1926 – May 10, 2015) was a French-born interdisciplinary and performance artist, teacher, actress, and animal rights activist based in Los Angeles.

Her full-length performance art pieces combined theatre, dance, creative slides and live music. She toured her pieces, with The Rachel Rosenthal Company, to venues both within the United States and abroad. Theatres and festivals she visited include: the Dance Theatre Workshop and Serious Fun! at Lincoln Center in New York City, the Kaaitheater in Brussels, The Internationals Summer Theater Festival in Hamburg, The Performance Space in Sydney and the Festival de Théâtre des Amériques, Théâtre Centaur, Montréal.

== Early life ==
Rosenthal was born on November 9, 1926, in Paris, France, into an assimilated Russian Jewish family. Her father, Léonard Rosenthal, was a merchant of Oriental pearls and precious stones. Her mother was Mara Jacoubovitch Rosenthal.

She described her childhood home as one filled with the works of Monet and Chagall; purchases brought home from her father's travels to Italy. She was three when she started performing and often entertained up to 150 guests at family events, and six when she started learning ballet under the guidance of Russian ballerina Olga Preobrajenska.

During World War II, her family escaped France, moving to Rio de Janeiro, Brazil, via a short stay in Portugal. This journey inspired the creation of her piece, My Brazil. In April 1941, her family left Brazil to settle in New York, where Rosenthal would later graduate from the High School of Music and Art.

Rosenthal studied acting at the Jean-Louis Barrault School of Theatre and with Herbert Berghoff. She was an apprentice of director Erwin Piscator and directed some off-Broadway productions, and was an assistant designer to Heinz Condella at the New York City Opera and danced in Merce Cunningham's company.

After settling back in New York in 1953, her social circle included John Cage, Merce Cunningham, Sari Dienes, Robert Rauschenberg and Jasper Johns. She was introduced to Zen Buddhism and Asian philosophy by Cage. She soon grew an interest in martial arts (kung fu, tai chi, karate) and started training in them.

Improvisation and spontaneity became significantly more important to her and her move in the direction towards experimental theatre was influenced by reading of Antonin Artaud's "The Theatre and Its Double." She returned to visual arts and sculpture as well; creating unique performance art that allowed the freedom to improvise.

In 1955, she moved to California, and became involved with the art scene surrounding the Ferus Gallery. That year she created the experimental "Instant Theatre," within the Cast Theatre (now named El Centro Theatre), performing in and directing it for ten years. She was a leading figure in the L.A. Women's Art Movement in the 1970s and co-founded the Womanspace Gallery, a cooperatively run gallery devoted to work by female artists, in 1973. She is considered one of the "first-generation feminist artists," a group that also includes Mary Beth Edelson, Carolee Schneeman, and Judy Chicago. They were part of the Feminist art movement in Europe and the United States in the early 1970s to develop feminist writing and art. By 1975, she had written, created, directed and acted in more than 30 full-length performances in the United States and Europe. Rosenthal began teaching classes in performance in 1979.

The Others (1984) was her landmark show in which the stage was shared with forty-two animals ranging from goats, snakes to monkeys; all animals had a printed bio and were treated as equals. In 1984 Rosenthal collaborated with fellow performance artist/musician The Dark Bob on KABBALAMOBILE (Words: Rachel Rosenthal, Music: The Dark Bob), presented by the Museum of Contemporary Art, Los Angeles and the Mark Taper Forum. Critic Joan Hugo of Artweek called it "A brilliant tour de force...Kabbalamobile was a Masterpiece". In 1987, she was invited to design a piece specifically for the international art fair, Documenta 8, occurring in Kassel, West Germany. Her original piece for this was Rachel's Brain, with music by Stephen Nachmanovitch. Rachel's Brain dealt with brain research findings, intellectual history and hubris. Alan M. Kriegsman, a writer for the Washington Post, describes her performance as notably magnetic, skillful and sufficient to keep you raptured.

== Marriage ==
She was married to actor King Moody, three years her junior, for 20 years. The couple had no children.

== Later years ==
Rosenthal was the director of the Rachel Rosenthal Company which she formed in 1989 in Los Angeles, California. The company's repertoire deals with themes such as environmental destruction, social justice issues, animal rights, earth-based spirituality, in a hybrid form that combines voice, text, movement, music, video projection, and elaborate theatrical costuming, set design, and dramatic lighting, ultimately challenging the rigid boundaries that have traditionally separated performance art from theater. She was an advisory board member of the New Museum of Contemporary Art in New York.

In 1990, Rosenthal premiered Pangaean Dreams at The Santa Monica Museum Of Art for The L.A. Festival. In 1992, filename: FUTURFAX was commissioned by the Whitney Museum in New York. This work showed the audience a world of rationed food, government hydro-farms with the purpose of raising climate change dialogue and the possibility of human extinction.

In 1994, she was an honoree of the Women's Caucus for Art honor awards selection committee at the annual WCA conference held in New York City.

In 1994 she premiered her 56-performer piece Zone at the UCLA Center for the Performing Arts Wadsworth Theatre. Between 1994 and 1997, with her newly formed Company, she revived the "Instant Theatre" of the 1950s and 1960s as TOHUBOHU! and went on to collaboratively create DBDBDB-d: An Evening (1994), TOHUBOHU! (1995–97), Meditation on the Life and Death of Ken Saro-Wiwa, Timepiece (1996), The Swans and The Unexpurgated Virgin (1997).

Both Timepiece and The Unexpurgated Virgin premiered at the Fall Ahead Festival at Cal State Los Angeles. In 2000, at the FADO Performance Art Centre, Paul Couillard, in collaboration with the 7a*11d International Performance Art Festival, presented Rosenthal's final full-length performance piece, UR-BOOR, for two nights only. In 2000, aged 73, Rosenthal announced that she was retiring from performance to dedicate herself to her animal rights activism and pursue a career as a painter.

She was interviewed for the 2010 film !Women Art Revolution.

Rosenthal lectured at Carnegie-Mellon University's Robert Lepper Distinguished Lecture in Creative Inquiry series, as a lecturer/presenter at the first Performance, Culture and Pedagogy Conference at Penn. State (1996). Rosenthal was also a visiting artist at The Art Institute of Chicago, New York University, University of California Los Angeles, UC Irvine, UC Santa Barbara, California Institute of the Arts, and at the Naropa, Esalen and Omega Institutes. Artist Robert Rauschenberg honored her in a suite of prints entitled Tribute 21.

== Acting roles ==
Rosenthal had a small part in two Season 1 episodes of the television series Frasier, called "The Crucible", and “Call Me Irresponsible” (uncredited). She also had a small part in the Michael Tolkin film, The New Age, which starred Judy Davis.

== Death ==
Rosenthal died on May 10, 2015, in Los Angeles from congestive heart failure. She was 88.

== Awards ==
- Vesta Award from the Woman's Building (1983)
- Obie Award (1989)
- Artcore Art Award (1991)
- College Art Association of America Artist Award (1991)
- Women's Caucus for Art Honor Award for Outstanding Achievement in the Arts (1994)
- The Fresno Art Museum's Distinguished Artist Award (1994)
- Genesis Award (1995)
- Certificate of Commendation and Certificate of Commendation from the City of Los Angeles Cultural Affairs Department (1996)
- LA Weekly Theater Award for Career Achievement (1997)

== Books ==
- Tatti Wattles: A Love Story published by Smart Art Press, Santa Monica, CA;
- Rachel Rosenthal (monograph of her work) published by the Johns Hopkins University Press
- Rachel's Brain and Other Storms, an anthology of 13 of her performance texts published by Continuum and Nihon Journal
- The DbD Experience (Chance Knows What It's Doing) edited by Kate Noonan, published by Routledge
