= Holmes & Yoyo =

- Genre: Situation comedy police comedy
- Created by: Jack Sher; Lee Hewitt
- Starring: Richard B. Shull; John Schuck; Bruce Kirby; Andrea Howard
- Theme music composer: Dick Halligan
- Country of origin: United States
- Original language: English
- No. of seasons: 1
- No. of episodes: 13

Production
- Executive producer: Leonard Stern
- Producer: Arne Sultan
- Running time: 30 minutes
- Production companies: Heyday Productions Inc. Universal Television

Original release
- Network: ABC
- Release: September 25, 1976 – August 8, 1977

Holmes & Yoyo is an American sitcom that aired on ABC for 13 episodes during the 1976–77 season. The series follows police detective Holmes and his new android partner, Yoyo, on their misadventures investigating crimes.

== Premise ==
Detective Alexander Holmes is a down-on-his-luck cop who chronically injures his partners. The department gives him a new partner, Gregory "Yoyo" Yoyonovich, who is clumsy and naive, but good-natured and very strong. During one of their first cases together, Yoyo is shot, and Holmes discovers that his new partner is an android, a sophisticated new crime-fighting machine designed by the police department as their secret weapon. Over the course of the series, Holmes teaches Yoyo how to be more human, while trying to keep his quirky partner's true nature a secret, from both criminals and fellow cops.

== Cast ==
- Richard B. Shull as Detective Alexander Holmes
- John Schuck as his partner Gregory "Yoyo" Yoyonovich.
- Co-stars included Andrea Howard and Bruce Kirby.
- Jay Leno appeared in the pilot as a gas station attendant.

== Production ==
=== Development ===
The executive producer was Leonard Stern, a former staff writer for and executive producer of Get Smart, which featured an android character named Hymie who was largely a prototype for Yoyo. Several episodes of Holmes & Yoyo were directed by John Astin. John Schuck also appeared as SFPD Detective Sgt. Charles Enright in the McMillan & Wife made-for-television films that starred Rock Hudson alongside Susan Saint James, of which Stern was also creator and executive producer.

=== Yoyo's abilities ===
Besides super-strength, Yoyo's other abilities include speed reading, and the ability to analyze clues at the scene. Yoyo had a built-in Polaroid camera: each time his nose was pressed, a Polaroid photograph of his view would be taken and ejected from his shirt pocket. Yoyo's control panel was built into his chest, which could be opened by pulling his tie. The level of Yoyo's batteries was critical, because if they ran down his memory and, effectively, his being would be erased. In one episode his batteries came very close to running down completely, and he was charged by being pushed against an electric fence with his arms extended. Yoyo weighed 427 pounds, and his heavy build could absorb the shock of a bomb.

Much of the show's comedy was derived from Yoyo's constant malfunctions. Some of his common problems included:

- Uncontrollably spinning head over heels when near an electric garage door that was opening or closing.
- Bullets causing him to break out dancing
- Magnets flying at him
- Picking up radio signals from Sweden
- A slew of Polaroid photos spewing from his shirt pocket when a criminal punched him in the nose
- When asked about his previous assignment, he would reply, "The bunco squad," then continue to repeat the phrase no matter what the questioner said, as if he were a skipping record.

Another running gag involved Yoyo's ability to read an entire book by simply fanning its pages; his invariable comment after doing so was, "Thanks for the book! I really enjoyed reading it."

== Episodes ==
No.	Title	Directed by	Written by	Original release date
1	"Pilot"	Jackie Cooper	Jack Sher & Lee Hewitt & Leonard Stern	September 25, 1976
An experienced, but accident-prone, detective is paired with a new partner: a not-quite perfected humanoid robot.
2	"Funny Money"	Leonard Stern	Leonard Stern	October 2, 1976
After Holmes unwittingly tries to pass a counterfeit $20 bill, officials throughout the police department discover their wallets are filled with bogus money.
3	"The Dental Dynamiter"	Leonard Stern	Jack Sher & Lee Hewitt	October 16, 1976
Holmes and Yoyo set out to investigate the bombings of dentists' offices all over town.
4	"The Last Phantom"	Jack Arnold	Earl Barret, Arne Sultan	October 22, 1976
Holmes and Yoyo have a difficult time finding a suspect who is attempting to kill a movie producer.
5	"Yoyo Takes a Bride"	Reza Badiyi	Earl Barret, Arne Sultan	October 23, 1976
Yoyo and Maxine go undercover as a pair of honeymooners at a resort hotel, but the computerized Yoyo isn't programmed to respond romantically and Maxine isn't aware he's a robot.
6	"The Thornhill Affair"	Jack Arnold	Jonathan Kaufer	October 30, 1976
Holmes and Yoyo go undercover to thwart a plot to steal a world-famous gem.
7	"The K-9 Caper"	John Astin	James Ritz	November 13, 1976
Holmes and Yoyo go after a purse snatcher who is described as about 30 inches in height, weighing 80 pounds and covered with brown hair.
8	"The Hostages"	John Astin	Bruce A. Taylor	November 20, 1976
While Holmes and Yoyo are being held hostage, Yoyo realizes that his battery is going dead, his circuits have shorted and his cooling system has broken down.
9	"Key Witness"	Richard Kinon	Earl Barret, Arne Sultan, Len Uhley, John Landis	November 27, 1976
Holmes and Yoyo are sent to protect a frightened informant, but they end up scaring the witness even more than the prospect of a reprisal by the mob.
10	"Dead Duck"	John Astin	Jack Sher, Lee Hewitt	December 4, 1976
Holmes and Yoyo set up to break up an extortion ring by testifying against the leader, but Yoyo can't testify because he's a robot and Holmes is afraid of the Mob.
11	"Connection, Connection II"	John Astin	Leonard Stern	December 11, 1976
One of Holmes' reliable contacts reveals that an important person with City Hall connections is bringing in "stuff" from abroad.
12	"The Cat Burglar"	Reza Badiyi	Richard Freiman, Stephen Young	August 1, 1977
Someone is stealing precious felines for ransom from prosperous ladies, and Holmes and Yoyo set out to catch the catnapper.
13	"Bye, Bye Bennie"	Noam Pitlik	Earl Barret, Arne Sultan, Jonathan Kaufer	August 8, 1977
Holmes and Yoyo are waiting as "Big Bad" Bennie Brown, who is wanted by the Kansas City police, arrives in town.

== Reception ==
The series performed poorly and was cancelled and pulled off air in December 1976, after 11 episodes; the network burned off the remaining two episodes in August 1977. It ranked number 33 on TV Guide's List of the 50 Worst TV Shows of All Time. A few series with similar premises but varying treatment followed, including ABC's Future Cop with Ernest Borgnine and Michael J. Shannon the following year, the 1993 series Mann & Machine, and the 2013 series Almost Human.

== Home media ==
Holmes & Yoyo was released in France on Region 2 DVD in 2016 under the title Holmes et Yoyo - Intégrale de la série. The audio is French only, with no English option.
