= Get Smart, Again! =

1989 television film directed by Gary Nelson

- DVD cover
- Genre: Comedy; Science Fiction
- Based on: Get Smart by Mel Brooks; Buck Henry
- Teleplay by: Leonard Stern; Mark Curtis; Rod Ash
- Story by: Leonard Stern
- Directed by: Gary Nelson
- Starring: Don Adams; Barbara Feldon
- Music by: Peter Rodgers Melnick
- Country of origin: United States
- Original language: English

Production
- Executive producers: Daniel Melnick; Leonard B. Stern
- Producer: Burt Nodella
- Production location: Los Angeles
- Cinematography: Gayne Rescher
- Editor: Donald R. Rode
- Running time: 96 minutes
- Production companies: IndieProd Company Productions; Phoenix Entertainment Group

Original release
- Network: ABC
- Release: February 26, 1989

Related
- The Nude Bomb; Get Smart (1995 TV series)

Get Smart, Again! is a 1989 American made-for-television comedy film based on the 1965–1970 NBC/CBS sitcom Get Smart! starring Don Adams and Barbara Feldon reprising their characters of Maxwell Smart and Agent 99. It originally aired February 26, 1989 on ABC (the network that rejected the original pilot for Get Smart!). After The Nude Bomb (1980), this was the second and final film based on the series that featured Don Adams with most of the original cast.

== Synopsis ==
Maxwell Smart, acting as a protocol officer since CONTROL was disbanded in the early 1970s, is reactivated as a counterintelligence agent by Commander Drury, of the United States Intelligence Agency. KAOS, long considered defunct, has been revitalized by a corporate takeover. Its first scheme involves turning a forgotten American scientist and using his weather control machine to extort US$250 billion from the United States Government.

Drury, convinced that only Smart has the expertise to combat KAOS, gives him carte blanche to reactivate former CONTROL agents to assist him in his task. Along with Drury's bumbling aide, Beamish, Smart recruits Larrabee, who, believing that he was under orders from Richard Nixon to stay at his post until relieved, has been living in his office in the now-abandoned CONTROL headquarters tending his office plants, Agent 13, Hymie the Robot (now employed as a crash test dummy) and ultimately, his wife, 99, to find the security leak that allowed the scientist to defect, locate the weather machine and disarm it. They are opposed by a KAOS mole (John de Lancie) within the USIA, who is able to predict Max's every move with the aid of stolen copies of 99's unpublished memoirs.

The visible head of the KAOS scheme is revealed to be Max's old nemesis, Siegfried, but he is merely the agent of a higher executive whom even he has never met. This new leader is finally revealed as Nicholas Demente (Harold Gould), 99's publisher, who intends not only to extort the money but also to create weather that will keep people eternally indoors and interfere with television reception, forcing millions of Americans to entertain themselves by buying Demente's books and publications. Max, 99, and Beamish infiltrate KAOS with the aide of Siegfried's twin brother Doctor Helmut Schmelding. After defeating Demente's henchmen with medieval weaponry, the CONTROL agents kill Demente with his own weather machine. Max and 99 celebrate by causing it to snow.

== Cast ==
- Don Adams as Maxwell Smart
- Barbara Feldon as Agent 99
- Bernie Kopell as Conrad Siegfried
- Dick Gautier as Hymie
- Robert Karvelas as Larrabee
- King Moody as Shtarker
- Harold Gould as Nicholas Dimente
- Kenneth Mars as Cmdr. Drury
- John de Lancie as Major Waterhouse
- Steve Levitt as Beamish

== Legacy ==
The relative success of the film prompted the development of a short-lived (only seven episodes) 1995 weekly series on Fox, also titled Get Smart, with Don Adams and Barbara Feldon reprising their characters, alongside Andy Dick and Elaine Hendrix in the main roles. It was a ratings failure and was cancelled by Fox halfway through the first season.

The film was dedicated to the memory of Edward Platt (died in 1974), cited in the end credits as Ed Platt, "The Chief".

== Home media ==
The film has been released twice on DVD.

== See also ==
- Get Smart (TV series)
- Get Smart (2008 film)
