= Robert Karvelas =

American actor

- Karvelas in Get Smart
- Born: April 3, 1921; New York City, New York, U.S.
- Died: December 5, 1991 (aged 70); Los Angeles, California, U.S.
- Resting place: Riverside National Cemetery
- Other name: Bob Karvelas
- Occupation: Actor
- Years active: 1965–1989
- Relatives: Don Adams (cousin); Dick Yarmy (cousin)

Robert Karvelas (April 3, 1921 – December 5, 1991) was an American actor. He was best known for his role as Larabee in the television series Get Smart (1965–1970).

== Biography ==
Karvelas was born in New York City with a twin brother and grew up in Charleroi, Pennsylvania. His mother was of Irish descent and his father was of Greek descent. His mother and Don Adams' mother were sisters. Karvelas was a Golden Gloves boxing champion while serving in the United States Marines during World War II and later worked as a stockbroker.

Wanting his cousin to remain close to him, Adams initially gave Karvelas several uncredited bit parts on Get Smart. One such part was an assistant to the Chief, which would evolve into the character of Larabee. Karvelas actually ended up appearing in all five seasons of the show. The character "Larabee" would go on to have the distinction of being just as bumbling as Maxwell Smart, if not more so. In Episode 21, Season 5, Smart tells the Chief, "People ask if Larabee and I are related." Robert's character part, and his generally sweet, unassuming nature, enhanced the joviality of Get Smart.

After the cancellation of Get Smart, Karvelas again joined his cousin Adams on the sitcom, The Partners, which starred Adams and Rupert Crosse and co-starred Dick Van Patten. The show was cancelled after one season. He continued to appear in small bit parts on television before dropping out of acting in 1976. He reprised the character of Larrabee in The Nude Bomb and Get Smart, Again!

Karvelas died in 1991 in Los Angeles and was buried at Riverside National Cemetery in Riverside, California.

== Filmography ==
Year	Title	Role	Notes
1976	Freaky Friday	Diner Customer	Uncredited
1976	Panache	Father Logan	
1976	How To Breakup A Happy Divorce	Father Logan	
1980	The Nude Bomb	Larabee	
1989	Get Smart, Again!	Larabee	(final film role)
