= Boys' Night Out (film) =

1962 film

- Theatrical release poster
- Directed by: Michael Gordon
- Screenplay by: Ira Wallach
- Story by: Arne Sultan; Marvin Worth
- Produced by: Martin Ransohoff
- Starring: Kim Novak; James Garner; Tony Randall
- Cinematography: Arthur E. Arling
- Edited by: Tom McAdoo
- Music by: Frank De Vol
- Production companies: Kimco; Filmways Pictures
- Distributed by: Metro-Goldwyn-Mayer
- Release date: June 21, 1962 (United States)
- Running time: 115 minutes
- Country: United States
- Language: English
- Budget: $1.5 million or $2 million
- Box office: $3.4 million (US/Canada)

Boys' Night Out is a 1962 American romantic comedy film starring Kim Novak, James Garner, and Tony Randall, and featuring Howard Duff, Janet Blair, Howard Morris, Patti Page, Anne Jeffreys, Jessie Royce Landis and Oscar Homolka. The picture was directed by Michael Gordon and was written by Ira Wallach based on a story by Arne Sultan and Marvin Worth.

The film is about three men who are looking to meet needs that are not being satisfied in their marriages. Their bachelor friend arranges for a "kept woman" who is in reality a sociology student studying the fantasies of contemporary American men.

== Plot ==
Three married men, George, Doug, and Howie, and divorcé Fred are friends who commute to work from Greenwich, Connecticut, to New York City on the same train. Seeing Fred's philandering boss, Mr. Bingham, with his mistress sets the men to fantasizing about sharing the expense of an apartment in the city as a love nest. As a gag, they give Fred the task of finding an unrealistically inexpensive apartment and a blonde "companion" to go with it.

Fred rents a luxurious suite from Peter Bowers, who is desperate to find a tenant because the previous occupant was a highly publicized murder victim. By chance, Cathy, a beautiful blonde, also answers the advertisement for the apartment. Fred explains that the place has already been taken, but that he is also looking for a beautiful young "housekeeper" for his friends. To his surprise, she accepts the job. The boys are delighted; each tells his wife that he is taking a course one night a week at The New School for Social Research to improve his mind so he can stay in New York overnight.

Unbeknownst to the men, Cathy is actually a sociology graduate student writing her thesis on the "adolescent fantasies of the adult suburban male." Her skeptical advisor, Dr. Prokosch, objects, saying, "Can you look like 'yes' and act like 'no?' ... This a nice girl hasn't learned." Cathy responds, "No? This is what a nice girl has learned best."

When they start calling on her individually in the evenings, she encourages them to talk, all the while secretly recording their conversations. Cathy deftly avoids being seduced by the married men, although each lets the others think he has slept with her. She supplies what each one really wants: Howie is starved for more substantial food than his dieting wife will provide; Doug likes to repair things that are conveniently broken each week (his status-conscious wife does not want their neighbors to see him tinkering about the house); George enjoys talking about himself, but his spouse keeps finishing his sentences. Fred, however, is a different story: he is very attracted to Cathy and, disgusted by his friends' fabricated stories, refuses to use his night.

In the end, the wives become suspicious, and on the advice of Fred's mother, Ethel, hire private investigator Ernest Bohannon to find out what is going on. Based on his report, they assume the worst and confront their husbands. All three married men confess that nothing happened, and Cathy reveals that she is just doing research.

After getting over the shock, Fred and Cathy become a couple, and the boys' night out is no more; instead, the four couples go out together.

== Cast ==
- Kim Novak as Cathy
- James Garner as Fred Williams
- Tony Randall as George Drayton
- Howard Duff as Doug Jackson
- Janet Blair as Marge Drayton, George's wife
- Patti Page as Joanne McIllenny, Howard's wife
- Jessie Royce Landis as Ethel Williams
- Oskar Homolka as Dr. Prokosch
- Howard Morris as Howard McIllenny
- Anne Jeffreys as Toni Jackson, Doug's wife
- Zsa Zsa Gabor as boss's girl friend
- William Bendix as Slattery, a bartender
- Larry Keating as Mr. Bingham
- Fred Clark as Ernest Bohannon
- Jim Backus as Peter Bowers
- Ruth McDevitt as Beulah Partridge, a busybody
- Billy Halop as Elevator operator

== Production ==
The film was a co-production by Filmways and Kim Novak's production company, Kimco. It was meant to be the first in a three-picture deal between Kimco and Filmways, but it was the only production. It was financed by Joseph E. Levine's Embassy Pictures and was the first film he made in the US. They sold the film to MGM. Novak was paid a reported $500,000.

Director Michael Gordon later said:

That's a picture that really started from a five page dirty joke that the writers sold to the producer. We didn't have censorship ratings at that point; a picture either got the seal of approval or it didn't. I was forced to clarify my ideas about that picture in a way that I think proved constructive. It forced me to recognise that the principal business is to expose certain aspects of human or social folly to ridicule.

Gig Young was offered a part but turned it down. Patti Page, cast in her third movie, later wrote she "was shocked to learn that producer Martin Ransohoff actually wanted me to gain twenty pounds for the role... so I could play a somewhat dowdy Southern wife... Given how much the press had loved to talk about my weight going up and down in the past, I was hardly keen to purposely plump up. But I took the part because it was a great cast and I knew it would be a lot of fun." Page says she still was not "fat enough" for the director and producer so had to dress appropriately.

Garner wrote in his memoirs that Novak "was beautiful and she had a wonderful quality that audiences liked but she didn't know how to act. I think she was insecure because she was always running off the set to fix her face. She was more interested in her makeup than the script." Michael Gordon felt Garner "was so good in both of the films I did with him that it made me feel I was stealing the money I was paid." He thought Novak was "a nice gal," adding "while she wasn't the easiest person to get an effective performance out of, I didn't mind working with her. She tried very hard. She just wasn't the most adept comedienne."

== Reception ==
Boys' Night Out was intended to resurrect Novak's career, which had hit a snag at the age of 29 with the death of Columbia Pictures' production head Harry Cohn, but it was not a financial or critical success.

According to MGM records, the film incurred a loss of $262,000. Although Novak's career did not benefit, it did propel James Garner's forward.

Rotten Tomatoes gave the film a 45% approval based on over 250 reviews as of 2025. Variety called it "only sporadically amusing".

== Home media ==
Boys' Night Out was released to DVD by Warner Home Video on December 22, 2010, via its Warner Archive DVD-on-demand service as a Region 1 DVD.
