= Promise Her Anything =

1965 film by Arthur Hiller

- Theatrical release poster
- Directed by: Arthur Hiller
- Screenplay by: William Peter Blatty
- Story by: Arne Sultan; Marvin Worth
- Produced by: Stanley Rubin
- Starring: Warren Beatty; Leslie Caron; Bob Cummings; Keenan Wynn
- Cinematography: Douglas Slocombe
- Edited by: John Shirley
- Music by: Lyn Murray
- Production company: Seven Arts
- Distributed by: Paramount Pictures
- Release dates: November 1965 (United Kingdom); 22 February 1966 (United States)
- Running time: 98 minutes
- Countries: United Kingdom; United States
- Language: English

Promise Her Anything is a 1965 romantic comedy film directed by Arthur Hiller and starring Warren Beatty and Leslie Caron. The screenplay by William Peter Blatty is based on a story by Arne Sultan and Marvin Worth. The supporting cast features Bob Cummings, Keenan Wynn, Hermione Gingold and Lionel Stander.

== Plot ==
Recently widowed Michele O'Brien moves into a Greenwich Village brownstone with her infant son John Thomas. Her neighbor, Harley Rummel, a bohemian who earns a living by making nudie films in his apartment, becomes interested in her, but Michele believes her boss, wealthy psychologist Philip Brock, is a better prospect as a new mate.

Although he is an authority on children, Philip actually despises them, so Michele decides to keep John Thomas a secret for the time being. Unbeknownst to her, Harley is using the baby in his movies. When John Thomas is admitted to Philip's clinic for observation, Harley sneaks into his room to complete a film, but his surreptitious activities are captured by a hidden camera recording the baby's behavior. Michelle is furious but, when he saves John Thomas from a potentially dangerous situation, she forgives Harley and decides he may be the better choice for a father after all.

== Cast ==
- Warren Beatty as Harley Rummell
- Leslie Caron as Michele O'Brien
- Bob Cummings as Dr. Philip Brock
- Keenan Wynn as Angelo Carelli
- Hermione Gingold as Mrs. Luce
- Lionel Stander as Sam
- Asa Maynor as Rusty
- Cathleen Nesbitt as Mrs. Brock
- Michael Bradley and Philip Barron as John Thomas
- Warren Mitchell as Frank Focus / panel moderator
- Sydney Tafler as panel participant
- Michael Kane as staff doctor
- Riggs O'Hara as glue sniffer
- Mavis Villiers as Rusty's mother
- Margaret Nolan as mail-order film girl
- Viviane Ventura as mail-order film girl
- George Moon
- Charlotte Holland as neighbours
- Ferdy Mayne as Vittorio Fettucini
- Libby Morris as clinic mother
- Bessie Love as pet shop customer
- Jill Adams as Mrs. B.M. von Crispin

Uncredited (in order of appearance)

- Kathleen Hughes as mother in Dr. Brock's audience
- Jo Anne Worley as mother asking Dr. Brock for advice
- Donald Sutherland as father asking Dr. Brock to autograph books
- Anita Sharp-Bolster as Mrs. Egan, babysitter
- Michael Chaplin as Heathcliff, beatnik

== Production ==
The film was entirely shot at Shepperton Studios in Surrey, England. The original Baby John Thomas was supposed to be played by 2-year-old Philip Barron, but he didn't get on with Warren Beatty and cried almost every time he went near him, so there was a last-minute change and a Michael Bradley was found so production could start, and both children were used during filming. Bad weather delayed filming, and seven minutes were cut from the final edit.

The title song, with music by Burt Bacharach and lyrics by Hal David, was performed on the soundtrack by Tom Jones.

== Novelization ==
In February 1966, Dell Publishing released a paperback novelization by Al Hine under his frequent tie-in pseudonym, "Bradford Street." There is no attribution to the screenplay, though the 1965 copyright is assigned to Paramount Pictures. The cover price was 45¢ and the cover photos feature stars Beatty and Caron.

== Critical reception ==
Variety called the film "light" and "refreshing" and added, "Well-paced direction of many fine performances, generally sharp scripting and other good production elements add up to a satisfying comedy."

Time Out New York said, "This dull attempt at an offbeat and sophisticated romantic comedy falls flat on its face, thanks largely to the usual sluggish direction from Arthur Hiller [and] ... a dismal script by William Peter Blatty."
