= Shoe phone =

Fictional shoes with built-in telephone

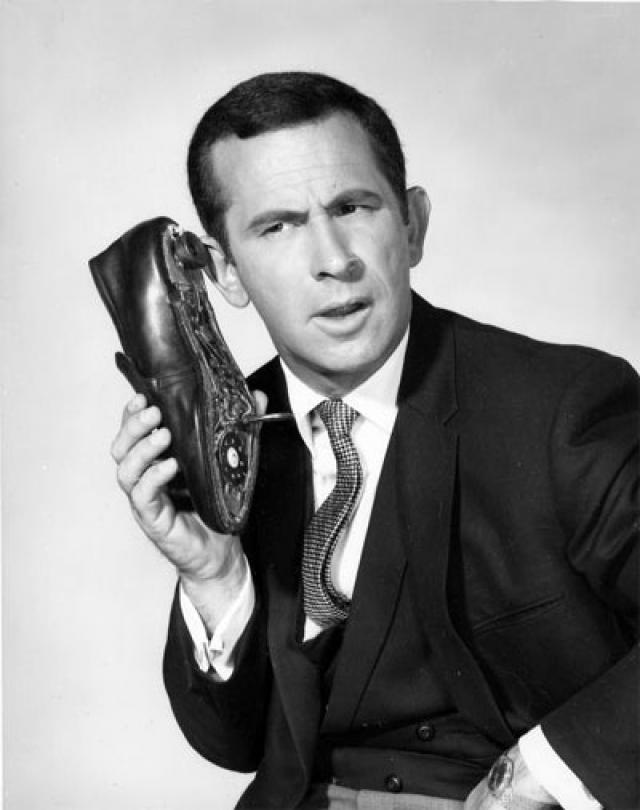
Get Smart character Maxwell Smart (Don Adams) using his signature shoe phone

A shoe phone is a shoe that has a telephone within it. The concept was popularized by the 1960s television series Get Smart, which used the shoe phone as a parody of the spy gadgets portrayed in the James Bond films, but there is no evidence that shoe phones have ever actually been used in espionage. Modern mobile phone technology has allowed for the development and production of working shoe phones.

== Get Smart ==
On Get Smart, the use of a shoe phone is a gimmick of the show's main character, Maxwell Smart (played by Don Adams), a secret agent who has need to conceal a communication device. Removing the shoe's sole exposed a telephone handset and dial.

A shoe phone of the sort depicted by Get Smart would almost certainly not have been possible at the time of the show (1965–1970). Like many gadgets depicted in the series, the shoe phone was a parody of communication gadgets in James Bond films, which were themselves often fantastical.

When the Central Intelligence Agency announced that one of Don Adams' prop shoe phones would be placed on display at the CIA Museum, the agency dismissed any link to actual spy equipment and said shoe phones and other such gadgets were "but fantasy precursors to today’s wireless communications".

== Sneaker phone ==
Sports Illustrated's Sneaker Phone

In the 1990s, Sports Illustrated developed and promoted a "Sneaker Phone", a sports shoe that included a (corded) phone. The company began a television campaign to promote a special deal whereby consumers who subscribed to their magazine received a free Sneaker Phone. The product was created for Sports Illustrated by Kinetic Marketing Inc., a firm known for creating promotional products for large magazines throughout the 1980s and 1990s.
