= Andrea Howard =

American actress (born 1947)

- Howard in Wild About Harry (1978)
- Born: February 10, 1947 (age 79); Salt Lake City, Utah, U.S.
- Occupations: Actress, interior designer, realtor
- Years active: 1972–1992 (as actress)
- Spouse: Volney E. Howard (m. 1974; died 2016)
- Children: 3

Andrea Howard (born February 10, 1947) is an American businesswoman and retired actress who worked in film and television in the 1970s and 1980s.

Howard's more notable films include The Nude Bomb as Agent 22 (1980), and Thank God It's Friday as Sue (1978). Some of her notable television credits include the American daytime soap opera Santa Barbara as Veronica Gayley (1984–85) and the comedy series Holmes & Yoyo as Maxine Moon (1976–77).

Howard married her first husband at the age of eighteen and had two children from the marriage, but she was divorced by the age of twenty-five. Her first job in the film business was as a production assistant at Universal Studios. Shortly after that, she made the change to acting.

Howard retired from acting in the early 1990s after a 20-year career. She then went into the real estate business with her second husband and also studied interior design. In later years, she has owned a winery in Bennett Valley with her husband and a bed and bath boutique store with her daughter. She currently lives in Hilton Head Island, South Carolina, where she has worked as a realtor.

== Filmography ==
=== Television ===
Year	Program	Role	Title	Episodes
1974	The Snoop Sisters	Secretary to Arwin Shanks	Blue Day For Blackbeard	1
1975; 1976	McMillan & Wife	Kathi; Joanne Nelson	Love, Honor and Swindle; Point Of Law	2
1976	Ellery Queen	Studio Receptionist	The Adventure of the Hard Hearted Huckster	1
1976	Holmes & Yoyo	Maxine Moon		1
1977	Lanigan's Rabbi		Corpse Of The Year	1
1977	Rosetti and Ryan	Sister Contanza	Men Who Loved Women	1
1978	Eight is Enough		Milk and Sympathy	1
1979	A Man Called Sloane	Anna	Sweethearts of Disaster	1
1980	B. J. and the Bear	Noreen	The Friendly Double Cross	1
1982	Strike Force	Marian	Humiliation	1
1982	Herbie, the Love Bug	Diane Darcy	My House is Your House	1
1982	The Devlin Connection	Carla		1
1983	Policewoman Centerfold	Margo Syms		TV movie
1983	Making of a Male Model	Marsha		TV movie
1983	Automan	Laura Robinson	The Great Pretender	1
1983	The Love Boat	Lily Fenley	So Help Me Hannah/The Maid Cleans Up/C.P.R, I.O.U.	1
1984/1985	Santa Barbara	Veronica Gayley		40
1986	Knight Rider	Bronwyn Appelby	Killer K.I.T.T	1
1986	Dynasty	Sales Lady	The Triple Cross	1

=== Film ===
Year	Title	Role	Notes
1978	Thank God It's Friday	Sue	
1979	Just You and Me, Kid	Sue	
1980	The Nude Bomb	Agent 22	
1982	Pink Motel	Traci	
1987	Summer School	Woman at Strip Joint	(final film role)
