= Mario Fratti =

Italian playwright (1927–2023)

- Born: 29 July 1927; L'Aquila, Abruzzo, Italy
- Died: 15 April 2023 (aged 95); New York City, New York, U.S.
- Occupation: Playwright
- Years active: 1959–2023

Mario Fratti (29 July 1927 – 15 April 2023) was an Italian playwright and drama critic. In his lifetime, he produced over 70 works, which were translated into over 20 languages and shown worldwide. He was best known for writing the first script for the musical Nine.

== Life and career ==
Born in L'Aquila, Fratti graduated in foreign languages and literatures at the Ca' Foscari University of Venice. In 1962, Fratti presented his one-act play Suicidio at the Festival dei Due Mondi in Spoleto, and Lee Strasberg, a guest of the festival, was impressed by it and invited him to stage it at the Actors Studio. Fratti eventually decided to stay in New York, where he found work as a professor of Italian literature at Columbia University. In his later life, he was named as professor emeritus of Italian Literature at Hunter College.

Fratti was an avowed communist. He died in his home in Manhattan on 15 April 2023, at the age of 95.

== Mario Fratti Award ==
Since 2014, the theater company KIT - Kairos Italy Theater together with the Casa Italiana Zerilli-Marimo' of NYU and In Scena Theatre Festival have created the Mario Fratti Award in his honour. The prize is awarded to an unpublished theatrical text by an Italian author. Among the winners are Carlotta Corradi, Pier Lorenzo Pisano, Emanuele Aldrovandi, Paolo Bignami, the couple Chiara Boscaro and Marco Di Stefano, Tobia Rossi, Giorgia Brusco, Luca Garello and Andrea Cioffi. After Mario Fratti's death, the award was renamed In Scena! Playwright Award

== Plays ==
- Il campanello (1958)
- Suicidio (1962)
- La menzogna (1963)
- Il rifiuto (1965)
- La gabbia (1962)
- L'Accademia (1964)
- La vedova bianca (1972)
- I Seduttori (1964)
- I frigoriferi (1964)
- Eleonora Duse (1972)
- La vittima (1972)
- Che Guevara (1970)
- L'ospite romano (1971)
- Mafia (1974)
- La famiglia (1972)
- Chile 1973 (1974)
- Six Passionate Women (1978)
- Nine (1981)
- AIDS (1988)
- Porno (199)
- Amanti (1991)
- Avventure erotiche a Venezia (Tangentopoli) (1996)
- Candida e i suoi amici (2001)
- Cecità (2004)
- I nove martiri (2009)
- LGBT (2011)
- Obama 44 (2011)
- Beata, la figlia del Papa
- Attori
- Terrorista
- Sete
- Anniversario
- Missionari
- Garibaldi
- American Dream
- Suicide club
- Dead Men's Bluff
- Brooklyn
- Hugo, ispirata a Hugo Chávez
- Paganini (Musical)
- Puccini (Musical)
- Dialogo con Marilyn
- Teatro dell'Imprevedibile
- Unpredictable Plays
