= Burt Nodella =

American television producer

Burton "Burt" Nodella (May 26, 1924 – February 23, 2016), also known as Cary Nodella, was an American television producer, most notably for the cult classic Get Smart.

== World War II ==
The Brooklyn native served in the United States Army in World War II under General George S. Patton Jr., survived conflicts at Omaha Beach and the Battle of the Bulge, and helped liberate the Bergen-Belsen concentration camp.

== Career ==
Nodella produced 47 episodes during seasons three and four of the 1960s comedy series Get Smart, wrote a couple of installments and appeared as a KAOS doctor in another. He won two Emmy Awards in 1968 and 1969 for producing the series. He also contributed to The Tim Conway Show (1970) and CBS Summer Playhouse, as well as various television movies.

== Personal life ==
In 1946, Nodella attended University of California, Los Angeles where he met Joanne Davis. They married in 1947 and had two children. From 1968 to 1979, Nodella dated model and actress Barbara Feldon, who played "Agent 99" on Get Smart. He spent his remaining years living on his boat in Marina del Rey.

== Death ==
Burt Nodella died on February 23, 2016, aged 91, and was survived by his two children, Matthew Nodella and Carrie Kane.
