= Arne Sultan =

American producer and screenwriter

- Born: Arnold Sultan; June 7, 1925; New York, U.S.
- Died: March 17, 1986 (aged 60); Studio City, California, U.S.
- Occupations: Producer, screenwriter

Arnold Sultan (June 7, 1925 – March 17, 1986) was an American producer and screenwriter. He was the partner of Marvin Worth.

Sultan has worked as a producer/writer on television programs. His credits includes, Get Smart, Too Close for Comfort, Barney Miller, The Governor & J.J., Holmes & Yoyo, Check It Out! and The Partners. He has worked on films such as See No Evil, Hear No Evil, Three on a Couch, The Nude Bomb, Promise Her Anything, Boys' Night Out. Sultan was nominated for two Primetime Emmy Awards from 1968 to 1976.

Sultan died in March 1986 of cancer at his home in Studio City, California, at the age of 60.
