= Martinez News-Gazette =

Newspaper published in Martinez, California

- Type: Weekly newspaper
- Owner(s): Gibson Radio and Publishing Co.
- Founder: W.B. Soule
- Editor: Rick Jones
- Founded: 1858
- Ceased publication: 2019
- Language: English
- Website: martinezgazette.com

The Martinez News-Gazette was a newspaper published in Martinez, California, from 1858 to 2019. It was published for 161 years and was the oldest newspaper in Contra Costa County at the time of its closure.

== History ==
On September 18, 1858, W.B. Soule first published the Contra Costa Gazette in Martinez, California. That November, Charles Bonnard and B.G. Hillman purchased the paper, followed in March 1859 by W. Bradford. On April 28, 1860, Bradford sold a half-interest to R.R. Bunker. In March 1861, W.W. Theobalds bought out Bradford. In September 1861, the paper was relocated to Pacheco, California, due to it being a more centralized location. In July, 1865, Charles B. Porter bought out Theobalds.

The 1868 Hayward earthquake damaged the paper's printing plant, which in 1871 was destroyed by a fire. At that time the paper moved back to Martinez. In March 1882, Fred L. Foster became a co-owner. In November 1883, Porter exited the firm. In August 1887, Thomas S. Davenport succeeded F.L. Foster. In October 1888, James Foster succeeded Davenport, and died in December 1891. His interests were bequeathed to his granddaughter, Miss Edna A. Needles, who in June 1893 sold it to Wallace Clarence Brown. In December 1895, after 35-years of ownership, Bunker sold his stake to Brown.

The Gazette was acquired from Brown by G.E. Milnes in November 1897, who in turn sold it in November 1907 to W.A. Rugg. A rival paper called the Martinez Daily Standard was established in May 1911 by Will R. Sharkey and John F. Galvin. In April 1912, Galvin left the Standard after buying the Richmond Independent. In January 1930, R.G. Graves bought the Gazette from Rugg. In April 1930, Galvin bought the Gazette and in November 1930 sold it to Sharkey, who merged it with the Standard. In July 1948, Sharkey died. His estate went to his widow Mrs. Nannie Elizabeth Sharkey and the paper was edited by his son, Will R. Sharkey Jr.

In October 1963, Luther E. Gibson, owner of the morning Vallejo Times Herald and evening Vallejo News-Chronicle, purchased the Contra Costa Gazette, and renamed it to the Martinez News-Gazette. In July 1988, Gibson died. His company, Gibson Radio and Publishing Co. continued to operate the paper. In November 2019, the News-Gazette ceased. However, Rick Jones, the paper's editor, relaunched the News-Gazette without the company's permission but it ceased again after two months in April 2020 due to the COVID-19 pandemic in the United States. Articles continue to be published to the paper's website as of 2024.
