= Barbara Feldon =

American actress (born 1933)

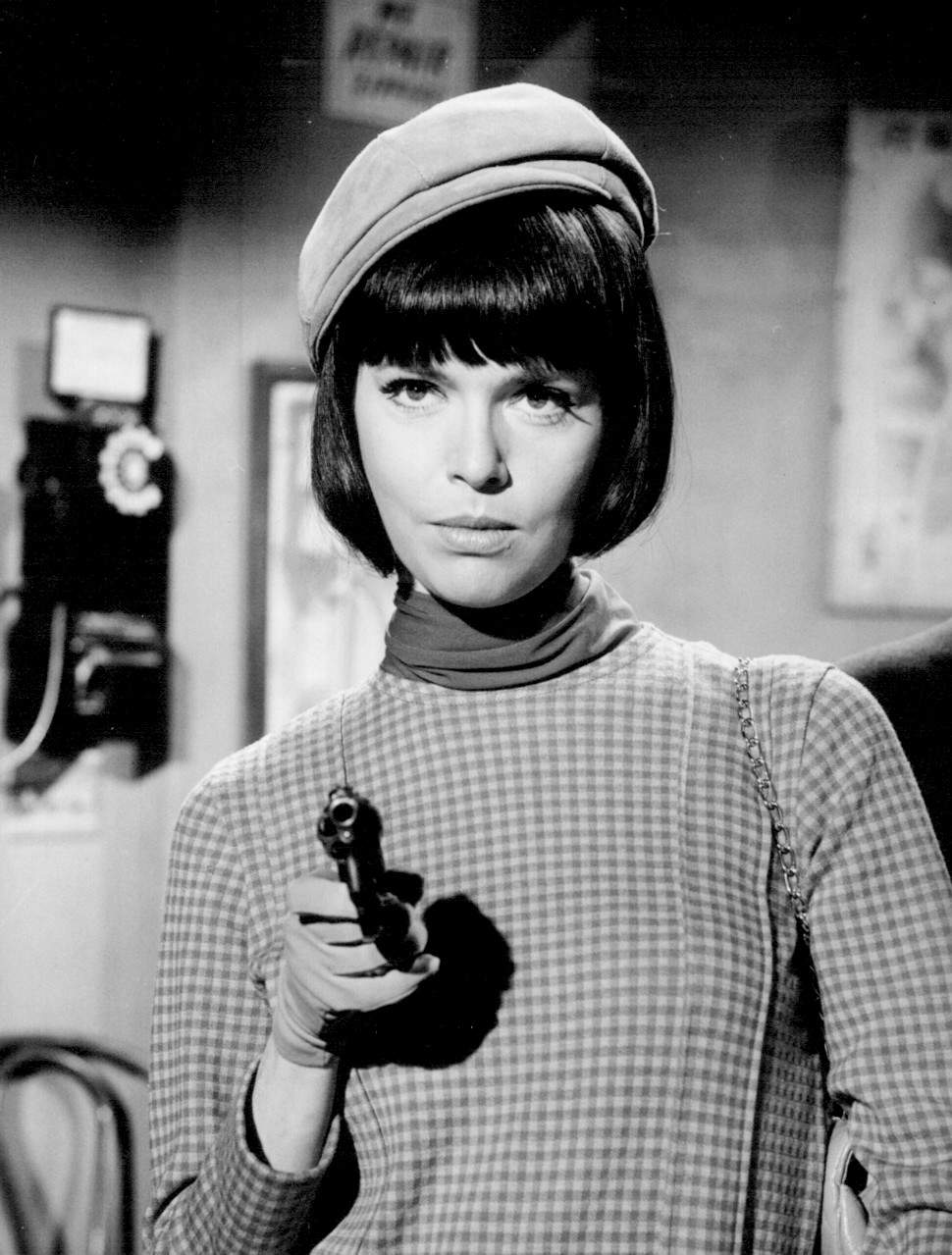
- Feldon as Agent 99 in the sitcom Get Smart in 1965
- Born: Barbara Anne Hall; March 12, 1933 (age 93); Butler, Pennsylvania, U.S.
- Education: Carnegie Mellon University (BFA)
- Occupation: Actress
- Years active: 1957–2006
- Known for: Get Smart
- Spouse: Lucien Verdoux-Feldon (m. 1958; div. 1967)
- Partner(s): Burt Nodella (1968–1979)

Barbara Feldon (born Barbara Anne Hall; March 12, 1933) is an American retired actress primarily known for her roles on television. Her most prominent role was that of Agent 99 in the 1965–1970 sitcom Get Smart which earned her two Primetime Emmy Award nominations for Outstanding Lead Actress in a Comedy Series.

== Early life ==
Feldon was born Barbara Anne Hall in Butler, Pennsylvania, part of the Pittsburgh metropolitan area. Feldon and her older sister Patricia were the daughters of Raymond Dorsey Hall and Juliet Harriet (née Stewart). She graduated from Bethel Park High School and trained at Pittsburgh Playhouse. In 1955, she graduated from Carnegie Institute of Technology with a Bachelor of Arts in drama. She was initiated into the Delta Xi chapter of Kappa Kappa Gamma. In 1957, she won the grand prize on The $64,000 Question in the category of William Shakespeare.

== Career ==
Feldon studied acting at HB Studio. Following working as a model, Feldon's break came in the form of a popular and much-parodied television commercial for "Top Brass," a hair pomade for men by Revlon. Lounging languidly on an animal-print rug, she purred at the camera, addressing the male viewers who use it as "tigers."

This led to small roles in television series. In the 1960s, she made appearances on Twelve O'Clock High (season one episode "End of the Line"), Flipper (season one two-parter episode "The Lady and the Dolphin") and The Man from U.N.C.L.E. (in "The Never-Never Affair", which aired spring 1965). In 1964, she appeared with Simon Oakland in the episode "Try to Find a Spy" of CBS's short-lived drama Mr. Broadway.

One substantial guest-starring role was opposite George C. Scott in the television drama East Side/West Side (season one). It was produced by Talent Associates which was also developing a TV comedy called Get Smart with two prominent writers, Mel Brooks and Buck Henry.

Feldon was cast in this new show as "Agent 99". She starred opposite comedian Don Adams, who portrayed Maxwell Smart, "Secret Agent 86". She played the role for the duration of the show's production from 1965 until 1970 and was nominated for an Emmy Award for Outstanding Lead Actress in a Comedy Series in 1968 and 1969.

The character was unusual for the era, showing a capable woman succeeding in a stressful career. Feldon noted, "A lot of women said 99 was a role model for them because she was smart and always got the right answer." Feldon almost lost her role as 99 because the sponsor of Get Smart was a deodorant soap, and she had done a deodorant commercial for Revlon. Feldon was also noticeably taller than Adams, her male co-star, another rarity for the time.

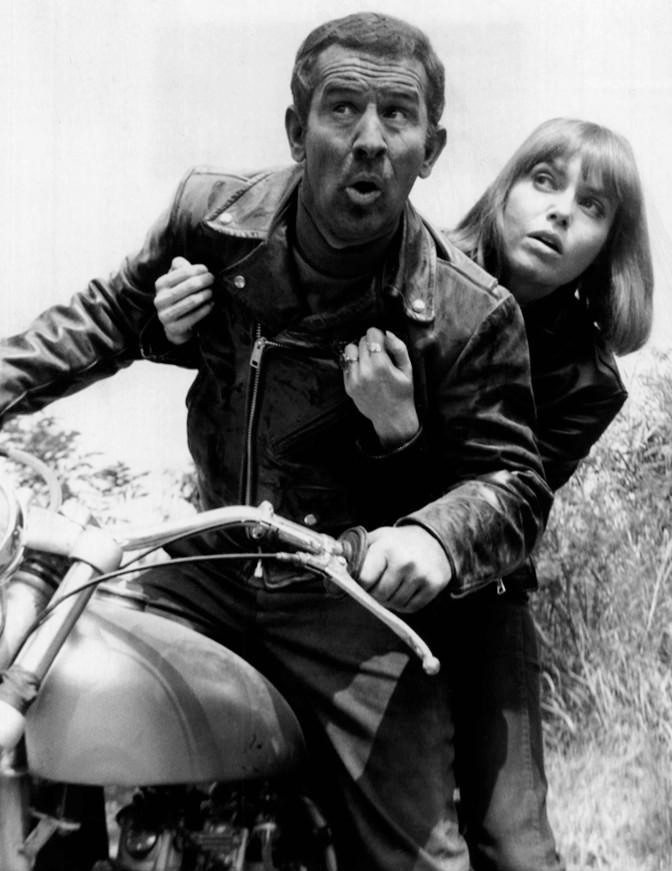
Feldon and Don Adams in Get Smart, 1967

Feldon made guest appearances five times on The Dean Martin Show from 1968 to 1972, singing and dancing and performing in comedy skits. She also appeared on Rowan & Martin's Laugh-In. After her starring TV role, she guest-starred in several 1970s television series, including The Carol Burnett Show (season 3, episode 17 (1970)), Thriller (season 1, episode 1 (1973)), The Name of the Game, McMillan & Wife and Lorne Greene's Griff.

Her TV movies include Getting Away from It All (1972) with Larry Hagman, Let's Switch! (1975) with Barbara Eden, Before and After (1979) with Patty Duke, and the cult-classic thriller A Vacation in Hell (1979) with Maureen McCormick and Priscilla Barnes. She voiced the character Patti Bear in the 1973 animated television special The Bear Who Slept Through Christmas.

Feldon's feature films included supporting roles in Fitzwilly (1967), Smile (1975), and No Deposit, No Return (1976). Her last film to date is 2006's Last Request, a comedy with T. R. Knight, Danny Aiello, and Joe Piscopo.

In 1978 she was Bob Eubanks's first co-host of the annual January 1 Tournament of Roses Parade in Pasadena. In 1982, Feldon appeared at Denver's Elitch Theatre in What I Did Last Summer.

Feldon reprised her role as "Agent 99" in the made-for-television film Get Smart, Again! (1989) and in a short-lived revival of Get Smart in 1995. She wrote and provided audio commentaries and introductions for the DVD release of the original Get Smart series in 2006, but did not take part in the 2008 film adaptation that starred Steve Carell as Maxwell Smart. Feldon guest-starred as a former TV spy star on a 1993 season one episode of Mad About You as Diane "Spy Girl" Caldwell.

Feldon played Lauren Hudson, Sam Malone's annual Valentine's Day love interest, in the 1991 Cheers episode "Sam Time Next Year".

Feldon's distinctive voice has been heard in numerous TV and radio commercials and film and TV documentaries. She has occasionally acted in off-Broadway plays but said she is "no longer interested in performing".

Feldon is an accomplished writer and is still actively writing. In 2015, she had two editorial pieces featured in Metropolitan Magazine. She wrote two books, Living Alone and Loving It, in 2003, and Getting Smarter: A Memoir in 2021.

== Personal life ==
Feldon has been the actress's last name since she married Lucien Verdoux-Feldon in 1958. They divorced in 1967 due to Lucien's growing drug addiction. In 1968, while living in Los Angeles, she began a 12-year relationship with Get Smart producer Burt Nodella. Upon ending her relationship, she moved back to New York City, and was still living there as of 2024.

== Awards and nominations ==
Awards
Year	Award	Category	Production	Result
1968	Emmy Awards	Outstanding Continued Performance by an Actress in a Leading Role in a Comedy Series	Get Smart	Nominated
1969	Emmy Awards	Outstanding Continued Performance by an Actress in a Leading Role in a Comedy Series	Get Smart	Nominated

== Works ==
- Feldon, Barbara (2003). Living Alone and Loving It. New York: Simon & Schuster. ISBN 978-0-7432-3517-4. OCLC 50091772.
- Feldon, Barbara (2021). Getting Smarter: A Memoir. New York: Stewart-Hall Books. ISBN 978-1737665311.
