= Get Smart (1995 TV series) =

American sitcom

- Also known as: Get Smart '95
- Genre: Sitcom
- Created by: Michael J. DiGaetano; Lawrence Gay
- Based on: Get Smart by Mel Brooks; Buck Henry
- Starring: Don Adams; Andy Dick; Elaine Hendrix; Barbara Feldon; Heather Morgan
- Composer: James Covell
- Country of origin: United States
- Original language: English
- No. of seasons: 1
- No. of episodes: 7

Production
- Executive producers: Vic Kaplan; Lawrence Gay; Michael J. DiGaetano
- Producers: Nick Marck; Leo J. Clarke
- Cinematography: John Fleckenstein
- Editor: John Murray
- Running time: 30 minutes (including commercials)
- Production companies: HBO Independent Productions; Columbia Pictures Television

Original release
- Network: Fox
- Release: January 8 – February 19, 1995

Related
- Get Smart, Again!

Get Smart is an American sitcom sequel to the original 1965–1970 NBC/CBS sitcom Get Smart starring Don Adams and Barbara Feldon reprising their characters of Maxwell Smart and Agent 99. The series aired Sunday at 7:30 pm on Fox for seven episodes from January 8 to February 19, 1995.

== Overview ==
Maxwell Smart is the Chief of CONTROL, and Agent 99 is a politician. Their bungling son, Zach (Andy Dick), one of the twins introduced in the fifth season of the original show, becomes CONTROL's star agent. Zach is teamed with the reluctant Agent 66 (Elaine Hendrix) as they try to stop KAOS from controlling the world's economy. Joining Zach and 66 is Trudy (Heather Morgan), an accident prone spy, and Agent 0, a master of disguise.

== Characters ==
=== Main ===
- Maxwell Smart (Don Adams) – Chief of spy organization CONTROL
- Zachary "Zach" Smart (Andy Dick) – Max's son and the star agent of CONTROL
- Agent 66 (Elaine Hendrix) – Zach's partner
- Agent 99 (Barbara Feldon) – D.C. Congresswoman
- Trudy (Heather Morgan) – CONTROL's dimwitted secretary

=== Recurring ===
- The KAOS Chairwoman (Marcia Mitzman Gaven)
- Agent 9 (Gabrielle Boni)

== Episodes ==
| No. | Title | Directed by | Written by | Original release date |
|---|---|---|---|---|
| 1 | "Pilot" | Nick Marck | Michael J. DiGaetano & Lawrence Gay | January 8, 1995 |
Things have certainly changed around CONTROL over the years. Maxwell Smart has become the Chief; 99 has become a Congresswoman; and their son, Zach, has become an agent very much like Max — intellectually lacking, yet always successful. Now, Zach is assigned a new partner in Agent 66 and a new mission. The Du-Traculon fabric is targeted for theft by the still operational KAOS. With a fashion show as the backdrop, some undercover work gives Zach and 66 their only chance to stop agent Larz.
| 2 | "Casino Evil" | Nick Marck | Gary Apple & Michael Carrington | January 15, 1995 |
Under the supervision of a Mr. Monte, a new and popular casino is in business. Problem is, the whole thing is a KAOS front. While many people chalk up their big losses to bad luck, they have actually been secretly cheated. Taking this operation down falls to the undercover Zach and Agent 66. However, can they win when the house is always poised to do so?
| 3 | "Goodbye Ms. Chip" | Nick Marck | Lawrence Gay & Michael J. DiGaetano | January 22, 1995 |
African President Mazabuka is due to arrive in America for a diplomatic occasion involving Congresswoman 99. Meanwhile, CONTROL is on the trail of The Brain, a KAOS agent and a master of mind control. He proves his capabilities by getting the drop on 66 and installing one of his brain implants in her. Now, KAOS has the assassin for their plot against Mazabuka. If Zach and others fail to notice 66's increasingly odd behavior, she will succeed. The title is a pun of Goodbye Mr. Chips.
| 4 | "Shoot Up the Charts" | Nick Marck | Gary Apple & Michael Carrington | January 29, 1995 |
When KAOS Incorporated murders the only recording artist on their label, Agent 66 and Zach audition as a band called 'Galaxy' with Zach pretending to be Randy Starr, her agent and pianist, in an attempt to stop KAOS brainwashing people with a song encrypted with hypnotic messages.
| 5 | "Passenger 99" | Nick Marck | Lawrence Gay & Michael J. DiGaetano | February 5, 1995 |
Agent 99 attends a plane flight with the foreign minister back to his country to finish their agreement on mineral rights, however an assassin called 'The Turtle' has been called into service by KAOS to kill him on the flight. Zach and 66 discover the murder plot and proceed on the case by acting as flight attendants to protect the minister and 99.
| 6 | "Wurst Enemies" | Nick Marck | Craig Hoffman | February 12, 1995 |
Zach has recently begun dating Jessica and things seem pretty good between them. However, a rendezvous at a lighthouse suddenly turns sour when she imprisons him. She has done this on the order of her father, Siegfried. He is still evil and has huge plans, including settling the score with his arch-foe, Maxwell Smart. Blackmailed with his son's life, Max must confront Siegfried again and alone. As it happens, Max must not only save Zach, but also America's most brilliant minds from a missile. A cliffhanger ending has Siegfried just leaving the lighthouse room when Max accidentally activates the missile; the teaser shows the missile blowing up the lighthouse.
| 7 | "Liver Let Die" | Nick Marck | Michael J. DiGaetano & Lawrence Gay | February 19, 1995 |
Zach and Agent 66 go undercover as doctors to investigate why KAOS has been funding hospitals. They discover the KAOS medical staff are harvesting organs from the living to then sell them to rich individuals as part of the KAOS operation 'Robin Hood'. However, before the duo can escape to headquarters and expose the truth, the staff find out they are CONTROL agents and try to harvest them next. The title is a spoof of the name Live and Let Die

== Production ==
=== Conception ===
The relative success of the 1989 reunion movie Get Smart, Again! eventually prompted the development of a weekly revival of Get Smart, with Don Adams and Barbara Feldon reprising their characters Maxwell Smart and Agent 99 respectively, with Dave Ketchum also reprising his role of Agent 13 and Bernie Kopell reprising his role as Siegfried. Though Zachary Smart's name was revealed in the FOX revival, his twin sister's name remained unrevealed.

=== Legacy ===
With the revival series on Fox, Get Smart became the first television franchise to air new episodes on each of the four then-current major American television broadcasting networks. The first four seasons of the original Get Smart series aired on NBC, while the fifth and final season aired on CBS. Get Smart, Again! aired on ABC.

=== Ending ===
The show failed to recapture the spirit of the original, and low ratings with an average of 5 million viewers per episode ranked the series 133rd for 1995. There were no high hopes for the series as Andy Dick had already moved on to NewsRadio, which premiered weeks later in 1995 on NBC. Feldon reflected upon the show and its failure as one where it became apparent as soon as she walked on the set that it was something that was "taken out of its time".

== Home media ==
The complete series was released on DVD on June 3, 2008, by Sony Pictures Home Entertainment in anticipation of the release of the 2008 film Get Smart starring Steve Carell.
