= Get Smart =

American comedy television series (1965–1970)

- The title card from seasons one and two
- Genre: Satire; Sitcom; Action adventure
- Created by: Mel Brooks; Buck Henry
- Directed by: Gary Nelson; Bruce Bilson; Don Adams; James Komack; Earl Bellamy
- Starring: Don Adams; Barbara Feldon; Edward Platt
- Theme music composer: Irving Szathmary
- Country of origin: United States
- No. of seasons: 5
- No. of episodes: 138 (list of episodes)

Production
- Executive producers: Leonard B. Stern; Arne Sultan
- Producers: Jay Sandrich; Arnie Rosen; Jess Oppenheimer; Burt Nodella; Chris Hayward
- Camera setup: single-camera
- Running time: 22–25 minutes
- Production companies: Talent Associates; CBS Productions

Original release
- Network: NBC
- Release: September 18, 1965 – March 29, 1969
- Network: CBS
- Release: September 26, 1969 – May 15, 1970

Related
- The Nude Bomb (film)

Get Smart is an American comedy television series parodying the secret agent genre that had become widely popular in the first half of the 1960s with the release of the James Bond films. It was created by Mel Brooks and Buck Henry, and had its television premiere on NBC on September 18, 1965. It starred Don Adams, who was also a director on the series, as agent Maxwell Smart (Agent 86), Barbara Feldon as Agent 99, and Edward Platt as The Chief. Henry said that they created the show at the request of Daniel Melnick to capitalize on James Bond and Inspector Clouseau, "the two biggest things in the entertainment world today". Brooks described it as "an insane combination of James Bond and Mel Brooks comedy".

The show generated a number of popular catchphrases during its run, including "Sorry about that, Chief", "...and loving it", "missed it by that much", and "would you believe...". The show was followed by the films The Nude Bomb, a 1980 theatrical film made without the involvement of Brooks and Henry, and Get Smart, Again!, a 1989 made-for-TV sequel to the series, and a 1995 revival series and a 2008 film adaptation. In 2010, TV Guide ranked Get Smart's opening title sequence at number two on its list of TV's top 10 credits sequences as selected by readers. The show switched networks in 1969 to CBS. It ended its five-season run on May 15, 1970, after 138 episodes.

The Museum of Broadcast Communications found the show notable for "broadening the parameters for the presentation of comedy on television".

== Premise ==
The series centers on bumbling secret agent Maxwell Smart (Adams), also known as Agent 86, and his unnamed female partner, Agent 99 (Feldon). They work for CONTROL, a secret US government counterintelligence agency based in Washington, D.C., fighting against KAOS, "the international organization of evil". While Smart always succeeds in thwarting KAOS, his incompetent nature and insistence on doing things "by the book" invariably cause complications.

The enemies, world-takeover plots, and gadgets seen in Get Smart were a parody of the James Bond film franchise. "Do what they did except just stretch it half an inch", Mel Brooks said of the methods of this TV series.

== Production ==
Talent Associates commissioned Mel Brooks and Buck Henry to write a script about a bungling James Bond–like hero. Brooks described the premise for the show that they created in an October 1965 Time magazine article:

I was sick of looking at all those nice, sensible situation comedies. They were such distortions of life. If a maid ever took over my house like Hazel, I'd set her hair on fire. I wanted to do a crazy, unreal, comic-strip kind of thing about something besides a family. No one had ever done a show about an idiot before. I decided to be the first.

Brooks and Henry proposed the show to ABC, where network executives called it "un-American" and demanded a "lovable dog to give the show more heart", as well as scenes showing Maxwell Smart's mother. Brooks strongly objected to the second suggestion:

They wanted to put a print housecoat on the show. Max was to come home to his mother and explain everything. I hate mothers on shows. Max has no mother. He never had one.

The cast and crew contributed joke and gadget ideas, especially Don Adams, but dialogue was rarely ad-libbed. An exception is the third-season episode "The Little Black Book". Don Rickles encouraged Adams to misbehave, and he ad-libbed. The result was so successful that the single episode was turned into two parts.

The first four seasons on NBC were filmed at Sunset Bronson Studios, while the final season, shown on CBS, was filmed at CBS Studio Center.

=== Production personnel ===
Brooks had little involvement with the series after the first season, but Henry served as story editor through 1967. The crew of the show included:

- Leonard B. Stern – executive producer for the entire run of the series
- Irving Szathmary – music and theme composer and conductor for the entire run
- Don Adams – director of 13 episodes and writer of two episodes
- David Davis – associate producer
- Gary Nelson – director of the most episodes
- Bruce Bilson – director of the second-most episodes
- Gerald C. Gardner and Dee Caruso – head writers for the series
- Reza Badiyi – occasional director
- Allan Burns and Chris Hayward – frequent writers and producers
- Stan Burns and Mike Marmer – frequent writers
- Richard Donner – occasional director
- James Komack – writer and director
- Arne Sultan – frequent writer and producer
- Lloyd Turner and Whitey Mitchell – frequent writers and producers of season five

== Characters ==
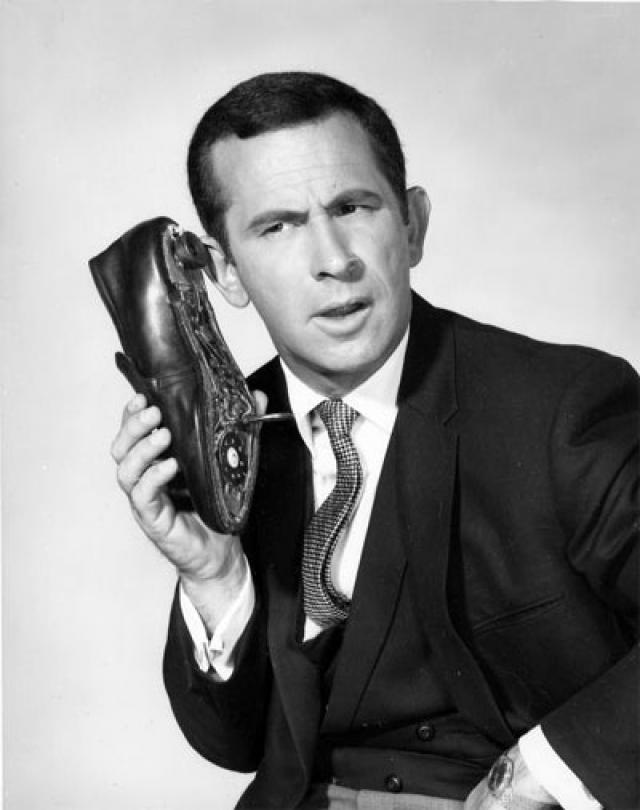
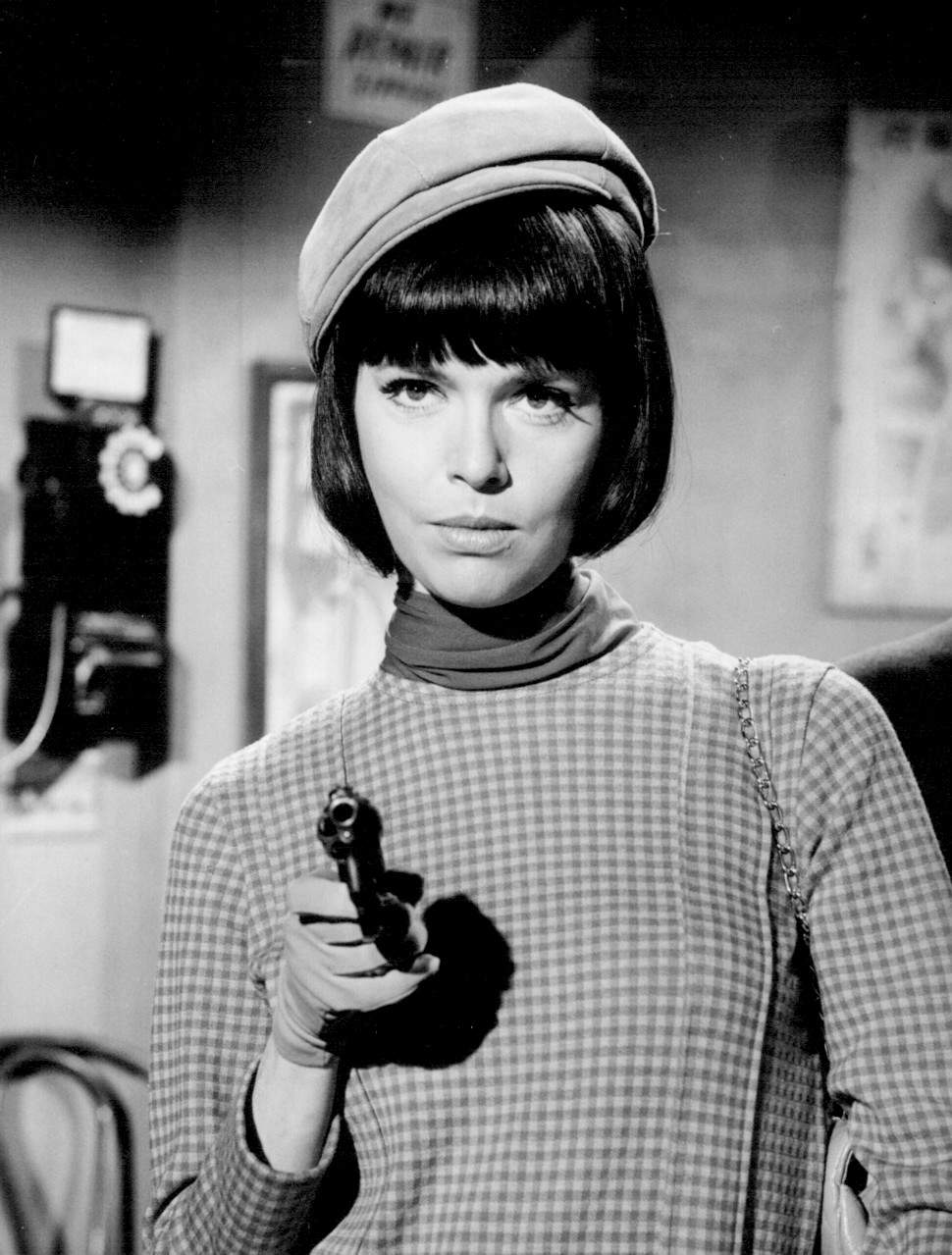
Don Adams (left) and Barbara Feldon (right) portraying Maxwell Smart and Agent 99 respectively.

Maxwell Smart, Agent 86 (Don Adams), is the central character of the series. Despite being a top-secret government agent, he is absurdly clumsy. Yet Smart is also resourceful, skilled in hand-to-hand combat, a proficient marksman, and incredibly lucky; all of this makes him one of CONTROL's top agents. Brooks decided on Smart's code number, 86, as a reference to the slang term, meaning to forcibly eject someone, such as a patron from a bar or casino.

In 1999, TV Guide ranked Maxwell Smart number 19 on its 50 Greatest TV Characters of All Time list. The character appears in every episode (though only briefly in "Ice Station Siegfried", as Don Adams was performing in Las Vegas for two weeks to settle gambling debts).

Agent 99 (Barbara Feldon) works alongside 86 and is another one of the top agents at CONTROL. Her actual name is never revealed. In the episode "A Man Called Smart Part 3" (S2 E30), Max calls her Ernestine and she says, "Too bad that's not my name." In another episode, "99 Loses CONTROL" (S3 E19), she uses the name Susan Hilton, but later in the same episode tells Max that it is not her real name. When 99 marries Max in Season 4, Admiral Hargrade snores when the minister says her name, making it inaudible.

Several instances refer to her high level of professionalism. In one episode the Chief says an assignment requires extreme bravery and competence but since 99 isn't available, Max could do it. According to Feldon, 99 is deeply in love with Max and either overlooks or understands his quirks, while he is clueless about her affection yet often demonstrates his care through his concern for her well-being.

The Chief (Edward Platt) is the head of CONTROL. His first name is revealed to be Thaddeus but his surname is never revealed. On some occasions he uses the "code name" "Harold Clark" for outsiders, but this is understood among CONTROL agents not to be his real name. He is supportive of Agents 86 and 99 and considers them to be his two closest friends, but he is often frustrated with Smart. When he was a field agent, his code name was "Q".

Agent Larabee (Robert Karvelas, Don Adams' cousin) is the Chief's assistant, even more slow-witted and incompetent than Max.

Ludwig Von Siegfried (Bernie Kopell) is a recurring villain, and the vice president in charge of public relations and terror at KAOS, though his title does vary. Despite his gruff and proper demeanor, he is as incompetent as Max.

Starker (often pronounced by Siegfried as Shtarker) (King Moody) is Siegfried's equally ruthless but often inept chief henchman, prone to silly behaviors which annoy his boss as unbecoming of KAOS. His name is the German and Yiddish term for a physically strong man, though at least in the latter tongue there is a noticeable implication of dim-wittedness.

Hymie the Robot (Dick Gautier) is a humanoid robot built by KAOS, but in his first mission, Smart manages to turn him to the side of CONTROL. Hymie had a tendency to take instructions too literally.

Agent 13 (David Ketchum) is an agent who is usually stationed inside unlikely, sometimes impossibly small or unlucky places, such as cigarette machines, washing machines, lockers, trash cans, or fire hydrants. He tends to resent his assignments.

Agent 44 (Victor French) Six episodes (1965–66). French's first role was the insurance man in "Too Many Chiefs", and subsequent episodes as Agent 44. He is the predecessor to Agent 13 in season 1. Agent 13 takes over the function of Agent 44 for seasons 2 to 4, but Agent 44, now played by Al Molinaro, returns in season 5.

Carlson (Stacy Keach Sr.) is a CONTROL scientist and inventor of such gadgets as an umbrella rifle with a high-speed camera in the handle, and edible buttons.

Dr. Steele (Ellen Weston) is a beautiful, sexy, and brilliant CONTROL scientist who develops formulas while undercover as a dancer and strip-tease artist. She remains oblivious to Smart's clearly discomfited attraction to her. The character appeared in three episodes in season 3, replaced the next season by Dr. Simon who has the same cover, played by different actresses in two episodes.

== Production notes ==
=== Gadgets ===
==== Telephones ====
In Get Smart, telephones are concealed in over 50 objects, including a necktie, comb, watch, and a clock. A recurring gag is Max's shoe phone, an idea from Brooks. To use or answer it, he has to take off his shoe. Several variations on the shoe phone were used. In "I Shot 86 Today" (season four), his shoe phone is disguised as a golf shoe, complete with cleats, developed by the attractive armorer Dr. Simon. Smart's shoes sometimes contain other devices housed in the heels: an explosive pellet, a smoke bomb, compressed air capsules that propelled the wearer off the ground, and a suicide pill, which Max believes is for the enemy.

Agent 99 used concealed telephones in her makeup compact and her fingernail. To use the fingernail device, she would pretend to bite her nail nervously while actually talking on her "nail phone."

In February 2002, the prop shoe phone was included in a display titled "Spies: Secrets from the CIA, KGB, and Hollywood", a collection of real and fictional spy gear that exhibited at the Ronald Reagan Presidential Library in Simi Valley, California. Flinders University in South Australia has researched medical applications for shoe phone technology after being inspired by the show.

Gag phones appear in other guises. In the episode "Too Many Chiefs" (season one), Max tells Tanya, the KAOS informer whom he is protecting, that if anyone breaks in, to pick up the house phone, dial 1-1-7, and press the trigger on the handset, which converts it to a gun. The phone-gun is only used once. Max once carried a gun-phone, a revolver with a rotary dial built into the cylinder. In the episode "Satan Place", Max simultaneously holds conversations on seven different phones: the shoe, his tie, his belt, his wallet, a garter, a handkerchief, and a pair of eyeglasses.

Other unusual locations include a garden hose, a car cigarette lighter (with the lighter being hidden in the car phone), a bottle of perfume (Max complains of smelling like a woman), the steering wheel of his car, a painting of Agent 99, the headboard of his bed, a cheese sandwich, lab test tubes (Max grabs the wrong one and splashes himself), a Bunsen burner (Max puts out the flame anytime he pronounces a "p"), a plant in a planter beside the real working phone (operated by the dial of the working phone), and inside another full-sized working phone.

==== Cone of Silence ====
The Cone of Silence from the pilot episode, "Mr. Big" (1965)

In another of the show's recurring gags, Smart often insists on speaking under the "Cone of Silence" when discussing highly confidential things in the Chief's office. The device, consisting of two transparent plastic hemispheres, is electrically lowered on top of Smart and the Chief and is intended to prevent their conversation from being heard outside. The joke is that the apparatus actually makes it impossible for those inside the device–and easy for those outside of it–to hear the conversation. The Cone of Silence first appeared in the pilot episode "Mr. Big", which aired on September 18, 1965. The Cone of Silence scene was shot ahead of the rest of the pilot episode, and was used to sell Get Smart to NBC. The series also depicts a Portable Cone of Silence.

==== Other gadgets ====
Other gadgets include a bullet-proof invisible wall in Max's apartment that lowers from the ceiling, into which Max and others often walk; a camera hidden in a bowl of soup (cream of Technicolor) that takes a picture with a conspicuous flash of the person eating the soup with each spoonful; a mini magnet on a belt, which turns out to be stronger than KAOS's maxi magnet; and a powerful miniature laser weapon in the button of a sports jacket (the "laser blazer").

=== Cars ===
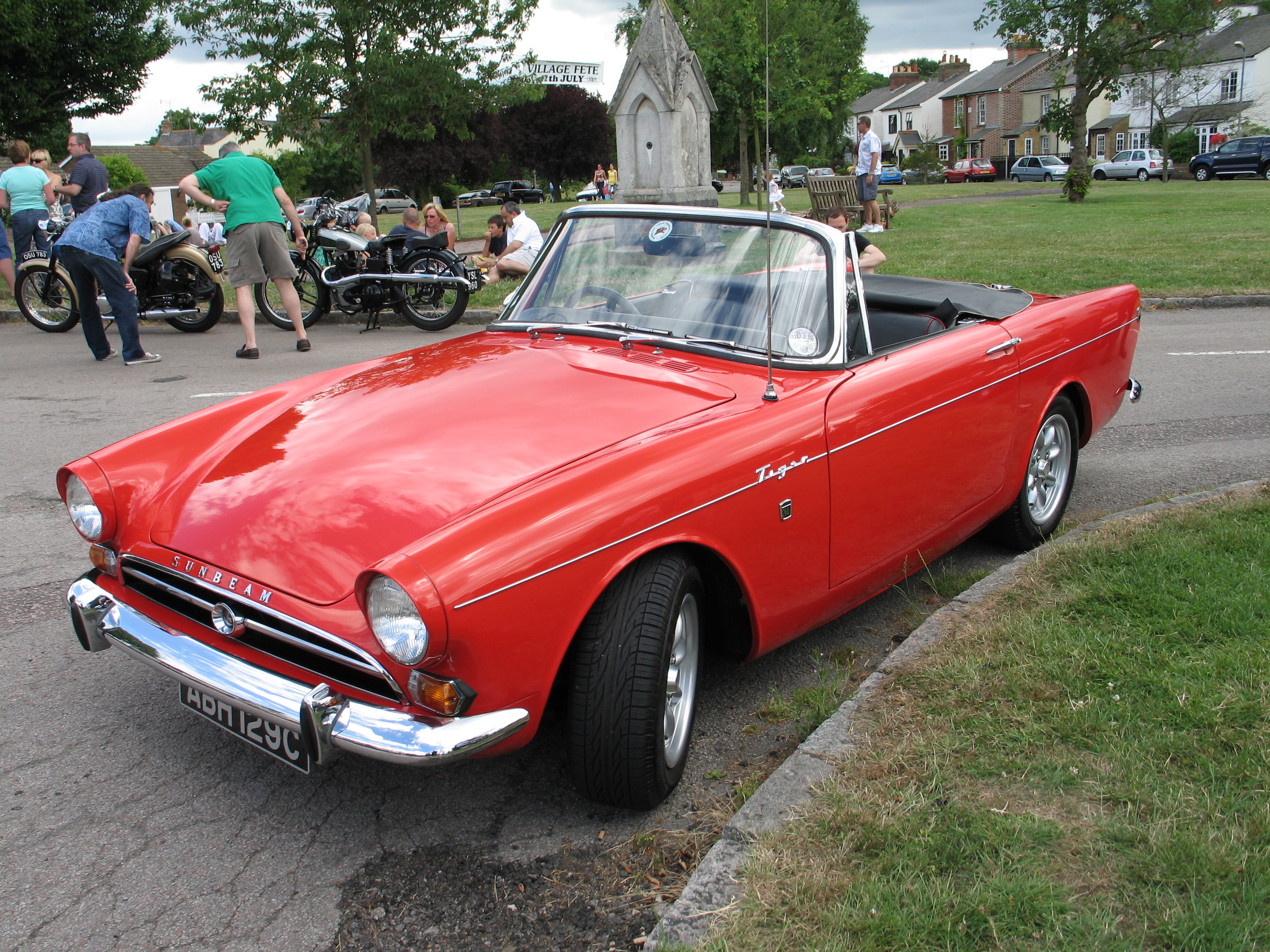
A 1965 Sunbeam Tiger

The car that Smart is seen driving most frequently is a red 1965 Sunbeam Tiger two-seat roadster. This car had various custom features, such as a machine gun, smoke screen, radar tracking, and an ejection seat. The Sunbeam Alpine, upon which the Tiger was based, was used by customizer Gene Winfield because the Alpine's four-cylinder engine afforded more room under the hood than the V8 in the Tiger. AMT, Winfield's employer, made a model kit of the Tiger, complete with hidden weapons. It is the only kit of the Tiger, and has been reissued multiple times as a stock Tiger.

Adams received the Sunbeam and drove it for 10 years after the end of the show. It was wrecked and repaired several times, and its current whereabouts are unknown.

In the black-and-white pilot episode only, Smart drives a 1961 Ferrari 250 GT PF Spider Cabriolet.

In the opening credits, the Tiger was used for seasons one and two. In seasons three and four, Smart drives a light blue Volkswagen Karmann Ghia, because Volkswagen had become a sponsor of the show. The Volkswagen was never used in the body of the show. In season five (1969–1970), Buick became a show sponsor, so the Tiger was replaced with a gold 1969 Opel GT, which also appears in the body of the show.

In season four (1968–1969), Adams uses a yellow Citroën 2CV in the wedding episode "With Love and Twitches", and a blue 1968 Ford Shelby Mustang GT500 convertible with a tan interior and four seats (as required by the plot) in the episodes "A Tale of Two Tails" and "The Laser Blazer".

In the short-lived 1995 TV series, Smart is trying to sell the Karmann Ghia through the classified ads.

In Get Smart, Again!, Smart is seen driving a red 1986 Alfa Romeo Spider Veloce.

The Sunbeam Tiger, the Karmann Ghia, and the Opel GT all make brief appearances in the 2008 film. The Sunbeam Tiger is seen in the CONTROL Museum, along with the original shoe phone, which Smart also briefly uses. The Opel GT is driven by Bernie Kopell and is rear-ended by a truck. Smart steals the Karmann Ghia to continue his escape.

== Notable guest stars ==
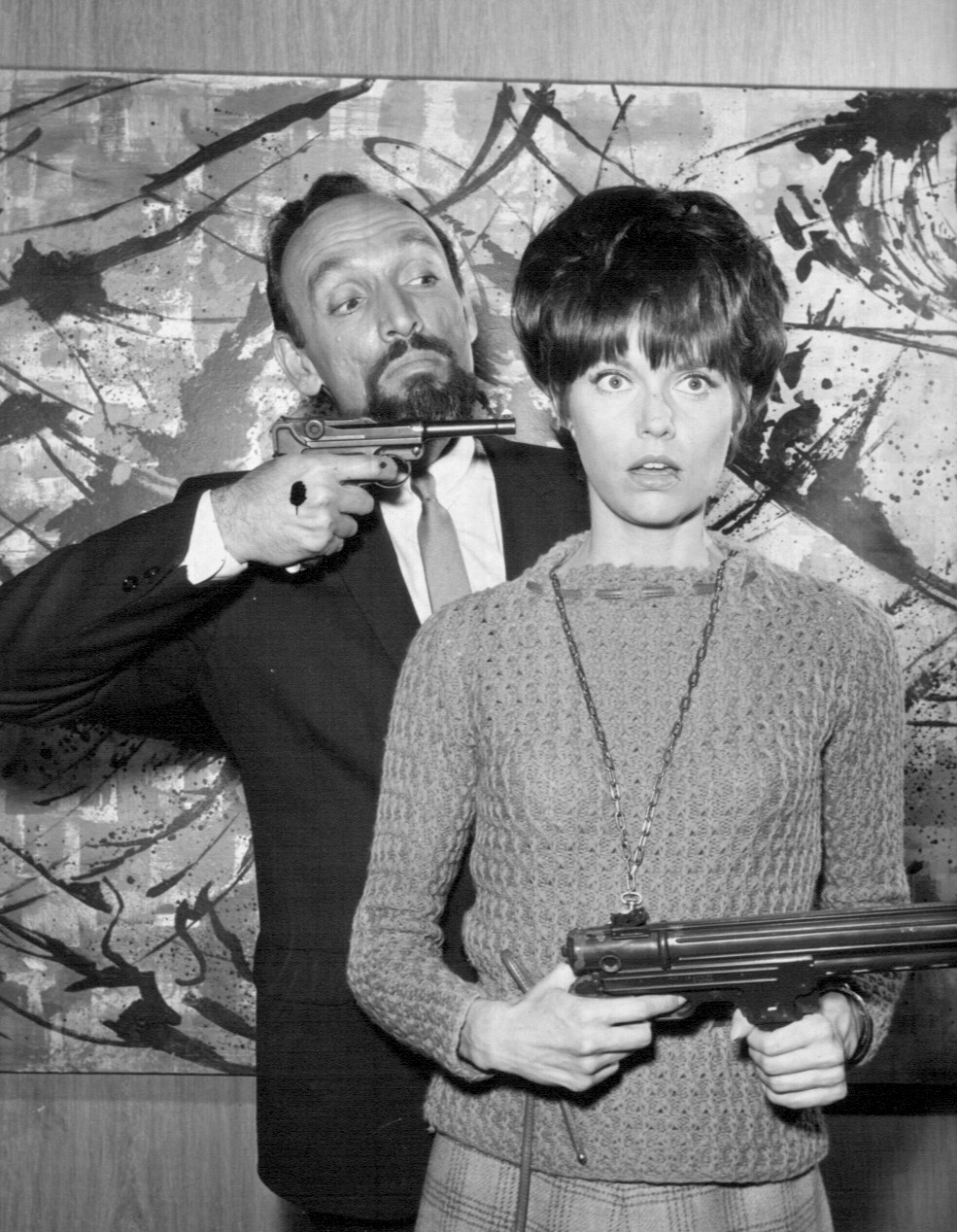
A KAOS agent, played by Joseph Ruskin, stops Agent 99.

Get Smart used several familiar character actors and celebrities, and some future stars, in guest roles, including:

- Ian Abercrombie
- Steve Allen
- Merry Anders
- Barbara Bain
- Billy Barty
- Jacques Bergerac
- Lee Bergere
- Shelley Berman
- Milton Berle
- Joseph Bernard
- Lynn Borden
- Ernest Borgnine
- Tom Bosley
- Geraldine Brooks
- Kathie Browne
- Victor Buono
- Carol Burnett
- John Byner
- James Caan (uncredited)
- Howard Caine
- Johnny Carson
- Jack Cassidy
- Del Close
- Ellen Corby
- Wally Cox
- Broderick Crawford
- Robert Culp
- John Dehner
- Phyllis Diller
- Jane Dulo (recurring; as 99's mother)
- Michael Dunn
- Robert Easton
- Dana Elcar
- Bill Erwin
- Jamie Farr
- John Fiedler
- Joey Forman
- Lisa Gaye
- Alice Ghostley
- Jack Gilford
- Stu Gilliam
- Arlene Golonka
- Leo Gordon
- Farley Granger
- Buddy Hackett
- Sid Haig
- Jonathan Harris
- Hugh Hefner
- Marcel Hillaire
- Bob Hope
- John Hoyt
- Conrad Janis
- Gordon Jump
- Kitty Kelly
- Helen Kleeb
- Ted Knight
- James Komack
- Nancy Kovack
- Kurt Kreuger
- Martin Landau
- Charles Lane
- Len Lesser
- Laurie Main
- Kenneth Mars
- Judith McConnell
- Pat McCormick
- Robert Middleton
- Howard Morton
- Burt Mustin
- Mace Neufeld
- Barry Newman
- Julie Newmar
- Leonard Nimoy
- Simon Oakland
- Alan Oppenheimer
- Pat Paulsen
- Angelique Pettyjohn
- Regis Philbin
- Tom Poston
- Ann Prentiss
- Vincent Price
- Maudie Prickett (appeared in different episodes as different characters)
- John S. Ragin
- Don Rickles
- Alex Rocco
- Cesar Romero
- Joseph Ruskin
- Vito Scotti
- Gale Sondergaard
- Larry Storch
- Vic Tayback
- Torin Thatcher
- Janet Waldo
- Fred Willard
- Jason Wingreen
- Dana Wynter
- Victor Sen Yung

Both Bill Dana and Jonathan Harris, with whom Adams appeared on The Bill Dana Show, also appeared, as did Adams' father, William Yarmy, brother, Dick Yarmy, and daughter, Caroline Adams.

The series featured several cameo appearances by famous actors and comedians, sometimes uncredited and often comedian friends of Adams. Johnny Carson appeared, credited as "special guest conductor", in "Aboard the Orient Express". Carson returned for an uncredited cameo as a royal footman in the third-season episode "The King Lives?" Other performers to make cameo appearances included Steve Allen, Milton Berle, Ernest Borgnine, Wally Cox, Robert Culp (as a waiter in an episode sending up Culp's I Spy), Phyllis Diller, Buddy Hackett, Bob Hope, and Martin Landau.

Actress Rose Michtom, the real-life aunt of the show's executive producer Leonard Stern, appeared in at least 44 episodes—usually as a background extra with no speaking role. In the season-one episode "Too Many Chiefs", when she is shown in a photograph, Max refers to her as "my Aunt Rose", but the Chief corrects Max by saying that she is actually KAOS agent Alexi Sebastian disguised as Max's Aunt Rose. Fans refer to her as "Aunt Rose" in all of her dozens of appearances, though her character is never actually named in most of them.

== Broadcast ==
The series was broadcast on NBC-TV from September 18, 1965, to September 13, 1969, after which it moved to the CBS network for its final season, running from September 26, 1969, to September 11, 1970, with 138 total episodes produced. During its five-season run, Get Smart broke the Nielsen Top 30 twice.

It ranked at number 12 during its first season, and at number 22 during its second season, before falling out of the top 30 for its last three seasons. The series won seven Emmy Awards, and it was nominated for another 14 Emmys and two Golden Globe Awards. In 1995, the series was briefly resurrected, starring Adams and Feldon with Andy Dick as Max's and 99's son Zack Smart and Elaine Hendrix as 66.

Season	Episodes	Originally released		
Season	Episodes	First released	Last released	Network
1	30	September 18, 1965	May 7, 1966	NBC
2	30	September 17, 1966	April 22, 1967	NBC
3	26	September 16, 1967	April 6, 1968	NBC
4	26	September 21, 1968	March 29, 1969	NBC
5	26	September 26, 1969	May 15, 1970	CBS

== Emmy awards ==
Year	Category	Recipient
1967	Outstanding Continued Performance by an Actor in a Comedy	Don Adams
1967	Outstanding Writing Achievement in Comedy	Buck Henry, Leonard Stern
1968	Outstanding Comedy Series	Burt Nodella, producer
1968	Outstanding Continued Performance by an Actor in a Comedy	Don Adams
1968	Outstanding Directorial Achievement in Comedy	Bruce Bilson
1969	Outstanding Comedy Series	Burt Nodella
1969	Outstanding Continued Performance by an Actor in a Comedy	Don Adams

== Adaptations ==
=== Films ===
Four feature-length films have been produced following the end of the NBC/CBS run of the TV series:

- 1980: The Nude Bomb (dir. Clive Donner)—also known as The Return of Maxwell Smart or Maxwell Smart and the Nude Bomb—was theatrically released. It was panned by critics and barely returned its budget at the box office.
- 1989: The made-for-TV Get Smart, Again! (dir. Gary Nelson) on ABC
- 2008: Get Smart (dir. Peter Segal) starring Steve Carell as Smart alongside Anne Hathaway as 99. Distributed by Warner Bros., the film includes a dedication to Adams and Platt, who had died in 2005 and 1974, respectively. It received mixed critical reviews but was a commercial success, earning over $230 million worldwide.
  - 2008: Get Smart's Bruce and Lloyd: Out of Control (dir. Gil Junger), a made-for-DVD spin-off revolving around minor characters, Bruce and Lloyd (Masi Oka and Nate Torrence), the masterminds behind the high-tech gadgets that are often used by Smart.

In October 2008, it was reported that Warner Bros., Village Roadshow Pictures and Mosaic Media Group were producing a sequel. Carell and Hathaway were set to return, but the status of other cast members had not been announced. As of 2019, Get Smart 2 is no longer in development

=== Television ===
Get Smart, Again! inspired the development of a short-lived 1995 weekly series on Fox also titled Get Smart, with Adams and Feldon reprising their characters. Maxwell Smart is now the Chief of Control as their bumbling son, Zach (Andy Dick), becomes Control's star agent. Zach's twin sister is mentioned but unnamed and never seen – though it is said that the new leader of KAOS, a hidden female figure, would have been revealed as the other twin if the show had continued. 99 is now a congresswoman.

The beginning teaser shows Maxwell Smart and Zach driving to Control headquarters in a car wash separately. Smart, Zach and Zach's partner Agent 66 (Elaine Hendrix) cram themselves into a secret elevator: a soda machine which "disappears". A cleaning lady sits down in the open space when all of a sudden the machine pops up and knocks the woman into the ceiling.

A late episode of the 1995 series shows that just as Siegfried is leaving a room, Maxwell Smart accidentally activates an atomic bomb just before the end of the show. The teaser for the episode shows an atomic bomb going off. This ending is similar to a device used by the Get Smart-inspired series Sledge Hammer! at the end of its first season. Hopes for the series were not high, as Andy Dick had already moved on to NewsRadio, which premiered weeks later in 1995.

With the revival series on Fox, Get Smart became the first television franchise to air new episodes, or made-for-TV films, on each of the aforementioned current four major American television networks, although several TV shows in the 1940s and 1950s aired on NBC, CBS, ABC and DuMont. The different versions of Get Smart did not all feature the original lead cast.

Get Smart was parodied on a sketch in the Mexican comedy show De Nuez en Cuando called "Super Agente 3.1486", making fun of the Spanish title of the series (Super Agente 86) and the way the series is dubbed.

An early MadTV sketch titled "Get Smarty" placed the Maxwell Smart character in situations from the film Get Shorty.

An episode of F Troop called "Spy, Counterspy, Counter–counterspy" featured Pat Harrington Jr. imitating Don Adams as secret agent "B. Wise".

The Simpsons episode "Bart vs. Lisa vs. the Third Grade" parodies the opening of Get Smart in the couch gag. Homer goes through many futuristic doors and passageways until he reaches the phone booth, falls through the floor, and lands on the couch, with the rest of the family already seated. This couch gag was later repeated in two other The Simpsons episodes: "The Fat and the Furriest" and "A Star is Torn".

=== Adams in similar roles ===
In the 1960s, Adams had a supporting role on the sitcom The Bill Dana Show (1963–1965) as the hopelessly inept hotel detective Byron Glick. His speech mannerisms, catchphrases ("Would you believe...?"), and other comedy bits were adapted for his "Maxwell Smart" role in Get Smart.

In 1971, Adams starred as Sgt. Lennie Crooks, a bumbling police detective similar to the bumbling secret agent he played on Get Smart, on The Partners. His partner and best friend, Detective George Robinson, was a not-quite-as-bumbling policeman played by Rupert Crosse. They reported to Captain Andrews, played by John Doucette, a similarly harried supervisor in the tradition of Edward Platt's "Chief." Robert Karvelas, who had played Agent Larabee on Get Smart, had a recurring role as Freddie Butler, who felt compelled to confess to crimes he did not commit. The series only lasted a half-season.

When WCGV-TV, a new independent station in Milwaukee, Wisconsin, signed on the air in 1980, Adams did in-house promos as Agent 86 to let viewers know when the reruns of Get Smart aired on the station by using his shoephone.

In one of Adams' five appearances as a guest passenger in the series The Love Boat, his character, even when he thought he had been shot, makes no attempt to visit the ship's doctor. The role of the doctor in The Love Boat was played by Bernie Kopell, who played Siegfried in Get Smart.

In 1982, Adams starred as Maxwell Smart in a series of local commercials for New York City electronics chain Savemart. The slogan was "Get Smart. Get SaveMart Smart." In addition, Adams starred in a series of commercials for White Castle in 1992, paying homage to his Get Smart character with his catchphrase "Would you believe...?"

In the 1980s, Adams provided the similar voice of the titular bungling cyborg secret agent in the animated series Inspector Gadget. This later became a feature film in 1999 starring Matthew Broderick in the title role of Inspector John Brown Gadget, in which Adams had a cameo, and its prequel series Gadget Boy & Heather. Neither was directly related to Get Smart.

In the mid-1980s, Adams reprised his role of Maxwell Smart for a series of telephone banking commercials for Empire of America Federal Savings Bank in Buffalo, New York. The telephone banking service was called SmartLine. Sherwin Greenberg Productions, a video production company and bank subsidiary, produced radio and television ads, and a series of still photos for use in promotional flyers that featured Adams' Maxwell Smart character wearing the familiar trenchcoat and holding a shoe phone to his ear. The television commercials were videotaped in Sherwin Greenberg Productions' studio on a set that resembled an old alleyway, with artificial fog effects. The production company secured a lookalike of the red Alpine that Adams used in the television series, making it a memorable promotion for those familiar with the series of nearly 20 years earlier.

In the late 1980s, Adams portrayed Smart in a series of TV commercials for Toyota New Zealand, for the 1990 model Toyota Starlet. While it is customary for the actor to go to the foreign location for shooting, Adams' apparent intense dislike of long-distance flying meant that the New Zealand specification car had to be shipped to the US for filming.

In the late 1990s, he appeared in another series of Canadian commercials for a dial-around long-distance carrier. In the movie Back to the Beach (1987), Adams played the Harbor Master, who used several of Maxwell Smart's catchphrases, including an exchange in which Frankie Avalon's character did a vague impression of Siegfried.

In 1989, Adams played Smart in a TV commercial for Kmart. He was seen talking on his trademark shoe phone, telling the Chief about the great selection of electronics available at Kmart. An exact replica of himself approaches him, and Smart says, "Don't tell me you're a double agent." This was a reference to a running gag on the original series, in which Max detected some sort of setback or danger, and would say to 99, "Don't tell me..." and then 99 replied by stating a confirmation of whatever Max was afraid to hear, to which Max would always respond, "I asked you not to tell me that!"

Adams appeared in a number of McDonald's television commercials, which featured numerous stars of TV series viewed as classic or with nostalgia, such as Barbara Billingsley from Leave It to Beaver, Buddy Ebsen from The Beverly Hillbillies, Bob Denver from Gilligan's Island and Al Lewis from The Munsters.

Adams starred in a Canadian sitcom titled Check It Out in which he played a supermarket manager. Adams' running jokes in Get Smart, such as "the old [something something] trick" and "I told you not to tell me that!" were used in the show but in a supermarket setting.

=== Books and comics ===
A series of novels based on characters and dialog of the series was written by William Johnston and published in the Tempo Books series by Grosset & Dunlap in the late 1960s. Dell Comics published a comic book for eight issues during 1966 and 1967, drawn in part by Steve Ditko.

=== Proposed movies ===
The 1966 Batman movie, made during that TV show's original run, prompted other television shows to propose similar films. The only one completed was Munster Go Home (1966), which was a box office flop, causing the cancellation of other projects, including the Get Smart movie. The script for that movie was turned into a three-part episode, "A Man Called Smart", which aired in April 1967.

During the 1980s, Dick Gautier was set to star in a Hymie the Robot spin-off film to be made for TV, following Hymie being recalled and then refurbished by the government. The film was never produced due to legal issues surrounding the ownership of Get Smart.

In 2026, it has been announced that John Mulaney is in early talks to star as Agent Maxwell Smart in a new film reimaginingat Warner Bros. Pictures. Being in its early stages of development, with Seth Grahame-Smith attached to write the script and Charles Roven and Andrew Lazar signed on to produce.

=== Play ===
Christopher Sergel adapted a play in 1967, Get Smart, based on Brooks's and Henry's pilot episode.

== Home media and rights ==
All five seasons are available as box sets in Region 1 (United States, Canada, and others) and Region 4 (Australia, New Zealand, and others). The Region 1 discs are published by HBO Home Video, and Region 4 by Time Life Video. Each Region 1 box contains 4 discs. Region 4 editions have a 5th disc with bonus material. Region 4 editions are also available as individual discs, with four to five episodes per disc. The Season 1 set was released in both regions in 2008. Seasons 2 and 3 box sets were released in Region 4 in July 2008. Seasons 4 and 5 were released in Region 4 in November 2008. Seasons 2–5 in Region 1 were released throughout 2009.

Another box set of the complete series is available in both regions, first published in 2006 by Time Life Video. In 2009, the Region 1 edition was replaced by an HBO edition, and became more widely available. All editions contain a 5th disc for each season, with bonus material. The set has 25 discs altogether.

The first four seasons were produced for NBC by Talent Associates. When it moved to CBS at the start of Season 5, it became an in-house production, with Talent Associates as a silent partner. The series was sold to NBC Films for syndication.

Over decades, US distribution has changed from National Telefilm Associates to Republic Pictures, to Worldvision Enterprises, to Paramount Domestic Television, to CBS Paramount Domestic Television, to CBS Television Distribution, to the current distributor, CBS Media Ventures. For decades, the syndication rights of all but a handful of the fifth-season episodes (that season being originally co-owned by Talent Associates and CBS) were encumbered with restrictions and reporting requirements.

As a result, most of that season was rarely seen in syndication. They were shown with more regularity on Nick at Nite and TV Land. The distribution changes, including the loosening of restrictions on the fifth season, were the result of corporate changes, especially the 2006 split of Viacom (owners of Paramount Pictures) into two companies.

HBO owns the copyrights to the series itself, due to Time-Life Films' 1977 acquisition of Talent Associates. Home videos are distributed by HBO Home Video. For a time the DVD release was only available through Time-Life, a former Time Warner division. Warner Bros. Television owns international distribution rights.

In August 2015, the entire series was officially released on digital streaming platforms for the first time in preparation for its 50th anniversary.
