= List of Julia episodes =

This is a list of episodes of the television series Julia.

== Series overview ==
Season	Episodes	Originally released	
Season	Episodes	First released	Last released
1	30	September 17, 1968	April 15, 1969
2	30	September 16, 1969	April 28, 1970
3	26	September 15, 1970	March 23, 1971

== Episodes ==
=== Season 1 (1968–69) ===
No. overall	No. in season	Title	Directed by	Written by	Original release date
1	1	"Mama's Man"	Hal Kanter	Hal Kanter	September 17, 1968
Julia Baker, a nurse whose husband died in the Vietnam War, applies for a job at an aerospace company.
2	2	"The Interview"	Barry Shear	Hal Kanter	September 24, 1968
Julia does an interview with Dr. Morton Chegley at the aerospace company.
3	3	"Sorry, Right Number"	Coby Ruskin	Ben Gershman and Gene Boland	October 1, 1968
Julia does well on her first day at work, but her situation at home is something else.
4	4	"Homework Isn't Housework"	Ezra Stone	Hal Kanter	October 8, 1968
Julia hires a mother's helper who seems more focused on homework than housework.
5	5	"The Unloneliest Night of the Week"	Coby Ruskin	Jim McGinn	October 15, 1968
Julia has enough trouble taking care of the Waggedorn children when an old Army buddy of her late husband's shows up.
6	6	"Who's a Freud of Ginger Wolfe?"	Ezra Stone	Hal Kanter	October 22, 1968
Julia is concerned about Corey since his school paintings are all in black.
7	7	"Am I, Pardon the Expression, Blacklisted?"	James Sheldon	Robert Goodwin	October 29, 1968
Julia fears she may lose her job when her security clearance at the space company is delayed.
8	8	"The Champ Is No Chump"	Bernard Wiesen	Hal Kanter	November 5, 1968
Julia goes on a quiz show and wins a date with a heavyweight boxing champ.
9	9	"Too Good to Be Bad"	Ezra Stone	Story by : Bert Ford; Teleplay by : Bert Ford and Ben Solomon	November 12, 1968
Julia is made the target of two matchmaking schemers.
10	10	"Paint Your Waggedorn"	Coby Ruskin	Harry Winkler & Harry Dolan	November 19, 1968
Julia tells Corey all about prejudice when they encounter a racist neighbor.
11	11	"Farewell, My Friends, Hello"	Hal Kanter	Hal Kanter	November 26, 1968
A messenger who's about to retire sends Julia a lot of gifts. Final acting appearance of Groucho Marx. (Filmed after, but released before, his final film role in Skidoo, which was issued three weeks after this episode aired.)
12	12	"The Solid Brass Snow Job"	Ezra Stone	Ben Solomon and Gene Boland	December 3, 1968
A salesman tries to get the clinic's account through Julia and Corey.
13	13	"Designers Don't Always Have Designs"	Ezra Stone	Ferdinand Leon and Earl Barret	December 10, 1968
Dr. Chegley and Hannah fix Julia up with a single engineer.
14	14	"I'm Dreaming of a Black Christmas"	Coby Ruskin	Jim McGinn	December 17, 1968
It's Christmastime, and Corey wants to know if Santa Claus is black or white.
15	15	"The One and Only Genuine, Original Family Uncle"	Ezra Stone	Ferdinand Leon and Earl Barret	December 31, 1968
Julie's uncle Lou, a former vaudeville star, pays a visit.
16	16	"How Sharper Than a Baby's Tooth"	Bernard Wiesen	Joanna Lee and Ben Gershman	January 7, 1969
When Corey has a toothache, Julia thinks it requires a visit to the dentist.
17	17	"Matchmaker, Break Me a Match"	Hal Kanter	Harry Winkler & Harry Dolan	January 14, 1969
Julia isn't so sure about her latest suitor since he's asking to borrow $500 ($4,400 today).
18	18	"Dancer in the Dark"	Barry Shear	Hal Kanter	January 21, 1969
Dr. Chegley enlists Julia to help recruit a football hero -- a black militant -- into the company.
19	19	"How to Keep Your Wig Warm"	Coby Ruskin	Ferdinand Leon and Earl Barret	January 28, 1969
Marie resorts to buying a wig when her husband seems to lose interest in her.
20	20	"Sticks and Stones Can Break My Pizza"	Ezra Stone	Story by : Robert Goodwin; Teleplay by : Ferdinand Leon and Earl Barret	February 4, 1969
A pizza delivery boy calls Julia names.
21	21	"A Little Chicken Soup Never Hurt Anybody"	Ezra Stone	Hal Kanter	February 11, 1969
Julia's landlord locks himself in his apartment and refuses to tell anyone his problem.
22	22	"Wanda Means Well"	Coby Ruskin	Jim McGinn	February 18, 1969
Although Earl Waggedorn's aunt Wanda means well, Julia is the first black person she's ever met.
23	23	"Cupid's No Computer"	Ezra Stone	Ben Gershman	February 25, 1969
Julia fixes her landlord up with Hannah.
24	24	"I Thought I Saw a Two-Timer"	Coby Ruskin	Ferdinand Leon and Earl Barret	March 4, 1969
Julia doesn't know what to do when she sees Marie's husband with a blonde.
25	25	"It Takes Two to Tangle"	Bernard Wiesen	Story by : Michael Fessier; Teleplay by : Michael Fessier and Hal Kanter	March 11, 1969
Julia is asked to contribute to Dr. Chegley's fundraising project.
26	26	"Home of the Braves"	Coby Ruskin	Harry Winkler & Harry Dolan	March 18, 1969
When Earl joins a father-son club, Julia tries to find a father for Corey.
27	27	"A Baby's a Nice Nuisance"	Coby Ruskin	Helen McAvity	March 25, 1969
Thinking his baby brother gets more attention, Earl runs away from home and moves in with Julia and Corey.
28	28	"Gone with the Draft"	Ezra Stone	Hal Kanter	April 1, 1969
Julia's housekeeper suddenly leaves town after getting an odd phone call.
29	29	"The Doctor's Dilemma"	Hal Kanter	Hal Kanter	April 8, 1969
Julia tries to deal with both Corey's babysitter and Dr. Chegley's illness.
30	30	"Love Is a Many Sighted Thing"	Bernard Wiesen	Ferdinand Leon and Earl Barret	April 15, 1969
Julia's husband-hunting friend ends up falling for her latest suitor.

=== Season 2 (1969–70) ===
No. overall	No. in season	Title	Directed by	Written by	Original release date
31	1	"A Tale of Two Sitters"	Bernard Wiesen	Hal Kanter	September 16, 1969
Dr. Chegley's 92-year-old uncle fills in while he's out of town.
32	2	"The Wheel Deal"	Ezra Stone	Phil Leslie	September 23, 1969
Dr. Chegley tries to help Julia fix her car. (Guest starring Robert Guillaume as auto dealer Robert Barron.)
33	3	"The Undergraduate"	Coby Ruskin	Earl Barret	September 30, 1969
Julia is concerned that the undergraduate she hired to help out at home may be working too hard. (Guest Starring Ketty Lester as Rita Hopkins and Glynn Turman as Rita's 19 year old cousin and college student, Jimmy James.)
34	4	"Two's a Family, Three's a Crowd"	Fletcher Markle	Arthur Alsberg & Don Nelson	October 14, 1969
When Julia brings a little girl home, Corey thinks she intends to adopt her.
35	5	"Tanks for the Memory"	Fletcher Markle	Ben Gershman	October 21, 1969
Julia attends a local concert featuring Gary Crosby.
36	6	"For Whom the Wedding Bell Tolls"	Coby Ruskin	Earl Barret	October 28, 1969
A teenage boy develops a crush on Julia.
37	7	"You Can't Beat Drums"	Ezra Stone	Harry Winkler & Harry Dolan	November 4, 1969
Julia's drummer neighbor is driving her crazy. (Guest starring a young Ralph Johnson, who later would join Earth, Wind & Fire)
38	8	"Tie Wolf"	Bernard Wiesen	Hal Kanter	November 11, 1969
Corey gets into tying Indian knots.
39	9	"Romeo and Julia"	Coby Ruskin	Bob Marcus	November 18, 1969
Julia is set up on a blind date.
40	10	"The Grass Is Sometimes Greener"	Hal Kanter	Alan J. Levitt	November 25, 1969
Julia receives a job offer, but it requires her to move.
41	11	"The Eve of Adam"	Ezra Stone	Ben Gershman	December 2, 1969
A free-thinking artist inspires Corey to be expressive with his own work.
42	12	"So's Your Old Uncle"	Bernard Wiesen	Ben Gershman	December 9, 1969
Dr. Chegley's uncle Norton is back in town.
43	13	"Hilda's No Help"	Hollingsworth Morse	Jim McGinn	December 16, 1969
Julia must entertain Leonard's sister Hilda, who's just as goofy as Wanda.
44	14	"Temper Also Fugits"	Luther James	Howard Leeds	December 30, 1969
The pressures of home and work make Julia lose her temper.
45	15	"The Prisoner of Brenda"	Hollingsworth Morse	Robert A. Cinader and Ferdinand Leon	January 6, 1970
Julia hires kooky Brenda as a babysitter.
46	16	"The Dates of Wrath"	Bernard Wiesen	Hal Kanter	January 13, 1970
Julia is caught in the middle of a tug-of-war between two suitors.
47	17	"The Jolly Green Midget"	Bernard Wiesen	Phil Leslie	January 20, 1970
Corey claims to have seen an alien.
48	18	"Sioux Me, Don't Woo Me"	Hollingsworth Morse	Harry Winkler & Harry Dolan	January 27, 1970
Julia hires a Native American as a stand-in father for Corey's club meeting.
49	19	"Charity Begins with Chegley"	Hollingsworth Morse	Ralph Goodman and Jai Rich	February 3, 1970
Julia enlists Dr. Chegley to help her find jobs for a sick child's proud parents.
50	20	"Father of the Bribe"	Hollingsworth Morse	Story by : Sherli Evans Goldman and Robert A. Cinader; Teleplay by : Robert A. Cinader	February 10, 1970
Corey and Earl fight for the attention of a new friend.
51	21	"Call Me by My Rightful Number"	Don Ameche	Arthur Alsberg & Don Nelson	February 17, 1970
Julia and her colleagues do everything they can to help a sick boy who lives 3,000 miles away.
52	22	"Gone with the Whim"	Sid McCoy	Robert A. Cinader and Ferdinand Leon	February 24, 1970
Julia is forced to deal with a jealous neighbor and a zealous efficiency expert.
53	23	"Charlie's Chance"	Richard Lang	Hal Kanter	March 3, 1970
When Julia goes on vacation, chaos ensues for both Dr. Chegley and Mr. Cooper.
54	24	"I'll Be Yours"	Ezra Stone	Hal Kanter	March 10, 1970
Julia's feeling lonely without Corey, who's away visiting relatives.
55	25	"The Divine Devine"	Bernard Wiesen	Robert A. Cinader and Hal Kanter	March 17, 1970
Julia's cousin Sara arrives in town to fulfill her dream of becoming an actress.
56	26	"Sara's Second Part"	Bernard Wiesen	Hal Kanter	March 24, 1970
Julia's cousin Sara continues to follow her dream of being an actress.
57	27	"Corey for President"	Hollingsworth Morse	Bucky Searles & Al Lewis	April 7, 1970
Corey runs against Earl for class president.
58	28	"The Switch Sitters"	Bernard Wiesen	Ben Gershman	April 14, 1970
Strange things are happening to Julia and Dr. Chegley.
59	29	"Absence Makes the Heart Glow"	Coby Ruskin	Hal Kanter	April 21, 1970
Julia, Chegley and Corey go through little melodramas.
60	30	"Bunny Hug"	Hal Kanter	Ben Gershman	April 28, 1970
Hannah's latest suitor is one Bernard Henderson.

=== Season 3 (1970–71) ===
No. overall	No. in season	Title	Directed by	Written by	Original release date
61	1	"Ready, Aim, Fired"	Coby Ruskin	Hal Kanter	September 15, 1970
A budget cut puts Julia's job in jeopardy.
62	2	"Half Past Sick"	Bernard Wiesen	Hal Kanter	September 22, 1970
Julia's sick and her friends are trying to make her feel better.
63	3	"Little Boys Lost"	Ezra Stone	Hal Kanter	September 29, 1970
Julia drives the kids on a disastrous trip to Nevada.
64	4	"Altar Ego"	Ezra Stone	Arthur Alsberg & Don Nelson	October 6, 1970
Hannah has a wedding in Las Vegas.
65	5	"Tanks Again"	Ezra Stone	Ben Gershman	October 13, 1970
Julia encounters Gary Crosby once again on her Las Vegas adventure.
66	6	"Kim an' Horror"	Coby Ruskin	Alan J. Levitt	October 20, 1970
Julia tries to convince Corey that girls are as human as boys.
67	7	"Magna Cum Lover"	Bernard Wiesen	Jean Holloway	October 27, 1970
Julia begins her courtship with Steve Bruce.
68	8	"Bowled Over"	Richard Lang	Ben Gershman	November 10, 1970
Julia takes a shot at bowling in order to impress Steve.
69	9	"Long Time No Ski"	Ezra Stone	Alan J. Levitt	November 17, 1970
Jealous of his mother's relationship with Steve, Corey accompanies them on a ski trip.
70	10	"Smoke Scream"	Coby Ruskin	Hal Kanter	November 24, 1970
Julia starts an anti-smoking campaign when she catches Corey with a cigarette.
71	11	"Parents Can Be Pains"	Bernard Wiesen	Sidney Morse	December 1, 1970
Julia faces the consequences of leaving Corey alone.
72	12	"Essay Can You See?"	Ezra Stone	Blanche Franklin	December 8, 1970
Corey enters an essay contest in order to win a TV for his mother.
73	13	"That New Black Magic"	Richard Lang	Jim McGinn	December 22, 1970
Julia and Corey attend a youngster's homey birthday party.
74	14	"Two for the Toad"	Jay Sandrich	Frank Fox & Hendrik Vollaerts	December 29, 1970
Corey has problems hiding his pet frog.
75	15	"Kids Is a Four Letter Word"	Richard Lang	Sidney Morse	January 5, 1971
Corey is saying bad words. Fred Williamson guest stars as Steve Bruce and counsels Corey about using bad language.
76	16	"Cousin of the Bride"	Bernard Wiesen	Robert A. Cinader	January 12, 1971
Julia's cousin Sara has returned to ask for help with wedding arrangements. Diana Sands guest stars as cousin Sara.
77	17	"Cool Hand Bruce"	Ezra Stone	Harry Winkler & Harry Dolan	January 19, 1971
Julia and Bruce go to a charity ball. Bob Hope makes a guest appearance as himself.
78	18	"Toast Melba"	Coby Ruskin	Hal Kanter	January 26, 1971
With Dr. Chegley overworked, his wife attempts to slow him down.
79	19	"Courting Time"	Bernard Wiesen	Story by : Phil Leslie; Teleplay by : Phil Leslie and Robert A. Cinader	February 2, 1971
Julia's relationship with Steve is strained when he prosecutes her cousin in court.
80	20	"Strictly for the Birds"	Richard Lang	Milton Pascal & Sam Locke	February 9, 1971
A family of birds nest in Julia's home.
81	21	"Corey's High-Q"	Ezra Stone	Sidney Morse	February 16, 1971
Corey's high IQ may get him sent to a private school.
82	22	"Paper Tigers"	Richard Lang	Phil Leslie	February 23, 1971
The kids enter a contest that leads to everyone collecting old newspapers like crazy.
83	23	"Swing Low, Sweet Charity"	Bernard Wiesen	Al Schwartz & Bill Freedman	March 2, 1971
Julia meets a TV kiddie star at a charity event.
84	24	"Anniversary Faults"	Ezra Stone	Alan J. Levitt	March 9, 1971
Julia just might elope with Steve.
85	25	"The Gender Trap"	Coby Ruskin	Ben Gershman	March 16, 1971
Julia becomes a spokesperson for women's liberation.
86	26	"Anyone for Tenants?"	Richard Lang	Robert A. Cinader	March 23, 1971
Julia tries to stop her landlord from turning her apartment building into a swinging bachelor pad.
