= The Doctor's Dilemma =

The Doctor's Dilemma may refer to:

- The Doctor's Dilemma (play), a 1906 work by George Bernard Shaw
- The Doctor's Dilemma (film), a 1958 British film directed by Anthony Asquith based on the play

== Literature ==
- The Doctor's Dilemma, an 1872 novel by Hesba Stretton
- The Doctors' Dilemmas, a 1962 book by Dr. Louis Lasagna

== Television ==
- "A Doctor's Dilemma", The Legend of Zorro episode 32 (1996)
- "Doctor's Dilemma", Holby City series 10, episode 37 (2008)
- "Doctor's Dilemma", Horizon (British) series 5, episode 9 (1968)
- "The Doctor's Dilemma", Julia season 1, episode 29 (1969)
- "The Doctors' Dilemma", Mister Roberts episode 22 (1966)
