= Dick Yarmy =

American actor (1933–1992)

- Born: Richard Paul Yarmy; February 14, 1933; New York City, U.S.
- Died: May 5, 1992 (aged 59); Los Angeles, California, U.S.
- Occupation: Actor
- Years active: 1968–1991
- Spouse: Alice Borden
- Children: 1
- Relatives: Don Adams (brother); Cecily Adams (niece)

Richard Yarmy (February 14, 1933 – May 5, 1992) was an American actor. He appeared in numerous films and television shows throughout the 1960s to the 1990s.

== Biography ==
Yarmy was born in New York in 1933, son of William Yarmy and his wife, Consuelo (née Deiter), who were Jewish and Catholic, respectively. Yarmy was the younger brother of actor and Get Smart star, Don Adams. He also had an elder sister, Gloria Ella Yarmy (later Gloria Burton), a writer who wrote an episode of Get Smart. Dick had served as a corporal, like his brother had in World War II, during the Korean War.

Dick Yarmy graduated from the New York University with a degree in engineering and began his acting career in 1968, appearing in the TV series Get Smart, also That Girl, The Partners, The Partridge Family, and Arnie. He also appeared in several films including Bone, The Kentucky Fried Movie, The Swinging Barmaids, and Carpool among others. Yarmy also appeared in commercials, such as George and Marge for Union Oil.

== Personal life ==
Dick Yarmy was married to actress Alice Borden and together they had one daughter.

== Death ==
Yarmy died of lung cancer in Studio City, Los Angeles on May 5, 1992, aged 59. He was buried in Los Angeles National Cemetery. A group of comedians called "Yarmy's Army" formed to support him in his final illness, and continues after his death doing benefit concerts to help fellow comedians in need.

== Selected filmography ==
=== Film ===
- Bone (1972) - Bank Teller
- The Take (1974) - Roclair
- The Swinging Barmaids (1975) - Comic
- Brothers (1977) - District Attorney Wayne
- The Kentucky Fried Movie (1977) - Taylor (segment "Courtroom")
- Rabbit Test (1978) - Ist Presidential Aide
- The One Man Jury (1978) - Hooker's Costumer
- Racquet (1979) - Cab Driver
- Pray TV (1982) - Dr. Ben Gay
- Movers & Shakers (1985) - Other Executive #3

=== Television ===
- Get Smart (1968-1970) - Brady
- That Girl (1970-1971) - Fred Thompson
- The Partners (1971) - Andy
- The Partridge Family (1971) - Patterson
- Arnie (1971) - Attendant
- The Don Rickles Show (1972) - Carl
- Me and the Chimp (1972) - Dr. Oldham
- The New Dick Van Dyke Show (1973) - Policeman
- McMillan & Wife (1973) - O'Hara
- Love, American Style (1972-1973) - Marty
- Police Story (1974) - Cab Driver
- It Couldn't Happen to a Nicer Guy (1974) - Wineberger
- Emergency! (1973-1975) - Firefighter Joe Bailey
- The Bureau (1976) - Prentiss
- Holmes & Yoyo (1976) - Dr. Yates
- Duffy (1977) - Postman
- A Guide for the Married Woman (1978) - Harry
- Quincy, M.E. (1979) - 2nd Executive
- Friends (1979) - Cabbie
- Laverne & Shirley (1979) - Ludwig Stenger
- B. J. and the Bear (1979) - Uncredited
- Tenspeed and Brown Shoe (1980) - Brandowyn
- Mork & Mindy (1978-1980) - Sid/Ron
- Taxi (1980) - Spencer
- Foul Play (1981) - Professor Himmel
- Bosom Buddies (1982) - Mr. Silverman
- Happy Days (1983) - Holstein
- E/R (1984) - Burton Summers
- Down to Earth (1985) - Mr. Teaberry
- The Jeffersons (1985) - Phil
- Amazing Stories (1985) - VCR
- You Again? (1986) - Mr. Rosen
- The Wizard (1986) - Uncredited
- They Came from Outer Space (1991) - Dr. Milshick (final appearance)
