= Ferdinand Leon =

African-American writer

Ferdinand Leon Jr. (January 29, 1922 – September 7, 1988) was an African-American writer who wrote for television shows.

== Life and career ==
Leon was born in January 1922 in New Orleans, Louisiana, to Ferdinand Leon Sr. and Ida Leon. He attended school in Louisiana with his four sisters. During his youth, Ferdinand lived in New Orleans and Los Angeles, California.

Upon attending African-American writing classes conducted by Earl Barret and Bob Goodwin, Leon was recognized as a "promising student" and gained enough recognition to be hired as a freelance writer.

Leon wrote for television shows in the 1960s and 1970s, including storylines, screenplays, and teleplays. Among his most noted work was writing for the groundbreaking television show Julia. He was one of multiple African-American writers for the show alongside Robert Goodwin, Harry Dolan, and Gene Boland. For Julia, Leon wrote eight episodes between 1968 and 1970, one of which was a teleplay. These episodes included "Gone with the Whim" (1970), "The Prisoner of Brenda" (1970), "Love is a Many Slighted Thing" (1969), "I Thought I Saw a Two Timer "(1969), "Sticks and Stones Can Break My Pizza" (1969), "The One and Only, Genuine, Original, Family Uncle" (1968), and "Designers Don't Always Have Designs" (1968). Leon is mentioned in the autobiography of Hal Kanter (producer for Julia) as a great writer.

Leon wrote for two other shows in his television career, including contributing one episode to Love, American Style in 1970, entitled "Love and the Safely Married Man/Love and the Uncoupled Coupled Couple/Love and the Many Married Couple". He also contributed one episode to The Partners in 1971: "How Many Carats in a Grapefruit".

Leon contributed to the journal Modern Drama Vol. 2 (1968): 87–96 with a piece entitled, "Time, Fantasy, and Reality in Night of the Iguana". It was published as a review of The Night of the Iguana, a screenplay by Tennessee Williams.

Leon died in New Orleans in September 1988 at the age of 66.
