= Rupert Crosse =

American television and film actor

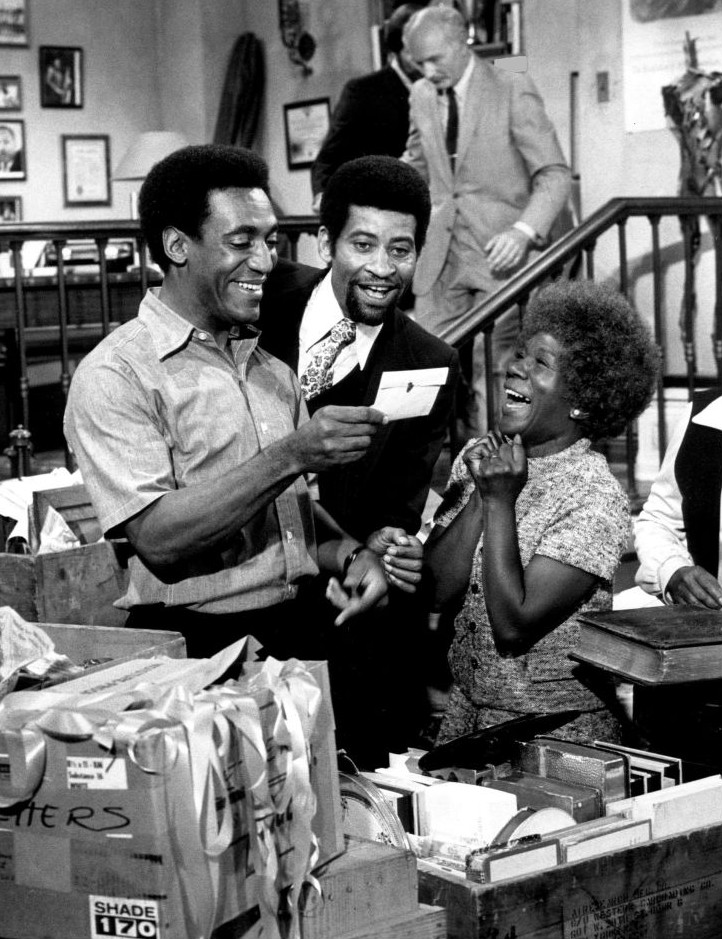
- Crosse (center) with Bill Cosby and Beah Richards on The Bill Cosby Show, 1970
- Born: Robert A. Crosse, Jr. November 29, 1927; New York City, U.S.
- Died: March 5, 1973 (aged 45); Nevis, British West Indies
- Education: Bloomfield College
- Occupation: Actor
- Years active: 1959–1972
- Spouse: Chris Calloway (m. 1970–1973)
- Children: 1
- Relatives: Cab Calloway (father-in-law)

Rupert Crosse (November 29, 1927 – March 5, 1973) was an American television and film actor noted as the first African American to receive a nomination for a Best Supporting Actor Academy Award — for his role in the 1969 adaptation of William Faulkner's The Reivers.

== Early life ==
Born Robert A. Crosse, Jr. in New York City, Crosse was raised by his grandparents in Nevis after the death of his father. He returned to the United States to serve in the U.S. Army for two years and then enrolled in Bloomfield College. Crosse later worked at Brooklyn College as a counselor.

== Career ==
After studying acting under John Cassavetes, Crosse appeared in two of Cassavetes' films: Shadows (for which he won a Venice Film Festival Award) and Too Late Blues (1962).

A life member of The Actors Studio, Crosse made numerous guest appearances on television in the decade and then landed the role of Ned McCaslin in the 1969 film The Reivers, directed by and starring fellow Studio members Mark Rydell and Steve McQueen, respectively. His last onscreen role was in the sitcom The Partners, with Don Adams. Shortly before his death, Crosse was cast as Mulhall in The Last Detail (1973), withdrawing from the role after learning he suffered from terminal cancer. He was replaced by Otis Young.

== Personal life ==
In 1970, Crosse married singer Chris Calloway, daughter of Cab Calloway. They had one son, Rupert Osaze Dia Crosse, who was nine months old at the time of Crosse's death. Their son died in 2002 from a heart condition caused by drug abuse. Calloway died of breast cancer in August 2008.

== Death ==
Crosse died March 5, 1973 of lung cancer in Nevis, West Indies.

== Filmography ==
Year	Title	Role	Notes
1959	Shadows	Rupert	
1959	Johnny Staccato	Redtop	Episode: "Collector's Item"
1961	Rawhide	Trooper	S3:E10; "Incident of the Buffalo Soldier"
1961	Have Gun – Will Travel	Aaron Jedediah Gibbs	Episode: "The Hanging of Aaron Gibbs"
1961	Too Late Blues	Baby Jackson	
1962	Sam Benedict	Moffat	Episode: "Nor Practice Make Perfect"
1962	The Lloyd Bridges Show	Butler	Episode: "Gentleman in Blue"
1962	The Dick Powell Show		Episode: "Borderline"
1963	The Alfred Hitchcock Hour	Dr. Paul Mackey	S1:E22; "Diagnosis: Danger"
1963	Twilight of Honor	Jailer's assistant	Uncredited
1963	The Great Adventure	William Still	Episode: "Go Down, Moses"
1963–1964	Ben Casey	George	2 episodes
1964	The Best Man	Reporter	Uncredited
1964	Marnie	Office worker	Uncredited
1964–1966	The Man from U.N.C.L.E.	General Molte Nobuk; Corporal Remy	2 episodes
1965	Wild Seed	Hobo	Alternative title: Fargo
1965	The Wackiest Ship in the Army		Episode: "The Lady and the Luluai"
1966	Dr. Kildare	George Parker	2 episodes
1966	That Girl	Police officer	Episode: "I'll Be Suing You"
1966	Daktari	Kukuia	Episode: "The Test"
1966	Ride in the Whirlwind	Indian Joe	
1966	Run for Your Life	Hotel Clerk	Episode: "The Treasure Seekers"
1966	The Girl from U.N.C.L.E.	Tchelba	Episode: "The Jewels of Topango Affair"
1967	CBS Playhouse	Funeral director	Episode: "The Final War of Olly Winter" by Ronald Ribman
1967	I Spy	Chester	Episode: "Cops and Robbers"
1967	Cowboy in Africa	Jama	Episode: "Incident at Derati Wells"
1967	Waterhole#3	Prince	
1967	The Monkees	Thursday	S2:E8; "Monkees Marooned"
1968	Felony Squad	Ray Hawkins	2 episodes
1969	The Reivers	Ned McCaslin	Nominated: Academy Award for Best Supporting Actor
1970	Bonanza	Davis	Episode: "The Power of Life and Death"
1970	Storefront Lawyers	Johnson	Episode: "The Emancipation of Bessie Gray"
1970	The Bill Cosby Show	Felix E. LeBlanc	Episode: "The Lincoln Letter"
1970	Bracken's World	Freddy Webster, Sr.	Episode: "Will Freddy's Real Father Please Stand Up?"
1971	Confessions of a Top Crime Buster	Detective George Robinson	Television pilot for The Partners
1972	Mission: Impossible		Episode: "Kidnap"
1971–1972	The Partners	Detective George Robinson	20 episodes (final appearance)
