= Inspector Gadget's Field Trip =

1996 television series

- Title card
- Also known as: Field Trip Starring Inspector Gadget
- Genre: Comedy; Educational; Children's
- Created by: Andy Heyward; Brad Kreisberg
- Based on: Inspector Gadget by Bruno Bianchi; Andy Heyward; Jean Chalopin
- Voices of: Don Adams
- Theme music composer: Mike Piccirillo
- Opening theme: "Inspector Gadget's Field Trip"
- Composer: Mike Piccirillo
- Country of origin: United States
- Original language: English
- No. of seasons: 1
- No. of episodes: 26

Production
- Executive producers: Andy Heyward; Brad Kreisberg; Robby London; Michael Maliani
- Running time: 22 minutes
- Production company: DIC Productions, L.P.

Original release
- Network: The History Channel
- Release: November 3, 1996 – January 4, 1998

Related
- Inspector Gadget

Inspector Gadget's Field Trip (onscreen title: Field Trip Starring Inspector Gadget) is an American live-action/animated children's television series that is a spin-off incarnation of Inspector Gadget, produced by DIC Productions, L.P. in 1996. The series originally aired on The History Channel as one of only two DIC shows produced for the channel (Gadget Boy's Adventures in History was the other one and ran concurrently with Field Trip) in the United States.

== Concept ==
The series was an educational travelogue program for children, in which the animated Gadget would show viewers the many different sites in famous places around the world via live-action-clips with historical facts. The theme song is slightly similar to the one in the Gadget Boy series; in fact, Gadget Boy himself made a cameo appearance in one episode.

Gadget was the only main character to appear in this series; others such as Penny, Brain, Chief Quimby (although mentioned by Gadget in some episodes), Capeman, Dr. Claw, M.A.D. Cat and the M.A.D. Agents were absent. Don Adams reprised the role of Gadget in this series. Notably, in allusion to Get Smart, Gadget would frequently quote Maxwell Smart's catchphrases in this series, specifically, "Would you believe....", "Missed by that much.", and "...and loving it."

== Broadcast ==
A total of 26 episodes were aired from 1996 to 1998, where the show continued in reruns on The History Channel until 2000. In 2001, the show began airing reruns in syndication in order to fill respective station's E/I guidelines, and later aired as part of the E/I DIC Kids Network syndicated block from September 2004 until 2006. Comedian Don Adams returns as the voice of Inspector Gadget (this would be his final appearance as that character; he was concurrently voicing the title character of Gadget Boy).

A Spanish-dubbed version aired on Univision's Planeta U block on Saturday mornings as Los Viajes de Inspector Gadget from the block's premiere from April 5, 2008 to May 29, 2010 when it was taken off the lineup. During the opening sequence, an image of the Temple of Saturn in the ancient forum in Rome, Italy, is presented with the label of "Greece."

The show was available to stream on Paramount+ (formerly CBS All Access).

== Episode list ==
No. in series	Title
1	Greece - Birthplace of the Olympics
2	Southwest U.S. - Native America Boston - Pilgrims
3	Italy - St. Mark's Square San Francisco - Golden Gate Bridge
4	Egypt - The Great Pyramid China - Beijing
5	London - Big Ben
6	Florida - St. Augustine Virginia - Revolutionary Virginia
7	Paris - The Eiffel Tower
8	Boston - Revolutionary Boston The Wild West - Both Sides of the Law
9	Italy - Rome and Vatican City
10	Washington, D.C. - Amazing Museums New York City - The New Land
11	New York City - The Big Apple
12	Spain - Madrid The Wild West - A Wild Legacy
13	The Wild West - Gold Rush Southwest U.S. - The American Southwest
14	China - Life as an Emperor Hawaii - The Aloha State
15	Australia - The Land Down Under Hawaii - Ancient Island Culture
16	Hawaii - Volcanoes Italy - The Shadow of Mount Vesuvius
17	Australia - Sydney San Francisco - Alcatraz & Fisherman's Wharf
18	Italy - Go, Go, Gondola Egypt - The Nile River
19	Australia - Aussie Animals Spain - Barcelona & Pamplona
20	Washington, D.C. - The Capital City
21	China - The Great Wall Italy - Palazzos
22	Egypt - The Age of the Pharaohs
23	Greece - Ancient Greek Treasures Los Angeles - Hollywood
24	Australia - The Great Barrier Reef Florida - The Florida Keys
25	Florida - Space Coast USA Washington, D.C. - The History of Flight
26	Paris - The Louvre and Other Museums San Francisco - Cable Cars and More

== Home media ==
In June 1996, DIC appointed Buena Vista Home Video as the home video distributor for the series. Buena Vista, through subsidiary Disney Educational Productions, released various VHS tapes of the series with two episodes on each, which were sold as educational products for places like schools. The company would re-release the series on DVD in 2007, with the episodes varying between each DVD.

Anchor Bay UK released two volumes in 2004 and 2006 for public usage, each containing four episodes. Avenue Entertainment would release two volumes in 2004; these contained two episodes each.
