= The Bill Dana Show =

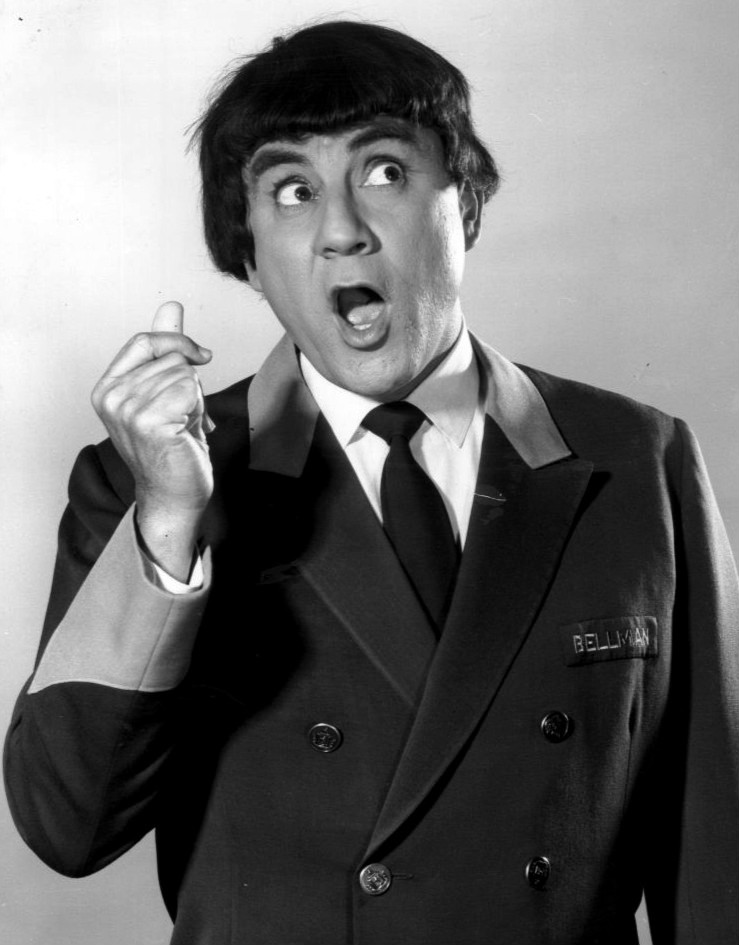
- Dana as José Jiménez, 1964.
- Genre: Comedy
- Created by: Danny Thomas
- Written by: Jack Elinson; Charles Stewart; Garry Marshall; Jerry Belson; Ray Singer; Dick Chevillat; Howard Ostroff
- Directed by: Sheldon Leonard; Coby Ruskin; Danny Thomas; Stanley Z. Cherry; Al Lewis; Theodore J. Flicker; Howard Morris; Jerry Paris; Jay Sandrich
- Starring: Bill Dana; Jonathan Harris; Gary Crosby (1963-'64); Maggie Peterson (1964-'65); Don Adams
- Theme music composer: Earle Hagen
- Opening theme: "Jose's Theme"
- Composer: Irving Szathmary
- Country of origin: United States
- Original language: English
- No. of seasons: 2
- No. of episodes: 42

Production
- Executive producer: Sheldon Leonard
- Producers: Howard Leeds (season 1); Jack Elinson (season 2)
- Production location: Desilu Studios
- Running time: 24 mins.
- Production company: Amigo Productions

Original release
- Network: NBC
- Release: September 22, 1963 – January 17, 1965

Related
- Make Room for Daddy

The Bill Dana Show is an American comedy series starring Bill Dana and Jonathan Harris that aired on NBC from September 22, 1963 to January 17, 1965. The plot follows the daily lifestyle of Latin American José Jiménez, as a bellhop in a New York City hotel.

The series was a spin-off from Make Room for Daddy, which showed the character of José as an elevator operator before he became a bellhop.

== Synopsis ==
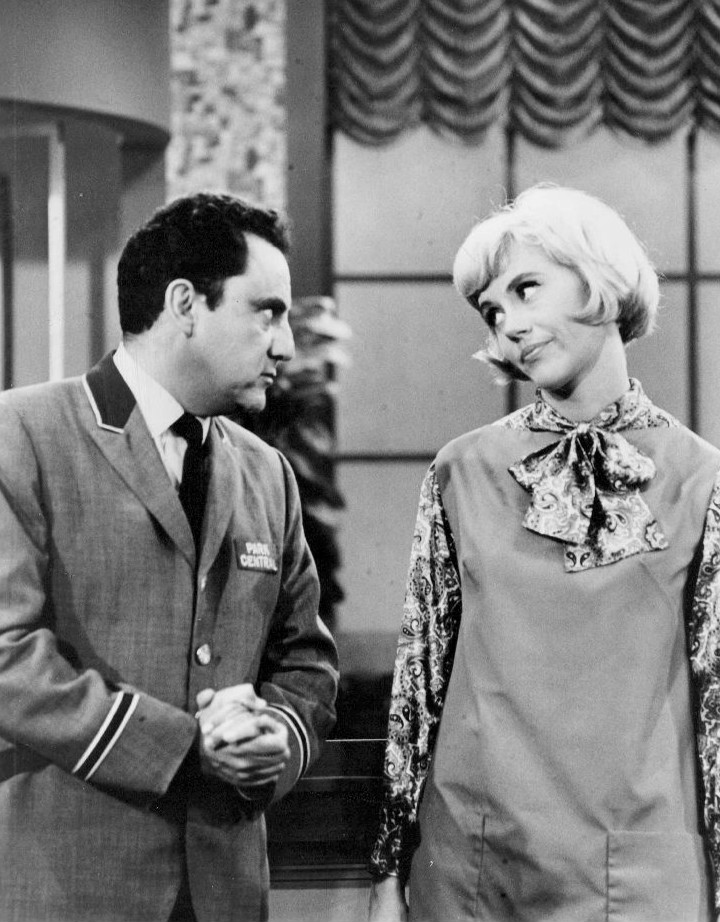
Bill Dana and Maggie Peterson (1964)

The hotel was practically José's entire world; he lived in special bachelor headquarters provided for hotel employees, ate in the hotel kitchen, and had social contact only with employees and guests of the hotel. In his goodhearted naivete, he saw only the good in the people around him. His biggest problems were his fellow bellhop Eddie (Gary Crosby), who was constantly trying to get José to wise up; the less-than-understanding hotel manager Mr. Phillips (Jonathan Harris, who would soon play Dr. Smith on Lost in Space) and the bumbling hotel detective Byron Glick (Don Adams, in a predecessor to the character he would play on Get Smart). In the second season, Maggie Peterson played Susie, a waitress in the hotel's coffee shop.

Walter Mitty-like dream sequences were occasionally used to extricate José from the hotel environment.

Dana did a cameo as José Jiménez on an episode of Batman. He introduces himself to Batman and Robin by saying "My name- José Jiménez". This episode was titled "The Yegg Foes in Gotham" and originally aired on ABC on October 20, 1966. It was the last time Dana played José Jiménez on network television, though he still occasionally performed the role on records and on stage.

Bill Dana was a close friend and collaborator of Don Adams. It was Dana who helped Adams develop his William Powell impression into a character. Dana further brought Adams onto The Bill Dana Show in virtually the same character he would later play on Get Smart. The "Would You Believe" routine, which Dana created, was seen first on Dana's series, though Dana never received credit nor compensation for creating Get Smart with Mel Brooks and Buck Henry, another performer whom Dana brought to television on The Steve Allen Show.

The Disney Channel series The Suite Life of Zack & Cody also featured a haughty hotel manager and a more comical Hispanic bellman.

== Series run ==
The series, sponsored by Procter & Gamble, premiered on September 22, 1963 and ran for a season-and-a-half, before its run ended on January 17, 1965 (the following week, it was replaced by Branded).

== Awards ==
The Bill Dana Show received an Emmy Award nomination for Outstanding Achievement in the Field of Comedy at the 16th Primetime Emmy Awards in 1964.

== Broadcast Distribution ==
| National Broadcasting Company (NBC) (United States, 1963-1965)(TV) | SFM Entertainment (United States, 1989)(syndication, TV) | Weiss Global Enterprises (United States, 1993)(syndication, TV)

== Home Video. ==
| Nu Ventures Video (United States, 1993)(VHS) | Madacy Music Group (Canada, 1993)(30 episodes on 10 tapes., VHS)(Also came in a 10 tape boxed set) | MPI Home Video (United States, 2026)(complete series, DVD)

== Episodes ==
=== Season 1 (1963–64) ===
No. overall	No. in season	Title	Directed by	Written by	Original release date
1	1	"You Got to Have Heart"	Sheldon Leonard	Jack Elinson & Charles Stewart	September 22, 1963
Pilot Episode: Jose demonstrates to his boss Mr. Philips (Jonathan Harris) how important he is to the Hotel by walking out. All the residents miss his thoughtfulness and company and let Mr. Philips know they are unhappy.
2	2	"The Hypnotist"	Sheldon Leonard	Jack Elinson & Charles Stewart	September 29, 1963
A hypnotist is staying at the hotel and witnesses Mr. Philips yelling at Jose and hypnotizes Mr. Philips to be nice and friendly to Jose which totally baffles Jose.
3	3	"Jose, the Playboy"	Sheldon Leonard	Jack Elinson & Charles Stewart	October 6, 1963
Eddie (Crosby) remakes Jose's persona and wardrobe so he can get a date with a debutante. But is she really a debutante?
4	4	"Jose, the Opera Singer"	Jerry Paris	Howard Leeds and Bill Dana	October 13, 1963
Gary Crosby does not appear in this episode.*** Jose takes in an unemployed Opera singer and a stray cat to share his small apartment in the hotel. Hiding them from Mr. Philips is a challenge.
5	5	"Jose, the Stockholder"	Coby Ruskin	Sheldon Keller & Howard Merrill	October 27, 1963
Jose buys one share in the hotel so that he can attend the shareholder's meetings and have influence on the shareholder's votes.
6	6	"The Bank Hold-Up"	Coby Ruskin	Jack Elinson & Charles Stewart	November 3, 1963
Special Guest Star: Don Adams as Detective Glick. Gary Crosby does not appear in this episode.*** A husband and wife ask Jose & Glick to withdraw their money from a bank and give them the withdrawal slip, not knowing that the withdrawal slip is really a bank hold-up note. (Later in the series Don Adams would become a regular)
7	7	"Honeymoon Suite"	Jerry Paris	Ray Singer & Dick Chevillat	November 10, 1963
Jose sneaks some newlyweds into the 'Honeymoon Suite' the same night that Mr. Philips rents out the'Honeymoon Suite' to an influential older couple.
8	8	"Jose, the Agent"	Seymour Robbie	Sam Locke & Joel Rapp	November 17, 1963
Talent Agent Mr. Harris puts Jose in charge of his hotel apartment while he is away scouting talent. A girl singer bursts in to the apartment and mistakes Jose to be Mr. Harris. Eddie convinces Jose to go along with it.
9	9	"The Poker Game"	Unknown	Ray Singer & Dick Chevillat	December 1, 1963
Gary Crosby does not appear in this episode.*** Manager Mr Phillips leaves with his wife for a Miami vacation so Jose rents out Mr. Phillips's room to a little old lady who needs a room for just one night not knowing the little old lady is holding illegal poker games.
10	10	"Mr. Phillips' Watch"	Coby Ruskin	Howard Leeds and Bill Dana	December 8, 1963
Special Guest Star: Don Adams as Detective Glick. Gary Crosby does not appear in this episode.*** Jose and Glick plot to steal Mr. Philip's gold watch and have Glick find it to save his job.
11	11	"Beauty and the Baby"	Unknown	Garry Marshall & Jerry Belson	December 29, 1963
Five New York beauty contestants are staying at the hotel and someone drops off a baby in a basket at Jose's apartment door. A note says the mother is one of the contestants but they must keep it quiet or she will be disqualified.
12	12	"The Brat"	Jerry Paris	Sheldon Keller & Howard Merrill	January 5, 1964
Gary Crosby does not appear in this episode.*** Jose gets assigned the task of baby-sitting a 10-year-old brat who takes pleasure in kicking him in the shins.
13	13	"Jose's Dream Girl"	Coby Ruskin	Howard Leeds	January 12, 1964
Jonathan Harris does not appear in this episode.*** Emily, the girl at the flower shop, has a "crunch" on Eddie the Bellhop. Jose convinces her that Eddie likes her when he doesn't. Jose then decides to turn Emily into the girl that Eddie likes.
14	14	"A Tip for Uncle Sam"	Howard Morris	Jack Elinson & Charles Stewart	January 19, 1964
Jose decides he's so happy with his new country, he'll add a tip to show his appreciation. However, such an unheard of gesture puts the IRS in a state of turmoil, and they beg him to take it back.
15	15	"The Masquerade Party"	Coby Ruskin	Bill Persky & Sam Denoff	January 26, 1964
A Masquerade Benefit is being held at the Hotel and Jose wants to go, but he has to work that night. Eddie has an Idea to get Jose in the Benefit since everyone is wearing masks until midnight, The only costume available is a ladies.
16	16	"Jose's Four Amigos"	Coby Ruskin	Ray Singer & Dick Chevillat	February 2, 1964
José's cousins, The Four Amigos musical quartet, hope to get a gig at the hotel thinking that José is the hotel manager.
17	17	"Eddie Gets Fired"	Coby Ruskin	Fred S. Fox & Iz Elinson	February 9, 1964
Thinking he was in good with the boss Eddie gets fired taking a bum rap for Jose. Eddie and Jose figure out who the culprit is and set a trap.
18	18	"Speak for Yourself, Jose"	Coby Ruskin	Jerry Belson & Garry Marshall	February 16, 1964
Jose's nephew (Mark Goddard) asks Jose to speak on his behalf at a dinner party. Jose, embarrassed by his lack of eloquence asks Eddie then Mr. Phillips to speak instead.
19	19	"Jose, the Manager"	Coby Ruskin	Jack Elinson & Charles Stewart	February 23, 1964
José's little white lie to his blabbermouth aunt about being the hotel manager creates chaos when two hotel financiers from his country visit to propose a business deal with the Park Central.
20	20	"The Party in Suite 15"	Coby Ruskin	Richard Baer	March 1, 1964
Jose has a crush on Sally, the counter girl, and asks her out, it turns out to be the same night Mr. Philips wants Jose to entertain the residents in Suite 15. Sally doesn't believe Jose was ordered to entertain that night and gets angry.
21	21	"Jose, the Matchmaker"	Coby Ruskin	Dick Chevillat & Ray Singer	March 15, 1964
Jose and Eddie plan to help Maggie the hotel maid impress her former boy friend who thinks she owns the Hotel. Mr. Philips and his wife are out for the night and the bellhops decide to use Mr. Philips apartment as Maggie's.
22	22	"Jose's Hot Dog Caper"	Coby Ruskin	Seaman Jacobs & Ed James	March 22, 1964
Special Guest Star: Don Adams as Detective Glick. Gary Crosby is not in this episode.*** Jose & Glick are watching over a suspicious man who turns out to be a police detective. The detective informs them that he is looking for diamond thieves and the bumbling duo conspire to find the diamonds.
23	23	"The Hiring of Jose"	Coby Ruskin	Bill Idelson & Sam Bobrick	April 5, 1964
The "origin story" of José's coming to work at the hotel shows him being confused with a famous south American comedian due in New York. He is given the royal treatment, including a luxury suite, barber and manicurist service and expensive tailoring.
24	24	"The Astronaut"	Coby Ruskin	Irving Elinson & Fred S. Fox	April 12, 1964
Astronaut Colonel Richard Nesbith and his entourage are staying at the hotel, and to impress the son of a guest, Jose says that he's a personal friend of the Astronaut, promising to have him visit the boy's scout pack. Jose has a day dream of being an astronaut himself.
25	25	"Master of Disguise"	Coby Ruskin	Bill Persky & Sam Denoff	April 19, 1964
Special Guest Star: Don Adams as Detective Glick.*** Glick goes undercover donned in different disguises to capture a hotel safe robber. Of coarse bumbling Jose and Glick manage to save the day.
26	26	"Jose Resigns"	Howard Morris	Hannibal Coons & Harry Winkler	April 26, 1964
The final episode with animated opening titles and final episode with Gary Crosby as Eddie the Bellhop.*** Jose's series of goofs seems to place his boss and hotel manager (Johnathan Harris) in jeopardy of a heart attack so Jose' resigns to save his boss' life. But his boss misses Jose because he doesn't have anybody to blame for the mistakes.

=== Season 2 (1964-65) ===
The first 7 episodes of season 2 Bill Dana as Jose Jimenez introduces each episode and guest star. This gets replaced by a "Cold Open" in episode 2.9.

No. overall	No. in season	Title	Directed by	Written by	Original release date
27	1	"Blood from Two Turnips"	Sheldon Leonard	Ray Singer & Dick Chevillat	September 20, 1964
Don Adams is now part of the regular cast in the opening titles, replacing Gary Crosby. and Maggie Peterson has been added to the cast but isn't credited until the end. Opening titles are now live action*** Mr. Phillips requires that all employees donate blood to the Red Cross but two squeamish babies try to get out of it-- Glick and Jiminez.
28	2	"Danny Thomas, I Love You"	Danny Thomas	Garry Marshall & Jerry Belson	September 27, 1964
Don Adams and Maggie Peterson don't appear in this episode*** Guest Star Danny Thomas checks into the Park Central but due to a mix-up, the penthouse is not available until 4pm. Jose comes to the rescue and gives Danny his quarters until then and a sleeping pill which knocks Danny out. Jose then takes pictures of the staff standing next to sleeping Danny.
29	3	"Laughing Gas"	Coby Ruskin	Ray Singer & Dick Chevillat	October 4, 1964
Maggie Peterson doesn't appear in this episode** Hotel security man Glick purchases a room full of old army surplus equipment and accidentally releases nitric oxide into the hotel's air vent.
30	4	"The Essay"	Stanley Z. Cherry	Jack Elinson	October 11, 1964
Don Adams doesn't appear in this episode*** Before he writes an essay on Christopher Columbus for his night-school class, Jose tells Phillips the story of how Columbus got Queen Isabella to finance his historic journey.
31	5	"What Elephant?"	Sheldon Leonard	Bill Dana	October 25, 1964
House detective Glick is quite upset when Phillips orders him to get rid of the bloodhound he "hired." Mr. Phillips then finds out that Jose has cages of rabbits in his room (they keep multiplying). After returning the rabbits Jose ends up bringing an Elephant to his hotel room.
32	6	"Jose on the Ledge"	Stanley Z. Cherry	Garry Marshall & Jerry Belson	November 1, 1964
Don Adams doesn't appear in this episode*** Jose wants to rent the hotel's posh Crystal Room for his cousin's wedding reception but doesn't have the money. Meanwhile a kitten gets stuck on an 11th floor ledge and Jose's want to help outweighs his fear of heights.
33	7	"Jose, the Flower Thief"	Al Lewis	Iz Elinson & Jack Elinson	November 8, 1964
Maggie Peterson doesn't appear in this episode** Jose and house detective Byron Glick catch a little old lady picking flowers in the park. However, a cop catches Jose with the evidence and arrests him. At his trial, Glick acts as his defense attorney.
34	8	"Jose's Inheritance"	Theodore J. Flicker	Martin Ragaway	November 15, 1964
Don Adams doesn't appear in this episode*** Jose receives a letter informing him he's inherited a fortune in Pesos. Remembering how bad Phillips treats him, Jose turns the tables on Phillips, taking the hotel's presidential suite, and with the help of the owner's son, makes Phillips do demeaning tasks like empty ashtrays.
35	9	"The Suggestion Box"	Howard Morris	Carl Kleinschmitt & Dale McRaven	November 22, 1964
Every birthday, Jose throws a "surprise party" for himself - but this year Mr. Phililips won't give Jose the night off because the staff's planning one that Jose doesn't know about. Not knowing this Jose puts some hurtful suggestions in the suggestion box.
36	10	"We'll Get You for This"	Theodore J. Flicker	Ray Singer & Dick Chevillat	December 6, 1964
Maggie Peterson doesn't appear in this episode** Jose becomes mixed up with a pair of tough jewel thieves who claim they are Jewelry Salesmen. Jose accidentally opens their briefcase and the stolen jewels fall out. Jose recognizes the jewels and the gang locks Jose in the closet. Glick joins Jose. After the gang escapes from Jail they come after Jose & Glick.
37	11	"Phillips, the Lover"	Theodore J. Flicker	Howard Ostroff	December 13, 1964
Don Adams and Maggie Peterson don't appear in this episode*** After joining a correspondence club to find a mail-order sweetheart, Jose seeks the help of Mr. Phillips to ghost-write his love letters.
38	12	"Tonsils for Two"	Jerry Paris	Ray Singer & Dick Chevillat	December 20, 1964
While trying to convince Mr. Philips nephew little Johnny to let his doctor examine him, Jose is told by the doctor that his tonsils have to come out. But Jose is too afraid and he consults Susie and Glick.
39	13	"Glick, the Strongman"	Jerry Paris	Martin Ragaway	December 27, 1964
Detective Glick finds that the karate he has been studying doesn't work well when a couple of troublesome wrestlers prove to be a disturbance at the hotel. But Jose's connections with gangsters may be of help.
40	14	"Beauty and the Bellhop"	Jay Sandrich	Bob O'Brien	January 3, 1965
Don Adams and Maggie Peterson don't appear in this episode*** Movie star Yvette Reney is staying at the Hotel and Jose is her 'most devoted fan'. Her visa is about to expire and she will have to leave the country unless she marries an American. She needs to find someone naive enough to do this.
41	15	"Jose, the Old Man"	Jerry Paris	R.S. Allen & Harvey Bullock	January 10, 1965
Don Adams and Maggie Peterson don't appear in this episode*** Uncle Pedro comes to visit Jose. While Jose is overworking putting mattresses away, Uncle Pedro takes Jose's mandatory physical exam. The hotel now thinks Jose has prematurely aged and needs to rest.
42	16	"The Court Jester"	Jay Sandrich	Howard Ostroff	January 17, 1965
LAST SHOW OF THE SERIES***Don Adams and Maggie Peterson don't appear in this episode*** José accepts a job as an aid to a group of businessmen, until he learns that his sole purpose will be to keep them amused.

== See also ==
- 16th Primetime Emmy Awards
