= Don Adams' Screen Test =

American game show

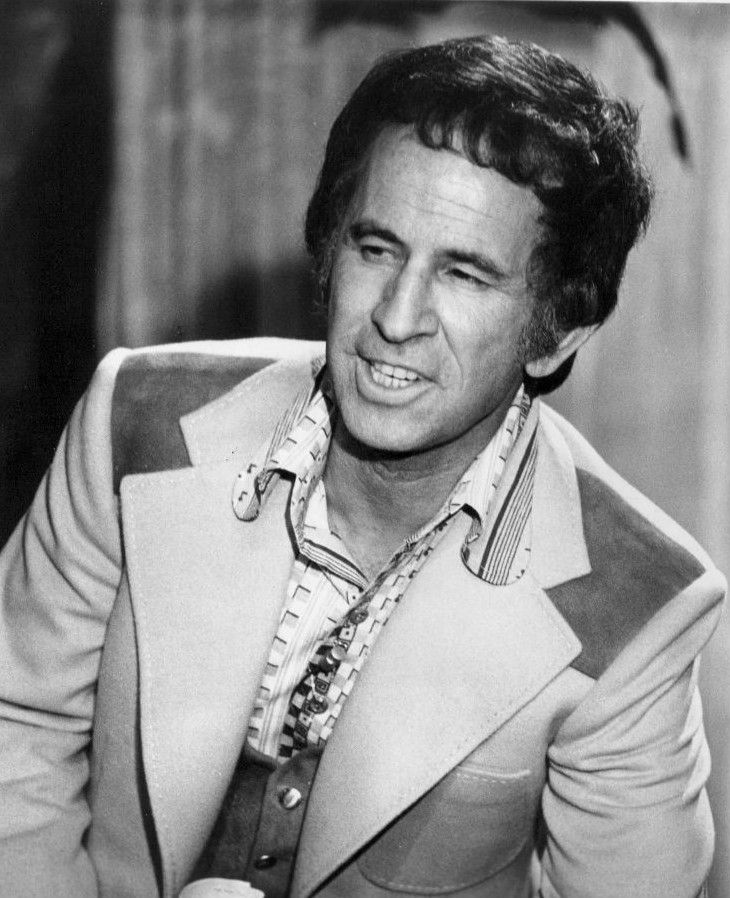
- Adams as the show's host
- Created by: Don Adams
- Presented by: Don Adams
- Narrated by: Charlie O'Donnell
- Country of origin: United States
- No. of episodes: 24 (+1 pilot)

Production
- Running time: 24 mins.
- Production company: Stacey Productions

Original release
- Network: Syndicated
- Release: September 7, 1975 – September 19, 1976

Don Adams' Screen Test is an American game show that aired in syndication for one season. It was hosted by actor Don Adams and the announcer was Charlie O'Donnell.

== Gameplay ==
The game involves two 15-minute periods, in which a contestant would be asked to act out or re-enact a famous Hollywood movie scene (such as the race scene from the 1964 movie Viva Las Vegas). They would then be helped out by Adams and guest celebrities who appeared on the show. Usually, Adams would direct; however, on occasion, he would act along with the contestant and the guest celebrity, and another celebrity would direct. Blunders such as forgotten lines, failures of props, and celebrities ad-libbing would provide additional comedy.

A second contestant would do the same. At the end, both contestants would see their screen tests, and the contestant whose screen test was judged to be better by a well-known director (different for each episode) was declared the winner and given a walk-on part on an upcoming movie or television show.

== Episode status ==
The series is held in its entirety (including the hour-long pilot taped May 16, 1975) by Universal Television but has not been seen since its original airing.
