= Gadget Boy & Heather =

Animated television show

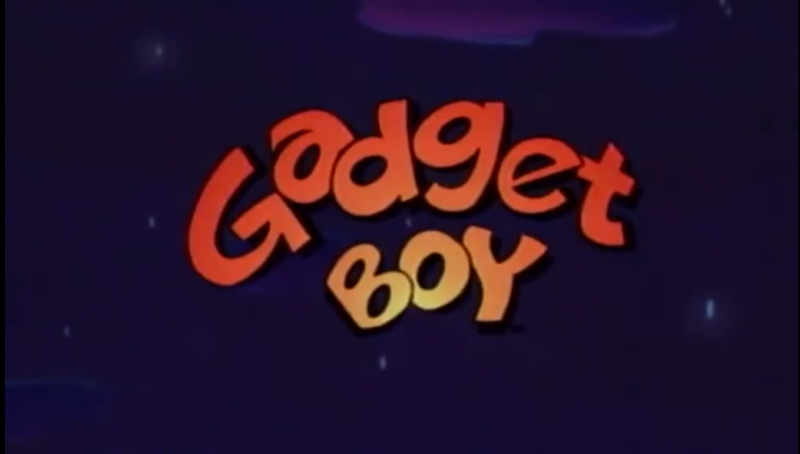
- Also known as: Gadget Boy (season 1); Gadget Boy's Adventures in History (season 2); Gadget Boy: Détective à Travers le Temps (Season 2, French)
- Genre: Superhero; Comedy
- Based on: Inspector Gadget by Bruno Bianchi; Andy Heyward; Jean Chalopin
- Developed by: Phil Harnage; Eleanor Burian-Mohr (season 2)
- Directed by: Pascal Morelli; Charlie Sansonetti
- Voices of: Don Adams; Tara Charendoff; Louise Vallance; Maurice LaMarche
- Theme music composer: Mike Piccirillo
- Composers: Mike Piccirillo; Jean-Michel Guirao
- Countries of origin: France; United States
- Original languages: French; English
- No. of seasons: 2
- No. of episodes: 52

Production
- Executive producers: Andy Heyward; Christian Davin; Robby London; Mike Maliani
- Producers: Pascal Morelli; Charlie Sansonetti
- Running time: 30 minutes
- Production companies: DIC Productions, L.P. France Animation

Original release
- Network: Syndication (United States, Season 1); The History Channel (United States, Season 2); M6 (France)
- Release: September 9, 1995 – March 7, 1998

Gadget Boy & Heather, or simply Gadget Boy, is an animated television series co-produced by DIC Productions, L.P., France Animation, and M6. The series is a spin-off of Inspector Gadget and follows the adventures of a bionic kid detective as he saves the world from the evil Spydra, with assistance from his robotic dog G-9 and the wise Agent Heather. As with Gadget, Don Adams provides the voice of the titular character.

The series debuted in the United States on September 9, 1995, airing on Syndicated television stations as part of Bohbot Entertainment's Amazin' Adventures II block. Its French debut occurred on October 25 on M6's M6 Kid children's strand. The show's second season reformatted the show as an edutainment series entitled Gadget Boy's Adventures in History, airing in the United States on The History Channel from 1997 until 1998, while remaining on M6 in France. It was the last piece of Inspector Gadget material in which Don Adams voiced the character in any form before his retirement in 1999 and eventual death in 2005.

== Synopsis ==
This series is about "Gadget Boy", a bionic kid detective with a personality similar to that of Inspector Gadget. Just as clumsy as the original Inspector Gadget, Gadget Boy was usually bailed out of situations by the more practical Heather, though he was also helped greatly by his myriad high-tech gadgets and extendable arms and legs.

Gadget Boy's bionic implants were installed by Switzerland-based inventor Myron Dabble (voiced by Maurice LaMarche), who has an unrequited crush on Heather. Gadget Boy and Heather receive their assignments from Italy-based Chief Stromboli (also voiced by LaMarche), who, much like Chief Quimby, is a frequent, long-suffering victim of Gadget Boy's bungling. Gadget Boy is assisted by the beautiful and resourceful agent Heather (voiced by Tara Strong), a very tall equivalent of sorts to Penny (the difference being that Heather is in her early 20s). He is also assisted by a robotic dog named G-9 (also LaMarche), who serves as the "Brain" of this series, which shows through his morphing capabilities to get the gang out of the stickiest situations.

The main villain of this series, instead of Dr. Claw, is the mask-wearing six-armed villainess Spydra (voiced by Louise Vallance). Spydra is accompanied by Boris, a frequently abused, wisecracking, sarcastic vulture with a Russian accent, along with her twin henchmen Mulch and Houmous; they are all played by Maurice LaMarche.

The main title theme song was written and performed by Mike Piccirillo. Musical underscore composers were Mike Piccirillo and Jean-Michel Guirao.

== Characters ==
=== Heroes ===
- Gadget Boy (voiced by Don Adams, later Maurice LaMarche in English; Luq Hamet and later Élie Semoun in French) is a bionic police detective working for Interpol in New York City. Equipped by his dog, G-9, and assisted by Heather, he was conceived as a bionic "child" with the personality of a "perfect adult detective" (although as with the aforementioned Inspector Gadget, he is anything but). Much like Inspector Gadget, Gadget Boy is equipped with gadgets in his body while he is clumsy as Gadget but will use the gadgets to get out of sticky situations. The bionic implants were installed by the inventor Myron Dabble. Agent Heather bails Gadget Boy out of danger, though he was also helped greatly by his myriad high-tech gadgets and extendable arms and legs. However, Gadget Boy is usually seen with Heather and G-9, unlike Gadget, who in the original series, will usually inform Penny and Brain once he receives his assignment that the mission is too dangerous and that he will be going on the mission alone, and usually be convinced that a disguised Brain is a M.A.D. agent. Gadget Boy and G-9 appear to switch between being fully robotic to being half-robotic in different episodes. In "Gadget Boy and the Uncommon Cold", it is revealed that Gadget Boy is half-robot and thus catches a cold while G-9 does not. However, in "Boy Power of Babble", Gadget Boy is unaffected by the "babblizer ray" because he is half robot with a mechanical brain, whereas G-9 is completely robotic. As the original voice of Inspector Gadget, Adams voices Gadget Boy in a similar manner. Gadget Boy commonly says "Sowsers! Bowsers!", similar to Inspector Gadget's catchphrase, "Wowsers!"
- Agent Heather (voiced by Tara Charendoff in English and Catherine Privat in French) is an Interpol agent and aide to Gadget Boy. Heather has a slim build with short auburn hair and blue eyes and wears a green jacket, white shirt, blue jeans and dark teal ballet shoes. She is a more resourceful agent and is the equivalent of Penny from Inspector Gadget, except Heather is much taller than Penny and appears to be in her early 20s. Her name is Estelle in the French version, and it is revealed in "Gadget Boy and the Wee Folk" that her bloodline is Irish.
- G-9 (voiced by Maurice LaMarche) is Gadget Boy's robotic dog, similar to Brain. He can morph into anything and assists Gadget Boy to get him and his gang out of the stickiest situations. Gadget Boy and G-9 appear to switch between being fully robotic to being half robotic in different episodes. Although G-9 is a robot dog, in "Boy Power of Babble", G-9 is revealed to be half robot when he is affected by the "babblizer ray", enabling him the ability to speak in an old English, intelligent accent. Unlike Brain, G-9 is usually seen with Gadget Boy, and Gadget Boy does not mistake him for being an enemy agent, as opposed to when the original Inspector Gadget will usually, on the case, mistake Brain appearing incognito for being a M.A.D. agent.
- Chief Drake Stromboli (voiced LaMarche) is the chief of Interpol with an Italian accent. Stromboli has white hair and a white mustache and gives Gadget Boy and Heather their assignments. Like Chief Quimby, Stromboli is a frequent, long-suffering victim of Gadget Boy's bungling. Assignments are printed on a long sheet of paper, often coming out of his tie, compared to the self-destructing paper on which Inspector Gadget will receive his messages, and don't blow up in his face.
- Myron Dabble (voiced by LaMarche) is a bespectacled inventor working for Interpol. He is the man who, like von Slickstein, equipped Gadget Boy with his gadgets. Myron has an unrequited crush on Heather. In "Back to the Vulture", it is revealed that he was really born in Cleveland and speaks with a Swiss accent because he moved to Switzerland in his youth.

=== Villains ===
- Spydra (voiced by Louise Vallance in English and Monique Thierry in French) is the series' primary antagonist. Spydra wears a pink mask and has six arms, speaks in a loud voice, and is almost the female equivalent of Dr. Claw. Her primary goals are to bring down Gadget Boy and commit various grand crimes. Usually, Spydra is seen in her lair, much like Claw at his computer terminal, either in his castle or on the M.A.D.mobile, but does not run a large scale criminal organization similar to M.A.D. Also, Spydra's whole body can be seen, unlike Claw in the original series, where only his arms are seen and he is hiding behind a chair, and Spydra can get out of her chair. Spydra sports six arms and hides her face under a mask, occasionally removing it to use one of her main powers: the ability to petrify anyone who sees her real face. However, the unmasking is always offscreen or is obscured. Her pet is a vulture named Boris, whom she is usually abusive towards, often using alliterations to insult Boris. Spydra's minions are twin brothers Mulch and Hummus, the only recurring minions in the series, as opposed to the different recurring unnamed M.A.D. agents in Inspector Gadget (and sometimes a supervillain who will have a name and appear once, which is less apparent in the second season of the series). Her name is Arachna in the French version.
- Boris (voiced by LaMarche) is Spydra's pet talking vulture. A long-suffering victim of Spydra's verbal abuse, Boris speaks in a Russian accent. He differs from M.A.D. Cat in that M.A.D. Cat is a foil to Claw, in which he will either be petted or pounded on, whereas Boris is only abused in many ways by Spydra, such as being insulted, thrown, or, in extreme cases, petrified by Spydra. He tends to remind Spydra he has a desk job and likes food.
- Mulch and Hummus (both voiced by LaMarche) are twin brothers and Spydra's criminal henchmen, often sent to do her dirty work. The design of Mulch and Hummus is somewhat like the recurring M.A.D. agents from the original Inspector Gadget series; however, Mulch and Hummus are the only henchmen to Spydra, as opposed to a large number of M.A.D. agents working for Dr. Claw. The running gag is she can't tell them apart (Boris says Hummus is the one with the big nose).

== Episodes ==
Season	Episodes	Originally released	
Season	Episodes	First released	Last released
1	26	September 9, 1995	March 16, 1996
2	26	September 6, 1997	March 7, 1998

=== Season 1 (1995–1996) ===
1. Raiders of the Lost Mummies (9 September 1995): written by Christian Darcy, Jeffrey Scott, Jack Hanrahan, and Eleanor Burian-Mohr
2. From Russia with Gadget Boy (16 September 1995): written by Christian Darcy, Jack Hanrahan, and Eleanor Burian-Mohr
3. Don't Burst my Bubble (23 September 1995): written by Christian Darcy, Steve Pesce, and Eleanor Burian-Mohr
4. Gadget Boy in Toyland (30 September 1995): written by Christian Darcy, Steve Pesce, and Eleanor Burian-Mohr
5. Gadget Boy and the Wee Folk (7 October 1995): written by Christian Darcy, Jack Hanrahan, and Eleanor Burian-Mohr
6. You Oughta Be in Paintings (14 October 1995): written by Christian Darcy, Steve Pesce, and Eleanor Burian-Mohr
7. All That Gadgets Is Not Glitter (21 October 1995): written by Christian Darcy and Pat Allee
8. Gadget Boy and the Great Race (28 October 1995): written by Christian Darcy and Aubrey Tadman
9. Gadget Boy and the Ship of Fools (4 November 1995): written by Christian Darcy and Kevin Donahue
10. Gadget Boy and the Uncommon Cold (11 November 1995): written by Christian Darcy and Kevin Donahue
11. Double Double Toil and Dabble (18 November 1995): written by Christian Darcy, Jack Hanrahan, and Eleanor Burian-Mohr
12. Gadget Boy Squadron (25 November 1995): written by Christian Darcy and Kevin Donahue
13. My Gadget Guard (2 December 1995): written by Christian Darcy, Steve Pesce, and Eleanor Burian-Mohr
14. Treasure of the Sierra Gadget (9 December 1995): written by Christian Darcy, Jack Hanrahan, and Eleanor Burian-Mohr
15. Gadget Boy and the Dumpling Gang (16 December 1995): written by Christian Darcy, Jack Hanrahan, and Eleanor Burian-Mohr
16. The Day the Gadget Boy Stood Still (6 January 1996): written by Christian Darcy, Steve Pesce, and Eleanor Burian-Mohr
17. Monumental Mayhem (13 January 1996): written by Christian Darcy, Jack Hanrahan, and Eleanor Burian-Mohr
18. Jurassic Spydra (20 January 1996): written by Christian Darcy, Jack Hanrahan, and Eleanor Burian-Mohr
19. Gadget Boy's Tiniest Adventure (27 January 1996): written by Christian Darcy, Jack Hanrahan, and Eleanor Burian-Mohr
20. Power of Babble (3 February 1996): written by Christian Darcy and Terence Taylor
21. Pirate of the Airwaves (10 February 1996): written by Christian Darcy, Steve Pesce, and Eleanor Burian-Mohr
22. Jaws and Teeth Too (17 February 1996): written by Christian Darcy and Jean Chalopin
23. Eight Hands are Quicker Than Gadget Boy (24 February 1996): written by Christian Darcy and Kyle Gaither
24. Boris for President (2 March 1996): written by Christian Darcy, Jack Hanrahan, and Eleanor Burian Mohr
25. All Webbed Up, Nowhere to Go (9 March 1996): written by Christian Darcy, Jack Hanrahan, and Eleanor Burian-Mohr
26. Vulture of the Bride (16 March 1996): written by Christian Darcy, Jack Hanrahan, and Eleanor Burian-Mohr

=== Season 2 (1997–1998) ===
1. The Vulture Has Landed (Neil Armstrong, 1969, Moon ) (6 September 1997): written by Steve Pesce and Eleanor Burian-Mohr
2. The Long and Winding Wall (The Dragon King, China, 211 BC) (13 September 1997): written by Jack Hanrahan and Eleanor Burian-Mohr
3. For Whom the Torch Rolls (Zeus, 400 BC, Olympia, Greece) (20 September 1997): written by Christian Darcy, Jack Hanrahan, Eleanor Burian-Mohr, and Louis Gassin
4. Madame Spydra Fly (Matthew C. Perry, 1853, Japan) (27 September 1997): written by Jack Hanrahan and Eleanor Burian-Mohr
5. An Ice Age Runs Through It (Somewhere in 70,000,000 BC) (4 October 1997): written by Steve Pesce and Eleanor Burian-Mohr
6. The Three Gadgeteers (The Three Musketeers, 1617, Paris, France) (11 October 1997): written by Christian Darcy, Steve Pesce, Eleanor Burian-Mohr, and Louis Gassin
7. Hot Time in Old Caves (Ned The Neanderthal, 750,000 BC, Southern France) (18 October 1997): written by Kevin Donahue
8. Bionic Blunder from Down Under (James Cook, 1770, Australia) (25 October 1997): written by Steve Pesce and Eleanor Burian-Mohr
9. Some Assembly Required (Henry Ford, 1909, Detroit, Michigan) (1 November 1997): written by Steve Pesce, Jack Hanrahan, and Eleanor Burian-Mohr
10. Gadget-Stein (Mary Shelley, 1816, Geneva, Switzerland) (8 November 1997): written by Steve Pesce and Eleanor Burian-Mohr
11. Ice Station Vulture (Robert Peary, 1909, North Pole) (15 November 1997): written by Christian Darcy, Steve Pesce, Eleanor Burian-Mohr, and Louis Gassin
12. Coming In on a Web and Prayer (The Wright Brothers, 1903, Kitty Hawk, North Carolina) (22 November 1997): written by Christian Darcy, Steve Pesce, Eleanor Burian-Mohr, and Louis Gassin
13. All's Fair at the World Fair (Inventors, 1939, Queens, New York) (29 November 1997): written by Steve Pesce and Eleanor Burian-Mohr
14. A Whale of a Sail of a Tail (Sinbad The Sailor, 1300 BC, Phoenicia) (6 December 1997): written by Christian Darcy, Jack Hanrahan, Eleanor Burian-Mohr, and Louis Gassin
15. An Extinct Possibility (Explorers, 1955, Africa) (13 December 1997): written by Steve Pesce and Eleanor Burian-Mohr
16. A Knight to Remember (Henry III of England, 1216, England) (20 December 1997): written by Steve Pesce and Eleanor Burian-Mohr
17. No Laughing Matter (Charlie Chaplin, 1920, Hollywood, California) (3 January 1998): written by Kevin Donahue
18. It's Not Easy Staying Green (Hunters, 1970, Brazil) (10 January 1998): written by Jack Hanrahan, Eleanor Burian-Mohr, and Steve Pesce
19. Just Fakir-ing It (Fakirs, 1928, India) (17 January 1998): written by Jack Hanrahan and Eleanor Burian-Mohr
20. Go West Young Vulture (John Sutter, 1850, California) (24 January 1998): written by Jack Hanrahan and Eleanor Burian-Mohr
21. These Are a Few of My Favorite Flying Things (Leonardo da Vinci, 1470, Florence, Italy) (31 January 1998): written by Steve Pesce and Eleanor Burian-Mohr
22. Valley of the Vulture (King Tut, 1334 BC, Egypt) (7 February 1998): written by Jack Hanrahan and Eleanor Burian-Mohr
23. The Time Land Forgot (Mayan Natives, 700 AD, Mexico) (14 February 1998): written by Christian Darcy, Jack Hanrahan, Eleanor Burian-Mohr, and Louis Gassin
24. Three Brainiacs in a Fountain (Marie Curie, 1902, Paris, France, Louis Pasteur, 1864, Paris France & Albert Einstein, 1932, New York City, New York) (21 February 1998): written by Christian Darcy, Jack Hanrahan, Eleanor Burian-Mohr, and Louis Gassin
25. A Gadget Boy Christmas All Around the World (Turkish bishops, 325 AD Turkey, Italians, Italy - 500 BC & Martin Luther, 1517, Wittenberg, Germany) (28 February 1998): written by Jack Hanrahan and Eleanor Burian-Mohr
26. Back to the Vulture (Mrs. Dabble, 1957, Cleveland, Ohio) (7 March 1998): written by Christian Darcy, Steve Pesce, Eleanor Burian-Mohr, and Louis Gassin

== Development ==
In November 1992, DIC Entertainment announced that they had put several new projects into development, one of which would be a new Inspector Gadget spin-off featuring a female protagonist, entitled Gadget Girl. DIC was engaging in preliminary discussions with a network to officiate the project. Bohbot Entertainment acquired the US broadcast rights to the series in 1994.

At MIP-TV in April 1994, DIC entered into a co-production deal with French television broadcaster M6 in the production of a new animated series. During this process, DIC showcased the original Gadget Girl idea to M6, but rejected the concept. DIC instead reworked the concept into a series featuring a young Inspector Gadget-like baby character, which M6 also rejected. They eventually decided on a six-year-old bionic detective as the main character, and officially announced the series at MIPCOM as Gadget Boy in October. After officiating the deal, France Animation was hired to handle the storyboards and post-production while the animation was outsourced in Asia. In addition to co-owning the IP, DIC and M6 closely shared creative supervision, with the former mainly handling the scripts, and additional help from French scriptwriters. They also shared distribution duties; M6 handled Europe and DIC in all other territories.

Following the show's success in both the US and France, DIC pitched M6 a second season, taking a more educational approach as a "freshening up" of the series. The broadcaster agreed, and work began on Gadget Boy's Adventures in History in January 1996. DIC would team up with the National Education Association to supply educational elements, facts, and values for the series, and would pre-sell the season to The History Channel.

== Broadcast ==
=== United States ===
In the United States, the show's first season aired as part of the Amazin' Adventures II syndicated block, with reruns continuing until 1996. The second season aired on The History Channel.

Reruns of the first season were later shown on Toon Disney between April 19, 1998, and January 5, 2002.

From 2010 to September 2011, the series returned to US television when it aired on This TV's Cookie Jar Toons block.

As of 2022, the series is available to stream on Pluto TV.

=== Internationally ===
In the Philippines, it was aired on IBC from 1996 to 1999 through the Vintage Television block on a weekly basis before moving to GMA Network a year later.

In the United Kingdom, the series aired on BBC One and BBC Two on the CBBC block from 1997 to 2001; between 2002 and 2012 (approximately), it ran during the early hours of the morning on Cartoon Network and Boomerang.

From 1998 to 2000, the series was broadcast in Canada on Family Channel.

== Home media ==
On May 28, 2003, Sterling Entertainment released a DVD/VHS titled "Gadget Boy Saves the World", containing four episodes (three on the VHS) of the series. The DVD was re-released by NCircle Entertainment in 2008 alongside another DVD titled "Along Came A Spydra", which also contained four episodes.

On February 21, 2012, Mill Creek Entertainment released Gadget Boy's Adventures in History - The Complete Series on DVD in Region 1 for the very first time. The 3-disc set featured all 26 episodes from the second season of the series and also contains bonus episodes from Johnny Test, The New Adventures of Nanoboy, World of Quest, Super Duper Sumos and The Wacky World of Tex Avery. Mill Creek also released the first disc as a single DVD release titled "Stopping Evil Across Time" on the same day, containing the same bonus episode of Johnny Test.

== See also ==
- DIC Entertainment
- Inspector Gadget
- Inspector Gadget's Field Trip
- Gadget & the Gadgetinis
