= Julia (1968 TV series) =

American television sitcom (1968–1971)

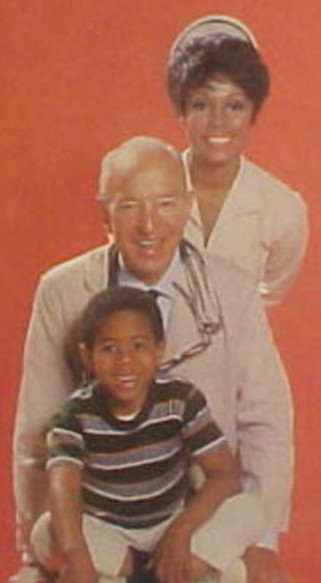
- Diahann Carroll, Lloyd Nolan, and Marc Copage.
- Genre: Sitcom
- Created by: Hal Kanter
- Directed by: Don Ameche; Luther James; Fletcher Markle; Coby Ruskin; Barry Shear; Ezra Stone; Bernard Wiesen; Hollingsworth Morse
- Starring: Diahann Carroll; Lloyd Nolan; Marc Copage; Michael Link; Betty Beaird; Lurene Tuttle
- Theme music composer: Elmer Bernstein
- Composers: Jeff Alexander; Elmer Bernstein
- Country of origin: United States
- Original language: English
- No. of seasons: 3
- No. of episodes: 86 (list of episodes)

Production
- Executive producer: Hal Kanter
- Producer: Hal Kanter
- Camera setup: Single-camera
- Running time: 24 minutes
- Production companies: Hanncarr Productions; Savannah Productions; 20th Century-Fox Television

Original release
- Network: NBC
- Release: September 17, 1968 – March 23, 1971

Julia is an American television sitcom that debuted in 1968. The show starred actress and singer Diahann Carroll in the first American television series to star an African American woman whose character was not a servant or slave in the lead role, and ran for 86 episodes on NBC from September 17, 1968, to March 23, 1971. The series was produced by Savannah Productions, Inc., Hanncarr Productions, Inc., and 20th Century-Fox Television.

During pre-production, the working title was Mama's Man. The series was among the few situation comedies in the late 1960s that did not use a laugh track; however, 20th Century-Fox Television added one when the series was reissued for syndication and cable rebroadcasts in the late 1980s.

Julia was among the first acquisitions made by ASPiRE for its inaugural season in 2012.

== Synopsis ==
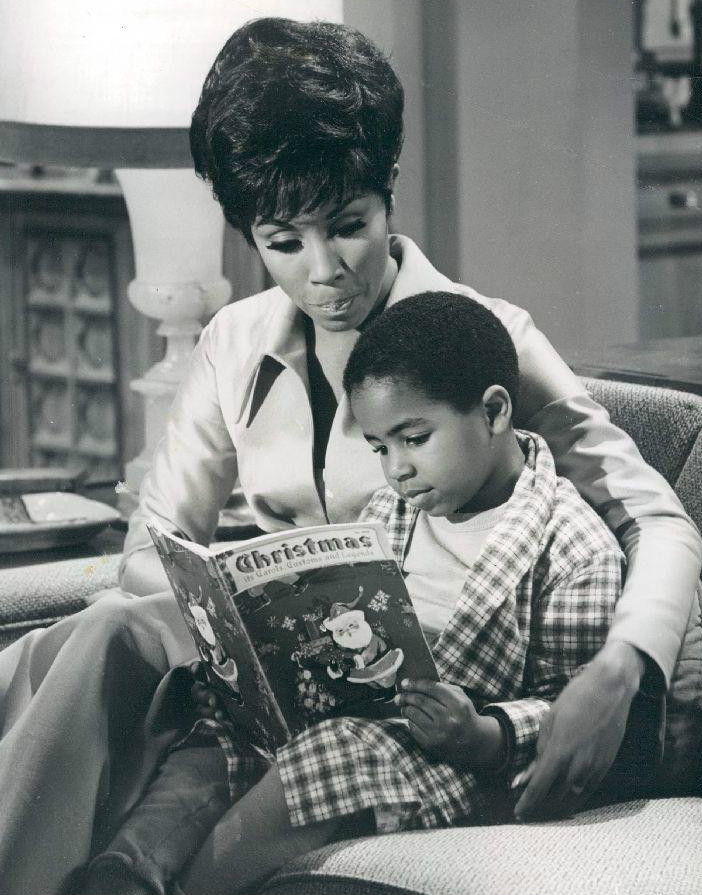
Julia and Corey at home.

In Julia, Carroll played widowed single mother, Julia Baker (her husband, Army Capt. Baker, an O-1 Bird Dog artillery spotter pilot had been shot down in Vietnam), who was a nurse in a doctor's office at a large aerospace company. The doctor, Morton Chegley, was played by Lloyd Nolan, and Julia's romantic interests by Paul Winfield and Fred Williamson. Julia's son, Corey (Marc Copage) was approximately six to nine years old during the series run. He had barely known his father before he died. Corey's best friend was Earl J. Waggedorn, whom Corey almost always addressed and referred to precisely by his full name, though other characters (particularly his mother) would refer to him simply as Earl. The Waggedorns lived downstairs in the same apartment building, with father, police officer Leonard (Hank Brandt), stay-at-home mother Marie (Betty Beaird), and two sons, Earl and an infant whose first name is never revealed.

The first two seasons included nurse Hannah Yarby (Lurene Tuttle), who left to be married at the beginning of the third season, just as the clinic's manager, Brockmeyer, ordered downsizing — and removal of minorities from employment. (Chegley let Yarby go but kept Julia in defiance of the manager's edict. She was also kept after Chegley reminded Brockmeyer that such a move was a violation of the Civil Rights Act, which was just five years old at that point.) The second and third season included Richard (Richard Steele), a boy some one or two years older than Corey. Chegley's uncle, Dr. Norton Chegley (also played by Lloyd Nolan), made three appearances. The series' first episode was filmed in October 1967, a year before the pilot was picked up.

== Cast ==
- Diahann Carroll as Julia Baker
- Marc Copage as Corey Baker
- Betty Beaird as Marie Waggedorn
- Ned Glass as Sol Cooper (17 episodes, 1968–1970)
- Janear Hines as Roberta (1970–71)
- Eugene Jackson as Uncle Lou (1968–69)
- Michael Link as Earl J. Waggedorn
- Don Marshall as Ted Neumann (1968–70)
- Alison Susan Mills as Carol Deering
- Lloyd Nolan as Dr. Morton Chegley
- Mary Wickes as Melba Chegley (Dr. Chegley's wife)
- Steve Pendleton as Mr. Bennett (6 episodes, 1968–1970)
- Eddie Quillan as Eddie Edson (17 episodes, 1968–71)
- Lurene Tuttle as Nurse Hannah Yarby (32 episodes, 1968–70)
- Hank Brandt as Leonard Waggedorn (27 episodes, 1968–71)
- Fred Williamson as Steve Bruce (1970–71)
- Paul Winfield as Paul Cameron
- Diana Sands as Cousin Sarah Porter (1970–1971)

== Controversy ==
Although Julia is remembered today as groundbreaking, during its original run the series was derided by many critics for being apolitical and unrealistic. In 1968, Diahann Carroll remarked: "At the moment we're presenting the white Negro. And he has very little Negroness." The Saturday Review's Robert Lewis Shayon wrote that Julia's "plush, suburban setting" was "a far, far cry from the bitter realities of Negro life in the urban ghetto, the pit of America's explosion potential." Gil Scott-Heron's "The Revolution Will Not Be Televised" refers to Julia in the same breath as Bullwinkle, implying that the character was something of a cartoon. Ebony published a somewhat more supportive assessment of the program: "As a slice of Black America, Julia does not explode on the TV screen with the impact of a ghetto riot. It is not that kind of show. Since the networks have had a rash of shows dealing with the nation's racial problems, the light-hearted Julia provides welcome relief, if, indeed, relief is even acceptable in these troubled times." The series also came under criticism from African-American viewers for its depiction of a fatherless black family due to the father's death in American military service. Excluding a black male lead, it was argued, "rendered the series safer" and "less likely to grapple with issues that might upset white viewers."

== Nielsen ratings ==
| Season | Rank | Rating |
|---|---|---|
| 1) 1968–1969 | #7 | 24.6 |
| 2) 1969–1970 | #28 | 20.1 |
| 3) 1970–1971 | Not in the Top 30 | |

== Cancellation ==
Julia received good ratings the first two seasons but dropped out of the top 30 most-watched shows during season 3. In 1971, the series was canceled, reportedly because of Carroll's and series creator and executive producer Hal Kanter's desire to work on other projects. Kanter created and produced the short-lived The Jimmy Stewart Show for NBC the following season.

== Awards and nominations ==
| Year | Award | Result | Category | Recipient |
|---|---|---|---|---|
| 1969 | American Cinema Editors | Nominated | Best Edited Television Program | John Ehrin (For episode "Mama's Man") |
| 1969 | Emmy Award | Nominated | Outstanding Single Performance by an Actor in a Supporting Role | Ned Glass (For episode "A Little Chicken Soup Never Hurt Anybody") |
| 1969 | Emmy Award | Nominated | Outstanding Continued Performance by an Actress in a Leading Role in a Comedy Series | Diahann Carroll; this nomination made Carroll the first African-American woman to earn an Emmy nomination in this category |
| 1969 | Emmy Award | Nominated | Outstanding Continued Performance by an Actor in a Leading Role in a Comedy Series | Lloyd Nolan |
| 1969 | Emmy Award | Nominated | Outstanding Comedy Series | Hal Kanter |
| 1970 | Emmy Award | Nominated | Outstanding Performance by an Actress in a Supporting Role in Comedy | Lurene Tuttle |
| 1969 | Golden Globe Award | Nominated | Best Television Series | - |
| 1969 | Golden Globe Award | Won | Best TV Star – Female | Diahann Carroll |
| 1970 | Golden Globe Award | Nominated | Best TV Actress – Musical/Comedy | Diahann Carroll |
| 1969 | Photoplay Magazine Medal | Won | Actress of the Year | Diahann Carroll |
| 2003 | TV Land Awards | Won | Groundbreaking Show | Diahann Carroll |
