= Don Adams =

American actor (1923–2005)

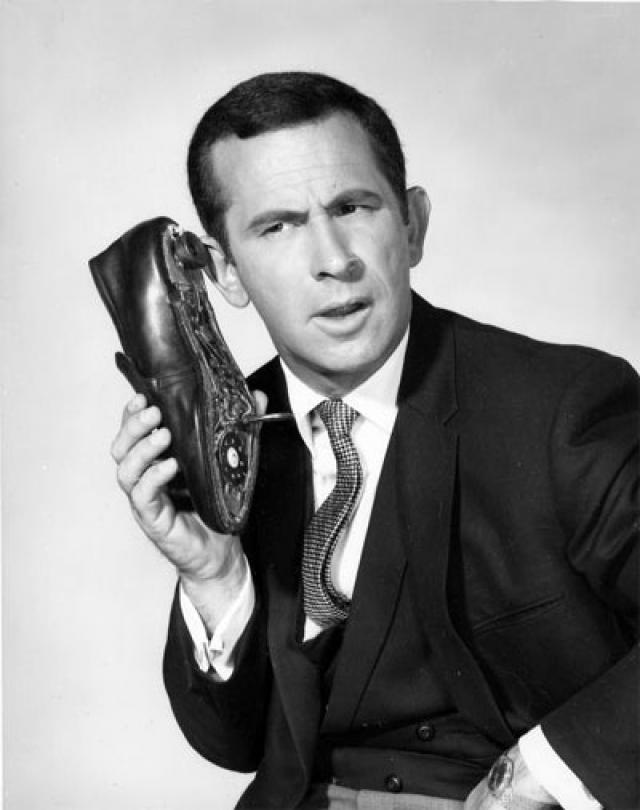
- Adams as Maxwell Smart in Get Smart (1968)
- Born: Donald James Yarmy; April 13, 1923; New York City, New York, U.S.
- Died: September 25, 2005 (aged 82); Los Angeles, California, U.S.
- Resting place: Hollywood Forever Cemetery
- Occupation: Actor
- Years active: 1945–2001
- Notable work: Get Smart, Tennessee Tuxedo and His Tales, Inspector Gadget
- Spouses: Adelaide Efantis (m. 1947; div. 1960) Dorothy Bracken (m. 1960; div. 1976) Judy Luciano (m. 1977; div. 1990)
- Children: 7, including Cecily
- Relatives: Dick Yarmy (brother)
- Military career
- Allegiance: United States
- Branch: United States Marine Corps
- Service years: 1941–1945
- Conflicts: World War II -Battle of Guadalcanal

Donald James Yarmy (April 13, 1923 – September 25, 2005), known professionally as Don Adams, was an American actor. In his five decades on television, he was best known as bumbling Maxwell Smart (Secret Agent 86) in the television situation comedy Get Smart (1965–1970, 1995), which he also sometimes directed and wrote. Adams won three consecutive Emmy Awards for his performance in the series (1967–1969). Adams also provided voices for the animated series Tennessee Tuxedo and His Tales (1963–1966) and Inspector Gadget (1983–1986) as well as several revivals and spinoffs of the latter in the 1990s.

== Early life ==
Adams was born Donald James Yarmy on April 13, 1923, in Manhattan, New York, a son of William Yarmy and his wife, Consuelo (née Deiter) Yarmy. His father was of Hungarian Jewish descent and worked as a restaurant manager; his mother was Irish American. Donald and his brother Dick Yarmy were each raised in the religion of one parent: Don in the Catholic faith of their mother and Dick in the Jewish faith of their father. The brothers had an elder sister, Gloria Ella Yarmy (later Gloria Burton), a writer who wrote an episode of Get Smart. Dropping out of New York City's DeWitt Clinton High School, he worked as a theater usher. He later remarked that he had "little use for school".

=== World War II service ===
Late in 1941, he joined the United States Marine Corps. Yarmy reported to the First Training Battalion in New River, North Carolina, and then was assigned to I Company of the Third Battalion, Eighth Marines in San Diego.

In May 1942, Yarmy's unit was transported to Samoa for further training and then participated in the Battle of Guadalcanal in August 1942 in the Pacific Theater of Operations. Contrary to urban legend, he was not wounded in combat, but did contract blackwater fever, a serious complication of malaria, known for a 90% rate of fatality. Yarmy was evacuated and then hospitalized for more than a year at Silverstream Hospital, a US Navy hospital near Wellington, New Zealand. After his recovery, Yarmy served as a Marine Drill Instructor in the United States, holding the rank of corporal. He was an expert marksman and was noted for his competence.

== Career ==
=== Early career ===
After his discharge in 1945, Yarmy went to Florida and worked as a comic in a strip club, doing impersonations of celebrities, but he refused to do "blue" material and was fired. In 1947, he married Adelaide Constance Efantis (1924–2016), nicknamed "Dell", a singer who performed as Adelaide Adams. He decided to take her name because performers were called up for auditions in alphabetical order. Adams also worked as a commercial artist and restaurant cashier to help support his wife and three daughters.

Adams's work on television began in 1954 when he won on Arthur Godfrey's Talent Scouts with a stand-up comedy act written by boyhood friend Bill Dana. In the late 1950s, he made eleven appearances on The Steve Allen Show, where Dana was part of the writing team. During the 1961–63 television seasons, he was a regular on NBC's The Perry Como Show as part of The Kraft Music Hall Players and frequently on the Jimmy Dean Show. He had a role on the NBC sitcom The Bill Dana Show (1963–65) as a bumbling hotel detective named Byron Glick.

=== Get Smart ===
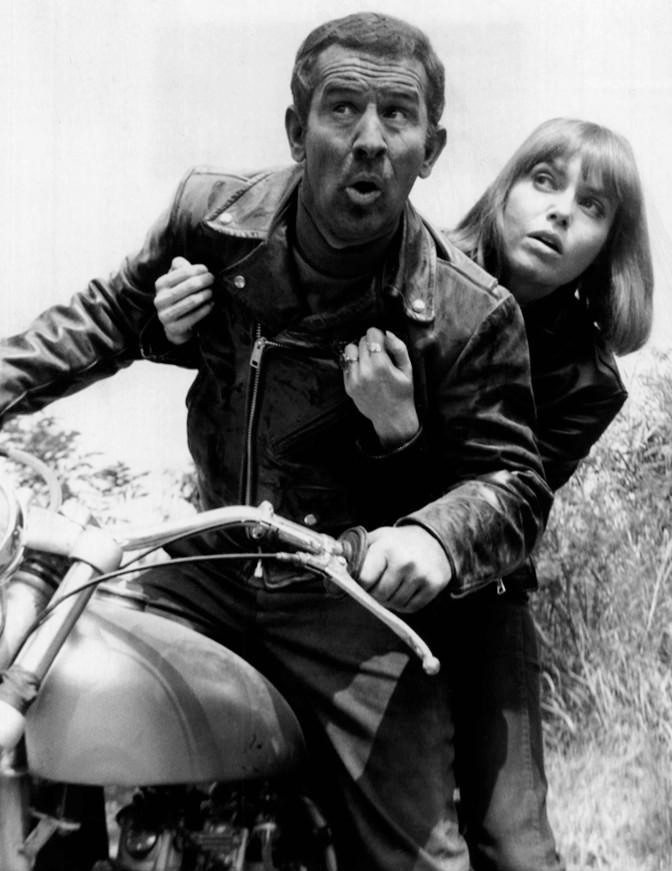
Adams and Barbara Feldon in Get Smart

Creators Mel Brooks and Buck Henry, prompted by producers Daniel Melnick and David Susskind, wrote Get Smart as the comedic answer to the successful 1960s spy television dramas such as The Man from U.N.C.L.E., The Avengers, I Spy and others. They were asked to write a spoof that combined elements from two of the most popular film series at the time: James Bond and The Pink Panther (Inspector Clouseau).

Get Smart was written as a vehicle for Tom Poston, to be piloted on ABC; when ABC turned it down, NBC picked up the show and cast Adams in the role because he was already under contract. When Get Smart debuted in 1965, it was an immediate hit. Barbara Feldon co-starred as Max's young and attractive partner (later wife) Agent 99. They had great chemistry throughout the show's run, despite a 10-year age difference and they became best friends during and after.

Adams gave the character a clipped speaking style borrowed from actor William Powell. Feldon said, "Part of the pop fervor for Agent 86 was because Don did such an extreme portrayal of the character that it made it easy to imitate." Adams created many popular catchphrases (some of which were in his act before the show), including "Sorry about that, Chief", "Would you believe ...?", "Ahh ... the old [noun] in the [noun] trick. That's the [number]th time this [month/week]." (sometimes the description of the trick was simply, "Ahh... the old [noun] trick.") and "Missed it by 'that much'."

Adams also produced and directed 13 episodes of the show. He was nominated for Emmys four seasons in a row, from 1966 to 1969, for Outstanding Continued Performance by an Actor in a Leading Role in a Comedy Series. He won the award three times. The show moved to CBS for its final season, with ratings declining, as spy series went out of fashion. Get Smart was canceled in 1970 after 138 episodes.

=== Typecasting ===
Adams's efforts after Get Smart were less successful, including the comedy series The Partners (1971–72), a game show called Don Adams' Screen Test (1975–76, see below) and two attempts to revive the Get Smart series: Get Smart, Again! in 1989, and Get Smart in 1995. His movie The Nude Bomb (1980) was unsuccessful at the box office. Adams had been typecast as Maxwell Smart and was unable to escape the image, although he had success as the voice of the titular protagonist in the series Inspector Gadget, a character that was heavily inspired by Maxwell Smart.

He earned most of his income from his work on stage and in nightclubs. As Adams had chosen a lower salary in exchange for a one-third ownership stake in Get Smart during the show's production, he received a regular income for many years due to the show's popularity in reruns.

=== Don Adams' Screen Test ===
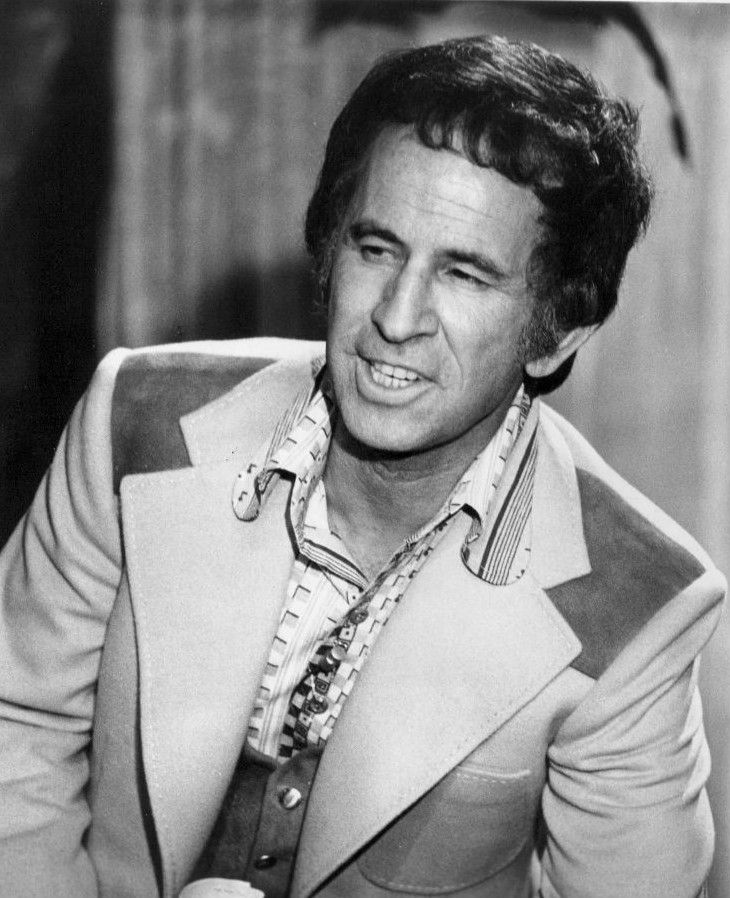
Adams as the host of his short-lived game show Don Adams' Screen Test, 1975

Don Adams' Screen Test was a syndicated game show which lasted 26 episodes during the 1975–76 season. The show was filmed in two 15-minute segments, in each of which a randomly selected audience member would "act" to re-create a scene from a Hollywood movie as accurately as possible.

Such moments as the bar scene from The Lost Weekend, the duel scene from The Prisoner of Zenda or the beach scene from From Here to Eternity were used, with Adams directing and a celebrity guest playing the other lead in the scene. Hokey effects, bad timing, forgotten lines, prop failures and the celebrity's "ad libs" were maximized for comic effect as the audience watched "bloopers" and "outtakes" as they happened. At the end of the program, the final, serious, fully edited version of the "screen test" of each of the two contestants would be played, with audience reaction determining the winner, who would receive a trip to Hollywood and a real screen test for a motion picture.

=== Later work ===
Adams resurrected the Maxwell Smart character for a series of television commercials for Savemart, a retail chain that sold audio and video equipment. He also did a series of audio/radio commercials in the 1980s for Chief Auto Parts, a retail automobile parts establishment later sold to AutoZone.

He also appeared in the film Jimmy the Kid (1982) and played a cameo role as a harbormaster in Back to the Beach (1987).

Adams attempted a situation-comedy comeback in Canada with Check it Out! in 1985. Set in a supermarket, the show ran for three years but in the United States the series found only limited success in syndication. The show also starred Gordon Clapp, an unknown actor at the time, who developed a rapport with Adams.

In 1995, Adams reprised his Maxwell Smart role one last time on Get Smart for Fox; it co-starred Barbara Feldon and rising star Andy Dick as Max and 99's son. Unlike the original version, this show did not appeal to younger viewers and it was canceled after just seven episodes. One of Adams's last public appearances was at the Get Smart Gathering on November 7, 2003, at a North Hollywood restaurant, in which fans of the show joined the cast and some of the creative talent of the series.

Adams was the voice of the title character in Tennessee Tuxedo and His Tales (1963–66), with his bombastic catchphrase "Tennessee Tuxedo will not fail!" Later, he voiced himself in animated form for a guest shot in an episode of Hanna-Barbera's The New Scooby-Doo Movies, titled "The Exterminator". His most notable voiceover work was that of the title character in Inspector Gadget. He voiced the character in the original television series (1983–85) and a 1992 Christmas special, as well as in subsequent 1990s spinoffs Gadget Boy and Inspector Gadget's Field Trip. He retired from voicing Inspector Gadget in 1999.

His last roles were the voices of Brain the Dog in the end credits for the 1999 film version of Inspector Gadget and Principal Hickey in the Disney animated series Pepper Ann (1997–2001).

== Personal life ==
At the time of his enlistment in the U.S. Marines, he listed "none" on the section of the form asking about religion. During his difficult recovery from blackwater fever, he returned to his Catholic faith as he prayed to survive.

Adams divorced Adelaide in 1960 and married Dorothy Bracken, an actress. He left Bracken in 1977 to marry actress Judy Luciano, with whom he had one child. That marriage also ended in divorce. He had seven children: Carolyn, Christine, Cathy, Cecily, Stacey, Sean and Beige. Cecily died of lung cancer in 2004 and his son Sean died in 2006 at age 35 of a brain tumor, a year after Don Adams's death.

His brother Richard Paul Yarmy, also known as Dick Yarmy (February 14, 1932 – May 5, 1992), was an actor. His sister Gloria Yarmy Burton was a writer. Robert Karvelas, who played the role of Agent Larabee on Get Smart, was Adams's cousin on his mother's side of the family.

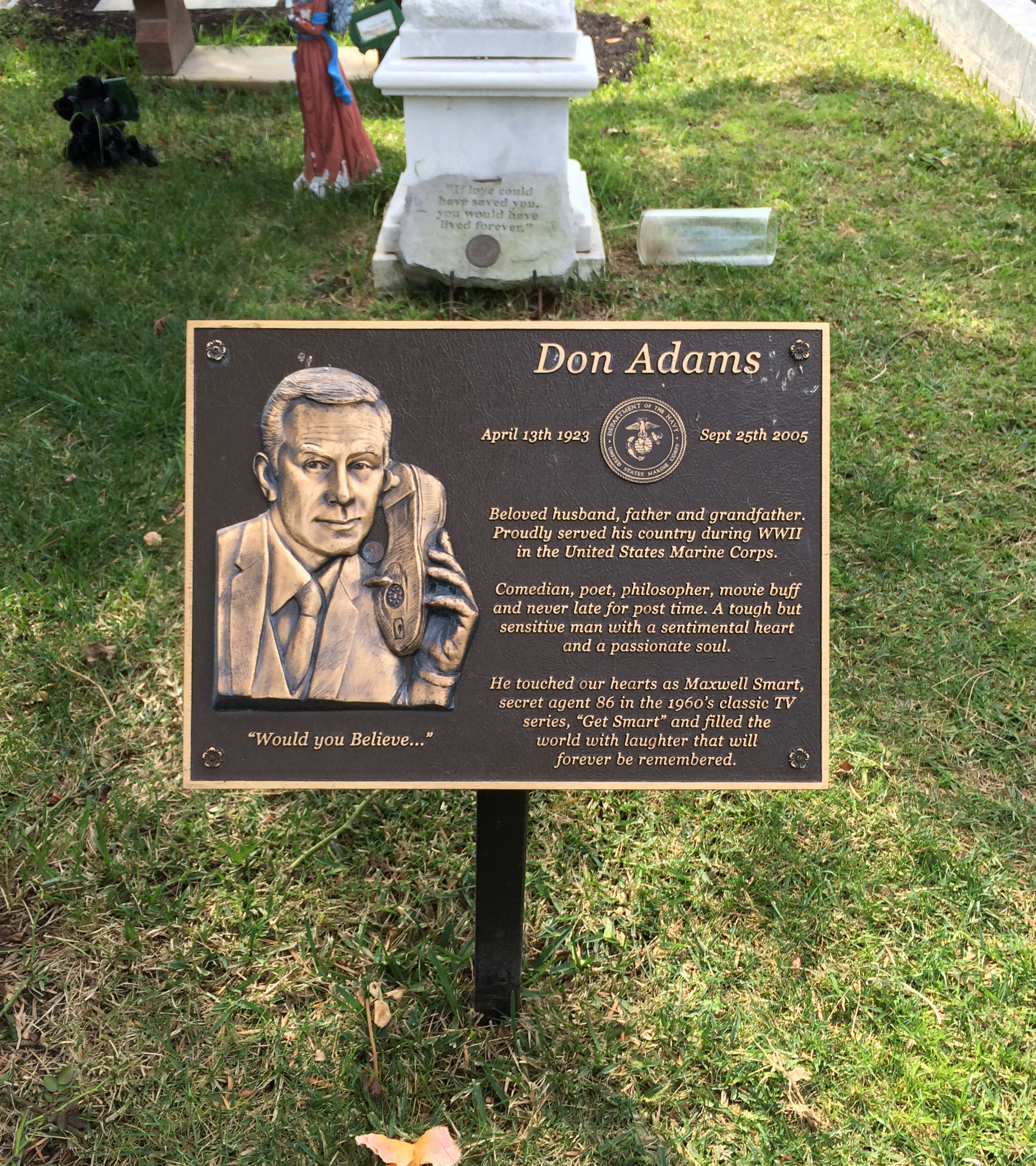
Grave of Don Adams at Hollywood Forever

A compulsive gambler, according to his longtime friend Bill Dana, Adams "could be very devoted to his family if you reminded him about it, [but] Don's whole life was focused around gambling".

== Death ==
Adams died on September 25, 2005, at Cedars-Sinai Medical Center in Los Angeles, California. He suffered from lymphoma and a lung infection. His health had declined after the death of his daughter Cecily. Before his death, Adams had joked about not wanting a mournful funeral, preferring, he said, to have his friends get together "and bring me back to life".

Among his eulogists were his decades-long friends Barbara Feldon, Don Rickles, James Caan, Bill Dana and his son-in-law, actor Jim Beaver (widower of Adams's daughter Cecily). His funeral Mass was held at the Church of the Good Shepherd in Beverly Hills. He is interred in Hollywood Forever Cemetery.

== Filmography ==
=== Film ===
Year	Title	Role	Notes
1962	The Longest Day	Ltjg Mackenzie	(uncredited)
1980	The Nude Bomb	Maxwell Smart	
1982	Jimmy the Kid	Harry Walker	
1987	Back to the Beach	Harbour Master	
1999	Inspector Gadget	Brain the Dog (voice)	Final film role

=== Television ===
Year	Title	Role	Notes
1963–1964	The Bill Dana Show	Byron Glick	Main cast (15 episodes)
1963–1966	Tennessee Tuxedo and His Tales	Tennessee Tuxedo (voice)	Lead role (70 episodes)
1965–1970	Get Smart	Maxwell Smart	Lead role (138 episodes)
1966	Bob Hope Presents the Chrysler Theatre	Himself (guest)	Episode: "Murder at NBC"
1967	The Carol Burnett Show	Himself (guest)	Episode: 1.11
1967	The Danny Thomas Hour	Harry	Episode: "Instant Money"
1968	Laugh-In	Himself (guest)	Episode: 1.4
1970	Pat Paulsen's Half a Comedy Hour	Dolf Clem	Episode: "Episode #1.9"
1971	Confessions of a Top Crime Buster	Det. Lennie Crooke	TV movie
1971–1972	The Partners	Det. Lennie Crooke	Lead role (20 episodes)
1973	Saga of Sonora	Himself (host)	Television special
1973	The New Scooby-Doo Movies	Himself (voice)	Episode: "The Exterminator"
1973	Wait Till Your Father Gets Home	Don Gibson Jr. (voice)	Episode: "Don for the Defense"
1975	Don Adams' Screen Test	Himself (host)	13 episodes
1976	Three Times Daley	Bob Daley	Television pilot
1976	The Love Boat	Donald Richardson	TV movie
1978	The Love Boat	Lenny Camen	Episode: "One More Time"
1979	Fantasy Island	Cornelius Wieselfarber	Episode: "The Red Baron"
1980	The Love Boat	William Robinson	Episode: "We Three"
1980	Murder Can Hurt You!	Narrator (voice)	TV movie
1982	The Love Boat	Sidney Williams	Episode: "Safety Last"
1983	The Love Boat	Sam Corey	Episode: "The Very Temporary Secretary"
1983–1985	Inspector Gadget	Inspector Gadget (voice)	Lead role (86 episodes)
1984	The Love Boat	Walter Love	Episode: "Novelties"
1984	The Fall Guy	Sheriff	Episode: "Losers Wheepers: Part 1"
1985–1988	Check It Out!	Howard Bannister	Lead role (66 episodes)
1989	Get Smart, Again!	Maxwell Smart	TV movie
1992	Inspector Gadget Saves Christmas	Inspector Gadget (voice)	Television special
1994	Empty Nest	Don Adams	Episode: "Charley's Millions"
1995	Get Smart	Maxwell Smart	Lead role (7 episodes)
1995–1996	Gadget Boy & Heather	Gadget Boy (voice)	Lead role (26 episodes)
1996–1998	Inspector Gadget's Field Trip	Inspector Gadget (voice)	Lead role (27 episodes)
1997	Nick Freno: Licensed Teacher	Principal	Episode: "Gargoyle Guys"
1997–1998	Gadget Boy's Adventures in History	Gadget Boy (voice)	Lead role (26 episodes)
1997–2001	Pepper Ann	Principal Hickey (voice)	Additional voices (24 episodes)
