= The Partners =

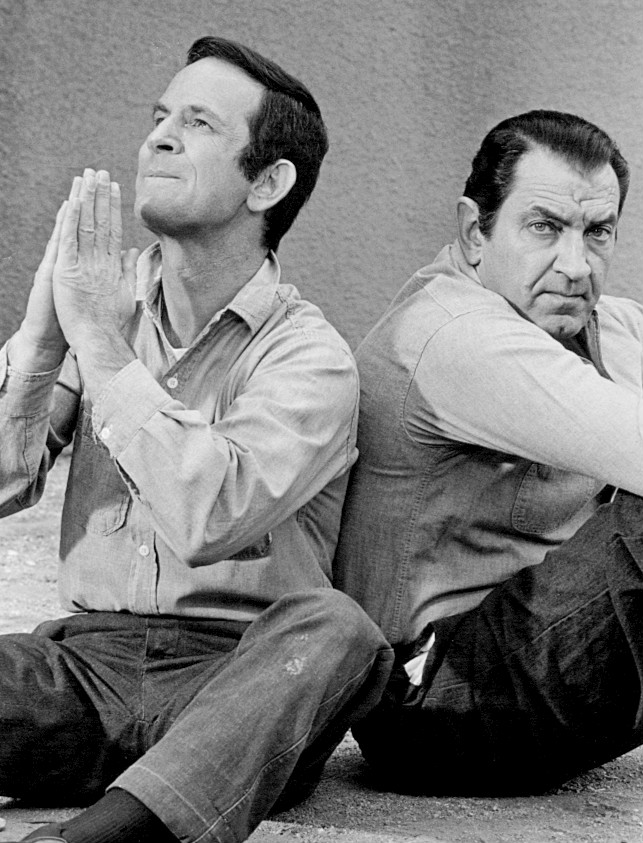
- Don Adams and Bruce Gordon in Two in a Pen
- Genre: Sitcom
- Written by: Earl Barret; Bruce Howard; Laurence Marks; Ed Simmons
- Directed by: Don Adams; Earl Bellamy; Richard Benedict; Gary Nelson
- Starring: Don Adams; Rupert Crosse
- Composers: Richard Hazard; Lalo Schifrin
- Country of origin: United States
- Original language: English
- No. of seasons: 1
- No. of episodes: 20

Production
- Executive producer: Arne Sultan
- Producers: Arne Sultan; Lee Wolfberg
- Cinematography: William Cronjager; Meredith M. Nicholson
- Running time: 26 min.
- Production companies: Don/Lee Productions; Universal Television

Original release
- Network: NBC
- Release: September 18, 1971 – September 8, 1972

The Partners is an American sitcom that aired from September 18, 1971, through September 8, 1972, on NBC. This short-lived series marked Don Adams' return to starring in a TV show, just over a year after the cancellation of Get Smart, in a comic role very similar to the one that made him famous.

== Synopsis ==
The program featured Don Adams and Rupert Crosse as bumbling detectives, and John Doucette their exasperated commanding officer. Dick Van Patten played the sycophantic desk sergeant. Robert Karvelas had a recurring role as Freddie, who compulsively confessed to crimes he did not commit.

The pilot featured guest appearances by Joey Forman, Art Metrano, and Yvonne Craig.

== Production notes ==
Unlike many television programs of its day, The Partners eschewed a traditional opening title sequence. The opening credits were merely interspersed during the first few minutes, akin to the technique that has become quite commonplace today. The theme music, which accompanied the closing credits and occasionally popped up during the program itself, was composed by Lalo Schifrin, best known for the theme to Mission: Impossible.

== Characters ==
Unlike many other sitcoms of the 1960s and 70s, there is no family seen in the show. There are not many characters altogether.

Detective Sergeant Lennie Crooke: (Don Adams) Det. Sgt. Lennie Crooke is a slightly inept police detective, a bit similar to Adams' previous character on Get Smart, Maxwell Smart. Details on his life and family are very sparse. He has mentioned on one or two occasions that he has acrophobia, and the fear of heights, and he was never in Korea, according to his statement in the pilot episode, Here Come The Fuzz. He has a likelihood to forget things that no other sane detective would forget, including his pants. He is not married and we do see him inside his apartment on one or two occasions. It appears to be very neat with every personal item in its own place. He isn't too intelligent and is prone to get everyone in a room confused in his attempts to carry on an intelligent conversation. He tends to dislike the desk Sergeant Higgenbottem, who in turn doesn't seem to like Lennie. The two will argue about anything, such as how "It's not true that George let me escape but it is true that I locked George in the closet, so when I said it was true, I was referring to how it wasn't true that that was true" or how "They stole 13 cars in the last two weeks and that makes 14 if you count our car, but then they stole our other car which would make it 15 but then the car we found in the driveway takes it back to down to 14." To which Higgenbottem will reply, "No, I'm counting both your cars and that car because whether you found it or not it was originally stolen and I'm also counting the Rolls-Royce so that makes 16." And then Lennie will continue to argue that he had forgotten the Rolls-Royce and that made it 15 again, and so they would go on until Captain Andrews put a stop to it. The two seem to rather enjoy these comical arguments, in fact. Lennie was in every episode.

Detective George Robinson: (Rupert Crosse) George is Lennie's best friend, longtime partner, and sarcastic steadying force. He was in every episode. He is a tall black man, prone to roll his eyes and shake his head at Lennie and his antics, and even less is known about him. He was in Korea, and while he has no fear of heights, he often does seem to have a fear of Lennie's driving. He notices things that go right over his partner's head, and he is the one that keeps Lennie, and sometimes Higgenbottem, from making complete fools of themselves. He doesn't seem to have a very large affinity for Higgenbottem, in fact in the pilot episode when Higgenbottom was reading the report on what the two partners had messed up, and was continually adding in pieces to the sentence that were charging the two with worse crimes, George offered to 'make a suggestion that might help the situation.' -- "Ask Higgenbottem to leave the room."

Captain Aaron William Andrews: (John Doucette) Captain Andrews is a sarcastic police captain, the boss of Lennie and George, who plays a role similar to that of the one Ed Platt played in Get Smart, as The Chief of CONTROL. He really does like Lennie and George in spite of his many sarcastic statements. A good example of his sarcasm: Higgenbottem, whom he is friends with, bursts into the room exclaiming that they have a "code 64," Lennie tells him to take it to the animal shelter because that's a lost dog. "No, that's a code 65." Higgenbottem said. "Oh, of course," Lennie answered, "I was confusing it with a code 63--" "Which is someone being assaulted," corrected Higginbottem, as Captain Andrews exclaimed, looking pointedly at Lennie, "And we may have one in this room at any moment!"

Sgt. Nelson Higgenbottem.: (Dick Van Patten) The sycophantic desk Sergeant Higgenbottom is a small man who loves any chance to grate on Lennie's nerves and enjoys arguing with Lennie as well, only tolerates George but still looks for chances to annoy him too, and who does whatever Captain Andrews asks, and generally sides with him. Lennie has a habit of starting a sentence off with "Well, at least there's one good thing that came out of this..." after he's done something stupid. Higgenbottem always answers the same way, saying eagerly, "You're leaving the force?"

Freddie Butler: Don Adams' real life cousin, Robert Karvelas, who played Agent Larabee on Get Smart, played Freddie Butler, who was in seven episodes. He is always chronically confessing to other people's crimes, and consistently manages to drive Lennie, George, and Higgenbottem and Captain Andrews crazy. When he appears, Lennie usually exclaims, "Just what I can't stand right now, Freddie Butler!"

== Reception ==
NBC had exceptionally high hopes for the series after it performed well with test audiences. However, it failed to find a large enough audience because it aired Saturday nights at 8:00pm—right up against the highest-rated show on television, CBS's All in the Family. (Originally, CBS had scheduled My Three Sons against The Partners, but substituted All in the Family at the last minute.) After their January 8, 1972, broadcasts, NBC removed both The Partners and fellow freshman sitcom The Good Life from its schedule. (The move worked out for the network, as they were replaced with the medical drama Emergency!, which was a hit and ran six seasons.) Fifteen episodes of the show had aired by January; five more would be "burned off" in the summer of 1972. The show ranked 66th out of 78 shows that season with an average 12.5 rating.

Furthermore, the series failed to attract audiences due to the performances of Don Adams and Rupert Crosse as two extremely inept police detectives, employing an absurd and innocent style of humor inspired by Get Smart. However, in the early 1970s, public tastes changed drastically towards comedies with a more realistic, transgressive, or socially critical tone, which rendered Don Adams' formula completely obsolete. Crosse died six months after the cancellation of this series from an aggressive lung cancer, which was his last performance.

The Partners has never been officially released on home video, but several websites offer low-quality bootleg DVDs of the series.

== Episodes ==
No.	Title	Directed by	Written by	Original release date
1	"Here Comes the Fuzz"	Gary Nelson	Don Adams & Earl Barret & Arne Sultan	September 18, 1971
Lennie and George get off to a shaky start on their assignment to capture a bank robber by damaging their unmarked police car, entering the wrong apartment and wearing the wrong clothes.
2	"Abra Cadaver"	Gary Nelson	Arne Sultan & Earl Barret	September 25, 1971
While investigating a death threat, Lennie and George watch their intended victim disappear twice before their eyes.
3	"The Prisoner of Fender"	Richard Benedict	Arne Sultan & Earl Barret	October 2, 1971
During their assignment to pick up hoodlum Tony Kelso, Lennie and George end up in jail when two men impersonating them beat them to Kelso.
4	"Waterloo at Napoleon"	Gary Nelson	Burt Styler	October 9, 1971
Lennie and George not only foul up their assignment to investigate a kidnapping and money laundering, but succeed in doing the same to an FBI man.
5	"How Many Carats in a Grapefruit?"	Gary Nelson	Story by : Ferdinand Leon; Teleplay by : Arne Sultan & Earl Barret	October 16, 1971
While investigating the jewel robbery of the century, Lennie and George get sidetracked by a grapefruit in which George's mother is unwittingly carrying a stolen diamond.
6	"Witness for the Execution"	Joseph Pevney	Bruce Howard	October 23, 1971
As Lennie prepares to testify against a mobster, he learns that a contract has been put out on his life, which results in George being assigned to guard him.
7	"To Catch a Crooke"	Gary Nelson	Ed Simmons	October 30, 1971
After Lennie is arrested when his gun is found at the scene of the crime, he escapes to prove his innocence.
8	"Requiem for a Godfather"	Christian Nyby	Arne Sultan & Earl Barret	November 6, 1971
After a million dollar robbery is committed, Lennie and George find themselves in pursuit of the wrong vehicle.
9	"Take My Wife, Please"	Charles Rondeau	Laurence Marks	November 13, 1971
After a bank robbery goes wrong, the thieves decide to hold the bank president's wife for ransom.
10	"Have I Got an Apartment for You!"	Don Adams	Ed Simmons	November 27, 1971
Lennie becomes the victim of bunco artists during his search for a new apartment.
11	"Our Butler Didn't Do It"	Don Adams	Ed Simmons	December 4, 1971
A chronic confessor to crimes almost convinces everybody that he is telling the truth for the first time when discussing the murder of his therapist.
12	"New Faces"	Don Adams	Lawrence Marks	December 11, 1971
A second chance and a doctor's prescription help Lennie and George catch a criminal who is using plastic surgery to change his appearance.
13	"North Is Now South"	Earl Bellamy	Milt Rosen	December 18, 1971
City rezoning causes an uproar in the protection racket when rival gangs claim the same territory.
14	"Desperate Ours"	Gary Nelson	Arne Sultan & Earl Barret	December 25, 1971
Higgenbottom is taken hostage by an escaped killer who is seeking revenge on Andrews for testifying against him.
15	"They Steal Cars, Don't They?"	Gary Nelson	Bruce Howard	January 8, 1972
During an investigation of what appears to be an organized car-stealing ring, Lennie and George lose not only their car, but the police captain's vehicle as well.
16	"Headlines for Higgenbottom"	Earl Barret	Arne Sultan & Earl Barret	July 28, 1972
In attempt to boost Higgenbottom's stature with his son, Lennie and George decide to take him on one of their cases.
17	"Magnificent Perception"	Richard Benedict	Ben Starr	August 4, 1972
A famed psychic is hired by the police department to locate "The Bomber" before he causes severe damage to the city.
18	"Two or False"	Earl Bellamy	Bruce Howard	August 11, 1972
Lennie and George get into double trouble as they attempt to catch a jewel thief when Lennie is tricked into letting the thief steal her latest prize.
19	"Two in a Pen"	Earl Bellamy	Bruce Howard	August 25, 1972
After word of a jailbreak surfaces, Lennie and George go undercover in the prison, with Lennie as an inmate and George as a guard.
20	"The 217 in 402"	Richard Benedict	Jerry Mayer	September 8, 1972
In an attempt to protect an informer from a hit man, Lennie acts as a decoy by posing as a patient in a coma.
