= Coby Ruskin =

American television director (1911–1987)

- Born: October 15, 1911; New York, New York, U.S.
- Died: March 3, 1987 (aged 75); Los Angeles, California, U.S.
- Education: Lafayette University
- Alma mater: The Sorbonne
- Occupation: Television director
- Years active: c. 1939–1975
- Spouse: Louise Kaye (née Lucille Catherine Keicher) (m. circa 1940)

Coby Ruskin (October 15, 1911 – March 3, 1987) was an American television director and stage actor/director whose 1950s career was severely impacted by the Hollywood blacklist. He later worked extensively on sitcoms such as The Dick Van Dyke Show, The Andy Griffith Show, Gomer Pyle – USMC, The Bill Cosby Show, and Here's Lucy.

== Early life and career ==
A native New Yorker, Ruskin earned his Bachelor of Arts from Lafayette College and a Master's in French literature from The Sorbonne.

In May 1950, Ruskin—as Gobo the Clown—hosted the weekly children's show, Gobo's Circus, on WNBT in New York.

On the sitcom Here's Lucy, Ruskin directed every one of the final three season's episodes with the exception of the last six, which marked the return of the show's original director, Jack Donohue.

In an interview published in 1998, Andy Griffith scripter—and former actor—Harvey Bullock fondly recalls his first-ever encounter with Ruskin (presumably circa fall 1957).

The director, Coby Ruskin, was a darling man. I knew him vaguely from England, where he was directing a TV series. It was some sort of show with guest entertainers. I was in a comedy at the Garrick Theater London, and a segment from the play was to air on this show. The actors all trooped in for rehearsal with Coby, who was directing the segment. He was just marvelous. When he finished, the segment was better than anything else in our play, and we all wished that he had directed the whole thing. I will never forget it. His talent, his understanding and warmth just enveloped you, filled you with confidence, and made you as steady as a rock. Coby, you were great!”

A not dissimilar note had been struck nearly four decades earlier, when, in 1959, Kathryn Kohnfelder Murray recounted her—and husband Arthur Murray's—nearly-decade-long on-air collaboration with Ruskin.

Coby has been with us ever since [1951], and I will always be grateful to him for encouraging me to be creative.[...] Coby had been an actor and a stage director before he entered television. He has unusual talent for comedy and is himself a skilled pantomimist. After he had been with us for a few months he suggested that I add to my M.C. role. As he put it, 'Let’s put Katie in the act.' I reminded him that I had no stage experience, that I couldn’t sing and that my dancing was limited to the ballroom variety. So he started me as a performer with record pantomimes which were then a popular novelty. To these, he soon added some incidental dance steps.

Ruskin's success in unleashing Mrs. Murray's hitherto wasted talents and creativity would eventually prompt TV host and humorist Sam Levenson to borrow an ancient but still pertinent quip, noting that Murray "makes his living by the sweat of his Frau."

== Personal life and death ==
From at least 1940 on, Ruskin was married to Pittsburgh-born singer Lois—aka Louise—Kaye (née Lucille Catherine Keicher).

Survived by his wife, Ruskin died in Los Angeles on March 3, 1987, at age 75, from what Chuck Warn, speaking for the Writers Guild of America, described as "complications after surgery."

== Works ==
- Gobo's Circus (1950) – Host—as "Gobo the Clown"—and commercial reader
- All Star Revue (1950) 2 episodes
- The Sammy Kaye Show (1951) 1 episode
- The Colgate Comedy Hour (1951) 1 episode
- The Bob & Ray Show (1951–1953)
- The Arthur Murray Party (1951–1959)
- Chelsea at Nine (1957) 5 episodes
- Sword of Freedom (1957)
  - Ep. 1.26 "Angelica's Past"
  - Ep. 1.28 "Christina"
  - Ep. 1.31 "A Game of Chance"
  - Ep. 1.33 "The Reluctant Duke"
- Just Polly and Me (1960), CBS special feat. Phil Silvers and Polly Bergen
- The Bob Newhart Show (1961–1962)
- The All-Star Comedy Hour (1962)
- The Dick Van Dyke Show (1962–1963)
- The Danny Thomas Show (1963) 5 episodes
- Alcoa Premiere (1963)
  - Ep. 2.18 "George Gobel Presents"
- The Bill Dana Show
- Mickey (1964) 2 episodes
- The Andy Griffith Show (1964–1965)
- Hank (1965)
- Li'l Abner (1966), unsold NBC pilot—aired 9/67—starring Sammy Jackson and Jeannine Riley
- Off to See the Wizard (1968)
- The Good Guys (1968–1969)
- Julia (1968–1971)
- The Jim Nabors Hour
- The Doris Day Show
- The Bill Cosby Show
  - "The Elevator Doesn't Stop Here Anymore"
- Love American Style
- Here's Lucy (1970–1974)
  - Ep. "Lucy and the Franchise Fiasco" (1973) – Drunk
- Arnie (1971)
- Sanford and Son (1972)
- Bridget Loves Bernie (1972)
- The Paul Lynde Show (1973)
- When Things Were Rotten (1975)
