= Harry Dolan =

American writer (1927–1981)

Harry Dolan (November 5, 1927 – September 7, 1981) was a writer for and the director of the Watts Writers Workshop created by Budd Schulberg. He started off as a janitor and became one of the most serious African American writers of his time. Through his contributions and efforts in the Watts Writers’ Workshop he raised awareness in the United States' racial conflict during the 1960s.

== Early life and education ==
Harry Dolan was born in Pittsburgh and attended Pittsburgh High and Carnegie Tech. Studying to be an architect, he failed because he "couldn't make those curvatures," he said once. During his seven years in the Coast Guard that followed, he had ample time to satisfy his appetite for reading books and "all kinds of writing." After his discharge, he worked as fiction editor of The Boston Sun. Leaving the East for California with his family in 1962, he found a position as a janitor at the Los Angeles City Hall, another job that left his mind free for reading and writing. He was attending Los Angeles Harbor College when the Watts riots erupted in 1965. A reference to Budd Schulberg's Watts Writers Workshop in Jet magazine prompted him to join the workshop.

== Watts Writers Workshop ==
"The Workshop participants had one thing in common: a desire to write—poetry, essay, and stories based on life experiences. Often their writings laid bare ‘the angers, fears, frustrations’ of the people living in Watts". In 1966 Harry Dolan, along with Schulberg and Johnie Scott, testified before "the Ribicoff Committee of the United States Congress, which was investigating urban dislocation and the problems of African Americans living in American cities". This was just one of the redefining opportunities that the Workshop created for themselves that year.

"The individual words of the writers in the Workshop changed the perception of post-1965 Watts from the National Guard—studded streets to an active arena of spiritual and cultural struggle". In his "short prose piece," Will There Be Another Riot in Watts? Dolan's writing style gave a voice to the topic of "cultural blindness toward 'injustice'". The author drew "attention to the severity of the issue," and ultimately, "achieved a forum".

=== Rise and success ===
As the success of the Workshop grew, it "drew the attention of the Los Angeles press". As a result, "NBC TV devoted an hour of prime time to present 'The Angry Voices of Watts’ on August 16, 1966'". Among the writers, Harry Dolan made a name for himself with his plays, specifically his teleplay Losers and Weepers, which was originally written for Mystery Digest and had a cast of white characters and a plot "about a poor family, where the young boy decided to go for the money. At the time the emphasis was on the missing money—that was the magazines interest". Criticism from Workshop participants made Dolan change the plot to one depicting the "frustrations and impotence of a Negro family's life in an urban ghetto". The play highlighted the "oppressive, destructive possibilities of the Negro slum matriarchy". In February 1967, Losers and Weepers was broadcast on national television as the first episode of NBC Experiment in Television.

Losers and Weepers was the start to Dolan's success. Shortly after the play became a hit he was "signed by Warner Bros. Seven Arts to adapt the Broadway show 'No Strings' to the screen".

In 1970, Dolan and writer/singer Dee Dee McNeal produced Dolan's play The Iron Hand of Nat Turner. "The play recounted the story of an 1831 Virginia slave rebellion from the point of view of its leader, preacher, and slave, Nat Turner". Dolan, besides looking after his wife and six children, was also deeply involved in the Watts writers' personal lives. He created leaders out of "men and women trying to make their way in the community as artists". Through his mentoring, he molded Workshop writers such as Amde and Otis (both of The Watts Prophets), making "Amde assistant director, and [asking] Otis to take over as the poetry and creative writing instructor".
