= Kallikak =

Kallikak may refer to:

- The Kallikak Family, a 1912 book by Henry H. Goddard
- The Kallikaks, a 1977 American TV series
