= Exquisite corpse =

Surrealist automatic writing & art technique

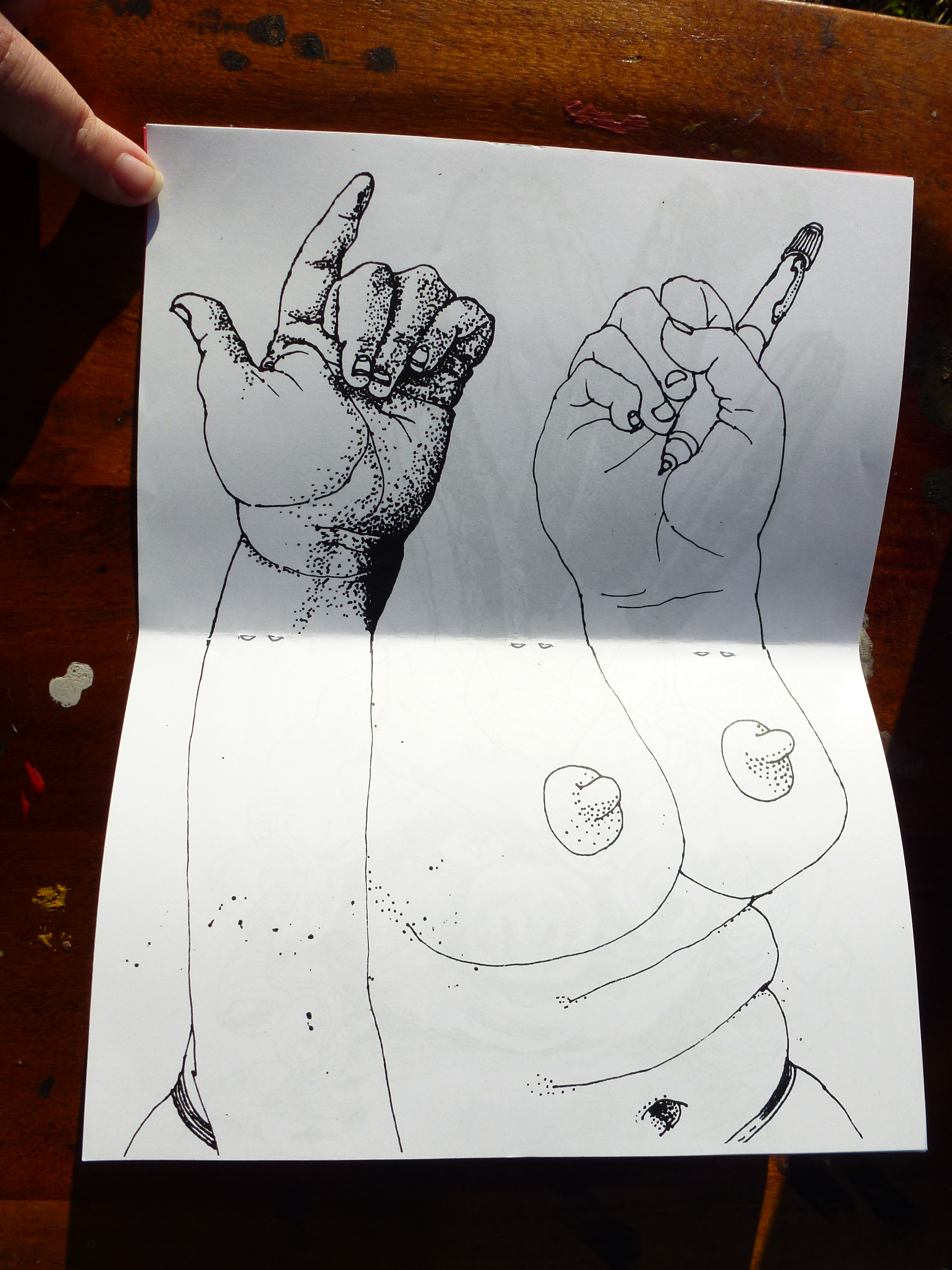
Exquisite corpse drawing

Exquisite corpse (from the original French term cadavre exquis, lit. 'exquisite cadaver') is a method by which a collection of words or images is assembled. Each collaborator adds to a composition in sequence, either by being allowed to see only the end of what the previous person contributed or by following a rule for the kind of words to be used (e.g., "The adjective noun adverb verb the adjective noun." as in "The green duck sweetly sang the dreadful dirge.").

== History ==
This technique was invented by surrealists and is similar to an old parlour game called consequences in which players write in turn on a sheet of paper, fold it to conceal part of the writing, and then pass it to the next player for a further contribution. Surrealism's principal founder André Breton reported that it started in fun, but became playful and eventually enriching. Breton said the diversion started about 1925, but Pierre Reverdy wrote that it started much earlier, at least as early as 1918.

The name is derived from a phrase that resulted when Surrealists first played the game, "Le cadavre exquis boira le vin nouveau." ("The exquisite corpse shall drink the new wine.") André Breton writes that the game developed at the residence of friends at an old house in Montparnasse, 54 rue du Château (no longer existing). Besides himself he mentions Marcel Duhamel, Jacques Prévert, Yves Tanguy and Benjamin Péret as original participants.

Henry Miller often played the game to pass time in French cafés during the 1930s.

In 1932, artists Frida Kahlo and Lucienne Bloch created two near-nude exquisite corpses. One is titled "Frida" and the other "Diego" (likely meant to represent Kahlo herself and her husband, muralist Diego Rivera).

== Picture consequences ==
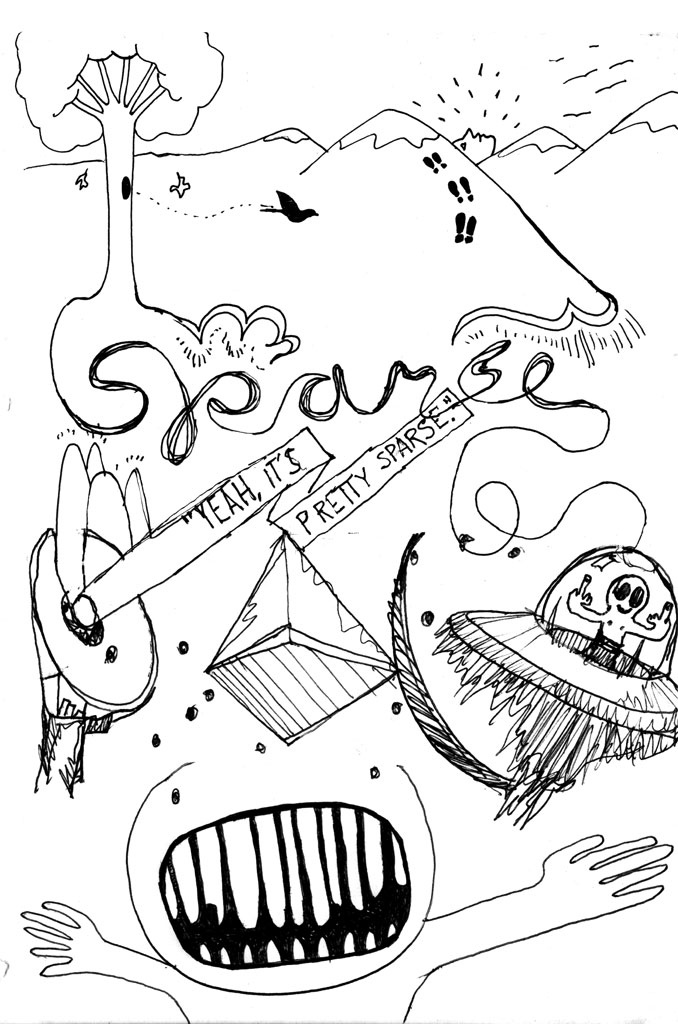
A four-person (four-sectioned) exquisite corpse drawing, 2011

Later the game was adapted to drawing and collage, in a version called picture consequences, with portions of a person replacing the written sentence fragments of the original. The person is traditionally drawn in four steps: The head, the torso, the legs and the feet with the paper folded after each portion so that later participants cannot see earlier portions. The finished product is similar to children's books in which the pages were cut into thirds, the top third pages showing the head of a person or animal, the middle third the torso, and the bottom third the legs, with children having the ability to "mix and match" by turning the partial pages.

Another variation of the exquisite corpse also called "picture consequences" is Telephone Pictionary, a game in which players alternate writing descriptions and matching illustrations based on the previous step.

== In popular culture ==
- The Exquisite Corpse (1967) a novel by Alfred Chester.
- Exquisite Corpse (1996) is a Gothic horror novel by Poppy Z. Brite.
- Space and Time magazine builds a community exquisite corpse monthly on their website.
- Naked Came the Stranger is a 1969 erotic novel written as a literary hoax to parody American literary trends of the time. The credited author is the fictive "Penelope Ashe", though it was written by twenty-four journalists led by Mike McGrady, with each author writing a chapter without any knowledge of what the others had written.
- Exquisite Corpse is a literary magazine founded in 1983 (later in online version from 1999) published by Andrei Codrescu.
- Naked Came the Manatee (Putnam, 1996) is a mystery thriller parody novel. Each of its thirteen chapters was written, in sequence, by a different Florida writer, beginning with Dave Barry and ending with Carl Hiaasen.
- Folio of 28 Exquisite corpse drawings collected from Queensland Art Gallery's First Asia Pacific Triennial of Contemporary Art (APT1) artists' retreat, Bangalow, NSW, 20–23 September 1993. Held in the QAGOMA Research Library collection.

=== Art ===
- The Narrative Corpse (Gates of Heck, 1995) is a comic book chain-story by 69 all-star cartoonists co-edited by Art Spiegelman and R. Sikoryak.
- The Breaking Boredom Project in graphic design, Cairo (2008).
- The Exquisite Corpse Adventure (Candlewick, 2011), commissioned by the Library of Congress, uses well-known children's authors and illustrators
- Jake and Dinos Chapman have produced a number of exquisite corpses.
- Eric Croes, Cadavre exquis, Chat Santiag (2017). Croes used his exquisite corpse drawing to make this clay sculpture.
- A Cheese and Tomato Spider (1998) and a number of other books by author Nick Sharratt allow children to construct crazy combinations from images on half-pages.
- Exquisite Corpus (2023) by Kevin Blackistone uses machine learning to create "3d chimeras of the human interior" using medical imaging data.

=== Film and television ===
- Apichatpong Weerasethakul's 2000 film Mysterious Object at Noon uses this technique with a mixture of documentary and fictional film.
- The Exquisite Corpse Project is a 2012 feature-length comedy film written using the exquisite corpse technique.
- Cartoon Network and Adult Swim had created various "Exquisite Corpse" promos, with examples such as Rick and Morty 2017 trailer for season 3 titled "Exquisite Corpse" features a sequence to the song "Thursday in the Danger Room" from the album Run the Jewels 3 by Run the Jewels.
- Likewise, the finale for Uncle Grandpa by the title “Exquisite Grandpa” follows the exact rule of the Exquisite Corpse with over 10 storyboard artists involved.
- Adult Swim's The Elephant makes use of the concept of the exquisite corpse throughout the whole process of the short film, displaying how the game can work in a different medium entirely.
- Exquisite Corps as well as And So Say All of Us are choreographic versions by filmmaker Mitchell Rose.
- A sketch in Limmy's Show Season 3 Episode 1 involves a game of exquisite corpse being played in a bar.

=== Music ===
- In the 1940s, composers John Cage, Virgil Thomson, Henry Cowell, and Lou Harrison, composed a set of pieces using this same process—writing a measure of music, with 1 or 2 additional notes (sources differ), folding it on the bar line then passing it to the next person. The pieces were later arranged by Robert Hughes and published as Party Pieces.
- The band Bauhaus include the track "Exquisite Corpse" on their third studio album (The Sky's Gone Out) (1982), which appears to have been created in this collaborative surrealist style. They returned to the method for 2022's "Drink the New Wine", their first new song in 14 years.
- The fifth track on the 1992 album Sacred City by the British rock band Shriekback is "Exquisite Corpse".
- The They Might Be Giants 1996 song "Exquisite Dead Guy."
- The musical Hedwig and the Angry Inch (1998) includes the song "Exquisite Corpse".
- The band Warpaint named their debut EP Exquisite Corpse (2008) because of their collaborative songwriting style.
- George Watsky's 2016 album x Infinity features the song "Exquisite Corpse" using this technique featuring verses by several artists.
- In December 2019, French alternative-pop-rock band Therapie TAXI released the album Cadavre Exquis, relating to the artistic visuals and collaborative production of the opus.
- Swedish composer Anders Hillborg uses the technique in his 2002 orchestral work Exquisite Corpse.
- In September 2020, Polyvinyl Records released an 11-track compilation titled Exquisite Corpse, featuring over 45 of the label's artists including The Get Up Kids, Jeff Rosenstock and American Football, among others. The tracks were recorded remotely in the style of the game during the COVID-19 pandemic and a portion of the physical and digital album sales were donated to the non-profit MusiCares.
- In August 2022, the free improvisation group G.at.0 (Pedro Alcalde, Núria Andorrà, Marina Hervás, Wade Matthews, Henar Rivière) presented 17 minutes of free improvisation ("Cadavre Exquis") at the IF 2022 – Improvisation Festival, organized and streamed online by the International Institute for Critical Studies in Improvisation (IICSI) at the University of Guelph, Canada. The piece, co-presented by 17, Instituto de Estudios Críticos, was an example of collective spontaneous creation, where each performer contributed unpredictably, resulting in a collaborative and experimental sonic work.

=== Architecture ===
- In 2018, Simon Weir began producing catenary vaults where a dozen designers collaborate blindly using the exquisite corpse method.

=== Games ===
- In ... and then we died, players use word-fragment tarot cards to form words to tell the story of their collective deaths.
- The online party video game Gartic Phone added an exquisite corpse mode in 2024, in which three different artists collaborate by individually drawing a person's head, torso, and legs.

== See also ==
- Photoshop tennis
- Poietic Generator
- Comic jam
- Round-robin story
- Mindmap
- Surrealist techniques
- Chinese whispers
- Mad Libs
- Reanimated collaboration
