= Larry Sloan =

American publisher

Lloyd Lawrence "Larry" Sloan (1922 – October 14, 2012) was an American publisher of Mad Libs and co-founder of the Los Angeles publishing company, Price Stern Sloan, which opened in the early 1960s.

== Biography ==
Sloan was born Lloyd Lawrence Solomon to a Jewish family in New York City in 1922, the son of Joseph Solomon and Freida Lewis Solomon. His mother opened a clothing business and his father was a graduate of Columbia Law School 1908 lawyer. Sloan and his parents moved to Los Angeles after his only sibling, Grenna Sloan, moved to California to pursue an acting career. Larry Sloan initially studied at the University of California, Los Angeles (UCLA), but soon left college to enlist in the United States Army following the outbreak of World War II. He later attended Stanford University, where he studied Chinese.

He returned to Los Angeles after the war. Sloan became a columnist for the Hollywood Citizen News and a reporter for several magazines covering Hollywood's entertainment and gossip industries. Sloan's connections led to a career transition as a press agent and publicist representing Carol Channing, Mae West, and Elizabeth Taylor, among others.

In 1958, television writer Leonard B. Stern and comedian Roger Price launched Mad Libs, a word game book series which the duo had first invented in 1953. Stern and Price had named the game "Mad Libs" after overhearing an argument between an actor and talent agent at a New York City restaurant. In the 1960s, Price and Stern partnered with Larry Sloan, a friend from high school, to found Price Stern Sloan, a publishing company based in Los Angeles which published Mad Libs. Sloan was the company's first CEO. Stern later noted in a 1994 Washington Post interview that Sloan "eventually became the business man behind Mad Libs." The company headquartered on La Cienega Boulevard in West Hollywood.

Under Sloan, Price Stern Sloan became one of the largest publishing houses on the West Coast of the United States. In addition to releasing more than 70 editions of Mad Libs under Sloan, the company also published 150 softcover books under Sloan by 1973. While simultaneously CEO, Sloan edited manuscripts submitted for publication. He edited a series of joke books called, World's Worst Jokes. Sloan created and published the successful book, "The VIP Desk Diary, after asking himself "What would somebody's desk diary look like if they were the richest man in the world?" Other successful titles, many of which were humorous, released under Sloan was How to Be a Jewish Mother, written by Dan Greenburg and first released in 1965 and Droodles, which was also created by Roger Price. Still, Mad Libs proved to be one of the company's most successful products, with 110 million copies sold as of 2012.

Larry Sloan further launched Price Stern Sloan's "Wee Sing" product line in the late 1970s. Sloan had found a handmade children's book of the same name, which led to a successful line of books, videos, and audio releases, including Wee Sing Video Series and Wee Sing in Sillyville.

Price Stern Sloan partner and Mad Libs co-creator Roger Price died in 1990. In 1993, Leonard Stern and Larry Sloan sold Price Stern Sloan to Putnam Berkley Group, which is now known as Penguin Group.

Sloan and Stern later co-founded Tallfellow Press, a publishing company specializing in business books based in Beverly Hills. Sloan's daughter, Claudia Sloan, continues to head Tallfellow, as of 2012.

Larry Sloan died from a brief illness at Cedars-Sinai Medical Center in Los Angeles on October 14, 2012, at the age of 89. He was the last surviving founder of Price Stern Sloan, as Leonard Stern had died in 2011. Sloan was survived by his wife of thirty-nine years, Eleanor; five children - Claudia Sloan, Bonnie Smigel-Derin, Liz Fallert, Amy Harrison and Scott Harrison; and six grandchildren. He had been a longtime resident of Malibu, California.
