= Rudolph Borchert =

American screenwriter

- Born: March 27, 1928; Cleveland, Ohio, U.S.
- Died: March 29, 2003 (aged 75); Malibu, California, U.S.
- Occupation: Screenwriter
- Years active: 1970 - 1987
- Spouse: Pamela Byrne (m. 1961)
- Children: 3

Rudolph Borchert (March 27, 1928 – March 29, 2003) was an American screenwriter.

== Early life ==
Borchert was born in Cleveland, Ohio, in 1928. He served in the Korean War as a first lieutenant in a tank battalion, and received a Bronze Star Medal for rescuing one of his troops.

== Career ==
In 1970, Borchert wrote the children's book Bravo, Burro! with novelist John Fante.

Borchert started his television career in 1974, writing a few episodes for the short-lived television series Kolchak: The Night Stalker.

Between 1975 and 1987 Borchert wrote for television shows including, CHiPs, The Rockford Files, Quincy, M.E., Police Woman, Ellery Queen and Scarecrow and Mrs. King. He also wrote the screenplay for the film The Little Dragons. He retired in 1987.

== Death ==
Borchert died in March 2003 after a long illness in Malibu, California, at the age of 75.
