= Just You and Me, Kid =

1979 film by Leonard B. Stern

- Theatrical release poster
- Directed by: Leonard Stern
- Screenplay by: Oliver Hailey; Leonard Stern
- Story by: Tom Lazarus
- Produced by: Jerome M. Zeitman; Irving Fein
- Starring: George Burns; Brooke Shields; Lorraine Gary; Ray Bolger; Leon Ames; Carl Ballantine; Keye Luke; Burl Ives; John Schuck; Nicolas Coster; Andrea Howard; William Russ; Christopher Knight; Julie Cobb
- Cinematography: David M. Walsh
- Edited by: John W. Holmes
- Music by: Jack Elliott
- Production company: Columbia Pictures
- Distributed by: Columbia Pictures
- Release date: July 13, 1979
- Running time: 95 minutes
- Country: United States
- Language: English

Just You and Me, Kid is a 1979 American comedy film starring George Burns, Brooke Shields, Lorraine Gary, Ray Bolger, Leon Ames, Carl Ballantine, Keye Luke and Burl Ives. It was directed by Leonard B. Stern and was released in July 1979 by Columbia Pictures.

== Plot ==
Bill Grant is an elderly ex-vaudevillian who lives alone, often looking at photographs of his deceased wife. Each day after breakfast, he goes to the supermarket, where he is friendly to employees, often charming them with a magic trick.

Kate is a 14-year-old teenager who gets in a squabble with an intimidating man named Demesta. The girl, who is wrapped in a towel and apparently otherwise nude, has locked herself in a bathroom to evade him. Demesta pounds on the door and demands to know the details of a drug deal that Kate has fouled up.

Kate escapes through the window, wearing only the towel, while a police officer knocks on the door of the apartment and grapples with Demesta. He is chased down the street while she goes in a different direction. Kate slips down a hillside staircase, losing the towel in the process, exposing dorsal nudity while fleeing in the nude.

Bill comes out of the grocery store, talking to the bag boy about magic tricks, and opens the trunk of his Pierce Arrow. They both see Kate, lying naked in the trunk, covered partially by a deflated car tire inner tube. Stunned, Bill convinces the bag boy that it was just an illusion and drives away. Stopping on a secluded street, he confronts Kate, who asks him to take her to his house. He reluctantly agrees.

Bill asks Kate what's going on but she refuses to answer. He allows her to take shelter in his home and loans her some of his clothes. Kate attempts to escape by dropping out of a window, spraining her ankle in the process. This attracts the attention of Bill's nosy neighbors, Stan and Sue.

Next, Bill goes to see his friend Max in a nursing home. Max, another ex-vaudevillian and a former roommate, is despondent and non-verbal. Bill visits him daily, cheerfully describing his daily activities. Today, he tells Max about Kate. Later, Bill is confronted by his daughter, Shirl and her husband, Harris. Shirl says Bill is senile and tries to get power of attorney of his bank account. Bill refuses and Shirl becomes furious.

Meanwhile, Demesta is still in a rage. He intimidates Kate's friend Roy, and vows to find Kate, implying that he will harm her.

Stan and Sue step up their meddling, calling Shirl about Kate. Shirl returns, demands to see Kate, and is put off by Bill again, who denies harboring a juvenile.

Kate finally confesses to Bill that she is on the run from a drug dealer. She explains that Demesta gave her money to make a connection but that she threw the cache into the sewer in a moment of panic. Bill advises her to go to the police but Kate is afraid to do so.

That night, Bill's poker buddies arrive and he introduces them to Kate. The evening is interrupted when Shirl returns with two police officers. Kate is concealed with a levitation magic trick and his daughter becomes more furious.

The next day, before Bill leaves to visit Max, Kate relates the story of a boy she once knew who also refused to talk and how he started talking once all the other kids ignored him. During the visit, Bill tells Max that he will never come to see him again unless he talks. Max breaks down and begs Bill not to leave. Bill returns home to find Kate gone and becomes despondent.

Meanwhile, Kate returns to her foster home, collects her belongings, and meets Roy at school. Kate reveals that she never made the connection and still has the $20,000 in cash. Shocked, he tells her that Demesta will kill her. She says she plans to leave town with the money. When Roy tells her that Demesta knows where she has been hiding, she worries for Bill.

After she returns to Bill's house, Demesta forces his way in and a chase ensues. Bill holds Demesta at bay with a sword and incapacitates him. The police are summoned and Demesta is arrested. Shirl arrives and Bill asks her for a favor.

Max packs his belongings, preparing to go back home with Bill, when he learns that Shirl and Harris have agreed to act as foster parents for Kate. Bill explains that Kate will stay with him and Max on the week-ends. The film ends with the threesome departing together.

== Cast ==
- George Burns as Bill Grant
- Brooke Shields as Kate
- Lorraine Gary as Shirley
- Ray Bolger as Tom
- Leon Ames as Manduke the Magnificent
- Carl Ballantine as Reinholf the Remarkable
- Keye Luke as Doctor Device
- Burl Ives as Max Wellington
- John Schuck as Stan Waterman
- Nicolas Coster as Harris
- Andrea Howard as Sue Waterman
- William Russ as John Demesta
- Christopher Knight as Roy
- Julie Cobb as Dr. Nancy Faulkner
- Peter Brandon as Woodrow
- Jacque Lynn Colton as Edna
- Robert Doran as Joseph (Box Boy)
- Ben Frank as First Policeman
- Arthur Rosenberg as Pharmacist
- Roger Price as Mailman
- Tom Leopold as Policeman
- Patrick Cronin as Doctor
- Kate Stern as Student
- Levin Bailey as Student
- Robert Phalen as Foster Father

== Production ==
Brooke Shields received a fee of $250,000 plus six percent of the profits. Alternate titles for the picture were One Night Stand, Two of a Kind and Uncle Bill & The Queen of Hollywood. The original casting for the role of Max played by Burl Ives was Orson Welles (a practicing stage magician in real-life), but he dropped out of the picture. James Stewart was considered for the part. The film, budged at between $10–15 million, was shot in late 1978 at the Burbank Studios in Burbank, California and on location in Los Angeles.

Just You and Me, Kid premiered on 5 July 1979 at the Resorts International Superstar Theatre in Atlantic City, as a charity performance benefiting the Atlantic City Hospital fund.

== Reception ==
The film received fair-to-poor reviews. Reviewers praised George Burns' performance but panned Brooke Shields, with many reviews saying that she was an inadequate film partner for him.

Critic Roger Ebert, in his Chicago Sun-Times newspaper review, gave the film two out of four stars, calling the film "a charming disappointment". On his Sneak Previews TV show with Chicago Tribune film critic Gene Siskel, both Ebert and Siskel gave the film a thumbs down. Siskel said, "Brooke Shields is not very interesting when she's on the screen", did not connect with Burns on-screen, and called her a model "who just can't act". He did say that Burns in the opening scenes of the film before the entrance of Shields' character were "charming", while Ebert said that Burns was "kind of endearing and lovable", but "Brooke Shields seemed kind of bored by the proceedings". Siskel's newspaper review further stated that Shields' part in the film had "no substance, and she is incapable of appearing fresh. It's a stilted, nervous performance from a teen-ager who has not had a single acting lesson and could use a dozen."

== Home media ==
In 2014, the film was released on DVD by Sony Pictures Home Entertainment. The film can be streamed by renting or purchasing the title via the HD digital platform. It has not been released on Blu-ray.
