= Denise Michele =

American actress and model (born 1953)

Playboy centerfold appearance
- April 1976
- Preceded by: Ann Pennington
- Succeeded by: Patricia McClain

Personal details
- Born: June 12, 1953 (age 72); San Francisco, California, United States
- Height: 5 ft 6 in (1.68 m)

Denise Michele (sometimes credited as Denise Kellogg, born June 12, 1953) is a former Playboy magazine's Playmate of the Month, for April 1976. She was born in San Francisco, California and moved to Oahu, Hawaii when she was eight years old, her father's home state. Her Playboy pictorial was shot by Ken Marcus.

She appears on the album cover of Robert Palmer's Some People Can Do What They Like (1976), playing strip poker with Palmer and has numerous modeling credits outside of Playboy, including Almond Joy, Pan Am and Calavo.

She is married to American film director David Kellogg. They have two boys and a girl and reside in Hidden Hills, California, as of July 1999.

She had some minor film roles such as in Tai-Pan, a 1986 film based on the second novel in James Clavell's Asian Saga, and stunt work in Big Trouble in Little China, a 1986 action film, directed by John Carpenter. Michele also appeared in television commercials and the film Three on a Date in 1978, the Hawaii Five-O episode "Nine Dragons" (1976) and The Jeffersons in 1985.

Daina House	Laura Lyons	Ann Pennington	Denise Michele	Patricia McClain	Debra Peterson
Deborah Borkman	Linda Beatty	Whitney Kaine	Hope Olson	Patti McGuire	Karen Hafter
