= Mad Libs =

Comedy word game

The cover of the first Stern and Price Mad Libs book

Mad Libs is a word game created by Leonard Stern and Roger Price. It consists of one player prompting others for a list of words to substitute for blanks in a story before reading aloud. The game is frequently played as a party game or as a pastime. It can be categorized as a phrasal template game.

The game was invented in the United States, and more than 110 million copies of Mad Libs books have been sold since the series was first published in 1958.

== History ==
Mad Libs was invented in 1953 by Leonard Stern and Roger Price. Stern and Price created the game, but could not agree on a name for their invention. No name was chosen until five years later (1958), when Stern and Price were eating Eggs Benedict at a restaurant in New York City. While eating, the two overheard an argument at a neighboring table between a talent agent and an actor. According to Price and Stern, during the overheard argument, the actor said that he wanted to "ad-lib" an upcoming interview. The agent, who clearly disagreed with the actor's suggestion, retorted that ad-libbing an interview would be "mad". Stern and Price used that eavesdropped conversation to create, at length, the name "Mad Libs". In 1958, the duo released the first book of Mad Libs, which resembled the earlier games of consequences and exquisite corpse.

Stern was head writer and comedy director for The Steve Allen Show, and suggested to the show's host that guests be introduced using Mad Libs completed by the audience. Four days after an episode introduced "our guest NOUN, Bob Hope", bookstores sold out of Mad Libs books.

Stern and Price next partnered with Larry Sloan, a high school friend who was working as a publicist at the time, to continue publishing Mad Libs. Together, the three founded the publishing firm Price Stern Sloan in the early 1960s as a way to release Mad Libs. In addition to releasing more than 70 editions of Mad Libs under Sloan, the company also published 150 softcover books, including such notable titles as How to Be a Jewish Mother, first released in 1964; Droodles, which was also created by Roger Price; The VIP Desk Diary; and the series World's Worst Jokes.

Price died in 1990, and three years later, Sloan and Stern sold Price Stern Sloan, including Mad Libs, to the former Putnam Berkley Group, which is now known as Penguin Random House. Mad Libs books are still published by Penguin Random House; however, all references to Price Stern Sloan have been removed from the company's official website. Stern died at age 88 on June 7, 2011, and Sloan on October 14, 2012.

More than 110 million copies of Mad Libs have been sold since the game series was first published in 1958.

== Predecessors of Mad Libs ==
It is unclear whether the creators of Mad Libs were aware of existing games and books similar to their own. One such game is Revelations About My Friends, published anonymously by Fredrick A. Stokes Companies in New York in 1912. Like Mad Libs, the book invites the reader to choose words in various categories which then become part of a story. The nineteenth century parlor game "Consequences" is also similar to Mad Libs.

== Format ==
Mad Libs books contain short stories on each page with many key words replaced with blanks. Beneath each blank is specified a category, such as "noun", "verb", "number", "celebrity", "exclamation" or "part of the body". One player asks the other players, in turn, to contribute a word of the specified type for each blank, but without revealing the context for that word. Finally, the completed story is read aloud. The result is usually a comedic sentence.

Stern and Price's original Mad Libs book gives the following sentence as an example:

"___________!" he said ________ as he jumped into his convertible ______ and drove off with his _________ wife.
exclamation {} {} adverb {} {} {} {} {} {} noun {} {} {} {} {} adjective {}

After completion, they demonstrate that the sentence might read:

 "Ouch!" he said stupidly as he jumped into his convertible cat and drove off with his brave wife.

== Books ==
The following is a list of most Mad Libs books in alphabetical order:

- 100 Days of School Mad Libs Junior
- 70s Mad Libs
- 80s Mad Libs
- 90s Mad Libs
- A Very Mad Libs Christmas
- Ad Lib Mad Libs
- Adult Mad Libs
- Adult Mammoth Mad Libs
- Adventure Time Mad Libs
- Adventure Time Fionna & Cake Mad Libs
- Advice for the Lovelorn Mad Libs
- Aerosmith Mad Libs
- After School Mad Libs
- Aggretsuko Mad Libs
- All I Want for Christmas Is Mad Libs
- All-American Mad Libs
- All-Star Mad Libs
- Among Us Mad Libs
- America's Next Top Model Mad Libs
- American Dad! Mad Libs
- American Idol Mad Libs
- Angry Birds Mad Libs
- Animals, Animals, Animals! Mad Libs Junior
- Annie Mad Libs
- Archie Loves Betty and Veronica Mad Libs
- Around Town Mad Libs Junior
- Arrested Development Mad Libs
- Austin Powers Mad Libs
- Baby and All Mad Libs
- Baby on Board Mad Libs
- Baby Shower Mad Libs
- Bachelor Party Mad Libs
- Bachelorette Bash Mad Libs
- Barbie Mad Libs
- Batman Mad Libs
- Bee Movie Mad Libs
- Ben 10 Mad Libs
- Best of Mad Libs
- Betty and Veronica Mad Libs
- Billie Eilish Mad Libs
- Birthday Party Mad Libs
- Blonde Ambition Mad Libs
- Bob's Burgers Mad Libs
- Bob's Burgers Grand Re-Opening Mad Libs
- Booger Madness Mad Libs
- Brain Rot Mad Libs
- Broad City Mad Libs
- Broken News Mad Libs
- Buffy the Vampire Slayer Mad Libs
- BYO Mad Libs
- Camp Daze Mad Libs
- Can of Worms Mad Libs
- CANDY LAND Mad Libs Junior
- Cartoon Network Mad Libs
- Cartoon Network Cartoon Cartoons Mad Libs
- Casper Mad Libs
- Cats vs. Dogs Mad Libs
- Catwoman Mad Libs
- Charlie and the Chocolate Factory Mad Libs
- Christmas Cards Mad Libs
- Christmas Carol Mad Libs
- Christmas Cheer Mad Libs
- Christmas Fun Mad Libs
- Christmas Gift Mad Libs
- Christmas with the Golden Girls Mad Libs
- Clarence Mad Libs
- Club Penguin Mad Libs
- Clue Mad Libs
- Clueless Mad Libs
- Cool Mad Libs
- Countdown to Midnight Mad Libs
- County Fair Mad Libs
- Country Lovin' Mad Libs
- Craft Beer Mad Libs
- Crazy Crafting Mad Libs
- Critical Role Mad Libs
- Curious George Mad Libs
- Dance Mania Mad Libs
- Day of the Dead Mad Libs
- DC Comics Super Hero Mad Libs
- DC Super-Villains Mad Libs
- Dear Valentine Letters Mad Libs
- Deck the Halls Mad Libs
- Deck the Halls Mammoth Mad Libs
- Deep Sea Mad Libs
- Diary of a Wimpy Kid Mad Libs
- Diary of a Wimpy Kid Mad Libs: Second Helping
- Dinosaur Mad Libs
- Dinosaur Mad Libs Junior
- Dinosaur: Night of the Living Mad Libs
- Dirty Dancing Mad Libs
- Disney Princess Mad Libs
- Disney Villains Mad Libs
- Disneyland Mad Libs
- Diva Girl Mad Libs
- Doctor Who Mad Libs
- Doctor Who: Bigger on the Inside Edition Mad Libs
- Doctor Who Villains and Monsters Mad Libs
- Dog Ate My Mad Libs
- Don't Get Mad Libs, Get Even Funnier
- Dora the Explorer Mad Libs Junior
- Dora the Explorer My First Mad Libs
- Dude, Where's My Mad Libs?
- Dungeons & Dragons Mad Libs
- Dysfunctional Family Therapy Mad Libs
- Easter Basket Mad Libs
- Easter Eggstravaganza Mad Libs
- Edward Scissorhands Mad Libs
- Eid al-Fitr Mad Libs
- Election Day Mad Libs
- Emily the Strange Mad Libs
- Encanto Mad Libs
- Epic Mad Libs
- Escape from Detention Mad Libs
- Family Guy Mad Libs
- Family Tree Mad Libs
- Fear Factor Mad Libs
- Fear Factor Mad Libs: Ultimate Grossout!
- Feliz Navidad Mad Libs
- Field Trip Mad Libs
- Fingerlings Mad Libs Junior
- Finding Dory Mad Libs
- First Date Mad Libs
- First Day of Future School Mad Libs Comics
- First Day of School Mad Libs
- Flip, Sip, or Mad Libs
- Flipper Mad Libs
- Florida Georgia Line Mad Libs
- Flushed Away Mad Libs
- Foo Fighters Mad Libs
- Ford Mad Libs
- Fun in the Sun Mad Libs
- Futurama Mad Libs
- Frozen Mad Libs
- Frozen II Mad Libs Junior
- Game Over! Mad Libs
- Garfield Mad Libs
- Gender Reveal Party Mad Libs
- Get Inked Mad Libs
- Ghost Story Mad Libs
- Girls Just Wanna Have Mad Libs
- Give Me Liberty or Give Me Mad Libs
- Give My Regards to Mad Libs
- Go Big or Go Mad Libs: 10 Mad Libs in 1!
- Go, Diego, Go! My First Mad Libs
- Go for the Gold! Mad Libs
- Go Greek! Mad Libs
- Go Team! Mad Libs
- GOALLLLLL! Mad Libs
- Goat The Movie Mad Libs
- Gobble Gobble Mad Libs
- Godzilla Mad Libs
- Going for Mad Libs
- Gone Fishing Mad Libs
- Goofy Mad Libs
- Grab Bag Mad Libs
- Graduation Mad Libs
- Grand Slam Mad Libs
- Gravity Falls Mad Libs
- Greatest Grandma Mad Libs
- Greek Mythology Mad Libs
- Gross Me Out Mad Libs
- Groovy Mad Libs
- Gudetama Mad Libs
- Guinness World Records Mad Libs
- Halloween Mad Libs Junior
- Halloween Party Mad Libs
- Hanukkah Mad Libs
- Hatchimals Mad Libs Junior
- Happily Ever Mad Libs
- Happy Birthday Mad Libs
- Happy Diwali Mad Libs
- Happy Feet Mad Libs
- Happy Housewarming Mad Libs
- Happy Howl-o-ween Mad Libs
- Happy Kwanzaa Mad Libs
- Happy New Year Mad Libs
- Happy Valentine's Day! Love, Mad Libs
- Hatchimals Mad Libs Junior
- Haunted Mad Libs
- Haunted House Mad Libs
- Have a Batty Halloween! Mad Libs Junior Activity Book
- Have a Crazy Christmas! Mad Libs Junior Activity Book
- Have a Funny, Sunny Summer! Mad Libs Junior Activity Book
- Have a Silly Easter! Mad Libs Junior Activity Book
- Have Yourself a Merry Little Mad Libs: Stocking Stuffer Mad Libs
- He Loves Me, He Loves Me Not Mad Libs
- Hello Kitty Loves Mad Libs
- History of the World Mad Libs
- Ho, Ho, Ho! Merry Mad Libs!
- Hold Your Horses Mad Libs
- Holly, Jolly Mad Libs
- Home from School Mad Libs
- Home Run Mad Libs
- Home Sweet Home Mad Libs
- Horoscope Mad Libs
- Hot Off the Presses Mad Libs
- Hot Wheels Mad Libs
- How to Train Your Dragon Mad Libs
- iCarly Mad Libs
- I Love My Pet! Mad Libs Junior
- I Love Seattle Mad Libs
- I'm 10, Say It Again Mad Libs
- I'm 8, It's Great Mad Libs
- I'm 9, Everything's Fine Mad Libs
- I'm Grounded Mad Libs
- Ice Age: The Meltdown Mad Libs
- Impractical Jokers Mad Libs
- Indiana Jones Mad Libs
- Is Your Man a Catch? Mad Libs
- It's Not You, It's Mad Libs
- Jeopardy! Mad Libs
- JoJo Siwa Mad Libs
- Jumbo Jack-O'-Lantern Mad Libs: 4 Mad Libs in 1!
- Just Married Mad Libs
- Kama Sutra Mad Libs
- Keep It Curious, George Mad Libs
- Keep the Faith Mad Libs
- Keepers and Losers Mad Libs
- Kevin Keller Mad Libs
- Kid Libs Mad Libs
- Kim Possible Mad Libs
- Kiss Me, I'm Single Mad Libs
- Kool-Aid Mad Libs
- KPOP Demon Hunters Mad Libs
- Kung Fu Panda Mad Libs
- Kung Fu Panda 2 Mad Libs
- L.O.L. Surprise! Mad Libs
- LEGO Mad Libs
- LEGO Star Wars Mad Libs
- Letters from Camp Mad Libs
- Letters to Mom & Dad Mad Libs
- Like Father, Like Mad Libs
- Lime Green Mad Libs
- Llama Llama Mad Libs Junior
- Looney Tunes Mad Libs
- Log On to Mad Libs
- Lost and Found Mad Libs
- Love the Earth Mad Libs
- Luck of the Mad Libs
- Lunar New Year Mad Libs
- Lynyrd Skynyrd Mad Libs
- Mad About Animals Mad Libs
- Mad About Mad Libs
- Mad Libs 40th Anniversary Edition
- Mad Libs 50th Anniversary Edition
- Mad Libs After Dark
- Mad Libs for President
- Mad Libs: For the Fans: Beyoncé Edition
- Mad Libs: For the Fans: Billie Eilish Edition
- Mad Libs: For the Fans: BTS Edition
- Mad Libs: For the Fans: Caitlin Clark Edition
- Mad Libs: For the Fans: Harry Styles Edition
- Mad Libs: For the Fans: Olivia Rodrigo Edition
- Mad Libs: For the Fans: Taylor & Travis Edition
- Mad Libs: For the Fans: Taylor Swift Edition
- Mad Libs: For the Fans: Wicked Edition
- Mad Libs Forever
- Mad Libs from Outer Space
- Mad Libs in Love
- Mad Libs Mania
- Mad Libs Mixed-Up Coloring Book
- Mad Libs on the Road
- Mad Libs Super Summer Activity Book
- Mad Libs Survival Guide
- Mad Libs Wild, Wild Words Activity Book
- Mad Libs Workbook: Grade 1 Reading
- Mad Libs Workbook: Grade 2 Reading
- Mad Libs Workbook: Grade 3 Reading
- Mad Libs Workbook: Grade 4 Reading
- Mad Libs Workbook: Summer Activities
- Mad Mad Mad Mad Mad Libs
- Mad Scientist Mad Libs
- Mad, Madder, Maddest Mad Libs
- Madagascar Mad Libs
- Madagascar 3 Mad Libs
- Magic 8 Ball Mad Libs
- Mammoth Mad Libs: Deck the Halls
- Mammoth Mad Libs: Laugh Out Loud
- Mammoth Mad Libs: Monster Madness
- Mammoth Mad Libs: Summer Surprise
- Masters of the Universe Mad Libs
- Matilda Mad Libs
- Marvel's Avengers Mad Libs
- Marvel's The Fantastic Four Mad Libs
- Marvel's Guardians of the Galaxy Mad Libs
- Marvel's Spider-Man Mad Libs
- Massive Adult Mad Libs
- Masters of the Universe Mad Libs
- Mean Girls Mad Libs
- Medieval Mad Libs
- Mega Mad Libs
- Mega Mad Libs Celebrations
- Mega Mad Libs Forever
- Mega Mad Libs Junior
- Mega Mad Libs Party
- Mega Huge Cartoon Network Mad Libs
- Megamind Mad Libs
- Meow Libs
- Merry Christmas! Love, Mad Libs
- Merry Christmas! My First Mad Libs
- Merry Merry Mad Libs
- Mickey Mouse Mad Libs
- Minions Mad Libs
- Mitzvah Mad Libs
- MLB Mad Libs
- Mochi Monsters Mad Libs
- Modern Family Mad Libs
- Monopoly Mad Libs
- Monster Mad Libs
- Monster High Mad Libs
- Monster Mash Mad Libs
- Monsters vs. Aliens Mad Libs
- More Best of Mad Libs
- Mother Knows Mad Libs
- Mr. Bean's Holiday Mad Libs
- Mr. Men Little Miss Mad Libs
- Mr. Men Little Miss Christmas Mad Libs
- Much Ado About Mad Libs
- My Bleeping Family Mad Libs
- My Little Pony Mad Libs Junior
- Nancy Drew Mad Libs
- Napoleon Dynamite Mad Libs
- New Girl Mad Libs
- New York Yankees Mad Libs
- Nickelodeon Kids' Choice Awards Mad Libs Party Kit
- Nickelodeon: Nick 90s Mad Libs
- Night of the Living Mad Libs
- Nightmare at Camp Smelly Lake
- Ninjas Mad Libs
- No Pain, No Gain Mad Libs
- Nothing But Net Mad Libs
- Ode to Alcohol Mad Libs
- Off-the-Wall Mad Libs
- Olaf's Frozen Adventure Mad Libs
- Once Upon a Mad Libs Junior
- One PieceMad Libs
- Oops, I Burped Mad Libs
- Operation Mad Libs
- OutKast Mad Libs
- Over the Hedge Mad Libs
- Over the Hills Mad Libs
- P.S. I Love Mad Libs
- Parks and Recreation Mad Libs
- Party Game Mad Libs
- Party Girl Mad Libs
- Party Your (Blank) Off Box Set
- PAW Patrol Mad Libs Junior
- Peace, Love, and Mad Libs
- Peanuts Mad Libs
- Penguin Classics Mad Libs
- Percy Jackson Mad Libs
- Pet Parade Mad Libs: 4 Mad Libs in 1!
- Peter Rabbit Mad Libs Junior
- Peter Rabbit 2 Mad Libs Junior
- Pets-a-Palooza Mad Libs
- Pirates Mad Libs
- Pokémon Mad Libs
- Pokémon Battle Let's Go Mad Libs
- Pop Music Mad Libs
- Poptropica Mad Libs
- Presidential Mad Libs
- Pride Parade Mad Libs
- Prime-Time Mad Libs
- Ready, Set, Go! Mad Libs
- Regular Show Mad Libs
- Regular Show Holidaze Mad Libs
- Richard Simmons Mad Libs
- Rick and Morty Mad Libs
- Roald Dahl: The Witches Mad Libs
- Robot Chicken Mad Libs
- Rock 'n' Roll Mad Libs
- Ron's Gone Wrong Mad Libs
- Roses Are Red, Pickles Are Blue: An Original Mad Libs Love Story
- Royal Family Mad Libs
- RuPaul's Drag Race Mad Libs
- San Francisco Giants Mad Libs
- Santa Baby Mad Libs
- Scarface Mad Libs
- School Rules! Mad Libs Junior
- Scooby-Doo Mad Libs
- Scooby-Doo Mad Libs Junior
- Scooby-Doo 2: Monsters Unleashed Mad Libs
- Scooby-Doo Halloween Mad Libs
- Scooby-Doo Movie Mad Libs
- Scooby-Doo Mystery Mad Libs
- SEC Mad Libs
- Shark Attack! Mad Libs
- Shrek Mad Libs
- Shrek 2 Mad Libs
- Shrek Forever After Mad Libs
- Shrek the Third Mad Libs
- Shovel Knight Mad Libs
- Silly Siblings Mad Libs
- Skylanders Universe Mad Libs
- Slam Dunk Mad Libs
- Sleepover Party Mad Libs
- Snack Attack! Mad Libs Junior
- Snoop Dogg Mad Libs
- Snoopy Mad Libs
- Solar System Mad Libs
- Someecards Mad Libs
- Sonic the Hedgehog Mad Libs
- Sonic the Hedgehog: The Official Movie Mad Libs
- Sonic the Hedgehog: The Official Movie Mad Libs
- Sonic the Hedgehog: The Official Movie Mad Libs
- Son of Mad Libs
- Sooper Dooper Mad Libs
- Space Chimps Mad Libs
- Speed Racer Mad Libs
- SpongeBob SquarePants Mad Libs
- Sports Mad Libs Junior
- Sports Star Mad Libs Junior
- Spooky Mad Libs
- Spring Break! Mad Libs
- Spy Mad Libs
- Star Trek Mad Libs
- Star Wars Mad Libs
- Star Wars Droids Mad Libs
- Star Wars: The Clone Wars Mad Libs
- Star Wars: The Force Awakens Mad Libs
- Stewie and Brian's Family Guy Mad Libs
- Steven Universe Mad Libs
- Stocking Stuffer Mad Libs
- Stoned Off Our Mad Libs
- Straight "A" Mad Libs
- Stranger Things Mad Libs
- Summer Camp Mad Libs Junior
- Summer Fun Mad Libs Junior
- Super Silly Mad Libs Junior
- Supersize Mad Libs
- Survivor Mad Libs
- Tailgating Mad Libs
- Teachers Rule! Mad Libs
- Teen Titans Mad Libs
- Teen Titans Go! Mad Libs
- Teenage Mutant Ninja Turtles Mad Libs
- Teenage Mutant Ninja Turtles Mad Libs Junior
- Test Your Relationship IQ Mad Libs
- The Amazing World of Gumball Mad Libs
- The Apprentice Mad Libs
- The Backyardigans My First Mad Libs
- The BFG Mad Libs
- The Big Bang Theory Mad Libs
- The Case of the Missing DUMPLING
- The Electric Company Mad Libs
- The Golden Girls Mad Libs
- The Grinch Mad Libs
- The Incredible Hulk Mad Libs
- The Incredibles Mad Libs
- The Last Airbender Mad Libs
- The Last Kids on Earth Mad Libs
- The Mad Libs Silly, Hilariously Funny, Belly-Busting Joke Book
- The Maddest of Mad Libs
- The Muppets Mad Libs
- The Naked Brothers Band Mad Libs
- The Office Mad Libs
- The Original #1 Mad Libs
- The Penguins of Madagascar Mad Libs
- The Powerpuff Girls Mad Libs
- The Simpsons Mad Libs
- The Wizard of Oz Mad Libs
- The World of Roald Dahl Mad Libs
- Time Travel Mad Libs
- Total Divas Mad Libs
- Total Mess Mad Libs
- Total Nightmare Mad Libs
- Totally Pink Mad Libs
- Touchdown Mad Libs
- Toy Story Mad Libs
- Trains, Trains, Trains! My First Mad Libs
- Transformers: BotBots Mad Libs
- Travel Far and Mad Libs
- Trick or Treat Mad Libs
- Trolls Mad Libs
- Try Not to Laugh Mad Libs
- Turkey Time Mad Libs
- Uc the Onion Mad Libs
- Uncle Grandpa Mad Libs
- Undead Mad Libs
- Under the Sea Mad Libs Junior
- Unicorns, Mermaids, and Mad Libs
- Unidentified Flying Mad Libs
- United States of Mad Libs
- Up in the Air Mad Libs
- Upside Down Mad Libs
- Urban Dictionary Mad Libs
- Vacation Fun Mad Libs
- Valentine's Day Mad Libs
- Vampire Academy Mad Libs
- We Bare Bears Mad Libs
- We Wish You a Merry Mad Libs
- Wednesday Mad Libs
- Wendy's Kids' Meal Mad Libs
- We're Here, We're Queer, We're Mad Libs
- Wheel of Fortune Mad Libs
- Who Moved My Cubicle? Mad Libs
- Who Was? Mad Libs
- Winter Games Mad Libs
- Wonder Woman Mad Libs
- Wonka: The Official Movie Mad Libs
- Workaholics Mad Libs
- WWE Mad Libs
- Worst-Case Scenario: Survival Handbook Mad Libs
- Worst-Case Scenario 2: Survival Handbook Mad Libs
- Worst-Case Scenario Survival Handbook: Travel
- Worst-Case Scenario Survival Handbook: Holidays
- Would You Rather Mad Libs
- Wu-Tang Clan Mad Libs
- WWE Mad Libs
- You're on Your Way!: An Original Mad Libs Adventure
- You've Got Mad Libs
- Zoey 101 Mad Libs

== Other media ==
A game show called Mad Libs, with some connections to the game, aired on the Disney Channel in 1998 and 1999.

Several imitations of Mad Libs have been created, most of them online. Imitation Mad Libs are sometimes used in educational settings to help teach kids the parts of speech.

A stage adaptation called Mad Libs Live! with music by Jeff Thomson and book and lyrics by Robin Rothstein premiered off-Broadway at New World Stages from November 2nd, 2015 to January 3rd, 2016. The show, which is now available for licensing, features audience participation to fill in "missing words" from each song.

Looney Labs released Mad Libs: The Game, a card game, in 2016. There is also a Mad Libs mobile app.

== See also ==
- Snowclone
- Phrasal template
- Cloze test
- Consequences (game)
- Exquisite corpse
- Cards Against Humanity
