= Run, Buddy, Run =

American television sitcom (1966–67)

- Genre: Sitcom
- Created by: Leonard B. Stern
- Starring: Jack Sheldon; Bruce Gordon
- Composer: Jerry Fielding
- Country of origin: United States
- Original language: English
- No. of seasons: 1
- No. of episodes: 16

Production
- Producer: Leonard B. Stern
- Camera setup: Single-camera
- Running time: 30 minutes per episode
- Production company: Talent Associates

Original release
- Network: CBS
- Release: September 12, 1966 – January 2, 1967

Run, Buddy, Run is an American sitcom TV series that aired on CBS for one season of 16 episodes in 1966-1967. The series was created by Leonard B. Stern, and starred jazz trumpeter, singer, and actor Jack Sheldon.

== Description ==
At a steambath, accountant Buddy Overstreet (Sheldon) overhears gangster “Mr. D” (Bruce Gordon) plotting a murder. Mr. D and his mob realize that Buddy is a potential witness, and pursue him across the country.

The series was essentially a comedic version of The Fugitive. It was cancelled by CBS after airing 16 episodes.

== Episodes ==
No.	Title	Directed by	Written by	Original release date	Prod. code
1	"Steam Bath & Chicken Little"	Leonard B. Stern	Mel Tolkin & Ernie Chambers	September 12, 1966	0811
In the pilot episode, Buddy Overstreet is in a steambath and overhears a murder plot. Once he's spotted, the hoods set out to eliminate their witness.
2	"Wild Wild Wake"	Gene Reynolds	William Raynor & Myles Wilder	September 19, 1966	0813
Hitchhiking through a small town, Buddy spots the gangsters who are chasing him. For safety, he asks the local sheriff to arrest him.
3	"Win, Place and Die"	Gene Reynolds	William Raynor & Myles Wilder	September 26, 1966	0814
Buddy hides out at a race track.
4	"Down on the Farm"	Gary Nelson	Ray Singer	October 3, 1966	0812
Buddy hides out as a farmhand.
5	"Grand Mexican Hotel"	Gary Nelson	Budd Grossman	October 10, 1966	0815
Buddy hides out at a Mexican hotel -- then Mr. D and his goons check in.
6	"The Death of Buddy Overstreet"	Gary Nelson	William Raynor & Myles Wilder	October 17, 1966	0816
To escape his pursuers once and for all, Buddy fakes his own death.
7	"The Bank Holdup"	Jack Arnold	Budd Grossman	October 24, 1966	0817
Fleeing his pursuers, Buddy collides with a gang of bank robbers.
8	"I Want a Piece of That Boy"	Joshua Shelley	Bill Freedman & Ben Gershman	October 31, 1966	0819
Buddy hides out as a boxer -- and kayos an opponent who is owned by Mr. D.
9	"Buddy Overstreet, Forgive Me"	Bruce Bilson	Budd Grossman	November 7, 1966	0818
Devere thinks he's dying, and wants to mend fences with Buddy.
10	"Mr. D's Revenge"	Unknown	Unknown	November 14, 1966	0820
Devere constructs an ingenious plan to catch Buddy.
11	"Goodbye, Wendell"	Unknown	Unknown	November 21, 1966	0821
Devere's henchman Wendell has disappeared.
12	"The Sky is Falling"	Unknown	Unknown	November 28, 1966	0822
Buddy overhears yet another part of Mr. D's plot.
13	"Death with Father: Part 1"	Gene Reynolds	William Raynor & Myles Wilder	December 5, 1966	0823
Buddy loses his memory, and is kidnapped by Devere's mob rivals.
14	"Death with Father: Part 2"	Gene Reynolds	William Raynor & Myles Wilder	December 12, 1966	0824
The rival mob wants to know why Devere is chasing Buddy -- but Buddy can't remember.
15	"The Runaway Kid"	Bruce Bilson	Irving Elinson & Elon Packard	December 26, 1966	0825
Buddy has to choose between escaping the mob and helping an orphan kid.
16	"Buddy Overstreet, Please Come Home"	Unknown	Unknown	January 2, 1967	0829
Devere has bigger problems than chasing Buddy, and lets Buddy know he's free.
?	"Buddy, the Lifesaver"	Bruce Bilson	Jack Elinson & Norman Paul	TBA	0827
Buddy hides out at the beach.
?	"Killer Cassidy"	TBA	TBA	TBA	0830
Devere hires a contract killer to eliminate Buddy.
?	"My Son, the Killer"	Bruce Bilson	William Raynor & Myles Wilder	TBA	0832
Devere's son tries to prove himself to his dad by killing Buddy.

== Merchandising ==
The TV series was adapted into a comic book distributed by Gold Key Comics. Only one issue was published.
