= Three on a Date =

1978 American film

- Genre: Comedy; Romance
- Based on: Three on a Date by Stephanie Buffington
- Screenplay by: Michael Norell; Stanley Ralph Ross
- Story by: Dale McRaven
- Directed by: Bill Bixby
- Starring: June Allyson; Ray Bolger; John Byner; Didi Conn; Carol Lawrence; Meredith MacRae; Rick Nelson; Patrick Wayne
- Music by: George Tipton
- Country of origin: United States
- Original language: English

Production
- Executive producers: Danny Thomas; Ronald Jacobs
- Producer: David Shapiro
- Cinematography: Charles W. Short
- Editors: Tom Stevens; Jack McSweeney; Michael Karr
- Running time: 100 minutes
- Production company: ABC Circle Films

Original release
- Network: ABC
- Release: February 17, 1978

Three on a Date is a 1978 American made-for-television romantic comedy film directed by Bill Bixby. This movie-of-the-week premiered on ABC on February 17, 1978.

== Premise ==
Four couples are winners on a dating show.

== Cast ==
(in alphabetical order)

- June Allyson: Marge Emery
- Loni Anderson: Angela Ross
- Ray Bolger: Andrew
- John Byner: Donald Lumis
- Didi Conn: Eve Harris
- Gary Crosby: Leonard
- Geoff Edwards: Emcee
- Carol Lawrence: Joan
- Meredith MacRae: Valerie Owens
- Rick Nelson: Bob Oakes
- Patrick Wayne: Roger Powell
- Introducing Forbesy Russell as Stephanie Barrington

Guest Stars

- James Hampton: Ernest
- Howard T. Platt: Frank
- Richard Libertini: Gabe
- And Branscombe Richmond as Allen Lunalilo

Co-Starring

- Joe Maross as Warren
- Pat Renella as Bobby
- Byron Webster as Mr. Plews
- John Dorsey as Himself

Featuring

- Nancy Cameron as Contestant
- Bob Cummings as Cab Driver
- Dana House as Contestant
- Harlee McBride as Model #1
- Denise Michele as Woman
- Stanley Ralph Ross as Al
- Bonwitt St. Claire as Contestant
- Debra Svensk as Beach Girl
- Sondra Theodore as Model #2
- Cynthia Wood as Stewardess

Uncredited

- Danny Thomas: Man at airport
- Gregory Barnett: Bachelor #3
- Tracey Bregman: Contestant

== Production ==
It was co produced by Danny Thomas.

== Reception ==
The Los Angeles Times called it "a distinct and pleasant surprise".
