= Braingames (1983 TV series) =

- Braingames title card
- Created by: Sheila Nevins
- Country of origin: United States
- No. of episodes: 6

Production
- Running time: 25 minutes
- Production companies: Eliot Noyes Productions (pilot); Home Box Office

Original release
- Network: HBO
- Release: November 8, 1983 – December 22, 1985

Braingames is an American educational program shown on HBO in the mid-1980s. It was a half-hour program consisting of brain-teasing animated skits (either stop-motion or cartoon) designed to make the viewers think. It was HBO's first attempt at a show focused on educational skits, predating Crashbox by 15 years.

== Episodes ==
The series pilot was aired in 1983 (featuring a female Sphinx in the intro), with another five episodes (this time with a gentleman with an egg for a head) made in 1984-1985 with new games and a few brought back from the pilot. After that, an episode called "The Best of Braingames" was made which had five of the best Braingames games from episodes 1, 3, and 4, plus a special episode of "The Riddler" (see below) where Chuck Roast read off the winners of a contest for "The Absitively Posolutely Worst Riddles in America". All the episodes in the series ends with a sad and crying voice saying, "Braingames...is now...over." On the "Best of" episode, an equally sad voice says, "The Best of Braingames...is now...over.".

Although full episodes have not been shown in years, HBO has occasionally shown single games between programs in the late 1980s-mid-1990s.

In 1996-2000, full episodes were later shown occasionally each month on HBO Family.

== Games ==
The following is a list of the different games played on the various shows:

- Earplay – From both the original episode and played on two of the later episodes, this consisted of 5 different sounds being made. First the viewer simply heard the sound for about 15 seconds, then the sound would be rewound and replayed, this time with the corresponding video footage. (NOTE: In all three showings, at least one of the sounds was an arcade game.)
- Digitville – Here, we visit a town where the entire population consists of people and pets whose heads are actually items that use numbers (clocks, dice, thermometers, rulers, etc.) (although one dog had a ruler for a body), and they come up with number games for us to play. This was played on two of the newer episodes. Produced by Jerry Lieberman.
- Faces/Whosamawhatchamacallits – Faces was on the first episode, then Whosamawhatchamacallits was the game on the next 4 episodes. The two games were similar, showing initially a distorted image, while the voice gives clues until the image is clear. Each one started with a superhero and ended with a monster, aside from the "Faces" prototype, which ended with Dracula but began with the Mona Lisa, as well as the last of the "Whosamawhatchamacallits", which was bookended by two superheroes; Spider-Man and The Incredible Hulk. In the "Faces" prototype, one distorted image has an illustrated cameo of two Fraggles (Red and Mokey).
- Tales of Wrongovia – Essentially an anachronism quiz, this segment goes back into history, where a historical person is faced with a dilemma. Each dilemma involves showing four different items that would all be useful for the person in question, but in all but two, one of the items wasn't available to them at the time. (In the other two, only one of the four items was available.) It's the job of the viewer to guess which one couldn't (or, in the case of the other two, could) be used. Produced by Michael Sporn.
- The Riddler – Chuck Roast hosts a game full of riddles. Produced by Joey Ahlbum.
- Memory Rock/Workout – Four people are shown either in a rock band or exercising, and questions are asked that involve how many of them are of a specific way (either what they are wearing or what they are doing). Both of them asked a question where the answer was "none". In "Rock", the final question had nothing to do with numbers but was what the name of the song they were singing ("My Boyfriend"), and in "Workout", the final question had nothing to do with the people exercising, but with the piano player. (How many rings was he wearing on his hands.).
- Odd Card Out/Safari Solitaire – The original episode had Odd Card Out, and the subsequent episodes had Safari Solitaire. The idea was that four cards were dealt with different pictures, but one was set apart from the rest based on the question asked. Odd Card Out was based on numerous things, but Safari Solitaire was specifically geared towards animals (and occasionally humans). Produced by Stan Smith.
- Uninvited Guests – Groups of four people who look like they belong together come into a very upscale party, but one doesn't belong. It is later revealed which one is uninvited.
- Eyewitness – A man goes in and quietly robs a bank. Then 6 hours later, four suspects are caught and the viewers must guess which one was the robber while remembering that only certain things can naturally be changed on a person in a 6-hour time span and that nothing on the suspects is fake (no putty, makeup, wigs, or fake facial hair). Produced by Michael Sporn.
- Museum Mis~~s~~takes – This segment is set in a museum and every picture shown includes something out of the ordinary. One picture (Jan Steen's "The Feast of Saint Nicholas") featured an animated cameo of the Cookie Monster from Sesame Street.
- Eyeball Twisters – Things are shown so close-up so as to not be able to tell what they are immediately. Meanwhile, a voice-over gives clues until the object is revealed.
- Read Between the Lines – Essentially a rebus puzzle, in which the voice over tells a story, then pauses as a word puzzle is displayed, and the viewer has to guess what it means. For example, "I right I" would mean "right between the eyes".
- Lloofbat/Aceps Gevoya/Splatnarnt/Mane Tath Storp – Four different games which involved unscrambling words associated with the theme, which was also scrambled. Lloofbat (football) was all things regarding a typical football game as it is played. Aceps Gevoya (space voyage) involved things an alien named BLT runs into as he makes his way home after spending quite an amount of time exploring space. This segment was produced by Janet Perlman. Splatnarnt (transplant), which was produced by Fred Garbers, involved a mad scientist, Dr. Gibberish, and his female assistant, Nurse Feverish, creating a monster, as the viewers unscramble inner parts of the body. Mane Tath Storp (name that sport), which was produced by Bill Davis, appeared in game-show format, in which different contestants have a sport described to them. Both they, and the viewer, have to unscramble its name. After each segment, the voice-over summed up the previous action with the key words back in their scrambled states. Additionally, in the episodes in which they appeared, they were the final game of the show. Splatnarnt was directed by Fred Garbers, and Mane Tath Storp was directed by Bill Davis.
- Unidentified Flying Pranksters – A group of wild aliens come to a typical town and changes one minor detail from what was originally seen. The viewers must guess what they did. Produced by John Canemaker.
- Ze Inspector and Ze Lost Princess – This segment involved an inspector reading a letter to find a princess; the letter was actually a rebus puzzle. Produced by Bill Davis.
- Aliens – A viewer must find one of the four pixelated aliens that doesn't belong. There were four kinds of aliens shown in the pilot: Pink dog-like glugs, blue cat-like warks, red bird-like swoops and green bug-like murps.
- Mysteriosos – A game involving droodles that the viewer must guess, similar in appearance to "The Riddler". Produced by Joey Ahlbum.

== Home media ==
The series was released over three VHS videotapes in the 1980s and 1990s.
