= Patricia McClain =

American model (born 1954)

Playboy centerfold appearance
- May 1976
- Preceded by: Denise Michele
- Succeeded by: Debra Peterson

Personal details
- Born: May 3, 1954 (age 71); Long Beach, California, United States
- Height: 5 ft 8 in (1.73 m)

Patricia Margot McClain (born May 3, 1954) is an American model. She was born in Long Beach, California, and became Playboy magazine's Playmate of the Month for its May 1976 issue. Her centerfold was photographed by Ken Marcus.

In 1996, McClain's firing from her office manager job at a pest extermination company made national news. When she was first hired, she disclosed her playmate past to her employers and was told to keep quiet about it to her co-workers due to the company's sexual harassment policy. She was fired one month after Playboy published the book, Playboy Magazine: Five Decades of Centerfolds. Her lawsuit gained much media attention including segments on Dateline and American Journal, and the lawsuit was settled for an undisclosed sum. After the firing, she worked for Playboy in their editing department and took the occasional modeling gig.

In 1999 she wanted to challenge Elton Gallegly in the Republican primary in his Ventura County district for the following year. During the campaign, she was quoted about her Playboy past, "They took advantage of me with $15,000. That's what I tell the feminists. It was a growing-up thing, and it was also a little girl's dream." Republican activists dissuaded her, and asked her to explore challenging Democratic Congressman Bob Filner in his San Diego district instead. The plan fell through due to the gauged lack of interest and logistics of her having to move from her Oxnard home to San Diego and find employment.

Daina House	Laura Lyons	Ann Pennington	Denise Michele	Patricia McClain	Debra Peterson
Deborah Borkman	Linda Beatty	Whitney Kaine	Hope Olson	Patti McGuire	Karen Hafter
