= The Little Dragons =

1980 film by Curtis Hanson

- Theatrical release poster
- Directed by: Curtis Hanson
- Written by: Harvey Applebaum; Louis G. Atlee; Rudolph Borchert; Alan Ormsby
- Produced by: Hannah Hempstead; Curtis Hanson
- Starring: Charles Lane; Ann Sothern; Chris Petersen; Pat Petersen; Sally Boyden
- Cinematography: Stephen Katz
- Edited by: Ronald Sinclair
- Music by: Ken Lauber
- Production company: Eastwind Productions
- Distributed by: Aurora Film Corporation
- Release date: July 18, 1980
- Running time: 90 minutes
- Country: United States
- Language: English

The Little Dragons (also known as Karate Kids U.S.A. or simply Karate Kids) is a 1980 American martial arts film directed and produced by Curtis Hanson, about two young brothers who use their karate skills to rescue a friend after she is held captive for ransom. It stars Charles Lane, Ann Sothern, Chris Petersen and Pat Petersen.

== Plot ==
Brothers Zack and Woody are young karate students who embark on a weekend camping trip with their grandfather J.J. Along the way they meet a new friend, Carol Forbinger and her parents.

The Forbinger family encounters a tough-talking backwoods mother and her two bumbling sons. The backwoods family decides to hold Carol captive, in the belief that they can collect a sizeable ransom. The "karate kids" must find a way to use their martial arts skills to rescue the Forbinger girl with a little help from their grandfather and some new friends they meet along the way.

== Cast ==
- Charles Lane as J.J.
- Ann Sothern as Angel
- Chris Petersen as Zack
- Pat Petersen as Woody
- Sally Boyden as Carol Forbinger
- Rick Lenz as Dick Forbinger
- Sharon Clark as Ruth Forbinger
- Joe Spinell as Yancey
- John Davis Chandler as Carl
- Clifford A. Pellow as Sheriff
- Stephen Young as Lunsford
- Pat E. Johnson as Karate Instructor
- Bong Soo Han as Karate Master
- Donnie Williams as Motorcycle Leader
- Tony Bill as Niles

== Production ==
Director Curtis Hanson was hired, in part of what he referred to as his "chequered early career."

The film stars the Petersen brothers, Chris (born in 1963), and Pat (born in 1966). Casting included Charles Lane, a "sharp-featured character actor... one of the most familiar faces in film... though he is one of those ubiquitous players, whose name is known to only a few." Pat E. Johnson was the film's fight choreographer.

Copyright on the script was filed in May 1978. The film was shot in the summer of 1978. As of that October, the film was scheduled for release "this Christmas." However, for unknown reasons, its release was delayed until July 1980.

== Release ==
The film was released gradually, from 1980 to 1981, initially with a roadshow and later with mildly wider releases:

- Arizona by July,
- Missouri and Louisiana by August,
- Texas and South Carolina by September.
- October 1980: Connecticut, Massachusetts, New Hampshire
- November 1980: Corpus Christi, Texas
- May 1981: Tallahassee, Florida
- June 1981: Indianapolis, Indiana
- October 1981: Victoria, Texas

The film's original release advertising included the tagline "Karate Kids to the Rescue!!!"

The film aired on American television, Showtime, and Canadian television by 1981. The film would eventually air on The Disney Channel.

=== Home media ===
The Little Dragons was released on Beta and VHS home video by Active Home Video, in 1984. As The Karate Kid was released in June 1984, the packaging continued to use the tag line: "The karate kids to the rescue!" The film was later re-released on VHS by Magnum Video in 1991, this time retitled as "Karate Kids U.S.A.". Subsequent DVD releases in the U.K. and the U.S. used shortened versions of both titles, retitled simply as "Dragons" and "Karate Kids" using the tag line: "Before the Karate Kid, there was The Karate Kids!"; however, the most recent 2009 Music Video Distributors DVD has been released under the film's original title, "The Little Dragons" this time with the tag line: "Meet the REAL Karate Kids...".

Although intended to be a "family film", by the time of the first VHS release in 1984, some of the language used by the children in the film was deemed inappropriate for a young audience, and was "cleaned up" for the 1984 Active Home Video VHS release. The Petersen brothers having grown too old to re-dub their childhood voices, the decision was made to simply remove the "offending" dialogue altogether, resulting in the actors' mouths moving, but without the audio.

== Reception ==
A critic at the Abilene Reporter-News preferred the demonstration of a local karate school to the film itself. She shared that it held the attention of few kids in the theatre, with "stilted acting," saving most of the "good stuff" until the end. "The adult actors and actresses act in the same listless manner," as the child actors. "Even veteran actress Ann Southern, the only big name in the movie, looks bored as she sleepwalks through a role as a fat, sloppy-looking moll."

Variety wrote "A rather lackadaisical, if amiable, suspenser clearly intended a palatable antidote to more violent action fare, The Little Dragons might be more at home on the tube than on theatre screens... a stronger script and deeper characterizations could have broadened its audience." A book from the same publication dubbed it "a watered-down Deliverance, with moppets but sans river, a chipper yet hopelessly dated story."
