= Price Stern Sloan =

Publisher (now an imprint of the Penguin Group)

- Status: Defunct, assets now owned by Penguin Random House
- Founder: Roger Price, Leonard Stern and Larry Sloan
- Country of origin: United States
- Headquarters location: Los Angeles
- Publication types: Books
- Nonfiction topics: novelty
- Official website: www.penguinrandomhouse.com

Price Stern Sloan (originally known as Price/Stern/Sloan) or PSS! was a publisher (now an imprint of Penguin Random House) that was founded in Los Angeles in the early 1960s to publish the Mad Libs that Roger Price and Leonard Stern had concocted during their stint as writers for Tonight Starring Steve Allen and also the Droodles. Along with their partner Larry Sloan, they expanded the company into children's books, novelty formats, and humor. Some of the books they published include movie tie-ins for films such as Happy Feet, Wallace and Gromit, Catwoman, and Elf, How to Be a Jewish Mother (1964), and other properties such as Serendipity, Mr. Men and Little Miss and Wee Sing. Today, PSS! still publishes approximately ten Mad Libs books a year. Mr. Stern and Mr. Sloan went on to found Tallfellow Press in Los Angeles.

In 1986, Price Stern Sloan had inked a video agreement with MCA Home Video for distribution of PSS titles the company was planning on to produce, and the first two productions would budget it for the $100,000 range and the deal was handling for three years, handling worldwide rights to the Price Stern Sloan projects.

The Putnam Publishing Group (now the Penguin Group, and now part of Penguin Random House) bought Price Stern Sloan in 1993, and in 1997 the headquarters were moved to New York. Though Penguin Random House still publishes titles that used to be published by Price Stern Sloan, they no longer use Price Stern Sloan as an imprint.
