= Leonard B. Stern =

American screenwriter (1922–2011)

- Born: Leonard Bernard Stern; December 23, 1922; New York City, U.S.
- Died: June 7, 2011 (aged 88); Beverly Hills, California, U.S.
- Occupations: Publisher, director, writer, producer
- Years active: 1949–2000
- Spouses: Julie Adams (m. 1951; div. 1953) Gloria Stroock (m. 1956)
- Children: 2

Leonard Bernard Stern (December 23, 1922 – June 7, 2011) was an American screenwriter, film and television producer, director, and one of the creators, with Roger Price, of the word game Mad Libs. He received screen credit as Leonard Stern or Leonard B. Stern (or in one instance, under the pseudonym Max Adams).

== Life and career ==
Stern was born in New York City and majored in journalism at New York University. He was a Women's Army Corps recruiter while serving in the Army during World War II.

== Screenwriter ==
Early in his career, Stern wrote in partnership with Martin Ragaway, a staff writer for Abbott and Costello's radio show. In 1949, Abbott and Costello made their own independent feature film, Africa Screams, with Stern and Ragaway contributing to the script without screen credit. This led Stern to the comedy team's home studio, Universal Pictures, where he and Ragaway wrote screenplays for the studio's popular comedies with Abbott and Costello, Ma and Pa Kettle, and Donald O'Connor. While at Universal, Stern met and married one of the studio's rising starlets, Julie Adams.

In late 1950 and early 1951, Stern was between assignments and had trouble finding work. He finally got an assignment at Monogram Pictures, an unpretentious but unprestigious "budget" studio, where he wrote a military comedy for The Bowery Boys, Let's Go Navy! (1951). Stern adopted the pseudonym "Max Adams" because he "wasn't particularly proud of doing a Bowery Boys." When the film earned rave reviews as one of the funniest in the series, Stern spread the word to producers and agents: "I'm Max Adams! I'm Max Adams!" Stern contributed to another Bowery Boys comedy under the Max Adams pen name, this time without screen credit: Crazy Over Horses (1951).

Stern collaborated on the screenplay for the 1952 Danny Thomas and Peggy Lee version of The Jazz Singer.

== Television ==
In 1953, Jackie Gleason hired Stern to write for his weekly television comedy-variety show. In accepting the job, Stern had to move to New York City, where Gleason was based. When Gleason began production of The Honeymooners, Stern wrote many of the scripts. Stern's relocation may have been a factor in the dissolution of his marriage; Julie Adams was now being groomed by Universal as one of the studio's major personalities, and she may have been reluctant to forsake her screen career and salary. In any event, Stern and his wife divorced in 1953.

Leonard Stern became part of the New York TV-production scene and went on to work for Phil Silvers and Steve Allen. He remained with Allen for five years.

Stern created I'm Dickens, He's Fenster (1962–1963), starring John Astin and Marty Ingels as two trouble-prone carpenters. Some reviews compared the slapstick situations of Dickens and Fenster to those of Laurel and Hardy. Stern said that he received a fan letter from Stan Laurel and that Laurel said that the program "was the only TV show he watched." Laurel and Stern became friendly, and Laurel contributed many of his own visual gags and situations. The series aired on the third-place ABC network and was scheduled opposite the hit shows Route 66 and Sing Along with Mitch. When those programs went into reruns, viewers turned to Dickens and Fenster, and the show's ratings improved. Unfortunately for Stern, by the time the show became a hit, the network had already canceled it. ABC salvaged its mistake by sending the 32 episodes into syndication immediately, and local TV stations continued the show's run.

Stern continued working in television, conceiving many clever but short-lived projects: the game show Supermarket Sweep (1965), Run, Buddy, Run (1966), The Hero (1966–1967) and He & She (1967–1968); the latter earned critical acclaim and an Emmy Award despite a short TV run.

One breakout hit was Get Smart, for which Stern served as writer and executive producer. The zany parody of then-popular secret agent stories was created by Mel Brooks and Buck Henry. Stern created the signature opening door credits for Get Smart.

In the 1970s, Stern produced and directed the TV series McMillan & Wife, which starred Rock Hudson and Susan Saint James. In 1979, he directed and co-wrote Just You and Me, Kid, a comedy feature film starring George Burns and Brooke Shields.

== Print media ==
Stern was the senior vice president of Price Stern Sloan, which created and published the comedy successes Mad Libs and Droodles. In 2000, after Roger Price's death, surviving partners Stern and Larry Sloan launched another publishing company, Tallfellow Press, and acquired the rights to Droodles. Stern co-wrote, with Diane L. Robison, A Martian Wouldn't Say That (2000), a compilation of actual memos and notes from television executives.

== Personal life ==
Stern was married twice. He married Julie Adams in 1951; the marriage ended in divorce two years later. In 1956, Stern married actress Gloria Stroock, to whom he remained married until his death. The couple had two children, Kate and Michael.

== Last years ==
Stern's last professional project was reviving I'm Dickens, He's Fenster. In 2006 he found that the original 35mm film negatives had been languishing in a film-storage warehouse. He reclaimed them, hoping that new audiences would finally give the series the recognition it deserved. A DVD set was released on April 24, 2012, but Stern did not live to see it.

On June 7, 2011, Stern died of heart failure at his home in Beverly Hills, California, aged 88. He was survived by his wife of 55 years, actress Gloria Stroock, as well as a son, daughter, two grandchildren, and a great-granddaughter. Funeral services were held at Mount Sinai Memorial Park.

== Selected film and television credits ==
Producer

- I'm Dickens, He's Fenster (1962–1963)
- Supermarket Sweep (1965)
- Get Smart (1965–1968)
- Run, Buddy, Run (1966)
- The Hero (1966–1967)
- He & She (1967–1968)
- The Good Guys (1968–1970)
- The Governor & J.J. (1969–1970)
- McMillan & Wife (1971–1976)
- The Snoop Sisters (1972–1974)
- Faraday & Company (1973)
- Holmes & Yoyo (1976–1977)
- Lanigan's Rabbi (1976)
- Rosetti and Ryan (1977)
- Operation Petticoat (1977–1978)
- Partners in Crime (1984)
- Get Smart, Again! (1989)
- Missing Pieces (1991)

Writer

- Africa Screams (1949) uncredited, with Martin Ragaway
- Ma and Pa Kettle Go to Town (1950) with Martin Ragaway
- Abbott and Costello in the Foreign Legion (1950) with Martin Ragaway
- Let's Go Navy! (1951) (as Max Adams)
- The Milkman (1952) with Martin Ragaway
- Ma and Pa Kettle at the Fair (1952) with Martin Ragaway
- Lost in Alaska (1952) with Martin Ragaway
- The Jazz Singer (1952)
- The Jackie Gleason Show (1953–1956)
- Three for the Show (1955)
- The Honeymooners (1955–1956)
- The Phil Silvers Show (1956)
- The Steve Allen Show (1956–1960)
- The Good Guys (1968)

Director

- I'm Dickens, He's Fenster (1962–1963)
- Run, Buddy, Run (1966)
- He & She (1967)
- The Good Guys (1968)
- The Governor & J.J. (1969)
- McMillan & Wife (1971)
- The Snoop Sisters (1972)
- Holmes & Yoyo (1976)
- Lanigan's Rabbi (1977)
- Just You and Me, Kid (1979)
- Partners in Crime (1984)
- Missing Pieces (1991)

== Awards ==
- Emmy Award, 1957, Best Comedy Writing-variety Or Situation Comedy (The Phil Silvers Show)
- Emmy Award, 1967, Outstanding Writing Achievement In Comedy (Get Smart)
