= Consequences (game) =

Parlour game

Consequences is an old parlour game in a similar vein to Mad Libs and the surrealist game exquisite corpse.

Each player is given a sheet of paper, and all are told to write down a word or phrase to fit a description ("an animal"), optionally with some extra words to make the story. Each player then folds the paper over to hide the most recent line, and hands it to the next person. At the end of the game, the stories are read out.

== Example game ==
The exact sequence varies, but an example sequence given in Everyman's Word Games is:

1. An adjective
2. A man's name
3. The word met followed by an adjective
4. A woman's name
5. The word at followed by where they met
6. The word to followed by what they went there for
7. The words he wore followed by what he wore
8. The words she wore followed by what she wore
9. What he did
10. What she did
11. The words and the consequence was followed by details of what happened as a result
12. The words and the world said followed by what it said

The same reference book gives the following example of a completed story:

Mediocre Joe met transparent Kim at the bowling alley, to dig for gold.
He wore a seafoam green leisure suit.
She wore a sandwich board.
He poured a martini.
She looked at her watch.
And the consequence was, the band got back together.
And the world said “Somehow, I think I saw this coming.”

== Variations ==
Consequences can also be played in a drawing version, sometimes known as picture consequences, where the first player draws the head, passes it unseen (by means of folding) to the second player who draws the body, then on to the third player who draws the legs. The composite person or creature is then revealed to all by unfolding the paper.

Although Consequences was originally an analogue game, there are digital versions available, some of which are slightly modified and adjusted. The game has also been seen as a precursor to computer-generated literature, such as the Strachey love letter algorithm.

== See also ==
- Mad Libs
