= Patrick Petersen =

American actor (born 1966)

- Born: August 9, 1966 (age 60); Los Angeles, California, U.S.
- Occupation: Actor
- Years active: 1977–1997
- Children: 2

Patrick Petersen (born August 9, 1966) is an American actor best known for his role as Michael Fairgate in the television drama Knots Landing. He played the role from episode one on December 27, 1979, to May 16, 1991, reprising the part for Knots Landing: Back to the Cul-de-Sac in May 1997. He is the brother of former television actor Chris Petersen.

Petersen also was a regular cast member on the short-lived sitcom The Kallikaks (1977), and, as a teenager, co-starred in the films Alligator (1980) and The Little Dragons (1980).

Since retiring from acting, Petersen owns a health-food business. He is married with two children.

== Filmography ==
Year	Title	Role	Notes
1977	The Kallikaks	J.T. Jr. Kallikak	Main role (5 episodes)
1977	ABC Weekend Specials	Red Chief	Episode: "The Ransom of Red Chief"
1978	How the West Was Won	Jeffrey	Main role (6 episodes)
1978	ABC Weekend Specials	Harvey Small	Episode: "The Contest Kid and the Big Prize"
1979	Having Babies	Douglas	Episode: "Sisters"
1979	CBS Library	Tarby Corrigan	Episode: "Once Upon a Midnight Dreary"
1979	ABC Weekend Specials	Harvey Small	Episode: "The Contest Kid Strikes Again"
1979	ABC Weekend Specials	Red Chief	Episode: "The Revenge of Red Chief"
1979	The Man in the Santa Claus Suit	Lance	TV film
1979–1991	Knots Landing	Michael Fairgate	Main role (186 episodes)
1980	Shirley	Ross Burke	Episode: "Fenced In"
1980	CHiPs	Warren	Episode: "E.M.T."
1980	Alligator	Joey	Feature film
1980	The Little Dragons	Woody	Feature film (aka Karate Kids U.S.A)
1981	Here's Boomer	Joey	Episode: "Boomer's East Side Story"
1981	Code Red	Sam	Episode: "Framed by Fire"
1982	The Kid from Nowhere	Greg Baker Jr.	TV film
1982	ABC Weekend Specials	Toby Monroe (voice)	Episode: "Bunnicula, the Vampire Rabbit"
1982	Cold River	Tim Hood	Feature film
1984	Best Kept Secrets	Ramsey	TV film
1987	CBS Schoolbreak Special	Steve Hunter	Episode: "Little Miss Perfect"
1997	Knots Landing: Back to the Cul-de-Sac	Michael Fairgate	TV miniseries
