= Droodles =

Television series

Four elephants examine an orange or a dead point position by a billiard game

Droodles was a syndicated cartoon feature created by Roger Price and collected in his 1953 book Droodles, though the term is now used more generally of similar visual riddles.

== Form ==
The general form is minimal: a square box containing a few abstract pictorial elements with a caption (or several) giving a humorous explanation of the picture's subject. For example, a Droodle depicting three concentric shapes – little circle, medium circle, big square – might have the caption "Aerial view of a cowboy in a Port-a-john."

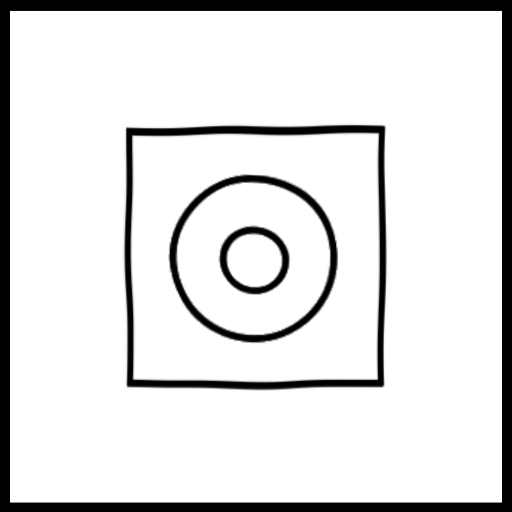
Aerial view of a cowboy in a port-a-john

== Origins ==
The trademarked name "Droodle" suggests "doodle", "drawing" and "riddle". However, the form of the droodle – a riddle expressed in visual form – has earlier roots, for example in a drawing (indovinelli grafici) by the Italian painter Agostino Carracci (1557–1602), and the term is widely used beyond Price's work.

Droodles are (or were) purely a form of entertainment like any other nonsense cartoon and appeared in roughly the same places (newspapers, paperback collections, bathroom walls) during their heyday in the 1950s and 1960s. The commercial success of Price's collections of Droodles led to the founding of the publishing house Price-Stern-Sloan, and also to the creation of a Droodles-themed game show, Droodles, on NBC in 1954. Series of newspaper advertisements for the News and Max brands of cigarettes featured cigarette-themed Droodles.

== Appearances in art and popular culture ==
One of Price's original Droodles serves as the cover art for Frank Zappa's 1982 album Ship Arriving Too Late to Save a Drowning Witch. Price's other captions for that drawing include "Mother pyramid feeding her baby."

In the classic book The Little Prince, written by Antoine de Saint-Exupéry, a notable Droodle appears as part of one of the most iconic illustrations in the work. During one of the conversations between the Little Prince and the narrator, an intriguing drawing of a snake that swallowed an elephant is presented.

Droodles gained popularity in Latin America through a famous TV show called El Chavo del Ocho. In one episode, characters draw figures similar to Droodles, creating iconic scenes in the show.

By the end of Roberto Bolaño's long novel The Savage Detectives the mysterious works by the lost poetess Cesárea Tinajero turn out to be a short series of Mexican culture visual puns, similar to Price's Droodles.

There was also a droodle-based game called "Mysteriosos" on HBO's Braingames.

== See also ==
- Kilroy was here
- Leonard B. Stern
- Mad Libs
