= The Hero (1966 TV series) =

American TV situation comedy (1966–1967)

- Created by: Leonard Stern
- Starring: Richard Mulligan
- Theme music composer: Jack Marshall
- Composer: Jack Marshall
- Country of origin: United States
- Original language: English
- No. of seasons: 1
- No. of episodes: 16

Production
- Executive producers: Leonard Stern; Daniel Melnick
- Producer: Jay Sandrich
- Running time: 30 minutes
- Production company: Talent Associates

Original release
- Network: NBC
- Release: September 8, 1966 – January 5, 1967

The Hero is an American television sitcom that aired on NBC on Thursday nights at 9:30 p.m. Eastern from September 8, 1966, to January 5, 1967. It was the first television series for Richard Mulligan.

After reports of possible cancelation of the series surfaced in the fall of 1966, the National Association for Better Broadcasting (NABB) wrote to NBC and to sponsors Lever Brothers Company and R. J. Reynolds Tobacco Company asking that it not be canceled. Frank Orme, NABB's executive director, said that ending the series would undermine writers' and producers' efforts to come up with shows "that would reverse the continuing decline in standards of network entertainment programming."

== Premise ==
The series centers on Sam Garret, the star of a fictional Western television series titled Jed Clayton — U.S. Marshal. In contrast to the Western's success onscreen, Garret is "a clumsy bloke offscreen." An article in The New York Times described the character as "a good-natured family man with 10 thumbs and a fear of horses."

Other characters include Garret's wife, Ruth, and their son, Paul. Fred Gilman and his son, Burton, are the Garrets' neighbors.

== Cast ==
- Richard Mulligan as Sam Garret
- Mariette Hartley as Ruth Garret
- Bobby Horan as Paul Garret
- Victor French as Fred Gilman
- Marc London as Dewey
- Joey Baio as Burton Gilman

== Episodes ==
No.	Title	Directed by	Written by	Original release date
1	"A Night to Remember to Forget"	Robert Ellis Miller	Bill Idelson & Sam Bobrick	September 8, 1966
2	"The Big Return of Little Eddie"	Unknown	Leonard Stern & Don Hinkley	September 15, 1966
3	"Pardon Me, But Your Party's Showing"	Unknown	Bill Idelson & Sam Bobrick	September 22, 1966
4	"Curiosity Killed a Key"	Unknown	Roswell Rogers	September 29, 1966
5	"Rumble Without a Cause"	Unknown	Ronald Axe & Sydney Zelinka	October 6, 1966
6	"The Kid's Revenge"	Unknown	Roswell Rogers	October 13, 1966
7	"The Matchmaker"	Unknown	Bill Idelson & Sam Bobrick	October 20, 1966
8	"The Day They Shot Sam Garret"	William Wiard	Austin Kalish & Irma Kalish and Leonard Stern	November 3, 1966
9	"If You Loved Me, You'd Hate Me"	Unknown	Budd Grossman	November 10, 1966
10	"Universal Language"	Unknown	Roswell Rogers	November 17, 1966
11	"I Wouldn't Wish It on a Dog"	Unknown	Bill Idelson & Sam Bobrick	November 24, 1966
12	"The Truth Never Hurts...Much"	Unknown	Martin Ragaway	December 1, 1966
13	"Who Needs a Friend in Need?"	Unknown	Bill Idelson & Sam Bobrick	December 8, 1966
14	"I Have a Friend"	William Wiard	Joseph C. Cavella & Carol Cavella	December 15, 1966
15	"My Favorite Father"	Unknown	Roswell Rogers	December 22, 1966
16	"The Terribly Talented Trayton Tyler Taylor"	Unknown	Arne Sultan	January 5, 1967

== Production ==
Leonard Stern was the series's creator and executive producer. Jay Sandrich was the producer for Talent Associates. Sixteen episodes were filmed in color at Paramount Studios in Hollywood. It was broadcast at 9:30 p.m. Eastern Time on Thursdays.
