= Stanley Ralph Ross =

American screenwriter

- Publicity Photo of Stanley Ralph Ross
- Born: Stanley Ralph Rosenberg; July 22, 1935; New York City, U.S.
- Died: March 16, 2000 (aged 64); Los Angeles, California, U.S.
- Resting place: Hillside Memorial Park Cemetery
- Years active: 1952–2000
- Spouse: Neila Hyman (m. 1958)
- Children: 3

Stanley Ralph Ross (July 22, 1935 – March 16, 2000) was an American writer and actor. Born Stanley Ralph Rosenberg, he was raised in Brooklyn, New York, working at Nathan's Famous and as a barker at the Coney Island freak show. His classmate at Abraham Lincoln High School (and later the best man at his wedding) was Louis Gossett Jr.

== Career ==
After graduating from high school in 1952, Ross sang with a vocal group first called The Three Feathers, and then The Formals, who recorded a single for Dawn Records. Their arranger was Dave Lambert. Rather than going to college, Ross performed as a comedy duo with Paul Krassner. He then sold adding machines, and worked as an agent for photographers (including Weegee) and models. “I didn’t know I was a writer,” Ross later recalled. “I didn’t find that out until many years later.”

Ross moved to Los Angeles in 1956, and met his wife, Neila Hyman, almost immediately. While working in advertising (“where I learned how to write,” Ross recalled later), Ross teamed with Bob Arbogast to write and record the 1958 novelty record "Chaos". When it came out on Liberty Records, it sold 10,000 copies in three days and then was banned from radio play when stations realized that it satirized Top 40 radio. The record became a favorite of Dr Demento, and may have influenced George Carlin’s “Wonderful WINO” radio routine.

Ross made his mark on television as a writer. While working in promotions for ABC, he wrote (and directed) the classic opening segment to ABC's Wide World of Sports:

Spanning the globe to bring you the constant variety of sport… the thrill of victory… and the agony of defeat… the human drama of athletic competition… this is ABC's Wide World of Sports!

Ross wrote for song parodist Allan Sherman, and then co-wrote with Arbogast an album of parody songs titled My Son, the Copycat (as Stan Ross). After the release of the album, an agent told Ross, “You’re a better writer than you are a singer. We may have some work for you.” Ross was then hired to rewrite Beach Party (1963). This led to television writing credits, although Ross wrote another parody album for singer Christine Nelson, who had partnered with Allan Sherman on his song “Sarah Jackman.” At the live recording of the Christine Nelson album (1966's Did'ja Come To Play Cards Or To Talk?), Ross was approached by producer Howie Horwitz, who invited him to pitch story ideas for the new TV show, Batman.

Ross wrote 27 episodes of the 1960s Batman series, while doing rewrites on many others. He became particularly identified with the character of Catwoman, writing almost all of that character's episodes. “What I put into the character is what I wanted to see in a woman,” Ross recalled later. “Bright, sexually aggressive, and had fun doing what she did.” He had an uncredited cameo in one episode in which he played "Ballpoint Baxter." Ballpoint then became his nickname in real life.

Although most recognized for his work on Batman, Ross also wrote for many other series, including The Monkees, Banacek, The Man from U.N.C.L.E., Columbo, The Electric Company, and G.I. Joe. He was the co-creator with Roger Price of the 1977 NBC situation comedy The Kallikaks and also wrote for the show. He was nominated for both an Emmy and a WGA Award for writing a 1971 episode of All in the Family. Ross was credited on at least one occasion as Sue Donem, a pun on "pseudonym". He also co-wrote the pilot that became the series That’s My Mama.

Ross was involved in multiple efforts to bring the comic book character Wonder Woman to television. Having been asked to write an alternative treatment for the Stan Hart and Larry Siegel 1967 proposal, Ross was later approached by producer Douglas S. Cramer in 1973 to write a series pilot. Ross declined, objecting to the series' updated Wonder Woman character (based on the 1960s and 70s comic book) and the casting of Cathy Lee Crosby. When the 1974 Crosby pilot failed, Ross was brought in to develop his own vision which put a high priority on visual fidelity to the look of the classic comics. The resulting Wonder Woman aired from 1975 to 1979. Ross was instrumental in the choosing of Lynda Carter and Lyle Waggoner as the show's stars.

In 1977, Ross was awarded the Inkpot Award.

== Acting work ==
Ross was known for his distinctive voice, and did much voiceover work, in addition to dramatic roles. He did the voice of Gorilla Grodd on Challenge of the Superfriends and Super Friends cartoons, as well as taking over as Brainiac in Super Friends, Super Friends: The Legendary Super Powers Show and The Super Powers Team: Galactic Guardians (following the death of Ted Cassidy), Perry White in the 1988 Superman cartoon, Dark Paw in Paw Paws. He provided the voice for the Arab singer in the original version of The Flight of the Phoenix and was also the voice of the Doberman and Bull Terrier characters in the movie, Babe: Pig in the City.

Ross also had numerous smaller parts (voice and acting) on television, movies, and over 1000 commercials. One of his most notable on-screen TV roles was Mr. Goodbury on The Munsters Today.

His radio vignettes were heard on KFI, Los Angeles during 1973.

== Audio books ==
In addition to his other work Ross also recorded audio books. Some of his recordings are A Book of the Five Rings based on the book of the same name by Musashi Miyamoto, Believe and Achieve based on the writings of Napoleon Hill and Awakening Your Mind Power, Channeling Your Higher Self, Explore Your Past Lives, Meditation and Self Hypnosis all based on the writings of Edgar Cayce.

== Other work ==
Ross was also a songwriter, composing over 200 pieces, collaborating with such talent as Henry Mancini. He wrote "Beat the System," the theme song for The Kallikaks, which Roy Clark performed for the opening credits of the show in 1977. He also made several forays into musical theater, co-writing and co-composing the musical Love Is Spoken Here with Jacquelyn Reinach.

In theatre, Ross wrote and produced “A Play With Fire” in Dundee, Scotland.

Ross wrote book, music, and lyrics for a stage musical called Chaplin with star Anthony Newley, who played the title role of Charlie Chaplin. The show was scheduled to come to Broadway in 1983, but fell apart after a tryout in Los Angeles.

He also taught at the University of Southern California film school.

In collaboration with Jay Robert Nash, Ross authored The Motion Picture Guide, a comprehensive multi-volume set of encyclopedias written from the 1970s to the early 1980s, containing detailed descriptions of possibly every motion picture made up to that time, with a two-volume index, and a separate volume entirely dedicated to silent films, and yet another listing every actor (and other major creative credit) with that person's complete list of films. The regular encyclopedia editions alphabetized every sound feature from 1927 until 1983, the last volume having a separate section in the back for 1984 movies (and the deaths of that year) that were compiled too close to press time to include alphabetically among the other listings; and starting in 1985 until the early 1990s, an individual volume was released annually, with an obituary section for that year also included. It used a five-star rating system, and was perhaps the most complete single project to catalog every movie until the creation of The Internet Movie Database (IMDb).

With Bob Arbogast, Ross wrote a 1975 book called Speak When You Hear the Beep. He later co-wrote the 1995 book Boy Wonder: My Life in Tights with Burt Ward, who starred as Robin on the 1960s Batman series. An ordained minister, Ross married Ward to his third wife; and married Milton Berle to his fourth wife.

In the early 1990s, Ross bought the Hamptons Hollywood Cafe, which had been opened by Paul Newman and artist Ron Buck in 1977. Under his ownership, the restaurant was renovated and the menu updated. The restaurant closed in 2002.

== Death ==
Ross died of lung cancer on March 16, 2000, leaving behind his wife Neila, three children, and a granddaughter. He was buried in Hillside Memorial Park Cemetery. His grave reads: Larger Than Life Beloved Son, Husband, Father, Grandfather STANLEY RALPH ROSS July 22, 1935 * March 16, 2000 "Thanks, I Had A Wonderful Time!"

== Actor ==
- John Goldfarb, Please Come Home (1964) as Muezzin (uncredited)
- My Favorite Martian (1964) as Folk Singer
- The Flight of the Phoenix (1965) as Arab Singer (uncredited)
- The Felony Squad (1966) as Reynolds
- Tony Rome (1967) as Sam Boyd
- Sleeper (1973) as Sears Wiggles
- Candy Stripe Nurses (1974) as Dr. Kramer
- The Lost Saucer (1975) as Dr. Frankenstein XIII
- Far Out Space Nuts (1975) as Dr. Drone
- Ellery Queen (1976) as Gabe
- Helter Skelter (1976, TV Mini-Series) as Sgt. Ross
- Serpico (1976) as Sgt. Meyers
- Three on a Date (1978) as Al
- Flying High (1979) as Newscaster
- For the Love of It (1980) as Agitated Driver
- Hart to Hart (1981) as Harry Carney
- Bret Maverick (1982) as Coates
- Casablanca (1983) as Bou Azza
- Romantic Comedy (1983)
- Allison Sydney Harrison (1983) as Karate Instructor
- The Facts of Life (1984) as Convict #1
- The Paper Chase (1985)
- The Boss' Wife (1986) as Ticket Taker
- Falcon Crest (1987–1989) as Bank Manager / Phillip Tindall
- Side Out (1990) as Judge McKibbon
- The Munsters Today (1990) as Mr. Goodbury
- Ray Alexander: A Taste for Justice (1994) as Milo Balian
- An Alan Smithee Film: Burn Hollywood Burn (1997) as Stanley Ralph Ross
- Babe: Pig in the City (1998) as The Pitbull and Doberman (voice) (final film role)
- HeartPower! Sing-Along (1999) Tobacco Man (final role)

== Screenwriter ==
=== Television ===
- The Man from U.N.C.L.E. (1966–1967)
- Batman (1966–1968)
- The Monkees (1967)
- That Girl (1967)
- Barefoot in the Park (1970)
- The Bugaloos (1971)
- All in the Family (1971, 1973)
- Love, American Style (1972)
- The New Bill Cosby Show (1972)
- The Mod Squad (1972)
- Banacek (1972–1973)
- Wait Till Your Father Gets Home (1973)
- Columbo (1973–1974)
- That’s My Mama (1975)
- Wonder Woman (1975–1979)
- Monster Squad (1976)
- The Kallikaks (1977)
- Murder at the Mardi Gras (1978)
- G.I. Joe: A Real American Hero (1985)
- Kids Incorporated (1985)
- Tales from the Crypt (1992)
- Burke’s Law (1995)

=== Films ===
- The Wild Weird World of Dr. Goldfoot (1965)
- Follow Me (1967)
- Coffee, Tea or Me? (1973)
- Death Among Friends (1975)
- Sky Heist (1975)
- Best Friends (1977)
- Three on a Date (1978)
- Murder at the Mardi Gras (1978)
- Gold of the Amazon Women (1979) as Sue Donem
- For the Love of It (1980)
- The Texas Rangers (1981)
- Carlo’s Wake (1990) (producer)
