= Roger Price (humorist) =

American humorist (1918-1990)

- Born: March 6, 1918; Charleston, West Virginia, U.S.
- Died: October 31, 1990 (aged 72); Los Angeles, California
- Education: University of Michigan (1934–36); American Academy of Art in Chicago (1936–38)
- Occupations: Humorist, author, publisher, actor
- Known for: Droodles, Mad Libs, Price Stern Sloan
- Notable work: In One Head and Out the Other
- Spouses: Annette Weaver (m. 1941; div. 1942) Bettina Lerfield (m. 1942; div. 1948) Anita Martell (Janette Davidson) (m. 1951; div. 1952) Misa Ban (m. 1960; div. 1961)
- Children: (with Bettina Lerfield) Roger Taylor Price III (b. 1943), Sandi Price (b. 1944)

Roger Price (March 6, 1918 – October 31, 1990) was an American humorist, author and publisher, who created Droodles in the 1950s, followed by his collaborations with Leonard B. Stern on the Mad Libs series. Price and Stern became partners with Larry Sloan in the publishing firm Price Stern Sloan.

== Biography ==
Price was born in Charleston, West Virginia, and grew up in the mining town of Widen, West Virginia. He graduated from Greenbrier Military School in 1934, then attended the University of Michigan (1934–1936) and the American Academy of Art in Chicago (1936–1938).

During the 1940s, he wrote for The Bob Hope Show and worked with Hope on a newspaper humor column. On Broadway he performed in Arthur Klein's musical revue Tickets, Please! (1950), and he contributed sketch material to Leonard Sillman's New Faces of 1952. Price hosted the television panel show How To (1951), and he was a panelist on other game shows of the early 1950s: Who's There? What Happened? That Reminds Me, The Name's the Same and What's My Line?

=== Droodles ===

In 1953, Price invented Droodles, a syndicated feature which he described as "a borkley-looking sort of drawing that doesn't make any sense until you know the correct title." When Simon & Schuster published Price's Droodles in 1953, the book launched a Droodle craze that was fueled by a series of ads in college newspapers offering cash prizes for Droodles created by college students. In 1954, Price hosted a Droodles television game show with panelists Marc Connelly, Denise Lor and Carl Reiner. More Droodles were gathered in follow-up books, The Rich Sardine (1954) and Oodles of Droodles (1955). Over the years, many of the drawings (minus the author's droll commentary) have been reprinted in collections such as Classic Droodles. One of Price's original Droodles serves as the cover art for Frank Zappa's 1982 album Ship Arriving Too Late to Save a Drowning Witch. Price's other captions for that drawing include "Mother pyramid feeding her baby."

In 2000, after Stern and Sloan launched another publishing company, Tallfellow Press, they acquired the rights to Droodles and reissued it as Droodles: The Classic Collection.

=== Price and Harvey Kurtzman ===
Price had four articles in Harvey Kurtzman's Mad in 1955–1956 and later contributed to Kurtzman's 1960s magazine Help!. In the introduction to Mad's first paperback collection, The Mad Reader (Ballantine Books, 1954), he described Kurtzman's appearance:

He is 5 feet 6 inches tall and has a physique that is just barely noticeable and a long expression. In fact, Harvey looks like a beagle who is too polite to mention that someone is standing on his tail. This Beagleishness has certain compensations – he is never ordered off the grass in Central Park and Pretty Girls frequently stop on the street to scratch him behind the ears.

=== Mad Libs and Price Stern Sloan ===
The same year the Droodle was born, Price and Stern invented Mad Libs (although the first book in the series was not published until 1958). The title came about when the two were in Sardi's and overheard an actor arguing with his agent. The actor wanted to "ad-lib" an interview, but his agent thought such an approach was "mad".

According to Stern, the concept was hatched accidentally. Stern was scripting an episode for The Honeymooners in 1953 when Price came by. Stern recalled, "I was trying to find the right word to describe the nose of Ralph Kramden's new boss. So I asked Roger for an idea for an adjective and before I could tell him what it was describing, he threw out 'clumsy' and 'naked'. We both started laughing. We sat down and wrote a bunch of stories with blanks in them. That night we took them to a cocktail party and they were a great success ... We were turned down by every publisher in the New York area. Publishers told us it wasn't a book and suggested we approach game manufacturers, but they also rejected us and advised us to talk to publishers. It became a well-worn path."

A Publishers Weekly article described the rise of Mad Libs after the initial 1958 publication:

The duo found a printer and self-published 14,000 copies. Soon thereafter, Ballantine Books founder (and friend) Ian Ballantine agreed to distribute the book on a short-term basis. That first printing did not last long. Stern, then head writer and comedy director for NBC's The Steve Allen Show, suggested to Allen that they use the Mad Libs format to introduce guest stars, with the audience supplying words. Allen agreed, and on the next show he held up Mad Libs as Bob Hope was introduced (audience members described the comedian as "scintillating" and dubbed his theme song, "Thanks for the Communists"). Within days, bookstores sold out of Mad Libs. In the early 1960s, Price and Stern partnered with Larry Sloan, an old high school friend of Stern's, to create their own publishing company. Sloan became CEO of Price Stern Sloan, and his partners wrote additional Mad Libs titles, gearing them toward children since much of their fan mail was from kids. With multiple titles landing on bestseller lists and the house's acquisition of other popular properties, including Wee Sing, Mr. Men and Little Miss and Serendipity, Price Stern Sloan grew to be what Stern terms "the biggest publisher west of the Mississippi at the time". In 1993, Stern and Sloan (Price had died three years earlier) sold their company to the Putnam Berkley Group.

=== Roger Price Gallery and Grump ===
Don Silverstein illustration for Grump, edited and published by Roger Price in 1965–67

During the 1960s, Price opened the first New York art gallery devoted solely to cartoons.

In 1965–1967 he published and edited the short-lived humor publication, Grump, which featured such contributors as Isaac Asimov, Christopher Cerf, Derek Robinson, Susan Sands, Jean Shepherd, and cartoonists Don Silverstein and David C. K. McClelland.

He was the co-creator with Stanley Ralph Ross of the short-lived 1977 NBC situation comedy The Kallikaks, and he also wrote for the show.

=== Personal life and death ===
Price was married four times; all the marriages ended in divorce. He had two children with his second wife, Bettina Lerfield.

At the time of his death in 1990, Price lived in Studio City, California.

== Books ==
In One Head and Out the Other (Ballantine, 1951), which popularized the catchphrase "I had one grunch, but the eggplant over there." The nonsense non sequitur was immediately adopted by science fiction fandom, appearing occasionally in science fiction fanzines, as noted in Fancyclopedia II (1959). Using the 18th-century historian Edward Gibbon's book The Decline and Fall of the Roman Empire as a comparison to America's upheaval in the 60's, this satirical book compares Roman decline to America's woes. In Price's In One Head and Out the Other, the "bible of Avoidism", his character Clayton Slope "had a clever trick of saying any conceivable sentence so that it sounded like 'I had one grunch but the eggplant over there.' Fans find the expression useful, too ... "Avoidism: Not originally fannish at all, but a philosophy devised in a rather stomach-turning book, In One Head and Out the Other, this doctrine became confused/associated with the Gandhi-following folk of Eric Frank Russell's "And Then There Were None." It inspired an APA, MYOB and an Avoidist Movement which avoided amounting to anything. Tenets are those implied by the root word. Lee Hoffman explains that three types of avoidism are distinguished:

1. pure
2. applied
3. active (or Activist)

In pure avoiding, one avoids everything except eating, breathing and metabolizing. In applied avoiding, one avoids as many things as possible. (Bus drivers are good at this sort of thing, like avoiding people waiting at bus stops.) Active avoidism isn't true avoidism and is practiced to Publicize the Cause, or as an exercise in Avoiding. Under active avoidism there is the subgroup Counteravoiding; to counteravoid vegetarianism, for instance, one eats meat. Leeh concluded: "A last word on Avoidism: I had one grunch but the eggplant over there."

An annoying Price dissident in In One Head and Out the Other who crops up from time to time to object forlornly to Avoidist doctrine in many of its guises is one Dr. Carl Gassoway, whom Price promptly and heartlessly dismisses every time as a troublemaker; a refreshing Price ingénue who similarly appears and reappears is Miss Patricia Delray. In a key chapter, Price advised mothers to encourage their offspring to adopt Avoidist habits and responses to the tribulations of real life is to have them read, as a nightly bedtime story, his adaptation of Prokofiev's Peter and the Wolf (which he first wanted to use in its original form until the composer demanded too many rubles' royalty), namely Milton and the Rhinoceros, in which the latter triumphs by overcoming and eating the former, whose final blunder was to mistake the FIERCE RHINOCEROS!! (as Price instructed the mother to shout loudly at key points in the narrative), when he first came upon the beast, for a Studebaker. Moral: Don't go into deep woodses! Or anywhere!

Droodles (Simon & Schuster, 1953)

I'm for Me First (Ballantine, 1954) is a humor book about Herman Clabbercutt's plan to launch a revolutionary political party known as the "I'm for Me First" Party.

The Rich Sardine (1954) — Droodles collection

Oodles of Droodles (1955) — Droodles collection

J.G., the Upright Ape (1960), which publisher Lyle Stuart claimed was one of his worst-selling books. It was described by Robert Michael Pyle in Orion Afield (Autumn 1998):

By chance, when I was buying Daniel Quinn's book (Ishmael) at Powell's Books in Portland, I first spotted Roger Price's J.G., The Upright Ape. This 1960 novel also employs the device of the gorilla as the protagonist. J.G. is a member of a fictional high-elevation subspecies called the silver gorillas. His search for his abducted mate, Lotus, in America becomes a vehicle for sharp, witty satire of contemporary culture. "For the first time in his life, J.G. was unhappy. It required great concentration on his part, because it isn't easy to be unhappy when you have such a tiny brain." Neither author can challenge Schaller's and Fossey's gorilla scholarship, but their fictions point to a conclusion that the researchers might recognize: gorillas—gentle, cooperative, environmentally benign—are in some ways better than humans.

What Not to Name the Baby (Price-Stern, 1960)

The Great Roob Revolution (Random House, 1970)

== Partial filmography ==
- Mame (1974) – Ralph Divine
- Mixed Company (1974) – The Doctor
- The Strongest Man in the World (1975) – Roger
- At Long Last Love (1975) – Alfred
- The Day of the Locust (1975) – Guest #3
- I Wonder Who's Killing Her Now? (1975)
- Billy Jack Goes to Washington (1977) – Senator
- Pete's Dragon (1977) – Man with Visor
- The Cat from Outer Space (1978) – 1st E.R.L. Expert
- Just You and Me, Kid (1979) – Mailman
- The Devil and Max Devlin (1981) – Old Man
