= Breaking Boredom Project =

An artistic project curated by Adrien Foula in Cairo, 2008.

== Idea ==
The Breaking Boredom Project was a collaborative graphic design project based on the Surrealist technique known as the Exquisite Corpse. Six graphic designers contributed to a series of twelve designs, with each participant building on the contribution of the previous designer. The project was exhibited at The Townhouse Gallery in Cairo and the Alexandria Contemporary Arts Forum (ACAF).

== Participants ==
Ibrahim Eslam; born in Cairo in January 1977, graduated from the Faculty of Fine Arts in 2000.

Engy Aly; born in 1982. Studied Graphic Design and graduated in 2005. Exhibited artworks in different locations in Egypt and other countries. Currently a member of the FC Studio team, besides being a freelance graphic designer.

George Azmy; born in Cairo in 1983, graduated from fine arts faculty, Helwan University in 2005. Worked as a graphic designer, story border, illustrator, and compositing as a free lancer during college, then he worked in FC studio after graduation, after that he worked for a major advertising agency in Cairo, later he moved to Dubai, then back to Cairo to be a freelancer there. In 2007 he held his first solo exhibition, entitled "planet Cairo" at the Townhouse Gallery in Cairo.

Mofa; had one solo exhibition at the Townhouse Onsite titled "Everyday Heroes". He participated in a group workshop video screening at Rawabet Theatre, as well as a group workshop exhibition at the Goethe Institute in Cairo. He has also created designs for companies, retail, and publications through his studio Ganzeer.

Mahmoud Hamdy; born in 1977, Mahmoud Hamdy studied animation at the College of Fine Arts in Cairo. He has participated in a number of workshops and exhibitions. Through its Artists-in-Residence program, Pro Helvetia Cairo invited him at the F+F School for Media Art and Design, Zürich, Switzerland 2005–2006. His work participated, nominated and has been awarded in a number of International festivals and exhibitions. Since 2000, he collaborated with artists from Germany, Switzerland, as well as Egypt. He is one of the founding partners of [FC Studio] http://www.fileclub.org . Hamdy works with Video, Image, graphics and site-specific installation. He lives and works in Cairo.

Hani Mahfouz; graduated from the faculty of Fine Arts in Alexandria in 1988. In 1997, he founded h|m|d studio. Hani lives and works in Cairo.

Adrien Foula (Curator of the project); graduated from the Architecture department of the Faculty of Fine Arts, Alexandria University in 2001. He started his career as a graphic designer with the publicity campaign of "Roaming Inner Landscapes" event, which was held in Alexandria in February 2003. Since then; he designed several campaigns for many artistic events in Egypt and in the Arab region, as well as visual identities for a number of culture and art spaces. Foula currently lives and works in Montreal, Canada.
