= How to Be a Jewish Mother =

1964 Jewish humor book by Dan Greenburg

How to Be a Jewish Mother: A Very Lovely Training Manual
- First edition
- Author: Dan Greenburg
- Language: English
- Publisher: Price Stern Sloan
- Publication date: October 1964
- Publication place: United States
- Media type: Print (hardcover)
- Pages: 99

How to Be a Jewish Mother is a 1964 Jewish humor book by American humorist Dan Greenburg which was the best-selling non-fiction book in the United States in 1965, with 270,000 copies sold. The book was first published by Price Stern Sloan under publisher Larry Sloan.

The book was adapted into a play starring Molly Picon and Godfrey Cambridge which had a brief run on Broadway at the Hudson Theater from December 1967 through January 1968. The actress Gertrude Berg was preparing for the main role in the play but died during pre-production.

The play was profiled in the William Goldman book The Season: A Candid Look at Broadway.

A 1983 French adaptation, Comment devenir une mère juive en 10 leçons, met with long-running success. Gertrude Berg also released a best-selling comedy album from the book in 1965.

It was re-issued as a mass-market paperback in 1991 (ISBN 0843100206, ISBN 9780843100204).

It is deemed as a book that reinforced the stereotype of the Jewish mother in American culture. The anthropologist Jonathan Boyarin qualified the book a "work of covert anti-Semitism".
