= The Kallikaks =

1977 American sitcom television series

- A promotional photo for The Kallikaks, showing David Huddleston as J. T. Kallikak.
- Genre: Sitcom
- Created by: Roger Price; Stanley Ralph Ross
- Starring: David Huddleston; Edie McClurg; Bonnie Ebsen; Patrick J. Petersen; Peter Palmer
- Theme music composer: Stanley Ralph Ross
- Opening theme: "Beat the System", performed by Roy Clark
- Country of origin: United States
- Original language: English
- No. of seasons: 1
- No. of episodes: 5

Production
- Executive producer: Stanley Ralph Ross
- Producer: George Yanok
- Running time: 30 minutes

Original release
- Network: NBC
- Release: August 3 – August 31, 1977

The Kallikaks is an American sitcom television series starring David Huddleston which centers around a family from Appalachia that moves to California to run a decrepit gas station. The show aired from August 3 to August 31, 1977 on NBC.

== Synopsis ==
Jasper T. "J. T." Kallikak is a coal miner from Appalachia who inherits a run-down two-pump gas station in the fictional town of Nowhere, California. Thinking that, as his own boss, he will have a better life, he moves his impoverished family — his overly affectionate wife Venus, his status-seeking teenage daughter Bobbie Lou, and his 10-year-old son Junior — from West Virginia to California to run the station.

J. T.'s boarder and only employee is Oscar Heinz, a German immigrant who can barely speak English and as a result often gets things mixed up. Bobbi Lou gets a job at a nearby fried chicken stand. J. T. is conniving, greedy, and inclined toward get-rich-quick schemes; he boasts of never having paid taxes, saying that there is no need to as long as there are fools who do pay their taxes. He and his family are always trying to "beat the system"; such as applying for welfare despite being employed. The pumps at their gas station are rigged, and generally, their schemes to get ahead involve conning and cheating someone else.

== Cast ==
- David Huddleston as Jasper T. "J. T." Kallikak
- Edie McClurg as Venus Kallikak
- Bonnie Ebsen as Bobbi Lou Kallikak
- Patrick J. Petersen as Junior Kallikak
- Peter Palmer as Oscar Heinz

== Production ==
The Kallikaks was created by Stanley Ralph Ross and Roger Price. Ross was its executive producer and George Yanok was its producer. Ross, Price, and Ron Kantor wrote the episodes. Episode directors were Kantor, Bob LaHendro, and Dennis Steinmetz.

Ross wrote the show's theme song, "Beat the System," which Roy Clark performed. Tom Wells wrote other music used in the show.

Bonnie Ebsen is the daughter of Buddy Ebsen, who was best known for his role in The Beverly Hillbillies.

== Broadcast history ==
The Kallikaks premiered on August 3, 1977, and aired on NBC on Wednesdays at 9:30 p.m. throughout its brief run. Only five episodes were produced, and the show was canceled due to poor ratings.

== Episodes ==
No.	Title	Directed by	Written by	Original release date
1	"You Auto Buy Now"	Unknown	Unknown	August 3, 1977
J.T. tries to get rid of a jalopy that has been abandoned at the gas station.
2	"TV or Not TV"	Unknown	Unknown	August 10, 1977
The Kallikaks receive a television set from an audience-rating service, and a television producer wants them to watch his shows on it.
3	"The Bells Are Wronging"	Unknown	Unknown	August 17, 1977
Thanks to a computer error, the Kallikaks mistakenly get a $140,000 refund from the telephone company, and J.T. tries to keep the money.
4	"I Coulda Been a Contender"	Unknown	Unknown	August 24, 1977
After seeing the movie Rocky at a drive-in movie theater, J.T. tries to make Oscar into a prizefighter – and organized crime takes an interest in putting Oscar into the ring.
5	"Swami, How I Love Ya"	Unknown	Unknown	August 31, 1977
The Kallikaks greedily hire a medium, Dr. Wally Walla (Jay Robinson), to find out if Venus's notoriously thrifty deceased brother has left them an inheritance.
