= Thunderball (soundtrack) =

Soundtrack album by John Barry
- Released: 1965
- Recorded: October 1965
- Length: 39:11
- Label: United Artists
- Producer: Frank Collura (reissue)

John Barry chronology
The Knack and How to Get It (1965)	Thunderball (1965)	Born Free (1966)

Singles from Thunderball
- 1. "Thunderball" Released: 1965

Professional ratings
Review scores
Source	Rating
AllMusic	4/5 stars

Thunderball is the 1965 soundtrack album for the fourth James Bond film Thunderball.

The album was first released by United Artists Records in 1965 in both monaural and stereo editions, with a CD release in 1988. The music was composed and conducted by John Barry, and performed by the John Barry Orchestra. This was Barry's third soundtrack for the series. The soundtrack was still being recorded when it came time for the album to be released, so the LP only featured twelve tracks from earlier in the film; an expanded edition with six bonus tracks was released for the first time when the album was reissued on compact disc on 25 February 2003 as part of the "James Bond Remastered" collection. Additionally, the music in the film was unfinished days before the film's release in theatres due to a late change by Eon Productions to use a title song with the same name as the film. The title theme "Thunderball" was performed by Tom Jones.

== Title theme change ==
"Thunderball"
A 17-second sample of "Thunderball", the opening track. Tom Jones, the singer, allegedly fainted in the recording booth while sustaining the long, final note.

The planned theme for Thunderball was "Mr. Kiss Kiss, Bang Bang" composed by John Barry and Leslie Bricusse. The title was taken from an Italian journalist who in 1962 had dubbed agent 007 "Mr. Kiss Kiss, Bang Bang". Barry felt he could not write a song using the term "Thunderball" so instead he wrote a description of James Bond.

The song was first recorded by Shirley Bassey, who had performed the title theme "Goldfinger" for the soundtrack of the previous James Bond film Goldfinger the year prior. There were issues with the length of the track; it was rerecorded by Dionne Warwick as Bassey was not available. It featured a longer instrumental opening, such that the lyrics would not start before the word "Thunderball" appeared in Maurice Binder's title design. The song was removed from the opening credits after United Artists requested that the theme song contain the film's title in its lyrics. Warwick's version was set to appear in the end credits but Shirley Bassey sued the producers resulting in neither version being used in the film. Both backing tracks appeared on different versions of the soundtrack, remade as instrumentals: Bassey's on the high fidelity LP and Warwick's on the stereo LP.

Barry teamed up with lyricist Don Black and wrote "Thunderball" in a rush. Tom Jones, who sang the new theme song, allegedly fainted in the recording booth after singing the song's final, high note. Jones said of the final note, "I closed my eyes and I held the note for so long when I opened my eyes the room was spinning."

Country musician Johnny Cash also submitted a song to Eon Productions titled "Thunderball" but it was not used. The lyrics of Cash's "Thunderball" describe the film's story.

The producers' decision to change the film's theme song so close to the release date meant that only some of the film's soundtrack had been recorded for release on LP. Adding to the delay issues, Barry had written large amounts of the score around the original theme and woven it throughout the score (along with the recurring underwater "Search For Vulcan" motif). After "Thunderball" was written, Barry wrote, orchestrated, and recorded several new pieces interpolating it.

Though "Mr. Kiss Kiss Bang Bang" was dropped as the theme song, some of the pieces which included its melody remained part of the score, and it receives full statements twice: by full orchestra and jazz rhythm quartet with bass, drums, guitar, and vibraphone in the track "Café Martinique" (immediately followed by the "Vulcan" cue), and as a wild, bongo-laden cha-cha-chá in "Death of Fiona." The scene which includes the latter takes place at Club Kiss Kiss, and features the bongo drumming of bandleader King Errisson.

== Composition ==
The title song was composed in the key of B-flat minor.

== 2003 Remastered Track listing ==
1. "Thunderball (Main Title)" – Tom Jones (Note: contains the "James Bond Theme", originally composed for the Dr. No soundtrack)
2. "Chateau Flight"
3. "The Spa"
4. "Switching the Body"
5. "The Bomb"
6. "Cafe Martinique"
7. "Thunderball (Instrumental)"
8. "Death of Fiona"
9. "Bond Below Disco Volante"
10. "Search for Vulcan"
11. "007" (Note: contains "007", originally from the From Russia with Love soundtrack)
12. "Mr. Kiss Kiss Bang Bang"

CD bonus tracks

1. "Gunbarrel / Traction Table / Gassing the Plane / Car Chase"
2. "Bond Meets Domino / Shark Tank / Lights out for Paula / For King and Country"
3. "Street Chase"
4. "Finding the Plane / Underwater Ballet / Bond with SPECTRE Frogmen / Leiter to the Rescue / Bond Joins Underwater Battle"
5. "Underwater Mayhem / Death of Largo / End Titles"
6. "Mr. Kiss Kiss Bang Bang (Mono Version)"

== 2025 La-La Land Expanded Release TRACK LISTING ==
DISC 1 SCORE PRESENTATION 1:31:26

1. Gun Barrel (From “Thunderball”) 0:24 (Contains The James Bond Theme)
2. Château Flight (Film Version) 2:32 (Contains The James Bond Theme)
3. Main Title – Thunderball (Performed by Tom Jones) 3:03
4. The Spa 2:43
5. The Rack And Sweat Box 2:35 (Contains The James Bond Theme)
6. Double Derval 3:02
7. Switching The Body 2:47 (Contains The James Bond Theme)
8. Gassing The Plane 0:59
9. The Bomb (Film Version) 5:52 (Contains The James Bond Theme)
10. The Execution Branch 1:55 (Contains The James Bond Theme)
11. Code Name: Thunderball 0:46
12. Bond Meets Domino 3:58 (Contains The James Bond Theme)
13. Casino 1:06
14. Café Martinique (Film Version) 3:44 (Contains The James Bond Theme)
15. Shark Tank 2:41 (Contains The James Bond Theme)
16. Bond Below Disco Volante (Extended Version) 4:04 (Contains The James Bond Theme)
17. SPECTRE Ring 0:41
18. Search For Vulcan 2:23
19. Lights Out For Paula 2:49
20. Bathing Beauty 1:20
21. For King And Country 1:37 (Contains The James Bond Theme)
22. Street Chase And Kiss Kiss Club 3:26
23. Death Of Fiona 2:31
24. The Golden Grotto 3:30 (Contains The James Bond Theme)
25. Underwater Ballet 0:57 (Contains The James Bond Theme)
26. Got The Point 2:26
27. Bond With SPECTRE Frogmen 3:35
28. The Bombs Revealed 1:28
29. Bond Is Discovered 2:44 (Contains The James Bond Theme)
30. Caught 1:08 (Contains The James Bond Theme)

TOTAL DISC 1 TIME: 1:13:38

DISC 2 SCORE PRESENTATION CONTINUED

1. Leiter To The Rescue 1:36
2. The Underwater Battle Begins 4:52 (Contains The James Bond Theme)
3. Underwater Mayhem 5:59
4. Death Of Largo 3:02
5. When Arrows Meet And End Title 2:11 (Contains The James Bond Theme)

ADDITIONAL MUSIC 18:33

1. Mr. Kiss Kiss Bang Bang (Performed by Dionne Warwick) 3:04
2. Bond Meets Domino (Take 1) 4:00 (Contains The James Bond Theme)
3. Street Chase (Early Version) 2:47
4. Mr. Kiss Kiss Bang Bang (Alternate Instrumental) 2:34
5. Do You Fly Here Often? (Mono Stem) 0:27
6. The One That Got Away (Mono Stem) 3:04
7. Mr. Kiss Kiss Bang Bang (Performed by Shirley Bassey) 2:28

ORIGINAL SOUNDTRACK ALBUM 39:09

1. Main Title – Thunderball (Performed by Tom Jones) 3:04
2. Château Flight 2:31 (Contains The James Bond Theme)
3. The Spa 2:44
4. Switching The Body 2:47
5. The Bomb 5:46
6. Café Martinique 3:45
7. Thunderball 3:57
8. Death Of Fiona 2:29
9. Bond Below Disco Volante 3:58
10. Search For Vulcan 2:23
11. 007 2:27
12. Mr. Kiss Kiss Bang Bang 3:16

TOTAL DISC 2 TIME: 1:15:45 TOTAL ALBUM TIME: 2:29:23

== Outside the film ==
- In 1965, KYW-TV in Philadelphia adapted the "007" track, also used in the film From Russia with Love as its longtime theme for its Eyewitness News format. It went on to be used in other Group W stations in Boston, Pittsburgh, Baltimore and San Francisco for their newscasts.

== Parodies / tributes ==
- In 1996, "Weird Al" Yankovic parodied Tom Jones during the opening theme song of the comedy Spy Hard. Instead of passing out, as Jones allegedly did, Yankovic's head explodes at the opening song's end.
- The opening theme to the Warner Bros. cartoon Duck Dodgers (2003–05), performed by Tom Jones with the Flaming Lips, is a pastiche of "Thunderball".
- Jones sang the theme during James Bond actor Sean Connery's AFI Life Achievement Award ceremony in 2006.
- Jaret Reddick, lead singer of Bowling For Soup, covered "Thunderball" on the 2017 multi-artist compilation album, Songs, Bond Songs: The Music of 007.
- The melody from "Finding the Plane / Underwater Ballet / Bond with SPECTRE Frogmen / Leiter to the Rescue / Bond Joins Underwater Battle" is used by My Life with the Thrill Kill Kult on their 1991 third studio album Sexplosion! track "Mood No. 6".

== See also ==
- Outline of James Bond

== Bibliography ==
- Burlingame, Jon The Music of James Bond Oxford University Press, 01/10/2012
- Spencer, Kristopher. Film and Television Scores, 1950–1979: A Critical Survey by Genre. Jefferson, N.C.: McFarland & Co., 2008
