= Michael Jay Solomon =

American businessman and entertainment executive

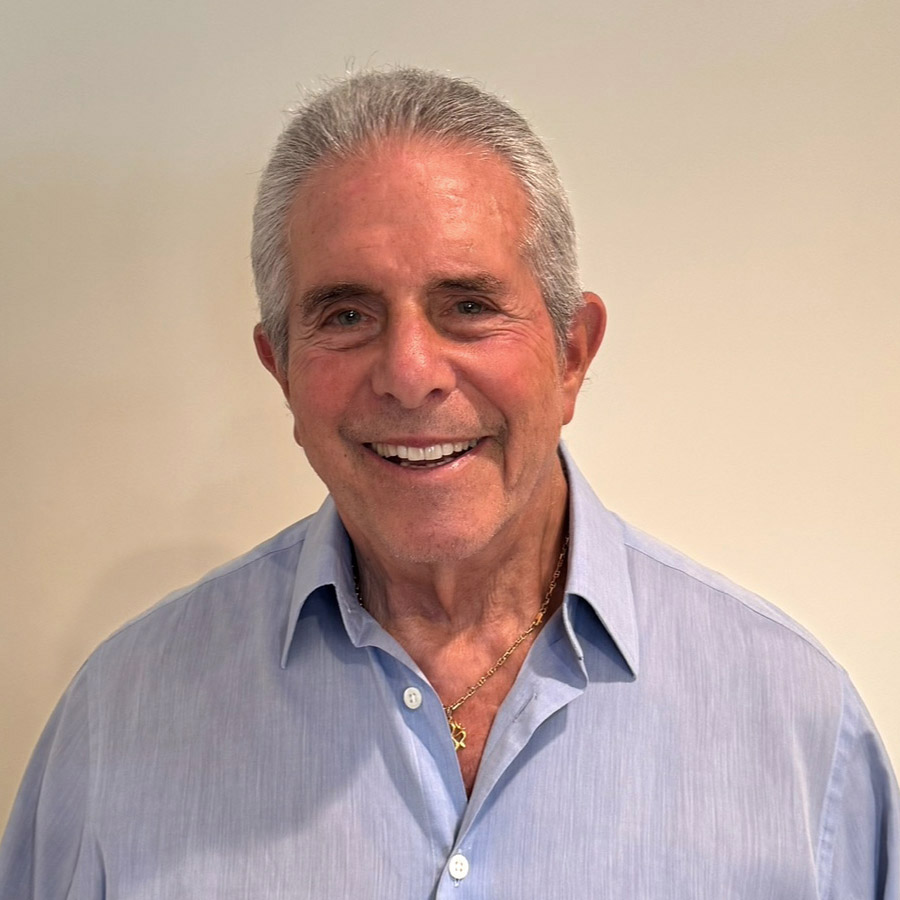
- Michael Jay Solomon in 2024
- Born: January 20, 1938 (age 88); New York City, New York
- Occupations: President and CEO of media companies
- Years active: 1956–present
- Spouse(s): Luciana Paluzzi (1979–present); Barbara Gottlieb (1968–1976)
- Children: 2 Children; 5 Grandchildren
- Website: https://www.michaeljaysolomon.com

Michael Jay Solomon (born January 20, 1938) is an American businessman, and entertainment executive. Solomon's career spans more than 55 years in the media and content distribution business. He is the founder, chairman and president of several publicly and privately held companies. Solomon has founded or sits on the board of philanthropic organizations benefiting education, public health, and the arts.

== Early life and education ==
Solomon is the son of Mildred Rickmann & Leroy Solomon. He has a sister named Susan Goldberg, born in 1935. He was born in New York City, where his family has resided for 4 generations. Mr. Solomon was educated at the Milford Prep School, in Milford, Connecticut, the New York University Stern School of Business, where he later served on NYU's board of overseers (33 years), and also at Emerson College in Boston, Massachusetts where he was awarded an Honorary Doctor of Law degree in May 1991, and in October 2019 he was appointed to their board of advisors. He is a member of the international honor society Beta Gamma Sigma.

== Career ==
=== United Artists ===
Solomon began his career in film distribution with United Artists (UA) in 1956 at the age of 18, loading films on trucks destined for theatres in New York and New Jersey, while attending the NYU School of Commerce (now Stern School of Business). In January 1960 at age 21, UA sent him to Panama to open the Central American territory for American films, traveling to Guatemala, Nicaragua, Honduras, Costa Rica, and Salvador. A year later he was assigned to Bogota, Colombia and when he was 24 he became manager of Peru and Bolivia, where he lived for two years.

=== MCA (now NBCUniversal) ===
After 8 years with United Artists, MCA (now Comcast, Universal, and NBC) hired Solomon to start their Latin American TV division. He opened their offices while residing in Mexico City and Brazil, and put most of the TV stations on the air in Latin America. After several years, he moved back to New York and conducted international business in the Middle East, Europe, Asia, Africa as well as Latin America. He became a vice president at MCA at 30 years old. He spent 14 years at MCA.

=== Telepictures ===
In 1978 Solomon co-founded Telepictures Corporation and served as its chairman and CEO. Telepictures grew to become one of the largest U.S. television syndication companies at that time, and one of the largest international distribution companies. The company created television syndication with the series The People’s Court, which is still on the air after 35 years. Telepictures was the owner and operator of six television stations in the U.S. (one in Puerto Rico), and the publisher of six magazines, including US magazine (now US Weekly), which they bought out of bankruptcy with Jann Wenner, co-founder of Rolling Stone. He was also the first international distributor of The Grammys, MTV, and E! Entertainment Television (more commonly known as E!).

=== Lorimar-Telepictures ===
In 1985 Telepictures merged with Lorimar to form Lorimar-Telepictures Corporation. Solomon became the new company's president and served on its board of directors. During his tenure, Lorimar-Telepictures became the largest television production and distribution company in the U.S., producing major television series such as Dallas, Falcon Crest, Knots Landing, and ALF among others. These series were produced at the Lorimar-Telepictures Studios, (formerly MGM Studios), which is now Sony Pictures Entertainment.

=== Warner Bros. Television ===
In 1989, Lorimar-Telepictures was acquired by Warner Bros. Solomon became President of Warner Bros. International Television, where he oversaw sales and marketing operations for television cable and satellite companies outside of the U.S. Solomon expanded international telecommunications interests by opening up China, Russia, India and other third world countries to American produced content. Solomon is a co-founder of HBO OLE (now Ole Communications). He also co-founded the first satellite-delivered station in Scandinavia (SF Succe).

=== Solomon International Enterprises ===
In 1994, following his tenure at Warner Bros., Solomon began his own television communications company, Solomon Entertainment Enterprises. He distributed independent TV product to the international market and formed a partnership with Canal +, France and UFA, Germany to produce TV movies. Solomon also partnered with Shanghai Media Group Broadband(SMGBB) to introduce Chinese content to the U.S.

=== Truli Media Group ===
In 2010, Truli Media Group Inc. was founded by Solomon. Truli is a digital aggregator of content focusing on family and faith. The company was acquired by Chicken Soup for the Soul Entertainment in May, 2018.

=== Digital Content International ===
In June 2017, Solomon founded Digital Content International (DCI). DCI is a global aggregator of original and licensed video content that is distributed to terrestrial and digital networks worldwide.

=== Involvy AB ===
Solomon has been a founder and chairman of Involvy AB since January 2018. It is an advisory firm based in Sweden with consultants in different European countries and in the U.S., and partners with developing companies to nurture growth and support expansion. Involvy AB contributes with its professional skills and international network, working on projects involving partnerships and investments to push growth and sustainability.

=== Back to Space ===
Solomon has joined the board of advisors of a new venture, Back to Space. The goal of the company is to inspire and enhance an interest in science, engineering and space, by constructing a high-tech lunar landscape experience facility in Texas. This facility will have the ability to simulate riding in a rocket, landing on the Moon, and experiencing a walk on the Moon's surface.

=== Chicken Soup for the Soul Entertainment ===
In 2021, Solomon became a senior advisor to Chicken Soup for the Soul Entertainment Inc., one of the largest operators of streaming advertising-supported video-on-demand (AVOD) networks. Mr. Solomon assisted Chicken Soup for the Soul Entertainment in various business functions, including program library and company acquisitions, co-production financing, as well as sales and other activities, with a focus on assisting the company with respect to its global AVOD rollout.

=== Foton Ventures ===
Appointed Senior Advisor to Foton Ventures, an investment and asset management company focused on content, intellectual property and tech, offering their partners a unique opportunity for commercial success in media and entertainment.

=== V Channels ===
Appointed Senior Advisor to V Channels, a Los Angeles based company, distributing films in AVOD and YouTube platforms, currently exploring potential acquisitions.

=== GFM Animation ===
Appointed senior advisor to GFM Animation, a UK company that co-produces and distributes animation content aimed for family audiences.

In April 2024 Solomon was instrumental in the formation of a partnership between GFM and Kartoon Studios, Inc. (now a senior advisor), the controlling partner of Stan Lee Universe, LLC., to develop, finance and produce five animated feature films featuring stories and characters created by comic-book legend Stan Lee. GFM has assembled a team of LA-based writers with previous experience of Marvel projects to develop scripts while working alongside Kartoon Studios and the GFM team in London, for presentation to distributors.

=== Phantom Space Corporation ===
In 2024, Michael Solomon was appointed Executive Vice President and Chairman of the Board of Advisors to Phantom Space, a company founded in 2019. It became the first 100% U.S. based satellite supply chain, in an effort to mass produce rockets on a large scale. In March 2024 the company began building a two-stage rocket named Daytona. The first launch scheduled for 2025, will take Daytona into low Earth orbit.

=== Additional media interests ===
Solomon was founder and owner of Prime Time Communications in Spain and Romania, and a co-owner of Iguana Productions in Peru. Later he co-owned a TV and feature film production company in India (Armitraj-Solomon) and France, Spain and Romania. He also owned a TV network in Peru.

=== Professional honors and awards ===
Solomon was presented the Jerusalem Award in 1989, by the Honorable Howard L. Berman, a member of the US House of Representatives. He received this award for work with the Shaare Zedek Medical Center's Pediatric department, where he raised one million dollars at a dinner honoring him. The center's charter is to provide medical care to the people of Israel regardless of race, religion, color, age or ability to pay.

Solomon served on the board of overseers of New York University Stern School of Business for 33 years, was a special advisor to the president of Emerson College in Boston and is on their board of advisors.

He is a founder of The Sam Spiegel Film and Television School in Jerusalem, and was founding chairman of The Jerusalem Foundation of the West Coast of the United States, raising millions of dollars for the City of Jerusalem. He is also the honorary chairman of the Actors Equity of China, being the first American to ever hold this post. Solomon served on the Entertainment Business & Management Advisory Board at UCLA. He also served on the board of the International Council of the National Academy of Television Arts and the group that awards International Emmy Awards, and on the board of the USC Annenberg School of Communication & Journalism/London School of Economics Communication Degree Program. Solomon is a founder of the American Film Market Association (AFM). AFM is a network of acquisition and development executives from more than 70 countries that meet once a year to sell, finance and acquire films. In March 2013 he was nominated to receive the annual Ellis Island Medal of Honor.

== Personal life ==
Solomon was married to Barbara Gottlieb from 1968 to 1976 and they had one son, Lee, born in 1972. In 1979, Solomon married Luciana Paluzzi. Paluzzi is an Italian actress who is best known for playing Fiona Volpe, a SPECTRE operative and the villainess in the 1965 James Bond film Thunderball. The two reside in Los Angeles, CA, where they have been living for over 40 years. Paluzzi has a son, Christian, from her previous marriage, who Solomon adopted, and together they have five grandchildren.

== Philanthropic activities ==
Solomon is a member of the executive committee of Working Nation (https://www.WorkingNation.org). This is a nonprofit media company focused on the future of work and how corporations, governments, nonprofits, and educational institutions are working to close the job skills jap that is threatening to disrupt our economy. Solomon co-founded and was chairman of The Careyes Clinic in Jalisco, Mexico. The clinic serves approximately 7000 people in the local community and other surrounding areas. He has also been on the board of The Jeffrey Modell Foundation in New York for the past 30 years.
