= David Salzman =

American television producer

- Born: December 1, 1943 (age 82); Brooklyn, New York, U.S.
- Occupation: Television producer
- Years active: 1960s–present

David Elliot Salzman (born December 1, 1943) is an American television producer and businessman. Salzman has been involved in a number of industries that include television news and entertainment, feature films, live theater, sports, and musical events.

== Early life ==
Salzman was raised in Brooklyn, New York. He earned his college degree from Brooklyn College, during which he had a stint at The New York Times. He was accepted into the Columbia University Graduate School of Journalism. After speaking with numerous journalists, he was dissuaded from attending Columbia due to "the declining nature of the business". He decided to attend the Mass communications program at Wayne State University.

== Career ==
=== The Lou Gordon Show ===
Salzman's career in the entertainment industry started during his years at Wayne State when he was a producer on the popular Detroit television talk program, The Lou Gordon Show, on Channel 50. Salzman wrote, produced, booked guests, and even did makeup; the show attracted many big celebrities. An interview with Michigan Governor George Romney inadvertently ended Romney's presidential campaign in 1968.

=== KDKA (first stint) ===
After, Salzman joined Group W, and moved up the ranks beginning with the CBS affiliate KDKA in Pittsburgh as news director from 1970 to 1972.

=== KYW ===
Later in 1972, Salzman moved to Philadelphia, where he became the station manager at KYW. During his time as station manager, he was an executive producer on The Mike Douglas Show.

=== KDKA (second stint) ===
In 1974, he moved back to Pittsburgh to become the general manager of KDKA until 1975.

=== Group W Productions ===
Salzman was elevated to Group W Productions headquarters in New York City and was named chairman of the board. He launched the syndicated strip programs Everyday and The Peter Marshall Show while running Group W.

=== NIWS ===
He moved to Los Angeles in 1978 and left Group W to create NIWS (News Informational Weekly Service), a nationally syndicated news service. NIWS ran in over 200 domestic markets, providing pre-packaged human interest news stories that subscriber stations could incorporate into their local broadcasts. Salzman quickly became a pioneer in the news industry.

=== Telepictures ===
Salzman joined the nascent company Telepictures as a partner with Michael Garin and Michael Solomon. At Telepictures, they acquired syndicated television rights to older programs such as My Favorite Martian, Here's Lucy, and the Rankin-Bass library of stop-motion animated television specials, and would sell them both domestically and internationally. Telepictures quickly moved into original production with syndicated mainstays Love Connection, and the original The People's Court with Judge Joseph Wapner. Television movies and miniseries production followed, with notable productions such as Murder in Texas and World War III.

=== Lorimar-Telepictures ===
In 1985, Salzman and Telepictures acquired Lorimar. With Lorimar-Telepictures, Salzman assumed the office of the president and ran the first-run and syndication television production units. Including existing hit drama shows that Lorimar had already created (Dallas, Knots Landing, and Falcon Crest), Lorimar-Telepictures remained relevant in the industry by going on to produce new situation comedies such as Full House, The Hogan Family, ALF, and Perfect Strangers. These series were produced at the Lorimar-Telepictures Studios (formerly MGM Studios), which is now Sony Pictures Entertainment.

=== Warner Bros. buyout ===
In 1989, Lorimar-Telepictures was acquired by Warner Bros. Salzman became President of Warner Bros. Television, where he also oversaw sales and marketing operations for television cable and satellite companies outside of the U.S. Warner Bros. expanded international telecommunications interests. In 1990, he left Lorimar Television to start Millennium Productions, which was eventually renamed to David Salzman Entertainment, pooling the resources of affiliated production houses Lorimar Television and Telepictures Productions. Under his watch, he produced The Jenny Jones Show, and the CBS show Dark Justice.

=== Quincy Jones-David Salzman Entertainment ===
Still under the Warner banner, Salzman co-founded Quincy Jones-David Salzman Entertainment with Quincy Jones, which produced well-known shows such as Fresh Prince of Bel-Air, Their Eyes Were Watching God, and In the House. In 1995, Salzman and Jones produced the 1996 Academy Awards. In 1996, Salzman was an Executive Producer on the Academy Award-nominated short-film Brooms. In the following year, Salzman produced the movie Steel starring NBA legend Shaquille O'Neal. Salzman has produced more than 15,000 hours of television, including fifteen seasons of MADtv. In addition, Salzman has been nominated for two Primetime Emmy Awards, one Daytime Emmy, and two Writers Guild of America Awards. Salzman also produced the 1993 Clinton Presidential Inauguration event at the Lincoln Memorial with Jones, along with the Concert of the Americas. With Jones, Salzman also co-owned Vibe and Spin Magazine. In 1997, both Jones and Salzman part ways, with Salzman starting David Salzman Enterprises on its own. On March 1, 2000, he joined Enigma Digital as a member of the board of directors.

=== Television stations ===
In a return to his roots, Salzman has co-owned several television stations. Early on in his career, Salzman sold a license for a WB station in Syracuse. Soon after, Salzman founded and owned KCWE in Kansas City and co-founded and co-owned WBWB in Louisville. He also oversaw the station group for the minority-run QWEST Broadcasting Stations with partners Sonia Salzman, Geraldo Rivera, Willie Davis, Don Cornelius, and Tribune Media. In addition to this, he also owned WATL in Atlanta, KMID in Midland, WSPR in Springfield, and WNOL in New Orleans, which he eventually sold the license to News Corp.

=== AMGEN Tour of California ===
In 2006, Salzman co-founded the AMGEN Tour of California. The Tour of California is the only event on the top-level World Tour in the United States and is America's largest professional cycling event.

== Filmography ==
Year	Title	Role
1961–1981	The Mike Douglas Show	executive producer
1965–1977	The Lou Gordon Show	producer
1976–1977	The Peter Marshall Variety Show	executive producer
1978	Everyday	executive producer
1978–1991	Dallas	Oversaw Production as chairman and president of Lorimar Telepictures
1979–1984	Real People	Oversaw Production as chairman and president of Lorimar Telepictures
1979–1993	Knots Landing	Oversaw Production as chairman and President of Lorimar Telepictures
1981–1993	The People's Court	Oversaw Production as chairman and President of Lorimar Telepictures
1981–1990	Falcon Crest	Oversaw Production as chairman and President of Lorimar Telepictures
1983–1994	Love Connection	Oversaw Production as chairman and President of Lorimar Telepictures
1986–1990	ALF	Oversaw Production as chairman and President of Lorimar Telepictures
1986–1991	The Hogan Family	Oversaw Production as chairman and President of Lorimar Telepictures
1986–1993	Perfect Strangers	Oversaw Production as chairman and President of Lorimar Telepictures
1987–1988	Max Headroom	Oversaw Production as chairman and President of Lorimar Telepictures
1987–1989	She's the Sheriff	Oversaw Production as chairman and President of Lorimar Telepictures
1987–1995	Full House	Oversaw Production as chairman and President of Lorimar Telepictures
1988	Aaron's Way	Oversaw Production as chairman and President of Lorimar Telepictures
1988–1991	Midnight Caller	Oversaw Production as chairman and President of Lorimar Telepictures
1990	Trump Card	Oversaw Production as chairman and President of Lorimar Telepictures
1990–1996	The Fresh Prince of Bel-Air	producer
1991	The Jesse Jackson Show	executive producer
1991–1993	Dark Justice	executive producer
1991–1998	Step by Step	Oversaw Production as chairman and President of Lorimar Telepictures
1991–2003	The Jenny Jones Show	executive producer
1993	1993 Presidential Inauguration	executive producer
1993	A Cool Like That Christmas	executive producer
1994	Concert of the Americas	executive producer
1994	On Trial	executive producer, writer
1994	The Roots of Country: Nashville Celebrates the Ryman	executive producer
1995	The History of Rock 'n' Roll	executive producer
1995–1999	In the House	executive producer
1996	The 68th Annual Academy Awards	producer
1996	Brooms	executive producer
1997	Steel	producer
1997	Lost on Earth	executive producer
1997–1998	Vibe	executive producer
1997–2016	MADtv	executive producer
1999	Passing Glory	executive producer
2002	The Rerun Show	executive producer
2003	Vacuums	executive producer
2005	Their Eyes Were Watching God	co-executive producer
2016	MADtv 20th Anniversary Reunion	executive producer
