= The Klansman =

1974 film by Terence Young

- Directed by: Terence Young
- Written by: Millard Kaufman; Samuel Fuller
- Based on: The Klansman; 1967 novel by William Bradford Huie
- Produced by: William D. Alexander
- Starring: Lee Marvin; Richard Burton; Cameron Mitchell; Lola Falana; Luciana Paluzzi; David Huddleston; Linda Evans; O. J. Simpson
- Cinematography: Lloyd Ahern
- Edited by: Gene Milford
- Music by: Stu Gardner; Dale O. Warren
- Distributed by: Paramount Pictures
- Release date: October 25, 1974
- Running time: 112 minutes
- Language: English
- Budget: $5 million

The Klansman (also known as Burning Cross) is a 1974 American drama film based on the 1967 novel of the same name by William Bradford Huie. It was directed by Terence Young and starred Lee Marvin, Richard Burton, Cameron Mitchell, Lola Falana, Luciana Paluzzi, David Huddleston, Linda Evans and O. J. Simpson in his feature film debut.

== Plot ==
In a small town in Alabama, Sheriff Track Bascomb breaks up a crowd of hillbilly white men molesting a black woman. Owing his election to the racist power structure that runs the community, Bascomb arrests no one. His decision is also based on the fact that he loves the town he grew up in and wants to keep the peace. In addition, his best friend since school days is Breck Stancill: a rich landowner who sympathizes with the Civil Rights movement. Despite their political differences, however, the bond shared by Bascomb and Stencill remains strong.

Later, the town's relative tranquility is threatened when a young white woman, Nancy Poteet, is sexually assaulted and beaten by a black man. Sheriff Bascomb tries to find the guilty party while Ku Klux Klan members – including Bascomb's deputy, Butt Cutt Cates – take matters into their own hands. They board a truck and drive to a rural bar frequented by black people. They chase after two men outside, one of whom is Garth. Garth escapes but his companion Henry is captured, castrated, and shot-gunned by the Klan. Witnessing his friend's torture and death, Garth swears vengeance and embarks on a one-man terror campaign against the Klan and their supporters.

Loretta Sykes, a black woman who grew up in the town, returns home. She is approached by members of the Civil Rights movement. Together, they try to get Breck Stancill involved. One evening, Loretta is abducted by Deputy Cates and his Klan allies. In response to the assault on Nancy, it is decided that one of them should rape Loretta. So violent is the act that she almost bleeds to death. As a result, what Sheriff Bascomb tried to prevent from the very beginning now boils to the surface, and an all-out race war threatens to rip his town apart.

== Cast ==
- Lee Marvin as Sheriff Track Bascomb
- Richard Burton as Breck Stancill
- Cameron Mitchell as Butt Cutt Cates
- O. J. Simpson as Garth
- Lola Falana as Loretta Sykes
- David Huddleston as Mayor Hardy Riddle
- Linda Evans as Nancy Poteet
- Luciana Paluzzi as Trixie
- David Ladd as Flagg
- John Alderson as Vernon Hodo
- John Pearce as Taggart
- Virgil Frye as Johnson
- Larry Williams as Rodney "Lightning Rod"
- Jean Bell as Mary Anne
- Wendell Wellman as Alan Bascomb

== Development ==
The novel by William Bradford Huie was published in 1967. Film rights were purchased by the Robert Leder Company for $100,000. Originally TV director Don Stewart was meant to direct and Chuck Connors was going to star as Sheriff Track Bascomb.

Film rights were bought by a black film producer, William D. Alexander, who formed a company, The Movie People, to make the film and reportedly spent a year putting it together. Bill Schiffrin, who sometimes acted as Samuel Fuller's agent, said he put the film together. The first draft of the script was done by Fuller, and it was rewritten by Millard Kaufman. Schiffrin says Kaufman "distorted" much of what the former wrote. "I wanted Fuller", he said.

Schiffrin says Terence Young was hired as director at the insistence of the European investors. Young was best known for his work on the James Bond films. In a bit of stunt casting, he hired Luciana Paluzzi, who had played Bond villain Fiona Volpe in Thunderball, as Trixie in this film. The studio had American Joanna Moore dub in Paluzzi's lines. Schiffrin says he wanted Moore to play Paluzzi's role originally. "I never thought an Italian should play a Southern girl." "The day Young was hired I should've left the show", said Schiffrin. "Four times during filming I wasn't speaking to Young." Fuller claimed Paramount had a prior commitment with Italian partners as a payback for a prior deal and when Young came on the film Fuller walked off the project

Alexander obtained a $1 million guarantee from Paramount. The rest was raised from various banks and tax shelters in the US and Europe. Richard Burton was to be paid $40,000 a week for ten weeks work plus a percentage. Lee Marvin got 10% of the profits.

== Production ==
Although O.J. Simpson appeared in an unreleased 1973 film called Why?, this film marks his acting debut.

Filming took place in Oroville, California, about 60 miles north of Sacramento. Burton and wife Elizabeth Taylor stayed in a rented house in town. "It's enchanting here", Burton told the press during filming. "It reminds me of my old valley in Wales."

Richard Burton allegedly drank so much alcohol during the making of this film that many of his scenes had to be shot with him seated or lying down due to his inability to stand. In some scenes, he appears to slur his words or speak incoherently. Burton later said that he could not remember making the film. Simpson said "There would be times when he couldn't move." Marvin was also a heavy drinker at this time, to the point where Burton claimed in a 1977 interview that when the two men ran into each other at a party years later neither could remember working together. At the time of the film, Burton was suffering from depression and sciatica, both debilitating conditions. He later credited Marvin with saving his life. "I wouldn't have survived without Marvin," he told the actor and writer Michael Munn. Lee Marvin saw that Burton "was drinking not for pleasure of it but because he had a great need, and I doubt he knew what that was himself. Maybe it was for Elizabeth. But whatever it was, he was in pain, and he drank to kill that pain. I used to do it too."

Burton gave a young woman in town, Kim Dinucci, a $450 diamond ring and arranged for her to get a small walk-on part in the film as Bascomb (Marvin)'s daughter. This made national news.

During Breck Stancill (Burton)'s death scene, he was lying on the set when the director Young said that the make-up artist had prepared him well for the scene, only for the artist to remark that he had not done anything. Young brought a doctor in to examine him when it was determined that he was dying. He was rushed to St. John's Hospital in Santa Monica with a temperature of 104 °F (40 °C) and both kidneys on the point of collapse. He was suffering from influenza and tracheo-bronchitis. He would remain in the hospital for six weeks. Burton went to the hospital after filming and was treated for bronchitis. While he was staying there it was announced Burton and Taylor would be getting divorced.

Walter Schiffrin later said Burton should not have been paid "at all considering the performance he gave. He was... drinking three quarts a day. He didn't know what town he was in, let alone what film" (3 US quarts is about 2.8 liters). Schiffrin says that, in contrast, Marvin "was highly helpful throughout the shooting". Simpson said that despite being incapacitated, Burton "could change the meaning of a scene with just his voice. I studied that. We used to play a game: try to ignore Richard Burton when he's talking. It's impossible".

Aldo Tonti, the cinematographer who had worked on Reflections in a Golden Eye, was also the cinematographer on this film, though he was not credited.

=== Post-production difficulties ===
Lee Marvin later said his character Bascomb was meant to be a war hero and had a son Alan (Wendell Wellman) who did not want to go to West Point. There was a subplot where Stencill sided with Alan. All this was cut from the final film. In addition, Marvin was not paid a final $50,000 owed to him.

While the film was being edited at Samuel Goldwyn Studio, the building caught fire.

At the last minute, one of the investors failed to come up with the money so Marvin and Burton were not paid their full salary and Paramount put a lien on the film.

Fuller said he later met Young when both were members of the Festival du Film Policier de Cognac. Though Fuller originally had a grudge against Young, he was won over by Young's insistence that he had never read the original script and had only accepted the direction of the film to pay debts. Fuller admired his honesty.

== Reception ==
Vincent Canby of The New York Times called it "a thoroughly clumsy adaptation of William Bradford Huie's novel", adding that the filmmakers "effectively defuse the very real drama by so lovingly depicting the horrors that one comes to suspect their motives. As the movie progresses, the events come to seem less and less urgent and particular to a specific time and place, and more and more like the automatic responses to the demands of cheap, easy melodrama." Arthur D. Murphy of Variety declared it "a perfect example of screen trash that almost invites derision ... There's not a shred of quality, dignity, relevance or impact in this yahoo-oriented bunk". Gene Siskel of the Chicago Tribune gave the film one star out of four and called it "a tawdry rip-off of a half-dozen films: In the Heat of the Night, The Liberation of L.B. Jones, tick ... tick ... tick ... what's amazing about this drivel is that Lee Marvin and Richard Burton lent their talents to it. They must have been offered a very sweet deal, because The Klansman is pure demagogery". Charles Champlin of the Los Angeles Times slammed the film as "one of those sleazy, exploitative, incompetent pieces of motion picture waste which makes you suddenly unsure that film reviewing is a fit occupation for a grown man ... If any frame of the film carried a convincing sense of the real tensions, fears, hatreds and tempers of the rural American South you might be able to forgive some of the rest. But the acting is so amateurish in the lesser roles as to be comical and the dialogue in the major roles is unplayable." Gary Arnold of The Washington Post called it "the sort of film that raises only academic questions. Could the original source, a novel by William Bradford Huie, have been as terrible as the movie? Probably not, but it must have given the screenwriters, Millard Kaufman and Sam Fuller, a few ugly situations to kick around, like a castration and a pair of interracial rapes and a shootout with the Ku Klux Klan, and they've proceeded to kick them around like champion Hollywood hacks, leaning hard on the exploitation elements and reducing characterization and social analysis, if there were any, to a bare minimum".

Alexander, Young and Burton were meant to make a film with Robert Mitchum and Charlotte Rampling called Jackpot but it was never finished.

== See also ==
- List of American films of 1974
