= Luciana Paluzzi =

Italian actress (born 1937)

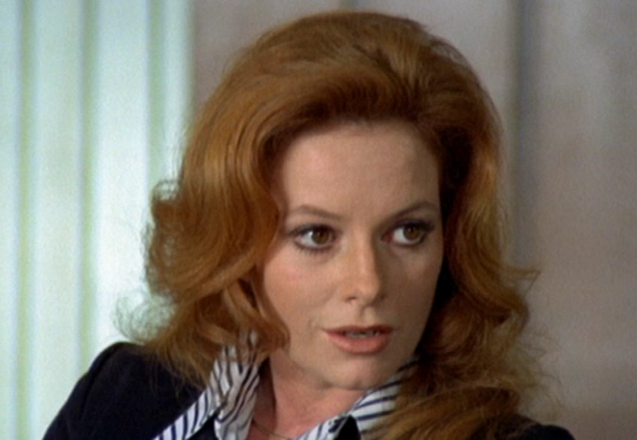
- Paluzzi in the movie The Italian Connection (1972)
- Born: 10 June 1937 (age 89); Rome, Kingdom of Italy
- Occupation: Actress
- Years active: 1953–1978
- Known for: Thunderball; Muscle Beach Party; The Italian Connection; Chuka
- Spouses: Brett Halsey (m. 1960; div. 1962) Michael Jay Solomon (m. 1979)
- Partner(s): Tony Anthony (1960s–1970s)
- Children: 1

Luciana Paluzzi (born 10 June 1937) is an Italian actress. She is perhaps best known for playing SPECTRE assassin Fiona Volpe in the fourth James Bond film, Thunderball (1965), but she had important roles in notable films of the 1960s and 1970s in both the Italian film industry and Hollywood, including Chuka (1967), The Green Slime (1968), 99 Women (1969), Black Gunn (1972), War Goddess (1973), The Klansman (1974) and The Sensuous Nurse (1975).

== Career ==
=== Film ===
Paluzzi was born in Rome and was brought up there. She went to Milan and studied naval engineering for two years at the Scientific Academy of Milan, being the only woman in her class.

One of her first roles was an uncredited walk-on part in Three Coins in the Fountain (1954), which she got by chance through a friend of her father's who was invited for dinner and happened to be looking for a young actress doing a very short two-line role for director Jean Negulesco, thinking Paluzzi might be a fit. Negulesco had not been satisfied with the other actresses so far, but when Paluzzi, who did not plan to become an actress, recited the English line the next day (it was the only English she spoke at that time) she got the role.

Paluzzi went on to appear in many movies, most of which were made in her native Italy. In her early films, she is credited as Luciana Paoluzzi.

In 1957, she came to England to appear in the British war film No Time To Die (also known as Tank Force) alongside Victor Mature where she was directed by Terence Young. She was then cast in the British action drama Sea Fury as the Spanish-born Josita, who is fought over by Stanley Baker and Victor McLaglen's characters.

In 1959, Paluzzi went to Hollywood under contract with Twentieth Century Fox Television to star as a regular in the 20th Century Fox Television series Five Fingers, which was cancelled after three months. Paluzzi then played Rafaella, the wife of Brett Halsey's character Ted Carter, in 1961's Return to Peyton Place.

From 1963 to 1965, Paluzzi almost exclusively appeared in Italian productions.

In 1965, Paluzzi was cast as SPECTRE villainess, Fiona Volpe, "volpe" is "fox" in Italian, in Terence Young's Thunderball (1965), for which she is best known. She had auditioned for the part of the lead Bond girl, Dominetta "Domino" Petacchi, but producers instead cast Claudine Auger, changing the character's name from an Italian to a Frenchwoman, renaming her Dominique Derval. Initially crestfallen when informed she did not get the part, Paluzzi rejoiced when told her consolatory prize was the part of Fiona Volpe, originally planned to be Fiona Kelly, which she said was "more fun" to play. Paluzzi later claimed being a Bond girl was a double-edged sword. In the documentary Bond Girls Are Forever, Paluzzi expressed amazement at the level of fame, publicity, and recognition she received from Thunderball; but as a result of being in such an outlandish film, she felt she was taken less seriously as an actress when returning to the Italian film industry.

Paluzzi appeared in such films as Muscle Beach Party (1964) and Chuka (1967). She co-starred in the 1969 women in prison film 99 Women, and as a Southern belle in the 1974 Hollywood drama The Klansman (with her voice dubbed by American actress Joanna Moore), again for Terence Young.

=== Television ===
In 1959–60, Paluzzi appeared with David Hedison in the short-lived espionage television series, Five Fingers. She appeared with Tab Hunter in an episode of The Tab Hunter Show in 1960. In 1962 she played a murderous wife in an episode of Thriller titled "Flowers of Evil". In 1964 she played the villainess in an episode of The Man from U.N.C.L.E., as the seductive THRUSH agent Angela in the first-season episode "The Four Steps Affair" and in the movie version of the show's pilot episode, To Trap a Spy. In 1966 she played Baroness Carla Montaglia in Season 3, Episode 3 "Face of a Shadow" in Twelve O'Clock High. Also in 1966, she played Greek bar owner Tuesday Hajadakis in the premiere episode of The Girl from U.N.C.L.E. . In 1967 she played the seductive foreign agent Marla Valemska in "Matchless," the premiere episode of Mr. Terrific. In 1971 Paluzzi appeared as a special guest star in "Powderkeg," the pilot movie for the CBS TV series, Bearcats!. In 1978 she portrayed journalist Liana Labella in the Hawaii Five-O episode "My Friend, the Enemy". Also starred in Bonanza, 'The Dowry', in 1962.

== Personal life ==
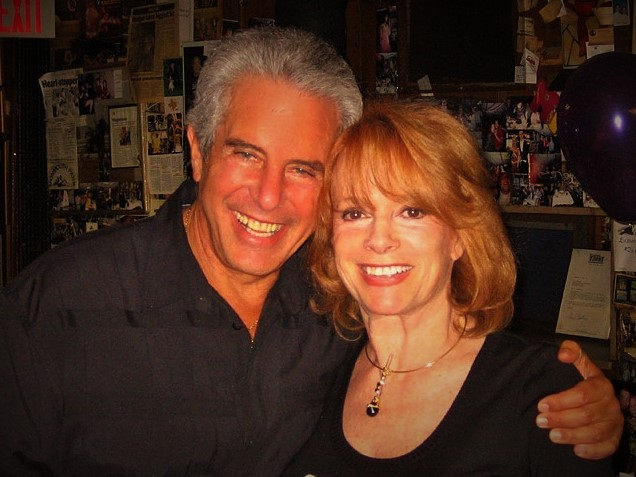
Paluzzi with husband Michael Jay Solomon (2016)

In 1960, Paluzzi married actor Brett Halsey, who had just left his marriage with Renate Hoy, an actress and Miss Germany of 1954. The two co-starred as a newlywed couple in the film, Return to Peyton Place. The couple had one son, Christian, and after they divorced in 1962 Halsey married Heidi Brühl.

During the 1960s and 1970s, Paluzzi had a long-term relationship with Tony Anthony, with whom she appeared in the films Wounds of Hunger and Come Together. Her work in Japan on The Green Slime inspired Anthony to write and produce the hybrid Spaghetti Western-jidaigeki film The Silent Stranger.

In 1979, Paluzzi married her current husband, American media mogul Michael Jay Solomon, who had founded Michael Jay Solomon Film International in 1977, co-founded Telepictures Corporation in 1978 and in 1985 became president of Warner Bros. International Television, and she moved to New York to live with her husband. The marriage caused her to end her film career. In 1980, she became sales representative of Canale 5 and it:Reteitalia in the United States, which she characterized as a very quiet job, and followed her husband on his international travels.

Paluzzi and her husband also resided at an exclusive clifftop estate on the Pacific Ocean in Jalisco, Mexico, known as "Casa Dos Estrellas". The couple sold that estate in about 2005 to live in New York and Rome, to be close to family.

== Selected filmography ==
- Sua altezza ha detto: no! (1953) – Nanú
- Three Coins in the Fountain (1954) – Angela Bianchi (uncredited)
- My Seven Little Sins (1954) – Pat
- Il vetturale del Moncenisio (1954)
- Adriana Lecouvreur (1955)
- Faccia da mascalzone (1956)
- The Lebanese Mission (1956) – Michèle Hennequin
- Mademoiselle Striptease (1956) – Sophia
- Guaglione (1956) – Marisa's Friend
- La donna che venne dal mare (1957)
- Hercules (1958) – Luciana Paoluzzi
- No Time to Die (1958) – Carola
- Si le roi savait ça (1958)
- Sea Fury (1958) – Josita
- The Tiger of Eschnapur (1959) – Bharani – Seetha's servant
- Carlton-Browne of the F.O. (1959) – Her Serene Highness Princess Ilyena
- My Wife's Enemy (1959) – Giulia
- Return to Peyton Place (1961) – Raffaella
- Bonanza (1962, Episode: "The Dowry") – Michele Dubois
- The Reluctant Saint (1962) – Carlotta (scenes deleted)
- Vice and Virtue (1963) – Héléna
- Wounds of Hunger (1963) – Estela
- Burke's Law (1964, Episode: "Who killed Marty Kelso") – Mia Bandini
- Hazel (TV series) (1964, Episode: "Arrivederci, Mr. B.") - Carla
- To Trap a Spy (1964) – Angela (archive footage)
- Muscle Beach Party (1964) – Julie
- Questa volta parliamo di uomini (1965) – Manuela (segment "Un uomo d'onore")
- I Kill, You Kill (1965) – La mamma (segment "Giochi acerbi")
- Thunderball (1965) – Fiona Volpe
- The Venetian Affair (1966) – Giulia Almeranti
- The One Eyed Soldiers (1966) – Gava Berens
- Chuka (1967) – Veronica Kleitz
- The Green Slime (1968) – Dr. Lisa Benson
- OSS 117 – Double Agent (1968) – Maud, a female doctor
- A Black Veil for Lisa (1968) – Lisa
- La esclava del paraíso (1968) – Mizziana
- 1001 Nights (1968) – Mizziana
- 99 Women (1969) – Natalie Mendoza
- Carnal Circuit (1969) – Mary Sullivan
- The Forgotten Pistolero (1969) – Anna Carrasco
- Playgirl 70 (1969) – Luisa
- Captain Nemo and the Underwater City (1969) – Mala
- Il segreto dei soldati di argilla (1970)
- The Man Who Came from Hate (1971) – Theresa
- Come Together (1971) – Lisa
- Il sergente Klems (1971) – Frida
- The Two Faces of Fear (1972) – Elena Carli
- Colpo grosso... grossissimo... anzi probabile (1972) – Jacqueline
- The Italian Connection (1972) – Eva Lalli
- Black Gunn (1972) – Toni
- Tragic Ceremony (1972) – Lady Alexander
- Medusa (1973) – Sarah
- The Great Kidnapping (1973) – Renata Boletti
- War Goddess (1973) – Phaedra
- Mean Mother (1974) – Therese
- The Klansman (1974) – Trixie
- La sbandata (1974) – Rosa – wife of Raffaele
- Manhunt in the City (1975) – Vera Vannucchi
- Calling All Police Cars (1975) – Ispettrice Giovanna Nunziante
- The Sensuous Nurse (1975) – Jole Scarpa
- Nick the Sting (1976) – Anna
- Hawaii Five-O (1978) Episode:"My Friend, the Enemy" – Liana Labella
- The Greek Tycoon (1978) – Paola Scotti
- Deadly Chase (1978) – Rosy (final film role)
