= Lorimar Television =

American entertainment company (1969–1993)

- Final logo, used from 1988 to 1993
- Formerly: Lorimar Productions, Inc. (1969–1986)
- Type: Subsidiary
- Industry: Entertainment
- Founded: February 1, 1969; 57 years ago
- Founders: Irwin Molasky; Merv Adelson; Lee Rich
- Defunct: December 1, 1993; 32 years ago
- Fate: Folded into Warner Bros. Television
- Successors: Warner Bros. Television Studios (television); Warner Bros. Pictures (film); Warner Home Video (home video)
- Headquarters: 10202 West Washington Boulevard, Culver City, California, U.S.
- Products: Television and film production
- Parent: Lorimar-Telepictures (1985–1988); Warner Bros. Television (1988–1993)

Lorimar Television (formerly Lorimar Productions, Inc. and Lorimar Distribution, commonly known as Lorimar) was an American production company that was later a subsidiary of Warner Bros. It was active from February 1, 1969 until December 1, 1993, when it was folded into Warner Bros. Television. The company was founded by Irwin Molasky, Merv Adelson, and Lee Rich. The brand was a portmanteau of the name of Adelson's then-wife, Lori, and Palomar Airport, in San Diego.

== History ==
=== Early years and merger with Telepictures (1969–1986) ===
In the late 1960s, Lorimar Productions was founded with the aid of a bank loan of $185,000 from Adelson. Prior to Lorimar, Rich had an established reputation first as an advertising executive at Benton & Bowles, then as a television producer, co-producing (with Walter Mirisch) successful series such as The Rat Patrol.

Lorimar initially produced made-for-television movies for the ABC Movie of the Week. Rich bought the script to an adaptation of Earl Hamner Jr.'s novel The Homecoming and subsequently sold the rights to CBS. The Homecoming: A Christmas Story, airing during the 1971 holiday season, was a ratings success, and served as the pilot for Lorimar's first major hit, The Waltons, which premiered in 1972. Throughout the 1970s, Lorimar produced a number of hit shows, including Eight Is Enough; of these, the most popular by far was Dallas.

Logo used from 1978 to 1986

Lorimar's operations gradually expanded, first with a syndication unit. In late 1978, Lorimar Productions and United Artists (UA) entered into a partnership; UA distributed Lorimar-produced films, while Lorimar sought to adapt UA properties into television series. However, nothing would come of the latter, and UA's distribution deal with Lorimar ended in 1980. In 1980, Lorimar purchased the Allied Artists Pictures Corporation library.

In the 1984–85 season, three of the top 10 shows in the United States were produced by Lorimar; Dallas, Knots Landing, and Falcon Crest. In the mid-1980s, Lorimar's output swung toward family-friendly sitcoms; among these were The Hogan Family (initially titled Valerie), Perfect Strangers, and Full House, which were produced by Miller-Boyett Productions. 1985 saw a concerted effort to expand into the lucrative field of first-run syndication with the acquisition of Syndivision, whose rights include syndication of The Greatest American Hero and It's a Living, with ultimately aborted plans to tape new episodes of the CBS game show Press Your Luck.

In October 1985, Lorimar, as part of their first-run syndication expansion, announced it would merge with television syndication firm Telepictures, becoming Lorimar-Telepictures. That same year Lorimar announced their intention to buy a 15% share in the then-financially troubled Warner Communications. On February 19, 1986, the Lorimar-Telepictures merger was completed and the company started trading on the New York Stock Exchange as "LT". In 1986 they purchased the Metro-Goldwyn-Mayer (MGM) studio lot in Culver City, as well as the Metrocolor laboratory from Ted Turner. L-T turned around and sold off the Metrocolor facility to Technicolor for $60 million. Around that same year, Rich left the company and moved to MGM.

=== Purchase by Warner Communications and consolidation with Warner Bros. Television (1987–1993) ===
In 1987, Lorimar-Telepictures's production arm became Lorimar Television and the L-T distribution business was rebranded as Lorimar Syndication. This was part of a strategy where the Lorimar name would be used as an operating name for all of L-T's business units. Plans were announced for a television series based on TV Guide magazine, but these plans did not come to fruition (TV Guide would come to television in 1999, when the Prevue Channel was rebranded as the TV Guide Channel).

In June 1988, Lorimar was purchased by Warner Communications, which in 1990 merged with Time Inc. to form Time Warner. Lorimar's distribution business was folded into Warner Bros. Television Distribution and became Warner Bros. Domestic Television Distribution; since then, the Telepictures name has been resurrected as both a production company (circa 1990), and once again as a syndication company (1995).

The former MGM studio lot was sold to Sony to house Columbia Pictures, TriStar Pictures, and Sony's other operations towards the end of 1989 with the facilities renamed as Columbia Studios (now Sony Pictures Studios) at the beginning of 1990. In 1990, David Salzman left Lorimar to start Millennium Productions, an independent production company allied with Warner Bros. In 1991, after Orion Pictures shut down its television unit, Gary Nardino moved to Lorimar, taking some Orion-produced shows and talent deals (Thomas Carter, Robert Townsend, Paul Stojanovich, Clifton Campbell and Deborah Joy LeVine) with them. In 1992, Barbara Corday, former CBS executive, struck a deal with the studio.

Lorimar continued as a production company until September 1993, when it was eventually consolidated into Warner Bros. Television, primarily for economic reasons. The last series to premiere under the Lorimar name was Time Trax, as part of the Prime Time Entertainment Network programming block. Several shows slated to be Lorimar productions, such as Lois & Clark: The New Adventures of Superman, Living Single, It Had to Be You, Café Americain, The Trouble with Larry, Against the Grain and Family Album ended up being produced by Warner Bros.

Les Moonves, who would later become the chairman and CEO of CBS Corporation, was the president and CEO of Lorimar Television from 1990 to 1993. Moonves then became the chairman of Warner Bros. Television after the merger with Lorimar.

Additionally, Lorimar owned key components of the film library of the defunct Allied Artists film studio (originally Monogram Pictures), which includes Cabaret and Papillon; these, too, are now owned by Warner. After the merger with Telepictures, they also took possession of the Rankin/Bass Animated Entertainment animation house, along with the post-1973 library of that company, including its entry into the 1980s animation market, ThunderCats, which ran until 1989; a Warner Bros. Animation-produced revival show aired on Cartoon Network for one season in 2011.

== Other ventures ==
=== Theatrical films ===
Lorimar was not restricted to producing television programs. They also sporadically produced theatrical motion pictures, most of which were originally distributed by other studios; these were produced under the banner of Lorimar Motion Pictures (or sometimes Lorimar Pictures). Lorimar's entrance into feature films was predominantly sanctioned by Adelson; Rich was vehemently against it. This asset was among the many factors that led to Rich's exit from the studio in 1986.

Lorimar ended their original distribution pact with United Artists in 1980, soon after purchasing the Allied Artists library, due mainly to dissatisfaction with UA's scattershot marketing of Lorimar productions. Subsequently, much of Lorimar's film output was distributed by either Universal or Paramount domestically. By late 1984, the entire unit began to ramp up operations, including a deal with Sidney Lumet to develop feature films. In 1985, it entered into a partnership with Producers Sales Organization, handling worldwide sales, and 20th Century Fox, which took over North American distribution rights to many of its theatrical films. By 1986, Lorimar Motion Pictures had signed international distribution agreements with a joint venture of TCF and The Walt Disney Company called U.K. Film Distributors in the United Kingdom, France's UGC and German's Neue Constantin Film, along with Toho-Towa in Japan.

In January 1987, the film unit was renamed Lorimar Film Entertainment to coincide with its newly formed in-house distribution unit; this superseded the previous deal with Fox. That year, New Century/Vista Film Co., a joint venture of The Vista Organization and New Century Entertainment, struck a deal with Lorimar for international distribution. Several Vista productions were distributed by Lorimar, including Rented Lips, Pass the Ammo and Fright Night Part II. Lorimar also acquired international theatrical and other ancillary rights to Return of the Living Dead Part II.

In May 1987, Craig Bamgaurten, who had been with Lorimar Motion Pictures since 1984, announced that he would resign his post as president in December, and Peter Chernin took over as president of Lorimar Film Entertainment.

In 1988, following the announcement of L-T's merger with Warner Communications, Lorimar struck a new distribution deal with Warner Bros. This deal effectively ended Lorimar's in-house distribution wing. The theatrical film library of Lorimar was subsequently folded into Warner Bros. Pictures.

Warner Bros. now owns most of Lorimar's catalogue, though a few films remained with their original distributors.

=== Home video ===
In 1984, Lorimar purchased Karl Video Corporation (KVC), the company behind the Jane Fonda's Workout exercise video series. Lorimar continued to license library product (primarily Allied Artists titles) to CBS/Fox Video (as well as sub-labels Key Video and Playhouse Video) for some time.

After the Lorimar buyout, Karl-Lorimar began to expand, first with a deal to distribute movies from Lorimar Motion Pictures. Third-party distribution deals were struck with VCL Communications and De Laurentiis Entertainment Group, while laying groundwork for international expansion that saw Lorimar titles released in the UK through Guild Home Video and The Video Collection (the latter company handling children's titles, including titles from the Scholastic-Lorimar Home Video venture).

In late 1986, a new broadcast-style home video branding, "KLV-TV" (advertised as being "Your Personal Network") was introduced. Other areas of growth included Karl-Lorimar's distribution of the Shades of Love direct-to-video romance series (in cooperation with Canada's Astral Film Enterprises) and Jazzvisions, featuring jazz concerts from Herbie Hancock, Antonio Carlos Jobim, John Scofield, George Duke, Tito Puente and Etta James, as well as a big-band jazz production of Porgy and Bess.

By early 1987, while the company's expansion (including a deal with international film distributor Cinecom Entertainment Group) continued, the relationship between Lorimar and Karl had turned sour, primarily thanks to the division racking up financial losses from failed experiments; as a result, Karl resigned in March 1987 due to violating the company's ethical guidelines. Karl-Lorimar continued to exist under the name Lorimar Home Video, with a new push intended for Lorimar theatrical releases; however, this wouldn't last long, as Lorimar Home Video closed in 1989 following the Warner merger, and was folded into Warner Home Video.

In Australia, Lorimar joined a venture with Village Roadshow to create Roadshow Lorimar Home Video, which distributed movie titles by Lorimar Motion Pictures in that country.

=== Record label ===
In 1979, Lorimar formed Lorimar Records, whose first release was the soundtrack to the film The Fish That Saved Pittsburgh. The label would have very few artists signed to it. It was mainly distributed by Columbia Records, but it was also distributed for one album from The Coyote Sisters by Motown via the Morocco subsidiary. Lorimar Records' final release was the soundtrack to Action Jackson (1988), which in that case was distributed by Atlantic Records.

=== Advertising ===
Lorimar also expanded into advertising during the 1980s; it first acquired Kenyon & Eckhardt, an advertising agency, in 1983. It then acquired Bozell Jacobs in 1985, and merged it with Kenyon to form Bozell, Jacobs, Kenyon & Eckhardt. The firm was renamed to Bozell Worldwide in 1992.

== Filmography ==
=== TV productions ===
Lorimar's TV productions included:

- The Good Life (with Screen Gems, 1971–1972)
- The Waltons (1972–1981)
- Doc Elliot (1973-1974)
- Apple's Way (1974–1975)
- The Runaways (TV film, 1975)
- Sybil (TV film, 1976)
- Helter Skelter (TV miniseries, 1976)
- Eight Is Enough (1977–1981)
- Killer on Board (TV film, 1977)
- Dallas (1978–1991)
- A Question of Guilt (TV film, 1978)
- Kaz (1978–1979)
- The Waverly Wonders (1978)
- Knots Landing (1979–1993)
- Skag (1980)
- Flamingo Road (1980–1982)
- Falcon Crest (1981–1990)
- King's Crossing (1982)
- Boone (1983)
- Just Our Luck (1983)
- Dream House (November 1983-June 1984; Group W Productions produced from April to November 1983)
- Lace (1984)
- Hunter (1984–1991, distribution only until 1988)
- Christopher Columbus (TV miniseries, 1985)
- ThunderCats (1985–1989) (co-produced by Rankin/Bass Animated Entertainment)
- Gulag (1985; co-produced by HBO)
- SilverHawks (1986; co-produced by Rankin/Bass Animated Entertainment)
- Act of Vengeance (1986; co-produced by HBO)
- Love Connection (1986–1993; co-produced by Lorimar Television and distributed by Warner Bros. Television, 1989–1993)
- Mama's Family (1986–1990 version, 1986–1989 distribution only)
- ALF (1986–1990)
- Valerie/The Hogan Family (1986–1991)
- Perfect Strangers (1986–1993)
- The People's Court (1986–1989; distributed by Warner Bros. Television 1989–1993)
- Our House (1986–1988)
- Better Days (1986)
- She's the Sheriff (1987)
- The Comic Strip (1987) (co-produced by Rankin/Bass Animated Entertainment)
- Max Headroom (1987)
- Full House (1987–1993)
- Spies (1987)
- Gumby (1988)
- Midnight Caller (1988–1991)
- Aaron's Way (1988)
- Paradise (1988–1991)
- Freddy's Nightmares (1988–1990)
- Studio 5-B (1989)
- Nearly Departed (1989)
- I Know My First Name Is Steven (1989)
- The People Next Door (1989)
- Island Son (1989–1990)
- Family Matters (1989–1993)
- The Family Man (1990–1991)
- Gabriel's Fire (1990–1991)
- It (TV miniseries, 1990)
- D.E.A. (1990)
- Going Places (1990–1991)
- Doublecrossed (1991; co-production with HBO)
- Dark Justice (1991–1993)
- Reasonable Doubts (1991–1993)
- Sisters (1991–1993)
- Homefront (1991–1993)
- I'll Fly Away (1991–1993)
- Step by Step (1991–1993)
- O Pioneers! (TV film, 1992)
- Bill & Ted's Excellent Adventures (1992)
- To Grandmother's House We Go (TV film, 1992)
- Hangin' with Mr. Cooper (1992–1993)
- The Jackie Thomas Show (1992–1993)
- Time Trax (1993)
- Getting By (1993)
- It Had to Be You (1993)
- Island City (TV film, 1994)

=== Theatrical feature films ===
Most of Lorimar's film and television library, with several exceptions, is now owned by Warner Bros. Several of Lorimar's films are still owned by their original distributors or third parties, which are marked with an asterisk (*).

| Release date | Title | Notes |
|---|---|---|
| February 28, 1971 | The Sporting Club | distributed by Embassy Pictures* |
| July 19, 1972 | The Man | in association with ABC Circle Films; distributed by Paramount Pictures* |
| November 7, 1974 | The Tamarind Seed | in association with ITC Entertainment*; distributed by Avco Embassy Pictures |
| February 9, 1977 | Twilight's Last Gleaming | distributed by Allied Artists; co-production with Bavaria Media GmbH* |
| December 23, 1977 | The Choirboys | distributed by Universal Pictures* |
| June 29, 1978 | Fedora | inherited from Allied Artists, distributed by United Artists; co-produced by Bavaria Media GmbH* |
| October 6, 1978 | Who Is Killing the Great Chefs of Europe? | originally distributed by Warner Bros.; WB summarily relinquished the rights, but reclaimed them after the Lorimar/WB merger |
| August 10, 1979 | Americathon | distributed by United Artists |
| October 16, 1979 | Avalanche Express | distributed by 20th Century Fox |
| November 6, 1979 | The Fish That Saved Pittsburgh | distributed by United Artists |
| December 19, 1979 | Being There | distributed by United Artists; Inducted into the National Film Registry in 2015 |
| February 15, 1980 | Cruising | distributed by United Artists |
| May 23, 1980 | Carny | distributed by United Artists |
| July 18, 1980 | The Big Red One | distributed by United Artists |
| October 30, 1980 | China 9, Liberty 37 | inherited from Allied Artists; festival and television play only |
| March 20, 1981 | The Postman Always Rings Twice | distributed by Paramount Pictures |
| May 5, 1981 | Second-Hand Hearts | distributed by Paramount Pictures |
| June 5, 1981 | The Sea Wolves | distributed by Paramount Pictures |
| July 1, 1981 | S.O.B. | distributed by Paramount Pictures |
| July 30, 1981 | Victory | distributed by Paramount Pictures |
| September 11, 1981 | Night School | distributed by Paramount Pictures |
| February 12, 1982 | Love & Money | distributed by Paramount Pictures |
| May 7, 1982 | Urgh! A Music War | distributed by Filmways |
| August 13, 1982 | An Officer and a Gentleman | co-production with Paramount Pictures* |
| October 8, 1982 | Fast-Walking | distributed by Levitt-Pickman Film Corporation |
| October 8, 1982 | Lookin' to Get Out | distributed by Paramount Pictures |
| October 21, 1983 | The Dead Zone | in silent partnership with Dino De Laurentiis Corporation, distributed by Paramount Pictures, who still owns major rights today* |
| March 16, 1984 | Tank | distributed by Universal Pictures* |
| July 1984 | Scream for Help | |
| July 13, 1984 | The Last Starfighter | distributed by Universal Pictures* |
| January 31, 1986 | Power | distributed by 20th Century Fox |
| June 27, 1986 | American Anthem | distributed by Columbia Pictures |
| August 14, 1986 | The Boy Who Could Fly | distributed by 20th Century Fox |
| December 25, 1986 | The Morning After | distributed by 20th Century Fox |
| September 16, 1987 | In the Mood | a co-production with Kings Road Entertainment |
| September 18, 1987 | Orphans | |
| October 2, 1987 | Big Shots | distributed by 20th Century Fox |
| November 1987 | Hearts of Fire | |
| November 6, 1987 | Made in Heaven | |
| November 11, 1987 | Siesta | U.S. distribution |
| January 15, 1988 | Return of the Living Dead Part II | |
| February 12, 1988 | Action Jackson | |
| April 15, 1988 | Tokyo Pop | distributed by International SpectraFilm |
| April 22, 1988 | World Gone Wild | pickup from Apollo Pictures for U.S. theatrical distribution |
| April 29, 1988 | Two Moon Junction | pickup from DDM Film Corporation for U.S. theatrical distribution; produced with The Samuel Goldwyn Company* |
| September 9, 1988 | Running on Empty | distributed by Warner Bros.* |
| December 21, 1988 | Dangerous Liaisons | distributed by Warner Bros.* |
| October 29, 1988 | Moonwalker | distributed internationally by Warner Bros.* |
| February 24, 1989 | Bert Rigby, You're a Fool | distributed by Warner Bros.* |
| February 24, 1989 | The Toxic Avenger Part II | distributed and co-produced by Troma Entertainment* |
| March 24, 1989 | Dead Bang | distributed by Warner Bros.* |
| April 14, 1989 | See You in the Morning | distributed by Warner Bros.* |
| August 23, 1989 | Cookie | distributed by Warner Bros.* |
| October 20, 1989 | Next of Kin | distributed by Warner Bros.* |
| November 3, 1989 | Second Sight | distributed by Warner Bros.* |
| August 24, 1990 | The Witches | distributed by Warner Bros.* |
