= Love Connection =

American television dating game show

- Genre: Dating game show
- Created by: Eric Lieber
- Directed by: Paul Miller; Deborah Miller; Tom McConnell
- Presented by: Chuck Woolery; Pat Bullard; Andy Cohen
- Announcer: Rod Roddy; Gene Wood; Rich Jeffries; Johnny Gilbert; John Cervenka
- Country of origin: United States
- Original language: English
- No. of seasons: 11 (1983–1994); 1 (1998–1999); 2 (2017–2018)
- No. of episodes: 2,120 (1983–94 and 1998–99 series); 28 (2017 revival); Total: 2,148

Production
- Executive producers: David Salzman (1983–1994); Eric Lieber (1983–1994, 1998–1999); Mike Fleiss (2017–2018); James Breen (2017–2018); Jason Ehrlich (2017–2018); Martin Hilton (2017–2018)
- Producers: Sid Marsh; Tom Weitzel; Louise Brooks; David M. Greenfield; John Ryder
- Production locations: KTTV Metromedia Square, Hollywood, California; (1983–1984); ABC Television Center, Hollywood, California; (1984–1987); TAV Celebrity Theater, Hollywood, California; (1987–1991); Hollywood Center Studios, Hollywood, California; (1991–1994); CBS Television City, Hollywood, California; (2017–2018)
- Camera setup: Multi-camera
- Running time: 21–22 minutes (1983–94 and 1998–99 versions); 44 minutes (2017 version)
- Production companies: Eric Lieber Productions; (1983–1994); PEL Productions; (1998–1999); Telepictures Productions; (1998–1999, 2017–2018); NEXT Entertainment; (2017–2018); Warner Horizon Television; (2017–2018)

Original release
- Network: First-run syndication
- Release: September 19, 1983 – July 1, 1994
- Release: September 21, 1998 – June 25, 1999
- Network: Fox
- Release: May 25, 2017 – September 18, 2018

Love Connection is an American television dating game show. Contestants selected one of three potential dates from a series of videotaped profiles, with a studio audience voting on which of the three partners they found most suitable. Originally hosted by Chuck Woolery, the show debuted in syndication on September 19, 1983, and ended on July 1, 1994, after 2,120 shows.

Reruns aired until September 1995. In 1998, the series was relaunched for one season with Pat Bullard as host. In 2017, the series returned on Fox with Andy Cohen hosting. This second revival ran for two seasons.

== Format ==
Love Connection's main premise was to arrange dates for couples. A guest appeared on the show after going on a date with one of three contestants, having chosen on the basis of the contestants' videotaped profiles. After the date, the televised appearance was scheduled.

Love Connection tapings took place before a live studio audience. Woolery introduced the guest and show excerpts from the three candidates' videos. The studio audience then secretly voted on which candidate they preferred for the guest. In the 1998–99 version, home viewers voted online and were included in the tally. The guest then revealed whom he or she had actually dated, and the date joined the conversation from backstage via closed-circuit television camera.

Woolery led the guest and date to discuss their time together. If they both agreed that the date had been successful, the couple would be reunited onstage. Otherwise, the date's participation in the show ended. Woolery then revealed the vote result. If the guest had a successful date with the vote winner, Woolery congratulated the couple for making a "love connection", and they would usually, but not always, accept the offered prize of a second date at the show's expense.

After a successful date, the guest was always offered another date with that person. However, if the vote winner was one of the other contestants, the guest could choose a date with the vote winner, regardless of the success of the first date. If the guest had already unsuccessfully dated the audience pick, the guest could choose to go on a date with either of the other contestants. If a second date took place, the couple would be invited back for a second interview at a later taping.

Two or three segments usually aired per show. In a variation that aired on Fridays, a bachelor or spinster who had not yet chosen a date made an appearance and allowed the studio audience to make the choice for him or her, based on video excerpts. The couple would report back in the usual fashion several weeks later. If the couple hit it off, they were entitled to a second date at the show's expense. If not, the contestant could choose between the two losing candidates for the second date.

In the 2017 revival, the guest appeared on the show after having gone on a date with each of the three contestants. All three were interviewed from backstage after the video intros and audience vote. This version added a segment where guests and contestants rate their first impressions of each other's looks on a scale of 1–10. Some contestants acknowledged basing this rating, in part, upon factors other than physical looks, such as punctuality or fashion sense.

After the interviews, the guest received an overnight date with the contestant of his or her choice, along with a chance to receive a $10,000 cash prize. In season 1, the guest automatically received the prize if the audience vote matched his or her choice. Otherwise, the guest was given the option to instead spend the overnight date with the vote winner and thereby receive the monetary prize. In season 2, the option to switch was dropped. The guest spent the overnight date with the contestant he or she chose, and the $10,000 prize was awarded if the audience vote matched that choice.

The great majority of contestants in the original series were in their twenties and had never been married. Older never-married, widowed, and divorced, some multiple times, contestants were occasionally selected as well. The relationship status of the contestants was noted on-screen in their profile summary in both syndicated iterations of the show, but is not referenced in the 2017 revival, unless it arises in conversation between the guest, dates, and host.

In the original series, men were paired only with women, and vice versa. The 2017 revival included same-sex pairings. The show paid the expenses incurred on the date, plus $75 for incidentals. The incidental amount was increased to $100 for the 1998–1999 revival. In the 2017 revival, contestants were given $500 for each date.

== Production ==
Love Connection was produced by Eric Lieber Productions in association with and distributed by Telepictures (1983–1986), Lorimar-Telepictures (1986–1989), Lorimar Television (1989–1990), and Warner Bros. Television (1989–1994).

== Legacy ==
As of 1993, among the couples who met on the show, there were 29 marriages, 8 engagements, and 15 children, according to Woolery.

In 1994, in a Daily Variety trade ad promoting the end of the original show's run after 11 seasons, it was stated that there were 35,478 taped interviews, 2,120 episodes, 31 marriages, and 20 children.

=== "Two and two" ===
Woolery created his catch phrase "we'll be back in two and two" on Love Connection, often accompanied by a two-fingered hand gesture. The line referred to the fact that the program would return in two minutes and two seconds, the length of a standard commercial break at the time, including the fade-out and fade-ins bookending each break. Woolery would later used this phrase on other shows he hosted as well.

=== Announcers ===
For the first six seasons, the show was announced by a variety of game show announcing veterans. Rod Roddy announced seasons 1 and 2, with Gene Wood announcing seasons 3 and 4. Rich Jeffries announced season 5, and Johnny Gilbert announced season 6. Starting with season 7, John Cervenka took over as announcer, and stayed in that role until the series concluded, becoming the longest running announcer of the series. John Cervenka went on to star in the comedy hybrid game show series on Game Show Network titled Burt Luddin's Love Buffet as well as produce, write and provide main character voices on the hit Spike TV series Most Extreme Elimination Challenge (MXC).

=== Reruns ===
The Chuck Woolery episodes were rerun on the USA Network from October 16, 1995 to June 6, 1997 and on the Game Show Network from January 6, 2003 to July 18, 2008. Beginning November 9, 2009, the Woolery episodes returned to GSN's weekday lineup but have since been removed. The Pat Bullard and Andy Cohen versions have not been aired since their cancellation. GameTV began airing the first Chuck Woolery season on March 6, 2020.

=== Revivals ===
The series was revived for syndication in the fall of 1998, with Pat Bullard as host. It lasted for one season. It premiered on September 21, 1998 until its end on June 25, 1999. At the time, this version was paired up with Change of Heart original hosted by Chris Jagger (season 1-3 & 5) followed by Lynne Koplitz (season 4).

In 2015, a remake of the show was in development by Warner Bros. for a start in 2016, with comedian Loni Love as host, but those plans fell through.

In January 2017, Fox announced plans to revive the series for Summer 2017, with Andy Cohen serving as host. The reboot premiered at 9:00 p.m. ET on May 25, 2017. On August 10, 2017, Fox renewed the series for a second season, which premiered on May 29, 2018. The second season concluded on September 18, 2018. Cohen announced the series' cancellation on February 27, 2019.

== Ratings ==
=== Season 1 (2017) ===
Viewership and ratings per episode of Love Connection
No.	Title	Air date	Rating/share (18–49)	Viewers (millions)	Ref.
1	"Don't Go Bacon My Heart"	May 25, 2017	1.1/4	3.29	
2	"Rowdy with a Chance of Meatballs"	June 1, 2017	0.9/3	2.87	
3	"Brace Yourself for Love"	June 8, 2017	0.8/3	2.53	
4	"Putting an Earring on It"	June 22, 2017	0.9/4	2.87	
5	"Beauty and the Geek"	June 29, 2017	0.7/3	2.41	
6	"Singer Stinger"	July 13, 2017	0.6/3	2.35	
7	"Grits Me Baby One More Time!"	July 20, 2017	0.7/3	2.59	
8	"Evan 'n Hell"	July 27, 2017	0.6/3	2.02	
9	"White Chocolate & Roses"	August 3, 2017	0.6/3	2.28	
10	"Devilish in a Blue Dress"	August 10, 2017	0.5/2	1.90	
11	"Talk Nerdy to Me"	August 17, 2017	0.6/2	2.32	
12	"Every Rosé Has Its Thor"	August 24, 2017	0.6/3	2.27	
13	"The Friend Zone"	August 31, 2017	0.5/2	1.58	
14	"Bridge to Nowhere"	September 7, 2017	0.6/2	1.97	
15	"Secret Billionaire"	September 14, 2017	0.6/3	2.16	

=== Season 2 (2018) ===
Viewership and ratings per episode of Love Connection
No.	Title	Air date	Rating/share (18–49)	Viewers (millions)	Ref.
1	"Chanelle & Logan"	May 29, 2018	0.6/3	1.80	
2	"Kirstie & Joe"	June 5, 2018	0.5/2	1.53	
3	"Armond & Grace"	June 12, 2018	0.5/2	1.65	
4	"Porsha & Greg"	June 19, 2018	0.5/2	1.77	
5	"Chris & Hannah"	June 26, 2018	0.5/2	1.59	
6	"Episode Six"	July 10, 2018	0.5/2	1.49	
7	"Aaron & Maconnie"	July 24, 2018	0.5/2	1.78	
8	"Episode Eight"	July 31, 2018	0.4/2	1.53	
9	"Vaughn & Josh"	August 7, 2018	0.4/2	1.36	
10	"Johnathan & Amber"	August 14, 2018	0.4/2	1.49	
11	"Annalee & Jon"	September 4, 2018	0.4/2	1.39	
12	"Michael & Diane"	September 11, 2018	0.4/2	1.44	
13	"Be & John"	September 18, 2018	0.5/2	1.75	

== International Version ==
Country	Name	Host	Network	Premiere	Finale
France	Télé Contact	Sophie Garel	La Cinq	September 22, 1990	February 22, 1991
