= El Hombre que Vino del Odio =

- Directed by: León Klimovsky
- Screenplay by: Eduardo Manzanos Brochero
- Starring: Dennis Safren; Luciana Paluzzi; Lang Jeffries
- Release date: 1971
- Country: Spain
- Language: Spanish

El Hombre que Vino del Odio (also known as The Man Who Came from Hate and Run for Your Life) is a 1971 film directed by León Klimovsky. In 1974 a completely re-written and re-edited version was released in the USA under the title Mean Mother.

== Plot ==
A deserter from Vietnam travels to Rome to kidnap an Albanian dancer.
