= Spies (TV series) =

- Genre: Drama
- Created by: Jordan Moffet
- Starring: George Hamilton; Gary Kroeger; Barry Corbin
- Theme music composer: Craig Safan; David Pomeranz
- Opening theme: "Someone's Gotta Do It After All" by Deborah Davis
- Composer: Brad Warnaar
- Country of origin: United States
- Original language: English
- No. of seasons: 1
- No. of episodes: 6

Production
- Executive producer: Jordan Moffet
- Running time: 60 minutes
- Production company: Lorimar-Telepictures

Original release
- Network: CBS
- Release: March 2 – April 14, 1987

Spies is an American comedy-drama series that aired on CBS for one season, from March 3 until April 14, 1987. The original, unaired pilot starred Tony Curtis in the lead role.

== Cast ==
- George Hamilton as Agent Ian Stone
- Gary Kroeger as Agent Ben Smythe
- Barry Corbin as Thomas "C of B" Brady

== Episodes ==
No.	Title	Directed by	Written by	Original release date
1	"The Game's Not Over, 'Til the Fat Lady Sings"	Corey Allen	Jordan Moffet	March 3, 1987
2	"Baby"	Bill Bixby	Maryanne Kasica & Michael Scheff	March 10, 1987
3	"Who Do You Trust?"	Jackie Cooper	Story by : Scott Spencer Gorden; Teleplay by : Bruce Kirschbaum & Scott Spencer Gorden	March 17, 1987
Ian and Ben are assigned to find a security leak in the Company. However, the search hits a snag when each receives orders to terminate the other as the mole.
4	"From China with Love"	Bill Bixby	Maryanne Kasica & Michael Scheff	March 24, 1987
5	"Right or Rong"	Charles S. Dubin	Simon Muntner	April 7, 1987
6	"Radar Love"	Bruce Kessler	Bruce Kirschbaum & Scott Spencer Gorden	April 14, 1987
