= Telepictures =

American production and distribution company

- Logo used since 2009
- Type: Subsidiary
- Industry: Entertainment, television show/filmmaking, broadcast syndication
- Predecessor: Lorimar-Telepictures
- Founded: 1979; 47 years ago (original); 1990; 36 years ago (relaunch)
- Founders: David Salzman; Michael Jay Solomon; Michael Garin
- Defunct: 1986; 40 years ago (original)
- Fate: Merged with Lorimar Productions to form Lorimar-Telepictures (Original)
- Headquarters: 475 Park Avenue, New York City (1980s); 4000 Warner Boulevard, Burbank, California, United States
- Parent: Warner Bros. Television Studios (1990–present)
- Divisions: Telepictures Distribution (1995–2003); AND Syndicated Productions
- Website: telepicturestv.com

Telepictures (also known as Telepictures Productions; formerly known as Telepictures Distribution and Telepictures Corporation) is an American production, distribution, and management company, currently operating as a unit of WBTVS Unscripted Production, which is a division of Warner Bros. Television Studios. Telepictures was established in 1979 by David Salzman, Michael Jay Solomon, and Michael Garin as a television syndication firm.

== History ==
=== Early years ===
The company made its origins when Telepictures decided to distribute four projects, one was a game show in collaboration with Jerome Schnur Productions, and to produce projects for network television and public television stations, mainly PBS, which was maintained by Charles Fries Productions to secure underwriting and had a deal to distribute Time-Life Television fare in the Middle East.

The company syndicated Rankin-Bass's programming and specials that were produced from 1974 to 1988, including new and successful animated series, such as ThunderCats and SilverHawks. Telepictures bought Rankin-Bass outright in 1983. It managed the NIWS news service, and by 1982, had formed a joint venture with Gannett Broadcasting to start out the Newscope program through Gannett/Telepictures.

In addition, Telepictures had syndicated numerous television programs such as My Favorite Martian, Here's Lucy, Love Connection, and the original The People's Court with Judge Joseph Wapner. Telepictures also operated a small publishing arm, which published magazines, such as The Muppets Magazine and Challenge of the GoBots Magazine.

In 1983, Frank Konigsberg's Konigsberg Co. was merged into Telepictures. There, Konigsberg met Larry Sanitsky, who were close friends and partners with Konigsberg, and Telepictures launched its production unit, Telepictures Productions, to handle made-for-TV movies using the assets of the old Konigsberg Company. Also that year, the company launched its Perennial division, to distribute evergreen programming for syndication, such as Mayberry, R.F.D. and The New Dick Van Dyke Show.

On March 21, 1984, it signed a distribution deal with Dick Clark Productions in order to expand its activities in order to distribute virtually all of the Dick Clark productions and TV specials.

=== Lorimar-Telepictures ===
On February 19, 1986, the company merged with Merv Adelson and Lee Rich's Lorimar Television, creating Lorimar-Telepictures and assumed production and distribution of shows like Dallas and Knots Landing. The company also began distribution of first-run episodes of Mama's Family in June 1986 in television. Konigsberg and Sanitsky later exited Telepictures, and used its assets from the old Telepictures Productions to form its own independent production company, The Konigsberg/Sanitsky Company.

The company briefly dabbled into owning television station by purchasing charter Fox affiliate WPGH-TV in Pittsburgh and attempted to purchase then-CBS affiliate WTVJ in Miami. However, after CBS made a half-hearted attempt to purchase Fox affiliate WCIX from Taft Broadcasting (CBS would later make a more serious attempt to purchase the station two years later and succeeded; it is now CBS owned-and-operated station WFOR-TV), Telepictures backed off from purchasing WTVJ. (NBC eventually purchased the station; it remains an NBC O&O today.) The company would then subsequently sell WPGH-TV to Renaissance Broadcasting after only a year in ownership; WPGH-TV, which went through several owners in the 1980s, would not have stable ownership until current owner Sinclair Broadcast Group (which had been outbid by Telepictures for the station in 1986) bought the station from Renaissance in 1990.

=== Purchase by Warner Communications and rebrand as Telepictures Productions (1988–present) ===
In 1987, Lorimar Television was created as a separate production entity of Lorimar-Telepictures. Around this time, the company purchased a 9% stake in Warner Communications (now Warner Bros. Discovery), which set off talks about a possible merger between two entertainment entities. The following year, Warner Communications finally purchased the company. Lorimar Television became a separate subsidiary of Warner Bros. Television Studios until 1993, while Lorimar-Telepictures unit was folded into Warner Bros. Television Distribution. Telepictures became Telepictures Productions in 1990, a producer of syndicated programming that Warner Bros. Television would distribute. Later on that year, David Salzman, founding partner left Lorimar to start Warner-affiliated production company with Millennium Productions, covering affiliated houses like Lorimar Television and Telepictures Productions.

Beginning in 1994, certain Telepictures shows, such as Extra, were co-produced by then-sister company Time Inc., under the name Time-Telepictures Television. Most shows produced by them bore a copyright for "TTT West Coast", while Sports Illustrated videos released during the timeframe bore a copyright for "TTT East Coast" instead. The joint venture ceased in 2003 and TTT productions were brought under the main Telepictures name.

From 2001 to 2006, the company produced programming for primetime via network television after a test run with ElimiDate Deluxe for The WB, and expanded with The Bachelor franchise, but in 2006, the primetime unit was spun off as Warner Horizon Unscripted Television.

In 2004, John Rieber and Alex Duda via Streamroller Entertainment set up an overall deal with the Telepictures company.

=== Telepictures Distribution (1995–2003) ===
In 1995, Time Warner Entertainment formed Telepictures Distribution as a division of Warner Bros. Domestic Television Distribution, running over the oversight of then-EVP Scott Carlin. The company distributed non-Warner Bros. produced programming to which the syndication rights have been licensed to Warner and/or Turner as well as Warner properties.

Upon Time Warner's purchase of Turner in 1996, some of the key assets of Turner Program Services were folded into the company.

In 2003, Telepictures Distribution was folded into Warner Bros. Domestic Television Distribution.

== Shows produced by Telepictures ==
- The People's Court (1981–1993, 1997–2023)
- Love Connection (1983–1994, 1998–1999, 2017–2018)
- Rituals (1984–1985)
- The All New Let's Make a Deal (1984–1986)
- Catchphrase (1985–1986)
- ThunderCats (1985–1989)
- SilverHawks (1986)
- Trump Card (1990–1991)
- Fun House (1990–1991, for Fox)
- The Jesse Jackson Show (1990–1991)
- The Jenny Jones Show (1991–2003)
- The Jane Whitney Show (1992–1994)
- Extra (1994–present)
- Carnie! (1995–1996)
- The Rosie O'Donnell Show (1996–2002, not to be confused with The Rosie Show on OWN)
- In Person with Maureen O'Boyle (1996–1997)
- Change of Heart (1998–2003)
- The Queen Latifah Show (1999–2001)
- Judge Mathis (1999–2023)
- Street Smarts (2000–2005)
- ElimiDate (2001–2006)
- The Caroline Rhea Show (2002–2003)
- Celebrity Justice (2002–2005)
- SlamBall (2002–2003)
- The Bachelor (2002–2006; seasons 1–8 only)
- Are You Hot? (2003)
- The Sharon Osbourne Show (2003–2004)
- The Ellen DeGeneres Show (2003–2022)
- The Bachelorette (2003–2005; seasons 1–3 only)
- The Larry Elder Show (2004–2005)
- The Tyra Banks Show (2005–2010)
- The Dr. Keith Ablow Show (2006–2007)
- TMZ on TV (2007–2021; sold to Fox Corporation and now distributed through Fox First Run with ad sales handled by CBS Media Ventures)
- The Bonnie Hunt Show (2008–2010)
- Judge Jeanine Pirro (2008–2011)
- Lopez Tonight (2009–2011)
- Dr. Drew's Lifechangers (2011–2012)
- Anderson Live (2011–2013)
- Let's Ask America (2012–2015)
- Bethenny (2013–2014)
- The Real (2013–2022)
- Just Keke (2014)
- Candidly Nicole (2014–2015)
- Crime Watch Daily (2015–2018)
- Mad TV (2016 revival series)
- Ellen's Game of Games (2017–2021)
- RuPaul (2019)
- The Jennifer Hudson Show (2022–present)
- True Crime News (2024–2025)

== Formerly-owned stations ==
Stations owned by Telepictures Broadcasting Corp.
Media market	State	Station	Purchased	Sold	Notes
Chico	California	KCPM	1984	1987	(Note: held a 19% stake.)
Midland	Texas	KMID-TV	1984	1988	
Pittsburgh	Pennsylvania	WPGH-TV	1986	1987	
Springfield	Missouri	KSPR	1984	1987	
