= Aaron's Way =

American family drama series television series

- Genre: Family drama
- Created by: Rena Down
- Developed by: William Blinn
- Written by: Jeff Baron; Steven Baum; Christopher Beaumont; William Blinn; Rena Down; Bob Gaydos; Neil Levy
- Directed by: R.W. Goodwin; Noel Nosseck; Robert Scheerer
- Starring: Merlin Olsen; Belinda Montgomery; Samantha Mathis; Erin Chase; Scott Curtis; Kathleen York; Jessica Walter; Christopher Gartin
- Composers: Mark Snow; Joel McNeely
- Country of origin: United States
- Original language: English
- No. of seasons: 1
- No. of episodes: 14

Production
- Executive producers: William Blinn; Jerry Thorpe
- Producers: James H. Brown; R.W. Goodwin; Bonnie Raskin
- Editors: Andrew Cohen; M. Edward Salier
- Running time: 60 minutes (approx)
- Production companies: Bonnie Raskin Productions; Blinn/Thorpe Productions; Lorimar-Telepictures

Original release
- Network: NBC
- Release: March 9 – May 25, 1988

Aaron's Way is an American family drama television series that aired on NBC from March 9 to May 25, 1988. It stars Merlin Olsen as Aaron Miller, the husband and father of an Amish family that moves to California and follows the family's attempts to adapt to Californian culture while retaining their personal values. Also appearing on it were Samantha Mathis and Belinda Montgomery.

== Synopsis ==
Aaron Miller's eldest son Noah has left the Amish community, but Aaron keeps in touch with him using a post office box. When Aaron learns that Noah died in a surfing accident, he goes to California for his funeral, where he learns that Noah had been living with a woman named Susanna Lo Verde, who owns a vineyard and is pregnant by Noah.

Aaron returns to Pennsylvania to consider what to do. Soon a relative of Susanna's arrives by motorcycle and relates her difficulties, and Aaron tells his wife, who had been surprised that Aaron had kept in touch with Noah, that they need to go help her.

To Susanna's surprise, the family arrives and begins helping out while trying to cope with the unfamiliar society and technology. The three Miller children are enrolled in the public school system.

Subsequent episodes of this short-lived series deal with the continuing clash (and sometimes complementary meeting) between the Millers and their worldly hosts and neighbors. Aaron's dedication to the values of integrity and justice bend a few dishonest people their way.

== Cast ==
- Merlin Olsen as Aaron Miller
- Belinda Montgomery as Sarah Miller
- Samantha Mathis as Roseanne Miller
- Erin Chase as Martha Miller
- Scott Curtis as Frank Miller
- Kathleen York as Susannah Lo Verde
- Jessica Walter as Connie Lo Verde
- Christopher Gartin as Mickey Lo Verde
- Pierrino Mascarino as Mr. Benvenuto
- Tiffany Lamb as CeeJay

== Episodes ==
No.	Title	Directed by	Written by	Original release date	Prod. code
1 2	"The Harvest: Parts 1 & 2"	Noel Nosseck	Story by : Rena Down; Teleplay by : William Blinn & Rena Down	March 9, 1988	TBD
3	"New Growth"	Robert Scheerer	William Blinn	March 16, 1988	TBD
4	"A Plain Path"	Unknown	Unknown	March 23, 1988	186207
5	"A Healing Power"	Noel Nosseck	William Blinn	March 30, 1988	186206
6	"Patches of Lights"	Robert Scheerer	William Blinn	April 6, 1988	186214
7	"High Note"	Noel Nosseck	Unknown	April 13, 1988	TBD
8	"The Men Will Cheer and the Boys Will Shout"	Robert Scheerer	Unknown	April 20, 1988	186217
9	"Man and Boy at the Crossing"	Unknown	Unknown	April 27, 1988	186216
10	"Teachers"	Unknown	Unknown	May 4, 1988	186202
11	"Strong Foundations"	Noel Nosseck	Unknown	May 11, 1988	TBD
12	"Invisible People"	Unknown	Unknown	May 15, 1988	186210
13	"Solid Ground"	Noel Nosseck	Unknown	May 18, 1988	186215
14	"New Patterns"	Robert Scheerer	Unknown	May 25, 1988	186209
