= Lorimar-Telepictures =

American entertainment company

Lorimar-Telepictures Corporation
- Type: Public
- Traded as: NYSE: LT
- Industry: Entertainment
- Predecessors: Lorimar Productions; Telepictures Corporation
- Founded: February 17, 1986; 40 years ago
- Defunct: January 12, 1989; 37 years ago
- Fate: Merged with Warner Communications
- Successors: Warner Bros. Domestic Television Distribution; Warner Communications; Telepictures Productions
- Headquarters: 10202 West Washington Boulevard, Culver City, California, United States
- Services: Television and film production; Syndication; Home video; Television broadcasting
- Divisions: Lorimar Television; Lorimar Syndication; Lorimar International; Rankin/Bass Animated Entertainment; Lorimar Sports Network (1986)

Lorimar-Telepictures Corporation, Inc. was an American entertainment company established in 1985 with the merger of Lorimar Productions, Inc. and Telepictures Corporation. Headquartered at the former Metro-Goldwyn-Mayer Studios (now Sony Pictures Studios) in Culver City, California, its assets included television production and syndication (which operated under the Lorimar-Telepictures name), feature films, home video, and broadcasting.

== History ==
The merger of Lorimar-Telepictures was announced on October 7, 1985, by Merv Adelson. On February 19, 1986, the merger was complete. Lee Rich, one of the other founders of Lorimar, sold his shares in 1986 and left the company.

In 1987, Lorimar-Telepictures decided to launch separate divisions with brand logos, which are Lorimar Television for network television production, Lorimar Syndication for broadcast and off-net syndication, and Lorimar International for television distribution, with Lorimar-Telepictures being the parent company of the groups. Both had used Lorimar as operating names starting on January 19, 1987. It is reported that Robert Rosenbaum was named vice president of production at the Lorimar Television unit. Also that year, it faced a $21.7 million loss from the studio.

In June 1988, Warner Communications merged with Lorimar-Telepictures after buying the company.

== List of films/programs produced/distributed by Lorimar-Telepictures ==
Note: All series listed here are now owned and distributed by Warner Bros. Television Studios with a few exceptions.

- The $1,000,000 Chance of a Lifetime
- Aaron's Way (1988)
- ALF (1986–1988) (Note: Currently distributed by Shout! Factory under license from Alien Productions in United States.)
- ALF: The Animated Series (1987–1988)
- Alvin and the Chipmunks (1983–1988; Syndication of first 65 episodes only)
- Animalympics
- Apple's Way
- Bad Men of Tombstone (1949)
- The Bat (1959)
- Behind the Screen
- Berrenger's
- The Best Times
- Big Shamus, Little Shamus
- Blood & Orchids
- The Blue Knight
- Boone
- The Boy Who Could Fly (1986)
- Bridges to Cross
- Cat People (1982)
- Catchphrase
- Chiller (1985)
- The Choirboys (1977)
- Club Med (1986)
- The Comic Strip
- Coming Out of the Ice (1982)
- Dallas (1985–1988)
- Dark Night of the Scarecrow (1981)
- Dark Victory (1976)
- The Days and Nights of Molly Dodd
- A Death in California
- Detective in the House
- Doc Elliot
- The Dollmaker (1984)
- Eight Is Enough: A Family Reunion (1987)
- Eight Is Enough
- Elephant Stampede (1951)
- Falcon Crest (1986–1989)
- Flamingo Road
- Flatbush
- Freddy's Nightmares (1988–1989) (with New Line Television and Stone Television)
- Friendly Persuasion (1956)
- Full House (1987–1988)
- Fun House (with Stone Television)
- Games People Play
- Ghost of a Chance
- Gorillas in the Mist (1988)
- The Greatest American Hero (1981–1983) (distribution only)
- Gumby (1987–1989) (Note: WB's rights to the series reverted to Premavision in 2003.)
- Hard Choices (theatrical film)
- Here's Lucy (Note: Currently distributed by Paul Brownstein Productions/tvclassics.com.)
- The Hogan Family (1986–1989)
- Hothouse'
- House on Haunted Hill (1959)
- Into the Homeland (1987)
- It's a Living (1986–1989)
- Jack Frost
- Jack the Ripper (1988)
- Jake's Journey (1988–1989 pilots for CBS starring Graham Chapman)
- Just Our Luck
- Kaz
- Killer Shark (1950)
- Knots Landing (1986–1989)
- Last Summer (1969)
- The Last Starfighter (1984)
- Legendary Ladies of Rock & Roll
- Light Blast (1985)
- Love Affair (1932)
- Love Connection (1986–1988)
- Made in Heaven
- Maggie Briggs
- Mama's Family
- "Master Harold"...and the Boys (1985)
- The Master of Ballantrae (1984)
- Matewan (1987)
- Max Headroom (not the original pilot by Chrysalis Visual Programming for Channel Four UK)
- Mayberry R.F.D.
- Mazes and Monsters (1982)
- Midnight Caller (1988–1989)
- Mitchell (1975)
- The Morning After (1974)
- The Morning After (1986)
- My Favorite Martian
- Never Say Goodbye (1956)
- The New Dick Van Dyke Show
- One Big Family (1986–1987)
- Operation C.I.A. (1965)
- Our House
- The People's Court (Joseph Wapner era)
- Perfect Match
- Perfect Strangers (1986–1989)
- Real People
- The Redd Foxx Show (1986)
- Reunion at Fairborough (1985)
- Rituals
- Rowan & Martin's Laugh-In (Note: WB's rights to the series later reverted to its original creators.)
- The Sea Wolves (1980)
- Second Serve
- Shattered Innocence (1988)
- She's the Sheriff (1987–1989)
- Sherlock Holmes Faces Death (1943)
- Sherlock Holmes in Washington (1943)
- SilverHawks
- Skag
- Snowfire (1958)
- Sorcerer (1977)
- Spies (1987)
- The Stranger Within (1974)
- Summer Girl
- Superior Court
- Tank (1984)
- ThunderCats (1986–1989)
- Tickle Me (1965)
- Tormented (1960)
- Triumphs of a Man Called Horse (1983)
- Two Marriages
- The Waltons
- Warm Hearts, Cold Feet (1987)
- The Waverly Wonders
- Young Dillinger (1965)

Lorimar-Telepictures also distributed most of the pre-1990 DIC Entertainment and Saban Entertainment series in international markets; most of the DIC series are currently distributed by WildBrain, and most of the Saban series are currently distributed by Disney–ABC Domestic Television, as well as some of the Universal Pictures films that Lorimar distributed are currently distributed by NBCUniversal Syndication Studios via its Universal Television division.

== Broadcasting ==
Lorimar-Telepictures also held ownership interests in several television stations via predecessor Telepictures, mostly based in smaller markets and Puerto Rico. The company made a failed $1 billion offer in 1985 for Multimedia, Inc., which owned eight television stations and fifteen radio stations. On May 21, 1986, Lorimar-Telepictures agreed to purchase from private equity firm KKR WTVJ (channel 4) in Miami, along with Storer Communications stations WAGA-TV in Atlanta, WITI in Milwaukee, WJBK in Detroit, WJW-TV in Cleveland, WSBK-TV in Boston and KCST in San Diego, in a $1.85 billion group deal. WTVJ, including the studio building and surrounding land, was itself sold for $405 million. Also included was Storer's program production company, advertising sales division and Washington news bureau. Lorimar-Telepictures also made purchase offers for WPGH-TV in Pittsburgh and WTTV in Bloomington–Indianapolis.

By October 22, 1986, Lorimar-Telepictures requested to exclude WTVJ from the Storer deal after learning that CBS, of which WTVJ was affiliated with, inquired with the owners of WCIX (channel 6) about a purchase, putting the valuation of WTVJ in peril and ultimately collapsing the entire deal. Other financial market analysts argued that Lorimar grossly overpaid for WTVJ, as the $405 million price was nearly 21 times WTVJ's cash flow (typical station purchase prices were 10 to 14 times cash flow) and made it difficult to cover interest serviced on $2 billion in high-yield bonds. KKR sold WTVJ to NBC in January 1987, ultimately initiating a complicated six-station affiliation swap in Miami and West Palm Beach, Florida, on January 1, 1989. The Storer stations were also sold to George N. Gillett Jr. in 1987.

The purchase offer for WTTV failed to close, with the station instead being sold to Capitol Broadcasting Company. WPGH-TV, which was successfully purchased by Lorimar, was sold to Renaissance Broadcasting in 1987 and, eventually, to current owners Sinclair Broadcast Group in 1990. KCPM, KSPR and KMID were sold to Goltrin Communications in 1988.

Media market	State/Territory	Station	Purchased	Sold	Notes
Chico–Redding	California	KCPM	1985	1988	(Note: Owned by Telepictures prior to its merger with its Lorimar Television.)
Springfield	Missouri	KSPR	1985	1988	
Pittsburgh	Pennsylvania	WPGH-TV	1986	1987	
San Juan–Ponce–Mayagüez	Puerto Rico	WLII	1986	1991	
San Juan–Ponce–Mayagüez	Puerto Rico	WSUR-TV	1986	1991	
Odessa–Midland	Texas	KMID	1985	1988	
