= Thunderball (film) =

1965 James Bond spy film by Terence Young

- Theatrical release poster by Robert McGinnis and Frank McCarthy
- Directed by: Terence Young
- Screenplay by: Richard Maibaum; John Hopkins
- Original screenplay by: Jack Whittingham
- Story by: Kevin McClory; Jack Whittingham; Ian Fleming
- Based on: Thunderball; 1961 novel by Ian Fleming
- Produced by: Kevin McClory
- Starring: Sean Connery; Claudine Auger; Adolfo Celi; Luciana Paluzzi; Rik Van Nutter
- Cinematography: Ted Moore
- Edited by: Peter Hunt; Ernest Hosler
- Music by: John Barry
- Production company: Eon Productions Limited
- Distributed by: United Artists
- Release dates: 9 December 1965 (Tokyo, premiere); 22 December 1965 (United States); 29 December 1965 (United Kingdom)
- Running time: 130 minutes
- Countries: United Kingdom; United States
- Language: English
- Budget: $9 million
- Box office: $141.2 million

Thunderball is a 1965 spy film and the fourth in the James Bond series produced by Eon Productions, starring Sean Connery as the fictional MI6 agent James Bond. It is an adaptation of the 1961 novel of the same name by Ian Fleming, which in turn was based on an original screenplay by Jack Whittingham devised from a story conceived by Kevin McClory, Whittingham, and Fleming. It was the third and final Bond film to be directed by Terence Young, with its screenplay by Richard Maibaum and John Hopkins.

The film follows Bond's mission to find two NATO atomic bombs stolen by SPECTRE, which holds the world ransom to the tune of £100 million in diamonds under threat of destroying an unspecified metropolis in either the United Kingdom or the United States (later revealed to be Miami). The search leads Bond to the Bahamas, where he encounters Emilio Largo, the card-playing, eyepatch-wearing SPECTRE Number Two. Backed by CIA agent Felix Leiter and Largo's mistress, Domino Derval, Bond's search culminates in an underwater battle with Largo's henchmen. The film's complex production comprised four different units, and about a quarter of the film comprises underwater scenes. Thunderball was the first Bond film shot in widescreen Panavision and the first to have a running time of over two hours.

Although planned by Bond film series producers Albert R. Broccoli and Harry Saltzman as the first entry in the franchise, Thunderball was associated with a legal dispute in 1961 when former Fleming collaborators McClory and Whittingham sued him shortly after the 1961 publication of the novel, claiming he based it upon the screenplay the trio had written for a cinematic translation of James Bond. The lawsuit was settled out of court and Broccoli and Saltzman, fearing a rival McClory film, allowed him to retain certain screen rights to the novel's plot and characters, and for McClory to receive sole producer credit on this film; Broccoli and Saltzman instead served as executive producers.

The film was exceptionally successful: its worldwide box-office receipts of $141.2 million (equivalent to $1.44 billion in 2025) exceeded not only that of each of its predecessors but that of every one of the next five Bond films that followed it. After adjusting its earnings to 2011 prices, it has made around $1 billion worldwide, making it the second-highest earning Bond film after Skyfall. In 1966, John Stears won the Academy Award for Best Visual Effects and BAFTA nominated production designer Ken Adam for an award. Some critics and viewers praised the film and branded it a welcome addition to the series, while others found the aquatic action repetitious. The movie was followed by 1967's You Only Live Twice. In 1983, Warner Bros. released a second film adaptation of the Thunderball novel under the title Never Say Never Again, with Connery as Bond for the last time and McClory as executive producer.

== Plot ==
SPECTRE operative Emilio Largo plots to hold NATO ransom by hijacking two atomic bombs from an RAF Avro Vulcan bomber during a training exercise.

At the Shrublands health resort, SPECTRE operative Count Lippe has French Air Force pilot François Derval murdered and replaced by Angelo Palazzi, whose face has been surgically altered to resemble Derval's. Palazzi demands more money, to which SPECTRE agent Fiona Volpe seemingly agrees so he will complete their operation. Palazzi hijacks the bomber jet, killing its crew, and lands it in shallow Bahamian waters. As the bombs are being recovered, Largo kills Palazzi.

British secret agent James Bond, recuperating at Shrublands after a previous assignment, notices and observes Lippe. After they survive mutual assassination attempts, Bond discovers Derval's body. In London, Lippe again targets Bond but Volpe kills him, as his recruitment of Palazzi jeopardised Largo's scheme. All 00 agents are put on high alert after SPECTRE threatens to destroy a major city in the United States or United Kingdom unless they are paid £100 million within seven days. Bond requests that M assign him to Nassau, Bahamas, to make contact with Derval's sister Domino, as he recognises him as the body at the resort.

Bond meets Domino, Largo's mistress, at the beach and later at a casino with Largo. Bond and Largo engage in a cat-and-mouse game whilst feigning ignorance of each other's true identities. Bond meets with CIA agent Felix Leiter, fellow agent Paula Caplan, and MI6 quartermaster Q, and is issued new espionage equipment, including an underwater infrared camera and miniature underwater breathing apparatus. Investigating Largo's ship, the Disco Volante, he discovers an underwater hatch. Largo has Paula kidnapped, and Bond infiltrates his estate at night and finds her dead. He escapes the compound and evades Largo's men during a Junkanoo celebration. Volpe intercepts him, but is killed when a henchman accidentally shoots her while aiming for Bond.

Bond and Leiter find the Vulcan camouflaged underwater, along with the bodies of Palazzi and the crew, though the bombs are missing. When Bond tells Domino that Largo killed her brother, she agrees to help search the Disco Volante for the weapons, using a Geiger counter hidden in his camera. Largo discovers Domino's deception and confines her. Bond disguises himself as one of Largo's divers as SPECTRE prepares to move the bombs. He learns where one is being moved before being discovered and stranded. Leiter finds him using a tracking signal, and they alert the US Coast Guard and US Navy. An underwater battle ensues between US Navy divers and the Disco Volante crew, whose defeat leads to the recovery of one bomb by the Navy.

As Largo escapes with the second bomb, Bond climbs aboard the Disco Volante. Largo detaches the ship's rear shell to become a hydrofoil to escape. Bond sends the Disco Volante out of control and defeats Largo's men. As Largo is about to shoot Bond, Domino kills him with a speargun, avenging her brother's death. Along with hired nuclear physicist Ladislav Kutze, who freed Domino, the three jump from the Disco Volante seconds before it crashes into rocks and explodes. Kutze cannot swim but is given a lifebuoy, and his fate is unknown. Bond and Domino are retrieved by a plane using a sky hook.

== Cast ==
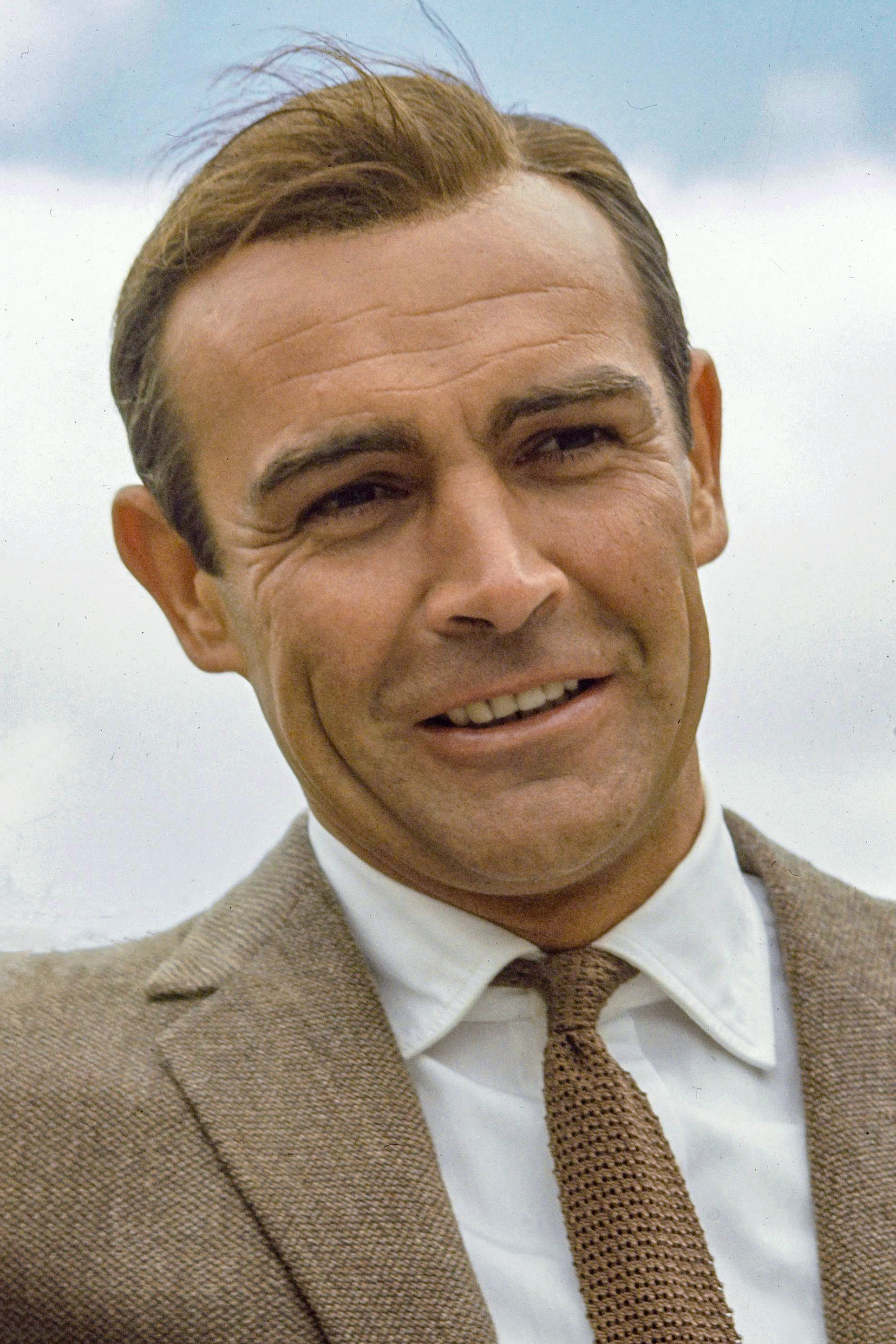
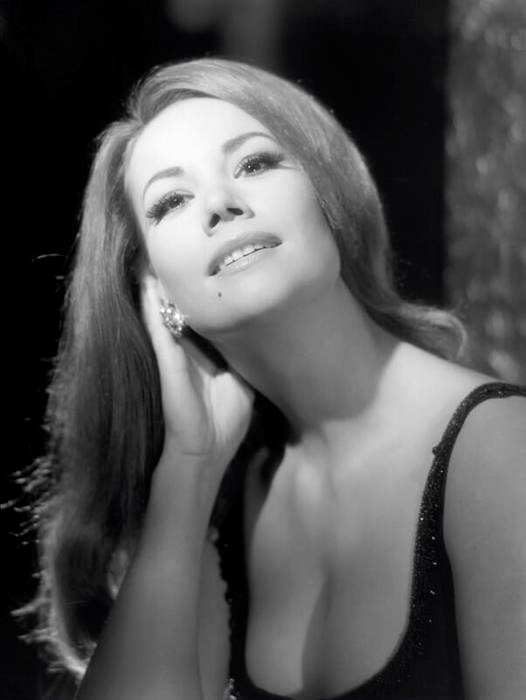
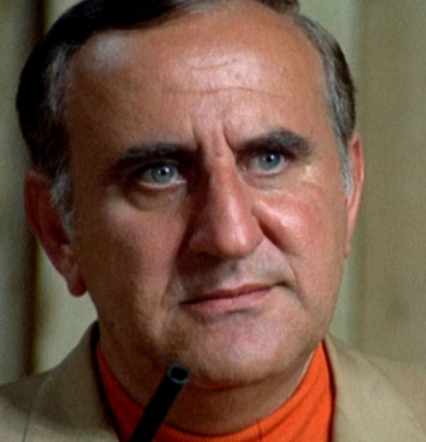
Sean Connery (left) in 1964, Claudine Auger (in 1966) and Adolfo Celi (in 1972)
- Sean Connery as James Bond: An MI6 agent assigned to retrieve two stolen nuclear weapons
- Claudine Auger as Domino (voice dubbed by Nikki van der Zyl): Dominique "Domino" Derval is Largo's mistress. In early drafts of the screenplay, Domino's name was Dominetta Palazzi. When Claudine Auger was cast as Domino, the name was changed to Derval to reflect her nationality. The character's wardrobe reflects her name, as she is usually dressed in black and/or white.
- Adolfo Celi as Emilio Largo (voice dubbed by Robert Rietty): SPECTRE's Number Two, he devises a scheme to steal two atomic bombs
- Luciana Paluzzi as Fiona Volpe: SPECTRE assassin who becomes Francois Derval's mistress to kill and replace him with his double, and later helps with Largo's plot in Nassau
- Rik Van Nutter as Felix Leiter: CIA agent who helps Bond
- Guy Doleman as Count Lippe: the SPECTRE agent (ranked Number Four) in charge of the operation of replacing Derval with Angelo
- Molly Peters (voice dubbed by Barbara Jefford) as Patricia Fearing: A physiotherapist at the health clinic
- Martine Beswick as Paula Caplan: Bond's CIA ally in Nassau. Beswick's made two appearances as a 'Bond Girl', the first being in From Russia With Love.
- Bernard Lee as "M": Head of MI6
- Desmond Llewelyn as "Q": MI6's quartermaster, he supplies Bond with multi-purpose vehicles and gadgets useful for the latter's missions.
- Lois Maxwell as Moneypenny: M's secretary
- Roland Culver as the Home Secretary: British Minister who briefs the "00" agents for Operation Thunderball and has doubts about Bond's efficiency
- Earl Cameron as Pinder: Bahaman intelligence operative who serves as Bond and Leiter's contact in Nassau
- Paul Stassino as François Derval / Angelo Palazzi (credited for Palazzi): François Derval is a French Air Force pilot assigned to the NATO staff and also Domino's brother. He is killed by Angelo, who impersonates him.
- Rose Alba as Madame Boitier: purportedly the widow of Colonel Jacques Bouvar, while in reality 'she' is Bouvar in disguise
- Philip Locke as Vargas: Largo's personal assistant and primary henchman
- George Pravda as Ladislav Kutze: A nuclear physicist, he aids Largo with the captured bombs, but when Largo disregards the authorities firing on them, he pities and rescues Domino.
- Michael Brennan as Janni: one of Largo's henchmen, usually paired with Vargas
- Leonard Sachs as Group Captain Prichard: Bond's RAF liaison during Operation Thunderball
- Edward Underdown as Air Vice Marshal: a senior RAF officer who briefs the 00 agents on the range of the missing Vulcan and its disappearance
- Reginald Beckwith as Kenniston: the Home Secretary's assistant

Uncredited:

- Maryse Guy Mitsouko as Madame LaPorte: a French secret service agent
- Bob Simmons as Colonel Jacques Bouvar: SPECTRE Number Six, who is killed by Bond in the pre-title scene
- Anthony Dawson as Ernst Stavro Blofeld (voiced by Eric Pohlmann): The head of SPECTRE, Number One (neither actor is credited)
- Bill Cummings as Quist: one of Largo's henchmen
- Murray Kash as SPECTRE Number Eleven: an American senior member of SPECTRE who reports on a drug dealing mission jointly led by him and Number Nine
- André Maranne as SPECTRE Number Ten: a French senior member of SPECTRE who reports on assassinating a French defector to the USSR
- Clive Cazes as SPECTRE Number Nine: a French senior member of SPECTRE who gets killed by Blofeld for embezzling money.
- Michael Smith as SPECTRE Number Eight: a senior member of SPECTRE
- Cecil Cheng as SPECTRE Number Seven: a Japanese senior member of SPECTRE who reports on a blackmail mission
- Philip Stone as SPECTRE Number Five: an English senior member of SPECTRE who reports on helping to plan the Great Train Robbery
- Victor Beaumont as SPECTRE Number Three: a senior member of SPECTRE
- Gábor Baraker as SPECTRE Number Thirteen: a senior member of SPECTRE

== Production ==
=== Legal disputes ===
Originally meant as the first James Bond film, Thunderball was the centre of legal disputes that began in 1961 and ran until 2006. Former Ian Fleming collaborators Kevin McClory and Jack Whittingham sued Fleming shortly after the 1961 publication of the Thunderball novel, claiming he based it upon the screenplay the trio had earlier written in a failed cinematic translation of James Bond. The lawsuit was settled out of court, with McClory retaining certain screen rights to the novel's story, plot, and characters. By then, Bond was a box-office success, and series producers Broccoli and Saltzman feared a rival McClory film beyond their control; they agreed to McClory's producer's credit of a cinematic Thunderball, with them as executive producers.

Later, in 1964, Eon producers Broccoli and Saltzman agreed with McClory to cinematically adapt the novel; it was promoted as "Ian Fleming's Thunderball". Yet, along with the official credits to screenwriters Richard Maibaum and John Hopkins, the screenplay is also identified as 'based on an original screenplay by Jack Whittingham' and as 'based on the original story by Kevin McClory, Jack Whittingham, and Ian Fleming'. To date, the novel has twice been adapted cinematically, as the 1983 Jack Schwartzman-produced Never Say Never Again features Sean Connery as James Bond, but is not an Eon production.

=== Casting ===
Broccoli's original choice for the role of Domino Derval was Julie Christie following her performance in Billy Liar in 1963. Upon meeting her personally, he was disappointed and turned his attentions towards Raquel Welch after seeing her on the cover of the October 1964 issue of Life. Welch was hired by Richard Zanuck of 20th Century Fox to appear in the film Fantastic Voyage the same year, instead. Faye Dunaway was also considered for the role and came close to signing for the part. Saltzman and Broccoli auditioned an extensive list of relatively unknown European actresses and models, including former Miss Italy Maria Grazia Buccella, Yvonne Monlaur of the Hammer horror films, and Gloria Paul. Eventually, former Miss France Claudine Auger was cast, and the script was rewritten to make her character French rather than Italian, although her lines were dubbed in the final cut by Nikki van der Zyl, who had voiced several previous Bond girls. Nevertheless, director Young cast her once again in his next film, Triple Cross (1966). One of the actresses who tried for Domino, Luciana Paluzzi, later accepted the role as the redheaded femme fatale assassin Fiona Kelly, who originally was intended by Maibaum to be Irish. The surname was changed to Volpe in co-ordination with Paluzzi's nationality.

=== Filming ===
James Bond's Europe in Thunderball

James Bond's Bahamas in Thunderball

Guy Hamilton was invited to direct, but considered himself worn out and "creatively drained" after the production of Goldfinger. Terence Young, director of the first two Bond films, returned to the series. Coincidentally, when Saltzman invited him to direct Dr. No, Young expressed interest in directing adaptations of Dr. No, From Russia with Love and Thunderball. Years later, Young said Thunderball was filmed "at the right time", considering that if it was the first film in the series, the low budget (Dr. No cost only $1 million) would not have yielded good results. Thunderball was the final James Bond film directed by Young.

The film's complex production comprised four different units, and about a quarter of the film comprises underwater scenes. Filming commenced on 16 February 1965, with principal photography of the opening scene in Paris. Filming then moved to the Château d'Anet, near Dreux, France, for the fight in the precredit sequence. Much of the film was shot in the Bahamas, as Thunderball is widely known for its extensive underwater action scenes which are played out through much of the latter half of the film. The rest of the film was shot at Pinewood Studios, Buckinghamshire, Silverstone racing circuit for the chase involving Count Lippe, Fiona Volpe's RPG-armed BSA Lightning motorcycle and James Bond's Aston Martin DB5 before moving to Nassau, and Paradise Island in the Bahamas (where most of the footage was shot), and Miami. Huntington Hartford gave permission to shoot footage on his Paradise Island and is thanked at the end of the film.

On arriving in Nassau, McClory searched for locations to shoot many of the key sequences of the film and used the home of a local millionaire couple, the Sullivans, for Largo's estate, Palmyra. Part of the SPECTRE underwater assault was also shot on the coastal grounds of another millionaire's home on the island. Most of the underwater scenes had to be done at lower tides due to the sharks on the Bahamian coast.

After he read the script, Connery realised the risk of the sequence with the sharks in Largo's pool and insisted that production designer Ken Adam build a Plexiglas partition inside the pool. The barrier was not a fixed structure, so when one of the sharks managed to pass through it, Connery fled the pool, seconds away from attack. Ken Adam later told UK daily newspaper The Guardian,

We had to use special effects, but unlike special effects today, they were real. The jet pack we used in Thunderball was real – it was invented for the United States Army. Bloody dangerous, and it only lasted a couple of minutes. The ejector seat in the Aston Martin was real and Emilio Largo's boat, the Disco Volante, was real. You had power boats at that time, but there were no good-sized yachts that were able to travel at 40 to 50 knots, so it was quite a problem. But by combining a hydrofoil, which we bought in Puerto Rico for $10,000, and a catamaran, it at least looked like a big yacht. We combined the two hulls with a one-inch slip bolt and when they split it worked like a dream. We used lots of sharks for this movie. I'd rented a villa in the Bahamas with a saltwater pool which we filled with sharks and used for underwater filming. The smell was horrendous. This was where Sean Connery came close to being bitten. We had a plexiglass corridor to protect him, but I didn't have quite enough plexiglass and one of the sharks got through. He never got out of a pool faster in his life – he was walking on water.

When special-effects coordinator John Stears provided a supposedly dead shark to be towed around the pool, the shark, which was still alive, revived at one point. Due to the dangers on the set, stuntman Bill Cummings demanded an extra fee of £250 to double for Largo's sidekick Quist as he was dropped into the pool of sharks.

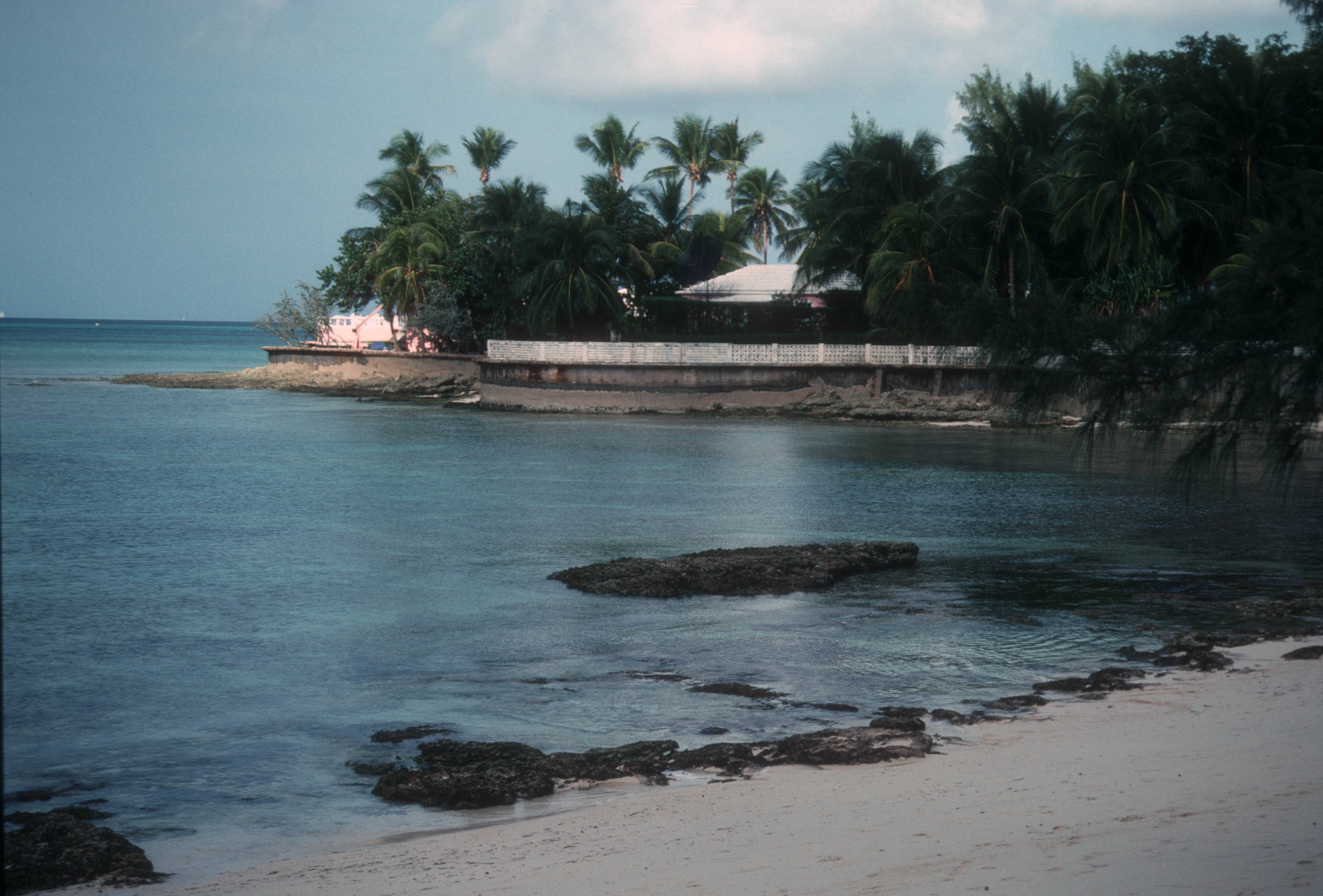
The home used as Largo's estate in the film

The climactic underwater battle was shot at Clifton Pier and was choreographed by Hollywood expert Ricou Browning, who had worked on Creature from the Black Lagoon in 1954 and other films. He was responsible for the staging of the cave sequence and the battle scenes beneath Disco Volante and called in his specialist team of divers who posed as those engaged in the onslaught. Voit provided much of the underwater gear, including the Aqua-Lungs, in exchange for product placement and film tie-in merchandise. The ability to breathe underwater for extended periods of time was a new product that had previously been used by underwater explorer Jacques Cousteau and using it in a movie was a new approach. Lamar Boren, an underwater photographer, was hired to shoot all of the sequences. Filming in the Bahamas ceased in late May 1965, and the final scene shot was the physical fight on the bridge of Disco Volante. Filming of the movie ended on 9 July 1965, at Pinewood Studios.

While in Nassau, during the final shooting days, special-effects supervisor John Stears was supplied experimental rocket fuel to use in exploding Largo's yacht. Ignoring the true power of the volatile liquid, Stears doused the entire yacht with it, took cover, and then detonated the boat. Stears said the resultant massive explosion shattered windows along Bay Street in Nassau roughly 30 miles away. Stears went on to win an Academy Award for his work on Thunderball.

As the filming neared its conclusion, Connery had become increasingly agitated with press intrusion and was distracted with difficulties in his marriage of 32 months to actress Diane Cilento. Connery refused to speak to journalists and photographers who followed him in Nassau, stating his frustration with the harassment that came with the role: "I find that fame tends to turn one from an actor and a human being into a piece of merchandise, a public institution. Well, I don't intend to undergo that metamorphosis." In the end, he gave only a single interview, to Playboy, as filming was wrapped up, and even turned down a substantial fee to appear in a promotional TV special made by Wolper Productions for NBC, The Incredible World of James Bond. According to editor Peter R. Hunt, Thunderball's release was delayed for three months, from September until December 1965, after he met David Picker of United Artists, and convinced him it would be impossible to edit the film to a high enough standard without the extra time.

=== Effects ===
Thanks to special-effects man John Stears, Thunderball's pretitle teaser, the Aston Martin DB5 (introduced in Goldfinger), reappears armed with rear-firing water cannon, seeming noticeably weathered—just dust and dirt, raised moments earlier by Bond's landing with the Bell Rocket Belt (developed by Bell Aircraft Corporation). The rocket belt Bond uses to escape the château actually worked, and was used many times, before and after, for entertainment, most notably at Super Bowl I and at scheduled performances at the 1964–1965 New York World's Fair.

Bond receives a spear gun-armed underwater jet pack scuba (allowing the frogman to manoeuvre faster than other frogmen). Designed by Jordan Klein, green dye was meant to be used by Bond as a smoke screen to escape pursuers. Instead Ricou Browning, the film's underwater director, used it to make Bond's arrival more dramatic.

The sky hook used to rescue Bond at the end of the film was a rescue system used by the United States military at the time. At Thunderball's release, there was confusion as to whether a rebreather such as the one that appears in the film existed; most Bond gadgets, while implausible, often are based upon real technology. In the real world, a rebreather could not be so small, as it has no room for the breathing bag, while the alternative open-circuit scuba releases exhalation bubbles, which the film device does not. It was made with two CO_{2} bottles glued together and painted, with a small mouthpiece attached. For this reason, when the Royal Corps of Engineers asked Peter Lamont how long a man could use the device underwater, the answer was "As long as you can hold your breath."

On 26 June 2013, Christie's auction house sold the Breitling SA Top Time watch worn in the film by Connery for over £100,000; given to Bond by Q, it was also a Geiger counter in the plot.

=== Music ===
Thunderball was the third James Bond score composed by John Barry, after From Russia with Love and Goldfinger. The original title song was entitled "Mr Kiss Kiss, Bang Bang", taken from an Italian journalist who in 1962 dubbed agent 007 as Mr Kiss Kiss, Bang Bang. The title theme was written by Barry and Leslie Bricusse; the song was originally recorded by Shirley Bassey, but it was realised late in the day that the track was too short for the needed titles. As Bassey was unavailable, it was later rerecorded by Dionne Warwick with a longer instrumental introduction. Her version was not released until the 1990s. The song was removed from the title credits after producers Albert R. Broccoli and Harry Saltzman were worried that a theme song to a James Bond film would not work well if the song did not have the title of the film in its lyrics. Barry then teamed up with lyricist Don Black and wrote "Thunderball", which was sung by Tom Jones, who according to Bond production legend, fainted in the recording booth when singing the song's final note. Jones said of it, "I closed my eyes and I held the note for so long when I opened my eyes the room was spinning."

Country musician Johnny Cash also submitted a song to Eon productions titled "Thunderball", but it went unused.

== Release and reception ==
The film premiered on 9 December 1965 at the Hibiya Theatre in Tokyo and opened on 29 December 1965 in the UK. It was a major success at the box office with record-breaking earnings. In its opening in Tokyo in one theatre, it grossed a Japanese record opening day of $13,091, and the following day it set a record one-day gross of $16,121. It grossed $63.6 million in the United States, equating to roughly 58.1 million admissions, and became the third-highest grossing film of 1965, behind The Sound of Music and Doctor Zhivago. In total, the film has earned $141.2 million worldwide, surpassing the earnings of the three preceding films in the series—easily recouping its $9 million budget—and remained the highest-grossing Bond film until Live and Let Die (1973) assumed the record. After adjusting its earnings to 2011 prices, it has made around $1 billion worldwide, making it the second-highest earning Bond film after Skyfall.

Thunderball won an Academy Award for Best Visual Effects awarded to John Stears in 1966. Ken Adam, the production director, was also nominated for a Best Production Design BAFTA award. The film won the Golden Screen Award in Germany and the Golden Laurel Action Drama award at the 1966 Laurel Awards. The film was also nominated for an Edgar Best Foreign Film award at the Edgar Allan Poe Awards.

=== Contemporary reviews ===
The film received generally positive reviews. Dilys Powell of The Sunday Times remarked that "The cinema was a duller place before 007." David Robinson of the Financial Times criticised the appearance of Connery and his effectiveness to play Bond in the film, remarking: "It's not just that Sean Connery looks a lot more haggard and less heroic than he did two or three years ago, but there is much less effort to establish him as connoisseur playboy. Apart from the off-handed order for Beluga, there is little of that comic display of bon viveur-manship that was one of the charms of Connery's almost-a-gentleman 007."

Bosley Crowther of The New York Times found the film to be more humorous than its previous instalments and felt "Thunderball is pretty, too, and it is filled with such underwater action as would delight Capt. Jacques-Yves Cousteau." He further praised the principal actors and wrote "[t]he color is handsome. The scenery in the Bahamas is an irresistible lure. Even the violence is funny. That's the best I can say for a Bond film." Variety felt Thunderball was a "tight, exciting melodrama in which novelty of action figures importantly". Philip K. Scheuer, reviewing for the Los Angeles Times, was less impressed, writing: "It is the same as its predecessors, only more–too much of everything, from sudden desire to sudden desire." Additionally, he wrote: "The submarine sequences are as pretty as can be in Technicolor, featuring besides fish and flippered bipeds, all sorts of awesome diving bells and powered sea sleds – not to mention an arsenal of lethal spear guns. If I could have just known more than half the time what, precisely, they were doing, the effect could have been prettier yet."

Time magazine applauded the film's underwater photography, but felt the "script hasn't a morsel of genuine wit, but Bond fans, who are preconditioned to roll in the aisles when their hero merely asks a waiter to bring some beluga caviar and Dom Pérignon '55, will probably never notice. They are switched on by a legend that plays straight to the senses, and its colors are primary." Clifford Terry of the Chicago Tribune felt the dialogue was "so bad, it's great" and highlighted Auger as "probably the most genteel of all the Bond babies to date". Overall, he felt the film belonged to Connery, writing he "throws out those incredible lines without so much as batting a steely-cold eye".

=== Retrospective reviews ===
According to Danny Peary, Thunderball "takes forever to get started and has too many long underwater sequences during which it's impossible to tell what's going on. Nevertheless, it's an enjoyable entry in the Bond series. Sean Connery is particularly appealing as Bond – I think he projects more confidence than in other films in the series. Film has no great scene, but it's entertaining as long as the actors stay above water."

James Berardinelli praised Connery's performance, the femme fatale character of Fiona Volpe, and the underwater action sequences, remarking that they were well choreographed and clearly shot. He criticised the length of the scenes, stating they were in need of editing, particularly during the film's climax.

On Rotten Tomatoes, the film has an 85% rating based on 54 reviews with an average rating of 6.70/10. The website's consensus reads: "Lavishly rendered set pieces and Sean Connery's enduring charm make Thunderball a big, fun adventure, even if it doesn't quite measure up to the series' previous heights." On Metacritic the film has a score of 64 out of 100 based on reviews from nine critics. In 2014, Time Out polled several film critics, directors, actors, and stunt actors to list their top action films; Thunderball was listed at number 73.

== See also ==
- Outline of James Bond
- Casino Royale history for further information on the James Bond legal disputes between Sony and MGM.
