= Fiona Volpe =

- James Bond character
- Luciana Paluzzi as Fiona Volpe
- First appearance: Thunderball (1965)
- Portrayed by: Luciana Paluzzi

In-universe information
- Gender: Female
- Affiliation: SPECTRE
- Classification: Bond girl / Henchwoman

Fiona Volpe is a character in the James Bond film Thunderball, played by Luciana Paluzzi. Paluzzi originally auditioned for the role of Domino Vitali in the film, but was given the role of Volpe. The character does not appear in the novel, and was originally an Irish woman, but was changed to match Paluzzi's Italian ethnicity: "Volpe" is Italian for "fox".

== In the film ==
In the film Thunderball, Fiona Volpe is a SPECTRE agent who seduces NATO pilot Major François Derval (Paul Stassino) in order to steal his plane with its cargo of two atomic bombs. She then kills her fellow operative Count Lippe (Guy Doleman), who had jeopardized the operation, with a missile fired from her BSA Lightning motorcycle.

Volpe meets James Bond (Sean Connery) in the Bahamas, where she gives him a very fast ride in a Ford Mustang convertible to the hotel at which they are both staying. They have sex, but Volpe then takes Bond captive at gunpoint and insults him. Bond escapes, but Volpe and her men follow him to a nightclub. Bond and Volpe dance, but one of her men attempts to shoot Bond — he spins Volpe into the path of the bullet, and she is killed instantly.

== Analysis ==
Laureen Gibson notes that Volpe wears a gown when she threatens Bond. The clash between the seemingly feminine clothing and the violent action makes her seem especially sinister. Gibson also contrasts Volpe with Domino Derval (Claudine Auger):

In Thunderball both Bond girl Domino Derval and villain Fiona Volpe are costumed in low-cut evening gowns. However, the clearly synthetic, metallic blue fabric worn by the female villain contrasts the white chiffon of the Bond girl's dress. Fiona Volpe also wears a large, bright blue feather boa — adding to her overly made-up appearance. Her costume reads as unnatural, reinforcing her feminine pageantry."

Kirsten Smith suggests that Volpe is the "classic fictional femme fatale combining all the elements which make her dangerous but incredibly sexy to the hero, in this case James Bond." Smith goes on to argue that Volpe's downfall comes when she insults Bond: " ... the threat that she now poses to Bond's masculinity means that she must now be killed in order to reassert the traditional gender roles."

In the six drafts of an aborted James Bond film written in the 1950s, the character was named Fatima Blush. When Fleming wrote the novel Thunderball based on those scripts, he dropped the character and the name. This name was resurrected in the 1983 adaptation of those scripts and the Fleming novel Never Say Never Again as the new analogue for Volpe, played by Barbara Carrera. Volpe also served as the template for Helga Brandt (Karin Dor) in You Only Live Twice.
