= Domino Vitali =

Domino
- James Bond character
- Claudine Auger as Domino (1965)
- First appearance: Thunderball
- Last appearance: Never Say Never Again
- Created by: Ian Fleming
- Portrayed by: Claudine Auger (1965); Kim Basinger (1983)

In-universe information
- Gender: Female
- Affiliation: Mistress of Largo
- Classification: Bond girl

Dominetta Vitali, known simply as Domino, is a fictional character and the main Bond girl in the James Bond novel Thunderball. For the 1965 film adaptation of the same name, her name was changed to Dominique Derval, nicknamed Domino, and she was portrayed by French actress Claudine Auger. In the 1983 film adaptation Never Say Never Again, her character was renamed Domino Petachi and she was portrayed by American actress Kim Basinger.

== Biography ==
=== The novel ===
Born Dominetta Petacchi, Domino is an Italian beauty from Bolzano who went to school in England at Cheltenham Ladies' College. She later studied acting at the Royal Academy of Dramatic Art until being forced (after her parents' death in a train wreck) to return to Italy, where she became an actress. She changed her surname to Vitali, a stage name. While in Italy she also became the mistress of Emilio Largo, whom she calls a "guardian" of no relation.

James Bond meets Domino while in Nassau. She is staying on Largo's yacht, the Disco Volante, and believes Largo is in the area on a treasure hunt. For reasons she does not understand Largo makes her stay on land while he and his partners (whom she describes as shareholders) go prospecting for the hidden treasure. She also tells Bond that she has never been able to see the map that they use. Although Bond is successful in engaging Domino in conversation, she snubs him, but later agrees to meet with him again when she returns to land.

When Bond and Domino meet again at the casino later, she has entirely changed. She tells Bond that she is tired of watching Largo show off and letting him use her. She explains to Bond that she is trapped like a bird in a gilded cage. Domino later reveals that Giuseppe Petacchi is her brother whom she has not seen for some time. Bond finds out that Largo had Petacchi killed after Petacchi had hijacked a bomber on SPECTRE's behalf. He proves this to Domino, and recruits her as an ally to spy on Largo. Domino returns to Largo's yacht, the Disco Volante, with a geiger counter to verify the ship as the location of the two stolen nuclear bombs. However, she is uncovered and taken prisoner. Largo tortures her by burning her with a cigar for heat and then using ice cubes for cold.

Domino ultimately escapes as Largo attempts to carry out his plan. Before he can kill a weakened James Bond, she appears behind Largo and shoots him through the neck with a harpoon from a spear gun, avenging her brother.

=== The films ===
==== Thunderball ====
In early drafts of the Thunderball screenplay, the character's name was Dominetta Palazzi. When Claudine Auger was cast as Domino, the character's surname was changed to Derval to reflect her nationality.

Dominique Derval is seen when Bond (Sean Connery) is swimming in Nassau, her foot gets stuck in coral on the ocean floor but Bond sets her free. She swims up to her boat and thanks Bond. Bond swims back to his boat with his Nassau contact, Paula Caplan (Martine Beswick). Paula takes care of their boat, as Bond is about to learn more about Domino. Domino and Bond have lunch on the beach, but Emilio Largo (Adolfo Celi)'s henchman Quist (Bill Cummings) spies on the two, a sign that Domino had to go back to the yacht Disco Volante. At the hotel Bond stays in, Bond sees Domino with Largo, Domino smoking a cigar, as Bond bids in the game against Largo. Domino tells Largo that Bond has pressed her to a drink. Domino and Bond slow-dance outside but Largo collects her.

Upon arriving at Largo's home in Palmyra, Domino is swimming when Bond visits. Largo invites Bond to the Nassau Junkanoo and Domino accompanies them. The next day, Domino and Bond make love in the water. They go on shore and Bond tells Domino the story: Largo killed her brother François Derval (Paul Stassino), a French Air Force pilot assigned to NATO, in order for SPECTRE to steal a Royal Air Force Avro Vulcan strategic bomber with two nuclear bombs and hold NATO ransom.

Domino then aids Bond by spying on the Disco Volante, but Largo captures and tortures her. Domino escapes and kills Largo with a harpoon in the back. She and Bond then jump off Volante just in time before it explodes. They are immediately rescued by the CIA B-17 and carried into the air on a sky hook.

==== Never Say Never Again ====
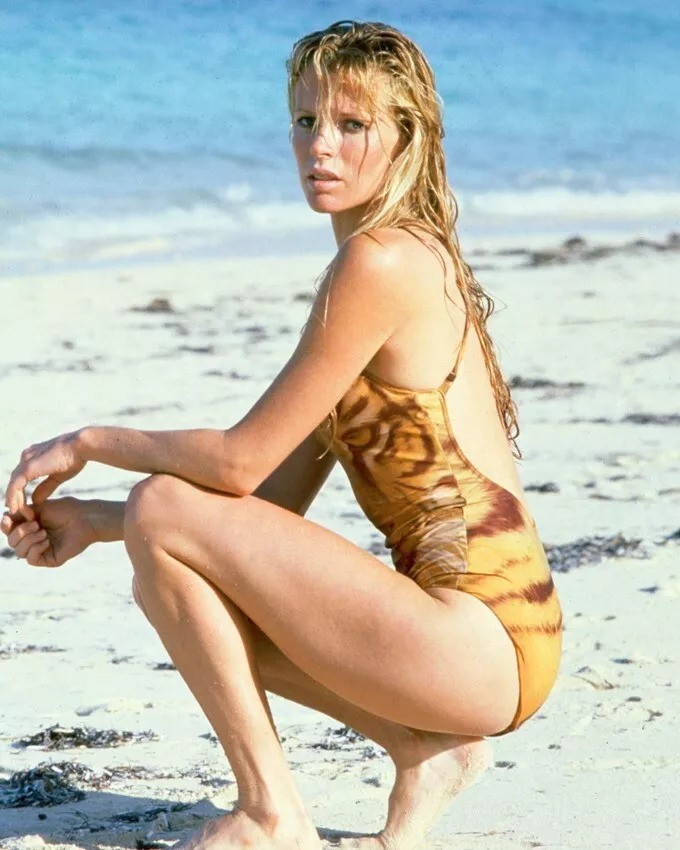
Kim Basinger as Domino (1983)

In Never Say Never Again, the character is called Domino Petachi (played by Kim Basinger), with her last name resembling the novel's original Petacchi. Unlike in the first film version where she refers to Largo as her "guardian", there is no disguising the fact they are involved romantically.

Domino meets Bond at a spa in Monte Carlo, where he poses as a masseur and massages her for information. This gives her immense pleasure, though she later realizes he is not who he appears to be. She encounters him again at a casino where Bond introduces himself to her. They have drinks before being interrupted by Largo (Klaus Maria Brandauer). The two dance briefly, where Bond informs her about the death of her brother Jack Petachi (Gavan O'Herlihy). Bond is then invited to Largo's yacht, where Largo spies on them kissing in her cabin. He leaves Bond manacled near Palmyra, while Domino is auctioned off as a slave to some unsavory Arabs. Bond eventually escapes and rescues her. They are then chased by the Arabs on horseback until the horse jumps off a cliff into the ocean. They are rescued from the water by Felix Leiter (Bernie Casey) and a team from MI6. After their rescue, Domino and Bond track Largo to a location known as "The Tears of Allah". The two take a shower together, and Bond kisses her before heading off to stop Largo. The circumstances of her spearing Largo as he and Bond fight are altered from the original film – here it takes place underwater, with all the characters in scuba gear. The film ends with Bond indicating his intention to retire from MI6 and settle down with Domino.

== Reception ==
About.com ranked Claudine Auger's Domino as number eight in their list of best Bond girls, calling her a "knockout". Robert Caplen argues that Auger's Domino is part of a "successful formula" in the first decade of the franchise of "portraying submissive and obedient women" who "willingly allow Bond's masculinity to subdue them".

In a 2008 poll conducted by Moviefone, Kim Basinger ranked number three in the top 10 sexiest Bond girls for her portrayal of Domino. In 2023, Men's Journal named Basinger eighth on their list of the best Bond girls of all time.

While Auger vanished into obscurity after the release of Thunderball, Basinger went on to a decade-long reign as filmdom's foremost sex symbol after Never Say Never Again, starring in such high-profile movies as 9½ Weeks, Batman, L.A. Confidential and 8 Mile.
