= Top-rated United States television programs of 1973–74 =

This table displays the top-rated primetime television series of the 1973–74 season as measured by Nielsen Media Research.

Rank	Program	Network	Rating
1	All in the Family	CBS	31.2
2	The Waltons	CBS	28.1
3	Sanford and Son	NBC	27.5
4	M*A*S*H	CBS	25.7
5	Hawaii Five-O	CBS	24.0
6	Maude	CBS	23.5
7	Kojak	CBS	23.3
7	The Sonny & Cher Comedy Hour	CBS	23.3
9	The Mary Tyler Moore Show	CBS	23.1
9	Cannon	CBS	23.1
11	The Six Million Dollar Man	ABC	22.7
12	The Bob Newhart Show	CBS	22.3
12	The Wonderful World of Disney	NBC	22.3
14	The NBC Sunday Mystery Movie	NBC	22.2
15	Gunsmoke	CBS	22.1
16	Happy Days	ABC	21.5
17	Good Times	CBS	21.4
17	Barnaby Jones	CBS	21.4
19	Monday Night Football	ABC	21.2
19	CBS Friday Night Movie	CBS	21.2
21	Tuesday Movie of the Week	ABC	21.0
22	The Streets of San Francisco	ABC	20.8
23	Adam-12	NBC	20.7
23	ABC Sunday Night Movie	ABC	20.7
25	The Rookies	ABC	20.3
26	ABC Monday Movie	ABC	20.2
27	The Carol Burnett Show	CBS	20.1
27	Kung Fu	ABC	20.1
29	Here's Lucy	CBS	20.0
30	CBS Thursday Movie	CBS	19.9
