= Monty Nash =

American television series

- Based on: Spy series by Richard Telfair
- Developed by: Richard Jessup
- Starring: Harry Guardino
- Theme music composer: Michael Lloyd
- Opening theme: "Theme From Monty Nash"
- Country of origin: United States
- Original language: English
- No. of episodes: 14

Production
- Executive producer: Everett Chambers
- Running time: 30 minutes
- Production companies: Almada Productions, Inc. Four Star International

Original release
- Network: Syndication
- Release: September 14 – December 14, 1971

Monty Nash is an American drama series that aired in syndication from September 14 until December 14, 1971. It was based on a series of spy novels by Richard Telfair that were published from 1959 to 1961.

== Synopsis ==
The series centered on Monty Nash, a government investigator who went undercover to catch criminals, including counterfeiters and smugglers.

== Cast ==
- Harry Guardino as Monty Nash

== Episodes ==
No.	Title	Directed by	Written by	Original release date	Prod. code
1	"The Long Ride"	Nicholas Colasanto	Shirl Hendryx	September 17, 1971	A007
The life of the main witness (Don Gordon) preparing to testify in the investigation against a crime syndicate is now in danger.
2	"The Hunting License"	Nicholas Colasanto	Lee Erwin	September 24, 1971	A017
A former spy (Leslie Nielsen) who has fallen into mental illness draws Nash into a deadly game of cat and mouse.
3	"Death Squad"	John Peyser	Leigh Vance	October 1, 1971	A016
Nash has to bridge the generation gap to protect the leader of a hippie group who is in danger.
4	"The Man in the Embassy"	John Peyser	Fred Freiberger	October 8, 1971	A006
Nash is given a mission of freeing an American held behind enemy lines and must formulate an elaborate escape.
5	"Tension in a Troubled Town"	John Peyser	Martin Roth	October 14, 1971	A019
Extreme emotions and hate along racial lines may have something to do with the theft of explosives.
6	"Code Name: Diana"	Ted Post	Harold Stone	October 22, 1971	A001
A major corporation is in danger of getting caught in tax fraud and dangles a half a million dollars in front of Nash to keep him quiet about it.
7	"The Ambassador's Daughter"	Ted Post	Ed Adamson	October 29, 1971	A014
A mixed race love affair is somehow tied to the kidnapping of an official.
8	"The Visitor"	Richard Chambers	Norman Katkov & Joyce Perry	November 2, 1971	A003
Homosexuality, blackmail and suicide intertwine dramatically and on many levels.
9	"The Friendliest Town in the South"	John Peyser	Harold Stone	November 5, 1971	A002
A small town in the American South has long memories and short tempers when a local black leader attempts to put together a protest march.
10	"The Time of the Eagle"	James Hogan	Edward J. Lakso	November 9, 1971	A020
The lives of two American Indian brothers revolve around heated politics and brutal murder.
11	"Where Have All The Children Gone?"	Ivan Dixon	John Bloch	November 16, 1971	A018
The government's nerve gas agent experiment and the disappearance of two dozen teenagers are somehow connected.
12	"The Dead We Left Behind"	Ivan Dixon	Story by : Shirl Hendryx; Teleplay by : Shirl Hendryx & Raymond Sinclair	November 23, 1971	A005
After coming home from Vietnam, a U.S. Marine is accused of murdering innocent Vietnamese women and children.
13	"Brother Zachary"	Richard Chambers	George Armitage & Raymond Sinclair	December 7, 1971	A028
An outreach ministry that lends help to drug addicts, helping them get straight, becomes the target of a biker gang who doesn't like the group doing away with their dope buying customers.
14	"A Killer Among Us"	James Hogan	Norman Katkov & Joyce Perry	December 14, 1971	A004
A Latin labor representative is murdered which ignites protests of racial hatred in the series finale.

== Music ==
"Theme from 'Monty Nash'" was written and produced by Michael Lloyd, and released as a single in 1971 on Quad Records (a division of Four Star International, the studio that syndicated and co-produced the series), credited as by The Good Stuff, a group of session players.
