= Top-rated United States television programs of 1966–67 =

This table displays the top-rated primetime television series of the 1966–67 season as measured by Nielsen Media Research.

Rank	Program	Network	Rating
1	Bonanza	NBC	29.1
2	The Red Skelton Hour	CBS	28.2
3	The Andy Griffith Show	CBS	27.4
4	The Lucy Show	CBS	26.2
5	The Jackie Gleason Show	CBS	25.3
6	Green Acres	CBS	24.6
7	Daktari	CBS	23.4
7	Bewitched	ABC	23.4
7	The Beverly Hillbillies	CBS	23.4
10	Gomer Pyle, U.S.M.C.	CBS	22.8
10	The Virginian	NBC	22.8
10	The Lawrence Welk Show	ABC	22.8
10	The Ed Sullivan Show	CBS	22.8
14	The Dean Martin Show	NBC	22.6
14	Family Affair	CBS	22.6
16	The Smothers Brothers Comedy Hour	CBS	22.2
17	Friday Night Movies	CBS	21.8
17	Hogan's Heroes	CBS	21.8
19	Walt Disney's Wonderful World of Color	NBC	21.5
20	Saturday Night at the Movies	NBC	21.4
21	Dragnet	NBC	21.2
22	Get Smart	NBC	21.0
23	Petticoat Junction	CBS	20.9
23	The Rat Patrol	ABC	20.9
25	Daniel Boone	NBC	20.8
26	Bob Hope Presents the Chrysler Theatre	NBC	20.7
27	Tarzan	NBC	20.5
28	ABC Sunday Night Movie	ABC	20.4
29	I Spy	NBC	20.2
29	CBS Thursday Movie	CBS	20.2
29	My Three Sons	CBS	20.2
29	The F.B.I.	ABC	20.2
