= Top-rated United States television programs of 1967–68 =

This table displays the top-rated primetime television series of the 1967–68 season as measured by Nielsen Media Research.

Rank	Program	Network	Rating
1	The Andy Griffith Show	CBS	27.6
2	The Lucy Show	CBS	27.0
3	Gomer Pyle, U.S.M.C.	CBS	25.6
4	Gunsmoke	CBS	25.5
4	Family Affair	CBS	25.5
4	Bonanza	NBC	25.5
7	The Red Skelton Show	CBS	25.3
8	The Dean Martin Show	NBC	24.8
9	The Jackie Gleason Show	CBS	23.9
10	Saturday Night at the Movies	NBC	23.6
11	Bewitched	ABC	23.5
12	The Beverly Hillbillies	CBS	23.3
13	The Ed Sullivan Show	CBS	23.2
14	The Virginian	NBC	22.9
15	Friday Night Movies	CBS	22.8
15	Green Acres	CBS	22.8
17	The Lawrence Welk Show	ABC	21.9
18	The Smothers Brothers Comedy Hour	CBS	21.7
19	Gentle Ben	CBS	21.5
20	Tuesday Night at the Movies	NBC	21.4
21	Rowan & Martin's Laugh-In	NBC	21.3
22	The F.B.I.	ABC	21.2
23	Thursday Night Movie	CBS	21.1
24	My Three Sons	CBS	20.8
25	Walt Disney's Wonderful World of Color	NBC	20.7
26	Ironside	NBC	20.5
27	The Carol Burnett Show	CBS	20.1
27	Dragnet	NBC	20.1
29	Daniel Boone	NBC	20.0
30	Lassie	CBS	19.9
30	It Takes a Thief	ABC	19.9
