= The Brotherhood of the Bell =

1970 film

- Screen-capture
- Written by: David Karp
- Directed by: Paul Wendkos
- Starring: Glenn Ford; Dean Jagger; Rosemary Forsyth; Maurice Evans; Will Geer; Robert Pine; Dabney Coleman
- Music by: Jerry Goldsmith
- Country of origin: United States
- Original language: English

Production
- Producer: David Karp
- Cinematography: Robert B. Hauser
- Editor: Carroll Sax
- Running time: 100 minutes

Original release
- Network: CBS
- Release: September 17, 1970

The Brotherhood of the Bell is a 1970 made-for-television movie produced by Cinema Center 100 Productions and starring Glenn Ford. The director Paul Wendkos was nominated in 1971 by the Directors Guild of America for "outstanding directorial achievement in television". David Karp wrote the screenplay based on his novel that had been previously filmed as a Studio One episode in 1958. This version aired as a "world premiere" CBS Thursday Night Movie.

The film depicts a successful economics professor, Dr. Andrew Patterson, who discovers that an elite fraternity he joined as an undergraduate is really a callous banking and business cabal that obtains wealth and power for its members through nefarious practices.

== Plot ==
Professor Andrew Patterson (Glenn Ford) returns to his alma mater, the College of St. George in San Francisco. He is attending the initiation of a new member into a secret society, the Brotherhood of the Bell. The man who initiated Patterson 22 years earlier, financier Chad Harmon (Dean Jagger), is presiding at the ceremony. Harmon gives Patterson an address and instructs him to go there to receive an assignment from the society; Patterson has been selected to prevent Dr. Konstantin Horvathy (Eduard Franz) from accepting a deanship at a college of linguistics. The Brotherhood wants this post for one of their own. Patterson is given dossiers of people who helped Horvathy defect to the United States, and he is to threaten to reveal these to the government of Horvathy's homeland if Horvathy accepts the new post. Against Brotherhood policy, Patterson consults Harmon about the legality and ethics of his assignment. Harmon tells Patterson to do it and be grateful that more is not asked of him.

Patterson returns home to Los Angeles and immediately contacts Dr. Horvathy. Unable to persuade him to decline the position, he presents him with photostats of the dossiers. Horvathy, who is a lifelong refugee from Fascism and Communism, commits suicide. Remorse causes Patterson to confide in his wife, Vivian (Rosemary Forsyth), and his father-in-law Harry Masters (Maurice Evans), and he announces a desire to reveal the Brotherhood's actions to the public.

In taking Patterson to see a certain Thaddeus Burns, a supposed agent of the Federal Security Services (the film's fictional version of the FBI), Masters is secretly helping the Brotherhood to recover the Horvathy dossiers before Patterson can use them in his plan to expose the Brotherhood. Burns takes the dossiers from Patterson, and Masters subsequently denies taking Patterson to see Burns. Patterson is alienated from his father-in-law and his wife, who then leaves him.

Patterson is informed by Chad Harmon that his and his father's achievements were not their own, but covert favors bestowed at the behest of the Brotherhood. After Patterson goes public with his exposé, his father (Will Geer), the CEO of a multi-million dollar company, is singled out by the IRS for fraud. The elder Patterson lashes out against Harry Masters in response, suffers a stroke and dies. Patterson is relieved of his professorship through the machinations of the Brotherhood.

Patterson finds himself increasingly isolated, and reaches rock bottom when he appears on a local television talk show. The host Bart Harris (William Conrad) humiliates him on the air, and Patterson lashes out at him, landing him in jail. He is bailed out by his former boss, Dr. Jerry Fielder (William Smithers), who discovered that Patterson was telling the truth. He encourages Patterson to convince another Brother of the Bell to come forward, someone who has nothing to gain by doing so. That someone turns out to be Philip Dunning (Robert Pine), the one initiated at the beginning of the story.

== Cast ==
- Glenn Ford as Prof. Andrew Patterson
- Rosemary Forsyth as Vivian Patterson
- Dean Jagger as Chad Harmon
- Maurice Evans as Harry Masters
- Will Geer as Mike Patterson
- Eduard Franz as Dr. Konstantin Horvathy
- William Conrad as Bart Harris
- Robert Pine as Philip Everest Dunning
- William Smithers as Dr. Jerome Fielder
- Logan Field as Thaddeus Burns
- Dabney Coleman as Agent Shephard
- Scott Graham as Weber, the Beta Epsilon Lambda house proctor

== Background ==
An earlier dramatic adaptation of the novel was made for the Studio One anthology series, and aired January 6, 1958.

Scenes at the fictional College of St. George were filmed at Pomona College.

== Home media ==
On December 8, 2015, CBS Broadcasting, Inc. released the DVD edition of the film. The approximate running time of the film presented in NTSC format is 97 minutes.

== See also ==
- List of American films of 1970
- The Skulls (2000 film)
