= Richard Jessup =

American writer

- Born: January 2, 1925; Savannah, Georgia
- Died: October 22, 1982 (aged 57)
- Occupation: Novelist
- Writing career
- Pen name: Richard Telfair
- Genres: Mystery, Westerns
- Notable work: The Cincinnati Kid

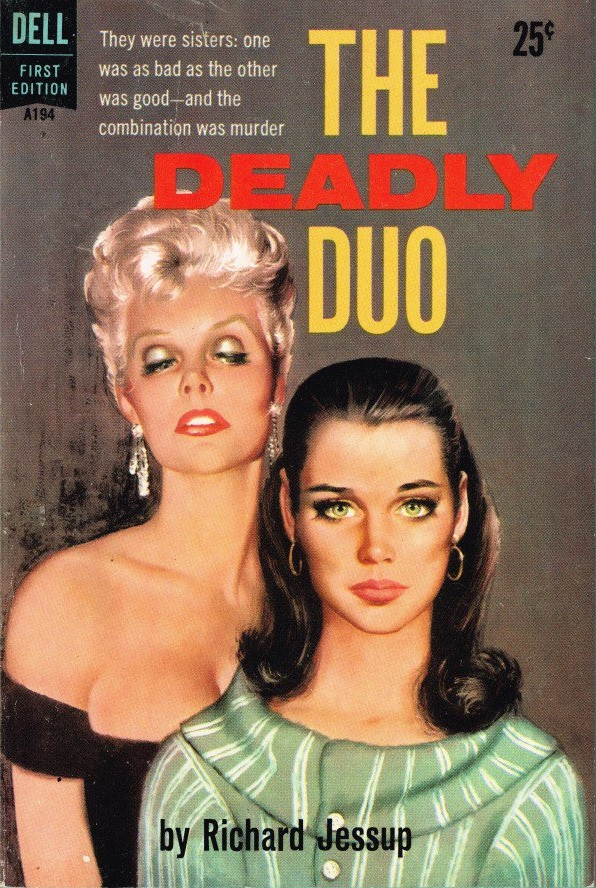
Cover of "The Deadly Duo" by Richard Jessup. Illustration by Freeman Elliott.

Richard Jessup (January 2, 1925 in Savannah, Georgia - October 22, 1982 in Nokomis, Florida) was an American author and screenwriter. He also wrote under the name of Richard Telfair.

== Biography ==
Jessup spent his early years in and out of a local orphanage before running away to sea as a merchant seaman. In an interview in 1970, he said that he had read himself around the world, ferreting out English-language bookshops at each port of call and reading a book a day while at sea. During this time, he copied War and Peace on a typewriter while afloat, corrected all the errors, then threw the work over the side. In 1948, he left the sea behind and began a career as a full-time writer, averaging 10 hours a day at the typewriter. He designed and built a home in Connecticut, where he lived until moving to Florida.

Several of his novels drew upon his experiences at sea; one of them, Sailor, about a youth who signs on as a merchant seaman and sails around the world, was described in The New York Times as a seafaring novel "written with salt spray and affection".

Jessup wrote more than 60 books, most of them paperback originals about crime (A Rage to Die), detectives (Cry Passion), Indigenous Americans (Comanche Vengeance) and intrigue (The Deadly Duo, made into a 1962 film). He wrote under several pseudonyms, including Richard Telfair, and he also wrote radio shows and television scripts.

His best-known work, The Cincinnati Kid, published in 1964 in hardcover and later made into a motion picture, was highly praised in The New York Times: "Mr. Jessup has brilliantly enlarged the microcosm of the gambling table, to make it a genuine setting for a novel," said the reviewer. "Within its circle, men act out, again and again, their commitment against the gratuitousness and terror of fate. Some turn into machines that bleed inside. And others come to know finally that they are human beings."

Jessup attributed much of his outlook to a chance meeting with Albert Camus in Marseille in 1945, during which they drank together for hours and the philosopher impressed upon the 20-year-old seaman his existential philosophy.

Jessup wrote the book and the screenplay for Chuka, about the lone survivor of a massacre by Arapahos in the 1870s. Jessup also wrote Foxway, a novel published in 1971 about a psychologically distraught young combat veteran of the Vietnam War. His last novel, Threat, published in 1981, also dealt with a Vietnam veteran, one who was working his way through Columbia University by robbing bookies in an effort to raise ransom money for his twin brother, a prisoner of the North Vietnamese.

== Works ==
=== Novels ===
- The Cunning and the Haunted (Fawcett - 1954)
- A Rage to Die (Fawcett - 1955)
- Cry Passion (Dell - 1956)
- Night Boat to Paris (Dell - 1956)
- The Young Don't Cry (Fawcett - 1957)
- The Man in Charge (Secker - 1957)
- Comanche Vengeance (Fawcett Gold Medal - 1957)
- Lowdown (Dell - 1958)
- The Deadly Duo (Dell - 1959)
- Chuka (Fawcett Gold Medal - 1961)
- Port Angelique (Fawcett - 1961)
- Wolf Cop (Fawcett - 1961)
- The Cincinnati Kid (Little, Brown and Co. - 1963)
- The Recreation Hall (Little, Brown and Co. - 1967)
- Sailor (Little, Brown and Co. - 1969)
- A Quiet Voyage Home (Little, Brown and Co. - 1970)
- Foxway (Little, Brown and Co. - 1971)
- Sabadilla (The Book Service Ltd, London - 1973)
- The Hot Blue Sea (Doubleday - 1974)
- Threat (Viking - 1981)

as Richard Telfair

- The Bloody Medallion (Fawcett - 1959)
- The Corpse That Talked (Ditto - 1959)
- Sundance (Fawcett - 1959), original novel based on the western TV series Hotel de Paree
- Scream Bloody Murder (Fawcett - 1960)
- Good Luck Sucker (Ditto - 1961)
- The Slavers (Fawcett - 1961)
- Target for Tonight (Dell - 1962), original novel based on the first version of the TV series Danger Man

== Printed works ==
His first published novel was The Cunning and the Haunted published in 1954 based on his experiences in orphanages. In the same year, Jessup wrote a teleplay for Tom Corbett, Space Cadet. The novel was filmed as The Young Don't Cry in 1957 with Jessup writing the screenplay for the film with Sal Mineo as the lead.

He began writing Westerns in 1957 with Cheyenne Saturday and finishing with Chuka where he wrote the screenplay for the film of the same name for actor and producer Rod Taylor. Jessup wrote a series of three Westerns featuring Wyoming Jones under the name Richard Telfair. With his Western series ending, in the same year he wrote again as Telfair for a series of spy novels featuring Montgomery Nash. He used the name Telfair for an original novel based on the TV series Danger Man (the half-hour precursor to "Secret Agent", as it was known in the US) called Target for Tonight in 1962.

Inspired by The Hustler, Jessup wrote a novel of poker playing called The Cincinnati Kid that was filmed with Steve McQueen. In 1962, another of his novels, The Deadly Duo, was also filmed.

In 1969, he wrote Sailor based on his experiences as a merchant seaman.

Otto Preminger bought the rights to his novel Foxway for filming, but the movie was never made.

His final work was Threat published in 1981.

He died of cancer in 1982.
