= Chuka (film) =

1967 film by Gordon Douglas

- Theatrical release poster
- Directed by: Gordon Douglas
- Written by: Richard Jessup; Rod Tayor (uncredited)
- Based on: novel by Richard Jessup
- Produced by: Jack Jason; Rod Taylor
- Starring: Rod Taylor; Ernest Borgnine; John Mills; Luciana Paluzzi; Victoria Vetri; James Whitmore; Michael Cole; Joseph Sirola
- Cinematography: Harold E. Stine
- Edited by: Robert Wyman
- Music by: Leith Stevens
- Production company: Rodlor
- Distributed by: Paramount Pictures
- Release dates: May 11, 1967 (Premiere); July 23, 1967
- Running time: 95 minutes
- Country: United States
- Language: English
- Budget: $1.7 million
- Box office: 14,545 admissions (France)

Chuka is a 1967 American Western film starring Rod Taylor who also produced it and worked on the screenplay. The film was directed by Gordon Douglas and is based on 1961 novel by Richard Jessup, who also wrote the screenplay.

== Plot ==
The film begins with a U.S. Army commander dictating a report. Held prisoner in the commander's office, in a fort that has been almost totally destroyed, is the Arapaho Indian war chief, Hanu (Marco Lopez). He says very little. Within the fort's ruins have been found a single grave and a Colt pistol once owned by a gunman Hanu describes as a "quiet, lonely man..." At this point the action of the movie commences.

A wandering gunman, Chuka (Rod Taylor), rides into an Arapaho camp. It is winter and everyone in the camp is starving, so he gives them some food. Shortly afterwards Chuka crosses paths with a stagecoach taking Mexican passengers Senora Veronica Kleitz (Luciana Paluzzi) and her niece Senorita Helena Chavez (Victoria Vetri) through the territory. Chuka and Kleitz look hard at each other. Suddenly mounted Arapaho warriors, led by Hanu, surround the coach. Everyone connected to the stagecoach expects to be killed, but Hanu recognizes Chuka and the braves simply ride on. Chuka accompanies the coach to a nearby U.S. Army fort. The outpost's commander, Colonel Stuart Valois (John Mills), is worried the Arapahos may have ambushed his overdue patrol and refuses to allow the civilians to leave. He sends out his scout Lou Trent (James Whitmore) to reconnoiter, but the horse returns without the rider.

Everybody in the fort has a past they would rather forget. Before he became a hired gunman, Chuka was in love with Kleitz, but because he was only a lowly hired hand on her wealthy father's ranch, he was run off. She dutifully married a man selected by her father from their own social class. The soldiers are the dregs of the army. Valois was cashiered from the British Army for suspected cowardice, including being drunk when his command was attacked. His second-in-command, Major Benson (Louis Hayward), is a card cheat, and also (though Valois does not know it) keeps an Arapaho mistress hidden within the fort. Lieutenant Daly was acquitted of a charge of treason. Most of these revelations are told during dinner by Colonel Valois, to humiliate the men involved. Only Sergeant Otto Hansbach (Ernest Borgnine) is a first-rate soldier. When the coach arrived at the fort he had been overseeing the flogging of a soldier, Spivey (Michael Cole), for desertion. Hansbach takes an immediate dislike to Chuka.

The fort is constantly being infiltrated by Arapaho warriors, which would be more successful if not for Chuka's instincts and shooting skills. Recognizing that he is no match for Chuka with a gun, Hansbach challenges Chuka to a fight over the latter's threateningly defiant refusal to obey Valois's order to work for the fort as a scout. A brutal fist fight follows, which ends in a draw.

Chuka is paid $200 to sneak out and scout the enemy for Valois; in the process, he rescues Trent. On his return he tries to renew the relationship with Kleitz, who is now a widow, but she tells him it is too late. He offers to take the two women to safety, but by the time Kleitz asks him to flee with her niece, the fort is under threat of imminent attack. Chuka tells her in any case he would only have tried to flee if she rather than her niece would have gone with him.

Having seen the size of Hanu's force and the tactics the Arapaho are practicing, Chuka urges Valois to abandon the fort and leave the food and supplies inside, which is all Hanu wants. Valois will not consider it, even though his force is hopelessly outnumbered. Before the Arapahos attack he suppresses an attempted mutiny of his soldiers, shooting the ringleader Spivey in the process. Chuka guesses, and Valois confirms, it was the first time he has killed a man. (During the contentious dinner Valois had attempted to provoke Chuka by asking him how many men he had killed.) As they await the attack, Senora Kleitz goes to Chuka and they have an intimate encounter. Later, over coffee, Hansbach and Chuka talk in a friendly manner, and Hansbach explains his absolute loyalty to his commander. When Hansbach was a young soldier under Valois's command in the Sudan, he blundered and was captured by the enemy. Valois's unit rescued Hansbach from torture and certain death, but Valois was captured and castrated. Valois was eventually rescued, but was left deeply scarred psychologically as well as physically.

The Arapahos attack. They get help from inside the fort, when Major Benson's Arapaho mistress, after stabbing him to death, sets fire to the stables. When the walls of the fort are breached, Senora Kleitz and Valois are killed. Kleitz dies in Chuka's arms. Enraged, he shoots wildly at the Arapaho overrunning the walls. Valois, with his last words, laments that he was struck down too soon to learn if he is indeed a coward. Hansbach is fatally shot, as he slumps to his death he sees his fallen commander. With all the soldiers dead, and he himself seriously wounded, Chuka hides with Helena Chavez while the victorious Arapahos take the fort's supplies and leave. As Hanu rides through the burning fort on a final inspection, Chuka takes aim at him with his pistol. Hanu sees the two of them in their hiding spot. Chuka recoils and puts his pistol to Helena's head, ready to kill her to keep her from being taken by the attackers. Expressionless, Hanu slowly follows his braves into the night. Presumably he again recognized Chuka, and having taken the fort is satisfied. Hanu's debt to Chuka, if he ever owed one, is doubly paid.

Back in the present, the commander is finishing his report. He says he will not disturb the grave to discover who is buried there. Of Chuka and Helena there is no sign, but as a relationship between them was foreshadowed it is to be inferred that they somehow left the fort together, after burying Señora Kleitz.

== Cast ==
- Rod Taylor as Chuka (so named because, as a child, he hung around chuckwagons)
- Ernest Borgnine as Sergeant Otto Hansbach
- John Mills as Colonel Stuart Valois
- Luciana Paluzzi as Veronica Kleitz
- James Whitmore as Lou Trent
- Victoria Vetri as Helena Chavez (as Angela Dorian)
- Louis Hayward as Major Benson
- Michael Cole as Spivey
- Hugh Reilly as Captain Carrol, the fort's doctor
- Barry O'Hara as Slim, the cook
- Joseph Sirola as Baldwin, who rode shotgun on the stagecoach
- Marco Lopez as Hanu (as Marco Antonio)
- Gerald York as Lieutenant Daly
- Herlinda Del Carmen as the Indian girl brought in to sleep with Benson; she later stabs him to death

== Production ==
The novel was optioned in 1964 by New Art Productions, the company of Howard Gotbetter and Jack Jason. Jason called the novel "an American Beau Geste." Rod Taylor became attached in 1966, as actor and producer. The film initially had a running time of 105 minutes but was cut, including a prologue, prior to its premiere. The prologue was considered complicated, held up the action and spoiled the ending.

== Reception ==
Variety called it an "excellent oater drama" with outstanding directing. He called the two-minute fist fight between Borgnine and Taylor "one of the most effective brawls in recent years." The film performed disappointingly at the box office and remains the only film on which Rod Taylor was credited as producer.
