= CBS Thursday Night Movie =

American television series

- Still frame from the animated CBS "color" logo, used by the network at the start of each broadcast of the Thursday Night Movie that featured a color film.
- Genre: Film Anthology
- Country of origin: United States
- Original language: English

Production
- Running time: 2 hours or more (depending on feature's length)

Original release
- Network: CBS
- Release: September 16, 1965 – November 20, 1975

The CBS Thursday Night Movie is the network's venture into the weekly televising of then-recent theatrical films, debuting at the start of the 1965–1966 season, from 9:00 to 11 p.m. (Eastern Time). Unlike its two competitors (NBC and ABC), CBS had delayed running feature films at the behest of the network's hierarchy. Indeed, as far back as 1960, when Paramount Pictures offered a huge backlog of titles for sale to television for $50 million, James T. Aubrey, program director at CBS, negotiated with the studio to buy the package for the network. Aubrey summed up his thinking this way: "I decided that the feature film was the thing for TV. A $250,000 specially-tailored television show just could not compete with a film that cost three or four million dollars." However, the network's chairman, William Paley, who considered the scheduling of old movies "uncreative", vetoed the Paramount transaction.

It was not until after Aubrey's departure from CBS in early 1965 that Paley finally conceded on the issue and cleared the way for the network to embark on its own prime-time weekly movie broadcast. After completing negotiations with various studios that year, the network acquired exclusive rights to televise a total of 90 titles from Columbia Pictures, United Artists, Paramount, and Warner Brothers—news of which resulted in rumors that the network would actually slate films for two prime-time nights rather than just one. This scheduling addition, however, would not be made until a season later; but reports of further meetings between CBS and Columbia over the acquisition of 20 more titles signaled that the network was now a serious movie-night contender. The Thursday Night Movie thus began on September 16, 1965, with the television debut of the original The Manchurian Candidate (1962), starring Frank Sinatra and Laurence Harvey.

== Controversy ==
CBS's new anthology was not to escape notoriety, as the network learned the evening of September 30. During its running of the Jack Lemmon-Kim Novak comedy, The Notorious Landlady, someone at the controls of the film's broadcast inadvertently got the reels mixed up, and it was with some chagrin that a network announcer issued an apology during a commercial break before a substantial portion of the movie was then replayed just to get the continuity back on track. What started out, therefore, as a 2-hour-and-15-minute airing wound up lasting approximately three hours. Then a month later, when the Burt Lancaster film Elmer Gantry (1960) was televised with approximately 30 minutes total in various deletions from its original 146-minute length, viewers complained that because of all the omissions, the movie made little sense. In fact, quite a few entries in the Thursday night anthology during the first season were over 2 hours long—and this was without commercial interruptions. These included The Counterfeit Traitor (1961; 140 minutes), Parrish (1961; 138 minutes), Ocean's 11 (1960; 127 minutes), Mary, Mary (1963; 126 minutes), and Sunrise at Campobello (1960; 144 minutes). Before their broadcast, each of these films was cut to accommodate what CBS executives deemed a feasible running-time. Sunrise at Campobello, in particular, suffered a loss of nearly an hour from its footage after the network pared it down to a 2-hour broadcast including advertisements. Even so, CBS's affiliated stations were still forced on more than a few occasions to delay the start of their local 11:00 (ET) Thursday night newscasts.

In one case, however—that of the Anthony Quinn film Requiem for a Heavyweight (1962)—the network considered the entry too short. Requiem had a running time of 85 minutes, but this was judged untenable by CBS executives. Columbia Pictures, the film's theatrical distributor, was contacted and arrangements were made to "pad" the film with extra footage. According to the movie's producer, David Susskind, there were 40 minutes of outtakes from the film in the studio's vault that had to be located. It was from these that an extra 10 minutes was assembled and added to the CBS print. In fact, this is believed to be "the first time television has added footage to a movie."

== First season (1965–66) ==
All lists of titles and show-dates in this article were culled from the archives of The New York Times, Corpus Christi Caller-Times, and the Milwaukee Journal Sentinel via microfilm.

1. 1965-09-16: The Manchurian Candidate (1962)
2. 1965-09-23: The Counterfeit Traitor (1962)
3. 1965-09-30: The Notorious Landlady (1962)
4. 1965-10-07: Parrish (1961)
5. 1965-10-14: Houseboat (1958)
6. 1965-10-21: Ocean's 11 (1960)
7. 1965-10-28: Mary, Mary (1963)
8. 1965-11-04: Elmer Gantry (1960)
9. 1965-11-11: The Wackiest Ship in the Army (1960)
10. 1965-11-18: Experiment in Terror (1962)
11. 1965-11-25: Mysterious Island (1961)
12. 1965-12-02: The Bramble Bush (1960)
13. 1965-12-09: Merrill's Marauders (1962)
14. 1965-12-16: Two Rode Together (1961)
15. 1965-12-23: Sunrise at Campobello (1960)
16. 1965-12-30: Rome Adventure (1962)
17. 1966-01-06: Requiem for a Heavyweight (1962)
18. 1966-01-13: Cry for Happy (1961)
19. 1966-01-20: The War Lover (1962)
20. 1966-01-27: The Running Man (1963)
21. 1966-02-03: Guns of Darkness (1962)
22. 1966-02-10: A Fever in the Blood (1961)
23. 1966-02-17: Susan Slade (1961)
24. 1966-02-24: Harvey (1950)
25. 1966-03-03: The Devil at 4 O'Clock (1961)
26. 1966-03-10: The Interns (1962)
27. 1966-03-17: The Notorious Landlady (1962) (Rerun)
28. 1966-03-24: The Ladies Man (1961)
29. 1966-03-31: Gidget Goes Hawaiian (1961)
30. 1966-04-07: The Best of Enemies (1961)
31. 1966-04-14: Elmer Gantry (1960) (Rerun)
32. 1966-04-21: A Majority of One (1961)
33. 1966-04-28: Houseboat (1958) (Rerun)
34. 1966-05-05: John Paul Jones (1959)

From here through the summer, the remaining broadcasts consisted of reruns of many of the above films. The series' initial season thus comprised a total of 31 movies–12 from Warner Brothers, 13 from Columbia, 3 from Paramount, 2 from United Artists, plus one classic (Harvey) from Universal Studios in a transaction involving an aborted TV-movie deal. (See the article section below on the "Rise of the Made-for-TV Movie.") The next season, CBS would add a second anthology on Friday nights. The network's movie schedule for the 1966-67 season would begin in September with the Thursday Night Movie's television debut of the first half of The Music Man (1962), starring Robert Preston and Shirley Jones. The concluding half of the film would be televised the following evening as the premiere offering of the new CBS Friday Night Movie.

== The 1966–67 and '67–68 seasons: Thursdays and Fridays ==
Among the films CBS had acquired from Paramount Pictures in 1965, there included the Alfred Hitchcock shocker Psycho (1960), which was scheduled for premiere the night of Friday, September 23, 1966. However, just days before the film was to air, U.S. Senatorial candidate Charles H. Percy's (R-Illinois) college-aged daughter, Valerie, was reported slain by an unknown assailant, and details of the crime went viral in the national print and TV-radio media, including one news article that described the "blonde and pretty" Miss Percy as having been "beaten and stabbed to death in her bed." The inevitable analogy between Valerie Percy and a "blonde and pretty" Janet Leigh, plus the fact that both the senator's daughter and the Leigh character in the film were both murdered while in a vulnerable state (Miss Leigh in the shower, Miss Percy while asleep) became too much of a coincidence for some of the network's affiliates in the Midwest who announced they would not carry the film. Thus, shortly before Psycho's broadcast, CBS, without notice, yanked it in favor of a Frank Sinatra war film Kings Go Forth (1958). Later that year, CBS decided not to air Psycho at any future date. The film was thus canceled altogether despite the hefty $500,000 price that CBS had paid Paramount for exclusive rights to televise the movie.

The preemption of Psycho aside, however, the 1966-67 season saw an increase over the previous season in the number of Paramount films televised on CBS. These included Grace Kelly's Academy Award-winning performance in The Country Girl (1954), Marlon Brando's only directorial effort, One-Eyed Jacks (1961), and the Jerry Lewis comedy, The Delicate Delinquent (1957). Columbia Pictures also made a strong showing during the Thursday Night Movie's second season with such entries as Sam Peckinpah's Civil War epic Major Dundee (1964) and the Jack Lemmon comedy, Good Neighbor Sam (1964). But Warner Brothers output, so prominent throughout the anthology's first season, consisted of only five features—and one of those was the animated Gay Purr-ee (1963), a film targeting the pre-teen audience and broadcast just two days before Christmas. Additionally, United Artists pictures during the season also totaled only five; however, the televising of one of those entries, Lilies of the Field (1963), became of particular interest when it was reported that its director, Ralph Nelson, was "given the privilege [by CBS] of editing his own movie for television presentation." Further, Nelson was allowed to insert commercial breaks anywhere he wanted. He was even successful in negotiating a bit of risqué dialogue delivered by Sidney Poitier, the film's star. Given that this occurred just a year after producer-director George Stevens had sued NBC over its telecast of his movie A Place in the Sun (1951), arguing that "the network would damage the film by interrupting the narrative with a series of commercials", this move by CBS to collaborate with a filmmaker on the broadcast of his own work suggested that commerce could, on occasion, co-exist with art. Also of note, the religiously-themed film aired on Good Friday.

Thursdays (1966–67):

1. 1966-09-15: The Music Man (1962), Part 1
2. 1966-09-22: Good Neighbor Sam (1964)
3. 1966-09-29: By Love Possessed (1961)
4. 1966-10-06: Breakfast at Tiffany's (1962)
5. 1966-10-13: The Victors (1963)
6. 1966-10-20: The Rat Race (1960)
7. 1966-10-27: All in a Night's Work (1961)
8. 1966-11-03: Fail Safe (1964)
9. 1966-11-10: Advise & Consent (1962)
10. 1966-11-17: The Country Girl (1954)
11. 1966-11-24: Jason and the Argonauts (1963)
12. 1966-12-01: Love Has Many Faces (1965)
13. 1966-12-08: (Pre-empted by the network)
14. 1966-12-15: Baby the Rain Must Fall (1965)
15. 1966-12-22: A Raisin in the Sun (1961)
16. 1966-12-29: Five Finger Exercise (1962)
17. 1967-01-05: Summer and Smoke (1961)
18. 1967-01-12: A Summer Place (1959)
19. 1967-01-19: My Geisha (1962)
20. 1967-01-26: Behold a Pale Horse (1964)
21. 1967-02-02: The Pleasure of His Company (1961)
22. 1967-02-09: The Caretakers (1963)
23. 1967-02-16: One-Eyed Jacks (1961) (Rerun)
24. 1967-02-23: Two for the Seesaw (1962)
25. 1967-03-02: Bye Bye Birdie (1963) (Rerun)
26. 1967-03-09: The Sins of Rachel Cade (1961)
27. 1967-03-16: Major Dundee (1964) (Rerun)
28. 1967-03-23: The Counterfeit Traitor (1961) (Rerun from '65-'66)
29. 1967-03-30: Underworld USA (1961)
30. 1967-04-06: Branded (1950) (Rerun)
31. 1967-04-13: About Mrs. Leslie (1954)
32. 1967-04-20: A Raisin in the Sun (1961) (Rerun)
33. 1967-04-27: Toys in the Attic (1963)

Fridays (1966–67):

1. 1966-09-16: The Music Man, Part 2
2. 1966-09-23: Kings Go Forth (1958)
3. 1966-09-30: The Geisha Boy (1958)
4. 1966-10-07: Branded (1950)
5. 1966-10-14: Bye Bye Birdie (1963)
6. 1966-10-21: One-Eyed Jacks (1961)
7. 1966-10-28: Gidget Goes to Rome (1963)
8. 1966-11-04: First Men in the Moon (1964)
9. 1966-11-11: Major Dundee (1964)
10. 1966-11-18: Because They're Young (1960)
11. 1966-11-25: Barabbas (1961)
12. 1966-12-02: The Man from the Diner's Club (1963)
13. 1966-12-09: Genghis Khan (1965)
14. 1966-12-16: Sail a Crooked Ship (1961)
15. 1966-12-23: Gay Purr-ee (1963)
16. 1966-12-30: Damn the Defiant! (1962)
17. 1967-01-06: Five Branded Women (1960)
18. 1967-01-13: PT 109 (1963)
19. 1967-01-20: The Delicate Delinquent (1957)
20. 1967-01-27: Die! Die! My Darling! (1965)
21. 1967-02-03: Island of Love (1963)
22. 1967-02-10: Good Neighbor Sam (1964) (Rerun)
23. 1967-02-17: Pepe (1960)
24. 1967-02-24: Breakfast at Tiffany's (1962) (Rerun)
25. 1967-03-03: The Pigeon That Took Rome (1961)
26. 1967-03-10: The Geisha Boy (1958) (Rerun)
27. 1967-03-17: Escape from Zahrain (1962)
28. 1967-03-24: Lilies of the Field (1963)
29. 1967-03-31: The Victors (1963) (Rerun)
30. 1967-04-07: The Long Ships (1963)
31. 1967-04-14: All in a Night's Work (1961) (Rerun)
32. 1967-04-21: Gay Purr-ee (1963) (Rerun)
33. 1967-04-28: Advise & Consent (1962) (Rerun)

The broadcast of Toys in the Attic in late April was the final CBS premiere of a theatrical film during the season. From May through August of that year, the series consisted of reruns. For the most part, features that had premiered on a Thursday night were rebroadcast months later on a Friday night, while Friday's premieres aired later in the season on a Thursday.

The following September, the CBS Thursday Night Movie began its third season with a film from a new package of Metro-Goldwyn Mayer movies—Jack Cardiff's Young Cassidy (1965), a bio-pic on the life of Irish playwright Seán O'Casey. Then the next evening, the Friday Night Movie kicked off its sophomore year with an oddity: American-International Pictures' Beach Party (1963), the first of a series of zany romantic comedies featuring Frankie Avalon and Annette Funicello. Additionally, the network poured forth the remainder of United Artists titles acquired two years earlier—a balance of 20 motion pictures, including Stanley Kramer's tense racial drama The Defiant Ones (1958), Jules Dassin's caper classic Topkapi (1964), as well as the inspirational One Man's Way (1964), based on the life of the influential pastor, Norman Vincent Peale. In fact, CBS aired this film on April 4, 1968, the night of the assassination of Martin Luther King Jr.; it seemed an especially apt gesture by the network, even if the film had been scheduled months earlier for just that very evening. Among the network's other offerings, Warner Brothers movies maintained their steady minority presence, among them actor Vic Morrow's eccentric interpretation of Prohibition-era bootlegger Dutch Schultz in Portrait of a Mobster (1961)—a film so violent that its repeat performance in June 1968 had to be postponed for a later broadcast, as it had been scheduled just two days after the slaying of presidential candidate Robert F. Kennedy. It was replaced by a rerun of the aforementioned One Man's Way.

As the CBS Thursday (and Friday) Night Movie entered the 1967-68 season, media critics took increased notice of the mature topics and risque themes explored in network movies—subject matter heretofore considered taboo in TV-land. For example, Jack Gould of The New York Times, singled out the network's September 1967 broadcast of Billy Wilder's The Apartment (1960), with its frank yet satirical treatment of office politics and adultery. Gould noted "[t]he paradox...that in shows expressly produced for TV there continues to be the traditional concern over the preservation of blandness to suit all age groups. Matters of sex, let alone hints of extramarital relationships, are skirted like the plague." But with the showing of The Apartment (an Academy Award-winner for Best Picture) and other movies that tackled risky subjects, Gould concluded that "as the networks buy even more recent films, the trend [to challenge previous taboos] will very likely increase." A week later, Gould observed that "there appears to be no denying that films of feature length...have established themselves as the most stable form of TV program"—stable, at least, in the sense that all three major networks had, by then, each committed two nights per week of their prime-time schedules to old but recent films. And Gould's colleague, George Gent, writing on the same page and same issue of the Times, confirmed this sentiment after "national Nielsen figures" revealed that CBS's two-part TV-premiere of the prisoner-of-war drama The Great Escape (1963) had been ranked #1 and #2 of that week's most-watched programs. "Audience taste," concluded Gent, "continues to run in the direction of feature-length movies," and the networks appeared to agree. For word came that ABC and CBS "were together investing a whopping $92 million in the acquisition of 112 feature length movies for television over the next five years."

Not all industry observers, however, were receptive to this new trend in viewership. Syndicated entertainment writer Cynthia Lowry, for example, noted that CBS, as well as its two competitors, were engaged in the programming practice of front-loading—in other words, "piling in early the best feature-films." She warned that later "they will have to put on some of the turkeys—and there are those in every package." Lowry further complained that as a result of the popularity of old movies, new TV programs were "suffering seriously this season from the competition" while attempting to establish a loyal fan base of their own during the crucial first weeks of their broadcast. Ms. Lowry's objections notwithstanding, however, as long as movie anthologies continued to deliver better-than-average product, superior viewer ratings would continue to endure—which they did. Below is listed the entire CBS roster for a season that began with bubbling confidence.

Thursdays (1967–68):

1. 1967-09-07: Young Cassidy (1965)
2. 1967-09-14: The Great Escape (1963), Part 1
3. 1967-09-21: The Apartment (1960)
4. 1967-09-28: Cat on a Hot Tin Roof (1958)
5. 1967-10-05: The Yellow Rolls-Royce (1964)
6. 1967-10-12: Splendor in the Grass (1961)
7. 1967-10-19: The Defiant Ones (1958)
8. 1967-10-26: Critic's Choice (1963)
9. 1967-11-02: Days of Wine and Roses (1962)
10. 1967-11-09: The 7th Dawn (1964)
11. 1967-11-16: Woman of Straw (1964)
12. 1967-11-23: PT 109 (1963) (Rerun from '66–'67)
13. 1967-11-30: The Money Trap (1965)
14. 1967-12-07: Under Capricorn (1949)
15. 1967-12-14: Party Girl (1958)
16. 1967-12-21: I Could Go On Singing (1963)
17. 1967-12-28: Stolen Hours (1963)
18. 1968-01-04: The Music Man (1962), Part 1 (Rerun from '66–'67)
19. 1968-01-11: Topkapi (1964)
20. 1968-01-18: Torpedo Run (1958)
21. 1968-01-25: Where the Spies Are (1965)
22. 1968-02-01: Young Dillinger (1965)
23. 1968-02-08: The Man Who Shot Liberty Valance (1962) (Rerun)
24. 1968-02-15: I Want to Live! (1958)
25. 1968-02-22: The Great Escape (1963), Part 1 (Rerun)
26. 1968-02-29: Spencer's Mountain (1963) (Rerun)
27. 1968-03-07: The Best Man (1964)
28. 1968-03-14: The Thin Red Line (1964)
29. 1968-03-21: Goodbye Again (1961)
30. 1968-03-28: A Night to Remember (1958)
31. 1968-04-04: One Man's Way (1964)
32. 1968-04-11: Kings of the Sun (1963)
33. 1968-04-18: Escape from East Berlin (1962) (Rerun)
34. 1968-04-25: Circle of Deception (1960)

Fridays (1967–68):

1. 1967-09-08: Beach Party (1963)
2. 1967-09-15: The Great Escape (1963), Part 2
3. 1967-09-22: The Man Who Shot Liberty Valance (1962)
4. 1967-09-29: North by Northwest (1959)
5. 1967-10-06: Viva Las Vegas (1964)
6. 1967-10-13: Spencer's Mountain (1963)
7. 1967-10-20: Love Is a Ball (1963)
8. 1967-10-27: Rampage (1963)
9. 1967-11-03: McLintock! (1963)
10. 1967-11-10: Palm Springs Weekend (1963)
11. 1967-11-17: Call Me Bwana (1963)
12. 1967-11-24: Around the World Under the Sea (1966)
13. 1967-12-01: The Horizontal Lieutenant (1962)
14. 1967-12-08: Tickle Me (1965)
15. 1967-12-15: Wall of Noise (1963)
16. 1967-12-22: Escape from East Berlin (1962)
17. 1967-12-29: Portrait of a Mobster (1961)
18. 1968-01-05: The Music Man (1962), Part 2 (Rerun from '66-'67)
19. 1968-01-12: A Shot in the Dark (1964)
20. 1968-01-19: 633 Squadron (1964)
21. 1968-01-26: Island of Love (1963)
22. 1968-02-02: The Apartment (1960) (Rerun)
23. 1968-02-09: The Secret Invasion (1964)
24. 1968-02-16: The World of Henry Orient (1964)
25. 1968-02-23: The Great Escape (1963), Part 2 (Rerun)
26. 1968-03-01: Flight from Ashiya (1964)
27. 1968-03-08: The Sins of Rachel Cade (1961) (Rerun from '66-'67)
28. 1968-03-15: McLintock! (1963) (Rerun)
29. 1968-03-22: The Destructors (1968)
30. 1968-03-29: The Hellions (1961)
31. 1968-04-05: Your Cheatin' Heart (1964)
32. 1968-04-12: Joan of Arc (1948)
33. 1968-04-19: Young Cassidy (1965) (Rerun)
34. 1968-04-26: The Defiant Ones (1958) (Rerun)

From May through August 1968, many of the above films were re-issued as CBS prepared a new schedule for its two anthologies. In terms of quality and viewer attention, it was to mark the beginning of a dismal time for network movies.

== The 1968–69 and '69–70 seasons: A decline in audience ==
Just as the previous season had begun with the biography of a playwright (Seán O'Casey), CBS followed up in early September 1968 with another film based on a stage author's life. This time, it was Moss Hart, and the movie was Act One (1963), based on Hart's best-selling autobiography of the same title. Act One had already aired on local stations in a few markets, but this was its first network showing. Thus, CBS declared the actual premiere date of the Thursday Night Movie's fourth season as September 26, when another biographical picture, the musical Gypsy, starring Natalie Wood as burlesque queen Gypsy Rose Lee, made its television bow. The next evening, a second Natalie Wood attraction, Sex and the Single Girl (1964), initiated a third year's roster for the CBS Friday Night Movie. This entry garnered a lot of box-office in its heyday, but critics had labeled it a dud. In fact, similarly harsh judgments had been passed by critics on most of the other films CBS ran that season. With the exception of John Ford's Cheyenne Autumn (1964)—and even some of Ford's biographers refused to rank this among the director's best—the movies offered by the network's anthology in the fall of 1968 were by and large an inferior collection. Warner Brothers contributions, for example, ranged from soap-opera pathos (Youngblood Hawke, which The New York Times called "as thin and glossy as wax paper") to wooden heroics (the Troy Donahue western, A Distant Trumpet, with a story that "looked implausible or just plain hollow.") Additionally, such MGM fluff as Quick Before It Melts (1964) could hardly be called a game-saver. Top it off with the Thanksgiving night showing of the same studio's Marco the Magnificent (1965), described by one critic as "long on spectacle and short on plot", and you have the ingredients to a disastrous season.

Meanwhile, the movies ABC and NBC offered their viewers appeared to be equally unattractive because when the Nielsen ratings for the November 1968 sweeps were released, not a single network movie telecast finished in the Top 20—an interesting predicament considering the lofty pronouncements made a year earlier by top media observers concerning the popularity of feature films on television. But as CBS vice-president Michael Dann noted, "There has been a decided shift [in audience] since the opening of the season. I think you will see a decline in all movies for television." And as Rick Du Brow, UPI's television critic, confirmed:

The drop in audience occurred almost immediately after the season began. And there is no sign that televised network movies will recoup their former popularity, except for an occasional blockbuster, a fluke hit, or a film starring a personality who happens to be a tremendous favorite. The national video ratings for the week ending December 8, for instance, indicated that of 6 motion pictures shown on the three networks, the highest-ranked one among all television shows listed came in 35th.

Furthermore, Du Brow offered an explanation for this negative trend, one that went far beyond the inferiority of the films themselves. In short, he believed that audiences were "getting weary of the old-style approach" and that adherence to conventional modes of presentation by the networks had become constrictive, obsolete, and irrelevant for modern audiences. By means of contrast, the columnist held up newer, hip, innovative variety shows (like NBC's topical and sardonic Rowan & Martin's Laugh-In) as a means of advancing toward that "new-style approach" that in the late 1960s attracted the most viewers. As for 3-year-old feature-films like some of those listed below, however, they were declared old-hat.

Thursdays (1968–69):

1. 1968-09-12: Act One (1963)
2. 1968-09-19: Westward the Women (1951)
3. 1968-09-26: Gypsy (1962)
4. 1968-10-03: The Night of the Iguana (1964)
5. 1968-10-10: The Glass Bottom Boat (1965)
6. 1968-10-17: Youngblood Hawke (1964)
7. 1968-10-24: Harum Scarum (1965)
8. 1968-10-31: The Nanny (1965)
9. 1968-11-07: The World, the Flesh, and the Devil (1959)
10. 1968-11-14: God's Little Acre (1958)
11. 1968-11-21: Cheyenne Autumn (1964)
12. 1968-11-28: Marco the Magnificent (1965)
13. 1968-12-05: In the Cool of the Day (1963)
14. 1968-12-12: Lisa (1962)
15. 1968-12-19: Guns at Batasi (1964)
16. 1968-12-26: East of Sudan (1964)
17. 1969-01-02: Splendor in the Grass (1961) (Rerun from '67-'68)
18. 1969-01-09: Kisses for My President (1964)
19. 1969-01-16: Man in the Middle (1964)
20. 1969-01-23: Never Too Late (1965)
21. 1969-01-30: Cat on a Hot Tin Roof (Rerun from '67-68)
22. 1969-02-06: Please Don't Eat the Daisies (1960)
23. 1969-02-13: Dead Ringer (1964)
24. 1969-02-20: The Americanization of Emily (1964)
25. 1969-02-27: Sex and the Single Girl (1964) (Rerun)
26. 1969-03-06: Goodbye Charlie (1964) (Rerun)
27. 1969-03-13: The Stripper (1963)
28. 1969-03-20: Paris When It Sizzles (1964)
29. 1969-03-27: The Night of the Iguana (1964) (Rerun)
30. 1969-04-03: Seven Days in May (1964)
31. 1969-04-10: The Chapman Report (1962)
32. 1969-04-17: UMC (1969)
33. 1969-04-24: Act One (1963) (Rerun)
34. 1969-05-01: Madison Avenue (1962)
35. 1969-05-08: The Blue Angel (1959)
36. 1969-05-15: A Distant Trumpet (1964) (Rerun)

Fridays (1968–69):

1. 1968-09-13: Viva Las Vegas (1964) (Rerun from '67-'68)
2. 1968-09-20: (Pre-empted by the network)
3. 1968-09-27: Sex and the Single Girl (1964)
4. 1968-10-04: The Singing Nun (1966)
5. 1968-10-11: A Distant Trumpet (1964)
6. 1968-10-18: Goodbye Charlie (1964)
7. 1968-10-25: Shock Treatment (1964)
8. 1968-11-01: Quick Before It Melts (1964)
9. 1968-11-08: When the Boys Meet the Girls (1965)
10. 1968-11-15: Diamond Head (1962)
11. 1968-11-22: Ensign Pulver (1964)
12. 1968-11-29: North by Northwest (1959) (Rerun from '67-'68)
13. 1968-12-06: The Defector (1966)
14. 1968-12-13: Advance to the Rear (1964)
15. 1968-12-20: A Global Affair (1964)
16. 1968-12-27: The House of the Seven Hawks (1959)
17. 1969-01-03: The Incredible Mr. Limpet (1964)
18. 1969-01-10: Where the Boys Are (1960)
19. 1969-01-17: 4 For Texas (1963)
20. 1969-01-24: Girl Happy (1965)
21. 1969-01-31: Made in Paris (1966)
22. 1969-02-07: Penelope (1966)
23. 1969-02-14: Boys' Night Out (1962)
24. 1969-02-21: Seven Brides for Seven Brothers (1954)
25. 1969-02-28: The Glass Bottom Boat (1965) (Rerun)
26. 1969-03-07: All Hands on Deck (1961)
27. 1969-03-14: Harum Scarum (1965) (Rerun)
28. 1969-03-21: Stalag 17 (1953)
29. 1969-03-28: Pre-empted for a CBS News Special Report
30. 1969-04-04: The Singing Nun (1966) (Rerun)
31. 1969-04-11: Gypsy (1962) (Rerun)
32. 1969-04-18: Escape from Fort Bravo (1953)
33. 1969-04-25: Siege of the Saxons (1963)
34. 1969-05-02: Gigot (1962)
35. 1969-05-09: The Alphabet Murders (1966)
36. 1969-05-16: Tarzan Goes to India (1962)

The 1968-69 TV season finally witnessed a network prime-time movie for each night of the week. As author Robert Beverley Ray neatly summed up, "television had an NBC Monday Night Movie, an NBC Tuesday Night Movie, an ABC Wednesday Night Movie, a CBS Thursday Night Movie, a CBS Friday Night Movie, an NBC Saturday Night Movie, and to complete the week, an ABC Sunday Night Movie." Critic Jack Gould wondered whether a "battle of film-against-film may not be as remote as some in TV had originally thought." And upon the arrival of 1969, another media critic made a hopeful New Year's prediction that "[s]ome network will bravely drop one of those nightly two-hour movie reruns" and replace it with "two half-hour situation-comedies plus a one-hour variety show [whose star is] a very young singer with a Southern accent and a guitar". That forecast proved only half-correct—the singer with the Southern accent and guitar turned out to be Glen Campbell, whose weekly variety show premiered on CBS two weeks into January 1969. Campbell's broadcast, however, replaced neither of the network's movie anthologies.

The beginning of the 1969-70 season saw a brief surge in audience numbers with CBS's two-part world TV premiere of The Guns of Navarone (1961), based on the Alistair MacLean best-seller. Then 14 days later, the comedy Doctor, You've Got to Be Kidding (1966) qualified as the sixth most-watched program of the Nielsen's rating period, while the Glenn Ford thriller Fate is the Hunter (1964) scored at #16 during the same week. And in the season's fifth week, the Gothic thriller Two on a Guillotine and another Glenn Ford picture, The Last Challenge, both wound up in the Top 20. But another trend became evident in CBS's film-anthologies as viewers began to notice a sharp increase of repeat broadcasts. At the same time, there was a corresponding decrease in new films available for showing, and there was a good reason for this. Production of new theatrical films had slackened to a near-standstill in Hollywood and as a result, some studios, among them 20th Century Fox and Paramount, were "waiting to unload their expensive backlog of films" to the networks. Indeed, CBS had completed a deal with Fox a year earlier for exclusive rights to televise some of its most recent films (Rio Conchos and Guns at Batasi, to name two), but the network had been allowing those to merely trickle through to viewers at a rate of 5 or 6 per season. This became CBS's programming strategy with product leased from other studios as well. Consequently, the schedule of films listed below included a greater number of reruns than in previous years.

Thursdays (1969–70):

1. 1969-09-25: The Guns of Navarone (1961), Part 1
2. 1969-10-02: The Sandpiper (1965)
3. 1969-10-09: Fate is the Hunter (1964)
4. 1969-10-16: Inside Daisy Clover (1965)
5. 1969-10-23: Two on a Guillotine (1965)
6. 1969-10-30: Dear Heart (1965)
7. 1969-11-06: 4 for Texas (1963) (Rerun from '68-'69)
8. 1969-11-13: Mister Buddwing (1966)
9. 1969-11-20: The Roman Spring of Mrs. Stone (1962)
10. 1969-11-27: Rio Conchos (1964)
11. 1969-12-04: Ten Little Indians (1965)
12. 1969-12-11: Libel (1959)
13. 1969-12-18: The Americanization of Emily (1964) (Rerun from '68-'69)
14. 1969-12-25: Me and the Colonel (1959)
15. 1970-01-70: All in a Night's Work (1961) (Rerun from '67-'68)
16. 1970-01-08: My Blood Runs Cold (1965)
17. 1970-01-15: Escape from Fort Bravo (1953) (Rerun from '68-'69)
18. 1970-01-22: Never Too Late (1965)
19. 1970-01-29: The Law and Jake Wade (1959)
20. 1970-02-05: The Chapman Report (1962) (Rerun from '68-'69)
21. 1970-02-12: Hatari! (1962), Part 1
22. 1970-02-19: Hud (1963)
23. 1970-02-26: Peyton Place (1957), Part 1
24. 1970-03-05: The African Queen (1952)
25. 1970-03-12: Hunters Are for Killing (1970) (Made-for-TV premiere)
26. 1970-03-19: A New Kind of Love (1963)
27. 1970-03-26: The Power (1968)
28. 1970-04-02: Fate is the Hunter (1964) (Rerun)
29. 1970-04-09: Doctor, You've Got to Be Kidding (1966) (Rerun)
30. 1970-04-16: Where Angels Go, Trouble Follows (1968) (Rerun)
31. 1970-04-23: The Millionairess (1960)
32. 1970-04-30: Operation Amsterdam (1959)
33. 1970-05-07: Three Bites of the Apple (1967)
34. 1970-05-14: Hotel Paradiso (1966)
35. 1970-05-21: Pirates of Tortuga (1961)
36. 1970-05-28: The Innocents (1961)

Fridays (1969–70):

1. 1969-09-26: The Guns of Navarone (1961), Part 2
2. 1969-10-03: Double Trouble (1967)
3. 1969-10-10: Doctor, You've Got to Be Kidding (1966)
4. 1969-10-17: Where Angels Go, Trouble Follows (1968)
5. 1969-10-24: The Last Challenge (1967)
6. 1969-10-31: Come Fly with Me (1963)
7. 1969-11-07: How to Stuff a Wild Bikini (1965)
8. 1969-11-14: Penelope (1966) (Rerun from '68-'69)
9. 1969-11-21: Fanny (1961)
10. 1969-11-28: Please Don't Eat the Daisies (1960) (Rerun from '68-'69)
11. 1969-12-05: Having a Wild Weekend (1965)
12. 1969-12-12: Paris When It Sizzles (1964) (Rerun from '68-'69)
13. 1969-12-19: Seven Brides for Seven Brothers (1954) (Rerun from '68-'69)
14. 1969-12-26: Anna and the King of Siam (1946)
15. 1970-01-02: Girl Happy (1965) (Rerun from '68-'69)
16. 1970-01-09: Sole Survivor (1970) (Made-for-TV premiere)
17. 1970-01-16: Robin and the 7 Hoods (1964)
18. 1970-01-23: Wake Me When It's Over (1960)
19. 1970-01-30: The Venetian Affair (1967)
20. 1970-02-06: Cutter's Trail (1970) (Made-for-TV premiere)
21. 1970-02-13: Hatari! (1962), Part 2
22. 1970-02-20: The Challengers (1970) (Made-for-TV premiere)
23. 1970-02-27: Peyton Place (1957), Part 2
24. 1970-03-06: The Sandpiper (1965) (Rerun)
25. 1970-03-13: Two on a Guillotine (1965) (Rerun)
26. 1970-03-20: Rio Conchos (1964) (Rerun)
27. 1970-03-27: Where the Boys Are (1960) (Rerun from '68-'69)
28. 1970-04-03: (Pre-empted by the network)
29. 1970-04-10: Advance to the Rear (1964) (Rerun from '68-'69)
30. 1970-04-17: The Third Day (1965)
31. 1970-04-24: The Angel Wore Red (1960)
32. 1970-05-01: Tarzan and the Valley of Gold (1966)
33. 1970-05-08: The Crooked Road (1964)
34. 1970-05-15: Come Fly with Me (1963) (Rerun)
35. 1970-05-22: Hold On! (1966)
36. 1970-05-29: The Visit (1964)

Upon the arrival of the summer months, many of the above titles were re-broadcast. However, there was also a smattering of premieres on CBS throughout this period. Island in the Sun (1957), based on Alec Waugh's best-selling post-WWII novel about interracial tensions on a Caribbean island, was shown for the first time the evening of June 11, 1970. And on August 14, there was the TV debut of Nine Hours to Rama (1963), starring Horst Buchholz as the Hindu extremist who assassinated Gandhi. Moreover, to fill out its summer movie fare, the network followed through on a surprise April announcement that it would add yet a third movie anthology on Tuesday nights (7:30-9:30 pm, ET). It featured a combination of reruns plus some novel offerings, like the 1962 fantasy Five Weeks in a Balloon, with Barbara Eden (on June 30); a 1968 doomsday thriller Panic in the City, featuring Howard Duff (on July 7); and the 1965 remake of the classic She, starring Ursula Andress (July 21). For film fans, however, this third movie-night proved to be only a summer fling, for at the beginning of the 1970-71 season, CBS cancelled its Tuesday anthology to make room for its customary sitcom fodder with new episodes of The Beverly Hillbillies and Green Acres.

== The 1970–71 season: The rise of the made-for-TV movie ==
With the scheduling of more recent films from Hollywood, the three major networks were faced with the question of how best to present increasingly risque material without offending the mainstream tastes of their audiences. Up until 1970, censors would simply bleep salty dialogue or edit shots, trusting that such excisions would not detract from a film's storyline. In some cases, however, it became necessary to remove so much of a film that additional scenes had to be written and produced by a network and then inserted into the movie so that its telecast not only filled a 2-hour time slot but also made sense to viewers. NBC, for example, had contracted with Universal to run the R-rated Three into Two Won't Go (1969) during the fall of 1970. Questionable scenes from this British-made thriller were either severely chopped or eliminated and replaced with 17 minutes of new footage produced in a Hollywood studio and featuring actors who had not appeared in the original conception. As a result of such practices, the networks were "beginning to smart under the criticisms of their cutting and re-shaping" of additional films such as Secret Ceremony (1968) and The Night of the Following Day (1968). This was a consequence of the displacement impact of broadcast television. Motion picture studios, having withstood the long decline of theater-attendance by families (who presumably preferred to stay home and watch TV), had increasingly re-crafted their product during the 1960s to appeal to a smaller, more mature (adult) audience in both theme and presentation. Consequently, some films became essentially impossible to re-cut or revise into family broadcast-ready entertainment. Recognizing this, NBC soon abandoned these attempts at the bowdlerization and/or alteration of a theatrical film's content. But at the same time, it became apparent to all three networks that if some movies could not be successfully repackaged for family viewing, then perhaps a stronger emphasis should be focused on producing more films specifically for television. As a result, this hybrid genre began to exert a larger presence on American home screens.

The origin of the American network TV-movie had actually occurred years earlier, when NBC had entered into an agreement with Universal wherein the studio produce films approximately 98 minutes long to be broadcast initially on the network. Universal, however, retained the distribution rights to re-release these productions in overseas theatre and television markets. Moreover, NBC agreed to pay "from 30 to 65 percent of the production costs" in return for U.S. theatrical and syndication rights as well as "the right to show the films first." This pact resulted in such successful TV-films as the disaster movie The Doomsday Flight (1966) starring Jack Lord; The Borgia Stick (1967), an industrial spy drama with Don Murray and Inger Stevens; and Prescription: Murder (1968), the original manifestation of Peter Falk's police detective/character, Lt. Columbo. NBC thus remained the acknowledged pioneer in TV-movies until 1969, when the ABC network produced and premiered its new weekly series of made-for-TV films, The ABC Movie of the Week. Some of these features were so popular that they were later released to theaters in America and Europe for further exhibition, among them Joseph Sargent's Tribes (1970), Buzz Kulik's Brian's Song (1971) and Steven Spielberg's Duel (1971). As a result, ABC planned a second anthology of new offerings under the title, Movie of the Weekend.

By contrast with its competitors, CBS had contributed a scant number of made-for-TV feature-length films; and what little they had scheduled were mostly produced in association with independent companies like QM Productions, or CBS-owned Cinema Center Films, through its television film unit, Cinema Center 100. However, four years earlier, CBS had entered into an agreement with Universal to contribute $340,000 to the studio's million-dollar budgeted remake of the classic western The Plainsman (1966). In return, CBS was granted the right to exclusively premiere the film as a Thursday Night Movie telecast. However, once production was completed and The Plainsman was screened for Universal's top brass, they concluded they had a hit movie on their hands. Thus, the studio re-negotiated with CBS to drop its commitment to run the film first so that Universal could instead open The Plainsman in theaters. The network agreed, but only on condition Universal promise in return "to give [CBS] an existing feature film from their backlog." (That replacement feature turned out to be the 1950 fantasy Harvey, starring James Stewart.) Nevertheless, CBS vice-president Michael Dann, a fan of the TV-movie innovation, predicted two months afterward that in the near-future "the studios will be making 50 to 75 such pictures a year." The 1970-71 season would prove him correct. And when the Thursday Night Movie opened its fall schedule with the premiere of a low-budget, made-for-TV movie, rather than a proven Hollywood blockbuster guaranteed to lure mass viewership, it became CBS's way of declaring its commitment to product that, although cheaply manufactured, was nevertheless new and topical. In this case, the movie was The Brotherhood of the Bell, and the film's star was Glenn Ford, a movie actor who had never appeared in a television-film. In fact, before shooting on the project even began, Ford had been warned by friends in the industry that he would hate the experience. Instead, the actor reported that "it was five of the most enjoyable weeks I've ever spent working...it was a good solid script with people like Maurice Evans and Dean Jagger working with me." The film received respectable notices from the critics, and its reputation has grown ever since. In 1986, for example, critic David Deal would label Brotherhood "one of the very best television movies of the era...a first-rate production." And in recent years, it has acquired the reputation of a conspiracy-theory cult classic. As a result of the film's success, the new season would witness CBS's determination to increase its output of works produced directly for television—especially during late February to early April 1971, when 5 out of 11 features shown were made-for-TV world premieres.

Thursdays (1970–71):

1. 1970-09-17: The Brotherhood of the Bell (1970) (Made-for-TV premiere)
2. 1970-09-24: The Dirty Dozen (1967)
3. 1970-10-01: BUtterfield 8 (1960)
4. 1970-10-08: The Great Race (1965), Part 1
5. 1970-10-15: Robin and the 7 Hoods (1964) (Rerun from '69-70)
6. 1970-10-22: The Biggest Bundle of Them All (1968)
7. 1970-10-29: Heaven with a Gun (1969)
8. 1970-11-05: The Shuttered Room (1967)
9. 1970-11-12: This Property Is Condemned (1966)
10. 1970-11-19: A Place in the Sun (1951)
11. 1970-11-26: Oklahoma! (1955)
12. 1970-12-03: Peyton Place (1957), Part 1. (Rerun from '69-70)
13. 1970-12-10: Chuka (1967)
14. 1970-12-17: Where Angels Go, Trouble Follows (1968) (Rerun from '69-70)
15. 1970-12-24: The Password Is Courage (1962)
16. 1970-12-31: Chamber of Horrors (1966)
17. 1971-01-07: The Bridge on the River Kwai (1957), Part 1
18. 1971-01-14: Five Branded Women (1960) (Rerun from '66-67)
19. 1971-01-21: The African Queen (1951) (Rerun from '69-70)
20. 1971-01-28: Return to Peyton Place (1961)
21. 1971-02-04: The Power (1968) (Rerun from '69-70)
22. 1971-02-11: The Cincinnati Kid (1966) (Rerun)
23. 1971-02-18: Battle of the Bulge (1965), Part 1
24. 1971-02-25: Not with My Wife, You Don't! (1966) (Rerun)
25. 1971-03-04: None but the Brave (1965) (Rerun)
26. 1971-03-11: Travis Logan, D.A. (1971) (Made-for-TV premiere)
27. 1971-03-18: The Shuttered Room (1967) (Rerun)
28. 1971-03-25: Casino Royale (1967) (Rerun)
29. 1971-04-01: Brainstorm (1965)
30. 1971-04-08: Who's Minding the Store? (1963)
31. 1971-04-15: Kid Rodelo (1966)
32. 1971-04-22: Term of Trial (1963)
33. 1971-04-29: Judith (1966)
34. 1971-05-06: The Battle of the Villa Fiorita (1965)
35. 1971-05-13: A Covenant with Death (1967)
36. 1971-05-20: Chamber of Horrors (1966) (Rerun)

Fridays (1970–71):

1. 1970-09-18: Casino Royale (1967)
2. 1970-09-25: The Cincinnati Kid (1966)
3. 1970-10-02: None but the Brave (1965)
4. 1970-10-09: The Great Race (1965), Part 2
5. 1970-10-16: Stay Away, Joe (1968)
6. 1970-10-23: Not with My Wife, You Don't! (1966)
7. 1970-10-30: Warning Shot (1967)
8. 1970-11-06: One-Eyed Jacks (1961) (Rerun from '66-'67)
9. 1970-11-13: The Guns of Navarone (1961) (Rerun from '69-70)
10. 1970-11-20: Night Chase (1970) (Made-for-TV premiere)
11. 1970-11-27: The Last Challenge (1967) (Rerun from '69-'70)
12. 1970-12-04: Peyton Place (1957), Part 2. (Rerun from '69-70)
13. 1970-12-11: Easy Come, Easy Go (1967)
14. 1970-12-18: Once a Thief (1965)
15. 1970-12-25: Life With Father (1947)
16. 1971-01-01: Tarzan's Three Challenges (1963)
17. 1971-01-08: The Bridge on the River Kwai (1957), Part 2
18. 1971-01-15: Marriage on the Rocks (1965)
19. 1971-01-22: She (1965) (Rerun from '69-70)
20. 1971-01-29: The Rounders (1965)
21. 1971-02-05: First to Fight (1967)
22. 1971-02-12: The Rat Race (1960) (Rerun from '66-67)
23. 1971-02-19: Battle of the Bulge (1965), Part 2
24. 1971-02-26: A Step Out of Line (1971) (Made-for-TV premiere)
25. 1971-03-05: The Biggest Bundle of Them All (1968) (Rerun)
26. 1971-03-12: Harpy (1971) (Made-for-TV premiere)
27. 1971-03-19: This Property Is Condemned (1966) (Rerun)
28. 1971-03-26: Cannon (1971) (Made-for-TV premiere)
29. 1971-04-02: O'Hara, U.S. Treasury (1971) (Made-for-TV premiere).
30. 1971-04-09: Tarzan and the Great River (1967)
31. 1971-04-16: Powderkeg (1971) (Made-for-TV premiere)
32. 1971-04-23: Sons and Lovers (1960)
33. 1971-04-30: Jack of Diamonds (1967)
34. 1971-05-07: The Disorderly Orderly (1964)
35. 1971-05-14: Tarzan's Three Challenges (1963) (Rerun)
36. 1971-05-21: The Cool Ones (1967)

The above schedule was augmented by the Wednesday, November 25, 1970 TV premiere of The Unsinkable Molly Brown, starring Debbie Reynolds. And on February 14, 1971, there was a special Sunday-night world TV premiere of the film Ben-Hur (1959), featuring Charlton Heston and Stephen Boyd. This Academy Award winner for Best Picture was five hours long when aired with commercial interruptions, running from 7 pm to midnight (ET). In addition, just as the network had done during the previous year, CBS premiered a handful of movies throughout its summer schedule. Among those were included: The Violent Ones (1967; shown June 3), Night Must Fall (1964; debuting June 10), The Wrong Box (1966; premiering Sunday, June 20), The Frozen Dead (1967; June 24), Doctor Faustus (1968; June 25), The Money Jungle (1968; July 1), and An American Dream (1966; July 2).

== The 1971–72 season: Thursdays and Sundays ==
Throughout the summer of 1971, CBS prepared its own weekly series of TV-movies for the new fall season. It was dubbed The New CBS Friday Night Movies. but one network representative advertised it as "nothing more than an old-fashioned suspense anthology series," much like the old U.S. Steel Hour or Playhouse 90—only "tricked out with film," as opposed to live studio broadcasts, the norm for presentation during the early 1950s. This new project was originally envisioned by producer Philip Barry, Jr. (son of the playwright Philip Barry) to exclusively consist of "all-suspense of various sorts." Barry further promised viewers that the new anthology would avoid "doing any law enforcement shows, no doctors, no lawyers, none of the usual things." Thus, the New CBS Friday Night Movie began its run in September 1971, occupying the 9:30–11:00 time slot (Eastern Time). It was not to be a successful outing, chiefly because it was scheduled opposite NBC's own World Premiere series, which began one hour earlier.

In order to accommodate its new suspense anthology, CBS shuffled its Sunday night line-up to make room for its alternative presentation-format for old movies. Thus what had been known for the past 5 years as the CBS Friday Night Movie became the CBS Sunday Night Movie, airing from 7:30 to 9:30 pm (Eastern Time). This was a highly publicized programming change because it necessitated the cancellation of CBS's signature variety series, the long-running Ed Sullivan Show. After 23 successful years, this icon of the airwaves was ordered to vacate the premises and beginning in September, the CBS Sunday Night Movie launched its 1971-72 season with the TV premiere of the Spencer Tracy-Katharine Hepburn 1967 comedy-drama, Guess Who's Coming to Dinner. But this would be remembered as the year the holiday classic The Homecoming: A Christmas Story (1971), a TV film starring Patricia Neal, was first aired. Critics lavished unqualified praise, including one writer who labeled it "a lovely pre-holiday program—sweet but never cloying and sparked with humor." Not only was this production repeated each year at Yuletide throughout the decade, but it also served as the genesis for the long-running family-drama series The Waltons.

Thursdays (1971–72):

1. 1971-09-16: Harper (1965)
2. 1971-09-23: The Ambushers (1967)
3. 1971-09-30: How to Save a Marriage and Ruin Your Life (1968)
4. 1971-10-07: BUtterfield 8 (1960) (Rerun from '70-71)
5. 1971-10-14: The Dirty Dozen (1967)
6. 1971-10-21: Pre-empted by CBS Reports
7. 1971-10-28: The Comedians (1967)
8. 1971-11-04: Berserk! (1968)
9. 1971-11-11: Don't Make Waves (1967)
10. 1971-11-18: Pendulum (1968)
11. 1971-11-25: Pre-empted by CBS Reports
12. 1971-12-02: The Impossible Years (1968)
13. 1971-12-09: The Comic (1969)
14. 1971-12-16: Arrivederci, Baby! (1966)
15. 1971-12-23: Pre-empted by CBS Reports
16. 1971-12-30: Pre-empted by CBS Reports
17. 1972-01-06: Heaven with a Gun (1969) (Rerun from '70-71)
18. 1972-01-13: The Liquidator (1965)
19. 1972-01-20: Chuka (1967) (Rerun from '70-71)
20. 1972-01-27: Pre-empted by CBS Reports
21. 1972-02-03: Hunters are for Killing (1970) (Rerun from '69-70)
22. 1972-02-10: A Streetcar Named Desire (1951)
23. 1972-02-17: My Blood Runs Cold (1965) (Rerun from '69-70)
24. 1972-02-24: Bandolero! (1968) (Rerun)
25. 1972-03-02: Harper (1966) (Rerun)
26. 1972-03-09: Pre-empted by CBS Reports
27. 1972-03-16: Return to Peyton Place (1961) (Rerun from '70-71)
28. 1972-03-23: Promise Her Anything (1966)
29. 1972-03-30: Berserk! (1968) (Rerun)
30. 1972-04-06: The Impossible Years (1968) (Rerun)
31. 1972-04-13: Pendulum (1968) (Rerun)
32. 1972-04-20: Interlude (1968)
33. 1972-04-27: Kona Coast (1968)
34. 1972-05-04: Apache Uprising (1968)
35. 1972-05-11: Pre-empted for a CBS sports special
36. 1972-05-18: Duffy (1968)
37. 1972-05-25: The Bobo (1967)

Sundays (1971–72):

1. 1971-09-19: Guess Who's Coming to Dinner (1967)
2. 1971-09-26: Bandolero! (1968)
3. 1971-10-03: To Sir, with Love (1967)
4. 1971-10-10: The Sand Pebbles (1965) Part 1
5. 1971-10-17: The Sand Pebbles (1965) Part 2
6. 1971-10-24: Battle of the Bulge (1965) Part 1 (Rerun from '70-71)
7. 1971-10-31: Battle of the Bulge (1965) Part 2 (Rerun from '70-71)
8. 1971-11-07: Marriage on the Rocks (1965) (Rerun from '70-71)
9. 1971-11-14: Anzio (1968)
10. 1971-11-21: Born Free (1966)
11. 1971-11-28: The Great Race (1965) Part 1
12. 1971-12-05: The Great Race (1965) Part 2
13. 1971-12-12: Will Penny (1967)
14. 1971-12-19: The Homecoming: A Christmas Story (Made-for-TV premiere, 1971)
15. 1971-12-26: D-Day the Sixth of June (1956)
16. 1972-01-02: Up the Down Staircase (1967)
17. 1972-01-09: Stay Away, Joe (1968) (Rerun from '70-'71)
18. 1972-01-16: The Bridge on the River Kwai (1957) Part 1 (Rerun from '70-71)
19. 1972-01-23: The Bridge on the River Kwai (1957) Part 2 (Rerun from '70-71)
20. 1972-01-30: Welcome Home, Johnny Bristol (1972) (Made-for-TV premiere)
21. 1972-02-06: The Brotherhood of the Bell (1970) (Rerun from '70-71)
22. 1972-02-13: Ben-Hur (1959) Part One (Rerun from '70-71)
23. 1972-02-20: Ben-Hur (1959) Part Two (Rerun from '70-71)
24. 1972-02-27: Anzio (1968) (Rerun)
25. 1972-03-05: A Fine Madness (1966)
26. 1972-03-12: Five Million Years to Earth (1968)
27. 1972-03-19: Easy Come, Easy Go (1967) (Rerun from '70-71)
28. 1972-03-26: Pre-empted by a CBS entertainment special
29. 1972-04-02: The Shoes of the Fisherman (1969)
30. 1972-04-09: Don't Raise the Bridge, Lower the River (1968)
31. 1972-04-16: Tarzan and the Jungle Boy (1968)
32. 1972-04-23: Funeral in Berlin (1967)
33. 1972-04-30: Up the Down Staircase (1967) (Rerun)
34. 1972-05-07: Enter Laughing (1967)
35. 1972-05-14: The Firechasers (1971)
36. 1972-05-21: Gentle Giant (1967)
37. 1972-05-28: A Dandy in Aspic (1968)

Summer premieres included the Vince Edwards crime drama Hammerhead (1968), airing on June 15; the spy melodrama Assignment K (1968), on June 22, with Stephen Boyd and Camilla Sparv; and the surreal comedy The Tiger Makes Out (1967), on June 29, featuring the husband-and-wife team, Eli Wallach and Anne Jackson. There was also the TV debut of the Danny Kaye military comedy On the Double (1961) on June 8, which included a bawdy sequence in a wartime Berlin cabaret where the comedian/hero, in drag, impersonates Marlene Dietrich singing "Cocktails for Zwei" and is later "seduced" in a dressing room by a drunken Luftwaffe officer. In earlier years, these scenes would have been considered too racy for prime-time audiences, what with their satire of transvestism and gay sex. As it happened, however, CBS had broadcast another film with similar scenes, albeit in a more serious framework, less than four months prior—Luchino Visconti's The Damned (1969), originally rated X when it first opened in theaters. Obviously, the film had to "undergo some severe editing to conform" with a TV audience's acceptance and the resulting presentation, which was pre-screened for affiliates via closed-circuit, was so incoherent that many stations refused to run it.

The Damned was never intended for prime-time airing. Instead, it was among the initial presentations by CBS for television's first late-night network film anthology, for on the evening of Valentine's Day 1972, the network mailed a love-letter to America's film fans when it broke with network late-night tradition by cancelling its Merv Griffin talk-show to make way for The CBS Late Movie. In so doing, the organization that years earlier had spurned the scheduling of old movies as "uncreative" was suddenly running a total of 7 feature-films each week. The axing of the Griffin show was of little consequence when one considers that his program was being broadcast on only 129 affiliates, whereas the CBS Late Movie debuted on 179. It was also a wise business decision when taking into account that the network was paying, on average, only $30,000-40,000 for each of the 220 movies leased from Warner Brothers and MGM. At such cheap rates, CBS was clearing $100,000 per late-night broadcast.

Meanwhile, in prime time, the CBS Sunday Night Movie appeared to be holding its own in terms of audience shares, especially during the first half of October when it was rated the third most-watched network telecast. Unfortunately, those numbers did not hold up; and with ratings for the New CBS Friday Night Movie also sagging, it was decided the upcoming season to return the Sunday Night Movie to its original Friday night time slot and to transfer the Friday made-for-TV movie anthology to Tuesdays. However, one trend introduced late in 1971—the sporadic pre-emption of CBS's Thursday films for news specials—would continue into the next season. This was largely due to the fact that 1972 was not only an election year, but it was also a time when an American president made important overseas state visits to both China and the Soviet Union. It is during such events that information programming enjoys its most receptive audience. And in the next season, with the Watergate scandal gathering steam despite President Nixon's landslide re-election, television documentaries and network panel discussions would draw better-than-usual ratings. Thus, news specials would continue to pinch-hit for the Thursday Night Movie on select occasions.

== The 1972–73 season: Return to Thursdays and Fridays ==
In the fall of 1972, the issue dominating most discussions on matters related to TV and radio involved on-air obscenities. It even preoccupied lawmakers in Congress, where Sen. John Pastore (D-Rhode Island), chairman of the Commerce Committee, led an investigation into alleged broadcast profanity. He later told one reporter, "Frankly, there have been some things that have shocked me. There have been four-letter words used on radio. Of course, they haven't gone that far on television...the networks have bleeped them out." Apparently the senator overlooked network film-telecasts, for it was the potty-mouth controversy that cost the CBS Thursday Night Movie half its audience. It occurred on an evening in mid-November when roughly 100 affiliates refused to air the true-crime film In Cold Blood (1967) "on the grounds of explicit content"—specifically, the uncensored use of the word "frigging" by one of its two lead characters. ABC, however, experienced viewer wrath of a different kind when John Wayne's most famous line of dialogue ever, was altered by network censors. This is how Chicago news columnist Mike Royko illustrated the situation:

The other day, True Grit came to television. The big scene developed. Ned Pepper issued his insult. John Wayne looked furious. Then Wayne uttered his famous line. He said: "Fill your hands, you." That's all. The rest of it, the important SOB, had been snipped or blurred from the sound track...What kind of line is "Fill your hands, you?".

What perplexed viewers about ABC's censorship was that a week later, the same network would show the movie Patton (1970), leaving George C. Scott's swear words intact—a move that may have emboldened CBS to retain the double entendres and much of the blue language in Who's Afraid of Virginia Woolf? (1966), which starred Elizabeth Taylor and Richard Burton. The New York Times critic Howard Thompson praised the telecast, especially the manner in which the network's commercial breaks were carefully placed so as not to detract from the power of Edward Albee's drama. As for the questionable dialogue, Thompson noted that every 'hell' and 'damn' prevailed. He added, "Sharp ears may have caught an early 'goddamn' from Miss Taylor [and] she bellowed the same word later...an agonized shriek underscoring the despair of a drama that by then had many viewers riveted to their chairs." In fact, CBS slated the film for broadcast during the all-important sweeps month of February 1973. However, the strategy backfired; the film finished at #38 for the week it was shown. This prompted columnist Rick DuBrow to call out TV executives who persisted in programming a "comfortably predictable list of motion pictures and determine by title and category how they will do in the ratings game." In other words, an Oscar-winning movie that features a hot tabloid item like Liz and Dick exchanging curse-laden insults will not always guarantee a huge TV audience—and unfortunately for the network, it didn't.

But if CBS's roster of theatrical features failed to match programming expectations, its Tuesday night made-for-TV product was a disaster. As writer Norman Mark noted, "CBS has flopped with almost all of its [new] films this season, an unequaled record." One exception, however, was the much-touted A War of Children, starring Jenny Agutter as an Irish-Catholic girl in war-torn Belfast who falls in love with a British/Protestant soldier. According to The New York Times critic John J. O'Connor, the film "got off to a fine start and came to a convincingly moving end. It was somewhere around the middle that the drama failed [and became] almost fatally vague." But CBS's Thursday-night world premiere of Gay Talese's Honor Thy Father in March 1973 received rave notices, including one that bestowed high praise on the film's star Joseph Bologna for "a highly fascinating portrayal" of Salvatore Bonanno, heir to legendary crime boss Joe Bonanno. These works, however, were the only two high points of a disappointing season.

Thursdays (1972–73):

1. 1972-09-14: Around the World in 80 Days (1956), Part 1
2. 1972-09-21: The Professionals (1966)
3. 1972-09-28: Mackenna's Gold (1968)
4. 1972-10-05: The Undefeated (1969)
5. 1972-10-12: Marlowe (1969)
6. 1972-10-19: The Legend of Lylah Clare (1969)
7. 1972-10-26: Guess Who's Coming to Dinner (1969) (Rerun from '71-72)
8. 1972-11-02: The Dirty Dozen, Part 1 (1967) (Rerun from '71-72)
9. 1972-11-09: Wait Until Dark (1967)
10. 1972-11-16: In Cold Blood (1967)
11. 1972-11-23: Chitty Chitty Bang Bang (1968)
12. 1972-11-30: Bandolero! (1968) (Rerun from '71-72)
13. 1972-12-07: The African Queen (1951) (Rerun from '69-70)
14. 1972-12-14: How to Murder Your Wife (1965)
15. 1972-12-21: Will Penny (1967)
16. 1972-12-28: Pre-empted for CBS special presentations
17. 1973-01-04: The Sand Pebbles (1965), Part 1 (Rerun from '71-72)
18. 1973-01-11: The Gypsy Moths (1969)
19. 1973-01-18: Vertigo (1958)
20. 1973-01-25: The Hallelujah Trail (1965)
21. 1973-02-01: Pre-empted for CBS Specials
22. 1973-02-08: The Professionals (1966) (Rerun)
23. 1973-02-15: Valley of the Dolls (1967) (Rerun)
24. 1973-02-22: Who's Afraid of Virginia Woolf? (1966)
25. 1973-03-01: Honor Thy Father (1973) (Made-for-TV premiere)
26. 1973-03-08: The Marcus-Nelson Murders (1973) (Made-for-TV premiere)
27. 1973-03-15: Pre-empted by a CBS Special Presentation
28. 1973-03-22: Hornets' Nest (1970) (Rerun)
29. 1973-03-29: ...tick...tick...tick... (1970) (Rerun)
30. 1973-04-05: Don't Make Waves (1967) (Rerun from '71-72)
31. 1973-04-12: How to Save a Marriage and Ruin Your Life (1968) (Rerun from '71-72)
32. 1973-04-19: Pre-empted by CBS Special Presentations
33. 1973-04-26: Pre-empted by CBS news specials
34. 1973-05-03: Hot Millions (1968)
35. 1973-05-10: The Moon Is Blue (1953)
36. 1973-05-17: Countdown (1968)
37. 1973-05-24: Blow Up (1967)
38. 1973-05-31: Pre-empted for CBS news specials

Fridays (1972–73):

1. 1972-09-15: Around the World in 80 Days (1956), Part 2
2. 1972-09-22: Valley of the Dolls (1967)
3. 1972-09-29: ...tick...tick...tick... (1970)
4. 1972-10-06: To Sir, with Love (1967)
5. 1972-10-13: They Call Me Mister Tibbs! (1970)
6. 1972-10-20: Pre-empted by CBS news specials
7. 1972-10-27: The McKenzie Break (1970)
8. 1972-11-03: The Dirty Dozen, Part 2 (1967) (Rerun from '71-72)
9. 1972-11-10: Hornets' Nest (1970)
10. 1972-11-17: McLintock! (1963) (Rerun from '67-68)
11. 1972-11-24: Live a Little, Love a Little (1968)
12. 1972-12-01: The Chairman (1969)
13. 1972-12-08: The Homecoming: A Christmas Story (1971) (Rerun from '71-72)
14. 1972-12-15: The Ambushers (1967) (Rerun from '71-72)
15. 1972-12-22: Goodbye, Mr. Chips (1969)
16. 1972-12-29: Hook, Line & Sinker (1969)
17. 1973-01-05: The Sand Pebbles (1965), Part 2 (Rerun from '71-72)
18. 1973-01-12: Petulia (1968)
19. 1973-01-19: The Man Who Knew Too Much (1956)
20. 1973-01-26: The Unsinkable Molly Brown (1963) (Rerun from '70-71)
21. 1973-02-02: Pre-empted for a CBS Special Presentation
22. 1973-02-09: The Undefeated (1969) (Rerun)
23. 1973-02-16: They Call Me Mister Tibbs! (1970) (Rerun)
24. 1973-02-23: Wait Until Dark (1967)
25. 1973-03-02: Mckenna's Gold (1968) (Rerun)
26. 1973-03-09: The Cincinnati Kid (Rerun from '71-72)
27. 1973-03-16: Pre-empted by CBS Special Presentation
28. 1973-03-23: Tom Sawyer (1973) (Made-for-TV premiere)
29. 1973-03-30: Marlowe (1969) (Rerun)
30. 1973-04-06: Southern Star (1969)
31. 1973-04-13: The Man Who Died Twice (1973) (Made-for-TV premiere)
32. 1973-04-20: Oklahoma! (1955) (Rerun from '70-71)
33. 1973-04-27: Hook, Line & Sinker (1969) (Rerun)
34. 1973-05-04: Chubasco (1968)
35. 1973-05-11: The Trouble with Girls (1969)
36. 1973-05-18: The Sergeant (1969)
37. 1973-05-25: Hunter (1973)
38. 1973-06-01: The Maltese Bippy (1969)/A Walk with Love and Death (1969)

There was also the animated Beatles film, Yellow Submarine (1968), which debuted as a special Sunday-evening presentation on October 29, 1972. Additionally, CBS had scheduled the rock-festival documentary Woodstock (1970) for late April 1973, but then reversed course due to nervousness over "what it regard[ed] as raciness in the film." As a result, it would not be televised until several years later by another network, NBC. But the Thursday (and Friday) Night Movie did manage intermittent summer premieres, including The Last of the Secret Agents? (1969), featuring the comedy team of Allen and Rossi, on June 7, plus Secret World (1969), starring Jacqueline Bisset, a week later. Also, there was the debut of the Merchant-Ivory production The Guru (1969), with Rita Tushingham and Michael York, on June 22, as well as the July 19th TV premiere of the Michael Caine film, Deadfall (1968). CBS wrapped up its summer season of first-time showings on September 7 with the telecast of The Vatican Affair (1968), starring Walter Pidgeon and Klaus Kinski.

== The 1973–74 and '74–75 seasons: Violence, movies, and censorship ==
In an October 1973 address to the Better Business Bureau in Nashville, CBS president Robert D. Wood discussed "the changing tastes and standards of society and the growing maturity" of television audiences that influenced his network's decision to air such controversial films as In Cold Blood and Who's Afraid of Virginia Woolf. Wood confirmed that he had deliberately taken "certain calculated risks." However, he felt those gambles were justified. Later, as if to echo Wood's sentiment, NBC president Herbert S. Schlosser stated that "television will never lead any parade of permissiveness. But it should [never] be chained to the past by a few hundred letters of complaint." Yet to critic John J. O'Connor, the entire issue was irrelevant. He felt that "despite the injection of 'contemporary' and 'mature' situations, the mix of regular prime-time TV is no less banal or blatantly manipulative than it ever was." However, another critic, Ron Power of the Chicago Sun-Times, cited a new troubling trend in network programming—violence and sadism. Adopting a highly alarmist stance, Power published what was, in essence, an angry manifesto blasting the networks:

A guy falls out of a high-rise building, his arms flail and his necktie flaps...and you know that in the next second he is going to be an ex-human being—a horribly broken spill of bones and blood. A race car spins, crashes, and bursts into flame, and you know the driver felt the skin being fried away from his body...An airplane explodes in mid-flight; a yacht is ripped apart in a harbor. Something has happened to the people inside...something sudden and cruel and dreadful and final. To the sensitive observer, the reaction is of depression and loss. To the insensitive, there is the strengthening of a condition that human life is cheap. And all the above incidents happened in a single episode of the CBS action-drama Hawaii Five-O.

Power called for "organized reform" by both the media as well as those who viewed their product and patronized their sponsors—and his was not a lone voice. TV/movie director Buzz Kulik stated: "I don't care what anyone says. I think there's a connection between television violence and real violence. You just can't differentiate between the real and the unreal." That connection between the reality of violence and the illusion of fictional mayhem on TV reverberated in news headlines throughout the fall of 1973. For example, there were a number of reports about youth gangs pouring gasoline on helpless victims and setting them aflame. These incidents occurred in various parts of the country. In one instance, a young Boston woman was forced by 6 youths to "douse herself with two gallons of gasoline" before they "then set her afire." In the South, "four teenagers set fire to a sleeping derelict" in Miami. Even an interracial couple in Fort Lauderdale suffered the same cruel fate. Furthermore, it was pointed out that these attacks occurred almost immediately after "a television showing of the movie Fuzz (1972) which depicted similar violence"—specifically, a scene in which one of the characters is doused with a flammable fluid and then ignited. Thus, as in the year before, the stage was set for more debates centering on the issue of censorship and network film telecasts.

Amid such controversy, CBS ordered its film cutters to work. The Thursday Night Movie's slate for the 1973-74 season included two of the most violent films of the Sixties—Arthur Penn's Bonnie and Clyde (1967) and Sam Peckinpah's The Wild Bunch (1969). Both of these works had been championed by critics as masterpieces that used violence to make valid artistic statements about the American contemporary scene. In spite of this, however, the two movies underwent radical cutting. But according to some in the audience, the network went too far, especially with the Peckinpah film. One viewer complained that "when the censors at CBS snipped, they snipped without thinking, blindly...CBS did not show The Wild Bunch at all. Instead they showed some mutilated mess that once had been a masterful original." Another viewer protested that the network's broadcast of the controversial western "amounted to little more than showing snippets, rather like coming attraction footage...I have never seen any film so extensively cut." For CBS, therefore, the new fall season of 1973 got off to a very rocky start.

But ultimately it was also a successful one. Screenings of the first two Planet of the Apes films shot CBS to the top of the charts during that same period. And with Steve McQueen's box-office smash, Bullitt (1968), as well as Dustin Hoffman's breakthrough performance as The Graduate (1967) and the Clint Eastwood action-adventure Kelly's Heroes (1970) leading a pack of hit premieres, it was one of the Thursday Night Movie's most robust seasons. It was also a good year for the network's made-for-TV films, largely due to the January 31, 1974 premiere of The Autobiography of Miss Jane Pittman, which was greeted with near-unanimous praise by critics like Jay Sharbutt, who called the work "profoundly moving...it's the only description that seems to fit this production." And Pauline Kael of The New Yorker, who devoted her entire weekly column to the film, praised John Korty's understated direction as well as Cicely Tyson's performance, for which she would win the Emmy Award for Best Actress in a Special Program.

Thursdays (1973–74):

1. 1973-09-13: The Hot Rock (1972)
2. 1973-09-20: Bonnie and Clyde (1967)
3. 1973-09-27: Kelly's Heroes, Part 1 (1970)
4. 1973-10-04: The Wild Bunch (1969)
5. 1973-10-11: Pre-empted for CBS Special Presentations
6. 1973-10-18: Joy in the Morning (1965)
7. 1973-10-25: Guess Who's Coming to Dinner (1967) (Rerun from '71-72)
8. 1973-11-01: Bullitt (1968)
9. 1973-11-08: The Graduate (1967)
10. 1973-11-15: Pre-empted by CBS Special Presentations
11. 1973-11-22: Duel at Diablo (1966)
12. 1973-11-29: Pre-empted for CBS Specials
13. 1973-12-06: Pre-empted by CBS specials
14. 1973-12-13: The Last Escape (1970)
15. 1973-12-20: Gunfight at the OK Corral (1957)
16. 1973-12-27: Oklahoma! (1955) (Rerun from '70-71)
17. 1974-01-03: Don't Drink the Water (1969)
18. 1974-01-10: Pre-empted for CBS Specials
19. 1974-01-17: The Horror at 37,000 Feet (1973) (Rerun)
20. 1974-01-24: Valley of the Dolls (1966) (Rerun from '72-73)
21. 1974-01-31: The Autobiography of Miss Jane Pittman (1974) (Made-for-TV premiere)
22. 1974-02-07: Kansas City Bomber (1972)
23. 1974-02-14: Ryan's Daughter (1970)
24. 1974-02-21: Wild Rovers (1971)
25. 1974-02-28: Hello, Dolly! (1969)
26. 1974-03-07: Marriage Times Four (1974)
27. 1974-03-14: Birds of Prey (1973)
28. 1974-03-21: Sidekicks (1974)
29. 1974-03-28: Pre-empted for CBS Special Presentations
30. 1974-04-04: Dr. Max (1974) (Made-for-TV premiere)
31. 1974-04-11: The Cable Car Murder (1971)
32. 1974-04-18: Pre-empted for a CBS Sports Special
33. 1974-04-25: The Last Escape (1970) (Rerun)
34. 1974-05-02: Terror on the Beach (1973)
35. 1974-05-09: The McKenzie Break (1970) (Rerun from '72-73)
36. 1974-05-16: Pre-empted for CBS Special Presentations
37. 1974-05-23: Joy in the Morning (1965) (Rerun)
38. 1974-05-30: Kill a Dragon (1967)

Fridays (1973–74):

1. 1973-09-14: Planet of the Apes (1968)
2. 1973-09-21: Tora! Tora! Tora! (1970)
3. 1973-09-28: Kelly's Heroes, Part 2 (1970)
4. 1973-10-05: The Wrecking Crew (1968)
5. 1973-10-12: Bram Stoker's Dracula (1973) (Made-for-TV premiere)
6. 1973-10-19: Pre-empted for CBS Special Presentations
7. 1973-10-26: Beneath the Planet of the Apes (1970)
8. 1973-11-02: Pre-empted for CBS Special Presentations
9. 1973-11-09: Sunshine (1973) (Made-for TV premiere)
10. 1973-11-16: Escape from the Planet of the Apes (1971)
11. 1973-11-23: To Sir, with Love (1967) (Rerun from '71-72)
12. 1973-11-30: In Cold Blood (1967) (Rerun from '72-73)
13. 1973-12-07: The Homecoming: A Christmas Story (1971) (Rerun from '71-72)
14. 1973-12-14: Miracle on 34th Street (1973) (Made-for-TV premiere)
15. 1973-12-21: The Chairman (1969) (Rerun from '72-73)
16. 1973-12-28: Pre-empted by CBS Reports
17. 1974-01-04: The Gypsy Moths (1969) (Rerun from '72-73)
18. 1974-01-11: Hawaii (1966)
19. 1974-01-18: The Undefeated (1969) (Rerun from '72-73)
20. 1974-01-25: The Marcus-Nelson Murders (1973) (Rerun from '72-73)
21. 1974-02-01: Pre-empted for a CBS Reports Special
22. 1974-02-08: Dracula (1973) (Rerun)
23. 1974-02-15: Halls of Anger (1970)
24. 1974-02-22: Pre-empted by a G.E. Theater special presentation
25. 1974-03-01: Lawman (1971)
26. 1974-03-08: Pre-empted for CBS Special Presentations
27. 1974-03-15: The Sweet Ride (1968)
28. 1974-03-22: Senior Year (1974)
29. 1974-03-29: Pre-empted for CBS Special Presentations
30. 1974-04-05: The Family Kovack (1974) (Made-for-TV premiere)
31. 1974-04-12: Ben-Hur (1959) (Rerun from '70-71)
32. 1974-04-19: Nicki's World (1974) (Made-for-TV premiere)
33. 1974-04-26: Pre-empted for a CBS News Special
34. 1974-05-03: Pre-empted for a CBS Sports Special
35. 1974-05-10: Pre-empted for a CBS Sports Special
36. 1974-05-17: Captain Nemo and the Underwater City (1969)
37. 1974-05-24: Coffee, Tea or Me? (1973)
38. 1974-05-31: Honor Thy Father (1973) (Rerun from '72-73)

Thus, for the 1973–74 season, from mid-September until the end of May, The CBS Thursday (and Friday) Night Movie premiered only 22 theatrical titles. The remainder of the total 76 telecasts were either (a) reruns of theatrical films from previous seasons; (b) reruns or premieres of made-for-TV films; (c) TV pilot episodes for projected series; or (d) pre-emptions for CBS news, sports, or variety specials. When compared with the total of 52 theatrical-film premieres that the network aired during the 1966-67 season, one can observe that the number of available films for first-time broadcast had dropped by well over 50 percent. However, CBS did schedule four additional new titles to fill its roster during the summer of 1974. These included the June 6 TV premiere of The Prime of Miss Jean Brodie (1969), featuring Maggie Smith's Academy Award-winning performance as an unorthodox teacher in a 1930s Edinburgh girls' school. There was also the June 14th television debut of The Looking Glass War (1970), based on a John le Carré spy novel and starring Christopher Jones. And to round out its list of the season's newcomers, the Richard Burton film Villain (1971) premiered June 27, while the medieval drama Alfred the Great (1969), with David Hemmings in the title role, made its bow the next evening.

In the fall of 1974, one of CBS's competitors, NBC, premiered the TV-movie, Born Innocent. The film was the beneficiary of an intense promotional campaign by the network, as well as a provocative disclaimer just before its broadcast. And when it finally aired, viewers were exposed to what, up until then, was one of the most graphic depictions of sadism and cruelty ever presented on the small screen. The story's heroine (played by Linda Blair), a teen-ager serving time inside a juvenile detention center for young women, becomes the victim of sexual assault when she is forcibly violated with a foreign object by a gang of the institution's most violent inmates. A few weeks after the film's broadcast, a 9-year-old girl, walking with a friend along a San Francisco beach, was subjected to a similar act by a trio of teen-age boys. When the young perpetrators were questioned by authorities as to the reason they had chosen this method of attack, they freely admitted having been inspired by the film's controversial scene. Later that year, the mother of the victim sued NBC, claiming the organization was "responsible for this rape because the network had studies showing that children and susceptible people might imitate crimes seen on TV." The case was eventually thrown out of court, and an appeals panel would later affirm the lower court's judgment to nonsuit, but by then NBC had re-edited the scene for the movie's repeat airing. This case represented one of several legal skirmishes resulting from the television industry's decision to accommodate what CBS president Robert Wood had earlier described as "the changing tastes and standards of society and the growing maturity" of a 1970s audience.

In a way, Born Innocent represented a trend with which American cineastes had become all too familiar—specifically, the W.I.P. subgenre of films. Exploitation of the lucrative "women in prison" premise had reached a point where advertisements for theatrical B-movies, with titles such as Caged Heat (1974), The Big Bird Cage (1972), and Women in Cages (1971), became a familiar and titillating sight on just about every newspaper's amusement pages. Of course, a film like Born Innocent, a work produced specifically for television, could hardly resort to the kind of explicit sadism characteristic of the usual drive-in movie fodder. But NBC's film was sensational enough for CBS to program a copycat version that was aired on the Friday Night Movie just 6 months later. This new TV-film was titled Cage Without a Key and, again, it was set in a prison for young women. The heroine (this time, played by Susan Dey) is unwittingly involved in a crime planned and carried out by others. Convicted and sentenced, she is incarcerated in a venue where the inmates' favorite pastime is gang activity. Although St. Petersburg TV critic Charles Benbow argued that this new TV-film "differs significantly" from Born Innocent, author Elana Levine observed that "Cage features a post-shower, same-sex sexual assault scene that leaves its victim shaken and distraught, and in that respect it clearly follows Born Innocent's formula." And author Stephen Tropiano noted the attempt by both films to marginalize lesbians as predatory sex offenders.

As for the rest of its 1974-75 roster, the CBS Thursday (and Friday) Night Movies started with Robert Altman's original film version of M*A*S*H (1970), along with a trio of satirical westerns. This was the final full season for CBS's Thursday night movies.

Thursdays (1974–75):

1. 1974-09-12: Pre-empted for CBS Special Presentation
2. 1974-09-19: Support Your Local Gunfighter (1971)
3. 1974-09-26: Skin Game (1971)
4. 1974-10-03: The Hawaiians (1970)
5. 1974-10-10: The Good Guys and the Bad Guys (1969)
6. 1974-10-17: Sunshine (1973) (Rerun from '73-74)
7. 1974-10-24: The Cheyenne Social Club (1970)
8. 1974-10-31: Cold Turkey (1971)
9. 1974-11-07: How Sweet It Is! (1968)
10. 1974-11-14: Conquest of the Planet of the Apes (1972)
11. 1974-11-21: Pre-empted for a CBS Special Presentation
12. 1974-11-28: Pre-empted for a CBS Special Presentation
13. 1974-12-05: Pre-empted for a CBS Special Presentation
14. 1974-12-12: The Professionals (1966) (Rerun from '72-73)
15. 1974-12-19: Catlow (1971)
16. 1974-12-26: Wild Rovers (1971) (Rerun from '73-74)
17. 1975-01-02: The Wild Bunch (1969) (Rerun from '73-74)
18. 1975-01-09: Pre-empted by a CBS Special Presentation
19. 1975-01-16: The Mephisto Waltz (1971)
20. 1975-01-23: Mackenna's Gold (1969) (Rerun from '72-73)
21. 1975-01-30: The Family (1972)
22. 1975-02-06: Dirty Dingus Magee (1970)
23. 1975-02-13: Queen of the Stardust Ballroom (1975) (TV-movie premiere)
24. 1975-02-20: Attack on Terror: FBI vs. KKK (1975) Part 1. (TV-movie premiere)
25. 1975-02-27: In This House of Brede (1975)
26. 1975-03-06: Pre-empted for a CBS Special Presentation
27. 1975-03-13: Lawman (1971) (Rerun from '73-74)
28. 1975-03-20: Pre-empted by CBS Special Presentations
29. 1975-03-27: Pre-empted by CBS Special Presentations
30. 1975-04-03: Crime Club (1975) (Made-for-TV Premiere)
31. 1975-04-10: Pre-empted for a CBS News Special
32. 1975-04-17: The Hot Rock (1972) (Rerun from '73-74)
33. 1975-04-24: The Good Guys and the Bad Guys (1969) (Rerun)
34. 1975-05-01: Hawaii (1966) (Rerun from '73-74)
35. 1975-05-08: Generation (1969)
36. 1975-05-15: Larry (1974)
37. 1975-05-22: It's Good to Be Alive (1974) (TV-movie rerun from '73-74)
38. 1975-05-29: The Great White Hope (1970)
39. 1975-06-05: Nightmare (1974)
40. 1975-06-12: They Call Me Trinity (1972)
41. 1975-06-19: One is a Lonely Number (1972)

Fridays (1974–75):

1. 1974-09-13: M*A*S*H (1970)
2. 1974-09-20: Willard (1971)
3. 1974-09-27: Bonnie and Clyde (1967) (Rerun from '73-74)
4. 1974-10-04: Bullitt (1968) (Rerun from '73-74)
5. 1974-10-11: Aloha Means Goodbye (1974) (Made-for-TV premiere)
6. 1974-10-18: Fer-de-Lance (1974) (Made-for TV premiere)
7. 1974-10-25: They Only Kill Their Masters (1972)
8. 1974-11-01: The Graduate (1967) (Rerun from '73-74)
9. 1974-11-08: The FBI vs Alvin Karpis (1974) (Made-for-TV premiere)
10. 1974-11-15: The Stalking Moon (1968)
11. 1974-11-22: C.C. & Company (1970)
12. 1974-11-29: Miracle on 34th Street (1973) (Rerun from '73-74)
13. 1974-12-06: The Carey Treatment (1972)
14. 1974-12-13: Pre-empted for a CBS Special Presentation
15. 1974-12-20: Kansas City Bomber (1972) (Rerun from '73-74)
16. 1974-12-27: The Last Run (1971)
17. 1975-01-03: Chitty Chitty Bang Bang (1968) (Rerun from '72-73)
18. 1975-01-10: Pre-empted for a CBS Special Presentation
19. 1975-01-17: Battle for the Planet of the Apes (1973)/Shaft (1971)
20. 1975-01-24: Kelly's Heroes (1970) (Rerun from '73-74)
21. 1975-01-31: Pre-empted for CBS Special Presentations
22. 1975-02-07: Dillinger (1973)
23. 1975-02-14: Adventures of the Queen (1975) (Made-for-TV premiere)
24. 1975-02-21: Attack on Terror: FBI vs. KKK (1975) Part 2. (TV-movie premiere)
25. 1975-02-28: Golden Needles (1974)
26. 1975-03-07: Soylent Green (1973)
27. 1975-03-14: Cage Without a Key (1975) (Made-for-TV premiere)
28. 1975-03-21: Pre-empted for CBS Special Presentations
29. 1975-03-28: Force Five (1975) (Made-for-TV premiere)
30. 1975-04-04: The Other (1972)
31. 1975-04-11: Pre-empted for CBS Special Presentations
32. 1975-04-18: Pre-empted by CBS Sports Special
33. 1975-04-25: Planet of the Apes (1968) (Rerun from '73-74)
34. 1975-05-02: The Wrecking Crew (1968) (Rerun from '73-74)
35. 1975-05-09: Shell Game (1975) (TV-movie debut)/The Blue Knight (1975)
36. 1975-05-16: Don't Drink the Water (1969) (Rerun)/Going Home (1971)
37. 1975-05-23: Pre-empted for a CBS Sports Special
38. 1975-05-30: Dracula (1973) (Rerun from '73-74)
39. 1975-06-06: The Games (1970)/Zig Zag (1970)
40. 1975-06-13: One More Time (1970)/The People Next Door (1970)
41. 1975-06-20: The Boy Friend (1971)/Mrs. Pollifax (1970)

Since 1970, it had become customary for CBS to sprinkle its summer movie-rerun schedule with occasional first-time showings. Thus, in addition to the eight premieres in early June (as listed above), there was also the July 18 TV debut of The Wicked Dreams of Paula Schultz (1968), starring Elke Sommer as an East German athlete who pole-vaults over the Berlin Wall to the other side. The film was notable for featuring several actors from the 1965-1971 Hogan's Heroes television series, including Ms. Sommers's co-star Bob Crane, along with the show's other regulars, Werner Klemperer, John Banner, and Leon Askin.

== Fall 1975: The curtain closes on Thursdays ==
During the summer of 1975, all three networks decided to cut one movie night per week from their fall prime-time schedules. For CBS, it was a choice of keeping either a Thursday-night or a Friday-night anthology. Initially, the network chose to retain Thursday. As CBS program director Fred Silverman explained, "There aren't that many good pictures to begin with...We'd rather take those 2 hours [on Friday nights] and do original television programming. Because finally that's what television is all about: Creating new material for the viewer at home." Apparently, Mr. Silverman's idea of "creating new material" was the programming of more episodes for two old crime serials, Hawaii Five-O and Barnaby Jones—because beginning in September, that was what Friday night viewers were offered. But in cutting back the airing of theatrical films to its original movie-night, CBS may have provided some consolation for film buffs. There were fewer reruns of old product and less pre-emptions for news and variety specials. In that respect, the Fall 1975 season of The Thursday Night Movie would resemble the format of its maiden Fall 1965 schedule—one where viewers could feel reasonably confident that Thursday's 9:00-11:00 pm (ET) time slot would be reserved only for movies.

There were still occasional made-for-TV premieres, such as the sports biography Babe (1975), starring Susan Clark as the multi-talented athlete Babe Didrikson. In fact, this production was nearly doomed before it began. Earlier, when Babe's co-producer Stanley Rubin tried repeatedly to convince Didrikson's widower/husband George Zaharias to sell him the exclusive rights to her story, he flatly refused. As Rubin later recalled, "He said he had several opportunities to sell Babe's story. Once, he had gotten badly burned in some deal. So he was understandably leery of the whole thing." One Saturday, however, Zaharias relented and phoned Rubin, granting him permission for the story, but only if he hand-delivered a cashier's check by that very afternoon. Since few banks were open for business on weekends, Rubin was barely able to make it to Zaharias's residence in time with the necessary check to close the deal. As it turned out, Babe's reviews were quite good. Syndicated columnist Joan Hanauer, for example, praised writer Joanna Lee's scenario. She stated that even if Babe's story "loses in suspense because the end is preordained, [it] gains in poignancy because Babe was a real woman...whose beautifully functioning body was no more able to conquer cancer than those of her weaker sisters." It was positive critical reaction such as this that made Rubin's persistence pay off.

There was also the world premiere of the TV-movie Fear on Trial, which has been described by film critic James Monaco as "CBS's mea culpa about how it contributed to the anticommunist blacklisting" of media personalities during the 1950s. But as author Robert Sherill pointed out, "No matter how much pain they inflicted on individuals, corporations could always find a way to profit from their Cold War perfidy." Sherill further argued that CBS's new film did exactly that—by taking the real-life case of persecuted radio entertainer John Henry Faulk (played by William Devane) and dramatizing his battle in court, where he is ably represented by high-powered lawyer Louis Nizer (George C. Scott). Although the film carries an upbeat message, the reality of the trial's aftermath was far different. Faulk's cash judgment of $3.5 million was later reduced considerably on appeal. After paying his attorney, Faulk wound up with only $75,000, most of it spent on alimony payments. Later, as if to atone for its mistreatment, CBS offered Faulk a job as a regular on Hee Haw (1969–71).

Thursdays (1975):

1. 1975-09-11: Cahill: U.S. Marshal (1973)
2. 1975-09-18: Red Sun (1972)
3. 1975-09-25: Conrack (1974)
4. 1975-10-02: Fear on Trial (1975) (Made-for TV premiere)
5. 1975-10-09: Pat Garrett and Billy the Kid (1973)
6. 1975-10-16: They Only Kill Their Masters (1972) (Rerun from '74-75)
7. 1975-10-23: Babe (1975) (Made-for-TV premiere)
8. 1975-10-30: The French Connection (1971)
9. 1975-11-06: Mr. Majestyk (1974)
10. 1975-11-13: Pre-empted for CBS Special Presentation
11. 1975-11-20: Hannie Caulder (1972)

At mid-season, after over ten consecutive seasons on the air on Thursdays, CBS decided that Friday nights would become the lone designated prime-time movie night for the network, beginning December 5, 1975.
