= Las Vegas in the 1950s =

Period in history of the American city

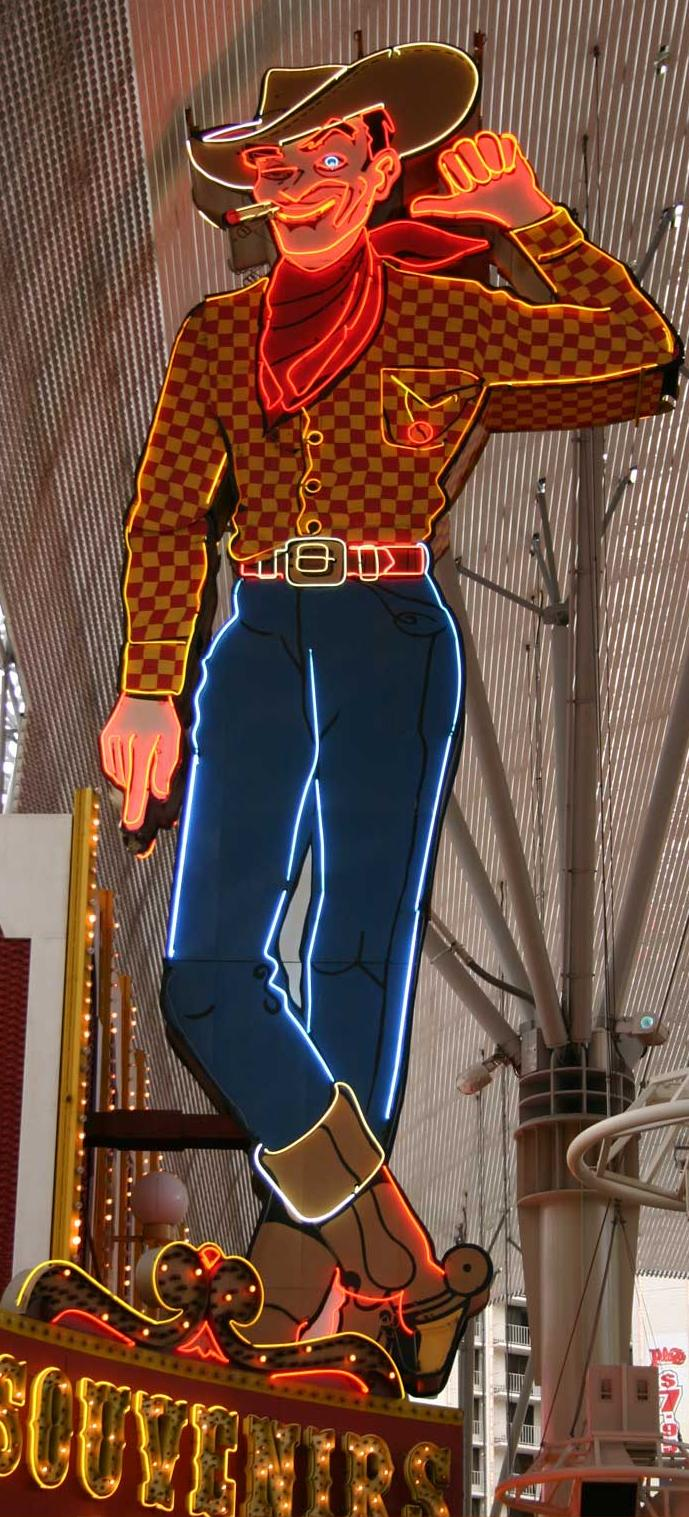
Vegas Vic of 1951 redone

The 1950s was a time of considerable change for Las Vegas. By the 1950s, there were 44,600 living in the Las Vegas Valley. Over 8 million people were visiting Las Vegas annually in 1954, pumping $200 million into casinos, which consolidated its image as "wild, full of late-night, exotic entertainment". The population grew dramatically from 8,422 during World War II to over 45,000. From 1952 to 1957, through money and institutional lending provided by the Teamsters Union and some Mormon bankers, they built the Sahara, the Sands, the New Frontier, the Royal Nevada, the Showboat, the Riviera, the Fremont, Binion's Horseshoe, and finally the Tropicana. Gambling was no longer the only attraction by the 1950s; the biggest stars of films and music like Frank Sinatra, Dean Martin, Sammy Davis Jr., Peter Lawford, Andy Williams, Liberace, Bing Crosby, Carol Channing, and others performed in intimate settings and brought a whole new brigade of Hollywood film stars and others in the entertainment business to the city. In 1957, the first topless show "Minsky's Follies" was started here.

== 1950–51 ==
While Las Vegas in 1940 had a population of 8,422, by 1950, it had increased to 24,624 people. The cornering of the gambling market in the city by suspected mob members sparked a two-year investigation by Senator Estes Kefauver and his Senate Special Committee to Investigate Crime in Interstate Commerce in 1950–51. The hearing concluded that organized crime money was incontrovertibly tied to the Las Vegas casinos and was becoming the controlling interest in the city thereby earning for the groups vast amounts of income which was strengthening their influence in the country. This led to a proposal by the Senate to institute federal gambling control. Only through the power and influence of Nevada's Senator Pat McCarran did the proposal die in committee. Along with their connections in Hollywood and New York City, these interests in Las Vegas were able to use publicity provided by these media capitals to steer the rapid growth of tourism into Las Vegas thereby dooming Galveston, Texas; Hot Springs, Arkansas; and other illegal gaming centers around the nation. Nevada's legal gaming as well as the paradoxical increased scrutiny by local and federal law enforcement in these other locales during the 1950s made their demise inevitable. Owned and operated by a joint combine of Mormon elders who provided political and business legitimacy and people involved with organized crime who provided unreported income and street muscle, such as Meyer Lansky, these crime hotels came to be regarded as the epitome of gambling entertainment.

In 1950, the Last Frontier's Western Village was converted into the Silver Slipper. The Desert Inn opened on 24 April 1950; Frank Sinatra's first performance at The Desert Inn was held in September 1951. The first edition of The Las Vegas Sun was published on July 1, 1950 by Hank Greenspun with the header "Las Vegas Morning Sun". Inquiry into organized crime was started by Senator Estes Kefauver on November 15, 1950.

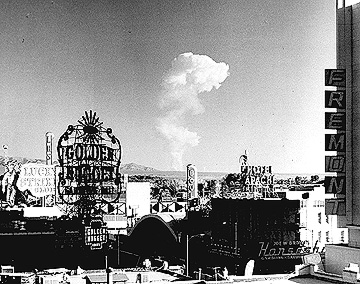
This view of downtown Las Vegas shows a mushroom cloud in the background. Scenes such as this were typical during the 1950s. From 1951 to 1962 the government conducted 100 atmospheric tests at the Nevada Test Site

Above-ground nuclear tests began at the Nevada Test Site, north of Las Vegas (65 miles (105 km) from downtown Las Vegas) on January 27, 1951. After it was shown on television on April 22, 1952, the Las Vegas town and the nation was gripped by the atomic fever and the Chamber of Commerce even brought out a calendar showing the vantage points to view the atomic sites. Atomic Cocktails, Atomic hair-dos, and Miss Atomic Blast beauty contests became popular with people in some of the casinos. Testing continued until the 1963 Test Ban Treaty came into effect and surface testing was banned and underground testing became mandatory.

In 1951, the Eldorado Club downtown was converted into Binion's Horseshoe Casino by Benny Binion. Binion styled the casino like an old-style riverboat, with low ceilings and velvet wallpaper. It was the first casino to have carpeting, as well as comps that were offered to all gamblers. He instituted high table limits and set the craps table limit at $500—ten times higher than any other casino in Las Vegas at the time. Ultimately, Binion's raised the table limit to $10,000 and even eliminated table limits completely at times, which was an immediate hit. Binion later served time in the Leavenworth Penitentiary from 1953 to 1957 for tax evasion and sold his share of the casino to fellow gambler Joe W. Brown. While Brown operated the casino, he installed the famous $1 million display on the casino floor. He sold the display in 1959, and it was later recreated using 100 $10,000 bills by Binion in 1964 when he regained control of it. The display became one of the casino's attractions.

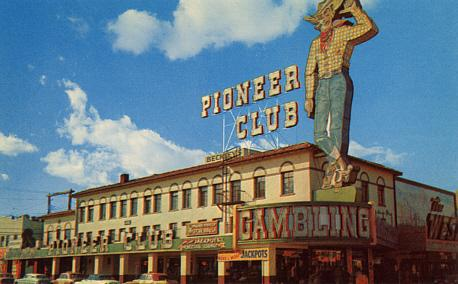
The Pioneer Club and Vegas Vic

Vegas Vic, the unofficial, yet most widely used name for a 40 ft neon sign that represents a cowboy, was erected above the Pioneer Club in Las Vegas in 1951. The sign was a departure in graphic design from typeface based neon signs, to a friendly and welcoming human form of a cowboy. The giant neon cowhand's creation was based on an image that was part of the promotional campaign launched by the slogan "Still a Frontier town". The voice message that was broadcast every 15 minutes by the mechanically operated image was "Howdy, pardner". This voice was not liked by people and hence its broadcast was stopped. The original figure (now restored) was of 40 ft height weighing about 6 tons (considered then as the largest such mechanical contraption sign in the world). The sign moved its arms, winked, held a cigarette and let out smoke rings. Its attire consisted of a cowboy hat, blue jeans, boots, a yellow checked shirt and a bandana.

== 1952–53 ==
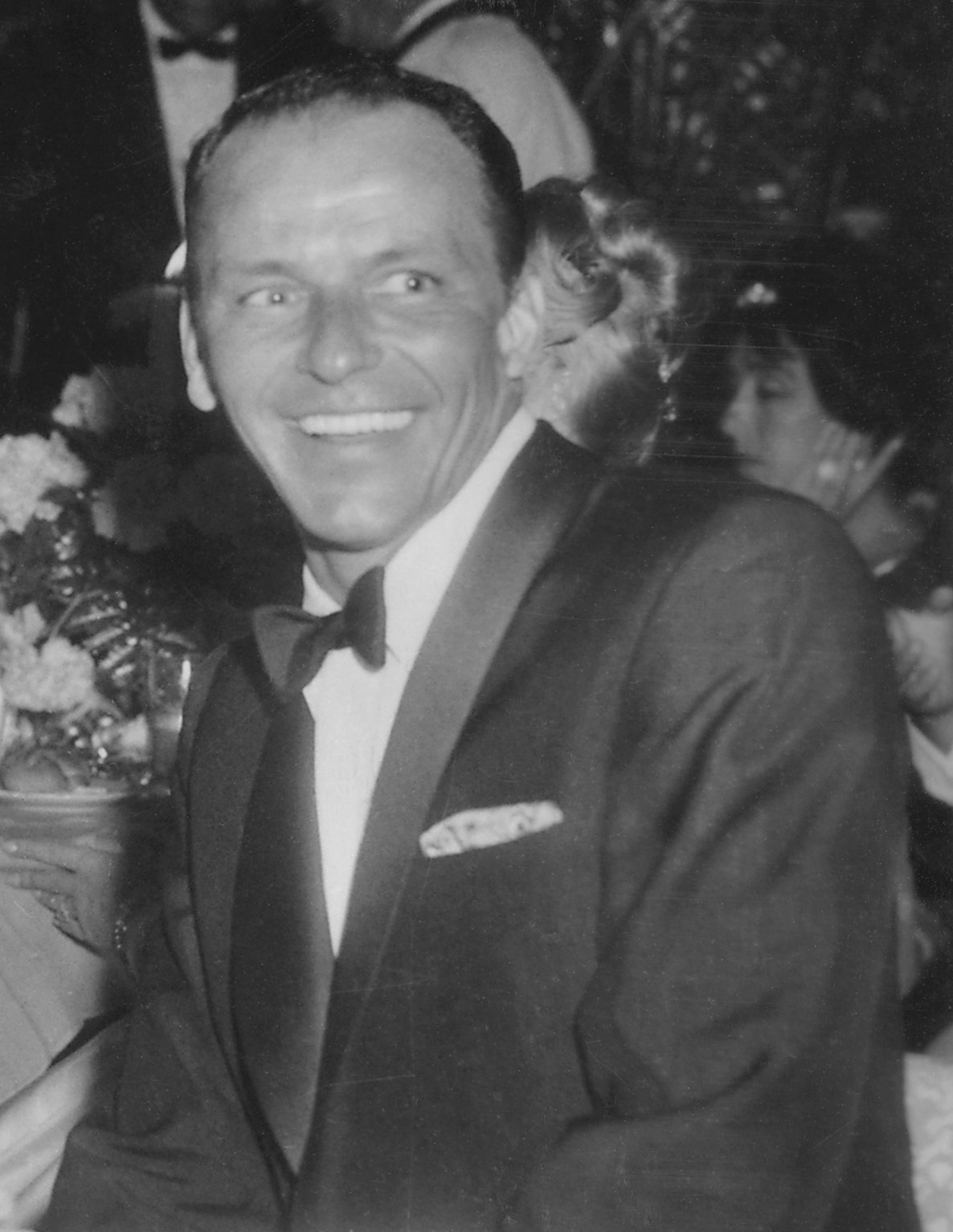
Frank Sinatra

The Sahara Hotel and Casino opened on October 7, 1952. In late 1954, the hotel hired jazz musician Louis Prima to be their late night lounge act, one of the earliest ones on the Las Vegas Strip. Along with his then wife Keely Smith and sax player Sam Butera, they created one of the largest late-night attractions on the Strip. In 1956, Abbott and Costello appeared together for the last time on the Sahara stage before their permanent breakup. The hotel constructed the first high-rise tower on the Strip in 1959, designed by Martin Stern.

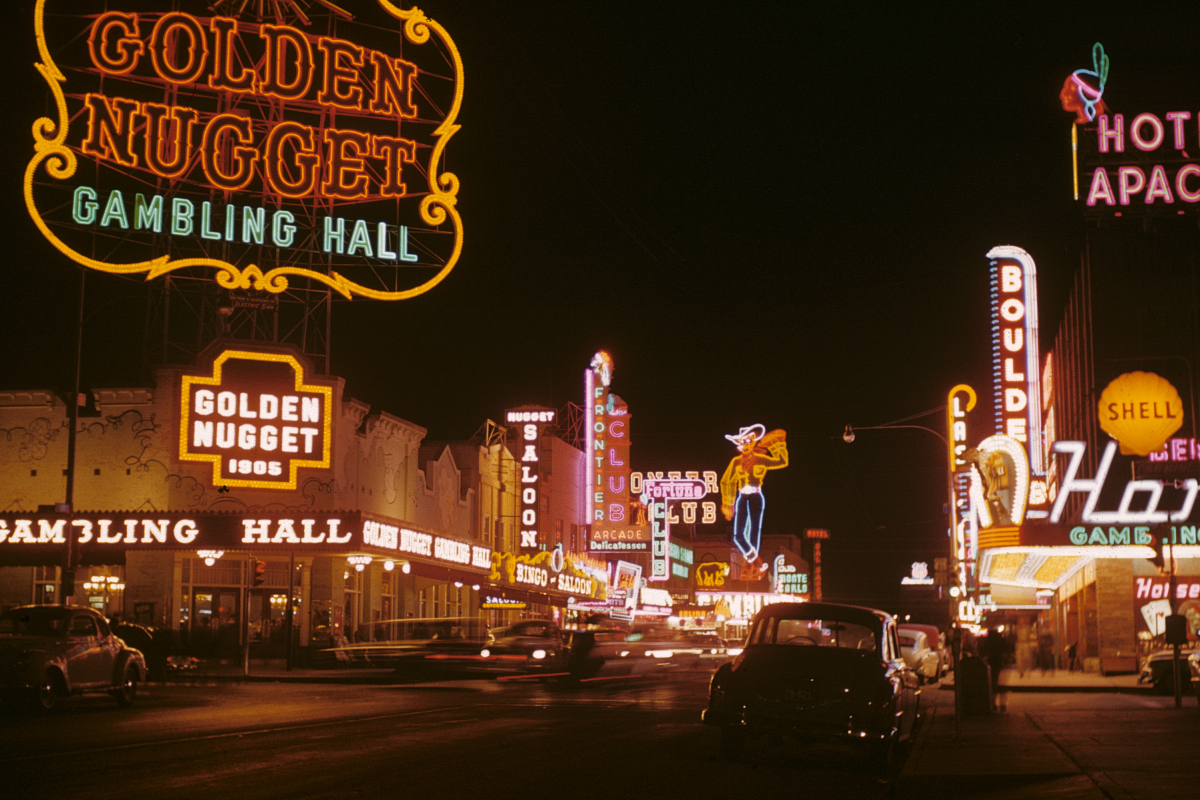
Golden Nugget and Pioneer Club along Fremont Street (1952).

The Sands Hotel and Casino, the seventh resort, opened on The Strip on December 15, 1952. The greatest names in the entertainment industry graced the Copa Room Stage, the showroom at the Sands, named after the famed Copacabana Club in New York City, including Judy Garland, Lena Horne, (she was billed at the Sands as "The Satin Doll"), Jimmy Durante, Pat Cooper, Shirley MacLaine, Marlene Dietrich, Ella Fitzgerald, Louis Armstrong, Robert Merrill, Red Skelton, and many others. The public could sit ringside in a showroom holding no more than five hundred, paying as little as three dollars in the 1950s. Much of the musical success of the Copa Room is credited to the room's band leader and musical conductor Antonio Morelli. Morelli not only acted as the band leader and musical conductor for the Copa Room during the hotel's Rat Pack heyday in the 1950s and 1960s, he also played that role on hundreds of recorded albums by those same entertainers who graced the stage of the Copa including Frank Sinatra, Sammy Davis Jr., Tony Bennett, Dean Martin, and many others. The Las Vegas Convention & Visitors Authority came to be established in 1953 and local television was also started in the same year on 22 July 1953 by Greenspun and others. Las Vegas Park was opened on September 4, 1953 with horse racing events, which lasted for only 13 days.

== 1954–55 ==
By 1954, over 8 million people were visiting Las Vegas yearly pumping $200 million into casinos. Gambling was no longer the only attraction; the biggest stars of films and music like Frank Sinatra, Dean Martin, Andy Williams, Liberace, Bing Crosby, Carol Channing, and others performed in intimate settings. After coming to see these stars, the tourists would resume gambling, and then eat at the gourmet buffets that have become a staple of the casino industry. As the city became a center for gambling, illegal activity became rife and many muckraking scandals emerged in the press during the 1950s and 1960s. For instance, in 1954, County Sheriff Glen Jones was revealed as a brothel owner and led to the resignation of state Democratic Governor Clifford Jones.

A new utility company, Southwest Gas, expanded into Las Vegas in 1954. In October 1954, the first-ever regents' meeting was held in Las Vegas by the Nevada Southern students.

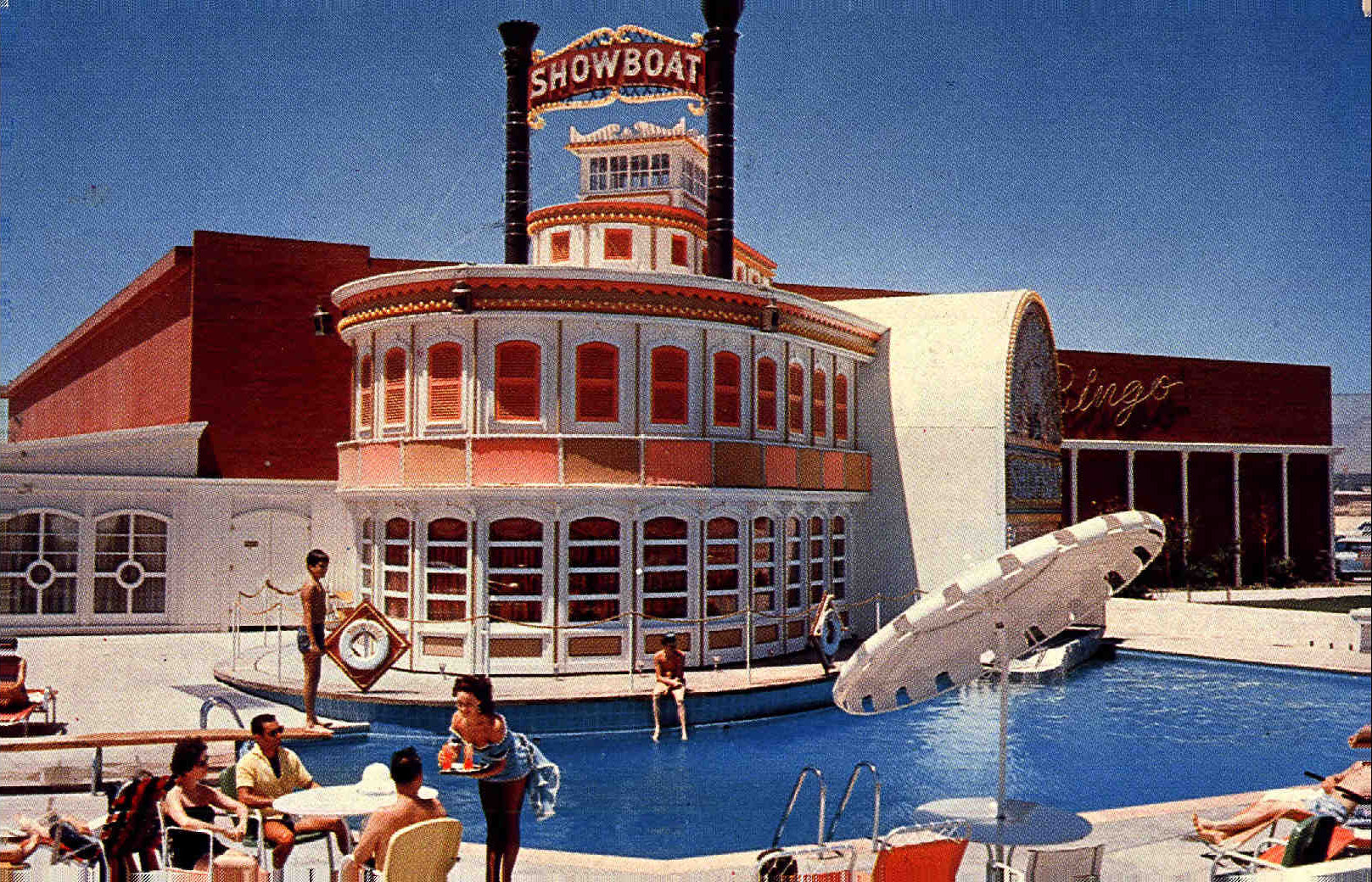
Showboat facade and swimming pool, seen in 1961

The Last Frontier held a two week show by Ronald Reagan from April 28, 1954, and on that day, the Roxie's, a bordello on the Boulder Highway, was raided. The Showboat Hotel and Casino was inaugurated on September 3, 1954 along the Boulder Highway by Bill Moore, J. Kell Houssels, and Joe Kelley with a speech by then mayor C.D. Baker. It was billed as "Las Vegas's first resort hotel" and marked an important landmark in the city's history and development.

The Showboat was built by William J. Moore of the Last Frontier and J. Kell Houssels of the Las Vegas Club for $2 million. The first resort within Las Vegas city limits, it had 100 rooms on two floors. While Moore and Houssels ran the hotel, the casino was leased by a group of managers from the Desert Inn, including Moe Dalitz. After several unsuccessful years, Joe Kelley took over management, and began successfully targeting local customers with forty-nine cent breakfast specials and other promotions. Kelley added a bowling alley in 1959, which soon became the Showboat's signature attraction, hosting nationally televised PBA tournaments.

The Côte d'Azur–themed The Riviera was established, becoming the ninth big hotel to open on the Strip, and the Strip's first high-rise. The opening of the Riviera, along with The Dunes and the Royal Nevada casino resorts within a month were the subject of a famous issue of the magazine Life, on June 20, 1955, with a Moulin Rouge showgirl on its cover. The headline was Las Vegas—Is Boom Overextended? and a story about how Las Vegas had built too many hotel rooms to be profitable. The Riviera was built by a group of investors from Miami. The resort has gone through many ownership changes over the years, including a period of control by owners linked to the Mafia. Harpo Marx and Gummo Marx held minority interests at the opening. The Marx brothers also owned slightly under ten percent of the hotel. It is said that Gummo talked his brother into putting money into the hotel, for it would be a great place for him to perform. Harpo was easily sold. Dean Martin once held a minority ownership stake while he was a headliner in the showroom. Gus Greenbaum was brought in to manage the Riviera in 1955. He had successfully managed the Flamingo Hotel after the death of Bugsy Siegel. However, Greenbaum's drug and gambling addictions led to his embezzling from the casino. In December 1958, Greenbaum and his wife were murdered in their Phoenix, Arizona, home, reportedly on the orders of either Meyer Lansky or Tony Accardo.

The Gaming Control Board was set up by the Nevada Tax Commission on 29 March 1955. The Riviera, a nine storied building then the tallest in Las Vegas opened 20 April 20, 1955. Las Vegas celebrated its 50th anniversary on 15 May. The Dunes was the 10th resort on The Strip, which opened on May 23, 1955. The Moulin Rouge, the first racially integrated hotel, opened on May 24, 1955. In June 1955, Noël Coward was paid a reported $160,000 for a 4-week nightclub performance at the Desert Inn.

== 1956–57 ==
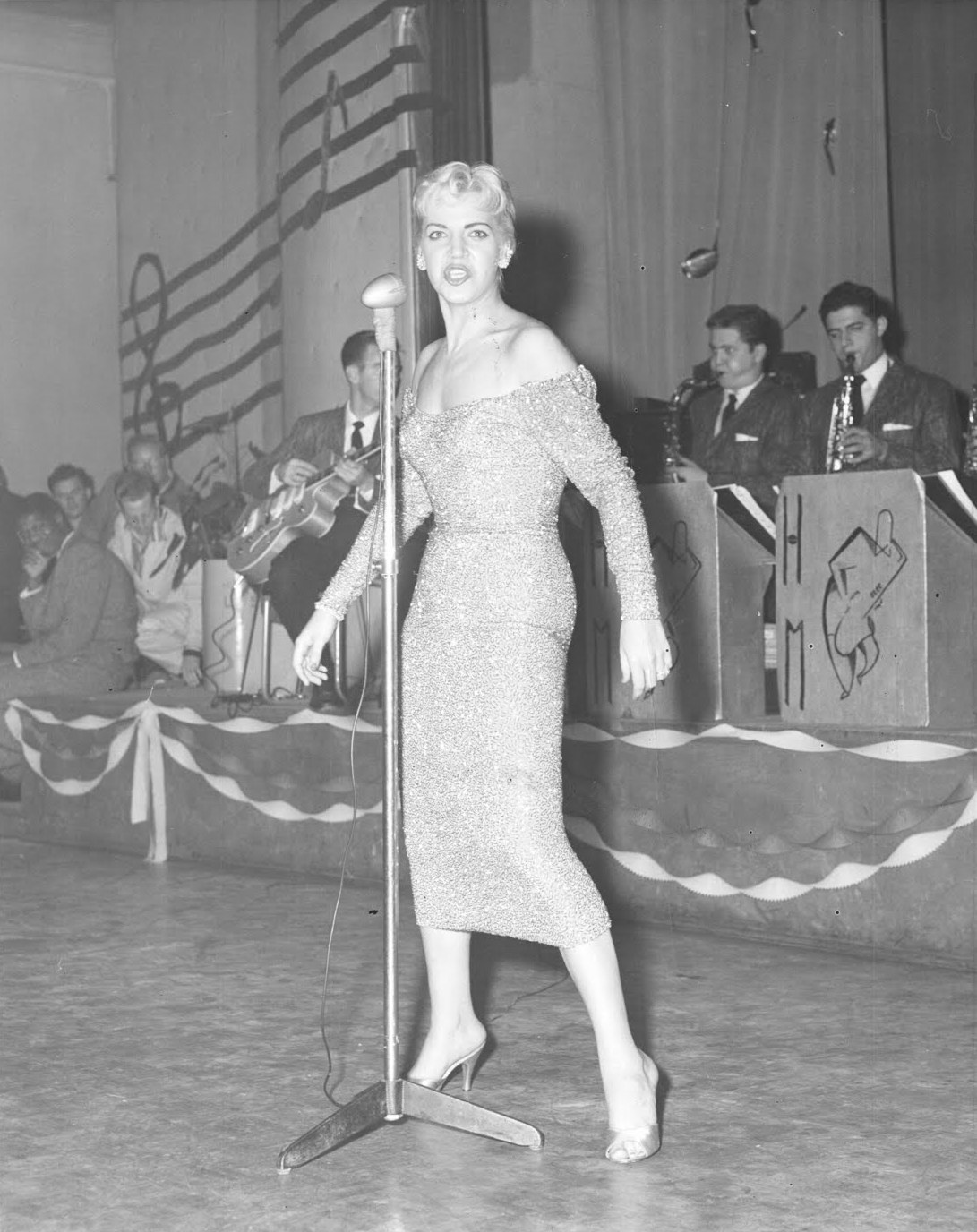
Lillian Briggs performing at the Sands Hotel (1956)

The New Frontier Hotel was the venue of Elvis Presley's first shows in Las Vegas starting from April 23, 1956. The 12-story tall Fremont Hotel and Casino located on 200 Fremont Street opened on May 18, 1956 and was the tallest building in downtown Las Vegas for several years. It was designed by architect Wayne McAllister, and at the time of its opening it had 155 rooms, cost $6 million to open and was owned by Ed Levinson and Lou Lurie. In 1959 Wayne Newton made his start in Las Vegas at the Fremont at its Carnival Lounge. The Thunderbirds, an aerial demonstration squadron was established at the Nellis Air Force Base on June 1, 1956. The Silver Palace, a double storied building was opened on June 8, 1956. The Hacienda opened in that same month.

The "Minsky's Follies", a debut show of the Showgirls opened at the Desert Inn on January 10, 1957. The Tropicana opened on April 3, 1957 at the Tropicana – Las Vegas Boulevard intersection. In 1955, Ben Jaffe, an executive of the Fontainebleau Miami Beach, came to Las Vegas and bought a 40-acre parcel at the corner of Las Vegas Boulevard and Bond Road (now Tropicana Avenue). Jaffe aimed to build the finest hotel in Las Vegas, featuring a Cuban ambience, with four room themes for guests to choose from: French Provincial, Far East, Italian Renaissance, and Drexel. Construction ran over schedule and over budget, due in part to competition for labor with the under-construction Stardust down the road. Jaffe had to sell his interest in the Fontainebleau to complete the project, which finally opened in April 1957. Jaffe first leased the property to his associate, Phil Kastel. The Gaming Control Board raised suspicions over Kastel's links to organized crime, which were confirmed in May when a note bearing a Tropicana earnings figure was found in the possession of mobster Frank Costello. Jaffe next turned to J. Kell Housells, owner of the Las Vegas Club. By 1959, Housells bought out Jaffe's interest, gaining a majority share in the Tropicana.

On September 10, 1957, the University of Nevada, Las Vegas, (UNLV) was first established, initially as a branch of the University of Nevada, Reno and becoming independent in 1969. Irwin Molasky, Nathan Adelson, Moe Dalitz, and Allard Roen built Sunrise Hospital in mid-December 1958, financed in part by $1,000,000 (equivalent to about $12,000,000 in 2025) loaned to them by Jimmy Hoffa from the Teamsters pension fund; Nathan's son, Merv Adelson served as the hospital's first president after it opened in 1958.

== 1958–59 ==
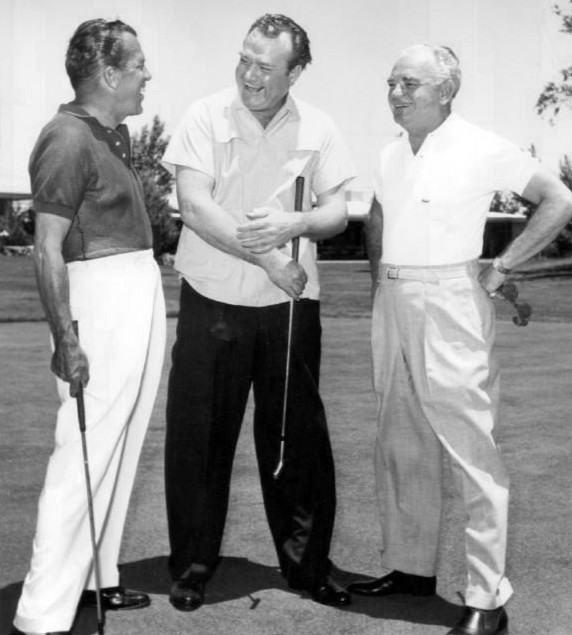
Ed Sullivan, Red Skelton, and Wilbur Clark at Desert Inn (1959)

By 1958, the Stardust brought in the French production show, Lido de Paris. The Gaming Commission of Nevada was established on 30 March 1959. In 1959, the Clark County Commission built the Las Vegas Convention Center, which would become a vital part of the area's economy. The Las Vegas sign board, an iconic symbol of Las Vegas, titled “Welcome Las Vegas Nevada” which is an illuminated sign board designed by Betty Willis for Young Electric Sign Company (YESCO), was installed in 1959.

Commercial and residential developments developed north and east of Charleston Boulevard. Prudential Homes announced it would build 640 homes in what is now Lorenzi Park. In the late 1950s and early 1960s, the Miranti brothers of American Homes, built a number of large family home developments in the Las Vegas vicinity. In the early 1950s, Louigi's Italian restaurant opened on the strip; by the mid-1950s, the Venetian Pizzeria opened near Downtown; and in the later part of the decade, Tony's Italian Restaurant opened on Fremont Street.
