= Everything to Gain =

1996 television film

- Also known as: Barbara Taylor Bradford's Everything to Gain
- Genre: Drama; Mystery; Romance
- Based on: Everything to Gain by Barbara Taylor Bradford
- Written by: Cathleen Young
- Directed by: Michael Miller
- Starring: Sean Young; Jack Scalia; Anne Ramsay; Joanna Miles
- Music by: James Di Pasquale
- Country of origin: United States
- Original language: English

Production
- Executive producers: Andrew Adelson; Gary Adelson; Tracey Alexander; Robert Bradford
- Production location: Montreal
- Cinematography: Pierre Mignot
- Editor: Gordon McClellan
- Running time: 87 minutes
- Production company: Adelson Entertainment

Original release
- Network: CBS
- Release: October 13, 1996

Everything to Gain (also known as Barbara Taylor Bradford's Everything to Gain) is a 1996 American made-for-television romantic drama film starring Sean Young and Jack Scalia, directed by Michael Miller and based on a novel by Barbara Taylor Bradford.

== Cast ==
- Sean Young as Mallory Ashton Jordan Keswick
- Jack Scalia as Detective Michael DeMarco
- Anne Ramsay as Sarah Kempner
- Joanna Miles as Jessica Jordan
- Samantha Eggar as Diana Keswick
- Charles Shaughnessy as Andrew Keswick
- Cedric Smith as Edward Jordan
- Jason Cavalier as Alvin Charles
- Vik Sahay as Roland Jellico
- Don Jordan as Paulie Edwards
