= LVCC =

LVCC may refer to:

- Las Vegas Convention Center
- Las Vegas Country Club
- Liverpool Victoria County Championship, the current name for the first-class cricket competition in England and Wales
