= Allard Roen =

American businessman

- Born: May 8, 1921; Cleveland, Ohio, US
- Died: August 28, 2008 (aged 87); Carlsbad, California, US
- Education: Duke University
- Occupation: Businessman
- Spouse: Evelyn Roen
- Children: 4

Allard Roen (May 8, 1921 – August 28, 2008) was an American businessman in the hospitality industry. He was the Managing Director of the Desert Inn and the Stardust Resort and Casino in Paradise, Nevada. He was a co-founder of the Sunrise Hospital, The Boulevard Mall and the Las Vegas Country Club. Later, he was a co-founder and the on-site Manager of the La Costa Resort and Spa in Carlsbad, California.

== Biography ==
=== Early life ===
Roen was born on May 8, 1921, in Cleveland, Ohio. He was awarded a baseball scholarship to attend Duke University, and graduated with a Bachelor of Science degree in Business in 1943. He served as Lieutenant in the United States Navy from 1943 to 1946.

=== Career ===
Allard arrived in Las Vegas, Nevada, in 1949. Shortly after, he was hired by Moe Dalitz to serve as the Managing Director of the Desert Inn. As such, he negotiated with labor unions and construction companies to build the casino. Shortly after it was built, in 1952, he added a golf course for guests. When Dalitz acquired the Stardust Resort and Casino, Roen became its Managing Director as well. In this capacity, he negotiated for the Le Lido, a Paris-based cabaret company, to perform at the Desert Inn. A proponent of civil rights, he reached an agreement with the NAACP to allow black guests at the Desert Inn and the Stardust in 1960. Eventually, he negotiated to sell the Desert Inn to Howard Hughes.

With Moe Dalitz, Irwin Molasky and Merv Adelson, he founded Paradise Development, a real estate development company in the 1950s. Together, they founded the Sunrise Hospital, The Boulevard Mall and the Las Vegas Country Club. Roen served as the first president of the Nevada Resort Association. He also served on the board of trustees of the Las Vegas Convention and Visitors Authority.

In the late 1960s, he reconvened with Molasky and Adelson to develop the La Costa Resort and Spa in Carlsbad, California. The luxury resort had a golf course and an equestrian center. Roen served as its on-site manager from 1967 to 1987. The resort was eventually sold to Sports Shinko Co., a Japanese company, in 1987.

=== Personal life ===
He was married to Evelyn Roen. They had a son, Jeffrey, and three daughters, Judy, Priscilla, and Melissa. Roen was one of the founders of the Jewish Federation of Las Vegas.

=== Death ===
He died of heart disease on August 28, 2008, in Carlsbad, California, at the age of eighty-seven. His funeral took place at El Camino Memorial Park in San Diego, California.
