= LPGA Takefuji Classic =

Golf tournament formerly on the LPGA Tour

The LPGA Takefuji Classic was an annual golf tournament for professional female golfers on the LPGA Tour that took place every year from 2000 through 2006. Between 2000 and 2002 it was held at two different courses in Hawaii. Between 2003 and 2006 it was played at Las Vegas Country Club in Las Vegas, Nevada.

In August, 2006 the LPGA declined to renew the LPGA Takefuji Classic's spot on the 2007 LPGA Tour schedule. In response the tournament operators posted this message on the official tournament web site:

"To all our volunteers, media, sponsors and spectators: thank you all for the support, time and effort you gave to help make the LPGA Takefuji Classic such a success during the last four years. We regret to inform you that the new Commissioner of the LPGA does not feel Las Vegas is a good market for the tour and we will not be continuing the tournament. We enjoyed working with you and wish you all the best."

The last tournament was held from April 10–15, 2006.

== Winners ==
Year	Champion	Country	Score	Tournament location	Purse ($)	Winner's share ($)
2006	Lorena Ochoa	Mexico	197 (−19)	Las Vegas Country Club	1,100,000	165,000
2005	Wendy Ward	United States	200 (−16)	Las Vegas Country Club	1,100,000	165,000
2004	Cristie Kerr	United States	209 (−7)	Las Vegas Country Club	1,100,000	165,000
2003	Candie Kung	Taiwan	204 (−12)	Las Vegas Country Club	1,100,000	165,000
2002	Annika Sörenstam	Sweden	196 (−14)	Waikoloa Beach Resort	900,000	135,000
2001	Lorie Kane	Canada	205 (−11)	Kona Country Club	850,000	127,500
2000	Karrie Webb	Australia	207 (−9)	Kona Country Club	800,000	120,000

== Tournament record ==
Year	Player	Score	Round	Course
2001	Tina Barrett	66 (−6)	2nd	Kona Country Club
2001	Lorie Kane	66 (−6)	3rd	Kona Country Club
2002	Kasumi Fujii	61 (−9)	1st	Waikoloa Beach Resort
2005	Lorena Ochoa	63 (−9)	2nd	Las Vegas Country Club
2005	Shi Hyun Ahn	63 (−9)	3rd	Las Vegas Country Club
2006	Lorena Ochoa	63 (−9)	1st	Las Vegas Country Club
2006	Juli Inkster	63 (−9)	3rd	Las Vegas Country Club
