= Molasky Corporate Center =

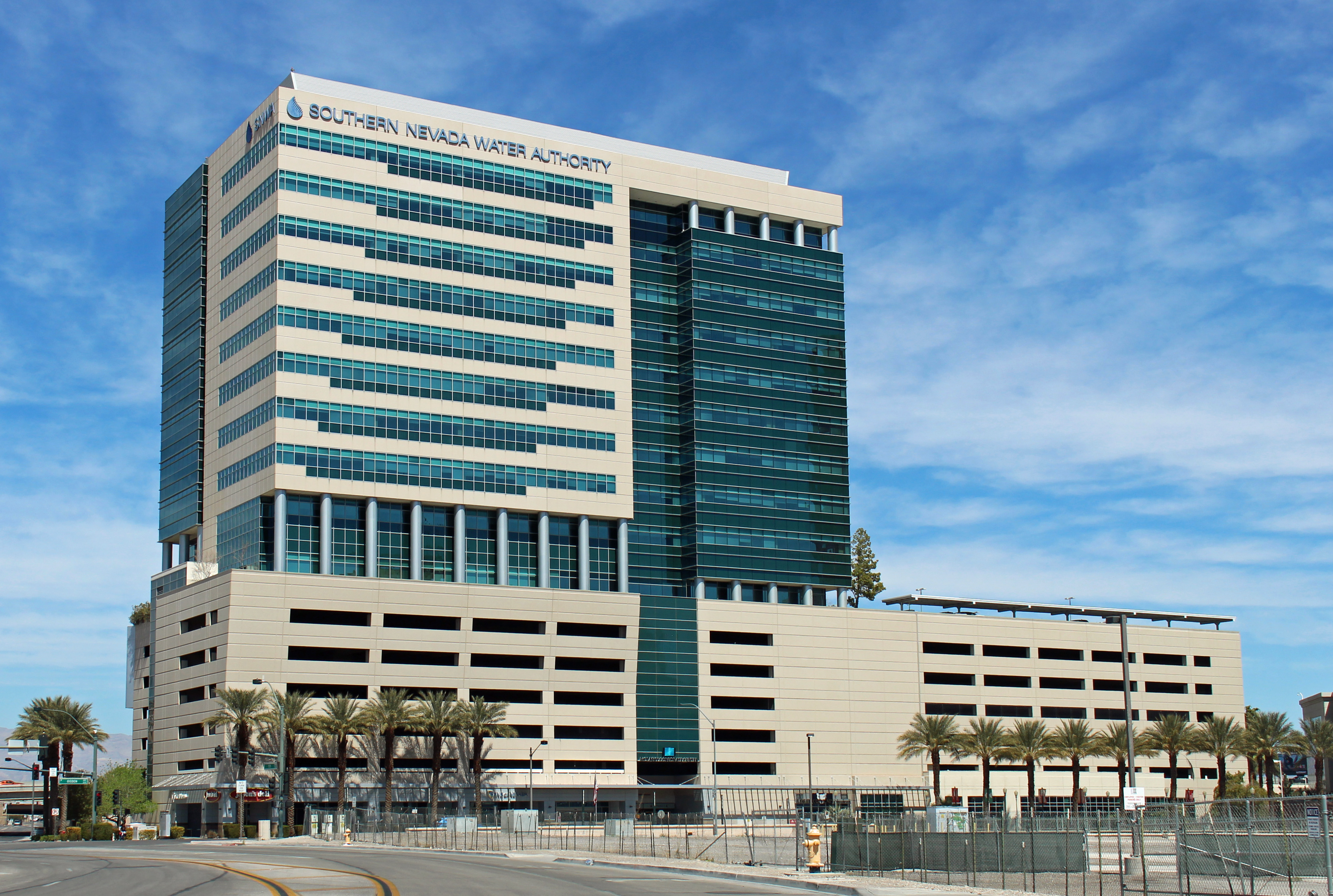
- Molasky Corporate Center in 2023
- Interactive map of the Molasky Corporate Center area

General information
- Status: Completed
- Type: Office and retail
- Location: 100 City Parkway, Las Vegas, Nevada, United States
- Coordinates: 36.174121°N 115.148061°W
- Current tenants: Southern Nevada Water Authority (SNWA)
- Named for: Irwin Molasky
- Construction started: 2005
- Topped-out: July 2006
- Opened: August 2007
- Cost: $107 million
- Owner: The Molasky Group; SNWA (five floors)

Technical details
- Floor count: 17
- Grounds: 2.3 acres (0.93 ha)

Design and construction
- Architecture firm: Howard F. Thompson & Associates
- Developer: The Molasky Group
- Main contractor: Marnell Corrao

Website
- www.molaskycenter.com

Molasky Corporate Center is a 17-story office and retail building in downtown Las Vegas, Nevada. It was developed by Irwin Molasky's company, The Molasky Group. Construction began in 2005, and the building was topped off in July 2006, before opening in August 2007. The Molasky Corporate Center is a green building designed with energy efficient features which earned it a Gold certification from the Leadership in Energy and Environmental Design (LEED). The Southern Nevada Water Authority is a major tenant in the building, and owns five of its office floors.

== History ==
In December 2004, developer Irwin Molasky was planning a $75 million office building in downtown Las Vegas through his company, The Molasky Group. The project, known as Parkway Center, would be located on property at the intersection of Grand Central Parkway and F Street (later renamed City Parkway), directly south of Highway 95 and Interstate 15. The vacant 2.3-acre (0.93 ha) property was worth $2 million, and the city gave Molasky the land on the condition that he use it for the construction of extensive office space to generate substantial property taxes for the city. The 14 ½-story building would include a 6 ½-story parking garage topped by eight floors of office space. The project, designed by Howard F. Thompson & Associates, would include 192,000 sq ft (17,800 m^{2}) of office space.

Later in December 2004, the Southern Nevada Water Authority (SNWA) approved plans to lease at least five floors of office space in the building, totaling 129,000 sq ft (12,000 m^{2}), with the option to lease further space in the future. SNWA would be the first major tenant in the new building, which would become SNWA's new headquarters. Molasky's company would be headquartered on the top floor, and discussions were underway with other tenants interested in leasing the remaining office space not used by SNWA, which signed a 20-year, $63.3 million lease for seven floors in the new building, totaling 190,000 sq ft (18,000 m^{2}). The lease included the option for SNWA to purchase the entire building at the end of its lease. Parkway Center was expected to open in 2007, and would be one of the largest office buildings in Las Vegas. The building was expected to generate $500,000 annually in property taxes for the city.

In February 2005, The Molasky Group sold its 17-story Bank of America Plaza building in downtown Las Vegas for $72 million, helping finance other projects such as Parkway Center. Construction began in 2005, with Marnell Corrao as the general contractor. By April 2006, the project was known as the Molasky Corporate Center, with 16 stories planned. The building was topped off in July 2006. By October 2006, the 1,400-space parking garage was nearly complete. The Class A office building was 80 percent pre-leased up to that point. Notable tenants, in addition to SNWA, included the Las Vegas Valley Water District, Bank of Nevada, a Jason's Deli restaurant, and a 24 Hour Fitness gym. Construction was nearing completion in March 2007, by which point two major law firms had signed on as tenants: Ballard Spahr Andrews & Ingersoll; and Brownstein, Hyatt, Farber, Schreck.

The building opened in August 2007, when the first SNWA employees began working in it. It was the first new office tower in downtown Las Vegas in nearly 40 years and it helped to revitalize the area. It is also the only building by Irwin Molasky to feature his name. The building, located at 100 City Parkway, was built at a cost of $107 million.

In December 2007, SNWA approved plans to purchase five of the seven floors that it leased in the building, at a sale price of $34.6 million. SNWA had the option to gradually purchase remaining parts of the building over the next 15 years. In May 2012, SNWA approved a lease for its first tenant in 3,000 sq ft (280 m^{2}) of its unused office space, which would be occupied by a firm specializing in public relations and government affairs. SNWA had an additional 30,000 sq ft (2,800 m^{2}) of vacant space on its five floors. As of April 2015, the Molasky Corporate Center was the only Class A office building in the Las Vegas Valley with zero vacancy.

== Architecture ==
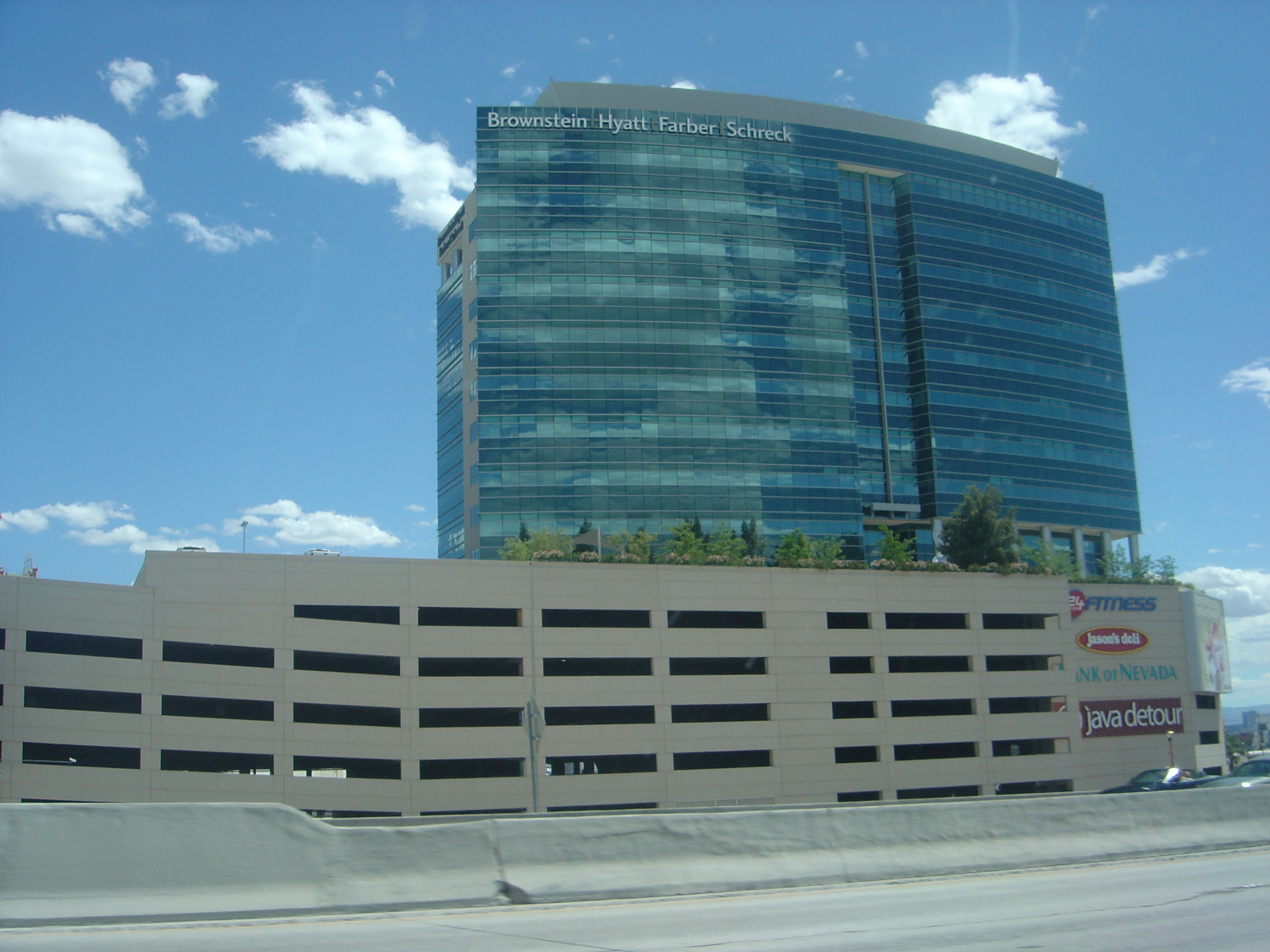
Rear of the building, seen from Highway 95 in 2010

The Molasky Corporate Center is a 17-story green building and was designed with energy efficient features. Upon opening, it was Las Vegas' only Class A green office tower. The building has 852,000 sq ft (79,200 m^{2}) of space, including 285,000 sq ft (26,500 m^{2}) of office space. The building is made of glass and steel, qualifying it as Class A office space. It includes energy efficient glass solar panels that create electricity for the building, and air vents are situated on the floor instead of the ceiling, providing cleaner air to people inside. Chilled water used for the air conditioner is recaptured and used for the property's landscaping. The building's insulation consists of shredded, recycled blue jeans. The building was constructed with 97 percent recycled steel, and countertops in the retail area were made with 95 percent recycled steel and crushed glass. The office space includes special tiles that have computer and electrical outlets which can be moved around with ease. Much of the interior is lit by sunlight. At night, the building is lit with green accent lighting and a yellow crown.

Initially, Molasky sought a Silver Leadership in Energy and Environmental Design (LEED) certification from the U.S. Green Building Council. Ultimately, the building received a Gold certification instead. As of 2007, the building was among approximately 200 in the world to receive the Gold certification. It was the first green office building in Las Vegas to receive a Gold rating. Between $5 million and $7 million was spent to bring the building up to Gold LEED standards, and as of 2007, the cost was not expected to be redeemed for 12 to 15 years. The building uses 35 percent less water and 37 percent less electricity in comparison to a similarly sized, non-LEED certified structure.

In December 2007, footage of the Molasky Corporate Center was filmed for a six-part PBS documentary about green buildings in Nevada. The building helped Nevada become the top U.S. state in 2011 for the construction of green buildings. In May 2014, judges for the Building Owners and Managers Association awarded it The Outstanding Building of the Year (TOBY) Award, praising its environmental design features and writing that the building "is impressive" and "leaves no doubt to its quality. The staff is well-seasoned and experienced."
