= Gary Adelson =

American television producer (born 1953)

- Born: April 22, 1953 (age 72); Los Angeles, California, U.S.
- Father: Merv Adelson
- Relatives: Andrew Adelson (brother)

Gary Adelson (born April 22, 1953) is an American television and film producer.

== Biography ==
Adelson is the son Lori (née Kaufman) and Merv Adelson. He has one sister and a brother: Ellen Adelson Ross and Andrew Adelson.

== Filmography ==
- 2003 Peter Pan (co-producer)
- 1997 Love in Another Town (TV Movie) (executive producer)
- 1997 The Hunchback of Notre Dame (TV Movie) (executive producer)
- 1996 Critical Choices (TV Movie) (executive producer)
- 1996 Rolling Thunder (TV Movie) (executive producer)
- 1996 Everything to Gain (TV Movie) (executive producer)
- 1995 Jade (producer)
- 1995 Hidden Assassin (executive producer)
- 1994 It Could Happen to You (executive producer)
- 1994 Blank Check (producer)
- 1993 Nowhere to Run (producer)
- 1991 Hook (co-producer)
- 1991 Lies of the Twins (TV Movie) (executive producer)
- 1990 Hard to Kill (producer)
- 1990 The Bobby & Larry Show (TV Movie) (executive producer)
- 1989 Tap (producer)
- 1989 Studio 5-B (TV Series) (executive producer - 6 episodes) (producer - 1 episode)
- 1989 Surro-Gate (executive producer)
- 1989 To Air Is Human (executive producer)
- 1989 Dirty Laundry (executive producer)
- 1989 The Perfect View (executive producer)
- 1989 Life's Too Short (executive producer)
- 1988 Glitz (TV Movie) (executive producer)
- 1987 In the Mood (producer)
- 1987 Spies (TV Series) (producer)
- 1986 The Boy Who Could Fly (producer)
- 1985 HeartBeat (TV Movie) (executive producer)
- 1985 Lace II (TV Movie) (executive producer)
- 1984 The Last Starfighter (producer)
- 1984 Lace (TV Mini-Series) (executive producer - 2 episodes)
- 1983 The Winter of Our Discontent (TV Movie) (executive producer)
- 1982 Cass Malloy (TV Movie) (executive producer)
- 1981 Our Family Business (TV Movie) (executive producer)
- 1977-1981 Eight Is Enough (TV Series) (producer - 81 episodes) (supervising producer - 22 episodes) (associate producer - 1 episode)
- 1981 Father Knows Best? (supervising producer)
- 1981 Goals (supervising producer)
- 1981 Starting Over (supervising producer)
- 1981 The Idolbreaker: Part 1 and Part 2 (supervising producer)
- 1979 Flatbush (TV Series) (executive producer - 1 episode)
- 1979 Moving Out (executive producer)
