= Lee Rich =

American film and television producer

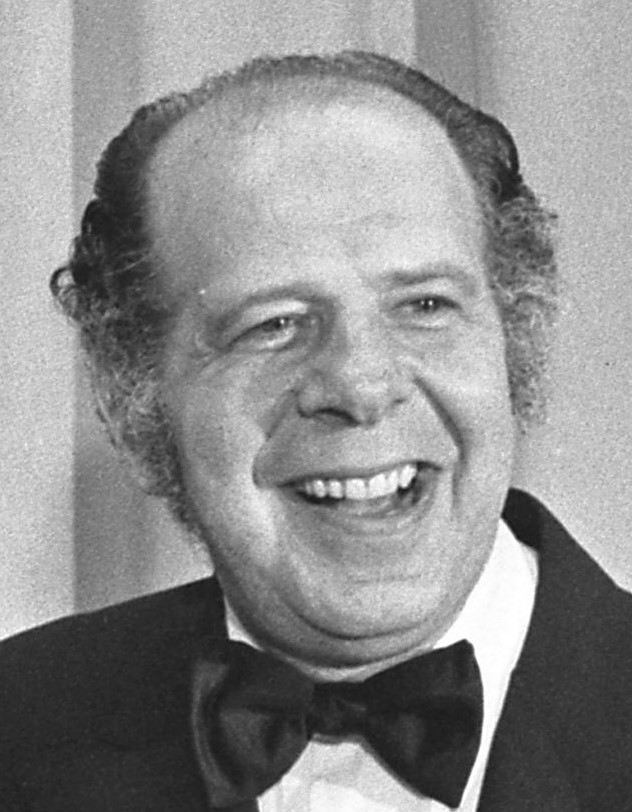
- Rich in 1973
- Born: December 19, 1918; Cleveland, Ohio, United States
- Died: May 24, 2012 (aged 93); Los Angeles, California, United States
- Education: Ohio University
- Occupations: Film and television producer
- Known for: The Waltons and Dallas producer
- Spouses: Pippa Scott (m. 1964; div. 1983) Angela Rich (before 1991)
- Children: 5
- Awards: Emmy Award

Lee Rich (December 19, 1918 – May 24, 2012) was an American film and television producer, who won the 1973 Outstanding Drama Series Emmy award for The Waltons as the producer. He is also known as the co-founder and former chairman of Lorimar Television.

Among the five Emmy nominated programs Rich produced were the series Dallas and Knots Landing.

== Early life and education ==
Rich was born in Cleveland, Ohio on December 19, 1918. His parents were Morris Richtaller and Anna Neminsky, both Jewish. His mother was born in Tetiiv, Ukraine. He earned a marketing degree from Ohio University in Athens, Ohio.

== Career ==
Rich began his career in advertising and ultimately became an industry executive.

He served in the Navy as a lieutenant in World War II, and then returned to advertising in New York, where he rose to senior vice president and a member of the board of Benton & Bowles.

As the ad agency middleman between product company sponsors and television producers, he was involved with The Andy Griffith Show, Make Room for Daddy, The Edge of Night, Gomer Pyle, U.S.M.C., and The Dick Van Dyke Show.

Rich left Benton & Bowles in 1965 to partner with the Mirisch Co. and form Mirisch-Rich Productions. There he produced The Rat Patrol.

In 1969, he, Merv Adelson, and Irwin Molasky formed Lorimar Productions. Its first production was The Homecoming: A Christmas Story (1971), a television film which led to Lorimar producing the series it inspired, The Waltons, featuring the same characters. The series ran on CBS from 1972 to 1981. Rich also co-produced the short-lived 1977 CBS espionage drama Hunter. Lorimar's biggest hit was the primetime soap Dallas, which ran from 1978 to 1991. During the Dallas storyline Who Shot J.R.? (in which Larry Hagman’s character is fired upon in the 1979-80 season finale in March and the assailant is not revealed until the following November) only Rich, executive producer Philip Capice, and writer-director Leonard Katzman knew which of three previously shot endings would be used.

After leaving Lorimar in 1986, Rich joined MGM/UA Communications. For two years he was the chairman and chief executive of MGM. After leaving MGM, he started The Lee Rich Company (aka Lee Rich Productions) with a deal at Warner Bros. for film and television production.

== Personal life ==
Rich married American actress Pippa Scott in 1964, having three children together before they divorced in 1983, though they maintained a friendship until his death. Later Rich had two other children with his second wife, Angela Rich.

== Death ==
Rich died on May 24, 2012, at the age of 93 in Los Angeles, California from lung cancer.

== Filmography ==
He was a producer in all films unless otherwise noted.

=== Film ===
Year	Film	Credit	Notes
1971	The Sporting Club		
1972	The Man		
1977	The Choirboys		
1978	Who Is Killing the Great Chefs of Europe?	Executive producer	
1990	Hard to Kill	Executive producer	
1992	Innocent Blood		
1992	Passenger 57		
1995	Just Cause		
1995	The Amazing Panda Adventure		
1996	Big Bully		
1998	Desperate Measures		
1999	Gloria		
2001	The Score		Final film as a producer

=== Television ===
Year	Title	Credit	Notes
1967	The Rat Patrol	Executive producer	
1967	Sheriff Who	Executive producer	Television film
1971	Aesop's Fables	Executive producer	Television film
1971	Do Not Fold, Spindle or Mutilate	Executive producer	Television film
1971	The Good Life	Executive producer	
1971	The Homecoming: A Christmas Story	Executive producer	Television film
1972	The Crooked Hearts	Executive producer	Television film
1972	Pursuit	Executive producer	Television film
1973	The Girls of Huntington House	Executive producer	Television film
1973	Dying Room Only	Executive producer	Television film
1973	Don't Be Afraid of the Dark	Executive producer	Television film
1973	The Blue Knight	Executive producer	Television film
1973	A Dream for Christmas	Executive producer	Television film
1973	Pomroy's People	Executive producer	Television film
1974	Police Headquarters	Executive producer	Television film
1974	The Stranger Within	Executive producer	Television film
1974	Bad Ronald	Executive producer	Television film
1974	Apple's Way	Executive producer	
1973−74	Doc Elliot	Executive producer	
1975	The Runaway Barge	Executive producer	Television film
1975	The Runaways	Executive producer	Television film
1975	Returning Home	Executive producer	Television film
1975	Eric	Executive producer	Television film
1975	Conspiracy of Terror	Executive producer	Television film
1976	Widow	Executive producer	Television film
1976	Helter Skelter	Executive producer	Television film
1976	You're Just Like Your Father	Executive producer	Television film
1975−76	The Blue Knight	Executive producer	
1977	Green Eyes	Executive producer	Television film
1977	Bravo Two	Executive producer	Television film
1977	Killer on Board	Executive producer	Television film
1977	Bunco	Executive producer	Television film
1978	A Question of Guilt	Executive producer	Television film
1978	The Wilds of Ten Thousand Islands	Executive producer	Television film
1978	The Young Pioneers	Executive producer	
1978	The Waverly Wonders	Executive producer	
1978	Desperate Women	Executive producer	Television film
1978	Long Journey Back	Executive producer	Television film
1979	Some Kind of Miracle	Executive producer	Television film
1979	Mr. Horn	Executive producer	Television film
1979	Studs Lonigan	Executive producer	
1979	Married: The First Year	Executive producer	
1979	Big Shamus, Little Shamus	Executive producer	
1979	Young Love, First Love	Executive producer	Television film
1979	Mary and Joseph: A Story of Faith	Executive producer	Television film
1979	A Man Called Intrepid	Executive producer	
1978−79	Kaz	Executive producer	
1980	Marriage Is Alive and Well	Executive producer	Television film
1980	Skag	Executive producer	
1980	The Waltons: A Decade of the Waltons	Executive producer	Television film
1980	Reward	Executive producer	Television film
1980	Willow B: Women in Prison	Executive producer	Television film
1980	Joshua's World	Executive producer	Television film
1980	A Perfect Match	Executive producer	Television film
1980	Secrets of Midland Heights	Executive producer	
1971−80	The Waltons	Co-executive producer Executive producer	
1978−80	Dallas	Executive producer	
1981	A Matter of Life and Death	Executive producer	Television film
1981	Our Family Business	Executive producer	Television film
1981	Killjoy	Executive producer	Television film
1977−81	Eight Is Enough	Executive producer	
1982	King's Crossing	Executive producer	
1982	A Wedding on Walton's Mountain	Executive producer	Television film
1982	Mother's Day on Waltons Mountain	Executive producer	Television film
1982	This Is Kate Bennett...	Executive producer	Television film
1982	Two Guys from Muck	Executive producer	Television film
1982	Two of a Kind	Executive producer	Television film
1982	A Day for Thanks on Walton's Mountain	Executive producer	Television film
1980−82	Flamingo Road	Executive producer	
1983	Dusty	Executive producer	Television film
1983	One Cooks, the Other Doesn't	Executive producer	Television film
1990	The Face of Fear	Executive producer	Television film
1993	Killer Rules	Executive producer	Television film
1993	Against the Grain	Executive producer	
1993	A Walton Thanksgiving Reunion	Executive producer	Television film
1994	Island City	Executive producer	Television film
1995	A Walton Wedding	Executive producer	Television film
1996	Dallas: J.R. Returns	Executive producer	Television film
1997	A Walton Easter	Executive producer	Television film

Production manager

Year	Title	Role	Notes
1966−67	The Rat Patrol	Executive in charge of production	
1966−67	Hey, Landlord	In charge of production	
1976	Sybil	Production supervisor	Television film

Thanks

Year	Title	Role	Notes
2012	64th Primetime Emmy Awards	In memory of	Television special
