= Falling Awake (film) =

- Directed by: Agustín Fernández
- Written by: Agustín; Michael Baez; Doug Klozzner
- Produced by: Andrew Adelson
- Starring: Andrew Cisneros; Jenna Dewan; Nestor Serrano; Nicholas Gonzalez
- Cinematography: Mark Schwartzbard
- Edited by: Michael Spence
- Music by: Kevin A. Stuart; Andrew Cisneros
- Production companies: MegaFilms; CinemaLab
- Distributed by: IFC Films
- Release date: July 24, 2009 (NYILFF)
- Running time: 110 minutes
- Country: United States
- Language: English
- Box office: $1,978 (US)

Falling Awake (originally titled Shine On) is a 2009 musical drama film directed by Agustín Fernández, who co-wrote it with Michael Baez and Doug Klozzner. Andrew Cisneros stars as a Latino musician in New York City who attempts to overcome the problems of his poor neighborhood. It premiered at the New York International Latino Film Festival and was released in the U.S. on January 29, 2010.

== Plot ==
Jay, a young Latino musician, attempts to rise above the poverty and violence in his Bronx neighborhood.

== Cast ==
- Andrew Cisneros as Jay
- Jenna Dewan as Alessandra
- Nestor Serrano as Jay's Father
- Nicholas Gonzalez as Eddie
- Julie Carmen as Angela

== Release ==
Falling Awake premiered at the New York International Latino Film Festival on July 24, 2009. IFC Films released it in the US on January 29, 2010, and it grossed $1,978.

== Reception ==
Rotten Tomatoes, a review aggregator, reports that 25% of eight surveyed critics gave the film a positive review; the average rating is 3.7/10. Metacritic rated it 24/100 based on four reviews. John Anderson of Variety wrote that it "recycles every imaginable trope". Mike Hale of The New York Times wrote that it balances "appealing performances" against the cliches of ethnic coming-of-age films. Ben Walters of The Guardian wrote although the story and characters are clichéd, the "performances are engaging, particularly Cisneros".
