= Sunrise Hospital & Medical Center =

- HCA Healthcare; Sunrise Healthcare System
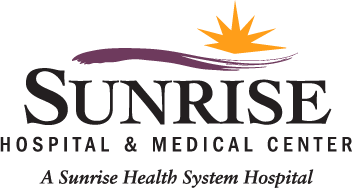

Geography
- Location: 3186 South Maryland Parkway; Winchester, Clark County, Nevada, U.S.
- Coordinates: 36.13265°N 115.13548°W

Organisation
- Care system: Private
- Type: General and Teaching
- Affiliated university: University of Nevada, Reno School of Medicine (1969–2017); UNLV School of Medicine (2017–present)
- Network: Hospital Corporation of America; Sunrise Healthcare System

Services
- Standards: Joint Commission
- Emergency department: Level II Adult Trauma Center / Level II Pediatric Trauma Center (Sunrise Children's Hospital)
- Beds: 701

Helipads
- Helipad: Yes

History
- Founded: 1958; 68 years ago

Links
- Website: https://sunrisehospital.com/

Sunrise Hospital & Medical Center is a for-profit hospital owned by the Hospital Corporation of America and operated by Sunrise Healthcare System. It is located in the Las Vegas Valley in Winchester, Nevada.

== History ==
Sunrise was founded in 1958. It was designed by architect Hugh E. Taylor and built by Las Vegas developer Irwin Molasky alongside businessmen Moe Dalitz, Allard Roen and Merv Adelson. The hospital established the area's first neonatal ICU in 1974.

Sunrise received 199 wounded patients in the aftermath of the 2017 Las Vegas shooting.

== Services ==
- Level 1 Trauma Center
- Level II Trauma center
- Member of the National Organ Transplant Network
- Level III Neonatal intensive care unit

== Accreditation ==
- Joint Commission accredited
- Inpatient rehabilitation facility accredited by the Commission on Accreditation of Rehabilitation Facilities
- Breast Center fully accredited by the National Accreditation Program for Breast Centers
