= Moe Dalitz =

American organized crime figure (1899–1989)

- Born: Morris Barney Dalitz; December 25, 1899; Boston, Massachusetts, U.S.
- Died: August 31, 1989 (aged 89); Las Vegas, Nevada, U.S.
- Other name: Mr. Las Vegas
- Occupations: Businessman, gangster, casino owner

Morris Barney Dalitz (December 25, 1899 – August 31, 1989) was an American gangster, businessman, casino owner, and philanthropist. He was one of the major figures who shaped Las Vegas in the 20th century. He was often referred to as "Mr. Las Vegas".

== Early life ==
Dalitz was born on December 25, 1899, in Boston, Massachusetts, to Jewish parents, Barnet "Bernard" Dalitz (b. May 8, 1874 in Austria) and Anna Cohen (b. October 1876 in Austria). He was raised in Michigan.

He worked in his family's laundry business early on, but began his career in bootlegging when Prohibition began in 1919, and capitalized on his access to the laundry trucks in the family business. Additionally, he developed a partnership with the Maceo syndicate which ran Galveston and supplied liquor from Canada and Mexico. Though he admitted under oath that he had been a bootlegger and had operated illegal gambling houses, Dalitz was never convicted of a crime. During Senator Estes Kefauver's committee hearings investigating organized crime, when questioned about his bootlegging, Dalitz said: "If you people wouldn't have drunk it, I wouldn't have bootlegged it."

In May 1929 he attended the historic Atlantic City Conference, believed to be the first ever national summit of the American mafia. With the repeal of Prohibition in 1933, Dalitz turned to gambling and operated illegal but protected casinos in Steubenville, Ohio, and Covington, Kentucky. For part of its ten-year run, Dalitz ran The Pettibone Club, an illegal gambling hall that operated in far southwest Geauga County, Ohio (on Pettibone Road east of Solon) from 1939 to 1949. He enlisted in the Army in World War II on June 25, 1942, and rose in rank from private to first lieutenant. He was discharged on May 29, 1945.

== Career ==
His investment in Las Vegas began in the late 1940s with the Desert Inn. When the original builder of the resort Wilbur Clark ran out of money, Dalitz led a group of investors that became partners in the hotel-casino. When the Desert Inn opened in 1950, it was the largest employer in Nevada. Clark was the public face of the resort, with Dalitz and a team of others as licensed co-owners and operators of the resort. Dalitz and the Desert Inn team opened the Stardust Resort & Casino in 1958. The last casino that Dalitz owned was the Sundance, opened in 1980.

With Allard Roen, Irwin Molasky and Merv Adelson, he founded Paradise Development, a real estate development company in the 1950s. The partners founded the Sunrise Hospital, The Boulevard Mall and the Las Vegas Country Club. Later, they co-founded the La Costa Resort and Spa in Carlsbad, California. Dalitz was a part-owner in the Hotel Nacional in Havana, Cuba. He had attended the mob's Havana Conference in 1946.

In a 1983 interview, Dalitz said he considered construction of the Las Vegas Convention Center to be his greatest achievement. "Las Vegas used to be just a gambling town. Now we are a resort destination. The Convention Center complements our purpose," he said.

== Philanthropy ==
In 1982, Dalitz received the "Torch of Liberty" award from the Anti-Defamation League. It was presented by comedian Joan Rivers.

== Personal life ==
Dalitz was married to Averill Dalitz; the couple had one daughter, Suzanne. They lived in Las Vegas. Averill and Suzanne later lived in New York, Mexico, and Switzerland. His first marriage was to Edna Louise Keating whom he married March 23, 1922 in Indiana, and after that to Toni Clark, whom he married December 8, 1945 in Dade County, Florida. In 1946, they had a son, Andrew B. Dalitz; he died in 1972. Dalitz married Averill Knigge in the early 1950s, and they lived together in a home at the Desert Inn Hotel in Las Vegas, they had a daughter Suzanne Dalitz in May, 1957. They divorced in 1965. Moe Dalitz lived with Barbara Schick until Schick's death in 1986. Suzanne Dalitz is mother to three of Moe's grandchildren: Christopher Brown (born 1985), Chelsea Brown (born 1988), and Noah Gollin (born 1996).

== Death ==
Moe Dalitz died at 2:00 a.m. PST on August 31, 1989. He had been seriously ill since 1986. Death was attributed to congestive heart failure, chronic hypertension, and kidney failure. He also suffered from failing eyesight. Services were held September 5, 1989 at Congregation Ner Tamid.
