= Irwin Molasky =

American businessman (1927–2020)

- Born: February 22, 1927; St. Louis, Missouri, U.S.
- Died: July 4, 2020 (aged 93)
- Occupations: Real estate developer, philanthropist
- Spouse(s): Pepie (Bookbinder) Molasky (divorced); Susan (Frey) Molasky
- Children: 4

Irwin Molasky (February 22, 1927 – July 4, 2020) was an American real estate developer and philanthropist from Las Vegas, Nevada. He was the Chairman of The Molasky Group of Companies.

== Early life ==
Irwin Molasky was born to a Jewish family on February 22, 1927 in St. Louis, Missouri. Molasky moved with his family to Dayton, Ohio. He served in the United States Military after World War II. His father ran an Ohio newspaper distribution business and managed several apartments. Molasky went to a military high school and attended college and worked during summers as a teenager. He attended Ohio State University and transferred to the University of California, Los Angeles (UCLA), but did not graduate from either institution. Instead, he worked his way up in construction.

== Real estate development ==
Molasky moved to Las Vegas, Nevada in 1951. Soon after arriving he bought property and built an 18-room motel, The Pyramids. With Moe Dalitz, Allard Roen and Merv Adelson, he founded Paradise Development, a real estate development company in the 1950s. Together, they founded the Sunrise Hospital, the Boulevard Mall and the Las Vegas Country Club. Later, they also developed the La Costa Resort and Spa in Carlsbad, California.

Meanwhile, Molasky became the Chairman of The Molasky Group of Companies, a real estate development company. He has built the first master-planned community, Paradise Palms and the first high-rise office building in Las Vegas, the 17-story Bank of American Plaza; and the Nathan Adelson Hospice. Additionally, he helped find the right location for the McCarran International Airport and assisted with the land purchase for the Las Vegas Convention Center. Moreover, he built the Internal Revenue Service Headquarters in Las Vegas, the Social Security Administration building in Las Vegas, the Casa Grande Re-entry Facility for the State of Nevada Department of Corrections, and the Clark County Detention Facility. Molasky also purchased the Regency Towers high-rise condominium tower after it went into foreclosure in the 1970s. Molasky and Steve Wynn later built the Park Towers high-rise condominiums, completed in 2001. In 2007, his company completed the Molasky Corporate Center in downtown Las Vegas. It is a green building used for office space, and is the only building by Molasky to use his name.

== Television production ==
With Merv Adelson and Lee Rich, he was a co-founder of Lorimar Productions, a conglomerate of television, broadcasting, and print companies. He also served on its board of directors.

Molasky admitted in an interview with The Hollywood Reporter that he used the company as a "tax shelter."

== Equestrianism ==
Molasky owned racehorses with trainer Bruce Headley. One of his horses was Kona Gold.

== Philanthropy ==
Molasky was a key figure in the development of the University of Nevada, Las Vegas through a donation of 45 acres (18 ha) of prime land at Flamingo Road and Maryland Parkway. He also served as the Founding Chairman of the UNLV Foundation, the fundraising arm of the university.

Molasky served on the board of directors of Project REAL, a non-profit organization that teaches "principles of democracy, law and the responsibilities of citizenship" to schoolchildren in Las Vegas.

The Molasky Junior High School in Las Vegas is named in his honor. Molasky was one of the founders of the Jewish Federation of Las Vegas.

== Personal life and death ==
Molasky was married to Pepie (Bookbinder) Molasky. He then married Susan (Frey) Molasky. He has three sons and a daughter, all of whom work at The Molasky Group of Companies.

In 1998, Irwin & Susan Molasky Junior High School, a middle school in Las Vegas, opened in his and his second wife’s honor.

Molasky died of natural causes on July 4, 2020, at the age of 93.
