= Andrew Adelson =

American television producer

- Born: July 28, 1954 (age 71); Los Angeles, California, U.S.
- Occupation(s): Director of Fowler Museum, UCLA. Ph.D specializing in African Art History
- Spouse: Marla Adelson Berns
- Children: 2
- Father: Merv Adelson
- Relatives: Gary Adelson (brother)

Andrew Adelson (born July 28, 1954) is an American television producer.

== Biography ==
Adelson is the son Lori (née Kaufman) and Merv Adelson. He has one sister and a brother: Ellen Adelson Ross and Gary Adelson.

== Filmography ==
- Blood & Orchids 1986 (producer)
- I Know My First Name Is Steven 1989 (executive producer)
- Desperate for Love 1989 (executive producer)
- Fugitive Among Us 1991 - 1992 (executive producer)
- Desperate Choices: To Save My Child 1992 (executive producer)
- Kiss of a Killer 1993 (executive producer)
- The Amy Fisher Story 1993 (executive producer)
- Out of Darkness 1994 (executive producer)
- Barbara Taylor Bradford's Everything to Gain 1996 - 1997 (executive producer)
- Barbara Taylor Bradford's Love in Another Town 1997 - 1998 (executive producer)
- Barbara Taylor Bradford's Her Own Rules 1998 - 1999 (executive producer)
- Thanks of a Grateful Nation 1998 (executive producer)
- Barbara Taylor Bradford's A Secret Affair 1999 - 2000 (executive producer)
- The Hunley 1999 (executive producer)
- A Glimpse of Hell 2001 (executive producer)
- We Were the Mulvaneys 2002 (executive producer)
- Sex and Breakfast 2007 (producer)
- Falling Awake 2010 (producer)
- An Inconvenient Woman (executive producer)
- Critical Choices (executive producer)
- Hiroshima (executive producer)
- Nora Roberts' Sanctuary (executive producer)
- Power and Beauty (executive producer)
- Warm Hearts, Cold Feet (executive producer)
