= Las Vegas Country Club =

American private membership club

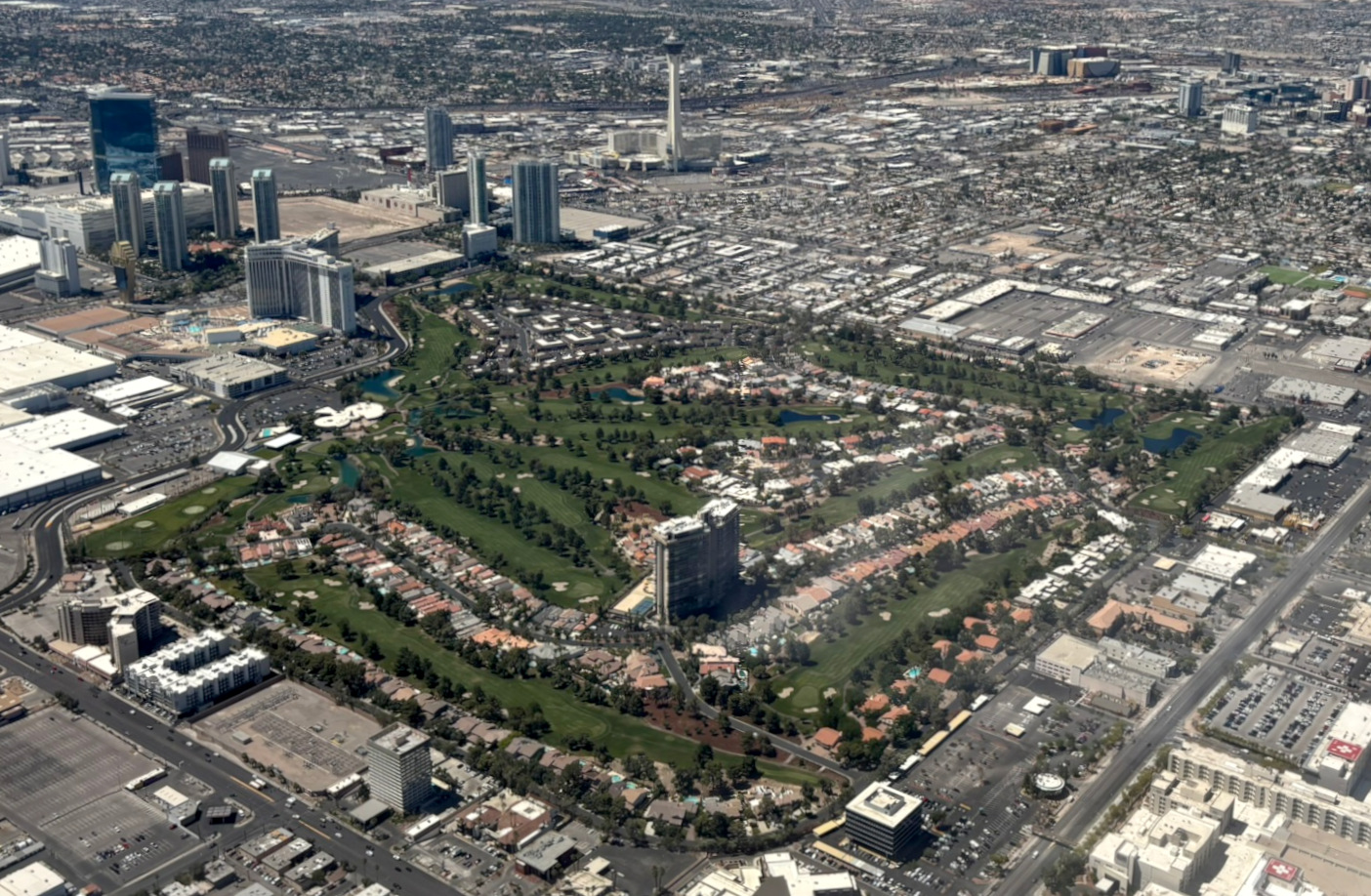
- Aerial view of the Las Vegas Country Club

- Location of LVCC on the Las Vegas strip
- 36.135605°N 115.144809°W

Club information
- Location: Winchester, Nevada
- Established: 1967
- Type: Private
- Owner: Samick Music Company
- Tota holes: 18
- Tournaments: Las Vegas Invitational (1983-1991); LPGA Takefuji Classic (2003-2006); LIV Golf Las Vegas (2024-)
- Greens: Bent grass
- Fairways: Bermuda grass
- Website: Official website

Black
- Length: 7,203 yd (6,586 m)
- Course rating: 74.7
- Slope rating: 125

Gold
- Length: 6,753 yd (6,175 m)
- Course rating: 72.6
- Slope rating: 121

Silver
- Length: 6,246 yd (5,711 m)
- Course rating: 70.8
- Slope rating: 118

Bronze
- Length: 5,524 yd (5,051 m)
- Course rating: 71.5
- Slope rating: 123

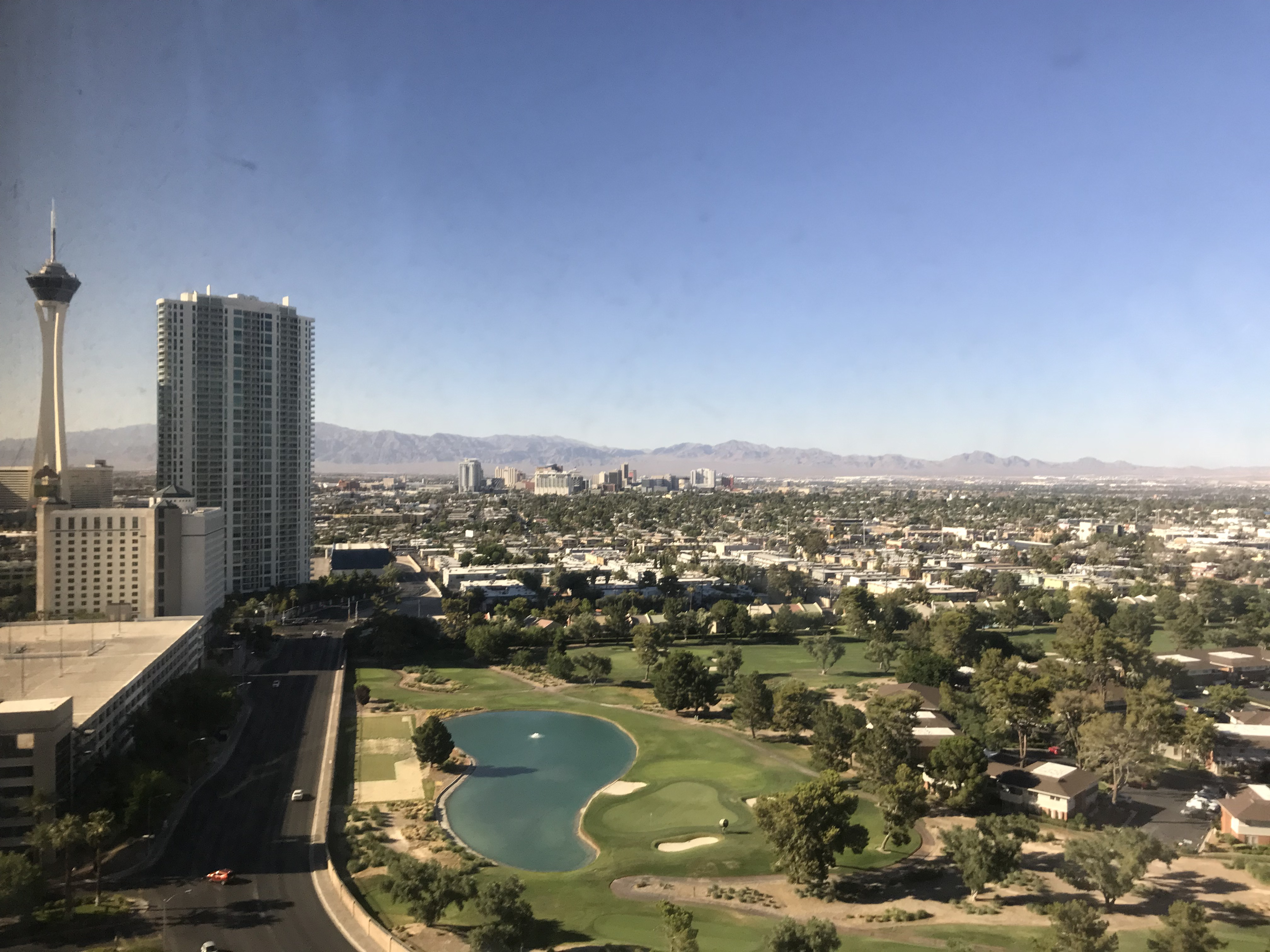
The view of the green from Westgate Las Vegas with The Strat Hotel & Casino & Tower in the background.

The Las Vegas Country Club is a private membership club located in the Winchester area of metropolitan Las Vegas, Nevada.

== History ==
It was built on the site of a 1950s horse and automobile racetrack named Las Vegas Park and later the Las Vegas Park Speedway. It was developed by businessmen Moe Dalitz, Allard Roen, Irwin Molasky and Merv Adelson.

The 18-hole golf course was completed in the fall of 1967, followed by the completion of a 44,000-square-foot (4,100 m^{2}) clubhouse in April 1968. The clubhouse architect was Julian Gabrielle; the golf course designer was Edmond B. Ault. Amenities include two pitching and chipping greens, a 9,500-square-foot (880 m^{2}) putting green, Indoor and outdoor tennis courts, racquetball, swimming pool and a complete exercise facility.

The club served as the host for the Las Vegas Invitational golf tournament between 1983 and 1991, and also hosted events on a rotational basis from 1992 to 1995. The club also hosted the LPGA Takefuji Classic on the LPGA Tour from 2003 to 2006.

The club was sold in 2018 to Samick Music Corp.
