= Merv Adelson =

American TV producer (1929–2015)

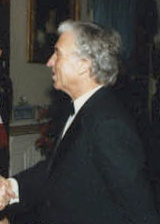
- Adelson in 1985
- Born: Mervyn Lee Adelson; October 23, 1929; Los Angeles, California, U.S.
- Died: September 8, 2015 (aged 85); Los Angeles, California, U.S.
- Occupations: real estate developer; television producer
- Years active: 1950–2015
- Known for: Co-founder of Lorimar Television
- Spouses: Lori Kaufman (divorced) Gail Kenaston (divorced) Barbara Walters (m. 1981; div. 1984) (m. 1986; div. 1992) Thea Nesis (divorced)
- Children: 5, including Andrew and Gary

Mervyn Lee Adelson (October 23, 1929 – September 8, 2015) was an American real estate developer and television producer who co-founded Lorimar Television.

== Early life ==
Adelson was born to a Russian-Jewish family in Los Angeles on October 23, 1929, to Nathan and Pearl Adelson (née Swartz). His parents were the children of Jewish immigrants from Russia who had settled in Nebraska. When he was a child, he worked in a grocery store run by his family.

== Career ==
In the 1950s, Adelson established himself in Las Vegas, where he first met Irwin Molasky and Moe Dalitz. The trio were responsible for building the Las Vegas Country Club as well as what became Sunrise Hospital and Medical Center. Molasky and Adelson later opened Omni La Costa Resort and Spa in 1965. Adelson soon left the real estate industry and co-founded Lorimar Television with Molasky and Lee Rich in 1969.

== Personal life and death ==
Adelson was married and subsequently divorced four times. His first wife was Lori Kaufman, with whom he had a daughter and two sons: Ellen Adelson Ross, Andrew Adelson, and Gary Adelson. His second wife was Gail Kenaston, the adopted daughter of silent film star Billie Dove. His third wife was television journalist Barbara Walters, whom he married from 1986 to 1992. They met on a blind date in 1984. His fourth wife was Thea Nesis, with whom he had adopted two daughters, Lexi and Ava Nesis. All his marriages ended in divorce.

Adelson died in Los Angeles on September 8, 2015, from cancer, aged 85.
