= List of accolades received by Mad TV =

Mad TV awards and nominations
Awards and nominations
Award	Wins	Nominations

Totals (Note: Certain award groups do not simply award one winner. They acknowledge several different recipients, have runners-up, and have third place. Since this is a specific recognition and is different from losing an award, runner-up mentions are considered wins in this award tally. For simplification and to avoid errors, each award in this list has been presumed to have had a prior nomination.)
- Wins: 13
- Nominations: 82

Mad TV is an American sketch comedy series that aired from October 14, 1995 to May 16, 2009, then from July 26, 2016 to September 27, 2016. It won five Primetime Emmy Awards out of 43 nominations, all of which were for technical work. The show also won five Make-Up Artists and Hair Stylists Guild Awards and three ADG Excellence in Production Design Awards.

== Awards and nominations ==
Awards and nominations received by The Flash
Award	Year	Episode	Category	Nominee(s)	Result	Ref(s)
ADG Excellence in Production Design Awards	2001	"Mad TV Live and Almost Legal"	Television - Variety or Awards Show, Music Special or Documentary	Jeff Hall	Nominated	
ADG Excellence in Production Design Awards	2002	718	Television - Variety or Awards Show, Music Special or Documentary	John Sabato, D. Martyn Bookwalter, Dan Morski	Nominated	
ADG Excellence in Production Design Awards	2004	—	Television - Variety or Awards Show, Music Special or Documentary	John Sabato, D. Martyn Bookwalter, Dan Morski	Nominated	
ADG Excellence in Production Design Awards	2005	1106	Television - Episode of a Multi-Camera Television Series	John Sabato, D. Martyn Bookwalter, Nicole Elespuru	Won	
ADG Excellence in Production Design Awards	2006	1207	Television - Episode of a Multi-Camera Television Series	John Sabato, D. Martyn Bookwalter, Nicole Elespuru	Won	
ADG Excellence in Production Design Awards	2007	1221	Television - Episode of a Multi-Camera Television Series	John Sabato, D. Martyn Bookwalter, Nicole Elespuru	Won	
ALMA Awards	2008	—	Outstanding Female Performance in a Comedy Television Series	Anjelah Johnson	Nominated	
ALMA Awards	2008	—	Outstanding Male Performance in a Comedy Television Series	Johnny A. Sanchez	Nominated	
BET Comedy Awards	2004	—	Outstanding Comedy Variety Series	—	Nominated	
BMI Film & TV Awards	2007	—	BMI TV Music Award	Greg O'Connor	Nominated	
Canadian Comedy Awards	2001	—	Television – Pretty Funny Male Performance	Ron Pederson	Nominated	
Canadian Comedy Awards	2001	—	Television – Pretty Funny Male Performance	Will Sasso	Nominated	
Make-Up Artists and Hair Stylists Guild Awards	2000	507	Best Character Makeup for a Single Episode of a Regular Series - Sitcom, Drama or Daytime	Jennifer Aspinall, Felicia Linsky, Ed French	Won	
Make-Up Artists and Hair Stylists Guild Awards	2000	505	Best Character Makeup for a Single Episode of a Regular Series - Sitcom, Drama or Daytime	Jennifer Aspinall, Felicia Linsky, Ed French	Nominated	
Make-Up Artists and Hair Stylists Guild Awards	2000	505	Best Innovative Hair Styling for a Single Episode of a Regular Series - Sitcom, Drama or Daytime	Dugg Kirkpatrick	Nominated	
Make-Up Artists and Hair Stylists Guild Awards	2000	511	Best Character Hair Styling for a Single Episode of a Regular Series - Sitcom, Drama or Daytime	Dugg Kirkpatrick, Judith Tiedemann	Nominated	
Make-Up Artists and Hair Stylists Guild Awards	2000	"Who Wants to Be a Millionaire"	Best Character Hair Styling for a Single Episode of a Regular Series - Sitcom, Drama or Daytime	Judith Tiedemann, Dugg Kirkpatrick, Chriss Curry	Nominated	
Make-Up Artists and Hair Stylists Guild Awards	2001	"7th Season Premiere"	Best Character Hair Styling for a Television Series	Matthew Kasten, Mishell Chandler, Rod Ortega, Desmond Miller	Nominated	
Make-Up Artists and Hair Stylists Guild Awards	2001	616	Best Contemporary Hair Styling for a Television Series	Matthew Kasten, Mishell Chandler, Rod Ortega, Desmond Miller	Nominated	
Make-Up Artists and Hair Stylists Guild Awards	2001	707	Best Special Makeup Effects for a Television Series	Jennifer Aspinall, Randy Westgate	Won	
Make-Up Artists and Hair Stylists Guild Awards	2001	707	Best Character Makeup for a Television Series	Jennifer Aspinall, Randy Westgate	Won	
Make-Up Artists and Hair Stylists Guild Awards	2002	—	Best Character Makeup for a Television Series	Jennifer Aspinall, Scott Wheeler, Randy Westgate	Won	
Make-Up Artists and Hair Stylists Guild Awards	2002	—	Best Special Makeup Effects for a Television Series	Jennifer Aspinall, Scott Wheeler, Randy Westgate, Julie Purcell, Natalie Fratti, David Williams	Nominated	
Make-Up Artists and Hair Stylists Guild Awards	2002	—	Best Character Hairstyling for a Television Series	Matthew Kasten, Mishell Chandler, K. Troy Zestos	Nominated	
Make-Up Artists and Hair Stylists Guild Awards	2003	—	Best Character Hairstyling for a Television Series	Matthew Kasten, Mishell Chandler, K. Troy Zestos	Nominated	
Make-Up Artists and Hair Stylists Guild Awards	2003	—	Best Character Makeup for a Television Series	Jennifer Aspinall, Scott Wheeler, Randy Westgate	Won	
Make-Up Artists and Hair Stylists Guild Awards	2003	—	Best Special Makeup Effects for a Television Series	Jennifer Aspinall, Scott Wheeler, Randy Westgate, Julie Purcell, Nathalie Fratti, David Williams	Nominated	
Make-Up Artists and Hair Stylists Guild Awards	2004	—	Best Character Hair Styling for a Television Series	Matthew Kasten, Mishell Chandler, Marc Boyle	Nominated	
Make-Up Artists and Hair Stylists Guild Awards	2004	—	Best Character Makeup for a Television Series	Jennifer Aspinall, Scott Wheeler, Randy Westgate, David Williams	Nominated	
Make-Up Artists and Hair Stylists Guild Awards	2004	—	Best Special Makeup Effects for a Television Series	Jennifer Aspinall, Scott Wheeler, Randy Westgate, David Williams	Nominated	
NAACP Image Awards	2001	—	Outstanding Variety – Series or Special	—	Nominated	
Primetime Emmy Awards	1999	402	Outstanding Costume Design for a Variety or Music Program	Wendy Benbrook	Nominated	
Primetime Emmy Awards	1999	402	Outstanding Hairstyling for a Series	Matthew Kasten	Nominated	
Primetime Emmy Awards	2000	511	Outstanding Art Direction for a Variety or Music Program	John Sabato, D. Martyn Bookwalter, and Daryn-Reid Goodall	Nominated	
Primetime Emmy Awards	2000	"Movie Show"	Outstanding Makeup for a Series	Jennifer Aspinall, Susan Cabral-Ebert, Courtney Carell, Ed French, Felicia Linsky, Myke Michaels, Julie Purcell, R. Stephen Weber, Randy Westgate	Nominated	
Primetime Emmy Awards	2000	"Movie Show"	Outstanding Hairstyling for a Series	Ken Beck, Christine Curry, Danny Goldstein, Virginia Grobeson, Matthew Kasten, Dugg Kirkpatrick, Bryn Leetch, Judith Tiedemann	Nominated	
Primetime Emmy Awards	2000	"Movie Show"	Outstanding Costumes for a Variety or Music Program	Wendy Benbrook, Frances Hays	Nominated	
Primetime Emmy Awards	2001	615	Outstanding Costumes for a Variety or Music Program	Wendy Benbrook and Wanda Leavey	Nominated	
Primetime Emmy Awards	2001	601	Outstanding Hairstyling for a Series	Matthew Kasten, Mishell Chandler, Desmond Miller, Rod Ortega, Mimi Jafari, and Fabrizio Sanges	Won	
Primetime Emmy Awards	2001	610	Outstanding Art Direction for a Variety or Music Program	John Sabato, D. Martyn Bookwalter, Cecele Destefano, and Daryn-Reid Goodall	Nominated	
Primetime Emmy Awards	2001	—	Outstanding Main Title Design	Steve Kirklys and Adam Byrd	Nominated	
Primetime Emmy Awards	2001	"MADtv's 2nd Annual Salute to the Movies"	Outstanding Makeup for a Series	Jennifer Aspinall, Felicia Linsky, Ed French, Myke Michaels, Randy Westgate, R. Stephen Weber, Susan A. Cabral, Courtney Carell, Julie Purcell	Nominated	
Primetime Emmy Awards	2002	"MADtv's 3rd Annual Salute to the Movies"	Outstanding Art Direction for a Variety or Music Program	John Sabato, D. Martyn Bookwalter, Daryn Reid Goodall	Nominated	
Primetime Emmy Awards	2002	701	Outstanding Choreography	Monie Adamson	Nominated	
Primetime Emmy Awards	2002	701	Outstanding Makeup for a Series (Non-Prosthetic)	Jennifer Aspinall, Randy Westgate, Julie Purcell, Scott Wheeler, Stephanie L. Massie, Felicia Linsky, and Darrell McIntyre	Nominated	
Primetime Emmy Awards	2002	"MADtv's Holiday Spectacular"	Outstanding Costumes for a Variety or Music Program	Wendy Benbrook and Wanda Leavey	Nominated	
Primetime Emmy Awards	2003	801	Outstanding Makeup for a Series (Non-Prosthetic)	Jennifer Aspinall, Scott Wheeler, Randy Westgate, James Rohland, and Julie Purcell	Nominated	
Primetime Emmy Awards	2003	806	Outstanding Makeup for a Series (Prosthetic)	Jennifer Aspinall, Scott Wheeler, Randy Westgate, Nathalie Fratti, David Williams	Nominated	
Primetime Emmy Awards	2003	806	Outstanding Hairstyling for a Series	Matthew Kaste, Mishell Chandler, K. Troy Zestos, and Stacey Bergman	Nominated	
Primetime Emmy Awards	2003	806	Outstanding Art Direction for a Variety or Music Program	John Sabato, D. Martyn Bookwalter, and Daryn-Reid Goodall	Nominated	
Primetime Emmy Awards	2003	809	Outstanding Costumes for a Variety or Music Program	Wendy Benbrook and Wanda Leavey	Nominated	
Primetime Emmy Awards	2004	"200th Episode"	Outstanding Art Direction for a Variety, Music Program, or Special	John Sabato, D. Martyn Bookwalter, and Daryn-Reid Goodall	Nominated	
Primetime Emmy Awards	2004	"200th Episode"	Outstanding Hairstyling for a Series	Matthew Kasten, Mishell Chandler, Desmond Miller, and Anthea Grutsis	Nominated	
Primetime Emmy Awards	2004	925	Outstanding Choreography	Monie Adamson	Nominated	
Primetime Emmy Awards	2005	1004	Outstanding Makeup for a Series (Non-Prosthetic)	Jennifer Aspinall, Scott Wheeler, Randy Westgate, and Nathalie Fratti	Nominated	
Primetime Emmy Awards	2005	1006	Outstanding Art Direction for a Variety, Music Program, or Special	John Sabato, D. Martyn Bookwalter, and Daryn-Reid Goodall	Nominated	
Primetime Emmy Awards	2005	1013	Outstanding Prosthetic Makeup for a Series, Miniseries, Movie, or Special	Jennifer Aspinall, Scott Wheeler, Randy Westgate, and James Rohland	Nominated	
Primetime Emmy Awards	2005	1017	Outstanding Costumes for a Variety or Music Program	Wendy Benbrook and Wanda Leave	Won	
Primetime Emmy Awards	2005	1017	Outstanding Hairstyling for a Series	Matthew Kasten, Anthea Grutsis, Desmond Miller, and Raissa Patton	Nominated	
Primetime Emmy Awards	2005	1023	Outstanding Choreography	Monie Adamson	Nominated	
Primetime Emmy Awards	2006	1109	Outstanding Makeup for a Series (Non-Prosthetic)	Jennifer Aspinall, Nathalie Fratti, Heather Mages, and David Williams	Nominated	
Primetime Emmy Awards	2006	1109	Outstanding Costumes for a Variety or Music Program	Wendy Benbrook and Wanda Leavey	Won	
Primetime Emmy Awards	2006	1111	Outstanding Original Music and Lyrics	Greg O'Connor and Jim Wise (for "A Wonderfully Normal Day")	Won	
Primetime Emmy Awards	2006	1115	Outstanding Art Direction for a Variety, Music Program, or Special	John Sabato, D. Martyn Bookwalter, and Daryn-Reid Goodall	Nominated	
Primetime Emmy Awards	2006	1117	Outstanding Prosthetic Makeup For a Series, Miniseries, Movie or Special	Jennifer Aspinall, Heather Mages, Wade Daily, Douglas Noe, James Rohland, David Williams	Nominated	
Primetime Emmy Awards	2007	1209	Outstanding Original Music and Lyrics	Greg O'Connor, Bruce McCoy, and Jim Wise (for "Merry X-Mas")	Nominated	
Primetime Emmy Awards	2007	1209	Outstanding Art Direction for a Variety, Music, or Nonfiction Programming	John Sabato, D. Martyn Bookwalter, and Daryn-Reid Goodall	Nominated	
Primetime Emmy Awards	2007	1210	Outstanding Makeup for a Series (Non-Prosthetic)	Jennifer Aspinall, Heather Mages, James Rohland, David Williams	Nominated	
Primetime Emmy Awards	2008	1305	Outstanding Original Music and Lyrics	Greg O'Connor, Jordan Peele, and Jim Wise (for "Sad Fitty Cent")	Nominated	
Primetime Emmy Awards	2008	1308	Outstanding Makeup for a Multi-Camera Series or Special (Non-Prosthetic)	Jennifer Aspinall, Heather Mages, Chris Burgoyne, and Ned Neidhardt	Nominated	
Primetime Emmy Awards	2008	1315	Outstanding Art Direction for Variety, Music, or Nonfiction Programming	Nicole Elespuru, James Yarnell, and Daryn-Reid Goodall	Nominated	
Primetime Emmy Awards	2009	1405	Outstanding Makeup for a Multi-Camera Series or Special (Non-Prosthetic)	Jennifer Aspinall, Alexei O'Brien, David Williams, and Heather Mages	Won	
Primetime Emmy Awards	2009	1412	Outstanding Hairstyling for a Multi-Camera Series or Special	Matthew Kasten, Wendy Southard, Desiree Dizard, and Desmond Miller	Nominated	
Primetime Emmy Awards	2017	1504	Outstanding Makeup for a Multi-Camera Series or Special (Non-Prosthetic)	Jennifer Aspinall, Scott G. Wheeler, David Williams, James Rohland, and Ned Niedhardt	Nominated	
Teen Choice Awards	2003	—	Choice TV Late Night	—	Nominated	
Teen Choice Awards	2004	—	Choice TV Late Night	—	Nominated	
Writers Guild of America Awards	2003	—	Comedy/Variety (Including Talk) – Series	—	Nominated	
Writers Guild of America Awards	2004	—	Comedy/Variety (Including Talk) – Series	—	Nominated	
Writers Guild of America Awards	2005	—	Comedy/Variety (Including Talk) – Series	—	Nominated	
Young Artist Awards	2002	707	Best Performance in a TV Comedy Series: Guest Starring Young Actress	Michelle Trachtenberg	Nominated	
