= John R. Montgomery =

American television producer

- Born: John R. Montgomery IV
- Education: New Trier High School; Drake University (BA)
- Occupations: Television producer; advertising executive; businessman
- Parent(s): John R. Montgomery III; DeeDee Smart Montgomery

John R. Montgomery IV is an American television producer and advertising industry professional. He is the Founder and President of Montgomery Studios, a content creation studio with an emphasis on television development and production. Montgomery's Executive Producer credits include Superior Donuts (CBS), MADtv (CW), Attention Deficit Theater (CW Seed) and The Crazy Ones (CBS). For The Crazy Ones, Montgomery was also credited: "Suggested by the Experiences of" as the series was based in part on Montgomery's 33-year career at the Leo Burnett advertising agency in Chicago. Show creator David E. Kelley cited Montgomery as the inspiration for The Crazy Ones and character Simon Roberts, portrayed by Robin Williams.

== Early life and education ==
Montgomery grew up in Chicago, Illinois, born to John R. Montgomery III and DeeDee Smart Montgomery. He attended New Trier High School in Winnetka, Illinois. Later, he graduated from Drake University in Des Moines, Iowa, with a B.A. in English.

== Advertising career ==
Montgomery worked at Burnett for 33 years, as Executive Vice President, Executive Creative Director and handled accounts including McDonald's (domestic and global), Minute Maid (Coca-Cola), Nintendo, Kellogg, Procter & Gamble, Allstate, 7-Up, Keebler, Green Giant, Miller Beers, United Airlines, Kraft Foods, Nestle and Samsonite.

Montgomery is credited as the author of three books that were distributed with McDonald's Happy Meals in 2013 and 2014.

== The Crazy Ones ==
Montgomery's advertising career was the inspiration for the show and character Simon Roberts, portrayed by Robin Williams. Montgomery worked with the writers several days a week and many of the stories featured on the show were based on his experiences in the advertising world. In episode 102, titled "The Spectacular", a stunt with a giant coffee cup goes awry when the coffee begins to rain down on the nearby crowd was based on his experience. "We had a spectacular in New York that had a coffee-related disaster. We had forgotten to factor for wind when we floated a coffee pot above a billboard." In addition, the awards in Simon's office that served as props were real awards of Montgomery's.
