= The Crazy Ones =

American television sitcom (2013–2014)

- Genre: Sitcom
- Created by: David E. Kelley
- Starring: Robin Williams; Sarah Michelle Gellar; James Wolk; Hamish Linklater; Amanda Setton
- Composers: Erica Weis; Orr Rebhun
- Country of origin: United States
- Original language: English
- No. of seasons: 1
- No. of episodes: 22

Production
- Executive producers: David E. Kelley; Bill D'Elia; Dean Lorey; Jason Winer; John R. Montgomery; Mark Teitelbaum; Mark Pedowitz; Tracy Poust; Jon Kinnally
- Camera setup: Single-camera
- Running time: 22–24 minutes
- Production companies: David E. Kelley Productions; 20th Century Fox Television

Original release
- Network: CBS
- Release: September 26, 2013 – April 17, 2014

The Crazy Ones is an American television sitcom created by David E. Kelley, and starring Robin Williams and Sarah Michelle Gellar. The single-camera series aired for one season on CBS, from September 26, 2013, to April 17, 2014. It was part of the 2013–14 American television season as a Thursday night 9:00 pm Eastern / 8:00 pm Central entry. Bill D'Elia, Dean Lorey and Jason Winer served as executive producers for 20th Century Fox Television. The episodes are loosely based on the life experiences of John R. Montgomery while he worked at Leo Burnett Advertising in Chicago.

On October 18, 2013, CBS gave the show a full-season order. On February 27, 2014, the series switched timeslots with Two and a Half Men, and started airing at 9:30 pm Eastern / 8:30 pm Central. CBS canceled the series on May 10, 2014, marking Williams's final television role, nearly three months before his death in 2014.

== Cast and characters ==
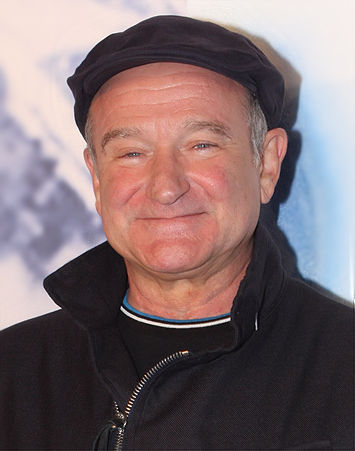
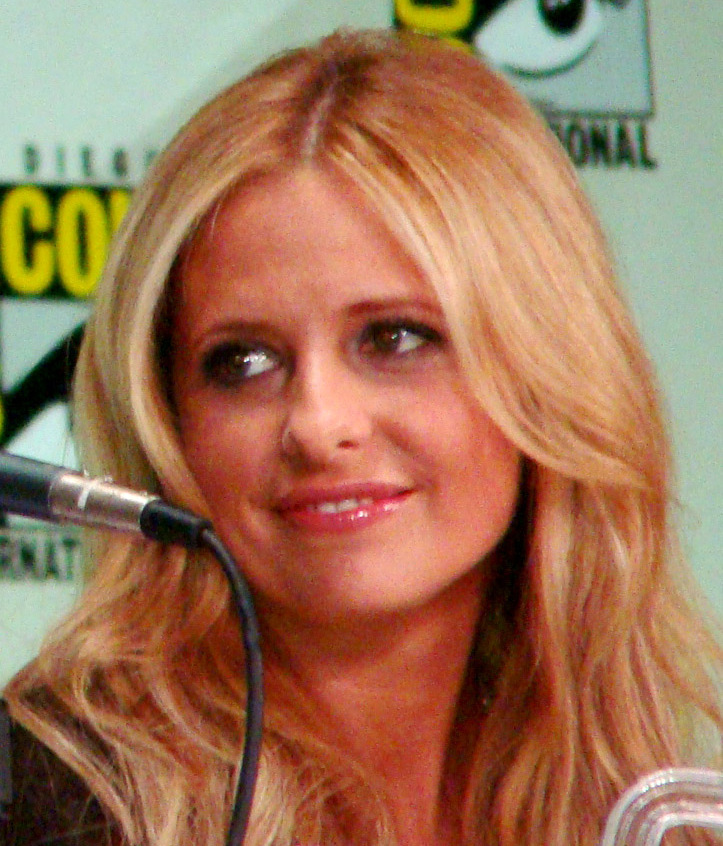
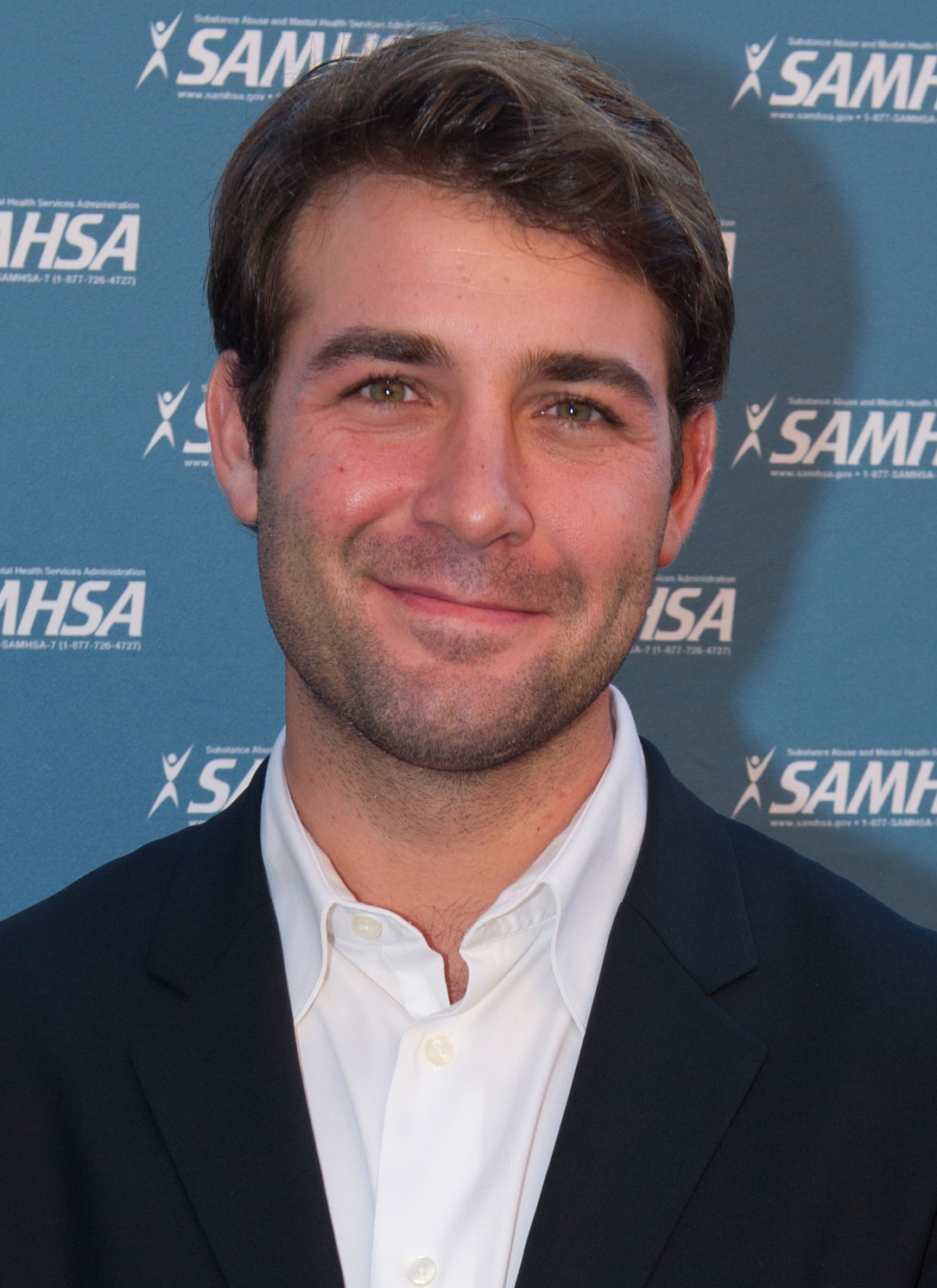
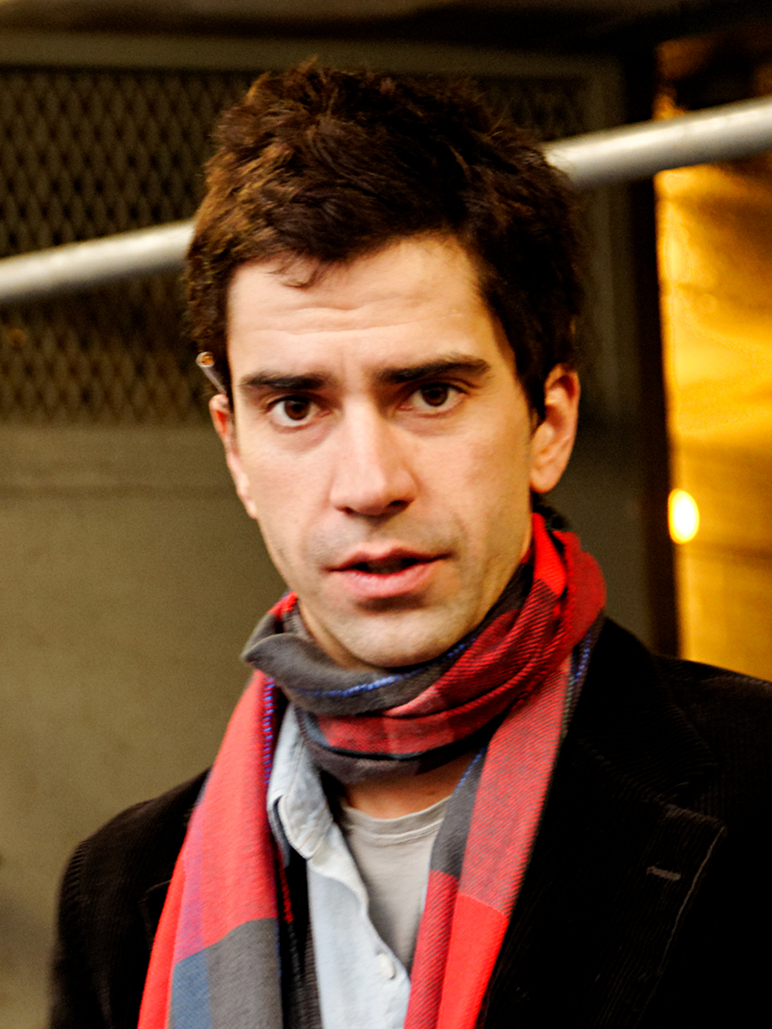
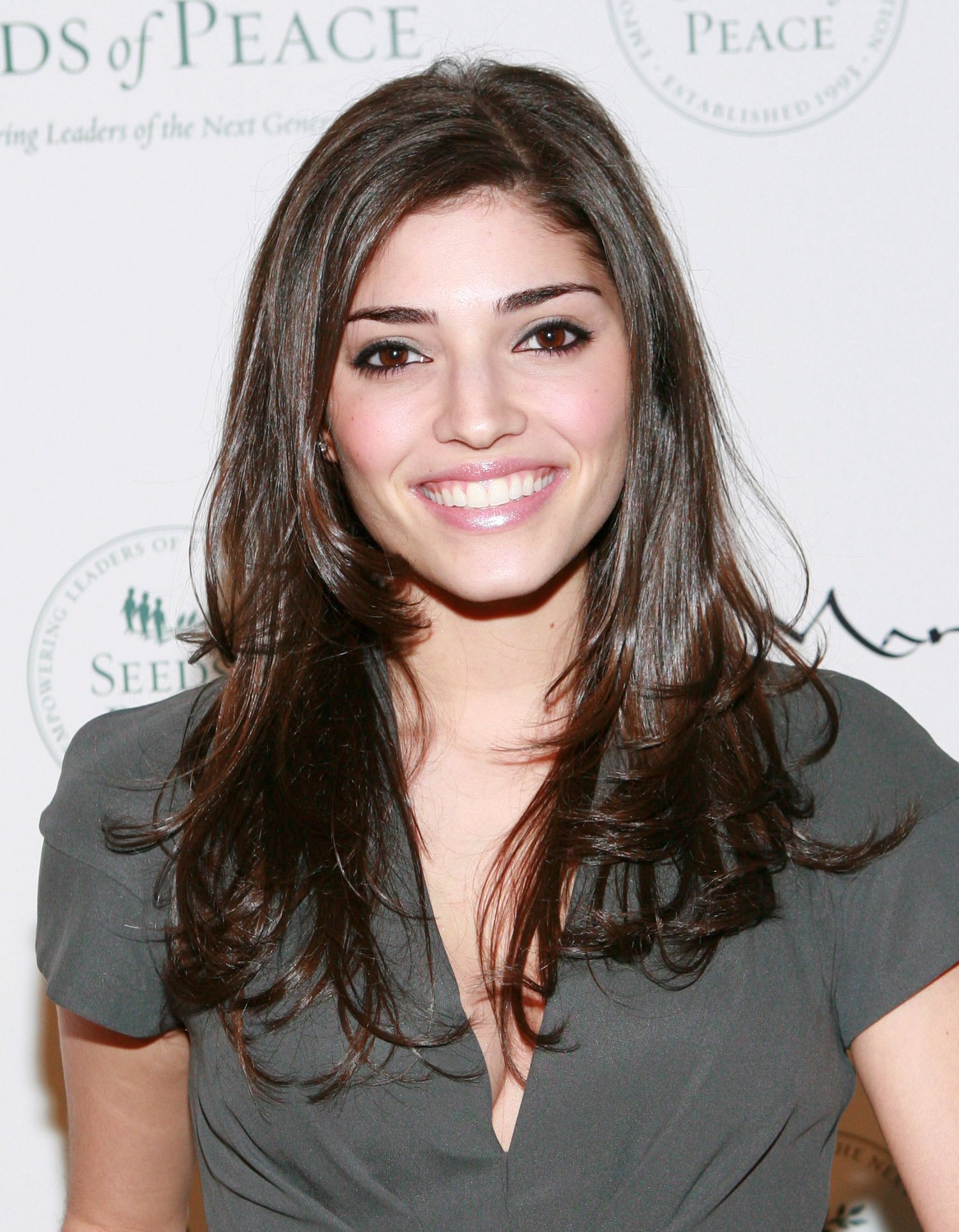
The show's main stars are Robin Williams, Sarah Michelle Gellar, James Wolk, Hamish Linklater and Amanda Setton.

=== Main ===
- Robin Williams as Simon Roberts, a Chicago advertising executive: Robin Williams described Simon as "a guy who can sell anything and he is like a man child. He could sell frappuccinos to Starbucks. He could sell clouds to God." Touching on how his own life was the inspiration for Simon's backstory, Williams said, "Simon's a guy with a lot of nuance. He's lived hard and been on the edge for a long time. Multiple marriages, rehab, even rehab in wine country. Trust me, I've done the research myself." During the time since Simon was divorced with Sydney's mother, he has been married several times, and genuinely wants to be part of his daughter's life. He adds Sydney to the executive partnership after she improves his business, and adds her name to the agency before the start of the series.
- Sarah Michelle Gellar as Sydney Roberts: Simon's daughter is a business partner and director at the ad agency. Her character often plays the "straight woman" to Simon's plans. Raised by her mother after her parents' divorce, she does not fault him for being more involved with work than his family. Despite this, Sydney often uses her past as justification for her business decisions. She has romantic feelings for her best friend, Andrew, but she chooses not to date him, for she values their friendship more and is concerned about the consequences of a break-up.
- James Wolk as Zach Cropper, a copywriter: He is a charismatic but shallow womanizer who does not know much about the advertising business. He has an on-again/off-again physical relationship with Lauren. His colleagues and he often use good looks as an additional advantage for getting clients. Zach enjoys a natural camaraderie with Simon, often bouncing ideas off of each other and brainstorming together.
- Hamish Linklater as Andrew Keanelly, an art director: Andrew is well-spoken, smart, and often on Sydney's side as the second voice of reason among the staff at their agency. He has a sarcastic, down-to-earth personality that contrasts to Zach's occasional overconfidence. Andrew also suffers from a lack of confidence, as part of a large female-based family (referring to himself as "one of seven sisters"). He has a crush on Sydney, who reciprocates these feelings but is hesitant to start a relationship with him, so respects her wishes to stay friends.
- Amanda Setton as Lauren Slotsky, an assistant: Lauren usually comes across as dim-witted, but is described as "much smarter than she first appears", with a vast knowledge of sharks and talent in poetry. She is bisexual.

=== Recurring ===
- Brad Garrett as Gordon Lewis, Simon's business partner: Gordon works on a different floor with accounts. Gordon is Simon's opposite: professional, restrained, and critical of Simon's decisions. Because of this, the two partners tend to share a frenemy relationship. Gordon is also gay, with a longtime live-in partner, Timothy (Jonathan Del Arco).
- Josh Groban as Danny Chase, Sydney's former co-worker: He is obsessed with her and writes a song expressing his unrequited love for her, which he released as a single. On its release, he sends a copy to Sydney. Sydney panics, believing him to be a stalker, and ends her relationship with him. The agency ends up licensing the song for an ad for Australia tourism, and also works with him on a campaign for barbecue sauce.
- Fred Melamed as himself, a voice-over artist who is frequently at odds over the direction of his career.
- Tiya Sircar as Allie, Sydney's assistant, who is hired near the end of the series: She dates Andrew before he breaks up with her per Sydney's wishes. However, when Allie is heartbroken by the breakup, Andrew reunites with her when Sydney asks him to "fix" her. In the end, Allie serves as the impetus for the union of Sydney and Andrew.

=== Guest ===
- Kelly Clarkson as herself
- Saffron Burrows as Helena
- Alan Rachins as Bud Lymsky
- Barry Shabaka Henley as Pete
- Ed Asner as Mr. Finger
- Lavell Crawford as Marvin
- Ashley Tisdale as Kelsi Lasker
- Lenny Jacobson as Jerome
- Missi Pyle as Melora
- Kurt Fuller as Mitchell Payson
- Cheryl Hines as Beth Minkler
- Kareem Abdul-Jabbar as himself
- Brad Paisley as himself
- David Copperfield as himself
- Pam Dawber as Lily
- Jonathan Del Arco as Timothy
- Gayle King as herself
- Marilu Henner as Paige

== Episodes ==
| No. | Title | Directed by | Written by | Original release date | Prod. code | U.S. viewers (millions) |
|---|---|---|---|---|---|---|
| 1 | "Pilot" | Jason Winer | David E. Kelley | September 26, 2013 | 1AXB79 | 15.52 |
Simon and his team try to persuade Kelly Clarkson to sing a jingle for their biggest client, McDonald's, which backfires.
| 2 | "The Spectacular" | Jason Winer | Joe Port & Joe Wiseman | October 3, 2013 | 1AXB02 | 11.71 |
Andrew is jealous of Zach's relationship with Simon, for he believes that Simon favors Zach over him. After Andrew's feelings are known, he receives an assignment from Simon that Zach is at first happy to defer, but later makes him jealous. During Sydney's pitch to Windy City Coffee, Simon suggests a "Spectacular" – a marketing technique – meaning that Sydney has to conjure up a new, bigger pitch, which backfires.
| 3 | "Bad Dad" | Jason Winer | Corey Nickerson | October 10, 2013 | 1AXB01 | 9.69 |
A focus group for an Allstate commercial dredges up old memories of when Simon taught Sydney to drive. Lauren realizes that Zach's and Andrew's relationship is like that between a shark and a remora.
| 4 | "Breakfast Burrito Club" | Michael P. Jann | Rob Sudduth | October 17, 2013 | 1AXB04 | 9.37 |
The group tries to do a campaign for breakfast food, but end up getting distracted with their personal lives.
| 5 | "She's So European" | Jason Winer | Dean Lorey | October 24, 2013 | 1AXB05 | 8.69 |
A Cosmo client excites Simon, Sydney, and Zach, and they subsequently get competitive trying to impress her. However, things go bad when they realize that the models know more than they do.
| 6 | "Hugging the Now" | Fred Savage | Ryan Raddatz | October 31, 2013 | 1AXB03 | 8.06 |
Simon is up against Sydney's high school crush, Josh (Michael Landes), for Advertiser of the Year.
| 7 | "Sydney, Australia" | Bill D'Elia | Tracy Poust & Jon Kinnally | November 7, 2013 | 1AXB06 | 8.00 |
Sydney's ex-coworker Danny Chase (Josh Groban) writes a song about her, but it has a stalker feel to it. Meanwhile, Simon has difficulty coming up with a pitch for the Australian Tourism Board. In the end, Danny decides to help Simon.
| 8 | "The Stan Wood Account" | Jason Winer | Laura Krafft | November 14, 2013 | 1AXB07 | 8.59 |
Gordon, Simon and Sydney's partner, wants Simon to cut ties with an old client. Meanwhile, Sydney entertains an old client (Edward Asner).
| 9 | "Sixteen-Inch Softball" | Alex Hardcastle | Amy Hubbs | November 21, 2013 | 1AXB08 | 8.60 |
The agency's annual softball game is held, which brings back memories for Simon. However, he must practice with help from Zach when he has to fire someone in his creative field should he lose.
| 10 | "Models Love Magic" | Fred Savage | Dean Lorey | December 5, 2013 | 1AXB10 | 7.58 |
Simon and Gordon clash over ignorance pursuing a highly client. Meanwhile, Lauren tries on the Million-Dollar Victoria's Secret bra and is unable to get it off. Real life Victoria's Secret model Adriana Lima guest starred as herself.
| 11 | "The Intern" | Fred Goss | Joe Port & Joe Wiseman | December 12, 2013 | 1AXB09 | 7.87 |
Sydney's confidence is tested when a client's obnoxious daughter Kelsi Lasker (Ashley Tisdale), becomes an intern.
| 12 | "The Face of a Winner" | Jason Winer | Mason Steinberg | January 2, 2014 | 1AXB12 | 8.20 |
Sydney becomes a video game addict when Simon puts her and Lauren to the task.
| 13 | "Outbreak" | Bill D'Elia | Rob Sudduth | January 9, 2014 | 1AXB13 | 9.52 |
Lauren finally gets her big break when all the coworkers come down with the flu.
| 14 | "Simon Roberts Was Here" | Steven Tsuchida | Ryan Raddatz | January 30, 2014 | 1AXB14 | 8.25 |
Simon loses a creativity contest to a research analyst, so Zach and Andrew try to help him refocus and get his confidence back. Elsewhere, Sydney bonds with a cat, causing her to worry if this will stifle her future relationships.
| 15 | "Dead and Improved" | Bill D'Elia | David E. Kelley | February 6, 2014 | 1AXB11 | 7.48 |
Simon must deliver a eulogy to a fellow client whom many people have disliked.
| 16 | "Zach Mitzvah" | Jason Winer | Tracy Poust & Jon Kinnally | February 27, 2014 | 1AXB15 | 7.41 |
Simon throws a Bar Mitzvah for a client's son, but the celebration goes south when Zach encounters a past love interest.
| 17 | "Heavy Meddling" | Alex Hardcastle | Bill Kunstler | March 6, 2014 | 1AXB16 | 6.96 |
Simon interferes with Sydney's new relationship because he wants to become a grandfather. Elsewhere, Zach and Andrew pair up with other coworkers.
| 18 | "March Madness" | Linda Mendoza | Laura Krafft | March 13, 2014 | 1AXB17 | 6.71 |
Andrew's sisters arrive to celebrate St. Patrick's Day, which displeases Simon because he disapproves of the holiday.
| 19 | "Danny Chase Hates Brad Paisley" | David Katzenberg | Amy Hubbs | April 3, 2014 | 1AXB19 | 6.53 |
In trying to land an account to represent the makers of Simon's favorite barbecue sauce, Zach over-promises and tells the company reps he can get Brad Paisley to sing a jingle for them. While he and Simon ultimately do land the country star, they then have to convince jingle writer Danny Chase (Josh Groban) to work with Paisley, whom he hates. Meanwhile, Sydney fears she will lose her "perfect" new assistant Allie (Tiya Sircar) after Andrew dates the woman once, then dumps her.
| 20 | "Love Sucks" | Bill D'Elia | Mason Steinberg | April 10, 2014 | 1AXB18 | 6.87 |
Simon has a budding romance, but things go bad when Gordon is heartbroken when his boyfriend Timothy breaks up with him. Simon's romantic partner, Lily, is played by Williams's Mork & Mindy costar Pam Dawber.
| 21 | "The Monster" | Jason Winer | Dean Lorey | April 17, 2014 | 1AXB21 | 6.19 |
Simon's team comes up with a crazy way to save the town's library, and Gordon serves as the poster boy when he refuses to help the team. Meanwhile, Lauren and Andrew are troubled when Zach hangs out with Sydney's boyfriend, both unaware that the man is gay.
| 22 | "The Lighthouse" | Matt Sohn | Tracy Poust & Jon Kinnally | April 17, 2014 | 1AXB20 | 5.23 |
Paige Roberts (Marilu Henner), Simon's ex-wife and Sydney's mother, comes to town and is the deciding vote to save the agency from a sale that Gordon supports and Simon opposes. Meanwhile, after advice from her parents, Sydney kisses Andrew, who, in turn, seemed to have mixed feelings about it.

== Production ==
The series was created by David E. Kelley, who had created several successful workplace television series, albeit mostly hourlong comedy dramas.

It stars Robin Williams as Simon Roberts, an executive at the Chicago advertising agency Lewis, Roberts + Roberts, who works with his tightly wound daughter and protégée Sydney, played by Sarah Michelle Gellar. The series represented Williams's first series regular role since Mork & Mindy 31 years earlier, and the first series for Gellar since Ringer, which was cancelled by The CW in 2012 after one season. Williams's part was written with him in mind. When Gellar learned that Williams was making a television comedy, she contacted her friend Sarah de Sa Rego, the wife of Williams's best friend, Bobcat Goldthwait, to lobby for a co-starring role.

The series was filmed on soundstages of 12, 11 and 14 at the 20th Century Fox Studios in Los Angeles, which had previously housed the production for the medical drama House.

Big-brand names were referenced in episodes to evoke a sense of realism, although the companies that owned the brands did not pay for it, nor did they get script approval. In the pilot, singer Kelly Clarkson performed a modified version of the McDonald's slogan "You deserve a break today".

== Reception ==
=== Ratings ===
The premiere episode garnered 15.52 million viewers, making the show the highest-viewed premiere in fall 2013. Its 18-49 rating (3.9/11) was also the highest rated new comedy premiere rating of the season. With the Live + 3 days DVR numbers, the pilot episode added +22% viewers, gathering 18.98 million viewers and a 6.8 adults 25–54 rating, with 5.1 in adults 18–49. During the 2013-2014 season, the show's ratings fell, with its season finale garnering 5.23 million viewers. On May 10, 2014, CBS announced that it had canceled The Crazy Ones.

=== Critical response ===
The show received mixed reviews from critics. The first season received a score of 58 out of 100 on Metacritic, indicating "mixed or average" reviews.

Morgan Jeffery of Digital Spy wrote, "Williams can't resist falling back on his old bag of tricks on occasion – cartoon voices, gurning, rambling wordplay – but there's a decent amount of pathos to his performance as part-buffoon, part-genius Simon Roberts too and the comedy veteran shares a warm, genuine chemistry with his on-screen offspring Gellar."

Rob Owen of the Pittsburgh Post-Gazette wrote, "Whether The Crazy Ones can come together as a series over time remains an open question, but the pilot offers enough charm and humor to warrant future consideration."

The Washington Post wrote that the pilot "leaves you wanting more", and gave the pilot a grade of "B–" on a scale of A+ to F.

According to Ross Bonaime of Paste, "I don't know how it does it, but The Crazy Ones continues to be one of the most boring comedies with one of the most amazing casts on the air today." He continues to say, "The entire show is just treading on 'meh.' It also feels like this show just exists in a vacuum, with nothing in any prior episode really having an effect on anything that comes after it. There are no continuing story arcs, nor any real characters to really bond with."

The Boston Herald gave the show a negative review, noting that "Williams seems exhausted".

The pilot episode's positive reviews were also for guest-star Kelly Clarkson; website ET Online claimed that she was a "front runner" for an Emmy nomination in 2014 for Guest Actress in a Comedy Series. Website Gold Derby feels that the lack of Golden Globe nominations for the show, for Best Comedy, Lead Actress (for Gellar) and Lead Actor (for Williams) was a "snub".

David E. Kelley became particularly critical of the show and said, "The show wasn't very good. It started off with great ratings, but after watching three or four episodes, I thought the storytelling was pretty bad... Robin Williams was great... but the stories made me want to hold my nose." In 2023, Sarah Michelle Gellar commented, "I loved that show. I could have done it for five or seven years and seen my kids grow up."

=== Accolades ===
Awards
| Award | Category | Recipients and nominees | Result |
|---|---|---|---|
| 4th Critics' Choice Television Awards | Best Actor in a Comedy Series | Robin Williams | Nominated |
| People's Choice Award | Favorite New TV Comedy | | Nominated |
| People's Choice Award | Favorite Actor in a New TV Series | Robin Williams | Nominated |
| People's Choice Award | Favorite Actress in a New TV Series | Sarah Michelle Gellar | Won |

== Home media ==
On April 7, 2015, the series became available on a 3-disc DVD set via Amazon.com's DVD-R on-demand service, containing all 22 episodes.
