= Mad TV =

American sketch comedy television series

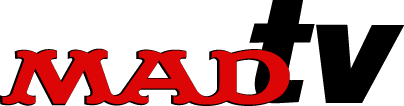
- Genre: Sketch comedy; Parody; Satire
- Created by: David Salzman; Fax Bahr; Adam Small
- Based on: Mad by EC Comics
- Starring: see list of cast members
- Theme music composer: Greg O'Connor; Blake Aaron
- Country of origin: United States
- Original language: English
- No. of seasons: 14
- No. of episodes: 321 (list of episodes)

Production
- Executive producers: David Salzman; Quincy Jones; Fax Bahr; Adam Small
- Production locations: Hollywood Center Studios; Sunset Bronson Studios
- Production companies: Quincy Jones-David Salzman Entertainment; Bahr/Small Productions (seasons 1–3)

Original release
- Network: Fox
- Release: October 14, 1995 – May 16, 2009

Related
- Mad (2010–2013); Mad TV (2016)

Mad TV (stylized as MADtv) is an American sketch comedy television series created by David Salzman, Fax Bahr, and Adam Small. Loosely based on the humor magazine Mad, Mad TV's pre-taped satirical sketches were primarily parodies of popular culture and occasionally politics. Many of its sketches featured the show's cast members playing recurring original characters and doing celebrity impressions. The series premiered on Fox on October 14, 1995, and ran for 14 seasons. Its final episode aired on May 16, 2009.

Salzman created Mad TV with record producer Quincy Jones after they purchased the rights to Mad in 1995. Salzman brought on Bahr and Small, who had formerly written for the sketch comedy television series In Living Color, as showrunners. The show was intended to compete with fellow sketch comedy series Saturday Night Live (SNL), which was experiencing declining viewership and poor critical reception. Critics noted that Mad TV had a more diverse cast than SNL and dealt with edgier, more lowbrow humor.

Fox made few efforts to promote Mad TV, which typically fell behind SNL in ratings. Throughout its run, the network continually cut the series' budget before eventually canceling it in 2010. It was nominated for numerous awards, including 43 Primetime Emmy Awards, five of which it won. Critical reception of the series was mixed during its run and its sketches attracted notable controversy. Since its cancellation, it has appeared on several critics' lists of the best sketch comedy television series of all time.

A 20th anniversary reunion special aired on The CW on January 12, 2016. The CW also rebooted the series for a 15th and final season, which premiered on July 26, 2016.

== Development ==
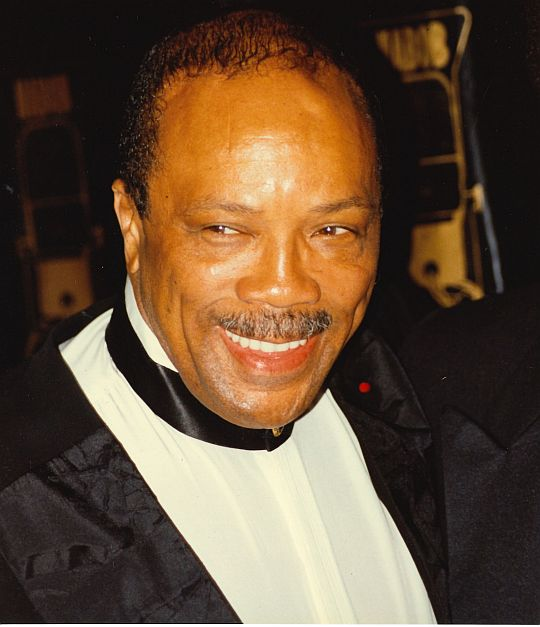
Record producer Quincy Jones (pictured) and television producer David Salzman executive produced Mad TV after buying the rights to its namesake magazine in 1995.

William Gaines, who owned EC Comics and published the American humor magazine Mad from 1950 until his death in 1992, refused to sell the rights to the magazine as he disliked television. In 1995, three years after Gaines's death, EC Comics sold the rights to Mad to record producer Quincy Jones and TV producer David Salzman. The two launched Mad TV through their joint venture, QDE.

Fax Bahr and Adam Small were hired as the showrunners of Mad TV alongside Salzman. They had previously worked as staff writers on the sketch comedy television series In Living Color since 1992. The two left the show in its third season. The series began with 12 writers, including Patton Oswalt, Blaine Capatch, and writers from The Ben Stiller Show. Its pilot episode premiered on October 14, 1995, at 11 p.m. on Fox. The network approved of the pilot and ordered 12 episodes for its first season, which was heavily inspired by the eponymous magazine. It was pre-taped and contained a combination of short live-action sketches, movie parodies, and animated sketches. Animated segments of Spy vs. Spy, a wordless comic strip originally featured in Mad and created by Antonio Prohías, appeared on the first four seasons of Mad TV. The show's theme song was created by American hip hop group Heavy D & the Boyz, who had previously created the theme song for In Living Color, and composed by Greg O'Connor and Blake Aaron, the latter of whom was Mad TV's guitarist. Filming took place in Hollywood at Hollywood Center Studios and later at Sunset Bronson Studios.

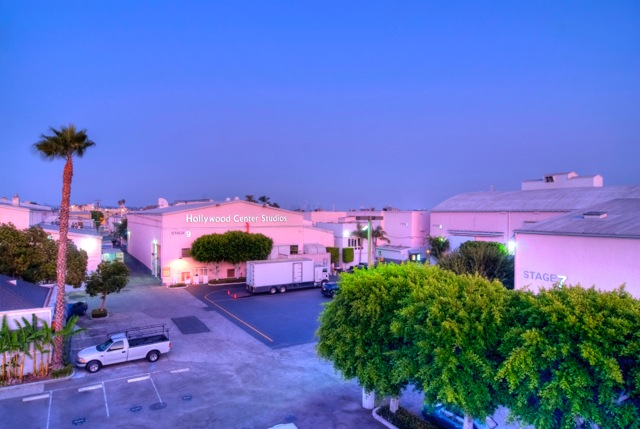

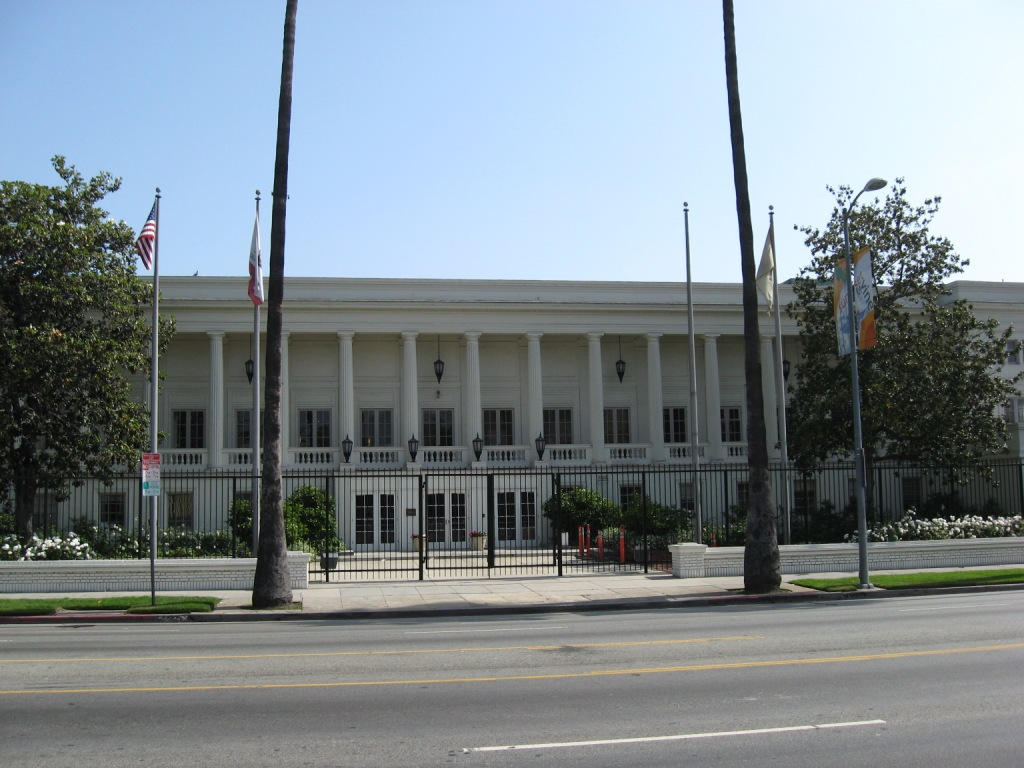
Filming for Mad TV took place in Hollywood at Hollywood Center Studios (top) and later at Sunset Bronson Studios (bottom).

The series satirized popular culture, with sketches parodying film, television and music. Sketches often featured celebrity impressions and occasionally contained political satire, and Fox executive Joe Earley called the series "an equal opportunity offender". Bruce Leddy became the show's director and supervising producer starting in 2000. After Mad TV's first season, Fox rarely promoted the series and frequently made budget cuts, with cast and crew members such as Debra Wilson and Bahr referring to the series as the "redheaded stepchild" of Fox. The Hollywood Reporter's James Hibberd wrote prior to its cancellation that Mad TV had been "like a distant cousin of [Fox's] other programming" during its runtime; David Nevins, Fox's former executive vice president of programming, attributed the lack of promotion to Fox focusing on advertising its new prime time series instead. Fox executives and Mad TV's showrunners often shot down sketch ideas that were viewed admirably by the staff writers, who wanted the show to be "edgy". Mad TV was partially intended to compete with fellow late-night sketch comedy series Saturday Night Live, which, at the time of Mad TV's debut, was being poorly received by critics. However, SNL quickly bounced back and Mad TV typically trailed behind the show in ratings.

In November 2008, Fox confirmed that Mad TV's 326th episode during its shortened 14th season would be its last, telling Salzman that the show was too expensive considering its ratings and time slot. By this point, it was the fourth longest-running Fox series after The Simpsons, Cops, and America's Most Wanted. Salzman said that he would be exploring the continuation of the show on another channel, possibly cable. In early 2009, the show was briefly moved to air after Talkshow with Spike Feresten, the show that normally followed MADtv, before being moved back. The series finale aired on May 16, 2009. It featured both new and old sketches and revolved around a fictional telethon called "Mad TV Gives Back".

=== Reunion special ===
Mad TV had a one-hour-long 20th anniversary reunion special, titled MADtv 20th Anniversary Reunion. It was executive produced by Salzman, directed by Bruce Leddy, and produced by Telepictures and Epicenter Ventures. It aired on The CW on January 12, 2016, at 8 p.m. and garnered 1.7 million viewers. Its plot involved 19 returning cast members going to an awards show where things go awry.

== Cast and characters ==
The inaugural 1995 cast of Mad TV, from left to right: David Herman, Nicole Sullivan, Phil LaMarr, Debra Wilson, Artie Lange, Orlando Jones, Mary Scheer, and Bryan Callen

Mad TV's cast was considered diverse by critics, especially compared to that of SNL. According to casting director Nicole Garcia, the showrunners sought a diverse cast from the beginning of the series. Its first season starred Debra Wilson, Nicole Sullivan, Phil LaMarr, Artie Lange, Mary Scheer, Bryan Callen, Orlando Jones, and David Herman.

Wilson was the first cast member hired for Mad TV. She starred in the first eight seasons of the series from 1995 to 2003, making her the longest-running original cast member and the only Black female cast member during her time on the show. She later stated that she left the series in 2003 after learning that she received a lower salary than a White male cast member who had joined after she did, and that her salary negotiations had failed. Sullivan was added to the cast because, according to her, Bahr and Small wanted someone on the show who "the audience would like to have dinner with". She starred on the show from 1995 to 2001 and left to star in the ABC sitcom Me and My Needs, which was not picked up by the network after its pilot episode. Herman starred in the short-lived Fox sketch comedy series House of Buggin' before appearing on Mad TV, while Jones had written for the Fox series Roc. Jones, Callen, and Lange all left the show after its second season.

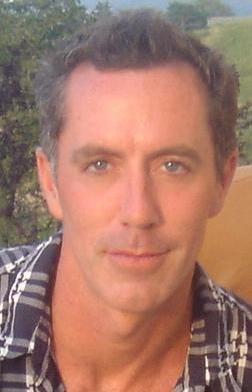
Michael McDonald (pictured) was Mad TV's longest-tenured cast member, starring in ten seasons.

Michael McDonald starred on Mad TV for ten seasons starting in 1998 and was the show's longest-running and oldest cast member, also occasionally directing segments. The show's second longest-running cast member was Aries Spears, who appeared in 198 episodes from its third season in 1997 until its tenth season in 2005. Other popular cast members included Alex Borstein, who starred on the show for five seasons from 1997 to 2002; Ike Barinholtz, who joined in 2002 and left in 2007; Will Sasso, who joined the show in its third season; Mo Collins, who joined in 1998 and left in 2004; Stephnie Weir, who starred on the show for six years; Nicole Parker, who appeared on six seasons of the show; and Bobby Lee, who appeared on eight seasons of the show from 2001 to 2009. Other cast members, such as Andy Daly, Simon Helberg, and Taran Killam, the last of whom was the youngest person ever to be cast on the show, found fame after brief tenures on Mad TV. Comedians Jordan Peele and Keegan-Michael Key met after being cast on Mad TV in 2004 for its ninth season, and the two would later star together in the Comedy Central sketch comedy series Key & Peele. Peele left the series in 2008, while Key stayed until the show's final season.

Borstein and Peele were both kept from leaving Mad TV to pursue other roles due to their contracts, with Borstein having to turn down a role as Sookie on the CW series Gilmore Girls and Peele turning down a role playing Barack Obama for SNL.

=== Recurring characters ===
Numerous characters and sketches on Mad TV became notable for their frequent appearances. Michael McDonald played Stuart Larkin, an overgrown, spoiled child with a bowl cut, bright red cheeks, and a rainbow plaid shirt. His overbearing single mother, Doreen (played by Mo Collins), has a strong Wisconsin accent and was inspired by McDonald's own mother. Sketches with Stuart often involve him and his mother visiting various businesses where he frustrates the employees with his antics. He has a number of catch phrases, including "Look what I can do!", "I don't wanna say," "Let me do it!", and "Dooooon't!", while his mother always mentions that Stuart's father "left us on Tuesday". Stuart appeared in 38 sketches in nine seasons from 1998 to 2008. He was described by Megh Wright of Vulture as the show's most memorable character and by Thomas Attila Lewis of LAist as "incredibly popular".

Alex Borstein appeared in 44 sketches as the popular recurring character of Bunny Swan, better known as Ms. Swan, an immigrant nail salon owner and manicurist with a strong, exaggerated accent who annoys others by not being able to answer simple questions. She has a bob cut and wears a muumuu and a rainbow plaid jumper; she also has catch phrases such as "He look-a like-a man". Although Ms. Swan was presumed by audiences to be Asian, the series identifies her as hailing from Kuvaria, the home of Santa Claus, while Borstein stated that her inspirations for the character were her Hungarian-Jewish grandmother, and Icelandic singer Björk. Elahe Izadi of the Washington Post included the Ms. Swan sketches on a list of the "20 defining comedy sketches of the past 20 years" in 2019, writing that they were "among the most widely remembered of Mad TV's work". Borstein briefly reprised the role outside of Mad TV for a parody of the trailer for the 2010 film Black Swan and for a video about the 2016 United States presidential election.

The Vancome Lady is a verbally abusive, and shamelessly bigoted woman who struggled to keep a job due to her ignorant remarks. She was played by Nicole Sullivan, made over 25 appearances on the show—starting with its pilot episode—and was the first recurring character on the show. She was described by Candace Amos of the New York Daily News as "one of the characters fans loved to hate". A sketch featuring cast member Anjelah Johnson as the irritable Latina fast food worker Bon Qui Qui became popular on YouTube. Johnson has frequently reprised the character since, releasing the album Gold Plated Dreams as the character in 2015 through Warner Records.

Many of the show's recurring characters were parodies of celebrities such as Will Sasso's portrayal of singer Randy Newman and Aries Spears's portrayal of Bill Cosby. Debra Wilson and Aries Spears frequently appeared on the show as married singers Whitney Houston and Bobby Brown, who they portrayed as drug-addled, frantic, and "ghetto". Along with her impression of Houston, Wilson also earned fame and acclaim for her impression of Oprah Winfrey on the show, with Vanity Fair's Yohana Desta describing Wilson's impression of Winfrey as "the gold standard" and HuffPost's Pollo Del Mar writing that Wilson's impressions of Winfrey and Houston were "as iconic as they were scathing". Wilson went on to play Winfrey on the animated sitcom The Proud Family and in the 2006 parody film Scary Movie 4. Other frequent celebrity impressions included Sasso's impressions of actors Robert De Niro and James Gandolfini, Lee's impression of newscaster Connie Chung, and Frank Caliendo's impressions of John Madden and George W. Bush.

== Release ==
=== Episodes ===
Season	Episodes	Originally released		
Season	Episodes	First released	Last released	Network
1	19	October 14, 1995	June 22, 1996	Fox
2	22	September 21, 1996	May 17, 1997	Fox
3	25	September 20, 1997	May 16, 1998	Fox
4	25	September 12, 1998	May 22, 1999	Fox
5	25	September 25, 1999	May 20, 2000	Fox
6	30	September 23, 2000	June 23, 2001	Fox
7	25	September 22, 2001	May 18, 2002	Fox
8	25	September 14, 2002	May 17, 2003	Fox
9	25	September 13, 2003	May 22, 2004	Fox
10	23	September 18, 2004	May 21, 2005	Fox
11	22	September 17, 2005	May 20, 2006	Fox
12	22	September 16, 2006	May 19, 2007	Fox
13	16	September 15, 2007	May 17, 2008	Fox
14	17	September 13, 2008	May 16, 2009	Fox
15	8	July 26, 2016	September 27, 2016	The CW

=== Broadcast and syndication ===
Mad TV was owned by Warner Bros. and broadcast every Saturday at 11 p.m. on Fox until its final episode in 2009. Reruns also aired on Fox during prime time starting in 1999. TNN aired reruns of the series after acquiring the nonexclusive cable TV rights to it in 2000, while Comedy Central acquired the rights to the show's first nine seasons in 2004 and aired reruns until 2008.

=== Home media and streaming services ===
A DVD set of the first season of Mad TV, entitled Mad TV: The Complete First Season, was released in 2004 by Warner Bros. It includes a blooper reel, unaired sketches, and the show's 200th episode from 2003. It was reviewed positively by Chris Hicks of the Deseret News, who said that it "demonstrates that the show is frequently very funny, in its own subversive way." Warner Bros. also released a "best of" DVD for seasons eight, nine, and ten on October 25, 2005.

Episodes of the series were also made available to stream on The WB's website, TheWB.com, after its launch in 2008, and on The CW's streaming service, CW Seed, after the announcement of the show's 2016 reboot. The series was also available to stream on HBO Max when it premiered in 2020, though the only episodes shown were the FOX episodes, and a lot of episodes weren't shown due to music licensing and copyright issues involving the musical guests and celebrities who cameoed on the show, with seasons 11, 13, and 14 as the only seasons with every episode present and accounted for (the revival season from 2016 was available on streaming, but it was only available on Hulu).

As of 2025, HBO Max no longer streams MADtv, but it is currently available on the Roku streaming service, Howdy, using the same version from HBO Max. In 2026, Tubi also uploaded MADtv. Like the HBO Max and Howdy versions, the episodes are the ones from FOX where most episodes aren't shown due to licensing/copyright issues, with seasons 11, 13, and 14 the only seasons that has every episode available. Unlike HBO Max and Howdy, Tubi doesn't have season 2 available.

== Reception ==
=== Viewership ===
Mad TV was particularly popular among teenage viewers, who, according to Fox executives, watched the show more than SNL by 2001. Former cast members have stated that teenagers often made up the majority of the show's studio audience. In 2000, 59 percent of Mad TV's audience was between the ages of 18 and 49. By late 2003, Mad TV averaged 4.4 million viewers per week. Upon the series's cancellation in 2008, the series was averaging 2.6 million viewers, which was a 6 percent decrease from the previous year.

=== Critical reception ===
In a review of Mad TV's pilot, the Orlando Sentinel called SNL "a corpse trying to reanimate itself" while praising Mad TV as "promising". Another review of Mad TV's pilot in the Hartford Courant by James Endrst stated that Mad TV was "only occasionally terrible". A review of the pilot episode by Tom Shales in The Roanoke Times wrote that Mad TV was "bad TV", criticizing it as tasteless and unintelligent. For People, Craig Tomashoff gave the pilot a C−, stating that it was "pretending to be daring and irreverent" despite being "just unimaginative". In 1996, Mad TV was reviewed favorably by Steve Johnson of the Chicago Tribune, who wrote that it "looked consistently fresh, with more energy, imagination and edge [than SNL]" and "rewards the effort of tuning it in". Ginia Bellafante of Time also wrote in 1996 that "it has steadily improved since its unpromising early episodes", but that many of its politically incorrect sketches were "so heavy-handed" that they were "virtually unwatchable". After the end of the show's fourth season, Terry Kelleher of People wrote that Mad TV was "not a bad product" but had a "policy of putting recurring characters through the same tired paces". Entertainment Weekly's Alynda Wheat was critical of the show's finale, writing that "maybe it was time for Mad TV to go" due to "how thin its material has grown".

The A.V. Club's John Hugar called Mad TV "eh" with "some memorable recurring characters" such as Stuart that relied on "excessively broad comedy". In 2016, Jesse Thorn of The A.V. Club retrospectively described Mad TV as "long-running" and "critically maligned", and The A.V. Club's Chris O'Connell wrote in 2010 that it was "the worst sketch-comedy show on television". The Detroit Free Press's Julie Hinds wrote that the show "wasn't the most consistent vehicle", and that it "sometimes went too far with a joke but could still crack you up regularly". Common Sense Media's Lucy Maher gave the series three out of five stars, stating that it "purposely pushes the limits of decency to the breaking point" but that it had "moments of brilliance". In a retrospective review of the show, Carleton Atwater of Vulture criticized it as "so lazy and unambitious" and wrote that it "appeals to the lowest common denominator". Aisha Harris of Slate wrote that the show "could so often be joke-writing at its laziest", but that it "could also occasionally be very good and smart" when it struck a balance between "titillation, insight, and hilarity". For The New Yorker, Zadie Smith wrote that Mad TV's humor was "broad—and too reliant on celebrity subjects".

=== Saturday Night Live comparisons ===
Mad TV has frequently been compared to Saturday Night Live. Rolling Stone described Mad TV as a "more cultish weekend cousin to Saturday Night Live aimed squarely at teens", while the Detroit Free Press's Julie Hinds called it "a boisterous second cousin" of SNL. Slate's Aisha Harris called Mad TV "a scrappy, less sophisticated cousin of SNL", and IGN called Mad TV "the young, scrappy upstart to SNL's elder statesman brand of sketch comedy". Luke Winkie of Vulture wrote that, despite not having the "live kinetic energy" or "the all-star glitz" of SNL, "most children of the '90s have a special place in our hearts for MADtv". Terry Kelleher of People wrote, "It would be easy to dismiss [Mad TV] ... as the poor man's Saturday Night Live. But basically Mad TV has everything SNL has—the virtues and the defects."

Cast and crew members later stated that Mad TV lacked the "hipness" that SNL had, but noted that it instead appealed more to "the average person" and to middle-class people of color. Ginia Bellafante of Time wrote in 1996 that Mad TV had a "more balanced cast" than SNL and "an edginess that Lorne Michaels' once revolutionary show has long lacked". Salzman stated that Mad TV's racially diverse cast and "urban sensibility" set it apart from SNL. Mad TV's former video researcher Asterios Kokkinos, who was fired in 2007 after helping to shut down a Mad TV shoot as part of the Writers Guild of America Strike, wrote for Paste that the show was "a cheaper copy of [SNL]" that "nobody seemed to care about".

=== Controversies ===
Some celebrities and organizations have spoken out against parodies of themselves on Mad TV. Bobby Brown said in 2022 that the show's parodies of him and Whitney Houston "really offended" him, while Rosie O'Donnell shared on her self-titled talk show that she was offended by the show's parody of her, in which Borstein portrayed her as a closeted lesbian. In 2003, the United States Postal Service and the National Association of Letter Carriers both publicly called on all of their employees to protest Mad TV over a then-upcoming sketch about a group of gun-wielding postal workers arguing over who should be able to "go postal" first. The Postal Service's then-vice president of public affairs, Azeezaly S. Jaffer, called the sketch "ugly", "untrue", and "an insult to every man and woman in the Postal Service". Steven Spielberg was reportedly angered after reading a leaked script of the show's Schindler's List parody, titled "Schindler's Lost". Following phone calls to Sidney Sheinberg, Rupert Murdoch and Quincy Jones, the sketch was not aired.

The show was also criticized by audiences and critics for relying on stereotypes. Borstein's character Ms. Swan in particular has frequently been identified by journalists and by Asian activists such as Guy Aoki and Margaret Cho as an example of yellowface. The character was protested by Aoki's organization Media Action Network for Asian Americans (MANAA). In 2019, the Washington Post's Elahe Izadi called Ms. Swan an example of "the kind of 'problematic' stuff TV networks used to air" and "'edgy' comedy from the early aughts that more overtly trafficked in racial stereotypes". Candace Amos of New York Daily News wrote that Ms. Swan would "both anger and delight fans" and "was often called out for being racist", and Lara Zarum of Flavorwire wrote that "we're all in agreement that Ms. Swan, the nail-salon-owning, squinty-eyed, walking Asian stereotype, is a problem".

Mad TV also featured two instances of blackface: one in which Bobby Lee plays George Foreman's fictional half-Asian son, and another wherein Michael McDonald plays a magical busboy from a foreign island.

=== Accolades ===
Rotten Tomatoes, Rolling Stone, and Screen Rant all placed Mad TV on their lists of the greatest sketch comedy TV series of all time, with Rolling Stone writing that it was "beholden to no one and often about as subtle as Artie Lange laughing at a fart" and a "ceaseless roast". The Black Spy and the White Spy from Mad TV's animated Spy vs. Spy sketches were listed as two of the best TV spies of all time by Entertainment Weekly in 2014.

Mad TV was nominated for 43 Primetime Emmy Awards, all of which were for technical achievements, and won five of them. It won the Emmys for Outstanding Hairstyling for a Series in 2001, for Outstanding Costumes for a Variety or Music Program in 2005 and in 2006, for Outstanding Music and Lyrics for the song "A Wonderfully Normal Day" in 2006, and for Non-Prosthetic Makeup for a Multi-Camera Series in 2009. In 2007, Mad TV's Emmys campaign, VoteMadTV.com, allowed Emmys voters to view clips of the series online rather than being shipped DVD screeners in an attempt to be more eco-friendly. Anjelah Johnson was nominated for an ALMA Award for her performance on Mad TV in 2008.

== 2016 reboot ==
Mad TV
- Genre: Sketch comedy; Parody; Satire
- Created by: David Salzman
- Starring: Carlie Craig; Chelsea Davison; Jeremy D. Howard; Amir K; Lyric Lewis; Piotr Michael; Michelle Ortiz; Adam Ray
- Original language: English
- No. of seasons: 1
- No. of episodes: 8 (list of episodes)

Production
- Executive producers: David Salzman; John R. Montgomery; Mark Teitelbaum
- Running time: 60 minutes
- Production companies: Epicenter Ventures; Montgomery Studios; Teitelbaum Artists; Telepictures

Original release
- Network: The CW
- Release: July 26 – September 27, 2016

A reboot of Mad TV, which was produced by Telepictures, created by Salzman, and executive produced by him, John R. Montgomery, and Mark Teitelbaum, premiered on The CW on July 26, 2016. It ran for eight hour-long episodes on Tuesday nights and starred eight new cast members: Carlie Craig, Chelsea Davison, Jeremy D. Howard, Amir K, Lyric Lewis, Piotr Michael, Michelle Ortiz and Adam Ray. Cast members from the original series such as Sullivan, Sasso, Collins, Lee, Barinholtz, and Wilson, hosted. The reboot placed a greater emphasis on political comedy than its predecessor and included parodies of former U.S. presidents such as then-candidate Donald Trump and Bill Clinton, the latter of whom had been spoofed in the original series several times during the late 1990s.

The reboot received mostly negative reviews from critics. Ray Rahman of Entertainment Weekly wrote that it was "inconsistent and lack[ed] any urgency" while "fail[ing] to justify its existence", calling its humor "not just lame, but also stale". Aisha Harris of Slate similarly wrote, "In its new, blander incarnation, it's hard to imagine why MadTV needs to exist at all." IGN's Jesse Schedeen gave the revival a score of 3.2 out of a 10, writing that it had a "simplistic, toothless brand of humor" and failed "to recapture any of the show's old spark". The A.V. Club's John Hugar gave the premiere a C− and wrote that "the new Mad TV can't help but seem like an off-brand version of the original, which was an off-brand SNL to begin with". The Guardian's Brian Moylan praised the diversity of the new cast but wrote that it was mostly not funny, while Common Sense Media's Melissa Camacho gave it three out of five stars and wrote, "Fans of the original show will find it funny, but its irreverent humor isn't for everyone."

== See also ==
- Mad (TV series)
