= List of Mad TV episodes =

Mad TV is an American comedy sketch television series originally inspired by Mad magazine. It originally aired on Fox from October 14, 1995 to May 16, 2009. It was later revived and a rebooted season premiered on July 26, 2016 on The CW.

== Series overview ==
| Season | Episodes | Originally released | | |
| Season | Episodes | First released | Last released | Network |
|---|---|---|---|---|
| 1 | 19 | October 14, 1995 | June 22, 1996 | Fox |
| 2 | 22 | September 21, 1996 | May 17, 1997 | Fox |
| 3 | 25 | September 20, 1997 | May 16, 1998 | Fox |
| 4 | 25 | September 12, 1998 | May 22, 1999 | Fox |
| 5 | 25 | September 25, 1999 | May 20, 2000 | Fox |
| 6 | 30 | September 23, 2000 | June 23, 2001 | Fox |
| 7 | 25 | September 22, 2001 | May 18, 2002 | Fox |
| 8 | 25 | September 14, 2002 | May 17, 2003 | Fox |
| 9 | 25 | September 13, 2003 | May 22, 2004 | Fox |
| 10 | 23 | September 18, 2004 | May 21, 2005 | Fox |
| 11 | 22 | September 17, 2005 | May 20, 2006 | Fox |
| 12 | 22 | September 16, 2006 | May 19, 2007 | Fox |
| 13 | 16 | September 15, 2007 | May 17, 2008 | Fox |
| 14 | 17 | September 13, 2008 | May 16, 2009 | Fox |
| 15 | 8 | July 26, 2016 | September 27, 2016 | The CW |

== Episodes ==
=== Season 1 (1995–96) ===
| No. overall | No. in season | Guest(s) | Original release date |
|---|---|---|---|
| 1 | 1 | Kato Kaelin and Poison | October 14, 1995 |
| 2 | 2 | Kato Kaelin, Joe Walsh and Dean Stockwell | October 21, 1995 |
| 3 | 3 | Peter Marshall | October 28, 1995 |
| 4 | 4 | Michael Buffer, Adam West and Gary Coleman | November 4, 1995 |
| 5 | 5 | TBA | November 11, 1995 |
| 6 | 6 | Neve Campbell, Jamie Farr, Matthew Fox, Dana Gould, Scott Wolf | November 18, 1995 |
| 7 | 7 | Billy Barty, Dave Foley, Ken Norton, Jr. | November 25, 1995 |
| 8 | 8 | Quincy Jones, LL Cool J, RuPaul | December 9, 1995 |
| 9 | 9 | Pauly Shore | December 16, 1995 |
| 10 | 10 | Andy Kindler, Rip Taylor | January 6, 1996 |
| 11 | 11 | Tony Orlando, The Presidents of the United States of America (Musical Guest) | January 13, 1996 |
| 12 | 12 | David Faustino, Pharcyde | February 3, 1996 |
| 13 | 13 | TBA | February 10, 1996 |
| 14 | 14 | Whoopi Goldberg, Brian Austin Green | February 17, 1996 |
| 15 | 15 | Dave Higgins, Doug Llewelyn | March 9, 1996 |
| 16 | 16 | Chris Hardwick, Barry Williams | March 16, 1996 |
| 17 | 17 | Claudia Schiffer and Kim Coles | April 6, 1996 |
| 18 | 18 | Bruce McCulloch | May 25, 1996 |
| 19 | 19 | Harland Williams (special guest) | June 22, 1996 |

=== Season 2 (1996–97) ===
| No. overall | No. in season | Guest(s) | Original release date |
|---|---|---|---|
| 20 | 1 | Christina Applegate (host) | September 21, 1996 |
| 21 | 2 | Ice-T (host & musical guest) | September 28, 1996 |
| 22 | 3 | Kim Coles (host) | October 5, 1996 |
| 23 | 4 | Jack Wagner (host), Taylor Negron (special guest) | October 19, 1996 |
| 24 | 5 | Neve Campbell (host) | November 2, 1996 |
| 25 | 6 | Kevin McDonald (host), Tony Cox (special guest) | November 9, 1996 |
| 26 | 7 | Joe Rogan (host) and Ken Norton Jr (special guest) | November 16, 1996 |
| 27 | 8 | French Stewart (host) | December 7, 1996 |
| 28 | 9 | Harry Connick, Jr (host) | December 14, 1996 |
| 29 | 10 | Andrea Martin (host) | January 4, 1997 |
| 30 | 11 | Brian Bosworth and Dom Irrera (special guests) | January 25, 1997 |
| 31 | 12 | Rodney Dangerfield (host) | February 1, 1997 |
| 32 | 13 | Queen Latifah (host) | February 8, 1997 |
| 33 | 14 | Tommy Davidson (host), Tom Kenny (special guest) | February 15, 1997 |
| 34 | 15 | Bobcat Goldthwait (host) | March 8, 1997 |
| 35 | 16 | Pauly Shore (host) | March 15, 1997 |
| 36 | 17 | Thomas Calabro (host) and Corky and the Juice Pigs (Musical Guest) | April 5, 1997 |
| 37 | 18 | Mark Curry (host), Ike Turner (special guest) | April 12, 1997 |
| 38 | 19 | Adam Arkin (host) Bob Marley (special guest) | April 26, 1997 |
| 39 | 20 | Ryan Stiles (host) | May 3, 1997 |
| 40 | 21 | David Faustino (host) | May 10, 1997 |
| 41 | 22 | LL Cool J (host) | May 17, 1997 |

=== Season 3 (1997–98) ===
| No. overall | No. in season | Guest(s) | Original release date |
|---|---|---|---|
| 42 | 1 | Sandra Bernhard (host) and Jalen Rose (special guest) | September 20, 1997 |
| 43 | 2 | Carmen Electra (host) and Salt N Pepa (special guest) | September 27, 1997 |
| 44 | 3 | Corky and the Juice Pigs (musical guests) | October 4, 1997 |
| 45 | 4 | Jennifer Love Hewitt and Daisy Fuentes (special guests) | October 11, 1997 |
| 46 | 5 | TBA | October 25, 1997 |
| 47 | 6 | Bret Hart (special guest) Corky and the Juice Pigs (musical guests) | November 1, 1997 |
| 48 | 7 | I Love Lucy (special guest) and Eddie Murphy (special guest) | November 8, 1997 |
| 49 | 8 | Daisy Fuentes (special guest), Gilbert Gottfried (special guest) | November 15, 1997 |
| 50 | 9 | Kerri Strug (special guest), Corky and the Juice Pigs (musical guests) | November 22, 1997 |
| 51 | 10 | Don Most (special guest) | December 6, 1997 |
| 52 | 11 | Howie Long (special guest) Corky and the Juice Pigs (musical guests) | December 13, 1997 |
| 53 | 12 | Pam Grier (host) and Corky and the Juice Pigs (musical guests) | January 3, 1998 |
| 54 | 13 | La Toya Jackson (special guest) | January 10, 1998 |
| 55 | 14 | Tony Little, Ahmet Zappa, Dweezil Zappa | January 17, 1998 |
| 56 | 15 | TBA | January 31, 1998 |
| 57 | 16 | Mark Hamill (special guest) and Corky and the Juice Pigs (musical guests) | February 7, 1998 |
| 58 | 17 | Jerry Springer (host), Mark Hamill (special guest) | February 28, 1998 |
| 59 | 18 | Phyllis Diller (special guest) and Corky and the Juice Pigs (musical guest) | March 7, 1998 |
| 60 | 19 | Phyllis Diller (special guest) | March 14, 1998 |
| 61 | 20 | Anna Nicole Smith (special guest) | March 28, 1998 |
| 62 | 21 | Ashley Edner (special guest) | April 11, 1998 |
| 63 | 22 | Lou Diamond Phillips (host), Dylan and Cole Sprouse, and Corky and the Juice Pigs (musical guests) | April 25, 1998 |
| 64 | 23 | David Boreanaz (special guest) | May 2, 1998 |
| 65 | 24 | Corky and the Juice Pigs featuring Debra Wilson (musical guests) | May 9, 1998 |
| 66 | 25 | Halle Berry (host) | May 16, 1998 |

=== Season 4 (1998–99) ===
| No. overall | No. in season | Guest(s) | Original release date |
|---|---|---|---|
| 67 | 1 | Vivica A. Fox, Usher, Dylan and Cole Sprouse | September 12, 1998 |
| 68 | 2 | Jane Krakowski | September 19, 1998 |
| 69 | 3 | TBA | September 26, 1998 |
| 70 | 4 | TBA | October 3, 1998 |
| 71 | 5 | Gary Coleman, Kevin Sorbo | October 10, 1998 |
| 72 | 6 | KISS, Robert Englund | October 31, 1998 |
| 73 | 7 | TBA | November 7, 1998 |
| 74 | 8 | TBA | November 14, 1998 |
| 75 | 9 | TBA | November 21, 1998 |
| 76 | 10 | Shaquille O'Neal | December 5, 1998 |
| 77 | 11 | TBA | December 12, 1998 |
| 78 | 12 | TBA | January 9, 1999 |
| 79 | 13 | TBA | January 16, 1999 |
| 80 | 14 | TBA | January 30, 1999 |
| 81 | 15 | Bret "The Hitman" Hart | February 6, 1999 |
| 82 | 16 | Brian McKnight | February 13, 1999 |
| 83 | 17 | TBA | February 20, 1999 |
| 84 | 18 | Bret "The Hitman" Hart, Michael Buffer, Roddy Piper | February 27, 1999 |
| 85 | 19 | Keri Russell | March 13, 1999 |
| 86 | 20 | TBA | March 27, 1999 |
| 87 | 21 | TBA | April 10, 1999 |
| 88 | 22 | Jerry Springer | May 1, 1999 |
| 89 | 23 | TBA | May 8, 1999 |
| 90 | 24 | Donny Osmond | May 15, 1999 |
| 91 | 25 | TBA | May 22, 1999 |

=== Season 5 (1999–2000) ===
| No. overall | No. in season | Title | Guest(s) | Original release date |
|---|---|---|---|---|
| 92 | 1 | "Episode 1" | Lisa Loeb | September 25, 1999 |
| 93 | 2 | "Episode 2" | Busta Rhymes | October 2, 1999 |
| 94 | 3 | "Episode 3" | TBA | October 9, 1999 |
| 95 | 4 | "Episode 4" | TBA | October 16, 1999 |
| 96 | 5 | "Episode 5" | TBA | October 23, 1999 |
| 97 | 6 | "Episode 6" | Illeana Douglas | October 30, 1999 |
| 98 | 7 | "Episode 7" | Rebecca Gayheart, Martin Short, Bush | November 6, 1999 |
| 99 | 8 | "Episode 8" | Artie Lange, Mitch Pileggi | November 13, 1999 |
| 100 | 9 | "Episode 9" | TBA | November 20, 1999 |
| 101 | 10 | "Episode 10" | TBA | November 27, 1999 |
| 102 | 11 | "Episode 11" | Blondie | December 11, 1999 |
| 103 | 12 | "Episode 12" | 98 Degrees | January 8, 2000 |
| 104 | 13 | "Episode 13" | TBA | January 15, 2000 |
| 105 | 14 | "Episode 14" | Tim Robbins | January 29, 2000 |
| 106 | 15 | "Episode 15" | Todd Bridges, Carmen Electra, Mark Hamill, Third Eye Blind | February 5, 2000 |
| 107 | 16 | "Episode 16" | David James Elliott, Regis Philbin, Q-Tip | February 12, 2000 |
| 108 | 17 | "Episode 17" | Tyra Banks, Seth Green, Earth, Wind & Fire | February 19, 2000 |
| 109 | 18 | "Episode 18" | George Carlin, Tony Shalhoub, The Cure | February 26, 2000 |
| 110 | 19 | "Mad TV's Night at the Movies" | Marc Anthony | March 18, 2000 |
| 111 | 20 | "Episode 20" | Creed | April 8, 2000 |
| 112 | 21 | "Episode 21" | Judge Joe Brown | April 15, 2000 |
| 113 | 22 | "Episode 22" | David Arquette, Sting, Goo Goo Dolls | April 29, 2000 |
| 114 | 23 | "Episode 23" | Dennis Hopper, Garry Marshall, Susan Sarandon | May 6, 2000 |
| 115 | 24 | "Episode 24" | George Carlin, Catherine O'Hara, Tony Shalhoub | May 13, 2000 |
| 116 | 25 | "Episode 25" | Tyra Banks | May 20, 2000 |

=== Season 6 (2000–01) ===
| No. overall | No. in season | Title | Guest(s) | Original release date |
|---|---|---|---|---|
| 117 | 1 | "Episode 1" | Dave Holmes, Snoop Dogg, No Doubt | September 23, 2000 |
| 118 | 2 | "Episode 2" | Blythe Danner, Kathy Bates, Robert De Niro, Teri Polo | September 30, 2000 |
| 119 | 3 | "Episode 3" | Barenaked Ladies | October 21, 2000 |
| 120 | 4 | "Episode 4" | Snoop Dogg | October 28, 2000 |
| 121 | 5 | "Episode 5" | Chyna, Rebecca Herbst, Jacob Young, Jackie Zeman | November 4, 2000 |
| 122 | 6 | "Episode 6" | Mandy Moore | November 11, 2000 |
| 123 | 7 | "Episode 7" | Outkast | November 18, 2000 |
| 124 | 8 | "Episode 8" | Cypress Hill | November 25, 2000 |
| 125 | 9 | "Episode 9" | Richard Lewis | December 9, 2000 |
| 126 | 10 | "Episode 10" | Everclear | December 16, 2000 |
| 127 | 11 | "Episode 11" | Lennox Lewis | January 13, 2001 |
| 128 | 12 | "Episode 12" | Vitamin C | January 20, 2001 |
| 129 | 13 | "Episode 13" | TBA | January 27, 2001 |
| 130 | 14 | "Episode 14" | David Boreanaz, Incubus | February 3, 2001 |
| 131 | 15 | "Episode 15" | Seth Green, Susan Sarandon | February 10, 2001 |
| 132 | 16 | "Episode 16" | Dave Holmes, Freddie Prinze Jr., St. Lunatics | February 17, 2001 |
| 133 | 17 | "Episode 17" | Tony Hawk, Regis Philbin, Jay-Z | February 24, 2001 |
| 134 | 18 | "Episode 18" | O-Town, Green Day | March 10, 2001 |
| 135 | 19 | "Episode 19" | Patrick Fugit | March 24, 2001 |
| 136 | 20 | "Episode 20" | TBA | April 14, 2001 |
| 137 | 21 | "Episode 21" | TBA | April 21, 2001 |
| 138 | 22 | "Episode 22" | Tom Green, Green Day | April 28, 2001 |
| 139 | 23 | "Episode 23" | Ray Allen, Dwayne Johnson, Jay-Z, Memphis Bleek | May 5, 2001 |
| 140 | 24 | "Episode 24" | Cindy Margolis, Bob Newhart | May 12, 2001 |
| 141 | 25 | "Episode 25" | Chris Kirkpatrick | May 19, 2001 |
| 142 | 26 | "Episode 26" | TBA | May 26, 2001 |
| 143 | 27 | "Episode 27" | TBA | June 2, 2001 |
| 144 | 28 | "Episode 28" | TBA | June 9, 2001 |
| 145 | 29 | "Episode 29" | TBA | June 16, 2001 |
| 146 | 30 | "Episode 30" | TBA | June 23, 2001 |

=== Season 7 (2001–02) ===
| No. overall | No. in season | Title | Guest(s) | Original release date |
|---|---|---|---|---|
| 147 | 1 | "Episode 1" | Joyce Brothers, Jennifer Aniston | September 22, 2001 |
| 148 | 2 | "Episode 2" | TBA | September 29, 2001 |
| 149 | 3 | "Episode 3" | Alien Ant Farm | October 6, 2001 |
| 150 | 4 | "Episode 4" | Lance Bass, Emmanuelle Chriqui, Joey Fatone | October 20, 2001 |
| 151 | 5 | "Episode 5" | David Carradine, Drew Barrymore, Penny Marshall | November 10, 2001 |
| 152 | 6 | "Episode 6" | Todd Bridges, Mark-Paul Gosselaar, Christopher Titus, Jessica Simpson | November 17, 2001 |
| 153 | 7 | "Episode 7" | Michelle Trachtenberg, Blink 182 | November 24, 2001 |
| 154 | 8 | "Episode 8" | Brian McFayden | December 1, 2001 |
| 155 | 9 | "Episode 9" | Method Man, Redman, Triple H | December 8, 2001 |
| 156 | 10 | "Episode 10" | TBA | December 15, 2001 |
| 157 | 11 | "Episode 11" | Ja Rule | January 12, 2002 |
| 158 | 12 | "Episode 12" | Usher | January 26, 2002 |
| 159 | 13 | "Mad TV's Rockin' Super Bowl Eve Spectacular" | Amanda Bynes, Frankie Muniz, Andy Dick, Wu-Tang Clan | February 2, 2002 |
| 160 | 14 | "Episode 14" | Chris Klein, Rebecca Romijn | February 9, 2002 |
| 161 | 15 | "Episode 15" | Stone Cold Steve Austin, Martin Short | February 16, 2002 |
| 162 | 16 | "Episode 16" | Adam Carolla, DMX, Melissa Joan Hart, Jimmy Kimmel | February 23, 2002 |
| 163 | 17 | "Episode 17" | Danny Masterson, Wilmer Valderrama, Shakira | March 16, 2002 |
| 164 | 18 | "Episode 18" | Earthquake, Tara Reid | March 23, 2002 |
| 165 | 19 | "Episode 19" | Greg the Bunny, Insane Clown Posse, Master P | April 6, 2002 |
| 166 | 20 | "Episode 20" | TBA | April 13, 2002 |
| 167 | 21 | "Episode 21" | Melina Kanakaredes | April 20, 2002 |
| 168 | 22 | "Episode 22" | Preston Lacy, Chris Pontius, Steve-O, Jason Acuña, Tenacious D | April 27, 2002 |
| 169 | 23 | "Episode 23" | TBA | May 4, 2002 |
| 170 | 24 | "Episode 24" | Vivica A. Fox, Gay Men's Chorus of Los Angeles | May 11, 2002 |
| 171 | 25 | "Episode 25" | Method Man, RZA, Teri Garr, Eve Plumb | May 18, 2002 |

=== Season 8 (2002–03) ===
| No. overall | No. in season | Title | Guest(s) | Original release date |
|---|---|---|---|---|
| 172 | 1 | "Episode 1" | Paula Abdul, Randy Jackson, Kelly Clarkson, Ryan Seacrest, Brian Dunkleman | September 14, 2002 |
| 173 | 2 | "Episode 2" | Jay Mohr | September 21, 2002 |
| 174 | 3 | "Episode 3" | Jackie Chan | September 28, 2002 |
| 175 | 4 | "Episode 4" | Tony Hawk, WC, Xzibit | November 2, 2002 |
| 176 | 5 | "Episode 5" | Bryan Cranston, Ja Rule, Shaggy | November 9, 2002 |
| 177 | 6 | "Episode 6" | David Alan Grier, Jim Rome, The Strokes | November 16, 2002 |
| 178 | 7 | "Episode 7" | Mila Kunis, Danny Masterson, Jack Osbourne, Kelly Osbourne, Wilmer Valderrama | November 23, 2002 |
| 179 | 8 | "Episode 8" | Sum 41 | December 7, 2002 |
| 180 | 9 | "Episode 9" | Puddle of Mudd | December 14, 2002 |
| 181 | 10 | "Episode 10" | Bon Jovi | December 21, 2002 |
| 182 | 11 | "Episode 11" | Tommy Davidson, Queens of the Stone Age | January 18, 2003 |
| 183 | 12 | "Episode 12" | Anthony Anderson, Jillian Barberie, Jerry O'Connell | January 25, 2003 |
| 184 | 13 | "Episode 13" | Jamie Kennedy, St. Lunatics | February 1, 2003 |
| 185 | 14 | "Episode 14" | TBA | February 8, 2003 |
| 186 | 15 | "Episode 15" | Paul Hogan, Evan Marriott | February 15, 2003 |
| 187 | 16 | "Episode 16" | Andy Dick, Ryan Seacrest, Supergrass | February 22, 2003 |
| 188 | 17 | "Episode 17" | t.A.T.u. | March 8, 2003 |
| 189 | 18 | "Episode 18" | Eric Idle, Trish Stratus | March 15, 2003 |
| 190 | 19 | "Episode 19" | Tommy Davidson, Fred Willard | March 22, 2003 |
| 191 | 20 | "Episode 20" | OK Go | April 5, 2003 |
| 192 | 21 | "Episode 21" | Countess Vaughn, The Folksmen | April 12, 2003 |
| 193 | 22 | "Episode 22" | Mandy Moore, Godsmack | April 26, 2003 |
| 194 | 23 | "Episode 23" | Missy Elliott | May 3, 2003 |
| 195 | 24 | "Episode 24" | Tom Arnold | May 10, 2003 |
| 196 | 25 | "Episode 25" | Steve-O, Nicole Sullivan, Jason Acuña | May 17, 2003 |

=== Season 9 (2003–04) ===
| No. overall | No. in season | Title | Guest(s) | Original release date |
|---|---|---|---|---|
| 197 | 1 | "Episode 1" | Andy Dick, Mýa | September 13, 2003 |
| 198 | 2 | "Episode 2" | Phil LaMarr | September 20, 2003 |
| 199 | 3 | "Episode 3" | Don Cheadle | September 27, 2003 |
| 200 | 4 | "Episode 4" | Tony Hawk, Chingy | October 4, 2003 |
| 201 | 5 | "Episode 5" | Jessica Alba | November 1, 2003 |
| 202 | 6 | "Episode 6" | Orlando Jones, Artie Lange, Nicole Sullivan, Alex Borstein, Will Sasso, Tommy Davidson | November 8, 2003 |
| 203 | 7 | "Episode 7" | David Arquette | November 15, 2003 |
| 204 | 8 | "Episode 8" | Tom Bergeron, Kathy Griffin | November 22, 2003 |
| 205 | 9 | "Episode 9" | TBA | December 6, 2003 |
| 206 | 10 | "Episode 10" | John C. McGinley | December 13, 2003 |
| 207 | 11 | "Episode 11" | Sara Rue, Westside Connection | December 20, 2003 |
| 208 | 12 | "Episode 12" | Nicole Richie | January 10, 2004 |
| 209 | 13 | "Episode 13" | Shane Mosley, Jeff Probst, Nicole Sullivan | January 17, 2004 |
| 210 | 14 | "Episode 14" | Aisha Tyler, Ruben Studdard | February 7, 2004 |
| 211 | 15 | "Episode 15" | Snoop Dogg, Don "Magic" Juan | February 14, 2004 |
| 212 | 16 | "Episode 16" | Anna Faris | February 21, 2004 |
| 213 | 17 | "Episode 17" | Bill O'Reilly | February 28, 2004 |
| 214 | 18 | "Episode 18" | Chris Jericho, Eddie Guerrero, Kevin Smith, Trish Stratus, Big Show | March 13, 2004 |
| 215 | 19 | "Episode 19" | JC Chasez | March 20, 2004 |
| 216 | 20 | "Episode 20" | Elisha Cuthbert, Vanessa L. Williams | April 10, 2004 |
| 217 | 21 | "Episode 21" | Cedric the Entertainer | April 17, 2004 |
| 218 | 22 | "Episode 22" | Rachel Bilson, Adam Brody, Benjamin McKenzie | May 1, 2004 |
| 219 | 23 | "Episode 23" | Jennifer Coolidge, Frankie Muniz | May 8, 2004 |
| 220 | 24 | "Episode 24" | Tom Bergeron | May 15, 2004 |
| 221 | 25 | "Episode 25" | David Alan Grier, Fred Willard | May 22, 2004 |

=== Season 10 (2004–05) ===
| No. overall | No. in season | Title | Guest(s) | Original release date |
|---|---|---|---|---|
| 222 | 1 | "Episode 1" | Charla Faddoul, Mirna Hindoyan | September 18, 2004 |
| 223 | 2 | "Episode 2" | Amanda Beard, Kaitlin Sandeno | September 25, 2004 |
| 224 | 3 | "Episode 3" | Flavor Flav, Christina Milian, Joe Budden | October 2, 2004 |
| 225 | 4 | "Episode 4" | Jon Heder, Alanis Morissette | November 6, 2004 |
| 226 | 5 | "Episode 5" | Will Sasso, Marilyn Manson | November 13, 2004 |
| 227 | 6 | "Episode 6" | Bill Maher, Ja Rule | November 20, 2004 |
| 228 | 7 | "Episode 7" | Christopher Masterson, Danny Masterson | November 27, 2004 |
| 229 | 8 | "Episode 8" | Avril Lavigne | December 11, 2004 |
| 230 | 9 | "Episode 9" | Nelly | December 18, 2004 |
| 231 | 10 | "Episode 10" | The Hives | January 8, 2005 |
| 232 | 11 | "Episode 11" | Nicole Richie, The Donnas | January 22, 2005 |
| 233 | 12 | "Episode 12" | Alex Borstein, Terry Bradshaw, James Brown, Seth Green, Jimmy Johnson, Howie Long | February 5, 2005 |
| 234 | 13 | "Episode 13" | Nicole Sullivan, Debra Wilson | February 12, 2005 |
| 235 | 14 | "Episode 14" | Mo Collins, Susan Sarandon | February 19, 2005 |
| 236 | 15 | "Episode 15" | Colby Donaldson, Artie Lange, Jeff Probst | February 26, 2005 |
| 237 | 16 | "Episode 16" | TBA | March 12, 2005 |
| 238 | 17 | "Episode 17" | TBA | March 19, 2005 |
| 239 | 18 | "Episode 18" | TBA | April 9, 2005 |
| 240 | 19 | "Episode 19" | TBA | April 23, 2005 |
| 241 | 20 | "Episode 20" | Artie Lange | April 30, 2005 |
| 242 | 21 | "Episode 21" | Michael Cera, Tony Hale | May 7, 2005 |
| 243 | 22 | "Episode 22" | Ryan Reynolds, Debra Wilson | May 14, 2005 |
| 244 | 23 | "Episode 23" | Nicole Sullivan, Amber Tamblyn | May 21, 2005 |

=== Season 11 (2005–06) ===
| No. overall | No. in season | Title | Guest(s) | Original release date |
|---|---|---|---|---|
| 245 | 1 | "Episode 1" | OK Go | September 17, 2005 |
| 246 | 2 | "Episode 2" | TBA | September 24, 2005 |
| 247 | 3 | "Episode 3" | Eric Balfour, Pauly Shore, The Dandy Warhols | October 1, 2005 |
| 248 | 4 | "Episode 4" | Fred Willard | November 5, 2005 |
| 249 | 5 | "Episode 5" | Pamela Anderson | November 12, 2005 |
| 250 | 6 | "Episode 6" | Christopher Meloni | November 19, 2005 |
| 251 | 7 | "Episode 7" | John Cena | November 26, 2005 |
| 252 | 8 | "Episode 8" | Jeff Garlin | December 10, 2005 |
| 253 | 9 | "Episode 9" | Neil Patrick Harris | December 17, 2005 |
| 254 | 10 | "Episode 10" | Michael Rapaport | January 7, 2006 |
| 255 | 11 | "Episode 11" | TBA | January 14, 2006 |
| 256 | 12 | "Episode 12" | TBA | January 28, 2006 |
| 257 | 13 | "Episode 13" | Jaime Pressly | February 4, 2006 |
| 258 | 14 | "Episode 14" | Alyson Hannigan, Jeff Probst | February 18, 2006 |
| 259 | 15 | "Episode 15" | Jason Mraz | March 4, 2006 |
| 260 | 16 | "Episode 16" | John Cho, Louie Anderson | March 18, 2006 |
| 261 | 17 | "Episode 17" | John Leguizamo, Queen Latifah, Ray Romano | April 8, 2006 |
| 262 | 18 | "Episode 18" | TBA | April 15, 2006 |
| 263 | 19 | "Episode 19" | TBA | April 29, 2006 |
| 264 | 20 | "Episode 20" | TBA | May 6, 2006 |
| 265 | 21 | "Episode 21" | Kurt Busch | May 13, 2006 |
| 266 | 22 | "Episode 22" | TBA | May 20, 2006 |

=== Season 12 (2006–07) ===
| No. overall | No. in season | Title | Guest(s) | Original release date |
|---|---|---|---|---|
| 267 | 1 | "Episode 1" | Dwayne "The Rock" Johnson, Xzibit | September 16, 2006 |
| 268 | 2 | "Episode 2" | Howie Mandel, Chingy | September 23, 2006 |
| 269 | 3 | "Episode 3" | John Cena, Martin Short | September 30, 2006 |
| 270 | 4 | "Episode 4" | Nelly Furtado | November 4, 2006 |
| 271 | 5 | "Episode 5" | Seth MacFarlane, Eva Longoria | November 11, 2006 |
| 272 | 6 | "Episode 6" | Matthew Broderick, Danny DeVito, Kristin Davis | November 18, 2006 |
| 273 | 7 | "Episode 7" | TBA | November 25, 2006 |
| 274 | 8 | "Episode 8" | TBA | December 9, 2006 |
| 275 | 9 | "Episode 9" | Jeff Probst | December 16, 2006 |
| 276 | 10 | "Episode 10" | Los Angeles Kings | January 6, 2007 |
| 277 | 11 | "Episode 11" | Carmen Electra | January 20, 2007 |
| 278 | 12 | "Episode 12" | Shawne Merriman, Mary Lynn Rajskub | February 3, 2007 |
| 279 | 13 | "Episode 13" | Kate Walsh | February 10, 2007 |
| 280 | 14 | "Episode 14" | TBA | February 17, 2007 |
| 281 | 15 | "Episode 15" | Danny Bonaduce | February 24, 2007 |
| 282 | 16 | "Episode 16" | Rob Corddry | March 10, 2007 |
| 283 | 17 | "Episode 17" | Edge | March 17, 2007 |
| 284 | 18 | "Episode 18" | Tom Bergeron, Efren Ramirez | April 7, 2007 |
| 285 | 19 | "Episode 19" | Jamie Kennedy | April 14, 2007 |
| 286 | 20 | "Episode 20" | Leah Remini, Michael Rapaport, Verne Troyer | April 28, 2007 |
| 287 | 21 | "Episode 21" | Carl Edwards, Tito Ortiz, Ben Donovan | May 5, 2007 |
| 288 | 22 | "Episode 22" | Fred Willard | May 19, 2007 |

=== Season 13 (2007–08) ===
| No. overall | No. in season | Title | Guest(s) | Original release date |
|---|---|---|---|---|
| 289 | 1 | "Mad TV Ruined My Life: The Sketches That Shocked a Nation" | Jerry Springer | September 15, 2007 |
| 290 | 2 | "Mad TV's All-Time Best TV Parodies" | Jeff Probst | September 22, 2007 |
| 291 | 3 | "I Want My Mad TV" | Perez Hilton | September 29, 2007 |
| 292 | 4 | "Mad TV's Most Wanted" | Susan Sarandon | October 6, 2007 |
| 293 | 5 | "Episode 5" | Carlos Mencia | November 3, 2007 |
| 294 | 6 | "Episode 6" | Joey Fatone | November 10, 2007 |
| 295 | 7 | "Episode 7" | Mo Collins, Debra Wilson, Steve Byrne | November 17, 2007 |
| 296 | 8 | "Episode 8" | Kathy Griffin, Jon Reep | November 24, 2007 |
| 297 | 9 | "Episode 9" | Serena Williams | February 2, 2008 |
| 298 | 10 | "Episode 10" | TBA | February 9, 2008 |
| 299 | 11 | "Episode 11" | TBA | February 16, 2008 |
| 300 | 12 | "Episode 12" | TBA | March 29, 2008 |
| 301 | 13 | "Episode 13" | Kat Von D, Hugh Laurie, Chris Evans, Cedric the Entertainer | April 5, 2008 |
| 302 | 14 | "Episode 14" | Neil Patrick Harris | April 19, 2008 |
| 303 | 15 | "Episode 15" | Dominic Monaghan | April 26, 2008 |
| 304 | 16 | "Episode 16" | Dave Navarro | May 17, 2008 |

=== Season 14 (2008–09) ===
| No. overall | No. in season | Title | Guest(s) | Original release date |
|---|---|---|---|---|
| 305 | 1 | "Episode 1" | Jerry O'Connell | September 13, 2008 |
| 306 | 2 | "Episode 2" | Chris Rose, Judge Joe Brown, Audrina Patridge, Zachary Gordon | September 20, 2008 |
| 307 | 3 | "Episode 3" | TBA | September 27, 2008 |
| 308 | 4 | "Mad TV: Sexy, Dirty Politics" | TBA | October 4, 2008 |
| 309 | 5 | "Episode 5" | Ne-Yo | November 1, 2008 |
| 310 | 6 | "Episode 6" | Jeff Probst | November 8, 2008 |
| 311 | 7 | "Episode 7" | Serena Williams | November 15, 2008 |
| 312 | 8 | "Episode 8" | TBA | November 22, 2008 |
| 313 | 9 | "Mad TV's Best of Holiday Sketches Spectacularly Special Spectacular" | TBA | December 13, 2008 |
| 314 | 10 | "Episode 10" | TBA | February 28, 2009 |
| 315 | 11 | "Episode 11" | Jerry Springer | March 7, 2009 |
| 316 | 12 | "Episode 12" | Kim Kardashian, Khloé Kardashian, Kourtney Kardashian, Kris Jenner, Bruce Jenner, Tila Tequila | March 14, 2009 |
| 317 | 13 | "Mad TV's Best of Michael McDonald Special" | Kathy Griffin, Michael McDonald | March 21, 2009 |
| 318 | 14 | "Episode 14" | Tommy Chong, Cheech Marin | March 28, 2009 |
| 319 | 15 | "Episode 15" | TBA | April 11, 2009 |
| 320 | 16 | "Episode 16" | TBA | April 25, 2009 |
| 321 | 17 | "Episode 17" | Fred Willard, Alex Borstein, Mo Collins, Artie Lange, Will Sasso, Debra Wilson | May 16, 2009 |

=== Season 15 (2016) ===
| No. overall | No. in season | Title | Original release date | US viewers (millions) |
|---|---|---|---|---|
| 322 | 1 | "Episode 1" | July 26, 2016 | 0.81 |
| 323 | 2 | "Episode 2" | August 2, 2016 | 0.67 |
| 324 | 3 | "Episode 3" | August 9, 2016 | 0.60 |
| 325 | 4 | "Episode 4" | August 23, 2016 | 0.66 |
| 326 | 5 | "Episode 5" | August 30, 2016 | 0.70 |
| 327 | 6 | "Episode 6" | September 6, 2016 | 0.68 |
| 328 | 7 | "Episode 7" | September 20, 2016 | 0.58 |
| 329 | 8 | "Episode 8" | September 27, 2016 | 0.55 |

== See also ==
- List of Mad TV cast members
