= The Bastard (miniseries) =

- Genre: Historical fiction Drama; Romance
- Based on: The Bastard (novel) by John Jakes
- Written by: John Jakes; Guerdon Trueblood
- Directed by: Lee H. Katzin
- Starring: Andrew Stevens; Tom Bosley; Kim Cattrall
- Narrated by: Raymond Burr
- Theme music composer: John Addison
- Country of origin: United States
- Original language: English

Production
- Executive producer: John Wilder
- Producer: Joe Byrne
- Cinematography: Michel Hugo
- Editors: Michael Murphy; Robert F. Shugrue
- Running time: 240 minutes
- Production company: Universal Television

Original release
- Network: Syndication
- Release: May 22 – May 23, 1978

The Bastard is a 1978 American two-part, four-hour made-for-television drama film based on the 1974 historical novel, The Bastard, written by John Jakes. It is the first story in a series known as The Kent Family Chronicles or the American Bicentennial Series. The novel mixes fictional characters with historical events or people, to tell the story of the United States of America in the time period leading up to the American Revolution. The novel was adapted into this four-hour television film in May 1978.

The movie was nominated for a Golden Globe Award in 1979 for Best Motion Picture Made for TV, with two Daytime Emmy Award nominations for Outstanding Achievement in Costume Design for a Drama Special and Outstanding Art Direction for a Dramatic Special.

The Bastard was followed by The Rebels, second in the series, and then The Seekers, third in the series.

== Synopsis ==
Phillipe Charboneau is the illegitimate son of an English duke. When he travels from France to England to claim his inheritance, he incurs the wrath of his father's family and is forced to flee to America, where he becomes involved in the events leading to the American Revolution.

== Cast ==
- Andrew Stevens — Philippe Charbonneau/Philip Kent
- Tom Bosley — Benjamin Franklin
- Kim Cattrall — Anne Ware
- Buddy Ebsen — Benjamin Edes
- Lorne Greene — Bishop Francis
- Olivia Hussey — Alicia
- Cameron Mitchell — Capt. Plummer
- Harry Morgan — Capt. Caleb
- Patricia Neal — Marie Charboneau
- Eleanor Parker — Lady Amberly
- Donald Pleasence — Solomon Sholto
- William Shatner — Paul Revere
- John de Lancie - Lt. Stark
- Barry Sullivan — Abraham Ware
- Noah Beery Jr. — Dan O'Brien
- Peter Bonerz - Girard
- John Colicos - Lord North
- William Daniels - Samuel Adams
- Stephen Furst - Bertrand
- James Gregory - Will Campbell
- Alan Napier - Dr. Bleeker
- Russell Johnson - Col. James Barrett
- Keenan Wynn - Johnny Malcolm
- James Whitmore Jr. - Esau Sholto
- Alex Henteloff - Henry Knox
- Ike Eisenmann - Marquis de Lafayette
- Raymond Burr — Narrator (voice)
