= Tower Publications =

Defunct American publisher

- Status: defunct 1982; 43 years ago
- Founded: June 2, 1958; 66 years ago
- Country of origin: United States
- Headquarters location: 500 Fifth Avenue, New York City
- Key people: Louis Silberkleit, Harry Shorten
- Publication types: Books, Comic books
- Nonfiction topics: History, Religion, Sociology
- Fiction genres: Erotic literature, Science Fiction, Horror, Mystery
- Imprints: Midwood Books; Tower Books; Tower Comics; Belmont Tower

Tower Publications was an American publisher based in New York City that operated from 1958 to 1982. Originally known for their Midwood Books line of erotic men's fiction, it also published science fiction and fantasy under its Tower Books line and published comic books in the late 1960s under its Tower Comics imprint. In the early 1970s, Tower acquired paperback publisher Belmont Books, forming the Belmont Tower line. Archie Comics' cofounder Louis Silberkleit was a silent partner in Tower's ownership; longtime Archie editor Harry Shorten was a major figure with Tower in all its iterations.

== History ==
Tower Publications was formed on June 2, 1958. The company's first publications were cheap paperbacks in Midwood Books's numbered erotic Midwood line, aimed at male readers. (Many of the titles were branded as Midwood-Tower Publications.) The covers of many Midwood Books featured works by prolific illustrators of the era, including Paul Rader; authors published by Midwood (mostly using pseudonyms) included Lawrence Block, Donald Westlake, Robert Silverberg, and Richard E. Geis.

From 1965 to 1969, Tower ran a comic book division, Tower Comics, which was mostly run by cartoonists Wally Wood and Samm Schwartz. Tower is most well known for Wood's own T.H.U.N.D.E.R. Agents; besides Wood and Schwartz, notable creators associated with Tower included Dan Adkins, Gil Kane, Reed Crandall, Steve Ditko, Richard Bassford, Len Brown, Steve Skeates, Larry Ivie, Bill Pearson, Russ Jones, and Roger Brand. Tower Comics went defunct in 1969.

Tower Publications' Tower Books line published science fiction and fantasy from 1965 to 1982. Writer Gardner Fox produced between thirteen and twenty-five "Lady from L.U.S.T." (League of Undercover Spies and Terrorists) novels for Tower (and later Belmont Tower) between 1968 and 1975 using the name "Rod Gray".

In 1971, Tower acquired the assets of Belmont Books, merging the two companies to form Belmont Tower. (Belmont had been founded by all three Archie Comic Publications founders: Silberkleit, John L. Goldwater, and Maurice Coyne.) Although the new line continued to publish fiction, Belmont Tower published many notable nonfiction books from 1971 to 1980. Authors who published with Belmont Tower included Paulette Cooper, Ovid Demaris, Gardner Fox (writing as Rod Gray), Firth Haring Fabend, Hans Holzer, T. V. Olsen, and Harry Turtledove.

Tower ceased publishing in 1982; the company officially went out of business in January 2012, long after it had ceased operations.

== Selected titles published ==
=== Tower Comics (1965–1969) ===
- Fight the Enemy (3 issues, Aug. 1966–Mar. 1967) — war title
- T.H.U.N.D.E.R. Agents (20 issues, Nov. 1965–Nov. 1969) — and spin-off titles:
  - Dynamo (4 issues, Aug. 1966–June 1967)
  - NoMan (2 issues, Nov. 1966–Mar. 1967)
- Undersea Agent (6 issues, Jan. 1966–Mar. 1967) — minimal ties with T.H.U.N.D.E.R. Agents
- Tippy Teen (27 issues, Nov. 1965–Oct. 1969) — teen comics; includes the unnumbered Tippy Teen Special Collector's Edition (Nov. 1969); and spin-off titles:
  - Teen-in (4 issues, Summer 1968–Fall 1969)
  - Tippy's Friends Go-go and Animal / Tippy's Friend Go-Go (15 issues, Aug. 1966–Oct. 1969)

==== Paperback collections (published by Tower Books) ====
- Dynamo, Man of High Camp (Tower Book 42-660) 1966 — reprints T.H.U.N.D.E.R. Agents #1
- NoMan, the Invisible THUNDER Agent (Tower Book 42-672) 1966 — reprints NoMan stories from T.H.U.N.D.E.R. Agents #2-5
- Menthor, the T.H.U.N.D.E.R. Agent with the Super Helmet (Tower Book 42-674) 1966 — reprints Menthor stories from T.H.U.N.D.E.R. Agents #2-5
- The Terrific Trio (Tower Book 42-687) 1966 — reprints stories T.H.U.N.D.E.R. Agents #2, 3, 6

=== Tower Books (1965–1982) ===
- Rod Gray (Gardner Fox). The Lady from L.U.S.T. series:
  - The Lady From L.U.S.T. [aka 'Lust, Be A Lady Tonight'] (Tower Book 43-804) (1967)
  - Lay Me Odds (Tower Book 43-860) (1967)
  - The 69 Pleasures (Tower Book 43-912) (1967)
  - Five Beds To Mecca (Tower Book 43-944) (1968)
  - The Hot Mahatma (Tower Book 44-989) (1968)
  - To Russia With L.U.S.T. (Tower Book 44-126) (1968)
  - Kiss My Assassin (Tower Book 44-160) (1968)
  - South of the Bordello (Tower Book 44-171) (1968)
  - The Poisoned Pussy (Tower Book 45-212) (1968)
  - The Big Snatch (Tower Book 45-276) (1970)
  - Lady In Heat (Tower Book 45-299) (1970)

=== Belmont-Tower (1971–1980) ===
- Cooper, Paulette. The Scandal of Scientology (1971)
- Curzon, Sam. Legs Diamond (1973)
- Demaris, Ovid. The Lucky Luciano Story (The Godfather series) (1974)
- Fabend, Firth Haring. Three Women (1972)
- Gray, Rod (Gardner Fox). The Lady from L.U.S.T. series:
  - Laid in the Future (1970)
  - Blow My Mind (1971)
  - Turned On to Lust (1971)
  - Skin Game Dame (1972)
  - Go For Broke (1975)
  - Have a Snort! (1975)
  - Target for Tonight (1975)
  - The Maracaibo Affair (1975)
  - Voodoo Kill (1975)
  - The Lady Killer (1975)
  - Kill Her With Love (1975)
- Hanna, David. Harvest of Horror: Mass Murder in Houston (1975)
- Holzer, Hans. Murder in Amityville (1979)
- Olsen, T. V. Starbuck's Brand (1974)
- Peterson, Harold. The Last of the Mountain Men (1975) — re-issue of book originally published by Charles Scribner's Sons
- Shorten, Harry. There Oughta be a Law (1976)
- John Jakes:
  - Brak the Barbarian (Apr. 1981) — re-issue of 1968 book originally published by Avon Books
  - Brak vs. the Mark of the Demons (1981) — re-issue of 1969 book originally published by Paperback Library
  - Brak vs. the Sorceress (1981) — re-issue of 1969 book originally published as Witch of the Four Winds by Paperback Library
- Sam Moskowitz and Roger Elwood, editors. The Time Curve (1968) — anthology of science fiction short stories
- Greg Tobin: Season of Power (co-authored with Sam Tanenhaus) (1981)
