= Kim Cattrall =

British and Canadian actress (born 1956)

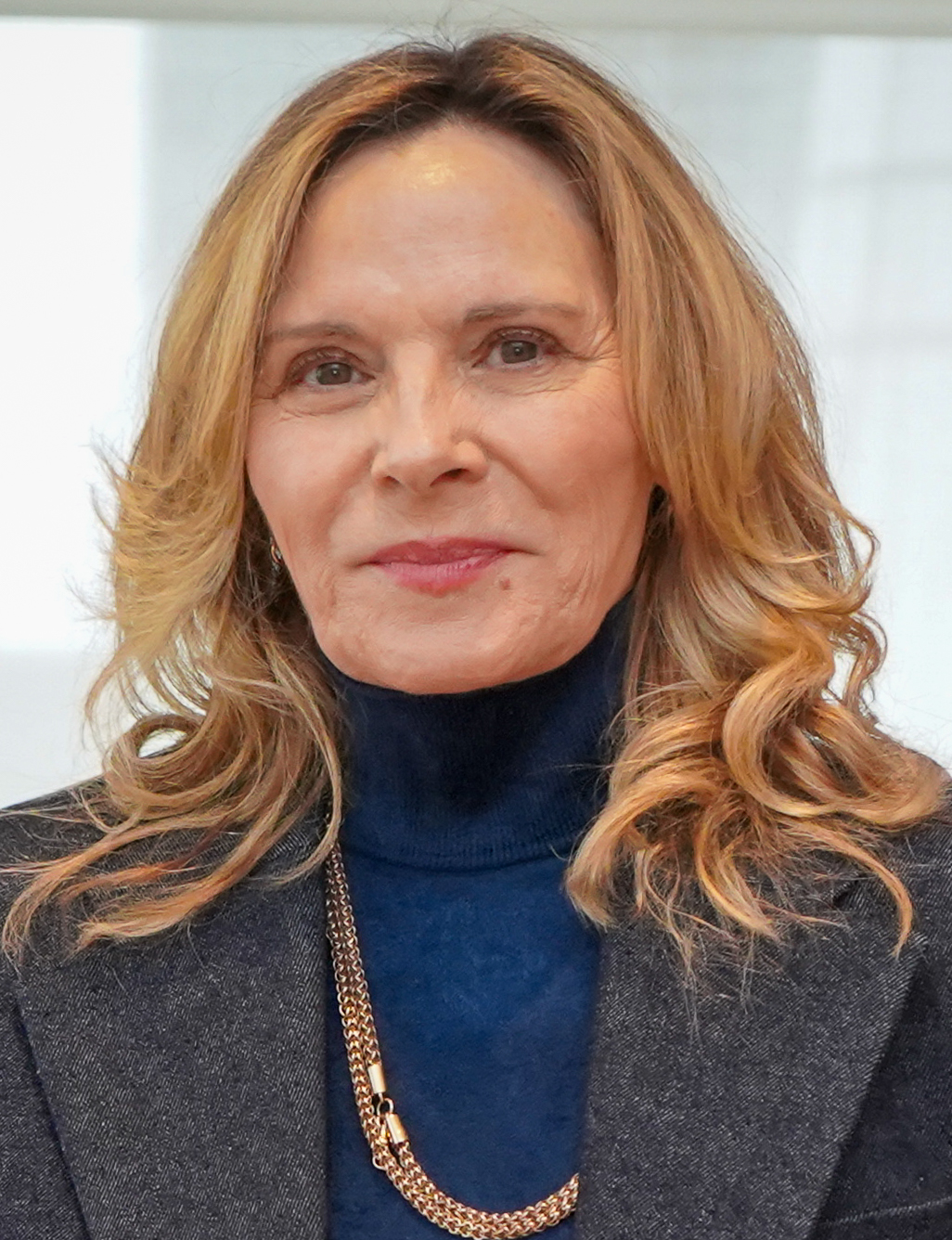
- Cattrall in 2024
- Born: Kim Victoria Cattrall; 21 August 1956 (age 70); Liverpool, England
- Citizenship: United Kingdom (by birthplace); Canada (naturalized as child); United States (naturalized 2020)
- Education: American Academy of Dramatic Arts
- Occupations: Actress; producer
- Years active: 1975–present
- Spouses: Larry Davis (m. 1977; ann. 1979) Andre J. Lyson (m. 1982; div. 1989) Mark Levinson (m. 1998; div. 2004) Russell Thomas (m. 2025)
- Awards: Full list

Kim Victoria Cattrall (/kəˈtræl/; born 21 August 1956) is a British and Canadian actress. She is known for her portrayal of Samantha Jones on HBO's Sex and the City (1998–2004), for which she received five Primetime Emmy Award nominations and four Golden Globe Award nominations, winning Best Supporting Actress. She reprised the role in the feature films Sex and the City (2008) and Sex and the City 2 (2010), and made a cameo appearance on its revival And Just Like That... in 2023.

Cattrall made her film debut in Rosebud (1975) and went on to appear opposite Jack Lemmon in Tribute (1980) and in Ticket to Heaven (1981). She came to prominence with roles in films such as Porky's (1982), Police Academy (1984), Big Trouble in Little China (1986), Mannequin (1987), Masquerade (1988), and Star Trek VI: The Undiscovered Country (1991). She is also known for her theatre work including Wild Honey (Broadway, 1986), Miss Julie (McCarter Theatre, 1993), Private Lives (West End, 2010), Antony and Cleopatra (Liverpool Playhouse, 2010), and Sweet Bird of Youth (The Old Vic, 2013).

From 2014 to 2016, Cattrall starred on and served as executive producer of HBO Canada's Sensitive Skin, for which she received a nomination for the 2016 Canadian Screen Award for Best Actress in a Comedy Series. She went on to star on the Paramount+ series Tell Me a Story (2018–2019), the Fox series Filthy Rich (2020), the Peacock revival series Queer as Folk (2022), and the Netflix series Glamorous (2023). From 2022 to 2023, she played "future" Sophie on the Hulu sitcom How I Met Your Father.

== Early life ==
Kim Victoria Cattrall was born on 21 August 1956 in the Mossley Hill area of Liverpool, to British parents; secretary Gladys Shane (née Baugh; 1929–2022) and construction engineer Dennis Cattrall (1925–2012). She has two sisters and a brother, Christopher Cattrall (1963–2018). When she was three months old, her family emigrated to Canada and settled in Courtenay, British Columbia. At age 11, she returned to Liverpool when her grandmother became sick. She took acting examinations at the London Academy of Music and Dramatic Art, before moving to New York City at the age of 16 for her first acting role.

== Career ==
=== 1970s–2000s ===
Cattrall began her career after graduating from Georges P. Vanier Secondary School in 1972, when she left Canada for the US. She attended the American Academy of Dramatic Arts in New York, and upon her graduation signed a five-year film deal with director Otto Preminger. She made her film debut in Preminger's action thriller Rosebud (1975). A year later, Universal Studios bought out that contract and Cattrall became one of the last participants in the contract player system of Universal (also referenced as MCA/Universal during this period) before the system ended in 1981. The Universal system's representative in New York, Eleanor Kilgallen (sister of Dorothy Kilgallen), cast Cattrall in numerous television guest-star roles. One of the first jobs Kilgallen got her was in a 1977 episode of Quincy, M.E. starring Jack Klugman, whom Kilgallen also represented.

In 1978, Cattrall played the house guest of a murderous psychologist in an episode of Columbo, and was in "Blindfold", an episode of the 1970s action series Starsky & Hutch, in which Starsky (played by Paul Michael Glaser) is grief-stricken because he accidentally blinded Cattrall's character, young artist Emily Harrison, by a shot of his gun. She appeared in The Bastard (1978) and The Rebels (1979), two television miniseries based on the John Jakes novels of the same names. In 1979, she played the role of Gabrielle White on The Incredible Hulk and would go down in television Hulk lore as one of the few characters who knew David Banner (alter ego of the title character) was alive and was the creature. Her work in television paid off and she quickly made the transition to cinema. She appeared opposite Jack Lemmon in his Oscar-nominated film Tribute (1980), and in Crossbar, the film about a high jumper who loses his leg and still participates in the Olympic trials, with Cattrall's help. The following year, she appeared in Ticket to Heaven.

In 1981, Cattrall played PE teacher Miss Honeywell in Porky's, followed three years later by a role in Police Academy. In 1985, she starred in three films: Turk 182, City Limits and Hold-Up, the last with French star Jean-Paul Belmondo. In 1986, she played Kurt Russell's love interest in the action film Big Trouble in Little China. In 1987, her lead role in the cult comedy film Mannequin proved a huge success with audiences. One of her best-known film roles is that of Lieutenant Valeris in Star Trek VI: The Undiscovered Country; Cattrall assisted in developing the character by designing her own hairstyle and even helped come up with the name. Aside from her film work, Cattrall is also a stage actress, with performances in Arthur Miller's A View from the Bridge and Anton Chekhov's Three Sisters and Wild Honey to her credit. In addition, she can be heard reading the poetry of Rupert Brooke on the CD Red Rose Music SACD Sampler Volume One.

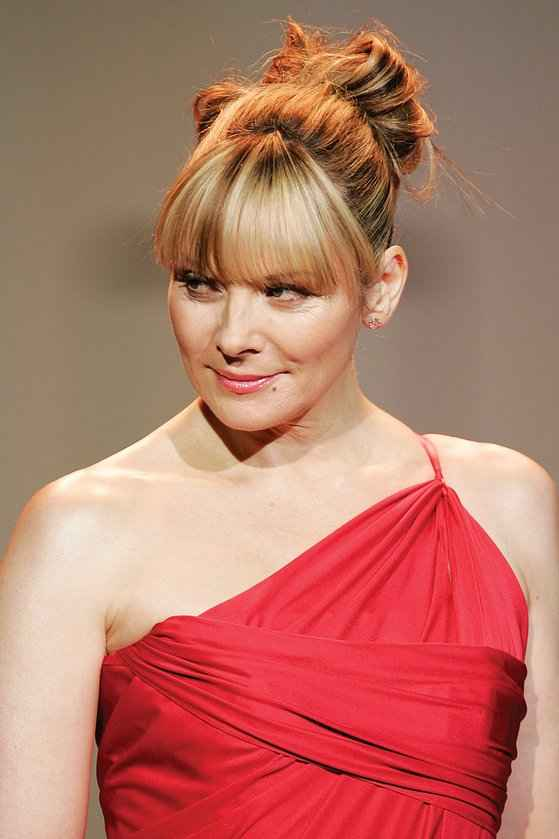
Cattrall in 2007

In 1997, she was cast in Sex and the City, Darren Star's series which was broadcast on HBO. As Samantha Jones, Cattrall gained international recognition. She capitalized on her success by appearing in steamy television commercials promoting Pepsi One. Sex and the City ran for six seasons and ended as a weekly series in spring 2004 with 10.6 million viewers. Cattrall reprised the role of Samantha Jones in the 2008 Sex and the City film, as well as the 2010 sequel Sex and the City 2. For her role on the television series, she was nominated for five Emmy Awards, and four Golden Globe Awards, winning one in 2002. She also won two ensemble Screen Actors Guild Awards, shared with her co-stars Sarah Jessica Parker, Kristin Davis and Cynthia Nixon, although she later revealed she never got along with them. She was ranked number eight in TV Guide's 50 sexiest stars of all-time list in 2005. In 2008 she was honoured by the Cosmopolitan UK Ultimate Women Of The Year Awards with the Ultimate Icon Award. She was also awarded the NBC Universal Canada Award of Distinction at the 2008 Banff World TV Festival.

In 2005, she appeared in the Disney film Ice Princess, in which she played Tina Harwood, ice skating coach of the film's lead character. She portrayed Claire, a paralysed woman who wants to die, in the West End drama revival of Whose Life Is It Anyway?. She appeared to rave reviews in a 2006 West End production of David Mamet's The Cryptogram at the Donmar Warehouse in London. She appeared in a number of British television commercials for Tetley Tea from 2005, as well as ads for Bacardi's Island Breeze cocktails. In 2006, a commercial for Nissan cars, which featured Cattrall as Samantha Jones, was withdrawn from New Zealand television, apparently because of complaints about its innuendo. She later starred alongside Brendan Gleeson in John Boorman's film The Tiger's Tail (2006), a black comedy that focuses on the impact of the Celtic Tiger economy on Irish people. On ITV, she starred alongside David Haig, Daniel Radcliffe and Carey Mulligan in My Boy Jack, the story of author Rudyard Kipling's search for his son lost in the First World War.

=== 2010s–2019 ===
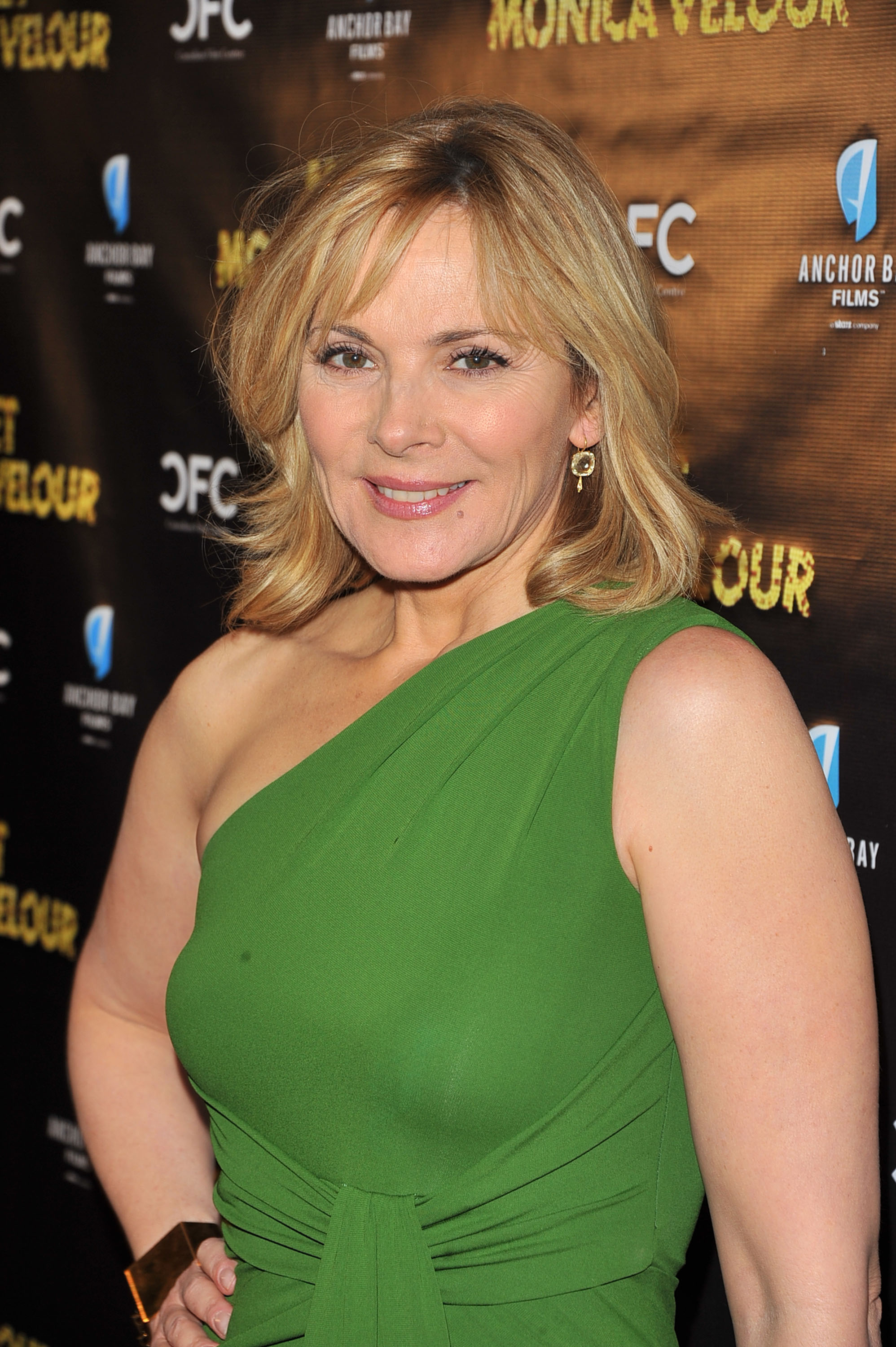
Cattrall in 2011

Cattrall played Amelia Bly in Roman Polanski's well-received The Ghost Writer (2010) and voiced the character Dee in the Canadian adult animated sitcom Producing Parker, the latter, for which she was awarded a Gemini for Best Performance in an Animated Program or Series. Cattrall has a star on Canada's Walk of Fame in Toronto. While filming Sex and the City 2 in Marrakesh, she took part in a seminar, 'Being directed' with director John Boorman as part of the third edition of the Arts in Marrakech Festival. Cattrall acted opposite Matthew Macfadyen in a 2010 revival of Noël Coward's play Private Lives at the Vaudeville Theatre on London's West End, for which she received a Whats on Stage nomination for Best Actress." In the same year, Cattrall starred as Gloria Scabius (alongside Macfadyen once again) in Channel 4 adaptation of William Boyd's novel Any Human Heart.

Cattrall played Cleopatra in a 2010 production of Antony and Cleopatra, directed by Janet Suzman, opposite Jeffery Kissoon as Anthony, in Liverpool at the Playhouse, with a subsequent revival at Chichester Festival Theatre (with Michael Pennington as Anthony) in 2012. In 2010, Cattrall was named an Honorary Fellow of Liverpool John Moores University in recognition of her contributions to the dramatic arts. In 2011, Cattrall reprised her role as Amanda in a production of Private Lives opposite Canadian actor Paul Gross in Toronto and on Broadway. The New York Times theatre critic raved about Cattrall's performance and she received a Drama League Award nomination. That year, Cattrall also appeared in Uptown Downstairs Abbey, the Comic Relief parody of the historical television dramas Downton Abbey and Upstairs, Downstairs. Playing Lady Grantham, she starred alongside Jennifer Saunders, Joanna Lumley, Victoria Wood, Harry Enfield, Patrick Barlow, Dale Winton, Olivia Colman, Tim Vine, Simon Callow, Michael Gambon and Harry Hill.

In 2013, Cattrall starred in the Old Vic's production of Tennessee Williams's Sweet Bird of Youth, directed by Olivier Award-winner Marianne Elliott. In 2014, she starred in and executive produced HBO Canada's Sensitive Skin, an adaptation of the 2005 British series. In 2015, the show was nominated for an International Emmy Award. The show was nominated for numerous Canadian Screen Awards with Cattrall receiving a nomination in 2017 for her role as Davina Jackson in the series. The show is now available for streaming on Netflix.

Cattrall was originally cast in the title role of Linda in a 2015 play by Penelope Skinner, to be directed by Michael Longhurst and produced at London's Royal Court Theatre. She was forced to drop out of that production a few days before the opening, due to "chronic, debilitating insomnia". She returned to New York and started a program of cognitive behaviour therapy to train herself to be able to sleep better. The therapy was successful; it included developing certain evening rituals, removing electronic devices from her bedroom, and limiting the use of the bed to two activities, one of which would be sleeping. Meanwhile, for the scheduled opening of Skinner's play, actress Noma Dumezweni took over the role to much acclaim and publicity. Cattrall opened up to the BBC Woman's Hour on her insomnia journey and how she was able to manage it. Cattrall later returned that year to guest edit the BBC's Woman's Hour to discuss "Choosing to Be Child Free" and "Being a Parent Without Giving Birth" which raised controversial response and opinions. She was also seen in 2015 on the SkyArts short Ruby Robinson, a physical comedy where Cattrall starred as Ruby, a woman living with a troupe of unusual acrobat helpers, who is taught a valuable lesson by her nephew.

Cattrall took part in the BBC Arts' I'm with the Banned, the flagship event in Belarus Free Theatre's (BFT) tenth-anniversary celebrations. Commissioned by The Space, the concert took place at London's KOKO and was broadcast worldwide. Radical underground company BFT brought together a unique line-up of musicians and performers to stand up for artistic freedom of expression and against injustice.

In 2016, Cattrall starred in the BBC mini-series The Witness for the Prosecution based on the Agatha Christie short story. The celebrated two part mini-series was nominated for a 2017 BAFTA award for "Best Mini-Series." In 2017, Cattrall also joined the cast of the hit Swedish TV show Modus, playing the President of the United States. Modus first aired in Sweden in 2015 and was later broadcast by BBC Four in the UK. The show also airs in Canada, Australia, France and Japan and is handled by FremantleMedia International. From 2018 to 2019, Cattrall starred on the Paramount+ series Tell Me a Story.

=== 2020s–present ===
In 2020, Cattrall starred on the Fox drama Filthy Rich, where she played Margaret Monreaux, the matriarch of a Southern family which has become mega-rich and famous for creating a wildly successful Christian television network. After her husband dies in a plane crash, Margaret and family are stunned to learn that he fathered three illegitimate children, all of whom are written into his will — threatening their family name and fortune. Cattrall also served as a producer on the series. Cattrall was honoured at the 2020 Atlanta TV festival with the Icon Award for the show.

Development began on a revival of Sex and the City following the cancellation of a third film adaptation. Catrall previously expressed that she did not want to return for the third film due to disagreeing with its planned storylines, involving killing off Mr. Big, and Samantha receiving nude pictures from Miranda's 14-year-old son, Brady. The series revival titled And Just Like That... premiered in 2021. In 2022, Sarah Jessica Parker spoke on The Hollywood Reporter's Award Chatter podcast about why Cattrall wasn't asked to be a part of the revival. She stated, "We did not ask her to be part of this because she made it clear that that wasn't something she wanted to pursue, and it no longer felt comfortable for us, and so it didn't occur to us". In 2023, however, Catrall reprised her role as Samantha for a brief cameo for the season 2 finale.

In 2021, Cattrall was cast in the How I Met Your Mother spin-off series, How I Met Your Father led by Hilary Duff, in the pivotal narrator role originated by Bob Saget. The series ran for two seasons. She joined Robert De Niro in the comedy film About My Father (2023) inspired by the life of stand-up comedian Sebastian Maniscalco, who also stars. Cattrall featured prominently in the permanent exhibition Wondrous Place celebrating Liverpool's cultural heritage. In 2022, she starred on the Peacock revival series Queer as Folk. In 2023, Cattrall starred on the Netflix series Glamorous.

== Personal life ==
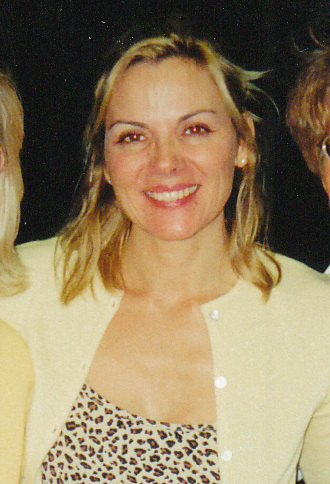
Cattrall at the HBO party after the 1999 Emmy Awards

Cattrall has held dual British and Canadian citizenship for most of her life and became an American citizen in 2020 in order to vote in that year's election. Cattrall does not drink alcohol, saying that, "I'm not a big drinker and when I do, I get a headache." On 21 December 1988, Cattrall was booked on the Pan Am Flight 103 that was destroyed by a bomb while flying over the Scottish town of Lockerbie. The attack killed all 243 passengers but, a day prior, Cattrall had re-arranged her schedule to fly later that evening so she could shop at Harrods.

=== Family and relationships ===
In 2009, Cattrall took part in the BBC One documentary series Who Do You Think You Are?. She discovered that her grandfather George Baugh disappeared in 1938, having abandoned his family (including Cattrall's then 8-year-old mother and her two younger sisters) and turned out to have bigamously married his new wife the following year in Tudhoe; he subsequently had another four children. Cattrall was told that Baugh emigrated to Australia in 1961, became a postmaster, retired in 1972, and died in Sydney in 1974. Her mother and aunts had known nothing of their father's life after he left until they heard what the Who Do You Think You Are? researchers had discovered, nor had the family previously seen a clear photograph of him. An edited version of the episode was later shown as a part of the American series of the same name.

On 4 February 2018, Cattrall announced that her brother had disappeared in Alberta. She asked for public help in finding him, and he was found dead several hours later, having taken his own life.

Cattrall has been married four times. Her first marriage, from 1977 to 1979, was to Larry Davis, and was annulled. Her second marriage, from 1982 to 1989, was to Andre J. Lyson; the couple lived in Frankfurt, where she learned to speak German fluently, but she admits she has forgotten much of it. Her third marriage, from 1998 to 2004, was to American audio equipment designer Mark Levinson; the couple co-wrote the book Satisfaction: The Art of the Female Orgasm (2002).

Cattrall briefly dated former Canadian Prime Minister Pierre Trudeau (and in 2016 was misidentified on 60 Minutes, from a 1981 photo, as Margaret, the mother of his sons Justin, Alexander, and Michel). She has also been connected to Brazilian-American actor Daniel Benzali, American musician Gerald Casale, French public intellectual Bernard-Henri Lévy, and British-Sudanese actor Alexander Siddig. Since 2016, she has been in a relationship with British BBC employee Russell Thomas. Cattrall and Thomas married at the Chelsea Old Town Hall, London on 4 December 2025.

=== Recognition and philanthropy ===
Cattrall has been awarded an honorary fellowship from Liverpool John Moores University in 2010, for "outstanding and sustained contributions to the dramatic arts", and an honorary Doctor of Laws (LL.D. h.c.) from the University of British Columbia in 2018, for "her contributions as an activist, advocate and humanitarian".

Cattrall funds an annual bursary at her high school alma mater, Georges P. Vanier Secondary School in Courtenay, British Columbia. The Kim Cattrall Bursary for the Performing Arts awards $3,000 to "applicants seeking post-secondary education and/or vocational training in the performing arts." In 2018, Cattrall joined Dame Judi Dench as an ambassador for the Royal Botanic Gardens, Kew, in London.

== Filmography ==
=== Film ===
Year	Title	Role
1975	Rosebud	Joyce Donnovan
1977	Deadly Harvest	Susan Franklin
1980	Tribute	Sally Haines
1981	Ticket to Heaven	Ruthie
1981	Porky's	Miss Lynn "Lassie" Honeywell
1984	Police Academy	Cadet Karen Thompson
1985	Turk 182	Danielle “Danny” Boudreau
1985	City Limits	Wickings
1985	Hold-Up	Lise
1986	Big Trouble in Little China	Gracie Law
1987	Mannequin	Ema "Emmy" Hesire
1988	Masquerade	Brooke Morrison
1988	Midnight Crossing	Alexa Schubb
1988	Palais Royale	Odessa Muldoon
1989	The Return of the Musketeers	Justine de Winter
1989	La famiglia Buonanotte	Aunt Eva
1989	Honeymoon Academy	Chris
1990	The Bonfire of the Vanities	Judy McCoy
1991	Star Trek VI: The Undiscovered Country	Lieutenant Valeris
1992	Split Second	Michelle McLaine
1994	Breaking Point	Allison Meadows
1995	Above Suspicion	Gail Cain
1995	Live Nude Girls	Jamie
1996	Unforgettable	Kelly
1996	Where Truth Lies	Racquel Chambers
1997	Exception to the Rule	Carla Rainer
1998	Modern Vampires	Ulrike
1999	Baby Geniuses	Robin
2001	15 Minutes	Cassandra
2002	Crossroads	Caroline Wagner
2005	Ice Princess	Tina Harwood
2006	The Tiger's Tail	Jane O'Leary
2007	Shortcut to Happiness	Constance Hurry
2008	Sex and the City	Samantha Jones
2010	The Ghost Writer	Amelia Bly
2010	Meet Monica Velour	Monica Velour
2010	Sex and the City 2	Samantha Jones
2019	Horrible Histories: The Movie – Rotten Romans	Agrippina
2023	About My Father	Tigger

=== Television ===
Year	Title	Role	Notes
1976	Dead on Target	Secretary	Uncredited; television film
1977	Good Against Evil	Linda Isley	Television film
1977	Quincy, M.E.	Joy DeReatis	Episode: "Let Me Light the Way"
1977	Logan's Run	Rama II	Episode: "Half Life"
1977	Switch	Captain Judith Pierce	Episode: "Dancer"
1977	What Really Happened to the Class of '65?	Cynthia	Episode: "The Girl Nobody Knew"
1978	The Hardy Boys/Nancy Drew Mysteries	Marie Claire	2 episodes: "Voodoo Doll: Part 1" " Voodoo Doll: Part 2"
1978	Columbo	Joanne Nicholls	Episode: "How to Dial a Murder"
1978	The Bastard	Anne Ware	Miniseries
1978	Starsky & Hutch	Emily Harrison	Episode: "Blindfold"
1978	The Paper Chase	Karen Clayton	Episode: "Da Da"
1978	Family	Susan Madison	Episode: "Just Friends"
1979	The Incredible Hulk	Gabrielle White	Episode: "Kindred Spirits"
1979	How the West Was Won	Dolores	Episode: "The Slavers"
1979	Vegas	Princess Zara	Episode: "The Visitor"
1979	The Night Rider	Regina Kenton	Television film
1979	The Rebels	Anne Kent	Miniseries
1979	Crossbar	Katie Barlow	Television film
1979	Charlie's Angels	Sharon Kellerman	Episode: "Angels at the Altar"
1979	Trapper John, M.D.	Princess Allya	Episode: "The Surrogate"
1980	Scruples	Melanie Adams	Miniseries; 3 episodes
1980	The Gossip Columnist	Dina Moran	Television film
1980	Hagen	Carol Sawyer	Episode: "Nightmare"
1982	Tucker's Witch	Amanda Tucker	Unaired version of pilot episode.
1982	Trapper John, M.D.	Amy West	Episode: "You Pays Your Money"
1983	Tales of the Gold Monkey	Whitney Bunting	Episode: "Naka Jima Kill"
1984	Sins of the Past	Paula Bennett	Television film
1991	Miracle in the Wilderness	Dora Adams	Television film
1992	Double Vision	Caroline/Lisa	Television film
1993	Running Delilah	Christina/Delilah	Television film
1993	Wild Palms	Paige Katz	Miniseries; 5 episodes
1993	Angel Falls	Genna Harrison	Main role; 6 episodes
1994	Dream On	Jeannie	Episode: "The Homecoming Queen"
1994	Screen One	Sydnie	Episode: "Two Golden Balls"
1995	Tom Clancy's Op Center	Jane Hood	Miniseries; 2 episodes
1995	The Heidi Chronicles	Susan	Television film
1996	Every Woman's Dream	Liz Wells	Television film
1997	The Outer Limits	Rebecca Highfield	Episode: "Re-generation"
1997	Invasion	Sheila Moran	Miniseries; 2 episodes
1997	Rugrats	Melinda Finster (voice)	Episode: "Mother's Day"
1997	Duckman	Tami Margulies (voice)	Episode: "The Tami Show"
1998	Creature	Amanda Mayson	Miniseries; 2 episodes
1998–2004	Sex and the City	Samantha Jones	Main role; 94 episodes
1999	36 Hours to Die	Kim Stone	Television film
2004	The Simpsons	Chloe Talbot (voice)	Episode: "She Used to Be My Girl"
2005	Kim Cattrall: Sexual Intelligence	Herself	Television documentary film; also executive producer
2007	My Boy Jack	Caroline Kipling	Television film
2007	The Sunday Night Project	Herself	Guest host; series 5, episode 13
2009	Who Do You Think You Are? (UK)	Herself	Episode: "Kim Cattrall"
2009	The Simpsons	Fourth Simpsons child (voice)	Episode: "O Brother, Where Bart Thou?"
2009–2011	Producing Parker	Dee (voice)	26 episodes
2010	Any Human Heart	Gloria Scabius	Miniseries; 2 episodes
2011	Who Do You Think You Are? (US)	Herself	Episode: "Kim Cattrall"
2011	Upstairs Downstairs Abbey	Countess of Grantham	Red Nose Day 2011 telethon sketch
2014–2016	Sensitive Skin	Davina Jackson	Main role; 12 episodes
2016	The Witness for the Prosecution	Emily French	Serial; 2 episodes
2017	Modus	US President Helen Tyler	Season 2
2018–2019	Tell Me a Story	Colleen Powell	Main role (season 1)
2020	Filthy Rich	Margaret Monreaux	Main role, 10 episodes; executive producer
2022	New York: World's Richest City	Narrator (voice)	Documentary series
2022	Queer as Folk	Brenda Beaumont	Recurring role
2022–2023	How I Met Your Father	Future Sophie	Narrator
2023	Glamorous	Madolyn Addison	Main role
2023	And Just Like That...	Samantha Jones	Episode: "The Last Supper Part Two: Entree"

=== Music videos ===
Year	Song	Artist	Role
1987	"Nothing's Gonna Stop Us Now"	Starship	Ema "Emmy" Hesire

=== Podcast series ===
Year	Title	Role	Notes
2024–present	Central Intelligence	Eloise Page	At present, 30 episodes of BBC Radio 4 series.

== Theatre ==
Year	Title	Role	Venue(s)
1976	The Rocky Horror Show	Janet	Ryerson Theatre
1982	A View from the Bridge	Performer	Lee Strasberg Institute
1985	Three Sisters	Masha	Los Angeles Theatre Center
1986	Wild Honey	Sofya	Ahmanson Theatre
1986	Wild Honey	Sofya	Virginia Theatre (Broadway debut)
1989	The Misanthrope	Célimène	La Jolla Playhouse
1989	The Misanthrope	Célimène	Goodman Theatre
1993	Miss Julie	Miss Julie	McCarter Theatre
2005	Whose Life Is It Anyway?	Claire Harrison	Harold Pinter Theatre
2006	The Cryptogram	Donny	Donmar Warehouse
2010	Private Lives	Amanda	Theatre Royal, Bath
2010	Private Lives	Amanda	Vaudeville Theatre
2010	Antony and Cleopatra	Cleopatra	Liverpool Playhouse
2011	Private Lives	Amanda	Royal Alexandra Theatre
2011	Private Lives	Amanda	Music Box Theatre
2012	Antony and Cleopatra	Cleopatra	Chichester Festival Theatre
2013	Sweet Bird of Youth	Alexandra Del Lago	The Old Vic

== Awards and nominations ==
Year	Award	Category	Work	Result
1982	Genie Award	Best Performance by an Actress in a Leading Role	Ticket to Heaven	Nominated
1991	Golden Raspberry Award	Worst Supporting Actress	The Bonfire of the Vanities	Nominated
1999	Women in Film Crystal + Lucy Award	Lucy Award (shared with Sarah Jessica Parker, Kristin Davis and Cynthia Nixon)	Sex and the City	Won
2000	Golden Globe Award	Best Supporting Actress – Series, Miniseries or Television Film	Sex and the City	Nominated
2000	Primetime Emmy Award	Outstanding Supporting Actress in a Comedy Series	Sex and the City	Nominated
2001	Golden Globe Award	Best Supporting Actress – Series, Miniseries or Television Film	Sex and the City	Nominated
2001	Screen Actors Guild Award	Outstanding Performance by an Ensemble in a Comedy Series (shared with Sarah Jessica Parker, Kristin Davis and Cynthia Nixon)	Sex and the City	Nominated
2001	Primetime Emmy Award	Outstanding Supporting Actress in a Comedy Series	Sex and the City	Nominated
2002	Screen Actors Guild Award	Outstanding Performance by a Female Actor in a Comedy Series	Sex and the City	Nominated
2002	Screen Actors Guild Award	Outstanding Performance by an Ensemble in a Comedy Series (shared with Sarah Jessica Parker, Kristin Davis and Cynthia Nixon)	Sex and the City	Won
2002	Primetime Emmy Award	Outstanding Supporting Actress in a Comedy Series	Sex and the City	Nominated
2003	Golden Globe Award	Best Supporting Actress – Series, Miniseries or Television Film	Sex and the City	Won
2003	Screen Actors Guild Award	Outstanding Performance by a Female Actor in a Comedy Series	Sex and the City	Nominated
2003	Screen Actors Guild Award	Outstanding Performance by an Ensemble in a Comedy Series (shared with Sarah Jessica Parker, Kristin Davis and Cynthia Nixon)	Sex and the City	Nominated
2003	Primetime Emmy Award	Outstanding Supporting Actress in a Comedy Series	Sex and the City	Nominated
2004	Golden Satellite Award	Best Supporting Actress – Television Series	Sex and the City	Nominated
2004	Golden Globe Award	Best Supporting Actress – Series, Miniseries or Television Film	Sex and the City	Nominated
2004	Screen Actors Guild Award	Outstanding Performance by an Ensemble in a Comedy Series (shared with Sarah Jessica Parker, Kristin Davis and Cynthia Nixon)	Sex and the City	Won
2004	Primetime Emmy Award	Outstanding Supporting Actress in a Comedy Series	Sex and the City	Nominated
2005	Screen Actors Guild Award	Outstanding Performance by an Ensemble in a Comedy Series (shared with Sarah Jessica Parker, Kristin Davis and Cynthia Nixon)	Sex and the City	Nominated
2006	Gemini Award	Best Host or Interviewer in a General/Human Interest or Talk Program or Series	Kim Cattrall: Sexual Intelligence	Nominated
2009	People's Choice Award	Favorite Cast (shared with Sarah Jessica Parker, Kristin Davis, Cynthia Nixon and Chris Noth)	Sex and the City	Nominated
2011	Golden Raspberry Award	Worst Actress (shared with Sarah Jessica Parker, Kristin Davis and Cynthia Nixon)	Sex and the City 2	Won
2011	Golden Raspberry Award	Worst Ensemble (shared with the entire Crew)	Sex and the City 2	Won
2011	GLAAD Media Award	Golden Gate Award		Won
2012	Drama League Award	Distinguished Performer Award	Private Lives	Nominated
2013	Canadian Screen Award	Best Performance in an Animated Program or Series	Producing Parker	Nominated
2015	International Emmy Award	Best Comedy Series	Sensitive Skin	Nominated
2017	Canadian Screen Award	Best Performance by an Actress in a Continuing Leading Comedic Role	Sensitive Skin	Nominated
2024	Golden Raspberry Award	Worst Supporting Actress	About My Father	Nominated
