= Tom Bosley =

American actor (1927–2010)

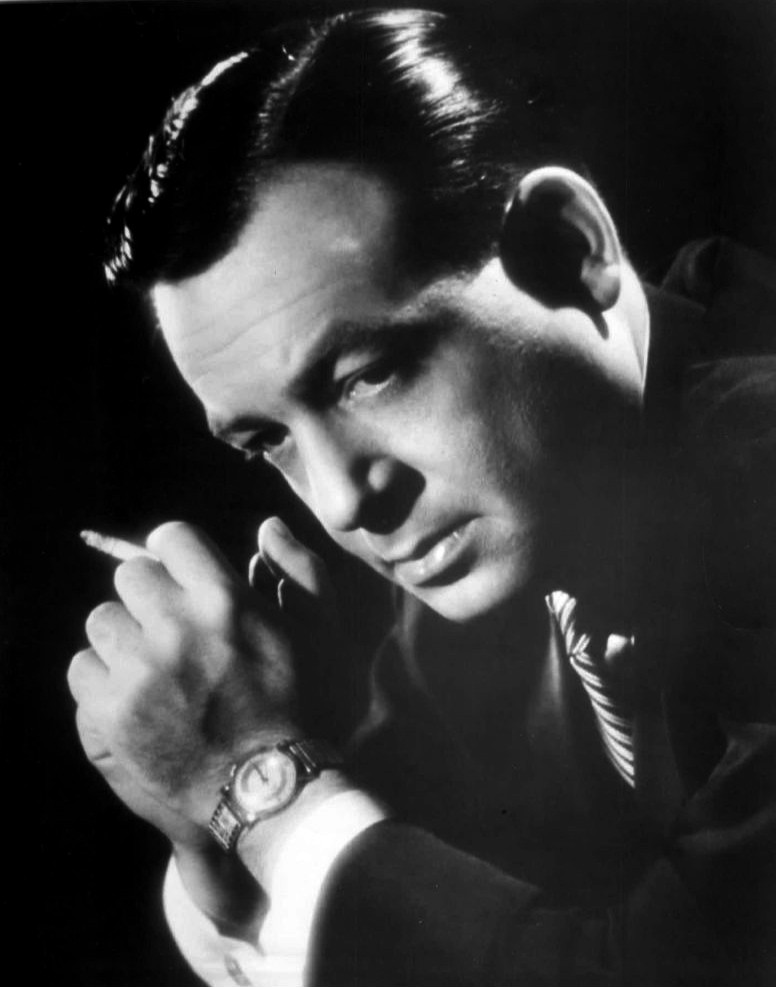
- Bosley in September 1960
- Born: Thomas Edward Bosley; October 1, 1927; Chicago, Illinois, U.S.
- Died: October 19, 2010 (aged 83); Rancho Mirage, California, U.S.
- Burial place: Forest Lawn Memorial Park, Hollywood Hills
- Education: DePaul University
- Occupations: Actor; TV personality; entertainer
- Years active: 1955–2010
- Known for: Fiorello!
- Television: Happy Days; Murder, She Wrote; Father Dowling Mysteries
- Spouses: Jean Eliot (m. 1962; died 1978) Patricia Carr (m. 1980)
- Children: 1
- Awards: Tony Award

Signature
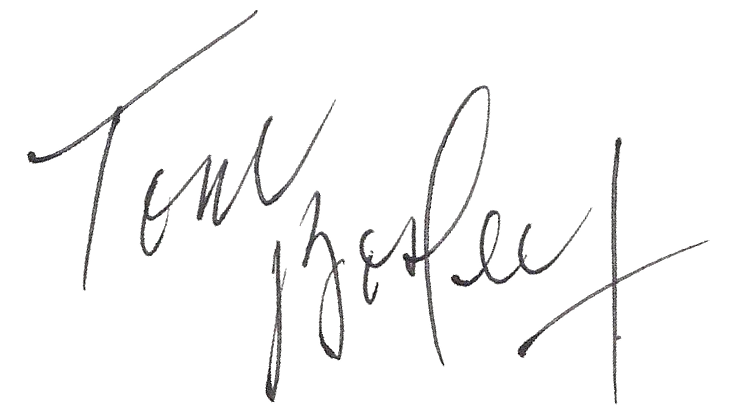

Thomas Edward Bosley (October 1, 1927 – October 19, 2010) was an American actor, television personality and entertainer. Bosley is most notable for portraying Howard Cunningham on the ABC sitcom Happy Days (1974–1984) for which he received a Primetime Emmy Award for Outstanding Supporting Actor in a Comedy Series nomination. Bosley also did a variety of voiceover work such as playing the lead character, Harry Boyle, in the animated series Wait Till Your Father Gets Home, and the narrator of the syndicated film history documentary series That's Hollywood. He was also known for his role as Sheriff Amos Tupper in the Angela Lansbury-led CBS mystery series Murder, She Wrote (1984–1988), and as the title character in the NBC/ABC series Father Dowling Mysteries (1989–1991).

Known for his work on stage, he originated the role of Fiorello La Guardia in the Broadway musical Fiorello!, earning the 1960 Tony Award for Best Performance by a Featured Actor in a Musical. He's also known for his film appearances in Love with the Proper Stranger (1963), The World of Henry Orient (1964), Divorce American Style (1967), Yours, Mine and Ours, The Secret War of Harry Frigg (both 1968), Gus (1976), and The Back-up Plan (2010).

Bosley made his television debut as the Knave of Hearts in the NBC adaptation of Alice in Wonderland in 1955. He gained attention as a character actor performing various roles in shows such as Naked City, Profiles in Courage, The Defenders, Night Gallery, Get Smart, Bewitched, and Mission: Impossible.

== Early life ==
Born and raised in Chicago, Bosley was the son of Dora (née Heyman) and Benjamin Bosley. Although well known for playing a Catholic priest and Protestant patriarchs, Bosley was actually Jewish. He served in the U.S. Navy and then studied at DePaul University.

== Career ==
=== Early roles and stage roles ===
Bosley played the Knave of Hearts in a Hallmark Hall of Fame telecast of Eva Le Gallienne's production of Alice in Wonderland in 1955. But his breakthrough stage role was New York mayor Fiorello H. La Guardia in the long-running Broadway musical Fiorello! (1959), for which he won a Tony Award.

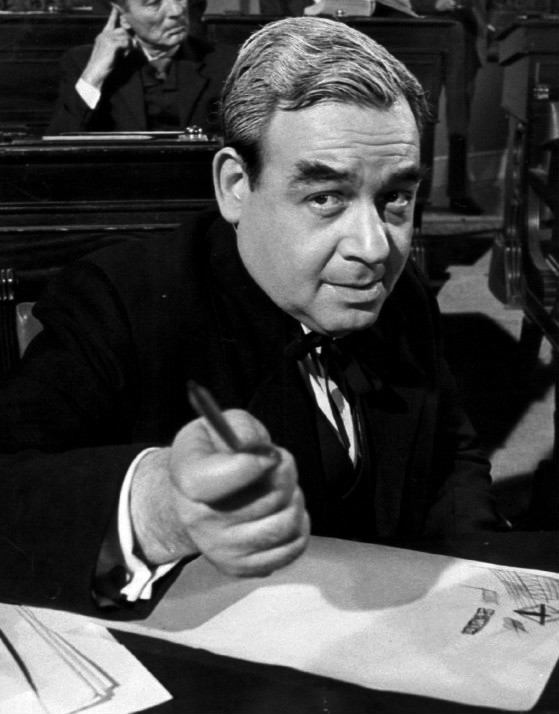
Bosley as George W. Norris in the television anthology Profiles in Courage, 1965

Among his early television appearances was in 1960 on the CBS summer replacement series, Diagnosis: Unknown, with Patrick O'Neal. In 1962, he portrayed Assistant District Attorney Ryan in the episode "The Man Who Wanted to Die" on James Whitmore's ABC legal drama The Law and Mr. Jones. Also in 1962, Bosley played Teddy opposite Tony Randall and Boris Karloff in Arsenic & Old Lace for the Hallmark Hall of Fame. About this time, he was a guest star on the NBC police sitcom, Car 54, Where Are You?. In June 1964, he appeared on the satirical television comedy revue, That Was the Week That Was.

He also appeared on episodes of Bonanza, Bewitched, Mission: Impossible, Naked City, Profiles in Courage, The Defenders, Get Smart, The Silent Force, The Streets of San Francisco, A Touch of Grace, and The Love Boat. Among myriad television appearances, one notable early performance was in the "Eyes" segment of the 1969 pilot of Rod Serling's Night Gallery, directed by Steven Spielberg and starring Joan Crawford. That same year, Bosley appeared in a comical episode of The Virginian, titled "Crime Wave in Buffalo Springs," appearing alongside fellow guest-stars James Brolin, Yvonne De Carlo, Carrie Snodgress, Gary Vinson, with Virginian regulars David Hartman and Doug McClure.

Bosley's first motion picture role was in 1963, as the would-be suitor of Natalie Wood in Love with the Proper Stranger. Other films included The World of Henry Orient (1964), Divorce American Style (1967), Bang Bang Kid (1967), The Secret War of Harry Frigg (1968), Yours, Mine and Ours (1968), and To Find a Man (1972).

=== Happy Days and other film and television roles ===
Bosley's best-known role was the character Howard Cunningham in the ABC sitcom Happy Days, which aired from 1974 to 1984. For his role, he received a Primetime Emmy Award for Outstanding Supporting Actor in a Comedy Series nomination in 1978. Following Happy Days, he portrayed Sheriff Amos Tupper in a recurring role in the CBS series Murder, She Wrote (1984–1988), and then starred as the eponymous Father Frank Dowling in the NBC/ABC series Father Dowling Mysteries (1989–1991).

In 1977, he appeared in the miniseries Testimony of Two Men and, in 1978, he played the role of Benjamin Franklin in the television mini-series The Bastard, a role he replayed the following year in the sequel The Rebels. His subsequent film appearances included roles in Mixed Company (1974), The Night That Panicked America (1975), Gus (1976), the made-for-television The Triangle Factory Fire Scandal (1979), O'Hara's Wife (1982), Million Dollar Mystery (1987), and Wicked Stepmother (1989).

In 1994, Bosley originated the role of Maurice in the Broadway version of Disney's Beauty and the Beast. He also toured as Cap'n Andy in Harold Prince's 1994 revival of Show Boat. Bosley shared a heartfelt story about his own experience with the Holocaust in the 2004 documentary film Paper Clips.

Bosley starred in the 2008 Hallmark Channel television movie Charlie & Me. In 2010, he appeared in The Back-up Plan and Santa Buddies, which were his final films. In 1984, he guest-hosted the Macy's Fourth of July Fireworks Spectacular with local newscaster Pat Harper.

=== Voice-over roles ===
Bosley was known for his unique gravelly voice, leading to a number of voice acting roles. He narrated the syndicated television documentary That's Hollywood (1976–82). He hosted The General Mills Radio Adventure Theater, a 1977 radio drama series for children. He voiced many cartoon characters, including Harry Boyle in the animated series Wait Till Your Father Gets Home (1972-1974). Bosley was the voice of B.A.H. Humbug in the 1978 Rankin & Bass holiday special The Stingiest Man in Town. He provided the voice of the title character in the 1980s cartoon The World of David the Gnome and the shop owner Mr. Winkle in the children's Christmas special The Tangerine Bear.

=== Endorsements ===
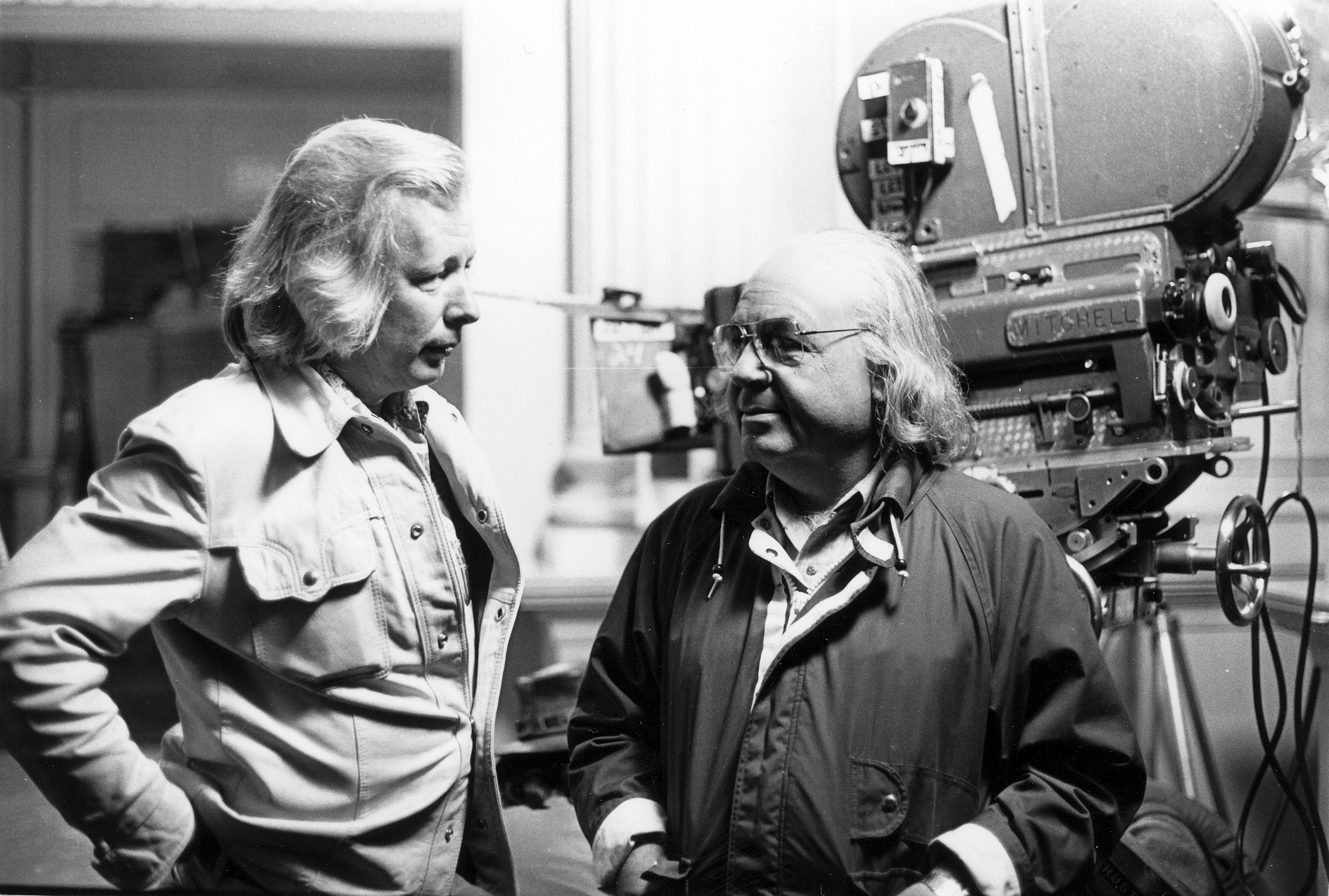
Tom Bosley as Benjamin Franklin in 1979

From the 1950s through the 1990s, Bosley appeared in numerous television commercials including Studebaker automobiles (1956), and Glad sandwich and garbage bags. He appeared in radio commercials for the new Saturn car company, a "different kind of car company," in 1990. Later in life, he was the television spokesman for SMC (Specialty Merchandise Corporation), a national wholesaler and drop shipper.

Bosley was a spokesman for YES Entertainment Network, Inc., a fraudulent internet firm scheme that defrauded $13 million from investors around the country in the late 1990s.

== Personal life and death ==
Tom Bosley's first wife, Jean Eliot, died in 1978. They had one daughter, Amy. Bosley married Patricia Carr in 1980. Amy married Matthew Baer, son of Richard Baer. Amy is a successful producer, graduating from Georgetown University Law School. She works at Artists' Equity film studio. Bosley died from complications of a staphylococcal infection on October 19, 2010, at a hospital in Rancho Mirage, California, near his home in Palm Springs, California. His agent, Sheryl Abrams, said Bosley, a longtime smoker, had lung cancer. He is survived by his wife Patricia and daughter Amy.

== Happy Days lawsuit ==
On April 19, 2011, Bosley's estate and four of his Happy Days co-stars, Erin Moran, Don Most, Marion Ross, and Anson Williams, filed a $10 million breach-of-contract lawsuit against CBS, which owns the show, claiming they had not been paid for merchandising revenues owed under their contracts. The cast members claimed they had not received revenues from show-related items, including comic books, T-shirts, scrapbooks, trading cards, games, lunchboxes, dolls, toy cars, magnets, greeting cards, and DVDs where their images appear on the box covers. Under their contracts, they were supposed to be paid five percent from the net proceeds of merchandising if their sole image were used, and half that amount if they were in a group. CBS said it owed the actors $8,500 and $9,000 each, most of it from slot machine revenues, but the group said they were owed millions. The lawsuit was initiated after Ross was informed by a friend playing slots at a casino of a "Happy Days" machine on which players win the jackpot when five Marion Cunninghams (Ross's character on Happy Days) are rolled.

In October 2011, a judge rejected the group's fraud claim, which if proved could have garnered them millions of dollars in punitive damages, above and beyond any actual damages proven. On June 5, 2012, a judge denied a motion filed by CBS to have the case thrown out, which meant it would go to trial on July 17 if the matter was not settled by then. In July 2012, the actors settled their lawsuit with CBS. Each received a payment of $65,000 and a promise by CBS to continue honoring the terms of their contracts.

== Filmography and stage roles ==
=== Film ===
Year	Title	Role	Notes
1963	Love with the Proper Stranger	Anthony Colombo	
1964	The World of Henry Orient	Frank Boyd	
1967	Divorce American Style	Farley	
1967	Bang Bang Kid	Meriweather P. Newberry	
1968	The Secret War of Harry Frigg	Brigadier General Roscoe Pennypacker	
1968	Yours, Mine and Ours	Family Doctor	
1972	To Find a Man	Dr. Katchaturian	
1974	Mixed Company	Al	
1976	Gus	Spinner	
1982	O'Hara's Wife	Frank O'Hara	
1987	Million Dollar Mystery	Sidney Preston	
1987	Pinocchio and the Emperor of the Night	Mister Geppetto	Voice
1987	The Gnomes' Great Adventure	David The Gnome	Voice
1989	Wicked Stepmother	Lieutenant MacIntosh	
1998	Little Bigfoot 2: The Journey Home	Ranger Tasker	
2000	The Tangerine Bear	Mr. Winkle	Voice, Direct-to-video
2002	Returning Mickey Stern	Harry Mankelbaum	
2004	Felix the Cat Saves Christmas	Santa Claus	Voice, Direct-to-video
2005	Confession	Father Abbott Sutton	
2005	Popstar	Harvey	
2005	Geppetto's Secret	Geppetto	Voice
2006	Mothers and Daughters	Bob	
2009	Santa Buddies	Santa Paws	Voice, Direct-to-video
2010	The Back-up Plan	Arthur	Final appearance

=== Television ===
Year	Title	Role	Notes
1955	Alice in Wonderland	Knave of Hearts	Television film
1955	TV Reader's Digest	Man In Studebaker Commercial	Episode: "If I Were Rich"; Uncredited
1959	The Play of the Week	Dupont-Dufour Jr.	Episode: "Thieves Carnival"
1960	Diagnosis: Unknown	Freddie Ziegler	Episode: "The Case of the Radiant Wine"
1960	The Right Man	Throttlebottom	Television film
1962	Focus	Fred Copper	Television film
1962	Arsenic & Old Lace	Teddy Brewster	Television film
1962	The Law and Mr. Jones	Assistant District Attorney Ryan	Episode: "The Man who Wanted to Die"
1963	Car 54, Where Are You?	Reverend Harold Petersen / Archie, The Artist	Episode: "The Star Boarder"
1963	Naked City	Judge	Episode: "Golden Lads and Girls"
1963	Route 66	Jim Horst; Summer Klein	"Soda Pop and Paper Flags" "Same Picture, Different Frame"
1963–1964	The Nurses	Clarence; Mr. Ross	"The Witch of the East Wing" "Rites of Spring"
1964	A Very Close Family	Son	Television film
1964	The DuPont Show of the Week	Howard	Episode: "The Gambling Heart"
1965	Dr. Kildare	Harry Markham	Episode: "All Brides Should Be Beautiful"
1965	Profiles in Courage	George William Norris	Episode: "George W. Norris"
1965	Ben Casey	Timothy Michael MacMurrough	Episode: "Did Your Mother Come from Ireland, Ben Casey?"
1965	The Defenders	Charlie Barry	Episode: "The Bum's Rush"
1966	Jericho	Percy Vandercook	Episode: "Dutch and Go"
1966	The Girl from U.N.C.L.E.	Quantum	Episode: "The Faustus Affair"
1968	The F.B.I.	John Clanton	Episode: "Ring of Steel"
1968	Get Smart	Emil Farkas	Episode: "The Farkas Fracas"
1968–1969	Bonanza	Titus Simpson; Hiram Peabody	"The Last Vote" "A Lawman's Lot is Not a Happy One"
1969	The Virginian	Nat Trumbull	Episode: "Crime Wave in Buffalo Springs"
1969	The Mod Squad	John Wells	Episode: "A Run for the Money"
1969	Marcus Welby, M.D.	"Tiny" Baker	Episode: "A Matter of Humanities"
1969–1970	The Debbie Reynolds Show	Bob Landers	Series regular 18 episodes
1969–1971	Night Gallery	Sidney Resnick; Jules Kettleman	"The Cemetery/Eyes/The Escape Route" "Make Me Laugh/Clean Kills and Other Trophies"
1970	The Bill Cosby Show	"Cookie" Moharg	Episode: "The Gumball Incident"
1970	The Most Deadly Game	George	Episode: "Breakdown"
1970	The Silent Force	Binachi	Episode: "In By Nine, Out By Five"
1970–1973	Love, American Style	Dr. Y.A. Harris; Jack Smallerd; Harry Boyle; Alan Walker	"Love and the Uncoupled Couple" "Love and the Artful Codger" "Love and the Old-Fashioned Father" "Love and the Comedienne"
1970–1971	The Name of the Game	Charley Reid; Morey Tate	"A Love to Remember" "Seek and Destroy"
1971	A Step Out of Line	Jack Berger	Television film
1971	Vanished	Johnny Cavanaugh	Television film
1971	Bewitched	Ferdy	Episode: "Samantha's Magic Mirror"
1971	Mission: Impossible	Henry Matula	Episode: "Blind"
1971	Funny Face	Used Car Dealer	Episode: "The Used Car"
1971	Congratulations, It's a Boy!	Herb	Television film
1971	Sarge	Stanley Miller	Episode: "Psst! Wanna Buy a Dirty Picture?"
1971	The New Dick Van Dyke Show	Mr. O'Hare	Episode: "A Home is Not a Home, Yet"
1971	Mr. and Mrs. Bo Jo Jones	Mr. Jones	Television film
1972	Me and the Chimp	Goodrich	Episode: "The Paint Job"
1972	Bobby Jo and the Good Time Band	Mayor	Television movie
1972	No Place to Run	Dr. Golinski	Television movie
1972	Banyon	Steve Corbett	Episode: "The Graveyard Vote"
1972	The Sixth Sense	Albert	Episode: "The Eyes that Wouldn't Die"
1972	The Sandy Duncan Show	Bert Quinn	Main cast 11 episodes
1972–1974	Wait Till Your Father Gets Home	Harry Boyle (voice)	Lead role 48 episodes
1973	Temperatures Rising	Gibson	Episode: "Black is Beautiful"
1973	Medical Center	Howard Spirling	Episode: "Judgement"
1973	The Paul Lynde Show	Congressman Landis	Episode: "The Congressman's Son"
1973	Maude	Dr. Tasko	Episode: "Maude and the Medical Profession"
1973	A Touch of Grace	Preacher	Episode: "The Lodge"
1973	Chase	Axel Sullivan	Episode: "Gang War"
1973	Tenafly	Dave Barker	Episode: "Joyride to Nowhere"
1973	McMillan & Wife	Sam Hamilton	Episode: "Freefall to Terror"
1973	Miracle on 34th Street	Judge Henry X. Harper	Television film
1973–1976	The Streets of San Francisco	Saretti; Eddie Coughlin; Eddie Clark	"Pilot" "Going Home" "Dead or Alive"
1974	The Girl Who Came Gift-Wrapped	Harold	Television film
1974	Death Cruise	David Mason	Television film
1974–1984	Happy Days	Howard Cunningham	Main cast 255 episodes Nominated—Primetime Emmy Award for Outstanding Continuing Performance by a Supporting Actor in a Comedy Series (1978)
1975	Who Is the Black Dahlia?	Bevo Means, Reporter	Television film
1975	Insight	Incredible Man	Episode: "The Incredible Man"
1975	The Last Survivors	Marcus Damian	Television film
1975	Kolchak: The Night Stalker	Jack Flaherty	Episode: "The Sentry"
1975	Ellery Queen	Bud Armstrong	Episode: "The Adventure of the Comic Book Crusader"
1975	The Night That Panicked America	Norman Smith	Television film
1975	Mobile One	John Brewster	Episode: "The Crusader"
1976	The Love Boat	George Havlicek	Pilot film
1977	Testimony of Two Men	Dr. Lewis Hedler	Miniseries
1977	Black Market Baby	Dr. Andrew Brantford	Television film
1978	With This Ring	Edward Edwards	Television movie
1978	The Bastard	Benjamin Franklin	Miniseries
1978	The Hanna-Barbera Happy Hour	Himself	Comedy-Variety Show
1978	The Stingiest Man in Town	B. A. H. Humbug, Esq. (voices)	Television special
1979	The Triangle Factory Fire Scandal	Morris Feldman	Television film
1979	The Castaways on Gilligan's Island	Henry Elliott	Television film
1979	The Rebels	Benjamin Franklin	Miniseries
1979	The Return of Mod Squad	Frank Webber	Television film
1980	Here's Boomer	Archie Hale	Episode: "Me and My Shadow"
1980	For the Love of It	Norman	Television film
1982	Tales of the Unexpected	Robert Stackpole	Episode: "Light Fingers"
1982	Joanie Loves Chachi	Howard Cunningham	Two episodes
1982–1987	The Love Boat	Harry Meacham; Herbert Chandler; George Hammond; Howard Pfister	"Pride of the Pacific/The Viking's Son/Separate Vacations/The Experiment/Getting to Know You" "Julie and the Bachelor/Set-Up for Romance/Intensive Care" "Hidden Treasure/Picture from the Past/Ace's Salary" "Who Killed Maxwell Thorn?"
1984	The Jesse Owens Story	Jimmy Hoffa	Television film
1984–1988	Murder, She Wrote	Sheriff Amos Tupper	Recurring role 19 episodes
1985	Finder of Lost Loves	Malcolm Beck	Episode: "Deadly Silence"
1985	Private Sessions	Harry O'Reilly	Television film
1985	Glitter	Doc	Episode: "Rock 'n' Roll Heaven"
1986	Perry Mason: The Case of the Notorious Nun	Father Chris DeLeon	Television film
1986–1987	Hotel	Walter Devlin; Blaine Chapman	"Child's Play" "Fatal Attraction"
1987	Fatal Confession: A Father Dowling Mystery	Father Frank Dowling	Television film
1987	The World of David the Gnome	David The Gnome (voice)	(English version)
1988–1989	Out of This World	Grandpa Zelig	Two episodes
1989	Fire and Rain	Derryl Price	Television film
1989–1991	Father Dowling Mysteries	Father Frank Dowling	Lead role 42 episodes
1990	The Love Boat: A Valentine Voyage	Lieutenant Logan	Television film
1992	Hearts Are Wild	Sam Fesman	Episode: "The Catch"
1993	ABC Weekend Special	Carl W. Clemmer	Episode: "The Parsley Garden"
1993–2002	Rugrats	Strike Maxwell; Dwayne Tickerbacker	"King Ten Pen/Runaway Angelica" "Murmur on the Ornery Express"
1994	Burke's Law	Dr. Blake	Episode: "Who Killed Alexander the Great?"
1994	Heaven Help Us	Albert	Episode: "Lovers Lullaby"
1996	The Drew Carey Show	Mr. Bobeck	Episode: "Mimi's Day Parade"
1996	Boy Meets World	Himself	Episode: "I Was a Teenage Spy"
1997	Johnny Bravo	Santa Claus (voice)	Episode: "'Twas the Night"
1999	Early Edition	Uncle Vic	Episode: "Just One of Those Things"
1999	Port Charles	Burt	One episode
1999	Maggie	Father George	Episode: "Uh-oh Baby"
2000	Jack & Jill	Bernie	Episode: "Lovers and Other Strangers"
2000	Walker, Texas Ranger	Minister	Two episodes
2001	Jason and the Heroes of Mount Olympus	Jupiter (voice)	Main cast 26 episodes
2001	ER	Walter Nikolaides	Two episodes
2001	Legend of the Candy Cane	Franklin Holz (voice)	Television film
2001	Family Law	Kyle Mason	Episode: "Angel's Flight"
2002	Touched by an Angel	Elmer	Episode: "The Blue Angel"
2002	Mary Christmas	Les Turner	Television film
2004	It's All Relative	Father Joseph	Episode: "Fight for Your Invite to Party"
2004	Christmas at Water's Edge	Harry	Television film
2005	Still Standing	Dr. S.T. Bloom	Episode: "Still Holding"
2005	The Fallen Ones	Rabbi Eli Schmitt	Television film
2005	One Tree Hill	Mel McFadden	Episode: "Champagne for My Real Friends, Real Pain for My Sham Friends"
2005	Family Guy	Howard Cunningham (voice)	Episode: "The Father, the Son, and the Holy Fonz"
2006	Nobody's Watching	Tom Bosley	Television pilot
2006	Hidden Places	Wakefield	Television film
2006	That '70s Show	Dr. Hammond	Episode: "Crazy Little Thing Called Love"
2008	Charlie & Me	Charlie	Television film
2010	Betsy's Kindergarten Adventures	Principal Richard Warner (voice)	Episode: "The People in Our Community: Introducing the Police Department"

=== Stage ===
Year	Title	Role	Notes
1958	The Power and the Glory	Villager, Prisoner, Indian	Broadway
1959	The Beaux' Stratagem	Scrub	Broadway
1959	Fiorello!	Fiorello LaGuardia	Broadway; Tony Award for Best Supporting or Featured Actor in a Musical
1962	Nowhere to Go But Up	Izzy Einstein	Broadway
1963	Natural Affection	Vince Brinkman	Broadway
1964	A Murderer Among Us	Cabouche	Broadway
1965	Catch Me If You Can	Performer	Broadway
1968	The Education of H*Y*M*A*N K*A*P*L*A*N	Hyman Kaplan	Broadway
1994	Beauty and the Beast	Maurice	Broadway
1996	Show Boat	Cap'n Andy	national tour
2002	Cabaret	Herr Schultz	Broadway
2006	On Golden Pond	Norman Thayer Jr.	national tour

== Awards and nominations ==
Year	Award	Category	Nominated work	Result	Ref.
1987	Golden Raspberry Awards	Worst Supporting Actor	Million Dollar Mystery	Nominated	
1964	Laurel Awards	Top Male New Face	—N/a	11th Place	
1978	Primetime Emmy Awards	Outstanding Continuing Performance by a Supporting Actor in a Comedy Series	Happy Days	Nominated	
1960	Tony Awards	Best Supporting or Featured Actor in a Musical	Fiorello!	Won	
