= Operation Prime Time =

Television programming provider

- Type: occasional television network
- Country: United States
- Founded: 1976; 50 years ago by Al Masini
- Key people: Al Masini
- Launch date: 1976; 50 years ago
- Dissolved: 1987; 39 years ago

Operation Prime Time (OPT) was a consortium of American independent television stations to develop prime time programming for independent stations. OPT and its spin-off syndication company, Television Program Enterprises (TPE), were formed by Al Masini. During its existence, OPT was considered the de facto fourth television network. OPT was also called an occasional television network and occasional program alternative.

OPT inspired syndication and network models that arose in later years, such as The Disney Afternoon, Prime Time Entertainment Network, The CW Plus, and MyNetworkTV.

== Operations ==
Unlike the standard network advertising split, where the stations got the bulk of the ad time with the collective network only receiving one or two minutes of the dozen minutes available to sell, the OPT ad time would be sold at 1/3 of network rates or about $40,000 per half minute with the profits going back to the stations.

== Background ==
With the development of the Prime Time Access Rule and the Financial Interest and Syndication Rules in the 1970's, network level quality programming was now available for independent stations to advertisers through syndication. Producers of TV programs were also looking for an alternative to the standard network set up that paid the producers about three fourths of the production costs thus the show would only make money for the production company if it made enough episodes to place into rerun syndication. Advertisers were looking for new advertising outlets due to rising network ad costs with a 30% increase in 1977. Networks' income increased 143% from 1969 to 1974 while network payments to affiliates decreased by 2%.

== History ==
Al Masini, who represented 18 stations for advertising sales through his company TeleRep, discussed the independent stations' problem with other independent stations after a broadcast media meeting in February 1976. Determined to offer an alternative, Masini rounded up a steering committee to form the new venture. Initial members of the committee included Shelly Cooper, General Manager of WGN-TV Chicago, Rich Frank of KCOP-TV Los Angeles, and representatives of KTVU, WPIX and KSTW. At the next broadcaster convention, the committee met to develop the details. The OPT committee then contacted Frank Price of Universal Television for the first program. Price offered Taylor Caldwell's novel Testimony of Two Men as a miniseries with Universal taking on a fifth of the production cost. The committee was initially able to get 22 independent and 53 network-affiliated stations to sign on to OPT.

Advertisers like General Foods and Bristol-Myers abandoned the rival potential fourth network, Metromedia's MetroNet, for OPT, based on Metromedia's near Big 3 network cost per thousand viewers advertising cost and OPT reaching 80% of the country. Masini eventually lined up 93 stations, 73 of which were affiliates of ABC, NBC or CBS; of those affiliated with a network, these affiliates had to preempt part of their regular network prime time programming to make room for specials from OPT. KCOP's broadcast of Testimony of Two Men's first installment got a 16 rating and the second installment got an 18, well over their standard 4 rating, but in May, a traditional rerun period for the networks.

Prime Time planned three book adaptions for their shows to air in May, July and November or December 1978 with two of them being John Jakes's The Bastard and The Rebels leading the way for the rest of the book series that OPT optioned including two then currently being written. Martin Gosch's and Richard Hammer's The Last Testimony of Lucky Luciano was the third adaptation scheduled for 1978.

The most successful miniseries from OPT was "A Woman Called Golda" It won multiple Emmy awards and was nominated for two Golden Globes.

The last time the Operation Prime Time name was used was at the end of 1986, when the Fox Broadcasting Company was barely on the air. At that point, it was just The Late Show Starring Joan Rivers; they didn't launch prime time programming until the spring of 1987. Ultimately, the arrival of Fox as well as original programming for cable networks and stations would eventually make the OPT business model obsolete.

== List of programs produced by OPT ==
The company's first production was the 1977 miniseries Testimony of Two Men, an adaptation of the 1968 Civil War novel by Taylor Caldwell, whose Captains and the Kings had been turned into a successful miniseries for NBC the previous year. OPT also distributed the animated Christmas special Yogi's First Christmas.

The most successful program from both OPT and TPE was, and still is, Entertainment Tonight, now produced and distributed by CBS Media Ventures. Other programs included Solid Gold, Star Search, and Lifestyles of the Rich and Famous. It could be common place for OPT's weekly series to be divided between two network affiliates and run mainly on weekends in off hours. In a given market, the local CBS station might carry Entertainment Tonight (in the prime-access slot), Solid Gold, and Lifestyles of the Rich and Famous while the ABC affiliate had Star Search.

- Testimony of Two Men (1977)
- The Bastard (1978)
- Evening in Byzantium (1978)
- The Immigrants (1978)
- The Rebels (1979)
- The Seekers (1979)
- Jack Frost (1979) (produced by Rankin/Bass Productions)
- Top of the Hill (1980)
- Condominium (1980)
- The Girl, the Gold Watch & Everything (1980)
- The Dream Merchants (1980)
- Tourist (1980)
- Solid Gold (1980–1988) (produced by Paramount Domestic Television)
- Mom, the Wolfman and Me (1980)
- Yogi's First Christmas (1980) (produced by Hanna-Barbera Productions)
- Goliath Awaits (1981)
- A Woman Called Golda (1982)
- Sadat (1983) (produced by Columbia Pictures Television)
- Blood Feud (1983)
- Helen Keller: The Miracle Continues (1984)
- The Jesse Owens Story (1984)
- Solid Gold Hits (1984)
- A Woman of Substance (1985)
- The Key to Rebecca (1985)
- Jenny's War (1985)
- Hold the Dream (1986)

== Stations ==
City	Call sign	Channel
Atlanta	WSB-TV	2
Atlanta	WAGA-TV	5
Baltimore	WBAL-TV	11
Baton Rouge	WVLA-TV	33
Birmingham	WBRC-TV	6
Boston	WNAC-TV/ WNEV-TV	7
Boston	WLVI	56
Charlotte	WBTV	3
Chicago	WGN-TV	9
Cincinnati	WKRC-TV	12
Cleveland	WUAB	43
Columbus	WTVN-TV	6
Detroit	WKBD-TV	50
Windsor / Detroit	CBET-DT	9
Dothan	WDHN	18
El Dorado / Monroe	KTVE	10
Fort Wayne	WKJG-TV	33
Fort Worth	KTVT	11
Fort Worth	KTXA	21
Greenville	WHNS	21
Johnstown	WJAC-TV	6
Kansas City	WDAF-TV	4
Kansas City	KSHB-TV	41
Lafayette	KADN-TV	15
Lake Charles / Beaumont-Port Arthur-Orange	KVHP	29
Lansing	WILX-TV	10
Lima	WLIO	35
Los Angeles	KTLA	5
Los Angeles	KCOP-TV	13
Miami	WCIX	6
Milwaukee	WVTV	18
New Orleans	WGNO	26
New York	WPIX	11
Oakland / San Francisco	KTVU	2
Omaha	KETV	7
Philadelphia	WTAF	29
Pittsburgh	WPXI	11
Portland, Maine	WCSH	6
Portland, Oregon	KPTV	12
Providence	WPRI-TV	12
Roanoke	WDBJ	7
Rochester	WUHF	31
Rock Island / Quad Cities	WHBF-TV	4
St. Petersburg / Tampa / Sarasota	WTOG	44
Saint Paul / Minneapolis	KSTP-TV	5
San Diego / Tijuana	XETV	6
Schenectady / Albany	WRGB	6
Seattle	KSTW	11
Shreveport - Texarkana	KTBS	3
Shreveport - Texarkana	KMSS	33
Spokane	KREM	2
Spokane	KXLY-TV	4
Springfield	WWLP	22
St. Louis	KPLR-TV	11
Toledo	WGTE-TV	30
Washington, D.C.	WDCA	20
Waterbury / Hartford / New Haven	WTXX-TV	20

== See also ==
- Fourth television network
- Mobil Showcase Network
- SFM Holiday Network
- Paramount Television Service
