= Lyle Engel =

American book producer

Lyle Kenyon Engel (c.1915 – August 10, 1986) was an American magazine publisher and book producer. Taking over the family business after his father's death, Engel made the company the largest publisher of lyric magazines in the country. He later founded Book Creations, Inc., which became one of the most successful "fiction factories" in the United States, hiring writers to write books to Engel's outlines which he sold to paperback publishers. Engel's most successful series was The Kent Family Chronicles by John Jakes.

== Early life and education ==
Engel was born in New York City. At age 12, Engel contracted osteomyelitis after breaking his leg in a neighborhood football game and had 30 major surgical operations over the next eight years. His time in hospitals and recuperating was spent reading.

His father, also named Lyle Engel, was a magazine publisher. His father published Radio Mirror, Love Mirror, and Song Hits. He worked for his father's business as a child, earning $5 a week.

Engel graduated from New York University.

== Song lyric magazines ==
After his father's death in 1939, Engel took over the business. Engels formed exclusive agreements to reprint song lyrics with nearly 50 music publishers for the Song Hits and Popular Hit Songs magazines. By 1946, Engel was the country's largest publisher of lyric magazines. Engel objected to record producers publishing booklets of song lyrics that promoted their records, as his contracts with approximately 60 music publishers gave him exclusive publication rights to the lyrics, and he convinced many of them to discontinue the practice.

After expanding his magazine operations to Canada, Engel became aware of illegal lyric sheets being distributed in the country. His three-month investigation led to a case before the Supreme Court of Canada which issued a writ affirming the exclusive publication rights held by Engel's Song Lyrics, Inc. and ONS Lyrics of Canada, Ltd.

By 1948, sales of lyric magazines had dropped significantly, while the costs of paper, printing, and distributing had greatly increased. Engel had also reduced the number of contracts with music publishers. After selling his lyric magazines to the Charlton Publishing Company in 1949, Engel founded the Checkerbooks company which reprinted books by noted writers.

After selling Song Hits, he promoted movies during the 1950s. He also created several non-fiction books by his friend, Pearl S. Buck. In 1961, Engel, with Harold Friedman, began a venture called Sports in Sound with Sports Afield magazine and the Fawcett magazine chain to produce mag-disk albums on topics tied in to the magazines.

== Book producing ==
Engel founded Book Creations, Inc. in 1973 in Canaan, New York. His wife, Marla, and son worked for Book Creations as well. Engel's usual approach was to come up with an idea for an overall series and then outline each book in the series. He sold the series to a paperback publisher, and then hired a writer to author the series. Engel's factory employed in-house editors to ensure that the manuscripts submitted by the writers follow the formula for the series. He credited the years that he spent reading as a youth during frequent hospitalizations as his source of ideas.

Book Creations, Inc. was one of the most successful "fiction factories". Engel received 50% of the royalties from the paperback publishers of those books. Advance payment from publishers to Engels generally ran between $15,000 and $150,000, and he spent much of the advances on publicity. He also controlled subsidiary rights to each book. His company worked with 80 writers, half of whom were under exclusive contract. Engel packaged over 236 titles with more than 60 million books in sales. His promotions of books included gimmick items, a car raffle, and coffee mugs. In 1982, he had 17 series in progress and was planning another 13 series.

Engel's most successful series was The Kent Family Chronicles, authored by John Jakes. Engel formed the idea of The Kent Family Chronicles to coincide with the United States Bicentennial. It is estimated that author John Jakes earned nearly $1 million in royalties from his projects with Engel. Other series produced by Engel include:

- The Australians series, written by Vivian Stuart using the penname William Stuart Long
- The White Indian series, written by Noel Gerson using the penname Donald Clayton Porter
- The Wagons West series, written by Gerson using the penname Dana Fuller Ross
- The Stagecoach Station series, written by D. B. Newton using the penname Hank Mitchum

Engel saw himself as both agent and editor for his writers. Publishers and his writers valued his input on the stories. Noel Gerson, who wrote the Wagons West and White Indian series, said of Engel, "When he says 'I like that. Let's develop it' or 'I don't like that', you can hear a million readers talking." People magazine called him "the paperback prince".

At the time of his death, the eight volumes of The Kent Family Chronicles had sold 35 million copies, and 23 million copies of the 16 volumes of Wagons West were in print. It was estimated that more than 100 million copies of books produced by Engels were in print when he died.

== Personal life and death ==
Engel's first wife, Beatrice, died in 1975. He then married actress Marla Ray. Engel had one son who worked in the book producing business with him. In 1983, Engels and his wife moved to Boca Raton, Florida. Engel died of leukemia on August 10, 1986, in Miami, Florida.
