= Mention My Name in Atlantis =

1972 novel written by John Jakes

- Cover of first edition
- Author: John Jakes
- Cover artist: H. J. Bruck
- Language: English
- Genre: Fantasy
- Publisher: DAW Books
- Publication date: 1972
- Publication place: United States
- Media type: Print (Paperback)

Mention My Name in Atlantis, being, at last, the true account of the calamitous destruction of the great island kingdom together with a narrative of its wondrous intercourses with a superior race of other-worldlings, as transcribed from the manuscript of a survivor, Hoptor the Vintner, for the enlightenment of a dubious posterity is a humorous fantasy novel written by John Jakes purporting to give the "true" history of the sinking of the lost continent of Atlantis. It was first published in paperback by DAW Books in October 1972, and reprinted by the same publisher in September 1975 and August 1976; the later printings featured new cover art by Michael Whelan. A new paperback edition with an added introduction by the author was published by Bart Books in January 1988, and an ebook edition was issued by Open Road Integrated Media in December 2014. The book has also been translated into German and Italian.

== Plot ==
The story is told by the unreliable narrator Hoptor the Vintner, a fast-talking operator with all the right contacts who is convinced in the face of mounting evidence to the contrary that he can smooth over anything. "Mention my name" is his tagline, meant to assure his auditors that dropping it in various quarters is their ticket to getting whatever they want. The book combines a number of cliches of the literature and pseudoscience regarding Atlantis, such as extraterrestrial visitors, as well as of the fantasy genre in general, most notably the ambitious barbarian brute, Conax of Chimeria, a satire on Robert E. Howard's sword and sorcery hero Conan of Cimmeria.

== Reception ==
Lester del Rey described the satire as "good-natured and sometimes amusing," but felt the idea of writing a humorous sword-and-sorcery novel was misconceived.

According to L. Sprague de Camp the book is "[h]ilarious but suffers from the weakness of a book-length burlesque: the difficulty of keeping up the standard of the beginning."
