= The Mark of the Demons =

1969 fantasy novel by John Jakes

- First edition
- Author: John Jakes
- Cover artist: Michael Leonard
- Language: English
- Series: Brak series
- Genre: Fantasy
- Published: 1969 (Paperback Library)
- Publication place: United States
- Media type: Print (Paperback)
- Pages: 159
- OCLC: 4027041
- Preceded by: Witch of the Four Winds
- Followed by: When the Idols Walked

The Mark of the Demons is a fantasy novel by American writer John Jakes, featuring his sword and sorcery hero Brak the Barbarian.

== Publication history ==
The novel was first published under the title Brak the Barbarian Versus the Mark of the Demons in paperback by Paperback Library in September 1969. It was reprinted by Pocket Books in September 1977, and by Tower Books (under the shortened title Brak Vs. The Mark of the Demons) in 1981. British editions were issued under the author's preferred title The Mark of the Demons by Tandem in 1970 (reprinted in 1976) and Star/W. H. Allen in March 1988. The book was also issued under this title in audio-cassette by Sunset Productions in 1994. It was later gathered together with Brak the Barbarian and two stories from The Fortunes of Brak into the omnibus collection Brak the Barbarian / Mark of the Demons, published as an ebook by Open Road Integrated Media in July 2012. The novel has been translated into German

== Plot ==
Continuing his quest to reach the glorious southern realm of Khurdisan the Golden, Brak, a blond, braided, and broadsword-wielding barbarian from the frozen north, crosses the desolate desert of Logol. By chance, he meets a duo of royal twins whose throne has been usurped, and they seek a champion to restore them. But their motives are dubious, their word untrustworthy, and behind all lurks the menace of the corrupt and evil cult of the demon god Yob-Haggoth, whose followers bear unrelenting hatred towards Brak.

== Reception ==
L. Sprague de Camp, commenting on the book together with Witch of the Four Winds, likens Brak to Gardner Fox's barbarian hero Kothar, calling the character "a virtual twin of" Fox's. "Jakes uses a very small cast of characters, and poor Brak is starved, frozen, and exhausted most of the time. Instead of wearing a warm coat and pants like any sensible Northerner, he runs around in freezing weather naked but for that damned lion skin (with tail). Still, pretty good fun."

The novel was also reviewed by Richard Rieve in Son of the WSFA Journal no. 24, 1971.
