= Charleston (novel) =

- Author: John Jakes
- Language: English
- Genre: Historical fiction
- Published: 2002
- Publisher: Dutton
- Publication place: USA
- Pages: 464
- ISBN: 978-0-525-94650-2

Charleston is a 2002 family saga novel by John Jakes. It tells the story of the Bell family, founded by Sydney Greech, who retitled his last name and spawned the clan. The bulk of the book is set in the lead-up to the American Civil War, with a brotherly rivalrous love triangle taking center stage.
