= The Time Curve =

- Cover of first edition
- Editors: Sam Moskowitz and Roger Elwood
- Language: English
- Genre: Science fiction
- Publisher: Tower Books
- Publication date: 1968
- Publication place: United States
- Media type: Print (paperback)
- Pages: 189

The Time Curve is an American anthology of science fiction short stories edited by Sam Moskowitz and Roger Elwood. It was first published in paperback by Tower Books in 1968.

The book collects nine novelettes and short stories by various science fiction authors.

== Contents ==
- "Unto Him That Hath" (Lester del Rey)
- "Nice Girl with 5 Husbands" (Fritz Leiber)
- "Death of a Dinosaur" (Sam Moskowitz)
- "Terror Out of Time" (Jack Williamson)
- "Time Wounds All Heels" (Robert Bloch)
- "Over the River and Through the Woods" (Clifford D. Simak)
- "A Gun for Dinosaur" (L. Sprague de Camp)
- "Operation Peep" (John Wyndham)
- "The Great Judge" (A. E. van Vogt)
- "The Gifts of Asti" (Andre Norton)
