= Explorers of the Infinite =

1963 work of collective biography by Sam Moskowitz

- First edition
- Author: Sam Moskowitz
- Cover artist: Ellen Raskin
- Language: English
- Subject: biography
- Publisher: World Publishing Company
- Publication date: 1963
- Publication place: United States
- Media type: Print (Hardback)
- Pages: 353 pp.
- OCLC: 66128692
- LC Class: PN3448.S45 M65
- Followed by: Seekers of Tomorrow

Explorers of the Infinite: Shapers of Science Fiction is a work of collective biography on the formative authors of the science fiction genre by Sam Moskowitz, first published in hardcover by the World Publishing Company in 1963, and reprinted in trade paperback in 1966. A photographic reprint of the original edition was issued in both hardcover and trade paperback by Hyperion Press in 1974. Most of its chapters are revised versions of articles that initially appeared in the magazines Satellite Science Fiction and Fantastic Science Fiction Stories from 1958-1960.

The work presents the early history of the genre via a discussion of the lives and works of eighteen of its most important formative authors, followed by a more general discussion of more recent writers.

== Contents ==
1. "Introduction"
2. "Cyrano DeBergerac - Swordsman of Space"
3. "The Sons of Frankenstein" (Mary Wollstonecraft Shelley)
4. "The Prophetic Edgar Allan Poe"
5. "The Fabulous Fantast, Fitz-James O'Brien"
6. "Around the Worlds With Jules Verne"
7. "The Real Earth Satellite Story" (Edward Everett Hale)
8. "Ghosts of Prophecies Past, or, Frank Reade, Jr. and 'Forgotten Chapters in American History'"
9. "The Wonders of H. G. Wells"
10. "The World, the Devil, and M. P. Shiel"
11. "Arthur Conan Doyle - A Study in Science Fiction"
12. "To Barsoom and Back with Edgar Rice Burroughs"
13. "The Marvelous A. Merritt"
14. "Karel Capek: The Man Who Invented Robots"
15. "Hugo Gernsback: 'Father of Science Fiction'"
16. "The Lore of H. P. Lovecraft"
17. "Olaf Stapledon: Cosmic Philosopher"
18. "Space Opus: Philip Wylie"
19. "Dawn of Fame: The Career of Stanley G. Weinbaum"
20. "How Science Fiction Got Its Name"
21. "The Future in Present Tense"

== Reception ==
Theodore Sturgeon, although noting the book's many imperfections, praised Explorers of the Infinite, saying "no one has surveyed the roots of SF as well as Mr. M.; probably no one ever will; prossibly [sic], no one else can."

Kirkus Reviews, while recognizing Moskowitz's tracing of the genre to "Odysseus' Trojan horse and such devices as Arthur's incredibly able sword Excalibur, the Houyhnhnms of Gulliver's Travels, Mary Shelley's Frankenstein, Dr. Jekyll and Mr. Hyde, the historical Cyrano de Bergerac's A Voyage to the Moon (1650), Robinson Crusoe, and even ... Moby Dick," saw the book largely as the author's paen to Amazing Stories, "the great si-fi pulp mag of the Thirties, which [he] here apostrophizes as an American efflorescence of the scientific imagination." It noted with apparent approval the fact that "Jules Verne and H. G. Wells get whole chapters, but [also that] a fantastically vast up-literature of sci-fi exists from the turn of this century and before Amazing started in 1926 (all of it composed by authors less than amazingly memorable to many a living librarian)."
