= Greg Tobin =

American novelist

Greg Tobin is an American editor, publisher, journalist and author. He worked as an executive in the book publishing industry in New York City for more than 20 years, including stints as vice president and editor in chief of Book of the Month Club (then a division of Time Warner) and senior vice president and editor in chief of Ballantine Books (a division of Random House).

Tobin is the author of many books including Successor: Unshrouding Mysteries of the Conclave, Was Jesus Really Born on Christmas? (2011), and Saints and Sinners (1999). In 2022, he was appointed president of RENEW, a nonprofit organization that supports and develops small community groups within Catholic parishes.

== Career ==
For a few years Tobin was an independent writer and journalist, and then was appointed editor of The Catholic Advocate, the biweekly newspaper of the Roman Catholic Archdiocese of Newark, New Jersey; following which he served in senior administrative positions at Seton Hall University in South Orange, New Jersey, including interim vice president of the Division of University Advancement. From 2015 to 2021, Tobin was the General Manager of Alcoholics Anonymous World Services, Inc., a non-profit publishing and service organization.

Tobin's first published book was Season of Power (co-authored with Sam Tanenhaus), published in 1981 by Tower Books, an independent paperback publishing house associated with his then-employer, Leisure Books. He wrote more than a dozen western novels under his own name, as well as pseudonyms, including Steelman's Way, Jericho, Kid Stark, Big Horn, and Prairie. In the late 1990s he turned to nonfiction and fiction with the Catholic Church as his subject. He has written two Catholic-interest novels, Conclave and Council,

During the news coverage of Pope John Paul II's death and the papal conclave that followed, Tobin appeared frequently on television and radio programs as an expert on the Catholic Church, and upon the resignation of Pope Benedict XVI and subsequent election of Pope Francis, he was sought after as a commentator on the church and the papacy. In 2012 he published The Good Pope, a biography of Pope John XXIII, who was canonized in 2014, when Tobin was called upon again to speak and appear in various media for commentary on the topic of St. John XXIII's canonization.

He resides in West Orange, New Jersey.

== Books (partial listing) ==
- Season of Power (Tower Books, 1981)
- Holy Holidays!
- Selecting the Pope
- The Wisdom of St. Patrick
- Saints and Sinners
- The Good Pope
- Holy Father
- Religion in America (co-general editor)
