= Bang Bang Kid =

1967 film

- DVD cover for 'Bang Bang Kid'
- Directed by: Giorgio Gentili; Luciano Lelli
- Written by: José Luis Bayonas
- Produced by: Sidney W. Pink; Mirko Purgatori
- Starring: Tom Bosley; Guy Madison; Sandra Milo; Mark High; Dyanik Zurakowska
- Cinematography: Antonio Macasoli
- Edited by: Ornella Micheli
- Music by: Nico Fidenco
- Distributed by: Troma Entertainment
- Release date: 1967
- Running time: 87 minutes
- Language: English

Bang Bang Kid is a 1967 Italian-Spanish Western film, produced by Sidney W. Pink and starring Tom Bosley. The film was distributed in America by Troma Entertainment.

== Plot ==
The plot revolves around a madcap inventor who constructs a mechanical gunfighter to fight against a tyrannical crime lord.

== Reception ==
A retrospective review calls Bang Bang Kid "a surprisingly charming little film", but wonders why the DVD version is only 75 minute long.
