= Brak the Barbarian =

1968 short-fiction collection by John Jakes

- First edition
- Author: John Jakes
- Cover artist: Frank Frazetta
- Language: English
- Series: Brak series
- Genre: Fantasy
- Published: 1968 (Avon Books)
- Publication place: United States
- Media type: Print (Paperback)
- Pages: 173
- OCLC: 7434728
- Followed by: Witch of the Four Winds

Brak the Barbarian is a short-fiction collection by American writer John Jakes, featuring his sword and sorcery hero of the same name.

== Publication history ==
The individual stories titled "Ghosts of Stone" and "The Courts of the Conjuror" originally appeared, in a different form, as "The Pillars of Chambalor" and "The Silk of Shaitan" in the magazine Fantastic v. 14, no. 3 (March 1965) and no. 4 (April 1965), respectively. The April 1965 issue featured the Brak story in its title illustration. As a novel, Brak the Barbarian was first published in paperback by Avon Books in July 1968. It was reprinted by Pocket Books in July 1977, by Tower Books in April 1981, and (as a trade paperback) by e-reads.com in 1999. It was reissued in trade paperback and ebook by Pulp Hero Press in December 2020. British editions were issued by Tandem in 1970 (reprinted in 1976) and Star/W. H. Allen in December 1987. The short-story collection was also gathered together with The Mark of the Demons and two stories from The Fortunes of Brak into the omnibus collection Brak the Barbarian / Mark of the Demons, published as an e-book by Open Road Integrated Media in July 2012. It has been translated into German and Japanese.

== Plot ==
Brak, a blond, braided, and broadsword-wielding barbarian from the frozen north, is an outcast from his people for questioning the traditional war gods. He seeks to reach the glorious southern realm of Khurdisan the Golden, rumors of which have reached even his country. The stories (and indeed the series) deal with Brak's episodic quest as he overcomes threat after threat, with the dream of Khurdisan ever before him.

His first stop is the city of Kambda Kai, once great but now afflicted by worshipers of the demon god Yob-Haggoth. Here, as well, his religious skepticism gets Brak in trouble, immediately bringing him into conflict with the corrupt and evil cult. Destined to be sacrificed to the evil god, Brak wins his freedom—but the demon worshipers and their foul monsters infest all the lands between him and his goal, and in consequence every step of his journey brings new challenges.

There is the evil, soul-taking Septegundus, who promises a dire revenge for Brak's humbling of himself and his dark god. Later, Brak is enslaved at the terrible mines of King Ushiram of Toct and starts a slave rebellion; confronts the conjurer Ankhma Ra whose Silk of Shaitan can rip the living heart out of anyone it touches; battles the treacherous Zama Khan at the ruins of cursed Chambalor and frees thousands of ghosts who had been trapped there in prolonged torment; and saves the life and throne of Queen Rhea of Phrixos (after she first saved him at considerable risk to herself) averting her enforced betrothal to the odious Lord of the Tigers.

In nearly every episode Brak also confronts a gigantic monster of one kind or another—some of them cultivated by human villains, others seeking human prey on their own account: The Doomdog, haunting the caverns of Toct; the Fangfish, in a deep pool at a sinister mountain pass above the realm of Tazim, Lord of the Tilling; T'Muk, The Thing which Crawls, a highly poisonous giant spider at Chambalor's desert; and a giant scavenger slug, which in the aftermath of battles at Phrixos feeds on dead (and wounded) soldiers.

Though a most formidable fighter when aroused, Brak is not particularly bloodthirsty or aggressive. In most cases, many of the villains he fights have picked a fight with him in the first place (a costly mistake). Nor is he especially greedy, several times turning up chances to win great treasure. His wants are limited to a few dinshas in his purse, enough to buy food, a pony to ride on (several of the poor beasts get killed in the course of the book and need replacing) and, of course, a properly sharp broadsword, without which he feels naked.

Brak acts according to his own strict code of honor. He keeps his word, once given, even when knowing his "civilized" interlocutor intends to double-cross him at the first opportunity. He has a strong inhibition against harming women, even vile women who mock his honor and try their worst to harm him. Indeed, in the early episodes, Brak encounters an entire collection of very nasty women (Examples: The demonic immortal witch Ariane, who wants his soul; the cruel and sadistic Princess Vian; the wanton and corrupt Princess Jardine). In later parts, this is counterbalanced by the warm-hearted Dareet, Zama Khan's daughter who deplores her father's evil ways, and later Queen Rhea, a veritable paragon of virtues.

Good women or bad, Brak is clearly determined not to settle down in any one place, but rather continue on his endless, Quixiotic quest for fabled Khurdisan. Even when a young, beautiful, and courageous queen is deeply in love with him, he firmly if regretfully declines her offer. The heartbroken queen, left behind, vows to await his return, for decades if need be, and take no other consort—but Brak sets out on further wanderings and has many more adventures, detailed in the various sequels.

== Christian elements ==
Though set in a fictional world, with its own complicated history, Brak early on encounters a religion bearing strong resemblance to Christianity—the Nestorians, followers of a religion founded by the goat-herd Nestoriamus, who believe in a universal "Nameless God" whose symbol is the Cross. They are reminiscent of the Nestorians of our own world, involved in a centuries-long effort to spread Christianity in the Far East. Though not a convert to their religion, Brak is sympathetic to its adherents, like the fatherly Friar Jerome—especially since their god is the mortal enemy of the evil demon god Yob-Haggoth, which by definition makes them Brak's allies. To Brak's protestation that "I am not a child of your god," Jerome replies "You are his child but you do not know it." Later on, when helping Dareet bury her evil and cynical father, who had followed no god, Brak fashions a rude cross to put on his grave.

The scene where the demonic Ariane in her flying chariot shows Brak all the wondrous kingdoms of the world and promises them to him in return for his soul is clearly reminiscent of the Temptation of Jesus in the New Testament, where Satan showed Jesus "all the kingdoms of the world, and the glory of them." The basic assumption made in that episode—that the minions of evil may physically bind you but can never take your soul unless you voluntarily surrender it—clearly follows the teachings of Christian theology on that issue.

== Reception ==
Lin Carter calls Brak the Barbarian "a splendid job," "one of the best Sword and Sorcery books of the year, and marvelous entertainment." He notes "[t]he Brak stories are unabashedly Conanesque in style and flavor: Howard's hero formed the pattern for the genre and John Jakes has limited himself to working in strict traditional confines. Where he differs from the Howardian method, however, he produces excellences and delights. A certain strain of imaginative invention all his own permeates these stories." His "imaginative fertility fill[s] the book with a freshness, originality, and color that is Jakes' alone."

The book was also reviewed by Richard Brisson in Sword & Fantasy no. 9, September 2008.

A Brak the Barbarian story, "Spell of the Dragon", appeared in Marvel Comics' Chamber of Chills 2 anthology series comic, January 1973. Original story by John Jakes, creator of Brak the Barbarian, with artwork by Val Mayerik.
