= Witch of the Four Winds =

1969 fantasy novel by John Jakes

- First edition
- Author: John Jakes
- Cover artist: Frank Frazetta
- Language: English
- Series: Brak series
- Genre: Fantasy
- Published: 1969 (Paperback Library)
- Publication place: United States
- Media type: Print (Paperback)
- Pages: 160
- OCLC: 2304648
- Preceded by: Brak the Barbarian
- Followed by: The Mark of the Demons

Witch of the Four Winds is a fantasy novel by American writer John Jakes, featuring his sword and sorcery hero Brak the Barbarian.

== Publication history ==
The story was first published in the magazine Fantastic Stories of Imagination as a two-part serial in the issues for November and December 1963. It was first published in book form in paperback by Paperback Library in April 1969, with the title changed to Brak the Barbarian Versus the Sorceress. It was reprinted by Pocket Books in November 1977, and by Tower Books (under the shortened title Brak vs. The Sorceress) in 1981. British editions were issued under the title The Sorceress by Tandem in July 1970 (reprinted in 1976) and Star/W. H. Allen in February 1988. It was later, with the original title restored, gathered together with When the Idols Walked and two stories from The Fortunes of Brak into the omnibus collection Witch of the Four Winds / When the Idols Walked, published as an ebook by Open Road Integrated Media in July 2012. The novel has been translated into German

== Plot summary ==
Brak, a blond, braided, and broadsword-wielding barbarian from the frozen north, continues his quest to reach the glorious southern realm of Khurdisan the Golden. In a desolate country, he encounters malevolent magic. Boulders fall in a soundless rain, and a mysterious old stranger appears to know all about him. An invisible horror tears his pony to shreds. It seems he has some mystical foe against whom no mundane weapon can avail.

After saving a shepherdess from the monstrous Manworm, Brak reaches the city of Lord Strann, who rules the region as best he can but is threatened by the alchemist Nordica and her servant, the wizard Tamar Zed. Much of Strann's army has been lured to Nordica's side in the expectation of riches; Nordica's father possessed the knowledge of how to transmute base metal into gold, a secret for which she is thought to have murdered him.

Brak, attempting to aid Strann, is caught by Nordica, joining three other captives—the girl he had previously rescued, an aged sailor, and a duplicitous smith. All four are slated to be sacrificed in a rite to make the gold. They attempt escape, are betrayed, and face more menace from the Manworm along with Nordica's bestial familiar Scarletjaw. Ultimately, Brak is victorious.

Refusing the amorous advances of the grateful shepherd girl, whose attentions he diverts towards Strann's son and heir, Brak continues his journey towards Khurdisan.

== Reception ==
L. Sprague de Camp, commenting on the book together with The Mark of the Demons, likens Brak to Gardner Fox's barbarian hero Kothar, calling the character "a virtual twin of" Fox's. "Jakes uses a very small cast of characters, and poor Brak is starved, frozen, and exhausted most of the time. Instead of wearing a warm coat and pants like any sensible Northerner, he runs around in freezing weather naked but for that damned lion skin (with tail). Still, pretty good fun."
