= When the Idols Walked =

1978 fantasy novel by John Jakes

- First edition
- Author: John Jakes
- Cover artist: Charles Moll
- Language: English
- Series: Brak series
- Genre: Fantasy
- Published: 1978 (Pocket Books)
- Publication place: United States
- Media type: Print (Paperback)
- Pages: 158
- ISBN: 0-671-81373-0
- Preceded by: The Mark of the Demons
- Followed by: The Fortunes of Brak

When the Idols Walked is a fantasy novel by American writer John Jakes, featuring his sword and sorcery hero Brak the Barbarian.

== Publication history ==
The story was first published in the magazine Fantastic Stories of Imagination as a two-part serial in the issues for August and September 1964, the first of which featured the story in its cover illustration. It was first published in book form as a paperback by Pocket Books in February 1978, with When the Idols Walked as the title page title and Brak: When the Idols Walked as the cover title. The latter was also adopted for the second edition, also in paperback, issued by Tower Books in 1981. The novel was later gathered together with Witch of the Four Winds and two stories from The Fortunes of Brak into the omnibus collection Witch of the Four Winds / When the Idols Walked, published as an ebook by Open Road Integrated Media in July 2012. The book has been translated into German.

== Plot ==
Continuing his quest to reach the glorious southern realm of Khurdisan the Golden, Brak, a blond, braided, and broadsword-wielding barbarian from the frozen north, reaches the sea, where he hopes to find a ship to bring him to his goal. However, his party is attacked by raiders who capture him and consign him to servitude as a galley slave. And he soon learns that the sea contains far worse horrors as well, most notably an idol animated by the spirit of a witch seeking vengeance against her betrayers.
