= That's Hollywood =

- Country of origin: United States

Production
- Running time: 30 minutes
- Production company: 20th Century Fox Television

Original release
- Network: Syndication
- Release: 1976 – 1982

That's Hollywood is an American syndicated documentary television series that was produced from 1976 to 1982 and aired for 74 episodes. It was produced by 20th Century Fox Television.

Narrated by Tom Bosley and then Anthony Franciosa, the series is a tongue-in-cheek exploration of the history of Hollywood film content in its various aspects, featuring numerous clips of different feature films, predominantly from the 20th Century Fox library.
