= The Fortunes of Brak =

1980 collection of short stories by John Jakes

- First edition
- Author: John Jakes
- Cover artist: George Bush
- Language: English
- Series: Brak series
- Genre: Fantasy
- Published: 1980 (Dell Books)
- Publication place: United States
- Media type: Print (paperback)
- Pages: 255
- ISBN: 0-440-12787-4
- Preceded by: When the Idols Walked

The Fortunes of Brak is a collection of fantasy short stories by American writer John Jakes featuring his sword and sorcery hero Brak the Barbarian. It includes all Brak stories not previously gathered into the earlier books in the series.

== Publication history ==
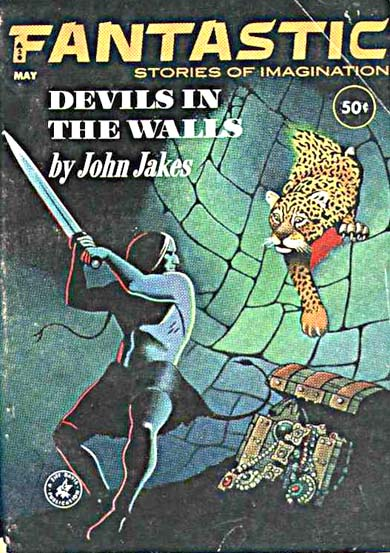
The first Brak story, "Devils in the Walls", originally published in Fantastic in 1963

The individual pieces were originally published in various magazines and anthologies. The collection as a whole was first published in paperback by Dell Books in January 1980, and reprinted in 1985. Its first two stories were later gathered together with Brak the Barbarian and The Mark of the Demons into the omnibus collection Brak the Barbarian / Mark of the Demons, while its last two stories were combined with Witch of the Four Winds and When the Idols Walked into the omnibus collection Witch of the Four Winds / When the Idols Walked, both published as ebooks by Open Road Integrated Media in July 2012. The third story was left out of both omnibuses.

== Contents ==
- "Devils in the Walls" (from Fantastic Stories of Imagination v. 12, no. 5, May 1963, which featured the story in its title illustration)
- "Ghoul's Garden" (from Flashing Swords! #2, Sep. 1973)
- "The Girl in the Gem" (from Fantastic Stories of Imagination v. 14, no. 1, Jan. 1965, which featured the story in its title illustration)
- "Brak in Chains" (originally "Storm in a Bottle," from Flashing Swords! #4: Barbarians and Black Magicians, Spring 1977)
- "The Mirror of Wizardry" (from Worlds of Fantasy v. 1, no. 1, Sep. 1968)
