= Seekers of Tomorrow =

1965 collective biography by Sam Moskowitz

- Cover of Seekers of Tomorrow
- Author: Sam Moskowitz
- Language: English
- Subject: biography
- Publisher: World Publishing Company
- Publication date: 1965
- Publication place: United States
- Media type: Print (Hardback)
- Pages: 441 pp.
- OCLC: 00333038
- Dewey Decimal: 809.3876
- LC Class: PN3448.S45 M66 1966
- Preceded by: Explorers of the Infinite

Seekers of Tomorrow: Masters of Modern Science Fiction is a work of collective biography on the formative authors of the science fiction genre by Sam Moskowitz, first published in hardcover by the World Publishing Company in 1965. The first paperback edition was issued by Ballantine Books in October, 1967. A photographic reprint of the original edition was issued in both hardcover and trade paperback by Hyperion Press in 1974. Most of its chapters are revised versions of articles that initially appeared in the magazine Amazing Stories from 1961 to 1964.

The work presents the history of the genre from 1928 through 1964 via a discussion of the lives and works of twenty-two of its most important early writers. After a general introduction, individual chapters deal with particular authors, followed by a general survey of later or lesser writers (including C. S. Lewis, James Blish, Walter M. Miller, Jr., L. Ron Hubbard, Hal Clement, Ross Rocklynne, Poul Anderson, Cyril M. Kornbluth, Frederik Pohl, Alfred Bester, Edgar Pangborn, Kurt Vonnegut, Jr., Philip K. Dick, Ward Moore, John Hersey, John Christopher and Frank Herbert), an epilogue and an index.

== Contents ==
- "Introduction"
1. "E. E. Smith, Ph. D."
2. "John W. Campbell"
3. "Murray Leinster"
4. "Edmond Hamilton"
5. "Jack Williamson"
6. "Superman" (Mort Weisinger)
7. "John Wyndham"
8. "Eric Frank Russell"
9. "L. Sprague de Camp"
10. "Lester del Rey"
11. "Robert A. Heinlein"
12. "A. E. van Vogt"
13. "Theodore Sturgeon"
14. "Isaac Asimov"
15. "Clifford D. Simak"
16. "Fritz Leiber"
17. "C. L. Moore"
18. "Henry Kuttner"
19. "Robert Bloch". A reprint of Moskowitz's essay "Psycho-logical Bloch" which had appeared several times previously, including as afterword to Bloch's Bogey Men (1963).
20. "Ray Bradbury"
21. "Arthur C. Clarke"
22. "Philip José Farmer"
23. "Starburst"
- "Epilogue"
- "Index"

== Reception ==
Reviewing Seekers of Tomorrow, Algis Budrys noted that "Moskowitz is a master of denotation. He wouldn't know a connotation if it snapped at his ankle, which is something that happens quite often". He added, however, that "Moskowitz knows and transmits, at least as much about the history of science fiction and its evolution, as anyone possibly could ... there is no other book like it". Kirkus Reviews called the work "a truly gratifying book ... [w]hat is satisfying is to see these authors deeply engaged in works of pure tripe and imagination (Barnum called it hokum) and watch them emerge with a fish so big (macrocosmic) that they become world-renowned. This book should be called Super Time, because each of its subjects is a bit like the success stories in Time--each author has written his Moby Dick of interstellar fantasy. These guys think BIG! These are wild talents pouring out words to oblivion."

== See also ==
- Golden Age of Science Fiction
