= Firth Haring Fabend =

American novelist and historian (born 1937)

- Born: August 12, 1937 (age 89); Tappan, New York, U.S.
- Education: Nyack High School; Barnard College; New York University (PhD)
- Occupations: Novelist; historian

Firth Haring Fabend (born August 12, 1937) is an American novelist and historian. She was born in Tappan, New York, on August 12, 1937, the daughter of James Firth Haring and Elizabeth Adler. She graduated from Nyack High School in Nyack, New York, and is a 1959 graduate of Barnard College, where she majored in English literature. She holds a PhD in American Studies from New York University. She spent her Junior Year at Westfield College of London University. While working in book publishing in New York City and attending graduate school, she published five novels between 1968 and 1985. Three book-length works of history followed in 1991, 2000, 2012 and to date some thirty essays and chapters in books.

== Career ==
Her novels are The Best of Intentions (New York: William Morrow, 1968); Three Women (New York: Belmont-Tower, 1972); A Perfect Stranger (New York: Simon & Schuster, 1973); The Woman Who Went Away (New York: Holt, Rinehart & Winston, 1981); and Greek Revival (New York: E. P. Dutton, 1985). These works were published in both hard- and paperback editions in the U.S., the U.K., France, and various other countries.

Although they were in general favorably reviewed, she became disillusioned, in the 1980s, by developments in the publishing world, gave up fiction writing, and turned to academia. She received a doctorate in American Studies from New York University in 1988, her area of interest being the Dutch colonial period of New York and New Jersey and the legacy of the Dutch in New York and New Jersey into the nineteenth century. Her doctoral dissertation was awarded the New York State Historical Association Annual Manuscript Award in 1989 and the Hendricks Prize of the New Netherland Institute (originally the New Netherland Project) also in 1989. That year, she was made a Charter Fellow of the New Netherland Project and the following year a Fellow of The Holland Society of New York, the second woman to be so honored. The first was Alice P. Kenney.

Her dissertation was published by Rutgers University Press in 1991 as A Dutch Family in the Middle Colonies, 1660–1800. It was prominently reviewed in the major academic journals as a welcome addition to the growing literature on the family, especially as it applied to New York and New Jersey, and for providing a bench mark for studying the family in different epochs. Along with other family studies published at around the same time, it was considered among those works that laid the basis for a genuine study of the early colonial community experience in the eastern United States.

Her second book-length work of history, Zion on the Hudson: Dutch New York and New Jersey in the Age of Revivals, was also published by Rutgers University Press (2000) and was awarded the New Jersey State Annual Archives Award in 2001. Zion on the Hudson, wrote C. H. Lippy in Choice, “along with her earlier A Dutch Family in the Middle Colonies, establishes Fabend as the premier historian of Dutch American culture.”

In 2012, the New Netherland Institute commissioned a book from her that was published as "New Netherland in a Nutshell: A Concise History of the Dutch Colony in North America."

In 2004, with a feminist intent in mind, she organized her notes on the women in the family she had researched for her dissertation (her own Haring family) and turned them into a ten-stanza lyric poem called A Catch of Grandmothers, an introductory stanza and one stanza for each of her nine Haring grandmothers going back to Grietjie Cosyns, born in New Amsterdam in 1641. This bio-historical poem, unique to American letters, was published in book form by the Historical Society of Rockland County in 2004 and is currently in its third printing.

In 2008, after publishing history for twenty years, she returned to the novel form with Land So Fair, a historical novel set in the Hudson Valley in the eighteenth century. Although she considers this her best work of fiction, and although she had an excellent track record in the publishing business, she was obliged to self-publish it for lack of interest by commercial publishers.

Fabend's curiosity about the Dutch colonial period in New York and New Jersey was sparked at first by her learning that her father's family had been instrumental in the settling of Rockland and Bergen counties, beginning in the 1680s.

Felicitously, her interest coincided with and was mightily reinforced by the New Netherland Project, a major translation effort undertaken beginning in 1974 by Dr. Charles T. Gehring in Albany, NY, under the aegis of the State of New York. Gehring's translations and retranslations of the Dutch colonial records and documents, which have been steadily published over the decades since the 1970s, gave rise to a renaissance in the historiography of the Dutch period of New York and New Jersey from which she has benefited not only in substance but in many warm friendships with her colleagues in Dutchness. In 2017, she received the Alice P. Kenney Award from the New Netherland Institute for her contributions to scholarship related to the Dutch colony in North America.

She is a participant in the New York Council for the Humanities Speakers Program as well as its Community Conversations, and she has over the years consulted for the Museum of the City of New York, the American History Workshop, the New Amsterdam History Center, the New York Genealogical and Biographical Society, the Hudson River Museum, the New York State Historical Association, and other institutions concerned with American history. She was elected the first President of the Jacob Leisler Institute for the Study of Early New York History, located in Hudson, NY, in 2014.

In the 1970s, she was invited to deposit her papers in The Twentieth Century Archives, in what is today called The Howard Gotlieb Archival Center, in the Mugar Memorial Library, Boston University. The Firth Haring Collection contains copies of all her works, including a memoir she self-published in 2008, Only a Paper Life, her book contracts for her first five novels, her manuscripts of these novels, and the correspondence and reviews relating to them. (Of Only a Paper Life, Cambridge University English professor Richard Gooder of Clare College wrote, “It remains a little masterpiece. I know nothing else like it.”); personal correspondence, July 22, 2009.

Her genealogical notes and other material on the Haring family are in Special Collections and University Archives in the Alexander Library, Rutgers University, New Brunswick, and also in the manuscript collection of the New York Genealogical and Biographical Society. She is married to E. Carl Fabend, lives in Verona, New Jersey, and has two daughters, three grandchildren, and two step-grandchildren.
