= Sam Moskowitz =

American writer, critic, and historian of science fiction (1920–1997)

- Moskowitz in 1976
- Born: June 30, 1920; Newark, New Jersey
- Died: April 15, 1997 (aged 76); University Hospital, Newark, New Jersey
- Spouse: Christine E. Haycock (after 1958)
- Writing career
- Pen name: Sam Martin
- Genre: Science Fiction

Sam Moskowitz (June 30, 1920 – April 15, 1997) was an American writer, critic, and historian of science fiction.

== Biography ==
As a child, Moskowitz greatly enjoyed reading science fiction pulp magazines. As a teenager, he organized a branch of the Science Fiction League. While still in his teens, Moskowitz became chairman of the first World Science Fiction Convention held in New York City in 1939. He barred several members of the rival Futurians club from the convention because they threatened to disrupt it. This event is referred to by historians of fandom as the "Great Exclusion Act".

In the mid-1940s, Moskowitz founded the Eastern Science Fiction Association (ESFA), a science-fiction fandom organization based in Newark, New Jersey which held conventions. By the early 1950s, he began working professionally in the science fiction field. He edited Science-Fiction Plus, a short-lived genre magazine owned by Hugo Gernsback, in 1953. He compiled about two dozen anthologies, and a few single-author collections, most published in the 1960s and early 1970s. Moskowitz also wrote a handful of short stories (three published in 1941, one in 1953, three in 1956). His most enduring work is likely to be his writing on the history of science fiction, in particular two collections of short author biographies, Explorers of the Infinite and Seekers of Tomorrow, as well as the highly regarded Under the Moons of Mars: A History and Anthology of "The Scientific Romance" in the Munsey Magazines, 1912–1920. His exhaustive cataloging of early sf magazine stories by important genre authors remains the best resource for nonspecialists.

He also taught a course with Robert Frazier.

Theodore Sturgeon, although noting the book's many imperfections, praised Explorers of the Infinite, saying "no one has surveyed the roots of SF as well as Mr. M.; probably no one ever will; prossibly [sic], no one else can."

Reviewing Seekers of Tomorrow, Algis Budrys wryly noted that "Moskowitz is a master of denotation. He wouldn't know a connotation if it snapped at his ankle, which is something that happens quite often." He added, however, that "Moskowitz knows and transmits, at least as much about the history of science fiction and its evolution, as anyone possibly could."

Moskowitz's works include also The Immortal Storm, a historical review of internecine strife within fandom. Moskowitz wrote it in a bombastic style that made the events he described seem so important that, as fan historian Harry Warner Jr. quipped, "If read directly after a history of World War II, it does not seem like an anticlimax." Floyd C. Gale wrote in his review of the book that "[f]ortunately, most of these petulant warriors have since grown up—but their historian is still leading their ghostly legions that are more real than today to him. The miracle is that S-F survived even the love of its most rabid fans". Anthony Boucher noted that "never has so much been written about so little," but added that the book was "a unique document not without a good deal of social and psychological value."

Moskowitz was also renowned as a science fiction book collector, with a tremendous number of important early works and rarities. His book collection was auctioned off after his death.

As "Sam Martin", he was also editor of the trade publications Quick Frozen Foods and Quick Frozen Foods International for many years.

First Fandom, an organization of science fiction fans active before 1940, gives an award in Moskowitz's memory each year at the World Science Fiction Convention.

Moskowitz smoked cigarettes frequently throughout his adult life. A few years before his death, throat cancer required the surgical removal of his larynx. He continued to speak at science fiction conventions, using an electronic voice-box held against his throat. Throughout his later years, although his controversial opinions were often disputed by others, he was recognized as a leading authority on the history of science fiction.

== Works ==
=== Nonfiction ===
- The Immortal Storm: A History of Science Fiction Fandom (1954)
- Explorers of the Infinite: Shapers of Science Fiction (Cleveland: World Pub. Co, 1963)
- Seekers of Tomorrow: Masters of Modern Science Fiction (Westport, Conn: Hyperion Press, 1974, ISBN 0883551292)
- A Canticle for P. Schuyler Miller (1975)
- Science Fiction Calendar 1976 (1975)
- Strange Horizons: The Spectrum of Science Fiction (1976)
- Charles Fort: A Radical Corpuscle (1976)
- Science Fiction in Old San Francisco: History of the Movement, From 1854 to 1890 (1980)
- A. Merritt: Reflections in the Moon Pool (1985) with A. Merritt
- Howard Phillips Lovecraft and Nils Helmer Frome: A Recollection of One of Canada's Earliest Science Fiction Fans (1989)
- After All These Years... (1991)

=== Edited anthologies ===
- Editor's Choice in Science Fiction (1954)
- The Coming of the Robots (1963)
- Exploring Other Worlds (1963)
- Modern Masterpieces of Science Fiction (1965)
- Strange Signposts (with Roger Elwood) (1966)
- Doorway Into Time (1966)
- Masterpieces of Science Fiction (1966)
- Three Stories (1967) (a.k.a. A Sense of Wonder, The Moon Era)
- The Human Zero and Other Science-Fiction Masterpieces (with Roger Elwood) (1967)
- Microcosmic God (1968) (a.k.a. The Microcosmic God)
- Science Fiction by Gaslight: A History and Anthology of Science Fiction in the Popular Magazines, 1891–1911 (Cleveland: World Pub. Co., 1968)
- The Vortex Blasters (1968)
- The Time Curve (with Roger Elwood) (1968)
- Alien Earth and Other Stories (with Roger Elwood) (1969)
- Other Worlds, Other Times (with Roger Elwood) (1969)
- The Man Who Called Himself Poe (Garden City, N.Y.: Doubleday, 1969; a.k.a. A Man Called Poe: Stories in the Vein of Edgar Allan Poe)
- Great Untold Stories of Fantasy and Horror (with Alden H. Norton) (1969)
- Under the Moons of Mars; A History and Anthology of "the Scientific Romance" in the Munsey Magazines, 1912–1920 (New York: Holt, Rinehart and Winston, 1970)
- Futures to Infinity (1970)
- Horrors Unknown (1971)
- The Space Magicians (with Alden H. Norton) (1971)
- Ghostly By Gaslight (with Alden H. Norton) (1971)
- When Women Rule (1972)
- Horrors in Hiding (with Alden H. Norton) (1973)
- The Crystal Man: Stories by Edward Page Mitchell (1973)
- Horrors Unseen (1974)
