= The Seekers (novel) =

1975 historical novel by John Jakes

- First edition
- Author: John Jakes
- Language: English
- Series: The Kent Family Chronicles
- Genre: Historical fiction
- Publication date: 1975
- Publication place: United States
- Media type: Print
- Pages: 544
- ISBN: 0451212495
- Preceded by: The Rebels
- Followed by: The Furies

The Seekers is a historical novel written by John Jakes and originally published in 1975. It is book three in a series known as The Kent Family Chronicles or the American Bicentennial Series. The novel mixes fictional characters with historical events and figures, as it narrates the story of the United States of America from 1794 through 1814. The novel was made into a television film by Operation Prime Time and premiered on HBO on July 8, 1979.

== Plot summary ==
The story begins in 1794, at the Battle of Fallen Timbers, in the Northwest Territory. Abraham Kent, the son of Philip Kent and Anne Ware, leads a cavalry charge in the battle, but misses a chance to kill Tecumseh.

Two years later, Abraham marries his stepsister, Elizabeth Fletcher, and they purchase a tract of land on the Great Miami River, near Fort Hamilton, where begins farming corn. They have a son, Jared Adam, born in 1798. Elizabeth does not enjoy their new life and they plan to move to a more populated area. Just before the move, Elizabeth is killed by a Shawnee Indian. Abraham, distraught, sells the farm and makes his way back to Boston with Jared to learn that his father Philip has recently died.

Abraham meets his half-brother Gilbert and takes a job in the family business, the Kent and Son printers, but the trauma of Elizabeth's death makes him unsuccessful. Abraham decides to leave, but when he tries to take his son with him, his sister-in-law, Harriet, refuses. Abraham pushes her down the stairs, causing her to go into premature labor. Gilbert expels Abraham from his house without Jared, and Harriet gives birth to a daughter, Amanda. Abraham is never seen again.

Jared is raised by Gilbert and Harriet and when he comes of age, he enlists in the U.S. Navy and serves in the War of 1812. During his service, Jared fends off the homosexual advances of a superior officer, Lieutenant Hamilton Stovall.

Gilbert Kent dies of a seizure and Harriet remarries. Her second husband, Andrew Piggott, is a compulsive gambler and womaniser who loses the publishing firm to Lt. Stovall in a game of craps. Jared sets fire to the firm and attempts to kill Stovall, instead shooting an associate of his. Jared and his cousin Amanda flee.

While in Tennessee, near Nashville, Amanda is raped and abducted by William Blackthorn. Jared tracks down Blackthorn and shoots him dead. With his dying breath, Blackthorn tells Jared he sold Amanda to fur traders going up the Missouri River. Jared serves ninety days in jail for disturbing the peace. While in jail, he is visited by Elijah Weatherby. Weatherby, a fur trader, had witnessed Blackthorn's death and he was impressed by Jared. He tells Jared he is going to Indian country to trade and needs a partner. Jared accepts the offer, and they commence their journey in November 1814. The story ends without Jared and Amanda being reunited, but the reader learns that Amanda is alive and was sold by fur traders to an American Indian.

== Adaptation ==
The novel was made into a television film by Operation Prime Time and premiered on HBO on July 8 and 9, 1979. Randolph Mantooth starred as Abraham Kent. The film's plot differs from the novel. For instance, as foreseen by Gilbert Kent, his brother Abraham dies in a Boston alley but not before reuniting with his son Jared, who is oblivious to his identity. The film's ending also differs from the book, in that Jared and Amanda (now married to an Indian while discouraging war with the Tribes) are reunited briefly before each goes their separate ways.
