= The Kent Family Chronicles =

Historical fiction series by John Jakes

The Kent Family Chronicles (also known as The American Bicentennial Series) is a series of eight novels by John Jakes written for Lyle Engel of Book Creations, Inc., to commemorate the 200th anniversary of the Declaration of Independence of the United States. The books became best sellers, with no novel in the series selling fewer than 3.5 million copies. With The Rebels, The Seekers, and The Furies, Jakes became the first author to have three books on the New York Times best-seller list in a single year, 1975.

The books feature various members of the Kent family, connecting them with historical events at the time of the American Revolution. The first novel begins just before the American Revolution, with Frenchman Phillipe Charboneau, who travels to England and later to the New World, changing his name to Philip Kent along the way and meeting several key figures of the Revolution, including the Marquis de Lafayette, Benjamin Franklin, Samuel Adams, Paul Revere, Joseph Warren, and others. The saga ends some generations later in 1890, with the death of Gideon Kent in The Americans. The series was originally intended to continue until 1976, covering 200 years.

The first two novels in the series were made into telefilms in 1978 and 1979, both starring Andrew Stevens as Philip Kent, with the third adapted as a 1979 telefilm starring Randolph Mantooth as the son, Abraham Kent. "Operation Prime Time" premiered in syndication with the first of these.

== Novels ==
- The Bastard (1974)
- The Rebels (1975)
- The Seekers (1975)
- The Furies (1976)
- The Titans (1976)
- The Warriors (1977)
- The Lawless (1978)
- The Americans (1979)
