= The Bastard (novel) =

1974 historical novel by American writer John Jakes

- First edition
- Author: John Jakes
- Language: English
- Series: The Kent Family Chronicles
- Genre: Historical fiction
- Publication date: 1974
- Publication place: United States
- Media type: Print
- Pages: 544
- ISBN: 0552109444
- Followed by: The Rebels

The Bastard is a historical novel written by John Jakes and originally published in 1974. It is book one in a series known as The Kent Family Chronicles or the American Bicentennial Series. The novel mixes fictional characters with historical events or people to tell the story of the United States of America in the time period leading up to the American Revolution. The novel was adapted into a four-hour television film in 1978, also called The Bastard.

== Plot summary ==
The story begins in November 1770 in Auvergne, France, near Chavaniac. Seventeen-year-old Philippe Charboneau, illegitimate son of James Amberly, the 6th Duke of Kent, travels with his mother, Marie, to Kent, England, to stake their claim to his inheritance. When they arrive, the Duke's family refuses to recognize Philippe as the son of the Duke. During one violent altercation, Philippe badly injures the Duke’s legitimate son, Roger Amberly, effectively crippling his hand. Lacking the funds to return to France, Marie and Philippe flee to London, where Philippe learns the printing trade and makes plans to emigrate to America.

Benjamin Franklin visits the printing shop where Philippe is working and further reinforces his desire to go to America, but Marie, still determined to pursue her son’s inheritance, is against such a trip. However, an armed scoundrel hired by a vengeful Roger Amberly tries to kill Philippe with a pistol, forcing Philippe and Marie to escape to America immediately. During their transatlantic journey, Marie dies of dysentery and is buried at sea, and Philippe decides to adopt an Anglicized version of his name, renaming himself Philip Kent.

Philip arrives in Boston, Massachusetts, penniless, becoming homeless and starving. He is introduced to Benjamin Edes, the editor of the Boston Gazette, who gives Philip a job at his publishing firm. Through this job, Philip meets Abraham Ware, who often contributes to articles to the paper, and his daughter Anne, whom Philip begins courting.

Philip participates in the Boston Tea Party and then joins the Boston Grenadier Company under Henry Knox. A number of measures are enacted after the Tea Party to punish the colonists in Boston. One of these acts, the Quartering Act, particularly angers Abraham Ware, because he is required to house a British soldier in his home. George Lumden, the sergeant who is quartered in the Wares' house, falls in love with Daisy O'Brian, the Wares' cook, and decides to desert the British army. Philip, who wants Lumden's musket, encourages the sergeant to do so and even employs a local boy to assist him in taking the musket. However, the boy betrays Philip and informs on Lumden to the commander of his unit, who is none other than Roger Amberly. Roger goes to the Wares' house in search of Lumden, but finds only Anne. When Philip arrives, Roger recognizes and attacks him. Philip stabs his half-brother in the stomach with a bayonet and flees with Lumden for Daisy's father's farm, near Concord, Massachusetts.

Anne and Daisy join them at the farm some time later and inform him that Roger survived. He was taken to Philadelphia to be treated privately, along with his fiancée Alicia Parkhurst. Philip, who once had an affair with Alicia, leaves Concord to see her in Philadelphia. Roger dies before Philip reaches the city. Philip meets with Alicia, who tells him she wants to marry him, but Philip realizes this is only because he is now the Duke's only heir. Philip informs Alicia that he no longer loves her and has decided to give up any claim to his inheritance.

On his return from Philadelphia to Concord, Philip participates in Paul Revere's "midnight ride" to warn the Patriots that the British army is coming. Philip tries to see Anne, but her father will not allow him to. Philip participates in the Battle of Concord and afterwards is finally reunited with Anne. He tells her that he plans to marry her and then leaves to continue fighting in the war against the British.

== Adaptation ==
Universal Television adapted the novel into a four-hour television film, also called The Bastard. The miniseries was directed by Lee H. Katzin, starred Andrew Stevens as Philippe Charboneau/Philip Kent, and aired on May 22 and 29, 1978, as part of Operation Prime Time.

== See also ==
- List of television series and miniseries about the American Revolution
- List of films about the American Revolution
