= John Jakes =

American writer (1932–2023)

- Born: John William Jakes; March 31, 1932; Chicago, Illinois, U.S.
- Died: March 11, 2023 (aged 90); Sarasota, Florida, U.S.
- Education: DePauw University; Ohio State University (MA)
- Occupation: Writer
- Spouse: Rachel Jakes (m. 1951)
- Children: 4
- Writing career
- Pen name: Jay Scotland
- Period: 1950–2023
- Genres: Historical novels, fantasy, science fiction
- Notable works: The Kent Family Chronicles; North and South trilogy

John William Jakes (March 31, 1932 – March 11, 2023) was an American writer, best known for historical and speculative fiction. His American Civil War trilogy, North and South, has sold millions of copies worldwide. He was also the author of The Kent Family Chronicles. Jakes used the pen name Jay Scotland among others.

== Early life and education ==
Jakes was born in Chicago, Illinois, on March 31, 1932. He first sold stories to pulp magazines while still in college in the early 1950s. Jakes studied creative writing at DePauw University in Greencastle, Indiana, where he was a member of Sigma Alpha Epsilon, graduating in 1953. He then earned an MA in American literature from Ohio State University. He and Rachel, to whom he had been married for 13 months at the time, appeared on the game show Beat the Clock on August 23, 1952. Although they failed to complete the Bonus Round, Rachel won a Sylvania "Jefferson" 20" screen television set. In 1961, Jakes moved to Dayton, Ohio. He lived there for ten years and worked as a copywriter for several advertising agencies while he wrote fiction at night and on the weekends. In 1971, he began to write full-time.

== Writing career ==
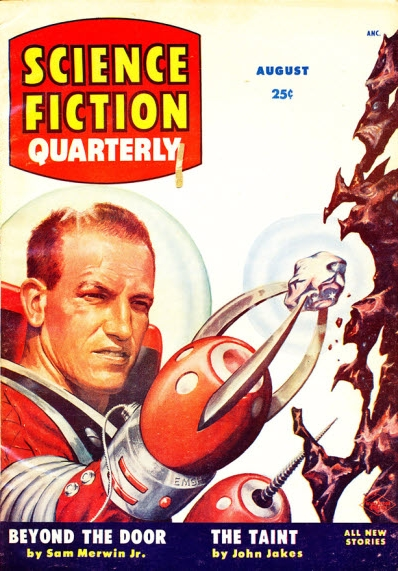
Cover of Science Fiction Quarterly featuring John Jakes's "The Taint"

Thrilling Wonder Stories, edited by Sam Merwin, published two 1949–1950 letters from Jakes and two of his stories were published in pulp magazines edited by Howard Browne late in 1950, The Dreaming Trees (Fantastic Adventures, November) and "Your Number Is Up!" (Amazing Stories, December). Jakes sold his first short story (1,500 words) in 1950.

Twenty-eight more speculative fiction stories by Jakes were published 1951 to 1953. He then published dozens of stories and several novels during the twenty years following completion of college, many of them fantasy fiction, science fiction and westerns, and other sorts of historical fiction.

During this time, he was a member of the Swordsmen and Sorcerers' Guild of America (SAGA), a loose-knit group of heroic fantasy authors founded in the 1960s and led by Lin Carter. The eight original members were self-selected by fantasy credentials alone. They sought to promote the popularity and respectability of the "Sword and Sorcery" subgenre (such as Brak the Barbarian stories by Jakes).

Jakes gained widespread popularity with the publication of his Kent Family Chronicles, which became a bestselling American Bicentennial Series of books in the mid- to late 1970s, selling 55 million copies. He subsequently published several more popular works of historical fiction, most dealing with American history, including the North and South trilogy about the U.S. Civil War, which sold 10 million copies and was adapted as an ABC miniseries.

In 1988, Jakes's stage adaptation of Charles Dickens's A Christmas Carol was first performed at his home theater on Hilton Head Island. It has since become popular for production by many universities and regional theaters, including the Alabama Shakespeare Festival.

In September 2013, Jakes was named a Florida Literary Legend at the Florida Heritage Book Festival and Writers Conference in St. Augustine, Florida.

== Personal life and death ==
Jakes lived on Bird Key in Sarasota, Florida, with his wife, Rachel, to whom he had been married from 1951. They had four grown children: Andrea, Dr. Ellen, J. Michael, and Victoria.

Jakes died in Sarasota on March 11, 2023, at the age of 90.

== Works ==
=== Mainstream novels ===
==== The Kent Family Chronicles ====
- The Bastard (1974) (Film adaptation: The Bastard)
- The Rebels (1975) (Film adaptation: The Rebels)
- The Seekers (1975) (Film adaptation: The Seekers)
- The Furies (1976)
- The Titans (1976)
- The Warriors (1977)
- The Lawless (1978)
- The Americans (1979)

==== The North and South trilogy ====
- North and South (1982) (Film adaption)
- Love and War (1984) (Film adaption)
- Heaven and Hell (1987) (Film adaption)

==== The Crown Family Saga ====
- Homeland (1993)
- American Dreams (1998)

==== Other ====
- The Texans Ride North (1952)
- A Night For Treason (1956)
- Wear A Fast Gun (1956)
- The Devil Has Four Faces (1958)
- The Seventh Man (1958)
- I, Barbarian (1959) (as Jay Scotland)
- Johnny Havoc (1960)
- Sir Scoundrel (1962) (as Jay Scotland)
- Veils of Salome (1962)
- Arena (1963) (as Jay Scotland)
- Making It Big aka Johnny Havoc and the Siren in Red (1968)
- On Wheels (1973)
- California Gold (1989)
- In The Big Country (1993), later reissued as The Bold Frontier (2001)
- On Secret Service (2000)
- Charleston (2002)
- Savannah or a Gift for Mr. Lincoln (2004)
- Funeral for Tanner Moody (with Elmer Kelton, Robert Randish) (2004)
- The Gods of Newport (2006)

=== Science fiction and fantasy ===
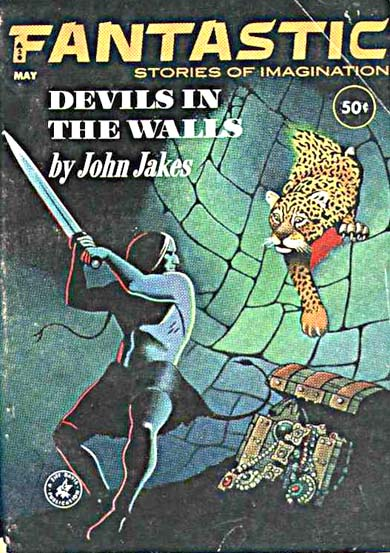
The first Brak story, "Devils in the Walls", was originally published in Fantastic in 1962. It was collected in The Fortunes of Brak.

==== Brak the Barbarian ====
- Brak the Barbarian (1968)
- Brak the Barbarian Versus the Sorceress (also published as "Witch of the Four Winds"(1969)
- Brak the Barbarian Versus the Mark of the Demons (1969)
- When the Idols Walked (1978) ISBN 0-671-81373-0
- The Fortunes of Brak (1980)
- Brak the Barbarian / Mark of the Demons (omnibus) (2012)
- Witch of the Four Winds / When the Idols Walked (omnibus) (2012)

==== Dark Gate ====
- Master of the Dark Gate (1970)
- Witch of the Dark Gate (1972)

==== Dragonard ====
- When The Star Kings Die (1967)
- The Planet Wizard (1969)
- Tonight We Steal the Stars (1969)

==== Planet of the Apes ====
- Conquest of the Planet of the Apes (1972)

==== Other novels ====
- Secrets Of Stardeep (1969)
- The Hybrid (1969)
- The Last Magicians (1969)
- The Asylum World (1969)
- Mask of Chaos (1970)
- Monte Cristo #99 (1970)
- Six-Gun Planet (1970)
- Black in Time (1970)
- Time Gate (1972)
- Mention My Name in Atlantis (1972)
- On Wheels (1973)
- Excalibur (1980) with Gil Kane

==== Collections ====
- The Best of John Jakes (1977)

=== Children's books ===
- Susanna of the Alamo (1986)

=== Nonfiction ===
- Famous Firsts in Sports (1967)
- Great War Correspondents (1967)
- Great Women Reporters (1969)
- Mohawk: The Life Of Joseph Brant (1969)

=== Plays ===
- A Christmas Carol (1988)

== Adaptations ==
The Bastard was adapted as a television miniseries by Universal Television as the first offering of the highly successful syndicated package, Operation Prime Time (1978). It was followed by The Rebels (1979) and The Seekers (1979). The North and South trilogy was made into three miniseries on ABC in the 1980s and 1990s.
