= The Rebels (Jakes novel) =

1975 novel by John Jakes

- First edition
- Author: John Jakes
- Language: English
- Series: The Kent Family Chronicles
- Genre: Historical fiction
- Publication date: 1975
- Publication place: United States
- Media type: Print
- Pages: 432
- ISBN: 0515092061
- Preceded by: The Bastard
- Followed by: The Seekers

The Rebels is a historical novel written by John Jakes, originally published in 1975, the second in a series known as The Kent Family Chronicles or the American Bicentennial Series. The novel mixes fictional characters with historical events and figures, to narrate the story of the nascent United States of America during the time of the American Revolution. While the novel continues the story of Philip Kent, started in The Bastard, a large portion focuses on Judson Fletcher, a newly introduced character, as a different rebel. In 1979, the novel was made into a television film by Operation Prime Time.

== Plot summary ==
Judson Fletcher, a drunkard and a womanizer, lives with his father on Sermon Hill, a large tobacco plantation on the Rappahannock River in northern Virginia. Fletcher romantically pursues Peggy Ashford McLean, the wife of his friend Seth McLean. During a great rebellion of slaves, Peggy is raped and Seth is killed. When Judson defends the slaves, his father Angus Fletcher puts his son out of the house.

Judson attends the Second Continental Congress as a delegate and begins an affair with Alicia Parkhurst. Tobias Trumbull, Alicia's uncle, tries to take her home. When Judson objects, Trumbull challenges him to a duel. The day before the duel, during a debate on the Lee Resolution, Judson is dismissed from the Virginia delegation for drunkenness and therefore misses his chance to vote on the historic resolution. The next day, Judson kills Trumbull in the duel and Alicia commits suicide by drowning. Judson returns to Virginia and lives with Lottie Shaw at a place once owned by her late husband. One day, in a drunken rage, he expels her from her own property. Soon after, he visits Peggy McLean, by now a widow, and rapes her; unbeknownst to him, this encounter would produce a daughter, Elizabeth.

Judson rides to meet his childhood friend George Rogers Clark, who is in town recruiting men for a military expedition to the Northwest Territory. Judson enlists with him, but upon his return home, Lottie shoots him and leaves him for dead. Judson recovers and sets off for Pittsburgh in hopes of meeting Clark. Clark refuses to include him in his detachment, citing his alcoholism. On returning to his boat, Clark catches a spy in the act of stealing his orders. After a scuffle, the spy shoots at Clark, but Judson takes the bullet and is mortally wounded.

Parallel to this story, the novel continues the adventures of Philip Kent, the main character in the previous novel, as he participates in various notable events of the American Revolutionary War. These include the Battle of Bunker Hill, Henry Knox's mission to transport cannons from Fort Ticonderoga, the Battle of Brandywine, and the Battle of Monmouth, where he is wounded in the leg and mustered out of the army. He receives a letter informing him that his wife has died, leaving him a substantial inheritance. Kent uses the money to begin a publishing firm, Kent and Son. Almost a year later, Kent's friend, the Marquis de Lafayette, introduces Kent to Peggy McLean, who becomes his second wife.

== Adaptation ==
In 1979, the novel was made into a television film by Operation Prime Time. Don Johnson starred as Judson Fletcher and Andrew Stevens reprised his role as Philip Kent.

== See also ==
- List of television series and miniseries about the American Revolution
- List of films about the American Revolution
