= The Last Challenge =

1967 film by Richard Thorpe

- Original film poster
- Directed by: Richard Thorpe
- Written by: Robert Emmett Ginna Jr., John Sherry
- Based on: Pistolero's Progress by John Sherry
- Produced by: Richard Thorpe
- Starring: Glenn Ford; Angie Dickinson
- Cinematography: Ellsworth Fredricks
- Edited by: Richard W. Farrell
- Music by: Richard Shores
- Color process: Metrocolor
- Production company: Metro-Goldwyn-Mayer
- Distributed by: Metro-Goldwyn-Mayer
- Release date: December 27, 1967
- Running time: 96 minutes
- Country: United States
- Language: English

The Last Challenge is a 1967 American Western in Panavision, produced and directed by Richard Thorpe (marking his final film). The film starred Glenn Ford and Angie Dickinson and centered around a town sheriff contending with his reputation as the "fastest gun in the West". It is also known under the titles of Pistolero and The Pistolero of Red River.

The Last Challenge was adapted from Pistolero's Progress, a novel by John Sherry (John Olden Sherry) and published by Pocket Books in 1966. It is widely and falsely reported that the screenplay for The Last Challenge was written by Albert Maltz, the blacklisted writer. The confusion is due to Maltz' use of the pseudonym John B. Sherry.

Peter Ford in his biography of his father Glenn Ford: A Life noted, "Oddly the picture Dad made after The Last Challenge, called Day of the Evil Gun, was directed by Jerry Thorpe, Richard's son. This must be the only case in film history where the same star made back-to-back movies directed first by a father and then by his son."

== Plot ==
A cocky young man from Tennessee, Lot McGuire, seeks to back up his notion that he's the fastest gun there is. "If a man is second best, he might as well be dead," says McGuire. He travels to a town with the intention of forcing a duel with Marshal Dan Blaine, who's renowned for his skill with a gun.

McGuire happens upon a man fishing, but does not know it is Blaine. They enjoy each other's company, but when McGuire tells Blaine of his desire to have a gunfight with Blaine, Blaine makes himself known. When McGuire finds out that it is Blaine he is speaking to, he moves on, not wanting to get too friendly with the man he intends to kill.

Brothel owner Lisa Denton loves Blaine, has marriage in mind and will do anything to ensure that happens. She hires a down-and-out drifter, Scarnes, to kill McGuire. Scarnes and Blaine did time together in prison for a bank robbery many years ago, after which Blaine decided to do something good with his life, and became a lawman.

In the next several days, Blaine and McGuire have several conversations. They even work together to help bring in a group of Indians who are disorderly. Blaine discerns that McGuire is not really a bad man, and he tells McGuire that he does not believe that he (McGuire) is a real killer, but is in the gunfighting line of work just to become known. Blaine tries to tell McGuire to not go through with taking him on, because he will have to shoot him, since if he doesn't, he believes it will cause unlawful men to come to town, thinking that either Blaine is vulnerable or else has lost his heart or nerve for taking on bad men.

Outside of town, Scarnes ambushes McGuire and kills his horse, but during a shootout is gut-shot. McGuire finds out from a dying Scarnes that Lisa hired him. Lisa tells of her love for Blaine and asks McGuire to leave town. He refuses.

Knowing a showdown is coming, Lisa gets out her Derringer pistol and prepares to kill McGuire, but a disgusted Blaine finds her and takes the gun from her. The two men meet at the bar and the showdown occurs there rather than in the street. McGuire draws his revolver (which is worn in a reverse fashion) first and fires. Blaine shoots him in the chest. A stunned McGuire dies, eyes open and speechless.

Blaine notices he has been shot in the side, but it is not fatal. The next day as McGuire's casket is being lowered into the ground, Blaine removes his gun and holster and throws them into the grave. He rides out of town without a gun, as Lisa watches from the saloon steps, crying.

== Cast ==
- Glenn Ford as Marshal Dan Blaine
- Angie Dickinson as Lisa Denton
- Chad Everett as 'Lot' McGuire
- Gary Merrill as Squint Calloway
- Jack Elam as Ernest Scarnes
- Delphi Lawrence as Marie Webster
- Royal Dano as Pretty Horse
- Kevin Hagen as Frank Garrison
- Florence Sundstrom as Outdoors
- Marian Collier as Sadie
- Robert Sorrells as Deputy Harry Bell
- John Milford as Billy Turpin
- Frank McGrath as Ballard Weeks
- Len Lesser as Ed, the Bartender (uncredited)

== Reception ==
Howard Thompson of The New York Times in an unsigned review while complimentary about the cast wrote that the screenplay was "lean and uncluttered", and concluded it was "a small picture -- small, painless and pointless".

== See also ==
- List of American films of 1967
