= Glenn Ford =

American actor (1916–2006)

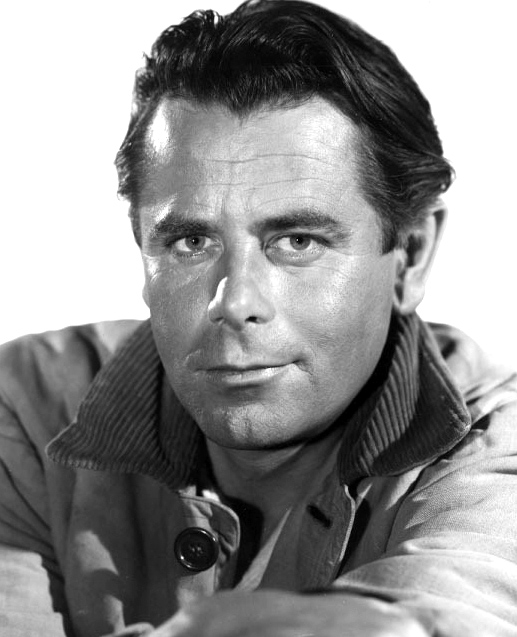
- Ford in 1955
- Born: Gwyllyn Samuel Newton Ford; May 1, 1916; Sainte-Christine-d'Auvergne, Quebec, Canada
- Died: August 30, 2006 (aged 90); Beverly Hills, California, U.S.
- Resting place: Woodlawn Memorial Cemetery, Santa Monica, California, U.S.
- Citizenship: British subject (until 1939); United States (after 1939)
- Occupation: Actor
- Years active: 1937–1991
- Spouses: Eleanor Powell (m. 1943; div. 1959) Kathryn Hays (m. 1966; div. 1969) Cynthia Hayward (m. 1977; div. 1984) Jeanne Baus (m. 1993; div. 1994)
- Children: Peter Ford
- Relatives: John A. Macdonald (great-uncle)

Gwyllyn Samuel Newton Ford (May 1, 1916 – August 30, 2006), known as Glenn Ford, was a Canadian-born American actor. He was most prominent during Hollywood's Golden Age as one of the biggest box-office draws of the 1940s, 1950s, and 1960s, and had a career that lasted more than 50 years.

Ford often portrayed ordinary men in unusual circumstances. Although he starred in many genres of film, some of his most significant roles were in the films noir Gilda (1946) and The Big Heat (1953), and the high-school drama Blackboard Jungle (1955). For comedies and Westerns, though, he received acting laurels, including three Golden Globe Award nominations for Best Actor – Motion Picture Musical or Comedy, winning for Pocketful of Miracles (1961). He also played a supporting role as Superman's mild-mannered alter ego Clark Kent's adoptive farmer father, Jonathan Kent, in the first film of the franchise series Superman (1978).

Five of his films have been selected for the National Film Registry by the Library of Congress as being "culturally, historically or aesthetically" significant: Gilda (1946), The Big Heat (1953), Blackboard Jungle (1955), 3:10 to Yuma (1957), and Superman (1978).

== Early life ==
Gwyllyn Samuel Newton Ford was born on May 1, 1916, in Sainte-Christine-d'Auvergne, Quebec, Canada the son of Hannah Wood Ford (née Mitchell) and Newton Ford, an engineer with the Canadian Pacific Railway. In 1922, when Ford was aged six, the family emigrated southwest across the border into the United States, first to Venice, California, and then to Santa Monica, west of Los Angeles; his father became a motorman on a tram/streetcar for the Venice Electric Tram Company, a job he held until he died at age 50 in 1940, when his son Glenn was 24.

While attending Santa Monica High School, Glen was active in school drama productions with other future actors, such as James Griffith. After graduation around 1934, he began working in small theatre groups. While in high school, he took odd jobs, including working for comedian and entertainer Will Rogers, who taught him horsemanship. Ford later commented that his father had no objection to his growing interest in acting, but told him, "It's all right for you to try to act, if you learn something else first. Be able to take a car apart and put it together. Be able to build a house, every bit of it. Then you'll always have something." Ford heeded the paternal advice and decades later during the 1950s, when he was one of Hollywood's most popular actors, he regularly worked on plumbing, wiring, and air conditioning at his home.

At age 23, Ford gave up his status as a subject of the King (Canadian citizenship) and became a naturalized citizen of the United States on November 10, 1939, taking the oath of allegiance.

== Early career ==
=== Columbia Pictures ===
Ford acted in West Coast stage companies and had a role in the short Night in Manhattan (1937) before joining Columbia Pictures in 1939. His stage name came from his father's hometown of Glenford, Alberta.

His first major movie part was in Heaven with a Barbed Wire Fence (1939) at 20th Century Fox studios, written by Dalton Trumbo. Ford's first movie for Columbia was a "B", My Son Is Guilty (1939). He went on to other "B" movies, such as Convicted Woman (1940), Men Without Souls (1940), Babies for Sale (1940), and Blondie Plays Cupid (1941).

Ford was in the bigger-budgeted The Lady in Question (1940), which co-starred Rita Hayworth. This was a well-received courtroom drama in which Ford plays a young man who falls in love with Rita Hayworth when his father, Brian Aherne, tries to rehabilitate her in their bicycle shop. Directed by Hungarian emigre Charles Vidor, the two rising young stars instantly bonded.

=== So Ends Our Night ===
Top Hollywood director John Cromwell was impressed enough with Ford's work to borrow him from Columbia for the independently produced drama So Ends Our Night (1941), where Ford delivered a poignant portrayal of a 19-year-old German exile on the run in Nazi-occupied Europe.

Working with Academy Award-winning Fredric March and wooing (onscreen) 30-year-old Margaret Sullavan, (who had been nominated for an Academy Award for 1938's Three Comrades), Ford's portrayal of a shy, ardent young refugee riveted attention even in such stellar company. "Glenn Ford, a most promising newcomer", wrote The New York Times's Bosley Crowther in a review on February 28, 1941, "draws more substance and appealing simplicity from his role of the boy than anyone else in the cast."

After the film's highly publicized premiere in Los Angeles and a gala fundraiser in Miami, President Franklin D. Roosevelt saw the film in a private screening at the White House and admired the film greatly. Young Ford was invited to Roosevelt's annual Birthday Ball. Inspired and enthused by the President, he returned to Los Angeles and promptly registered as a Democrat and a fervent FDR supporter. "I was so impressed when I met Franklin and Eleanor Roosevelt", recalled Glenn Ford to his son decades later, "I was thrilled when I got back to Los Angeles and found a beautiful photograph personally autographed to me. It always held a place of high honor in my home."

His next picture, Texas, was his first Western, a genre with which he would be associated for the rest of his life. Set after the American Civil War, it paired him with another young male star also under contract, William Holden, who became a lifelong friend. More routine films followed, and Ford made enough to allow him to buy his mother and himself a new home in the Pacific Palisades community.

So Ends Our Night also affected the young star in another way; in the summer of 1941, while the United States was still neutral in the Second World War, he enlisted in the United States Coast Guard Auxiliary, though he had a class 3 deferment (for being his mother's sole support). He began his training in September 1941, driving three nights a week to his waterfront unit in San Pedro and spending most weekends there.

He continued to appear in movies for Columbia such as Go West, Young Lady (1941) and The Adventures of Martin Eden (1942).

=== World War II and Eleanor Powell ===
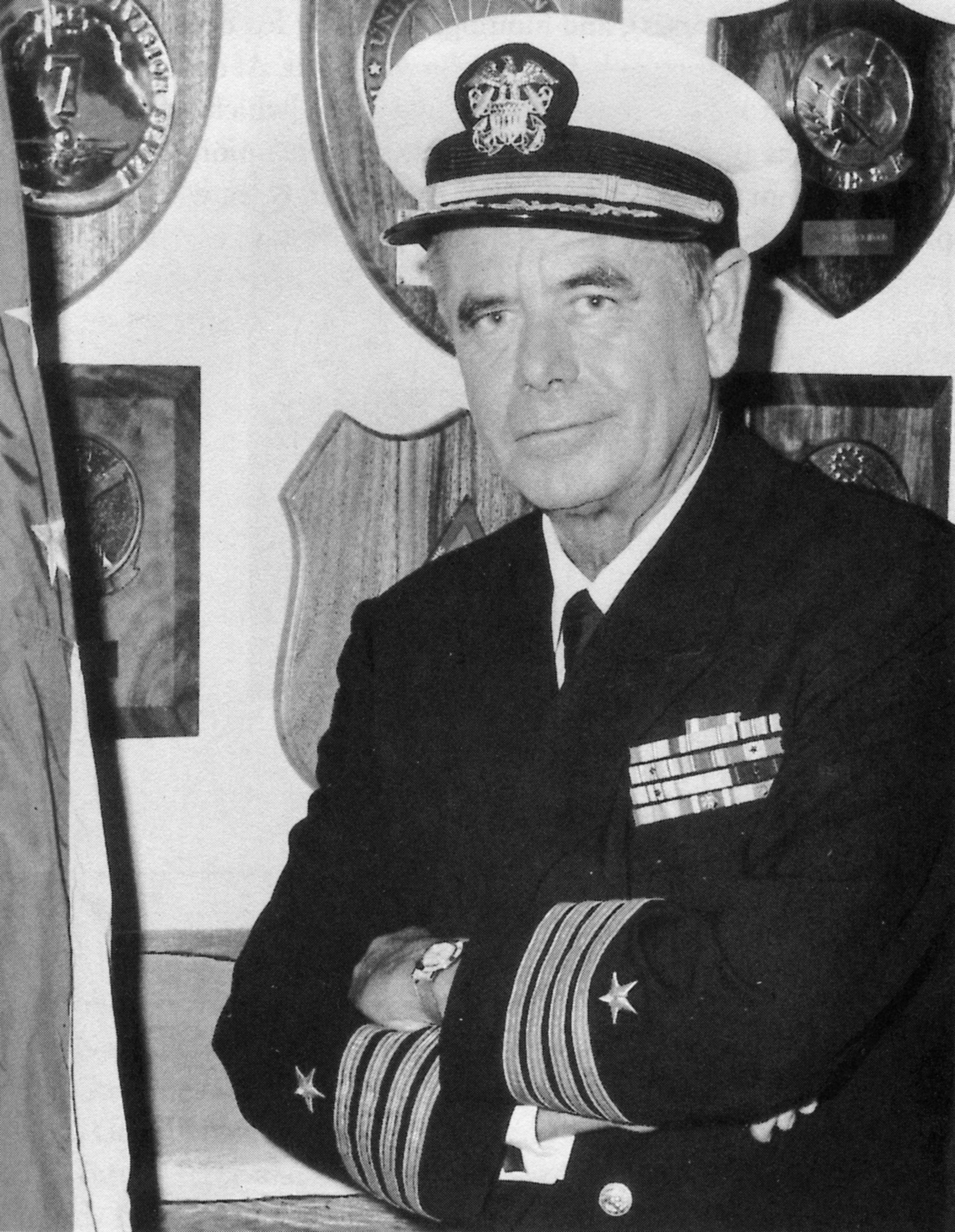
Captain Glenn Ford, United States Naval Reserve

Ten months after Ford's portrait of a young anti-Nazi exile, the United States entered World War II with the Imperial Japanese surprise attack on Pearl Harbor naval and air bases in Hawaii. After playing a young pilot in his 11th Columbia film, Flight Lieutenant (1942), Ford went on a cross-country, 12-city tour to sell war bonds for Army and Navy Relief. In the midst of the many stars also donating their time – from Bob Hope to Cary Grant to Claudette Colbert – he met popular dancing star Eleanor Powell. The two soon fell in love; they attended the official opening of the Hollywood USO canteen together in October.

Ford made The Desperadoes (1942), another Western. Then, while making another war drama, Destroyer with ardent antifascist Edward G. Robinson, Ford impulsively volunteered for the United States Marine Corps Reserve on December 13, 1942. The startled studio had to beg the Marines to give their second male lead four more weeks to complete shooting on their picture. In the meantime, Ford proposed to Eleanor Powell, who subsequently announced her retirement from the screen to be near her fiancé as he started Marine Corps boot camp.

Ford recalled later to his son that his friend William Holden, who had joined the United States Army Air Corps, and Ford had "talked about it and we were both convinced that our careers, which were just getting established, would likely be forgotten by the time we got back ... if we got back." He was assigned in March 1943 to active duty at the Marine Corps Base in San Diego. With his Coast Guard service, he was offered a position as a Marine Corps officer, but Ford declined, feeling it would be interpreted as preferential treatment for a movie star, and instead entered the Marines as a private. He trained at the Marine base in San Diego where Tyrone Power, the number-one male movie star at the time, was also based. Power suggested Ford join him in the Marines' weekly radio show Halls of Montezuma, broadcast Sunday evenings from San Diego. Ford excelled in training, winning the Rifle Marksman Badge, being named "Honor Man" of the platoon, and being promoted to sergeant by the time he finished.

Awaiting assignment at Camp Pendleton Marine Corps base, Ford volunteered to play a Marine raider – uncredited – in the film Guadalcanal Diary, made by Fox, with Ford and others charging up the beaches of Southern California. He later showed this to his little boy Peter, along with his many other black-and-white battle scenes in other films. Frustratingly for Ford, filming battle scenes was the closest he would ever get to any enemy action. After being sent to Marine Corps Schools Detachment (Photographic Section) in Quantico, Virginia, three months later, Ford returned to the San Diego base in February 1944 and was assigned to the radio section of the Public Relations Office, Headquarters Company, Base Headquarters Battalion, where he resumed work on the Halls of Montezuma film.

Just as Eleanor, now his wife, was expecting the birth of their child and Ford himself was looking forward to Officers Training School, he was hospitalized at the U.S. Naval Hospital in San Diego with what turned out to be duodenal ulcers, which afflicted him for the rest of his life. He was in and out of the hospital for the next five months and finally received a medical discharge on the third anniversary of Pearl Harbor, December 7, 1944. Though without the combat duty for which he had been hoping, Ford was awarded several service medals for his three years in the Marines Reserve Corps: the American Campaign Medal, the Asiatic-Pacific Campaign Medal, and the World War II Victory Medal, created in 1945 for anyone who had been on active duty since December 1941. After the war, Ford continued his military career in the Naval Reserve well into the Vietnam War era, reaching the rank of captain.

=== Gilda ===
The most memorable role of Ford's early career came with his first postwar film in 1946, starring alongside Rita Hayworth in Gilda. This was Glenn Ford's second pairing with Hayworth; like the first, it was directed by Charles Vidor.

The New York Times movie reviewer Bosley Crowther did not much like, or as he freely admitted, even understand the movie, but he noted that Ford had "just returned from war duty" and did show "a certain stamina and poise in the role of a tough young gambler."

Reviewing the film in 1946, Crowther did not yet have the phrase with which Gilda would soon be associated, a term that French critics had not even invented in 1946: film noir. The erotic sadism and covert homoeroticism were actively encouraged on set by director Vidor, a sophisticated Budapest-born expatriate, though Glenn Ford always denied any awareness of the latter in his character's fervent loyalty to his boss, who had unwittingly married the love of Johnny's life.

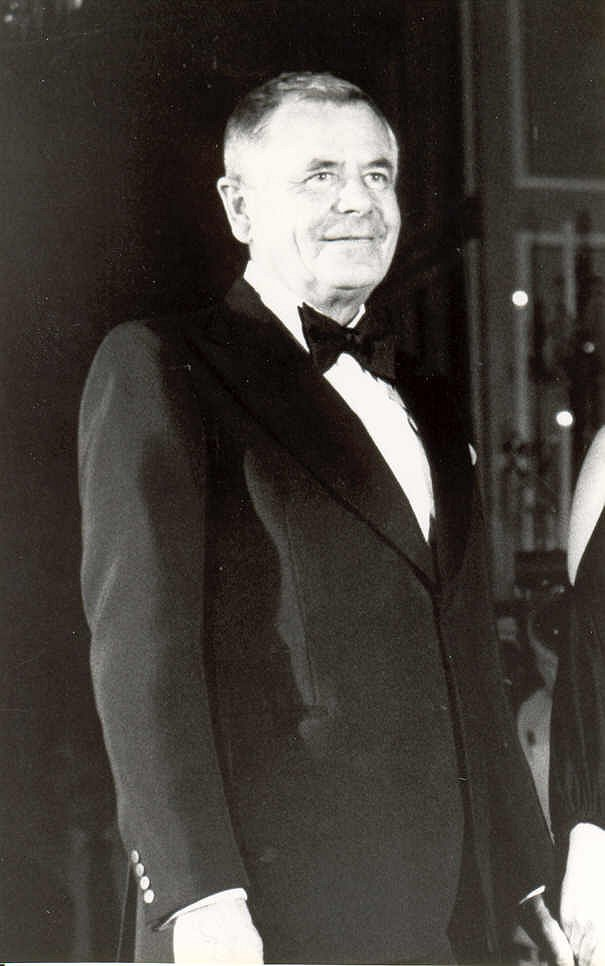
Ford at age 63 at the National Film Society convention in 1979

The film was entered in the Cannes Film Festival in France, then in its first year. Ford went on to be a leading man opposite Hayworth in a total of five films. and after their location romance (his marriage survived, hers did not), the two became lifelong friends and next-door neighbors, and lovers. Beautifully shot in black-and-white by cinematographer Rudolph Mate, Gilda has endured as a classic of film noir. It has a 96% rating on Rotten Tomatoes, and, in 2013, was selected for preservation in the United States National Film Registry by the Library of Congress as being "culturally, historically, or aesthetically significant".

=== Leading star ===
Now established as a star of "A" movies, Ford was borrowed by Warner Bros. studios to play Bette Davis' leading man in A Stolen Life (1946). Back at Columbia, he was in Gallant Journey (1946), a biopic of John Joseph Montgomery; then, he did a thriller, Framed (1947), and a comedy, The Mating of Millie (1948). Hayworth and he were reunited with Vidor in the expensive color filming of the drama, The Loves of Carmen (1948).

Ford appeared in a comedy, The Return of October (1948) and a popular Western The Man from Colorado (1948). The latter co-starred William Holden. Both Ford and his friend William Holden flourished throughout the 1950s and 1960s, but Ford was frustrated that he was not given the opportunity to work with directors of the caliber that Holden did in his Oscar-winning career, such as Billy Wilder and David Lean. He missed out on From Here to Eternity – as did Rita Hayworth – when production was stalled by Columbia studio head Harry Cohn. He also made the mistake, which he bitterly regretted later, of turning down the lead in the brilliant comedy Born Yesterday (also planned with Rita Hayworth), which Holden then snatched up.

Columbia kept Ford constantly busy: The Undercover Man (1949), a film noir; Lust for Gold (1949), a Western with Ida Lupino; and Mr. Soft Touch (1949), with Evelyn Keyes – another crime mystery film noir. MGM borrowed him for The Doctor and the Girl (1950), and he went over to RKO Studios for The White Tower (1950). Back at Columbia, Ford did Convicted (1950) with Broderick Crawford and The Flying Missile, a Cold War-era movie.

== Freelance star ==
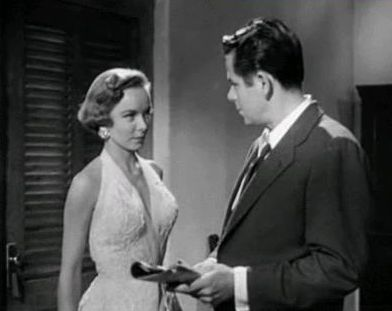
Diana Lynn and Glenn Ford in Plunder of the Sun, 1953

Ford went to Paramount for The Redhead and the Cowboy (1951) and Fox for Follow the Sun (1951), where he played Ben Hogan, and the Western The Secret of Convict Lake (1951). At United Artists, he starred in The Green Glove (1952), then MGM called him back for Young Man with Ideas (1952).

Ford was reunited with Rita Hayworth a third time in Affair in Trinidad (1952). He went to Britain to star in MGM's Time Bomb (1953), then to Universal for the Western The Man from the Alamo (1953).

Ford made Plunder of the Sun (1953) with John Farrow, then was cast in the lead of The Big Heat (1953), Fritz Lang's classic crime melodrama with Gloria Grahame, at Columbia. After Appointment in Honduras (1953) at RKO, Ford reunited with Lang and Grahame in Human Desire (1954). Ford did two Westerns, The Americano (1955) at RKO and The Violent Men (1955) at Columbia.

== MGM ==
=== Blackboard Jungle ===
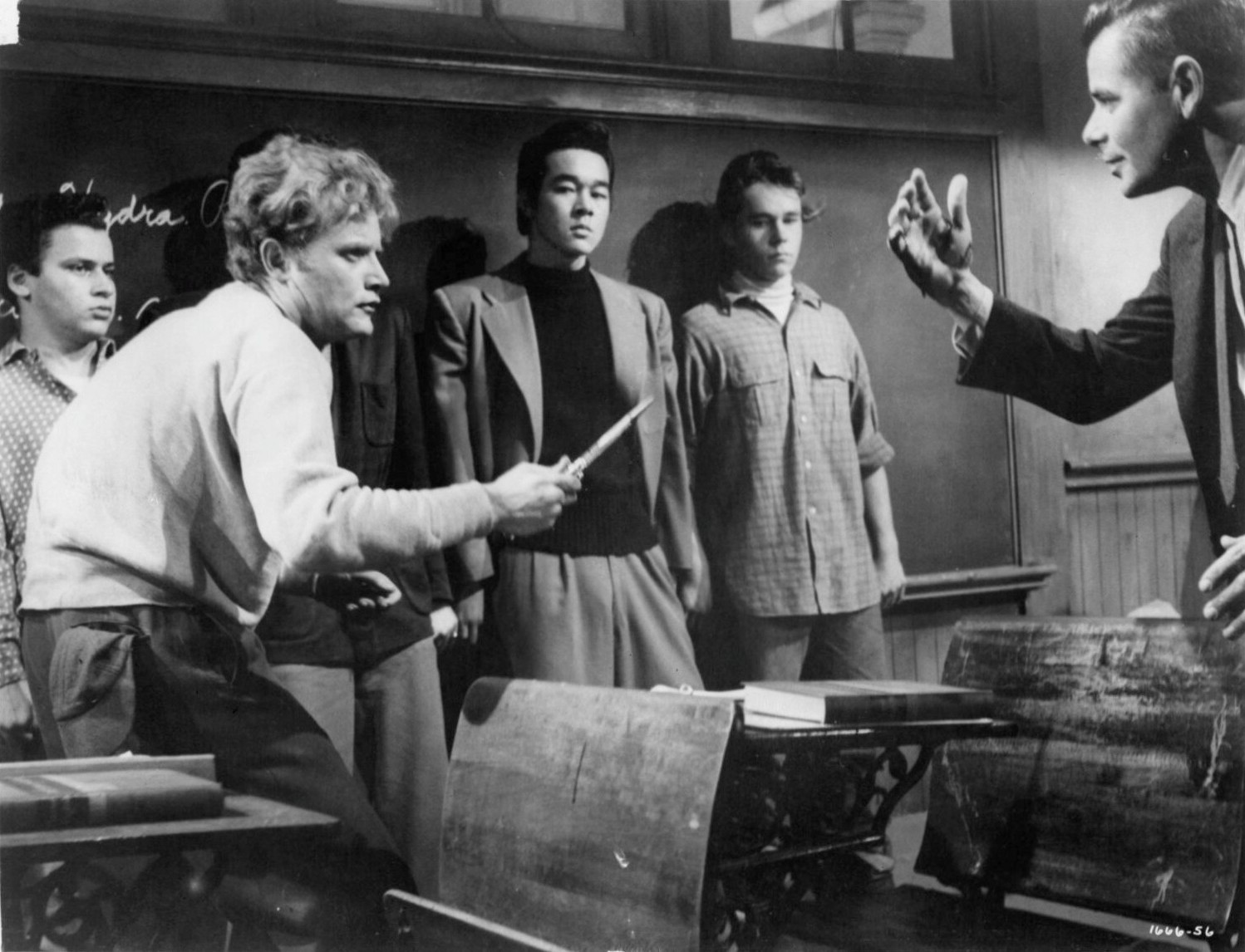
Ford and Vic Morrow in Blackboard Jungle (1955)

Ford's career went up another notch when cast in the lead of Blackboard Jungle (1955), a landmark film of teen angst at MGM. Unlike the comparatively white-bread Rebel Without a Cause and The Wild One, Blackboard Jungle tackled racial conflicts head-on. Ford played an idealistic, harassed teacher at an urban high school that included a very young Sidney Poitier and other black and Hispanic cast members. Vic Morrow played a dangerous juvenile delinquent. Bill Haley's "Rock Around the Clock" under the opening credits was the first use of a rock 'n' roll song in a Hollywood film. Richard Brooks, the film's writer and director, had discovered the music when he heard Ford's son Peter playing the record at Glenn Ford's home.

The movie was a huge hit and MGM signed Ford to a long-term contract. They put him in Interrupted Melody (1955), a biopic of Marjorie Lawrence with Eleanor Parker, and another big success; so, too, were the dramas Trial (1956) and Ransom! (1956). Ford returned to Columbia for the Western Jubal (1956), then back at MGM made another Western, the hugely popular The Fastest Gun Alive (1956).

=== Comedy ===
Ford's versatility allowed him to star in a number of popular comedies, often as a beleaguered, well-meaning but nonplussed straight man facing difficult circumstances. In The Teahouse of the August Moon (1956), he played an American soldier who is sent to Okinawa to convert the occupied island's natives to the American way of life, but is instead converted by them.

All of Ford's starring vehicles in this era became hits: the Columbia Western 3:10 to Yuma (1957), the MGM military comedy Don't Go Near the Water (1957), and Cowboy (1958) with Jack Lemmon at Columbia.

Ford first worked with director George Marshall in The Sheepman (1958), a popular MGM Western. They reteamed for the service comedy Imitation General (1958) and the war film Torpedo Run (1958). Marshall and he made two comedies with Debbie Reynolds: It Started with a Kiss (1959) and The Gazebo (1959). At the end of the 1950s, Ford was among the greatest stars in Hollywood.

== 1960s ==
Ford's first financial flop since he had reached star status was the epic Western Cimarron (1960). He appeared in some comedies, including Cry for Happy (1961) with Marshall and Pocketful of Miracles (1961) with Frank Capra, but neither was as well-received as were his comedies from the previous decade. Ford was cast in the lead of The Four Horsemen of the Apocalypse (1961), a notorious box-office fiasco.

Ford's box-office standing recovered with the thriller Experiment in Terror (1962) and the comedy The Courtship of Eddie's Father (1963). Less popular were the comedies Love Is a Ball (1963) and Advance to the Rear (1964), the latter directed by Marshall. He was in the drama Fate Is the Hunter (1964) and the romantic comedy Dear Heart (1964).

Ford made two films with Burt Kennedy, The Rounders (1965) and The Money Trap (1965). He was one of many famous faces in Is Paris Burning? (1966) and went to Mexico for Rage (1966).

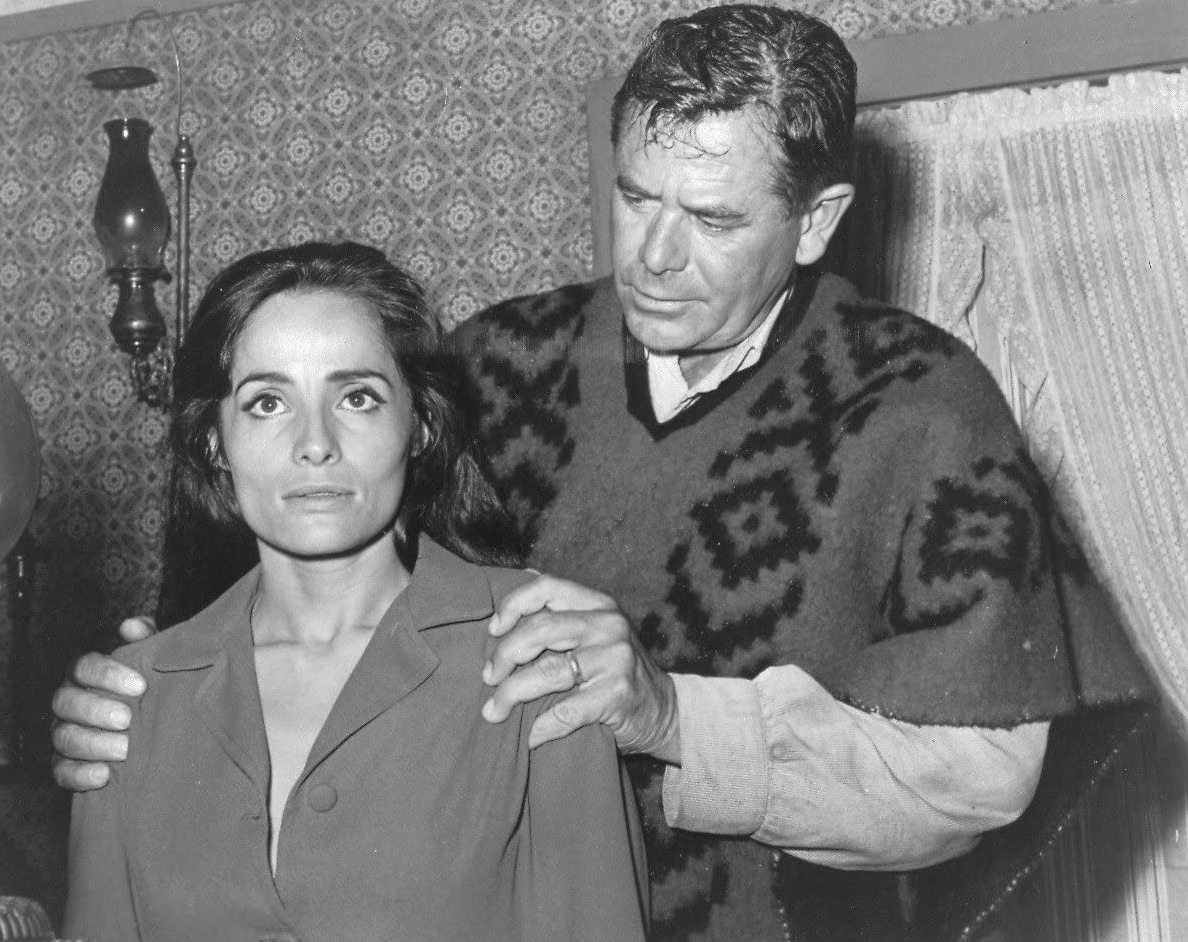
Ford along with Pilar Pellicer in 1968

Ford was in some Westerns: A Time for Killing (1967), The Last Challenge (1967), Day of the Evil Gun (1968), Smith! (1968), and Heaven with a Gun (1969).

== Later career ==
In 1976, Ford played Rear Admiral Raymond Spruance in the epic Midway alongside Henry Fonda, who portrayed Admiral Chester Nimitz, and Charlton Heston, who played the fictional captain Matt Garth. In 1978, Ford had a supporting role in Superman as Clark Kent's adoptive father Jonathan Kent.

=== Later military service ===
Following his abbreviated World War II-era service, Ford returned to the military in 1958. He received a direct commission as a lieutenant commander in the United States Naval Reserve (a nominally junior yet relatively high rank that took Ford's Hollywood imprimatur into consideration, given his conspicuous lack of an undergraduate degree amid the contemporaneous Cold War-era emphasis on education in the officer ranks of United States Armed Forces) and was initially assigned as a public affairs officer (the same role held by his character in the successful comedy Don't Go Near the Water). During his annual training tours, he promoted the Navy through radio and television broadcasts, personal appearances, and documentary films.

Ford continued to combine his film career with his military service, and was promoted to commander in 1963. He was again promoted to captain in 1968 after visiting South Vietnam in 1967 for a month's tour of duty as a location scout for combat scenes in a training film entitled Global Marine. In support of President Lyndon Johnson's escalation of the Vietnam War, he traveled with a combat camera crew from the Vietnamese Demilitarized Zone south to the Mekong Delta. For his service in Vietnam, the Navy awarded him a Navy Commendation Medal. He retired from the Naval Reserve in the 1970s at the rank of captain. Additionally, he was awarded the Armed Forces Reserve Medal, which recognizes those who complete 10 years of honorable reserve service, in 1968.

=== Television ===
In 1971, Ford signed with CBS to star in his first television series, a half-hour comedy/drama titled The Glenn Ford Show. However, CBS head Fred Silverman suggested a Western series, instead, which resulted in the series Cade's County. Ford played southwestern Sheriff Cade for one season (1971–1972) in a mix of police mystery and Western drama.

In The Family Holvak (1975–1976), Ford portrayed a Depression-era preacher in a family drama, reprising the same character he had played in the TV film The Greatest Gift. In 1978, Ford was host, presenter, and narrator of the disaster documentary series When Havoc Struck for the Mobil Showcase Network. In 1981, Ford costarred with Melissa Sue Anderson in the slasher film Happy Birthday to Me.

In 1991, Ford agreed to star in the cable network series African Skies. However, prior to the start of the series, he developed blood clots in his legs that required a lengthy stay at Cedars-Sinai Medical Center. Eventually he recovered, but at one time, his situation was so severe that he was listed in critical condition. Ford was forced to withdraw from the series and was replaced by Robert Mitchum.

=== Radio ===
In 1950, Ford played the title role in The Adventures of Christopher London, created by Erle Stanley Gardner and directed by William N. Robson. London was a private investigator in the weekly adventure series, which ran on Sundays at 7:00 pm on the NBC radio network from January 22 to April 30, 1950.

== Personal life ==
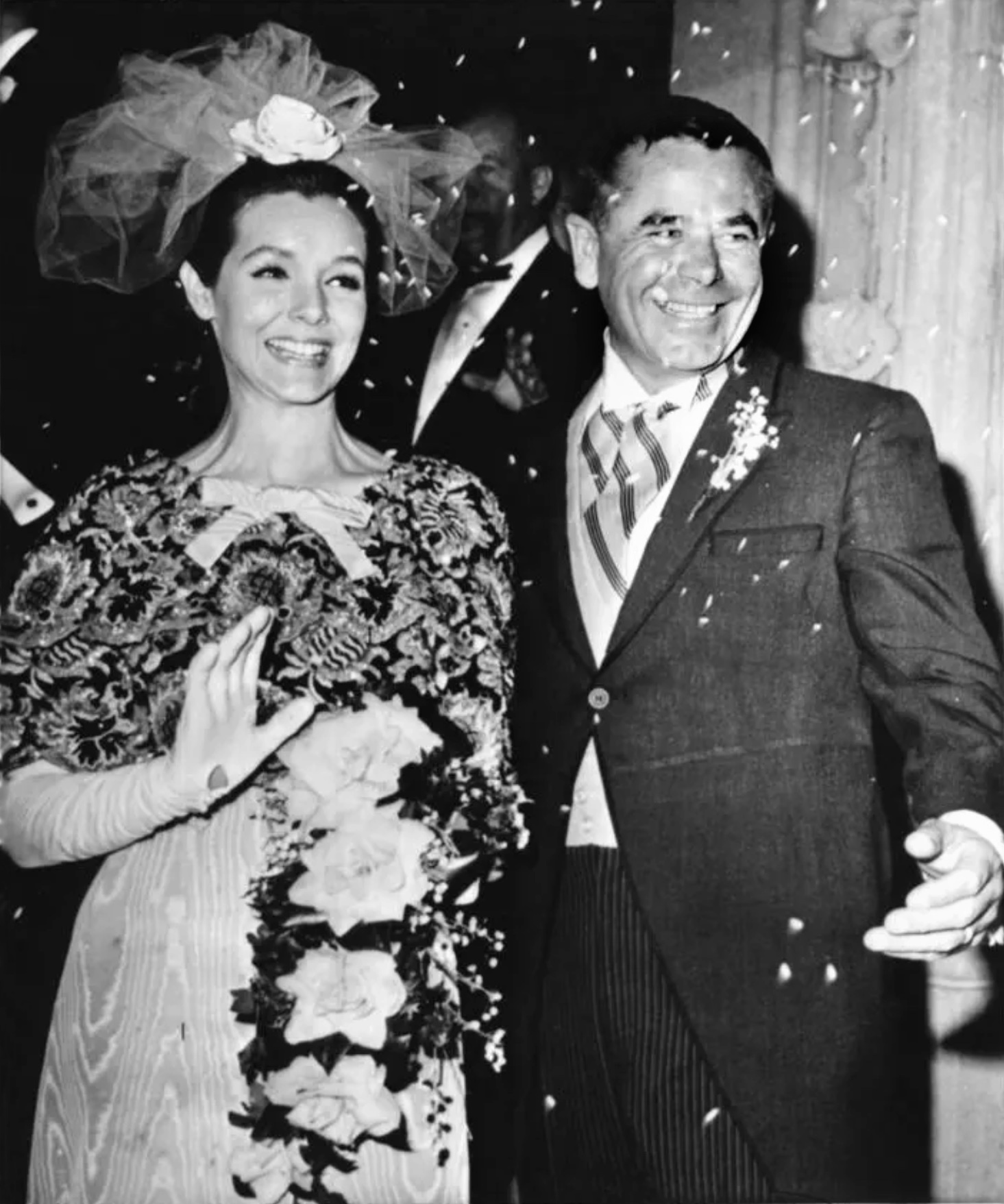
Ford and Kathryn Hays on their wedding day in 1966

Ford's first wife was actress and dancer Eleanor Powell (1943–1959), with whom he had his only child, actor Peter Ford (b. 1945). The couple appeared together on screen once in a short film produced in the 1950s titled Have Faith in Our Children. When they married, Powell was more famous than Ford. They divorced in 1959.

Ford did not remain on good terms with his ex-wives. He was a notorious womanizer, who had affairs with many of his leading ladies, including Rita Hayworth, Maria Schell, Geraldine Brooks, Stella Stevens, Gloria Grahame, Gene Tierney, Eva Gabor, and Barbara Stanwyck. He had a one-night stand with Marilyn Monroe in 1962 and a fling with Joan Crawford in the early 1940s.

Ford dated Christiane Schmidtmer, Linda Christian, and Vikki Dougan during the mid-1960s, and he also had relationships with Judy Garland, Connie Stevens, Suzanne Pleshette, Rhonda Fleming, Roberta Collins, Susie Lund, Terry Moore, Angie Dickinson, Debbie Reynolds, Jill St. John, Brigitte Bardot, and Loretta Young. He subsequently married actress Kathryn Hays (1966–1969), and marriages to Cynthia Hayward (1977–1984) and Jeanne Baus (1993–1994) followed; all four marriages ended in divorce. He also had a long-term relationship with actress Hope Lange in the early 1960s. According to his son Peter Ford's book Glenn Ford: A Life (2011), Ford had affairs with 146 actresses, all of which were documented in his personal diaries, including a 40-year, intermittent affair with Rita Hayworth that began during the filming of Gilda in 1945. Their affair resumed during the making of their 1948 film The Loves of Carmen. Ford had also been engaged to Debra Morris in the 1980s and Karen Johnson in the early 1990s.

In 1960, Ford moved to a home next to Hayworth's residence in Beverly Hills; they continued their relationship until the early 1980s.

Ford's affair with stripper and cult actress Liz Renay was chronicled by her in the 1991 book My First 2,000 Men. She ranked Ford as one of her top-five best lovers.

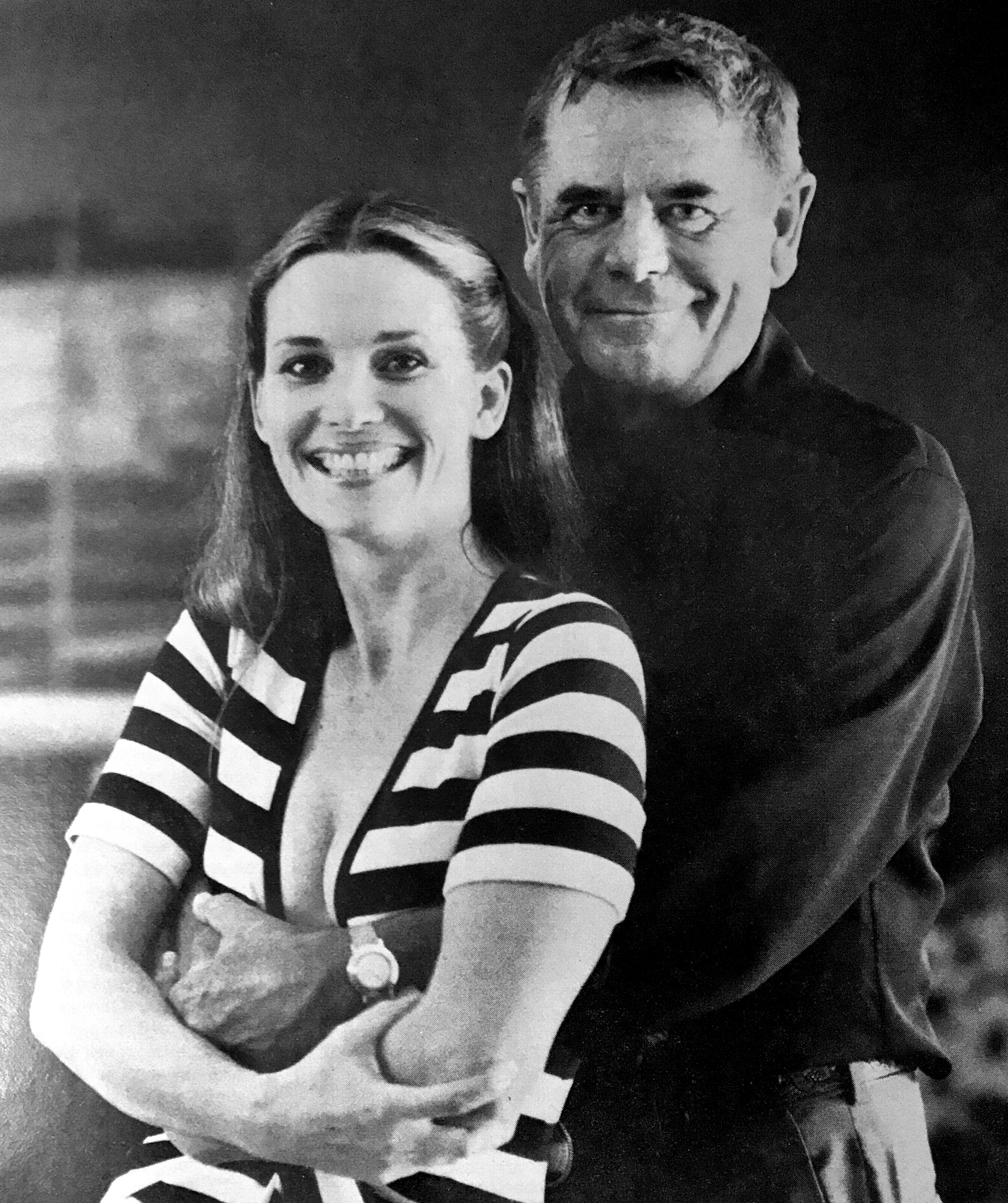
Ford with his third wife Cynthia Hayward in 1977

Ford also documented his many relationships by taping every phone conversation with all of his celebrity lovers and friends for 40 years. Presidents Richard Nixon and Ronald Reagan are on these recordings, as well as Rita Hayworth, Frank Sinatra, William Holden, John Wayne, Cary Grant, Ava Gardner, Gregory Peck, James Mason, Lucille Ball, James Stewart, Henry Fonda, Angie Dickinson, Joan Crawford, Bette Davis, Charlton Heston, and Debbie Reynolds. Ford installed the recording system to eavesdrop on the conversations of his first wife Eleanor Powell, fearing that she would discover his serial cheating and leave him. She divorced him in 1959 on grounds of adultery and mental cruelty.

At the height of his stardom, Glenn Ford supported the Democratic Party. He supported Franklin D. Roosevelt in the 1940s, Adlai Stevenson II in 1956, and John F. Kennedy in 1960. Ford later switched his support to the Republican Party. He campaigned for his old friend and fellow actor Ronald Reagan in the 1980 and 1984 presidential elections.

In May 1980, Ford attempted to purchase the Atlanta Flames of the National Hockey League, with the intention of keeping the team in the city. He was prepared to match a $14 million offer made by Byron and Daryl Seaman, but was outbid by an investment group led by Nelson Skalbania, which included the Seaman brothers. The group acquired the franchise for $16 million on May 23 and eventually moved it to Calgary.

Ford lived in Beverly Hills, California, where he illegally raised 140 White Leghorn chickens until he was stopped by the Beverly Hills Police Department.

== Death ==
Ford retired from acting in 1991 at age 75 with heart and circulatory problems. He suffered a series of minor strokes that left him in frail health in the years preceding his death. He died at his Beverly Hills home on August 30, 2006, at the age of 90.

== Awards ==
After being nominated in 1957, 1958, and 1962, Ford won a Golden Globe Award as Best Actor for his performance in Frank Capra's Pocketful of Miracles, a remake of Lady for a Day (1933) that Ford helped produce.

Ford was listed in Quigley's Annual List of Top Ten Box Office Champions in 1956, 1958, and 1959, topping the list in 1958. For 10 consecutive years from 1955 through 1964, Ford was listed among Quigley's list of the top-25 box-office stars.

In 1958, Ford won the Golden Laurel Award for Top Male Comedy Performance for his role in Don't Go Near the Water.

For his contribution to the motion-picture industry, Ford has a star on the Hollywood Walk of Fame at 6933 Hollywood Blvd. In 1978, he was inducted into the Western Performers Hall of Fame at the National Cowboy & Western Heritage Museum in Oklahoma City, Oklahoma. In 1987, he received the Donostia Award at the San Sebastián International Film Festival, and in 1992, he was awarded the Légion d'honneur medal for his actions in World War II.

Ford was scheduled to make his first public appearance in 15 years at a 90th-birthday tribute gala in his honor hosted by the American Cinematheque at Grauman's Egyptian Theatre in Hollywood on May 1, 2006. At the last minute, he was found to be too ill to attend. Anticipating during the previous week that his health might prevent his attendance, Ford had recorded a special filmed message for the audience, which was screened after a series of in-person tributes from friends, including Martin Landau, Shirley Jones, Jamie Farr, and Debbie Reynolds.

Asteroid 3852 Glennford is named in honor of Ford.

== U.S. military awards ==
|

[]
Navy and Marine Corps; Commendation Medal
Combat Action Ribbon	American Defense Service Medal	American Campaign Medal
Asiatic-Pacific Campaign Medal w/ 1 service star	World War II Victory Medal	National Defense Service Medal w/ 1 service star
Vietnam Service Medal w/ 1 service star	Armed Forces Reserve Medal	Navy Sharpshooter Rifle Ribbon
Medal of a liberated France	Unidentified	Unidentified

== Legacy ==
In a 1981 interview, Ford said his favorites of his own films were The Blackboard Jungle, Gilda, Cowboy, 3:10 to Yuma, The Sheepman, and The Gazebo. "They may not have been the best pictures I did, but they're the ones I remember most fondly because of the people involved", he said. "People like George Marshall, who directed six pictures with me, and Debbie Reynolds."

== Filmography ==
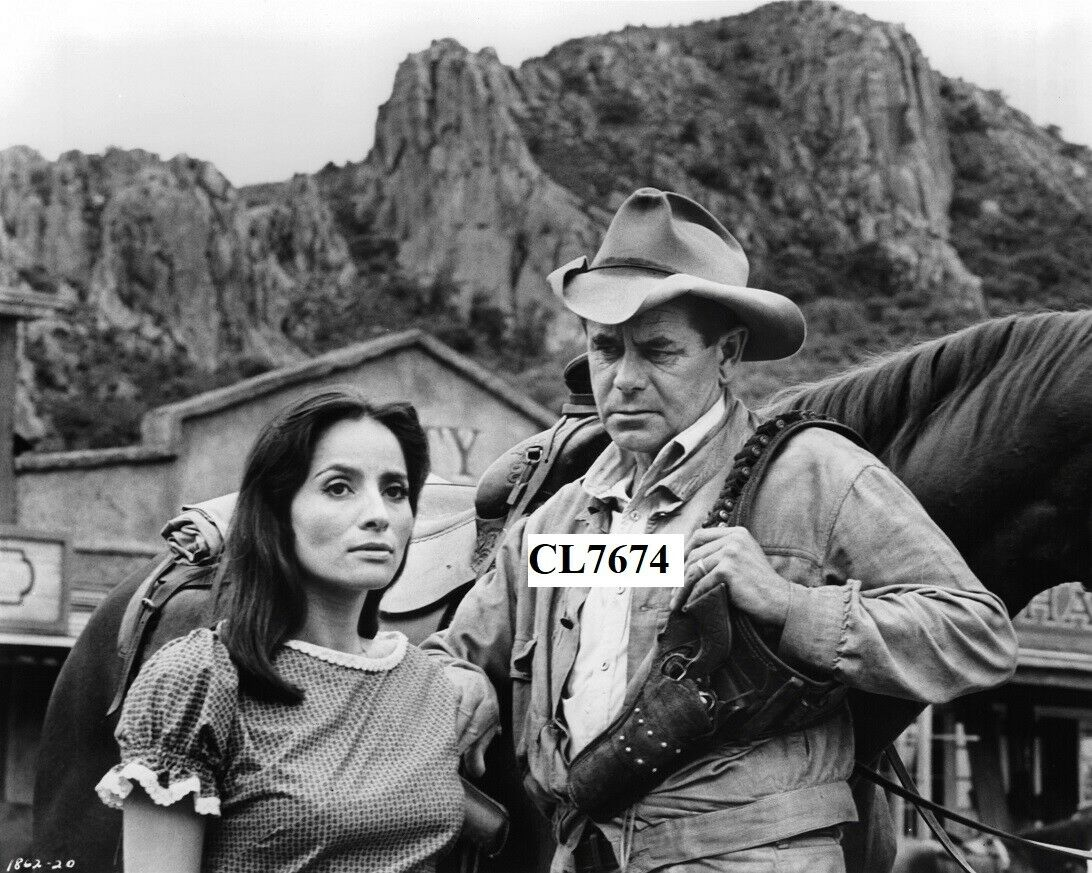
Ford and Pilar Pellicer in a publicity photo for the film Day of the Evil Gun (1968)

=== Film ===
Year	Title	Role	Notes
1937	Night in Manhattan	Emcee	Short film
1939	Heaven with a Barbed Wire Fence	Joe	
1939	My Son Is Guilty	Barney	
1940	Convicted Woman	Jim Brent	
1940	Men Without Souls	Johnny Adams	
1940	Babies for Sale	Steve Burton, aka Oscar Hanson	
1940	The Lady in Question	Pierre Morestan	
1940	Blondie Plays Cupid	Charlie	
1941	So Ends Our Night	Ludwig Kern	
1941	Texas	Tod Ramsey	
1941	Go West, Young Lady	Sheriff Tex Miller	
1942	The Adventures of Martin Eden	Martin Eden	
1942	Flight Lieutenant	Danny Doyle	
1943	The Desperadoes	Cheyenne Rogers	
1943	Destroyer	Mickey Donohue	
1946	Gilda	Johnny Farrell / Narrator	
1946	A Stolen Life	Bill Emerson	
1946	Gallant Journey	John Joseph Montgomery	
1947	Framed	Mike Lambert	
1948	The Mating of Millie	Doug Andrews	
1948	The Loves of Carmen	Don José Lizarabengoa	
1948	The Return of October	Prof. Bentley Bassett Jr.	
1948	The Man from Colorado	Col. Owen Devereaux	
1949	The Undercover Man	Frank Warren	
1949	Lust for Gold	Jacob "Dutch" Walz	
1949	Mr. Soft Touch	Joe Miracle	
1949	The Doctor and the Girl	Dr. Michael Corday	
1950	The White Tower	Martin Ordway	
1950	Convicted	Joe Hufford	
1950	The Flying Missile	Cmdr. William A. Talbot	
1951	The Redhead and the Cowboy	Gil Kyle	
1951	Follow the Sun	Ben Hogan	
1951	The Secret of Convict Lake	Jim Canfield	
1952	The Green Glove	Michael "Mike" Blake	
1952	Young Man with Ideas	Maxwell Webster	
1952	Affair in Trinidad	Steve Emery	
1953	Time Bomb aka Terror on a Train	Maj. Peter Lyncort	
1953	The Man from the Alamo	John Stroud	
1953	Plunder of the Sun	Al Colby	
1953	The Big Heat	Det. Sgt. Dave Bannion	
1953	Appointment in Honduras	Steve Corbett	
1954	City Story	Narrator	Short film
1954	Human Desire	Jeff Warren	
1955	The Americano	Sam Dent	
1955	The Violent Men	John Parrish	
1955	Blackboard Jungle	Richard Dadier	
1955	Interrupted Melody	Dr. Thomas "Tom" King	
1955	Trial	David Blake	
1956	Ransom!	David G. "Dave" Stannard	
1956	Jubal	Jubal Troop	
1956	The Fastest Gun Alive	George Temple / George Kelby Jr.	
1956	The Teahouse of the August Moon	Capt. Fisby	
1957	3:10 to Yuma	Ben Wade	
1957	Don't Go Near the Water	Lt. J.G. Max Siegel	
1958	Cowboy	Tom Reese	
1958	The Sheepman	Jason Sweet	
1958	Imitation General	MSgt. Murphy Savage	
1958	Torpedo Run	Lt. Cmdr. Barney Doyle	
1959	It Started with a Kiss	Sgt. Joe Fitzpatrick	
1959	The Gazebo	Elliott Nash	
1960	Cimarron	Yancey "Cimarron" Cravat	
1961	Cry for Happy	CPO Andy Cyphers	
1961	Pocketful of Miracles	Dave "the Dude" Conway	
1962	Four Horsemen of the Apocalypse	Julio Desnoyers	
1962	Experiment in Terror	John "Rip" Ripley	
1963	The Courtship of Eddie's Father	Tom Corbett	
1963	Love Is a Ball	John Lathrop Davis	
1964	Advance to the Rear	Capt. Jared Heath	
1964	Fate Is the Hunter	Sam C. McBane	
1964	Dear Heart	Harry Mork	
1965	The Rounders	Ben Jones	
1965	The Money Trap	Joe Baron	
1966	Is Paris Burning?	Lt. Gen. Omar N. Bradley	
1966	Rage	Doc Reuben	
1967	A Time for Killing	Maj. Tom Wolcott	
1967	The Last Challenge	Marshal Dan Blaine	
1968	Day of the Evil Gun	Lorne Warfield	
1969	Smith!	Smith	
1969	Heaven with a Gun	Jim Killian / Pastor Jim	
1973	Santee	Santee	
1976	Midway	RAdm. Raymond A. Spruance	
1978	Superman	Jonathan Kent	
1979	The Visitor	Det. Jake Durham	
1979	Day of the Assassin	Christakis	
1980	Virus	President Richardson	
1981	Happy Birthday to Me	Dr. David Faraday	
1989	Casablanca Express	Major Gen. Williams	
1990	Border Shootout	Sheriff John Danaher	
1991	Raw Nerve	Captain Gavin	

=== Television ===
Year	Title	Role	Notes
1957	A Day Called 'X'	Narrator	TV movie
1970	The Brotherhood of the Bell	Prof. Andrew Patterson	TV movie
1971	Cade's County	Sam Cade	TV series
1973	Jarrett	Sam Jarrett	TV movie
1974	Punch and Jody	Peter "Punch" Travers	TV movie
1974	The Disappearance of Flight 412	Colonel Pete Moore	TV movie
1974	The Greatest Gift	Rev. Holvak	TV movie
1975	The Family Holvak	Rev. Tom Holvak	TV series
1976	Once an Eagle	Gen. George Caldwell	TV miniseries
1977	The 3,000 Mile Chase	Paul Dvorak / Leonard Staveck	TV movie
1978	Evening in Byzantium	Jesse Craig	TV movie
1979	The Sacketts	Tom Sunday	TV miniseries
1979	Beggarman, Thief	David Donnelly	TV movie
1979	The Gift	Billy Devlin	TV movie
1986	Disneyland	Lucas Wheeler	TV series, episode: "My Town"
1991	Final Verdict	Rev. Rogers	TV movie, final film role

=== Box office ranking ===
For many years, the Quigley Publishing Company's Poll of Film Exhibitors ranked Ford as one of the most popular stars in the US:

- 1955 – 12th most popular
- 1956 – 5th most popular
- 1957 – 16th most popular
- 1958 – 1st most popular (also 7th most popular in the UK)
- 1959 – 6th most popular
- 1960 – 12th most popular
- 1961 – 15th most popular
- 1962 – 21st most popular
- 1963 – 19th most popular
- 1964 – 19th most popular

== Radio appearances ==
Year	Program	Episode/source
1942	Lux Radio Theatre	A Man to Remember
1946	Lux Radio Theatre	Gallant Journey
1947	Suspense	"End of the Road"
1947	Lux Radio Theatre	A Stolen Life
1949	Lux Radio Theatre	The Mating of Millie
