= MGM/UA Premiere Network =

- Type: Defunct broadcast television network
- Country: United States
- Broadcast area: Nationwide

Programming
- Language: English

Ownership
- Owner: MGM Television
- Key people: Larry Gershman (president of MGM/UA Television); Joseph C. Tirinato (MGM/UA's President of Television Distribution)

History
- Launched: November 10, 1984
- Closed: 1991

Links
- Website: Official website

The Premiere Network, or MGM/UA Premiere Network, was an ad hoc television network created by Metro-Goldwyn-Mayer/United Artists, which announced plans to launch in 1984, originally set for an October launch. By 1991, the name was shortened to simply the MGM Premiere Network.

== Background ==
In 1982, Metro-Goldwyn-Mayer Television was renamed MGM/UA Television Distribution after the merger with United Artists the previous year. In 1984, MGM/UA TV launched an ad hoc TV network, MGM/UA Premiere Network, with movies.

The MGM/UA Premiere Network along with MCA TV's Universal Pictures Debut Network came as a response to the weakened network television market for films in packages. To put things into perspective, virtually all movies in the early 1980s played on the cable television services before being made available for network showings. Thus, this resulted in the audience for many movies on network television diminishing dramatically.

The service was expected to broadcast 24 movies in double-runs once a month for two years. These films had never previously been shown on network television.

The package would be sold on a barter basis over a two-year period, where MGM received 10½ minutes of advertising time within a two-hour movie telecast in prime time, while its stations would retain 11½ minutes. After this particular run, the movies featured on the Premiere Network could be marketed to cable television for an exclusive six month long run. They would then go back to the stations for purchase on a cash basis.

The plan was estimated to bring a total of $72 million to the studio on the initial 24 films involved, whereas had those films had gone directly to syndication, the total revenue would have been no more than $30 million. Another $500,000 would have been added to the four or five million dollars the film might have generated in its first cable airing. Based on various assumptions, MGM/UA believed that they could gross $24 million in total from the Premiere Network run, $12 million from the pay TV window, and $1.2 million per title in the stage three syndication phase.

According to MGM/UA television president Lawrence E. Gershman, the plan was born "out of necessity" to offset a disturbing drop in revenues. MGM/UA initially spent $1 million to promote the Premiere Network. In the past, the major networks turned some of MGM/UA's films down flat, while in other cases, they had offered fees that Gershman considered too low. Gershman added that the three networks were just not buying pictures in groups anymore, so they had to get revenue from somewhere else.

== Distribution and affiliation agreements ==
By the summer of 1984, the network had signed affiliation agreements with eight television stations in large markets. 100 television stations were signed as affiliates by October 1984, with the planned launch pushed back and set for November 10 of that year. Among these stations were WPIX in New York, KTLA in Los Angeles and WGN in Chicago. Other stations affiliated included KMPH-TV in Fresno, KTMA in Minneapolis, KCPQ in Seattle, KCAU in Sioux City, WTTG in Washington, D.C.

According to Lawrence E. Gershman, it only took two or three months to line the affiliates up because they are hungry for product and recognize this was a situation where everybody won. In other words, they could sell their advertising spots for more money than they could have if the movies had already appeared on network television. The independent stations get the films for no charge during that first month. Instead of paying a fee, the stations agree to relinquish 10 1/2 (of 23) advertising minutes to MGM/UA, so that the studio can sell those advertising spots itself. Also, each station agreed to run 75 on the air promotional spots announcing the MGM/UA Premiere Network.

The Premiere Network was distributed in part by LBS Communications.

== List of films featured ==
- A Christmas Story
- Apocalypse Now
- The Beastmaster
- The Black Stallion Returns
- Blue Steel
- Brainstorm
- Cannery Row
- Cat's Eye
- Child's Play
- Clash of the Titans
- Curse of the Pink Panther
- Endangered Species
- Electric Dreams
- Fame
- Forced Vengeance
- The Formula
- The Ice Pirates
- The French Lieutenant's Woman
- My Favorite Year
- Pennies from Heaven
- The Pope of Greenwich Village
- Reckless
- Red Dawn
- The Return of a Man Called Horse
- Romantic Comedy
- Shoot the Moon
- Spaceballs
- Thief
- To Live and Die in L.A.
- Trail of the Pink Panther
- True Confessions
- WarGames
- The Final Option
- Whose Life Is It Anyway?
- The Year of Living Dangerously
- Yentl

=== WarGames lawsuit ===
The very first film to air on the Premiere Network when it launched on November 10, 1984, was 1981's Clash of the Titans followed by Pennies from Heaven in December. It was initially expected that smash hits like Rocky III, WarGames, and Octopussy wouldn't be park of the package since MGM/UA was able to sell them to the major networks for hefty fees. But come 1988, the creators of the 1983 film WarGames filed a $75-million-plus lawsuit against MGM/UA for packaging the film for sale to syndicated television with 24 lesser box office successes. The film's producer Leonard Goldberg, director John Badham, and writers Lawrence Lasker and Walter F. Parkes claimed that they were shortchanged $5 million by the package deal and wanted the studio's distribution rights to the film terminated, plus $50 million in punitive damages.

== Ratings ==
According to MGM/UA, if the initial 24 films drew strong ratings, then they would continue selling most of its films to television in this manner and hoped to add to the number of participating stations. According to journalist John Dempsey, the higher the rating, the better the movie would play when it later became part of a 30 title syndication block. This because good track records give them a familiarity with TV watchers that encourages repeat viewing. From September 4, 1988 through January 1, 1989, the Premiere Network earned a 7.5 rating. This placed it at eleventh place among the top barter series for the first 16 weeks of the 1988–89 United States television season.

== See also ==
- List of MGM Television programs
- Fourth television network
- This TV#Movies
