= When Havoc Struck =

American documentary television series

- Genre: Documentary
- Presented by: Glenn Ford
- Country of origin: United States
- Original language: English
- No. of seasons: 1
- No. of episodes: 12

Production
- Running time: 30 minutes

Original release
- Network: First-run syndication (Mobil Showcase Network)
- Release: January 11 – March 15, 1978

When Havoc Struck is an American documentary television series that is distributed by ITC Entertainment and ran in first-run syndication via the attempted fourth television network Mobil Showcase Network from January 11 until March 15, 1978.

Hosted by Glenn Ford, the program features stories of disasters.

== Episodes ==
- "Camille Was No Lady"
- "SOS - Disasters at Sea"
- "The Bel-Air Fire"
- "Bridge Collapses"
- "The Great Ohio River Flood"
- "The Dust Bowl"
- "How Safe is It to Fly"
- "Volcanoes"
- "Earthquakes"
- "Life at the Limit"
- "The Children of Aberfan"
- "Disaster Airship"
