= Heavy Action =

Musical piece composed by Johnny Pearson

"Heavy Action" is a piece of music composed by Johnny Pearson for KPM Music. Composed in 1970 and featuring a strong brass and string fanfare opening, "Heavy Action" soon became a well established sporting theme tune, most associated in the United Kingdom as the theme for Superstars and in the United States as the theme music not only for ABC and ESPN's Monday Night Football, but also for Animal Planet's Puppy Bowl. APM Music exclusively controls the rights to the song in North America.

== Superstars ==
The BBC commissioned Pearson to write the piece for its music library, while he was working as a member of the Top of the Pops orchestra accompanying pop stars on the weekly music TV show. During production of the first series of Superstars in 1973, "Heavy Action" was chosen as the theme music, owing to its high energy brass and string fanfare opening and Olympian themes. The show (which aired in its first run from 1973 to 1985 and has been revived regularly since then) has always used the theme tune for all episodes of the show in its various incarnations, including the latest 2012 Olympic Superstars edition. The theme is now synonymous with sport in the United Kingdom, and was used extensively by the BBC during their coverage of the 2012 Summer Olympics.

== Monday Night Football ==
In the 1975 NFL season, ABC, which had developed the original Superstars show in the US, acquired the rights to use "Heavy Action" as the opening theme music to Monday Night Football, although it would not become the official theme until the 1989 NFL season. It was also used as the background music during a halftime segment as Howard Cosell narrated highlights of the previous Sunday's games. In 1990, Edd Kalehoff arranged an entirely new recording of "Heavy Action" for the final years of Monday Night Football on ABC.

For the 2006 NFL season, a team of composers comprising Robert Anthony Navarro, Cris Velasco, Sven Spieker, Sascha Dikiciyan and Chris Rickwood were hired by APM Music (APM) to arrange yet another entirely new recording of "Heavy Action" for the rebirth of Monday Night Football on ESPN.

For the 2010 NFL season, Cris Velasco, Robert Anthony Navarro, Rod Abernathy, and Joachim Svare were hired by APM to do several arrangements of "Heavy Action" in various musical styles including rock, hip-hop and holiday for Monday Night Football on ESPN.

For the 2018 NFL season, ESPN brought back the original Pearson arrangement of "Heavy Action" as the main theme for Monday Night Football.

For the 2022 NFL season, ESPN used a remix of "Heavy Action" by EDM producer and DJ Marshmello as the intro theme for Monday Night Football.

== Puppy Bowl ==
On 6 February 2005, Animal Planet also acquired the rights to use "Heavy Action" as the opening theme music to Puppy Bowl, and it was used as the official theme ever since.

== Other uses ==
- Three years after its arrival on Monday Night Football, this same music was used as the theme for the now defunct syndicated SFM Holiday Network monthly offering of family feature films.
- NFL Films used this piece of music along with the narration of John Facenda in its Super Bowl IX highlights film.
- In 1975 British Leyland used the soundtrack on the launch film of the 18–22 Series Austin Princess saloon.
- The music was also used as the theme for the American television show Ten Who Dared (1976), which was a reworking of the BBC series The Explorers (1975).
- It was used in the 1976 Indianapolis 500 and 1977 Indianapolis 500 opening as Monday Night Football Producers Roone Arledge and Chuck Howard along with Director Chet Forte also worked on this other ABC Sports staple.
- A remix by Si Begg was included on the album Bootleg Beats, an album of remixes of KPM Music library music.
- Since January 2012 Chris Evans has used the song as the opening theme to his BBC Radio 2 breakfast show on Monday mornings.
- WWE has used the song for their Halftime Heat specials which aired at halftime of the Super Bowl, most recently for Super Bowl LIII.
- It was used in the introduction to the "Genkibowl VII" DLC missions in the video game Saints Row: The Third.
