= Men Without Souls =

- Directed by: Nick Grinde
- Written by: Harvey Gates; Robert Hardy Andrews
- Starring: Barton MacLane; John Litel; Glenn Ford; Rochelle Hudson
- Cinematography: Benjamin Kline
- Edited by: James Sweeney
- Distributed by: Columbia Pictures
- Release date: May 20, 1940
- Running time: 62 minutes
- Country: United States
- Language: English

Men Without Souls is a 1940 black and white crime movie, starring Barton MacLane and Glenn Ford and directed by Nick Grinde.

== Plot ==
Johnny Adams goes to prison, under a false name, with the intention of killing the sadistic Captain White, a bastard guard, who had beaten Johnny's father to death just before the end of his sentence. Not knowing Johnny's true identity, White asks him to spy on his cellmate "Blackie" Drew, but Johnny and Blackie develop a mutual respect for one another.

Rev. Thomas Storm, the prison's idealistic new chaplain, well-meaning but seen by the prisoners as a fink, learns of Johnny's plan and persuades him to give it up and do his time peacefully, but when "Blackie" quietly kills White, he frames Johnny out of misguided spite. The honesty of Rev. Storm ensures that Johnny gets convicted, and sentenced to the chair, but Storm has a feeling that Blackie is holding out some angle on the truth.

Only Blackie can save Johnny, but will the truth set Johnny free, or an explosion in the prison boiler room?

== Cast ==
Actor	Role
Barton MacLane	Blackie Drew
John Litel	Reverend Thomas Storm
Rochelle Hudson	Suzan Leonard
Glenn Ford	Johnny Adams
Don Beddoe	Warden Schafer
Cy Kendall	Capt. White
Eddie Laughton	Lefty
Dick Curtis	Duke
Richard Fiske	Crowley
Walter Soderling	Old Muck
Walter Sande	First Reporter (unconfirmed)
