= Fourth television network =

American hypothetical competitor to the Big Three networks

The early history of television in the United States, particularly between 1956 and 1986, was dominated by the Big Three television networks: NBC, CBS, and ABC. The term fourth television network was used within the industry during this era to refer to a theoretical fourth commercial broadcast (over-the-air) television network that would operate as a direct competitor to the "Big Three".

Prior to 1956, the DuMont Television Network operated as an existing fourth network alongside ABC, CBS, and NBC, but an inability to find solid financial ground, a weaker affiliate base, and internal competition from co-owner Paramount Pictures all contributed to DuMont's closure. Multiple companies, film studios and television station owners all either considered, announced or launched networks or program services that aspired to be the "fourth network", but none succeeded. Several of these attempts never advanced from being niche program services, while others either failed to launch or failed after launching. General consensus within the industry and by television critics was that a fourth television network was impossible; one television critic wrote, "Industry talk about a possible full-time, full-service, commercial network structured like the existing big three, ABC, CBS and NBC, pops up much more often than the fictitious town of Brigadoon." Non-commercial educational television, especially with stations aligned with National Educational Television and successor PBS, also found success as program services with network-capable functions.

The launch of Fox in October 1986 was met with ridicule; despite industry skepticism and initial instability, the network eventually proved profitable by the early 1990s, secured rights to NFL football in 1993 and initiated a major affiliate realignment the following year. Fox became the first successful fourth network, eventually surpassing the Big Three networks in demographics and overall ratings between 2004 to 2012, and again between 2020 to 2021.

== Background ==
Logo for the DuMont Television Network

In the 1940s, four television networks began operations by linking local television stations together via AT&T's coaxial cable telephone network. These links allowed stations to share television programs across great distances, and allowed advertisers to air commercial advertisements nationally. Local stations became affiliates of one or more of the four networks, depending on the number of licensed stations within a given media market in this early era of television broadcasting. These four networks – the National Broadcasting Company (NBC), the Columbia Broadcasting System (CBS), the American Broadcasting Company (ABC), and the DuMont Television Network (DuMont) – would be the only full-time television networks during the 1940s and 1950s, as in 1948, the Federal Communications Commission (FCC) suspended approvals for new station construction permits. Although other companies – including Paramount Pictures (with the Paramount Television Network) – announced network plans or began limited network operations, these companies withdrew from television after the first few years, or in the Paramount Television Network's case the service withered through attrition over the same span as did DuMont's, losing most of its programming by 1953 and ceasing operations in 1956.

The FCC's "freeze," as it was called, was supposed to last for six months. When it was lifted after four years in 1952, there were only four full-time television networks. The FCC would only license three local VHF stations in most U.S. television markets. A fourth station, the FCC ruled, would have to broadcast on the UHF band. Hundreds of new UHF stations began operations, but many of these stations quickly folded because television set manufacturers were not required to include a built-in UHF tuner until 1964 as part of the All-Channel Act. Most viewers could not receive UHF stations, and most advertisers would not advertise on stations which few could view. Without the advertising revenue enjoyed by the VHF stations, many UHF station owners either returned their station licenses to the FCC, attempted to trade licenses with educational stations on VHF, attempted to purchase a VHF station in a nearby market to move into theirs, or cut operating costs in attempts to stay in business.

Since there were four networks but only three VHF stations in most major U.S. cities, one network would be forced to broadcast on a UHF outlet with a limited audience. NBC and CBS had been the larger networks, and the most successful broadcasters in radio. As they began bringing their popular radio programs and stars into the television medium, they sought – and attracted – the most profitable VHF television stations. In many areas, ABC and DuMont were left with undesirable UHF stations, or were forced to affiliate with NBC or CBS stations on a part-time basis. Although ABC had a radio network on which to draw affiliate loyalty and revenue, it was only a fraction the size of NBC and CBS. As a result, it was near bankruptcy in 1952. DuMont, without a radio network as a lifeline, was unprofitable after 1953.

A fatal blow was struck in 1953 when ABC merged with Paramount's former theater chain, United Paramount Theaters. The deal gave ABC a badly-needed cash infusion, and at least on paper gave it the wherewithal to offer a national service on the scale of CBS and NBC.

DuMont realized the situation was untenable. However, when Paramount vetoed a merger offer from ABC, DuMont announced in April 1955 that all remaining scripted programming would be dropped by September, effectively ending regular operations; the network's former owned-station group (WABD and WTTG) was spun off later that year as DuMont Broadcasting. The end of DuMont allowed ABC to experience a profit increase of 40 percent that year, although ABC would not reach parity with NBC and CBS until the 1970s. The end of DuMont left many UHF stations without a reliable source of programming, and many were left to become independent stations. Several new television companies were formed through the years in failed attempts to band these stations together in a new fourth network.

== Rationale ==
Some within the industry felt there was a need for a fourth network; that complaints about diversity in programming could be addressed by adding another network. "We need a fourth, a fifth, and a sixth network," one broadcaster stated. While critics rejected "the nightly tripe being offered [to] the public on the three major networks," they were skeptical that a fourth network would offer better material: "[O]ne wonders if a new network lacking the big money already being spread three ways will be able to come up with tripe that is equal. Certainly a new network is not going to stress quality programming when the ratings indicate that the American public prefer hillbillies, cowboys and spies. A new network will have to deliver an audience if it is to attract the big spenders from the ranks of sponsors."

Advertisers, too, called for the creation of a fourth network. Representatives from Procter & Gamble and General Foods, two of the largest advertisers in the U.S., hoped the competition from a fourth network would lower advertising rates on the Big Three. Independent television producers, too, called for a fourth network after battles with the Big Three.

== Unfulfilled attempts ==
=== George Fox Organization network ===
George Fox, the president of the George Fox Organization, announced tentative plans for a television film network in May 1956. The plan was to sign 45 to 50 affiliate stations; each of these stations would have input in deciding what programs the network would air. Four initial programs – Jack for Jill, I'm the Champ, Answer Me This, and It's a Living – were slated to be broadcast; the programs would be filmed in Hollywood. However, only 17 stations had agreed to affiliate in May. The film network never made it off the ground, and none of the planned programs aired.

=== Mutual Television Network ===
The Mutual Broadcasting System (Mutual), established as a cooperative radio network owned by the affiliates, showed varied interest in a television counterpart. During the network's annual shareholder meeting on April 1950, network president Frank White announced the tentative formation of the "Mutual Television Network" comprising stations in New York (WOR-TV), Los Angeles (KHJ-TV), Chicago (WGN-TV), Boston (WNAC-TV) and Washington, D.C. (WOIC), all television adjuncts of existing network affiliates. A sixth station in Pittsburgh was proposed, but its originating radio station failed to gain a TV license. The 5-station attempt would fail in short time. When General Teleradio de facto became the network's owner in 1951 by acquiring all but one of the network's largest affiliates, General Tire president Thomas F. O'Neil started putting a potential Mutual all-movie network together. Mutual purchased a large group of English films and paid $1.5 million for the right of unlimited play for two years of Roy Rogers and Gene Autry westerns.

=== NTA Film Network ===
On October 15, 1956, National Telefilm Associates launched the NTA Film Network, a syndication service that distributed both films and television programs to independent television stations and stations affiliated with NBC, CBS or ABC; the network had signed agreements with over 100 affiliate stations. The ad hoc network's flagship station was WNTA-TV (channel 13) in New York City. The NTA Network was launched as a "fourth TV network," and trade papers of the time referred to it as a new television network. Despite this effort, by 1961, NTA carried a significant debt load and WNTA-TV was losing money against stiff competition from independent stations WNEW-TV and WOR-TV.

After being placed on the market, WNTA was sold to the Educational Broadcasting Corporation and relaunched the following year as non-commercial station WNDT, aligned with National Educational Television (NET). National Telefilm Associates continued syndication services for stations for several years after the closure of NTA Film Network, with Divorce Court was seen as late as 1969.

=== Pat Weaver ===
Pat Weaver, a former president of NBC, twice attempted to launch his own television network; daughter Sigourney Weaver once said, "it was always his dream to transform television." According to one source, the network would have been called the Pat Weaver Prime Time Network. Although the new network was announced, no programs were ever produced.

=== Unisphere/Mizlou ===
In mid-1965, radio businessman Vincent C. Piano proposed the Unisphere Broadcasting System. The service would have operated for 2½ hours each night. However, Piano had difficulty signing affiliates; a year later, no launch date had been set, and the network still lacked a "respectable number of affiliates in major markets."

The network finally launched under the name Mizlou Television Network in 1968, but the concept had changed. Like the Hughes Network, Mizlou only carried occasional sporting and special events. Despite developing a sophisticated microwave and landline broadcasting system, the company never developed into a major television network.

=== United Network ===
On July 12, 1966, warehouse entrepreneur Daniel H. Overmyer announced the launch of the Overmyer Network (ON), to be built around Overmyer's chain of five planned UHF stations and an existing station in Toledo, Ohio. Headed by former ABC president Oliver Treyz, ON planned to have up to eight hours of program nightly, along with news programming from United Press International. Due to a cash crunch brought on by Overmyer's other businesses, majority control of ON was sold to a 14-investor syndicate and renamed the United Network weeks before it launched. Overmyer's unbuilt television stations were also sold off at the same time. United's lone program, The Las Vegas Show, debuted on May 1, 1967, to 107 stations, many of which were already affiliated with a Big Three network.

The poor timing of the launch limited available budgets for prospective advertisers; this, coupled with onerous charges to transmit over AT&T Bell System phone lines, resulted in the network's failure and the cancellation of Las Vegas after one month. Ownership filed for Chapter 11 bankruptcy several weeks later, and despite multiple teases of relaunching as a supplier of news and public affairs programming, United never resumed operations. While United managed to transmit programming unlike prior attempts at a fourth network, the network was later regarded as a "fiasco", "a promotion stunt", "a fraud", and a "tax write-off". New York Times columnist Jack Gould wrote that United's failure was "further evidence that expansion of commercial TV is little more than a pipe dream".

=== Kaiser Broadcasting ===
Industrialist Henry J. Kaiser assembled a chain of six UHF stations in the mid-1960s under the Kaiser Broadcasting name. In September 1967, Kaiser announced their intentions to create a television network with programming supplied by their station group; this included Lou Gordon from WKBD-TV, Hy Lit from WKBS-TV, Alan Douglas from WKBF-TV, and Joe Dolan from KBHK-TV. This planned network never gathered traction, and Kaiser faced significant financial losses from constructing the stations, with only WKBD-TV turning a profit. Gordon's program, however, was syndicated until his 1977 death. Kaiser Broadcasting was sold to Field Communications in 1977.

=== Industry speculation ===
In a series of columns in 1969 about a theoretical fourth network, Newspaper Enterprise Association writer Joan Crosby floated Westinghouse Broadcasting, Metromedia and Hughes Television Network (HTN) as possible candidates; Westinghouse was in the middle of merger talks with MCA Inc., while Metromedia was entertaining a purchase by the Transamerica Corporation. HTN was founded in 1956 as sports syndicator Sports Network, and purchased and renamed by business magnate Howard Hughes in 1968. Crosby speculated HTN could potentially add non-sports programs that "...can change viewer's dialing habits... it would be one way, less costly and with far less of a risk, to start the illusionary fourth network".

While Metromedia "dabbled at creating a fourth network," including a failed 1976 joint venture with Ogilvy and Mather called MetroNet, the company continued to operate solely as a station owner and syndicator. Westinghouse president Donald McGannon denied his company had any network aspirations, estimating it would take $200 million per year to operate a full-time television network and a modest news department. HTN continued to operate as a sports syndicator and never offered non-sports programming.

=== Television News Inc. ===
After the failure of the United Network in 1967, former ABC Radio president Robert Pauley was briefly retained by United ownership to relaunch the network as a supplier of news and public affairs programming. The following year, Pauley briefly pitched a television news service of his own, using the same concept, before being hired by Mutual Broadcasting. In 1973, Pauley became the founding chief executive officer for Television News Inc. (TVN), a newsfilm service for stations in the United States and Canada. TVN was majority-owned by the Coors Brewing Company, with Visnews as a minority owner, after Joseph Coors was receptive to Pauley's idea of a syndicated news supplier. TVN also proposed using the Westar satellite system to transmit programming to affiliates on a full-time basis.

A political conservative sympathetic to the views of the John Birch Society, Coors viewed TVN as an "alternative" to the established news services of ABC, NBC and CBS, which he deemed to be "liberal" in content. Former Nixon administration official Roger Ailes served as an executive for TVN briefly in 1975. TVN was shut down in October 1975 after Coors, who had been nominated to the board of the Corporation for Public Broadcasting, was scrutinized over his ownership of TVN and imposing of political beliefs into news content, along with his disdain for public broadcasting. Coors's CPB board nomination was rejected by the U.S. Senate on the same day that TVN closed.

=== Paramount Television Service ===
In 1977, Paramount Pictures made tentative plans to launch the Paramount Television Service, or Paramount Programming Service, a new fourth television network. Paramount also purchased HTN, including its satellite time. Set to launch in April 1978, it would have initially consisted of only one night a week of programming for three hours, with 30 Movies of the Week that would have followed Star Trek: Phase II on Saturday nights. PTS/PMTS was delayed until the 1978–79 season due to advertisers that were cautious of purchasing commercial slots on the planned network. This plan was aborted when executives decided the venture would be too costly, with no guarantee of profitability. Interestingly enough, American billionaire businessman and media executive Barry Diller (who proposed the idea of Paramount launching a TV network when he worked for the studio), would end up taking his idea with him when he was brought onboard 20th Century Fox, proceeding to work with the studio's owner, Rupert Murdoch, after it acquired the Metromedia-owned stations from John Kluge, to launch the Fox Broadcasting Company (considered to be a "spiritual successor" to the Paramount Television Service).

== Ad hoc and "occasional" networks ==
In the 1970s, the "occasional" television networks started to appear with greater frequency with Norman Lear, Mobil Showcase Network, Capital Cities Communications, and Operation Prime Time, all entering the fray along with Metromedia. In 1978, SFM Media Service, which assisted with the Mobil Showcase Network, launched its own occasional network, the SFM Holiday Network and the General Foods Golden Showcase Network. SFM was a provider of ad hoc network as a service to other clients including Del Monte Foods.

A few ad hoc networks were developed during the 1980s as conventional full-time networks were not buying theatrical feature films as much due to declining ratings for those telecasts, with networks arguing that pay television channels and videotapes had reduced the demand for films compared to those seen in the 1960s and 1970s. The studios considered the fact that the networks usually ran their films during rating sweeps periods up against other theatrical films, as being the cause of the slide in viewership. These ad hoc networks, formed by an advertiser or studio, would provide to the production companies ratings histories that the pay services could not provide for sales in a syndicated package, and only tie up the movie for a two-week window. These were set up using a barter system, with the network retaining five minutes per hour of ad time. Besides the Premiere Network and Debut Network, Orion Pictures, Warner Bros. and a joint venture of Viacom and Tribune Broadcasting all followed suit in announcing the launch of their own ad hoc networks in late 1984.

=== MGM Family and MGM/UA Premiere ===
MGM Television entered the field with its self-proclaimed fourth network, the MGM Family Network (MFN), on September 9, 1973, with the movie The Yearling on 145 stations. MFN was created to fill the family programming void from 5:00 to 8:00 p.m. due to the implementation of the Prime Time Access Rule, using movies from the MGM library scheduled to air on one Sunday every two months. The premiere of MFN registered a 40 rating. The network broadcast only four times a year in September, January, March and May, and had 14 films assigned to the network from the MGM library.

By 1984, the studio, now known as MGM/United Artists, created the MGM/UA Premiere Network, an ad hoc network that broadcast 24 movies in double-runs on a monthly basis. Affiliation agreements had been signed with eight large-market television stations by that summer; MGM received 10 1/2 minutes of advertising time within a two-hour movie telecast, while its stations would retain 11 1/2 minutes. 100 television stations were signed as affiliates by October 1984, with the planned launch pushed back and set for November 10 of that year.

=== Operation Prime Time ===
Operation Prime Time (OPT) was a consortium of American independent television stations to develop prime time programming for independent stations. OPT and its spin-off syndication company, Television Program Enterprises (TPE), were formed by Al Masini. During its existence, OPT was considered the de facto fourth television network.

OPT planned three book adaptions for their shows to air in May, July and November or December 1978 with two of them being John Jakes's The Bastard and The Rebels leading the way for the rest of the book series that OPT optioned including two then currently being written. Martin Gosch's and Richard Hammer's The Last Testimony of Lucky Luciano was the third adaptation scheduled for 1978.

=== Golden Showcase Network ===
The Kraft General Foods Golden Showcase Network, or Golden Showcase Network, was launched in 1980 with assistance from SFM and ran at least to 1989. Programs on the Golden Showcase included The Attic: The Hiding of Anne Frank and Little Girl Lost.

=== Debut Network ===
The Universal Pictures Debut Network, or simply the Debut Network, was a similar ad hoc film network created by MCA Television. The service reached agreements with ten stations in larger markets such as New York City, Los Angeles and Chicago by late 1984. The network planned to launch in two stages beginning in September 1985. In 1988, the movie network broadcast a special edition of Dune as a two-night event, with additional footage not included in the film's original release. In June 1990, the Debut Network was ranked in fifth place among the ten highest-rated syndicated programs according to Nielsen.

=== Harmony Premiere Network ===
In 1987, Harmony Gold USA collaborated with international backers, including Société Française de Productions and Reteeurope, both of the respective French, Italian and Spanish interests to set up a new project, and what the worldwide market represented to set up the Harmony Premiere Network, which was to be the next Operation Prime Time, and brings together U.S. and international financers to co-produce the products for Harmony Gold.

In 1987, the company had teamed up with Italian company Silvio Berlusconi Communications to pay $150 million for a pact, to turn out 100 hours of television programming, and partnering will be dubbed by America 5 Enterprises, which will produce miniseries, TV series and telefilms using U.S. and international talent, and the two companies will share equally in costs and profits, and the company would handle worldwide and domestic television rights, with the exception of Europe, where distribution of the company will be handled through Berlusconi arm Reteitalia.

In 1988, after the cancellation of Robotech II: The Sentinels, a number of the staff were recruited to work at Saban Entertainment. Carl Macek, along with his friend Jerry Beck went on to found Streamline Pictures. Meanwhile, Harmony Gold began moving away from production and began focusing more on film distribution, dot-com ventures and real estate.

=== Hollywood Premiere Network ===
After the scuttling of the plans for PPS, MCA tried again. The Hollywood Premiere Network was formed by MCA and Chris-Craft Industries, owner of several major independent stations via their United Television subsidiary. With basic cable channels snapping up movie packages, independents looked to making their own programming. Hollywood Premiere was originally tested as a two night programming block on United's KCOP and MCA's WWOR before syndicating the programming to other markets. The block took three new programs and paired them with the existing Paramount syndicated series Star Trek: The Next Generation; They Came from Outer Space and She-Wolf of London were paired in prime time Tuesday, while Shades of L.A. followed The Next Generation in prime time Wednesday. The budget per episodes were estimated at $600,000 less than the network per episode cost at $1 million that the partners claimed. The Hollywood Premiere Network began broadcasting on October 9, 1990. MCA and Chris-Craft canceled the package after the first season. However, MCA TV was shopping the block and its shows at the NATPE January 1991 TV trade show.

== Fox Broadcasting Company ==
Logo for the Fox Broadcasting Company

By 1985, there were 267 independent television stations operational in the U.S., most of which were broadcasting on VHF and UHF.

Rupert Murdoch, an Australian publishing mogul, initiated two major transactions in 1985 that finally resulted in a fourth television network. Murdoch's News Corporation first purchased controlling interest in 20th Century-Fox Film Corporation (TCF) on March 20, 1985, for $250 million, then on May 6, 1985, purchased Metromedia's program syndication unit and six television stations for $2.5 billion. The latter purchase immediately launched industry speculation of a new fourth network, as Murdoch boasted that the Metromedia stations could be used to exploit TCF's film and television library. To win regulatory approval for the deal, Murdoch gave up his Australian citizenship and became a naturalized U.S. citizen on September 4, 1985. When the Metromedia deal closed on March 6, 1986, it was renamed Fox Television Stations Group; an executive team began to be recruited for Fox Broadcasting Company (Fox), which at that point only consisted of president Jamie Kellner and his secretary.

The launch of Fox took place through a staggered process. The network's first program, The Late Show with Joan Rivers, debuted on October 6, 1986, amid plans to unveil their first night of prime time programming on April 5, 1987. At the same time, TCF chairman Barry Diller openly floated the idea of Fox bidding against ABC for the rights to Monday Night Football, which proved unsuccessful. Encountering poor ratings and negative critical reviews, Joan Rivers left The Late Show on May 15, 1987; while briefly encountering success with guest host Arsenio Hall, Fox replaced Late Show with The Wilton North Report, which was cancelled after 21 episodes.

Fox was ridiculed by critics and scorned by Big Three network executives, which believed that, like previous fourth network attempts, it would be limited by being mostly on UHF stations. NBC entertainment president Brandon Tartikoff dismissively nicknamed Fox "the coat hanger network," implying that viewers would need to attach wire hangers (often used as a free alternative to set-top loop antennas used to receive UHF signals) to their television sets to view the network's shows. NBC head Grant Tinker declared, "I will never put a fourth column on my schedule board. There will only be three." Indeed, just two years into its existence, the network was already struggling, and Fox executives considered pulling the plug on the network. By 1990, however, Fox cracked the top 30 in the Nielsen ratings through the surprise success of The Simpsons (an animated series spun off from The Tracey Ullman Show, one of the network's initial series), which became the first series from a fourth network to enter the top 30 since the demise of DuMont more than 30 years earlier.

By then, Fox did have some advantages that DuMont did not have back in the 1950s. During its first few years, Fox programmed just under the number of hours to be legally considered a network by the FCC (by carrying only two hours of programming a few nights a week, expanding to additional nights before eventually filling all seven nights in 1993), allowing it to make money and grow in ways that the established networks were prohibited from doing. News Corporation also had more resources and money to hire and retain programming and talent than DuMont. In addition, the expansion of cable television in the 1980s and 1990s allowed more viewers to receive UHF stations clearly (along with local VHF stations), through cable systems, without having to struggle with either over-the-air antennas or television sets with limited channel tuners to receive them. The Foxnet cable channel began operations in June 1991 to provide Fox's programming to smaller markets that were not served by an over-the-air Fox affiliate or one of the few superstations that carried the network. Boosted by successful shows like Married... with Children, 21 Jump Street, COPS, Beverly Hills, 90210, In Living Color, Martin, Melrose Place, Living Single and The X-Files (all appealing to the highly coveted and lucrative 18-49 demographic), Fox proved profitable by the 1990s. Finally, in December 1993, Fox hit a major milestone when it won the National Football Conference (NFC) rights to NFL football games from CBS, a move that by all accounts firmly established itself as the fourth major television network. Soon afterward, Fox convinced several affiliates of the other networks (CBS, NBC, and ABC) to switch to Fox.

The nucleus of Fox centered around the former Metromedia, a company born from the former DuMont Television Network. Indeed, Fox's flagship is WNYW, the former WABD. Due to these factors, DuMont veteran radio programmer Clarke Ingram—who researched the history of DuMont and early UHF broadcasting—surmised that Fox was actually DuMont "rising from the ashes", or at the very least a linear descendant of DuMont.

== Additional networks ==
With the success of Fox, several other media companies started to enter the broadcasting world in the 1990s to create an additional commercial broadcast network that would allow a station to brand itself better and to stand out amongst the increasing number of television channels.

=== Fifth network attempts ===
- The Star Television Network (Star) proposed in 1987, launched in September 1990 with a lineup consisting primarily of classic television series; it failed by January 1991.
- The Premier Program Service (PPS) was proposed by Universal Pictures parent MCA Inc. and Paramount Communications in 1989, with stations owned by Paramount's TVX Broadcast Group and MCA's WWOR-TV as charter outlets. With a proposed January 1991 launch, PPS was an outgrowth of a joint venture, Premiere Advertiser Sales, that handled advertising for syndicated programs from both studios. MCA and Paramount approached other Fox affiliates in early 1990 as possible PPS affiliates; after Fox objected to these solicitations, the plans for PPS were abandoned.
- The BHC Communications subsidiary of Chris-Craft Industries and Warner Bros. Domestic Television Distribution subsidiary of Warner Bros. jointly launched the Prime Time Entertainment Network (PTEN), a consortium created in attempt at creating a new "fifth network," in September 1993. Additional program services included the Spelling Premiere Network (headed by television producer Aaron Spelling), The Disney Afternoon and MCA/Universal's Action Pack and Universal Family Network. All American Television also considered launching a first-run movie network of 22 made-for-TV movies.
- Warner Bros. partnered with Tribune Broadcasting to create The WB Television Network (The WB), which launched with a limited schedule in January 1995.
- Chris-Craft Industries subsidiary United Television partnered with Viacom subsidiary Paramount, through its television production arm Paramount Television, to form the United Paramount Network (UPN), launching in January 1995 with a limited primetime lineup (like The WB), with stations owned by Chris-Craft subsidiary United Television and Viacom subsidiary Paramount Stations Group (formerly TVX Broadcast Group) as the core affiliate base.
- The WB and UPN agreed to both dissolve on January 24, 2006, with The CW Television Network (The CW) launched in their place. The new "fifth network" was jointly owned by CBS Corporation & Warner Bros.; "CW" being derived from CBS and Warner. The CW cherry-picked their affiliate base from the best-performing UPN and WB affiliates, excluding Fox-owned UPN affiliates (the majority of these being the former United Television group) entirely.

NOTE: Despite the multitude of attempts at both a "fifth" TV network and a "major" TV network, none of them would achieve the "major" network status that Fox accomplished, mostly due to ratings & viewership issues.

=== Sixth network attempts ===
- Fox established MyNetworkTV as a replacement TV network for their former UPN outlets and other stations bypassed by The CW. Initially operating as a network, MyNetworkTV was downgraded to a syndication service in 2009.

NOTE: Even before MyNetworkTV's switch from network to broadcast syndication in 2009, it never managed to achieve the same "major" status that its corporate sister, Fox, accomplished.

=== Other network attempts ===
- Paxson Communications launched Pax TV (stylized as "PAX") on August 31, 1998, with a "family-friendly" focus of high-profile off-network reruns and some first-run programming. Paxson developed the network after a Supreme Court decision affirming the FCC's "must-carry" rules that benefitted Paxson's existing chain of UHF stations, all of which served as PAX's core. In 2005, PAX would rebrand as "i:Independent Television" (stylized as i), becoming a broadcast platform for programming producers, and then to Ion Television in 2007, becoming more of a mainstream syndication service, and then simply to Ion in the early 2020s. Upon its acquisition by E. W. Scripps Company, it would start introducing original programming in the form of sports, provided through Scripps's sports division, Scripps Sports, that had been launched back in 2022.
- Channel America launched in 1988 as a program service specializing in public domain content, centered on low-power stations.
- In March 1998, USA Broadcasting—the former owned-stations division of HSN—announced the launch of "CityVision", developed by Barry Diller as a hyperlocal independent format, and heavily-influenced by the format used by CITY-TV in Toronto (and moreso, that station's sister broadcast television properties that became charter stations of Citytv, when CHUM Limited expanded the format to other Canadian markets as a television system in 2002). WAMI in Miami, Florida, was the first CityVision station, and the concept also launched in the Atlanta, Boston, and Dallas–Fort Worth markets. CityVision failed to take off in the markets it was launched in, and after USA Broadcasting registered losses of $62 million in 2000, Diller sold the station group to Univision for $1.1 billion.

Additional networks were formed with increasing frequency immediately before and especially following the digital television transition, which gave stations the ability to multiplex their broadcast signals by adding subchannels, many of which since 2009 are being used to host networks focusing less or not at all on original content and relying mainly on programming acquired by various distributors (particularly classic series and feature films that are no longer being picked up by many cable networks).
