= SFM Entertainment =

American television syndicator

SFM Entertainment LLC
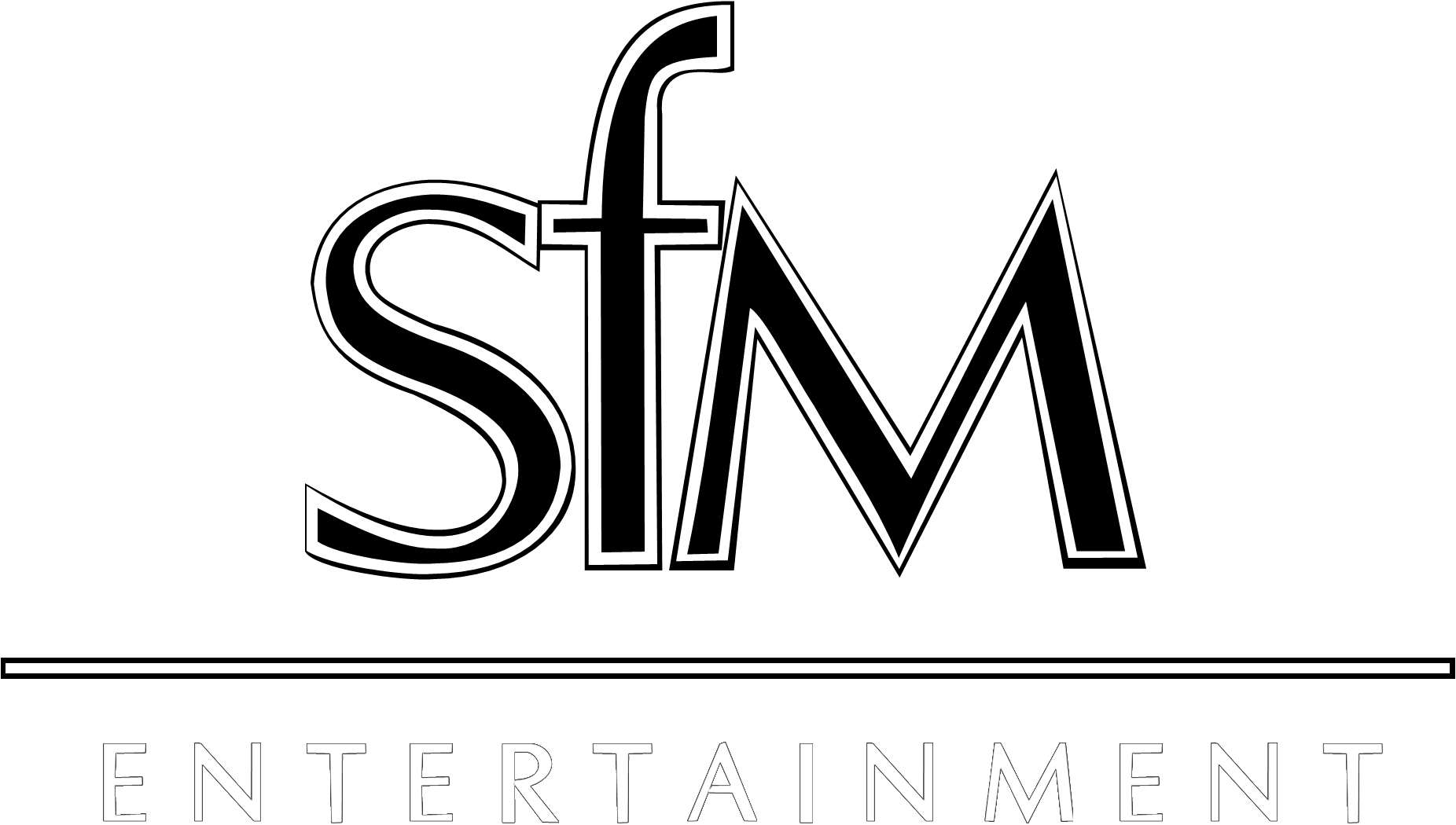
- Logo used since 1977
- Type: Private
- Industry: Television syndication Licensing
- Founded: 1975
- Founder: Walter Staab; Robert Frank; Stanley Moger
- Fate: Former parent company SFM Media Corporation acquired by Havas in 1998
- Headquarters: Rye Brook, New York
- Key people: Stanley Moger, CEO; Michael Maizes, SVP, Counsel, CFO
- Products: TV shows
- Services: Ad hoc TV networks
- Owner: Stanley Moger
- Parent: SFM Media Corporation (1969-1998)
- Divisions: SFM Holiday Network
- Website: sfment.com

SFM Entertainment LLC is an American television syndicator, film distributor, and licensing firm. It was originally a division of SFM Media Corporation. SFM Entertainment is known for setting up 'occasional' networks. The name is derived from the initials of the company's founders: Walter Staab, Robert Frank, and Stanley Moger.

== History ==
SFM Media Service Corporation was founded on September 29, 1969 as an independent advertising agency by Stanley Moger, Bob Frank and Walt Staab. The company started SFM Entertainment (SFME) to enter the strip-programming business. SFME's first syndicated program was The Mickey Mouse Club.

During the winter of 1976-77, SFM Media Service assisted Mobil Oil in running and launching the Mobil Showcase Network. This led to three additional companies approaching SFM on setting up their own 'occasional' networks. In 1978, SFM launched its own network, SFM Holiday Network. SFM subsequently launched the General Foods Golden Showcase Network in 1980. In 1983, SFM worked with Del Monte Foods to form an ad hoc TV network to broadcast the special Believe You Can . . . And You Can! over 100 stations on April 21, 1983 at 8 PM EST.

In 1994, SFM started up a sports marketing unit in its media services division with the hiring of Jerry Solomon as executive vice president.

In 1998, media holding company Havas purchased SFM Media Corporation, whose SFM Entertainment division was excluded from the sale.

== Shows distributed by SFM ==
Some shows distributed by SFM (past or present) include:

- The Adventures of Rin Tin Tin
- Jayce and the Wheeled Warriors
- The Mickey Mouse Club (the 1977-1978 version and the 1975-1977 syndication of the black-and-white original series)
- The Flip Wilson Show
- Rowan & Martin's Laugh-In
- The Smothers Brothers Show
- The Adventures of Jim Bowie
- The Danny Thomas Show
- The Real McCoys
- The West Point Story (with MGM Television)
- The Life and Legend of Wyatt Earp (1955–1961)
- the AFI 100 Years... series of TV specials
- Zoobilee Zoo (with DIC Entertainment) live action pre-school program
- Care Bears (syndicated version from 1988)
- Rainbow Brite
- Grandma Got Run Over by a Reindeer
- Make Room for Daddy
- The Joey Bishop Show
- Death Valley Days
- Mister Peepers
- Help! I'm a Fish
- The Doctors
- Edward the Seventh (British miniseries distributed in U.S. in 1979)
- Deal (a 1978 behind-the-scenes look at Let's Make a Deal)
- Good Morning World
- Lotsa Luck
- Roseanne (produced by Carsey-Werner Productions)
- The Jerry Lewis Show (1967–1969 NBC series; sketches edited from original hour-long shows into half-hour reruns)
- The Toys That Rescued Christmas (2004)
- Superstars
  - Battle of the Network Stars
  - Female Superstars
- SFM I movie and documentary package
  - The Indomitable Teddy Roosevelt
  - Pinocchio in Outer Space
- Stamp of Greatness – weekly half-hour program profile those on the postage stamps
- Directions – weekly half-hour program on fashion
- The George Steinbrenner Show – half-hour weekly sports series moderated by Steinbrenner as two well-known sports figures debate sports related issue in front of an audience
- Faces of Love – first-run anthology series from major authors feature romance
- The Hugga Bunch – 5-part limited series
- The Texas 150th Birthday Celebration – 3-hour live special featuring top Texan stars mark the 150th anniversary of Texas
- The March of Time – award-winning British documentary series
- The Dione Lucas Cooking Show

== See also ==
- Fourth television network
- Mobil Showcase Network
- Operation Prime Time
