= Universal Pictures Debut Network =

American syndicated movie package

- Network: Syndication
- Launched: 1985
- Closed: 1991
- Country of origin: United States
- Owner: MCA TV
- Key people: Doug Paul (previews announcer); Harry Tatelman (special projects veep)
- Sister network: Hollywood Premiere Network
- Format: 1 day
- Running time: 95 minutes
- Original language: English
- Official website: Official website

The Universal Pictures Debut Network, or simply the Debut Network, was a syndicated movie package that MCA Television sold to independent stations. The service reached agreements with ten stations in larger American markets such as New York City, Los Angeles and Chicago by late 1984. The Debut Network was a precursor of sorts to the Action Pack, which was also a syndicated package created by Universal Television.

== Background ==
MCA TV (also known as MCA Television Enterprises) was founded in 1951, several years before parent MCA's purchase of American Decca (in 1959) and Universal Pictures (in 1962). For more than four decades, it was one of the most active syndicators of television programming. During the 1980s, it distributed both off-network reruns of shows like Kate & Allie and Gimme a Break!, as well as original syndication product like the animated action series Bionic Six (co-produced with TMS Entertainment), The Morton Downey Jr. Show (taped at then-MCA owned WWOR-TV in Secaucus, NJ), The Munsters Today (a revival of the Universal sitcom), and Pictionary, based on the popular board game.

MCA Television attempted several branded TV packages in 1985 to 2001 including an ad hoc film network, a broadcast network and a few syndicated programming blocks. The company launched the Universal Pictures Debut Network, an ad hoc film network with plans to launch in two stages beginning in September 1985.

MCA's motivation for launching the Debut Network was to attempt to make up for lost revenue from the "big three networks", who were at the time, preferring cheaper made for TV movies. Independent stations were specifically targeted since they needed many more hours to fill. MCA set up a barter agreement, wherein each movie featured on the Debut Network would be edited down to 95 minutes, including the credits. (A notable exception was Rear Window, which, with commercials, was given a 2.5 hour block instead of the normal 2 hour block.) Of the 22 minutes for commercials, MCA received 10 1/2, with the local outlets keeping 11 1/2 minutes. The remaining three minutes would be devoted to promotion spots for one thing or another.

=== The end of the Debut Network ===
MCA TV and Paramount Domestic Television had formed Premier Advertiser Sales, a joint venture created for the sale of advertising for their existing syndicated programs in September 1989. As a possible outgrowth of this sales joint venture, MCA and Paramount began plans for a new network, Premier Program Service. When Premier Program Service halted, MCA teamed up with Chris-Craft TV for a syndicated programming block, Hollywood Premiere Network, that only lasted for the 1990–1991 season. The Universal Family Network syndicated programming block was launched by the company in the fall of 1993 with a single weekly half hour show, Exosquad, as a counter to The Disney Afternoon.

== List of films featured ==
Beginning in September 1985, affiliated Debut Network stations could program 24 features from the Universal Pictures library on an advertiser supported basis. One feature would debut each month over the course of at least two years, and each month, the stations would be allowed to air the movie twice; usually once in prime time and a rerun in late night hours. At the end of their barter run, these features would revert to the Debut Network stations for additional cash runs with no interim pay cable window.

Frequently, the versions prepared for broadcast would contain alternate takes and scenes originally cut from the theatrical edits, usually to replace footage deemed unsuitable for television. These new edits were prepared on standard definition video, and sent to TV stations via satellite. However, when the films were resent to the affiliated stations for their cash runs, in most instances, the original theatrical versions were provided instead of the Debut Network recuts, in 16mm prints or on 1 inch videotape, and the stations would edit the films as they chose for the individual standards of their markets.

In 1988, the movie network broadcast a special edition of Dune as a two-night event, with additional footage not included in the film's original release.

- Amazon Women on the Moon
- Batteries Not Included
- The Best of Times
- Born in East L.A.
- Brazil
- The Breakfast Club
- Brewster's Millions
- Cat People
- Cloak & Dagger
- Conan the Destroyer
- The Conqueror
- Crackers
- Cry Freedom
- D.C. Cab
- Doctor Detroit
- Dune
- Eddie Macon's Run
- Firestarter
- Fletch
- Ghost Story
- Going Berserk
- Gotcha!
- The Great Outdoors
- Halloween II
- Halloween III: Season of the Witch
- Hard to Hold
- Harry and the Hendersons
- Howard the Duck
- Iceman
- Legend
- A Little Sex
- The Lonely Guy
- The Man Who Knew Too Much
- The Serpent and the Rainbow
- Mask
- Prince of Darkness
- Private School
- Raggedy Man
- Rear Window
- The River
- Scarface
- Sixteen Candles
- The Sword and the Sorcerer
- Tank
- They Live
- Three O'Clock High
- Vertigo
- Weird Science
- Where the Buffalo Roam

=== 1985 television edit of Halloween II (1981) ===
An alternate version of Halloween II (sometimes referred to as 'The Television Cut') has aired on network television since the early 1980s, with most of the graphic violence and blood edited out and many minor additional scenes added, while others are removed. This cut of the film was released in 2012 by Scream Factory on their Collector's Edition Blu-ray disc, and again in 2014 as a standalone DVD accompanying the "Complete Collection" Deluxe Edition Blu-ray set, which features entire series.

The television cut runs approximately 92 minutes, roughly one minute less than the theatrical version. There are many edits such as the murder of Dr. Mixter is presumed to still happen, but remains off camera, as does Janet's, although dialogue indicates she might have gone home at the end of her shift instead of being killed. The scene where Michael stalks Alice is recut to imply that he attacks and kills her neighbor Mrs. Elrod instead. Jimmy's discovery of Mrs. Alves dead and his subsequent slipping in the pool of blood has been significantly shortened (or removed altogether in some prints) and moved just prior to the explosion which kills Myers and Loomis. Jill's stabbing is less graphic, and a moan from the ground implies she might have survived it. Also added are scenes of Michael cutting the power (this explains the dark setting throughout the latter half of the film) and a power generator kicking in. There is also extra dialogue between Laurie and Jimmy, Laurie and Mrs. Alves, Janet and Karen, Karen and Mr. Garrett, Bud and Karen, Jill and Jimmy, etc.

Another notable difference is the killing of the Marshall. In the theatrical version his throat is slit, while in the TV version it is softened, with Michael grabbing him and stabbing him from behind (with no detail shown). While the theatrical version ends with the deaths of Michael Myers and Dr. Loomis and leaves the audience in a gray area as to whether Jimmy survives, the television cut features an extended ending showing Jimmy alive (with a bandaged head wound from his slip) in the ambulance with Laurie Strode. They hold hands and Laurie says, "We made it."

=== 1988 television edit of Dune (1984) ===
The rough cut of Dune, without post-production effects, ran over four hours long but director David Lynch's intended cut of the film (as reflected in the seventh and final draft of the script) was almost three hours long. Universal and the film's financiers expected a standard, two-hour cut of the film. Dino De Laurentiis, his daughter Raffaella and Lynch excised numerous scenes, filmed new scenes that simplified or concentrated plot elements and added voice-over narrations, plus a new introduction by Virginia Madsen. Contrary to rumor, Lynch made no other version besides the theatrical cut.

As previously mentioned, a television version was aired in 1988 in two parts totaling 186 minutes including a "What happened last night" recap and second credit roll. Lynch disavowed this version and had his name removed from the credits, Alan Smithee being credited instead. This version (without recap and second credit roll) has occasionally been released on DVD as Dune: Extended Edition. Several longer versions have been spliced together. Although Universal has approached Lynch for a possible director's cut, Lynch has declined every offer and prefers not to discuss Dune in interviews.

In 1992, KTVU, pieced together a hybrid edit of the two previous versions for broadcast in the San Francisco Bay Area. It is essentially the television version with all the violence of the theatrical version reincorporated into the film, along with many of the "fabricated" shots objected to by Lynch removed.

=== 1989 syndication version of Brazil (1985) ===
In 1985, a much-publicized war emerged between director Terry Gilliam and Universal's then-COO Sid Sheinberg over the final cut of Brazil for the film's North American release. Against Gilliam's wishes, Sheinberg wanted to cut the film from Gilliam's preferred 142 minute cut to 93 minutes and modify the dark sci-fi satire into an uplifting romance, complete with a happy ending. After Gilliam created an ambitious campaign to wrestle the film away from Sheinberg, including clandestine screenings of his preferred cut, which led to the Los Angeles Film Critics Association awarding the film Best Picture and Best Director, Sheinberg backed down and Universal released a "compromised" cut running 131 minutes and featuring a few of the changes suggested by Sheinberg while remaining faithful to Gilliam's vision.

In January 1989, Universal released a cut of Brazil for airing on the Debut Network. Running 93 minutes, it was a heavily modified version that remained true to Sheinberg's preferred cut of the film, and was subsequently given the nickname "The Love Conquers All Cut." How this version managed to get released remains a mystery; Gilliam said that Universal asked him to make an edited-for-television cut of the film and he refused. In an interview with the Los Angeles Times, Gilliam sarcastically complimented Sheinberg for "[getting] a chance to break into TV," but was angry that Universal didn't take his name off the TV cut and also criticized advertisements for the Debut Network premiere of Brazil which used the same critical praise that was given to his version. In an interview with Jack Matthews in an updated version of his book The Battle of Brazil, Sheinberg claimed he had no idea how his cut leaked out, and said that he wasn't the one who ordered that cut to be released. In 1996, The Criterion Collection released a box set of Brazil that included Gilliam's preferred 142-minute version of the film as well as the "Love Conquers All" cut of the movie.

== List of stations ==
City	Station
Anchorage	KYUR 13
Atlanta	WGNX 46
Baltimore	WBFF 45 WNUV 54
Beaumont	KBMT 12
Boston	WHLL 27
Buffalo	WUTV 29
Charleston	WVAH 23
Chicago	WGN 9
Cincinnati	WXIX 19
Cleveland	WEWS 5
Columbus	WTTE 28
Corpus Christi	KIII 3
Dallas-Ft. Worth	KTVT 11
Davenport	KLJB 18
Denver	KWGN 2
Des Moines	KDSM 17
Detroit	WKBD 50
Fairbanks	KATN 2
Fargo	KVRR 15
Flint	WSMH 66
Fort Wayne	WFFT 55
Greenville	WHNS 21
Greeneville	WEMT 39
Hardeeville	WTGS 28
Harlingen	KGBT 4
Houston	KTXH 20
Indianapolis	WXIN 59
Kansas City	KSHB 41
Los Angeles	KTLA 5
Miami	WBFS 33
Minneapolis	KITN 29
New York	WPIX 11
New Orleans	WGNO 26
Oakland	KTVU 2
Omaha	KPTM 42
Orlando	WOFL 35
Peoria	WHOI 19
Philadelphia	WPHL 17
Pittsburgh	WPGH 53
Plattsburgh	WPTZ 5
Portland	KPTV 12
Rawlins	KFNR 11
Richmond	WRLH 35
Scranton	WOLF 38
Sioux City	KCAN 8
Spokane	KAYU 28
Springfield	KOLR 10
Tacoma	KCPQ 13
Tampa	WFTS 28
Tucson	KMSB 11
Washington, D.C.	WDCA 20; WTTG 5
Waterbury	WTXX 20
West Palm Beach	WFLX 29
York	WPMT 43

By October 1988, the Debut Network was affiliated with at least 132 stations.

== Ratings ==
For the week ending on October 16, 1988, the Debut Network's movie earned a 14.1 rating on just 132 stations. From September 4, 1988 through January 1, 1989, the Premiere Network earned a 10.9 rating. This placed it at fourth place among the top barter series for the first 16 weeks of the 1988–89 United States television season. In June 1990, the Debut Network was ranked in fifth place among the ten highest-rated syndicated programs according to Nielsen.

== See also ==
- List of Universal Television programs
- Fourth television network
