= Royal Dano =

American actor (1922–1994)

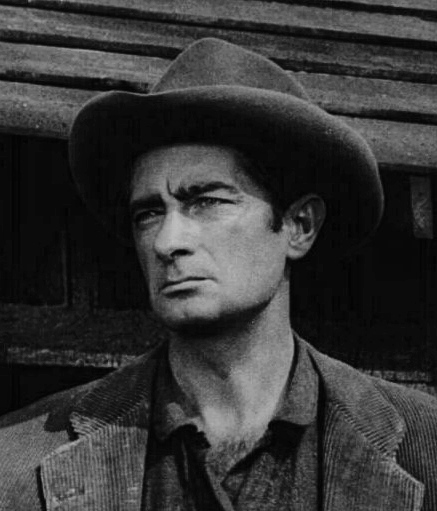
- Dano in The Adventures of Huckleberry Finn (1960)
- Born: Royal Edward Dano; November 16, 1922; New York City, U.S.
- Died: May 15, 1994 (aged 71); Santa Monica, California, U.S.
- Resting place: Los Angeles National Cemetery
- Education: New York University
- Occupation: Actor
- Years active: 1947–1993
- Spouse: Peggy Ranck
- Children: 2
- Relatives: Hutch Dano (grandson)

Royal Edward Dano Sr. (November 16, 1922 – May 15, 1994) was an American actor whose career spanned 46 years. He is perhaps best known for playing cowboys, villains, and Abraham Lincoln. Dano also provided the voice of the Audio-Animatronic Lincoln for Walt Disney's Great Moments with Mr. Lincoln attraction at the 1964 New York World's Fair (brought to Disneyland in 1965), as well as Lincoln's voice at the "Hall of Presidents" attraction at Disney's Magic Kingdom in 1971.

== Early life ==
Dano was born in New York City on November 16, 1922, the eldest of three siblings born to Mary Josephine (née O'Connor), an Irish immigrant, and Caleb Edward Dano, a printer for newspapers. In World War II he entertained troops as a sergeant in the 44th Special Service Provisional Company.

== Career ==
Dano appeared as McSnoyd the leprechaun in the stage show Barnaby and Mr. O'Malley, based on the comic strip by Crockett Johnson. McSnoyd appears to the audience only as a blinking light on a large mushroom, so only his voice is heard. However, at the conclusion of the show Dano joined the rest of the cast, wearing a leprechaun costume.

Dano is remembered for his supporting roles in a number of 1950s western and mystery films. The chance for the breakout role of a lifetime escaped him in the theatrical release of The Red Badge of Courage. Dano, cast as The Tattered Man, delivered such a disturbing performance in his death scene, according to director John Huston, that the initial test audience left the theater in droves, i.e., "I've never seen so many people get up and leave the theater ... they liked no part of it." The death scene was lent a human touch by Dano, and in 1951, war-weary Americans rejected it (Huston: "... [the audience rejection] was a pretty sickening event."). Red Badge was immediately recut, and the death scene was removed. It is long believed, and as early as Huston commenting in an interview in 1972, the scene has been lost ("I doubt very much, whether the scene still exists.").

He often worked with Anthony Mann and James Stewart. Over the years, Dano made many television appearances, often in bizarre, macabre roles. Dano was also a frequent guest star on Gunsmoke, with a total of thirteen appearances.

Dano was the voice of Abraham Lincoln for Walt Disney's Great Moments with Mr. Lincoln attraction, first presented at the 1964 New York World's Fair. Disney personally selected Dano, because he felt the actor came closest to the historical descriptions of Lincoln's voice. Great Moments with Mr. Lincoln was moved to Disneyland in 1965, and Dano's vocals continued to be a part of the attraction until 2001. In 1971, his voice was also used for a revised Lincoln speech in the new "Hall of Presidents" attraction at Magic Kingdom in Florida, which ran to 1993.

In 2009, Dano's vocals were returned to Great Moments with Mr. Lincoln at Disneyland in an updated version of the show.

== Personal life and death ==
Dano was married to Peggy Ranck and together they had two sons, Rick and Royal Jr. (1946–1994). Through his son Rick, he is the grandfather of actor Hutch Dano.

He died of pulmonary fibrosis on May 15, 1994, in Santa Monica, California.

== Selected filmography ==
- Undercover Girl (1950) as The Moocher
- Under the Gun (1951) as Sam Nugent
- The Red Badge of Courage (1951) as The Tattered Soldier
- Flame of Araby (1951) as Basra
- Bend of the River (1952) as Long Tom
- Carrie (1952) as Captain (uncredited)
- Johnny Guitar (1954) as Corey
- The Far Country (1954) as Luke
- The Trouble with Harry (1955) as Deputy Sheriff Calvin Wiggs
- Gunsmoke (1955-1971, TV Series) as Henry Mather / Watney / Gideon Hale / Jessup / Jefferson Dooley / Rory Luken / Lambert Haggen / Praylie / Bender / Seth Tandy / Obie Tater
- Tribute to a Bad Man (1956) as Abe
- Moby Dick (1956) as 'Elijah'
- Santiago (1956) as Lobo
- Tension at Table Rock (1956) as Harry Jameson
- Crime of Passion (1957) as Police Captain Charlie Alidos
- All Mine to Give (1957) as Howard Tyler
- Father Knows Best (1957, TV Series) as Sageman
- Trooper Hook (1957) as Mr. Trude, Stage Driver
- Man in the Shadow (1957) as Aiken Clay
- The Millionaire (1957, TV Series) as Hap Connolly
- Alfred Hitchcock Presents (1957) (Season 2 Episode 17: "My Brother, Richard") as Martin Ross
- The Restless Gun (1957) (Episode "Cheyenne Express") as Wilbur English
- Saddle the Wind (1958) as Clay Ellison
- Handle with Care (1958) as Al Lees
- Man of the West (1958) as Trout
- Never Steal Anything Small (1959) as Words Cannon
- These Thousand Hills (1959) as Ike Carmichael
- The Boy and the Bridge (1959) as Evangelist
- Face of Fire (1959) as Jake Winter
- Wanted Dead or Alive (1959, TV Series) as Charlie Wright
- Hound-Dog Man (1959) as Fiddling Tom Waller
- Alfred Hitchcock Presents (1960) (Season 5 Episode 33: "Party Line") as Mr. Atkins
- Route 66 (1961, TV Series, episode "Most Vanquished, Most Victorious") as Doctor
- Wagon Train (1959-1963, TV Series) as John Bouchette / Boone Caulder
- The Rifleman (1959-1962, TV Series) as Reverend Jamison / Able 'Abe' Lincoln / Aaron Wingate / Jonas Epps / Frank Blandon
- The Rebel (ABC-TV, 1959–1961, TV Series) as Ben Crowe / Amos Cooper
- The Adventures of Huckleberry Finn (1960) as Sheriff Harlan
- Cimarron (1960) as Ike Howes (photographer)
- Have Gun – Will Travel (1960) as Curley Ashburne
- Tate (1960) Pilot Episode
- Tales of Wells Fargo (1960-1962, TV Series) as Robert Mapes / Cole Younger
- Posse from Hell (1961) as Uncle Billy
- King of Kings (1961) as Peter
- Mister Magoo's Christmas Carol (animated TV special) (1962, TV Movie) as Marley's Ghost (voice)
- Rawhide (1962-1965, TV Series) as Sam Wentworth / Mr. Teisner / Jeb Newton / Monty Fox
- The Virginian (1962-1966, TV Series) as Uncle Dell Benton / Daniels / Faraway McPhail / Dan Molder
- Bonanza (NBC-TV, 1962–1967, TV Series) as Matt Jeffers / Hank Penn / Jason Ganther
- The Dakotas (ABC, 1963, TV Series) as Reverend Walter Wyman
- Savage Sam (1963) as Pack Underwood (uncredited)
- Mr. Novak (NBC-TV, 1963, TV Series) as Mr. Metcalfe
- The Travels of Jaimie McPheeters (ABC-TV, 1964, TV Series) as James Weston
- 7 Faces of Dr. Lao (1964) as Carey
- The Alfred Hitchcock Hour (1964, TV Series) (Season 3 Episode 2: "Change of Address") as Mr. Miley
- The Fugitive (1964, TV Series, episode "When the Bough Breaks") as Preacher
- Death Valley Days (1965-1970, TV Series) as Andrew Bonney / Hannibal McCall / Aaron Winters / Henderson Lewelling
- Lost in Space (1966, TV Series, episode: 27, "The Lost Civilization") as Major Domo
- Gunpoint (1966) as Ode
- Daniel Boone (NBC-TV, 1966–1967, TV Series) as John Maddox / Matty Brenner
- The Big Valley (1966-1969, TV Series) as Ezra / The Vet / Jesse Bleeck / Rufus Morton
- Welcome to Hard Times (1967) as John Bear
- The Last Challenge (1967) as Pretty Horse
- Day of the Evil Gun (1968) as Dr. Eli Prather
- If He Hollers, Let Him Go! (1968) as Carl Blair
- Death of a Gunfighter (1969) as Arch Brandt
- The Undefeated (1969) as Major Sanders, CSA (one-armed major)
- Hawaii Five-O (1970, TV Series) as Hody Linquist
- Run, Simon, Run (1970, TV Movie) as Sheriff Tacksberry
- Skin Game (1971) as John Brown (abolitionist)
- The Culpepper Cattle Co. (1972) as Cattle Rustler
- The Great Northfield, Minnesota Raid (1972) as Gustavson
- Moon of the Wolf (1972, TV Movie) as Tom Sr.
- Emergency! (1972-1976, TV Series) as Sam / Hallucinating Man
- Kung Fu (1973, TV Series) as Henry Skowrin
- Ace Eli and Rodger of the Skies (1973) as Jake
- Messiah of Evil (1973) as Joseph Lang
- Cahill U.S. Marshal (1973) as MacDonald, hermit who sells Cahill the mule
- Electra Glide in Blue (1973) as Coroner
- Planet of the Apes (1974, TV Series) as Farrow
- Big Bad Mama (1974) as Reverend Johnson
- Adam-12 (1975, TV Series) as Walter Covey
- The Wild Party (1975) as Tex
- Huckleberry Finn (1975, TV Movie) as Mark Twain
- Capone (1975) as Anton J. Cermak
- The Outlaw Josey Wales (1976) as Ten Spot
- Drum (1976) as Zeke Montgomery
- The Killer Inside Me (1976) as Father
- Hughes and Harlow: Angels in Hell (1977) as Will Hays
- Bad Georgia Road (1977) as Arthur Pennyrich
- Quincy, M.E. (1977, TV Series) as Dr. Williams / Holsang
- The One Man Jury (1978) as Bartender
- In Search of Historic Jesus (1979, Documentary) as Prophet #1
- The Last Ride of the Dalton Gang (1979, TV Movie) as Pa Dalton
- Little House on the Prairie (1979-1981, TV Series) as Mr. Hector Webb / Harold
- Take This Job and Shove It (1981) as Beeber
- Hammett (1982) as Pops
- Something Wicked This Way Comes (1983) as Tom Fury
- The Right Stuff (1983) as Minister
- Teachers (1984) as Ditto Stiles
- Cocaine Wars (1985) as Bailey
- Amazing Stories (1986, TV Series) as Elmer Quick / Salvation Army Officer
- Red Headed Stranger (1986) as Larn Claver
- House II: The Second Story (1987) as Gramps
- Date with an Angel (1987) as Treating Doctor in Hospital (uncredited)
- Once Upon a Texas Train (1988, TV Movie) as Nitro Jones
- Killer Klowns from Outer Space (1988) as Farmer Gene Green
- Ghoulies II (1988) as Uncle Ned
- Spaced Invaders (1990) — Wrenchmuller
- Twin Peaks (1990) as Judge Clinton Sternwood
- The Dark Half (1993) as Digger Holt (final film role)
