= SFM Holiday Network =

Occasional television network

- Type: 'Occasional' TV network
- Parent: SFM Entertainment
- Established: 1978; 48 years ago

The SFM Holiday Network was an 'occasional' network from SFM Media which aired on holiday weekends (such as the 4th of July, Christmas, etc.) from 1978 until 1991.

The network would usually clear 88% of the U.S.

== History ==
After the success of the Mobil Showcase Network, SFM Media launched its own occasional network, SFM Holiday Network in 1978. For 1982, 11 films were scheduled by the network. In 1983, the Network started its season in March with 150 stations.

== Format ==
Popcorn magnate Orville Redenbacher hosted the show (his company was a main sponsor of the Holiday Network), in special segments with his grandson. The theme song used for many of the SFM Holiday Network broadcasts, including the commercial "bumpers", was Johnny Pearson's "Heavy Action", which was also used as the instrumental theme for Monday Night Football.

== Programs ==
SFM would arrange for programming by giving part of the advertising to the movie companies, while the station would get about half the ad time. SFM would end up with 7.5 to 15 minutes of advertising time to sell for each 2 to 3 hour movie.

- The Four Horseman of the Apocalypse
- King of the Khyber Rifles (January 15–17, 1982)
- Friendly Persuasion (1956 film)
