= Night in Manhattan =

- Directed by: Herbert Moulton
- Starring: Glenn Ford
- Distributed by: Paramount Pictures
- Release date: July 2, 1937
- Running time: 10 minutes
- Country: United States
- Language: English

Night in Manhattan (1937) is a short musical film, starring Glenn Ford (in his first screen role) and directed by Herbert Moulton.

== Plot ==
A gentleman Emcee (Ford), is the host of a series of musical acts, making his professional debut, a tap dancer, two good singers and a dancer, which ends with a montage of life, in a Manhattan nightclub.

== Cast ==
Actor	Role
Glenn Ford	Emcee
Stanley Brown	Himself
Billy Daniel	Dancer
Dorothy Dayton	Herself
June Kilgour	Herself
