= Jerry Thorpe =

American film director

- Born: Richard Jerome Thorpe; August 29, 1926; Los Angeles, California
- Died: September 25, 2018 (aged 92); Santa Barbara, California, U.S.
- Burial place: Desert Memorial Park; Cathedral City, California, U.S.
- Occupations: Film director, television producer, writer
- Years active: 1956–1990
- Parent: Richard Thorpe

Richard Jerome Thorpe (August 29, 1926 – September 25, 2018) was an American television-and-film director and producer. Actor and director Richard Thorpe was his father.

Thorpe served as the executive producer of 33 episodes of The Untouchables (starring Robert Stack) during the series's second season (1960–61). Thorpe also served as executive producer of Harry O, the 1973-75 David Janssen TV series.

In the 1970s, he met writer William Blinn, and later formed a partnership with Blinn, along with Viacom and ABC to develop its own television properties.

Thorpe won an Emmy award for his work on an episode of Kung Fu. In 2003, a Golden Palm Star on the Palm Springs, California, Walk of Stars was dedicated to him and his father.

Thorpe died in Santa Barbara, California, at the age of 92 from natural causes. He was buried at Desert Memorial Park in Cathedral City, California.

== Filmography ==
- Colgate Theatre (TV series, episode "Adventures of a Model, 1958")
- The Venetian Affair (1966), starring Robert Vaughn
- Day of the Evil Gun (1968), starring Glenn Ford
- Lock, Stock, and Barrel (1971), a television movie
- A Question of Love (1978), a television movie
