= Thomas F. O'Neil =

American businessman

Thomas Francis O'Neil
- Born: April 18, 1915; Kansas City, Missouri, U.S.
- Died: March 14, 1998 (aged 82); Greenwich, Connecticut, U.S.
- Education: College of the Holy Cross (BA)
- Occupation: Businessman
- Spouse: Claire Miller
- Children: 9

Thomas F. O'Neil (1915–1998) was the chairman of RKO General studios who brought movies to television and experimented with an early coin-operated pay TV system.

== Early years ==
O'Neil was born in Kansas City, Missouri, on April 18, 1915. He graduated from College of the Holy Cross, where he was a star football player, in 1937. Beginning in 1941, he served five years in the United States Coast Guard.

== Career ==
O'Neil's career began with the General Tire and Rubber Company, which his father William F. O'Neil had founded. O'Neil was running the tire company's Boston office when he visited the offices of the Yankee Network, a radio network the company had invested in to regain radio advertising costs.

O'Neil was back from the war in the Pacific when he formed General Teleradio in 1948 by combining the Yankee Network with a station operating in a new medium. WNAC-TV's first telecasts went to exactly two small-screen television sets placed in the Jordan Marsh department store in Boston.

It was his television stations' need for programming that led O'Neil to start buying the broadcast rights to movies. Some Hollywood studios boycotted the venture for fear that giving away movies on television free would undermine their theater business, and O'Neil had to scramble to find titles, once paying the Bank of America $1.3 million for 30 titles in 1953.

Only interested in the broadcast rights to the movies for his stations, O'Neil started selling those rights to other TV outlets, a process that he called syndication.

O'Neil took General Teleradio into the motion picture studio business because of his constant need for new titles, and that quest took him into nonstop negotiating with Howard Hughes, the eccentric pilot and entrepreneur, for the purchase of RKO Radio Pictures, Inc.

According to legend, O'Neil haggled with Hughes in taxicabs while driving around Central Park, on cross-country flights flown by Hughes and in Las Vegas until in 1954 the duo signed a contract in the men's room at the Beverly Hills Hotel, turning RKO Pictures over to General Teleradio for $25 million, or about $150 million at today's prices. O'Neil changed the studio's name to RKO Teleradio Pictures at first, then eventually to RKO General.

The studio library's hundreds of titles solved O'Neil's movie programming problems, and he began diversifying his company into regional airlines as well as resort hotels and Pepsi-Cola bottling franchises.

O'Neil retired from RKO General in 1985.

== Personal life ==
O'Neil married Claire McCahey, and they had nine children.
