= Peter Ford (actor) =

American actor

- Born: Peter Newton Ford; 5 February 1945 (age 81); Los Angeles, California, U.S.
- Occupations: Actor; singer
- Years active: 1970–present
- Spouse: Lynda Gunderson (m. 1970)
- Children: 3
- Parents: Glenn Ford (father); Eleanor Powell (mother)

Peter Newton Ford (born February 5, 1945) is an American retired actor, singer, and former President and Co-Founder of Blackoak Development Company.

== Early life ==
Ford was born in Los Angeles, California, the son of Canadian-American actor Glenn Ford and American actress-dancer Eleanor Powell. As a child, Ford's interest in rock and roll music inadvertently contributed to "Rock Around the Clock" being chosen as the title track for Blackboard Jungle. Ford graduated from Chadwick High School in Palos Verdes, California in 1962, received an Associate of Arts degree from Santa Monica College in 1966, and graduated, cum laude, from the University of Southern California in 1968 with a B.A. degree in English. While attending the University of Southern California, Ford met his future wife, Lynda Gundersen. Ford was accepted to the University of Southern California School of Law, but chose instead to work as an actor and singer.

== Career ==
=== Musical career ===
Originally under contract to Capitol Records, Ford was mentored by Nat "King" Cole. Later, recording for Philips Records the release of his singles, "Don't Keep It To Yourself"/"Blue Ribbons" which were noted in Billboard's Pop Spotlight's Top 60, resulting in the song's appearance on many teen music television shows of the era, including American Bandstand, Hullabaloo and Ninth Street West.

He eventually formed his own group, The Creations, which appeared in various local clubs, as well as the Whisky a Go Go in West Hollywood and the El Cortez Club in Las Vegas.

=== Acting ===
Ford also worked on nearly two dozen film projects as an actor and dialogue director. The first was Gilda where director Charles Vidor used Ford's photo to represent Johnny Farrell (Glenn's role in the film) as a child. Ford's first speaking role was in The Gazebo in 1959, co-starring Debbie Reynolds. He also appeared in Pocketful of Miracles, Dear Heart, Advance to the Rear, Fate is the Hunter, and The Rounders.

In the early 1970s, Ford began working at Fox and was cast as a series regular and dialogue director for Cade's County, which starred his father Glenn Ford, playing forensic lab deputy Pete Odom. After Cade's County ended, Ford joined the Photo Unit of the Los Angeles County Sheriff's Department as a Reserve Deputy, rising to the rank of Lieutenant before retiring in 1996.

=== Building ===
In the mid-1970s, Ford and his wife Lynda began remodeling and selling homes.

Ford's first major home building commission was for producer Walter Coblenz, producer of All the President's Men and The Onion Field. He took a partner into his company and formed Blackoak Development Company. Ford went on to build and remodel homes for many clients involved in the film and television industry: producer Steve Tisch, actress Mary Kay Place, producer Jerry Belson, super agent Jeff Berg, producer Don Simpson, writers Chuck Shyer and Nancy Meyers, actress Jo Beth Williams, health guru Richard Simmons, actress Sally Kellerman, and Blake Edwards and Julie Andrews.

In 1989, Ford took over the building company and operated it as a sole proprietorship until his retirement from building in 1996. Blackoak/Ford was a respected custom residential construction firm. His work has been published in architectural magazines throughout the world, most notably the Schnabel House, designed by architect Frank Gehry. It was noted by Architectural Digest as "one of the greatest houses of the 20th century".

== Personal life ==
Ford married Lynda Gunderson (b. 1946) in 1970.

Ford and Lynda have three children: Aubrey Newton Ford (b. 1977), Ryan Welsie Ford (b. 1984) and Eleanor Powell Ford (b. 1988).

=== Hobbies and interests ===
Ford is a student and collector of Native American culture who harbors an interest in genealogical research, with membership in the General Society of Mayflower Descendants, Society of Colonial Wars, Society of the Sons of the Revolution, The Baronial Order of the Magna Charta, the Order of the Crusades (with 11 Crusaders in his direct line), the Crown of Charlemagne (Charlemagne is Ford's 38th Great Grandfather) and The Order of Founders and Patriots of America.

He also collects movie memorabilia from Hollywood's Golden Age, and maintains The Glenn Ford and Eleanor Powell Library and Archives and as a writer, he has published numerous articles. Ford's various interests led him to KIEV-AM 870 radio, where for nearly three years in the late 1990s he hosted a weekly nighttime political talk show in Los Angeles, The Peter Ford Show.

Ford is also the author of Glenn Ford: A Life, a biography of his father published by the University of Wisconsin Press.

Ford and his wife Lynda currently reside in Bigfork, Montana.
