= Day of the Evil Gun =

1968 film by Jerry Thorpe

- Theatrical release poster
- Directed by: Jerry Thorpe
- Written by: Charles Marquis Warren
- Produced by: Jerry Thorpe
- Starring: Glenn Ford; Arthur Kennedy
- Cinematography: W. Wallace Kelley
- Edited by: Alex Beaton
- Music by: Jeff Alexander
- Color process: Metrocolor
- Production company: Metro-Goldwyn-Mayer
- Distributed by: Metro-Goldwyn-Mayer
- Release date: March 1, 1968
- Running time: 95 minutes
- Country: United States
- Language: English

Day of the Evil Gun is a 1968 American traditional Western starring Glenn Ford, Arthur Kennedy, and Dean Jagger. It was directed by Jerry Thorpe and written by Charles Marquis Warren.

Supporting actors included John Anderson, Paul Fix, Nico Minardos, Harry Dean Stanton, Royal Dano, and James Griffith. Mexican actress Pilar Pellicer had a supporting role.

== Plot ==
Angie Warfield and her two children are kidnapped by Apaches. Lorn Warfield, who had been away a long time, sets out to rescue his family, with the unwanted help of his neighbor Owen Forbes. Warfield is a former gunman trying to forget his violent past. Forbes, a decent, humane rancher, is also in love with Warfield's wife and feels guilty that he did not try to prevent the kidnapping.

An Indian trader, who feigns insanity (as the Indians will not kill a crazy person), reluctantly provides Warfield with some information. Next, Warfield and Forbes are captured by the Apaches and staked out on the ground to die. However, Mexican bandit DeLeon (who has dealings with the Indians) believes Warfield's story that he hid his money before he was caught and cuts him loose. Warfield manages to convince DeLeon to free Forbes and to lead them to the Apache encampment. Forbes mistakenly kills DeLeon before he can show them where the camp is.

The two men detour to a town where a doctor is being overwhelmed caring for the victims of cholera. They buy supplies, and Forbes learns the location of the Apache camp. On the way, they enter a deserted Mormon settlement, where they encounter a detachment of U.S. Cavalry led by "Captain" Jefferson Addis. However, all is not what it seems. It turns out that Addis, who is actually a corporal, and the rest killed the real captain so that they could trade two wagons full of weapons and ammunition to the Apaches in return for an army payroll the latter recently captured. The Apaches, however, have other ideas; they attack. During the battle, Warfield arranges it for them to steal a wagon. The wagon leaves deep tracks allowing him easily to locate the Indian camp. Warfield and Forbes rescue the captives.

Safely back home, Forbes challenges Warfield (who is now unarmed, having traded his gun to a storekeeper for clothing for his family) to a duel for the woman, but Warfield just turns and walks away. Forbes throws him a pistol, Warfield refuses to pick it up. Forbes then shoots Warfield in the leg. Before Forbes can finish him off, he is shot and killed by the storekeeper using Warfield's gun.

== Cast ==
- Glenn Ford as Lorn Warfield
- Arthur Kennedy as Owen Forbes
- Dean Jagger as Jimmy Noble
- John Anderson as Captain Jefferson Addis
- Paul Fix as Sheriff Kelso
- Nico Minardos as Jose Luis Gomez de la Tierra y Cordoba DeLeon
- Harry Dean Stanton as Sergeant Parker
- Pilar Pellicer as Lydia Yearby
- Parley Baer as Willford
- Royal Dano as Dr. Eli Prather
- Ross Elliott as Reverend Yearby
- Barbara Babcock as Angie Warfield
- James Griffith as Storekeeper - Hazenville

== Production ==
Day of the Evil Gun originally was going to be a made-for-TV movie. The film was made in Durango, Mexico.

=== Music ===
Jeff Alexander's theme from Day of the Evil Gun is in the Library of Congress.

== Release ==
=== Critical response ===
A. H. Weiler of The New York Times wrote, "Glenn Ford again outlasts the competition, of course, but a viewer is left with the uneasy feeling that the cast should rate a mite more than mere saddle sores for their workmanlike effort to add a chapter to Hollywood's winning of the West."
