= Mobil Showcase Network =

Occasional television network

- Type: Occasional network
- Country: USA
- Availability: top 50 markets
- Owner: Mobil; SFM Media Service
- Key people: Herb Schmertz
- Established: 1976; 49 years ago
- Dissolved: 1984; 41 years ago

The Mobil Showcase Network, also known as Mobil Showcase or Mobil Showcase Theatre, was an occasional television network from 1976 to 1984 with an ad hoc group of stations.

== Background ==
A Mobil Oil media expert, Herb Schmertz, wrote canned paid "editorials" placed into newspapers like the New York Times opinion-editorial page. Schmertz also had Mobil underwriting Masterpiece Theatre to improve Mobil's image, which Mobil has been sole supporter since the beginning of the series. He also considered having the company buy a newspaper, the Long Island Press. He instead settled on a "sort of TV network" as Mobil and Schmertz were frustrated with the network-developed anti-oil-company news and documentaries.

== History ==
Schmertz worked with SFM Media Service Corporation lining up 43 stations, primarily in the top 50 markets; half of these were network affiliates. Mobil paid $3.2 million to the stations for the 8 PM ET/PT Thursday time slot for 10 weeks. In the winter of 1976, Mobil launched its first show, Ten Who Dared, hosted by Anthony Quinn and adapted from a 1975 BBC documentary series, which was originally shown in the UK as The Explorers and presented by David Attenborough. The show dramatized the adventures of various explorers (including James Cook, Christopher Columbus, Roald Amundsen and Mary Kingsley), and was one of the highest budgeted BBC shows for its time. The commercials were exclusively for Mobil, with some of them in a "documentary" or reality-based format showing Mobil employees out in the field, and shown in a positive light. The show beat the networks in the ratings, defeating NBC's The Fantastic Journey, and even CBS's The Waltons. Based on the ratings, Mobil arranged for two more "'non-network' series."

In 1979, the Showcase featured Edward & Mrs. Simpson. For summer 1980, Mobil Showcase assembled a group of shows dubbed Summershow.

== Programs ==
- Ten Who Dared (1976), a BBC/Time-Life/West German TV series with Anthony Quinn hosting for the Mobil Showcase broadcast
  - January 13, 1977: Christopher Columbus' maiden voyage to the New World.
  - January 20, 1977: Francisco Pizarro and the Spanish conquest of the Inca Empire.
  - January 27, 1977: Captain James Cook's voyages to the Pacific Ocean.
  - February 3, 1977: Alexander von Humboldt's scientific exploration of Venezuela.
  - February 10, 1977: Jedediah Smith's transcontinental treks across America.
  - February 17, 1977: Attempt by Robert O'Hara Burke and William John Wills to cross Australia from south to north.
  - February 24, 1977: Henry Morton Stanley's first trans-Africa exploration.
  - March 3, 1977: Charles Montagu Doughty's attempt at participating in the Hajj.
  - March 10, 1977: Mary Kingsley's journeys to the west coast of Central Africa.
  - March 17, 1977: Roald Amundsen's South Pole expedition.
- When Havoc Struck (1978)
- Between the Wars (1978)
- Edward & Mrs. Simpson (1979)
- Summershow (Summer 1980)
  - A Party with Comden and Green
  - New York, New York
  - Bells are Ringing
  - The Party's Over
  - The America Game
- The Life and Adventures of Nicholas Nickleby
- The Children's Story (1982 TV short), by James Clavell
- King Lear (1984)
- 2 X Forsyth (1984)
  - A Careful Man
  - Privilege
- Lord Mountbatten: The Last Viceroy (scheduled for 1986)

== See also ==
- Fourth television network
- Masterpiece (TV series) (previously Masterpiece Theatre)
- Operation Prime Time
- SFM Entertainment
