= Daniel H. Overmyer =

American businessman (1924–2012)

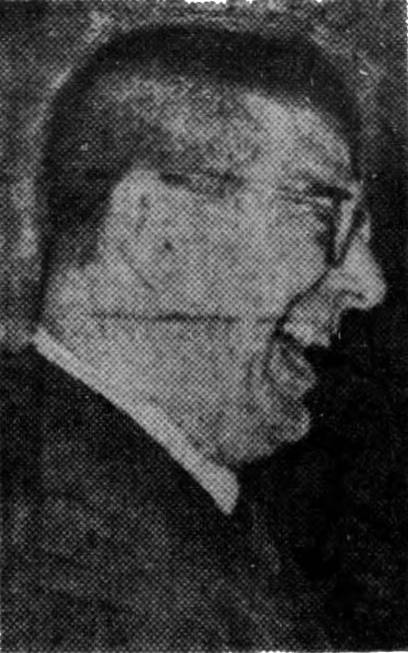
- From a 1966 newspaper
- Born: Daniel Harrison Overmyer; December 6, 1924; Toledo, Ohio, U.S.
- Died: July 24, 2012 (aged 87); Tarzana, Los Angeles, California, U.S.
- Education: Denison University
- Years active: 1947–1986
- Known for: Warehouse chain operator; Founder of WDHO-TV and the United Network
- Criminal charges: Bankruptcy fraud, conspiracy to commit bankruptcy fraud, mail fraud
- Criminal penalty: 3 years in federal prison (6 months in custody), 3 years probation, $5,000 fine
- Spouse: Shirley C. Overmyer (m. 1943; died 1994)
- Children: 5
- Parents: Harrison M. Overmyer (father); Cora B. Overmyer (mother)

Daniel Harrison Overmyer (December 6, 1924 – July 24, 2012) was an American businessman, warehouse mogul, and television broadcaster. During the height of his career, Overmyer was referred to as "the king of warehousing".

A second-generation warehouse operator, Overmyer aggressively expanded his holdings in the 1950s and 1960s with a warehouse design structure unlike prior models, which emphasized ease of transportation of goods and more efficient storage. At its height, the D. H. Overmyer Warehouse Company boasted over 350 warehouses and 32 million square feet of space in North America and Europe. Overmyer also extended his influence to television station ownership: between 1964 and 1965, a total of seven construction permits for ultra high frequency (UHF) stations were either granted by the Federal Communications Commission (FCC) or acquired in related transactions. Of these seven permits, only one, WDHO-TV in Toledo, Ohio, was built and signed on by Overmyer directly.

Financial constraints caused by an overexpansion in the warehouse business led Overmyer to sell majority control of the other unbuilt stations to American Viscose Corporation (AVC) in exchange for a loan. The FCC's deference on examining Overmyer's financial situation and the composition of the sale resulted in a congressional investigation and multiple FCC hearings that delayed the renewal of WDHO's broadcast license for a decade. Another planned venture, a fourth television network originally dubbed the Overmyer Network, was sold by Overmyer to a group of investors weeks before launching in May 1967. Renamed the United Network, the network ceased operations after one month due to significant financial losses, cancelling their lone offering, The Las Vegas Show.

Overmyer's continued financial overextensions, coupled with his practice of borrowing from one corporate subsidiary to pay for another subsidiary, resulted in a prolonged series of Chapter 11 bankruptcy filings that lasted for nearly 12 years. Initially filed with the Southern District of New York (SDNY), allegations published in the New York Daily News of money laundering and financial kickbacks by an accounting firm headed by a brother of the presiding judge led to the judge's removal in 1978. The bankruptcies enveloped all of Overmyer's 41 subsidiaries: when the subsidiary holding WDHO's license was led out of bankruptcy by SDNY in 1981, that subsidiary filed for bankruptcy again in Cleveland, Ohio. Allegations of Overmyer and an associate defrauding the bank that held stock in WDHO led the bank to seize control of the station, selling it to a third party. All of Overmyer's other assets were auctioned off by SDNY throughout 1985. Overmyer was eventually convicted of bankruptcy fraud in 1989 in federal court following investigations by both the FBI and IRS.

== Early life ==
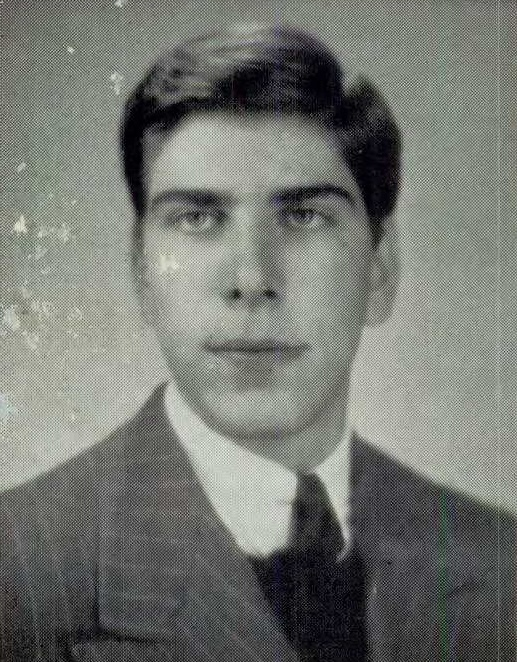
Overmyer's 1942 yearbook photo at Ottawa Hills High School

Overmyer was born in Toledo, Ohio, the only child of Harrison Morton Overmyer and Cora Belle (Pooke) Overmyer. Overmyer was adopted. While his mother was described as "prim and proper" and his father "mild-mannered, slender ... whose dress was so impeccable", he gained a reputation for being a bully, with an "obnoxious" demeanor, a slovenly wardrobe and was overweight throughout his life. His grandfather was a Toledo grocery wholesaler early in the 20th century, while Harrison operated a single warehouse in the city, the Merchant's and Manufacturers Warehouse. Growing up in Ottawa Hills, Ohio, Overmyer graduated from Ottawa Hills High School and attended Denison University in Granville, Ohio.

While a Denison student in 1943, Overmyer was drafted into the army; he served as a private and transport warrant officer during World War II, and helped with barge unloadings during the landings in Normandy on D-Day. Overmyer grew up a fan of the Toledo Mud Hens, the city's minor league baseball club, and unsuccessfully tried to buy the team at the age of 27.

In 1947, Overmyer opened his first warehouse on Smead Avenue in Toledo, financed with $2,000 borrowed from his father. The warehouse chain grew quickly, expanding from seven branches in 1954 to 260 buildings in 55 cities nationwide by 1965. Overmyer is credited with the creation of modern warehouse design; while most, including the Smead Avenue facility, were multi-story facilities, they were redesigned by Overmyer to be long, narrow, single-story buildings with high ceilings, removing a large bottleneck in transporting goods. By 1966, Duns Review called Overmyer "the undisputed king of the warehousemen". Overmyer founded the D. H. Overmyer Company, Inc. as a holding company for warehouse subsidiaries throughout the United States, Canada, and Europe, with 350 warehouses and 32 million square feet of space. Overmyer typically set up loans for far much more than the actual construction cost for a warehouse, believing loan officers, insurance agents and retirement funds were easy targets.

Overmyer married Shirley King in 1943; they had four adopted children. Overmyer was arrested in 1953 when breaking in with another person into a Huron, Ohio, apartment to take back a foster child returned to their mother. The charges against him were eventually dropped. After Harrison died in 1960, Cora was named as the main beneficiary to his $500,000 estate, but Overmyer sued Cora and the bank overseeing the estate. Two years after the litigation began, Cora died, and Overmyer asserted full control.

From 1962 to 1966, Overmyer controlled the Toledo Monitor, launched in 1959 as a business newspaper but ventured into yellow and tabloid journalism during his four-year tenure as owner. The Monitor championed future state legislator Charles Kurfess, later an attorney for Overmyer, but also promoted the likes of Westbrook Pegler, reflecting Overmyer's conservative beliefs, finding the Toledo Blade to be "left-wing". The Monitor folded 90 days after he sold it. He also established a bank, Progress National Bank, that grew from $1 million in assets to $5 million in two years.

== Entering UHF broadcasting ==
On April 15, 1963, Overmyer applied with the Federal Communications Commission (FCC) for a license on channel 79 in Toledo, as the market's first ultra high frequency (UHF) television station, and the only such channel allocated to Toledo. While still a speculative investment in 1963, the All-Channel Receiver Act mandated the inclusion of UHF channels on newly constructed television sets. Overmyer stated in a 1966 interview, "we know that UHF is a solid investment ... the time has come for UHF television". Two other applicants also filed for the channel 79 allocation, prompting the FCC to open a comparative hearing beginning in March 1964. One of the applicants, Springfield Television, questioned Overmyer's financial qualifications, suggesting the warehouse company had inadequate funds to operate a television station, which the FCC rejected. By September 1964, Overmyer agreed to pay the out-of-pocket expenses for both competitors to withdraw their applications.

While the application process for the Toledo permit was ongoing, Overmyer established the D. H. Overmyer Communications Company in June 1964. Headquartered in New York City, this company sought ownership of seven television stations, then the limit for station ownership, along with possible investments in cable and pay television. Over the next several months, Overmyer filed to purchase construction permits for WATL-TV in Atlanta, and two unbuilt stations: WNOP-TV in Newport, Kentucky, serving Cincinnati, Ohio, and KBAY-TV in San Francisco. Overmyer also applied for stations in Stamford, Connecticut, Dallas, Texas, and Rosenberg, Texas, serving Houston, Texas. The Stamford permit was withdrawn after Overmyer offered to purchase the license for silent station WAND-TV in Pittsburgh, Pennsylvania, and filed a waiver to own eight stations instead of seven, which the FCC rejected.

The Atlanta, Cincinnati, Pittsburgh, and San Francisco purchases were all approved by the FCC in 1965, as were the construction permits in Houston and Toledo; KBAY-TV's previous owner retained a minority interest. The UHF allocation table was modified by the FCC on June 4, 1965, affecting both the Houston and Toledo permits. The Toledo station, now at channel 24, took the call sign of WDHO-TV, derived from Overmyer's initials. Likewise, the call letters assigned for the other stations—KEMO-TV, WSCO-TV, WECO-TV, WBMO-TV, and KJDO-TV—were the initials of Overmyer's family members. (Note: This naming convention later carried over into one of Overmyer's corporate subsidiaries, Jeebs Distribution Services. Jeebs was derived from the first letter of children John, Edward, Elizabeth and Barbara, and wife Shirley; Jeebs also was the name of a family dog.) WDHO-TV began operation on May 3, 1966, nominally as an independent but airing shows from ABC, CBS, and NBC that did not air on either WTOL-TV or WSPD-TV. The Dallas application initially was competed against by Maxwell Electronics Corporation, which ultimately won the license to channel 33 when that allocation opened up. The allocation change placed Overmyer's application, now on channel 27, against Gordon McLendon, owner of KLIF and KNUS-FM; Overmyer withdrew the application.

Purchase of equipment for the station began in late 1965; by 1966, a $3 million order was placed to purchase programming in 1966, and transmitter sites were secured later in 1966 for all but the Atlanta and Pittsburgh stations. The television stations were to have been financed by Overmyer's warehouse company, but the lead contractor for the warehouses encountered financial distress, owing $18 million to shareholders in 1967; this resulted in multiple unfinished buildings with liens placed on them. The warehouse company also had substantial overhead: the financial development team frequently traveled across the country, with monthly airfare as high as $80,000. Overmyer agreed to guarantee a $5–6 million debt from the contractor, which in turn restricted available funds to construct the television stations. By January 1967, only the San Francisco and Cincinnati stations had progress of any sort, and construction on the Atlanta, Pittsburgh and Houston stations had not started. The cash crunch brought on by guaranteeing the contractor's debt was later attributed as the reason for Overmyer's 1967 sale of Progress National Bank.

== A fourth television network ==
Overmyer announced plans on July 12, 1966, to create the Overmyer Network, a fourth television network to compete against the Big Three television networks, hiring former ABC president Oliver Treyz as network president. Treyz said the network would provide eight straight hours of programming to affiliates, including two hours of news supplied by United Press International, thematic programming devoted to a different genre every night, and a two-hour late-night talk show from Las Vegas. The announcement was largely met with surprise, particularly given Overmyer's lack of experience and only having WDHO-TV in operation. The network received exclusive rights to the Continental Football League, and by December 1966, the Overmyer Network had signed TV stations in 123 markets, including 24 of the largest 25 markets. Industry analysts voiced skepticism over the network's prospects, and questioned if Overmyer actually had the financial resources to succeed.

By early 1967, Overmyer had inadequate funds to continue developing the network because of the warehouse company's financial difficulties. Company officials went to the board of directors of the Mutual Broadcasting System to discuss a merger of the two networks, requesting some $500,000 to begin production of the late-night show and additional funds to keep the network operational until advertising revenue became available. The Mutual board turned down the merger proposal, but three stockholders showed interest and formed a syndicate with eleven other businessmen to buy 80 percent stock in the Overmyer Network in March 1967, renaming it the United Network. Overmyer retained 20 percent of the network stock but now had no board seat or managerial role. The same advertising agencies who voiced enthusiasm when the network was first announced were now reluctant to purchase commercial time on it.

The United Network and The Las Vegas Show, hosted by Bill Dana, premiered on May 1, 1967. In early May, Overmyer sold his 20 percent interest in the network to majority stockholders for $240,000 cash and a promissory note for $115,000. On June 1, 1967, the United Network folded because of insufficient advertising revenue and costly AT&T distribution charges, effectively cancelling The Las Vegas Show. Dana later mused, "at least I set a record. I'm the first man in history to sink an entire network." The network later filed for bankruptcy with $690,000 in debts. Lewron Television, a television production services company, sued both United and Overmyer for unpaid rental bills. Overmyer was initially found liable of up to $53,683 in a summary judgment; this was later reversed on appeal.

== Selling the permits to AVC ==
- Station built and signed on by Overmyer
- Permit sold by Overmyer to AVC, which signed on the station
- Permit sold by Overmyer to AVC, but never constructed
- Application previously made by Overmyer but withdrawn
- Station acquired separately by AVC to form U.S. Communications Corp.

Needing financing to finish construction of the stations, Overmyer agreed on March 28, 1967, to sell 80 percent majority control of his construction permits to the American Viscose Corporation (AVC). One partner in the investment firm facilitating the sale with Overmyer was a stockholder in WPHL-TV, an existing UHF station in Philadelphia; another partner was appointed to the AVC board of directors after the sale. AVC arranged to merge the Overmyer permits with WPHL's parent company to form U.S. Communications Corporation on June 8, 1967, giving the combined company six television stations in the top fifty markets. (Note: In 1967, the American Research Bureau (ARB) ranked the size of the TV viewing audience for the six cities using net weekly circulation: Philadelphia, 4; San Francisco, 7; Pittsburgh, 9; Cincinnati, 16; Atlanta, 19; and Houston, 25.) The FCC approved the sale on December 8, 1967, waiving a proposed rule in place since 1965 that sought to limit television station ownership within the top fifty markets; a practice the FCC had employed before in similar transactions.

Days after the deal was approved, Rep. Harley O. Staggers, chairman of the House Investigations Subcommittee, summoned all FCC members to testify over the decision not to hold hearings. FCC chairman Rosel H. Hyde testified that if a hearing had been ordered, the sale would have been abandoned. Hyde stated, "I believe that the possibility of refinancing the UHF stations would have failed had we designated the matter for hearing", and that any hearing "...might very well have defeated this effort to salvage a sinking enterprise". Hyde concluded Overmyer's application was sufficient for approval" and agreed with commissioner Kenneth A. Cox that the true nature of the transaction was to raise funds to save the warehouse business. Cox criticized the submission of out-of-pocket expenses and the loan and option agreement in the transaction, claiming it violated an FCC policy by providing a profit.

When the deal closed on January 15, 1968, Overmyer received the second $1.5 million portion of the total $3 million agreed to in the loan contract. AVC was an investment company with no experience in television broadcasting, thus only provided financing for U.S. Communications, while WPHL was used for leadership: two WPHL executives became part of U.S.'s management team. Overmyer's role was limited to only his 20 percent stock in the Atlanta, Pittsburgh, Cincinnati, and Houston permits, with no managerial oversight; U.S. also included a provision that could compel Overmyer to divest his 20 percent interest and an option to purchase it between January 16, 1971, and January 15, 1972. The contract limited the highest purchase price to $3 million, the same amount AVC had loaned to Overmyer; the loan was secured by second mortgages on twenty-three of Overmyer's warehouse properties and his 20 percent interest in the TV stations. U.S. never executed its option to buy the stock and Overmyer repaid the $3 million loan.

Four of the five stations signed on between 1968 and 1969: KEMO-TV in San Francisco, WXIX-TV in Cincinnati, WPGH-TV in Pittsburgh, and WATL-TV in Atlanta, all joining WPHL-TV. The Houston permit was deleted by the FCC on October 13, 1971. Except for the studio location for WXIX-TV, U.S. Communications used the studio and transmitter locations selected by Overmyer.

=== Congressional hearings and FCC investigations ===
The House Investigations Subcommittee continued to examine the approval of the Overmyer-AVC deal, with Rep. Staggers mailing a set of 26 detailed questions to the entire commission. By February 1968, a bill was proposed in the U.S. House of Representatives to prohibit "station trading" and set perimeters by the FCC to determine the fair market value of a station's assets. At the same time, the FCC terminated the Top Fifty Interim Policy but kept the clause requiring a public interest showing in future ownership transfers, noting the success of UHF television expansion; the repeal drew a public rebuke from Rep. Staggers. The Subcommittee conducted another set of wide-ranging hearings on the Overmyer-AVC deal in July and August 1968: with Overmyer, AVC president Dr. Frank H. Reichel, five FCC staffers and the commissioners named as witnesses. The hearing now focused on the FCC's competence in granting the original permits to Overmyer, as well as Overmyer's financial qualifications.

Overmyer's method of calculating out-of-pocket expenses proved essential in the hearings as half of the amount was based on opinion instead of documented evidence. The FCC received copies of letters from banks willing to talk about loans to help fund construction of the television stations, which was regarded as "partial evidence" of "financial capability" by Overmyer but was found by the Subcommittee not to be actual commitments. Overmyer executives testified that they were not "firm commitments" but showed willingness by the banks to negotiate "...when the time was right". The hearings were characterized in Broadcasting magazine as "fishing for evidence ... [b]ut it has portrayed the commission as having acted in a casual, perhaps even inept, manner". One observer to the hearings noted that the harsh criticism by the Subcommittee left "blood all over the floor".

The FCC was criticized in the Subcommittee's report for awarding the permits to Overmyer based on "unsubstantiated representations" and refused to provide any scrutiny, particularly with his failure to provide necessary financial information. Overmyer's applications also failed a financial standard placed by the commission in 1965 to determine the fiscal health within the first year of a station; the Broadcast Bureau made estimates of station income to justify the financing. Overmyer also omitted information about the warehouse company, which the Subcommittee found to have operated at significant losses in 1964 and 1965. The report further stated the FCC acted "carelessly and in disregard of the law" by allowing the permits to be approved and subsequently sold to U.S. and called the sale to U.S. a "sham" guaranteeing Overmyer a profit violating the FCC's out-of-pocket expense policy by effectively disguising a $3 million stock payment as a loan. The Subcommittee recommended the FCC rescind their approval and conduct individual hearings along with further legislation and policy changes.

Following the report, the FCC announced on August 26, 1970, a hearing for the Overmyer–U.S. sale to examine out-of-pocket expenses involved and determine if fraud was committed; concurrently, WDHO-TV's license renewal was deferred. (Note: WDHO-TV's initial license was issued on October 2, 1967; the FCC considered a TV station's license for renewal every three years.) WDHO had become Toledo's ABC affiliate on June 15, 1969, after operating as an independent but did not launch local newscasts until 1972; the news department was initially housed in a garage adjacent to—but not connected with—the studio building, a repurposed warehouse. Overmyer pledged the stock of WDHO's license subsidiary to the First National Bank of Boston (FNBB) as security for a $6 million loan in 1971. Because of poor advertising revenue, WATL-TV and KEMO-TV left the air on March 31, 1971, with WPGH-TV following suit on August 16, 1971; WPGH entered bankruptcy after going dark. WXIX-TV, however, remained on-air, and was sold to Metromedia in 1972 for the assumption of that station's $3 million debt.

In the initial decision issued on April 20, 1973, administrative law judge Herbert Sharfman determined Overmyer overstated his total out-of-pocket expenses by $227,000, but found no evidence of maliciousness or fraud. Due to U.S. divesting the acquired station prior to the ruling and their option to purchase Overmyer's 20 percent stock having long since expired, the ruling only affected the deferred renewal of WDHO's license. The Broadcast Bureau disagreed with the ruling as Overmyer still owned WDHO and regarded the financial misrepresentation as a possible character qualification issue; after Overmyer filed to have the case dismissed or remanded, the FCC review board remanded the case in January 1974, sending it back to Sharfman. Judge Sharfman cleared Overmyer of the misrepresentation charges in his May 13, 1974, supplemental initial decision, stating there was "a complete failure of the record to inculpate Mr. Overmyer personally, directly or by implication". The FCC Review Board affirmed Sharfman's ruling on August 21, 1975.

== Bankruptcy ==
The sale of Overmyer's television permits for loan payments, along with his tactic of borrowing against one subsidiary to pay for another, did little to alleviate his financial position, as by November 1973, Overmyer held more than $25 million in debt. On November 29, 1973, Overmyer's 220 warehouses began shutting down production and he entered Chapter 11 bankruptcy in New York; creditors shouted for their money during the initial bankruptcy court hearing. FNBB also filed a lawsuit against Overmyer on May 7, 1974, contesting that they held all 500 shares in WDHO-TV stock as collateral for the now-defaulted loans, now totaling $10.5 million, and sought control of 249 shares. Overmyer countersued for $200 million under claims FNBB forced him into insolvency. WDHO-TV filed for bankruptcy in January 1976 when FNBB set up an auction for the station's assets, with the station placed under a debtor in possession arrangement.

Bankruptcy court judge Roy Babitt appointed one of the creditors, Robert Herzog, to manage the Overmyer businesses. A New York Daily News investigation revealed that Herzog appointed a member of an accounting firm run by Babitt's brother to assist in audits on the companies but engaged in money laundering, kickbacks, and other personal favors. One approved check for $13,000 in repairs on an Overmyer Nashville warehouse was later traced to a fictitious bank account that had an address of an empty Nashville alley. Overmyer told the Daily News "I had no choice" and that he was told to approve the plan or else face liquidation. Overmyer provided documents to the Southern District of New York (SDNY) and the Federal Bureau of Investigation (FBI), hired private detectives and contacted columnist Jack Anderson, who talked to the Daily News; Overmyer said of the court, "I watched a company with $220 million in assets be reduced to $5 million through mismanagement and fraud." One company attorney reported their concerns to the FBI, which began an investigation of their own against Babitt and Herzog; concurrently, SDNY convened to investigate Babitt. Babitt impounded all files related to the bankruptcy case from public inspection, which he reversed himself on the following day.

Overmyer's attorneys requested Babitt to remove himself from the case, and requested subpoenas for 46 people including Herzog. Babitt refused to remove himself and instead ordered a liquidation of all assets on April 7, 1978, declaring the company to still be "hopelessly in debt". A grand jury was eventually called to investigate these allegations. On May 23, 1978, federal judge Lloyd F. MacMahon removed Babitt from the case and vacated the liquidation order. Murray Guy, a court appointee, pled guilty to fraud and agreed to cooperate with investigators. Babitt was eventually cleared by a five-member committee of SDNY judges, but was criticized for "poor judgment" having his brother's accounting firm be involved, creating an avoidable "appearance of influence". That same year, Overmyer purchased the Weathervane Farm, an estate house with 268 acres (1.08 km^{2}) of land in Yorktown, New York, using funds from the various bankrupt companies; Overmyer sold off 178 of the acres for $1.5 million.

=== Losing WDHO and the warehouse empire ===
The Broadcast Bureau requested another review to the 1975 Review Board report that cleared Overmyer, which the FCC denied on July 1, 1980, noting both the antiquity of the case and that Overmyer was now an inactive station owner due to WDHO's bankruptcy, making any further examination of his character qualifications moot. After ten years in deferred status, WDHO-TV's license was renewed on October 6, 1980. WDHO's bankruptcy proceeding was dismissed in 1980 and appealed by Overmyer; when the SDNY court denied the appeal on February 6, 1981, WDHO again filed for Chapter 11 bankruptcy the same day, this time in Cleveland, Ohio, again with Overmyer operating the station as a debtor in possession. Control of WDHO was awarded to FNBB on March 25, 1981, by the Cleveland court; Overmyer filed objections with the FCC claiming the order violated rules regarding transfer of control for broadcast station licenses. FNBB called the takeover of WDHO proper as part of their debt collection: Overmyer was indebted by as much as $22.4 million to the bank. In 1980 and 1981, WDHO staffers agreed to payroll deductions to benefit the United Way, but the money collected was never donated until FNBB took over. Early in 1982, Overmyer filed for personal bankruptcy.

The Cleveland court ruled on September 24, 1982, to establish a constructive trust for all of Overmyer's assets, including WDHO, after finding that Overmyer deliberately attempted to defraud FNBB. The modular trailer that housed WDHO's newsroom was promptly repossessed by FNBB officials. The ruling also impacted a television station Overmyer's daughter Elizabeth was planning to construct in Yuma, Arizona, having been awarded a construction permit days after; FNBB took over all stock held by Elizabeth's company, Manning Telecasting. (Note: This was not the first attempt by Elizabeth Overmyer to enter broadcasting. She, her sister Barbara (Overmyer) Strang and brother-in-law Stuart Strang, co-founded Strang Telecasting, which competed against Lima, Ohio, radio station WTGN for a license on channel 44 in Lima. While WTGN sought to operate channel 44 as a religious independent, Strang wanted to run it as a secular station. When Strang Telecasting tried to purchase KWRB-TV in Riverton, Wyoming, WTGN filed a petition to deny that delayed and terminated the sale after a year. Channel 44 in Lima ultimately signed on as WTLW after WTGN won the permit and sold it to a third party.) The FCC rejected Overmyer's petition on May 12, 1983, and approved FNBB's takeover of the station. The SDNY subsequently ordered the sale of Overmyer's assets. FNBB sold WDHO-TV in June 1985 to a local group, Toledo Television Investors, Ltd., for $19.6 million. FNBB also repossessed the Weathervane Farm in 1985, evicting Overmyer and his wife. One Overmyer attorney called FNBB "First Felony Bank of Boston" after the bank pled guilty for failing to report $1.2 billion in cash transfers with Swiss banks, calling the bankruptcy case "the crookedest thing I have ever seen... tainted by fraud on all sides".

A warehouse adjacent to the WDHO studios on South Byrne Road in Toledo was sold to Canadian investors the following month, the last asset among the D. H. Overmyer Company's 41 subsidiaries to be auctioned off. The company was wound down in an office on 260 Fifth Avenue, having been forced from their prior offices on 3 Park Avenue; among the items left behind were memoirs by Overmyer dictated to a tape recorder. Despite the bankruptcies, Overmyer was rumored in 1983 as a potential white knight investor for Columbia Pacific Bank & Trust before it folded; by 1985, he began working as a consultant for Vancouver–based Crossland Industries Corp., controlled by Sean Deneney, Elizabeth Overmyer's husband.

=== Federal indictments ===
In retrospect, the collapse of the Overmyer empire didn't have to happen. His innovations were wiped out by stubbornness, greed, and excessive litigation. He played the game brilliantly at times but eventually blundered his way into a situation he couldn't win. He lived by the courts, and his business died by the courts. He lacked the grace to take defeat, and thereby turned defeat into disaster.

— Homer Brickey, The Toledo Blade

In his September 1982 ruling, Cleveland bankruptcy court judge John Ray, Jr. compared the fraud committed by Overmyer against FNBB to Twyne's Case, saying, "fraud and deceit have come a long way since 1601... this court has never encountered such a systematic distortion of truth and the legal system. However, as clever as Mr. Overmyer's system was, it still left numerous "badges of fraud". Cited specifically were both Overmyer and attorney Edmund M. Connery, who provided legal assistance for Overmyer off and on through the 1970s and early 1980s despite billing himself as an "independent" attorney. The Hadar Leasing Company, which operated as an Overmyer subsidiary from the Park Avenue offices, filed a proof of claim of $859,481.80 in the WDHO bankruptcy proceedings on August 7, 1981, after they also entered Chapter 11. Hadar purchased broadcast equipment and leased it back to the WDHO subsidiary; aspects of the leases were found out to be falsified to the bankruptcy court, inflating the Hadar claim and unjustly enriching Overmyer. Following Ray's judgement, the FBI and Internal Revenue Service began their own investigations.

In June 1984, Overmyer was indicted on one charge of fraud in the U. S. District Court for the Western District of Kentucky. The charge alleged that, in 1977, Overmyer purchased the Peerless Manufacturing Corp. from Dover Corporation, placed the company under a trust run by a daughter, and transferred $1 million of the company's money between October 1977 and August 1979 to pay off existing personal and business debts. Peerless went out of business in 1980. The charge was dismissed in October 1984 by federal judge Charles M. Allen, who interpreted the findings of Judge Ray (who regarded the trust as a sham controlled by Overmyer) as Overmyer effectively moving money "from one pocket to the other".

Overmyer and Connery were indicted on January 28, 1986, in the U. S. District Court for the Northern District of Ohio. Overmyer faced six counts of bankruptcy fraud, two counts of conspiracy to commit bankruptcy fraud, and one count of mail fraud; Connery, charged with six counts, was granted a separate trial. The fraudulent Hadar proof of claim was central to Overmyer's indictment. Overmyer was convicted by a federal jury in Akron, Ohio, of one count of filing a false bankruptcy claim, and Connery was convicted of one count of aiding and abetting the filing of a false bankruptcy claim. Trial judge Sam H. Bell overturned the convictions, citing inadequate evidence, but the U. S. Court of Appeals for the Sixth Circuit in Cincinnati rejected Bell's verdict and reinstated the verdicts on February 10, 1989. Overmyer was sentenced on July 21, 1989, to three years in federal prison with six months in custody, three years on probation, and a $5,000 fine. A 1986 Blade profile on Overmyer was included in the presentencing report, drawing a protest from Overmyer's attorney. Both the Sixth Circuit and the U. S. Supreme Court denied appeals from Overmyer in 1990, letting the convictions stand. Connery, who died in 1991, was sentenced to two years on probation with a $5,000 fine, and was disbarred from practicing law in New York State.

In early 1988, the British Columbia superintendent of brokers announced a probe into Crossland's spending of $1.3 million in shareholder's money for management, professional and consulting fees, promotion, travel and entertainment. Also examined were plans to manage a marble quarry in China, which Overmyer traveled to in January 1986 to negotiate with, that later collapsed. Trading on Crossland stock was suspended on the Vancouver Stock Exchange on July 23, 1987. After numerous financial irregularities came to light, including Crossland news releases between May 1985 and July 1987 that were not factual, Overmyer, Sean Deneney and son John Overmyer all agreed to trading suspensions. Overmyer's was for 10 years, while Deneney and John Overmyer were for three years each; all three were barred from serving as officers or directors for any British Columbia–based public company for the same duration.

On May 15, 1991, Overmyer was released from the Federal Correctional Institute (FCI) Englewood in Littleton, Colorado.

== Later years ==
After being evicted from the Weathervane Farm, Overmyer and Shirley lived in various places, including Katonah, New York; Montreal, Quebec (where Shirley lived initially to assist in Overmyer's Canadian warehouse operations); and Fairfield, Connecticut. Following this, Overmyer's primary residence was in Denver, Colorado, for nearly 25 years. Shirley preceded him in death on December 2, 1994, in Montreal. An additional daughter, Olga, was also adopted by Overmyer following Shirley's death. Until suffering a stroke in 2009, Overmyer worked as a merchant banker for various African nations; after the stroke, he moved to an assisted living facility in Tarzana, Los Angeles, California, to be closer to his son, John.

Overmyer died on July 24, 2012, at the Providence Tarzana Medical Center in Tarzana, at the age of 87. He was buried in Sylvania, Ohio.
