= WPGH-TV =

Television station in Pittsburgh

- Pittsburgh, Pennsylvania; United States
- Channels: Digital: 20 (UHF); Virtual: 53
- Branding: Fox 53

Programming
- Affiliations: 53.1: Fox; for others, see § Subchannels

Ownership
- Owner: Sinclair Broadcast Group; (WPGH Licensee, LLC)
- Sister stations: WPNT

History
- First air date: August 1, 1953 (Note: First test pattern on air July 14, 1953. Commercial programming began August 1, 1953, as WKJF-TV and ended on July 2, 1954. The station resumed broadcasting as WPGH-TV on February 1, 1969, and again left the air on August 16, 1971. It returned on January 14, 1974.)
- Former call signs: WKJF-TV (1953–1961); WAND-TV (1961–1965); WECO-TV (1965–1968)
- Former channel numbers: Analog: 53 (UHF, 1953–2009); Digital: 43 (UHF, 2002–2020)
- Former affiliations: Independent (1953–1954, 1969–1971, 1974–1986); NBC (secondary, 1953–1954); Dark (1954–1969, 1971–1974)
- Call sign meaning: Pittsburgh

Technical information
- Licensing authority: FCC
- Facility ID: 73875
- ERP: 800 kW
- HAAT: 302.8 m (993 ft)
- Transmitter coordinates: 40°29′43″N 80°0′16″W

Links
- Public license information: Public file; LMS
- Website: wpgh53.com

WPGH-TV (channel 53) is a television station in Pittsburgh, Pennsylvania, United States, affiliated with the Fox network. It is owned by Sinclair Broadcast Group alongside dual CW and MyNetworkTV affiliate WPNT (channel 22). The two stations share studios on Ivory Avenue in the city's Summer Hill neighborhood, where WPGH-TV's transmitter is also located.

Channel 53 was the second TV channel to be activated in Pittsburgh, but the history of this station is discontinuous. It first emerged as WKJF-TV with commercial programming beginning on August 1, 1953. Owned by Agnes Jane Reeves Greer, it had second-choice rights to NBC programming and operated from a site shared with sister FM station WKJF-FM. Like many other ultra high frequency (UHF) TV stations, it struggled economically because not all homes could receive it and its signal was comparatively weak. It left the air on July 2, 1954, but the permit remained alive; the call sign was changed to WAND-TV in 1961, and the antenna was not dismantled until 1962. After federal authorities pushed holders of inactive UHF TV permits to build them, sell them, or forfeit them, Daniel H. Overmyer acquired the station in 1965 as part of a projected independent station group. He was unable to build what he called WECO-TV because of unexpected problems in transmitter site construction and financing difficulties. The independent stations were sold to U.S. Communications, a unit of American Viscose Corporation, which completed construction and put WPGH-TV on the air on February 1, 1969. U.S. Communications struggled with all of Overmyer's permits amid a soft advertising market; WPGH-TV was the third to leave the air on August 16, 1971, and was placed into bankruptcy.

Leon Crosby of San Francisco led an investor consortium named Pittsburgh Telecasting, which bought WPGH-TV out of bankruptcy and returned it to the air, this time for good, on January 14, 1974. Under Crosby and the successive ownerships of the Meredith Corporation, Lorimar-Telepictures, and Renaissance Communications, WPGH-TV endured as Pittsburgh's leading independent outlet. In 1986, it affiliated with Fox at the new network's launch; the Fox affiliation improved the station's ratings and advertising sales.

Sinclair Broadcast Group acquired WPGH-TV in 1991, selling the underperforming channel 22 (then WPTT) to Edwin Edwards in a move that in reality created a local marketing agreement. WPGH-TV started a 10 p.m. newscast, the Fox 53 Ten O'Clock News, in January 1997. It was the first such newscast on a broadcast station in the Pittsburgh market, but it was a ratings underperformer relative to similar newscasts in similarly sized markets. In 2003, Sinclair converted it to its News Central hybrid format, which led to declining ratings. The standalone news department was dissolved in January 2006, and WPGH-TV began airing newscasts produced by Pittsburgh NBC affiliate WPXI (channel 11).

== WKJF-TV ==
When the Federal Communications Commission (FCC) opened up applications for new TV stations after a years-long freeze, in 1952, it allocated three commercial ultra high frequency (UHF) TV channels to the city. The only applicant for channel 53 was Agnes Jane Reeves Greer, owner of WKJF-FM, the city's only standalone FM radio station. The FCC awarded permits for the other two UHF channels, 16 and 47, in December 1952; it deferred action on the channel 53 application until Reeves supplied "further information", granting it on January 8, 1953. Two executives from Pittsburgh's only operating TV station, WDTV, left to take up posts with the new WKJF-TV. Officials expected to be on the air within months based on a prior equipment order. The planned spring date was scrapped when a strike at General Electric delayed fabrication of the antenna, to be fastened to WKJF's tower on Mount Washington. It arrived in July, but a dispute over union jurisdiction held up completion of the job.

On July 11, 1953, WKJF-TV put out its first test picture; it was on the air for five minutes and still elicited a call from a viewer. A regular schedule of test patterns followed starting on July 14. Days before launching, the station finally secured network programming in the form of a secondary affiliation with NBC. WDTV continued to enjoy right of first refusal to telecast NBC programs in Pittsburgh, so WKJF-TV would only get those programs not aired on channel 2. On July 28, the station initiated its first test programs beyond a pattern. From studios on Grandview Avenue, WKJF-TV began airing regular programming on August 1, 1953. At the end of August, after an AT&T network loop was completed to the Mount Washington facility, the first NBC shows appeared on the station. In at least one instance, the station also carried a DuMont Television Network program; WDTV passed over DuMont's Boxing from Eastern Parkway Arena to carry Studio One, so WKJF-TV picked it up.

WKJF-TV was one of two UHF stations to start in Pittsburgh in 1953, the other being WENS on channel 16, which operated at much higher power. UHF stations' signals performed poorly in rougher terrain. Though Pittsburgh had only one pre-freeze and very high frequency (VHF) station, WDTV on channel 2, much of the city could receive a second VHF station, WJAC-TV on channel 6 from Johnstown. These stations could be received by any set, unlike WENS and WKJF-TV, which required converters to view on many VHF-only sets. On July 2, 1954, the station left the air indefinitely, expressing hope of returning if Congress did something to alleviate the plight of UHF stations; it lost $1 million in its operational history. WENS remained on air but struggled to get sponsors despite carrying popular network shows.

A Cleveland mail-order distributor expressed interest in buying WKJF-TV in 1955; he would have renamed the station WDAV and run it for the benefit of disabled veterans. The deal never came to fruition as the owners waited for the UHF situation to change. Rumors circulated that the group putting together Pittsburgh's new VHF station on channel 11 was interested in the property. The call sign on the channel 53 permit was changed from WKJF-TV to WAND-TV on March 13, 1961; the WAND letters had belonged to a Reeves-owned station in Canton, Ohio. The antenna was dismantled in 1962 and replaced with a new FM antenna for the co-located radio station; the former television facility was leased to another tenant.

== Overmyer–U.S. Communications era ==
=== A construction project undermined ===
In November 1964, the FCC told 29 permittees of inactive UHF stations, including WAND-TV, that they faced losing their permits unless action was taken to put them back into service. Faced with the pressing FCC action, in February 1965, Reeves Greer agreed to sell to the New York–based Overmyer Communications Corporation, owned by Daniel H. Overmyer. The purchase presented a complication for Overmyer, as it was the eighth station he was attempting to acquire and the ownership limit was seven stations. The $28,000 transaction did not include any physical facilities. Overmyer, as well as a group attempting to reactivate WENS, were encouraged not only by the FCC's action but by the All-Channel Receiver Act making all new sets UHF-compatible. The FCC denied Overmyer's petition to waive the ownership rule and returned the original filing as unacceptable. It was refiled and approved by the FCC in July.

On November 30, 1965, WAND-TV became WECO-TV, one of four stations named for Daniel Overmyer's children—in this case, Elizabeth C. Overmyer. Overmyer had opted not to lease any facilities from WKJF. By March 1966, Overmyer was preparing to put the station on the air for the fall television season as Pittsburgh's first independent station, with a mix of syndicated shows and network programs preempted by the local affiliates. Even before signing on, the station acquired mobile video tape recording equipment. Overmyer was still promising this in May, along with a series of 22 new warehouses to be located in the Pittsburgh area.

Soon after, Overmyer's quest to build WECO-TV hit a series of snags. The station was on target to launch in September when crews erecting its tower found that the anchor points for two of its three guy wires were over abandoned mine shafts, and a third such tunnel was also found. This forced a change of site for the tower and delayed the prospective launch date to June 1967. The delay prevented WECO-TV from being part of its owner's planned Overmyer Network, which went on the air as the United Network on May 1, 1967. Its lone offering, The Las Vegas Show, aired on WIIC-TV.

=== Sale to AVC ===
Needing financing to finish construction of WPGH-TV and the other station permits he held nationwide, Overmyer agreed on March 28, 1967, to sell 80-percent majority control of his construction permits to the American Viscose Corporation (AVC). One partner in the investment firm facilitating the sale with Overmyer was a stockholder in WPHL-TV, an existing UHF station in Philadelphia; another partner was appointed to the AVC board of directors after the sale. AVC arranged to merge the Overmyer permits with WPHL's parent company to form U.S. Communications Corporation on June 8, 1967, giving the combined company six television stations in the top 50 markets. (Note: In 1967, the American Research Bureau (ARB) ranked the size of the TV viewing audience for the six cities using net weekly circulation: Philadelphia, 4; San Francisco, 7; Pittsburgh, 9; Cincinnati, 16; Atlanta, 19; and Houston, 25.) The FCC approved the sale on December 8, 1967, waiving a proposed rule in place since 1965 that sought to limit television station ownership within the top 50 markets, a practice the FCC had employed before in similar transactions.

Days after the deal was approved, Rep. Harley O. Staggers, chairman of the House Investigations Subcommittee, summoned all FCC members to testify over the decision not to hold hearings. FCC chairman Rosel H. Hyde testified that if a hearing had been ordered, the sale would have been abandoned. Hyde stated, "I believe that the possibility of refinancing the UHF stations would have failed had we designated the matter for hearing" and that any hearing "...might very well have defeated this effort to salvage a sinking enterprise". Hyde concluded Overmyer's application was sufficient for approval and agreed with commissioner Kenneth A. Cox that the true nature of the transaction was to raise funds to save the warehouse business. Cox criticized the submission of out-of-pocket expenses and the loan and option agreement in the transaction, claiming it violated an FCC policy by providing a profit.

When the deal closed on January 15, 1968, Overmyer received the second $1.5 million portion of the total $3 million agreed to in the loan contract. AVC was an investment company with no experience in television broadcasting and thus only provided financing for U.S. Communications, while WPHL was used for leadership: two WPHL executives became part of U.S.'s management team. Overmyer's role was limited to only his 20-percent stock in the Atlanta, Pittsburgh, Cincinnati, and Houston permits, with no managerial oversight; U.S. also included a provision that could compel Overmyer to divest his 20-percent interest and an option to purchase it between January 16, 1971, and January 15, 1972. The contract limited the highest purchase price to $3 million, the same amount AVC had loaned to Overmyer; the loan was secured by second mortgages on twenty-three of Overmyer's warehouse properties and his 20 percent interest in the TV stations. U.S. never executed its option to buy the stock, and Overmyer repaid the $3 million loan.

=== Second on-air stint (1969–1971) ===
After the sale to AVC, planning moved forward in Pittsburgh. By July 1968, the firm was still scouting a site for channel 53, which would have a far more powerful signal than the old WKJF-TV. The station set up its studios, offices, and transmitter at 750 Ivory Avenue in the North Hills area; the Ivory facility had previously belonged to WENS. The Pittsburgh Ad Club held a contest to select new call letters to replace WECO-TV, taking the call sign WPGH on December 7.

WPGH-TV made its on-air debut on February 1, 1969—the first broadcast from channel 53 in nearly 15 years. Programs included a local version of Bozo the Clown; Dark Shadows and the CBS Sunday Night News, which the local affiliates did not or were about to cease airing; syndicated sports heretofore unavailable in Pittsburgh; and daily movies. Local programming included Duquesne Dukes men's basketball; Pittsburgh Penguins hockey; and an interview show, Pittsburgh Now.

U.S. Communications struggled with the station permits it had acquired from Overmyer and built out. In July 1970, WPGH-TV cut back its broadcasting day to start at noon on weekdays, 3 p.m. on Saturdays, and 1 p.m. on Sundays. The company's woes became more acutely felt in 1971. On March 31, due to financial problems, the firm shut down its stations in San Francisco (KEMO-TV) and Atlanta (WATL). On August 5, 1971, The Wall Street Journal reported that U.S. Communications had asked the FCC for permission to take WPGH-TV and WXIX-TV in Cincinnati off the air. The two stations, however, got a reprieve because they had instead attracted potential buyers. In the case of WPGH-TV, the reprieve was short-lived. On the afternoon of August 16, 1971, U.S. Communications informed the 48 employees of channel 53 that the station would cease broadcasting at 6 p.m., with the entire staff being laid off.

== Crosby and Meredith ownership ==
AVC began liquidating the U.S. Communications stations. With the February 1972 sale of WPHL-TV, the only station never threatened with closure, WPGH-TV became the last unsold station. It was instead assigned to a liquidating receiver. A Black-led group, Aquarius Broadcasting, investigated the purchase, but Leon Crosby emerged the winner in a November 1972 bankruptcy court hearing. Crosby, who also bought KEMO-TV in San Francisco from AVC, promised to program WPGH-TV as an independent station with a mix of movies, reruns, children's shows, and sports, as well as local program concepts that had been successful in San Francisco such as a Black variety show. Crosby and his company, Pittsburgh Telecasting, spent most of 1973 awaiting FCC approval; during that time, a tilt in the antenna was identified as a possible cause of signal reception issues in some areas. The commission granted the purchase on December 12, 1973. To get the station back into operating condition, rotting carpets had to be removed from the studio. WPGH-TV returned to the air on January 14, 1974. Like its prior incarnation, it picked up preempted network programs; this time, it added some morning programming from the Christian Broadcasting Network.

The Meredith Corporation purchased WPGH-TV for $12.2 million (Note: $11.7 million plus a $500,000 closing bonus if the sale closed prior to December 31, 1978, which it did.) in 1978. It was the company's first UHF independent station and second total after KPHO-TV in Phoenix. That same year, Pittsburgh gained a second independent in the form of WPTT-TV (channel 22), started by the Baltimore-based Commercial Radio Institute (predecessor to Sinclair Broadcast Group). Though the new UHF outlet initially eroded WPGH-TV's ratings, channel 53 easily beat the comparatively neglected WPTT-TV in the ratings, and when David D. Smith became its general manager in 1984, he readily conceded that even a revived WPTT would be "the fifth station in this market". WPGH-TV responded by becoming an aggressive buyer of programming including shows and movies, pushing costs up. In Meredith's final months of ownership, the station agreed to join the new Fox network when it started providing programming in October 1986. By this time, it was well-regarded in the industry.

== Lorimar-Telepictures and Renaissance Communications ownership ==
They [Meredith] recognized an opportunity to move on and we recognized an opportunity to move in. We just met at an intersection called Pittsburgh.

— Alan Bell, senior vice president, Lorimar-Telepictures

In July 1986, the Meredith Corporation agreed to sell WPGH-TV to Lorimar-Telepictures for $35 million. At the time, Lorimar—a production powerhouse responsible for shows like Dallas, The People's Court, and The Waltons—was breaking rapidly into station ownership with three stations owned and in the process of buying WPGH and eight other stations, including WTTV, an independent station serving the Indianapolis market. Meredith did not have WPGH-TV on the market, but the deal made sense; Pittsburgh was not the kind of growth market Meredith was seeking, while Lorimar found in the city an area that was undervalued nationally. In the months following the purchase's announcement, the independent TV station market soured; a number of stations sought bankruptcy protection, including WTTV, which Lorimar stopped pursuing. The purchase price was cut to $21.25 million by the time the deal closed in January 1987. Less than six months later, Lorimar-Telepictures decided to reorganize as a production company solely and divest all its television stations. The small-market holdings were spun off in a management buyout, while Lorimar gave itself 24 months to sell WPGH-TV.

Renaissance Communications, a company formed by Michael Finkelstein, agreed to purchase WPGH-TV in August 1988 for $30 million. Finkelstein was a stakeholder in Odyssey Partners and transferred its two independent stations—WDZL in Miami and WTXX in Connecticut—to the new business. WDZL and WTXX had similar programming philosophies. The new owners took control in January 1989. During Renaissance ownership, the station benefited from Fox's surging fortunes as a network and from a far more aggressive approach than that taken under former owners. The station rebranded as "Fox 53" and increased its spending on advertising, rebuilt its afternoon lineup to serve the unserved children's market, and earned notice as an increasing competitor to the traditional network affiliates.

== Sinclair ownership ==
=== A controversial purchase and sale ===
In January 1991, Sinclair Broadcast Group announced it would purchase WPGH-TV from Renaissance for $55 million. Sinclair already owned WPTT-TV, which it had to put up for sale. Speculation swirled that WPTT would switch to the Home Shopping Network (HSN). The buyer for channel 22 was Edwin Edwards, WPTT's station manager and a Black man. For Sinclair, the deal was a trade-up. WPTT-TV had never been a ratings success, and WPGH-TV was closer to Sinclair's cluster of Fox affiliates that included stations WBFF-TV in Baltimore and WTTE in Columbus, Ohio. There was a marked difference in financial performance between first-tier and second-tier independent stations, and cost-cutting was seen as useful to WPTT-TV, which had lost $26 million in its 14-year history.

Under the deal, Commercial Radio Institute, the Sinclair subsidiary that had owned WPTT-TV, held $1 million in Edwards's debt as a convertible debenture and received a tax certificate for selling the station to a minority. The deal as originally structured permitted Sinclair to convert that debenture into an 80-percent ownership interest. Mark I. Baseman, a Pittsburgh attorney, filed an objection to the two deals in March, believing the sales gave Sinclair too much influence over WPTT-TV and represented an impermissible duopoly. Baseman also objected to the switch of WPTT-TV to home shopping, which eliminated competition for WPGH-TV. Baseman later disclosed the objection was filed on behalf of a client, which was only revealed in January 1992 as ABRY Communications. ABRY owned WNUV in Baltimore, a competitor to Sinclair's WBFF-TV, and fretted that Sinclair was using its buying power in Pittsburgh to force syndicators to place their shows on WBFF-TV in Baltimore lest they be shut out altogether in Pittsburgh.

The FCC approved the WPGH-TV and WPTT-TV sales in June 1991, and when they closed, on August 30, WPTT switched to HSN on a full-time basis. Threatened by cable systems seeking to drop the all-HSN WPTT, WPGH and Sinclair agreed to purchase and program nine hours a day of airtime. The operating arrangement attracted FCC scrutiny, and litigation resulted from the double transaction. After the 1999 legalization of duopolies, Sinclair acquired channel 22—by this point WCWB and an affiliate of The WB—from Edwin Edwards.

=== Starting a news operation ===
Sinclair began planning in early 1996 to launch a 10 p.m. newscast for WPGH the next year. Pittsburgh, compared to some markets, had little history of 10 p.m. local news. When WTAE-TV signed on in 1958, it offered a newscast at 10:30 p.m., which was short-lived. Through the 1980s, WPGH-TV aired the Independent Network News with local cut-ins. In 1990, when Sinclair still owned WPTT-TV and was setting up news operations for its Baltimore and Columbus stations, it proposed launching a 10 p.m. newscast for which production would have been outsourced to a third party. In 1994, WPXI-TV started the Pittsburgh Cable News Channel (PCNC), a local cable service which offered a live 10 p.m. newscast. The news director, David Janecek, came from Sinclair's WLFL in Raleigh, North Carolina, a Fox affiliate with a 10 p.m. newscast. Janecek hired Carolyn Clifford, with whom he had worked in Raleigh, and John Huck, a former Headline News anchor. Most of the news team came from outside the market, with the notable exception of sports anchor Alby Oxenreiter, who joined from WTAE. On weekends, Olympic gold medalist Kurt Angle presented the sports. To accommodate the news department, the Ivory Avenue facility was extensively remodeled with the addition of a new three-story building to help house the 40 full-time and 10 part-time employees added in the expansion—a total investment of $3 million. The station needed to mesh the younger target viewer profile of Fox network programming with the older demographic of Pittsburgh TV viewers.

The Fox 53 Ten O'Clock News debuted on January 26, 1997, after Fox's presentation of Super Bowl XXXI. The program had a slow start; though it quickly put behind technical glitches that pockmarked its first showing, the newscast was seen as a ratings underperformer with a share of just 3 percent in the 10 p.m. hour. In the November 1997 sweeps, it attracted fewer viewers than the episodes of Coach the station had been airing prior to launching the newscast.

Sinclair installed a new regional manager, Stu Powell, to oversee WPGH, WPTT, and other stations in November 1997. Powell had been the general manager at WXIX-TV in Cincinnati when it launched 10 p.m. news in 1993, finding ratings success. The next year, Clifford was replaced with Sheila Hyland, previously of WTAE. The quality of the newscast was seen to have improved, and it extended to an hour in November 1998. The expanded newscast brought with it several new reporters. In 2001, the market gained a third 10 p.m. newscast on UPN affiliate WNPA, produced by KDKA-TV. However, Pittsburgh's appetite for news in that time slot continued to trail the national average. Ratings stalled, and while WPGH-TV led the pack at 5 percent, the total market share of WPGH and its competition was 9 percent where the leading early local newscasts in Sacramento, St. Louis, and Portland, Oregon—all similarly-sized TV markets—attracted that many viewers or more. News director John Poister believed an additional newscast would bolster the station's reputation, but Sinclair had no expansion plans.

=== News Central ===
Starting May 28, 2003, Sinclair converted WPGH-TV's news department into a hybrid operation utilizing the services of News Central, the company's national news and weather service operating from its headquarters in Hunt Valley, Maryland. The 10 p.m. newscast now combined local news segments, reported locally and presented by Hyland from Pittsburgh, with national and international news segments from News Central. Ten employees were fired, including weeknight meteorologist Matt Morano, and a new set was introduced to match the News Central set. The national weather center had already been supplying weekend weather reports to WPGH-TV since January.

Where WPGH's 10 p.m. newscast had commanded 7 percent of the viewership at that time in February 2003, the station's share declined to 4 percent a year later, while WNPA posted viewership gains. Station staff were frustrated because the same local reporting and sports staff, producing the same reporting, was being weighed down by the change in news format. The news director was fired and replaced. Ratings began to improve after the time devoted to segments from News Central was cut back in August 2005, with WPGH regaining its lead over WNPA, but by the end of the year, rumors were running hot that Sinclair was about to dismantle the operation altogether and have WPXI produce news for WPGH.

=== Newscasts from WPXI ===
The rumors turned into reality on January 11, 2006, when Sinclair announced that WPGH would produce its last newscast on January 27, with WPXI taking over production on January 30 from its studios. Alby Oxenreiter was hired by WPXI to work in its sports department, but most other staff were laid off by Sinclair. The PCNC newscast, which WPXI had continued producing, moved to 7 p.m.; the new 10 p.m. news on channel 53 was anchored on weeknights by WPXI's evening anchor team of David Johnson and Darieth Chisolm. In 2013, former CNN anchor Lisa Sylvester replaced Chisolm as the 6, 10 and 11 p.m. news anchor for WPXI.

For the first time since WPGH began airing local news in 1997, the news offering expanded beyond 10 p.m. on March 14, 2022, with the debut of Channel 11 News on Fox 53 at 6:30, replacing a second half-hour of You Bet Your Life with Jay Leno. On January 8, 2024, Channel 11 Morning News on Fox 53 debuted at 7 a.m. as an extension of WPXI's existing morning newscast.

On January 18, 2021, WPGH-TV began airing the Sinclair-produced The National Desk from 7 to 9 a.m. With the 2024 morning news launch, the station instead began airing TND at 6 and 8 a.m.

== Notable former on-air staff ==
- Tamsen Fadal – reporter, 1997
- Jay Harris – reporter, weekend anchor, weeknight anchor (1997–2003)
- Eleanor Schano – host of Good Day Pittsburgh and Pittsburgh Women '79 in the 1970s

== Technical information ==
=== Subchannels ===
WPGH-TV broadcasts from a tower on Ivory Avenue in the Summer Hill neighborhood of Pittsburgh. The station's signal is multiplexed:

Subchannels of WPGH-TV
Subchannel	Res.	Short name	Programming
53.1	720p	WPGHFOX	Fox
53.2	480i	Antenna	Antenna TV
53.3	480i	Charge!	Charge!
53.4	480i	ROAR	Roar
22.1	720p	WPNT CW	The CW (WPNT)

Broadcast on behalf of another station

WPGH-TV began broadcasting a digital signal on channel 43 on April 1, 2002. The analog signal on channel 53 was shut down on February 17, 2009, which had been the original digital television transition date. The station's digital signal continued to broadcast on channel 43. WPGH relocated its signal from channel 43 to channel 20 on December 6, 2019, as a result of the 2016 United States wireless spectrum auction.

In June 2020, WPNT converted to ATSC 3.0 (NextGen TV) operation, with its main channel broadcast in ATSC 1.0 format on WPGH-TV.
