= 1966–67 United States network television schedule (late night) =

These are the late-night schedules for all three networks for the 1966–67 season. All times are Eastern and Pacific.

The United Network launched in spring 1967 with its lone program, The Las Vegas Show. The show and network ended after one month and 23 episodes, most of which aired on CBS stations in areas where the United Network did not own a station.

NET is not included, as member television stations had local flexibility over most of their schedules, and broadcast times for network shows might have varied. ABC and CBS are not included on the weekend schedules because those networks did not offer late-night programs of any kind on the weekend.

Talk/Variety shows are highlighted in yellow, Local News & Programs are highlighted in white.

== Monday-Friday ==
-		11:00 PM	11:30 PM	12:00 AM	12:30 AM	1:00 AM	1:30 AM	2:00 AM	2:30 AM	3:00 AM	3:30 AM	4:00 AM	4:30 AM	5:00 AM	5:30 AM
ABC	Fall	Local programming or sign-off
ABC	Spring	Local	The Joey Bishop Show			Local programming or sign-off
CBS		Local programming or sign-off
NBC	Fall	11:15 PM: The Tonight Show Starring Johnny Carson				local programming or sign-off
NBC	January	local programming	The Tonight Show Starring Johnny Carson			local programming or sign-off
U (launched May 1, 1967)	Spring	The Las Vegas Show				local programming or sign-off
U (launched May 1, 1967)	June	Local programming or sign-off

== Saturday/Sunday ==
-		11:00 PM	11:30 PM	12:00 AM	12:30 AM	1:00 AM	1:30 AM	2:00 AM	2:30 AM	3:00 AM	3:30 AM	4:00 AM	4:30 AM	5:00 AM	5:30 AM
NBC	Fall	local programming	The Saturday Tonight Show / The Sunday Tonight Show			local programming or sign-off
NBC	January	local programming	The Weekend Tonight Show			local programming or sign-off

== By network ==
=== ABC ===
New Series

- The Joey Bishop Show

Not returning from 1965-66

- ABC's Nightlife with Les Crane

=== NBC ===
Returning Series

- The Saturday/Sunday Tonight Show
- The Tonight Show Starring Johnny Carson

New Series

- The Weekend Tonight Show *

=== U ===
New Series

- The Las Vegas Show *
