= Oliver Treyz =

American television executive (1918–1998)

Oliver E. Treyz
- Born: Oliver Ernest Treyz; April 23, 1918; Willowemoc, New York, U.S.
- Died: June 14, 1998 (aged 80); Englewood, New Jersey, U.S.
- Education: Hamilton College
- Occupation: Network television executive
- Years active: 1939–1967
- Spouse: Janet Treyz (deceased)
- Children: Donald C. Treyz; James Treyz

Oliver Ernest Treyz (April 23, 1918 – June 14, 1998) was an American network television executive. Treyz was best known as the president of the American Broadcasting Company. He was promoted from vice president to president in 1958 after the departure of James T. Aubrey. He served as network president until 1962.

During his two-year tenure as vice-president and his four-year tenure as president, Treyz was responsible for the creation of programs including Adventures in Paradise, Cheyenne, Hawaiian Eye, 77 Sunset Strip, Surfside 6, Maverick, The Rifleman and The Untouchables.

== Early life and early career ==
Oliver Ernest Treyz was born on April 23, 1918, in Willowemoc, New York to Harry August Treyz (September 25, 1889–May 26, 1959) and Martha née Davey (1891–1984). Treyz graduated from Hamilton College in 1939. After graduation, Treyz began his career in broadcasting working at a small radio station in Binghamton, New York. He then went to work at advertising agency BBDO. During World War II, Treyz served in the Army Air Corps.

After the war, in 1948, Treyz began his association with ABC as a presentation writer for the company's radio division. On November 2, 1953, he was named Director of the ABC Radio Network. Treyz left ABC in 1954 and became the founder and first president of the Television Bureau of Advertising, a trade group for local television stations.

== Tenure with ABC Television ==
On October 17, 1956, Treyz succeeded Robert E. Kintner (1909–1980) as vice-president of the television division of the American Broadcasting Company. Kintner stepped down as president due to, what was termed as, "a dispute over policy".

The next year on February 17, 1958, Treyz filled in and took over the seat as president of ABC. That position had been filled by Leonard Goldenson, at the time, the president of American Broadcasting-Paramount Theatres, ABC's former parent company, who took over after the sudden departure of former network president James T. Aubrey.

During his years as president on ABC, Treyz was responsible for the creation and production of several memorable shows of that era including Hawaiian Eye, 77 Sunset Strip, Surfside 6, Maverick, The Rifleman, The Untouchables, The Real McCoys and The Flintstones.

=== Bus Stop and resignation ===
Bus Stop premiered on ABC in October 1961. Several memorable episodes were produced during the show's single season run. But one in particular, A Lion Walks Among Us, was the end to Treyz's tenure as president of ABC.

The episode originally aired on December 3, 1961. It starred teenage heartthrob Fabian Forte and the synopsis of that episode was as follows: "Fabian plays a degenerate drifter capable only of deceit, betrayal and murder. To win acquittal of one charge of murder in the town, he had an affair with the D.A.'s alcoholic wife, and then used that to blackmail the D.A. Once released he killed his own lawyers. And in a perverse 'balance of justice', the D.A.'s wife then killed him."

The episode was highly criticized and caused great controversy due to its depiction and portrayal of what some called "graphic violence". The episode stirred so much controversy that 25 ABC affiliates refused to air the episode. The public outcry was so massive that, in January 1962, the Federal Communications Commission scheduled a congressional hearing to be headed by Senator Thomas J. Dodd.

Neither executive producer Roy Huggins, director Robert Altman or Goldenson were subpoenaed to the hearing. Instead, Treyz was summoned to the proceedings for his publicly known support to broadcast the episode. After an intense verbal exchange between Treyz and Dodd, the hearings eventually move on to Goldenson. The scandal brought so much shame to the network that Treyz was asked to step down from his position.

== The Overmyer years ==
In the summer of 1966, warehouse mogul Daniel Overmyer announced plans to create a fourth television network to compete against the Big Three television networks and to take the place of the failed DuMont Television Network. The network would be called the Overmyer Network. Overmyer hired Treyz to head the new network.

The Overmyer Network debuted as the United Network on May 1, 1967. Unfortunately, the network folded one month later and Treyz's chance to make a comeback also failed.

== Personal life ==
Treyz was married to Janet Treyz. They had two sons together; Donald C. Treyz (born 1949) and James Treyz (born 1952). He was widowed. Treyz, who suffered with alcoholism later in life, moved into the Actors' Fund Retirement Home in Englewood, New Jersey, in the 1990s. Treyz died June 14, 1998, of kidney failure due to prostate cancer at the age of 80.

He was survived by his two sons and two granddaughters. He is buried with his parents in Orchard Street Cemetery in Livingston Manor, New York.
