= TVB (disambiguation) =

TVB may refer to:

- In broadcasting
  - TVB Limited, formerly Television Broadcasts Limited (Hong Kong)
  - TV Belgrade, former name of Radio Television of Serbia
  - Television Bureau of Advertising (US)
  - The old acronym for "Televisión Boliviana" (Bolivian Television), today known as Bolivia TV.
- Others
  - Traffic Violations Bureau of New York State.
  - The Von Bondies, American rock band
  - Temagami volcanic belt, a geologic feature in Temagami, Ontario, Canada
  - Thermal Velocity Boost, an Intel microprocessor turbo boost technology
