= The Las Vegas Show =

American late-night talk show (May 1967)

- KOB-TV ad for The Las Vegas Show
- Genre: Late-night talk show
- Developed by: David Sontag
- Written by: Bill Dana; Jack Hanrahan; Jeff Harris; Bob Hinkley; Bernie Kukoff; Howard Leeds
- Directed by: Win Opie
- Presented by: Bill Dana
- Country of origin: United States
- Original language: English
- No. of seasons: 1
- No. of episodes: 23 (2 unaired)

Production
- Executive producer: David Sontag
- Producers: Jerry Goldstein; Howard Leeds
- Production locations: Hotel Hacienda, 3950 Las Vegas Blvd S, Paradise, Nevada
- Camera setup: Multi-camera
- Running time: 90 or 120 minutes

Original release
- Network: United Network
- Release: May 1 – June 1, 1967

The Las Vegas Show is an American late night television program broadcast during the month of May 1967 on the United Network. Hosted by comedian Bill Dana, The Las Vegas Show was intended to be the flagship of a planned fourth television network, but was the only program the network ever transmitted. As United's affiliates largely scheduled the program to air at different times, the length of the program also varied between 90 or 120 minutes. The Las Vegas Show was cancelled solely due to the financial failure of the United Network after one month, with 23 episodes broadcast and two unaired episodes.

== Overview ==
When entrepreneur Daniel H. Overmyer and former ABC president Oliver Treyz announced the creation of the Overmyer Network on July 12, 1966, plans were immediately drafted for eight straight hours of nightly programming, with a late-night program as the centerpiece, originating from Las Vegas. Overmyer's planned chain of UHF stations, including WDHO-TV in Toledo, Ohio, were to have been owned-and-operated stations, with New York City's WPIX-TV and Los Angeles's KHJ-TV signed as flagships. Due to a financial crunch in Overmyer's other businesses, he sold off majority control of the planned network in early March 1967 to a 14-person investor syndicate, which renamed it the United Network; the launch date for the late-night show was accordingly moved to May 1, 1967.

== Production ==
David Sontag was named as the show's executive producer; Sontag previously served as ABC's executive producer for specials and head of talent, and developed Shindig!. Bill Dana, a former writer for Steve Allen and a comedian best known for his José Jiménez character, was named as host of the program by late March. Dana signed a 13-week contract with United and was paid $8,000 per week. The show differed from NBC's The Tonight Show Starring Johnny Carson by having a regular repertory group of comedians and actors, no table, desk and couch arrangement for show guests, and pre-recorded interviews, all filmed live to tape weeknights at 9:30 p.m. local time. Sontag aimed the show for a younger audience than Tonight, whose audience was estimated to be 40 and older.

The program was the first of its kind to be telecast from Las Vegas. Originating at the Hotel Hacienda on the Las Vegas Strip, show regulars included Ann Elder, Pete Barbutti, Danny Meahan, Jo Anne Worley, Cully Richards and orchestra leader Jack Sheldon. A previously unused showroom in the Hacienda was converted into a 300-seat studio with the audience sitting at tables with access to free soft drinks; additional remote broadcast capability allowed the show to transmit from up to nine other hotels in the city. Writers for the show included Jack Hanrahan, Howard Leeds, Bernie Kukoff and Jeff Harris. Master tapes were transported to Acme Film Laboratories in Los Angeles prior to transmission over leased AT&T Bell System network lines.

== Broadcast ==
The United Network's carriage nationwide varied significantly. Up to 123 stations signed with the network by December 1966 specifically to carry Las Vegas, but multiple stations either dropped out or failed to sign on the air when Las Vegas debuted on May 1, 1967; (Note: For more, see United Network § Affiliate stations.) this included Overmyer's unbuilt KEMO-TV (channel 20), which was sold to American Viscose Corporation along with Overmyer's other unbuilt stations. Thus, the show never aired in San Francisco. Knoxville, Tennessee, ABC affiliate WTVK-TV (channel 26) could not use ABC's network lines to receive Las Vegas when The Joey Bishop Show debuted two weeks earlier.

The majority of United's affiliates were composed of existing "Big Three" affiliates, many of them with CBS as that network declined to launch a late-night show of their own. United affiliates with primary NBC affiliations either delayed Las Vegas to the late afternoon, aired it after Tonight or only on the weekends. Flagship WPIX aired Las Vegas on Mondays and Wednesdays at 11:30 p.m., and Thursdays, Saturdays and Sundays at 9 p.m. WGN-TV in Chicago aired the show at 12:35 a.m. on Wednesdays, Thursdays and Fridays, 10:15 p.m. on Saturdays, and 8 p.m. on Sundays. The Las Vegas Show was ultimately carried on 106 television stations but the affiliate base was regarded as "irregular" and "erratic".

An additional 32 television stations based in Latin America also reportedly signed up to carry the program.

== Guests ==
Guests that appeared on The Las Vegas Show included the following:

- Week of May 1, 1967: Milton Berle, Billy Daniels, Sarah Vaughan, Chad & Jeremy, Big Tiny Little, Rich Little, Della Reese, Julius La Rosa, Don Cornell, Helen O'Connell, Allen & Rossi, Abbe Lane, Dana Wynter, Frankie Laine, Fran Jeffries, Al Hibbler, Pat Morita, Molly Bee, Robert Clary, Jaye P. Morgan, Page Cavanaugh, Roberta Sherwood, Barbara McNair, Mel Carter, Sammy Shore, Rusty Draper, Tommy Leonetti
- Week of May 8, 1967: Sally Ann Howes, The Teddy Neely Five, Clea Bradford, Davis and Reese, Juliet Prowse, Anita O'Day, Gisele MacKenzie, Pat Henry, Sérgio Mendes, Nicholas Brothers, Jackie Gayle, Edith Head, Hugh O'Brian, Don Rickles, The Baker Twins, Harold Robbins
- Week of May 15, 1967: Mort Sahl, Dana Wynter, Carmen McRae, Helen O'Connell, Hank Grant, Tammy Grimes, Liberace, Rod Serling, Hugh Hefner, Elaine Dunn, Gretchen Wyler
- Week of May 22, 1967: Chita Rivera, Jennie Smith, Don Rickles, Tony Daryl, John Wayne, Gary Lewis & the Playboys, Earl Wrightson, Lois Hunt, Marty Ingels, Mary Grover, The Kingston Trio, Dave Barry, Marni Nixon, Eileen Brennan
- Week of May 29, 1967: Tommy Noonan, Damita Jo DeBlanc, Redd Foxx, Xavier Cugat, Charo, Don Cornell, Irwin Corey, Gilbert Price, Sue Ane Langdon, Tom Patchett & Jay Tarses
- Guest slated for June 1, 1967: Della Reese

== Reception ==
=== Critical reviews ===
Las Vegas was met with mixed reviews from critics. Jack Gould of The New York Times felt the debut episode to be "thin and strained" and said, "[t]o come up with 10 hours of variety a week is a staggering requirement that will require far more imagination, preparation and probably greater financial expenditure... the whole had the stamp of somewhat old-fashioned vaudeville." A later review by Gould called the show "indifferent variety, wanting in pace, cohesion and personality", adding that the remote broadcasts were "... disjointed and suggested a poor man's 'Hollywood Palace'." Scripps-Howard's Harriet Van Horne noted that, while Las Vegas's premiere on WPIX topped Tonight, Joey Bishop and The Merv Griffin Show, all three shows were outdrawn in the ratings by WCBS-TV's airing of The Incredible Shrinking Man. Dick Gray of the Atlanta Journal said Dana "... leaves me less than excited" but praised his show business knowledge and felt the show could be a success if production values were upgraded.

Robert Goldsborough of the Chicago Tribune was more receptive to Dana's "hesitant" on-air persona and saw the "endless parade of top talent moving steadily thru the gambling mecca" of Las Vegas as an asset, but was critical of the show's frequent commercial breaks. Variety viewed the excessive ads as detrimental to "a surprisingly posh program", saying they "made the Vegas end of [the show] seem mere wraparound for a Madison Ave. blurb festival ... as a kind of parallel McLuhanism, '[the] money is the message.'" Hal Humphrey of the Los Angeles Times concurred, saying, "The Las Vegas Show wasn't a show at all. It was a supermarket, and I've been in supermarkets where the box boys tell funnier jokes than were heard here Monday night." Hank Grant of The Hollywood Reporter praised Las Vegas as "... a potpourri that threatened to boil over with too much talent" while Kay Gardella of the New York Daily News called it "... a late-night jackpot ... [that] promises to be everything a TV late show should be."

=== Ratings ===
Las Vegas initially premiered to strong ratings, particularly in New York and Los Angeles, but experience a significant decline over the course of May 1967. Published reports showed Las Vegas ultimately falling to a fraction of a point nationally and at last place in New York with a 1 rating compared to Tonight's 12 rating, Merv Griffin's 6 rating and Joey Bishop's 3 rating. Bill Dana asserted the show had around 2.6 million viewers in some surveys, making it "perfectly sound" on cost-per-thousand measurements.

== Cancellation ==
United quickly lost money throughout May 1967 despite initial promise of Las Vegas being able to lure advertising during the first week. The timing for the launch was poor, coming at both the end of the traditional television season and in the last quarter for traditional advertising budget cycles. Direct response advertising was noticeable during the Memorial Day broadcast. In the last few days, Oliver Treyz made a direct on-camera appeal for potential sponsors, emphasizing the advertising rates for Las Vegas were a fraction of Tonight on NBC. The fees to use the AT&T Bell System lines also proved to be far too expensive with a monthly advance fee of $400,000.

After an executive board vote, the United Network shut down on Thursday, June 1, 1967. Network president Oliver Treyz sent a telegram to all 106 affiliates that United "ceased its interconnected program operations". Production staff was told following the previous night's taping that Las Vegas "would stop taping for awhile". Two additional shows had been pre-recorded for broadcast, which did not happen as affiliates were pressed into finding replacement programming within a matter of hours.

Bill Dana, who blamed the failure of United on the reluctance of ownership to provide it financial sustenance, mused, "At least I set a record. I'm the first man in history to sink an entire network." In a later interview, Dana said, "[i]t burns me when they say the Vegas show folded. It didn't. It was the network that folded and down went the show with it." Historian Hal Erickson wrote that "The Las Vegas Show [was] the first series in history to leave the air because its network was cancelled."
