= José Jiménez (character) =

Fictional character performed by comedian Bill Dana

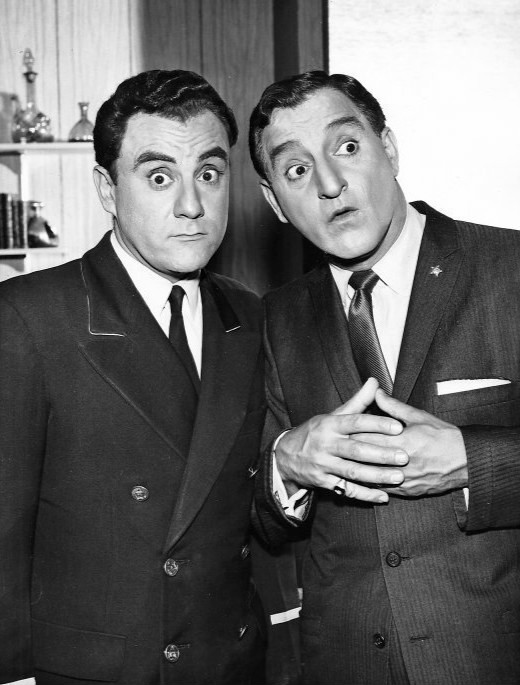
Dana as José Jiménez with Danny Thomas, 1961.

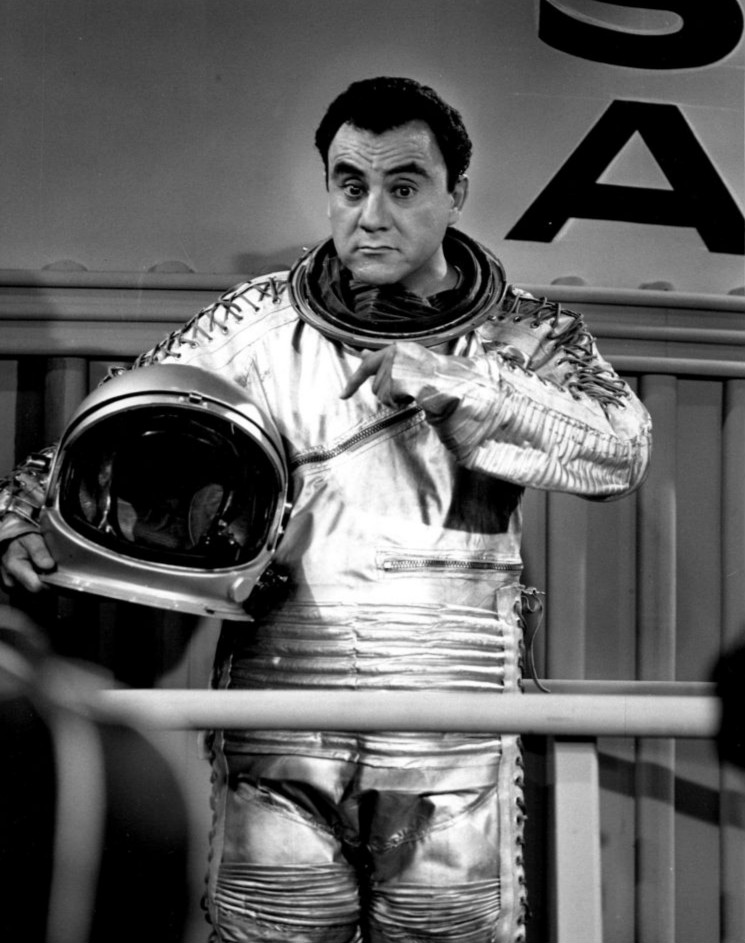
Dana as an astronaut, 1963.

José Jiménez was a fictional character created and performed by comedian Bill Dana on The Steve Allen Show in 1959 and who became increasingly popular during the 1960s. This character introduced himself with the catch phrase: "My name...José Jiménez". Dana played José in three non-variety shows: Make Room for Daddy, which spun off The Bill Dana Show, and a cameo in an episode of Batman ("The Yegg Foes in Gotham", October 20, 1966).

== Astronaut ==
During the course of his José Jiménez acts, Bill Dana (who was of Hungarian-Jewish ancestry, unlike the Bolivian character he played) took his character through various roles including elevator operator, sailor, and submariner until settling into the most famous occupation that José would hold: astronaut. An excerpt from The Ed Sullivan Show:

José Jiménez: "My name... José Jiménez."
Ed Sullivan: "Well, now I see you have some of your space equipment with you. Uh, what is that called, the crash helmet?"
José Jiménez: "Oh, I hope not."

Ed Sullivan: "Now, what do you consider the most important thing in rocket travel?"
José Jiménez: "To me the most important thing in the rocket travel is the blast-off."
Ed Sullivan: "The blast-off."
José Jiménez: "I always take a blast before I take off. Otherwise I wouldn't go near that thing."

The routine was later released as a double-sided single: "The Astronaut (Part 1 and 2)" made the Billboard charts, peaking at #19 in September 1961. Writer/producer Don Hinkley (who Dana had met when they were writers for the Allen show) played the part of the newscaster, asking José questions about his purported spaceflight. An LP, José Jiminez in Orbit (Bill Dana on Earth) (Kapp KL-1257), featuring similar routines, was issued in 1962.

The character of José Jiménez caught on with the seven real Mercury astronauts, and Dana became good friends with them: "Loud and clear, José, don’t cry too much!" Alan Shepard quipped as Gus Grissom’s Liberty Bell 7 launched, to which Grissom replied “Okie doke!”. José became the program's unofficial mascot, and Dana was even made an honorary Mercury astronaut. (Coincidentally, there was a real test pilot named Bill Dana, who flew as high as 59 miles up and qualified for NASA's Astronaut Badge.)

== Decline ==
As time passed, Dana realized that such ethnic humor was becoming offensive, and Hispanic groups began protesting Dana's portrayal of the dim-witted Hispanic character. In 1970, Dana announced to a Mexican-American cultural pride festival that "after tonight, José Jiménez is dead", later holding a mock funeral for José on Sunset Boulevard. In 1997, Dana received an image award from the National Hispanic Media Coalition.

== José Jiménez in popular culture ==
In the 1983 film The Right Stuff, Alan Shepard (played by Scott Glenn) is a fan of the character and uses the catchphrase in radio talk while piloting his airplane in for a carrier landing. Later he is warned by a very large, rather intimidating Hispanic medical aide (played by Anthony Muñoz) that the way he uses it is offending people, and he stops. Footage of the character's appearance as an astronaut on The Ed Sullivan Show was also seen in the film.

In the 1987 film The Pink Chiquitas, one of the characters reads a passage from a book describing an expedition by the "explorer" José Jiménez.

In his demo of the song "Wonderful Toys" written for the aborted Batman musical, Jim Steinman does a parody of Eminem, which includes the lines "My name is—my name is—my names is—José Jiménez!". The song is meant to be sung by The Joker.

In the Farscape season 4 episode, "Unrealized Reality", the lead character, John Crichton (who commonly quotes pop culture throughout his misadventures), experiences another possible reality of a scene from the first episode of the series. When asked his name, instead of saying John Crichton he replies, "My name José Jiménez."

In the television show Mystery Science Theater 3000, the puppet character of Crow uses the phrase "My name José Jiménez."

In the third episode of the HBO miniseries From the Earth to the Moon, called "We Have Cleared the Tower", someone mentions Bill Dana during the Apollo 7 pre-launch breakfast. This inspires Commander Wally Schirra (played by Mark Harmon) to recite some of José Jiménez's lines, to the great amusement of everyone at the table.

In a cameo appearance in the Get Smart episode, "Supersonic Boom", Dana alludes indirectly to Jiménez, in that his only line was "Sorry fella, don't speak Spanish. Boy, are you in the wrong neighborhood."

In season 4 episode 10 of The Larry Sanders Show, Arthur argues that José had been an inspiration to children because he was the "first Hispanic in space".

In the episode "Day One" of The Wonder Years, Kevin Arnold's teacher calls him, "a regular José Jiménez" when Kevin interrupts a class lecture. Earlier in the episode Kevin made a joke and embarrassed the same teacher.

In the Seinfeld episode "The Boyfriend", (season 3, episode 17), George Costanza goes to an unemployment office, where he nervously does an impression of José Jiménez.

Ventriloquist Jeff Dunham has performed with a pepper-shaped puppet named "José Jalapeño," described as "almost indistinguishable" from José Jiménez.
