= Bill Dana =

American comedian, actor, and screenwriter

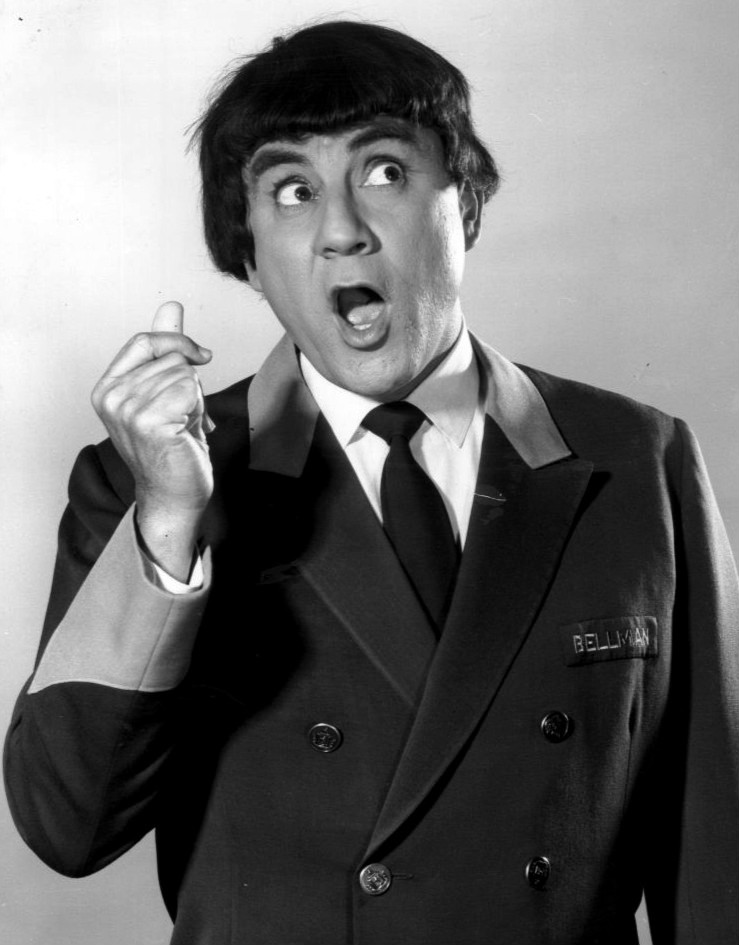
- Dana as his José Jiménez character, 1964
- Born: William Szathmary; October 5, 1924; Quincy, Massachusetts, U.S.
- Died: June 15, 2017 (aged 92); Nashville, Tennessee, U.S.
- Education: Emerson College (1950)
- Occupations: Comedian; actor; screenwriter
- Years active: 1954–1994
- Spouses: Maura McGiveney (m. 1972; div. 1972) Evelyn Shular (m. 1981)

William Szathmary (October 5, 1924 – June 15, 2017), known as Bill Dana, was an American comedian, actor, and screenwriter. He often appeared on television shows such as The Steve Allen Show, frequently in the guise of a heavily accented Bolivian character named José Jiménez. Dana often portrayed the Jiménez character as an astronaut.

== Early life ==
Dana was born William Szathmary in Quincy, Massachusetts, the youngest of six children born to Joseph and Dena Szathmary. He was of Hungarian Jewish descent. He took his stage name "Dana" after his mother's first name "Dena" as he felt "Szathmary" was unpronounceable.

Dana benefited from the expertise of an older brother, Arthur, who was fluent in several languages and gave his sibling his second entry into foreign languages. The first was growing up in a polyglot neighborhood where Spanish and Italian were among the languages spoken and having a Hungarian immigrant for a father. Another older brother was Irving Szathmary, composer of the Get Smart theme.

During World War II he served in the United States Army with the 263rd Infantry Regiment, 66th Infantry Division as a 60mm mortarman and machine gunner, as well as an unofficial interpreter. He was awarded the Bronze Star Medal.

== Career ==
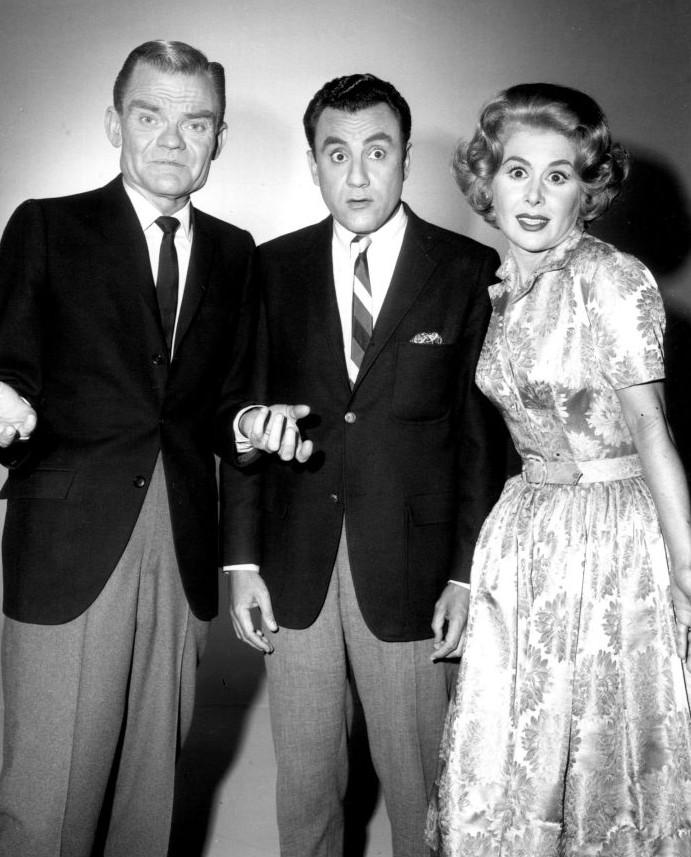
Spike Jones, Bill Dana and Helen Grayco, 1960

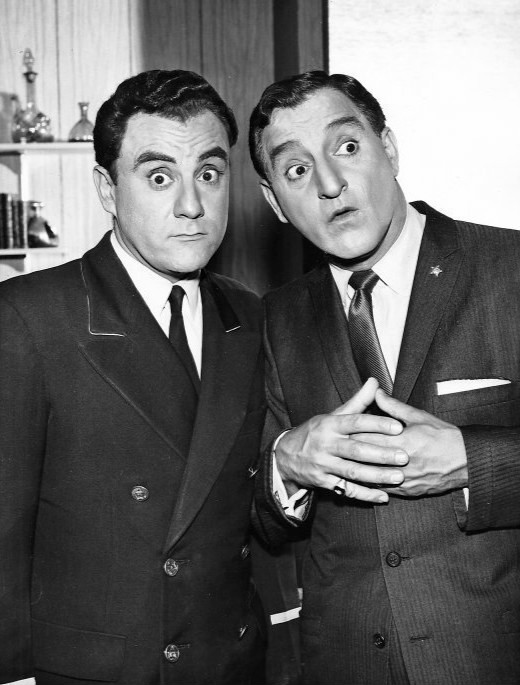
Dana on The Danny Thomas Show, 1961

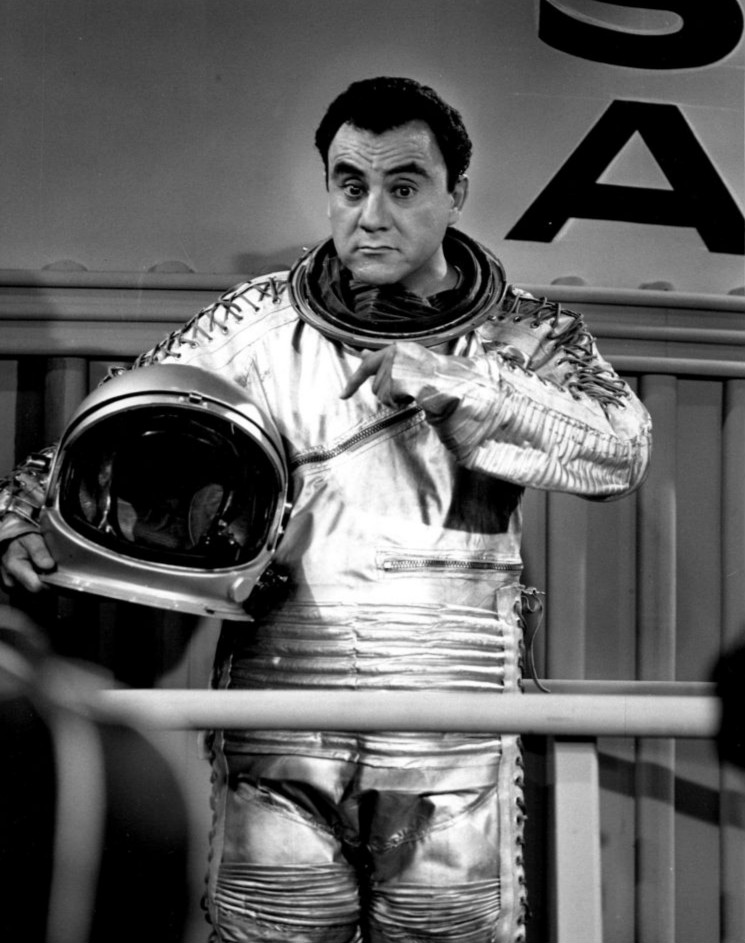
Dana as Jimenez the astronaut, 1963

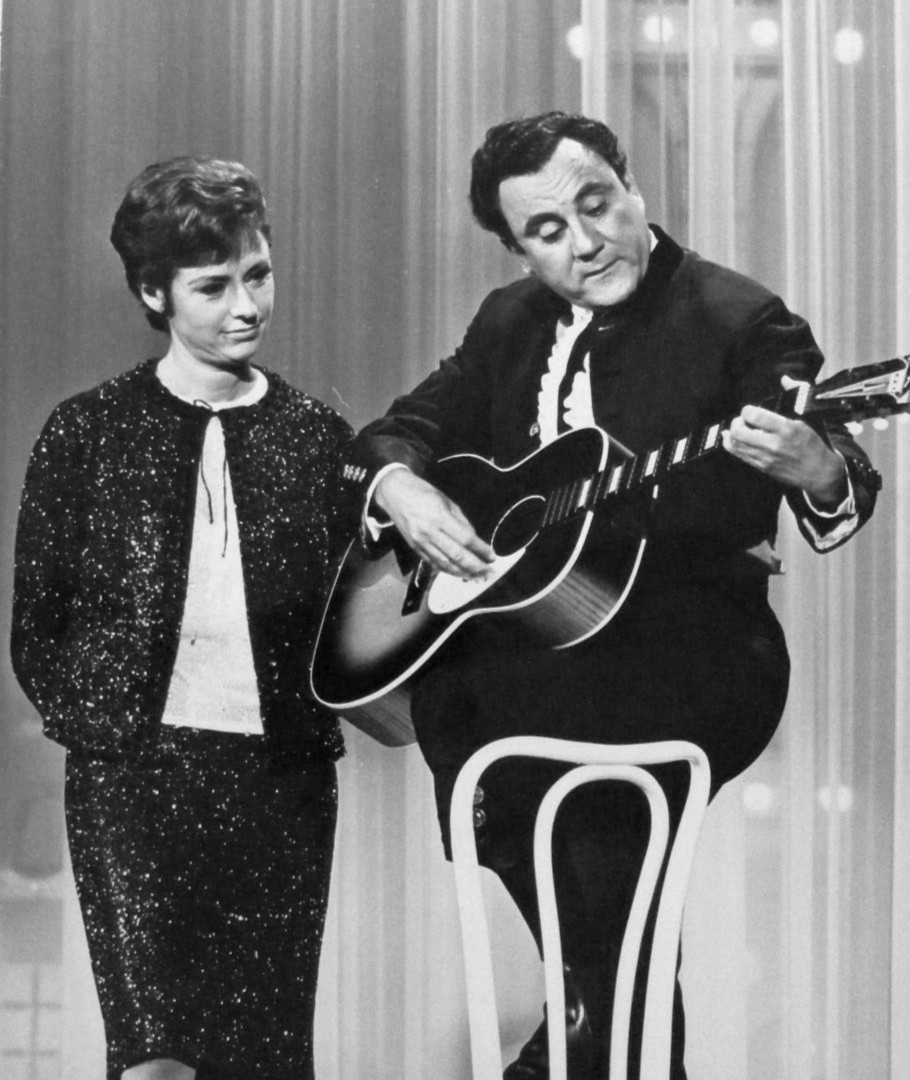
With Caterina Valente on The Hollywood Palace, 1965

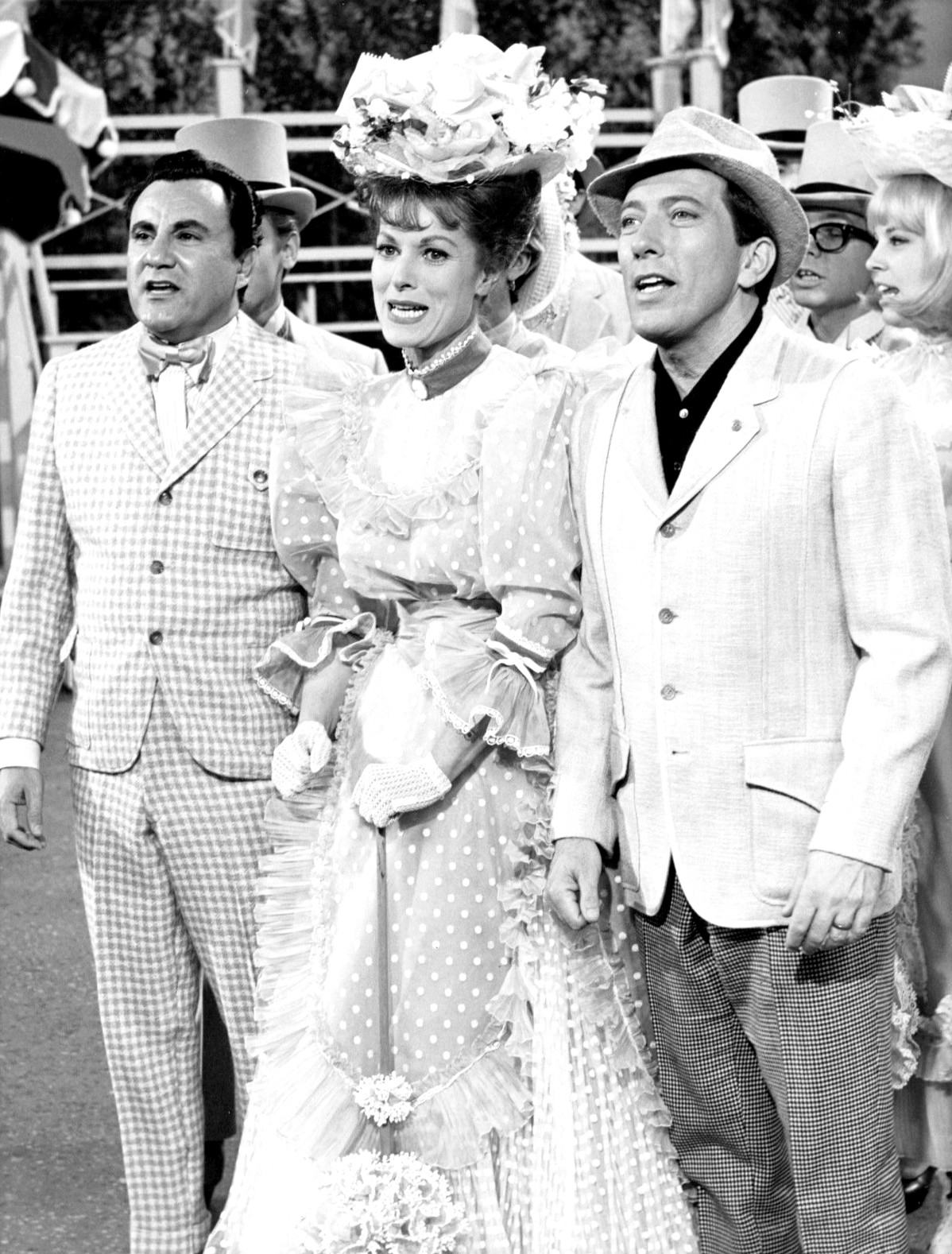
Dana, Maureen O'Hara and Andy Williams, 1965

Dana began his career as a page at NBC's Studio 6B while performing comedy in nightclubs around New York with partner Gene Wood. Starting in the 1950s, his appearances on television included The Imogene Coca Show and The Danny Thomas Show, as well as writing for and producing The Spike Jones Show.

Dana's career took a major turn when he began writing stand-up routines for the young comedian Don Adams (including the now well-known "Would you believe?" jokes later popularized by Get Smart (1965)). From there, he was brought in as a writer for The Steve Allen Show, where he created the José Jiménez character for the show's Man in the Street segments.

On an Ed Sullivan Show appearance, Dana related a story of how a woman recognized him on the street, but knew him only as José Jiménez, and asked what his real name was. Instead of his stage name, "Bill Dana", he gave her his real name, "William Szathmary". The woman rejoined: "Wow, no wonder you changed it to Jiménez!"

Dana had several comedy albums but only one that strictly featured the Jose Jimenez character. One of the cuts; "The Astronaut (Part 1 & 2)"...an interview from news reporter, writer and producer Don Hinkley...made it to the Billboard Top 40 charts at #19 in September 1961. Hinkley and Dana met as writers for the Allen show.

In 1961, Dana made the first of eight appearances on The Danny Thomas Show, playing Jimenez as a bumbling but endearing elevator operator. The character was so well-received that it was spun off into his own NBC sitcom, The Bill Dana Show (1963–1965). Jiménez was now a bellhop at a posh New York hotel. His snooty, irritable boss was played by Jonathan Harris. The cast also included Don Adams as a hopelessly inept house detective named Byron Glick; when the show was cancelled, Adams quickly used the Glick characterization as the basis for Maxwell Smart, and Get Smart premiered on NBC that fall.

Before appearing in front of a television camera for the first time on The Steve Allen Show in 1959, Dana had been a prolific comedy writer, an activity he continued into the 1980s, producing material for other actors on stage and screen. Dana co-wrote the script for the Get Smart theatrical film The Nude Bomb. His brother, Irving Szathmary, wrote the theme song for the Get Smart television series.

In 1966, Dana wrote the animated television movie Alice in Wonderland (or What’s a Nice Kid Like You Doing in a Place Like This?), in which he also supplied the voice of The White Knight (using his Jiménez voice). That same year, the Jiménez character was animated for the Paramount cartoon I Want My Mummy, written by Dana in collaboration with Howard Post. In 1966, Dana appeared uncredited in episode 48 of Batman playing José Jiménez, opening the window in the wall Batman was climbing and talking with him.

In May 1967, Dana hosted his own late-night talk show, The Las Vegas Show, on the new United Network. Originated live from the Hotel Hacienda in Las Vegas, Nevada, the program was canceled by the end of May when the United Network folded.

Joey Forman's 1968 parody album about Maharishi Mahesh Yogi, called The Mashuganishi Yogi ("mashugana" meaning crazy or bizarre in Yiddish), was produced by Dana, and includes a cameo of Dana as Jiménez, as well as a cover appearance. The album is a mock news conference, an extended question-and-answer session. The ersatz Bolivian–accented Jiménez asks the ersatz Indian-accented Yogi: "Why do you talk so funny?"

In 1970, responding to changing times and sensitivities, Dana stopped portraying the José Jiménez character; however, he played the character again on the 1988 revival of The Smothers Brothers Comedy Hour. Dana wrote the script for possibly the best known episode of the situation comedy All in the Family, entitled "Sammy's Visit", which featured Sammy Davis Jr. In 1976, he appeared in the "A Doctor's Doctor" episode of the NBC situation comedy The Practice as the hospital roommate of Danny Thomas's character Dr. Jules Bedford. In early 1979, he appeared as Sampson in the episode "Dewey and Harold and Sarah and Maggie" of the NBC series $weepstake$.

The José Jiménez character was part of several scenes in the 1983 film The Right Stuff. The government officials watch The Ed Sullivan Show before recruiting Navy pilots for the early’60s Mercury Space Program. Sullivan is talking to Jiménez. ("Is that your crash helmet?" "Oh, I hope not!") Later during medical testing, a large, Hispanic worker (played by NFL offensive tackle Anthony Muñoz) takes offense to Alan Shepard (Scott Glenn) mimicking the Jiménez character.

Although his film appearances were few, Dana had roles in a few movies including The Busy Body (1967), Harrad Summer (1974), I Wonder Who's Killing Her Now? (1975), and the aforementioned The Nude Bomb (1980). Dana would also have a recurring role on The Golden Girls as Sophia Petrillo's brother Angelo. He also played her father in a flashback. In addition, he played Wendell Balaban on Too Close for Comfort, as well as Howie Mandel's father on the series St. Elsewhere.

Dana reprised the role of Bernardo the servant on the CBS TV series Zorro and Son, but his performance was different from Gene Sheldon's pantomime counterpart on the 1950s live-action show. Both series were produced by Walt Disney Productions.

Dana died on June 15, 2017, at his home in Nashville, Tennessee, at age 92.

== American Comedy Archives ==
Bill Dana was integral in creating the American Comedy Archives, a series of audiovisual interviews with comic luminaries such as Phyllis Diller, Dick Gregory, Don Knotts, Norman Lear, Bob Newhart, Tom Poston, Paul Rodriguez, Dick Van Dyke, Betty White, and Jonathan Winters. The American Comedy Archives are housed at the Iwasaki Library at Emerson College, but transcripts of some interviews (Dana's included) have been made available on the library website.

== Filmography ==
Year	Title	Role	Notes
1967	The Busy Body	Archie Brody	
1967	An Italian in America	TV presenter	
1974	Harrad Summer	Jack Schacht	
1975	I Wonder Who's Killing Her Now?	Bobo	
1980	The Nude Bomb	Jonathan Levinson Seigle	
1988	The Golden Girls	Angelo	
1991	Lena's Holiday	Armenian Cabbie	
1992	Blossom	Himself	
