= United Network =

American television network (May 1967)

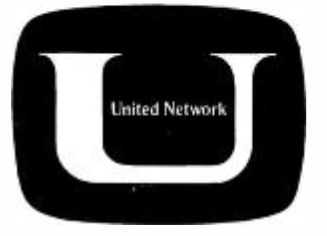
- Type: Television network
- Country: United States
- Affiliates: 106, including flagships WPIX-TV and KHJ-TV
- Headquarters: New York, New York

Ownership
- Owner: United Network, Inc.
- Key people: Oliver Treyz (president); Lewis Marcy (executive VP); Jack McGlothlin (chairman of the board)

History
- Founded: July 12, 1966
- Launched: May 1, 1967
- Founder: Daniel H. Overmyer
- Closed: June 1, 1967 (1 month)
- Former names: Overmyer Network (pre-launch, 1966–1967)

The United Network (commonly referred to as United; known prior to launch as the Overmyer Network or ON) was a short-lived attempt at a fourth television network in the United States that operated through the month of May 1967. Founded by Daniel H. Overmyer, a Toledo, Ohio, warehouse chain operator and television station owner, majority control of the network was sold by Overmyer to a 14-person syndicate weeks before it launched, resulting in the name change to the United Network.

Despite lofty plans outlined by network president Oliver Treyz, United's lone offering was The Las Vegas Show, a late-night talk show hosted by comedian Bill Dana. This program was successfully cleared in a majority of the nation's television markets; many United affiliates had existing primary affiliations with a Big Three network. Significant financial losses, poor timing, and a lack of overall advertising support prompted the network to shut down after only one month of operations.

== Formation ==
A second-generation warehouse owner, Daniel H. Overmyer had entered prominence in the field, owning and operating up to 260 buildings in 55 cities nationwide by 1965. By 1966, Overmyer successfully built and signed on WDHO-TV in Toledo, Ohio, owned the Toledo Monitor, a weekly tabloid paper, and founded Progress National Bank; he also secured construction permits for six additional ultra high frequency (UHF) stations across the country, joining existing UHF station WDHO.

The creation of the Overmyer Network was announced on July 12, 1966, with former ABC president Oliver Treyz hired as network president. In addition to Overmyer's planned UHF outlets serving as owned-and-operated stations, New York City station WPIX-TV, owned by Tribune Broadcasting, was signed up as the planned flagship. Los Angeles station KHJ-TV, owned by RKO General, was announced as the lead station for the West Coast; had KHJ-TV not signed, KBSA (channel 46), a station that had yet to sign on the air, (Note: KBSA did not sign on the air until August 16, 1972.) would have been designated as West Coast flagship. The network, abbreviated "ON" with the slogan, "Turn ON", was regarded as the first credible attempt at forming a fourth national network to join ABC, NBC and CBS since ABC's formal reorganization in 1953.

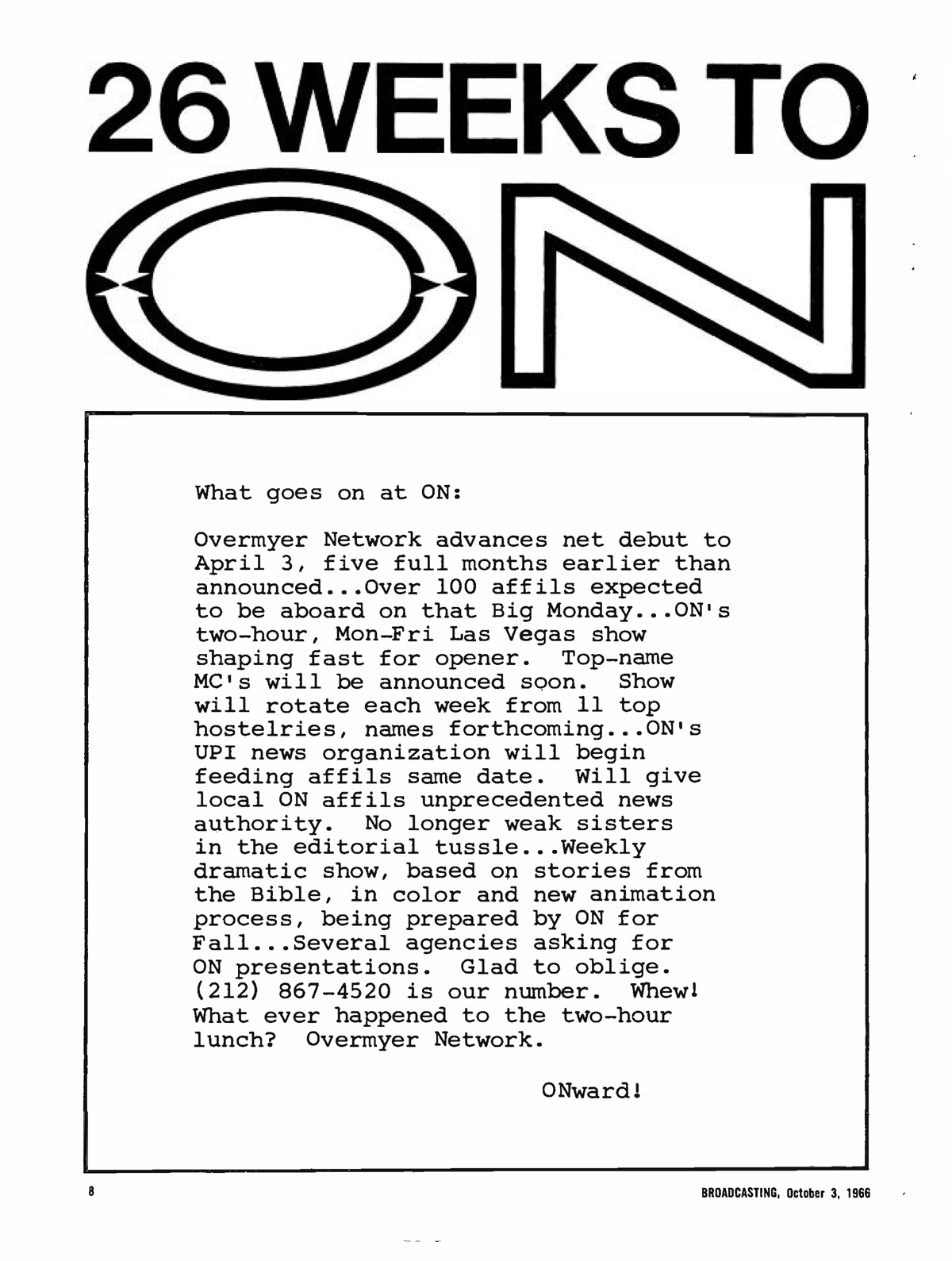
October 1966 trade advertisement for the Overmyer Network, promoting an April 3, 1967, launch.

Treyz envisioned ON supplying up to eight straight hours of evening programming to affiliates, including a prime time block devoted to different genres every night, two hours of newscasts supplied by United Press International (UPI), and a late-night talk show originating from Las Vegas, Nevada. Cultural and sports programming including Tales from the Great Book (an animated Bible series) and regional games of the Continental Football League were also planned, as was professional soccer. Lewron Television, a Baltimore, Maryland–based production company that provided mobile television facilities for ABC, CBS and NBC, was contracted to supply their facilities for the late-night show. By July 1966, 35 stations agreed to affiliate with the new network; this grew by October to 100 stations, 75 of which already agreed to carry the late-night show. The number of planned affiliates increased to 123 by December, including 24 of the largest 25 markets. Many of these new affiliates were existing CBS affiliates; after ON made the late-night show a priority, CBS declined to launch a late-night show of their own.

== Ownership and name change ==
Overmyer encountered numerous financial difficulties in late 1966, attributed largely to an overexpansion of his warehouse company. Construction of his warehouses was briefly halted after the lead contractor encountered financial distress, owing $18 million to shareholders; in response, Overmyer agreed to guarantee the contractor's $5–6 million debt. Overmyer also employed a large financial development staff for his warehouse arm that traveled across the country, resulting in substantial travel expenses and monthly airfare totaling $80,000 a month. Consequently, construction of the other UHF stations was delayed, with only the San Francisco (KEMO-TV) and Cincinnati (WSCO-TV) permits having any tangible progress to speak of. Overmyer sold off 80 percent majority control of these unfinished construction permits to American Viscose Corporation in exchange for a $3 million loan.

Overmyer announced the sale of 80 percent majority control in the network on March 5, 1967, to a 14-person syndicate led by three stockholders in the Mutual Broadcasting System: Jack McGlothlin, a Texas oil operator; Willard Garvey, a grain dealer, an oil investor and land developer; and James Nichols, a Texas advertising and public-relations executive. No money changed hands. By February 15, 1967, Overmyer encountered second thoughts over the feasibility of the network and realized the original projected April 3 launch date promised months earlier in trade advertising would not be met. Overmyer proposed to the Mutual board a merger with the Overmyer Network as a way to help finance production of the new late-night show until advertising revenue became more available. While the Mutual board rejected the idea, McGlothlin, Garvey and Nichols, were receptive and formed the syndicate. As part of the deal, ON was renamed the United Network and now had a launch date of May 1, 1967. The new date came after negotiations with Lewron that included a $60,000 rider inserted in their contract and the right for United to terminate with seven days' notice. Broadcasting called the transaction "a rescue mission ... [that] has saved the fourth television network from death in the womb." Overmyer also relinquished any managerial role or board seats with the network.

== Launch ==
Rechristened the United Network, the new network signed on the air on May 1, 1967, with The Las Vegas Show on 106 stations. Hosted by comedian Bill Dana from the Hotel Hacienda, the show featured regulars Ann Elder, Pete Barbutti, Danny Meahan, Jo Anne Worley, Cully Richards, and Jack Sheldon and aspired for a younger audience than NBC's The Tonight Show Starring Johnny Carson. The Las Vegas Show also debuted two weeks after ABC launched The Joey Bishop Show. Dana had a 13-week contract with United to host the show and was reportedly paid $8,000 per week. The primary focus on Las Vegas, coupled with changes to the network's distribution, delayed the UPI newsfeed to a September 11, 1967, launch. UPI merged their television news service with ITN earlier in the year to form UPITN, and United was to have been one of UPITN's first clients.

With Las Vegas derisively dubbed "Ollie's Follies" by industry insiders, United was described by Variety as a syndication service similar to Sports Network, but utilizing AT&T Bell System transmission lines—the main carrier for television network transmissions—to send programming on a regular schedule. United's affiliate base was regarded as "irregular" by Variety and retrospectively seen as "erratic". As the network was made up mostly of existing Big Three affiliates, The Las Vegas Show aired in tape delay in most markets; some NBC affiliates delayed the show to the late afternoon or aired it after Tonight. The show's airtime on WPIX varied during the week, which was also the case for WGN-TV in Chicago. The network also lacked clearance in some large cities, including San Francisco, which was waiting for KEMO-TV to sign on.

While initially debuting to strong ratings in New York and Los Angeles, Las Vegas experienced significant declines through the month of May 1967. By the third week, Las Vegas was ranked last in New York and reportedly fell to a fraction of a point nationally. Dana later said some audience surveys showed Las Vegas had an average viewership of around 2.6 million, a respectable number given the varied airtimes among the stations and competition against Tonight, Joey Bishop and The Merv Griffin Show.

== Financial distress ==
Despite the hype, the United Network quickly started to bleed money. AT&T's transmission lines proved to be too expensive: advance fees for the lines amounted to $400,000 per month and $7 million annually (equivalent to $67.6 million in 2025), with United paying for all eight hours despite using only two of those allotted hours. Under existing toll tariff rules, United was prohibited from subleasing these unused hours to another program service or for educational television, which drew the ire of New York Times columnist Jack Gould. After the network launched, Overmyer sold his nominal 20 percent stake back to the syndicate for $240,000 cash and a $115,000 promissory note. Two weeks into the network's operations, several members of the syndicate declined to have any further involvement with United, further burdening the remaining stockholders. H. L. Hunt and Howard Hughes were both approached as investors, but both rejected their respective offers, and another merger proposal with Mutual Broadcasting was reportedly rejected.

United also launched at the end of the traditional television season, which was also the last quarter for traditional advertising budget cycles, limiting the ability for blue-chip companies to become clients for the network, although companies like Colgate-Palmolive, General Mills and General Foods did emerge as advertisers. During the last days of operation, network president Oliver Treyz made an on-air appeal to potential sponsors, pointing out that air time on The Las Vegas Show was a mere $6,000 a minute, barely a third of what NBC was charging for The Tonight Show. Syndicated columnist Jack O'Brian reported these $6,000 rates were reduced further by up to two-thirds. Lewron was also not paid on May 22 and 29 and issued a telegram threatening to deny United usage of their facilities. Other columnists began to suggest United "is in financial trouble", had a "shaky" future, or was "dying", with O'Brian calling Las Vegas both "new and ailing".

== Closure ==
At least I set a record. I'm the first man in history to sink an entire network.

— Bill Dana, host of The Las Vegas Show, after the shutdown of the United Network

United's executive board voted to cease operations on Thursday, June 1, 1967, forcing affiliates to find replacement programming that same evening, some with only a few hours notice. (Note: Producers for The Las Vegas Show told the Associated Press two additional installments had been taped in advance prior to the shutdown, but it is unlikely those shows ever aired.) One station, WREC-TV in Memphis, Tennessee, which carried Las Vegas at midnight, opted to sign-off at that time. Las Vegas was cancelled after 23 episodes; production staff was notified after the previous night's taping that the show "would stop taping for awhile". Financial losses for the network's investors totaled $2.2 million (equivalent to $21.2 million in 2025) from a starting capital of $10 million. Las Vegas executive producer David Sontag said United needed up to $8 million more in order to sustain further production of the program.

A notice was sent to the network's 107 affiliate stations on June 1, 1967, which stated:

The executive committee of our board of directors, instructed me to inform you that with deep regret we are obliged to advise you that the United Network ceased its interconnected program operations as of May 31, 1967.

Please be advised that the United Network staff has done everything possible in connection without [sic] efforts to plan and launch the Las Vegas program and other United Network endeavors.

Station co-operation has been magnificent. We are indeed indebted to you for all your help. Regretfully, Oliver Treyz.

United filed for bankruptcy on June 22, 1967, having accrued a debt of $690,000. Creditors included Chase Manhattan Bank, Texas Bank and Trust, Overmyer Network and Productions, and Bill Dana. Treyz left at the end of June. Managing director James Nichols expressed hope to resume United's operations within two months, saying the network did not fold but dropped all programming while undergoing a reorganization. Nichols retained Robert Pauley, formerly of ABC Radio, to serve as United's future president. Minority shareholder Willard Garvey planned to incorporate a new company named Detinu, Inc. (United spelled backward), to "precede development of a fourth nationwide television network".

By September 1967, Nichols announced United would relaunch with seven hours of news and public affairs per week, transmitted between 2 a.m. and noon when AT&T fees were lowest. Pauley "severed ties" with United's investor team the following month and established Independent Broadcasting Co., which like United would provide news and public affairs, including content from Pathé News, to affiliates. This network also failed to materialize and Pauley was eventually hired as president of Mutual Broadcasting. (Note: Pauley's concept of a syndicator of television news and public affairs would eventually be realized with Television News Inc. in 1973, backed by Joseph Coors of the Coors Brewing Company and with Pauley as the founding chief executive officer.) Pete Barbutti told the Omaha World-Herald in a January 1968 interview any plans to revive United or Las Vegas were "quite unlikely" as ownership decided to write-off the network for tax purposes.

Lewron Television sued both the network and Overmyer for $117,000 in unpaid rental bills, half of what had been owed to them under their contract; Overmyer was included because of his past status as a minority owner. While Overmyer was initially found liable of up to $53,683 in a summary judgment, this was later reversed on appeal. The lawsuit against United was decided on May 8, 1972, with the network owing the firm $13,326.86.

== Legacy ==
WPIX president Fred Thrower called United "a valiant attempt" and said "it's a shame it didn't work... to ask for a success in five weeks was too much. If the backers of the network didn't intend to give it sustenance until it found its place they shouldn't play in this league with peanuts." Bill Dana expressed frustration over United's management and finances, telling an Associated Press reporter, "this appears to be the definite case of 'the operation was a success, but the patient died'. I can only ascribe the failure of the enterprise to the consummate naivete on the part of the backers. The whole thing went against all principles of sound fiscal policy. Even if you open a candy store, you should have enough capitalization to last more than three or four weeks." Overmyer said after the shutdown, "I am sorry. I still think a fourth network is necessary and maybe a fifth as time goes by."

Jack Gould mused in his Times column at the end of 1967 that United's failure was "further evidence that expansion of commercial TV is little more than a pipe dream". In a February 1969 column on recent attempts at a fourth television network (including DuMont, NTA and a Pat Weaver effort), Newspaper Enterprise Association media critic Joan Crosby deemed United "the latest, and most noteworthy fiasco ... that barely lasted long enough for the first commercial". Industry spokesmen described United to Crosby as "a promotion stunt" and "a fraud". Homer Brickey of the Toledo Blade later called the network "a victim of the Overmyer cash crunch" and claimed Treyz "slid into oblivion and reportedly became a bum on the streets of New York City." Historian Hal Erickson wrote that "... the United Network came to an end—making The Las Vegas Show the first series in history to leave the air because its network was cancelled."

== Affiliate stations ==
A two-page advertisement published on the April 3, 1967, issue of Broadcasting magazine listed all the planned affiliates for the United Network. Prior to that, the December 5, 1966, issue of Broadcasting listed planned all the affiliates for the Overmyer Network, 123 in total. In some markets, a different station was the affiliate due to the planned station not yet signing on. Overmyer's KEMO-TV (channel 20) was listed as an affiliate in both lists, but it was not on air until April 1, 1968; as a result, The Las Vegas Show did not air in San Francisco.

A blue background indicates a station only included in the April 3, 1967, list.

United Network affiliates
Station	Channel	Primary affiliation	City of license	Refs	Notes
WHNT-TV	19	CBS	Huntsville, AL		
WKRG-TV	5	CBS	Mobile, AL		
WCOV-TV	20	CBS	Montgomery, AL		(Note: WKAB-TV (channel 32, ABC) was announced as the Montgomery, Alabama, affiliate in both the December 5, 1966, and April 3, 1967, lists.)
KPHO-TV	5	Independent	Phoenix, AZ		
KZAZ-TV	11	Independent	Tucson, AZ		
KBAK-TV	29	CBS	Bakersfield, CA		
KHJ-TV	9	Independent	Los Angeles, CA		
KLOC-TV	19	Independent	Modesto, CA		
KFMB-TV	8	CBS	San Diego, CA		(Note: KOGO-TV was announced as the San Diego affiliate in the December 5, 1966, list.)
KICU-TV	43	Independent	Visalia, CA		
KKTV	11	CBS	Colorado Springs, CO		
KWGN-TV	2	Independent	Denver, CO		
KREX-TV (Note: Including satellites KREY (Montrose) and KREZ (Durango).)	5	CBS	Grand Junction, CO		
WTIC-TV	3	CBS	Hartford, CT		
WTTG	5	Independent	Washington, D.C.		
WTVX	34	CBS	Fort Pierce, FL		
WJXT	4	CBS	Jacksonville, FL		
WTVJ	4	CBS	Miami, FL		
WDBO-TV	6	CBS	Orlando, FL		
WLCY-TV	10	ABC	Tampa–St. Petersburg, FL		(Note: WTVT was announced as the Tampa–St. Petersburg affiliate in the December 5, 1966, list.)
WAGA-TV	5	CBS	Atlanta, GA		(Note: Overmyer's WBMO-TV (channel 36) was listed as the Atlanta affiliate in the December 5, 1966, list.)
WRBL	3	CBS	Columbus, GA		
WCIA	3	CBS	Champaign, IL		
WGN-TV	9	Independent	Chicago, IL		
WMBD-TV	31	CBS	Peoria, IL		
WREX-TV	13	ABC	Rockford, IL		
WHBF-TV	4	CBS	Rock Island, IL		
WLWI	13	ABC	Indianapolis, IN		(Note: WTTV was announced as the Indianapolis affiliate in the December 5, 1966, list.)
WNDU-TV	16	NBC	South Bend, IN		
WTHI-TV	10	CBS	Terre Haute, IN		
KTVC	6	CBS	Ensign, KS		
KLOE-TV	10	CBS	Goodland, KS		
KAYS-TV	7	CBS	Hays, KS		
KTVH	12	CBS	Hutchinson–Wichita, KS		
KNOE-TV	8	CBS	Monroe, LA		
WVUE-TV	12	ABC	New Orleans, LA		(Note: While WVUE was announced as the New Orleans affiliate in the December 5, 1966, list, WWOM-TV (channel 26, independent) was announced as such in the April 3, 1967, list; WWOM-TV was not on air until October 14 of that year.)
KSLA	12	CBS	Shreveport, LA		
WMET-TV	24	Independent	Baltimore, MD		
WHDH-TV	5	CBS	Boston, MA		
WKBD-TV	50	Independent	Detroit, MI		(Note: WJBK-TV (channel 2, CBS) was announced as the Detroit, Michigan, affiliate in the December 5, 1966, and April 3, 1967, lists.)
WKZO-TV	3	CBS	Kalamazoo, MI		
WJIM-TV	6	CBS	Lansing, MI		(Note: Could not carry all of the show because of Daylight Saving Time–related issues. The state legislature had just moved to exempt Michigan from DST.)
WKNX-TV	25	CBS	Saginaw, MI		
KDAL-TV	3	CBS	Duluth, MN		
WCCO-TV	4	CBS	Minneapolis–St. Paul, MN		
WABG-TV	6	ABC	Greenwood, MS		
KODE-TV	12	CBS	Joplin, MO		
KCMO-TV	5	CBS	Kansas City, MO		
KSD-TV	5	NBC	St. Louis, MO		(Note: KPLR-TV (channel 11, independent) was announced as the St. Louis affiliate in both the December 5, 1966, and April 3, 1967, lists.)
KMTV	3	NBC	Omaha, NE		(Note: Not on the April 3, 1967, list.)
KLAS-TV	8	CBS	Las Vegas, NV		
KOLO-TV	8	CBS	Reno, NV		
KOB-TV	4	NBC	Albuquerque, NM		(Note: Aired the program in late afternoons.)
WBEN-TV	4	CBS	Buffalo, NY		
WPIX	11	Independent	New York City, NY		(Note: Flagship station.)
WHEC-TV	10	CBS	Rochester, NY		
WHEN-TV	5	CBS	Syracuse, NY		
WCCB	18	Independent	Charlotte, NC		(Note: WBTV (channel 3, CBS) was announced as the Charlotte, North Carolina, affiliate in both the December 5, 1966, and April 3, 1967, lists.)
WFMY-TV	2	CBS	Greensboro, NC		
WNCT-TV	9	CBS	Greenville, NC		
KXJB-TV	4	CBS	Fargo–Valley City, ND		
KXMB-TV	12	CBS	Bismarck, ND		
KXMC-TV	13	CBS	Minot, ND		
KDIX-TV	2	CBS	Dickinson, ND		
WAKR-TV	23	ABC	Akron, OH		
WCPO-TV	9	CBS	Cincinnati, OH		
WEWS-TV	5	ABC	Cleveland, OH		(Note: Carried Las Vegas on Friday nights after Joey Bishop, Saturday nights and Sunday afternoons.)
WDHO-TV	24	Independent (Note: Station had no primary affiliation but aired NBC and CBS network shows not otherwise cleared in Toledo.)	Toledo, OH		
KWTV	9	CBS	Oklahoma City, OK		
KTVM	5	CBS	Medford, OR		
KOIN-TV	6	CBS	Portland, OR		
WSEE-TV	35	CBS	Erie, PA		
WHP-TV	21	CBS	Harrisburg, PA		
WPHL-TV	17	Independent	Philadelphia, PA		
WIIC-TV	11	NBC	Pittsburgh, PA		(Note: The December 5, 1966, and April 3, 1967, lists contain Overmyer's WECO-TV (channel 53) instead, but it was not on air by the time the show was to air.)
WCSC-TV	5	CBS	Charleston, SC		
WOLO-TV	25	ABC	Columbia, SC		
WSPA-TV	7	CBS	Spartanburg, SC		
KXAB-TV	9	NBC	Aberdeen, SD		
WDEF-TV	12	CBS	Chattanooga, TN		
WBBJ-TV	7	CBS	Jackson, TN		
WREC-TV	3	CBS	Memphis, TN		
WLAC-TV	5	CBS	Nashville, TN		(Note: WSIX-TV (channel 8, ABC) was announced as the Nashville affiliate in both the December 5, 1966, and April 3, 1967, lists.)
KFDM-TV	6	CBS	Beaumont, TX		
KZTV	10	CBS	Corpus Christi, TX		(Note: Both the December 5, 1966, and April 3, 1967, affiliate lists include KVER in Laredo, a station on channel 13 planned to rebroadcast KZTV.)
KRLD-TV	4	CBS	Dallas–Fort Worth, TX		
KROD-TV	4	CBS	El Paso, TX		
KPRC-TV	2	NBC	Houston, TX		
KTRE	9	ABC	Lufkin, TX		
KOSA-TV	7	CBS	Odessa, TX		
KCTV	8	CBS	San Angelo, TX		
KENS-TV	5	CBS	San Antonio, TX		
KAUZ-TV	6	CBS	Wichita Falls, TX		
KSL-TV	5	CBS	Salt Lake City, UT		
WTAR-TV	3	CBS	Norfolk, VA		
WTVR-TV	6	CBS	Richmond, VA		
WDBJ	7	CBS	Roanoke, VA		
KVOS-TV	12	CBS	Bellingham, WA		
KXLY-TV	4	CBS	Spokane, WA		
KTNT-TV	11	Independent	Tacoma–Seattle, WA		
WBAY-TV	2	CBS	Green Bay, WI		
WISN-TV	12	CBS	Milwaukee, WI		
WSAU-TV	7	CBS	Wausau, WI		
WAPA-TV	4	Independent	San Juan, PR		
WSVI	8	ABC	Christiansted, St. Croix, USVI		

Some listed affiliates did not carry the show:

- KRNT-TV (channel 8, CBS), Des Moines, Iowa
- WABI-TV (channel 5, CBS), Bangor, Maine
- WMTW (channel 8, ABC) Portland, Maine
- WAGM-TV (channel 8, ABC) Presque Isle, Maine
- WWTV (channel 9, CBS), Cadillac, Michigan, and satellite WWUP in Sault Ste. Marie, Michigan
- KTTS-TV (channel 10, CBS), Springfield, Missouri
- KTXL (channel 40), Sacramento, California; signed on October 26, 1968
- WLYH-TV (channel 15, CBS), Lebanon, Pennsylvania
- WBTW (channel 13, CBS), Florence, South Carolina
- WISC-TV (channel 3, CBS), Madison, Wisconsin
- WOAY-TV (channel 4, ABC), Oak Hill, West Virginia
- WTVK (channel 26, ABC), Knoxville, Tennessee; could not use ABC network lines to receive the program once Joey Bishop was scheduled as its competition

The following stations were listed as affiliates in the December 5, 1966, list and had no market replacement:

- KHSL-TV (channel 12, CBS), Chico–Redding, California
- KIEM-TV (channel 3, CBS), Eureka, California
- WCTV (channel 6, CBS), Tallahassee, Florida
- WINK-TV (channel 11, CBS), Fort Myers, Florida
- WBJA-TV (channel 34, ABC), Binghamton, New York
- KOTI-TV (channel 2, ABC), Klamath Falls, Oregon
- WSBA-TV (channel 43, CBS), York, Pennsylvania
- WDXI-TV (channel 7, ABC and CBS), Jackson, Tennessee
- WJHL-TV (channel 11, CBS), Johnson City, Tennessee
- KFDA-TV (channel 10, CBS), Amarillo, Texas, and satellites KFDW-TV in Clovis, New Mexico, and KFDO-TV in Sayre, Oklahoma

Affiliates negotiated with the network but did not come through nor finalized:

- KTXS-TV (channel 12, CBS), Abilene, Texas
