= Airfare =

Passenger fee for air transport

An airfare (otherwise known as a fare) is the fee paid by a passenger for air transport. It consists of the charge for a passenger to fly from an origin to a destination and includes the conditions, rules, and restrictions for travelling on the airfare.

Airfares are typically made up of fare and rule components that define the airfare product, services, and price and include origin/destination pair, fare class, one-way/round-trip indicator, fare amount, validity dates, mileage, and other rules. To sell the airfares many airlines rely on inventory allocations within finite, alphabetically defined sub-groups – "inventory buckets" – and fare codes for each fare sold. Airlines have sold airfares in this way since the beginning of commercial air travel and before computer reservations systems existed. As new computerized systems were gradually introduced to the air transport industry in the 1960s, this method of defining airfares and managing them within fare codes was further developed, and usage became widespread.

Evolving business models (such as low-cost carriers), changing consumer needs, and internet-age technologies such as more flexible shopping and booking technology are allowing airlines to price and distribute their products in new ways.

== Fare class ==
A fare class (otherwise known as booking class) is an airline industry term that indicates travel class and refers to the quality of seat, cabin, or other characteristics of the class of travel. Fare classes are used by most airline reservations systems and revenue management departments to divide every seat on a plane into different categories, each with its own price and set of rules.

== Fare filing ==
More than 450 airlines publish in excess of more than 100 million airfares through the airline-owned airfare database Airline Tariff Publishing Company (ATPCO) for onward distribution to Global Distribution Systems (GDSs) and third-party retailers. ATPCO has been a critical component in airline distribution for more than 50 years. The process of filing fares is manual and requires data entry of fares, fare rules, prices, and taxes into the ATPCO database.

== Fare code ==
Fare codes (otherwise known as booking codes or reservation booking designators (RBD)) are used in reservation transactions to specify the class of service a passenger should be booked to receive the fare, and functions also as an inventory control code.

Some fare codes are standard across all airlines, while some are very different depending on the airline. For example, a plane may have 25 economy seats still available, and the airline may show them in a reservation system as Y7 K5 M4 T6 E3, which indicates how many of each booking class can be reserved. Agents cannot sell some codes, and those seats may be reserved for international connections, loyalty programs, or airline staff relocation.

Fare codes were defined by IATA, but airlines have deviated from the IATA standard and current booking codes are airline-specific. The same code may have different meanings for tickets issued by different airlines. Many airlines use nearly all letters of the alphabet to support yield management. Certain booking codes have retained the same meaning across most airlines:

Fare codes
Fare Code	Meaning
F	full-fare First class, on airlines with first-class distinct from business class.
J	full-fare Business class
W	full-fare Premium economy
Y	full-fare Economy class

== Fare rule ==
Fare rules provide the detailed terms, conditions, and services for which fare classes are offered. In the case of pre-filed fares in ATPCO, the fare rule can refer to regulations governing published fares (grouped by categories) or to fares that are contained in the text of a rule (Fare By Rule).

== Difference between fare code and fare basis code ==
A fare code (or booking code, or reservation booking designator) is identified by one or two letters.

A fare basis code (often just referred to as a fare basis) can be 1-8 alphanumeric characters and is used to determine the price and restrictions on a ticket. Fare basis codes start with a letter called a fare code which almost always matches the booking class in which the reservation is booked.

Example:

Fare basis code WH7LNR tells us the following:

- W: I have a W booking class ticket (= Fare Code)
- H: It's a high-season ticket.
- 7: I have to book 7 days in advance.
- L: It's a long-haul flight.
- NR: The ticket is non-refundable.

== Dynamic (Airfare) Pricing ==
Current airline pricing is based on standards based on technology that is more than 50 years old. This technology statically defines products and restricts airlines to 26 price points. The limited number of price points leads to unnecessary price jumps that are not beneficial for either customers or airlines. Many airlines are looking to overcome the disadvantages of current airline pricing and allow more prices to better serve customer demands.

Many airlines are implementing Dynamic Pricing (sometimes referred to as Dynamic Offers). Dynamic pricing is the automatic adjustment of a starting price based on data insights to optimize revenue and customer uptake. Starting price data can come from any number of sources – ranging from Revenue Management (RM) systems to ATPCO filed fares

An example of Dynamic Pricing is "continuous pricing" implemented by Lufthansa Group.
