= Television Bureau of Advertising =

American nonprofit association

Television Bureau of Advertising (TVB)
- Founded: 1954, New York, NY
- Headquarters: New York City
- Area served: United States
- Key people: Brad Seitter; President & CEO
- Website: www.tvb.org

Founded in 1954, the Television Bureau of Advertising (TVB) is a private not-for-profit trade association for the commercial local broadcast television industry in the United States.

TVB's members include U.S. TV stations, broadcast ownership groups, ad sales rep companies, syndicators and associate members. TVB advocates for advertising on local broadcast TV and all of its assets, including on-air, online, mobile and streaming. The organization provides research, sales resources and advocacy for its members.

== Initiatives ==
In 2004, TVB and the Ad Council partnered with NHTSA to launch the Project Roadblock anti-drunk driving campaign; 2022 will be the 19th year of this long-running local broadcast TV initiative. Each year between December 26th and 31st over 1,000 TV stations donate airtime to run the anti-buzzed driving commercials.

In 2008 TVB launched its ePort system for handling electronic transactions, which by September 2009 had processed 30,000 orders involving around 110 advertising agencies that create advertising and 930 TV stations. Eport delivered over $50 billion in new order to TV stations and rep firms as of 2022.

In 2010, it adopted TVB as its official name and refocused on the message that local stations also offer television commercial time and space on a range of digital channels.

In 2017, TVB announced the inaugural TVB NEXT Awards to honor the local broadcast TV industry's next generation of leaders in advertising sales, buying, planning and operations, underwritten by WideOrbit.

In 2019, TVB advocated for an industry-wide move to transact the selling and buying of local broadcast TV advertising inventory using impressions rather than conventional ratings points.

In 2020, TVB launched the TVB NEXT Women program, underwritten by WideOrbit. The program advocates for women in the local broadcast TV industry by providing skill-building, leadership and professional development content. In 2022, TVB announced 16 new supporting partners for the program, including broadcast TV ownership groups and other industry-related organizations.
