= Kenneth A. Cox =

American attorney

Commissioner of the Federal Communications Commission
- In office March 26, 1963 – August 31, 1970
- President: John F. Kennedy; Lyndon B. Johnson; Richard Nixon
- Preceded by: T.A.M. Craven
- Succeeded by: Robert Wells

Personal details
- Born: December 7, 1916; Topeka, Kansas
- Died: October 31, 2011 (aged 94); Bethesda, Maryland
- Political party: Democratic

Kenneth A. Cox (December 7, 1916 – October 31, 2011) was an American attorney who served as a Commissioner of the Federal Communications Commission from 1963 to 1970. For his work in government, he won a Alfred I. duPont–Columbia University Award in 1971.

He died on October 31, 2011, in Bethesda, Maryland at age 94.
