= Big Four (American television) =

Informal name for major US TV broadcast networks

The "Big Four" major American broadcast television networks: NBC, CBS, ABC, and Fox, arranged by the year each network began regular television broadcasting in the United States.

From the 1950s to the 1980s, during the network era of American television, there were three commercial broadcast television networks – NBC (the National Broadcasting Company, "the Peacock Network"), CBS (the Columbia Broadcasting System, "the Eye Network"), ABC (the American Broadcasting Company, "the Alphabet Network") – that due to their longevity and ratings success are informally referred to as the "Big Three". The three networks' dominance was interrupted with the launch of Fox (the Fox Broadcasting Company, "the Searchlight Network") in 1986, leading it to join them as one of the expanded "Big Four", while the viewership shares of all the major broadcast networks declined over the following years.

== Backgrounds ==
The National Broadcasting Company and Columbia Broadcasting System were both founded as radio networks in the 1920s, with NBC eventually encompassing two national radio networks, the prestige Red Network and the lower-profile Blue Network. They gradually began experimental television stations in the 1930s, with commercial broadcasts being allowed by the Federal Communications Commission on July 1, 1941. In 1943, the U.S. government determined that NBC's two-network setup was anticompetitive and forced it to spin off one of the networks; NBC chose to sell the Blue Network operations, which eventually became the American Broadcasting Company.

All three networks began regular, commercial television broadcasts in the 1940s. NBC and CBS began commercial operations in 1941, followed by ABC in 1948. A smaller fourth network, the DuMont Television Network, launched in 1944. The three networks originally controlled only a few local television stations, but they quickly affiliated with other stations to cover almost the entire U.S. by the late 1950s. Several of these stations affiliated with all three major networks and DuMont, or some combination of the four, in markets where only one or two television stations operated in the early years of commercial television; this resulted in several network shows, often those with lower national viewership, receiving scattershot market clearances, since in addition to maintaining limited broadcast schedules early on, affiliates that shoehorned programming from many networks had to also make room for locally produced content. As other stations signed on in larger cities, ABC, NBC, and CBS were eventually able to carry at least a sizable portion of their programming on one station.

Of the four original networks, only DuMont did not have a corresponding radio network. Ironically, the fourth radio network of the Golden Age of Radio era, the Mutual Broadcasting System, which maintained a long time extensive news reporting unit up to the 1980s, had briefly considered the idea of transitioning with expansion and launching a television network, with consideration being made to have film studio Metro-Goldwyn-Mayer supply programming talent. Plans for the proposed Mutual-branded network advanced far enough that, at the annual meeting of Mutual stockholders in April 1950, network president Frank White made an official announcement of the planned creation of a limited five-station Mutual network (Boston-WNAC, New York City-WOR, Washington, D.C.-WOIC, Chicago-WGN, and Los Angeles-KHJ). At that same time Mutual radio station KQV in Pittsburgh, which was engaged in an ultimately unsuccessful attempt to get a television license, was reportedly hoping for their station to be a Mutual television affiliate. "Mutual Television Network" ended up being the decided-on branding for the Mutual-branded network. However, the 5-station Mutual network failed in short time, and Mutual became the only minor radio network outside the "Big Three" American radio networks, even with a short-lived TV network, to not be long-term connected to (and eventually lose its dominance to) a television network. Afterwards, Mutual's individual component stations themselves launched television outlets in their home cities. Some of Mutual's component stations bought a stake in the Overmyer Network in 1967 (resulting in a branding change to "The United Network"), but other than a single late-night talk show, The Las Vegas Show, which lasted one month, that network never made it to its full launch.

== Network competition ==
=== Early era ===
For most of the history of television in the United States, the Big Three dominated, controlling the vast majority of television broadcasting. DuMont ceased regular programming in 1955; the NTA Film Network, unusual in that its programming, all pre-recorded, was distributed by mail instead of through communications wires, signed on in 1956 and lasted until 1961. From 1961, and lasting until the early 1990s, there were only three major networks. Every hit series appearing in the Nielsen top 20 television programs and every successful commercial network telecast of a major feature film was aired by one of the Big Three networks.

=== Fox ===
A viable fourth television network in the commercial sense would not again become competitive with the Big Three until Fox was founded in October 1986 from some of the assets and remnants of the DuMont network, which had become Metromedia after DuMont folded, and were acquired by News Corporation earlier in 1986. Fox, which began as a distant fourth network, rose to major network status in 1994 after must-carry rules took effect; the rules allowed Fox affiliates to force their way onto cable lineups, and the network's affiliation deal with New World Communications, which it later purchased in 1996, and the acquisition of National Football League broadcast rights brought a wave of new Fox affiliates.

Since its founding, Fox has surpassed ABC and NBC in the ratings during the early primetime hours in which it competes against the longer-established networks, becoming the second most-watched network behind CBS during the 2000s. During the 2007–08 season, Fox was the highest-rated of the major broadcast networks, as well as the first non-Big Three network to reach first place, but it lost the spot in the 2008–09 season and dropped to a close second. From 2004 to 2012 and 2020 to 2021, Fox also dominated American television in the lucrative and viewer-rich 18–49 age demographics, in large part due to the success of its NFL coverage and its top-rated prime time program, American Idol. Given the network's success in its prime time and sports offerings, it has been occasionally included with the Big Three, in which case the phrase "Big Four" is used.

Although Fox has firmly established itself as the nation's fourth major network with its ratings success, it is not considered part of the Big Three. Among Fox's differences with the Big Three is its reduced weekday programming. It lacks national morning and evening news programs; Fox has a news division consisting of cable and radio operations, but does not provide content for the broadcast television network other than a weekly news analysis program, limited special breaking news reports and an affiliate news service for its stations called Fox News Edge. Fox does not feature any daytime programming on weekdays, a third hour of prime time, or late-night talk shows.

=== 1990s–present ===
Other networks eventually launched in an attempt to compete with the Big Three as well as Fox, although these "netlets" have been unable to ascend to the same level of success. The WB and UPN launched in 1995; like Fox, they both added nights of prime time programming over the course of a few years, although The WB was the only one that aired any on weekends, carrying a Sunday night lineup for all but its first half-season on the air. In 1998, The WB launched The WB 100+ Station Group, a programming service primarily intended for smaller markets.

Both networks mainly aired only prime time and children's programming. The latter was the only form of weekday daytime programming offered by either one, although UPN discontinued its children's lineup in 2003 at the conclusion of a content deal with Disney, and UPN aired sports programming via the short-lived XFL, as well as WWF SmackDown!.

While The WB and UPN each had a few popular series during their existences, they struggled for overall viewership and financial losses. This led their respective parent companies, Time Warner and CBS Corporation, to shut them down and jointly launch The CW and The CW Plus in 2006. The CW initially featured a mix of programs from both predecessors, as well as some newer shows after the launch. The last surviving series of The CW's predecessors — Supernatural, from The WB — continued until its finale on The CW in 2020. Nexstar Media Group acquired a 75-percent ownership stake in The CW on October 3, 2022; former joint owners Paramount Skydance (successor to CBS Corporation) and Warner Bros. Discovery (successor to Time Warner) retained a 25-percent stake, split at nominal 12.5-percent stakes for both companies. Under Nexstar, The CW also began to broaden its programming to include national news (primarily via collaborations with Nexstar-owned cable news channel NewsNation) and sports programming,

Fox launched MyNetworkTV at the same time as The CW, with a lineup of English language telenovelas; it later shifted toward unscripted programs and movies, though its persistent lack of ratings success led News Corporation in 2009 to convert it to a syndication service, which primarily carries acquired programming.

Pax, a venture of Paxson Communications, debuted on August 31, 1998, as a seventh national broadcast network, but was positioned as a "family-friendly" alternative to the "big four"; although it carried a limited schedule of first-run programs in its early years, its schedule otherwise was composed mainly of syndicated reruns. Pax later rebranded to i: Independent Television in 2005, before it was renamed to Ion Television in 2007, and then shortened to simply Ion afterwards.

=== PBS ===
Logo of PBS

The Public Broadcasting Service (PBS), which has existed since 1970, is not considered to be a "Big" network. PBS operates as a noncommercial service with a very different distribution form compared to the major networks; its member stations basically own the network instead of the traditional mode of a network owning some of its stations and affiliating with additional stations owned by other broadcasters, and it maintains memberships with more than one educational station in a few markets.

=== Market share ===
In the 21st century, the "Big Four" have controlled only a relatively small portion of the broadcasting market in the United States. By 2007, their collective share was estimated at a combined 32%. The Big Four's market share has declined considerably as a result of growing competition from other broadcast networks such as Ion Television, The CW, and MyNetworkTV; Spanish language networks such as Univision, UniMás, and Telemundo; national cable and satellite channels such as TNT, TBS, ESPN, CNN, and AMC; and streaming channels such as Netflix and Prime Video.

Furthermore, media conglomerates have taken over most of the broadcast networks, providing corporate synergy with their other sibling media assets. Since 1996, ABC has been owned by The Walt Disney Company, whose assets now include Disney Experiences, Disney Channel, Walt Disney Pictures, 20th Century Studios, ESPN, Disney+ and Hulu. Since 2004, NBC has been owned by NBCUniversal, whose assets include Universal Pictures, Peacock, Universal Destinations & Experiences, and Bravo. Since 2025, CBS has been owned by Skydance, whose assets now include Warner Bros. Pictures, Paramount Pictures, HBO, CNN, MTV, Showtime, Nickelodeon, HBO Max and Paramount+. Since 2019, Fox and MyNetworkTV have been owned by Fox Corporation, who assets include Fox News, Tubi, Fox Sports, and others, with an acquisition of Roku pending. The CW and The CW Plus have been owned by Nexstar since 2022, with a minority stake still held by Skydance.

== See also ==
- Lists of ABC television affiliates
- Lists of NBC television affiliates
- Lists of CBS television affiliates
- Lists of Fox television affiliates
- Cable television in the United States
- Communications in the United States
- Lists of television stations in the United States
- List of United States pay television channels
- List of United States over-the-air television networks
- List of television stations in North America by media market
- Satellite television in the United States
- Television in the United States
- Television news in the United States
- Cable news in the United States
