= Thomas Joseph Sugrue =

American writer (1907–1953)

Thomas Joseph Sugrue (1907–1953) was an American writer. He is best known today as the writer of There Is a River, the only biography of Edgar Cayce written during Cayce's lifetime and the book that made the psychic a household name in 1942. He also lent his writing talents to the Edgar Cayce Association for Research and Enlightenment for numerous articles and news items.

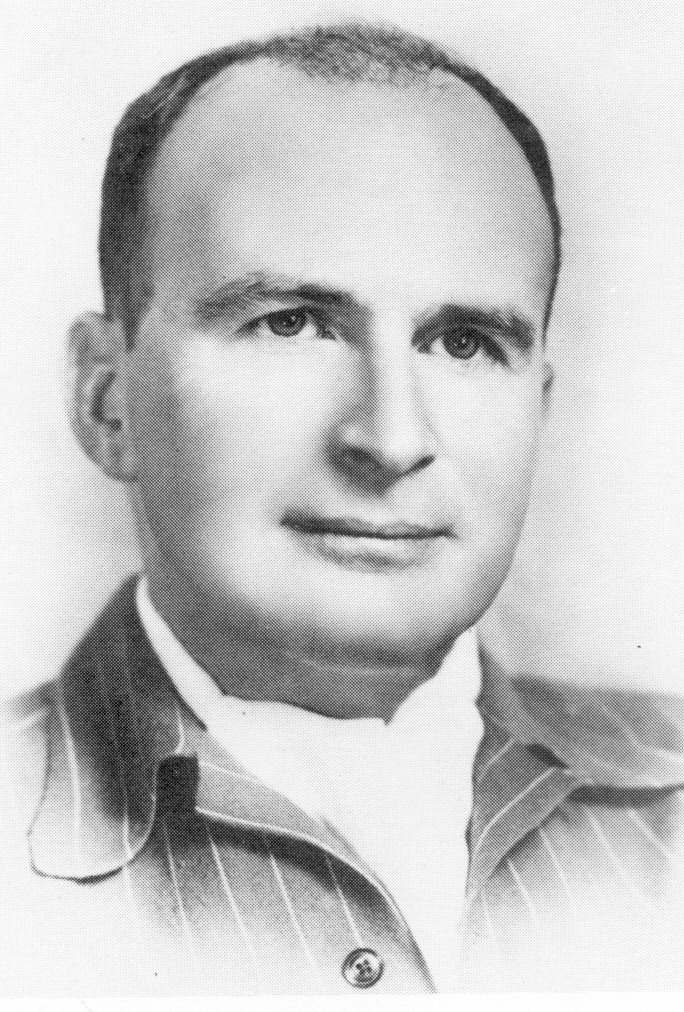
Thomas Sugrue circa 1942

== Life ==
Thomas Sugrue was born in a house on Ward Street in Naugatuck, Connecticut, in 1907 to Michael and Mary Sugrue. He grew up in a staunch Irish Catholic background. His father worked as a mail carrier. His early memories of life in the borough's Irish section were captured in a 1940 autobiographical novel, Such Is the Kingdom, which was recast as the fictional "Kelly Hill".

After graduating in 1924 from Naugatuck High School where dancing was "his favorite pastime" according to a yearbook, Sugrue worked briefly as a teller for the Naugatuck Savings Bank, before attending Washington and Lee University in Virginia, where he graduated with bachelor's and master's degrees in English.

It was there he was introduced to classmate Hugh Lynn Cayce, the eldest son of Edgar and Gertrude Cayce. Edgar Cayce had the strange gift of going into a trance-like state and providing answers to questions. The subjects included diagnosis and treatment of illness, finding hidden items, universal laws, karma, and even past lives.

Sugrue made the five-hour trip from Lexington to Virginia Beach with Hugh Lynn, thinking that he would debunk a fraud. After meeting Edgar Cayce, he decided that there was no deception. His first reading was given in Virginia Beach on June 7, 1927, at the request of Hugh Lynn.

Sugrue worked as a reporter at the former Naugatuck Daily News, before being hired by the New York Herald Tribune newspaper. In 1934, he joined the staff of The American Magazine and wrote articles covering Athens, Egypt, Palestine, England, and more as he traveled the world. Copies of every issue of The American Magazine between 1934 and 1938 are available for view at the reference desk of the Whittemore Memorial Library in Naugatuck, Connecticut.

At this point, he was taken ill from a rare arthritis disease. Innovatively treated in a clinic for weeks, he left it as a dying person with a few weeks to live. After seeking relief for his condition in Florida, Sugrue moved to Virginia Beach in June 1939 and lived at the Cayces' home until October 1941. With Hugh Lynn Cayce as his nurse, he received readings from Edgar Cayce and treatments for his condition.

On file at Edgar Cayce's A.R.E. headquarters in Virginia Beach are a total of 76 documented psychic readings given specifically for Sugrue by Cayce and a collection of Sugrue's writings. It was during this time that he wrote There Is a River, the biography of Edgar Cayce.

During his lifetime, he wrote seven books, including Starling of the White House, with and for Edmund Starling, the man who protected all U.S. presidents from Woodrow Wilson to Franklin Delano Roosevelt, hosted a New York City radio show Conversations at Eight, and explored the nation of Israel.

"We called it music" - A generation of Jazz, written with and about jazz musician Eddie Condon, is an account of the birth of that musical genre, stretching from lively descriptions of Eddie Condon's life to deep philosophical interpretations.

Watch for the Morning is a report on the events which led to the creation of the State of Israel. With the many questions on esoteric themes he would ask to Arab, Jew and Druze circles he would meet in this process, Watch for the Morning phrases an answer that still has to be put in shared sentences nowadays.

With his 1952 A Catholic Speaks His Mind, his shortest and last book, he puts Christianity in the perspective of religion seen as a universal, structural part of the human civilization.

Sugrue died in 1953 in New York, at the age of 45, during a hip replacement meant to help him walk again.

A letter dated July 15, 1954, from Hugh Lynn Cayce to members of A.R.E. announced the establishment of the Thomas Sugrue Memorial Library at Wainwright House, in Rye, New York. It contains a collection of Sugrue's work.

== There is a River ==
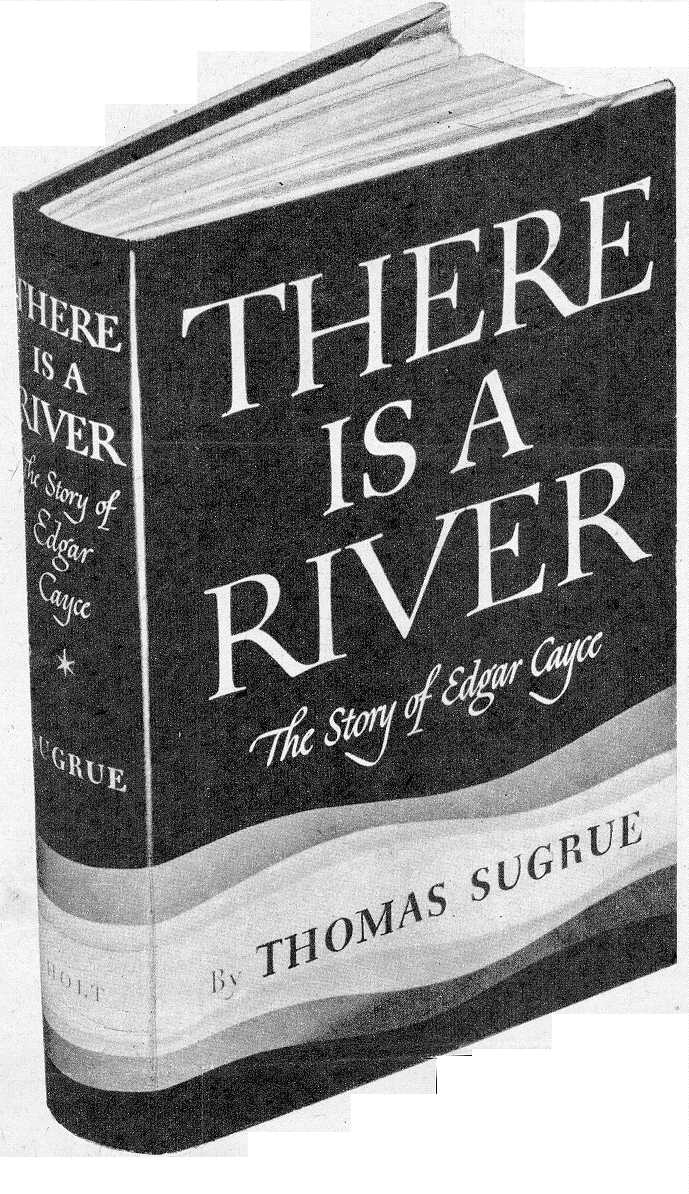
There Is a River, originally published in 1942

Sugrue's book tells the story of Cayce's life. It relates that Edgar Cayce was born on March 18, 1877, near Beverly, south of Hopkinsville, Kentucky. As a child he played with the 'little folk' and was alleged to have seen his deceased grandfather. He regarded them all as incorporeal because he could see through them if he looked hard enough. Cayce found it very difficult to keep his mind on his lessons at school.

He was taken to church when he was 10, and from then he read the Bible, becoming engrossed, and completing a dozen readings by the time he was 12. In May 1889, while reading the Bible in his hut in the woods, he 'saw' a woman with wings who told him that his prayers were answered, and asked him what he wanted most of all. He was frightened, but he said that most of all he wanted to help others, especially sick children. He decided he would like to be a missionary.

The next night, after a complaint from the school teacher, his father ruthlessly tested him for spelling, eventually knocking him out of his chair with exasperation. At that point, Cayce 'heard' the voice of the lady who had appeared the day before. She told him that if he could sleep a little 'they' could help him. He begged for a rest and put his head on the spelling book. When his father came back into the room and woke him up, he knew all the answers. In fact, he could repeat anything in the book. His father thought he had been fooling before and knocked him out of the chair again. Eventually, Cayce used all his school books that way.

By 1892, the teacher regarded Cayce as his best student. On being questioned, Cayce told the teacher that he saw pictures of the pages in the books. His father became proud of this accomplishment and spread it around, resulting in Cayce becoming "different" from his peers.

Shortly after this, Cayce exhibited an ability to diagnose in his sleep. He was struck on the base of the spine by a ball in a school game, after which he began to act very strangely, and eventually was put to bed. He went to sleep and diagnosed the cure, which his family prepared and which cured him as he slept. His father boasted that his son was, "the greatest fellow in the world when he's asleep." However, this ability was not demonstrated again for several years.

Cayce's uncommon personality is also shown in an unusual incident in which he rode a certain mule back to the farmhouse at the end of a work day. This stunned everyone there, as the mule could not be ridden. The owner, thinking it may be time to break the animal in again, attempted to mount it but was immediately thrown off. Cayce left for his family in the city that evening.

=== 1877 to 1912: Kentucky period ===
In December 1893, the Cayce family moved to Hopkinsville, Kentucky, and occupied 705 West Seventh on the southeast corner of Seventh and Young Streets. A ninth-grade education was often considered more than sufficient for working-class children. Much of the remainder of Cayce's younger years would be characterized by a search for both employment and money.

Throughout his life, Cayce was drawn to church as a member of the Disciples of Christ. He read the Bible once a year every year, taught at Sunday school, and recruited missionaries. He said he could see auras around people, spoke to angels, and heard voices of departed relatives. In his early years, he agonized over whether these psychic abilities were spiritually delivered from the highest source.

In 1900, Cayce formed a business partnership with his father to sell Woodmen of the World Insurance; however, in March he was struck by severe laryngitis that resulted in a complete loss of speech. Unable to work, he lived at home with his parents for almost a year. He then decided to take up the trade of photography, an occupation that would exert less strain on his voice. He began an apprenticeship at the photography studio of W. R. Bowles in Hopkinsville, and eventually became quite talented in his trade.

In 1901, a traveling stage hypnotist and entertainer named Hart, who referred to himself as "The Laugh Man", was performing at the Hopkinsville Opera House. Hart heard about Cayce's condition and offered to attempt a cure. Cayce accepted his offer, and the experiment was conducted in the office of Manning Brown, the local throat specialist. Cayce's voice allegedly returned while in a hypnotic trance but disappeared on awakening. Hart tried a posthypnotic suggestion that the voice would continue to function after the trance, but this proved unsuccessful.

Since Hart had appointments at other cities, he could not continue his hypnotic treatments of Cayce, but admitted he had failed because Cayce would not go into the third stage of hypnosis to take a suggestion. A New York hypnotist, Dr Quackenboss, found the same impediment but, after returning to New York, suggested that Cayce should be prompted to take over his own case while in the second stage of hypnosis. The only local hypnotist, Al Layne, offered to help Cayce restore his voice. Layne suggested that Cayce describe the nature of his condition and cure while in a hypnotic trance. Cayce described his own ailment from a first-person plural point of view: "we" instead of the singular "I". In subsequent sessions, when Cayce wanted to indicate that the connection was made to the "entity" of the person that was requesting the reading, he would generally start off with, "We have the body." According to the reading for the "entity" of Cayce, his voice loss was due to psychological paralysis, and could be corrected by increasing the blood flow to the voice box. Layne suggested that the blood flow be increased and Cayce's face supposedly became flushed with blood, and both his chest and throat turned bright red. After 20 minutes, Cayce, still in a trance, declared the treatment over. On awakening, his voice was alleged to have remained normal. Apparently, relapses occurred, but were said to have been corrected by Layne in the same way, and eventually the cure was said to be permanent.

Layne had read of similar hypnotic cures by the Marquis de Puységur, a follower of Franz Mesmer, and was keen to explore the limits of the healing knowledge involved with the trance voice. He asked Cayce to describe Layne's own ailments and suggest cures, and reportedly found the results both accurate and effective. Layne regarded the ability as clairvoyance. Layne suggested that Cayce offer his trance healing to the public. Cayce was reluctant as he had no idea what he was prescribing while asleep, and whether the remedies were safe. He also told Layne he himself did not want to know anything about the patient as it was not relevant. He finally agreed, on the condition that readings would be free. He began, with Layne's help, to offer free treatments to the townspeople. Layne described Cayce's method as, "...a self-imposed hypnotic trance which induces clairvoyance." Reports of Cayce's work appeared in the newspapers, which inspired many postal inquiries. Cayce stated he could work just as effectively using a letter from the individual as with the person being present in the room. Given only the person's name and location, Cayce said he could diagnose the physical and mental conditions of what he termed "the entity," and then provide a remedy. Cayce was still reticent and worried, as "one dead patient was all he needed to become a murderer". His fiancée, Gertrude Evans, agreed with him. Few people knew what he was up to. There was a common belief at the time that subjects of hypnosis eventually went insane, or at least that their health suffered. Cayce soon became famous, and people from around the world sought his advice through correspondence.

In May 1902 he got a bookshop job in the town of Bowling Green where he boarded with some young professionals, two of whom were doctors. He lost his voice while there and Layne came to help effect the normal cure, finally visiting every week. Cayce, still worried, kept the meetings secret, and continued to refuse money for his readings. He invented a card game called Pit or Board of Trade, simulating wheat market trading, that became popular, but when he sent the idea to a game company they copyrighted it and he got no returns. He still refused to give readings for money.

He and Gertrude Evans married on June 17, 1903, and Gertrude came to Bowling Green. She still disapproved of the readings, and Cayce still agonized over the morality of them. A few days later Layne revealed the activity to the professionals at the boarding house, one of whom was a magistrate and journalist, after which state medical authorities forced Layne to close his practice. He left to acquire osteopathic qualifications in Franklin. Cayce and Gertrude accepted the resulting publicity as best they could, greatly aided by the diplomacy of the young doctors.

Cayce and a relative opened a photographic studio in Bowling Green, while the doctors formed a committee with some colleagues to investigate the phenomenon, with Cayce's co-operation. All the experiments confirmed the accuracy of the readings. However, Cayce refused a lucrative offer to go into business. After a violent examination by doctors while in a trance, Cayce refused any more investigations, declaring that he would only do readings for those who needed help and believed in the readings.

In 1906 and 1907 fires burned down his two photographic studios, leading to bankruptcy. Between the two fires, his first son was born March 16, 1907. He became debt free by 1909, although completely broke, and ready to start again. In 1907, outstanding diagnostic successes in the family helped his confidence. He again refused an offer to go into business, this time with homeopath Wesley H. Ketchum from Hopkinsville, who was introduced by his father. He found a job at the H. P. Tresslar photography firm.

However, Ketchum was persistent, spread information in various medical circles, and in October 1910 got written up in the press. When a reporter contacted Cayce, he explained to the reporter that he somehow had the ability to easily go into the intuitive sleep when he wanted to, and this was different from how he went to sleep normally like everyone else. When asked the mechanism of the readings via the sleep method, they were told that it happened via the capabilities of the subconscious mind.

Ketchum again urged Cayce to join a business company. After soul searching the whole night, Cayce finally accepted the offer under certain conditions, including that he did not take money for the readings. Instead the company was to furnish him with a photographic studio for his livelihood, and build a separate office for the readings. The contract was modified to give 50% of the earnings to Cayce and his father. Cayce read the back readings, but they contained so many technical terms that he gained no more understanding of what he was doing. He preferred to put the readings on a more scientific basis, but only the doctors in Hopkinsville would cooperate, whereas most of the patients were not in that locality. Also, doctors from all specialties were needed as the treatments prescribed varied widely.

Edgar Cayce, and especially Gertrude, still did not give therapeutic priority to the readings and supposedly lost their second child due to this reticence. When Gertrude became fatally ill with tuberculosis, they used the readings after the doctor had given up. Miraculously, the treatment cured her. Shortly after this, in 1912, Cayce, whose everyday conscious mind was not aware during the readings, discovered that Ketchum had not been honest about them, and had also used them to gamble for finance. He argued in defense that the medical profession were not backing them. Cayce quit the company immediately and went back to the Tresslar photography firm in Selma, Alabama.

=== 1912 to 1925: Selma, Alabama period ===
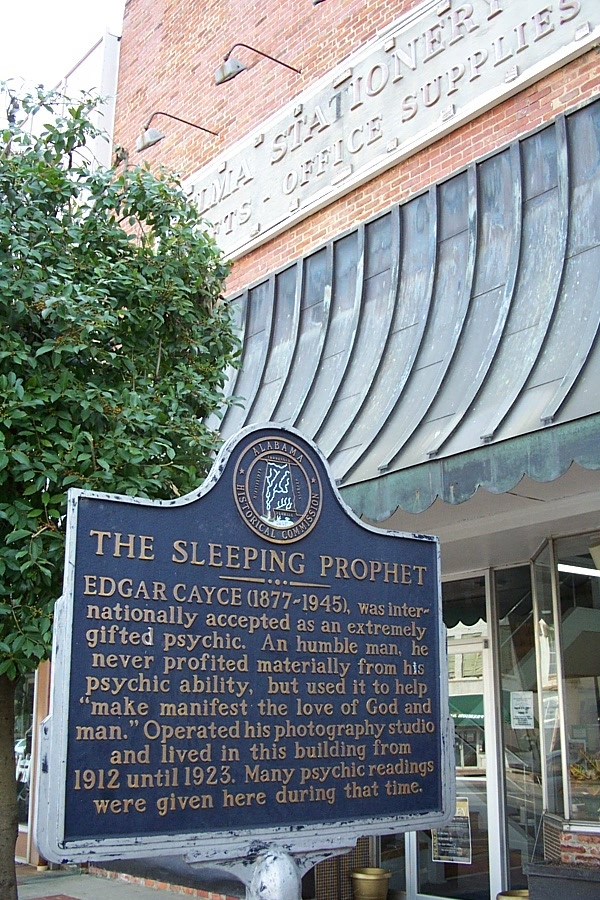
Historic marker in downtown Selma, Alabama, in front of the building where Cayce lived and worked from 1912 to 1923.

Cayce's work grew in volume as his fame grew. He asked for voluntary donations to support himself and his family so that he could practice full-time. To help raise money he invented Pit, a card game based on the commodities trading at the Chicago Board of Trade, and the game is still sold today. He continued to work in an apparent trance state with a hypnotist all his life. His wife and eldest son later replaced Layne in this role. A secretary, Gladys Davis, recorded his readings in shorthand.

The growing fame of Cayce along with the popularity he received from newspapers attracted several eager commercially minded men who wanted to seek a fortune by using his clairvoyant abilities. Even though Cayce was reluctant to help them, he was persuaded to give his readings, which left him dissatisfied with himself and unsuccessful. A cotton merchant offered him a hundred dollars a day for his readings about the daily outcomes in the cotton market; however, despite his poor finances, Cayce refused the merchant's offer. Some wanted to know where to hunt for treasures while others wanted to know the outcome of horse races. Several times he was persuaded to give such readings as an experiment. However, when he used his ability for such purposes, he did no better than chance alone would dictate. These experiments allegedly left him depleted of energy, distraught, and unsatisfied with himself. Finally, he decided to use his gift only to help the distressed and sick.

In 1923, Arthur Lammers, a wealthy printer and student of metaphysics, persuaded Cayce to give readings on philosophical subjects. Cayce was told by Lammers that, while in his trance state, he spoke of Lammers' past lives and of reincarnation, something Lammers believed in. Reincarnation was a popular subject of the day but not an accepted part of Christian doctrine. Because of this, Cayce questioned his stenographer about what he said in his trance state and remained unconvinced. He challenged Lammers' charge that he had validated astrology and reincarnation in the following dialogue:

Cayce: I said all that?... I couldn't have said all that in one reading.
Lammers: No. But you confirmed it. You see, I have been studying metaphysics for years, and I was able by a few questions, by the facts you gave, to check what is right and what is wrong with a whole lot of the stuff I've been reading. The important thing is that the basic system which runs through all the mystery religions, whether they come from Tibet or the pyramids of Egypt, is backed up by you. It's actually the right system.

Cayce's stenographer recorded the following:

In this we see the plan of development of those individuals set upon this plane, meaning the ability to enter again into the presence of the Creator and become a full part of that creation.
Insofar as this entity is concerned, this is the third appearance on this plane, and before this one, as the monk. We see glimpses in the life of the entity now as were shown in the monk, in this mode of living. The body is only the vehicle ever of that spirit and soul that waft through all times and ever remain the same.

Cayce was quite unconvinced that he had been referring to the doctrine of reincarnation, and the best Lammers could offer was that the reading "opens up the door" and to go on to share his beliefs and knowledge with Cayce. Lammers had come to him with quite a bit of information of his own to share with Cayce and seemed intent upon convincing Cayce now that he felt the reading had confirmed his strongly-held beliefs. It should be noted, however, that 12 years earlier Cayce had briefly alluded to reincarnation. In reading 4841–1, given April 22, 1911, Cayce referred to the soul being "transmigrated." Because Cayce's readings were not systematically recorded until 1923, it is possible that he may have mentioned reincarnation in other earlier readings.

Lammers asked Cayce to come to Dayton to pursue metaphysical truth via the readings. Cayce eventually agreed and went to Dayton. Gertrude Cayce was dubious but interested. There, Cayce produced much metaphysical information, which Cayce tried to reconcile with Christianity. Lammers declared that the fifth chapter of Matthew was the constitution of Christianity and the Sermon on the Mount was its Declaration of Independence. It appeared that Cayce's subconscious mind was as much at home with the language of metaphysics as it was with the language of anatomy and medicine.

Cayce reported that his conscience bothered him severely over this conflict. His readings of reincarnations were going against his biblical teachings and at one point he wanted to cease his channeling sessions. Once again Cayce lost his voice and in a reading for himself he was informed if he was no longer going to be a channel, his mission in this life was complete. Ultimately his trance voice, the "we" of the readings, dialogued with Cayce and finally persuaded him to continue with these kinds of readings.

Lammers wanted to ask the readings the purpose of Cayce's clairvoyance, and to put up money for an organisation supporting Cayce's healing methods. Cayce decided to accept the work and asked his family to join him in Dayton as soon as they could. But by the time the Cayces had arrived there, near the end of 1923, Lammers found himself in financial difficulties and could be of no use. Cayce used his knowledge of the Bible to convince his family that it agreed with reincarnation and other metaphysical teachings.

It was at this time Cayce directed his activities to provide readings centred around health. The remedies that were channeled often involved the use of unusual electrotherapy, ultraviolet light, diet, massage, gemstones, less mental work and more relaxation in sand on the beach. His remedies were coming under the scrutiny of the American Medical Association and Cayce felt that it was time to legitimize the operations with the aid of licensed medical practitioners. In 1925 Cayce reported while in a trance, "the voice" had instructed him to move to Virginia Beach, Virginia across the street from the beach. He was informed that the sand's crystals would have curative properties to promote rapid healing.

=== 1925 to 1945: Virginia Beach period ===
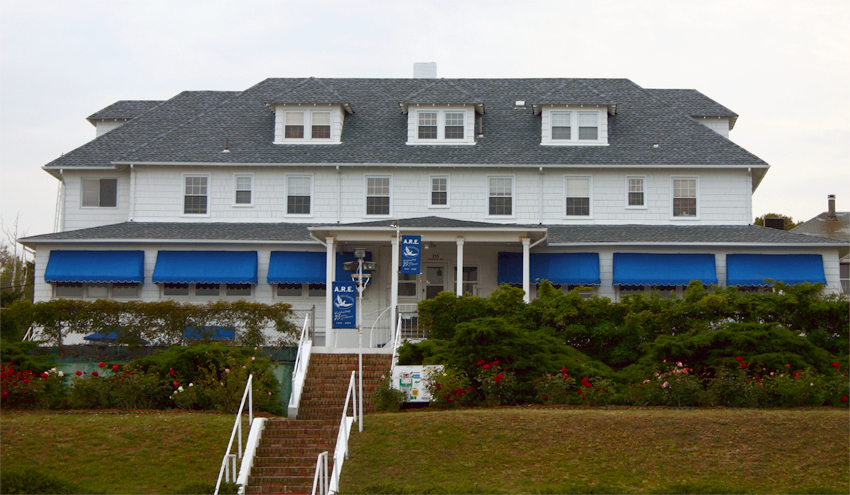
The Cayce Hospital 2006

Cayce's mature period, in which he created the several institutions that survived him, can be considered to have started in 1925. By this time he was a professional psychic with a small number of employees and volunteers. The readings increasingly came to involve occult or esoteric themes.

Money was extremely scarce, but help came from interested persons. The idea of an association and a hospital was mooted again, but the readings insisted on Virginia Beach, not suiting most of the people. Gertrude Cayce began to conduct all the readings. Morton Blumenthal, a young man who worked in the stock exchange in New York with his trader brother, became very interested in the readings, shared Cayce's outlook, and offered to finance the vision in the right spirit. He bought them a house at Virginia Beach.

On May 6, 1927, the Association of National Investigations was incorporated in the state of Virginia. This would manage building the hospital and a scientific study of the readings. Morton was president and his brother and several others were vice presidents. Cayce was secretary and treasurer, and Gladys was assistant secretary. To protect against legal prosecution, the rules required any person requesting a reading to become a member of the Association and agree they were participating in an experiment in psychic research. Early in 1928, Dr Moseley Brown, head of the psychology dept at Washington and Lee University, became convinced of the readings and joined the Association.

On October 11, 1928, the dedication ceremonies for the hospital complex were held. It contained a lecture hall, library, vault for storage of the readings, and offices for research workers. There was also a large living room, a 12-car garage, servants quarters, and a tennis court. It contained "the largest lawn, in fact the only lawn, between the Cavalier and Cape Henry." The first patient was admitted the next day.

This facility would enable consistent checking and rechecking of the remedies, which was Cayce's goal. There were consistent remedies for many of the illnesses regardless of the patient, and Cayce hoped to produce a compendium that could be used by the medical profession. A distinguished chemist, Dr Sunker A. Bisley, DPhil (Oxon), who also used psychic knowledge to produce medicines, collaborated with Cayce to produce Atomidine, an absorbable form of iodine, which was perfected and sold.

The basic raison d'etre for all the cures was the "assimilation of needed properties through the digestive system, from food taken into the body… [All treatments, including all schools and types of treatment, were given in order to establish] the proper equilibrium of the assimilating system." Therapies as divergent as salt packs, poultices, hot compresses, color healing, magnetism, vibrator treatment, massage, osteopathic manipulation, dental therapy, colonics, enemas, antiseptics, inhalants, homeopathics, essential oils, mud baths were prescribed. Substances used included oils, salts, herbs, iodine, witch hazel, magnesia, bismuth, alcohol, castoria, lactated pepsin, turpentine, charcoal, animated ash, soda, cream of tartar, aconite, laudanum, camphor, and gold solution. These were prescribed to overcome conditions that prevented proper digestion and assimilation of needed nutrients from the prescribed diet. The aim of the readings was to produce a healthy body, removing the cause of the specific ailment. Readings would indicate if the patient's recovery was problematic.

There was a waiting list of months ahead. Blumenthal and Brown went ahead with ambitious plans for a university as a supplement to the hospital and a "parallel service for the mind and spirit". In fact, it was to dwarf the hospital and rival other universities in respectability before psychic studies would begin. It was to open on September 22, 1930. On September 16 Blumenthal called a meeting of the Association resulting in his ownership of the hospital to curb expenses. After the first semester he ceased his support of the university, and on February 26, 1931, closed down the Association. Cayce removed the files of the readings from the hospital and took them home.

The Depression years saw Cayce turn his attention to spiritual teachings. In 1931, Edgar Cayce's friends and family asked him how they could become psychic like him. Out of this seemingly simple question came an eleven-year discourse that led to the creation of "Study Groups". From his altered state, Cayce relayed to this group that the purpose of life is not to become psychic, but to become a more spiritually aware and loving person. Study Group #1 was told that they could "bring light to a waiting world" and that these lessons would still be studied a hundred years into the future. The readings were now about dreams, coincidence (synchronicity), developing intuition, karma, the akashic records, astrology, past-life relationships, soul mates and other esoteric subjects. Hundreds of books have been published about these readings.

June 6, 1931, 61 people attended a meeting to carry on the work and form a new organization called the Association for Research and Enlightenment. In July the new association was incorporated, and Cayce legally returned the house to Blumenthal and bought another place.

Hugh Lynn proposed that they develop a stock in trade rather than something grandiose, and that they build a library of research into the phenomena and hold study groups, and that Cayce would do two readings a day. The association accepted this, and Hugh Lynn also started a monthly bulletin for association members. The bulletin contained readings on general interest subjects, interesting cases, book reviews on psychic subjects, health hints from readings, and news of psychic phenomena in other fields.

Hugh Lynn narrowed the mailing list to some 300 members who were genuinely enthusiastic, and as a result the first annual congress of the assoc was held in June 1932. He procured speakers on various metaphysical and psychic subjects and included public readings by Cayce. Members left the conference eager to start study groups in their own localities. Records were kept of everything that went on in the readings including the attitudes and routines of Cayce. Everything was then checked with the subjects of the readings, most of whom were not present during the reading, and the data was published in a study entitled "100 cases of clairvoyance." However, the response from scientists in general was that none of the experiments were performed under test conditions. Hugh Lynn continued to build files of case histories, parallel studies in psychic phenomena, and research readings for the study groups.

Association activities remained simple and un-publicized. Members raised a building fund for an office, library, and vault, which they erected in 1940–1 as a single unit added on to the Cayce residence. No sign guided visitors to the centre. Association membership averaged 500 to 600. The turnover from year to year was approximately half this total. The other half remained a solid basis for the research work, an audience for case studies, pamphlets, bulletins—and the Congress bulletin, which was a yearbook and record of congress events. A mailing list of several thousand served people who remained interested in Cayce's activities.

Members were drawn from all of the Protestant churches: from the Roman, Greek, Syrian and Armenian Catholic churches; from Theosophy, Christian Science and Spiritualism; and from many Oriental religions. Cayce's philosophy was, if it makes you a better member of your church then it's good; if it takes you away from your church, it's bad. The philosophy of the readings was that truth is one, each organization is part of this one, therefore the A.R.E. was not to function as a schism or in opposition to any religious organization. The goal of the work was not something new but something ancient and universal.

Both sons entered the forces during the war. They both married, Hugh Lynn in 1941 and Edgar Evans in 1942.

In March 1943 the first edition of the only biography written during Cayce's lifetime, by Thomas Sugrue, was published. As a consequence, public demand increased. Office staff had to be increased, and the mailman could no longer carry all the mail so Gertrude got it from the post office by car. Hugh Lynn was away in the forces, and Cayce coped with the letters and increased his readings to four to six per day.

Cayce gained national prominence in 1943 after the publication of a high-profile article in the magazine Coronet titled "Miracle Man of Virginia Beach". World War II was taking its toll on American soldiers and he felt he could not refuse the families who requested help for their loved ones who were missing in action. He increased the frequency of his readings to eight per day to try to make an impression on the ever-growing pile of requests. He said this took a toll on his health as it was emotionally draining and often fatigued him. The readings themselves scolded him for attempting too much and that he should limit his workload to just two life readings a day or else these good efforts would eventually kill him.

From June 1943 to June 1944, 1,385 readings were taken. By August 1944 Cayce collapsed from strain. When he gave a reading on this situation, the instructions were to rest until he was well or dead. He and Gertrude went away to the mountains of Virginia, but in September Edgar Cayce suffered a stroke at the age of 67, in September 1944, and died on January 3, 1945. He is buried in Riverside Cemetery in Hopkinsville, Kentucky. Gertrude died 3 months later.

After the death of Cayce the Association continued the work of classifying and cross referring the over 14,000 files of readings that had been taken throughout Cayce's lifetime from March 31, 1901, to September 17, 1944. The results of these have been disseminated through the Associations publications with the members as the recipients of this material.
