= Lucille Kahn =

American actress

Lucille Kahn in 1925

Lucille Kahn (1902–1995) was a successful Broadway stage actress who became notable in the 1950s and 1960s for her advocacy and support for efforts to expand human consciousness.

In the 1920s, Kahn appeared in several productions opposite theatre legends Otis Skinner and Lionel Barrymore, most notably in the David Belasco production of Laugh, Clown, Laugh. In 1927 she married David E. Kahn, a close friend and early supporter of the famous psychic Edgar Cayce. Throughout the 1950s, she played an active role in bringing together proponents of Eastern philosophy, spiritual exploration, and metaphysical development, and her home on E 80th Street in New York became an informal salon for lectures and discussions that included Aldous Huxley, Gerald Heard, and Bill Wilson (cofounder of Alcoholics Anonymous).

In 1958, with the encouragement of Wilson and Heard, and with funding from the Eileen Garrett's Parapsychological Foundation, she helped to organize a group of intellectuals to explore clinical and spiritual potential of LSD-25. Between 1958 and 1960, the so-called "Basic Group" gathered on a regular basis to take LSD-25 in an intimate but controlled setting. The sessions were held in private homes just outside New York City. A small dose of the drug (75 to 100 micrograms), which was at that time still legally available for research purposes, would be administered to a single subject by an attending physician, Dr. Robert Laidlaw, then chief psychiatrist at Roosevelt Hospital. In addition to the subject and the physician, several other members of the group would be present, both to offer support, take observational notes and occasionally to ask probing questions of the subject during their experience. The subject's observations were compiled into written transcripts of the experience, and in most cases were accompanied by audio recordings. After the experience, subjects were asked to write a “subjective report” reflecting on their experiences. The transcripts and reports were distributed to the various members of the group. Participants in these experiments included religion editor for Harper & Brothers Eugene Exman, Buddhist scholar and Bollingen Fellow Dr. Garma Chen Chi Chang, and early civil-rights activist and educator Rachel Davis DuBois.

Her later life was devoted to promoting the work of Edgar Cayce, through the Association for Research and Enlightenment. She traveled extensively to holy sites, often as part of ARE tours, and once met with the Dalai Lama. She wrote the final chapter of David Kahn's posthumously published memoir, My Life with Edgar Cayce, as well as several articles for ARE publications.

Lucille Kahn was the grandmother of contemporary pageant artist, Alex Kahn.

== Sources ==
- Cheever, Susan. My Name Is Bill: Bill Wilson: His Life and the Creation of Alcoholics Anonymous (Simon and Schuster), pp. 175, 300.
- Huxley, Aldous. Letters of Aldous Huxley (Harper & Brothers, 1960), p. 918
- Kahn, David E. and Will Oursler. My Life with Edgar Cayce (Doubleday, 1970).
- Kirkpatrick, Sidney D. Edgar Cayce: An American Prophet (Riverhead Books, 2000) ISBN 1-57322-139-2
- Novak, Steven J. "LSD before Leary: Sidney Cohen's Critique of 1950s Psychedelic Drug Research" Isis, Vol. 88, No. 1. (Mar., 1997), pp. 87–110.
- Wing, Nell. Grateful To Have Been There: My 42 Years With Bill And Lois, And The Evolution Of Alcoholics Anonymous (Hazeldon PES, 1998), p. 125.
- Sugrue, Thomas. There is a River: the Story of Edgar Cayce. (Simon and Schuster)
- Reilly, Harold J, and Ruth Hagy Brod. The Edgar Cayce Handbook for Health Through Drugless Therapy (ARE Press, 2004) pp. 15,18,61–62,155
