= There Is a River =

There is a river is the beginning of most English translations of Psalm 46:4. There is a river may also refer to:

== Books ==
- There Is a River, an 1892 book by George Whitefield Chadwick
- There Is a River: Black River, a c. 1944 book about the Black River in South Carolina by W. R. Pritchett
- There Is a River: a novel, a 1959 book by Charlotte Miller
- There Is a River, a 1961 book by Richard Vaughan
- There Is a River: The story of Edgar Cayce, a 1969 book by Thomas Joseph Sugrue (originally published in as The story of Edgar Cayce: There Is a River)
- There Is a River: The Black Struggle for Freedom in America, a 1981 book by Vincent Harding

== Music ==
- "There Is a River", a 1969 song by Max and David Sapp
- There Is a River, a 1972 album and title song written and performed by Jimmy Swaggart
- "There Is a River", a 1999 choral arrangement by Marty Parks
- "There Is a River", a 2006 choral arrangement of Psalm 46:4–6, 10, by Ellen Gilson Voth
- "There Is a River", a song on Jars of Clay's 2006 album Good Monsters, release as a single in 2007
- "There Is a River", a song by Andy Park on his 2001 album Night and Day
- "Deep in Your Eyes (There Is a River)", a song by Jon Foreman on his 2008 EP Summer
