= Stanley Hart =

Stanley Hart may refer to:

- Stanley Hart (Megalopolis), a character in the film Megalopolis, played by D. B. Sweeney
- Stanley Robert Hart (born 1935), American geologist and geochemist
- Stanley Warde Hart (c. 1870–1944), American vaudeville performer and theater manager

== See also ==
- Stan Hart (1928–2017), American comedy writer
- Stan Hart (speedway rider) (1914–1937), English motorcycle speedway rider
