= Charles Albert Oberwager =

Judge in Manhattan

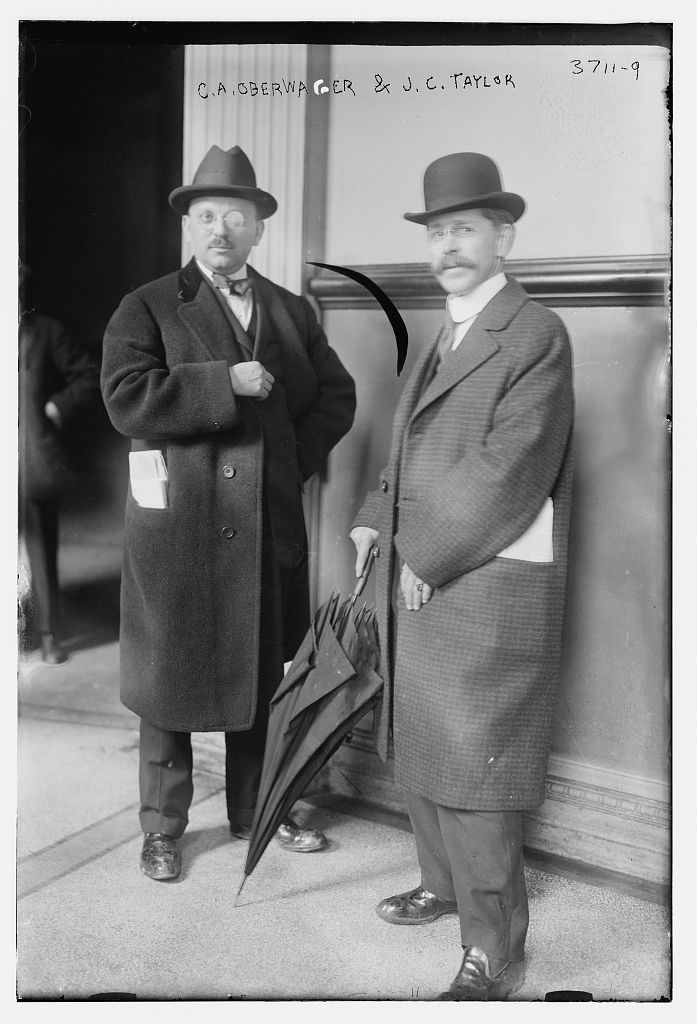
Charles A. Oberwager and J.C. Taylor in 1916

Charles Albert Oberwager (June 20, 1882 - July 17, 1945) was a lawyer and later a judge in Manhattan who presided over the case of the publication of Satyricon in 1922, ruling it was a classic book and not a pornographic book.

== Biography ==
He was born on June 20, 1882. He attended New York University and graduated with an LL.B. in 1908. He married Anna Mariash on June 30, 1912.

As a judge he presided over the case of the publication of Satyricon and its condemnation by John Saxton Sumner of the Society for the Suppression of Vice. His 1922 ruling declared it was a classic and not pornographic. In 1926 he ruled that "women shouldn't roll their stockings down in public" and ordered a woman be put in detention for three months.

In 1932 he was awarded an honorary Doctor of Law by Atlantic University.

He died in Southampton, New York, on July 17, 1945. His widow died in 1987.
