= Caroline Myss =

American author

- Born: December 2, 1952 (age 73); Chicago, Illinois
- Occupations: Teacher, author
- Writing career
- Period: 1987–present
- Genre: Spirituality
- Subjects: medical intuitive, spirituality, mysticism
- Notable work: Anatomy of the Spirit
- Website: www.myss.com

Caroline Myss (pronounced mace; born December 2, 1952) is an American author of 10 books and many audio recordings about mysticism and wellness. She is most well known for publishing Anatomy of the Spirit (1996). She also co-published The Creation of Health with Dr C Norman Shealy, MD, former Harvard professor of neurology. Myss describes herself as a medical intuitive and a mystic.

She was on The Oprah Winfrey Show several times including her 2002 appearance. In 2001 she hosted a TV series titled The Journey With Caroline Myss on the Oxygen (TV network), co-owned by Oprah Winfrey, exploring the spiritual and psychological roadblocks of life in an intimate workshop setting.

Her work has been criticized by some as being unsubstantiated and pseudoscientific. However, other sources suggest that energy medicine can have a place in an integrative approach to health, and while some are skeptical that "our biography becomes our biology", the concept may have a scientific basis.

== Biography ==
Caroline Myss was born on December 2, 1952, in Chicago and grew up with her parents and two brothers, one elder and one younger, in the Melrose Park, Illinois neighborhood near Chicago. She was raised a Catholic in a large Polish American family, and attended the Mother Guerin High School, River Grove, Illinois, run by the Sisters of Providence of Saint Mary-of-the-Woods. She completed her Bachelor of Arts degree in journalism from the Saint Mary-of-the-Woods College in Indiana in 1974, and started her career in journalism in Chicago.

During the course of her career, Myss interviewed Elisabeth Kübler-Ross, the author of the famous book On Death and Dying, which inspired her to pursue a master's degree in theology from Mundelein College, Chicago, which she completed in 1979. In 2008, she wrote the foreword to Kübler-Ross's revised version of "On Life After Death".

Myss started giving medical intuitive readings in 1982 and co-founded a small New Age publishing company, Stillpoint Publishing in Walpole, New Hampshire, where she also worked as an editor in 1983. Next she began consulting with holistic doctors, which in 1984, led to her extensive collaboration with C. Norman Shealy, physician and founder of the American Holistic Medical Association, with whom she later co-authored AIDS: Passageway to Transformation, in 1987, followed by The Creation of Health: The Emotional, Psychological, and Spiritual Responses that Promote Health and Healing, in 1988.

Deriving from her practice as a medical intuitive, Myss started writing books, in the field of energy medicine, and healing, five of which became New York Times Best Sellers. Myss wrote Anatomy of the Spirit: The Seven Stages of Power and Healing (1996), which was followed by Why People Don't Heal and How They Can (1998), which explored the reasons people do not heal through her concept of "woundology." Her next book, Sacred Contracts: Awakening Your Divine Potential (2002) dealt with the issue of finding one's life purpose, describing sacred contracts as a set of assignments to help one identify their particular spiritual archetypes. Myss has since appeared on The Oprah Winfrey Show numerous times.

By 2000, she discontinued doing private medical intuitive readings, and began teaching how to do them through her workshops, seminars, radio shows and guided tours. She tours internationally as a speaker on spirituality and mysticism, and lives in Oak Park, Illinois, near Chicago. In 2003, she founded the Caroline Myss Educational Institute (CMED) in Chicago, Illinois, with business partner David Smith, offering weekend workshops on her books and teachings.

Her 2007 book, "Entering the Castle" draws upon the writings of Saint Teresa of Ávila, a 16th-century Carmelite nun, who wrote her most important work, The Interior Castle (1577), towards the end of her life. Her next book, Defy Gravity, Healing Beyond the Bounds of Reason (2009) took the ideas further with mystical laws, the seven shadows and also seven graces inherent in all of us.

Myss started hosting a weekly Call-in Talk radio show, "Sacred Contracts" around 2005, at Hay House Radio, an Internet radio site, run by Hay House publishing, where she gave online intuitive readings to callers. Then in 2009, the show was renamed "Defy Gravity" after her book by the same name was released in October 2009.

In June 2012, Myss appeared on a Super Soul Sunday episode with Oprah Winfrey, on OWN Network.

== Criticism ==
In Michael Shermer's book The Skeptic: Encyclopedia of Pseudoscience, Phil Molé says "Caroline Myss offers no tangible evidence to support any of her claims. Her hypothetical energy system cannot be detected, her intuitive diagnostic abilities are unproven, and her holistic philosophy is riddled with inconsistencies and unsubstantiated judgments."

Joe Nickell, a skeptic and paranormal investigator, says, "Myss provides no proof of her alleged abilities. She intuits, of course, her intuitive power, offers only hearsay testimonials and anecdotal evidence as support." He has also described Myss as having "many of the traits associated with a fantasy prone personality."

== Books and recordings ==
Her first three books have consecutively been on The New York Times Best Seller list: Anatomy of the Spirit (1998), Why People Don't Heal and How They Can (1998), Sacred Contracts (2002)

- AIDS: Passageway to Transformation, with C. Norman Sheally, Stillpoint Publishing, Walpole, NH. 1987. ISBN 978-0-913299-47-0. ISBN 0-913299-47-2.
- The Creation of Health: The Emotional, Psychological, and Spiritual Responses that Promote Health and Healing, with C. Norman Sheally, Three Rivers Press, 1988. ISBN 0-609-80323-9.
- Anatomy of the Spirit: The Seven Stages of Power and Healing 1996; ISBN 978-0-609-80014-0
- Why People Don't Heal and How They Can, Three Rivers Press, 1997 (paperback); ISBN 978-0-609-80224-3
- The Creation of Health: The Emotional, Psychological, and Spiritual Responses That Promote Health and Healing, Three Rivers Press, 1998 (Audio CD); ISBN 978-0-609-80323-3
- Spiritual Power Spiritual Practice, Three Rivers Press, 1998 (audio cassette); ISBN 978-1-56455-647-9
- Spiritual Madness, Sounds True Audio, 2001 (audio CD); ISBN 978-1-56455-902-9
- Invisible Acts of Power: Personal Choices That Create Miracles, Free Press, 2002. ISBN 0-7432-6425-8.
- Sacred Contracts: Awakening Your Divine Potential (paperback); Three Rivers Press; 2003. ISBN 0-609-81011-1
- Archetype Cards, an 80 Card Deck with Instruction Booklet; copyright 2003; ISBN 1-4019-0184-0
- Three Levels of Power and How to Use Them, Sounds True Inc., 2004 (audio CD); ISBN 978-1-59179-235-2
- Invisible Acts of Power: Personal Choices that Create Miracles, Sounds True, 2004 (Audio CD); ISBN 978-1-59179-135-5
- Spiritual Power, Spiritual Practice, Sounds True, 2004. ISBN 1-59179-149-9.
- Entering the Castle: An Inner Path to God and your Soul, 2007, (hard cover); ISBN 978-0-7432-5532-5
- The Sacred Contract of America: Fulfilling the Vision of Our Mystic Founders, 2007, Sounds True. (Audio CD), ISBN 1-59179-606-7.
- Defy Gravity: Healing Beyond The Bounds Of Reason, Hay House, 2009, ISBN 1-4019-2290-2.
- Archetypes: Who Are You?, Hay House, 2013, ISBN 978-1401941086.

== Bibliography ==
- Foreword True Coming of Age: A Dynamic Process That Leads to Emotional Well-Being, Spiritual Growth, and Meaningful Relationships, by John T. Chirban. McGraw-Hill Professional, 2004. ISBN 0-07-142681-7.
- Made in Image of God – Caroline Myss The Fabric of the Future: Women Visionaries of Today Illuminate the Path to Tomorrow, by Mary Jane Ryan, Patrice (INT) Wynne, Ken Wilber, Published by Conari, 2000. ISBN 1-57324-197-0. Page 120-124.
- Online articles of Caroline Myss
- Why People Don't Heal and How They Can – Caroline Myss – Chapter 1 at The New York Times
- Foreword to Entering the Castle by Ken Wilber
- A Gift of Light, A Gift For The Soul... by Caroline Myss
- Caroline Myss articles at The Oprah Winfrey Show
- Caroline Myss articles at The Huffington Post

== Sources ==
- Myss.com – Biography of Myss
