= Cerminara =

Cerminara is a surname. Notable people with the surname include:

- Gina Cerminara (1914–1984), American author
- Kyle Cerminara, American wrestler and mixed martial artist
