= Edgar Cayce =

American clairvoyant (1877–1945)

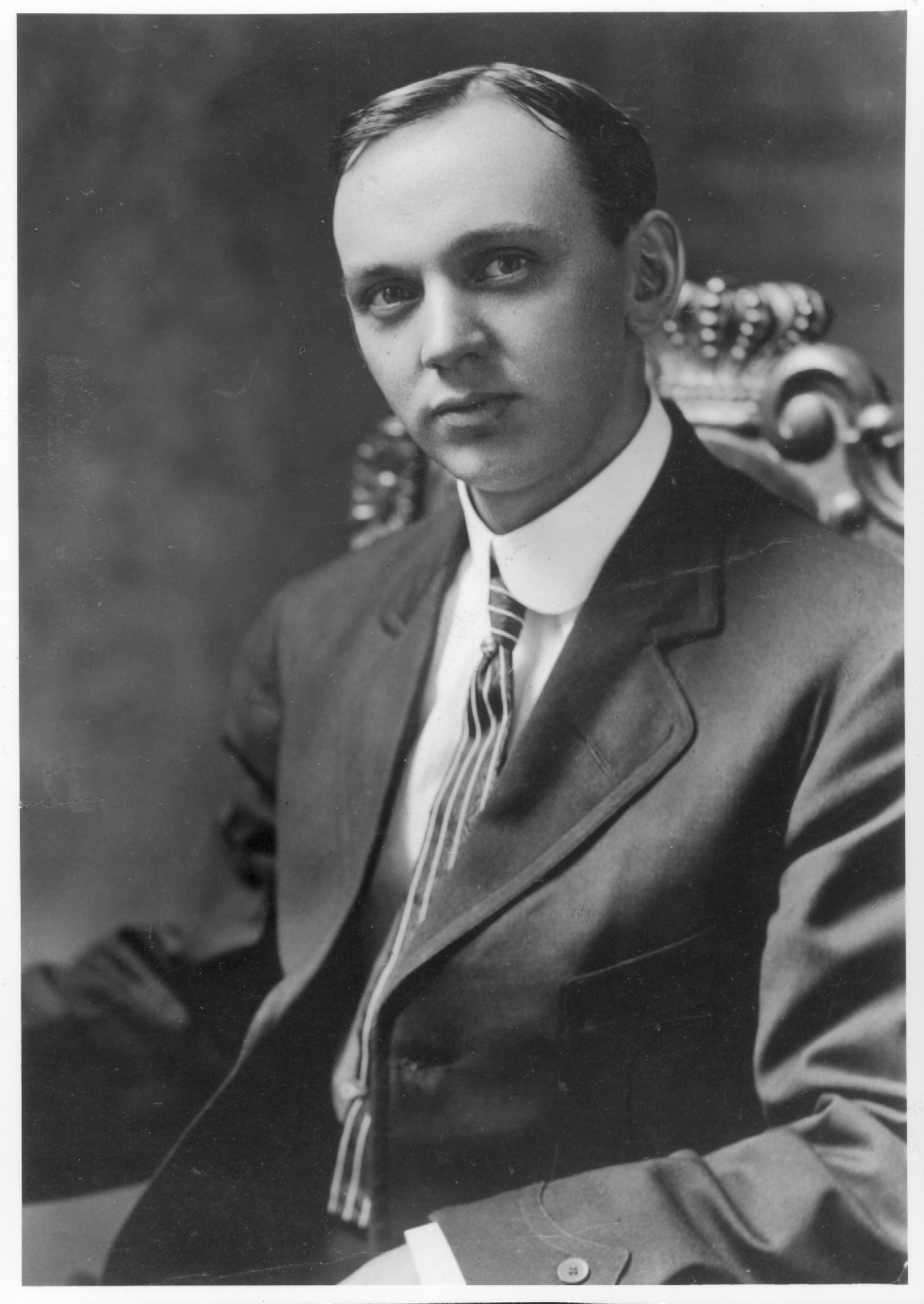
- Cayce c. 1910
- Born: March 18, 1877; Christian County, Kentucky, U.S.
- Died: January 3, 1945 (aged 67); Virginia Beach, Virginia, U.S.
- Resting place: Riverside Cemetery, Hopkinsville, Kentucky
- Occupations: Clairvoyant; Photographer; Sunday school teacher; Homeopath
- Organization: Founder of Association for Research and Enlightenment
- Spouse: Gertrude Evans (m. 1903–1945)
- Children: 3, including Hugh Lynn (1907–1982); Edgar Evans (1918–2013)
- Parent(s): Leslie B. Cayce; Carrie Cayce
- Website: edgarcayce.org

Edgar Cayce (/ˈkeɪsiː/; March 18, 1877 – January 3, 1945) was an American clairvoyant who reported and chronicled an ability to diagnose diseases and recommend treatments for ailments while asleep. During thousands of transcribed sessions, Cayce answered questions on subjects including healing, reincarnation, dreams, the afterlife, past lives, nutrition, Atlantis, and future events. Cayce said he was a devout Christian—reading the Bible once every year—and was not a spiritualist or communicating with spirits. Cayce is regarded as a founder of the New Age movement and a principal source of many of the movement's characteristic beliefs.

In 1931, Cayce founded a non-profit organization, the Association for Research and Enlightenment. In 1942, a popular and highly sympathetic biography of Cayce titled There is a River was published by journalist Thomas Sugrue.

== Background ==
Cayce was influenced by a variety of traditions and sources. During the Second Great Awakening, Thomas and Alexander Campbell founded the Disciples of Christ, a church which sought to restore the original Christian teachings and practices. Cayce was raised in the group.

Mesmerism influenced Phineas Parkhurst Quimby's New Thought Movement, which promoted the practice of medical clairvoyants. One of Quimby's patients, Mary Baker Eddy, later founded her own new religious movement, Christian Science. Spiritualism influenced Helena Blavatsky, the founder of Theosophy. Blavatksy's writings detailed topics like reincarnation, Atlantis, Root races, and the Akashic Records.

Homeopathy and Osteopathy were pseudoscientific forms of alternative medicine prevalent in Cayce's lifetime. Cayce would initially attribute his own healing to the care of an osteopath, and he later collaborated with one.

== Life ==
=== Overview ===
Edgar Cayce first achieved local notoriety for having lost his voice yet being able to speak during hypnosis. Initially, he reported that his voice had spontaneously and inexplicably returned on its own. Later, he began publicly crediting a local osteopath with having restored his voice. The osteopath employed Cayce as a medical clairvoyant who could reportedly diagnose patients at a distance through supernatural means. After declaring bankruptcy, Cayce returned to the role of medical clairvoyant, collaborating with homeopath Wesley Ketchum. In 1910, Ketchum's description of Cayce's readings was covered in a widely reprinted piece in The New York Times. After a falling out with Ketchum, Cayce traveled to Selma, Alabama. An additional collaboration with printer Arthur Lammers led Cayce to Dayton, Ohio. The final chapter of his life was spent in Virginia Beach, Virginia, where he oversaw an institute of his own creation.

An October 10, 1922, Birmingham Post-Herald article quotes Cayce as saying that he had given 8,056 readings to date. He recorded some 13,000 to 14,000 readings after that date. Other abilities attributed to Cayce include astral projection, prophecy, mediumship, access to the Akashic records, Book of Life, and seeing auras, astrology and dreamwork.

=== Early life in Kentucky ===
Cayce was born on March 18, 1877, in Christian County, Kentucky. His parents, Carrie Elizabeth (née Major) and Leslie Burr Cayce, were farmers and the parents of six children. Cayce was raised in the Disciples of Christ.

In December 1893, the Cayce family moved to Hopkinsville, Kentucky, where they lived at 705 West Seventh, on the southeast corner of Seventh and Young Streets. Cayce received an eighth-grade education. Cayce's education ended in ninth grade because his family could not afford the cost.

On March 14, 1897, Cayce became engaged to Gertrude Evans. In September, papers announced Cayce had taken a position with John P. Morton and left for Louisville. He began an apprenticeship at the photography studio of W. R. Bowles in Hopkinsville and became proficient in his trade.

=== Loss of voice ===
In February 1900, Hart the Laugh King, a stage hypnotist, performed in Hopkinsville. He would return to Hopkinsville in 1903. Decades later, Hart would be named as having hypnotized Cayce in an attempt to restore his voice.

According to a 1901 newspaper account, on the night of April 18, 1900, Cayce lost his voice and was unable to speak above a whisper. The condition reportedly forced him to leave his job as a salesman for work in photography instead. In May 1900, the local paper reported that Cayce had been unable to speak above a whisper except when under hypnosis, when his voice returned. In June, papers reported Cayce was attending business college in Louisville. On February 12, 1901, papers reported Cayce had awoken with his voice spontaneously and inexplicably recovered.

=== Relationship with Al Layne ===
The following year, in April 1902, Cayce authored a public endorsement that attributed his cured voice to the treatment of "Osteopath and Electro-Magnetical Doctor" A.C. Layne.

In May 1902, Cayce got a job in a bookshop in Bowling Green, Kentucky. He returned to Hopkinsville to visit his parents in September. The following January, he returned to the town to attend his sister's wedding.

Cayce married Gertrude Evans on June 17, 1903, and she moved to Bowling Green. By June 24, newspapers published stories of Cayce going into a trance to help Layne diagnose a patient who was not physically present. Cayce denied being a spiritualist, saying he was an active member of the Christian Church. An article from 1904 mentions Cayce's refusal to charge for medical readings. In 1904, Cayce claimed he had developed the card game Pit and sent it to Parker Brothers.

Cayce and his wife had three children: Hugh Lynn Cayce (1907–1982), Milton Porter Cayce (1911–1911), and Edgar Evans Cayce (1918–2013). Layne revealed the trance reading activity to the professionals at the boarding house (one of whom was a magistrate and journalist), and the state medical authorities forced him to close his practice. He left to acquire osteopathic qualifications in Franklin.

Cayce and a relative opened a photographic studio in Bowling Green, the studio burned down on December 25, 1906. His first son was born on March 16, 1907, and later that year, a second fire burned down the studio once again. In January 1908, he authored a query to the Nashville Banner newspaper about the phase of the moon at a certain time in 1864. In 1908, Cayce declared bankruptcy.

=== Relationship with Wesley Ketchum ===
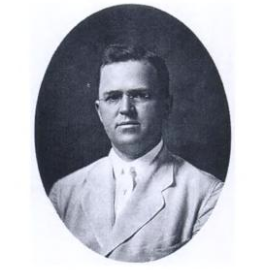
Photograph of Wesley Ketchum

Wesley Harrington Ketchum was born in Lisbon, Ohio, on November 11, 1878, to Saunders C. Ketchum and Bertha Bennett and was the oldest of seven children. He graduated from the Cleveland College of Homeopathic Medicine in 1904, and practiced medicine in Hopkinsville, Kentucky until 1912. Ketchum went to Honolulu, Hawaii via San Francisco in 1913 and opened a new practice. He returned to California in 1918 and established an office in Palo Alto, practicing there until the 1950s. Ketchum retired to southern California around 1963, settling in San Marino. In 1964, Ketchum wrote The Discovery of Edgar Cayce, published by the A.R.E. Press.

Ketchum was a homeopath who worked with Cayce from 1910 to 1912. After declaring bankruptcy, Cayce found work at the H. P. Tresslar photography firm.

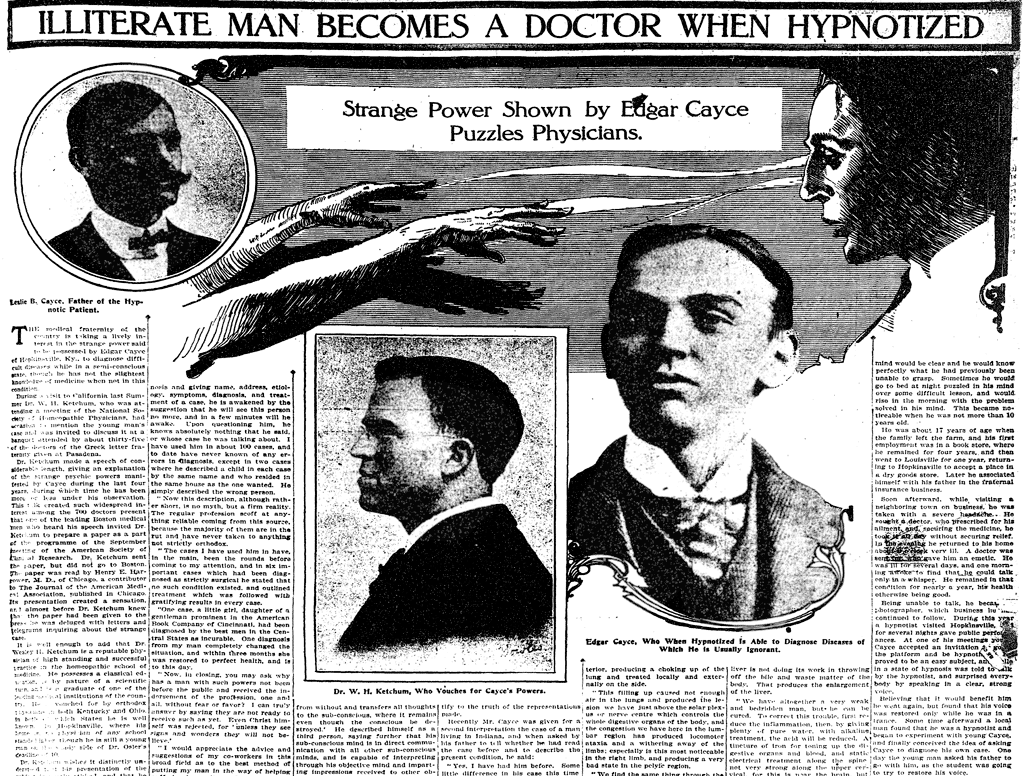
New York Times October 9, 1910 article on Edgar Cayce

In the fall of 1910, Cayce became the subject of increasing publicity for his medical readings. On October 9, 1910, Cayce was profiled by The New York Times in a story titled "Illiterate Man Becomes a Doctor When Hypnotized".

“The medical fraternity of the country is taking a lively interest in the strange power said to be possessed by Edgar Cayce of Hopkinsville, Ky., to diagnose difficult diseases while in a semi-conscious state, though he has not the slightest knowledge of medicine when not in this condition.

During a visit to California last Summer Dr. W. H. Ketchum, who was attending a meeting of the National Society of Homeopathic Physicians, had occasion to mention the young man's case and was invited to discuss it at a banquet attended by about thirty-five of the doctors of the Greek letter fraternity given at Pasadena.

Dr. Ketchum made a speech of considerable length, giving an explanation of the strange psychic powers manifested by Cayce during the last four years during which time he has been more or less under his observation. This talk created such widespread interest among the 700 doctors present that one of the leading Boston medical men who heard his speech invited Ketchum to prepare a paper as a part of the programme of the September meeting of the American Society of Clinical Research. Ketchum sent the paper, but did not go to Boston. The paper was read by Henry E. Harpower, M.D., of Chicago, a contributor to the Journal of the American Medical Association, published in Chicago. Its presentation created a sensation, and almost before Ketchum knew that the paper had been given to the press he was deluged with letters and telegrams inquiring about the strange case. ...

Dr. Ketchum wishes it distinctly understood that his presentation is purely ethical, and that he attempts no explanation of what must be classed as mysterious mental phenomena.

Dr. Ketchum is not the only physician who has had opportunity to observe the workings of Mr. Cayce's subconscious mind. For nearly ten years his strange power has been known to local physicians of all the recognized schools. An explanation of the case is best understood from Ketchum's description in his paper read in Boston a few days ago, which follows:

‘About four years ago I made the acquaintance of a young man 28 years old, who had the reputation of being a ‘freak.’ They said he told wonderful truths while he was asleep. I, being interested, immediately began to investigate, and as I was ‘from Missouri,’ I had to be shown.

‘And truly, when it comes to anything psychical, every layman is a disbeliever from the start, and most of our chosen profession will not accept anything of a psychic nature, hypnotism, mesmerism, or what not, unless vouched for by some M.D. away up in the profession and one whose orthodox standing is unquestioned.

‘My subject simply lies down and folds his arms, and by auto-suggestion goes to sleep. While in this sleep, which to all intents and purposes is a natural sleep, his objective mind is completely inactive and only his subjective is working.

‘By suggestion he becomes unconscious to pain of any sort, and, strange to say, his best work is done when he is seemingly ‘dead to the world.’

‘I next give him the name of my subject and the exact location of same, and in a few minutes he begins to talk as clearly and distinctly as any one. He usually goes into minute detail in diagnosing a case, and especially if it is a very serious case.

His language is usually of the best, and his psychologic terms and description of the nervous anatomy would do credit to any professor of nervous anatomy, and there is no faltering in his speech and all his statements are clear and concise. He handles the most complex ‘jaw breakers’ with as much ease as any Boston physician, which to me is quite wonderful, in view of the fact that while in his normal state he is an illiterate man, especially along the line of medicine, surgery, or pharmacy, of which he knows nothing.'”

On October 20, 1910, Hopkinsville papers announced Cayce's return to town, with his father handling the "business end of his hypnotic readings" as part of a stock company that he had set up. In November 1910, Cayce's photography studio was advertised in the local paper.

In 1911, the Kansas City Post reported that Layne had supposedly cured Cayce of an ailment by consulting Cayce's own reading while under hypnosis. On January 17, 1911, Cayce and his father gave a public demonstration at a suite in Louisville's Seelbach Hotel. In June, a Nashville newspaper advertised Cayce's readings.

In 1911, Cayce was briefly mentioned in an encyclopedia. In 1912, Cayce and his father filed suit for $28,000 in damages against A.D. Noe Sr. and Jr. who had been under contract to assist in the medical clairvoyant practice. On March 28, Cayce's second child was born; however, the baby died on May 17. Gertrude later became ill with tuberculosis. According to Cayce's account, he discovered in 1912 that Ketchum had gambled with their earnings. As a result, Cayce quit the company immediately and returned to the Tresslar photography firm in Selma, Alabama. In March 1913, the Evansville Courier and Press covered a breach of contract lawsuit involving Cayce's business under the headline Occult Powers Go Bankrupt - Suit for Breach of Contract Grows out of Peculiar Medical Diagnosis.

=== Selma period (1912–1923) ===
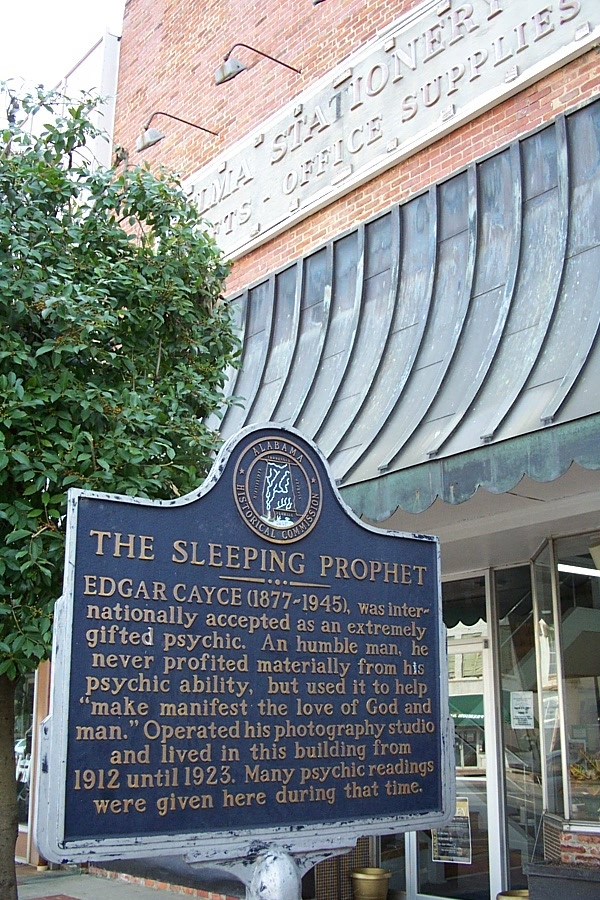
Historical marker in front of the Selma building that housed Cayce's studio, where he lived and worked from 1912 to 1923

On July 31, 1912, Cayce was elected as an officer of a Sunday School organization in Selma. In February 1915, local papers reported Cayce's voice had returned after three months of silence. On February 8, 1917, an event in New York was held supposedly receiving a telepathic message from Cayce, who was in Alabama. In 1920, Cayce's claims were published along with a suggestion that he would soon host Arthur Conan Doyle.

Cayce's increasing popularity attracted entrepreneurs who wanted to use his reported clairvoyance. Although he was reluctant to help them, he was persuaded to give readings; this left him dissatisfied with himself. A cotton merchant offered him a hundred dollars a day for readings about the cotton market but, despite his poor finances, Cayce refused the merchant's offer. Some people wanted to know where to hunt for treasure, and others wanted to know the outcome of horse races.

From 1920 to 1922, Cayce participated in attempts to use psychic powers to drill oil wells in San Saba, Texas. In May 1921, Texas papers announced plans for the Cayce Petroleum Company to begin drilling about six miles north of San Saba.

In June 1922, Cayce advertised free baby picture day at his studio in Selma. On October 10, 1922, Cayce was profiled about his medical clairvoyance. On October 18, papers reported Cayce had addressed a local writers group, covering topics like reincarnation and evolution of the soul. That month, Cayce addressed the Birmingham Theosophical Society. In November, he gave a talk to a Birmingham women's group. A local paper ran a statement by the "friends of Edgar Cayce" mentioning plans for a hospital in Birmingham.

In September 1923 he hired Gladys Davis, who would serve as his secretary for the next two decades, transcribing his readings in shorthand. By October, he was associated with the "Cayce Institute of Psychic Research".

=== Arthur Lammers and Dayton, Ohio period ===
Arthur Lammers, a wealthy printer and student of metaphysics, persuaded Cayce to give readings on philosophical subjects in 1923. He told Cayce that in his trance state, he spoke about Lammers' past lives and reincarnation (in which Lammers believed). Reincarnation was a popular contemporary subject, but is not an accepted part of Christian doctrine. Because of this, Cayce questioned his stenographer about what he said in his trance state and remained unconvinced. He challenged Lammers' statement that he had validated astrology and reincarnation:

Cayce: I said all that? ... I couldn't have said all that in one reading.
Lammers: No. But you confirmed it. You see, I have been studying metaphysics for years, and I was able by a few questions, by the facts you gave, to check what is right and what is wrong with a whole lot of the stuff I've been reading. The important thing is that the basic system which runs through all the religions, is backed up by you.

Cayce's stenographer recorded the following:

In this we see the plan of development of those individuals set upon this plane, meaning the ability to enter again into the presence of the Creator and become a full part of that creation.
Insofar as this entity is concerned, this is the third appearance on this plane, and before this one, as the monk. We see glimpses in the life of the entity now as were shown in the monk, in this mode of living. The body is only the vehicle ever of that spirit and soul that waft through all times and ever remain the same.

Cayce was unconvinced that he had been referring to reincarnation, but Lammers believed that the reading "open[ed] up the door" and continued to share his beliefs and knowledge with him. Lammers seemed intent upon convincing Cayce, because he felt that the reading confirmed his own strongly held beliefs.

Lammers asked Cayce to come to Dayton, Ohio to pursue metaphysical truth via the readings, and Cayce eventually agreed. Cayce produced considerable metaphysical information in Dayton, which he tried to reconcile with Christianity.

Lammers, who wanted to determine the purpose of Cayce's clairvoyant readings, wanted to put up money for an organization supporting Cayce's healing methods. Cayce decided to accept the work, and asked his family to join him in Dayton as soon as possible. By the time the Cayce family arrived near the end of 1923, however, Lammers was in financial difficulties.

At this time, Cayce directed himself to readings centered around health. The remedies reportedly channeled often involved electrotherapy, ultraviolet light, diet, massage, less mental work and more relaxation. They were noticed by the American Medical Association, and Cayce felt that it was time to legitimize his operations with the aid of licensed medical practitioners. He reported that in a trance in 1925, "the voice" advised him to move to Virginia Beach, Virginia. (Note: "Eventually Edgar Cayce, following advice from his own readings, moved to Virginia Beach, Virginia, and set up a hospital.")

=== Blumenthal as patron (1926–1931) ===
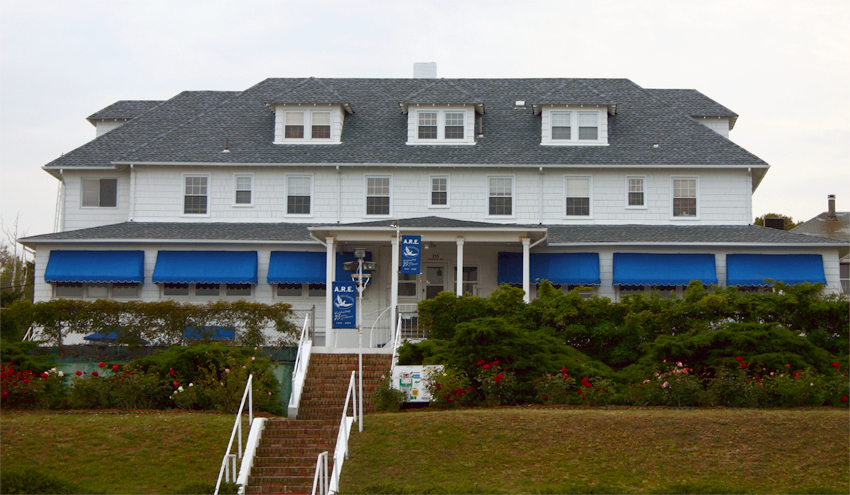
The Cayce Hospital in 2006

By 1925, Cayce was a professional psychic with a small staff of employees and volunteers. Cayce's readings increasingly had occult or esoteric themes. Morton Blumenthal (who worked at the New York Stock Exchange with his trader brother) became interested in the readings, shared Cayce's outlook, and offered to finance his vision; Blumenthal bought the Cayces a house in Virginia Beach.

The Association of National Investigations was incorporated in Virginia on May 6, 1927. Blumenthal was the president, and his brother and several others were vice presidents. Cayce was secretary and treasurer, and Gladys was assistant secretary. To protect against prosecution, anyone requesting a reading was required to join the association and agree that they were participating in an experiment in psychic research. Moseley Brown, head of the psychology department at Washington and Lee University, became convinced of the readings and joined the association in early 1928.

In August 1928, Edgar Cayce was listed as bible class teacher affiliated with the local presbyterian church. On October 11, 1928, the dedication ceremony of the hospital complex was held. The complex contained a lecture hall, library, vault for storage of the readings, and offices for researchers. There was also a large living room, a 12-car garage, servants' quarters, and a tennis court. It contained "the largest lawn, in fact the only lawn, between the Cavalier and Cape Henry". Its first patient was admitted the following day.

The facility enabled checking and rechecking the remedies, Cayce's goal. There were consistent remedies for many illnesses (regardless of the patient), and Cayce hoped to produce a compendium for use by the medical profession. Shankar A. Bhisey, a chemist who also used "clairvoyant knowledge" to produce medicines, collaborated with Cayce to produce atomidine.

The raison d'être for the cures was the "assimilation of needed properties through the digestive system, from food taken into the body ... [All treatments, including all schools and types of treatment, were given in order to establish] the proper equilibrium of the assimilating system." Salt packs, poultices, hot compresses, chromotherapy, magnetism, vibrator treatment, massage, osteopathic manipulation, dental therapy, colonics, enemas, antiseptics, inhalants, homeopathy, essential oils, and mud baths were prescribed. Substances included oils, salts, herbs, iodine, witch hazel, magnesia, bismuth, alcohol, castoria, lactated pepsin, turpentine, charcoal, animated ash, soda, cream of tartar, aconite, laudanum, camphor, and gold solution. These were prescribed to overcome conditions that prevented proper digestion and assimilation of needed nutrients from the prescribed diet. The aim of the readings was to produce a healthy body, removing the cause of a specific ailment. Readings would indicate if the patient's recovery was problematic.

There was a months-long waiting list. Blumenthal and Brown had ambitious plans for a university dwarfing the hospital and a "parallel service for the mind and spirit", rivaling other universities in respectability. The university was scheduled to open on September 22, 1930. On September 16, Blumenthal called a meeting of the association and took over the hospital to curb expenses. He ended his support of the university after the first semester, and closed the association on February 26, 1931. Cayce removed the files of his readings from the hospital and brought them home.

During the Depression, Cayce turned his attention to spiritual teachings. In 1931, his friends and family asked him how they could become psychic. In response, Cayce created "study groups" and developed spiritual lessons over the subsequent eleven years. In his altered state, Cayce relayed to the groups that the purpose of life is not to become psychic but to become a more spiritually aware and loving person. Study group number one was told that they could "bring light to a waiting world", and the lessons would still be studied in a hundred years. The readings were now about dreams, coincidence (synchronicity), developing intuition, the Akashic records, astrology, past-life relationships, soul mates and other esoteric subjects.

=== Association for Research and Enlightenment (ARE) ===
On June 6, 1931, 61 people attended a meeting to carry on Cayce's work and form the Association for Research and Enlightenment (ARE). In July, the new non-profit association was incorporated. Cayce returned his house to Blumenthal and bought another. In 1931, Cayce promoted a quack medicine formulation called Atomidine or nascent iodine.

People seeking a reading from Cayce were asked to join the ARE. This helped insulate Cayce from charges of fortune-telling, which was illegal in some U.S. states, as he was not directly charging a fee for his services but receiving a salary from the member-supported ARE. Apart from supporting Cayce and his staff, a major emphasis of the early ARE was the encouragement of small groups devoted to spiritual study, prayer, and meditation.

In November 1931, Cayce, wife Gertrude and secretary Gladys Davis were arrested for "pretending to tell fortunes." When charges were dismissed, papers noted that Cayce's readings included tales of ancient civilizations, including Ancient Egypt, El Dorado, and Atlantis; Cayces' readings described Bimini island as a mountaintop of Atlantis. In February 1932, Cayce gave a public lecture on the "Lost Continent of Atlantis".

The association's first annual congress was held in June 1932. Speakers discussed metaphysical and psychic subjects, and Cayce performed public readings.

==== Earth changes ====
From 1932 to 1936, Cayce predicted that the year 1936 would be a year of cataclysmic changes. In February 1933, Cayce predicted that San Francisco would be destroyed by earthquake in 1936. In April 1935, he lectured in the District of Columbia.

In 1935, they were again arrested, this time in Detroit for practicing medicine without a license; Cayce was given probation. In January 1936, Cayce gave a reading predicting the destruction of Los Angeles and San Francisco, followed by New York City. In March 1936, Cayce reported a dream:

I had been born again in 2100 A.D. in Nebraska. The sea apparently covered all of the western part of the country, as the city where I lived was on the coast. The family name was a strange one. At an early age as a child I declared myself to be Edgar Cayce who had lived 200 years before. Scientists, men with long beards, little hair, and thick glasses, were called in to observe me. They decided to visit the places where I said I had been born, lived, and worked in Kentucky, Alabama, New York, Michigan, and Virginia. Taking me with them the group of scientists visited these places in a long, cigar-shaped metal flying ship which moved at a high speed. Water covered part of Alabama. Norfolk, Virginia, had become an immense seaport. New York had been destroyed either by war or an immense earthquake and was being rebuilt. Industries were scattered over the countryside. Most of the houses were built of glass. Many records of my work as Edgar Cayce were discovered and collected. The group returned to Nebraska, taking the records with them to study... These changes in the earth will come to pass, for the time and times and half times are at an end, and there begins those periods for the readjustments.

==== Research library ====
Cayce's son Hugh Lynn proposed that they develop a library of research into the phenomena exhibited by his father and sponsor study groups, with Cayce doing two readings a day. The association accepted this, and Hugh Lynn began publishing a monthly bulletin for association members. The bulletin contained readings on general-interest subjects, interesting cases, book reviews on psychic subjects, health hints from readings, and news about psychic phenomena in other fields.

Hugh Lynn continued to build files of case histories, parallel studies in psychic phenomena, and research readings for the study groups.

Association activities remained simple. Members raised funds for an office, library and vault, which they added to the Cayce residence in 1940–41. Association membership averaged 500 to 600, with the annual turnover about 50 percent. The other half was a solid basis for research, an audience for case studies, pamphlets, and bulletins, including the congress bulletin, which was a yearbook and record of congress events. A mailing list of several thousand served people who remained interested in Cayce's activities.

Members were drawn from a wide variety of Christian denominations, theosophy, Christian Science, and Spiritualism. ARE did not oppose any religious organization.

Both sons served in the military during World War II, and both married: Hugh Lynn in 1941, and Edgar Evans in 1942.

=== 1942 biography ===
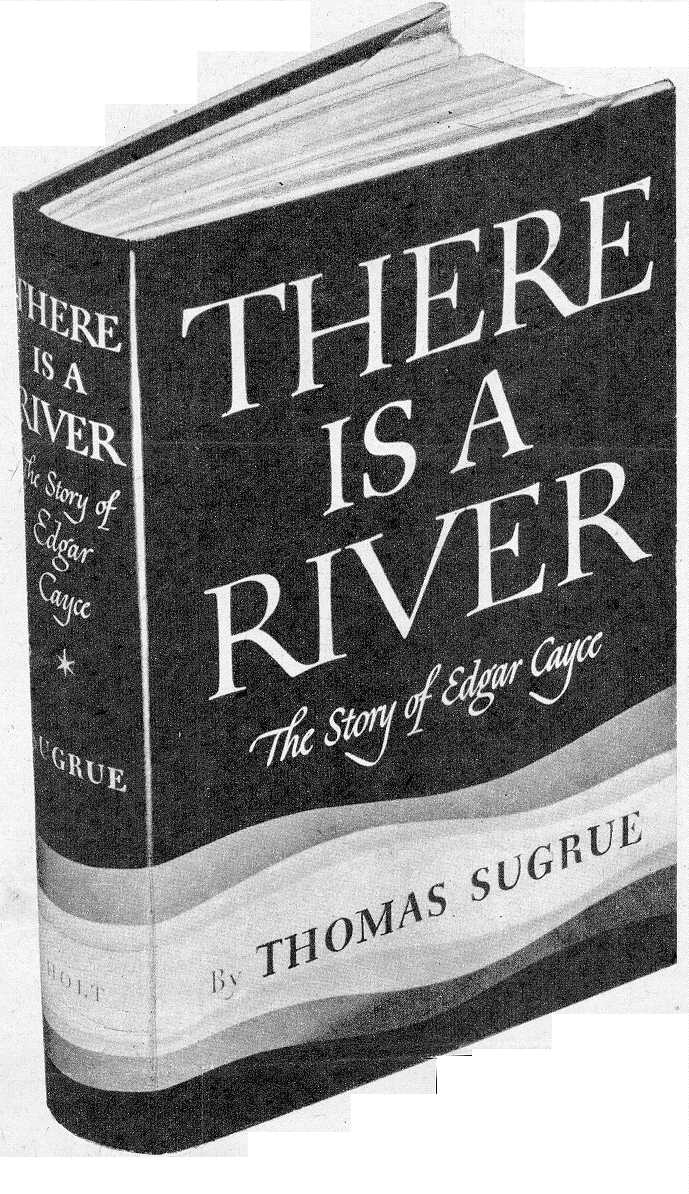
There Is a River, originally published in 1942

In March 1942, Thomas Sugrue's published There is a River, the only biography written during Cayce's lifetime. As a result, popular interest in Cayce increased.

==== Angelic visitation ====
According to the book, in May 1889, while reading the Bible in his hut in the woods, a young Cayce 'saw' a woman with wings who told him that his prayers were answered, and asked him what he wanted most of all. He was frightened, but he said that most of all he wanted to help others, especially sick children. He decided he would like to be a missionary.

==== Sleep-learning ====
According to the book, the next night, after a complaint from the school teacher, his father ruthlessly tested him for spelling, eventually knocking him out of his chair with exasperation. At that point, Cayce 'heard' the voice of the lady who had appeared the day before. She told him that if he could sleep a little 'they' could help him. He begged for a rest and put his head on the spelling book. When his father came back into the room and woke him up, he knew all the answers. In fact, he could repeat anything in the book. His father thought he had been fooling before and knocked him out of the chair again. Eventually, Cayce used all his school books that way. By 1892, the teacher regarded Cayce as his best student. On being questioned, Cayce told the teacher that he saw pictures of the pages in the books. His father became proud of this accomplishment and spread it around, resulting in Cayce becoming "different" from his peers.

==== First self-healing ====
According to the book, shortly after this, Cayce exhibited an ability to diagnose in his sleep. He was struck on the base of the spine by a ball in a school game, after which he began to act very strangely, and eventually was put to bed. He went to sleep and diagnosed the cure, which his family prepared and which cured him as he slept. However, this ability was not demonstrated again for several years.

==== Voice restored ====
According to Sugrue's text, local hypnotist Al Layne offered to help Cayce regain his voice. When Layne put Cayce into trance, Cayce communicated vocally. Cayce told Layne to give him (Cayce) a suggestion to increase blood circulation to his throat. Layne gave the suggestion; Cayce's throat reportedly turned bright red, and after 20 minutes Cayce (still in a trance) declared the treatment over. On awakening, his voice was said to have remained normal. Relapses occurred, but were reportedly corrected by Layne until the cure was eventually permanent.

Layne asked Cayce to describe Layne's ailments and suggest cures, and reportedly found the results accurate and effective. Layne considered Cayce's ability clairvoyance, and suggested that he offer his psychic diagnostic service to the public. Cayce was reluctant, since he had no idea what he was prescribing while asleep and did not know if his remedies were safe. He told Layne that he did not want to know anything about a patient, since it was not relevant. He agreed on the condition that readings would be free, and specified that if the readings ever hurt anyone, he would never do another. He began, with Layne's help, to offer free treatments to the townspeople. Layne described Cayce's method as "... a self-imposed hypnotic trance which induces clairvoyance". Reports of Cayce's work appeared in newspapers, which prompted a number of postal inquiries. Cayce said that he could work as effectively with a letter from an individual as with a person present in the room. Given a person's name and location, Cayce claimed that he could diagnose the physical and mental conditions of what he called "the entity" and provide a remedy. Cayce was still reticent and worried, because "one dead patient was all he needed to become a murderer". His fiancée agreed, and few people knew what he was doing. Hypnotic subjects were commonly believed to be susceptible to insanity or poor physical health.

=== Final years ===
Cayce attained further national prominence in 1943 after the publication of "Miracle Man of Virginia Beach" in Coronet magazine.

From June 1943 to June 1944, Cayce did 1,385 readings.

In August 1944, Cayce collapsed. When he took a reading on his situation, he was instructed to rest until he was well or dead. He and Gertrude went to the Virginia mountains, where he had a stroke in September. He died on January 3, 1945, at age 67. Cayce was buried in Riverside Cemetery in Hopkinsville, Kentucky. His wife Gertrude died three months later.

=== 1999 posthumous publication ===
Approximately half a century after Cayce's death it was discovered he had written an autobiographic memoir about his life. The memoir was compiled and edited by A. Robert Smith and published by St. Martin's Press under the title My Life as a Seer: The Lost Memoirs. This memoir was later made available in e-book form by Macmillan Publishers. It can be viewed in the Internet Archive.

== Legacy ==
Gina Cerminara wrote the 1950 book, Many Mansions, which explores Cayce's work. In 1963, psychic Ruth Montgomery popularized Cayce's catastrophic predictions she described as a 'polar shift'. In 1967, journalist Jess Stearn authored a Cayce biography titled The Sleeping Prophet. A book on Cayce and Atlantis was published in 1968. In 1968, Curt Gentry's novel The Last Days of the Late, Great State of California told of a cataclysmic California earthquake that had been foretold by Cayce in 1941.

In 1970, David Kahn's work My Life With Edgar Cayce was posthumously published. 1970 saw the publication of a book on Cayce's readings on the Dead Sea Scrolls. Cayce's two sons, Edgar Evans Cayce and Hugh Lynn Cayce, wrote The Outer Limits of Edgar Cayce's Power in 1971. In 1974, Cayce's predictions were cited in a book titled California Superquake: 1975-77. In 1978, Cayce's followers reported a collaboration with Stanford Research Institute, a psychic research group unaffiliated with Stanford University. In the 1980s, New Age author Lori Toye popularized the "I Am America" map inspired by Cayce's prediction of Earth Changes.

Religious historian Mitch Horowitz credits Cayce with popularizing core themes of New Age spirituality, particularly the concept of religious universalism, noting in 2019: "Cayce's teachings sought to marry a Christian moral outlook with the cycles of karma and reincarnation central to Hindu and Buddhist ways of thought, as well as the Hermetic concept of man as an extension of the Divine. Cayce's references elsewhere to the causative powers of the mind — 'the spiritual is the LIFE; the mental is the BUILDER; the physical is the RESULT' — melded his cosmic philosophy with tenets of New Thought, Christian Science, and mental healing."

== Reception and controversy ==
=== Pseudohistory ===
Cayce advocated pseudohistorical ideas in his trance readings, such as the existence of lost continents Lemuria, Mu and Atlantis and the discredited theory of polygenism. In many trance sessions, he reinterpreted the history of life on earth. One of Cayce's controversial theories was polygenism. According to Cayce, five races (white, black, red, brown, and yellow) were created separately and simultaneously on different parts of Earth. He accepted the existence of aliens and Atlantis (saying that "the red race developed in Atlantis and its development was rapid"), and he believed that "soul-entities" on Earth intermingled with animals to produce "things" such as giants which were as tall as 12 feet (3.7 m). Cayce predicted "Earth Changes", a series of cataclysmic events including a polar shift that would lead Atlantis to rise from the sea.

In his 2003 book The Skeptic's Dictionary, philosopher and skeptic Robert Todd Carroll wrote: "Cayce is one of the main people responsible for some of the sillier notions about Atlantis." Carroll cited some of Cayce's discredited ideas, including his belief in a giant crystal (activated by the sun to harness energy and provide power on Atlantis) and his prediction that in 1958, the United States would rediscover a death ray which had been used on Atlantis.

During the 1930s, Cayce incorrectly predicted that North America would experience existential chaos: "Los Angeles, San Francisco ... will be among those that will be destroyed before New York". He also predicted that the Second Coming of Christ would occur in 1998.

=== Clairvoyance ===
Science writers and skeptics say that Cayce's reported psychic abilities were faked or non existent.

Evidence of Cayce's reported clairvoyance was derived from newspaper articles, affidavits, anecdotes, testimonials and books, rather than empirical evidence which can be independently evaluated. Martin Gardner wrote that the "verified" claims and descriptions from Cayce's trances can be traced to ideas in books he had been reading by authors such as Carl Jung, P. D. Ouspensky, and Helena Blavatsky. Gardner concluded that Cayce's trance readings contain "little bits of information gleaned from here and there in the occult literature, spiced with occasional novelties from Cayce's unconscious".

Michael Shermer wrote in Why People Believe Weird Things (1997), "Uneducated beyond the ninth grade, Cayce acquired his broad knowledge through voracious reading and from this he wove elaborate tales." According to Shermer, "Cayce was fantasy-prone from his youth, often talking with angels and receiving visions of his dead grandfather." Magician James Randi said, "Cayce was fond of expressions like 'I feel that' and 'perhaps'—qualifying words used to avoid positive declarations." (Note: "The matter of Edgar Cayce boils down to a vague mass of garbled data, interpreted by true believers who have a very heavy stake in the acceptance of the claims. Put to the test, Cayce is found to be bereft of powers. His reputation today rests on poor and deceptive reporting of the claims made by him and his followers, and such claims do not stand up to examination.") According to investigator Joe Nickell,

Although Cayce was never subjected to proper testing, ESP pioneer Joseph B. Rhine of Duke University—who should have been sympathetic to Cayce's claims—was unimpressed. A reading that Cayce gave for Rhine's daughter was notably inaccurate. Frequently, Cayce was even wider off the mark, as when he provided diagnoses of subjects who had died since the letters requesting the readings were sent.

Cayce's Association for Research and Enlightenment has also been criticized for promoting pseudoscience.

=== Diet ===
Health experts are critical of Cayce's unorthodox treatments, such as his promotion of pseudoscientific dieting and homeopathic remedies, which they consider quackery. (Note: "Some quacks, such as Edgar Cayce, attributed their powers to God. Cayce, who made his diagnoses while in trance, claimed that his healing powers came from God. To treat patients he used spinal manipulation as well as Red Bug Juice and Oil of Smoke in his cures.") Science writer Karen Stollznow wrote,

The reality is that his cures were hearsay and his treatments were folk remedies that were useless at best and dangerous at worse ... Cayce wasn't able to cure his own cousin, or his own son who died as a baby. Many of Cayce's readings took place after the patient had already died.

Cayce advocated the pseudoscientific ideas of food combining and the alkaline diet. He emphasized maintaining an acid-alkaline balance by eating a diet of 80% alkaline forming foods. He stated that certain foods should not be eaten together for example, milk cannot be consumed with citrus fruits, coffee must not be taken with cream or milk and sugary foods cannot be taken with starchy foods. Cayce also held the view that even nutritious foods can poison the body if the person is in a negative frame of mind.

== Timeline ==
- 1901 – Report on having lost voice
- 1902 – Moved to Bowling Green, Kentucky
- 1903 – Married to Gertrude Evans on June 17
- 1904 – Opened photography studio in Bowling Green
- 1909 – Moved to Alabama
- 1910 – The New York Times published an article on Cayce: "Illiterate Man Becomes a Doctor When Hypnotized"
- 1910 – Returned to Hopkinsville to work as medical clairvoyant
- 1911 – Report on having his voice restored by his own medical clairvoyance
- 1912 – Moved to Selma, Alabama
  - Cayce Petroleum Company to find oil in Texas
  - National lecture tour
- 1917 – Association of National Investigators Inc. (ANI) founded in May
- 1923 – Met Arthur Lammers
- 1925 – Moved to Virginia Beach in September
- 1929 – Cayce hospital opened in February
- 1930 – Atlantic University chartered in May
- 1931 – ANI, Hospital and University collapse
- 1931 – Association for Research and Enlightenment, Inc.
- 1935 – Cayce, wife, son arrested in Detroit; Cayce convicted of practicing medicine without license, given probation
- 1942 – Cayce biography There is a River published in December
- 1943 – Cayce article "Miracle Man of Virginia Beach" published in September issue of Coronet
- 1944 – Cayce suffered a stroke in September
- 1945 – Cayce died on January 3
- 1999 - Cayce autobiography "My Life as a Seer; The Lost Memoirs" is published posthumously.

== See also ==
- Joseph Smith, founder of Mormonism
- Samuel Hahnemann, founder of Homeopathy
- Helena Blavatsky, founder of Theosophy
- Daniel David Palmer, founder of Chiropractic
- John Harvey Kellogg, director of the Battle Creek Sanitarium
- W. D. Fard, founder of the Nation of Islam
- L. Ron Hubbard, founder of Dianetics and Scientology
- Atlantic University, institution based on Cayce's teachings-->
