= Eugene Exman =

American publisher

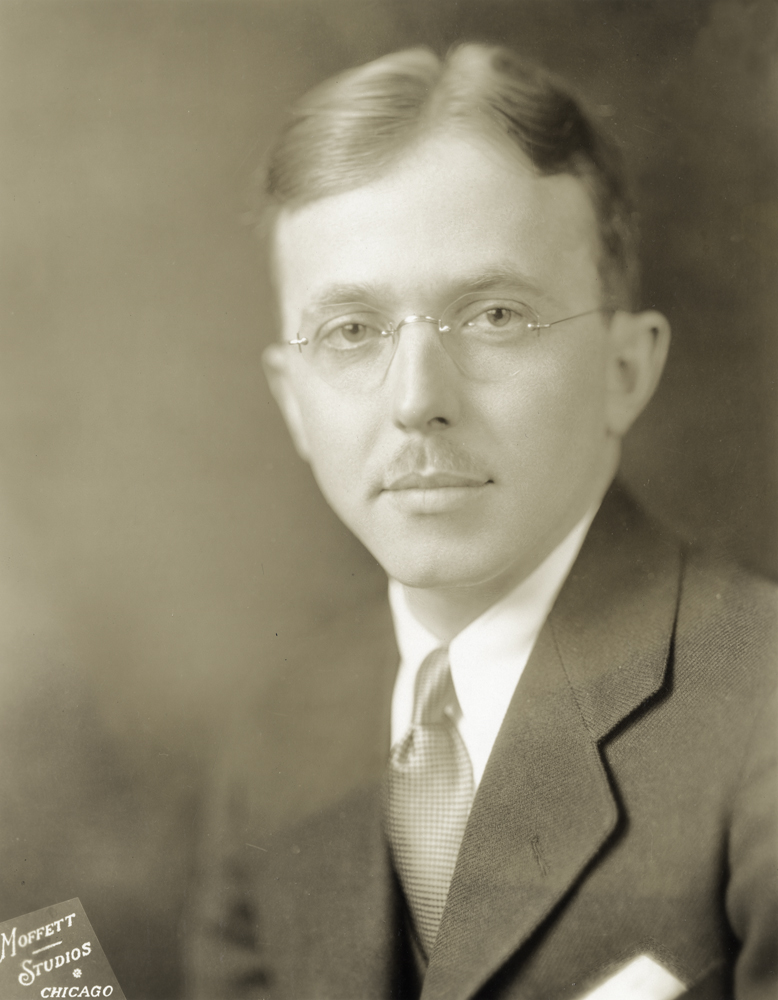
- Exman in the 1920s
- Born: July 1, 1900; Blanchester, Ohio
- Died: 10 October 1975 (aged 75); Providence, Rhode Island
- Occupation: Publisher
- Employer: Harper & Row

Eugene Exman (1 July 1900 – 10 October 1975) was a publisher and head of the religious books department for Harper & Row, where he worked with many prominent authors.

According to scholar Stephen Prothero, Exman helped transform the American religious landscape and was "the undisputed standard-bearer for religion publishing in the United States" who cleared the way for the "spiritual but not religious" identity claimed by more than a quarter of American adults today.

== Biography ==
Exman was born in Blanchester, Ohio on July 1, 1900. In his late teens, he had a spiritual experience in which he felt he saw God, and spent the rest of his life trying to understand and recreate the experience, in the process meeting many people who had similar mystical experiences, and turning them into bestselling authors.

Exman graduated from Denison University in 1922 and the University of Chicago in 1925, where he received his master's degree. His career in publishing began in the editorial department of the University of Chicago Press, before becoming the editor and manager of the religious books department of Harper & Bros in 1928. He became director of the department from 1944 to 1955 and vice president from 1955 to 1965.

Exman worked with and published authors such as Harry Emerson Fosdick, Dorothy Day, Howard Thurman, Albert Schweitzer, Martin Luther King Jr., Bill Wilson, Teilhard de Chardin, Paul Tillich, Karl Barth, Gerald Heard, Aldous Huxley, D.T. Suzuki, Jiddu Krishnamurti, Friedrich Schleiermacher, Abraham Joshua Heschel, Mircea Eliade, Swami Prabhavanada, and others. Exman's work became extremely influential, such as helping King become a bestseller with Stride Toward Freedom, and later Strength to Love and Why We Can't Wait. He broadened Harper's religious publishing from works aimed predominantly at Protestant denominations to a much wider audience including Buddhist, Hindu, Jewish, and Catholic works. Exman's editorial notes often encouraged authors to make their writings more accessible to everyday readers from all backgrounds.

In addition to his work publishing, Exman's own spiritual search for meaning led him to travel to India several years before the Beatles made it popular, and to experiment with LSD before Timothy Leary’s acid evangelism. In 1952, Exman received an honorary Doctor of Religious Education degree from Middlebury College. He served as a trustee of Denison University, Wainwright House, and Sturgis Library, as well as president of the later; and was director of the Cape Cod Conservatory of Music and the Barnstable Civic Association. He was also a member of the Wheaton College library visiting committee and the Century Association. Exman retired from publishing in 1965, but worked as an archivist and historian for Harper, publishing two books on the company, The Brothers Harper: A Unique Publishing Partnership (1965) and The House of Harper: The Making of a Modern Publisher (1967). He died on October 10, 1975.

== Legacy ==
Exman's work in publishing helped transform the American religious landscape according to scholar Stephen Prothero, who wrote a biography of Exman and called him "the undisputed standard-bearer for religion publishing in the United States". Prothero argues that Exman saw the personal connection to the divine as essential to religion, and in publishing books exploring this, he cleared the way for the "spiritual but not religious" identity claimed by more than a quarter of American adults today.
