= Medical intuitive =

Medical Intuition Ability

A medical intuitive is an alternative medicine practitioner who is purported to be able to use their intuitive abilities to find the cause of a physical or emotional condition through the use of insight rather than modern medicine. Other terms for such a person include medical clairvoyant or medical psychic.

== History ==
The practice of claiming to use intuition or clairvoyance for medical information dates back to Phineas Parkhurst Quimby (1802–1866), whose intuitive healing practice began in 1854. Edgar Cayce (1877–1945) was known as one of the most well known medical clairvoyants. William M. Branham, the father of the Pentecostal Latter Rain Movement, was said by his followers to be able to discern the health condition of people that attended his services, and in many cases heal them of their affliction.

== Reception ==
Making a formal medical diagnosis is not a practice for many medical intuitives. In a few cases medical intuitives have been hired by hospitals, clinics and medical offices, particularly in California. Many medical professionals and psychologists attribute perceived anecdotal successes by medical intuitives to a combination of wishful thinking, confirmation bias, the placebo effect, and regression fallacy associated with self-limiting conditions.

A few educational institutions offer graduate degrees that include "research-based training" and certifications for medical intuitives. Other medical intuitives may be licensed medical professionals and their ability to accurately diagnose diseases and heal may not be supported by scientific evidence.

In 2009 Steven Novella, writing on Science Based Medicine, calls medical intuitive diagnosis as "purely magical thinking" and refers to a Huffington Post article about it as "a promotion of a dubious pseudoscientific medical claim".

== See also ==
- Energy medicine
- Faith healing
- Psychic
