= Nascent iodine (dietary supplement) =

Liquid, orally administered, supplemental form of iodine

Nascent Iodine, sometimes known by the generic term atomic iodine, the generic trademark name Atomidine, or by the misname detoxified iodine, is a liquid orally administered supplemental form of iodine, claimed to be in the monatomic state, originating from a 1931 Edgar Cayce formula. There is no evidence that "Nascent Iodine" is in any way distinct or superior to tincture of iodine. The promotion of "Nascent Iodine" is a form of quackery.

== Criticism ==
In 1929 the FDA Bureau of Chemistry stated on Atomidine advertised health claims "As far as our records go, all of these claims are without a scintilla of printed scientific evidence to substantiate the claim that Atomidine is superior or even the equal to tincture of iodine...".

The concept of nascent state is obsolete. Thus, the name nascent iodine is a misrepresentation.
