= Association for Research and Enlightenment =

Organization devoted to American clairvoyant Edgar Cayce

Coordinates: 36°53′34″N 75°59′24″W

The Association for Research and Enlightenment (A.R.E.), also known as Edgar Cayce's A.R.E., is a non-profit organization founded in 1931 by clairvoyant Edgar Cayce to explore spirituality, holistic health, and other psychic topics, as well as preserving historical resources, including Cayce’s psychic readings.

A.R.E. engages in holistic health services, workshops, conferences and retreats, and publishes materials relating to Edgar Cayce and his teachings. Its headquarters is in Virginia Beach, Virginia, in the United States, and there are reportedly Edgar Cayce Centers in 37 countries.

A.R.E founded Atlantic University, which is located in its headquarters, and runs a health center and day spa at its headquarters, along with a school of massage.

A.R.E. Headquarters at Dusk

== History ==
A.R.E. is the heir to a previous Cayce-related organization, the Association of National Investigators (A.N.I.). Dependent on the financial support of a few major donors, the ANI emphasized major institution-building projects such as the original Atlantic University and the Cayce Hospital for Research and Enlightenment, a hospital staffed with medical personnel who used Cayce-recommended treatments. The name of the hospital would later inspire the name, Association for Research and Enlightenment. The ANI and its various projects folded with the onset of the Great Depression.

In 1931, Cayce called a meeting of his supporters in Virginia Beach, asking them directly whether they felt that his work should continue. The result was the creation of the Association for Research and Enlightenment as a successor organization to the A.N.I. This was also the beginning of a tradition of annual meetings at A.R.E.'s Virginia Beach headquarters featuring talks on various spiritual subjects.

Prior to Cayce's death in 1945, people seeking a reading from Cayce were asked to join the A.R.E. This helped insulate Cayce from charges of fortune-telling, which was illegal in some U.S. states, as he was not directly charging a fee for his services but receiving a salary from the member-supported A.R.E. Apart from supporting Cayce and his staff, a major emphasis of the early A.R.E. was the encouragement of small groups devoted to spiritual study, prayer, and meditation.

When Cayce died, he left many requests for readings unanswered. His son, Hugh Lynn Cayce, returned from the Army later that year and took charge of the A.R.E. Under Hugh Lynn Cayce's leadership, the A.R.E. arrived at the basic focus of activities and interests which it follows today. A major boost came with the rise of the 1960s counterculture and then the New Age Movement, which coincided with a number of popular books on Cayce including Jess Stearn's best seller, The Sleeping Prophet.

A.R.E. reached a height in its popularity in the late 1980s, which was the peak of the New Age movement. During this period membership came close to 100,000, though the core membership was stated to be closer to 30,000, since most of that number was recruited during a one-time direct mail campaign. During the 1990s the membership of the organization declined however, corresponding with the decline of the New Age movement. In 2001 the membership total was reported to be 21,353.

After Hugh Lynn's retirement in 1977 the A.R.E. was led by his son, Charles Thomas Cayce. Charles Thomas retired in 2006. In 2007 Kevin J. Todeschi became CEO and executive director, who was previously the editor of the A.R.E. membership magazine, Venture Inward, and a long-time A.R.E. staffer.

In 2001 it was reported by The Virginian-Pilot that the organization was experiencing difficulties relating to a lawsuit from former leaders that were accused of instituting Christian Fundamentalism into the organization, and budgetary issues resulting from deficit spending.

In 2014 renovations costing $7.5 million were completed at the Virginia Beach campus, which included a renovation of the Health Centre and Spa and de Laski Education Center. The renovations were funded by donations to the C.R.E.A.T.E campaign, an initiative aiming to raise $30 million in total.

In 2016 the Houston Chronicle reported that the A.R.E. had announced that it was shutting down the Houston branch, for reasons that were unclear, but which one follower attributed potentially to concerns about profitability. Some of the followers in Houston expressed their intention to create their own independent organization as a substitute. The Houston Chronicle reported that the local network of followers consisted of 800 people.

During the last few decades, the A.R.E. has focused its efforts on globalizing its activities and promoting Cayce's spiritual message in the mass media.

In 2021 A.R.E. was the subject of multiple lawsuits alleging sexual assault and sexual harassment at their Virginia summer camp, which alleged that the organization had enabled a culture that allowed this to occur. CEO Kevin Todeschi retired in the wake of these allegations, and in 2022 Rev. Nicole Charles was appointed as the new CEO.

== Activities ==
Activities of the A.R.E. include:

- Magazine Venture Inward
- Lectures and tours at headquarters in Virginia Beach
- Health Center & Spa at Virginia Beach campus
- Archiving readings of Edgar Cayce
- Facilitating research into the Cayce material
- Publishing materials through A.R.E. Press and 4th Dimension Press
- Cayce/Reilly School of Massage
- Atlantic University (nonprofit higher education online university with masters in transpersonal studies)
- A summer camp for children, teens, families, and adults

== Structure ==
The A.R.E. is led by a board of trustees. The same board also heads a sister organization, the Edgar Cayce Foundation, which claims to hold the copyright to the Cayce readings and related material. (Critics point out that Cayce himself freely distributed the same material without copyright.) Books using extensive (>500 words) Cayce quotes may be expected to pay royalties.

Within the United States and Canada, A.R.E. activities are divided into 11 multi-state / multi-provincial regions and 3 major metropolitan areas. Their relationship with Virginia Beach is that of a branch office to headquarters. Overseas, there are presently 29 Edgar Cayce Centers in 25 countries and another 37 countries with a lesser degree of A.R.E. representation.

Study groups and the Glad Helpers group are organizationally independent of A.R.E. headquarters and in fact pre-date that organization. They do, however, cooperate to some degree. For example, A.R.E. headquarters refers inquirers to study groups, while study groups may donate money or encourage their participants to join the A.R.E.

== Study groups ==
Cayce study groups usually meet weekly in members' homes. This occurs when no central place of gathering was available, such as in the A.R.E. of NYC at 241 West 30th Street. Traditional Cayce groups include The Dream Group, The Prayers for Healing Group, and Search for God. About half of the Prayers for Healing & Search for God meetings are generally devoted to the study of some appropriate Cayce text, traditionally the two volumes of A Search For God. These consist of lessons that Study Group #1 put together with guidance from the sleeping Cayce (who refused to allow them to continue until he felt that they were successfully living the spiritual lessons already given). Often, study group members will attempt to apply the lessons in their lives, just as the first group did.

Usually, the other half of the Prayers for Healing meetings will be given over to meditation and recitation of names of those who wished for healing. Several prayers are often recited, including the Lord's Prayer and the Twenty-Third Psalm ("The Lord is my shepherd..."). The mediation during the second half can also apply to the Search for God group. Despite the prevalence of Christian traditions, a significant number of A.R.E. members are Jews or other non-Christians.

The Dream Group attempts to apply the Cayce philosophy to the interpretation of dreams. The group will take turns sharing their dreams and, based on the methods outlined in his texts, attempt to interpret their own. Later, the group will share ideas and feedback about whether the symbols and patterns were accurately interpreted. These groups are no charge, but donations are appreciated.

== Symbol ==
The original A.R.E. symbol consisted of a white cross and dove on a blue background. In 2007, this was changed to a dove and globe.

== Buildings ==
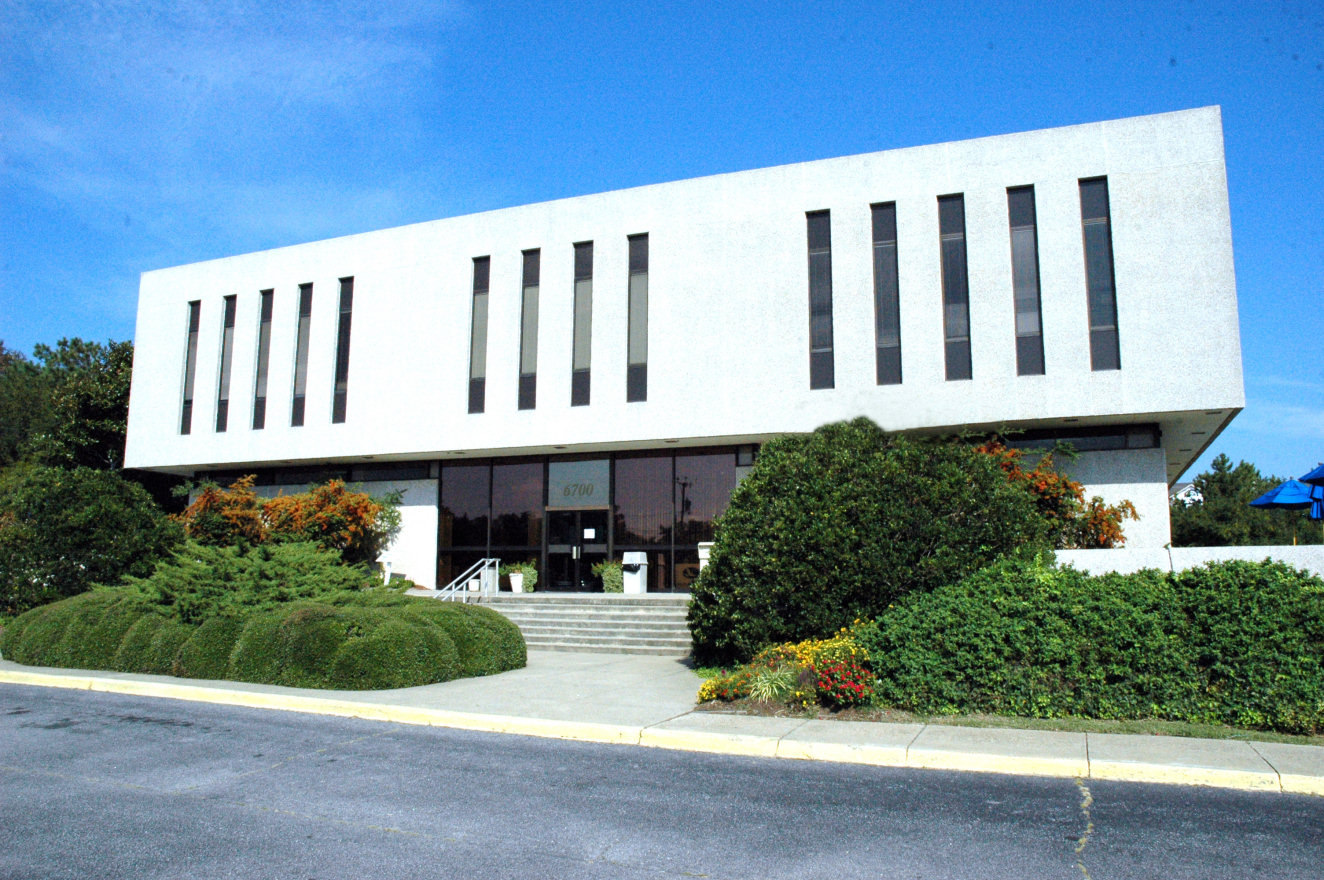
ARE's Visitor Center in Virginia Beach, Va.

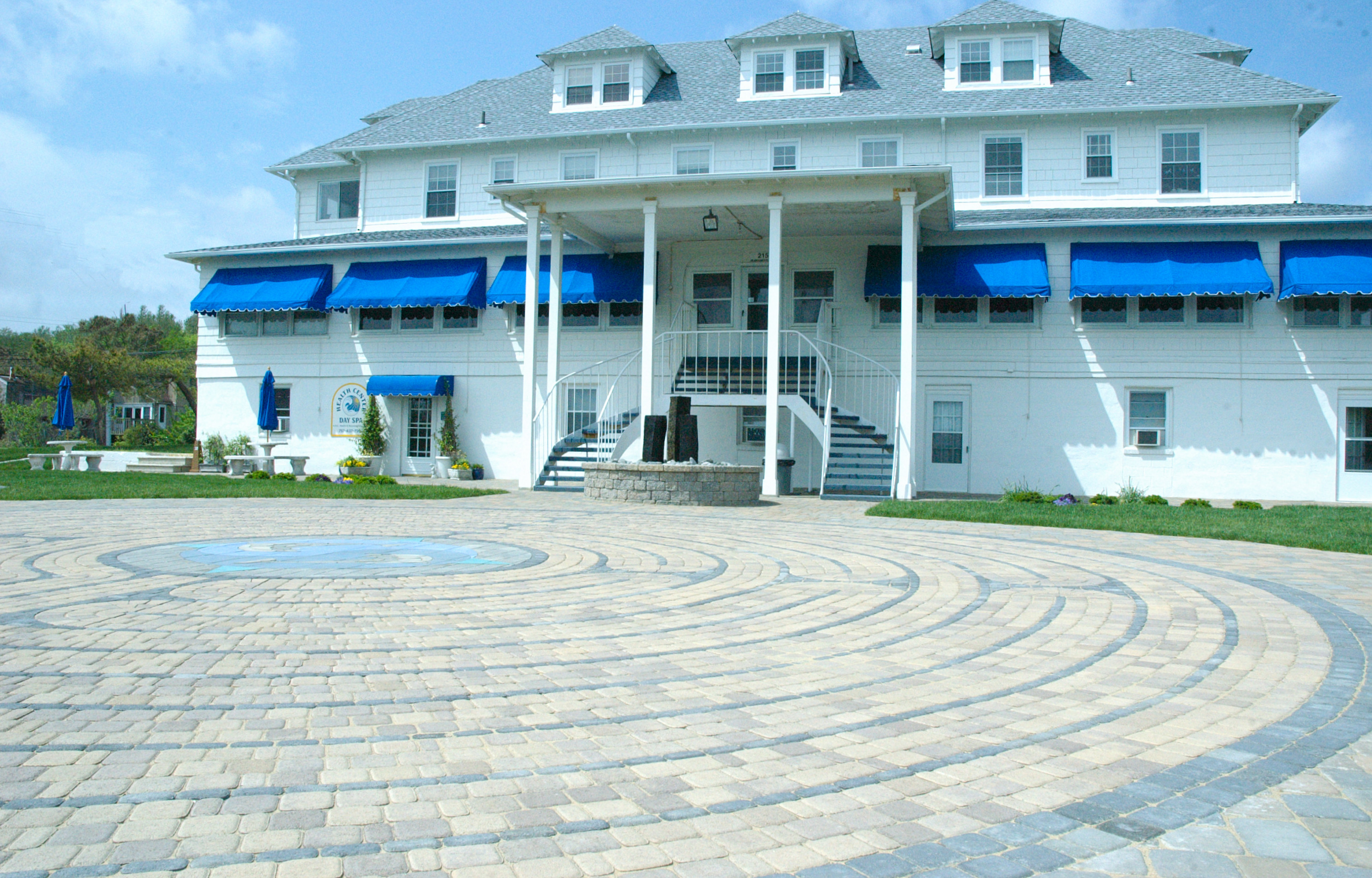
The Historic Cayce Hospital at ARE in Virginia Beach, Va.

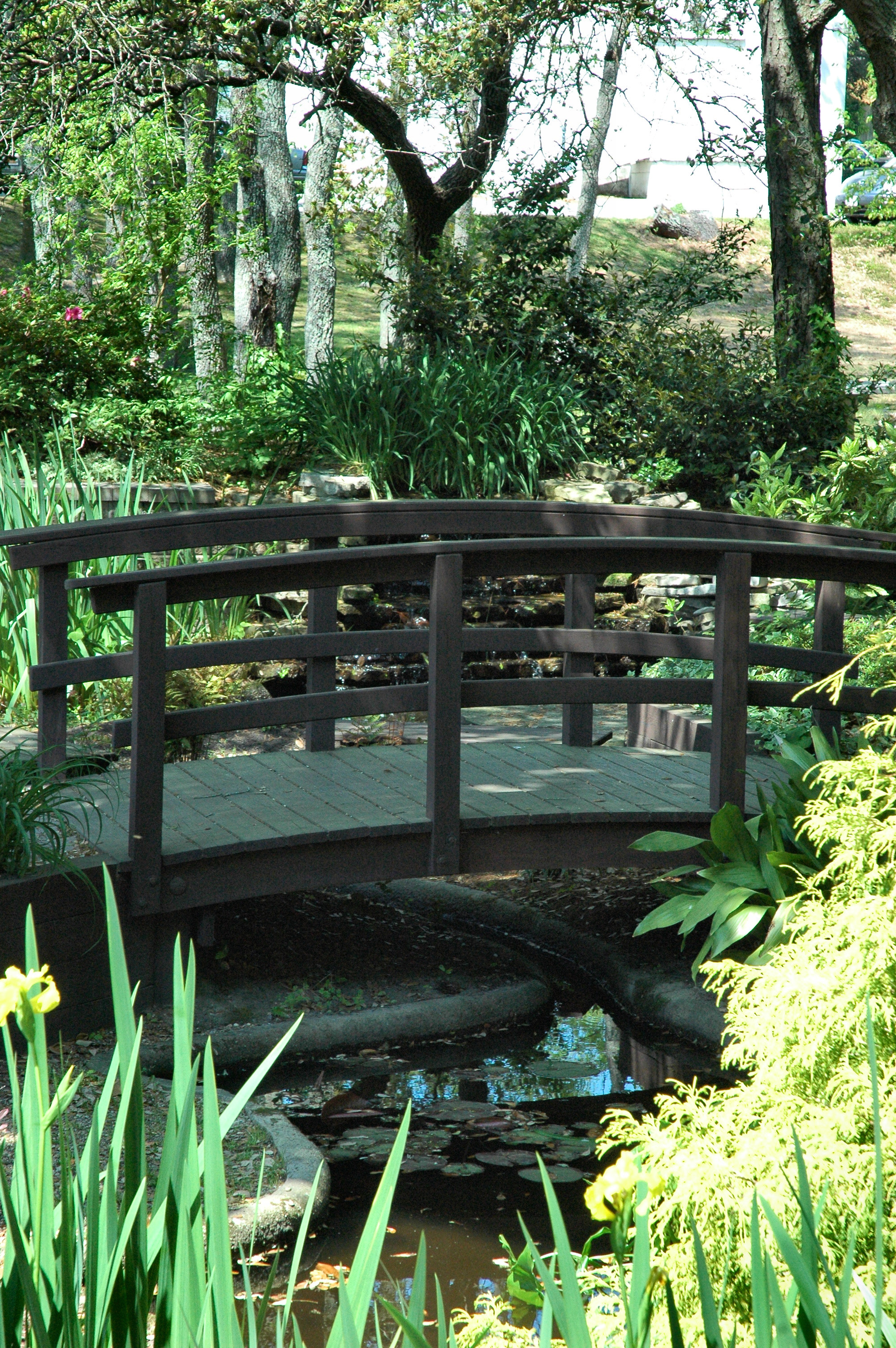
Meditation Garden at Edgar Cayce's ARE in Virginia Beach, Va.

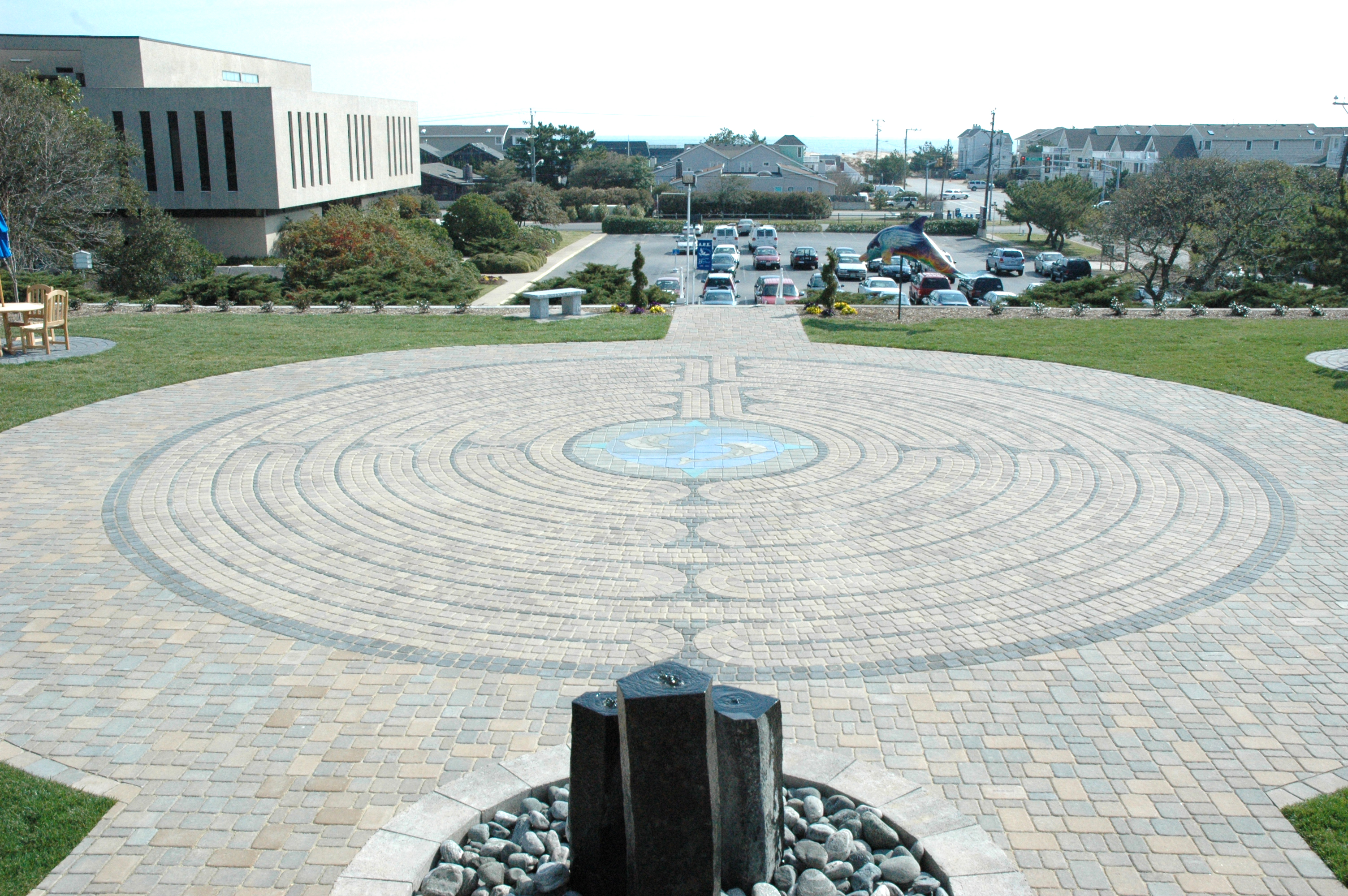
Stone Labyrinth at Edgar Cayce's ARE in Virginia Beach, Va.
