= Strength to Love =

Book by Martin Luther King

- Author: Martin Luther King, Jr
- Publisher: Harper & Row
- Publication date: 1963
- ISBN: 0800614410

Strength to Love is a book by Martin Luther King Jr. It was published in 1963 as a collection of his sermons primarily on the topic of racial segregation in the United States and with a heavy emphasis on permanent religious values.

== Major themes ==
King's writings reflect his deep understanding for the need of agape, a love that is aimed towards ensuring the well-being of others. King believed in a better world, but in order to attain his vision we must first face our fears and then master these fears through courage, love, and faith. He preached of courage that all Christians should show in their nonviolent stand against segregation, he believed that all people could possess this strength and courage for we are all made in the image of God. This courage is the strength to hope for better days, the strength to have faith in the Lord, and most of all the strength to love all of God's children no matter their skin color.

== Sources ==
- The Martin Luther King Jr. Research and Education Institute (8 July 2017). "Strength to Love". Martin Luther King, Jr., Encyclopedia (updated for digital publication). Stanford University.
