= Pit (game) =

Card game

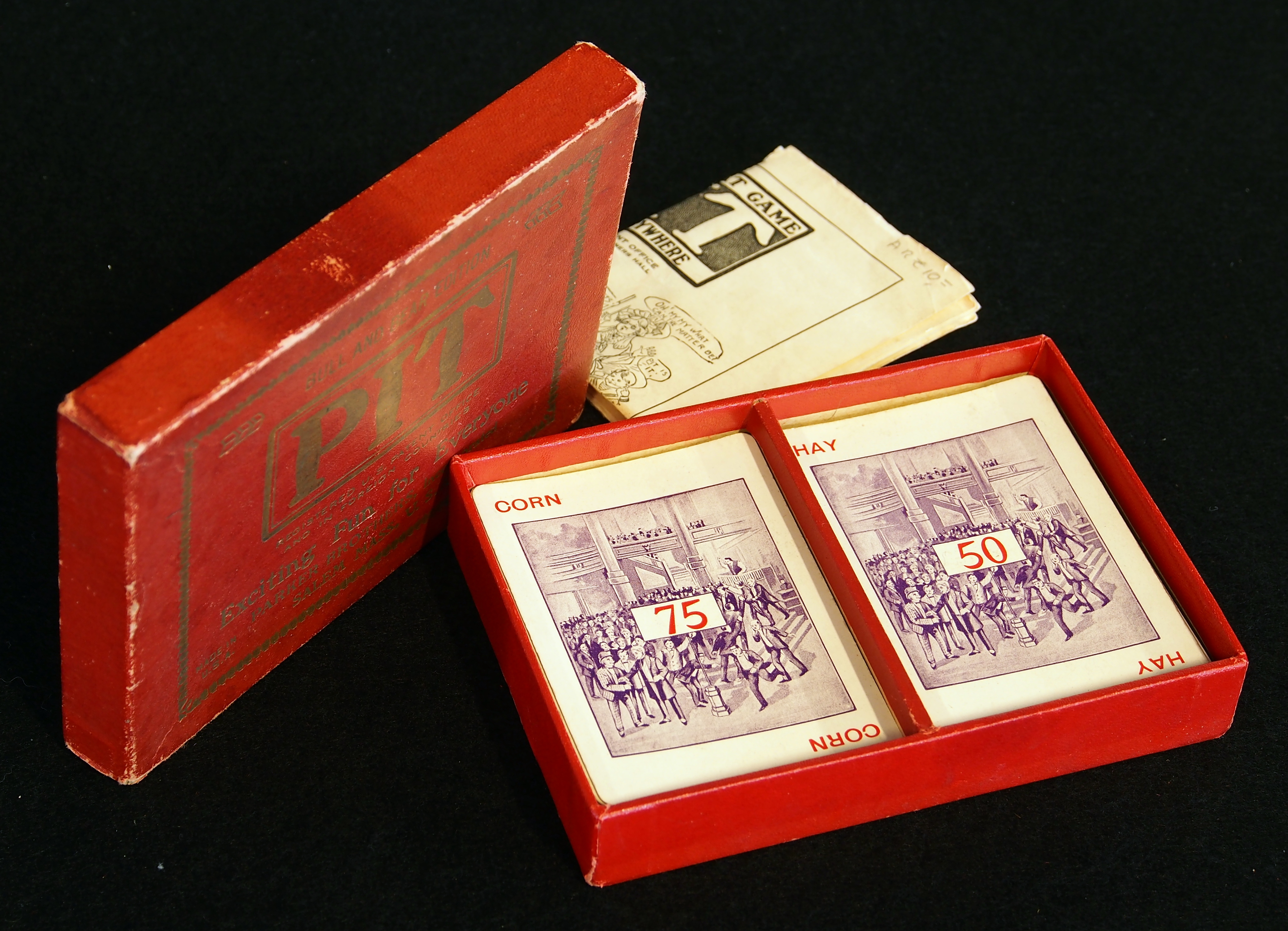
- The box and cards for Pit
- Publishers: Parker Brothers (Hasbro)
- Years active: 1904–present
- Genres: fast paced trading card game
- Players: 3 to 8 players
- Setup time: 1 to 2 minutes
- Playing time: 1 to 10 minutes per round, any number of rounds
- Chance: Dealing cards, blind trades
- Skills: Hand management, Deal making

Pit is a fast-paced card game for three to eight players, designed to simulate open outcry bidding for commodities. The game first went on sale in 1904 by the American games company Parker Brothers.

The inspirations were the Chicago Board of Trade (known as the Pit) and the US Corn Exchange. The game itself was likely based on the very successful game Gavitt's Stock Exchange, invented in 1903 by Harry E. Gavitt of Topeka, Kansas.

While the name Pit remains trademarked in many countries by Hasbro, versions of the game have been marketed under names, including Billionaire, Business, Cambio, Deluxe Pit, Quick 7, Zaster. As early as 1904, the attributed clairvoyant Edgar Cayce claimed he had developed the game and sent it to Parker Brothers.

== Contents ==
Different versions of the game contain different numbers of cards. The original edition has 63 cards, with nine cards each of the seven different commodities. Later editions added an eighth commodity, along with a Bear card and a Bull card, for 74 cards total.

Originally, the commodities and values were the following:

Commodity	Value
Wheat	100
Barley	85
Corn	75
Rye	70
Oats	60
Hay	50
Flax	40

Newer versions include seven or eight commodities, with Flax, Hay and Rye removed from the list of commodities:

Commodity	Value
Wheat	100
Barley	85
Coffee	80
Corn	75
Sugar	65
Oats	60
Soybeans	55
Oranges	50

The 100th anniversary edition, released in 2004, included a reproduction of the original edition as well as a brand new edition that featured 8 "modernized" commodities:

Commodity	Value
Cocoa	100
Platinum	85
Gold	80
Cattle	75
Oil	65
Rice	60
Silver	55
Gas	50

Versions of the game starting in the 1970s contained a bell used to start trading. The first player to hold all nine cards of a commodity would ring the bell.

== Play ==
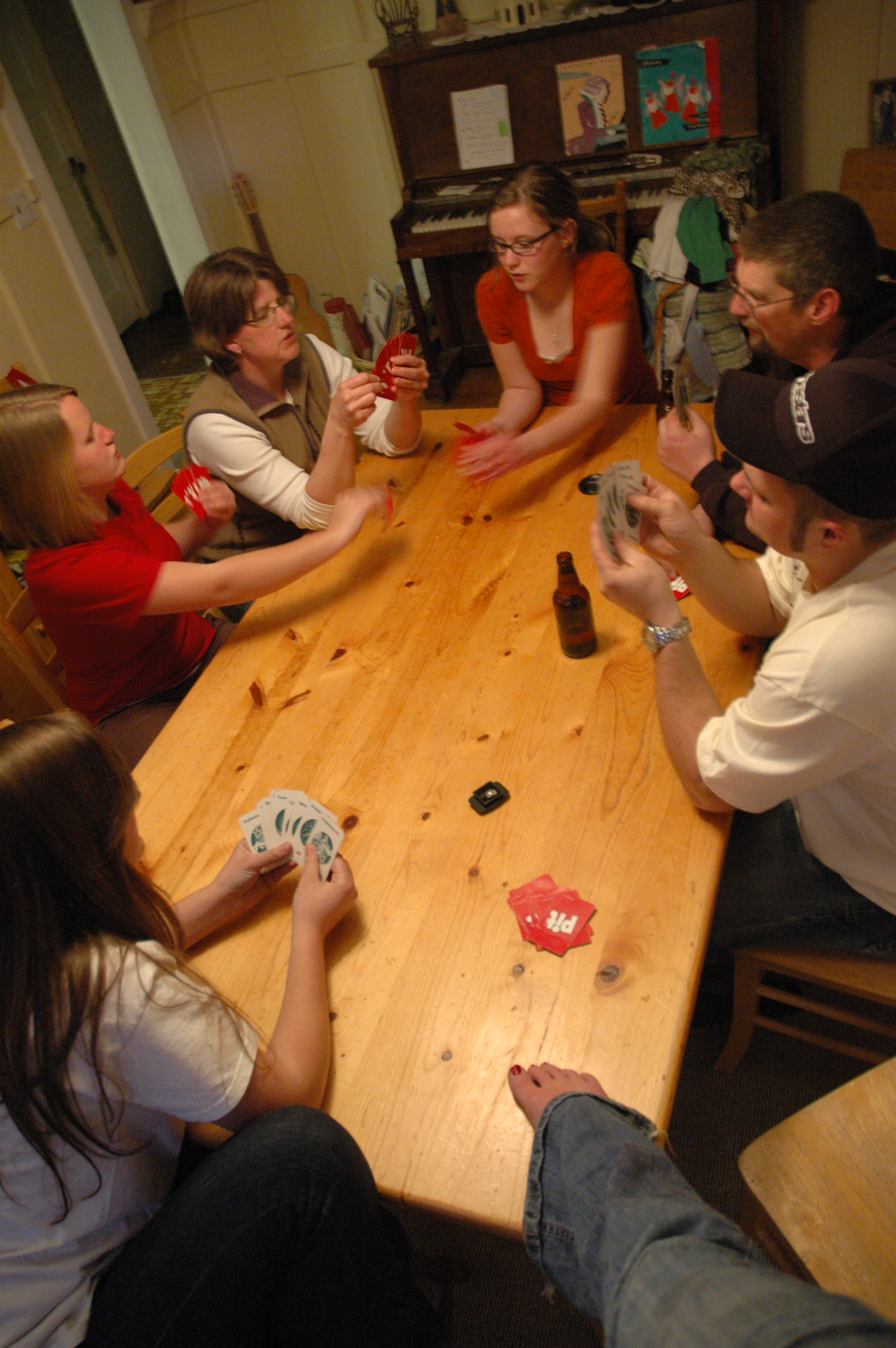
A group of people playing Pit.

The number of commodities included in each round is equal to the number of players. Each player is dealt nine cards; two players get ten if the Bear and the Bull are included in play.

Pit has no turns and everyone plays at once. Players trade commodities among one another by each blindly exchanging one to four cards of the same commodity. The trading process involves calling out the number of cards one wishes to trade until another player holds out an equal number of commodity cards. The two parties then exchange the cards face down.

=== Winning ===
As soon as a player has nine cards of the same commodity in hand, they must reveal their entire hand (e.g., by throwing the cards onto the middle, or the corner board if available) and call out "Corner on (the name of the commodity they are holding)!", ending the round. That player then earns points equal to the number value of the commodity they were holding. In deluxe editions of the game, the player with a full set of nine has to ring the bell before revealing their hand.

The first player to reach an agreed-upon point total wins the game.

=== The Bear and the Bull ===
The Bear card serves as a hazard for all players, as its holder may not declare a Corner even while holding all cards of the same commodity.

The Bull card is considered wild and can be used to complete any set. When it is in play, a player can win a round in any of the following ways:

- Holding all nine cards of the same commodity, as described above, with or without a tenth card of a different commodity in hand
- Holding eight cards of one commodity and the Bull ("Bull Corner")
- Holding all nine cards of the same commodity and the Bull ("Double Bull Corner"), which awards double value

At the end of a round, the Bear and the Bull each impose a 20-point penalty on any non-winning player holding them. It is possible for a player's score to go below zero. The Bull and Bear may be traded individually or with any number of cards of one commodity. However, the four-card limit for a single trade still applies.

== Reviews ==
- Games and Puzzles
- 1980 Games 100 in Games
- Family Games: The 100 Best
