= Gina Cerminara =

American author

- Born: April 11, 1914; Milwaukee
- Died: April 1984
- Education: University of Wisconsin–Madison
- Occupation: Author
- Writing career
- Subjects: Parapsychology, spirituality and reincarnation
- Notable works: Many Mansions, The World Within, Many Lives

Gina Cerminara (April 11, 1914 – April 1984) was an American author in the fields of parapsychology, spirituality and reincarnation. She was born in Milwaukee and received BA, MA, and Ph.D. degrees in psychology from the University of Wisconsin–Madison. Her years of research regarding Edgar Cayce led her to publish a book about reincarnation in 1950 titled Many Mansions. Her other books on reincarnation include The World Within, Many Lives, Many Loves and Insights for the Age of Aquarius.

== Publications ==
- Many Mansions (1950), numerous reprints
- Cerminara, Gina (1957). The World Within. W. Sloane Associates.
- Cerminara, Gina (1972). What I believe. A.R.E Press. p. 48.
- Cerminara, Gina (1976). Insights for the Age of Aquarius. Theosophical Publishing House (A Quest Book). p. 314. ISBN 0-8356-0483-7.
- Cerminara, Gina (1981). Many Lives, Many Loves. DeVorss. ISBN 978-0-87516-429-8.
- Cerminara, Gina (1984). Edgar Cayce revisited and other candid commentaries. Unilaw Library. p. 161. ISBN 978-0-89865-324-3.
- Cerminara, Gina (1988). Many Mansions: The Edgar Cayce Story on Reincarnation. Penguin Group USA. ISBN 978-0-451-16817-7.
- Cerminara, Gina (2006). Many Mansions Part II - Healing the Karma Within You. A. R. E. Press. ISBN 978-0-87604-522-0.
