= Atlantic University =

University in Virginia, United States

Coordinates: 36°53′33.9″N 75°59′24.8″W

- Type: Private university
- Established: 1930; 96 years ago
- Accreditation: DEAC
- President: Kevin J. Todeschi (CEO)
- Faculty: 25
- Administrative staff: 5
- Postgraduates: 116
- Location: Virginia Beach, Virginia, United States
- Campus: Urban
- Website: atlanticuniv.edu

Atlantic University is a private university in Virginia Beach, Virginia. The university is associated with Edgar Cayce's Association for Research and Enlightenment (A.R.E.), and its administrative offices are in the Don and Nancy de Laski Education Center on the main A.R.E. campus. The university is accredited by the Distance Education Accrediting Commission (DEAC) and licensed by the State Council of Higher Education for Virginia (SCHEV).

== History ==
Atlantic University received its charter on April 29, 1930, with a goal of offering a liberal arts education through a holistic perspective. The university closed in 1931, but the charter was kept active. In the fall semester of 1985, Atlantic University reopened as a graduate school with a curriculum that focused on Transpersonal Studies. The first class graduated in 1989.

Initially the Master of Arts in Transpersonal Studies was offered as a residential program with a few independent study distance education options via a correspondence course model. Over the years, the ratio of distance to residential courses changed until the majority of courses were taught as distance education. The method of instruction of distance courses also changed from a correspondence course model to web-based courses to courses on CD. In 2010, the conversion to a truly online school with three semesters began. As the university changed, continuing education and personal enrichment courses were added. In 2017, the university changed from three 14-week semesters to four 12-week semesters allowing for students to complete their program more efficiently. In recent years, the Master of Arts in Transpersonal Studies was changed to Master of Arts in Transpersonal Psychology, thus making the program more accessible and understandable to the outside public. In addition to the Transpersonal psychology degree, Atlantic University offers a Master of Arts in Mindful Leadership, a Graduate Certificate in Regression Hypnosis, a Graduate Certificate in Mindful Leadership, a non-credit certificate in Spiritual Guidance Mentor Training, and Lifelong Learning certificates to adult learners.
