= Stanley Warde Hart =

Stanley Warde Hart (about 1870 – May 23, 1944) was a touring vaudeville performer and later theater manager. He performed under the stage name "Hart the Laugh King". Hart was described as a graduate of the New York Institute of Science, a by-mail institution dedicated to hypnotism and the occult; Hart included stage hypnotism among his acts. Hart was performing as late as 1910.

After touring as the Laugh King, Hart relocated to Los Angeles where he ran theaters including the city's Hyman Theater. In association with the theaters, Hart organized beauty queen pageants. By 1914, he was manager of the Columbia theater. In 1919, he was associated with Quinn's Rialto theater.

Hart received a brief mention in the 1942 biography of American clairvoyant Edgar Cayce who recalled having first been exposed to hypnosis through Hart's stage act. When Stanley Hart died in 1944, his death was covered nationwide via the Associated Press wire service.
