= Ancient Prophecies =

1990's Supernatural TV series

Ancient Prophecies is a series of four TV specials that aired on NBC between 1994 and 1997. Hosted by David McCallum, each special focused on apocalyptic prophecies of doomsday leading up to the year 2000, including interviews and reenactments.

== Ancient Prophecies ==
This special aired on March 1, 1994. Contents include:

- Pyramidology, including the pyramid inch timeline, described by authors E. Raymond Capt and Richard Noone.
- Saint Malachy's Prophecy of the Popes, with author John Hogue.
- Nostradamus’ predictions regarding Napoleon, Hitler, the Challenger disaster and the fall of the Berlin Wall, with author Dolores Cannon.
- Our Lady of Fatima and the Three Secrets of Fatima, with authors Dr. Warren Carroll and Ray Stanford.
- The Garabandal apparitions in northern Spain.
- Prophecies of Edgar Cayce.
- Mary Summer Rain and her relationship with the shaman No-Eyes.
- Earth Changes, with psychic Gordon-Michael Scallion.
- Elizabeth Claire Prophet and the Church Universal and Triumphant.
- Prophecies from the Book of Revelation, with Dr. Charles Strozier, Dr. R. L. Hymers and Reverend H. Richard Hall.
- Ecological collapse including excessive greenhouse gases, famine, drought, loss of the ozone layer, pandemics and rainforest destruction. Includes interviews with Kelly Quirke, Harry Darlington, Dr. Stephen Morse and Dr. Peter Jahrling.

=== Production and reception ===
3 years after airing a recut and updated version of The Man Who Saw Tomorrow, NBC aired the first special in its Ancient Prophecies series. It was produced by Paul Klein's Coast to Coast productions, in association with Greystone Communications. Per the closing credits, the pyramid model in the opening credits was created by The Chiodo Brothers.

Variety described the acting in the special as "generally earnest but subpar." It added "production values are minimal, and the docu is mostly exploitative." It continued, "[The series] turns out to be a routine roundup of everything from biblical verses and Nostradamus to Jeanne Dixon, who has troubling ideas about the future. In fact, just to titillate impressionable viewers, there’s only bad news ahead."

The Washington Post stated, "The network’s department of program standards “wanted to avoid a War of the Worlds’ panic, the spokeswoman said. “We were afraid that viewers might take the show to heart and wanted to provide as much of a context as possible," producing the following disclaimer:

"The following is not a news program or a documentary. The people appearing on camera are not necessarily experts and are expressing personal opinions only. Although significant opposing viewpoints exist, they are not included. The information presented represents unsubstantiated anecdotal accounts of events, interpretations of writings, and speculation about the significance of certain predictions. Some predictions by the same sources, though not mentioned, have been proven inaccurate. Events are dramatized, simulated and re-created."

And finally: "It is not the intention of the broadcasters to suggest that any prophecies are true, and all conclusions about the future, drawn by persons in this program, are purely conjecture".

== Ancient Prophecies II: Countdown to Doomsday ==
This special aired on November 18, 1994. Contents include:

- Various means of divination including crystal gazing, catoptromancy (mirrors) and haruspex (reading entrails) are described by Raymond Moody. Practices of the Bassa people of Cameroon are featured. Dolores Cannon details Nostradamus’ use of mirrors. Individuals relate experiences with a psychomanteum, popularized by Raymond Moody.
- Marian apparitions as described by author Michael H. Brown. Includes Our Lady of Zeitoun, Estela Ruiz, and Our Lady of Kibeho.
- Kabbalah, as described by Rabbi Philip Berg and Rabbi Ariel Bar Tzadok.
- Psychic visions of Paul Solomon.
- Earth Changes with Lori Toye.
- Thomas Banyacya and Hopi prophecies.

=== Production and reception ===
David Bianculli of The Baltimore Sun wrote, "More mumbo-jumbo for morons. I don’t mean to poke fun at anyone’s fervent beliefs, but the insidious, insulting and insipid way in which these “Ancient Prophecies" are described and re-enacted should make disbelievers out of us all."

== New Visions of the Future: Prophecies III ==
This special aired on February 28, 1996. Contents include:

- Astrology as presented by Henry Weingarten, Edward Helin, Thomas Seers and Richard Houck. Houck claimed to have predicted his death by stroke as occurring on September 3, 2031. In reality, he died from cancer on April 1, 2001.
- Bible prophecy, specifically the idea that each Psalm directly correlates to a year in sequence, with each text describing events for that year. Described by J. R. Church and Gary Stearman.
- Marian apparitions through the experiences of Maria Esperanza. Presented by Drew Mariani and Michael Brown.
- Visions of Josyp Terelya.
- H. G. Wells’ future predictions through his fiction, presented by Gary Westfahl and George Slusser.
- The Philadelphia Experiment, with Preston Nichols, Andrew Strom and Al Bielek.
- Earth Changes caused by the Ring of Fire, with Gordon-Michael Scallion and Jon Davidson.
- Near Death Experiences, with testimonials from Cassandra Musgrave, (AKA Martha Cassandra St.Claire) Elane Durham, Jessica Carde and Diane Morrissey.
- The Native American predictions of Jake Swamp and Martin Gashweseoma, with Paul Hutton and Scott Peterson.
- Bavarian seer Matthias Stormberger, presented by John Hogue.
- The occult figure William John Warner, also known as "Cheiro.”

== Prophecies IV: The Final Visions ==
This special aired on September 20, 1996. Contents include:

- Marian apparitions in Santa Maria, California. The trances and visions of Barbara Matthias, presented by Jerrie Castro and author Michael Brown. Warnings from Zdenko "Jim" Singer of Toronto.
- Future prophecies of Jules Verne, as conveyed through his fiction. Detailed by Walter James Miller and screenwriter Gavin Scott.
- Psychic visions of prophet June Gatlin and conversations with author Joyce Noll.
- Eschatology discussions with Peter Lalonde, Gary Stearman, Johanna Michaelsen, Rabbi Ariel Bar-Tzadok and Salem Kirban.
- Survivalism and fallout shelter techniques with Byron Kirkwood.
- Seeress Regina, an early 20th century German prophetess, presented by John Hogue.
- Earth Changes with John "Running Deer" Eleazer.
- Mayan predictions for the year 2012, with Barbara Tedlock.
- Hypnosis and dreams of the future, with Chet B. Snow

=== Production and reception ===
On September 15, 1996, the Los Angeles Times noted it as one of many documentary specials scheduled to air. "The latest installment of this periodic two-hour special explores unexplained visions and occurrences, as well as modern-day prophecies."
