= Dirty Weekend =

A dirty weekend is a weekend during which two people go away together, mainly in order to have sex.

Dirty Weekend may refer to:

- Dirty Weekend (1973 film), a 1973 Italian film
- Dirty Weekend (1993 film), a 1993 British film based on the 1991 novel
- Dirty Weekend (2015 film), a 2015 American film
- Dirty Weekend (novel), a 1991 novel
- The Dirty Weekend, a punk festival in UK
