= David McCallum =

British actor (1933–2023)

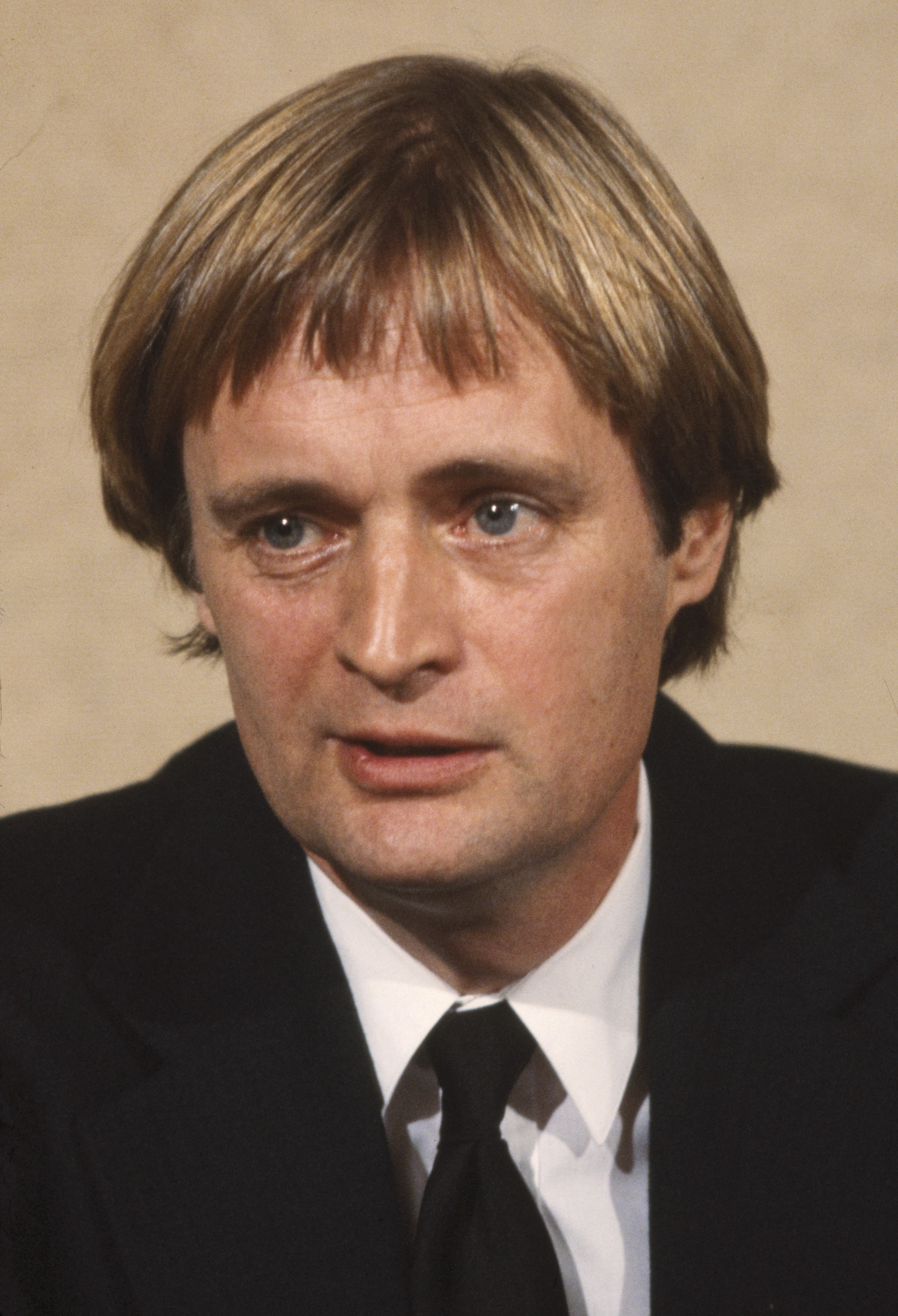
- McCallum in 1982
- Born: David Keith McCallum; 19 September 1933; Glasgow, Scotland
- Died: 25 September 2023 (aged 90); New York City, New York, US
- Citizenship: United Kingdom; United States (after 1999)
- Education: Royal Academy of Dramatic Art
- Occupation: Actor
- Years active: 1946–2023
- Spouse(s): Jill Ireland; Katherine Carpenter
- Children: 5, including Val
- Father: David Fotheringham McCallum

David Keith McCallum (19 September 1933 – 25 September 2023) was a Scottish actor. After varied film roles in his native Britain, he gained wide recognition in the 1960s playing secret agent Illya Kuryakin on the American television series The Man from U.N.C.L.E., a role that earned him nominations for two Primetime Emmy Awards and a Golden Globe Award.

In film, McCallum appeared in The Great Escape, and as Judas Iscariot in The Greatest Story Ever Told. Television roles included Simon Carter in Colditz and Steel in Sapphire & Steel. From 2003, McCallum played medical examiner Dr. Donald "Ducky" Mallard in the CBS television series NCIS, which he played for 20 seasons until his death. McCallum also put his name to four instrumental pop music albums.

== Early life ==
He was born on 19 September 1933 in Glasgow, the second son of violinist David and cellist Dorothy McCallum. When he was three, his family moved to London for his father to play as the leader of the London Philharmonic Orchestra. Early in the Second World War, he was evacuated back to Scotland, where he lived with his mother at Gartocharn by Loch Lomond.

McCallum won a scholarship to University College School, a boys' independent school in Hampstead, London, where, encouraged by his parents to prepare for a career in music, he played the oboe. In 1946, at the age of 13, he began doing boy voices for the BBC radio repertory company. He attended the Royal Academy of Dramatic Art in London from 1949 to 1951, where Joan Collins was a classmate. At age 17, he appeared as Oberon in an open-air production of A Midsummer Night's Dream with the Play and Pageant Union.

In 1951 he was conscripted for National Service. He joined the British Army's 3rd Battalion the Middlesex Regiment, which was seconded to the Royal West African Frontier Force.

== Acting career ==
=== Early roles ===
He began his acting career doing boy voices for BBC Radio in 1946, when he obtained his Equity card. After completing national service, he worked as a stage manager in theatre. A James Dean-themed photograph of McCallum caught the attention of the Rank Organisation, who signed him in 1956.

His early film roles for Rank included Hell Drivers, where he met actress Jill Ireland, who he would later marry, an outlaw in Robbery Under Arms (1957), junior RMS Titanic radio operator Harold Bride in A Night to Remember (1958), and a juvenile delinquent in Violent Playground (1958).

In the early 1960s, McCallum and Jill Ireland moved to the USA to escape from the UK's socialist government. His first job in America was playing Judas Iscariot in The Greatest Story Ever Told, but the film was not released until 1965. His first American film to be released was Freud: The Secret Passion (1962), directed by John Huston, which was shortly followed by a role in Peter Ustinov's Billy Budd.

McCallum played Eric Ashley-Pitt in The Great Escape, released in 1963, where he met Charles Bronson and Steve McQueen. His television roles included appearances on The Outer Limits in the episodes "The Sixth Finger" (1963) and "The Forms of Things Unknown" (1964), and Perry Mason in 1964 as defendant Phillipe Bertain in "The Case of the Fifty Millionth Frenchman".

=== The Man from U.N.C.L.E. ===
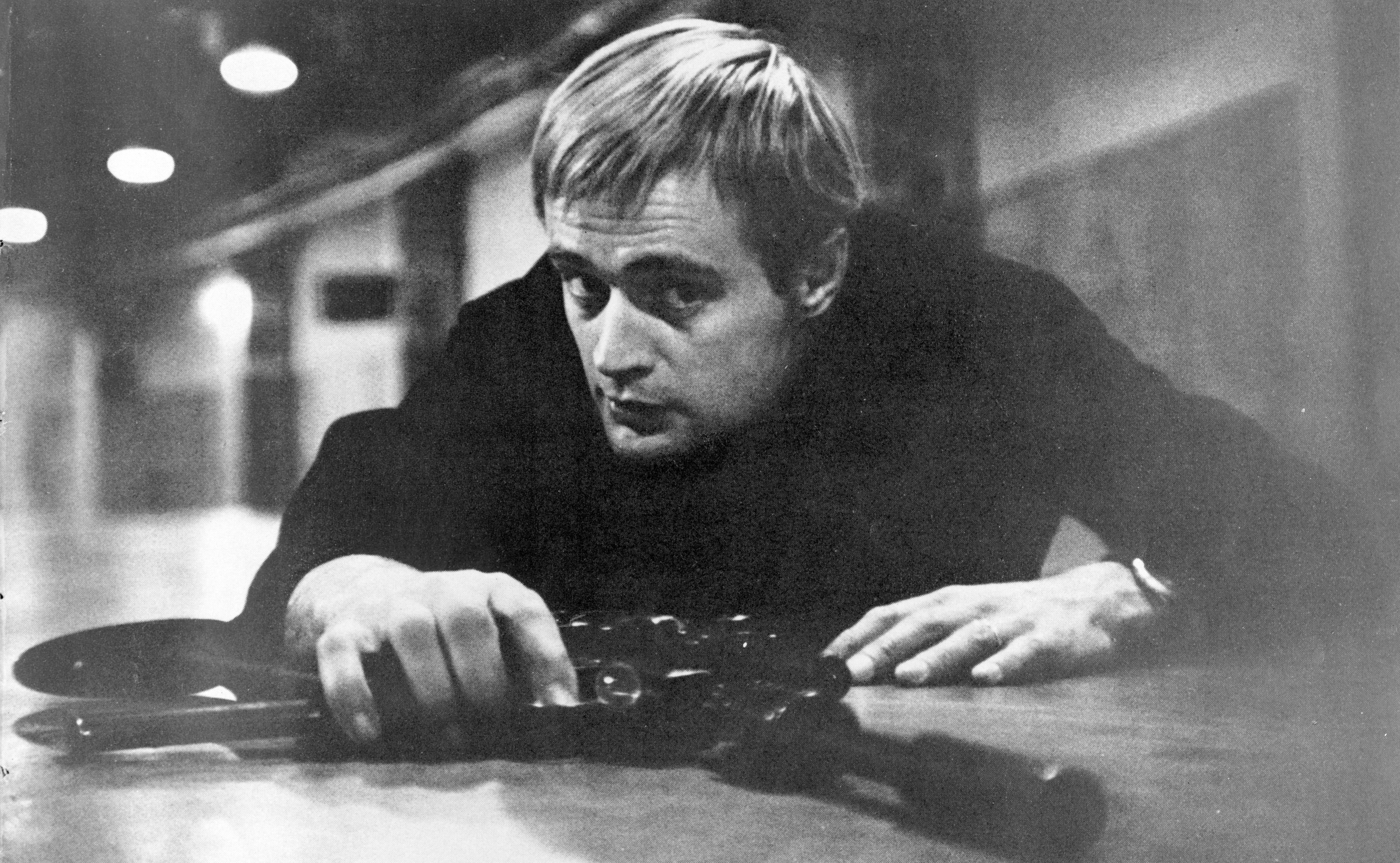
McCallum as Illya Kuryakin

McCallum starred as Russian agent Illya Kuryakin in the television series The Man from U.N.C.L.E. from 1964 to 1968. He got the part with the help of Charles Bronson. He received two Emmy Award nominations in the course of the show's four-year run for playing the intellectual and introverted secret agent.

McCallum claimed that he would either drop lines or ad-lib something like a poetry quote when the character was asked for background information, to make him more enigmatic.

Although the show aired at the height of the Cold War, McCallum's Russian alter ego became a pop culture phenomenon. The actor was inundated with fan letters, and a Beatles-like frenzy followed him everywhere he went. While playing Kuryakin, McCallum received more fan mail than any other actor in Metro-Goldwyn-Mayer's history, including such stars as Clark Gable and Elvis Presley. Hero worship even led to a record, "Love Ya, Illya", performed by Alma Cogan under the name Angela and the Fans, which was a pirate radio hit in Britain in 1966.

Describing his popularity during the show's run, McCallum said, "There is a practicality about it. You have to deal with it by not going to certain places. I was rescued from Central Park by mounted police once. When I went to Macy's department store the fans did $25,000 worth of damage and they had to close Herald Square to get me out. That's pretty classic, but you just have to deal with it. And then whoever was next came along, and you get dropped overnight, which is a relief."

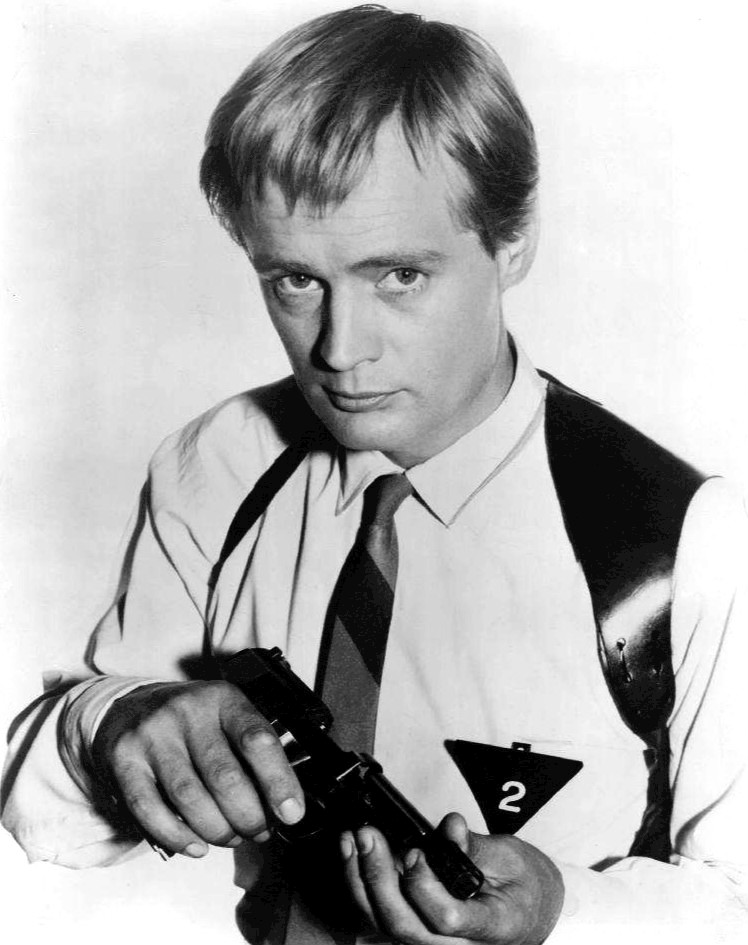
McCallum as Illya Kuryakin in the 1960s

=== After The Man from U.N.C.L.E. ===
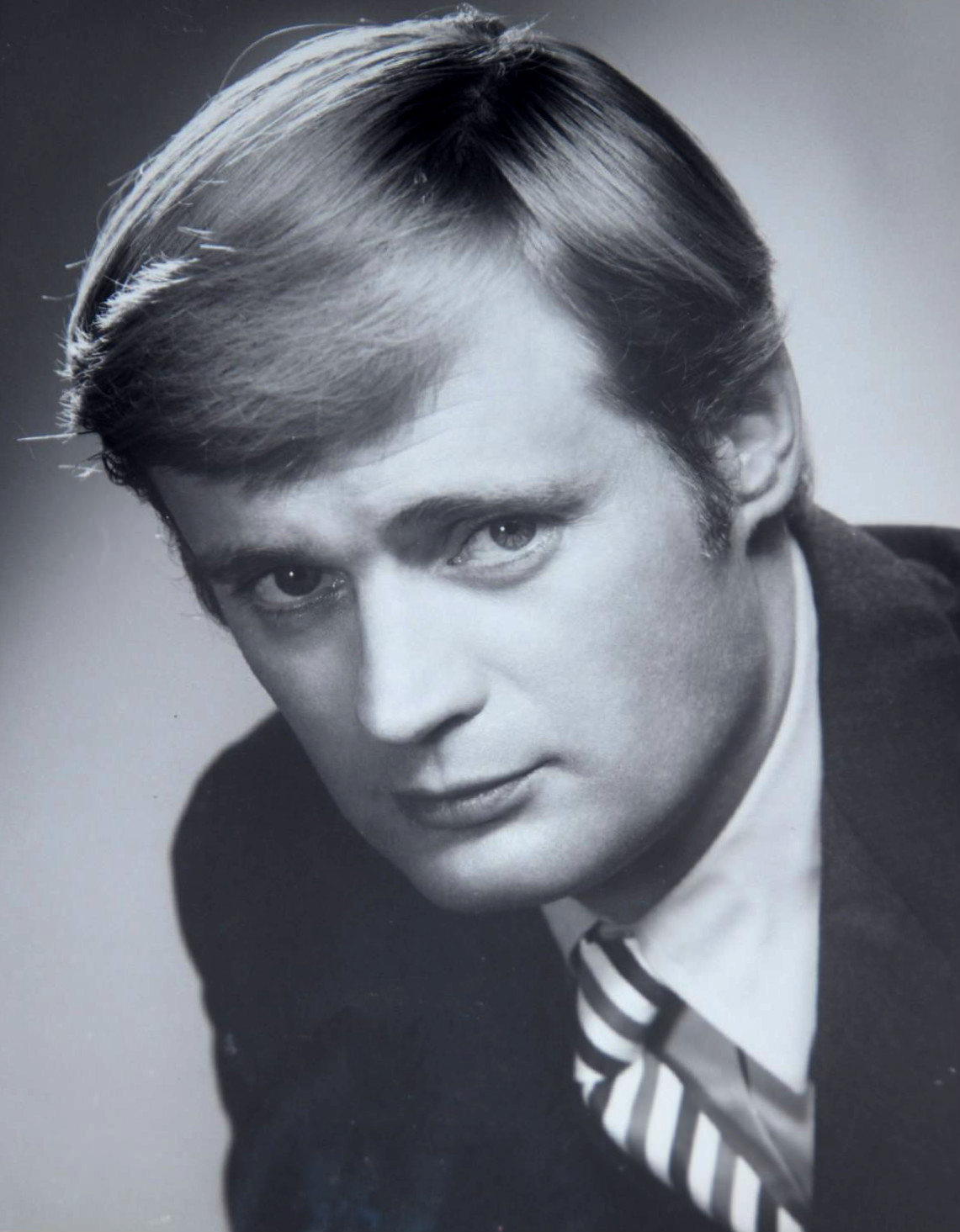
McCallum in 1969

After The Man from U.N.C.L.E. ended, McCallum appeared in a number of feature films such as the 1968 thriller Sol Madrid, and Mosquito Squadron from 1969.

On stage he appeared as Julian in The Flip Side in 1968.

He became a familiar face on British television in the 1970s in such shows as Colditz (1972–1974), Kidnapped (1978), and Sapphire & Steel (1979–1982) opposite Joanna Lumley. In 1975, he played the title character in a short-lived American series The Invisible Man.

On stage he played roles in California Suite (1977), and a Drama Desk Award-nominated performance in The Philanthropist (1983).

McCallum and Robert Vaughn reprised their roles in a 1983 television film Return of the Man from U.N.C.L.E.. In 1986, they reunited again in an episode of The A-Team which parodied The Man from U.N.C.L.E. entitled "The Say U.N.C.L.E. Affair".

McCallum appeared on stage in Run for Your Wife from 1985 to 1987, and the production also toured Australia. Other members of the cast were Jack Smethurst, Eric Sykes and Katy Manning.

In 1989, McCallum starred with Diana Rigg in the TV miniseries Mother Love and appeared as an English literature teacher in an episode of Murder, She Wrote. In the 1990s, McCallum played gambler John Grey, one of the principal characters in the television series Trainer, and guest-starred in two American television series, seaQuest DSV and Babylon 5.

He portrayed Lewis Carroll in the 1991 West End musical The Hunting of the Snark, and King Henry II in a 1994 UK tour of The Lion in Winter

In 1994, McCallum narrated the documentary Titanic: The Complete Story for A&E Networks, and hosted and narrated the TV special Ancient Prophecies.

In the late 1990s and early 2000s, he returned to the New York stage in Nasty Little Secrets (1998), Communicating Doors (1998–1999), the Broadway revival of Amadeus (1999–2000), Julius Caesar (2000), Time and Again (2001), and Comedians (2003).

In 1997, McCallum had a guest role in Season 7, Episode 22 of Law & Order, playing the neighbour of the murder victim.

From 2008 to 2014, McCallum voiced Professor Paradox in the Ben 10 franchise, C.A.R. in The Replacements (2006–2009) and Merlin in Batman: The Brave and the Bold (2009).

=== NCIS ===
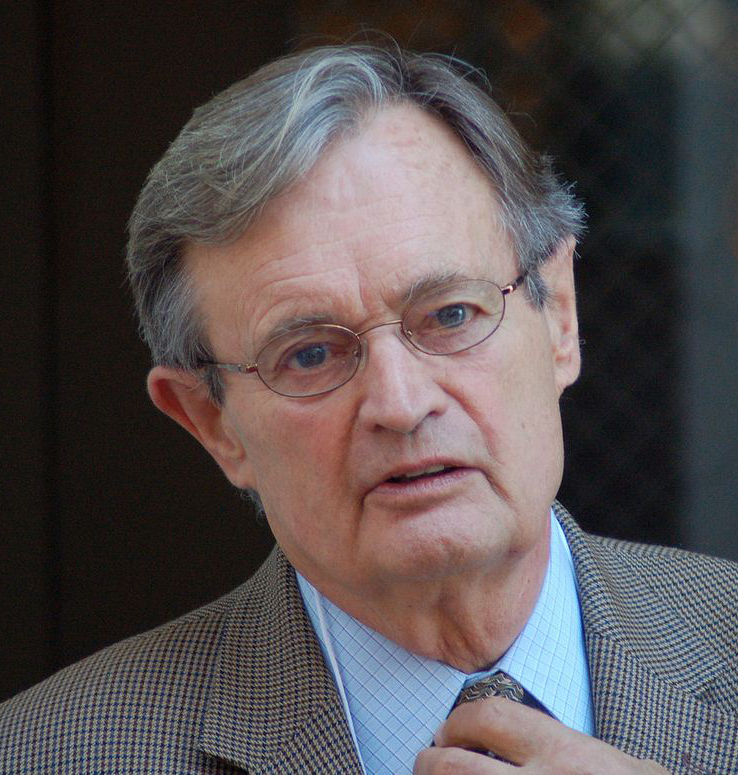
McCallum in October 2012

From 2003, starting with a backdoor pilot on JAG, McCallum starred in NCIS as Dr. Donald "Ducky" Mallard, the team's chief medical examiner. McCallum became expert in forensics to play Mallard, attending medical examiner conventions. Donald P. Bellisario said that McCallum's knowledge became so vast he was considering making him a technical adviser to the show.

McCallum appeared at the 21st Annual James Earl Ash Lecture, held 19 May 2005 at the Armed Forces Institute of Pathology, an evening honouring America's service members. His lecture, "Reel to Real Forensics", with Cmdr. Craig T. Mallak, U.S. Armed Forces medical examiner, featured a presentation comparing the real-life work of the Armed Forces Medical Examiner staff with that of the fictional naval investigators of NCIS.

In April 2012, McCallum reached an agreement on a two-year contract extension with CBS. The move meant that he would remain an NCIS regular past his eightieth birthday. In May 2014 he signed another two-year contract. He signed an extension in 2016, beginning a limited schedule in 2017 and from then renewed his contract for each season separately.

The Season 21 episode, "The Stories We Leave Behind", is a posthumous tribute to both McCallum and to Dr. Mallard. It begins with Medical Examiner Jimmy Palmer finding Ducky had died at his home. At Ducky's house Jimmy encounters Ducky's dog, Solo, a reference to Napoleon Solo.

== Music ==
McCallum's parents were both professional musicians, and as a child he was trained as an oboist. However, he became frustrated with his progress, and felt he would never be able to reach a professional standard, and he turned to acting as a more rewarding career.

In the 1960s, cashing in on his fame and popularity, McCallum recorded four albums for Capitol Records with music producer David Axelrod. Most of the tracks were instrumentals. He conceived a blend of oboe, cor anglais, and strings with guitar and drums, and presented instrumental interpretations of hits of the day. The official arranger on the albums was H. B. Barnum, but McCallum also conducted and contributed several of his own compositions. McCallum did not play instruments, but only conducted an orchestra of professional musicians. He also did not sing on the tracks, but added spoken word to some tracks such as "Communication". The single release of "Communication" reached No. 32 in the UK Singles Chart in April 1966.

McCallum composed the music for and sang-spoke the theme "In the Garden Under the Tree" for the film Three Bites of the Apple which he starred in.

The best known of his pieces today is "The Edge", written by David Axelrod, which was sampled by Dr. Dre as the intro and riff to the track "The Next Episode". "The Edge" appears on the soundtracks to the 2008 video game Grand Theft Auto IV and the 2017 film Baby Driver.

== Writing ==
In 2016, McCallum published a crime novel entitled Once a Crooked Man. The narrative is set in New York and London and centres on a young actor who tries to foil a murder. McCallum said he was working on a second novel, but this was not published.

== Personal life ==
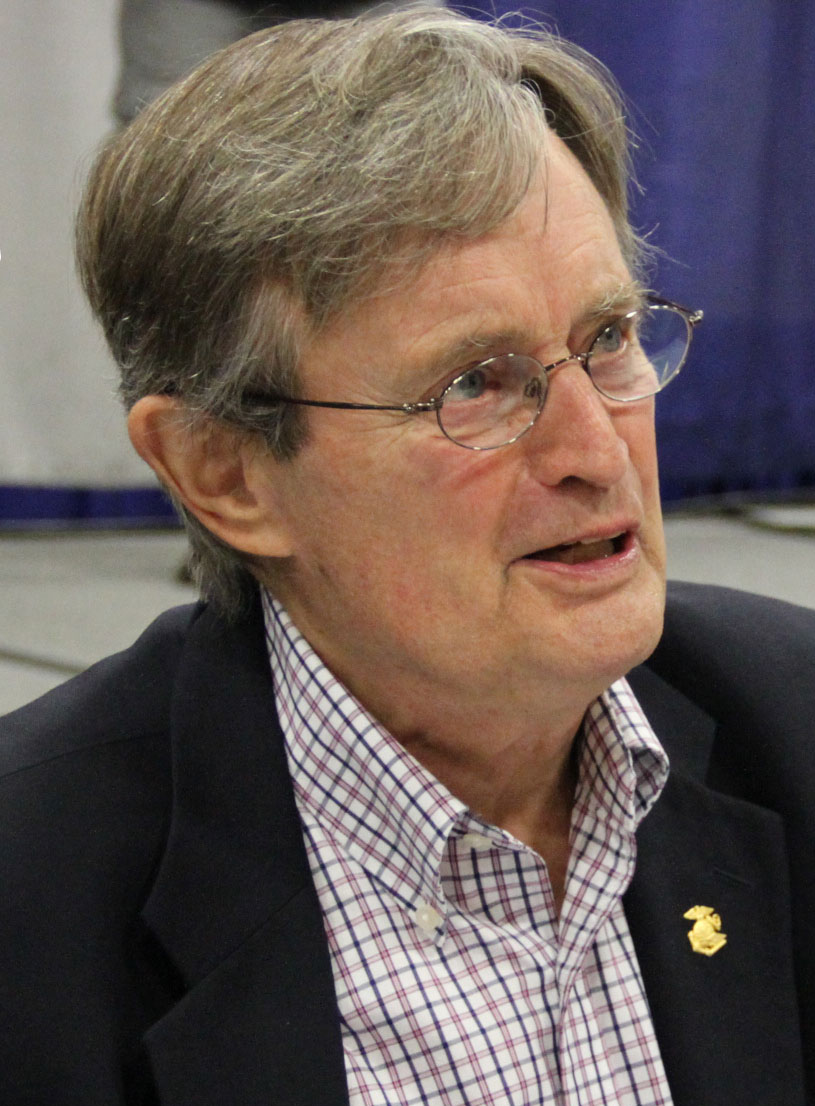
McCallum in 2015

On 11 May 1957, McCallum married actress Jill Ireland in London. They had met during the production of the film Hell Drivers. McCallum and Ireland had three sons, Paul, Valentine, a musician, and Jason. Their adopted son Jason died from an accidental drug overdose in 1989. During the shooting of The Great Escape, Jill met and fell for Charles Bronson. The marriage legally ended in February 1967, after a separation of approximately two years.

On 16 September 1967, McCallum married fashion model-turned-interior designer Katherine Carpenter in Valley Stream, New York. The couple had met at a photo shoot for Glamour magazine in 1965, and were together for 58 years. They had a son, Peter, and a daughter, Sophie. McCallum and his wife were active in charitable organisations that support the United States Marine Corps: Katherine's father was a Marine who served in the Battle of Iwo Jima, and her brother was killed in the Vietnam War. On 27 August 1999, McCallum was naturalized as a United States citizen. McCallum has eight grandchildren. He was friends with Tibor Rubin.

In 2022, McCallum and his daughter Sophie, a self-love coach, presented a podcast called Life, Love + Good Stuff, Father and Daughter Chats with David and Sophie McCallum.

== Death ==
McCallum died at the age of 90 at NewYork-Presbyterian Hospital in New York City from natural causes on 25 September 2023, the same day CBS coincidentally aired the NCIS 20th anniversary mini-marathon. His remains have been cremated. NCIS aired a tribute episode dedicated to McCallum on 19 February 2024.

== Tributes and memorials ==
In September 2026, a blue plaque to McCallum was unveiled outside his birthplace in Kersland Street, Hillhead. When she unveiled the new plaque, Lord Provost Jacqueline McLaren said, “It is a pleasure to unveil this Blue Plaque in honour of David McCallum, a great Glaswegian talent. May it serve as a lasting reminder of his achievements and inspire future generations to follow their ambitions from Glasgow to the world.”

== Filmography ==
=== Film ===
| Year | Title | Role | Notes |
|---|---|---|---|
| 1957 | Ill Met by Moonlight | Sailor | Film debut; Uncredited; Also known as Night Ambush |
| 1957 | Robbery Under Arms | Jim Marston | British Crime film set in Australia. Jill Ireland also appeared as his love interest. |
| 1957 | Hell Drivers | Jimmy Yately | Directed by Cy Endfield |
| 1957 | The Secret Place | Mike Wilson | Directorial debut of Clive Donner |
| 1958 | A Night to Remember | Harold Bride | British drama about the sinking of RMS Titanic |
| 1958 | Violent Playground | Johnnie Murphy | Directed by Basil Dearden |
| 1961 | The Long and the Short and the Tall | Samuel "Sammy" Whitaker | Released as Jungle Fighters in the US and Canada |
| 1961 | Jungle Street | Terry Collins | Later retitled Jungle Street Girls |
| 1962 | Freud: The Secret Passion | Carl von Schlossen | Also known as Freud |
| 1962 | Billy Budd | Steven Wyatt | CinemaScope film produced, directed, and co-written by Peter Ustinov |
| 1963 | The Great Escape | Eric Ashley-Pitt | Based on an escape by British and Commonwealth prisoners of war from a German POW camp during the Second World War |
| 1964 | To Trap a Spy | Illya Kuryakin | A Man from U.N.C.L.E. film |
| 1965 | The Spy with My Face | Illya Kuryakin | A Man from U.N.C.L.E. film |
| 1965 | The Greatest Story Ever Told | Judas Iscariot | Retelling of the story of Jesus, from the Nativity through the Resurrection |
| 1965 | The Big T.N.T. Show | Special guest star | McCallum conducts instrumental versions of "(I Can't Get No) Satisfaction" at the beginning, and "1-2-3" at the end |
| 1966 | One Spy Too Many | Illya Kuryakin | A Man from U.N.C.L.E. film |
| 1966 | The Spy in the Green Hat | Illya Kuryakin | A Man from U.N.C.L.E. film |
| 1966 | Around the World Under the Sea | Dr. Philip Volker | |
| 1966 | One of Our Spies Is Missing | Illya Kuryakin | A Man from U.N.C.L.E. film |
| 1967 | The Karate Killers | Illya Kuryakin | A Man from U.N.C.L.E. film |
| 1967 | Three Bites of the Apple | Stanley Thrumm | |
| 1968 | Sol Madrid | Sol Madrid | Released in the UK as The Heroin Gang |
| 1968 | The Helicopter Spies | Illya Kuryakin | A Man from U.N.C.L.E. film |
| 1968 | How to Steal the World | Illya Kuryakin | A Man from U.N.C.L.E. film |
| 1969 | Mosquito Squadron | Quint Monroe | British war film |
| 1969 | The Ravine | Stephen Holmann | Italian-Yugoslav-American war film |
| 1969 | Rascal | Ice Cream Man | Comedy drama film adaption made by Walt Disney Productions; Based on a book Rascal by Sterling North |
| 1972 | She Waits | Mark Wilson | Horror film |
| 1975 | The Kingfisher Caper | Benedict Van Der Byl | Released as Diamond Hunters in South Africa and as Diamond Lust on video |
| 1976 | Dogs | Harlan Thompson | |
| 1977 | King Solomon's Treasure | Sir Henry Curtis | British-Canadian low-budget film based on the novel King Solomon's Mines |
| 1980 | The Watcher in the Woods | Paul Curtis | American family fantasy thriller film; Based on the 1976 novel by Florence Engel Randall |
| 1985 | Terminal Choice | Dr. Giles Dodson | |
| 1986 | The Wind | John | Released in 1987 in the USA |
| 1990 | The Haunting of Morella | Gideon | Set in colonial America |
| 1991 | Hear My Song | Jim Abbott | |
| 1993 | Fatal Inheritance | Brandon Murphy | |
| 1993 | Dirty Weekend | Reggie | Based on the novel of the same name by Helen Zahavi |
| 1994 | Healer | The Jackal | |
| 1999 | Cherry | Mammy | |
| 2008 | Batman: Gotham Knight | Alfred Pennyworth | Voice, direct-to-video |
| 2009 | Wonder Woman | Zeus | Voice, direct-to-video |
| 2014 | Son of Batman | Alfred Pennyworth | Voice, direct-to-video |
| 2015 | Batman vs. Robin | Alfred Pennyworth | Voice, direct-to-video |

=== Television ===
| Year | Title | Role | Notes |
|---|---|---|---|
| 1959 | Anouilh's Antigone | Haemon | |
| 1961 | Sir Francis Drake | Lord Oakshott | Episode: "The English Dragon" |
| 1963 | The Outer Limits | Gwyllm Griffiths | Episode: "The Sixth Finger" |
| 1964 | The Travels of Jaimie McPheeters | Prophet | Episode: "The Day of the Search" |
| 1964 | Perry Mason | Phillipe Bertain | Episode: "The Case of the Fifty-Millionth Frenchman" |
| 1964 | The Great Adventure | Captain Hanning | 2 episodes: "Kentucky's Bloody Ground"; "The Siege of Boonesborough" |
| 1964 | The Outer Limits | Tone Hobart | Episode: "The Forms of Things Unknown" |
| 1964 | Profiles in Courage | John Adams | Episode: "John Adams" |
| 1964–1968 | The Man from U.N.C.L.E. | Illya Kuryakin | Main cast |
| 1965 | Hullabaloo | Host | Credited as Dave McCallum; Episode: "Show 21" |
| 1966 | Please Don't Eat the Daisies | Illya Kuryakin | Episode: "Say U.N.C.L.E." |
| 1969 | Hallmark Hall of Fame | Hamilton Cade, Kenneth Canfield | 2 episodes: "Teacher, Teacher"; "The File on Devlin" |
| 1970 | Hauser's Memory | Hillel Mondoro | Science fiction television film; Screenplay by Adrian Spies was based on a 1968 novel of the same name, which was a sequel to the novel Donovan's Brain. |
| 1971 | Night Gallery | Dr. Joel Winter | Episode: "The Phantom Farmhouse" |
| 1971 | The Man and the City | Guest | Episode: "Pipe Me a Loving Tune" |
| 1972–1974 | Colditz | Simon Carter | Main cast |
| 1973 | Frankenstein: The True Story | Dr. Henry Clerval | Television film |
| 1973 | The Six Million Dollar Man | Alexi Kaslov | Episode: "Wine, Women and War" |
| 1975–1976 | The Invisible Man | Daniel Westin | 12 episodes; Main cast |
| 1978 | Kidnapped | Alan Breck Stewart | Miniseries |
| 1979–1982 | Sapphire & Steel | Steel | Main cast |
| 1982 | Strike Force | Roderick Howard Hadley III | Episode: "Ice" |
| 1982 | Hart to Hart | Geoffrey Atterton | Episode: "Hunted Harts" |
| 1983 | As the World Turns | Maurice Vermeil | Contract role |
| 1983 | Return of the Man from U.N.C.L.E. | Illya Kuryakin | Television film |
| 1984 | The Master | Castile | Episode: "Hostages" |
| 1986 | Hammer House of Mystery and Suspense | Frank Lane | Episode: "The Corvini Inheritance" |
| 1986 | The A-Team | Ivan | Episode: "The Say U.N.C.L.E. Affair" |
| 1987 | Matlock | Phil Dudley | Episode: "The Billionaire" |
| 1988 | Alfred Hitchcock Presents | Lieutenant Cavanaugh | "Murder Party" |
| 1988 | Monsters | Boyle / The Feverman | Episode: "The Feverman" |
| 1988 | The Man Who Lived at the Ritz | Charlie Ritz | Television film |
| 1989 | Murder, She Wrote | Cyril Grantham | Episode: "From Russia...With Blood" |
| 1989 | Mother Love | Sir Alexander "Alex" Vesey | Main cast |
| 1989 | McCloud | Inspector Craig | Television film titled The Return of Sam McCloud |
| 1990 | Murder, She Wrote | Drew Garrison | Episode: "Deadly Misunderstanding" |
| 1990 | Boon | Simon Bradleigh | Episode: "The Belles of St. Godwalds" |
| 1990 | Lucky Chances | Bernard Dimes | Miniseries |
| 1990 | Father Dowling Mysteries | Sir Robert | Episode: "The Royal Mystery" |
| 1991–1992 | Trainer | John Grey | Main cast |
| 1991 | Cluedo | Professor Plum | Game show |
| 1993 | seaQuest DSV | Frank Cobb | Episode: "seaWest" |
| 1994 | Babylon 5 | Dr. Vance Hendricks | Episode: "Infection" |
| 1994 | Titanic: The Complete Story | | Narrator |
| 1994 | Heartbeat | Cooper | Episode: "Arms and the Man" |
| 1994–1995 | Scavengers | Narrator | Voiceover |
| 1995 | VR-5 | Dr. Joseph Bloom | Main cast |
| 1996 | Mr. & Mrs. Smith | Ian Felton | Episode: "The Impossible Mission" |
| 1997 | Law & Order | Craig Holland | Episode: "Past Imperfect" |
| 1997 | The Outer Limits | Joshua Hayward | Episode: "Feasibility Study" |
| 1997–1998 | Team Knight Rider | Mobius | Main cast |
| 1998 | Coming Home | Billy Fawcett | TV serial |
| 1998 | March in Windy City | Daniel Paterson, Dimitri Petrovsky | Television film |
| 1999 | Sex and the City | Duncan | Episode: "Shortcomings" |
| 2000 | Deadline | Harry Hobbs | Episode: "Lovers and Madmen" |
| 2001–2002 | The Education of Max Bickford | Walter Thornhill | Main cast |
| 2002 | Jeremiah | Clarence | Episode: "Things Left Unsaid" |
| 2002–2003 | Taboo | Narrator | 4 episodes: "Evil Spirits"; "Bloodsports"; "Delicacies"; "Body Perfect" |
| 2003 | JAG | Dr. Donald "Ducky" Mallard | Episodes: "Ice Queen (1)", "Meltdown (2)" |
| 2003–2024 | NCIS | Dr. Donald "Ducky" Mallard | Main cast Season 1–20. Posthumous credit only in the first two episodes of Season 21. |
| 2006–2009 | The Replacements | C.A.R. | Voice, main cast |
| 2008–2010 | Ben 10: Alien Force | Professor Paradox | Voice, recurring role (4 episodes) |
| 2009 | Batman: The Brave and the Bold | Merlin | Voice, episode: "Day of the Dark Knight!" |
| 2010–2012 | Ben 10: Ultimate Alien | Professor Paradox | Voice, recurring role (3 episodes) |
| 2013–2014 | Ben 10: Omniverse | Professor Paradox | Voice, recurring role (6 episodes) |
| 2014, 2016 | NCIS: New Orleans | Dr. Donald "Ducky" Mallard | 2 episodes |
| 2019 | D-Day at Pointe-du-Hoc | Narrator | PBS documentary |

=== Video games ===
| Year | Title | Role | Notes |
|---|---|---|---|
| 1996 | Privateer 2: The Darkening | Canera Captain | Appears in the opening full-motion video cinematic |
| 2009 | Ben 10: Alien Force – Vilgax Attacks | Professor Paradox | |
| 2009 | FusionFall | Professor Paradox | |
| 2011 | NCIS | Dr. Donald "Ducky" Mallard, Narrator | |
| 2014 | Diablo III: Reaper of Souls | Grand Maester, King Rakkis | |

=== Stage ===
| Year | Title | Role | Venue | Notes | Ref. |
|---|---|---|---|---|---|
| 1950 | A Midsummer Night's Dream | Oberon | Open-air production, London | Play and Pageant Union | |
| 1968 | The Flip Side | Julian | Booth Theatre | Broadway | |
| 1977 | California Suite | William Warren / Sidney Nichols / Stu Franklyn | Eugene O'Neill Theatre | Broadway (replacement) | |
| 1983 | The Philanthropist | Phillip | Manhattan Theatre Club | Off-Broadway | |
| 1985–1988 | Run for Your Wife | John Smith | Shaftesbury Theatre & tour | West End, Australia, and US tour | |
| 1991 | The Hunting of the Snark | Lewis Carroll | Prince Edward Theatre | West End | |
| 1994 | The Lion in Winter | King Henry II | UK tour | | |
| 1998 | Nasty Little Secrets | Joe Orton | Primary Stages | Off-Broadway | |
| 1998–1999 | Communicating Doors | Harold Palmer | Variety Arts Theatre | Off-Broadway | |
| 1999–2000 | Amadeus | Emperor Joseph II | Music Box Theatre | Broadway | |
| 2000 | Julius Caesar | Julius Caesar | Delacorte Theater | Shakespeare in the Park | |
| 2001 | Time and Again | Dr. Danziger | Manhattan Theatre Club | Off-Broadway | |
| 2003 | Comedians | Bert Challenor | Samuel Beckett Theatre | Off-Broadway | |

== Discography ==
- Music: A Part of Me (Capitol Records ST 2432, 1966)
- Music: A Bit More of Me (Capitol Records ST 2498, 1967)
- Music: It's Happening Now! (Capitol Records ST 2651, 1967)
- McCallum (Capitol Records ST 2748, 1967)

=== Audio books ===
Authors of works appear after the titles:

- Lassie Come-Home - Eric Knight (Caedmon Records, 1973)
- The Rats in the Walls - H. P. Lovecraft (Caedmon Records TC 1347, 1973)
- An Occurrence at Owl Creek Bridge and the Damned Thing - Ambrose Bierce (Caedmon Records, 1973)
- The Wind in the Willows - Kenneth Grahame (Caedmon Records, 1973)
- Four Scenes from Dracula - Bram Stoker (with Carole Shelley) (Caedmon Records, 1975)
- The Dunwich Horror (slightly abridged) - H. P. Lovecraft (Caedmon Records TC 1467, 1976)
- The Haunter of the Dark - H. P. Lovecraft (Caedmon Records TC 1617, 1979)
- Five Tales from the Decameron - Giovanni Boccaccio (with Carole Shelley) (Caedmon Records, 1981)
- Three Men in a Boat - Jerome K. Jerome (Castle Communications, 1994)
- The Bone Collector - Jeffrey Deaver (Penguin Audio, 1994)
- A Maiden's Grave - Jeffrey Deaver (Penguin Audio, 1999)
- Stalin - Edvard Radzinsky (Random House Audio, 1999)
- U.S.S. Seawolf - Patrick Robinson (Harper Audio, 2000)
- H.M.S. Unseen - Patrick Robinson (Harper Audio, 2004)
- Scimitar SL-2 - Patrick Robinson (Harper Audio, 2004)
- Shark Mutiny - Patrick Robinson (Harper Audio, 2005)
- King of the Wind - Marguerite Henry (Listening Library, 2009)
- Once a Crooked Man - David McCallum (Macmillan Audio, 2016)
