= Blyden Jackson (novelist) =

American writer

- Born: June 2, 1936 New Haven, Connecticut, U.S.
- Died: April 29, 2012 (aged 75–76) Bayonne, New Jersey, United States
- Occupation: Civil rights activist; marine; author; emergency medical technician
- Language: English
- Genre: Urban fiction; African-American literature

Blyden Brown Jackson Jr. (June 2, 1936 – April 29, 2012) was an American civil rights activist, marine, author, and emergency medical technician. He is best known for his novels Operation Burning Candle and Totem. He was born in New Haven, Connecticut and died in Bayonne, New Jersey. During his life he served in the US Marines, where his experiences helped shape the writing of Operation Burning Candle. He served as the chairman of the New Haven, Connecticut chapter of the Congress of Racial Equality (CORE) in the early-to-mid-1960s. He later founded and became the chairman of East River CORE, located on the east side of 125th Street in Harlem, in New York City.

His last novel, For One Day of Freedom, was published posthumously by ANTIBOOKCLUB in December 2021.

== Education ==
Jackson took fiction writing classes at New York University, where he was taught by Sidney Offit.

== Novels ==
- 1973: Operation Burning Candle
- 1975: Totem
- 2021: For One Day of Freedom

== Media appearances ==
- 1974-05-04. "Novelist Blyden Jackson, an SCE writing student, discusses his 1973 novel Operation Burning Candle with host Walter James Miller".
