= David McCallum Sr. =

Scottish musician (1897–1972)

- Born: 26 March 1897; Kilsyth, Stirlingshire, Scotland
- Died: 21 March 1972 (aged 74); Arundel, Sussex, England
- Education: Royal College of Music
- Occupation: Violinist
- Spouse: Dorothy Dorman
- Children: David McCallum; Iain McCallum

David Fotheringham McCallum (26 March 1897 – 21 March 1972) was the Scottish leader (principal first violinist) of the Royal Philharmonic Orchestra, the London Philharmonic Orchestra, and the Scottish National Orchestra. He was also the father of actor David McCallum and of author Iain McCallum.

== Life and career ==
McCallum was born in Kilsyth, Stirlingshire, to a musical family. He studied at the Royal Scottish Academy of Music, Glasgow, and the Royal College of Music, London, where he studied under Maurice Sons, a pupil of Henryk Wieniawski and leader of the Queen's Hall Orchestra. He modelled his violin playing on Fritz Kreisler.

Early in his career, he arranged music for several local silent cinemas. He also played in the cinema trio; and it was here that he met his wife, cellist Dorothy Dorman.

In 1922, he broadcast as a solo violinist for the first time. Between 1932 and 1936, he led the Scottish Orchestra in Glasgow under John Barbirolli, then was asked by Sir Thomas Beecham to lead the London Philharmonic Orchestra in succession to Paul Beard, who had joined the BBC Symphony Orchestra.

During World War II, McCallum led the National Symphony Orchestra and played with the London Studio Players and the BBC's Overseas Music Unit. After the war, McCallum rejoined Beecham, this time as leader of the Royal Philharmonic Orchestra. On the First American Tour of the Royal Philharmonic Orchestra in 1950, Beecham fell ill. McCallum stood in as conductor, and his stint on the conductor's podium earned positive reviews.

He had several small roles in films. His hands are seen playing the violin for Stewart Granger in an uncredited role in The Magic Bow (1946). He played the blind fiddler in the film Last Holiday (1950), which starred Alec Guinness. He also appeared as himself in "Prelude to Fame".

In 1967, McCallum was one of 40 musicians assembled to perform on the Beatles' track "A Day in the Life". From 1961 to 1971, he was leader of Annunzio Mantovani's orchestra. At this time, his son David McCallum Jr. was at the height of his fame, prompting Mantovani to introduce his leader to audiences with the quip, "We can afford the father but not the son!" Indeed, McCallum Sr. played on several tracks arranged and conducted by his son which featured on the Capitol Records LPs Music...A Part of Me and Music...A Bit More of Me released in 1966.

McCallum Sr. died at Arundel in Sussex on 21 March 1972, five days before his 75th birthday.

Guitarist Jimmy Page credits McCallum with giving him the idea of playing his guitar with a violin bow according to MTV's Led Zeppelin rockumentary.
