= Dirty Weekend (1993 film) =

1993 film by Michael Winner

- Theatrical release poster
- Directed by: Michael Winner
- Screenplay by: Michael Winner; Helen Zahavi
- Based on: Dirty Weekend by Helen Zahavi
- Produced by: Robert Earl; Michael Winner
- Starring: Lia Williams; Rufus Sewell; Ian Richardson; David McCallum; Sylvia Syms; Christopher Ryan; Sean Pertwee
- Cinematography: Alan Jones
- Edited by: Michael Winner (as Arnold Crust Jr)
- Music by: David Fanshawe
- Production companies: Scimitar Films; Michael Winner Ltd
- Distributed by: United International Pictures
- Release date: 29 October 1993
- Running time: 102 minutes
- Country: United Kingdom
- Language: English
- Budget: £2.3 million
- Box office: £517,750 (UK)

Dirty Weekend is a 1993 British film directed by Michael Winner and starring Lia Williams, Rufus Sewell, Ian Richardson and David McCallum. It was written by Winner based on the 1991 novel of the same title by Helen Zahavi.

Bella, a secretary, becomes a victim of Tim, a voyeur who harasses her. After the police provide no assistance, Bella consults an Iranian clairvoyant, Nimrod, who encourages her to take matters into her own hands. She kills Tim and goes on a murder spree, ultimately evading capture.

== Synopsis ==
Bella finds her academic boyfriend is cheating on her with multiple students. She decides to move to Brighton, and get a job working from home in a basement flat. Soon, she finds herself the victim of Tim, a voyeur who watches her through her windows and plagues her with obscene phone calls in which he threatens to assault and rape her, and kill her if she contacts the police. Her friends introduce her to a policeman, Podgy, who offers to help but then sexually assaults and belittles her. Bella chances upon Nimrod, an Iranian clairvoyant who suggests that she take matters into her own hands, and gives her a switchknife.

That night, Bella breaks into Tim's flat while he is sleeping and batters him to death with a hammer. Bella realises she is excited by killing. She tries to buy a gun in a gun shop but is refused, and buys a black market revolver.

Next Bella goes out dressed as a prostitute and picks up Norman, a university lecturer, and goes back to his hotel room, where she suffocates him after having sex. Having tooth pain, she visits a dentist, Freddie, who, after treating her, offers a lift, but then locks her in his car and forces her to perform oral sex. She steals his car as he is urinating, and runs him over, killing him.

After being accosted in an alley by three men, she shoots them all dead with her revolver. After tossing the revolver in the sea, she is attacked by a serial killer in an empty amusement arcade, but she butchers him with the switchblade she got from Nimrod. Ultimately, she evades capture by the authorities and prepares to carry on her murderous rampage in the large, faceless city of London.

== Cast ==
- Lia Williams as Bella
- Rufus Sewell as Tim
- Michael Cule as Norman
- David McCallum as Reggie
- Christopher Ryan as Small One
- Sean Pertwee as Quiet One
- Nicholas Hewetson as Bitter One
- Christopher Adamson as serial killer
- Jack Galloway as David
- Matthew Marsh as William Bascombe ("Podgy")
- Ian Richardson as Nimrod
- Shaughan Seymour as Charles
- Mark Burns as Mr Brown
- David Schaal as Stan
- Matthew Long as gun shop assistant
- Norman Mitchell as repair man
- R.J. Bell as man on train
- Andrew Neil as newsreader
- Neil Norman as party man
- Miriam Kelly as Marion
- Sylvia Syms as Mrs Crosby
- Lorraine Doyle as Secretary
- Simone Hyams as party girl
- Ruby Milton as Mary

== Production ==
Filming took place in the Notting Hill and Kensington areas of London and also in Brighton. The Internet Movie Database lists other locations. The gun shop scenes were filmed at Park Street Guns near St Albans; the country pub (now demolished) was the Grenville Lodge, East Burnham (Burnham Beeches), Buckinghamshire; and the dentist scenes were shot at a real dental practice in Twickenham, Greater London.

Theft of equipment was a problem during filming. While filming in Brighton, all the catering equipment was stolen and in Notting Hill Gate, a mobile kitchen with generator was stolen.

During the filming, Michael Winner accosted passers-by as extras.

== Reception ==
Halliwell's Film Guide described Dirty Weekend as "a sleazy little tale of a female vigilante, directed and acted in a perfunctory, over-emphatic manner".

In The Independent Sheila Johnston wrote: "no window-dressing can hide the fact that an aura of indelible naffness hangs over the movie ... the screenplay is hewn out from Helen Zahavi's over-written novel with no concessions to the way people actually speak". Johnston argued Dirty Weekend was inferior to other female revenge films such as Ms. 45 and Lipstick, and criticised the making up of the white actor Richardson with "brownface" to portray a Middle Easterner.

The Observer review said Dirty Weekend has "a certain factitious topicality", but went on to state "a work so bad in every way, and mostly risibly so, cannot be the focus of serious controversy".

Brian Case, reviewing the film for Time Out, dismissed Dirty Weekend as "pretty rotten", and criticised Winner's direction, stating it resembled "out-takes from local cinema advertising, which distances the audience from the material and indeed from wakefulness itself".

In Variety, Derek Elley wrote: "Michael Winner aims low and half-misses with Dirty Weekend ... Winner plays up the unreality with off-center framing and careful use of lenses, recalling Polanski’s efforts to give a heightened, jet-lag feel to Frantic, although flat lighting and grubby color give the whole thing a bargain-basement look."

Ian Nathan in Empire gave the film 1/5 stars, writing: "Justly vilified on release as a piece of asinine exploitation trumped up as a feminist tract, this is an ugly movie indeed."
