= Operation Burning Candle =

Novel by Blyden Jackson

- First edition
- Author: Blyden Jackson
- Language: English
- Genre: Political Thriller
- Publisher: The Third Press/Joseph Okpaku Publ. Co.
- Publication date: 28 January 1973
- Publication place: United States
- Pages: 253
- ISBN: 0515034894
- Followed by: Totem

Operation Burning Candle is a novel by Blyden Jackson published in 1973. It was his debut novel. It describes a political conspiracy led by a group called the Black Warriors, whose leader is Vietnam War veteran and Harlem native Captain Aaron Rogers. The conspiracy does not appear clear until more than halfway through the novel and refers to a traumatic event to galvanize the black community in the US to take control of their own destiny. The novel culminates with a series of killings at a political convention held at Madison Square Garden in New York City.

== Title ==
The title of the book refers to the three part plan initiated by the Black Warriors. No matter where they go, they will be welcomed in to the homes of members of the black community who burn candles in their home as a sign of solidarity and refuge.

== Plot summary ==
The novel begins with the death of Harlem native and Vietnam War veteran Captain Aaron Rogers. He has supposedly been killed in Vietnam and his body has been flown back to the US for burial. Suspicion is created when Rogers' sister Sissy (Janice) claims to have seen Aaron in a car in lower Manhattan. She and her brother Tommy go to the funeral parlor where the body of Aaron is in a coffin. They discover that the body is not of their brother at all, but someone else entirely.

While Sissy and Tommy are discovering the truth about their brother, Police detective Dan Roberts, former Korean War veteran and current law school student as well as member of the NYPD's Special Operations Unit is investigating a series of seemingly unrelated yet unusual crimes, including a number of bank robberies and a subway malfunction and shutdown.

Meanwhile, firebrand governor of Mississippi Josiah Brace is getting ready for the Democratic National Convention scheduled to occur in just a few days in Madison Square Garden. Brace is a divisive figure who is opposed to the Civil Rights reforms of the 1960s as well as school busing. He is ambitious and hopes to be nominated as his party's presidential candidate at the convention.

At this point, there are flashbacks to the Vietnam War from Aaron Rogers' point of view. We see the racism prevalent during the war from white officers against black regulars. It was not uncommon for black soldiers to engage in "fracking" against their white superiors. There are additional flashbacks to Rogers' time as a student in graduate school where he studied psychology at New York University. He is the only black student in his class and he feels isolated and ostracized by the rest of the class. He is intrigued by Carl Jung's theory of the collective unconsciousness which he hopes to apply to his study of the black community. He comes to the realization that the only thing that can transform the black community's standing in the United States is a monumental traumatic event that will alter the predominant white community's power dynamic.

Ultimately, using well trained black Vietnam War soldiers, Aaron Rogers formulates a plan that will culminate in a monumental event of political violence that will transform American society.

== Characters ==
- Aaron Rogers – Former CUNY graduate and NYU psychology student. Active in the Civil Rights struggle of the 1960s. Former Captain in the Vietnam War. Leader of the Black Warriors (based on the Black Panthers and other radical groups of the 1960s and 1970s).
- Janice (Sissy) Rogers – Sister of Aaron, former Black Panther.
- Mama Rogers - Mother of Aaron and Janice together with 10 other children.
- Pa Rodgers - Father of Aaron and Janice, married to Mama Rogers. Former WWI Veteran. Perpetually drunk. One of Aaron's mentors.
- Tommy Rogers - Brother of Aaron, sister of Janice.
- Johnny Boy - Member of the Black Warriors.
- Hank - Born Rodger Henry Smith, Member of the Black Warriors.
- Larry - Member of the Black Warriors.
- Andy - Member of the Black Warriors.
- Mississippi Governor Josiah Brace - Firebrand politician who is opposed to Civil Rights. Running for Democratic nominee for president. (Based on Alabama Governor George Wallace).
- John Clinton - Brace's campaign manager.
- Craig - A liberal politician running for president.
- Dan Roberts - Korean War Veteran, law school student, NYPD detective, member of the Special Operations Unit.
- Laurie Roberts - Dan's wife.
- Frank Richardson - Master Sergeant from Biloxi, Mississippi. One of Aaron's confidants during the Vietnam War.
- Professor Bendel Houghton - Aaron's professor at NYU.
- Annie Cole - Graduate student at NYU, political radical.
- Elaine Cooper - Black student radical, former lover of Aaron.

== Main themes ==
The novel which was written during the late 1960s and early 1970s reflects many of the themes prevalent in US society during the time period. Written in the aftermath of the civil rights movement, urban riots, the Vietnam War, the political assassinations of John F. Kennedy, Malcolm X, Martin Luther King Jr. and Robert F. Kennedy, it reflects the political paranoia of the period. At the same time the novel is a call to black unity and cooperation in order to transform the political power structure. Many of the novel's themes were addressed in films of the period including Uptight and The Spook Who Sat By the Door. Its treatment of the black soldier's experience during the Vietnam War is reflected in Spike Lee's Da 5 Bloods.

== General references ==
- Poetry, Fiction, and Drama - Fiction
- Book Reviews, Sites, Romance, Fantasy, Fiction
- Violence on a Southern farm and in New York City (Published 1974)
- Blyden Jackson | WNYC | New York Public Radio, Podcasts, Live Streaming Radio, News
