= Estela Ruiz =

American Marian visionary

Estela Ruiz (born April 8, 1936) is an alleged Marian visionary in Phoenix, Arizona.

== Early life ==
Ruiz grew up in Lordsburg, New Mexico, the daughter of Manuel Ruiz and Delfina Aguilera who are from Mexico. Her father was a sometimes-unemployed alcoholic, and her mother's business supported the household. Her father verbally and emotionally abused her mother, who in turn occasionally vented her frustration on the family, who relied on her for their support. When Ruiz was sixteen, her mother made a promesa to Virgin of Guadalupe that if her eldest son Inocensio, Ruiz's older brother, survived his illness, she would scale Mount Cristo Rey in pilgrimage. Inocensio recovered and Aguilera took Ruiz along on this climb, where Ruiz felt a "mysterious force" lifting her up the mountain despite her fatigue. Though the family was Catholic before, following Inocensio's recovery the household devotion to the Church and to the Virgin of Guadalupe grew even stronger. While in her thirties, her mother developed and recovered from endometrial cancer, which she interpreted as her "cross to bear". The anthropologist Kristy Nabhan-Warren views Delfina Aguilera's "physical and marital suffering" as an enactment "in her own relationship with Jesus and the Virgin of Guadalupe." The relationship between suffering and religion had a profound impact on Ruiz's understanding of life. A car accident twenty-five years later that led to her father's recovery from alcoholism allowed him to have a better relationship with her mother and to be a loving grandfather to Ruiz's children.

== Pre-apparition ==
Estela married Reyes Ruiz, a man who had been a devotee of the Virgin of Guadalupe since the age of seven. The two had six children, four of whom graduated from institutes of higher education. One of their sons, Armando Ruiz, became a representative in the Arizona House of Representatives and later in the Arizona State Senate. After her children had all grown, she decided to return to school and focus on her career. She earned a Bachelor's degree in education from Ottawa University in Phoenix, and enrolled in a Master's of Education program at Northern Arizona University. In the early 1970s, she was hired to work for the Murphy School District in Phoenix and worked her way up the bureaucratic ladder to become superintendent of the district's bilingual programs.

When her mother later began suffering as a result of the radiation therapy, Ruiz drove daily from her Phoenix workplace to the hospital in Lordsburg. She developed the same symptoms as her mother, whose death made Ruiz feel that she was going to die also. While she didn't die, she realized how dependent she had been on her mother. She became determined to succeed in her career and started attending assertiveness-training courses offered at the hospital. The courses helped her to increase her self-esteem, set goals, separate herself from her mother, and feel like she was in control of her life. According to Ruiz, this sense of control was illusory: "I didn't realize that it was God who was in control, I actually thought I was the one in control, can you believe it?!"

Meanwhile, her husband Reyes, who had long been involved in many Catholic activities, including the encuentro movement of Spanish-speaking Catholics in the United States, the Catholic farmworkers rights campaigns, and prison ministries, forged ties with Father Jack Spaulding of St. Maria Goretti Church in Scottsdale and his group of nine young Marian visionaries. In 1988, he accompanied Father Spaulding to Medjugorje, Bosnia and Herzegovina, where the Virgin Mary appeared to six youths beginning in 1981. While in Medjugorje, Reyes prayed that his wife would help lead the family down a more spiritual path.

Despite her religious upbringing, Ruiz describes herself at the time as a skeptic and a "Sunday morning Catholic". A successful, sophisticated woman, Ruiz was embarrassed by Reyes' religiosity and was jealous of his affection for the dark-skinned Virgin. While her husband was gone, Ruiz almost took down the icon of the Virgin of Guadalupe (painted by Reyes) that hung in their home. She decided to leave it up, however, and the next day as she walked past the painting, she heard it wish her a good morning. She dismissed the greeting as a figment of her imagination or a signal of mental instability. The next week, the painting greeted her again, and Ruiz felt a sensation that the voice was coming from the Virgin Mary. Following the two auditory experiences, Ruiz began waking up early with a strong desire to attend six o'clock mass. By the time Reyes returned, he found his wife much more open to his spirituality, and when he asked for her help to spiritually revitalize the family, she agreed.

Shortly thereafter, Ruiz had two dreams of the Virgin of Guadalupe. Ruiz later interpreted these dreams as preparation for her first vision.

== First apparition ==
On the night of December 3, 1988, Ruiz, Reyes, their son Fernando, and Fernando's wife Leticia, who was pregnant with their fourth child, were all praying the Rosary. Ruiz in particular was praying for her son Reyes Jr., who was struggling with cocaine addiction and for Fernando and Leticia's marriage. During the final decade, Ruiz says she saw a light emanating from a portrait of the Immaculate Heart of Mary that grew brighter until it forced her to close her eyes. At that moment, the Virgin spoke to her: "Don't you know that I am going to take care of your children?" Ruiz was overcome with emotion and began to cry, calling out, "Qué linda! Qué linda!" ("She's beautiful! She's beautiful!").

== Post-apparition ==
For the next ten years, Ruiz claimed that the Virgin appeared to at least weekly, and often daily. She identified herself as Our Lady of the Americas and relayed messages to the Ruiz family, the people of the barrio, and to greater community of "the Americas" via Ruiz, sometimes speaking in English and sometimes in Spanish. The majority of the messages focus on the necessity of prayer, especially of the rosary, and on the need to evangelize and "fight Satan" in order to make the world a better place. Some have interpreted the demand to improve the world as necessary prepare the world for the second coming of Jesus Christ. She also demanded a shrine, which the family built in their back yard during the next year. The shrine includes of a painting of the Virgin of Guadalupe, a painting of Our Lady of the Americas by Reyes, and a life-sized wooden crucifix, also by Reyes.

Ruiz wanted to drop out of school and immediately dedicate herself to the Virgin's work. Instead, she claims the Virgin counseled her to finish her program. She and her family spent the rest of the year "working on themselves", spiritually preparing themselves to go public with the messages. When they did, the Phoenix diocese investigated their claims and ultimately neither sanctioned nor disavowed them.

== Mary's Ministries, ECDC, and NFL-YET ==
The Ruiz family began their evangelism through the creation of Mary's Ministries, a lay Catholic organization that runs leadership faith camps, and proselytizes. Mary's Ministries has branches in Linares Chile; Sullana, and Lima, Peru; Cuenca, Ecuador; Hirador, Southern Colombia, Franca, Brazil; Hermosillo, Sonora, Mexico and in the Mexican states of Coahuila and Durango. The desire for spiritual improvement led to a will to better the lives of people "in the world", which spawned several organizations. The ESPIRITU Community Development Corporation (ECDC), an outgrowth of Mary's Ministries, is a community development association designed to alleviate the suffering that results from the poverty of the barrio. The ECDC helps finance the development of low-income housing and lobbies for commercial development in the South Phoenix area, but its main function is to develop international, principle-based, servant leaders, which is in part accomplished by running the NFL Youth Education Town (NFL-YET), one of Arizona's first and largest charter schools, and its satellite campus in Safford. In Africa, Mary's Ministries has a missionary (Mary house) in Uganda, in East Africa, with 5 missionaries carrying forward Mary's Ministries' mission.

The NFL-YET, formerly called Esperanza Montessori Academy, was enlarged to serve over 600 students after receiving a million-dollar grant from the NFL in 1996.

== Yearly celebration at the shrine ==
The Ruizes' backyard shrine was an established pilgrimage site from 1989 to 1998. Ruiz appeared on the Geraldo Rivera Show and on the Sally Jessy Raphaël Show in the early 1990s and since then has traveled extensively to share her experiences. As a result, the shrine became one of the most frequented sites of the 1990s. The family also celebrates the anniversary of the first apparition, a celebration that has changed over time. While clergy have always been involved with the family and the phenomenon, the Church has become more involved over time as the shrine and Mary's Ministries have become more institutional. A procession was instituted in 1990, during which processioners carry holy images, statues, and crosses, sing hymns, and sprinkle holy water in the crime-ridden streets of South Phoenix. The hearing of confessions began in the early 1990s, and Mass and the Eucharist began in 1998. Attendance at the yearly celebration grew, peaking at about one thousand for the reading of the final message in 1998. Afterwards, the shrine was converted into an enclosed chapel, and the yard surrounding it was fenced in. Instead of being open to the community at all times, where it was one of the few neutral zones for South Phoenix's gangs, the chapel is now only open at certain hours. And since the final message, the yearly celebration has become more of a retreat for Mary's Ministries members, although the Matachina dancers who attended the first celebration and performed for the Virgin of Guadalupe still attend.

== Final apparition ==
In August 1998 Ruiz related that the Virgin of the Americas would soon stop issuing her public messages. Ruiz claimed to have received the final public message in December of the same year, but continues to receive personal and family messages. At the final, emotional reading, Ruiz read a message that focused on the Virgin's power of healing.

== Notes ==
1. Petrisko, 46
2. Nabhan-Warren, 34
3. (Ruiz's translation)
4. Petrisko, 8
5. Bishop Thomas O'Brien in The Catholic Sun, 18 January 1990, 14

== Sources ==
- Nabhan-Warren, Kristy (2005). The Virgin of El Barrio: Marian apparitions, Catholic evangelizing, and Mexican American activism. New York: New York University Press. ISBN 0-8147-5824-X.
- Petrisko, Thomas W. (1996). For the Soul of the Family. Santa Barbara, California: Queenship Publishing. ISBN 1-882972-90-2.
- Ruiz, Estela (1994). Our Lady of the Americas: The Messages of the Blessed Virgin Mary As Received by Estela Ruiz of South Phoenix, Arizona. St Andrews Productions. ISBN 1-891903-16-0.
