= Lori Toye =

American author

Lori Toye is a New Age author most notable for her I Am America Map, a 1983 poster showing an imagined map of the United States following a series of natural disasters and an asteroid strike.

== Purported visions ==
Toye claims that she had her first vision in 1983. In the vision, "Ascended Masters," named Saint Germain, Sananda, El Morya, and Kuthumi prophesied changes to the Earth’s land masses by unrolling a large map of North America that showed details of these changes. The map represents the earth's future geography after climatic earth changes due to earthquakes, drought, and other natural disasters. Toye's new earth is called Freedom Star, and major portions of it are under water. In the map, much of the Western United States sinks underwater after a giant asteroid hits Nevada. A new continent called New Lemuria forms west of South America. The tip of Florida, most of Maine, Delaware, and New Jersey are covered by the Atlantic, and the Mississippi River opens up and makes east Texas a huge bay. Additionally, most of the West Coast is covered, and opens into a large bay called the Bay of Harmony. The coast will go from San Diego to Salt Lake City through Sedona, AZ and Denver. Denver will be a beach front city on the Bay of Harmony and nicknamed the Golden Port.

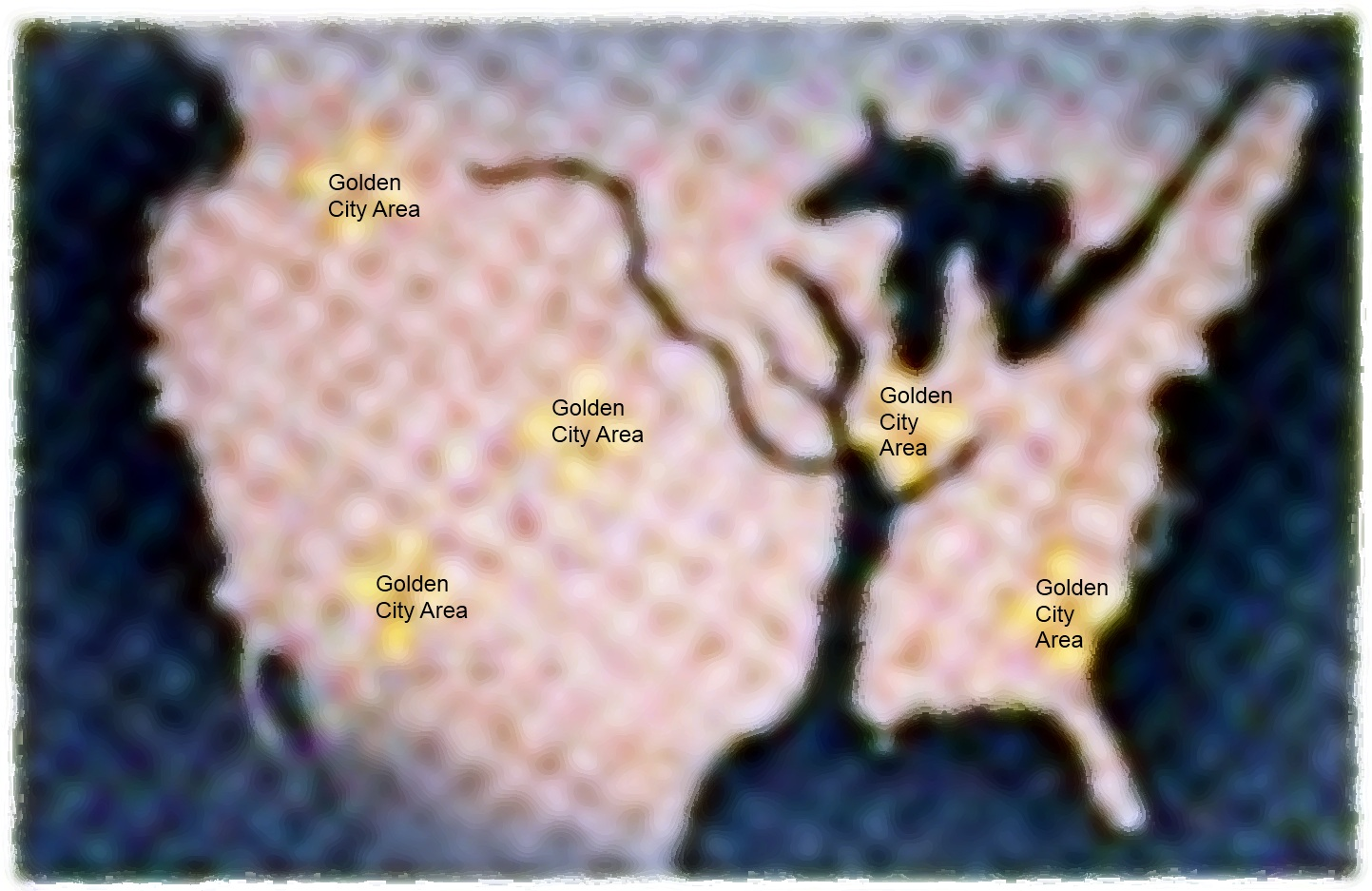
A representation of the location of the five "golden cities" envisioned by Toye, in a flooded United States

Toye claims that in 1988, she received more information from visions and drew a map, which she called the I Am America Map. She sold her home to raise money to publish her map, and in 1989 she began distributing free copies to magazines, organizations, and friends. She noted that "crime-infested" cities such as New York and Los Angeles were underwater in the maps, but that she believed that the prophecy could be avoided if people changed their thoughts and actions. Toye drew another map called the Golden City Map, which identifies certain areas of the United States that may become centers of "spiritual rebirth" after others are covered in water.

The I Am America Map sold more than 40,000 copies. In his book on world religions, Bob Larson says that Toye and the I Am America Map are at the "forefront of the Earth Changes movement."

In 2006, Toye published her updated prophecies in Earth Star Magazine.

== Publications ==
Toye is the author of Freedom Star: Prophecies that Heal Earth; A Teacher Appears; and the New World Atlas books. In addition to the I Am America map, Toye published and sold the Freedom Star World map, the Golden Cities map, and an Earth Changes Progression series of maps.

== Personal life ==
Toye lives in Payson, Arizona, and is married. In 1983, when she claims to have started receiving visions, she was "an Idaho farm wife and mother of several small children." At the time, she was a member of the Lutheran Church–Missouri Synod.
