= Earth Changes =

20th century prophecies

The phrase "Earth Changes" was coined by the American psychic Edgar Cayce in the 1930s in reference to his belief that the world would soon enter a series of cataclysmic events causing major alterations in human life on the planet.

This includes "natural events" (such as major earthquakes, the melting of the polar ice caps, a pole shift of the planetary axis, major weather events, solar flares and so on) as well as huge changes of the local and global social, economical and political systems.

Cayce's term was taken up in certain segments of the New Age movement, often associated with other predictions by people claiming to have psychic abilities. These beliefs have occasionally been associated with Christian millennialism and beliefs about UFOs. Some New Age adherents believe that Earth changes will preface a "Golden Age" of spirituality and world peace.

== Prophecies of Edgar Cayce ==
In the 1930s and 1940s, Cayce made many prophecies of cataclysmic events involving the whole planet, with a series of "earth changes" occurring between 1958 and 1998. He predicted that the polar axis would shift and that many areas that are now land would again become ocean floor, and that Atlantis would rise from the sea.

== Prophecies of others ==
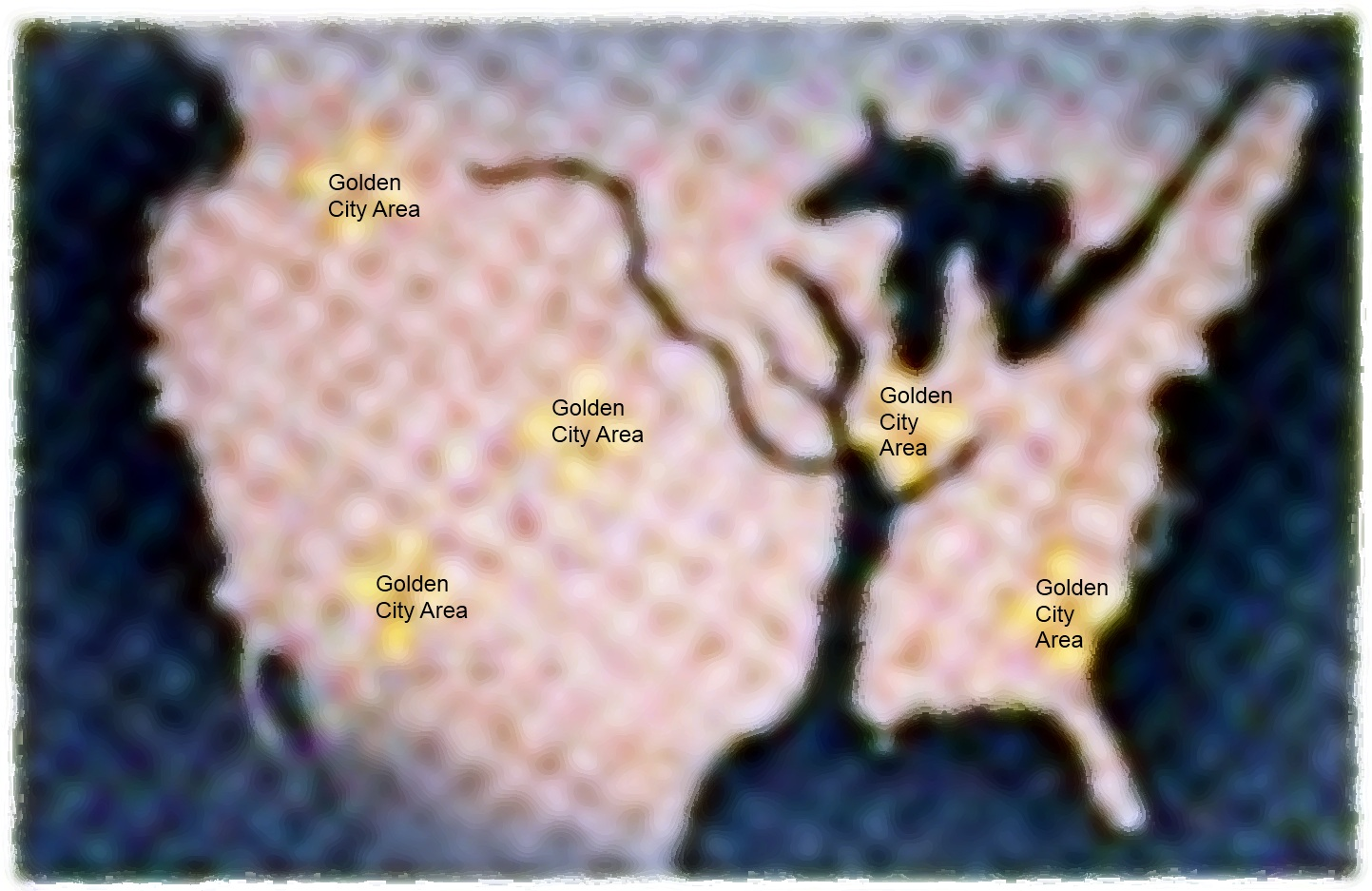
A representation of the location of the five "Golden Cities" envisioned by Toye, in a flooded United States

In the late 1980s, Lori Toye published the I Am America Map, based on several visions that she claimed to have beginning in 1983. The I Am America Map sold over 40,000 copies, and was followed by subsequent maps: Freedom Star World map, Golden Cities map, and an Earth Changes Progression series of maps. These maps represented the earth's future geography after climatic earth changes.

In 2004, "self-proclaimed psychic" Gordon-Michael Scallion issued a variety of prophecies centering on the concept of "Earth Changes". He publishes a monthly newsletter, The Earth Changes Report.

== Reception and interpretation ==
Prophecies of Earth changes have been described as a form of pseudoscience, in which terminology and ideas borrowed from science are used to rationalize non-scriptural apocalyptical thought based on visionary experiences. David Spangler, a leader of the Findhorn Foundation spiritual community, described prophecies of Earth changes as an expression of collective fear and anger, rather than as foretelling of actual future events.

== See also ==
- Catastrophism
- Eschatology
- Global catastrophic risk
- Nick Bostrom
- Sea level rise
