= Walter James Miller =

American poet

Walter James Miller (January 16, 1918 – June 20, 2010) was an American literary critic, playwright, poet, translator and publisher. The author, co-author, editor and/or translator of more than sixty books, including four landmark annotated translations of novels by Jules Verne, Miller taught at Hofstra University, Polytechnic Institute of New York University, Colorado State University, and for over 40 years at New York University, where he created and taught a popular "Great Books" course. In 1980, he received the NYU Alumni Great Teacher Award. For fifteen years in the 1960s and 1970s, his Peabody Award-winning show Reader's Almanac was a fixture on WNYC, public radio in New York City, and broadcast interviews with many established and rising authors and poets, including Nadine Gordimer, Andrew Glaze, Allen Ginsberg, James Kirkwood Jr., William Packard, Sidney Offit, Joseph Heller, Kurt Vonnegut Jr and Steven Kunes. (A compilation of Miller's several interviews with Vonnegut was published by Caedmon Audio in 2006.) The author of two published collections of poetry (Making an Angel, 1977, Love's Mainland, 2001), Miller's verse drama Joseph in the Pit was produced off-Broadway in 1993 and 2002.

A pioneering figure of modern Jules Verne studies, Miller's 1965 Washington Square Press edition of Verne's Twenty Thousand Leagues Under the Seas included both the first unabridged English translation of the novel and the first scholarly discussion of what he termed the problem of "the two Jules Vernes." European readers, Miller observed,

admire Verne for his attention to scientific method, his concern for technical accuracy, his ability to work wonders with authentic facts and figures.

But American readers have the impression that Verne is somewhat casual with basic data and arithmetic, even with the details of plot and character. Condescendingly, they think of the Voyages Extraordinary as "children's books." American science-fiction writers have clobbered Verne for his "vagueness" and for the "gaps" in his technical explanations.

Could they be talking about the same author?

The answer is tragically simple. Europeans read Verne in the original French or in good, full-length translations. Americans have based their opinions on slashed and slapdash versions rushed into print in the 1870s and reissued ever since as "standard" editions. Ironically, although Verne's books pay full tribute to American daring and know-how, Americans have never been able to judge the true nature and extent of Verne's genius.

Miller's analysis of the abridgment and mistranslation of Verne, and his call for accurate and complete English renderings, initiated a major reassessment by English-speaking critics of Verne's importance, and is credited with fostering the publication of numerous new English editions of Verne and the emergence of Verne studies as a serious academic discipline in the US and UK. Miller's scholarly editions of Twenty Thousand Leagues Under the Sea (1976), From the Earth to the Moon (1978), and (with Frederick Paul Walter) The Meteor Hunt (2006) were the first annotated editions of those novels in any language. His preface to the first English translation of Verne's The Mighty Orinoco (2002) has been described as the best critical commentary on this novel in French or English. A founding member of the North American Jules Verne Society and of the Editorial Board of Verniana – Jules Verne Studies / Etudes Jules Verne, in his later years Miller was a valued mentor to Verne scholars in the US, UK, Europe, and Asia.

Miller died before learning that the North American Jules Verne Society had decided to dedicate the fourth volume in its Palik Series of first-time Verne translations to him; the book dedicated to Miller, The Count of Chanteleine: A Tale of the French Revolution. Miller's last essay on Verne had appeared posthumously in the first volume in series, The Marriage of a Marquis, published in 2011.

== Sources ==
- Arthur B. Evans, "Two Titans Remembered: Walter James Miller (1918–2010) and E[verett] F[ranklin] Bleiler (1920–2010)." Science Fiction Studies 37.1 (2010).
- Obituary, New York Times, June 23, 2010.
- "Adult Education '96: Cool Classes, Great Teachers". New York. August 5, 1996.
- "Who is Walter James Miller?". Walter Talks Books.
