= Dirty Weekend (novel) =

1991 novel by Helen Zahavi

- First edition (UK)
- Author: Helen Zahavi
- Language: English
- Genre: Literary fiction
- Publisher: Macmillan, London; Donald I. Fine, New York
- Publication date: 1991
- Publication place: Great Britain & US
- Media type: Print (hardback)
- Pages: 185 (UK); 187 (US)
- ISBN: 978-0-333-54723-6
- LC Class: PR6076.A44 W44

Dirty Weekend (1991) is a novel by Helen Zahavi, adapted into a film two years later by Zahavi and director Michael Winner. In the US it was first published under the title The Weekend; some editions are subtitled "A Novel of Revenge".

== Plot introduction ==
Overturning the traditional notion of a pleasurable sex-filled dirty weekend, Zahavi's novel instead examines a weekend killing spree committed by Bella, a twenty-something former prostitute. She is targeted by men who sexually abuse women, but kills them instead of letting them victimize her. Over the course of the weekend she murders seven men through a variety of gruesome methods. In the end she escapes to a new life in the large, faceless city of London.

It is a picaresque novel: there is one central character, Bella, the picara, who is the only link to all the other characters. She meets and confronts one man after the other, kills him, and moves on to the next.

== Plot summary ==
Bella, a solitary young woman with a dubious past, has just arrived in Brighton. Having recently been dumped by her "boyfriend", all she wants is some peace and quiet in her newly rented small flat near Brunswick Square. Tim, a young man living in one of the houses across her backyard, takes a fancy to the new arrival and soon starts watching and eventually molesting her. He accosts her in the park and torments her with obscene phone calls.

The police are not really helpful, but Bella is scared. On a stroll through the Lanes, she sees a sign advertising sessions with a clairvoyant and, on the spur of the moment, she visits him. Her meeting with Nimrod serves as both an eye-opener and a catalyst. When Bella leaves Nimrod that Friday afternoon, her self-confidence has been restored, her mind is set, and she is ready for action: She has "had enough".

A few hours later Tim makes his last obscene phone call to Bella. At night she enters his flat through a window and batters the sleeping man's head with a hammer. On Saturday morning she goes to a gunshop, but all they are prepared to sell her is an airgun. When she leaves the shop she is followed by "Mr Brown", who does sell her an illegal weapon. On Saturday night, dressed to kill, she enters the lobby of one of the large seafront hotels and only has to wait for a few minutes until she is chatted up. Her unsuspecting victim is Norman, a clinical psychologist with a weight problem. Norman, who is attending a congress in Brighton, can easily persuade her to join him upstairs in his hotel room. Once there, he cannot get an erection, and overcompensates by beating Bella over the head with a shoe until one of her teeth breaks. Afterwards, he demands that Bella let him be her "slave". Bella takes the opportunity and, while Norman is bound and gagged, kills him by putting a plastic bag over his head.

On Sunday morning she finds a dentist who is willing to treat her tooth. After he has fixed her tooth, the dentist offers to give her a lift home. Instead, he drives into an empty multi-storey car park and forces Bella to perform oral sex on him. As a result, Bella kills him with his own Mercedes CE car. She steals the vehicle and soon afterwards comes to the rescue of an old tramp called "Liverpool Mary" who is biding her time in a cul-de-sac near Brighton station. She shoots three yuppie-style young men who, drunk and angry, are threatening to set fire to the bag lady.

On the same night, at 4 a.m., while walking along the beach near the deserted West Pier, she realizes that she is being watched. The man watching her, a serial killer, thinks he has found his next victim, but when he attacks Bella she stabs him with a flick-knife in the leg.

== See also ==
- Dirty Weekend (1993 film)
