= Helen Zahavi =

English novelist, screenwriter and translator

Helen Zahavi (born 1966) is an English novelist and screenwriter born and educated in London. Her father was sent to Britain with the Polish Army in the Second World War, while her mother's parents came from Odessa. Before becoming a writer, Zahavi worked as a Russian translator. She has spent several years in Paris.

== Dirty Weekend ==
Zahavi's first novel, Dirty Weekend (1991), caused a media storm on publication: critical reaction was extreme and polarised. A half-page article in The Sunday Times questioning the book's morality and the author's sanity set the tone for much of the press comment that followed. The book was attacked by Salman Rushdie, defended by Naomi Wolf, and analysed at length in both the broadsheet and popular press. Despite initial media hostility, the book went on to be a strong seller in the UK and in Europe.

Dirty Weekend has been translated into 13 languages, including Chinese, Japanese, Czech and Korean. It was shortlisted for the Whitbread First Novel Award and adapted as a film by Michael Winner, the director of Death Wish. Zahavi has a screen credit as co-writer and appeared with Winner on an edition of the Channel 4 discussion programme After Dark alongside, among others, the father of the so-called Yorkshire Ripper.

Zahavi has written three further novels – True Romance (1994), Donna and the Fatman (1998), and Brighton Boy (2013) – which have been widely reviewed and translated.

== Awards and nominations ==
- Dirty Weekend was shortlisted for the Whitbread First Novel Award in 1991.

== Bibliography ==
- Dirty Weekend (Macmillan, 1991) ISBN 9780333547236
- True Romance (Secker & Warburg, 1994) ISBN 9780436202070
- Donna and the Fatman (Anchor, 1998) ISBN 9781862300460
- Brighton Boy (Bestseller Books, 2013)
