= 1971–72 United States network television schedule =

The following is the 1971–72 network television schedule for the three major English language commercial broadcast networks in the United States. The schedule covers primetime hours from September 1971 through August 1972. The schedule is followed by a list per network of returning series, new series, and series cancelled after the 1970–71 season. All times are Eastern and Pacific, with certain exceptions, such as Monday Night Football.

This season saw a drastic change in scheduling, as the Prime Time Access Rule was enacted, limiting networks to provide not more than 21 hours of primetime programming a week, also giving the Sunday night 7:00-7:30pm slot and the 7:30-8:00pm slot on Mondays and Wednesdays through Saturdays back to local affiliates.

New fall series are highlighted in bold.

Each of the 30 highest-rated shows is listed with its rank and rating as determined by Nielsen Media Research.

The Public Broadcasting Service was in operation, but the schedule was set by each local station.

== Legend ==
- Gray indicates encore programming.
- Blue-gray indicates news programming.
- Light green indicates sporting events.
- Red indicates series being burned off and other regularly scheduled programs, including specials and movies.
- highlight Lime highlights indicates the number-one most watched program of the season.
- highlight Yellow highlights indicates the top-10 most watched programs of the season.
- highlight Cyan highlights indicates numbers 11-20 most watched programs of the season.
- highlight Magenta highlights indicates numbers 21-30 most watched programs of the season.
- highlight Highlights indicates that it falls in multiple of the above categories.

== Sunday ==
Network		7:30 PM	8:00 PM	8:30 PM	9:00 PM	9:30 PM	10:00 PM	10:30 PM
ABC		Local programming	The F.B.I. (17/22.4)		The ABC Sunday Night Movie (26/20.8)			
CBS	Fall	The CBS Sunday Night Movie				**Cade's County**		Local programming
CBS	Summer	The CBS Sunday Night Movie				**The Life of Leonardo da Vinci**		Local programming
NBC		The Wonderful World of Disney (19/22.0)		**The Jimmy Stewart Show**	Bonanza (20/21.9)		The Bold Ones: The New Doctors / The Lawyers	

Note: 60 Minutes aired at 6:00-7:00 pm on CBS from January to June 1972.

== Monday ==
Network		8:00 PM	8:30 PM	9:00 PM	9:30 PM	10:00 PM	10:30 PM
ABC	Fall	Nanny and the Professor	Local programming	ABC NFL Monday Night Football (25/20.9)			
ABC	Winter	**Monday Night Special**		The ABC Monday Night Movie			
CBS	Fall	Gunsmoke (4/26.0)		Here's Lucy (10/23.7) (Tied with The Mary Tyler Moore Show)	The Doris Day Show (23/21.2) (Tied with The Carol Burnett Show)	My Three Sons	Arnie
CBS	Winter	Gunsmoke (4/26.0)		Here's Lucy (10/23.7) (Tied with The Mary Tyler Moore Show)	The Doris Day Show (23/21.2) (Tied with The Carol Burnett Show)	The Sonny & Cher Comedy Hour (27/20.2)	
CBS	Summer	Gunsmoke (4/26.0)		Here's Lucy (10/23.7) (Tied with The Mary Tyler Moore Show)	The Doris Day Show (23/21.2) (Tied with The Carol Burnett Show)	Suspense Theatre	
CBS	Follow-Up	Gunsmoke (4/26.0)		Here's Lucy (10/23.7) (Tied with The Mary Tyler Moore Show)	The Doris Day Show (23/21.2) (Tied with The Carol Burnett Show)	**Cade's County**	
NBC	Fall	Rowan & Martin's Laugh-In (22/21.4)		NBC Monday Night at the Movies			
NBC	Summer	The Baseball World of Joe Garagiola (8:00) / Monday Night Baseball (8:15)					

== Tuesday ==
Network		7:30 PM	8:00 PM	8:30 PM	9:00 PM	9:30 PM	10:00 PM	10:30 PM
ABC		The Mod Squad (21/21.5)		ABC Movie of the Week (5/25.6)			Marcus Welby, M.D. (3/27.8)	
CBS	Fall	The Glen Campbell Goodtime Hour		Hawaii Five-O (12/23.6)		**Cannon** (28/19.8) (Tied with Room 222)		Local programming
CBS	Summer	**The Jerry Reed When You're Hot You're Hot Hour**		Hawaii Five-O (12/23.6)		**Cannon** (28/19.8) (Tied with Room 222)		Local programming
CBS	Follow-up	**The John Byner Comedy Hour**		Hawaii Five-O (12/23.6)		**Cannon** (28/19.8) (Tied with Room 222)		Local programming
NBC	Fall	Ironside (15/23.0)		**Sarge**		**The Funny Side**		Local programming
NBC	November	**Sarge**		**The Funny Side**		**James Garner as Nichols**		Local programming
NBC	Winter	Local programming				**James Garner as Nichols**		Local programming
NBC	Summer	**Ponderosa** (R)		NBC Action Playhouse (R)		**James Garner as Nichols**		Local programming

Note: The NBC 1972 summer series Ponderosa consisted of reruns of Bonanza episodes from the 1967-1970 period. More recent reruns of Bonanza also aired that summer under the show's original name in its regular Sunday evening time slot. NBC Action Playhouse consisted of reruns from Bob Hope Presents the Chrysler Theatre, with new introductions by Peter Marshall.

== Wednesday ==
Network		8:00 PM	8:30 PM	9:00 PM	9:30 PM	10:00 PM	10:30 PM
ABC	Fall	Bewitched	The Courtship of Eddie's Father	The Smith Family	**Shirley's World**	**The Man and the City**	
ABC	Winter	The Courtship of Eddie's Father	**The ABC Comedy Hour**		**The Persuaders!**		Local programming
ABC	Spring	The Courtship of Eddie's Father	The Smith Family	**The Marty Feldman Comedy Machine**	**The Persuaders!**		Local programming
ABC	Summer	**The Super**	**The Corner Bar**	**The Marty Feldman Comedy Machine**	**ABC Comedy Hour Presents the Kopykats** (R)		Local programming
CBS	Fall	The Carol Burnett Show (23/21.2) (Tied with The Doris Day Show)		Medical Center (13/23.5)		Mannix (7/24.8)	
CBS	Summer	**The David Steinberg Show**		Medical Center (13/23.5)		Mannix (7/24.8)	
NBC		Adam-12 (8/23.9) (Tied with Funny Face)	**The NBC Mystery Movie: Columbo** / McCloud / **McMillan & Wife** (14/23.2)			Night Gallery	

Note: The ABC 1972 summer series ABC Comedy Hour Presents the Kopykats consisted of reruns of ABC Comedy Hour from earlier in the year.

== Thursday ==
Network		8:00 PM	8:30 PM	9:00 PM	9:30 PM	10:00 PM	10:30 PM
ABC		Alias Smith and Jones		**Longstreet**		**Owen Marshall, Counselor at Law**	
CBS	Fall	**Bearcats!**		CBS Thursday Night Movie			
CBS	Winter	**Me and the Chimp**	My Three Sons	CBS Thursday Night Movie			
CBS	Summer	My World and Welcome to It (R)	My Three Sons	CBS Thursday Night Movie			
NBC	Fall	The Flip Wilson Show (2/28.2)		**Nichols**		The Dean Martin Show	
NBC	November	The Flip Wilson Show (2/28.2)		Ironside (15/23.0)		The Dean Martin Show	
NBC	Summer	The Flip Wilson Show (2/28.2)		Ironside (15/23.0)		**Dean Martin Presents the Bobby Darin Amusement Co.**	

Note: My World and Welcome to It consisted of reruns of NBC's 1969-70 sitcom.

== Friday ==
Network		8:00 PM	8:30 PM	9:00 PM	9:30 PM	10:00 PM	10:30 PM
ABC		The Brady Bunch	The Partridge Family (16/22.6)	Room 222 (28/19.8) (Tied with Cannon)	The Odd Couple	Love, American Style	
CBS	Fall	**The Chicago Teddy Bears**	**O'Hara, U.S. Treasury**		**The New CBS Friday Night Movie** (30/19.5)		
CBS	Winter	**O'Hara, U.S. Treasury**		**The New CBS Friday Night Movie** (30/19.5)			**The Don Rickles Show**
CBS	Summer	**O'Hara, U.S. Treasury**		**The New CBS Friday Night Movie** (30/19.5)			The Governor & J.J.
NBC	Fall	**The D.A.**	World Premiere Movie / Chronolog* (once a month)				Local programming
NBC	Winter	**Sanford and Son** (6/25.2)	World Premiere Movie / Chronolog* (once a month)				Local programming
NBC	Summer	**The Partners**	World Premiere Movie / Chronolog* (once a month)				Local programming

* formerly First Tuesday

== Saturday ==
Network		8:00 PM	8:30 PM	9:00 PM	9:30 PM	10:00 PM	10:30 PM
ABC	Fall	**Getting Together**	**Movie of the Weekend**			**The Persuaders!**	
ABC	Winter	Bewitched	**Movie of the Weekend**			**The Sixth Sense**	
ABC	Summer	Bewitched	**Movie of the Weekend**			**The Ken Berry "Wow" Show**	
CBS	Fall	All in the Family (1/34.0)	**Funny Face** (8/23.9) (Tied with Adam-12)	**The New Dick Van Dyke Show** (18/22.2)	The Mary Tyler Moore Show (10/23.7) (Tied with Here's Lucy)	Mission: Impossible	
CBS	Winter	All in the Family (1/34.0)	The Mary Tyler Moore Show (10/23.7) (Tied with Here's Lucy)	**The New Dick Van Dyke Show** (18/22.2)	Arnie	Mission: Impossible	
NBC	Fall	**The Partners**	**The Good Life**	NBC Saturday Night at the Movies			
NBC	Winter	**Emergency!**		NBC Saturday Night at the Movies			

== By network ==
=== ABC ===
**Returning Series**

- The ABC Monday Night Movie
- ABC Movie of the Week
- ABC NFL Monday Night Football
- The ABC Sunday Night Movie
- Alias Smith and Jones
- Bewitched
- The Brady Bunch
- The Courtship of Eddie's Father
- The F.B.I.
- Love, American Style
- Marcus Welby, M.D.
- The Mod Squad
- Nanny and the Professor
- The Odd Couple
- The Partridge Family
- Room 222
- The Smith Family

**New Series**

- **The ABC Comedy Hour** *
- **The Corner Bar** *
- **Getting Together**
- **The Ken Berry 'Wow' Show** *
- **Longstreet**
- **The Man and the City**
- **The Marty Feldman Comedy Machine** *
- **Monday Night Special** *
- **Movie of the Weekend**
- **Owen Marshall, Counselor at Law**
- **The Persuaders!**
- **Shirley's World**
- **The Sixth Sense** *
- **The Super** *

Not returning from 1970–71:

- Barefoot in the Park
- Dan August
- Danny Thomas in Make Room for Granddaddy
- The Immortal
- It Was a Very Good Year
- The Johnny Cash Show
- The Lawrence Welk Show (moved to syndication)
- Let's Make a Deal (remained on its daytime lineup)
- Matt Lincoln
- The Most Deadly Game
- The Newlywed Game (remained on its daytime lineup)
- The Pearl Bailey Show
- The Reel Game
- The Silent Force
- That Girl
- This Is Tom Jones
- The Val Doonican Show
- The Young Lawyers
- The Young Rebels

=== CBS ===
**Returning Series**

- 60 Minutes
- All in the Family
- Arnie
- The Carol Burnett Show
- CBS Thursday Night Movie
- The Doris Day Show
- The Glen Campbell Goodtime Hour
- Gunsmoke
- Hawaii Five-O
- Here's Lucy
- Mannix
- The Mary Tyler Moore Show
- Medical Center
- Mission: Impossible
- My Three Sons
- The Sonny & Cher Comedy Hour
- Suspense Theatre

**New Series**

- **Bearcats!**
- **Cade's County**
- **Cannon**
- **The Chicago Teddy Bears**
- **The David Steinberg Show** *
- **The Don Rickles Show** *
- **Funny Face** *
- **The Jerry Reed When You're Hot You're Hot Hour** *
- **The John Byner Comedy Hour** *
- **The Life of Leonardo da Vinci** *
- **Me and the Chimp** *
- **The New Dick Van Dyke Show**
- **O'Hara, U.S. Treasury**

Not returning from 1970–71:

- Animal World
- The Beverly Hillbillies
- The CBS Newcomers
- Comedy Playhouse
- The Ed Sullivan Show
- Family Affair
- The Governor & J.J.
- Green Acres
- Headmaster
- Hee Haw (moved to syndication)
- Hogan's Heroes
- The Ice Palace
- The Interns
- The Jim Nabors Hour
- Lassie (moved to syndication)
- Mayberry R.F.D.
- The New Andy Griffith Show
- Storefront Lawyers
- The Tim Conway Comedy Hour
- To Rome with Love

=== NBC ===
**Returning Series**

- Adam-12
- Bonanza
- The Bold Ones
- Columbo
- The Dean Martin Show
- The Flip Wilson Show
- Ironside
- McCloud
- Monday Night Baseball
- NBC Action Playhouse
- NBC Monday Night at the Movies
- The NBC Mystery Movie
- NBC Saturday Night at the Movies
- Night Gallery
- Rowan & Martin's Laugh-In
- The Wonderful World of Disney

**New Series**

- **The D.A.**
- **Dean Martin Presents the Bobby Darin Amusement Co.** *
- **Emergency!** *
- **The Funny Side**
- **The Good Life**
- **The Jimmy Stewart Show**
- **McMillan & Wife**
- **Nichols**
- **The Partners**
- **Sanford and Son** *
- **Sarge**

Not returning from 1970–71:

- The Andy Williams Show
- The Bill Cosby Show
- Bracken's World
- The Des O'Connor Show
- The Don Knotts Show
- Four in One
- From a Bird's Eye View
- The High Chaparral
- Julia
- Kraft Music Hall
- Make Your Own Kind of Music
- The Men from Shiloh
- The Name of the Game
- Nancy
- NBC Comedy Theater
- The Psychiatrist
- The Red Skelton Show
- San Francisco International Airport
- Strange Report
- Wild Kingdom (moved to syndication)

Note: The * indicates that the program was introduced in midseason.
