= List of most watched television broadcasts in the United States =

The following is the list of most watched television broadcasts in the United States by average viewership, according to Nielsen. Of the 30 most-watched telecasts, 27 are Super Bowls. The Apollo 11 moon landing is considered the most watched broadcast of all time, with an estimated viewership of 125–150 million. However, the Apollo 11 moon landing is considered a news event and not a telecast, as the major networks each produced their own coverage of the event; as a result, FOX's live telecast of Super Bowl LIX on February 9, 2025 holds the record for the largest average viewership of any live network American television broadcast, with 127.7 million viewers. Although not counted separately, the Super Bowl XXVII halftime show and Super Bowl LIX halftime show are indeed also estimated to have broken viewership records, with each watched by an estimated 133.5 million viewers.

== Most-watched broadcasts of all time ==
=== Average viewership ===
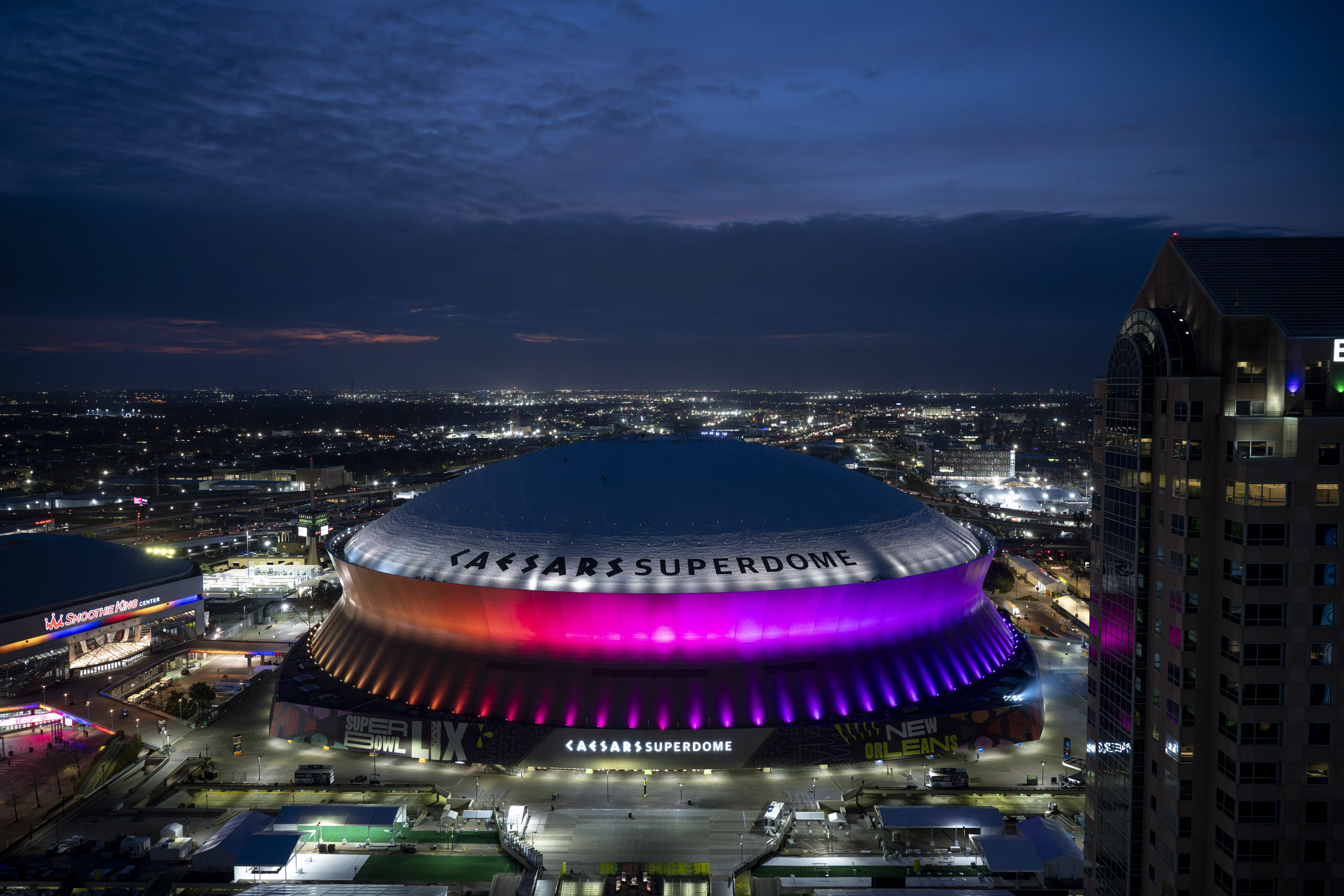
Caesars Superdome in New Orleans, Louisiana, was the site of Super Bowl LIX, the most-watched broadcast in American television history.

The Apollo 11 moon landing on July 20, 1969, is reported to have been watched by 125–150 million people. This figure has not been substantiated by Nielsen Media Research, which has only published figures for the moon landing based on household viewership. Additionally, although not counted separately, the Super Bowl XXVII halftime show in 1993 was considered as the most watched television broadcast of all time with 133.4 million viewers. This figure was surpassed in 2025 by the end of the second quarter and subsequent halftime show of Super Bowl LIX, with 135.7 and 133.5 million viewers over the two quarter-hour periods. In 2026, Super Bowl LX viewership peaked at 137.8 million viewers during the second quarter (7:45-8:00 p.m. ET), surpassing all previous figures in history.

Top 20 list of most-watched telecasts by average viewership according to Nielsen
Rank	Broadcast	Average viewers	Date	Network(s)
1	Super Bowl LIX	127,700,000	February 9, 2025	Fox / Fox Deportes / Telemundo / Tubi
2	Super Bowl LX	125,603,000	February 8, 2026	NBC / Universo
3	Super Bowl LVIII	123,714,000	February 11, 2024	CBS / Univision / Nickelodeon
4	Super Bowl LVII	115,096,000	February 12, 2023	Fox / Fox Deportes
5	Super Bowl XLIX	114,810,000	February 1, 2015	NBC / Universo
6	Super Bowl XLVIII	112,752,000	February 2, 2014	Fox / Fox Deportes
7	Super Bowl 50	112,336,000	February 7, 2016	CBS / ESPN Deportes
8	Super Bowl LI	111,973,000	February 5, 2017	Fox / Fox Deportes
9	Super Bowl XLVI	111,346,000	February 5, 2012	NBC
10	Super Bowl XLV	111,041,000	February 6, 2011	Fox
11	Super Bowl XLVII	108,693,000	February 3, 2013	CBS
12	Super Bowl XLIV	106,476,000	February 7, 2010	CBS
13	M*A*S*H ("Goodbye, Farewell and Amen")	105,970,000	February 28, 1983	CBS
14	Super Bowl LII	104,016,000	February 4, 2018	NBC / Universo
15	Super Bowl LIV	102,086,000	February 2, 2020	Fox / Fox Deportes
16	Super Bowl LVI	101,470,000	February 13, 2022	NBC / Telemundo
17	Super Bowl LIII	98,950,000	February 3, 2019	CBS / ESPN Deportes
18	Super Bowl XLIII	98,732,000	February 1, 2009	NBC
19	Super Bowl XLII	97,448,000	February 3, 2008	Fox
20	Super Bowl LV	95,877,000	February 7, 2021	CBS / ESPN Deportes

==== Excluding Super Bowls ====
List of most-watched television broadcasts by average viewership excluding Super Bowls
Rank	Broadcast	Average viewers (millions)	Date	Network
1	M*A*S*H ("Goodbye, Farewell and Amen")	106.0	February 28, 1983	CBS
2	Gulf War coverage	85.6	January 16, 1991	Multiple
3	First Clinton–Trump presidential debate	84.0	September 26, 2016	Multiple
4	Dallas ("Who Done It")	83.6	November 21, 1980	CBS
5	Carter–Reagan presidential debate	80.6	October 28, 1980	Multiple
6	Cheers ("One for the Road")	80.5	May 20, 1993	NBC
7	1994 Winter Olympics – Ladies' singles figure skating	78.8	February 23, 1994	CBS
8	The Day After	77.4	November 20, 1983	ABC
9	Roots ("Part VIII")	76.7	January 30, 1977	ABC
10	Seinfeld ("The Finale")	76.3	May 14, 1998	NBC

=== Series by year ===
Season	Live				Live + 3 DVR			Live + 7 DVR		
Season	Series	Network	Households (millions)	Viewers (millions)	Series	Network	Viewers (millions)	Series	Network	Viewers (millions)
1950s
1950–1951	Texaco Star Theatre	NBC	6.28	Unknown	—N/a	—N/a	—N/a	—N/a	—N/a	—N/a
1951–1952	Arthur Godfrey's Talent Scouts	CBS	8.23	Unknown	—N/a	—N/a	—N/a	—N/a	—N/a	—N/a
1952–1953	I Love Lucy	CBS	13.73	Unknown	—N/a	—N/a	—N/a	—N/a	—N/a	—N/a
1953–1954	I Love Lucy	CBS	15.29	Unknown	—N/a	—N/a	—N/a	—N/a	—N/a	—N/a
1954–1955	I Love Lucy	CBS	15.14	Unknown	—N/a	—N/a	—N/a	—N/a	—N/a	—N/a
1955–1956	The $64,000 Question	CBS	16.58	Unknown	—N/a	—N/a	—N/a	—N/a	—N/a	—N/a
1956–1957	I Love Lucy	CBS	17.00	Unknown	—N/a	—N/a	—N/a	—N/a	—N/a	—N/a
1957–1958	Gunsmoke	CBS	18.07	Unknown	—N/a	—N/a	—N/a	—N/a	—N/a	—N/a
1958–1959	Gunsmoke	CBS	17.40	Unknown	—N/a	—N/a	—N/a	—N/a	—N/a	—N/a
1959–1960	Gunsmoke	CBS	18.44	Unknown	—N/a	—N/a	—N/a	—N/a	—N/a	—N/a
1960s
1960–1961	Gunsmoke	CBS	17.61	Unknown	—N/a	—N/a	—N/a	—N/a	—N/a	—N/a
1961–1962	Wagon Train	NBC	15.59	Unknown	—N/a	—N/a	—N/a	—N/a	—N/a	—N/a
1962–1963	The Beverly Hillbillies	CBS	18.11	Unknown	—N/a	—N/a	—N/a	—N/a	—N/a	—N/a
1963–1964	The Beverly Hillbillies	CBS	20.18	Unknown	—N/a	—N/a	—N/a	—N/a	—N/a	—N/a
1964–1965	Bonanza	NBC	19.13	Unknown	—N/a	—N/a	—N/a	—N/a	—N/a	—N/a
1965–1966	Bonanza	NBC	17.12	Unknown	—N/a	—N/a	—N/a	—N/a	—N/a	—N/a
1966–1967	Bonanza	NBC	16.04	Unknown	—N/a	—N/a	—N/a	—N/a	—N/a	—N/a
1967–1968	The Andy Griffith Show	CBS	15.64	Unknown	—N/a	—N/a	—N/a	—N/a	—N/a	—N/a
1968–1969	Rowan & Martin's Laugh-In	NBC	18.52	Unknown	—N/a	—N/a	—N/a	—N/a	—N/a	—N/a
1969–1970	Rowan & Martin's Laugh-In	NBC	15.39	Unknown	—N/a	—N/a	—N/a	—N/a	—N/a	—N/a
1970s
1970–1971	Marcus Welby, M.D.	ABC	17.79	Unknown	—N/a	—N/a	—N/a	—N/a	—N/a	—N/a
1971–1972	All in the Family	CBS	21.11	Unknown	—N/a	—N/a	—N/a	—N/a	—N/a	—N/a
1972–1973	All in the Family	CBS	21.58	Unknown	—N/a	—N/a	—N/a	—N/a	—N/a	—N/a
1973–1974	All in the Family	CBS	20.65	Unknown	—N/a	—N/a	—N/a	—N/a	—N/a	—N/a
1974–1975	All in the Family	CBS	20.69	Unknown	—N/a	—N/a	—N/a	—N/a	—N/a	—N/a
1975–1976	All in the Family	CBS	20.95	Unknown	—N/a	—N/a	—N/a	—N/a	—N/a	—N/a
1976–1977	Happy Days	ABC	22.43	Unknown	—N/a	—N/a	—N/a	—N/a	—N/a	—N/a
1977–1978	Laverne & Shirley	ABC	23.04	Unknown	—N/a	—N/a	—N/a	—N/a	—N/a	—N/a
1978–1979	Laverne & Shirley	ABC	22.72	Unknown	—N/a	—N/a	—N/a	—N/a	—N/a	—N/a
1979–1980	60 Minutes	CBS	21.67	Unknown	—N/a	—N/a	—N/a	—N/a	—N/a	—N/a
1980s
1980–1981	Dallas	CBS	27.57	Unknown	—N/a	—N/a	—N/a	—N/a	—N/a	—N/a
1981–1982	Dallas	CBS	23.15	Unknown	—N/a	—N/a	—N/a	—N/a	—N/a	—N/a
1982–1983	60 Minutes	CBS	21.24	Unknown	—N/a	—N/a	—N/a	—N/a	—N/a	—N/a
1983–1984	Dallas	CBS	21.54	Unknown	—N/a	—N/a	—N/a	—N/a	—N/a	—N/a
1984–1985	Dynasty	ABC	21.23	Unknown	—N/a	—N/a	—N/a	—N/a	—N/a	—N/a
1985–1986	The Cosby Show	NBC	28.95	Unknown	—N/a	—N/a	—N/a	—N/a	—N/a	—N/a
1986–1987	The Cosby Show	NBC	30.50	Unknown	—N/a	—N/a	—N/a	—N/a	—N/a	—N/a
1987–1988	The Cosby Show	NBC	Unknown	Unknown	—N/a	—N/a	—N/a	—N/a	—N/a	—N/a
1988–1989	The Cosby Show	NBC	23.14	Unknown	—N/a	—N/a	—N/a	—N/a	—N/a	—N/a
1989–1990	The Cosby Show	NBC	21.28	Unknown	—N/a	—N/a	—N/a	—N/a	—N/a	—N/a
1989–1990	Roseanne	ABC	21.28	Unknown	—N/a	—N/a	—N/a	—N/a	—N/a	—N/a
1990s
1990–1991	Cheers	NBC	19.83	Unknown	—N/a	—N/a	—N/a	—N/a	—N/a	—N/a
1991–1992	60 Minutes	CBS	20.17	Unknown	—N/a	—N/a	—N/a	—N/a	—N/a	—N/a
1992–1993	60 Minutes	CBS	20.39	Unknown	—N/a	—N/a	—N/a	—N/a	—N/a	—N/a
1993–1994	60 Minutes	CBS	19.69	Unknown	—N/a	—N/a	—N/a	—N/a	—N/a	—N/a
1994–1995	Home Improvement (Note: During the 1994–1995 television season, ABC's Home Improvement was watched by the most viewers (32.50 million), while NBC's Seinfeld was watched by the most households (19.56 million).)	ABC	—N/a	32.50	—N/a	—N/a	—N/a	—N/a	—N/a	—N/a
1994–1995	Seinfeld	NBC	19.56	—N/a	—N/a	—N/a	—N/a	—N/a	—N/a	—N/a
1995–1996	ER	NBC	21.10	32.00	—N/a	—N/a	—N/a	—N/a	—N/a	—N/a
1996–1997	ER	NBC	20.56	30.79	—N/a	—N/a	—N/a	—N/a	—N/a	—N/a
1997–1998	Seinfeld	NBC	21.27	34.10	—N/a	—N/a	—N/a	—N/a	—N/a	—N/a
1998–1999	ER	NBC	17.69	25.40	—N/a	—N/a	—N/a	—N/a	—N/a	—N/a
1999–2000	Who Wants to Be a Millionaire (Tues)	ABC	Unknown	28.53	—N/a	—N/a	—N/a	—N/a	—N/a	—N/a
2000s
2000–2001	Survivor	CBS	28.80	29.80	—N/a	—N/a	—N/a	—N/a	—N/a	—N/a
2001–2002	Friends	NBC	22.30	24.50	—N/a	—N/a	—N/a	—N/a	—N/a	—N/a
2002–2003	CSI: Crime Scene Investigation	CBS	Unknown	26.12	—N/a	—N/a	—N/a	—N/a	—N/a	—N/a
2003–2004	American Idol (Tues)	Fox	Unknown	25.73	—N/a	—N/a	—N/a	—N/a	—N/a	—N/a
2004–2005	American Idol (Tues)	Fox	Unknown	27.32	—N/a	—N/a	—N/a	—N/a	—N/a	—N/a
2005–2006	American Idol (Tues)	Fox	Unknown	31.17	—N/a	—N/a	—N/a	—N/a	—N/a	—N/a
2006–2007	American Idol (Wed)	Fox	Unknown	30.58	—N/a	—N/a	—N/a	—N/a	—N/a	—N/a
2007–2008	American Idol (Tues)	Fox	Unknown	28.80	—N/a	—N/a	—N/a	—N/a	—N/a	—N/a
2008–2009	American Idol (Wed)	Fox	Unknown	25.53	—N/a	—N/a	—N/a	American Idol (Wed)	Fox	26.88
2009–2010	American Idol (Tues)	Fox	Unknown	22.97	—N/a	—N/a	—N/a	American Idol (Tues)	Fox	24.71
2010s
2010–2011	American Idol (Wed)	Fox	Unknown	23.95	—N/a	—N/a	—N/a	American Idol (Wed)	Fox	26.20
2011–2012	NBC Sunday Night Football	NBC	Unknown	Unknown	—N/a	—N/a	—N/a	NBC Sunday Night Football	NBC	20.74
2012–2013	NBC Sunday Night Football	NBC	Unknown	Unknown	—N/a	—N/a	—N/a	NCIS (Note: NBC Sunday Night Football aired three broadcasts before the official start of 2012–2013 television season which are not counted in the rankings. If these broadcasts were counted, NBC Sunday Night Football would average 21.44 million viewers—more than NCIS.)	CBS	21.34
2013–2014	NBC Sunday Night Football	NBC	Unknown	21.42	—N/a	—N/a	—N/a	The Big Bang Theory	CBS	23.10
2014–2015	NBC Sunday Night Football	NBC	Unknown	20.69	—N/a	—N/a	—N/a	NBC Sunday Night Football	NBC	20.81
2015–2016	NBC Sunday Night Football	NBC	Unknown	21.30	NBC Sunday Night Football	NBC	21.38	NBC Sunday Night Football	NBC	21.39
2016–2017	NBC Sunday Night Football	NBC	Unknown	19.63	NBC Sunday Night Football	NBC	19.73	NBC Sunday Night Football	NBC	19.75
2017–2018	NBC Sunday Night Football	NBC	Unknown	17.58	Roseanne	ABC	18.21	Roseanne	ABC	19.96
2018–2019	NBC Sunday Night Football	NBC	Unknown	18.80	NBC Sunday Night Football	NBC	18.92	NBC Sunday Night Football	NBC	18.94
2019–2020	NBC Sunday Night Football	NBC	Unknown	19.96	—N/a	—N/a	—N/a	NBC Sunday Night Football	NBC	20.09

== The highest-rated broadcasts of all time ==
The highest-rated broadcast of all time is the final episode of M*A*S*H in 1983, with 60.2% of all households with television sets in the United States at that time watching the episode. Aside from Super Bowls, the most recent broadcast to receive a rating above 40 was the Seinfeld finale in 1998, with a 41.3.

Nielsen only began recording a list of ratings for individual broadcasts starting in July 1960, therefore ratings before that time are not included in their official count.

Rank	Broadcast	Rating	Share	Date	Network
1	M*A*S*H ("Goodbye, Farewell and Amen")	60.2	77	February 28, 1983	CBS
2	Dallas ("Who Done It")	53.3	76	November 21, 1980	CBS
3	Roots ("Part VIII")	51.1	71	January 30, 1977	ABC
4	Super Bowl XVI	49.1	73	January 24, 1982	CBS
5	Super Bowl XVII	48.6	69	January 30, 1983	NBC
6	1994 Winter Olympics (Ladies' singles)	48.5	64	February 23, 1994	CBS
7	Super Bowl XX	48.3	70	January 26, 1986	NBC
8	The Big Event (Gone with the Wind, Part 1)	47.7	65	November 7, 1976	NBC
9	Super Bowl XLIX	47.5	71	February 1, 2015	NBC
10	Monday Night at the Movies (Gone with the Wind, Part 2)	47.4	64	November 8, 1976	NBC
11	Super Bowl XII	47.2	67	January 15, 1978	CBS
12	Super Bowl XIII	47.1	74	January 21, 1979	NBC
12	Super Bowl XLVI	47.0	71	February 5, 2012	NBC
13	Super Bowl XLVIII	46.7	69	February 2, 2014	Fox
14	The Bob Hope Vietnam Christmas Show	46.6	64	January 15, 1970	NBC
14	Super Bowl 50	46.6	72	February 7, 2016	CBS
16	Super Bowl XVIII	46.4	71	January 22, 1984	CBS
16	Super Bowl XIX	46.4	63	January 20, 1985	ABC
16	Super Bowl XLVII	46.4	69	February 3, 2013	CBS
19	Super Bowl XIV	46.3	67	January 20, 1980	CBS
20	The ABC Sunday Night Movie (The Day After)	46.0	62	November 20, 1983	ABC
20	Super Bowl XXX	46.0	68	January 28, 1996	NBC
20	Super Bowl XLV	46.0	69	February 6, 2011	Fox
23	The Fugitive ("The Judgment: Part 2")	45.9	72	August 29, 1967	ABC
23	Roots ("Part VI")	45.9	66	January 28, 1977	ABC
25	Super Bowl XXI	45.8	66	January 25, 1987	CBS
26	Roots ("Part V")	45.7	71	January 27, 1977	ABC
27	Cheers ("One for the Road")	45.5	64	May 20, 1993	NBC
27	Super Bowl XXVIII	45.5	66	January 30, 1994	NBC
29	The Ed Sullivan Show (The Beatles' first appearance)	45.3	60	February 9, 1964	CBS
29	Super Bowl LI	45.3	70	February 5, 2017	Fox
30	Super Bowl XXVII	45.1	66	January 31, 1993	NBC

=== Timeline ===
The following is a timeline of the highest-rated television broadcasts since December 17, 1960.

Timeline of the highest rated television broadcasts

=== Series by year ===
The following is a list of the highest-rated television series by year.

Season	Series	Network	Rating
1950s
1950–1951	Texaco Star Theatre	NBC	61.6
1951–1952	Arthur Godfrey's Talent Scouts	CBS	53.8
1952–1953	I Love Lucy	CBS	67.3
1953–1954	I Love Lucy	CBS	58.8
1954–1955	I Love Lucy	CBS	49.3
1955–1956	The $64,000 Question	CBS	47.5
1956–1957	I Love Lucy	CBS	43.7
1957–1958	Gunsmoke	CBS	43.1
1958–1959	Gunsmoke	CBS	39.6
1959–1960	Gunsmoke	CBS	40.3
1960s
1960–1961	Gunsmoke	CBS	37.3
1961–1962	Wagon Train	NBC	32.1
1962–1963	The Beverly Hillbillies	CBS	36.0
1963–1964	The Beverly Hillbillies	CBS	39.1
1964–1965	Bonanza	NBC	36.3
1965–1966	Bonanza	NBC	31.8
1966–1967	Bonanza	NBC	29.1
1967–1968	The Andy Griffith Show	CBS	27.6
1968–1969	Rowan & Martin's Laugh-In	NBC	31.8
1969–1970	Rowan & Martin's Laugh-In	NBC	26.3
1970s
1970–1971	Marcus Welby, M.D.	ABC	29.6
1971–1972	All in the Family	CBS	34.0
1972–1973	All in the Family	CBS	33.3
1973–1974	All in the Family	CBS	31.2
1974–1975	All in the Family	CBS	30.2
1975–1976	All in the Family	CBS	30.1
1976–1977	Happy Days	ABC	31.5
1977–1978	Laverne & Shirley	ABC	31.6
1978–1979	Laverne & Shirley	ABC	30.5
1979–1980	60 Minutes	CBS	28.4
1980s
1980–1981	Dallas	CBS	34.5
1981–1982	Dallas	CBS	28.4
1982–1983	60 Minutes	CBS	25.5
1983–1984	Dallas	CBS	25.7
1984–1985	Dynasty	ABC	25.0
1985–1986	The Cosby Show	NBC	33.7
1986–1987	The Cosby Show	NBC	34.9
1987–1988	The Cosby Show	NBC	27.8
1988–1989	The Cosby Show	NBC	25.6
1989–1990	The Cosby Show	NBC	23.1
1989–1990	Roseanne	ABC	23.1
1990s
1990–1991	Cheers	NBC	21.3
1991–1992	60 Minutes	CBS	21.9
1992–1993	60 Minutes	CBS	21.9
1993–1994	60 Minutes	CBS	20.9
1994–1995	Seinfeld	NBC	20.6
1995–1996	ER	NBC	22.0
1996–1997	ER	NBC	21.2
1997–1998	Seinfeld	NBC	21.7
1998–1999	ER	NBC	17.8
1999–2000	Who Wants to Be a Millionaire (Tues)	ABC	18.6
2000s
2000–2001	Survivor	CBS	17.4
2001–2002	Friends	NBC	15.0
2002–2003	CSI: Crime Scene Investigation	CBS	16.3
2003–2004	CSI: Crime Scene Investigation	CBS	15.9
2004–2005	CSI: Crime Scene Investigation	CBS	16.5
2005–2006	American Idol (Tues)	Fox	17.6
2006–2007	American Idol (Wed)	Fox	17.3
2007–2008	American Idol (Tues)	Fox	16.1
2008–2009	American Idol (Wed)	Fox	15.1
2009–2010	American Idol (Tues)	Fox	13.7
2010s
2010–2011	American Idol (Wed)	Fox	14.5
2011–2012	NBC Sunday Night Football	NBC	12.4
2012–2013	NCIS	CBS	13.5
2013–2014	NCIS	CBS	12.6
2013–2014	NBC Sunday Night Football	NBC	12.6
2014–2015	NBC Sunday Night Football	NBC	12.3
2015–2016	NCIS	CBS	12.8
2016–2017	The Big Bang Theory	CBS	11.5
2017–2018	The Big Bang Theory	CBS	11.1
2018–2019	NBC Sunday Night Football	NBC	10.9
2019–2020	NBC Sunday Night Football	NBC	20.09
2020–2021	NBC Sunday Night Football	NBC	16.50
2021–2022	NBC Sunday Night Football	NBC	18.0

== See also ==
- List of most-watched television broadcasts
