= Top-rated United States television programs of 1970–71 =

This table displays the top-rated primetime television series of the 1970–71 season as measured by Nielsen Media Research.

| Rank | Program | Network | Rating |
|---|---|---|---|
| 1 | Marcus Welby, M.D. | ABC | 29.6 |
| 2 | The Flip Wilson Show | NBC | 27.9 |
| 3 | Here's Lucy | CBS | 26.1 |
| 4 | Ironside | NBC | 25.7 |
| 5 | Gunsmoke | CBS | 25.5 |
| 6 | ABC Movie of the Week | ABC | 25.1 |
| 7 | Hawaii Five-O | CBS | 25.0 |
| 8 | Medical Center | CBS | 24.5 |
| 9 | Bonanza | NBC | 23.9 |
| 10 | The F.B.I. | ABC | 23.0 |
| 11 | The Mod Squad | ABC | 22.7 |
| 12 | Adam-12 | NBC | 22.6 |
| 13 | Rowan & Martin's Laugh-In | NBC | 22.4 |
| 13 | The Wonderful World of Disney | NBC | 22.4 |
| 15 | Mayberry R.F.D. | CBS | 22.3 |
| 16 | Hee Haw | CBS | 21.4 |
| 17 | Mannix | CBS | 21.3 |
| 18 | The Men from Shiloh | NBC | 21.2 |
| 19 | My Three Sons | CBS | 20.8 |
| 20 | The Doris Day Show | CBS | 20.7 |
| 21 | The Smith Family | ABC | 20.6 |
| 22 | The Mary Tyler Moore Show | CBS | 20.3 |
| 23 | NBC Saturday Movie | NBC | 20.1 |
| 24 | The Dean Martin Show | NBC | 20.0 |
| 25 | The Carol Burnett Show | CBS | 19.8 |
| 25 | The Partridge Family | ABC | 19.8 |
| 25 | NBC Monday Movie | NBC | 19.8 |
| 28 | ABC Sunday Movie | ABC | 19.7 |
| 29 | The Jim Nabors Hour | CBS | 19.5 |
| 30 | CBS Thursday Movie | CBS | 19.3 |
