= Top-rated United States television programs of 1993–94 =

This table displays the top-rated primetime television series of the 1993–94 season as measured by Nielsen Media Research.

Rank	Program	Network	Rating
1	60 Minutes	CBS	20.9
2	Home Improvement	ABC	20.4
3	Seinfeld	NBC	19.4
4	Roseanne	ABC	19.1
5	Grace Under Fire	ABC	17.7
6	Coach	ABC	17.4
7	Frasier	NBC	16.8
8	Monday Night Football	ABC	16.5
9	Murphy Brown	CBS	16.3
10	CBS Sunday Movie	CBS	16.2
11	Murder, She Wrote	CBS	16.0
12	Thunder Alley	ABC	15.9
13	Love & War	CBS	14.5
14	Northern Exposure	CBS	14.4
15	20/20	ABC	14.3
16	Full House	ABC	14.2
17	Primetime Live	ABC	14.0
18	NYPD Blue	ABC	13.9
18	Wings	NBC	13.9
20	Turning Point	ABC	13.8
21	Dave's World	CBS	13.7
21	The Fresh Prince of Bel-Air	NBC	13.7
23	NBC Monday Movie	NBC	13.6
24	Homicide: Life on the Street	NBC	13.5
25	CBS Tuesday Movie	CBS	13.3
25	Dr. Quinn, Medicine Woman	CBS	13.3
27	Phenom	ABC	13.2
27	Evening Shade	CBS	13.2
27	Rescue 911	CBS	13.2
30	ABC Sunday Night Movie	ABC	12.6
30	Family Matters	ABC	12.6
