= Top-rated United States television programs of 1972–73 =

This table displays the top-rated primetime television series of the 1972–73 season as measured by Nielsen Media Research.

| Rank | Program | Network | Rating |
|---|---|---|---|
| 1 | All in the Family | CBS | 33.3 |
| 2 | Sanford and Son | NBC | 27.6 |
| 3 | Hawaii Five-O | CBS | 25.2 |
| 4 | Maude | CBS | 24.7 |
| 5 | Bridget Loves Bernie | CBS | 24.2 |
| 5 | The NBC Sunday Mystery Movie | NBC | 24.2 |
| 7 | The Mary Tyler Moore Show | CBS | 23.6 |
| 7 | Gunsmoke | CBS | 23.6 |
| 9 | The Wonderful World of Disney | NBC | 23.5 |
| 10 | Ironside | NBC | 23.4 |
| 11 | Adam-12 | NBC | 23.3 |
| 12 | The Flip Wilson Show | NBC | 23.1 |
| 13 | Marcus Welby, M.D. | ABC | 22.9 |
| 14 | Cannon | CBS | 22.4 |
| 15 | Here's Lucy | CBS | 21.9 |
| 16 | The Bob Newhart Show | CBS | 21.8 |
| 17 | Tuesday Movie of the Week | ABC | 21.5 |
| 18 | Monday Night Football | ABC | 21.0 |
| 19 | The Partridge Family | ABC | 20.6 |
| 19 | The Waltons | CBS | 20.6 |
| 19 | Medical Center | CBS | 20.6 |
| 22 | The Carol Burnett Show | CBS | 20.3 |
| 23 | ABC Sunday Movie | ABC | 20.0 |
| 23 | The Rookies | ABC | 20.0 |
| 25 | Barnaby Jones | CBS | 19.9 |
| 25 | The Little People | NBC | 19.9 |
| 25 | ABC Wednesday Movie of the Week | ABC | 19.9 |
| 28 | NBC Monday Movie | NBC | 19.3 |
| 29 | ABC Monday Movie | ABC | 19.2 |
| 29 | The F.B.I. | ABC | 19.2 |
| 29 | Kung Fu | ABC | 19.2 |
