= Top-rated United States television programs of 1971–72 =

This table displays the top-rated primetime television series of the 1971–72 season as measured by Nielsen Media Research.

Rank	Program	Network	Rating
1	All in the Family	CBS	34.0
2	The Flip Wilson Show	NBC	28.2
3	Marcus Welby, M.D.	ABC	27.8
4	Gunsmoke	CBS	26.0
5	ABC Movie of the Week	ABC	25.6
6	Sanford and Son	NBC	25.2
7	Mannix	CBS	24.8
8	Funny Face	CBS	23.9
8	Adam-12	NBC	23.9
10	The Mary Tyler Moore Show	CBS	23.7
10	Here's Lucy	CBS	23.7
12	Hawaii Five-O	CBS	23.6
13	Medical Center	CBS	23.5
14	The NBC Mystery Movie	NBC	23.2
15	Ironside	NBC	23.0
16	The Partridge Family	ABC	22.6
17	The F.B.I.	ABC	22.4
18	The New Dick Van Dyke Show	CBS	22.2
19	The Wonderful World of Disney	NBC	22.0
20	Bonanza	NBC	21.9
21	The Mod Squad	ABC	21.5
22	Rowan & Martin's Laugh-In	NBC	21.4
23	The Carol Burnett Show	CBS	21.2
23	The Doris Day Show	CBS	21.2
25	Monday Night Football	ABC	20.9
26	ABC Sunday Movie	ABC	20.8
27	The Sonny & Cher Comedy Hour	CBS	20.2
28	Room 222	ABC	19.8
28	Cannon	CBS	19.8
30	CBS Friday Movie	CBS	19.5
