= List of most watched United States television broadcasts of 1982 =

The following is a list of most watched United States television broadcasts of 1982.

== Most watched by week ==
Broadcast (primetime only)
Week of	Title	Network	Households (in millions)	Ref.
January 4	NFC Championship	CBS	38.7	
January 11	Dallas	CBS	25.5	
January 18	Unknown			
January 25	Unknown			
February 1	60 Minutes	CBS	24.7	
February 8	The ABC Sunday Night Movie	ABC	24.7	
February 15	Dallas	CBS	24.5	
February 22	Dallas	CBS	24.6	
March 1	60 Minutes	CBS	24.2	
March 8	Dallas	CBS	22.1	
March 15	Dallas	CBS	22.0	
March 22	Dallas	CBS	22.4	
