= 1996–97 United States network television schedule =

Television schedule for the fall of 1996

The 1996–97 United States network television schedule for the six major English language commercial broadcast networks in the United States covers the primetime hours from September 1996 to August 1997. The schedule is followed by a list per network of returning series, new series, and series canceled after the 1995–96 season.

PBS is not included; member stations have local flexibility over most of their schedules and broadcast times for network shows may vary.

Each of the 30 highest-rated shows released in May 1997 is listed with its rank and rating as determined by Nielsen Media Research.

New series highlighted in bold.

Repeat airings or same-day rebroadcasts are indicated by (R).

All times are U.S. Eastern and Pacific Time (except for some live sports or events). Subtract one hour for Central, Mountain, Alaska and Hawaii–Aleutian times.

All sporting events air live in all time zones in U.S. Eastern time, with local and/or late-night programming (including Fox affiliates during the 10 p.m. ET/PT hour) by affiliates after game completion.

The WB expanded three nights a week with the new Monday Night lineup for the first time from fall 1996.

== Legend ==
- Light blue indicates local programming.
- Gray indicates encore programming.
- Blue-gray indicates news programming.
- Light green indicates sporting events.
- Red indicates series being burned off and other irregularly scheduled programs, including specials and movies.
- Light gold indicates programming produced outside of the United States.
- highlight Yellow highlights indicates the top-10 most watched programs of the season.
- highlight Cyan highlights indicates numbers 11-20 most watched programs of the season.
- highlight Magenta highlights indicates numbers 21-30 most watched programs of the season.
- highlight Highlights indicates that it falls in multiple of the above categories.

== Sunday ==
Network		7:00 p.m.	7:30 p.m.	8:00 p.m.	8:30 p.m.	9:00 p.m.	9:30 p.m.	10:00 p.m.	10:30 p.m.
ABC	Fall	America's Funniest Home Videos	America's Funniest Home Videos	Lois & Clark: The New Adventures of Superman		The ABC Sunday Night Movie			
ABC	Winter	Lois & Clark: The New Adventures of Superman		America's Funniest Home Videos	America's Funniest Home Videos	The ABC Sunday Night Movie			
ABC	Spring	America's Funniest Home Videos	America's Funniest Home Videos	ABC News programming		The ABC Sunday Night Movie			
ABC	Summer	Second Noah		America's Funniest Home Videos	America's Funniest Home Videos	The ABC Sunday Night Movie			
ABC	Late summer	Special programming		America's Funniest Home Videos	America's Funniest Home Videos	The ABC Sunday Night Movie			
CBS		60 Minutes (11/13.3)		Touched by an Angel (10/13.6)		CBS Sunday Movie (14/12.1)			
Fox	Fall	**Big Deal**		Fox Movie Special				Local programming	
Fox	Mid-fall	Married... with Children (R)	Married... with Children	The Simpsons	Ned & Stacey	The X-Files (21/11.4) (Tied with Cosby)		Local programming	
Fox	Winter	Special programming		The Simpsons	**King of the Hill**	The X-Files (21/11.4) (Tied with Cosby)		Local programming	
Fox	Spring	Special programming		The Simpsons	**King of the Hill**	The X-Files (21/11.4) (Tied with Cosby)		Local programming	
Fox	Summer	**Beyond Belief: Fact or Fiction**		The Simpsons	**King of the Hill**	The X-Files (21/11.4) (Tied with Cosby)		Local programming	
Fox	Mid-summer	Special programming		The Simpsons	**King of the Hill**	The X-Files (21/11.4) (Tied with Cosby)		Local programming	
Fox	Late summer	**Beyond Belief: Fact or Fiction**		The Simpsons	**King of the Hill**	The X-Files (21/11.4) (Tied with Cosby)		Local programming	
NBC	Fall	Dateline NBC		3rd Rock from the Sun (27/10.8) (Tied with Law & Order)	Boston Common	NBC Sunday Night Movie (18/11.5) (Tied with The Drew Carey Show)			
NBC	Winter	Dateline NBC		3rd Rock from the Sun (27/10.8) (Tied with Law & Order)	Boston Common	NBC Sunday Night Movie (18/11.5) (Tied with The Drew Carey Show)			
NBC	Spring	Dateline NBC		3rd Rock from the Sun (27/10.8) (Tied with Law & Order)	Boston Common	NBC Sunday Night Movie (18/11.5) (Tied with The Drew Carey Show)			
NBC	Summer	Dateline NBC		3rd Rock from the Sun (27/10.8) (Tied with Law & Order)	NewsRadio (R)	NBC Sunday Night Movie (18/11.5) (Tied with The Drew Carey Show)			
The WB	Fall	Kirk	Brotherly Love	The Parent 'Hood	**The Steve Harvey Show**	Unhappily Ever After	**Life with Roger**	Local programming	
The WB	Mid-fall	Brotherly Love (R)	Brotherly Love	The Parent 'Hood	**The Steve Harvey Show**	Unhappily Ever After	**Life with Roger**	Local programming	
The WB	Winter	Brotherly Love	**Nick Freno: Licensed Teacher**	The Parent 'Hood	**The Steve Harvey Show**	Unhappily Ever After	**Life with Roger**	Local programming	
The WB	Spring	Brotherly Love	**Nick Freno: Licensed Teacher**	The Parent 'Hood	**The Steve Harvey Show**	Unhappily Ever After	**Life with Roger**	Local programming	
The WB	Summer	**Nick Freno: Licensed Teacher**	The Parent 'Hood	**The Steve Harvey Show** (R)	**The Steve Harvey Show**	Unhappily Ever After	The Wayans Bros. (R)	Local programming	
The WB	Mid-summer	**Nick Freno: Licensed Teacher**	The Parent 'Hood	**Buffy the Vampire Slayer** (R)		Unhappily Ever After	The Wayans Bros. (R)	Local programming	
The WB	Late summer	**Nick Freno: Licensed Teacher**	The Parent 'Hood	**The Jamie Foxx Show** (R)	**The Jamie Foxx Show** (R)	Unhappily Ever After	The Wayans Bros. (R)	Local programming	

== Monday ==
Network		8:00 p.m.	8:30 p.m.	9:00 p.m.	9:30 p.m.	10:00 p.m.	10:30 p.m.
ABC	Fall	**Dangerous Minds**		Monday Night Football (7/16.0)			
ABC	Winter	**Dangerous Minds**		The ABC Monday Night Movie			
ABC	Late winter	**Spy Game**		The ABC Monday Night Movie			
ABC	Spring	**Relativity**		The ABC Monday Night Movie			
ABC	Mid-spring	Special programming		The ABC Monday Night Movie			
ABC	Summer	**World of Discovery** (R)		The ABC Monday Night Movie			
ABC	Mid-summer	Monday Night Football Preseason					
CBS	Fall	**Cosby** (21/11.2) (Tied with The X-Files)	**Pearl**	Murphy Brown	Cybill (30/10.5) (Tied with Chicago Hope and Dateline NBC)	Chicago Hope (30/10.5) (Tied with Dateline NBC and Cybill)	
CBS	Mid-fall	**Cosby** (21/11.2) (Tied with The X-Files)	**Ink**	Murphy Brown	Cybill (30/10.5) (Tied with Chicago Hope and Dateline NBC)	Chicago Hope (30/10.5) (Tied with Dateline NBC and Cybill)	
CBS	Winter	**Cosby** (21/11.2) (Tied with The X-Files)	**Everybody Loves Raymond**	Cybill (30/10.5) (Tied with Chicago Hope and Dateline NBC)	**Ink**	Chicago Hope (30/10.5) (Tied with Dateline NBC and Cybill)	
CBS	Spring	**Cosby** (21/11.2) (Tied with The X-Files)	Murphy Brown	Cybill (30/10.5) (Tied with Chicago Hope and Dateline NBC)	**Ink**	Chicago Hope (30/10.5) (Tied with Dateline NBC and Cybill)	
CBS	Late spring	**Cosby** (21/11.2) (Tied with The X-Files)	**Everybody Loves Raymond** (R)	Cybill (30/10.5) (Tied with Chicago Hope and Dateline NBC)	Murphy Brown (R)	Chicago Hope (30/10.5) (Tied with Dateline NBC and Cybill)	
Fox	Fall	Melrose Place		**Party Girl**	**Lush Life**	Local programming	
Fox	Mid-Fall	Melrose Place		Special programming		Local programming	
Fox	Winter	Melrose Place		Ned and Stacey	Married... with Children	Local programming	
Fox	Late winter	Melrose Place		Married... with Children	**Pauly**	Local programming	
Fox	Late Spring	MADtv Primetime	**The Ruby Wax Show**	Married... with Children (R)		Local programming	
Fox	Summer	Various programming		**Roar**		Local programming	
NBC	Fall	The Jeff Foxworthy Show	**Mr. Rhodes**	The NBC Monday Movie (23/11.0) (Tied with Walker, Texas Ranger, Mad About You and Caroline in the City)			
NBC	Spring	The Jeff Foxworthy Show	Boston Common	The NBC Monday Movie (23/11.0) (Tied with Walker, Texas Ranger, Mad About You and Caroline in the City)			
NBC	Late spring	The NBC Monday Movie (23/11.0) (Tied with Walker, Texas Ranger, Mad About You and Caroline in the City)				Dateline NBC	
NBC	Summer	**Suddenly Susan** (R)	**Fired Up** (R)	Caroline in the City (R)	Wings (R)	Dateline NBC	
UPN	Fall	In the House	**Malcolm & Eddie**	**Goode Behavior**	**Sparks**	Local programming	
UPN	Winter	In the House	**Malcolm & Eddie**	**Sparks**	**Goode Behavior**	Local programming	
The WB	Fall	**7th Heaven**		Savannah		Local programming	
The WB	Winter	**7th Heaven**		**Buffy the Vampire Slayer**		Local programming	

Note: On CBS, the debut of Ink was delayed by a month due to production problems, resulting in another new sitcom, Pearl, which aired temporarily in its slot before moving to its own originally designated Wednesday time period in late October.

== Tuesday ==
Network		8:00 p.m.	8:30 p.m.	9:00 p.m.	9:30 p.m.	10:00 p.m.	10:30 p.m.
ABC	Fall	Roseanne	**Life's Work**	Home Improvement (9/14.0)	**Spin City** (17/11.7)	NYPD Blue (13/12.5)	
ABC	Winter	Roseanne	Ellen (R)	Home Improvement (9/14.0)	**Spin City** (17/11.7)	NYPD Blue (13/12.5)	
ABC	Late winter	Roseanne	Ellen (R)	Home Improvement (9/14.0)	**Spin City** (17/11.7)	**The Practice**	
ABC	Spring	Home Improvement (R)	**Soul Man**	Home Improvement (9/14.0)	**Spin City** (17/11.7)	NYPD Blue (13/12.5)	
ABC	Late spring	Roseanne	**Life's Work**	Home Improvement (9/14.0)	**Spin City** (17/11.7)	NYPD Blue (13/12.5)	
ABC	Summer	Roseanne	Grace Under Fire (R)	Home Improvement (9/14.0)	**Spin City** (17/11.7)	NYPD Blue (13/12.5)	
CBS		**Promised Land**		CBS Tuesday Movie			
Fox		Fox Tuesday Night Movie				Local programming	
NBC	Fall	Mad About You (23/11.0) (Tied with Walker, Texas Ranger, Caroline in the City and The NBC Monday Movie)	**Something So Right**	Frasier (16/11.8)	Caroline in the City (23/11.0) (Tied with Walker, Texas Ranger Mad About You and The NBC Monday Movie)	Dateline Tuesday (20/11.4)	
NBC	Summer	Mad About You (23/11.0) (Tied with Walker, Texas Ranger, Caroline in the City and The NBC Monday Movie)	The Naked Truth (R)	Frasier (16/11.8)	Caroline in the City (23/11.0) (Tied with Walker, Texas Ranger Mad About You and The NBC Monday Movie)	Dateline Tuesday (20/11.4)	
NBC	Mid-summer	Mad About You (23/11.0) (Tied with Walker, Texas Ranger, Caroline in the City and The NBC Monday Movie)	NewsRadio (R)	Frasier (16/11.8)	**Just Shoot Me!** (R)	Dateline Tuesday (20/11.4)	
UPN	Fall	Moesha	**Homeboys in Outer Space**	**The Burning Zone**		Local programming	
UPN	Winter	Moesha	**Social Studies**	**The Burning Zone**		Local programming	
UPN	Spring	Moesha	**Homeboys in Outer Space**	**The Burning Zone**		Local programming	
UPN	Summer	Moesha	**Social Studies** (R)	**Malcolm & Eddie** (R)	In the House (R)	Local programming	

== Wednesday ==
Network		8:00 p.m.	8:30 p.m.	9:00 p.m.	9:30 p.m.	10:00 p.m.	10:30 p.m.
ABC	Fall	Ellen (29/10.6)	**Townies**	Grace Under Fire	The Drew Carey Show (18/11.5) (Tied with The NBC Sunday Night Movie)	Primetime Live (15/11.9)	
ABC	Winter	Grace Under Fire	Coach	The Drew Carey Show (18/11.5) (Tied with The NBC Sunday Night Movie)	Ellen (29/10.6)	Primetime Live (15/11.9)	
ABC	Late winter	Grace Under Fire	Coach	The Drew Carey Show (18/11.5) (Tied with The NBC Sunday Night Movie)	**Arsenio**	Primetime Live (15/11.9)	
ABC	Spring	Grace Under Fire	Coach	The Drew Carey Show (18/11.5) (Tied with The NBC Sunday Night Movie)	Ellen (29/10.6)	Primetime Live (15/11.9)	
CBS	Fall	The Nanny	Almost Perfect	CBS Wednesday Movie			
CBS	Mid-fall	The Nanny	**Pearl**	CBS Wednesday Movie			
CBS	Winter	The Nanny	**Pearl**	**Coast to Coast**		**Orleans**	
CBS	Late winter	The Nanny	**Temporarily Yours**	**Feds**		**EZ Streets**	
CBS	Spring	The Nanny	Various programming	CBS Wednesday Movie			
CBS	Late spring	The Nanny	**Pearl**	CBS Wednesday Movie			
CBS	Summer	The Nanny	Murphy Brown (R)	**Coast to Coast**		48 Hours	
Fox	Fall	Beverly Hills, 90210		Party of Five		Local programming	
Fox	Winter	Beverly Hills, 90210		Party of Five		Local programming	
Fox	Spring	Beverly Hills, 90210		**Pacific Palisades**		Local programming	
Fox	Summer	Special programming		**Pacific Palisades**		Local programming	
NBC	Fall	Wings	The John Larroquette Show	NewsRadio	**Men Behaving Badly**	Law & Order (27/10.8) (Tied with 3rd Rock from the Sun)	
NBC	Mid-fall	Wings	Various programming	NewsRadio	**Men Behaving Badly**	Law & Order (27/10.8) (Tied with 3rd Rock from the Sun)	
NBC	Winter	Wings	**Chicago Sons**	NewsRadio	**Men Behaving Badly**	Law & Order (27/10.8) (Tied with 3rd Rock from the Sun)	
NBC	Late winter	NewsRadio	**Chicago Sons**	Wings	**Just Shoot Me!**	**Prince Street**	
NBC	Spring	NewsRadio	The Single Guy (8/14.1)	Wings	**Men Behaving Badly**	Law & Order (27/10.8) (Tied with 3rd Rock from the Sun)	
NBC	Mid-spring	NewsRadio	Various programming	Wings	**Men Behaving Badly**	Law & Order (27/10.8) (Tied with 3rd Rock from the Sun)	
NBC	Summer	NewsRadio	**Men Behaving Badly**	NBA on NBC			
NBC	Mid-summer	NewsRadio	Various programming	Wings	**Chicago Sons**	Law & Order (27/10.8) (Tied with 3rd Rock from the Sun)	
NBC	Late summer	NBC Wednesday Night Movie				Law & Order (27/10.8) (Tied with 3rd Rock from the Sun)	
UPN		The Sentinel		Star Trek: Voyager		Local programming	
The WB	Fall	Sister, Sister	**Nick Freno: Licensed Teacher**	The Wayans Bros.	**The Jamie Foxx Show**	Local programming	
The WB	Winter	Sister, Sister	**Nick Freno: Licensed Teacher**	The Wayans Bros.	**The Jamie Foxx Show**	Local programming	
The WB	Spring	Sister, Sister	**Smart Guy**	**The Jamie Foxx Show**	The Wayans Bros.	Local programming	
The WB	Summer	Sister, Sister	The Parent 'Hood (R)	**The Jamie Foxx Show**	The Wayans Bros.	Local programming	
The WB	Mid-summer	Sister, Sister	**The Steve Harvey Show** (R)	**The Jamie Foxx Show**	The Wayans Bros.	Local programming	
The WB	Late summer	Sister, Sister	**Smart Guy**	The Wayans Bros.	**The Steve Harvey Show** (R)	Local programming	

Note: On CBS, due to the effect of the debut delay of Ink on Monday, the first month of the new season on this night aired Almost Perfect at 8:30 p.m., followed by CBS Wednesday Movies at 9 p.m. The originally planned fall Wednesday lineup took shape at the end of October with Pearl taking over at 8:30 p.m., Almost Perfect moving to 9 p.m., Public Morals debuting at 9:30 p.m., and EZ Streets debuting at 10 p.m. This lasted for only one week in late October. CBS cancelled Public Morals after it aired for only one episode. This meant Almost Perfect would soon be cancelled. EZ Streets would be given a 2nd chance in the spring.

== Thursday ==
Network		8:00 p.m.	8:30 p.m.	9:00 p.m.	9:30 p.m.	10:00 p.m.	10:30 p.m.
ABC	Fall	High Incident		Murder One		Turning Point	
ABC	Winter	High Incident		The ABC Thursday Night Movie			
ABC	Late winter	High Incident		**Vital Signs**		Turning Point	
ABC	Summer	High Incident		Turning Point		ABC News programming	
CBS	Fall	Diagnosis: Murder		**Moloney**		48 Hours	
CBS	Summer	**Promised Land** (R)		Diagnosis: Murder (R)		48 Hours	
Fox		Martin	Living Single	New York Undercover		Local programming	
NBC	Fall	Friends (4/16.8) (Tied with The Naked Truth)	The Single Guy (8/14.1)	Seinfeld (2/20.5)	**Suddenly Susan** (3/17.0)	ER (1/21.2)	
NBC	Winter	Friends (4/16.8) (Tied with The Naked Truth)	The Single Guy (8/14.1)	Seinfeld (2/20.5)	The Naked Truth (4/16.8) (Tied with Friends)	ER (1/21.2)	
NBC	Late winter	Friends (4/16.8) (Tied with The Naked Truth)	**Suddenly Susan** (3/17.0)	Seinfeld (2/20.5)	The Naked Truth (4/16.8) (Tied with Friends)	Law & Order (27/10.8) (Tied with 3rd Rock from the Sun)	
NBC	Spring	Friends (4/16.8) (Tied with The Naked Truth)	**Suddenly Susan** (3/17.0)	Seinfeld (2/20.5)	**Fired Up** (6/16.5)	ER (1/21.2)	
NBC	Late spring	Friends (4/16.8) (Tied with The Naked Truth)	**Men Behaving Badly** (R)	Seinfeld (2/20.5)	**Suddenly Susan** (R)	ER (1/21.2)	
NBC	Summer	Friends (4/16.8) (Tied with The Naked Truth)	**Men Behaving Badly** (R)	Seinfeld (2/20.5)	3rd Rock from the Sun (R)	ER (1/21.2)	

== Friday ==
Network		8:00 PM	8:30 PM	9:00 PM	9:30 PM	10:00 PM	10:30 PM
ABC	Fall	Family Matters	**Sabrina the Teenage Witch**	**Clueless**	Boy Meets World	20/20 (12/12.8)	
ABC	Mid-fall	Family Matters	Boy Meets World	**Sabrina the Teenage Witch**	**Clueless**	20/20 (12/12.8)	
ABC	Late Winter	Family Matters	Boy Meets World	**Sabrina the Teenage Witch**	Step by Step	20/20 (12/12.8)	
ABC	Spring	Step by Step	Boy Meets World	**Sabrina the Teenage Witch**	**Clueless** (R)	20/20 (12/12.8)	
ABC	Summer	Step by Step	Boy Meets World	**Sabrina the Teenage Witch**	Hangin' with Mr. Cooper	20/20 (12/12.8)	
CBS	Fall	Dave's World	**Everybody Loves Raymond**	**Mr. & Mrs. Smith**		Nash Bridges	
CBS	Late fall	Dave's World	**Everybody Loves Raymond**	Special programming		Nash Bridges	
CBS	Winter	Dave's World	**Everybody Loves Raymond**	JAG		Nash Bridges	
CBS	Spring	JAG		**Orleans**		Nash Bridges	
CBS	Late spring	Dave's World	**Life... and Stuff**	JAG (R)		Nash Bridges	
CBS	Summer	**Ordinary Extraordinary**		JAG (R)		Nash Bridges	
Fox	Fall	Sliders		The X-Files (21/11.4) (Tied with Cosby)		Local programming	
Fox	Mid-fall	Sliders		**Millennium**		Local programming	
NBC	Fall	Unsolved Mysteries		Dateline NBC (30/10.5) (Tied with Chicago Hope and Cybill)		Homicide: Life on the Street	
NBC	Winter	Unsolved Mysteries		Dateline NBC (30/10.5) (Tied with Chicago Hope and Cybill)		**Crisis Center**	
NBC	Spring	Unsolved Mysteries		Dateline NBC (30/10.5) (Tied with Chicago Hope and Cybill)		Homicide: Life on the Street	
NBC	Late spring	Unsolved Mysteries		Dateline NBC (30/10.5) (Tied with Chicago Hope and Cybill)		**Profiler** (R)	
NBC	Summer	Unsolved Mysteries		Dateline NBC (30/10.5) (Tied with Chicago Hope and Cybill)		Homicide: Life on the Street (R)	

Note: CBS picked up JAG after NBC cancelled it due to low ratings and it became a success afterwards.

This is the last season of Family Matters and Step by Step and the only season of Clueless to air on ABC's TGIF block, until the following season, the former two shows were picked up by CBS and Clueless moved to UPN on Tuesdays.

== Saturday ==
Network		8:00 p.m.	8:30 p.m.	9:00 p.m.	9:30 p.m.	10:00 p.m.	10:30 p.m.
ABC	Fall	Second Noah		Coach	**Common Law**	**Relativity**	
ABC	Mid-fall	The ABC Saturday Night Movie				**Relativity**	
ABC	Winter	**Dangerous Minds**		The ABC Saturday Night Movie			
ABC	Spring	Lois & Clark: The New Adventures of Superman		**Leaving L.A.**		**Gun**	
ABC	Late spring	Family Matters (R)	Hangin' with Mr. Cooper	**Dangerous Minds** (R)		**Spy Game**	
ABC	Summer	Family Matters (R)	Hangin' with Mr. Cooper	Special programming		**The Practice** (R)	
CBS		Dr. Quinn, Medicine Woman		**Early Edition**		Walker, Texas Ranger (23/11.0) (Tied with Mad About You, Caroline in the City and The NBC Monday Movie)	
Fox	Fall	COPS	COPS (R)	Married... with Children	**Love and Marriage**	Local programming	
Fox	Mid-fall	COPS	COPS (R)	America's Most Wanted: America Fights Back		Local programming	
NBC	Fall	**Dark Skies**		**The Pretender**		**Profiler**	
NBC	Spring	Special programming		**The Pretender**		**Profiler**	
NBC	Summer	**The Pretender**		**NBC Saturday Night At The Movies**			

Note: America's Most Wanted would return in November at 9:00 on Fox. Married... with Children moved to Sundays at 7-8pm in November, Mondays at 9:30 in January, and Mondays at 9pm in February. Lawless which aired on March 27, 1997, replacing the second half of America's Most Wanted was canceled after one episode.

== By network ==
=== ABC ===
Returning series

- 20/20
- The ABC Monday Night Movie
- The ABC Sunday Night Movie
- The ABC Saturday Night Movie
- The ABC Thursday Night Movie
- America's Funniest Home Videos
- Boy Meets World
- Coach
- The Drew Carey Show
- Ellen
- Family Matters
- Grace Under Fire
- Hangin' with Mr. Cooper
- High Incident
- Home Improvement
- Lois & Clark: The New Adventures of Superman
- Monday Night Football
- Murder One
- NYPD Blue
- Primetime Live
- Roseanne
- Second Noah
- Step by Step
- Turning Point

New series

- **Arsenio**
- **Clueless**
- **Common Law**
- **Dangerous Minds**
- **Gun**
- **Leaving L.A.**
- **Life's Work**
- **The Practice**
- **Relativity**
- **Sabrina the Teenage Witch**
- **Soul Man**
- **Spin City**
- **Spy Game**
- **Townies**
- **Vital Signs**

Not returning from 1995-96

- Aliens in the Family
- Before They Were Stars
- Buddies
- Champs
- Charlie Grace
- The Commish
- The Dana Carvey Show
- The Faculty
- Hudson Street
- The Jeff Foxworthy Show (moved to NBC)
- The Marshal
- Maybe This Time
- The Monroes
- Muppets Tonight
- The Naked Truth (moved to NBC)
- World's Funniest Videos

=== CBS ===
Returning series

- 48 Hours
- 60 Minutes
- Almost Perfect
- CBS Sunday Movie
- Chicago Hope
- Cybill
- Dave's World
- Diagnosis Murder
- Dr. Quinn, Medicine Woman
- JAG (moved from NBC)
- Murphy Brown
- The Nanny
- Nash Bridges
- Touched by an Angel
- Walker, Texas Ranger

New series

- **Cosby**
- **Early Edition**
- **Everybody Loves Raymond**
- **EZ Streets**
- **Feds**
- **Ink**
- **Life... and Stuff**
- **Mr. & Mrs. Smith**
- **Moloney**
- **Orleans**
- **Pearl**
- **Promised Land**
- **Public Morals**
- **Temporarily Yours**

Not returning from 1995-96

- American Gothic
- Bless This House
- The Bonnie Hunt Show
- Can't Hurry Love
- Central Park West
- The Client
- Courthouse
- Due South
- Dweebs
- High Society
- The Louie Show
- Matt Waters
- Murder, She Wrote
- My Guys
- Picket Fences
- Rescue 911
- New York News

=== Fox ===
Returning series

- America's Most Wanted: America Fights Back
- Beverly Hills, 90210
- Cops
- Fox Tuesday Night Movie
- Living Single
- Married... with Children
- Martin
- Melrose Place
- Ned and Stacey
- New York Undercover
- Party of Five
- The Simpsons
- Sliders
- The X-Files

New series

- **Beyond Belief: Fact or Fiction**
- **Big Deal**
- **King of the Hill**
- **Lawless**
- **Love and Marriage**
- **Lush Life**
- **Millennium**
- **Pacific Palisades**
- **Party Girl**
- **Pauly**
- **Roar**

Not returning from 1995-96

- The Crew
- Encounters: The Hidden Truth
- Kindred: The Embraced
- L.A. Firefighters
- The Last Frontier
- Local Heroes
- Misery Loves Company
- Partners
- The Preston Episodes
- Profit
- Saturday Night Special
- The Show
- Space: Above and Beyond
- Strange Luck
- Too Something
- What's So Funny?

=== NBC ===
Returning series

- 3rd Rock from the Sun
- Boston Common
- Caroline in the City
- Dateline NBC
- ER
- Frasier
- Friends
- Homicide: Life on the Street
- The Jeff Foxworthy Show (moved from ABC)
- The John Larroquette Show
- Law & Order
- Mad About You
- The Naked Truth (moved from ABC)
- NBC Sunday Night Movie
- The NBC Monday Movie
- NewsRadio
- Seinfeld
- The Single Guy
- Unsolved Mysteries
- Wings

New series

- **Chicago Sons**
- **Crisis Center**
- **Dark Skies**
- **Fired Up**
- **Just Shoot Me!**
- **Men Behaving Badly**
- **Mr. Rhodes**
- **The Pretender**
- **NBC Saturday Night at the Movies**
- **Prince Street**
- **Profiler**
- **Something So Right**
- **Suddenly Susan**

Not returning from 1995-96

- Brotherly Love (moved to The WB)
- The Fresh Prince of Bel-Air (returning on HBO Max in 2020)
- The Home Court
- Hope and Gloria
- In the House (moved to UPN)
- JAG (moved to CBS)
- Malibu Shores
- The Pursuit of Happiness
- seaQuest 2032
- Sisters

=== UPN ===
Returning series

- In the House (moved from NBC)
- Moesha
- The Sentinel
- Star Trek: Voyager

New series

- **The Burning Zone**
- **Goode Behavior**
- **Homeboys in Outer Space**
- **Malcolm & Eddie**
- **Social Studies**
- **Sparks**

Not returning from 1995-96

- Deadly Games
- Live Shot
- Minor Adjustments
- Nowhere Man
- The Paranormal Borderline
- Swift Justice

=== The WB ===
Returning series

- Brotherly Love (moved from NBC)
- Kirk
- The Parent 'Hood
- Savannah
- Sister, Sister
- Unhappily Ever After
- The Wayans Bros.

New series

- **7th Heaven**
- **Buffy the Vampire Slayer**
- **The Jamie Foxx Show**
- **Life with Roger**
- **Nick Freno: Licensed Teacher**
- **Smart Guy**
- **The Steve Harvey Show**

Not returning from 1995-96

- Cleghorne!
- First Time Out
- Pinky and the Brain (moved to Kids' WB in daytime)
- Simon
