= 1970–71 United States network television schedule =

The following is the 1970–71 network television schedule for the three major English language commercial broadcast networks in the United States. The schedule covers primetime hours from September 1970 through August 1971. The schedule is followed by a list per network of returning series, new series, and series cancelled after the 1969–70 season. All times are Eastern and Pacific, with certain exceptions, such as Monday Night Football.

This was the first time that the top rated show of the season aired on ABC.

New fall series are highlighted in bold.

Each of the 30 highest-rated shows is listed with its rank and rating as determined by Nielsen Media Research.

Yellow indicates the programs in the top 10 for the season.
Cyan indicates the programs in the top 20 for the season.
Magenta indicates the programs in the top 30 for the season.

PBS, the Public Broadcasting Service, was in operation by October 1970; however, schedules were set by each affiliated station.

In April 1970, Congress passed a law banning the advertising of cigarettes on television and radio, effective January 2, 1971.

This season would be the last one for the traditional 3½-hour prime time schedule.

== Sunday ==
Network		7:00 PM	7:30 PM	8:00 PM	8:30 PM	9:00 PM	9:30 PM	10:00 PM	10:30 PM
ABC	Fall	**The Young Rebels**		The F.B.I. (10/23.0)		The ABC Sunday Night Movie (28/19.7)			
ABC	Winter	Local		The F.B.I. (10/23.0)		The ABC Sunday Night Movie (28/19.7)			
CBS	Fall	Lassie	Hogan's Heroes	The Ed Sullivan Show		The Glen Campbell Goodtime Hour		**The Tim Conway Comedy Hour**	
CBS	December	Lassie	Hogan's Heroes	The Ed Sullivan Show		The Glen Campbell Goodtime Hour		The Honeymooners	
CBS	Summer	Lassie	Hogan's Heroes	**The CBS Sunday Night Movie**				**The Ice Palace**	
CBS	August	Lassie	Animal World	**Comedy Playhouse**	**The Sonny & Cher Comedy Hour**		**Six Wives of Henry VIII**		
NBC	Fall	Wild Kingdom	The Wonderful World of Disney (13/22.4) (Tied with Rowan & Martin's Laugh-In)		The Bill Cosby Show	Bonanza (9/23.9)		The Bold Ones: The New Doctors / The Lawyers / **The Senator**	
NBC	Summer	Local	The Wonderful World of Disney (13/22.4) (Tied with Rowan & Martin's Laugh-In)		The Red Skelton Show	Bonanza (9/23.9)		The Bold Ones: The New Doctors / The Lawyers / **The Senator**	

NOTE: On CBS, Comedy Playhouse was an anthology series composed of unsold television pilots.

== Monday ==
Network		7:30 PM	8:00 PM	8:30 PM	9:00 PM	9:30 PM	10:00 PM	10:30 PM
ABC	Fall	**The Young Lawyers**		**The Silent Force**	**Monday Night Football**			
ABC	Winter	Let's Make a Deal	The Newlywed Game	**The Reel Game**	The ABC Monday Night Movie			
ABC	Spring	Let's Make a Deal	The Newlywed Game	**It Was a Very Good Year**	The ABC Monday Night Movie			
CBS	Fall	Gunsmoke (5/25.5)		Here's Lucy (3/26.1)	Mayberry R.F.D. (15/22.3)	The Doris Day Show (20/20.7)	The Carol Burnett Show (25/19.8) (Tied with The Partridge Family and NBC Monday Night at the Movies)	
CBS	Summer	Gunsmoke (5/25.5)		The Lucy Show (R)	Mayberry R.F.D. (15/22.3)	The Doris Day Show (20/20.7)	Suspense Playhouse	
CBS	Follow-up	Gunsmoke (5/25.5)		The Lucy Show (R)	Mayberry R.F.D. (15/22.3)	The Doris Day Show (20/20.7)	**The CBS Newcomers**	
NBC	Fall	The Red Skelton Show	Rowan & Martin's Laugh-In (13/22.4) (Tied with The Wonderful World of Disney)		NBC Monday Night at the Movies (25/19.8) (Tied with The Carol Burnett Show and The Partridge Family)			
NBC	Spring	**From a Bird's Eye View**	Rowan & Martin's Laugh-In (13/22.4) (Tied with The Wonderful World of Disney)		NBC Monday Night at the Movies (25/19.8) (Tied with The Carol Burnett Show and The Partridge Family)			
NBC	Summer	**From a Bird's Eye View**	NBC Comedy Theater		NBC Monday Night at the Movies (25/19.8) (Tied with The Carol Burnett Show and The Partridge Family)			
NBC	Follow-up	Specials	Monday Night Baseball					

Note: NBC Comedy Theater featured repeats of Bob Hope Presents the Chrysler Theatre, with new introductions by Jack Kelly.

== Tuesday ==
Network		7:30 PM	8:00 PM	8:30 PM	9:00 PM	9:30 PM	10:00 PM	10:30 PM
ABC		The Mod Squad (11/22.7)		ABC Movie of the Week (6/25.1)			Marcus Welby, M.D. (1/29.6)	
CBS	Fall	The Beverly Hillbillies	Green Acres	Hee Haw (16/21.4)		To Rome With Love	CBS News Hour / 60 Minutes	
CBS	Winter	The Beverly Hillbillies	Green Acres	Hee Haw (16/21.4)		**All in the Family**	CBS News Hour / 60 Minutes	
CBS	Summer	The Beverly Hillbillies	Green Acres	Cimarron Strip (R)			Specials	
NBC	Fall	**The Don Knotts Show**		Julia	NBC Tuesday Night at the Movies / First Tuesday			
NBC	Winter	Julia	**The Don Knotts Show**		NBC Tuesday Night at the Movies / First Tuesday			
NBC	Summer	The Bill Cosby Show	**The Don Knotts Show**		NBC Tuesday Night at the Movies / First Tuesday			
NBC	Follow-up	The Bill Cosby Show	**Make Your Own Kind of Music**		NBC Tuesday Night at the Movies / First Tuesday			

== Wednesday ==
Network		7:30 PM	8:00 PM	8:30 PM	9:00 PM	9:30 PM	10:00 PM	10:30 PM
ABC	Fall	The Courtship of Eddie's Father	**Danny Thomas in Make Room for Granddaddy**	Room 222	The Johnny Cash Show		**Dan August**	
ABC	Winter	The Courtship of Eddie's Father	Room 222	**The Smith Family** (21/20.6)	The Johnny Cash Show		**The Young Lawyers**	
ABC	Summer	The Courtship of Eddie's Father	Room 222	**The Smith Family** (21/20.6)	Love on a Rooftop (R)	**The Immortal**		**NFL Action**
CBS	Fall	**Storefront Lawyers**		The Governor & J.J.	Medical Center (8/24.5)		Hawaii Five-O (7/25.0)	
CBS	Winter	**Men at Law**		To Rome with Love	Medical Center (8/24.5)		Hawaii Five-O (7/25.0)	
NBC	Fall	The Men from Shiloh (18/21.2)			Kraft Music Hall		**Four in One: McCloud / San Francisco International Airport / Night Gallery / The Psychiatrist**	
NBC	Summer	The Men from Shiloh (18/21.2)			The Des O'Connor Show		**Four in One: McCloud / San Francisco International Airport / Night Gallery / The Psychiatrist**	

Notes: Love on a Rooftop consisted of reruns of the series, which originally aired during the 1966-1967 season. The Men from Shiloh formerly was entitled The Virginian.

== Thursday ==
Network		7:30 PM	8:00 PM	8:30 PM	9:00 PM	9:30 PM	10:00 PM	10:30 PM
ABC	Fall	**Matt Lincoln**		Bewitched	**Barefoot in the Park**	**The Odd Couple**	**The Immortal**	
ABC	Winter	**Alias Smith and Jones**		Bewitched	**Danny Thomas in Make Room for Granddaddy**	**Dan August**		Local
CBS	Fall	Family Affair	The Jim Nabors Hour (29/19.5)		The CBS Thursday Night Movies (30/19.3)			
CBS	Summer	Family Affair	Lancer (R)		The CBS Thursday Night Movies (30/19.3)			
NBC	Fall	**The Flip Wilson Show** (2/27.9)		Ironside (4/25.7)		**Nancy**	The Dean Martin Show (24/20.0)	
NBC	Winter	**The Flip Wilson Show** (2/27.9)		Ironside (4/25.7)		Adam-12 (12/22.6)	The Dean Martin Show (24/20.0)	
NBC	Summer	NBC Action Playhouse		Ironside (4/25.7)		Adam-12 (12/22.6)	The Dean Martin Summer Show Starring Your Host Vic Damone (R)	

Notes: On CBS, Lancer consisted of reruns of the 1968–1970 series. On NBC, NBC Action Playhouse featured repeats of Bob Hope Presents the Chrysler Theatre, with new introductions by Peter Marshall, and The Dean Martin Summer Show Starring Your Host Vic Damone consisted entirely of reruns of the show of the same name from the summer of 1967.

== Friday ==
Network		7:30 PM	8:00 PM	8:30 PM	9:00 PM	9:30 PM	10:00 PM	10:30 PM
ABC	Fall	The Brady Bunch	Nanny and the Professor	**The Partridge Family** (25/19.8) (Tied with The Carol Burnett Show and NBC Monday Night at the Movies)	That Girl	Love, American Style	This Is Tom Jones	
ABC	Winter	The Brady Bunch	Nanny and the Professor	**The Partridge Family** (25/19.8) (Tied with The Carol Burnett Show and NBC Monday Night at the Movies)	That Girl	**The Odd Couple**	Love, American Style	
CBS	Fall	**The Interns**		**Headmaster**	The CBS Friday Night Movies			
CBS	Winter	**The Interns**		**The New Andy Griffith Show**	The CBS Friday Night Movies			
CBS	Summer	**The Interns**		**Headmaster** (R)	The CBS Friday Night Movies			
NBC	Fall	The High Chaparral		The Name of the Game			Bracken's World	
NBC	Winter	The High Chaparral		The Name of the Game			**Strange Report**	

== Saturday ==
Network		7:30 PM	8:00 PM	8:30 PM	9:00 PM	9:30 PM	10:00 PM	10:30 PM
ABC	Fall	Let's Make a Deal	The Newlywed Game	The Lawrence Welk Show		**The Most Deadly Game**		Local
ABC	Winter	The Lawrence Welk Show		**The Pearl Bailey Show**		Local		
ABC	Summer	The Lawrence Welk Show		**The Val Doonican Show**		Local		
CBS		Mission: Impossible		My Three Sons (19/20.8)	**Arnie**	**The Mary Tyler Moore Show** (22/20.3)	Mannix (17/21.3)	
NBC	Fall	The Andy Williams Show		Adam-12 (12/22.6)	NBC Saturday Night at the Movies (23/20.1)			
NBC	Winter	The Andy Williams Show		NBC Saturday Night at the Movies (23/20.1)				Local

== By network ==
=== ABC ===
**Returning Series**

- The ABC Monday Night Movie
- ABC Movie of the Week
- The ABC Sunday Night Movie
- Bewitched
- The Brady Bunch
- The Courtship of Eddie's Father
- The F.B.I.
- The Johnny Cash Show
- The Lawrence Welk Show
- Let's Make a Deal
- Love, American Style
- Marcus Welby, M.D.
- The Mod Squad
- Nanny and the Professor
- The Newlywed Game
- Room 222
- That Girl
- This Is Tom Jones

**New Series**

- **Alias Smith and Jones**
- **Barefoot in the Park**
- **Dan August**
- **Danny Thomas in Make Room for Granddaddy**
- **The Immortal**
- **It Was a Very Good Year** *
- **Matt Lincoln**
- **Monday Night Football**
- **The Most Deadly Game**
- **The Odd Couple**
- **The Partridge Family**
- **The Pearl Bailey Show** *
- **The Reel Game** *
- **The Silent Force**
- **The Smith Family** *
- **The Val Doonican Show** *
- **The Young Lawyers**
- **The Young Rebels**

Not returning from 1969–70:

- Animal World (moved to CBS)
- The Engelbert Humperdinck Show
- The Flying Nun
- The Ghost & Mrs. Muir
- Harold Robbins' The Survivors
- Here Come the Brides
- The Hollywood Palace
- It Takes a Thief
- Jimmy Durante Presents the Lennon Sisters
- Johnny Cash Presents the Everly Brothers Show
- Land of the Giants
- Mr. Deeds Goes to Town
- The Music Scene
- The New People
- Now
- Paris 7000
- Pat Paulsen's Half a Comedy Hour
- The Smothers Brothers Show

=== CBS ===
**Returning Series**

- 60 Minutes
- Animal World (moved from ABC)
- The Beverly Hillbillies
- The Carol Burnett Show
- CBS Thursday Night Movie
- The CBS Friday Night Movies
- The Doris Day Show
- The Ed Sullivan Show
- Family Affair
- The Glen Campbell Goodtime Hour
- The Governor & J.J.
- Green Acres
- Gunsmoke
- Hawaii Five-O
- Hee Haw
- Here's Lucy
- Hogan's Heroes
- The Jim Nabors Hour
- Lassie
- Mannix
- Mayberry R.F.D.
- Medical Center
- Mission: Impossible
- My Three Sons
- Suspense Playhouse
- To Rome with Love

**New Series**

- **All in the Family** *
- **Arnie**
- **The CBS Newcomers** *
- **Comedy Playhouse** *
- **Headmaster**
- **The Ice Palace** *
- **The Interns**
- **The Mary Tyler Moore Show**
- **The New Andy Griffith Show** *
- **The Six Wives of Henry VIII** *
- **The Sonny & Cher Comedy Hour** *
- **Storefront Lawyers**
- **The Tim Conway Comedy Hour**

Not returning from 1969–70:

- The 21st Century
- CBS News Adventure
- CBS Playhouse
- Comedy Tonight
- Get Smart
- The Good Guys
- The Jackie Gleason Show
- Lancer
- The Leslie Uggams Show
- Petticoat Junction
- The Red Skelton Show (moved to NBC)
- The Tim Conway Show
- Where's Huddles?

=== NBC ===
**Returning Series**

- Adam-12
- The Andy Williams Show
- The Bill Cosby Show
- Bonanza
- The Bold Ones
- Bracken's World
- Columbo
- The Dean Martin Show
- The Des O'Connor Show
- The High Chaparral
- Ironside
- Jambo
- Julia
- Kraft Music Hall
- The Men from Shiloh
- Monday Night Baseball
- The Name of the Game
- NBC Action Playhouse
- NBC Comedy Theater
- NBC Monday Night at the Movies
- The NBC Mystery Movie
- NBC Saturday Night at the Movies
- Night Gallery
- The Red Skelton Show (moved from CBS)
- Rowan & Martin's Laugh-In
- Strange Report
- Wild Kingdom
- The Wonderful World of Disney

**New Series**

- **The Don Knotts Show**
- **The Flip Wilson Show**
- **Four in One**
- **From a Bird's Eye View** *
- **Make Your Own Kind of Music** *
- **McCloud**
- **Nancy**
- **The Psychiatrist** *
- **San Francisco International Airport**

Not returning from 1969–70:

- Andy Williams Presents Ray Stevens
- Daniel Boone
- Dean Martin Presents the Golddiggers in London
- The Debbie Reynolds Show
- Dragnet 1970
- I Dream of Jeannie
- Letters to Laugh-In
- My World and Welcome to It
- Then Came Bronson

Note: The * indicates that the program was introduced in midseason.
