= Porch sitting =

Act of sitting on a front porch to relax, socialize, or observe

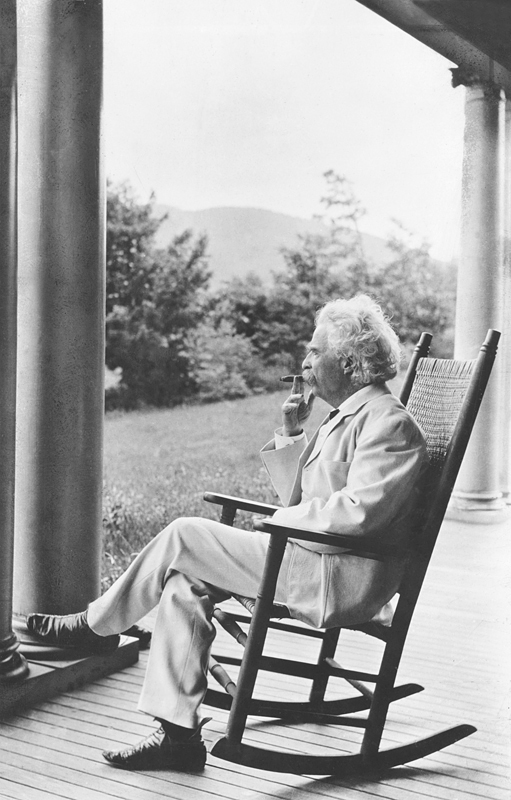
Mark Twain sitting on a porch

Porch sitting, i.e., sitting on a front porch or stoop, usually of a private residence is a leisure activity which can be a direct or indirect form of social interaction. The activity is a staple of most urban areas in the United States and helps contribute to a lively atmosphere for the people sitting and also for passers-by. It is most common during good weather, especially on warm summer nights and weekends.

Porch sitting was once considered to be a status symbol.

As well as being a good way to connect with neighbors, it is also an important form of community security by helping to prevent crime. Front porches were originally mandated in the planned community of Seaside, Florida, as a way to reduce air conditioning usage. Its planners perceived an enhanced sense of community and front porches subsequently became an important element in the New Urbanism movement. During the summer of 2006, All Things Considered broadcast a series of stories dedicated to the role of the front porch in American life and literature.

There are now thousands of (tongue-in-cheek) Professional Porch Sitters Unions in all 50 U.S. states and at least three other countries.

== Sitting equipment ==
A "lawn or porch chair" as advertised in the Sears Roebuck catalogue of 1897.

Sitting equipment varies greatly across cultures and historical periods, reflecting the diverse uses and social meanings of these everyday objects.

- In Brazilian fishing households, stools are commonly used, reflecting a pragmatic approach to sitting furniture. They are often placed in communal areas like kitchens or verandas, serving as the heart of family and social interactions.
- Rocking chairs are a common sight on porches, especially in regions like northern Georgia. They not only provide a relaxing seating option but also contribute to the culture and traditions associated with porch sitting.
- Porch swings offer a relaxing and communal seating option, commonly found in many households. They add a dynamic and cozy aspect to porches, allowing for leisurely movement and socializing.

== Sociology ==
Some see a potential downside of sitting on porches: the intrusiveness of porch-based surveillance.

== Decline ==
On hot summer days, it was formerly cooler out on the porch than it was inside the house. Air conditioning has thus replaced porch sitting and enabled people to socialize in the comfort of their homes, although porch sitting is still common in areas in which the climate is warm.

Other causes of a decline of porch sitting are television, which provides other entertaining sights, and the motor car, which made street views noisier and unpleasant.

== In popular culture ==
"Porch-sitters" form a recognized group in marketing and in literature.

Henry Church, an aged ex-British soldier from the American Revolutionary War, was noted for his porch sitting in sight of the train station. The town of Hundred, West Virginia, was then named after him, as he was called "Old Hundred."

The Don Knotts Show had a regular feature, The Front Porch, in which the host and his guest would sit in rocking chairs on a porch and talk philosophically. When Knotts played Barney Fife on The Andy Griffith Show, porch sitting was often incorporated into the sitcom's script. Another television series which featured Southern porch sitting, albeit in a more rural setting, was the family drama The Waltons.

The ethnic slur "porch monkey" is an insinuation that African Americans spend excessive amounts of time porch sitting.

In the film Friday, the main characters spend most of their day porch sitting.

The American sitcom 227 often featured main characters having conversations on the stoop of a Washington, D.C., apartment building. One of the featurettes in the series DVD set is titled "Stories from the Stoop".

== Bibliography ==
- Jane Jacobs (February 1993) [1961]. The Death and Life of Great American Cities (Modern Library (hardcover) ed.). New York: Random House. ISBN 0-679-60047-7. This edition includes a new foreword written by the author.
