= The Chicago Teddy Bears =

- Genre: Sitcom
- Created by: R.S. Allen & Harvey Bullock
- Directed by: Norman Tokar; Leslie H. Martinson; Gary Nelson
- Starring: Ann Sothern (pilot only); Dean Jones; Jamie Farr; Art Metrano; Marvin Kaplan; Mickey Shaughnessy; Huntz Hall; John Banner
- Theme music composer: Jerry Fielding
- Composer: Jerry Fielding
- Country of origin: United States
- Original language: English
- No. of seasons: 1
- No. of episodes: 13

Production
- Producers: Jerry Thorpe; Hy Averback
- Camera setup: Multi-camera
- Running time: 22–24 minutes
- Production companies: Equinox Productions; Dean Jones Productions; Warner Bros. Television

Original release
- Network: CBS
- Release: September 17 – December 10, 1971

The Chicago Teddy Bears is an American sitcom that aired on CBS. The series was part of the network's 1971 fall lineup, premiering on September 17, 1971.

== Synopsis ==
Unlike other shows set in Prohibition-era Chicago, The Chicago Teddy Bears was a sitcom. Any threats of violence were inferential rather than overt.

The main characters were Linc McCray (Dean Jones) and his Uncle Latzi (John Banner), partners in a speakeasy. A small-time gangster named "Big" Nick Marr (Art Metrano) wants to take it over. Marr is McCray's cousin and Latzi's nephew; the naive Latzi finds it hard to believe his nephew could be anything but a fine boy. However, Marvin the bookkeeper (Marvin Kaplan) and Linc's inept bodyguards, especially Duke (Jamie Farr), are very frightened of Marr.

The series was intended as a comeback vehicle for Ann Sothern, whose last regular role had been as the voice of My Mother the Car. She played a street flower vendor in the pilot and was meant to be a mediator between McCray and Marr. However, CBS wrote her out of the actual series.

The series received low ratings and was cancelled by CBS after only three months on the air. It ranked 70th out of 78 shows that season with an average 11.8 rating.

== Episodes ==
No.	Title	Directed by	Written by	Original release date
1	"Tender Loving Kindness"	Unknown	Unknown	September 17, 1971
Linc and Uncle Latzi outsmart Big Nick over the hiring of Rudy Vallee's band for a club date.
2	"Nick's Sister"	Unknown	Unknown	September 24, 1971
When the unsuspecting bridegroom that Big Nick has found to marry his unattractive sister leaves the wedding scene, Nick puts pressure on Linc to find a suitable successor.
3	"Mr. Suave"	Unknown	Unknown	October 1, 1971
A notorious gang leader from Detroit wants protection money if Linc and Uncle Latzi want to keep their speakeasy flourishing.
4	"The Alderman"	Leslie H. Martinson	Harvey Bullock & R.S. Allen	October 8, 1971
Big Nick plans to expand his "protection" business by running for alderman.
5	"The Big Grab"	Unknown	Unknown	October 15, 1971
Big Nick cons Uncle Latzi into buying the management of a prize fighter sight unseen.
6	"A Horse of Another Color"	Unknown	Unknown	October 22, 1971
A gangland tyrant arrives in Chicago and strikes terror into the heart of everyone, including Big Nick.
7	"Linc Minds the Baby"	Unknown	Unknown	October 29, 1971
Uncle Latzi agrees to take care of a baby whose parents are being deported, but Big Nick has control of all the local laundries, which means no clean diapers for the baby.
8	"The Big Kisser"	Unknown	Unknown	November 5, 1971
Uncle Latzi's old-world habit of kissing his friends leads Big Nick to worry.
9	"The Spy"	Unknown	Unknown	November 12, 1971
Linc decides to pipe beer in under the street and Uncle Latzi gives it away.
10	"Billy the Kid"	Unknown	Unknown	November 19, 1971
A billy goat full of dynamite comes close to permanently settling the feud between Linc and Big Nick.
11	"The Auction"	Unknown	Unknown	November 26, 1971
A forger is called upon to beat Big Nick at his own game--lying, cheating and stealing.
12	"Annie Get Your Cue"	Unknown	Unknown	December 3, 1971
Linc and Uncle Latzi's speakeasy business is in a terrible position with Nick threatening to foreclose on the mortgage.
13	"The Rivalry"	Unknown	Unknown	December 10, 1971
A neighborhood flower vendor and a parish priest enliven the battle between Linc and Big Nick over ownership of the speakeasy.

== Bibliography ==
- Tim Brooks and Earle Marsh, The Complete Directory to Prime Time Network and Cable TV Shows 1946–Present, Ninth edition (New York: Ballantine Books, 2007) ISBN 978-0-345-49773-4
