= The Man and the City =

American television drama, 1971 to 1972

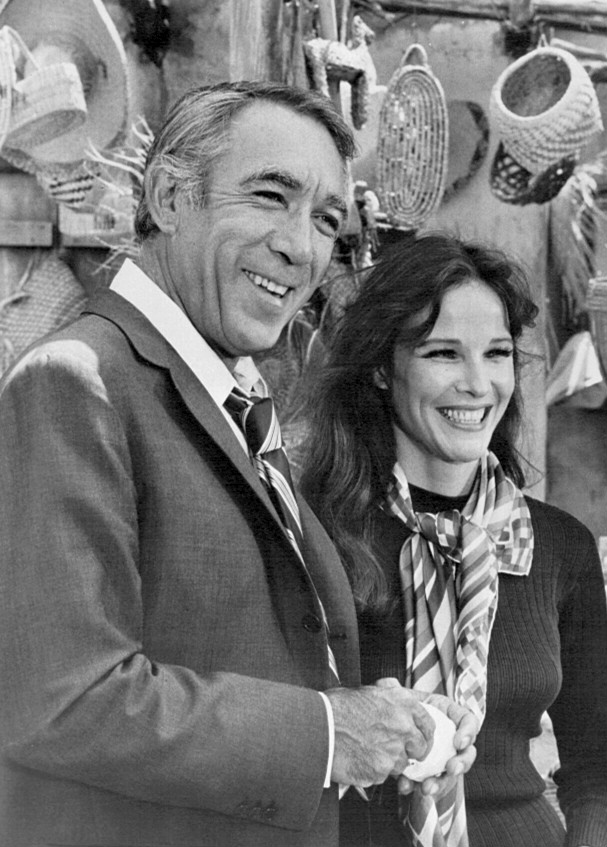
- Anthony Quinn and Janice Rule, 1971
- Created by: Howard Rodman
- Starring: Anthony Quinn
- Composer: Alex North
- Country of origin: United States
- Original language: English
- No. of seasons: 1
- No. of episodes: 15

Production
- Running time: 60 minutes
- Production company: Universal Television

Original release
- Network: ABC
- Release: September 15, 1971 – January 5, 1972

The Man and the City is an American drama series which aired on ABC as part of its Fall 1971 lineup from September 15, 1971, to January 5, 1972.

Anthony Quinn starred as Thomas Jefferson Alcala, the long-term Hispanic mayor of a major but unidentified city in the Southwestern United States (location shooting was done in Albuquerque, New Mexico). Alcala's WASP deputy, Andy Hays, was portrayed by Mike Farrell. Hays' main role was to make sure that the well-meaning Mayor Alcala did not become so engrossed in aiding individual constituents with their problems that he failed to address the issues facing the city as a whole.

Despite the vast talents of Quinn and the earnest Farrell, The Man and the City was a Nielsen ratings failure, finishing third in its Wednesday night time slot against the hit private eye show Mannix and the Rod Serling anthology series Night Gallery, and was cancelled at midseason.

== Cast ==
- Anthony Quinn ... Thomas Jefferson Alcala
- Mike Farrell ... Andy Hayes
- Mala Powers ... Marian Crane
- Carmen Zapata ... Josefina

== Episodes ==
No.	Title	Directed by	Written by	Original release date
1	"Hands of Love"	Unknown	Unknown	September 15, 1971
2	"100 Blank Pages"	Unknown	Unknown	September 22, 1971
3	"I Should Have Let Him Die"	Unknown	Unknown	September 29, 1971
4	"A Very Special Girl"	Unknown	Unknown	October 6, 1971
5	"Reprisal"	Unknown	Unknown	October 13, 1971
6	"Disaster on Turner Street"	Unknown	Unknown	October 20, 1971
7	"The Handwriting on the Door"	Unknown	Unknown	October 27, 1971
8	"Running Scared"	Unknown	Unknown	November 3, 1971
9	"The Deadly Fountain"	Unknown	Unknown	November 10, 1971
10	"Run for Daylight"	Unknown	Unknown	November 17, 1971
11	"The Cross-Country Man"	Unknown	Unknown	December 1, 1971
12	"Pipe Me a Loving Tune"	Unknown	Unknown	December 8, 1971
13	"The Girls in Truck 7"	Unknown	Unknown	December 15, 1971
14	"Jennifer"	Unknown	Unknown	December 29, 1971
15	"Diagnosis: Corruption"	Unknown	Unknown	January 5, 1972

== Awards ==
Daniel Petrie won a Directors Guild of America Award in 1972 for Outstanding Directorial Achievement in Dramatic Series - Night for the episode "Hands of Love." That same episode earned Petrie an Emmy nomination for Outstanding Directorial Achievement in Drama - A Single Program of a Series with Continuing Characters and/or Theme.
