= The Don Knotts Show =

- Genre: Variety show
- Directed by: Norman Abbott
- Presented by: Don Knotts
- Country of origin: United States
- Original language: English
- No. of seasons: 1
- No. of episodes: 24

Production
- Running time: 60 minutes
- Production company: Tomka Productions Inc.

Original release
- Network: NBC
- Release: 15 September 1970 – 6 July 1971

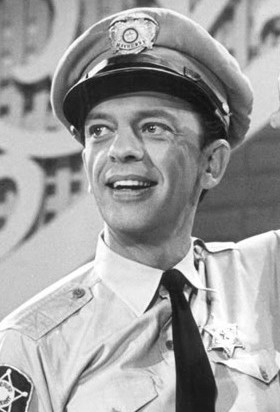
Don Knotts in 1965

The Don Knotts Show was a variety program aired by NBC as part of its 1970–71 lineup.

Long relegated to the role of sidekick, which he had portrayed for many years in several television series and films, Don Knotts was the headliner here. Each week, his guests and he put on standard TV variety fare of the era. Two recurring features were a skit about the effort involved in putting a weekly television series on the air, much in the spirit of The Jack Benny Show, and The Front Porch, in which Don and a guest would sit in rocking chairs and quietly discuss their philosophies of life. Notable regulars in his cast included Elaine Joyce and Gary Burghoff.
