= San Francisco International Airport (TV series) =

1970–1971 television series

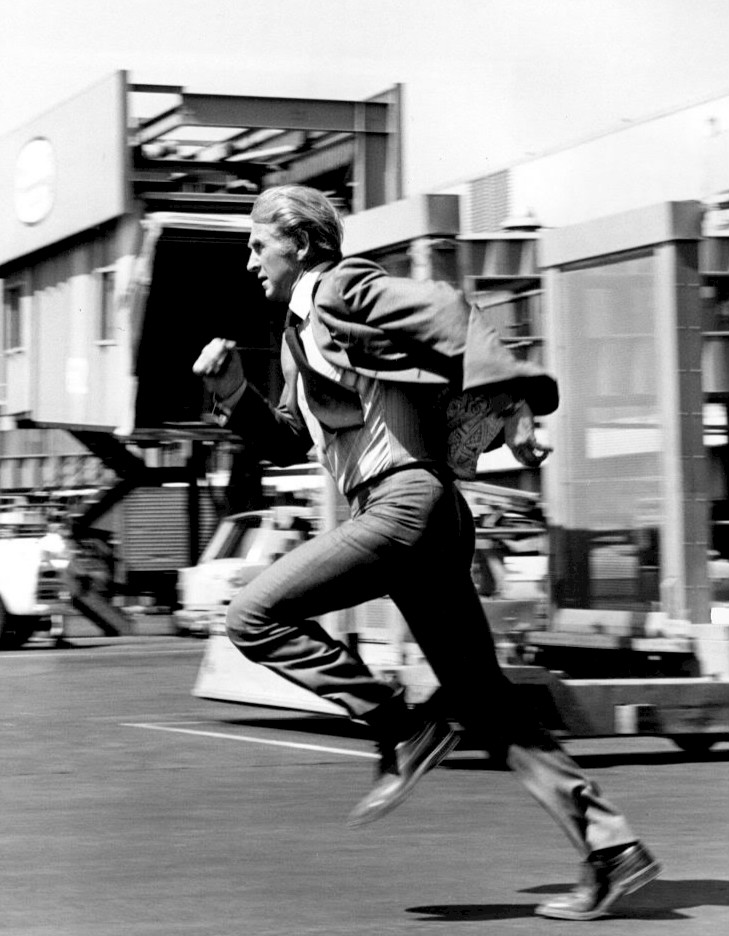
- Lloyd Bridges in the "Emergency Alert" episode.
- Starring: Lloyd Bridges; Barbara Werle; Clu Gulager
- Country of origin: United States
- Original language: English
- No. of episodes: 7, including the pilot movie

Production
- Running time: 60 minutes

Original release
- Network: NBC
- Release: September 29, 1970
- Release: October 28 – December 2, 1970

San Francisco International Airport is a television drama that was originally aired in the United States by NBC as a part of its 1970–71 wheel series Four in One.

The series starred Lloyd Bridges as Jim Conrad, the manager of the gigantic San Francisco International Airport, which at the time of the series aired was said to handle more than 15,000,000 passengers annually and have roughly 35,000 employees. Bob Hatten (Clu Gulager) was his chief of security, an important role at a time when security was beginning to emerge as a real-life major issue in air transport. June (Barbara Werle) was Conrad's secretary. Airport situations drawn from real life were addressed, such as protesting demonstrators, mechanical malfunctions, and similar problems.

The pilot, also called San Francisco International Airport or simply San Francisco International, had aired as a TV movie and starred Pernell Roberts in the role of Jim Conrad. The network ordered six series episodes, but only with the stipulation that Bridges play the role instead of Roberts.

San Francisco International Airport was the second program in the Four in One rotation, after McCloud. The six episodes were first shown in succession from late October until early December 1970 and were then replaced in the Wednesday night 10 pm Eastern time slot by Night Gallery. Once Night Gallery and The Psychiatrist had completed their first runs, episodes of all four series were rerun interspersed with one another. Night Gallery was picked up for the next season as a stand-alone series and McCloud was renewed as an element in a new wheel series, NBC Mystery Movie, but San Francisco International Airport and The Psychiatrist were cancelled, with no more episodes ordered beyond the initial six.

The pilot, starring Roberts, received mediocre reviews and was largely forgotten for years, but it was eventually rescued from obscurity by becoming the subject of a sixth-season episode of Mystery Science Theater 3000 in 1994.

== Episode list ==
No.	Title	Directed by	Written by	Original release date
0	"San Francisco International"	John Llewellyn Moxey	William Read Woodfield and Allan Balter	September 29, 1970
1	"Emergency Alert"	Unknown	Unknown	October 28, 1970
2	"We Once Came Home to Parades"	Unknown	Unknown	November 4, 1970
3	"Hostage"	Unknown	Unknown	November 11, 1970
4	"Crisis"	Unknown	Unknown	November 18, 1970
5	"Supersonic Transport"	Unknown	Unknown	November 25, 1970
6	"The High Cost of Nightmares"	Unknown	Unknown	December 2, 1970

== Mystery Science Theater 3000 episode ==
The Mystery Science Theater 3000 (MST3K) presentation of the series pilot first aired on November 19, 1994, as episode number 614. In The Mystery Science Theater 3000 Amazing Colossal Episode Guide, writer Paul Chaplin remarked on star Pernell Roberts's "astounding pomposity and self-absorption ... Pernell struts and preens like a balding cock-of-the-walk." Three of the episode's non-movie segments focus on host Mike Nelson's imitation of Urkel from the ABC sitcom Family Matters, which Chaplin admits many found to be "an odd decision".

The episode finished number 99 out of 177 episodes in a poll voted upon by MST3K season-11 Kickstarter backers. Writer Jim Vorel ranked the episode number 109 out of 191 MST3K episodes, saying, "The entire thing is a relentless barrage of wacky subplots. ... There’s so much going on the entire time that Mike and the Bots can barely keep up."

The MST3K version of the pilot for San Francisco International was included as part of the Mystery Science Theater 3000, Volume XXXII DVD collection, released by Shout! Factory on March 24, 2015. The other episodes in the four-disc set include Space Travelers (episode 401), Hercules (episode 502), and Radar Secret Service (episode 520).
