= The Psychiatrist (TV series) =

1970 American TV series

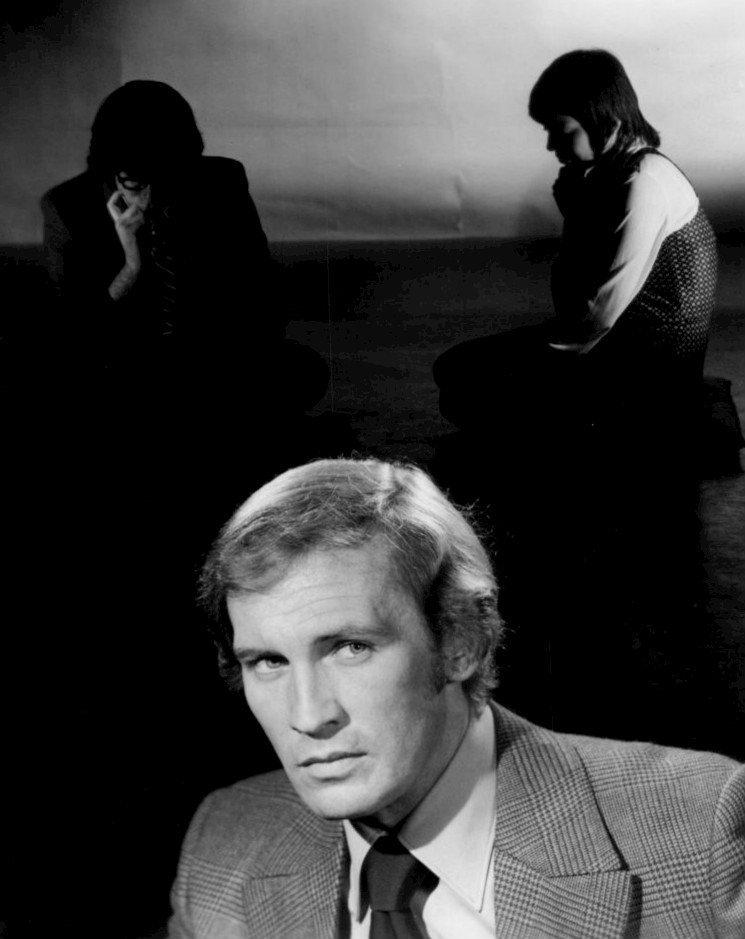
- Roy Thinnes as Dr. James Whitman.
- Starring: Roy Thinnes; Luther Adler
- Country of origin: United States
- Original language: English
- No. of seasons: 1
- No. of episodes: 7

Production
- Executive producer: Norman Felton
- Running time: 60 minutes
- Production companies: Arena Productions; Universal Television

Original release
- Network: NBC
- Release: December 14, 1970
- Release: February 3 – March 10, 1971

The Psychiatrist is an American drama series about a young psychiatrist with unorthodox methods of helping his patients. Roy Thinnes played the title role of Dr. James Whitman. Luther Adler co-starred as Dr. Bernard Altman, the older psychiatrist with whom Whitman worked. Two episodes of the short-lived series, "The Private World of Martin Dalton" and "Par for the Course," were directed by Steven Spielberg. The regular hour-long series ran from February 3, 1971, to March 10 of the same year.

The pilot for the series, a made-for-TV movie called The Psychiatrist: God Bless the Children, aired on December 14, 1970. Actor Pete Duel was at the center of this two hour drama, as Casey Poe, a former drug addict who, after finishing a two-year prison sentence, must battle his own personal demons, as well as the prejudices of others, in order to reenter society. Dr. Whitman is the psychiatrist who must break through Poe's resistance in order to help him form a new life for himself. Duel received much praise for his performance and reprised his role in the first regular episode of the series, "In Death's Other Kingdom."

The Psychiatrist was an element in the wheel series Four in One, which NBC aired in the 10 PM Eastern time slot during its 1970-71 series. The Psychiatrist was the final series of the four to air, following the first-run conclusions of the other three components, McCloud, Night Gallery, and San Francisco International Airport. After all four series had completed their initial six-episode runs, reruns of the four were interspersed with each other until the end of the summer. Of the four elements, McCloud was picked up as one element of a new wheel-format series, the NBC Mystery Movie, and Night Gallery was picked up as a stand-alone series, while San Francisco International Airport and The Psychiatrist were cancelled with no further episodes ordered beyond the original six.

== Cast ==
- Roy Thinnes as Dr. James Whitman
- Luther Adler as Dr. Bernard Altman

== Episode list ==
No.	Title	Directed by	Written by	Original release date
TVM	"God Bless the Children"	Daryl Duke	Story by : Richard Levinson & William Link; Teleplay by : Jerrold Freedman	December 14, 1970
Dr. Whitman and an ex-junkie team up to fight drug addiction in a small town.
1	"In Death's Other Kingdom"	Jerrold Freedman	Jerrold Freedman	February 3, 1971
Dr. Whitman is caught between wanting to help his patient with methadone and the law prohibiting paroled ex-addicts from using any type of drugs in their recovery. With Melendy Britt, Peter Brocco, Jonathan Daly.
2	"The Private World of Martin Dalton"	Steven Spielberg	Bo May	February 10, 1971
Dr. Whitman deals with a troubled young boy who lives in a world of fantasy and steals and is a bad influence on his sister. With Jim Hutton, Kate Woodville, Stephen Hudis.
3	"Such Civil War in My Love and Hate"	Daryl Duke	Story by : Jack Morse; Teleplay by : Jack Morse and Bo May	February 17, 1971
A woman is in bad shape after having an abortion. Her marriage is in jeopardy, her children and her father all causing the woman health issues. With Brenda Vaccaro, Jeff Corey, Paul Carr.
4	"The Longer Trail"	Douglas Day Stewart	Charles Israel	February 24, 1971
Dr. Whitman's client is an American Indian who is married to a white girl and dangerously on the verge of breaking down from a combination of pressures. With Reni Santoni, Jill Haworth, Jay Silverheels.
5	"Ex-Sgt. Randell File, U.S.A."	Jeff Corey	James Woodall	March 3, 1971
Former Army sergeant Randell File is a psychiatric casualty of the Vietnam War. Flashbacks help explain why File may become a casualty again - in Dr. Whitman's therapy group. With John Rubinstein, Kiel Martin, Jonathan Brooks.
6	"Par for the Course"	Steven Spielberg	Story by : Thomas Y. Drake; Teleplay by : Thomas Y. Drake, Herb Bermann, Jerrold Freedman, & Bo May	March 10, 1971
Golf champion Frank Halloran is in his thirties, happily married - and dying of cancer. Unable to cope with his fear, Halloran reaches out to Whitman for help. With Clu Gulager, Joan Darling, Michael C. Gwynne, Carl Reindel, David Astor, Bruce Glover.
