= The Tim Conway Comedy Hour =

Television series

- Genre: Comedy/variety
- Directed by: Bill Hobin
- Starring: Tim Conway; McLean Stevenson; Sally Struthers; Art Metrano; Craig T. Nelson; Bonnie Boland
- No. of seasons: 1
- No. of episodes: 13

Production
- Producers: Bill Hobin; Ron Clark; Sam Bobrick
- Production companies: Timkel Enterprises, Inc.

Original release
- Release: September 20 – December 13, 1970

The Tim Conway Comedy Hour is a variety/sketch comedy television show broadcast in the United States by CBS as part of its 1970 fall lineup on Sundays at 10:00 pm.

== Background ==
The Tim Conway Comedy Hour was one of several attempts to develop a starring vehicle for Tim Conway, who had been a sidekick in the 1962–66 sitcom McHale's Navy and two 1964 theatrical films spun off from it (McHale's Navy and McHale's Navy Joins the Air Force), and in several Disney films, but who had never had much success in developing an audience for programming in which he was the main star (see Rango). His previous show, the situation comedy The Tim Conway Show, had run for only 13 episodes in the spring of 1970, and had been cancelled almost at the same time that he agreed to host The Tim Conway Comedy Hour. Conway had two television flops in the same year.

== Format ==
The show emphasized sketch comedy, musical production numbers and Conway's offbeat humor. The show also featured guest stars: Lana Turner, David Janssen, Joan Crawford, Audrey Meadows, Carl Reiner, Janet Leigh, Tony Randall, Imogene Coca, Shelley Winters, Carol Burnett and Mickey Rooney.

== Reruns ==
The complete series was added to the Stirr program library in 2021 through a licensing arrangement with Shout! Factory.
