= Four in One (TV series) =

Four in One is the umbrella title for a wheel series broadcast in the United States on the NBC television network as part of its 1970-71 schedule in the Wednesday 10 PM Eastern time slot.

Four in One consisted of six episodes of each of four dramatic series: McCloud, San Francisco International Airport, Night Gallery and The Psychiatrist. All six episodes of each program were run in order; then all were rerun interspersed with each other with a different series being shown each week.

After the season, McCloud had proven sufficiently popular to be included as an element in a new wheel-format series, NBC Mystery Movie, while Night Gallery was picked up as a stand-alone series. The other two elements, San Francisco International Airport and The Psychiatrist, were cancelled.

== Episodes ==
Series Title	Episode Title	Original air date
McCloud	"Who Says You Can't Make Friends in New York City?"	September 16, 1970
McCloud	"Horse Stealing on Fifth Avenue"	September 23, 1970
McCloud	"The Concrete Corral"	September 30, 1970
McCloud	"The Stage is All the World"	October 7, 1970
McCloud	"Walk in the Dark"	October 14, 1970
McCloud	"Our Man in Paris"	October 21, 1970
San Francisco International Airport	"Emergency Alert"	October 28, 1970
San Francisco International Airport	"We Once Came Home to Parades"	November 4, 1970
San Francisco International Airport	"Hostage"	November 11, 1970
San Francisco International Airport	"Crisis"	November 18, 1970
San Francisco International Airport	"Supersonic Transport"	November 25, 1970
San Francisco International Airport	"The High Cost of Nightmares"	December 2, 1970
Night Gallery	"The Dead Man; The Housekeeper"	December 16, 1970
Night Gallery	"Room with a View; The Little Black Bag; The Nature of the Enemy"	December 23, 1970
Night Gallery	"The House; Certain Shadows on the Wall"	December 30, 1970
Night Gallery	"Make Me Laugh; Clean Kills and Other Trophies"	January 6, 1971
Night Gallery	"The Doll; Lone Survivor; Pamela's Voice"	January 13, 1971
Night Gallery	"The Last Laurel; They're Tearing Down Tim Riley's Bar"	January 20, 1971
The Psychiatrist	"In Death's Other Kingdom"	February 3, 1971
The Psychiatrist	"The Private World of Martin Dalton"	February 10, 1971
The Psychiatrist	"Such Civil War in My Love and Hate"	February 17, 1971
The Psychiatrist	"The Longer Trail"	February 24, 1971
The Psychiatrist	"The Ex-Sgt. Randell File"	March 3, 1971
The Psychiatrist	"Par for the Course"	March 10, 1971

== Bibliography ==
- Tim Brooks and Earle Marsh, The Complete Directory to Prime Time Network and Cable TV Shows 1946–Present, Ninth edition (New York: Ballantine Books, 2007) ISBN 978-0-345-49773-4
