= The Ice Palace (TV show) =

- Genre: Variety show
- Country of origin: United States
- Original language: English
- No. of seasons: 1
- No. of episodes: 8

Production
- Executive producer: Peter Engel
- Running time: 60 minutes
- Production company: Metromedia Producers Corp.

Original release
- Network: CBS
- Release: 23 May – 25 July 1971

The Ice Palace was a CBS television variety show featuring stars of The Ice Capades, which aired for eight episodes in the summer of 1971, from May 23 to July 25, 1971.

Each episode featured a star host (who did not skate), and Leslie Uggams hosted the first episode. It was primarily a variety show, with the dance numbers replaced by ice skating performances. The show was produced by Metromedia Producers Corp., and Peter Engel (best known for the teen sitcoms he produced in the 1980s and 1990s) was the executive producer. Metromedia also owned The Ice Capades at this time, and Bob Turk, who produced their traveling show, was an associate producer for the TV show.

The idea for the show sprung from a November 1970 Ice Capades special on NBC. CBS signed up for the show in April 1971, and the debut episode was filmed only six days before it aired. CBS had an option to bring back the show in January 1972 as a mid-season replacement which was not exercised.
