= Comedy Playhouse (American TV series) =

American television anthology series

- Genre: Anthology series
- Country of origin: United States
- Original language: English
- No. of seasons: 1
- No. of episodes: 5

Production
- Running time: 30 minutes

Original release
- Network: CBS
- Release: August 1 – September 5, 1971

Comedy Playhouse is an American anthology television series that aired on CBS in the summer of 1971. The 30-minute episodes consisted of unsold television pilots.

== Background ==
The practice of television executives of ordering dozens of pilots for proposed television series each year – far more than their networks could possibly broadcast as series – created a sizable body of unsold pilots that had never aired. Packaging these unsold pilots in anthology series and airing them during the summer provided television networks with a way of both providing fresh programming during the summer rerun season and recouping at least some of the expense of producing them. Comedy Playhouse was one of these series, aired by CBS in the summer of 1971, and it consisted of unsold pilots for four situation comedies and one hidden camera reality television show. Stars appearing in the series included Janet Leigh, McLean Stevenson, Phil Silvers, Elke Sommer, Michael Landon, Dick Martin, Rose Marie, and Peter Marshall.

== Broadcast history ==
Comedy Playhouse ran for five episodes over the course of six weeks in the summer of 1971, airing on CBS from 8:00 to 8:30 p.m. Eastern Time on Sunday evenings. It premiered on August 1, and its last episode aired on September 5. The episode scheduled for August 15 was preempted by an address by President Richard Nixon and was rescheduled for September 5.

== Episodes ==
No.	Title	Directed by	Written by	Original release date
1	"My Wives Jane"	Unknown	Unknown	August 1, 1971
Confusion arises between the real and fictional lives of a soap opera actress who is married to a physician in real life. Starring Janet Leigh, Barry Nelson, John Dehner, and McLean Stevenson.
2	"An Amateur's Guide to Love"	Gordon Wiles	Unknown	August 8, 1971
Hidden cameras catch the reactions of unsuspecting people while girl-watching, while getting married, and when being asked for a date by a hair dryer. Starring Dick Martin, Rose Marie, Michael Landon, and Peter Marshall.
3	"Elke"	Melville Shavelson	Melville Shavelson	August 22, 1971
After marrying an American physician, a German-born woman discovers that her husband's family and friends suspect that she married him only for his money and to get American citizenship. Starring Elke Sommer, Peter Bonerz, Debbie Storm, Kay Medford, and Paul Peterson.
4	"Shepherd's Flock"	Peter Tewksbury	Allan Burns & Chris Hayward	August 29, 1971
Jack Shepherd, a quick-tempered former professional American football star prone to saying the wrong thing, has trouble adjusting to his new role when he becomes a Christian minister, and he faces an additional challenge when he discovers that his parishioners have no church in which to worship. Starring Kenneth Mars, Don Ameche, Jill Jaress, John Schuck, Ralph Williams, Tony Van Bridge, Frederic Downs, Olive Dunbar, and Steve Martin.
5	"The Phil Silvers Show"	Unknown	Unknown	September 5, 1971
Alternatively titled "Eddie". A private security guard for a gated community lives the life of a millionaire thanks to his employees. Starring Phil Silvers and Patricia Barry.
