= The NBC Monday Movie =

- Also known as: Monday Night at the Movies; Wednesday Night at the Movies; Tuesday Night at the Movies
- Country of origin: United States
- Original language: English

Production
- Running time: 120 mins. (approx)

Original release
- Network: NBC
- Release: February 4, 1963 – 2003

The NBC Monday Movie was a television anthology series of films that debuted on February 4, 1963 (in the middle of the 1962–63 season). It was referred to as Monday Night at the Movies prior to the mid-1980s. Contrary to popular contemporary belief, the corporate initials, "NBC", were, at first, not part of the official title for the network's anthologies of old movies and would not be for years to come. Thus, in 1964, when the show was transferred by the network's programming executives to Wednesday nights, it became Wednesday Night at the Movies. And in 1965, when the program moved to Tuesdays, it became Tuesday Night at the Movies. It would remain there until 1969. The name would henceforth change depending on whichever night of the week the program aired. Moreover, by 1968, there was once again a weekly Monday Night at the Movies on the air. It ran until 1997.

In the latter years of Monday Night at the Movies' run, more and more made-for-TV movies were showcased, while theatrical films, fewer in number, were edited for content, to remove objectionable material, and occasionally, but not always, to reduce the film's running time to fit into the two-hour time slot. Most widescreen films were pan-and-scanned so the image would fit the standard 4:3 television screen (as opposed to letterbox format). An exception was the 1951 film version of Show Boat, which made its television debut on Monday Night at the Movies in 1972. Show Boat had been produced by MGM before the advent of widescreen American films in 1953. It was a rather unusual offering since (then) it was a twenty-one-year-old film. (In fact, the oldest film shown on any of NBC's "At the Movies" anthologies was Saratoga Trunk (1945), which aired on Saturday Night at the Movies, January 13, 1968, 23 years after its Hollywood premiere.)

== Background ==
The idea for the show came about when advertisers opted out of two 60-minute shows the network ran on Monday nights for the 1962–1963 season -- It's a Man's World (from 7:30-8:30 pm, Eastern Time) and Saints and Sinners (from 8:30-9:30), the latter of which suffered from having "no chemistry, and never any real ratings." Having experienced some audience success with Saturday Night at the Movies ever since its premiere in Fall 1961, the network decided to acquire more feature films as a stop-gap measure for NBC's dismal numbers on Monday nights. Thus, a package of 42 movies from 20th Century Fox and 35 titles from MGM were purchased by the network for both its Monday and Saturday night movie series at a cost of $14 million. With a 7:30 pm (EST) start time, the movies of the show's first season were made up of mostly action-adventures, an occasional romance such as My Cousin Rachel, and two Pat Boone musicals. These films usually ran under 100 minutes, the normal running-time for a two-hour movie slot (with commercial interruptions) in 1963.

== The first two series of films (February 1963–April 1964) ==
The first incarnation of Monday Night at the Movies lasted from February 1963 until early September 1964. Despite the promise of big name stars each week, the series was no match for the CBS lineup of game shows and sitcoms such as The Lucy Show and The Danny Thomas Show. In hopes of better ratings and to re-coup some of their investment, the films in the second list below would be re-broadcast on Saturday Night at the Movies in the late spring and summer of 1964.

Unless otherwise indicated, all films aired from 7:30pm–9:30pm Eastern Time on Monday Nights. The last number in the second list below notes the Nielsen rating the movie received:

These first sixteen titles (all produced by 20th Century Fox studios) were aired on the following dates:

1. (1963-02-04) The Enemy Below (1957)
2. (1963-02-11) The Bravados (1958)
3. (1963-02-18) Heaven Knows, Mr. Allison (1957)
4. (1963-02-25) King of the Khyber Rifles (1953)
5. (1963-03-04) Hell and High Water (1954)
6. (1963-03-11) Prince Valiant (1954)
7. (1963-03-18) Boy on a Dolphin (1957)
8. (1963-03-25) From Hell to Texas (1958)
9. (1963-04-01) My Cousin Rachel (1952)
10. (1963-04-08) April Love (1957)
11. (1963-04-15) An Affair to Remember (1957) (2 hrs, 30 min.)
12. (1963-04-22) The Barbarian and the Geisha (1958)
13. (1963-04-29) The Hunters (1958)
14. (1963-05-06) Harry Black and the Tiger (1958)
15. (1963-05-13) The Mudlark (1950)
16. (1963-05-20) Mardi Gras (1958)

From here through September 9, the above titles were rerun on Monday nights. None of them appeared on NBC's other film series, Saturday Night at the Movies. The second season began below and mixed in MGM titles with those of 20th Century Fox. Like the above-listed films, these were all television premieres. The Nielsen ratings are listed next to the release year of each title.

One interesting note: There is no entry below for November 25, 1963. This was the Monday after the Friday that President John Kennedy was assassinated. Monday was the date of the state funeral, which was given all-day coverage by the networks. Understandably, NBC thus postponed broadcasting the musical Singin' in the Rain (originally slated for 1963-11-25) until later in the season.

1. (1963-09-16) Love Is a Many Splendored Thing (1955) (19.7)
2. (1963-09-23) David and Bathsheba (1951; 2hrs, 30 min.) (17.9)
3. (1963-09-30) Executive Suite (1954) {First film on Network TV to receive the 'Edited for Television' tag on-screen; 4 minutes were cut} (15.4)
4. (1963-10-07) The Wreck of the Mary Deare (1959) {5 minutes were cut for TV.} (15.5)
5. (1963-10-14) The Rains of Ranchipur (1955) {4 minutes were cut for TV.} (16.0)
6. (1963-10-21) The Mating Game (1959) (27.1)
7. (1963-10-28) Good Morning, Miss Dove (1955) {7 minutes were cut for TV.} (19.4)
8. (1963-11-04) White Feather (1955) (18.2)
9. (1963-11-11) Father of the Bride (1950) (19.3)
10. (1963-11-18) The Reluctant Debutante (1958) (16.5)
11. (1963-12-02) House of Numbers (1957) (16.7)
12. (1963-12-09) The Wings of Eagles (1957) {10 minutes were cut for TV} (22.3)
13. (1963-12-16) Lost World (1960) (20.7)
14. (1963-12-23) The Power and the Prize (1956) (N/A)
15. (1963-12-30) Kiss Me Kate (1953) {9 minutes were cut for TV} (15.9)
16. (1964-01-06) The Seven Cities of Gold (1955) (17.4)
17. (1964-01-13) Singin' in the Rain (1952) (19.4)
18. (1964-01-20) Action of the Tiger (1957) (15.8)
19. (1964-01-27) House of Bamboo (1955) (17.7)
20. (1964-02-03) Phone Call from a Stranger (1952) (18.2)
21. (1964-02-10) Treasure of the Golden Condor (1953) (17.4)
22. (1964-02-17) The Safecracker (1958) (13.4)
23. (1964-02-24) Prince of Players (1955) (10.6)
24. (1964-03-02) Underwater Warrior (1958) (16.0)
25. (1964-03-09) The 39 Steps (1960) (15.0)
26. (1964-03-16) The View from Pompey's Head (1955) (18.5)
27. (1964-03-23) The Racers (1955) (16.6)
28. (1964-03-30) The Pride of St. Louis (1952) (18.9)
29. (1964-04-06) The Virgin Queen (1955) (14.4)
30. (1964-04-13) Never Let Me Go (1960) (17.1)

From here, reruns were shown for the remainder of the season until mid-September 1964, when NBC announced that it would discontinue Monday Night at the Movies. Instead, a new prime-time movie night, Wednesdays, from 9 until 11 p.m. (ET), became the time slot for the network's alternative film anthology during the 1964–65 season while Saturday nights remained a mainstay for NBC's film broadcasts.
