= The ABC Sunday Night Movie =

Television program

- Genre: Movies
- Country of origin: United States
- No. of seasons: 36

Production
- Running time: 120–180 minutes (with commercials)

Original release
- Network: ABC
- Release: April 8, 1962 – August 2, 1998

Related
- ABC Movie of the Week; ABC Saturday Movie of the Week; Wonderful World of Disney

The ABC Sunday Night Movie is a television program that aired on Sunday nights, first for a brief time in 1962 under the title Hollywood Special (although Time magazine lists this version as The Sunday Night Movie) to supposedly replace an open time slot for the TV show Bus Stop, which was cancelled after March 1962. It then began airing regularly under its more commonly known title from late 1964 to 1998, on ABC. Since 2004, it has aired sporadically as a special program, now titled the ABC Sunday Movie of the Week, though as of the 2011–12 television season, the only films in this timeslot were aired under the Hallmark Hall of Fame banner, which transferred to ABC in that season. However, in 2014, The Hallmark Hall of Fame moved exclusively to cable on the Hallmark Channel. As a result of this, the Sunday Night Movie is now exclusively relegated to two special holiday movies, The Sound of Music every holiday season and The Ten Commandments every Easter.

The ABC Sunday Night Movie was replaced in 1998 with The Wonderful World of Disney although the Sunday Night Movie initially continued to air alongside TWWOD for its final season.

== History ==
Encouraged by the ratings success on NBC's Saturday Night at the Movies, ABC initially purchased 15 United Artists films released in the late 1950s for its April 1962 premiere. United Artists Television also provided some short featurettes promoting upcoming United Artists cinema releases to fill out some films that ended before the two hour time slot finished.

=== Edits for television ===
The program presented theatrical feature films airing on television for the first time. The feature films were edited for content, to remove objectionable material, and for time - one such instance was the first network telecast in 1962 of John Huston's 1956 film Moby Dick, a Warner Bros. film which runs 117 minutes uncut, and yet was shown in a two-hour time slot with commercials. In many cases, however, the broadcast was expanded from two to two-and-a-half hours to fit a film's longer running time, as in the two 1966 network telecasts of Rodgers and Hammerstein's Carousel (a 1956 film not to be confused with the 1967 videotaped television adaptation of the musical, also broadcast by ABC). The first major network showing of Superman in 1982 was broadcast in two parts with previously unused footage. Extra footage was also added to the ABC broadcast of Star Trek: The Motion Picture in 1983, Superman II in 1984 and Star Trek II: The Wrath of Khan in 1985.

Because the concept of letterboxing films for television had not been introduced yet, the films shown were also pan-and-scanned so the image would fit the standard 4:3 television screen.

=== James Bond franchise ===
In 1972, ABC bought the broadcasting rights to the James Bond franchise (also by United Artists). The first film broadcast was Goldfinger. Unlike the British broadcasts of the James Bond films, the franchise was not presented in production order.

ABC made edits to the Bond films for violence, sexual content, and so that the films would fit in the time allotted, but perhaps the most controversial of these was the re-edit of the 1969 film On Her Majesty's Secret Service broadcast on the ABC Monday Night Movie. Broadcast on February 16 and February 23, 1976, the edit involved the film being split into two for a two-night broadcast while including a voiceover (primarily for the first showing) meant to sound like George Lazenby that starts with the ski chase scene before including flashbacks to prior scenes. A subsequent re-airing of the film years later showed it in a three-hour time slot with no edits.

ABC held the rights to the James Bond films until 1990, when The Living Daylights was the final film aired prior to Turner Broadcasting buying the television rights to the franchise. The Bond films have also aired on several cable channels not owned by Turner. ABC broadcast the films again as a promotional tie-in when Die Another Day was in theaters in 2002, dubbed as The Bond Picture Show on Saturday nights.

=== ABC Sunday Movie Special ===
Occasionally, The ABC Sunday Night Movie would telecast what they termed an ABC Sunday Movie Special when a film presentation was over three hours or overflowed prime time. When the movie in question was a family film, the telecasts would begin at an earlier hour, so that the film would end at around 11:00 p.m, enabling younger viewers to watch without having to stay up too late. The Movie Specials invariably consisted of blockbusters, such as The Bridge on the River Kwai, The Robe, Oliver!, and The Ten Commandments. The last-named film continues its television career on ABC today, having become, like The Wizard of Oz, an annual television tradition. It is usually shown during the Palm Sunday or Easter weekend (The Robe, which made its television debut in 1968, had been shown on Easter weekends by ABC prior to being sold to local television stations). The telecast of Patton, which took place in 1972 at 9 P.M. E.S.T., was remarkably mature, in that very little of the film's profanity was cut for television.

ABC would occasionally telecast Movie Specials on other days of the week as well, among them Fiddler on the Roof, and Godspell (which was shown on network television as a Thanksgiving season special in 1974).

=== Method of presenting films throughout the 1960s ===
Beginning in 1965, The ABC Sunday Night Movie used a rather unusual method of presenting the films that movie series on other networks did not use. Except on rare occasions, such as the aforementioned Movie Specials, or films which already had a pre-credits sequence that led directly into the main title and so could not be altered, the opening credits of the particular film in question generally would not be shown until after the movie had ended. Instead, a teaser from the film was shown, whereupon an offscreen announcer (e.g. Joel Crager) would say the name of the film and its stars, and then the credit The ABC Sunday Night Movie would appear. A commercial would then follow, and when the program started up again, one would see the screenwriter and the director's names respectively - superimposed over the film's opening scene in credits manufactured by ABC. At film's end, another commercial would follow, after which, somewhat anti-climactically, the movie's actual opening credits, together with the studio logo, would then be presented exactly as they were originally made, as if the film were starting up again.

The ABC Sunday Night Movie was also famous in the mid 1970s for its theme music and brightly colored marquee. The opening has been parodied on the G4 network under the title Movies That Don't Suck.

=== Other nights and methods of presentation ===
From 1968 to 1970, ABC ran a concurrent movie series on Wednesday nights, under the title The ABC Wednesday Night Movie.

A Tuesday night ABC Movie of the Week featuring only made-for-TV movies was added in 1969. The series was renamed Tuesday Movie of the Week and a Wednesday night Wednesday Movie of the Week, also presenting only made-for-TV films, was added in 1972. Both series continued until 1975.

From 1975 to 1983 (and again, briefly, in 1999) ABC ran a concurrent movie series on Friday nights, under the title The ABC Friday Night Movie.

Other concurrent movie series during that time also aired on Mondays, Tuesdays, Thursdays, and Saturdays.

During the 1980s, films with more mature and politically charged themes, such as The Day After and Consenting Adult (homosexuality) aired under the ABC Theater banner.

Beginning in 1999, a Saturday night variant on the formula began, and has been somewhat of a ratings favorite. However, and more importantly nowadays, the ratings have varied from week to week. Since 1999, The ABC Saturday Night Movie has alternated with random repeats, The Wonderful World of Disney (up until 2008), and Saturday Night Football, which runs from the first Saturday in September, up into the first of December. Movies also alternate on various other nights of the week, for sweeps and also as holiday-based programming, such as the annual pre-Easter telecast of The Ten Commandments.

=== Announcers ===
For many years, until the early 1980s, the announcer for all of ABC's movie shows was network staff announcer Joel Crager. Afterwards, the duties would be handled first by Ernie Anderson, often in rotation with others such as Gary Owens, who generally lent his voice to introducing light-hearted comedies and family films.

=== Decline due to the advent of cable networks ===
The advent of such cable television networks as HBO, Cinemax, Showtime and The Movie Channel (all of which broadcast theatrical films on cable before they appear on commercial television), along with the emergence of various home video formats, led to the decline of theatrical films regularly airing on commercial network television. During the late 1970s and early 1980s, print ads for The ABC Sunday Night Movie regularly played up the quality of the film being offered to viewers at no cost ("Another Great Film Not On Pay TV"). Whereas one used to be able to see a relatively recent theatrical film on prime time commercial network television every night of the week, this is now done only occasionally (or, in the case of ABC's Saturday Movie of the Week, only when the network has no other sports commitments, usually confined to holiday weekends). Only cable networks exclusively devoted to films, such as AMC or Turner Classic Movies, show theatrical films in prime time every night; the big three networks, including the newer Fox network no longer follow this practice, except perhaps on holidays. The grand opening sequences of the past are now usually eschewed by merely mentioning the airing title in an 'up next' sequence, or a direct cut to a disclaimer noting the film has been edited and presented for a broadcast television presentation with the assumption viewers have already viewed the basic electronic program guide information for the film.

ABC has since begun to carry classic Disney animated and live-action films under the Wonderful World of Disney banner throughout the 2020s on Sunday evenings when American Idol is out of season (and providing counterprogramming to NBC's Sunday night primetime sports block), which now mainly serves as a secondary platform to promote subscriptions to its parent company's streaming service, Disney+, where those films are available.

== Ratings for selected films ==
Date	Movie	Household ratings or viewers
April 8, 1962	Moby Dick	Rating: 7.3
September 25, 1966	The Bridge on the River Kwai	Rating: 38.3
March 26, 1967	The Robe	Rating: 31.0
June 2, 1968	Walk on the Wild Side	Rating: 0.70
March 9, 1969	The Cardinal	Rating: 7.1
January 4, 1970	The Naked Prey	Rating: 6.6
January 11, 1970	House on Greenapple Road	Rating: 7.1
January 18, 1970	Woman Times Seven	Rating: 6.8
January 25, 1970	Hombre	Rating: 7.4
February 1, 1970	In Like Flint	Rating: 7.3
February 8, 1970	The Oscar	Rating: 7.6
February 15, 1970	Dead Heat on a Merry-Go-Round	Rating: 7.1
February 22, 1970	The Family Jewels	Rating: 4.9
March 1, 1970	The Sons of Katie Elder	Rating: 7.0
March 8, 1970	Dial Hot Line	Rating: 7.4
March 15, 1970	Up from the Beach	Rating: 6.3
March 29, 1970	The Chase	Rating: 7.5
April 5, 1970	The Lonely Man	Rating: 7.3
April 12, 1970	Scared Stiff	Rating: 7.7
April 19, 1970	Fall of the Roman Empire	Rating: 6.4
April 26, 1970	Duel of the Titans	Rating: 7.3
May 3, 1970	Night Into Morning	Rating: 6.8
May 10, 1970	The Blob	Rating: 6.4
May 17, 1970	It! The Terror from Beyond Space	Rating: 6.1
May 24, 1970	Code Two	Rating: 6.4
May 31, 1970	Glory Alley	Rating: 6.0
June 7, 1970	Penelope	Rating: 6.3
July 5, 1970	Rage	Rating: 6.3
July 19, 1970	Skullduggery	Rating: 4.7
July 26, 1970	The Girls On The Beach	Rating: 5.2
October 1, 1972	Love Story	Rating: 42.3
November 12, 1972	True Grit	Rating: 38.9
November 19, 1972	Patton	Rating: 38.5
February 18, 1973	The Ten Commandments	Rating: 33.2
November 11, 1973	Airport	Rating: 42.3
October 27, 1974	The Poseidon Adventure	Rating: 39.0
January 18, 1976	Jeremiah Johnson	Rating: 37.5
February 29, 1976	The Sound of Music	Rating: 33.6
November 4, 1979	Jaws	Rating: 39.1
October 31, 1982	The Wild Women of Chastity Gulch	Rating: 17
November 20, 1983	The Day After	Rating: 46
November 26, 1989	Blind Witness	Rating: 16.3
March 11, 1990	Brewster Place	Viewers: 13.9 million
March 18, 1990	Love and Lies	Viewers: 16.8 million
May 12, 1991	An Inconvenient Woman (Part 1 of 2)	Viewers: 16.6 million
October 10, 1993	Shameful Secrets	Viewers: 18.1 million
February 16, 1997	...First Do No Harm	Viewers: 15.7 million
September 28, 1997	Two Came Back	Viewers: 13.28 million
November 2, 1997	Before Women Had Wings	Rating: 18.7
December 28, 1997	I Love Trouble	Viewers: 17.6 million
February 11, 2001	Dr. Dolittle	Viewers: 15.6 million
November 11, 2001	Saving Private Ryan	Viewers: 17.9 million
January 27, 2002	Mouse Hunt	Viewers: 10.4 million
November 24, 2002	The Pennsylvania Miners' Story	Viewers: 13.2 million
December 29, 2002	The Sound of Music	Viewers: 11.5 million
May 11, 2003	E.T.: The Extra-Terrestrial	Viewers: 7.5 million
February 8, 2004	Pearl Harbor	Viewers: 9.4 million
May 9, 2004	Harry Potter and the Philosopher's Stone	Viewers: 11.1 million
June 20, 2004	Bicentennial Man	Viewers: 5.1 million
December 5, 2004	Mitch Albom's The Five People You Meet in Heaven	Viewers: 18.6 million
