= 1969–70 United States network television schedule =

The following is the 1969–70 network television schedule for the three major English language commercial broadcast networks in the United States. The schedule covers primetime hours from September 1969 through August 1970. The schedule is followed by a list per network of returning series, new series, and series cancelled after the 1968–69 season.

New fall series are highlighted in bold.

Each of the 30 highest-rated shows is listed with its rank and rating as determined by Nielsen Media Research.

Yellow indicates the programs in the top 10 for the season.
Cyan indicates the programs in the top 20 for the season.
Magenta indicates the programs in the top 30 for the season.

The National Educational Television (NET) was in operation, but the schedule was set by each local station.

== Sunday ==
Network		7:00 PM	7:30 PM	8:00 PM	8:30 PM	9:00 PM	9:30 PM	10:00 PM	10:30 PM
ABC		Land of the Giants		The F.B.I. (24/20.6) (Tied with NBC Saturday Night at the Movies and Bewitched)		The ABC Sunday Night Movie			
CBS	Fall	Lassie	**To Rome With Love**	The Ed Sullivan Show (27/20.3)		**The Leslie Uggams Show**		Mission: Impossible	
CBS	December	Lassie	**To Rome With Love**	The Ed Sullivan Show (27/20.3)		The Glen Campbell Goodtime Hour (20/21.0) (Tied with Hee Haw)		Mission: Impossible	
CBS	Summer	Lassie	**To Rome With Love**	The Ed Sullivan Show (27/20.3)		**Comedy Tonight**		Mission: Impossible	
NBC		Wild Kingdom	The Wonderful World of Disney (9/23.6)		**The Bill Cosby Show** (11/22.7)	Bonanza (3/24.8)		**The Bold Ones:** **The New Doctors /** **The Lawyers / The Law Enforcers (aka The Protectors)**	

== Monday ==
Network		7:30 PM	8:00 PM	8:30 PM	9:00 PM	9:30 PM	10:00 PM	10:30 PM
ABC	Fall	**The Music Scene** (7:30) / **The New People** (8:15)			**Lana Turner starring in Harold Robbins' "The Survivors"**		**Love, American Style**	
ABC	Winter	It Takes a Thief		ABC Monday Night Movie				**Now**
CBS	Fall	Gunsmoke (2/25.9)		Here's Lucy (6/23.9)	Mayberry R.F.D. (4/24.4)	The Doris Day Show (10/22.8)	The Carol Burnett Show (13/22.1)	
CBS	Summer	Gunsmoke (2/25.9)		The Lucy Show reruns	Mayberry R.F.D. (4/24.4)	The Doris Day Show (10/22.8)	The Wild Wild West reruns	
NBC		**My World and Welcome to It**	Rowan & Martin's Laugh-In (1/26.3)		NBC Monday Night at the Movies			

== Tuesday ==
Network	7:30 PM	8:00 PM	8:30 PM	9:00 PM	9:30 PM	10:00 PM	10:30 PM
ABC	The Mod Squad (23/20.8)		**ABC Movie of the Week** (22/20.9)			**Marcus Welby, M.D.** (8/23.7)	
CBS	Lancer		The Red Skelton Hour (7/23.8)		**The Governor & J.J.**	CBS News Hour / 60 Minutes	
NBC	I Dream of Jeannie	**The Debbie Reynolds Show**	Julia (28/20.1)	NBC Tuesday Night at the Movies / First Tuesday (once a month)			

== Wednesday ==
Network		7:30 PM	8:00 PM	8:30 PM	9:00 PM	9:30 PM	10:00 PM	10:30 PM
ABC	Fall	The Flying Nun	**The Courtship of Eddie's Father**	**Room 222**	The ABC Wednesday Night Movie			
ABC	Winter	**Nanny and the Professor**	**The Courtship of Eddie's Father**	**Room 222**	The Johnny Cash Show (15/21.8) (Tied with My Three Sons and Ironside)		**The Engelbert Humperdinck Show**	
ABC	Summer	**Nanny and the Professor**	**The Courtship of Eddie's Father**	**Room 222**	**Johnny Cash Presents the Everly Brothers Show**		**The Smothers Brothers Show**	
CBS	Fall	The Glen Campbell Goodtime Hour (20/21.0) (Tied with Hee Haw)		The Beverly Hillbillies (18/21.7)	**Medical Center**		Hawaii Five-O (19/21.1)	
CBS	Winter	Hee Haw (20/21.0) (Tied with The Glen Campbell Goodtime Hour)		The Beverly Hillbillies (18/21.7)	**Medical Center**		Hawaii Five-O (19/21.1)	
CBS	Summer	**Where's Huddles?**	Gomer Pyle, U.S.M.C. reruns	The Beverly Hillbillies (18/21.7)	**Medical Center**		Hawaii Five-O (19/21.1)	
NBC		The Virginian			Kraft Music Hall		**Then Came Bronson**	

== Thursday ==
Network		7:30 PM	8:00 PM	8:30 PM	9:00 PM	9:30 PM	10:00 PM	10:30 PM
ABC	Fall	The Ghost & Mrs. Muir	That Girl	Bewitched (24/20.6) (Tied with NBC Saturday Night at the Movies and The F.B.I.)	This is Tom Jones		It Takes a Thief	
ABC	Winter	**Pat Paulsen's Half a Comedy Hour**	That Girl	Bewitched (24/20.6) (Tied with NBC Saturday Night at the Movies and The F.B.I.)	This is Tom Jones		**Paris 7000**	
ABC	Spring	Animal World	That Girl	Bewitched (24/20.6) (Tied with NBC Saturday Night at the Movies and The F.B.I.)	This is Tom Jones		**Paris 7000**	
ABC	Summer	Animal World	That Girl	Bewitched (24/20.6) (Tied with NBC Saturday Night at the Movies and The F.B.I.)	This is Tom Jones		**Lana Turner starring in Harold Robbins' "The Survivors"**	
CBS		Family Affair (5/24.2)	**The Jim Nabors Hour** (12/22.4)		CBS Thursday Night Movie (29/20.0)			
NBC	Fall	Daniel Boone		Ironside (15/21.8) (Tied with My Three Sons and The Johnny Cash Show)		Dragnet 1970	The Dean Martin Show (14/21.9)	
NBC	July	Daniel Boone		Ironside (15/21.8) (Tied with My Three Sons and The Johnny Cash Show)		Dragnet 1970	**Dean Martin Presents the Golddiggers in London**	

== Friday ==
Network		7:30 PM	8:00 PM	8:30 PM	9:00 PM	9:30 PM	10:00 PM	10:30 PM
ABC	Fall	Let's Make a Deal	**The Brady Bunch**	**Mr. Deeds Goes to Town**	Here Come the Brides		**Jimmy Durante Presents the Lennon Sisters**	
ABC	Winter	The Flying Nun	**The Brady Bunch**	The Ghost & Mrs. Muir	Here Come the Brides		**Love, American Style**	
CBS	Fall	Get Smart	The Good Guys	Hogan's Heroes	The CBS Friday Night Movie			
CBS	Winter	Get Smart	**The Tim Conway Show**	Hogan's Heroes	The CBS Friday Night Movie			
CBS	Spring	**CBS News Adventure**		Hogan's Heroes	The CBS Friday Night Movie			
CBS	Follow-up	Get Smart	**The Tim Conway Show**	Hogan's Heroes	The CBS Friday Night Movie			
CBS	Summer	Get Smart	He & She reruns	Hogan's Heroes	The CBS Friday Night Movie			
NBC		The High Chaparral		The Name of the Game			**Bracken's World**	

== Saturday ==
Network		7:30 PM	8:00 PM	8:30 PM	9:00 PM	9:30 PM	10:00 PM	10:30 PM
ABC	Fall	The Dating Game	The Newlywed Game	The Lawrence Welk Show		The Hollywood Palace		Local
ABC	February	Let's Make a Deal	The Newlywed Game	The Lawrence Welk Show		**Jimmy Durante Presents the Lennon Sisters**		Local
ABC	July	Let's Make a Deal	The Newlywed Game	The Lawrence Welk Show		**The Engelbert Humperdinck Show**		Local
CBS		The Jackie Gleason Show		My Three Sons (15/21.8) (Tied with Ironside and The Johnny Cash Show)	Green Acres	Petticoat Junction	Mannix (30/19.9)	
NBC	Fall	The Andy Williams Show		Adam-12	NBC Saturday Night at the Movies (24/20.6) (Tied with Bewitched and The F.B.I.)			
NBC	Summer	**Andy Williams Presents Ray Stevens**		Adam-12	NBC Saturday Night at the Movies (24/20.6) (Tied with Bewitched and The F.B.I.)			

== By network ==
=== ABC ===
**Returning Series**

- The ABC Sunday Night Movie
- The ABC Wednesday Night Movie
- Animal World
- Bewitched
- The Dating Game
- The F.B.I.
- The Flying Nun
- The Ghost & Mrs. Muir (moved from NBC)
- Here Come the Brides
- The Hollywood Palace
- It Takes a Thief
- Land of the Giants
- The Lawrence Welk Show
- Let's Make a Deal
- The Mod Squad
- The Newlywed Game
- The Smothers Brothers Comedy Hour
- That Girl
- This Is Tom Jones

**New Series**

- **ABC Monday Night Movie**
- **ABC Movie of the Week**
- **The Brady Bunch**
- **The Courtship of Eddie's Father**
- **The Engelbert Humperdinck Show** *
- **Jimmy Durante Presents the Lennon Sisters** *
- **Johnny Cash Presents the Everly Brothers Show**
- **Lana Turner starring in Harold Robbins' "The Survivors"**
- **Love, American Style**
- **Marcus Welby, M.D.**
- **Mr. Deeds Goes to Town**
- **The Music Scene**
- **Nanny and the Professor** *
- **The New People**
- **Now** *
- **Paris 7000** *
- **Pat Paulsen's Half a Comedy Hour** *
- **Room 222**

Not returning from 1968–69:

- The Avengers
- The Big Valley
- The Dick Cavett Show (moved to late night)
- The Don Rickles Show
- Felony Squad
- The Generation Gap
- The Guns of Will Sonnett
- The John Davidson Show
- Journey to the Unknown
- Judd, for the Defense
- The King Family Show
- N.Y.P.D.
- Operation: Entertainment
- The Outcasts
- Peyton Place
- Saga of Western Man
- That's Life
- Turn-On
- The Ugliest Girl in Town
- What's it All About, World?

=== CBS ===
**Returning Series**

- The 21st Century
- The Beverly Hillbillies
- The Carol Burnett Show
- CBS News Hour
- CBS Playhouse
- CBS Thursday Night Movie
- 60 Minutes
- The Doris Day Show
- The Ed Sullivan Show
- Family Affair
- Get Smart (moved from NBC)
- The Glen Campbell Goodtime Hour
- The Good Guys
- Green Acres
- Gunsmoke
- Hawaii Five-O
- Hee Haw
- Here's Lucy
- Hogan's Heroes
- The Jackie Gleason Show
- Lancer
- Lassie
- Mannix
- Mayberry R.F.D.
- Mission: Impossible
- My Three Sons
- Petticoat Junction
- The Red Skelton Hour
- The Wild Wild West

**New Series**

- **CBS News Adventure** *
- **Comedy Tonight** *
- **The Governor & J.J.**
- **The Jim Nabors Hour**
- **The Leslie Uggams Show**
- **Medical Center**
- **The Tim Conway Show** *
- **To Rome with Love**
- **Where's Huddles?** *

Not returning from 1968–69:

- Blondie
- Gentle Ben
- Gomer Pyle, U.S.M.C.
- The Jonathan Winters Show
- The Liberace Show
- The Queen & I

=== NBC ===
**Returning Series**

- Adam-12
- The Andy Williams Show
- Bonanza
- Columbo
- Daniel Boone
- The Dean Martin Show
- Dragnet 1970
- First Tuesday
- The High Chaparral
- I Dream of Jeannie
- Ironside
- Julia
- Kraft Music Hall
- The Name of the Game
- NBC Monday Night at the Movies
- The NBC Mystery Movie
- NBC Saturday Night at the Movies
- Rowan & Martin's Laugh-In
- The Virginian
- Wild Kingdom
- The Wonderful World of Disney

**New Series**

- **Andy Williams Presents Ray Stevens** *
- **The Bill Cosby Show**
- **The Bold Ones**
- **Bracken's World**
- **Dean Martin Presents the Golddiggers in London**
- **The Debbie Reynolds Show**
- **Jambo**
- **Letters to Laugh-In** *
- **My World and Welcome to It**
- **Night Gallery**
- **Strange Report**
- **Then Came Bronson**

Not returning from 1968–69:

- The Beautiful Phyllis Diller Show
- Get Smart (moved to CBS)
- The Ghost & Mrs. Muir (moved to ABC)
- The Jerry Lewis Show
- The Mothers-in-Law
- My Friend Tony
- The New Adventures of Huckleberry Finn
- The Outsider
- The Saint
- Star Trek

Note: The * indicates that the program was introduced in midseason.
