= List of The Ghost & Mrs. Muir episodes =

The Ghost & Mrs. Muir is a situation comedy that aired on NBC during 1968–1969 and ABC during 1969–1970. The series starred Hope Lange and Edward Mulhare in the title roles; Lange's work was recognized twice with an Emmy Award, once for each.

== Series overview ==
Season	Episodes	Originally released		
Season	Episodes	First released	Last released	Network
1	26	September 21, 1968	March 29, 1969	NBC
2	24	September 18, 1969	March 13, 1970	ABC

== Episodes ==
=== Season 1 (1968–69) ===
No. overall	No. in season	Title	Directed by	Written by	Original release date
1	1	"Pilot"	Gene Reynolds	Jean Holloway	September 21, 1968
Claymore Gregg has had to rent Gull Cottage, the home of his great-uncle, a deceased sea captain whose ghost inhabits the cottage. Claymore has been able to see the captain's ghost since childhood and is often bullied and ridiculed by him. Mrs Muir, her two children, housekeeper, and dog Scruffy arrive and start settling in. The captain talks only to Mrs. Muir's son Jonathan originally. Mrs. Mrs. Muir has her first run-in with the ghost that night. He is a male chauvinist who never married but had a girl in every port, and who died in his sleep when he accidentally kicked the lever on his bedroom gas heater, turning the gas on while the windows were shut. The captain reveals that he wanted to turn the place into a home for retired seamen, but left no will, as he did not expect to die so young. Mrs. Muir does not like his attitude and after they quarrel, she packs the family up and leaves. The captain softens his attitude, as he missed the family and brings them back by taking over the car's steering, Mrs. Muir decides to stay. When the family is asleep, the ghost regrets that she had not been born 100 years ago when he was alive.
2	2	"Haunted Honeymoon"	Gene Reynolds	Bill Idelson & Harvey Miller	September 28, 1968
On their way to get married, Gladys (Yvonne Craig) and Harvey's (Jonathan Daly) car breaks down outside Gull Cottage on a very wet night. Mrs. Muir puts them up, much to the captain's annoyance, as he wants to update his sea charts and Harvey is to sleep in his room. As Claymore is a justice of the peace, the captain gets him to marry the couple so they can sleep together in the spare room.
3	3	"Treasure Hunt"	Hollingsworth Morse	Howard Leeds	October 5, 1968
The water heater breaks down, but skinflint Claymore will not repair it. The captain hits upon a scheme of burying treasure maps around the grounds, so Claymore will fix things as a cover for digging up a supposed treasure.
4	4	"The Ghost Hunter"	Gary Nelson	Joseph Bonaduce	October 12, 1968
Paul Wilkie (Bill Bixby) takes some photos of the house, claiming he is just interested in old houses, but he is really a parapsychologist. After the captain gives him a few nasty surprises, Wilkie comes back with two colleagues to see the ghost he has discovered.
5	5	"Hero Today, Gone Tomorrow"	Gary Nelson	Peggy Elliott & Ed Scharlach	October 19, 1968
Gregg becomes upset when Captain Horatio Figg is named the town hero, as he remembers him as anything but heroic. It turns out that the person proposing it is his great-grandniece (Mabel Albertson), but it is an uphill battle to expose Figg, as there are no records. Note: This episode reveals that Gregg was at the Siege of Veracruz in 1847.
6	6	"Vanessa"	Lee Philips	Joseph Bonaduce	October 26, 1968
A woman (Shelley Fabares) turns up in Schooner Bay with some old love letters from Captain Gregg to her great-great-grandmother. The captain finds himself falling for her, as he did for her ancestor in the 1840s. The woman wants to buy Gull Cottage, which would mean the Muirs would have to leave.
7	7	"The Real James Gatley"	Gene Reynolds	Albert E. Lewin	November 2, 1968
Stafford Repp is an antiques expert. He and his wife want the Gatley barometer in Gull Cottage (the only other one being in the British Museum) and offer Claymore $2,000 for it. He has a copy made and switches it for the original, but the captain, who does not want to part with it, changes it back, which leads the couple having Claymore put in jail for selling them a fake. The barometer mirrors the captain's moods; for example, it reads stormy when he is angry. Note: Dabbs Greer plays recurring character Sheriff Norris Coolidge.
8	8	"Uncle Arnold the Magnificent"	Sherman Marks	Paul Wayne	November 9, 1968
Travelling salesman Jack Gilford visits his relatives at Gull Cottage. The kids want him to stay for the birthday party on the weekend to show off his magic tricks and jokes, but they quickly get tired when the show becomes repetitious and fear the party will be a flop with him there. The captain teaches Jonathan that people should not be discarded just because you are bored of them.
9	9	"Way Off Broadway"	Lee Philips	Albert E. Lewin	November 16, 1968
Claymore decides to put on a play with Mrs. Muir as his leading lady. The captain disapproves, and a mediocre play ends up a success as an unintentional comedy.
10	10	"The Monkey-Puzzle Tree"	Lee Philips	Jean Holloway	November 30, 1968
With threats of her leaving, the captain reluctantly agrees to let Mrs. Muir replace his old furniture to modernize the cottage. But when she has his favorite monkey puzzle tree (which he planted 137 years ago) chopped down, that is too much for him, and it seems that he has left the house for good. Note: The monkey-puzzle tree incident comes from the original R.A. Dick novel and is also included in the 1947 film. Claymore finally is included in the opening titles, but not again until episode 16, which suggests that, though produced later, this episode was shown earlier.
11	11	"Captain Gregg's Whiz-Bang"	John Erman	Peggy Elliott & Ed Scharlach	December 7, 1968
Mrs. Muir needs some money to pay for a new plumbing system, but cannot think of any new stories, so the captain literally becomes a ghost writer. She tones down his risque story lines, but before she can send it off, the captain puts the racy stuff back in and the magazine publisher loves it. However, it does give Mrs. Muir a bit of a reputation. Note: The captain smokes a cigar in this episode and appears as real to a stranger. The publisher is played by Kenneth Mars, who also appeared in a different role in the second season.
12	12	"Madeira, My Dear?"	Ida Lupino	Nate Monaster	December 14, 1968
The captain invites Mrs. Muir for a glass of Madeira wine in his wheelhouse at 4 p.m., but her busy family life means she has trouble getting there every time it is arranged.
13	13	"Love Is a Toothache"	Lee Philips	Howard Leeds	December 21, 1968
Martha starts dating the local dentist (Jonathan Harris), but he turns out to be a mama's boy.
14	14	"Mister Perfect"	Gene Reynolds	John McGreevey	December 28, 1968
Mrs. Muir's old boyfriend (William Daniels) turns up on his yacht and wants to marry her. At first, the captain tries to stop them; then he decides to help them get together.
15	15	"Dear Delusion"	Gary Nelson	Jean Holloway	January 4, 1969
On a weekend visit, family doctor Jim Meade sees Mrs. Muir talking as though someone invisible is there. He gets her to see a psychiatrist, who convinces her that the captain is a delusion. She tries to deny the captain and tells Jonathan to do the same. Note: The captain appears without his beard and mustache as "Danny," a fisherman. "Danny" is listed in the end credits.
16	16	"Dog Gone!"	Oscar Rudolph	Tom August & Helen August	January 11, 1969
Scruffy does not get on well with the captain (though there was no problem in previous episodes). When Scruffy vanishes, Jonathan thinks the captain is to blame. Note: This episode stars Larry Hovis (a regular on Hogan's Heroes).
17	17	"A Pain in the Neck"	Lee Philips	Joseph Bonaduce	January 18, 1969
After a prank by the captain, Claymore slips a disc and cannot be moved, so he becomes a very unwelcome and demanding guest at Gull Cottage. Note: The plot for this episode is based on the story The Man Who Came to Dinner.
18	18	"Strictly Relative"	Hollingsworth Morse	Albert E. Lewin	January 25, 1969
Mrs. Muir's in-laws (Ralph and Marjorie Muir) turn up. They do not like her and the children living in such a remote place and want them to go back to Philadelphia with them. The only way the captain can stop this is to show that she has a man in her life, which means Claymore dressing up and acting like a modern Captain Gregg.
19	19	"Chowderhead"	Hollingsworth Morse	Edward R. White	February 1, 1969
The captain gets upset when he finds his face (from an old photo) is being used to advertise clam chowder. Cecil Kellaway guest stars.
20	20	"It's a Gift!"	Lee Philips	Peggy Elliott & Ed Scharlach	February 8, 1969
The captain is a bit of a bad influence on Jonathan, so the captain decides to buy Mrs. Muir a present to make it up to her. However, he has no money. J. Pat O'Malley stars.
21	21	"Buried on Page One"	John Erman	Peggy Elliott, Ed Scharlach & Paul West	February 15, 1969
To make ends meet, Mrs. Muir gets a job on The Beacon, a weekly local newspaper which once libeled the captain and is run by Richard Dreyfuss, but finds herself doing all the work.
22	22	"Make Me a Match"	Gary Nelson	Howard Leeds	February 22, 1969
Aggie (Alice Ghostley) comes for a visit. A boyfriend has let her down, so Mrs. Muir and the captain try to match her with Claymore.
23	23	"Jonathan Tells It Like It Was"	Gary Nelson	Joseph Bonaduce	March 1, 1969
Jonathan wins an essay competition on John Adams and Benjamin Franklin being friends. The captain tells him they were not and his new account does not impress a descendant, Rutledge Adams, who wants the prize taken away and given to the runner-up.
24	24	"Medicine Ball"	Gary Nelson	Albert E. Lewin & Edith R. Sommer	March 8, 1969
Mrs. Muir has a mystery illness. The captain does not trust the doctor, so he gives her some of his "ague" medicine instead. She dreams and finds herself in a party in the captain's time period.
25	25	"Son of the Curse"	John Erman	Albert E. Lewin	March 15, 1969
The kids find a clock in the attic and start it up, not knowing it has a curse on it, that the last of the Greggs (Claymore) will die by midnight.
26	26	"The Music Maker"	George Tyne	Paul Wayne	March 29, 1969
A musician (Harry Nilsson) stays at the cottage for a few days. The captain has him set a poem he wrote to Mrs Muir to music.

=== Season 2 (1969–70) ===
No. overall	No. in season	Title	Directed by	Written by	Original release date
27	1	"The Great Power Failure"	Jay Sandrich	Dan Beaumont & Joel Kane	September 18, 1969
The cursed ghost ship Sea Vulture drifts into the area and while it remains there, the captain loses most of his powers, so he can do nothing about the women's PTA meeting held at the cottage.
28	2	"Centennial"	Jay Sandrich	Ron Friedman	September 25, 1969
Claymore gives the captain's Georgian tea service (awarded him by the British Admiralty) for a prize at the coming Centennial celebrations at Schooner Bay. The captain makes him win all the events so he can get it back. Candy now knows about the captain. The captain takes over Claymore's body so he can dance with Mrs. Muir.
29	3	"There's a Seal in My Bathtub"	John Erman	William Raynor & Myles Wilder	October 2, 1969
The kids find a seal which has escaped from Aqualand. Claymore and Norrie want to scare it off until they find it is worth money, so they steal it for themselves.
30	4	"Double Trouble"	John Erman	Jean Holloway	October 9, 1969
The captain has been getting rid of Mrs. Muir's suitors. The latest one, Sean Callahan, is his double and claims to be a descendant of the captain. Mulhare played Callahan.
31	5	"Today I Am a Ghost"	Lee Philips	Si Rose	October 16, 1969
An incompetent member of the captain's crew (Dom DeLuise) is now an incompetent ghost and wants the captain to teach him how to scare people.
32	6	"Madam Candidate"	Bruce Bilson	Ben Gershman & Sam Locke	October 23, 1969
The local elections are coming up and the women are fed up with Claymore, who never gets anything done, so they ask Mrs Muir to run against him. Ed Begley stars.
33	7	"Not So Desperate Hours"	Gary Nelson	Arthur Alsberg & Don Nelson	October 30, 1969
Three escaped criminals hide out at Gull Cottage at a time when Mrs. Muir has asked the captain not to interfere, so he does not. Guy Marks and Elisha Cook star.
34	8	"Medium Well Done"	Jay Sandrich	Dee Caruso & Gerald Gardner	November 6, 1969
Mrs. Muir invites a touring medium (Shirley Booth) to the cottage to get a story. The medium then holds a séance to get rid of the captain's ghost. The captain talks of his Spectral Fraternity.
35	9	"Surprise Party"	Gary Nelson	Peggy Elliott & Ed Scharlach	November 13, 1969
The kids want to hold a surprise birthday party for the captain, but how can they make it a surprise when he might be invisible and listening in? Scruffy provides the answer.
36	10	"The Firehouse Five Plus Ghost"	Gary Nelson	Frank Waldman & Tom Waldman	November 20, 1969
Schooner Bay's fire engine No. 17 is as much a joke as the local firemen, with Claymore as their chief. Mrs. Muir thinks the town should get a new engine and gets them to take a proficiency test. Avery Schreiber stars as Fire Commissioner Lilly.
37	11	"The Spirit of the Law"	John Erman	Joseph Bonaduce	November 27, 1969
A power company wants 7/12 of Gull Cottage land to put up electricity pylons on the grounds, and they have the law on their side. Mrs. Muir is willing to go to prison to try and stop them. Jack Burns stars, with J. Pat O'Malley as Judge Hickox.
38	12	"Puppy Love"	John Erman	Jean Holloway	December 11, 1969
Candy falls for the new English boy at her school (Mark Lester), but her tomboy appearance counts against her. She is insulted when he thinks she is a boy. Candy and Mark sing the song "Lavender Blue" together in a dream sequence.
39	13	"Host to the Ghost"	Bruce Bilson	Ron Friedman	December 18, 1969
Mrs. Muir desperately needs some work done on her kitchen. The only way she can get workmen to stay is if the captain leaves for a while, so he goes to stay with Claymore and turns into a very unwelcome guest.
40	14	"The Ghost of Christmas Past"	Jay Sandrich	Jean Holloway	December 25, 1969
For Christmas, the captain gives the Muirs, Martha, and Claymore a dream of when he was alive 100 years ago (they all play parts), loosely based on Scrooge.
41	15	"Ladies' Man"	John Erman	Howard Leeds	January 1, 1970
Cheapskate Claymore does not do well with the ladies, so Mrs. Muir tries to boost his confidence with two friends of hers, but it backfires and he thinks she is after him.
42	16	"Not So Faust"	Lee Philips	Arthur Alsberg & Don Nelson	January 8, 1970
After Claymore tries to cheat Mrs. Muir, the captain decides to teach him a lesson by giving him a dream about an old enemy of his, the Devil. Joe Flynn stars.
43	17	"Tourist, Go Home"	Lee Philips	Dan Beaumont & Joel Kane	January 23, 1970
A millionaire (Kenneth Mars) wants to make the town into a tourist site, starting with the museum. The captain is against it, until he finds out that he will have an important part in it. The revamped museum ends up as a sideshow mocking the captain, which angers him.
44	18	"No Hits, No Runs, No Oysters"	David Alexander	John Fenton Murray & Elon Packard	January 30, 1970
The Oysters are the local baseball team, of which Claymore is the manager. The family and the captain want Jonathan to play for the team, but even he realizes that he is no good.
45	19	"Dig for the Truth"	Lee Philips	Ruth Brooks Flippen	February 6, 1970
The captain tells Candy that his ancestor founded the local grammar school in 1741 instead of another man in 1770, as everyone else believes. She gets in trouble at school when she repeats this.
46	20	"Pardon My Ghost"	Jay Sandrich	Jean Holloway	February 13, 1970
Not realizing he still wants them, Claymore sells some of the captain's possessions, so using Claymore's voice, the captain gives all Claymore's furniture away to a charity shop.
47	21	"Martha Meets the Captain"	Lee Philips	Arthur Alsberg & Don Nelson	February 20, 1970
Martha has to go to Florida permanently to look after her mother. The only way the captain can stop her leaving before her surprise party is to appear to her. The show ends with her staying.
48	22	"Amateur Night"	Jay Sandrich	Arthur Alsberg & Don Nelson	February 27, 1970
After a seaman's home burns down, the captain "persuades" Claymore to donate a warehouse for a new home, but it needs $2,000 to renovate it, so they decide on a benefit to raise the money.
49	23	"Curious Cousin"	Lee Philips	Dan Beaumont & Joel Kane	March 6, 1970
Cousin Harriet (Alice Ghostley) interferes in Mrs. Muir's personal life, so to keep her quiet, Claymore pretends to be her suitor, Captain Gregg.
50	24	"Wedding Day ?????"	Carl Shain	Jean Holloway	March 13, 1970
Cousin Harriet has told Mrs. Muir's parents (Emily and Bradford Williams, played by Jane Wyatt and Leon Ames) about "Captain Gregg". They come to visit and think she is going to elope with him (as she did with her first husband), so they arrange a marriage for her and Claymore.
