= Top-rated United States television programs of 1968–69 =

This table displays the top-rated primetime television series of the 1968–69 season as measured by Nielsen Media Research.

Rank	Program	Network	Rating
1	Rowan & Martin's Laugh-In	NBC	31.8
2	Gomer Pyle, U.S.M.C.	CBS	27.2
3	Bonanza	NBC	26.6
4	Mayberry R.F.D.	CBS	25.4
5	Family Affair	CBS	25.2
6	Gunsmoke	CBS	24.9
7	Julia	NBC	24.6
8	The Dean Martin Show	NBC	24.1
9	Here's Lucy	CBS	23.8
10	The Beverly Hillbillies	CBS	23.5
11	Mission: Impossible	CBS	23.3
11	Bewitched	ABC	23.3
11	The Red Skelton Hour	CBS	23.3
14	My Three Sons	CBS	22.8
15	The Glen Campbell Goodtime Hour	CBS	22.5
16	Ironside	NBC	22.3
17	The Virginian	NBC	21.8
18	The F.B.I.	ABC	21.7
19	Green Acres	CBS	21.6
20	Dragnet	NBC	21.4
21	Daniel Boone	NBC	21.3
21	Walt Disney's Wonderful World of Color	NBC	21.3
23	The Ed Sullivan Show	CBS	21.2
24	The Carol Burnett Show	CBS	20.8
24	The Jackie Gleason Show	CBS	20.8
26	I Dream of Jeannie	NBC	20.7
27	The Smothers Brothers Comedy Hour	CBS	20.6
28	The Mod Squad	ABC	20.5
28	The Lawrence Welk Show	ABC	20.5
30	The Doris Day Show	CBS	20.4
