= List of Animal World episodes =

Animal World was a wildlife television series that aired from June 1968 to September 1971, hosted by Bill Burrud. The series debuted on 16 June 1968 under the name Animal Kingdom, and was renamed Animal World beginning with the 11 August 1968 broadcast.

== Series overview ==
Season	Episodes	Originally released	
Season	Episodes	First released	Last released
1	6	June 16, 1968	July 21, 1968
2	4	May 8, 1969	November 28, 1969
3	9	January 17, 1971	March 28, 1971

== 1968 Season Animal Kingdom ==
No. overall	No. in season	Title	Original release date	Prod. code
1	1	"The Great Migration"	June 16, 1968	1
The mass movement of 500 000 animals across the Serengeti in Tanzania.
2	2	"Secrets of the Desert"	June 23, 1968	2
Wildlife of the Sonora Desert are featured, including ring-tailed cats, tarantulas and Gila Monsters.
3	3	"The Elephants of Tsavo"	June 30, 1968	3
The elephants of Tsavo National Park are featured, along with a close-up look at the orphans cared for by Warden David Sheldrick.
4	4	"A Porpoise with a Purpose"	July 7, 1968	4
The capture and training of a porpoise for Marineland of the Pacific.
5	5	"The Last Safari"	July 14, 1968	5
A search for lions in East Africa leads to a huge lake with two to four million flamingos.
6	6	"Alligator Adventure"	July 21, 1968	6
Game wardens battle poachers in Florida's swampland to protect alligators.

== 1969 season ==
No. overall	No. in season	Title	Original release date	Prod. code
7	1	TBA	May 8, 1969	1
Wildlife in Antarctica, including a Leopard Seal following penguins, the mating rituals of Adélie penguins and Weddell seal pups learning to swim.
8	2	TBA	November 8, 1969	TBA
Elephants Seals, sharks and killer whales and the skills needed to capture them.
9	3	"Bison Roundup"	November 22, 1969	TBA
The Bison's comeback from near of extinction through the efforts at the National Bison Range in Montana.
10	4	TBA	November 28, 1969	TBA
Bill Burrud describes the plight of the Amboseli Game Reserve in Kenya where the once prolific herds of wild animals are slowly falling victims of changing times.

== 1971 season ==
No. overall	No. in season	Title	Original release date	Prod. code
11	1	TBA	January 17, 1971	1
Bats, which comprise the second largest group of mammals on earth and are the only variety to fly, will be examined. Dr. Padro Trebau takes his cameras to a hidden bat cave deep in the Valenzuela and Dr. Robert McLean of the U.S. Public Health Service inspects Bracken's Cave system near San Antonio, the largest roosting cave in North America.
12	2	TBA	January 31, 1971	TBA
Space Monkeys
13	3	TBA	February 7, 1971	TBA
The struggle for survival between the birds and animals of Florida's Everglades
14	4	TBA	February 14, 1971	TBA
A day at a South African waterhole
15	5	"The Alaskan Brown Bear"	February 21, 1971	TBA
16	6	"Care for Injured sea lions"	February 28, 1971	9
17	7	TBA	March 14, 1971	11
Wildlife in the Amazon Jungle
18	8	"Gooney Birds"	March 21, 1971	TBA
Black-footed and Laysan Albatross of Midway Island.
19	9	TBA	March 28, 1971	TBA
The vast Tsavo National Park in East Africa, where elephants are protected from extinction, will be examined.
