= The Ghost & Mrs. Muir (TV series) =

American sitcom

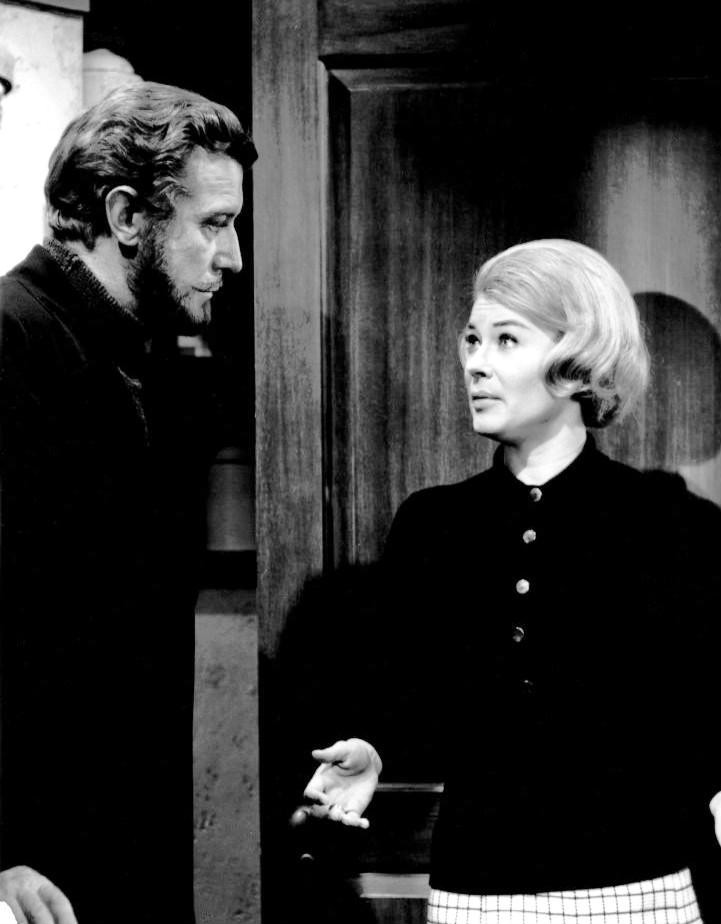
- Edward Mulhare and Hope Lange, 1968
- Genre: Situation comedy
- Starring: Hope Lange; Edward Mulhare; Reta Shaw; Charles Nelson Reilly
- Theme music composer: Dave Grusin
- Country of origin: United States
- Original language: English
- No. of seasons: 2
- No. of episodes: 50 (list of episodes)

Production
- Executive producer: David Gerber
- Producers: Howard Leeds; Gene Reynolds; Stanley Rubin
- Camera setup: Single-camera
- Running time: 30 min.
- Production company: 20th Century-Fox Television

Original release
- Network: NBC (1st season); ABC (2nd season)
- Release: September 21, 1968 – March 13, 1970

Related
- The Ghost and Mrs. Muir (1947 film)

The Ghost & Mrs. Muir is an American sitcom based on the 1947 film of the same name, which was based on the 1945 novel by R. A. Dick. It premiered in September 1968 on NBC. After NBC cancelled the series at the end of its first season, it was picked up by ABC for its second season before being cancelled a final time.

== Premise ==
The series stars Hope Lange as Carolyn Muir, a young widow and writer who rents Gull Cottage, near the fictional fishing village of Schooner Bay, Maine, and moves in with her two children, a housekeeper (played by Reta Shaw), and their dog. The cottage is haunted by the ghost of its former owner Daniel Gregg, a 19th-century sea captain who died in 1869, played by Edward Mulhare. Charles Nelson Reilly plays Claymore Gregg, the captain's great-nephew, who rents the cottage to Mrs. Muir without telling her it is haunted by his ancestor.

Central to the series is the romantic tension between the captain and Mrs. Muir. While they have significant differences, he being a 19th-century chauvinist and she a modern career woman, their mutual attraction enables them to compromise to overcome their differences.

== Production and reception ==
The story was developed as a TV series by Jean Holloway and filmed at the Hollywood Studios. Hope Lange won two Emmy Awards for Lead Actress in a Comedy Series for 1968–1969 and 1969–1970. Despite Lange's consecutive Emmy wins, the show struggled in the ratings and only ran for two seasons. During its first year on NBC, it followed Get Smart; its Big Three competition was My Three Sons on CBS and the first half of The Lawrence Welk Show on ABC.

In spring 1969, NBC cancelled the series. ABC picked it up and scheduled it to be shown on Tuesday nights at 7:30 pm in September 1969, followed by That Girl and Bewitched. The series was again unsuccessful in beating out another hit CBS series, Family Affair. It was later moved to Friday nights at 8:30 pm in January 1970, but ratings did not improve. As a result, ABC cancelled The Ghost & Mrs. Muir in spring 1970. The following year, Family Affair was cancelled by CBS after a five-year run because it was in the same time slot as the NBC hit variety series The Flip Wilson Show.

Reilly was initially engaged just for the first episode rental sequence but, after working with him, Lange recommended to the producers his part become recurring for added comedic opportunities, particularly his terror of the Captain.

== Cast ==
- Hope Lange, as Carolyn Muir, is a widowed writer with two children. She is in her early 30s and finds the captain both overbearing and attractive. She is primarily concerned with caring for her children and her freelance writing career.
- Edward Mulhare, as Captain Daniel Gregg, is a poltergeist, able to affect things not only in the house, but also at a distance, and can appear and disappear at will. He can only be seen and heard by the people he chooses. His bad temper can affect the weather. A sea captain who died in 1869 as the result of an accident that somehow got labeled a suicide, he frequently uses nautical terminology, referring to his home Gull Cottage as his "ship". He does not like visitors in the house and frequently scares them away. He sometimes makes himself visible to the primary characters, usually Carolyn, Claymore and Carolyn's son Jonathan (the dog Scruffy is also aware of his existence), but rarely to others. He typically wears a suit with a turtleneck sweater but on formal occasions, wears the uniform of an 1850s U.S. Navy captain.
- Charles Nelson Reilly, as Claymore Gregg, is the town clerk, among other jobs, a great-nephew of Captain Gregg (although the captain is often ashamed of this and claims that Claymore is not related to him), and Mrs. Muir's landlord. He is greedy and always seeking ways to increase his income. He is one of the few who know of the captain's continued presence, and is usually terrified of his ancestor. Reilly made this terror of "The Captain" a running gag during his appearances on Match Game.
- Reta Shaw, as Martha Grant, is the housekeeper. During most of the series, she is unaware of the ghost, but towards the very end of the series (in episode 47 of 50), the captain reveals himself to her.
- Kellie Flanagan, as nine-year-old Candace "Candy" Muir, is Mrs. Muir's daughter. Starting in the second episode of season two, she can also see and hear the captain.
- Harlen Carraher, as Jonathan Muir, is Mrs. Muir's son; from the beginning, he can see, hear, and talk to the captain.
- Scruffy, as Scruffy, is the Muirs' Wire Fox Terrier.
- Guy Raymond, as Ed Peevey, the local town's handyman. He is in numerous episodes.
- Dabbs Greer as Sheriff Norris (Norrie) Coolidge.

Guest stars include Richard Dreyfuss, Harry Nilsson, Shirley Booth, Yvonne Craig, William Daniels, Bill Bixby, Shelley Fabares, Joe Flynn, Jane Wyatt, Jonathan Harris, Jack Gilford, Kenneth Mars, Alice Ghostley, Mabel Albertson, Leon Ames, Larry Hovis, Cecil Kellaway, J. Pat O'Malley, Guy Marks, Elisha Cook, Jr., and Avery Schreiber.

== Episodes ==
Season	Episodes	Originally released		
Season	Episodes	First released	Last released	Network
1	26	September 21, 1968	March 29, 1969	NBC
2	24	September 18, 1969	March 13, 1970	ABC

== Home media ==
On April 16, 2014, Madman Entertainment released both seasons on DVD in Region 4 (Australia) for the first time. In July 2014, amazon.com started selling both seasons of The Ghost & Mrs. Muir in the United States. On 1 November 2018, Madman Entertainment released the "Complete Collection" box set. This box set contains the same individual Season 1 and 2 sets.

== See also ==
- List of ghost films
