= Jimmy Durante Presents the Lennon Sisters =

- Genre: Variety show
- Written by: Don Reo
- Presented by: Jimmy Durante
- Starring: The Lennon Sisters
- Opening theme: "May We Wish You Well"
- Country of origin: United States
- Original language: English
- No. of seasons: 1

Production
- Camera setup: Multi-camera
- Running time: 48 minutes

Original release
- Network: ABC
- Release: September 26, 1969 – July 4, 1970

Jimmy Durante Presents the Lennon Sisters Hour is an American variety show that aired on ABC during the 1969–70 television season. The series was hosted by Jimmy Durante, and stars The Lennon Sisters.

== Overview ==
Shortly after breaking with long-time mentor Lawrence Welk in 1968, The Lennon Sisters appeared in this weekly series along with comedian Jimmy Durante on ABC in 1969. They appeared with Durante at the piano at the beginning of each weekly telecast with a live audience, and interacted with his guests such as Jack Benny, Phyllis Diller, Dinah Shore, Joey Bishop, The Osmonds, Noel Harrison, Mel Torme, Jo Ann Castle, Jimmie Rodgers, Perry Como, and Bob Hope. The show mostly consisted of the Lennons singing various songs with a bit of comedy skits and dancing sprinkled into the show.

Five episodes into the taping, the sisters' father, William Lennon (who had formerly managed the group), was shot and killed by a deranged former United States Air Force officer, Chet Young, who believed that he was married to Peggy but that William was standing in the way of their relationship.

== Reception ==
The program ran on Fridays from September 1969 until January 1970, when it moved to Saturday nights, until the end of the run on July 4, 1970. Designed to appeal to both young and old alike, the ratings indicated the program had succeeded in doing neither, despite relatively weak competition, including Bracken's World on NBC and movies on CBS.
