= C/F International =

Defunct television program distributor

C/F International was a company that licensed television programming to stations, home video companies and other outlets around the world. Its Businessweek profile stated that, "C/F International, Inc. operates as a worldwide distributor of television and home video programming. It engages in the domestic and international licensing of entertainment and educational programs to broadcast television, cable television, satellite television, home video, digital versatile disc, and other video-related markets. The company is based in Ventura, California."

The company's founder and principal was Burt Rosen, a Christopher Award co-winner, whose reputation was initially established as a television producer. Rosen was also an Emmy Award and a Peabody Award winner.

In later years, the company had been engaged in litigation in relation to ownership and licensing interests involving singer Tom Jones. For example, as of December 2004, C/F International was a secured judgement creditor of Classic World Productions and it principal, Darryl Payne, for approximately one million dollars, and was the principal secured creditor at the time of the subsequent bankruptcy filing by the company. C/F International's action against Classic World Productions and owner Darryl Payne was based on unpaid royalties in relation to the Tom Jones 1969-1971 ITC/ABC variety series, This Is Tom Jones, and related recordings.

C/F International's rights to later Tom Jones material were also subject to dispute. In March 2007, Tom Jones and Tom Jones Enterprises sued C/F International to stop the company from licensing sound recordings made from Jones' 1981 series of variety shows, eponymously titled Tom Jones, which was syndicated in first-run by Rosen's prior company, EPI Limited. It was contended that any rights that C/F International had to license the Tom Jones show did not include the right to make and license separate recordings of the performances on the show. In addition, it was contended that any rights that C/F International had in the Tom Jones show no longer existed, due to numerous breaches of contract. The 1969-1971 This Is Tom Jones television shows are currently sold by Time-Life, rather than by Classic World Productions or C/F International.

In 2008, Burt Rosen died, and the company has subsequently folded. The extent of resolution of the previously referenced litigation is uncertain.
