= Hamilton Records =

- Parent company: Universal Music Group
- Founded: 1958
- Country of origin: United States

Hamilton Records was an American record label started in 1958 as a subsidiary label of Dot Records. It was named after Christine Hamilton, the then-vice president of sales for Dot Records. Performing artists included the Lennon Sisters.

Its catalog is now owned by Universal Music Group and managed by Geffen Records.

== See also ==
- List of record labels
