= Paris 7000 =

- Created by: Richard J. Michaels; Gene L. Coon
- Starring: George Hamilton
- Composer: Michel Colombier
- Country of origin: United States
- Original language: English
- No. of seasons: 1
- No. of episodes: 10

Production
- Executive producer: Richard Caffey
- Running time: 60 minutes
- Production company: Universal Television

Original release
- Network: ABC
- Release: January 22 – March 26, 1970

Paris 7000 is an American adventure drama series that aired on ABC from January 22 until March 26, 1970. The show was a mid-season replacement for Harold Robbins' The Survivors.

== Plot ==
Jack Brennan worked for the State Department at the U.S. Embassy in Paris. If an American found themselves in trouble the telephone number to call for help was Paris 7000. Robert Stevens was Brennan's aide, and Jules Maurois was with the French National Gendarmerie.

== Cast ==
- George Hamilton as Jack Brennan
- Gene Raymond as Robert Stevens
- Jacques Aubuchon as Jules Maurois
- Barbara Anderson as Lee (in "Call Me Lee") and Ellen (in "Call Me Ellen")

== Episodes ==
| No. | Title | Directed by | Written by | Original release date |
|---|---|---|---|---|
| 1 | "A Time for Lying" | Unknown | Unknown | January 22, 1970 |
| 2 | "No Place to Hide" | Unknown | Unknown | January 29, 1970 |
| 3 | "Call Me Lee" | Unknown | Unknown | February 5, 1970 |
| 4 | "Journey to Nowhere" | Unknown | Unknown | February 12, 1970 |
| 5 | "To Cage a Lion" | Unknown | Unknown | February 19, 1970 |
| 6 | "Ordeal" | Unknown | Unknown | February 26, 1970 |
| 7 | "Shattered Idol" | Unknown | Unknown | March 5, 1970 |
| 8 | "Elegy for Edward Shelby" | Unknown | Unknown | March 12, 1970 |
| 9 | "The Last Grand Tour" | Unknown | Unknown | March 19, 1970 |
| 10 | "Call Me Ellen" | Jeannot Szwarc | Richard Bluel | March 26, 1970 |
