= Bryan O'Byrne =

American actor

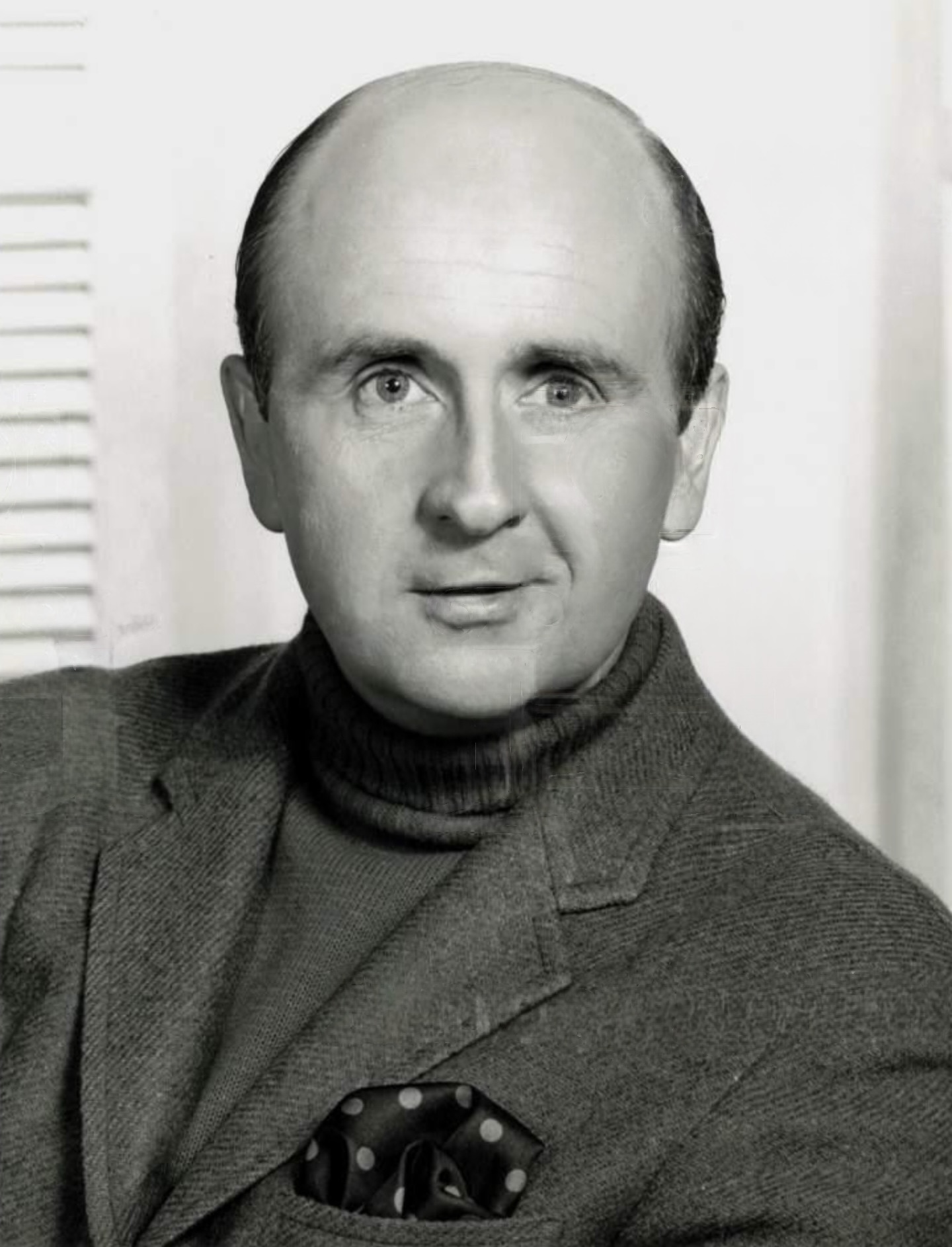
- O'Byrne in Blondie, 1968
- Born: Bryan Jay O'Byrne; February 6, 1931; Plattsburgh, New York, U.S.
- Died: December 4, 2009 (aged 78); Pacifica, California, U.S.
- Occupation: Actor
- Years active: 1958–1991
- Children: 1

Bryan Jay O'Byrne (February 6, 1931 – December 4, 2009) was an American film and television character actor and acting coach. His credits include numerous television shows, films and many television commercials.

== Biography ==
=== Early life ===
O'Byrne was born on February 6, 1931, in Plattsburgh, New York, to Elmer and Bessie M. Ducatte O'Byrne. He was of Irish descent.

He attended St. Peter's Elementary School and Plattsburgh High School. He received his bachelor's degree from Plattsburgh State.

He had one marriage. His only son, Sean Kevin O'Byrne, died young.

=== Acting career ===
O'Byrne had served in the United States Army before becoming an elementary school teacher. He later moved to New York City to pursue acting. O'Byrne successfully entered the profession after starring in the Broadway production of Duel of Angels opposite actress Vivien Leigh in the late 1950s.

He studied acting under Stella Adler and dance with Martha Graham. He resided in the same New York apartment building as actors James Farentino and Marlon Brando, befriending both of them early in their careers.

O'Byrne soon moved to Los Angeles to pursue opportunities in film and television. O'Byrne credits during his career included numerous film and television roles. The Hollywood Reporter described many of his characters as "quiet, milquetoast." Additionally, he appeared in more than 200 television commercials.

He was particular active within the television industry during the 1960s and 1970s. In 1962 O'Byrne appeared as Ned Carlin on the TV western The Virginian in the episode titled "The Accomplice." He appeared in six episodes of Get Smart as Hodgkins, the assistant to the Chief. O'Byrne played Dick Grayson's high school principal in the 1960s Batman television series. He regularly appeared as a mortician in The Munsters, as well as the series Occasional Wife, in which he played the "Man in the Middle," and as Mr. Beasley, the mailman, in Blondie. He made a guest appearance on Perry Mason in 1965 as murder victim Horace Lehigh in "The Case of the Baffling Bug." His other television credits included guest appearances on Alfred Hitchcock Presents, My Three Sons,The Cara Williams Show, Murder, She Wrote, The Bob Newhart Show, Happy Days, The Bill Cosby Show, The Partridge Family, Sanford and Son, Mama's Family and Gunsmoke. O'Byrne's film credits included Spaceballs, Gunfight in Abilene, Marnie, The Shakiest Gun in the West, The Million Dollar Duck, Gus, Love at First Bite, The Apple Dumpling Gang Rides Again and Zapped!.

=== Acting teacher ===
O'Byrne also worked as an acting teacher and coach to many early actors. Much of his instruction emphasized repetition and scene study. Film studios sometimes recommended that younger actors work with O'Byrne to improve their performances.

O'Byrne coached and mentored many then-unknown film and television actors. Forest Whitaker, Jimmy Smits and Lou Diamond Phillips visited his acting classes early in their careers. He also coached acting to Pam Dawber, Christopher McDonald, Bonnie Bedelia, Bill Allen and Marj Dusay.

In particular, O'Byrne is credited with launching the acting career of Nick Nolte. O'Byrne, who often coached college students, was working with Nolte's college roommate at the time. O'Byrne asked Nolte, who was not an actor at the time, to read a scene they were working on. O'Byrne reportedly recognized Nolte's talent and began coaching him as well. Nolte spent nearly a year sleeping on O'Byrne's couch while working with him to become an actor. O'Byrne cast Nolte in his production of The Last Pad, by playwright William Inge, which effectively launched Nolte's professional career.

Professionally, O'Bryne was a member of the Actors' Equity Association, the American Federation of Television and Radio Artists (AFTRA) and the Screen Actors Guild (SAG). He served on the Emmy Nominating Committee, based in Los Angeles.

=== Later life and death ===
O'Byrne retired from acting in the 1990s to care for his sister, Henrietta Bouyea, who was in failing health. He moved to Pacifica, California, after retiring, where he lived for the last sixteen years of his life.

O'Byrne died on December 4, 2009, in Pacifica, California, at the age of 78. His funeral was held at the Church of the Good Shepherd in Pacifica. Actor Christopher McDonald, a close friend and former student, read the eulogy at O'Byrne's funeral.

== Filmography ==
Year	Title	Role	Notes
1962	Alfred Hitchcock Presents	Mr. Tuttle	Season 7 Episode 32: "Victim Four"
1962	The Alfred Hitchcock Hour	Mr. Phelps	Season 1 Episode 7: "Annabel"
1963	The Alfred Hitchcock Hour	Mr. Smith	Season 2 Episode 3: "Terror at Northfield"
1964	Dead Ringer	Mr. Beemas	Uncredited
1964	One Man's Way	Organist	
1965	Fluffy	Gambler	Uncredited
1965	Perry Mason	Horce Lehigh	Season 9 Episode 13: "The Case of the Baffling Bug"
1967	Gunfight in Abilene	Frobisher	
1967	Who's Minding the Mint?	Maxwell	
1971	The Million Dollar Duck	Bank Teller	
1976	Gus	Grocery Store Manager	
1977	The Car	Wally	
1979	Love at First Bite	Priest	
1979	The Apple Dumpling Gang Rides Again	Photographer	
1980	Hero at Large	Scientist	
1982	Zapped!	Father Murray	
1987	Spaceballs	Organist	
1990	Repossessed	Father Stills	
