= The Queen & I (American TV series) =

- Also known as: The Queen and I
- Genre: Sitcom
- Created by: Howard Leeds
- Written by: Arthur Julian; Laurence Marks
- Starring: Larry Storch; Billy De Wolfe; Dave Morick; Pat Morita; Chet Stratton; Carl Ballantine; Dave Willock; Reginald Owen; Liam Dunn; Barbara Stuart; Janet Clark; Natalie Masters
- Composer: Jerry Fielding
- Country of origin: United States
- Original language: English
- No. of seasons: 1
- No. of episodes: 13 (2 unaired)

Production
- Executive producer: Bing Crosby
- Producer: Edward H. Feldman
- Running time: 30 minutes
- Production company: Bing Crosby Productions

Original release
- Network: CBS
- Release: January 16 – April 3, 1969

The Queen & I is an American television sitcom which aired on CBS from January 16 until April 3, 1969. It starred Larry Storch as a junior officer serving a once popular but now aging and run-down cruise ship, the Amsterdam Queen. When he finds out the new owners intend to sell the ship for scrap, he and the rest of the crew involve themselves a number of "get rich quick" schemes in an attempt to save their ship.

Duffy's efforts to raise money often coincided with his gambling and other personal scams. He and the crew were opposed by first officer Oliver Nelson (Billy De Wolfe), the main antagonist, who was highly suspicious of Duffy's activities and often sought to put an end to them.

== History ==
Although Storch and De Wolfe were the main stars, the series had a strong supporting cast that included familiar character actors Liam Dunn, Dave Morick, Pat Morita, Chet Stratton, Carl Ballantine, and Dave Willock. Other supporting roles were played by British actor Reginald Owen and American television actresses Barbara Stuart, Janet Clark and Natalie Masters.

First airing on January 16, 1969, The Queen & I was originally intended to replace the sitcom Blondie midway through the 1968–69 season. Although it received some positive reviews, including being featured on the covers of TV Times and TV Magazine, it failed to catch on with viewers and was canceled after 11 episodes (two episodes never aired). The series, however, served as a prelude to The Love Boat which debuted eight years later.

== Cast and characters ==
- Larry Storch as Charles Duffy
- Billy De Wolfe as First Officer Oliver Nelson
- Carl Ballantine as Becker
- Pat Morita as Barney
- Barbara Stuart as Wilma Winslow
- Dave Morick as Max Kowalski
- Liam Dunn as Capt. Washburn
- Dave Willock as Ozzie

== Episodes ==
| No. | Title | Directed by | Written by | Original release date |
|---|---|---|---|---|
| 1 | "Duffy's Cruise" | Edward H. Feldman | Laurence Marks & Arthur Julian | January 16, 1969 |
Duffy works out a super scheme to keep the ship afloat and its wacky crew members solvent.
| 2 | "The No Cruise-Cruise" | Marc Daniels | Unknown | January 23, 1969 |
After losing $5,000 in a poker game, Duffy agrees to provide the winner with an all expenses paid trip in one of the luxury suites aboard the Amsterdam Queen.
| 3 | "The Promotion" | Unknown | Laurence Marks | January 30, 1969 |
Duffy romances the commodore's secretary as he tries to get meddlesome First Officer Nelson promoted off the Amsterdam Queen and off his back.
| 4 | "Requiem for Becker" | Unknown | Unknown | February 6, 1969 |
All hands conspire to hide Becker from his money-hungry wife ... but a whole new set of problems erupts when it's when it's assumed that the steward has been lost at sea.
| 5 | "Who's Holding the Bag?" | Unknown | Unknown | February 13, 1969 |
Duffy and two smugglers are after First Officer Nelson's little black bag.
| 6 | "Duffy Against the Computer" | Unknown | Unknown | February 27, 1969 |
Duffy tries to short circuit a computer that could show up the crew's incompetence.
| 7 | "Who Am I Talking To?" | Unknown | Unknown | March 6, 1969 |
| 8 | "My Karate Lies Over the Ocean" | Unknown | Unknown | March 13, 1969 |
To bolster the ego of the ship's cook, Duffy pays a karate champ to take a dive in a bout with him. The scheme works too well; the cook becomes an aficionado, and the Amsterdam Queen reverberates with athletic grunts.
| 9 | "Hossfeathers" | Unknown | Unknown | March 20, 1969 |
| 10 | "But to a Captain, Is He a Captain?" | Unknown | Unknown | March 27, 1969 |
Nelson's test run as captain of the Amsterdam Queen puts him on a collision course with Duffy and an old salt who remembers Nelson's World War II boners.
| 11 | "The Trousseau" | Unknown | Unknown | April 3, 1969 |
Duffy promotes a highstakes shuffleboard match between Nelson and Kowalski. Object: providing a Japanese bride with a trousseau.
| 12 | "Don't Make Big Waves" | TBD | TBD | UNAIRED |
| 13 | "Kowalski of Harvard" | TBD | TBD | UNAIRED |
