= The Lennon Sisters =

American vocal group

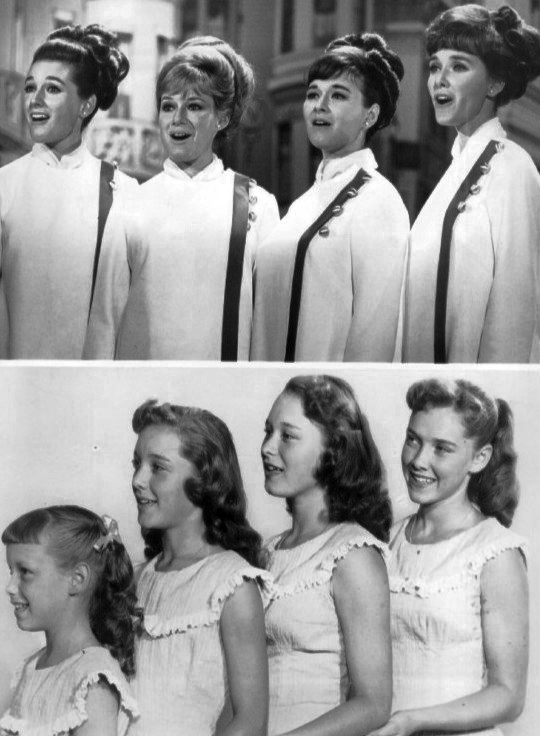
- Lennon Sisters in 1971 (top) and in 1955. 1971, from left: Kathy, Janet, Peggy and Dianne; 1955, from left: Janet, Kathy, Peggy, and Dianne

Background information
- Origin: Venice, California, United States
- Genre: Traditional pop
- Years active: 1955–present
- Labels: Brunswick, Coral, Dot, Mercury, Atlantic, Ranwood, Heartland, Maryco
- Members: Kathy Lennon; Janet Lennon; Mimi Lennon
- Past members: Dianne Lennon; Peggy Lennon
- Website: LennonSisters.com

The Lennon Sisters are an American vocal group that has been made up, at one time or another, of three or four sisters. The quartet originally consisted of Dianne (a.k.a. DeeDee; born Dianne Barbara, December 1, 1939), Peggy (born Margaret Anne, April 8, 1941), Kathy (born Kathleen Mary, August 2, 1943), and Janet (born Janet Elizabeth, June 15, 1946).

From 1955 to 1968, the group appeared regularly on The Lawrence Welk Show (receiving union scale wages) before having their own television variety show, called Jimmy Durante Presents the Lennon Sisters, with Jimmy Durante. After the show was cancelled, they partnered with Andy Williams to create a successful Las Vegas residency, which lasted a decade. In 1999, younger sister Mimi (born Miriam Theresa, October 16, 1955) replaced Peggy upon the latter's retirement. DeeDee has also since retired. The current line-up of the Lennon Sisters is a trio consisting of Kathy, Janet, and Mimi. They continue to tour around the country and, until recently, performed annually with their Christmas show at The Andy Williams Moon River Theatre in Branson, Missouri.

The group was inducted into the Vocal Group Hall of Fame in 2001.

== Early life ==
The Lennon Sisters were members of a family of twelve children, seven girls and five boys. All of the Lennon children were born in Los Angeles, California. A younger sister, Mary Frances, died in 1954 at 16 months old after wandering into the street from the front lawn and being struck by a car. Parents William Herbert Lennon and Isabelle Emily "Sis" Denning married in early 1939. William Lennon worked as a milkman for many years before getting a job at a local golf course. Isabelle Lennon was a housewife, remaining at home to care for the needs of her family. The daughter of Reina Ysabella Alvarez Denning and Danforth Denning, Isabelle Lennon's ancestry was a mixture of Mexican, Spanish, German, and Irish. Her maternal grandfather, Pablo Alvarez, was born in Santa Ana, California, and her maternal grandmother, Margarita Camacho, hailed from Wilmington, California. Pablo Alvarez's great-great-great-grandfather, Bernardo Salgado De Oliberos, was born in San Andrés, Spain. William Lennon died in 1969; Isabelle Lennon died in 2005.

During the sisters' formative years, the family, including one grandmother, lived in Venice, California. Their modest two-bedroom home was located at 1926 Penmar Avenue in Venice. The family later moved to a larger home located at 1106 Garfield Avenue, also in Venice. Devout Roman Catholics, the Lennon family attended the Church of St. Mark, part of the Los Angeles Archdiocese and the Lennon children attended Catholic school. Throughout their career, the sisters credited their religious faith as having a major influence in both their lives. Many of their songs have been either hymns or of a religious nature.

== Career on The Lawrence Welk Show ==
The quartet made its television debut on The Lawrence Welk Show on Christmas Eve 1955. A high school classmate, Larry Welk, son of Lawrence Welk, brought them to the attention of his father. Welk was at home, sick in bed, when his son brought the sisters in to sing for him. Welk was so impressed that he immediately booked them for that week's show, where they were a mainstay until they left to start a career of their own in 1968. The quartet was a trio from 1960 to 1964 after DeeDee married and left the group; she rejoined in 1964 (although making a small handful of appearances throughout her years not on the show). Peggy sang the high harmony, Kathy the low harmony, and Janet and DeeDee sang the middle and lead harmonies. Peggy also specialized in barbershop, or counter-harmony, singing, taught to her by her father (who performed during the Big Band Era in a quartet with his own three brothers). The girls idolized Patti Page's multi-track vocal sound, feeling they achieved something close to her smooth blend in their Dot recording of "Stars Fell on Alabama". Kathy was especially fond of Connie Francis, evident in her solo recording of "Malaguena", which showcased her impressive vocal range. And also with the numerous hairstyles that Kathy would wear like her signature “swept wing look”. The sisters made no secret that they were huge fans of the innovative, intricate musical stylings of both The Andrews Sisters and The Mills Brothers.

Their first hit, "Tonight You Belong to Me", reached No. 15 on the charts in 1956. In 1961, their single "Sad Movies (Make Me Cry)" (Dot 16255) reached the top of the charts in Japan, although making it only to No. 56 on Billboard in the United States. It was the lone No. 1 single of their career, turning out to be their all-time highest-charting record. Although much of the group's fame was based on their television appearances, they also recorded frequently for Dot Records in the 1950s and 1960s, producing a dozen albums, featuring their interpretations of well-known standards such as "Among My Souvenirs", "Moon River", and "Twilight Time". Some of their best-known recordings included "Scarlet Ribbons", "Greensleeves", and Schubert's "Ave Maria". A themed LP titled Dominique featured the Lennon Sisters with their musically talented siblings and cousins performing a variety of 1960s folk songs, including "Where Have All the Flowers Gone" and "If I Had My Way (The Sermon of Samson)", as well as the title track. They recorded briefly for Mercury Records after leaving Dot, focusing on more contemporary pop/light-rock fare, such as "Can't Take My Eyes Off of You" and "Never My Love". Their four most popular albums were Lawrence Welk Presents The Lennon Sisters: Best-Loved Catholic Hymns (Dot); Christmas with The Lennon Sisters (Dot); Somethin' Stupid (Dot);and Noel, their Christmas album for Mercury Records. Their full-bodied, homestyle choral blend was perfect for such yuletide favorites as "Adeste Fideles", "Christmas Island", "Faith of Our Fathers", "The Star Carol", and "Home for the Holidays".

Several souvenir items, such as coloring books, paper dolls, and story books featuring the Lennon sisters, were produced. Having growing families, the sisters were only receiving union scale wages for their jobs on the show. The Lennons and Lawrence Welk would agree that the sisters would appear on the show only once a month starting in 1967 so the sisters could pursue other opportunities and earn a bit more income for their families. However, over time this agreement would not work for Lawrence and in February 1968 the sisters were let go from the show. Singing the song “Sweet and Low” the Lennons and Welk would go their separate ways.

== Father's murder ==
In summer 1969, the Lennon Sisters were filming episodes for their upcoming variety series, Jimmy Durante Presents the Lennon Sisters Hour. After filming five episodes, the Lennon Sisters went on a two-week hiatus. On August 12, 1969, their father, William Lennon, was shot and killed in the parking lot of the Venice Golf Course in Marina Del Rey, where he worked as a private instructor. Shortly before his death, Lennon had retired from managing his daughters' careers; he had been on set at every one of their television appearances, since 1955. William Lennon was killed by a former Air Force officer named Chet Young. Young, who had previously been committed to Atascadero State Hospital and judged to be “dangerously insane”, believed that he was married to Peggy and was convinced that William Lennon stood in the way of his "marriage" to Peggy and had to be eliminated. Two months later, Young used the same weapon on himself to die by suicide. The sisters discovered an unopened letter containing a cut-out of their father, a picture of a gun pointed at his head, and the words "High Noon" (the time of the murder). The sisters were devastated by their father's death. In the wake of the murder, their new show was impacted by this tragedy and lasted only one and a half seasons.

== Later career ==
In the 1970s, the sisters performed regularly on The Andy Williams Show. When that show ended in 1971, the sisters would tour with Williams across the country, with engagements including Caesars Palace in Las Vegas. They had a successful floor show with Williams in Las Vegas for about ten years. They also appeared on several game shows, including Family Feud, Tattletales, and The Hollywood Squares. In the spring of 1982, Larry Welk asked the Lennon Sisters if they would like to perform at the Welk Theater from May until New Year's Eve for the Branson entertainment season. The four sisters moved their families from the Los Angeles area to Branson, Missouri. After the death of Lawrence Welk on May 17, 1992, the Lennon Sisters quartet headlined at the Welk Champagne Theater in Branson from 1994 to 2012. When Peggy retired from singing in 1999, younger sister Mimi took her place, and when Dianne left for a second time in 2001, the act was a trio again for the rest of its run in Branson. They continue to tour across the country and appear annually with their Christmas show at The Andy Williams Moon River Theatre, marking twenty consecutive years of performing in Branson.

Other than their thirteen years on The Lawrence Welk Show, the sister group would appear on many other different shows throughout the years, including The Ed Sullivan Show, The John Davidson Show, The Andy Williams Show, Celebrity Bowling, The Jim Nabors Hour, Cher, Password Plus (Janet Lennon only), Soul Train (As a group in 1980 and 1984, and Kathy alone in 1988 and 1990), and The Merv Griffin Show.

While continuing to play tour dates, Kathy and Janet Lennon have branched out into the toy market since 2006, designing and selling a line of "Best Pals" dolls. In addition to the dolls, the sisters have recorded CDs of favorite children's songs for the "Best Pals" line. The four original Lennon Sisters wrote an autobiography titled Same Song, Separate Voices, first published in 1985, with a new edition in 1995. In 2011, The Lennon Sisters: Same Song, Separate Voices (using the same name as the book), a musical documentary celebrating the group's fifty-five years in show business, aired on PBS, although an updated version of the tv special was aired on PBS in 2020.

Two of their five brothers, Kipp and Pat Lennon, are members of the band Venice, which also includes their cousins Michael and Mark Lennon. The Lennon Sisters have frequented The Villages, the world's largest retirement community, for shows. They last performed in The Villages on February 15, 2016.

== Members ==
Names	Birth date	Spouse(s)
Dianne (Retired)	December 1, 1939 (age 86)	Dick Gass, m. October 16, 1960 – present, three children
Peggy (Retired)	April 8, 1941 (age 85)	1. Dick Cathcart (1924–1993), m. May 24, 1964, six children 2. Robert Felt (1926–2013), m. July 2, 1995
Kathy	August 2, 1943 (age 83)	1. Mahlon Clark (1923–2007), m. June 26, 1967, divorced 1979; 2. Jim Daris (1933 - 2026), m. April 24, 1982
Janet	June 15, 1946 (age 80)	1. Lee Bernhardi, m. May 7, 1966, divorced, three children 2. John Bahler, m. September 25, 1976 – present, two children
Mimi	October 16, 1955 (age 71)	Danny Macias, m. November 5, 1977–present, two children

== Awards ==
In 1987, The Lennon Sisters received a star on the Hollywood Walk of Fame at 1500 Vine Street.

In 2001, The Lennon Sisters were inducted into the Vocal Group Hall of Fame.

In 2022, The Lennon Sisters received the Standard Award from the Great American Songbook Foundation.

== Discography ==
=== Albums ===
Title	Details	Charts
Title	Details	US
Let's Get Acquainted	Label: Brunswick – BL 54031; Format: Vinyl, LP, Mono; Released: 1957	
Lawrence Welk Presents the Lennon Sisters	Label: Brunswick – BL 54039; Format: Vinyl, LP, Mono; Released: 1958	
Sing Twelve Great Hits	Label: Dot Records - DLP 3292; Format: Vinyl, LP, Mono; Released: 1957	
Lawrence Welk Featuring the Lennon Sisters	Label: Coral; Format(s): LP (CRL 57262); Released: 1959	
Christmas with the Lennon Sisters	Label: Dot Records - DLP-25343; Format: Vinyl, LP, Stereo; Released: 1960	95
#1 Hits of the 1960s	Label: Dot Records – DLP 25589; Format: Vinyl, LP, Stereo; Released: 1964	
Melody of Love	Compilation: Label: Hamilton Records - HLP 12119; Format: Vinyl, LP; Released: 1964	
Solos by the Lennon Sisters	Label: Dot Records - DLP 25659; Format: Vinyl, LP; Released: 1965	
Our Favorite Songs	Label: Pickwick Records - SPC 3084; Format: Vinyl, LP; Released: 1965	
Somethin’ Stupid	Label: Dot Records - DLP 25729; Format: Vinyl, LP; Released: 1967	77
On the Groovy Side	Label: Dot Records - DLP 25829; Format: Vinyl, LP; Released: 1967	
The Lennon Sisters Today!	Label: Mercury Records - SR 61164; Format: Vinyl, LP; Released: 1968	
Noel	Label: Mercury Records - SR 61180; Format: Vinyl, LP; Released: 1968	
Pop County	Label: Mercury Records - SR 61201; Format: Vinyl, LP; Released: 1969	
Too Marvelous for Words	Compilation: Label: Vocalion 2 - VL 73864; Format: Vinyl, LP; Released: 1969	

=== Singles ===
Year	Title	Charts	
Year	Title	US	US Cashbox
1956	"Tonight You Belong to Me"	15	—
1957	"Shake Me I Rattle (Squeeze Me I Cry)"	—	—
1961	"Sad Movies Make Me Cry"	56	147
