= Josephine Leslie =

Irish author (1898–1979)

- Born: Josephine Aimee Campbell Rowley; 8 June 1898; Wexford, Ireland
- Died: 28 April 1979 (age 80)
- Other names: R. A. Dick
- Occupation(s): Writer, playwright, novelist
- Known for: The Ghost and Mrs. Muir (novel)

Josephine Aimee Campbell Rowley Leslie (8 June 1898 – 28 April 1979) was an Irish writer, usually under the name R. A. Dick, taking the initials from her sea captain father.

== Biography ==
Josephine A. C. Rowley was born in Wexford, Ireland, the daughter of Robert Abercromby Dick Rowley and Josephine Rosling Rowley. Her father died the same year she was born. Her widowed mother, who was born in Surrey, raised her and her older brother, Edward, in England, specifically in Sunninghill, Ealing and Eastbourne. She attended Princess Helena College.

In 1927, Rowley married civil servant Melville Eric Leslie. They had a son and a daughter. Melville Leslie was a colonial administrator in Nyasaland (Malawi) from the 1920s until 1947. Josephine Leslie died in 1979, at the age of 80.

== Literary career ==
Leslie most famously wrote the 1945 novel The Ghost and Mrs. Muir, which was made into a 1947 film and adapted for a 1960s TV series. She also wrote the novels Unpainted Portrait (1954), Duet for Two Hands (1960), and The Devil and Mrs. Devine (1975) and a play, Witch Errant (1954).

== Selected works ==
- Dick, R. A. (1945). The Ghost and Mrs. Muir. London, White Lion Ltd.
- Dick, R. A. (1954). Unpainted Portrait. London, Hodder and Stoughton
- Dick, R. A. (1954). Witch Errant (a play)
- Dick, R. A. (1960). Duet for Two Hands. Robert Hale
- Leslie, J. (1975). The Devil and Mrs Devine. London, Millington

== Sources ==
- Stetz, Margaret D (1996) "The Ghost and Mrs. Muir: Laughing with the captain in the house", Studies in the Novel, Vol. 28, Iss 1, (Spring 1996), pp. 93–112.
