= The Music Scene (TV series) =

Television series featuring rock and pop music

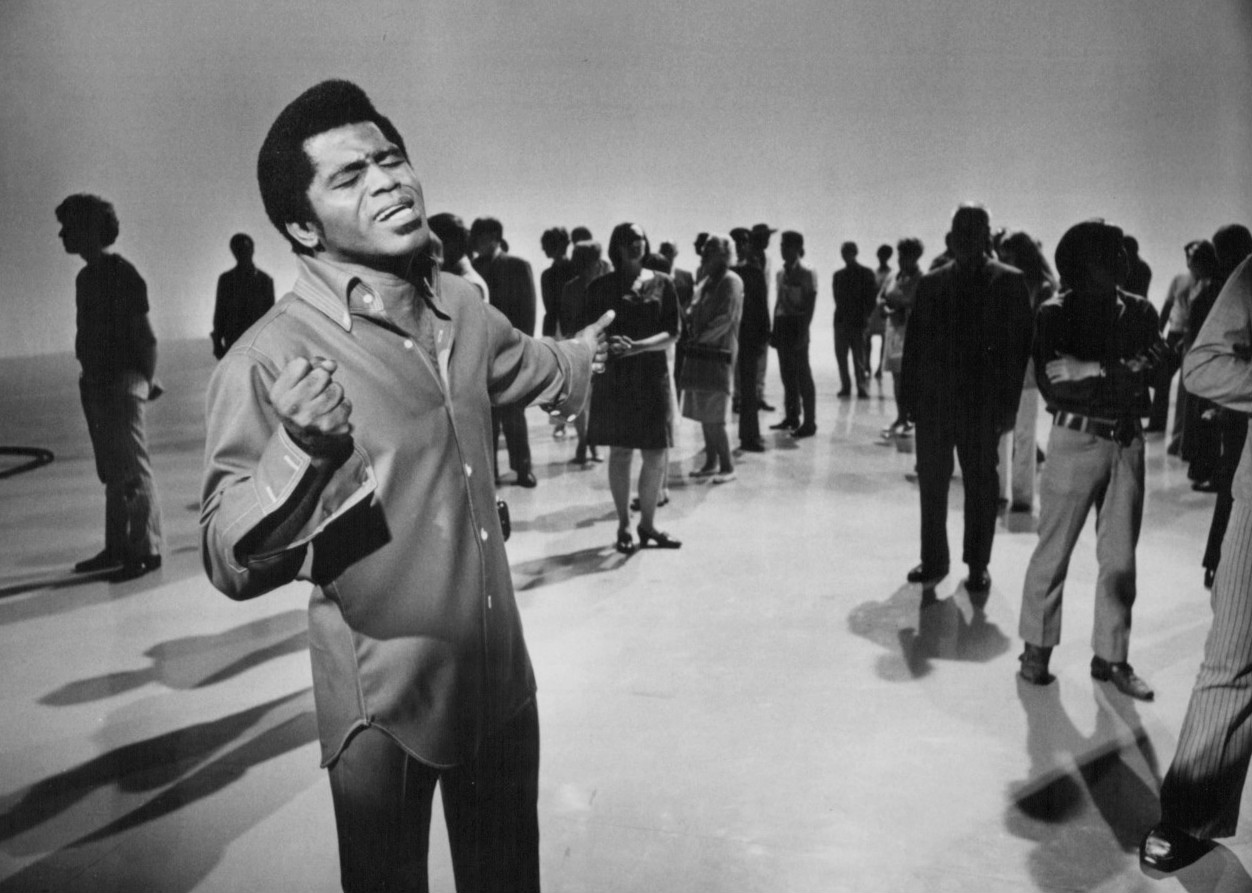
- James Brown performing on the program, 1969
- Genre: Music chart Variety show
- Written by: Carl Gottlieb; Tony Hendra; David Steinberg; Richard Schaal; Stan Jacobson
- Directed by: Stan Harris
- Starring: David Steinberg; Chris Bokeno; Larry Hankin; Paul Reid Roman; Christopher Ross; Lily Tomlin
- Theme music composer: Patrick Williams
- Composer: Patrick Williams
- Country of origin: United States
- Original language: English
- No. of seasons: 1
- No. of episodes: 17

Production
- Producers: Ken Fritz; Stan Harris
- Production location: ABC Television Center in Hollywood
- Running time: 45 min.
- Production companies: Harris/Fritz Productions, in association with ABC

Original release
- Network: ABC
- Release: September 22, 1969 – January 12, 1970

The Music Scene is a television series aired by the ABC Television Network in its Fall 1969 lineup, featuring primarily rock and pop music. The 45-minute program aired Mondays at 7:30 pm. It was paired with a second 45-minute program, The New People, to form a 90-minute block intended to compete with the more popular offering on NBC, Rowan & Martin's Laugh-In.

== Concept ==
The Music Scene was conceived as a musical-variety show with rotating hosts and contemporary rock and pop artists. It led a completely revamped Monday night schedule, reflecting ABC's effort to balance programming that targeted younger viewers with legacy shows catering to an older audience, such as The Lawrence Welk Show.

The odd 45-minute length of the show was designed to break what ABC called the viewers' "almost automatic inclination" to tune in to NBC at 8:00 pm for Rowan & Martin's Laugh-In. The theory was that when The Music Scene was over at 8:15 pm, the network would go immediately into The New People, and Laugh-In would be forgotten.

According to producer Ken Fritz, The Music Scene was to be centered around the latest chart hit records, previewing new artists and their recordings as based on information supplied by Billboard magazine. Stan Harris was director and co-producer. Carl Gottlieb, who had worked on The Smothers Brothers Comedy Hour in the previous television season, was lead writer.

As originally conceived, the broadcast was to showcase popular recordings topping the charts in every major category, which ABC classified as Long Playing Records, Country-and-Western, Rhythm and Blues, Easy Listening, and Comedy Albums. It was later clarified that the show would bridge all formats, including rock. The West Coast comedy troupe The Committee was early slated to serve as host and guide. However, hosting duties subsequently were handed to improvisational comedians, to weave the broadcast of top hits with topical humor. David Steinberg, Chris Ross, and Lily Tomlin were originally selected, with Steinberg signed on as a regular staff writer. Three additional comedians were subsequently chosen to share hosting, Chris Bokena, Larry Hankin, and Paul Reid Roman. Ultimately, Steinberg was named the regular host, and the focus of the comedic element changed to individual humor rather than skit comedy. He was joined by a guest host each week, a performing artist such as Tommy Smothers or Bobby Sherman.

== Advance Promotion ==
In April 1969, producer Ken Fritz previewed The Music Scene to industry executives attending the International Music Industry Conference at Paradise Island, The Bahamas. He made the promotional film available to record companies and other industry organizations for preview showings at record distributor meetings, to highlight the program's ties to the record business. The conference was sponsored by Billboard magazine, which provided the program with chart information on weekly top hits.

Two weeks prior to the television premiere of The Music Scene, a live preview performance of the show was staged in the ABC Television Center, Hollywood. It featured Janis Joplin, John Mayall, Roger Miller, and Three Dog Night. Much of the two-hour concert was recorded for later use on the TV show.

== The launch and reaction ==
Premiering September 22, 1969, The Music Scene, said Billboard magazine, went “into high gear rapidly with the greatest soul singer of them all—James Brown—performing World.” Performances followed by Crosby, Stills, Nash & Young; Buck Owens; Oliver; Three Dog Night; and Tom Jones. The program included a special film segment from The Beatles involving their (censored) performance of The Ballad of John and Yoko, and concluded with a comedic sketch built around the No. 1 tune in the nation, Sugar, Sugar.

Critical reaction to the broadcast was generally favorable. Jack Gould of The New York Times said, “The show was clearly designed for a specific generation, something that apparently may be prevalent in the coming season.” The New York Post’s Bob Williams characterized the show as “a latter day version of The Hit Parade, drawing as it did on the new top pop tunes.” Similarly, Rick DuBrow of The St. Louis Post-Dispatch labeled the broadcast “Hit Parade 1969, sharply aimed at record buyers, a unique, brave attempt to be with it musically.” Billboard’s Claude Hall concluded, “No other show on TV this season contains the same possibilities of communicating with the nation’s youth as does The Music Scene.”

== Lineups ==
Chart movement of songs raised the prospect of repeat performances, and Three Dog Night repeated Easy to Be Hard in a different setting, in the second broadcast of The Music Scene. Other artists to appear that week included Eydie Gorme, Merle Haggard, Janis Joplin, Gary Puckett, and Lou Rawls. Harry Nilsson’s Everybody's Talkin' was featured via a film clip from the motion picture Midnight Cowboy.

Appearing in succeeding broadcasts were Bobby Sherman, Roger Miller, Smokey Robinson & The Miracles, The Dells, The Rascals, Steve Lawrence, Richie Havens, Jerry Butler, Herbie Mann, Moms Mabley, Sonny James, Smith, Judy Collins, Isaac Hayes, Jerry Lee Lewis, Ten Years After, Chuck Berry, Little Richard, R. B. Greaves, Joe Cocker, Johnny Cash, Lulu, and Della Reese.

The sustained appearance of Sugar, Sugar on the charts led music director Pat Williams to compose a gospel-style arrangement for the second repeat of the song. He recruited a chorale of local gospel singers for the performance. The appearance led Warner Bros. Records to record The Music Scene Gospel Singers’ rendition of Sugar, Sugar, as well as When I Die, which had been a top hit for Motherlode earlier in the year.

== Denouement ==
Despite the level of talent presented, The Music Scene did not fare well in Nielsen ratings. The show and its 90-minute block companion, The New People, faced stiff, entrenched competition from the ratings leader, NBC. On September 22, 1969, the evening of the program’s premiere, The Music Scene confronted a triple-barrel offering from ABC's chief competitor. NBC's immensely popular Rowan & Martin’s Laugh-In led off its prime time schedule, followed by hour-long comedy specials featuring Bob Hope and Flip Wilson. The Laugh-In juggernaut continued through the fall. In the New York Nielsen ratings for the week October 2–8, Laugh-In pulled a 31.5 rating, 47 share, compared with the results for The Music Scene: a 9.8 rating and 16 share.

As The Music Scene remained in the bottom third of audience ratings, ABC announced in early November that it was cancelling the show (and its companion, The New People). The Music Scene’s 17th and final broadcast aired January 12, 1970.

Two DVDs of highlights from the show have been released.
