= The Ghost and Mrs. Muir =

1947 film by Joseph L. Mankiewicz

- Theatrical release poster
- Directed by: Joseph L. Mankiewicz
- Screenplay by: Philip Dunne
- Based on: The Ghost and Mrs. Muir by R. A. Dick
- Produced by: Fred Kohlmar
- Starring: Gene Tierney; Rex Harrison; George Sanders
- Cinematography: Charles Lang
- Edited by: Dorothy Spencer
- Music by: Bernard Herrmann
- Distributed by: 20th Century-Fox
- Release dates: May 25, 1947 (London); June 13, 1947 (Miami, Florida); June 18, 1947 (USA)
- Running time: 104 minutes
- Country: United States
- Language: English

The Ghost and Mrs. Muir is a 1947 American supernatural romantic fantasy film directed by Joseph L. Mankiewicz and starring Gene Tierney and Rex Harrison. Based on a 1945 novel written by Josephine Leslie under the pseudonym of R. A. Dick, the film follows a widow in 1900 Whitecliff, England, who develops a unique relationship with the ghost of a sea captain haunting her seaside cottage. George Sanders, Edna Best, Vanessa Brown, Anna Lee, and Natalie Wood appear in supporting roles.

In 1945, 20th Century-Fox bought the film rights to the novel, which had been published only in the United Kingdom at that time. It was shot entirely in California.

== Plot ==
London at the turn of the century: Mrs. Lucy Muir, recently widowed by Edwin, an architect, moves to Whitecliff by the sea, despite her sister-in-law Eva's sharp disapproval, and her mother-in-law Angelica's sadness at Lucy taking away her young daughter Anna, and her loyal housekeeper Martha Huggins. The local estate agent Mr. Coombe reluctantly shows her Gull Cottage, in which she sees the portrait of the former owner, the roguish sea captain Daniel Gregg. They hear a ghostly laugh – Lucy, unafraid, remarks, "Haunted. How perfectly fascinating." Coombe claims that Gregg committed suicide, but she persists in renting Gull Cottage, joking, "it's too ridiculous...in the 20th century, to believe in apparitions."

That night, Lucy experiences odd disturbances. Resolutely, she demands that the ghost show himself. Captain Gregg manifests, explaining his death four years ago wasn't a suicide, but resulted from accidentally kicking the gas heater valve while sleeping. He wants Gull Cottage to house retired seamen, thus he frightens away other tenants. Due to Lucy's headstrong attitude, and her appreciation of the house, Daniel reluctantly agrees to allow her to remain, promising to materialize only to her.

Eva and Angelica visit, wanting Lucy to move back to London, as Lucy's gold mine investment — her only source of income — has "petered out" and "stopped paying dividends." However Daniel, having warmed to her, asks her to stay, suggesting her in-laws should "shove off." They decide to write a book from which she can profit; a dictation of his ocean-going memoirs. While writing the book, they fall in love. Realizing it's hopeless, Daniel urges Lucy to find a living man. Lucy meets London publisher Mr. Sproule, encountering Miles Fairley, a suave author of children's books under the pen name Uncle Neddy. Sproule agrees to publish Daniel's lurid and sensational recollections, titled Blood and Swash, providing Lucy with an advance to buy Gull Cottage.

Fairley follows her back to Whitecliff and they begin a whirlwind courtship. Though initially jealous of their relationship, Daniel decides to leave, as he considers himself an obstacle to Lucy's chance at happiness. While she sleeps, he imparts a mental suggestion that she alone wrote the book, and his presence was merely a dream. After declaring regret about never having had a life with her, he fades away.

Fairley cancels a planned visit to Gull Cottage, saying he will be in London for a few days. Lucy visits London to sign a contract, and obtains Fairley's address in the city from the office clerk to pay a surprise visit. She discovers that Fairley is already married with two children, and Mrs. Fairley sympathetically tells her, she's not Fairley's first extramarital affair. Heartbroken, Lucy returns to Whitecliff to spend the rest of her life as a recluse, with Martha looking after her.

Years later, Mrs. Fairley has had enough of her husband's philandering and divorces him, taking full custody of their children. Anna goes to university and returns with a Royal Navy lieutenant she plans to marry. Anna reveals to her mother that she knew about her mother's relationship with "Uncle Neddy", and that she believes that she too saw Daniel, whom she regarded as a childhood crush, meaning Daniel broke his promise to Lucy not to show himself. Anna argues that Daniel must be real since they both saw him, but Lucy still believes that it was a dream and reasons it is more logical to conclude that she transmitted her dream to Anna through her stories than to believe in ghosts. She also tells Anna that although she had at times been lonely, she was never truly alone.

Many years later, the elderly Lucy is now ailing, and Anna's daughter (also named Lucy) is engaged to an airplane captain; Anna believes that affection for captains runs in their family. Lucy rejects the glass of hot milk Martha has brought for her with a complaint that she is tired. After Martha leaves the room, Lucy dies. Daniel returns and approaches her, whispering that she will never be tired again. Taking his hands, her young spirit leaves her aged body and greets him with a loving smile. Unseen by Martha, the couple leave the house and walk arm-in-arm into an ethereal mist.

== Cast ==
- Gene Tierney as Lucy Muir
- Rex Harrison as Captain Daniel Gregg
- George Sanders as Miles Fairley
- Edna Best as Martha Huggins
- Vanessa Brown as Anna Muir
  - Natalie Wood as young Anna Muir
- Anna Lee as Mrs. Fairley
- Robert Coote as Mr. Coombe
- Isobel Elsom as Angelica Muir, Lucy's mother-in-law
- Victoria Horne as Eva Muir, Lucy's sister-in-law
- Whitford Kane as Mr. Sproule, the publisher (uncredited)
- Stuart Holmes as Man ordered out of train compartment by the Captain (uncredited)

== Production ==
=== Casting ===
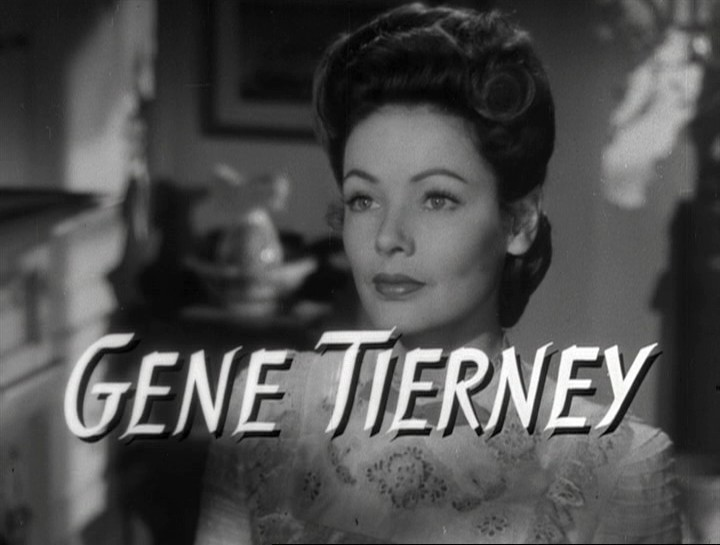
Tierney in the trailer

Initially, June Lockhart and Richard Ney were cast in the roles of Anna and Miles Fairley, respectively, but Ney had to leave due to scheduling conflicts with another film, Ivy (1947). (Note: According to Lee Server's book Screenwriter: Words Become Pictures, Sanders' casting came about when Ney was fired for being inadequate in the part.) Darryl F. Zanuck, the studio production chief, had originally envisioned John M. Stahl as the director, praising his work on Holy Matrimony (1943) for its similar English humor and sentiment. Zanuck also considered Norma Shearer for the role of Lucy.

=== Filming ===
Principal photography of The Ghost and Mrs. Muir took place between November 29, 1946 and early March 1947. Filming locations included Palos Verdes and Monterey, California. Some scenes were filmed in February 1947 on a beach near Stillwater Cove in Pebble Beach. Production was temporarily halted when Gene Tierney broke her foot, but she completed filming with a cast hidden by her costume. Charles Lang Jr. was brought in from Paramount for the production.

Although Joseph Mankiewicz had a good reputation as a screenwriter, Philip Dunne says Mankiewicz's only contribution to this script was writing a couple of "excellent lines" for George Sanders' character. Bernard Herrmann, the composer of the film's music, regarded it as his finest score.

== Release ==
The Ghost and Mrs. Muir opened in London on May 25, 1947.

=== Home media ===
The Ghost and Mrs. Muir was released on both VHS and Laserdisc by CBS/Fox Video in 1990. Fox Video released it on VHS in 1994 and DVD in 2003, in both cases as part of the 20th Century Fox Studio Classics collection. The DVD version includes new audio commentaries, the original theatrical trailer, and the A&E documentary Rex Harrison: The Man Who Would Be King as bonus content. The film was released on Blu-ray in 2013 by 20th Century Fox under Fox Studio Classics after being selected in Fox's Voice Your Choice promotion.

== Reception ==
=== Critical response ===
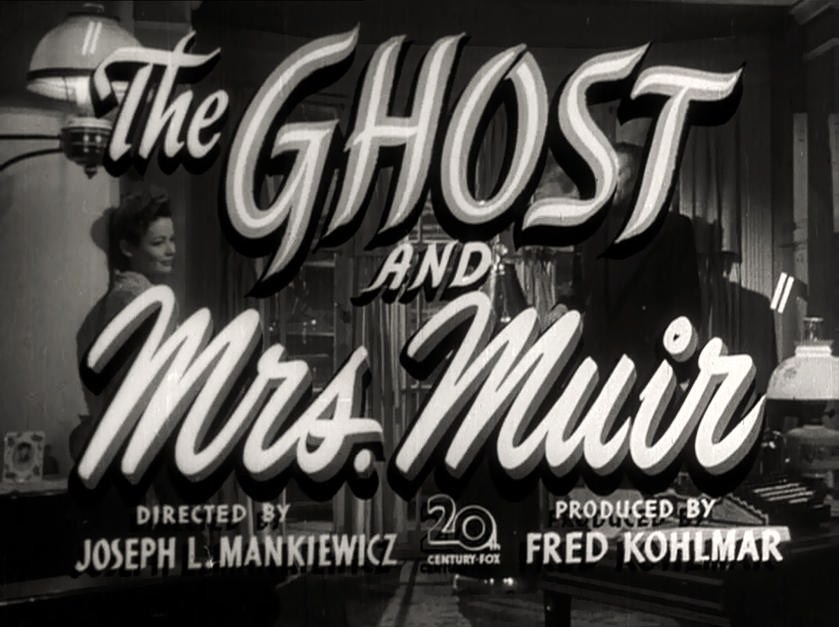
Title card from the film trailer

The film critic at The New York Times called The Ghost and Mrs. Muir "a pleasurable film, despite its failings," singling out Edna Best for "by far the best performance". In the writer's opinion, Harrison "has such an ingratiating personality that this compensates in large measure for the lack of characterization in his role," but Tierney "is a pretty girl, but has no depth of feeling as an actress."

Variety, on the other hand, praised the actors and the film unreservedly:

Gene Tierney gives, what undoubtedly is her best performance to date. It’s warmly human and the out-of-this-world romance pulls audience sympathy with an infectious tug that never slackens. In his role as the lusty, seafaring shade, Rex Harrison commands the strongest attention. Philip Dunne’s script lards the R. A. Dick novel with gusty humor and situations that belie the ghostly theme. Dialog makes full use of salty expressions to point up chuckles.

The film holds a 100% rating on Rotten Tomatoes based on 21 reviews, with an average rating of 8.4/10. Rotten Tomatoes summarizes the consensus as, "The Ghost and Mrs. Muir deftly handles a multitude of tones to deliver a haunting love story in classical fashion."

=== Accolades ===
Lang was nominated for Best Cinematography, Black-and-White at the 20th Academy Awards.

The film was ranked 73rd on AFI's 100 Years...100 Passions list in 2002 by the American Film Institute.

== Adaptations to other media ==
The Ghost and Mrs. Muir was adapted as an hour-long radio play on the December 1, 1947 broadcast of Lux Radio Theater with Charles Boyer and Madeleine Carroll and on the August 16, 1951 Screen Directors Playhouse with Boyer and Jane Wyatt. A 90-minute adaptation by Barry Campbell of the novel was broadcast on BBC Radio 4 on 21 December 1974 with Bryan Pringle as Captain Gregg, Gemma Jones as Lucy Muir and Philip Bond as Miles.

From 1968 to 1970, a TV series titled The Ghost & Mrs. Muir, starring Hope Lange and Edward Mulhare, aired on NBC and then ABC. It had the same premise and main characters as the book and film, but it was a situation comedy, downplaying the romantic fantasy elements and focusing on broad humor. The time and setting were changed, with the action taking place in a contemporary American coastal town (although the ghost was portrayed as being from the Victorian era). For the series, Mrs. Muir's first name was changed from Lucy to Carolyn, and the children's names were changed from Cyril and Anna (in the original novel) to Jonathan and Candace.

In April 1994, Variety continued its reporting on Sean Connery's being slated to play the Captain in a version of the story for 20th Century Fox. The project was reportedly still “in the pipeline” in 1997, but the remake never came about.

On June 3, 2005, a musical adaptation based on the film and the book, written and directed by James J. Mellon, had its world premiere at the NoHo Arts Center in Los Angeles. Variety gave it a mixed review.

As of August 2026, a new musical adaptation of the novel is in development by producer Kenneth Hoyt. The writing team is Peter Sham (book and lyrics) and Kevin Purcell (music).

== See also ==
- List of ghost films

== Sources ==
- Cooper, David (2005). Bernard Herrmann's The Ghost and Mrs Muir. Lanham, Maryland: Scarecrow Press. ISBN 978-6-613-96975-0.
- Server, Lee (1987). Screenwriter: Words Become Pictures. Pittstown, New Jersey: The Main Street Press. ISBN 978-1-555-62018-9.
