= Harold Robbins' The Survivors =

American television series

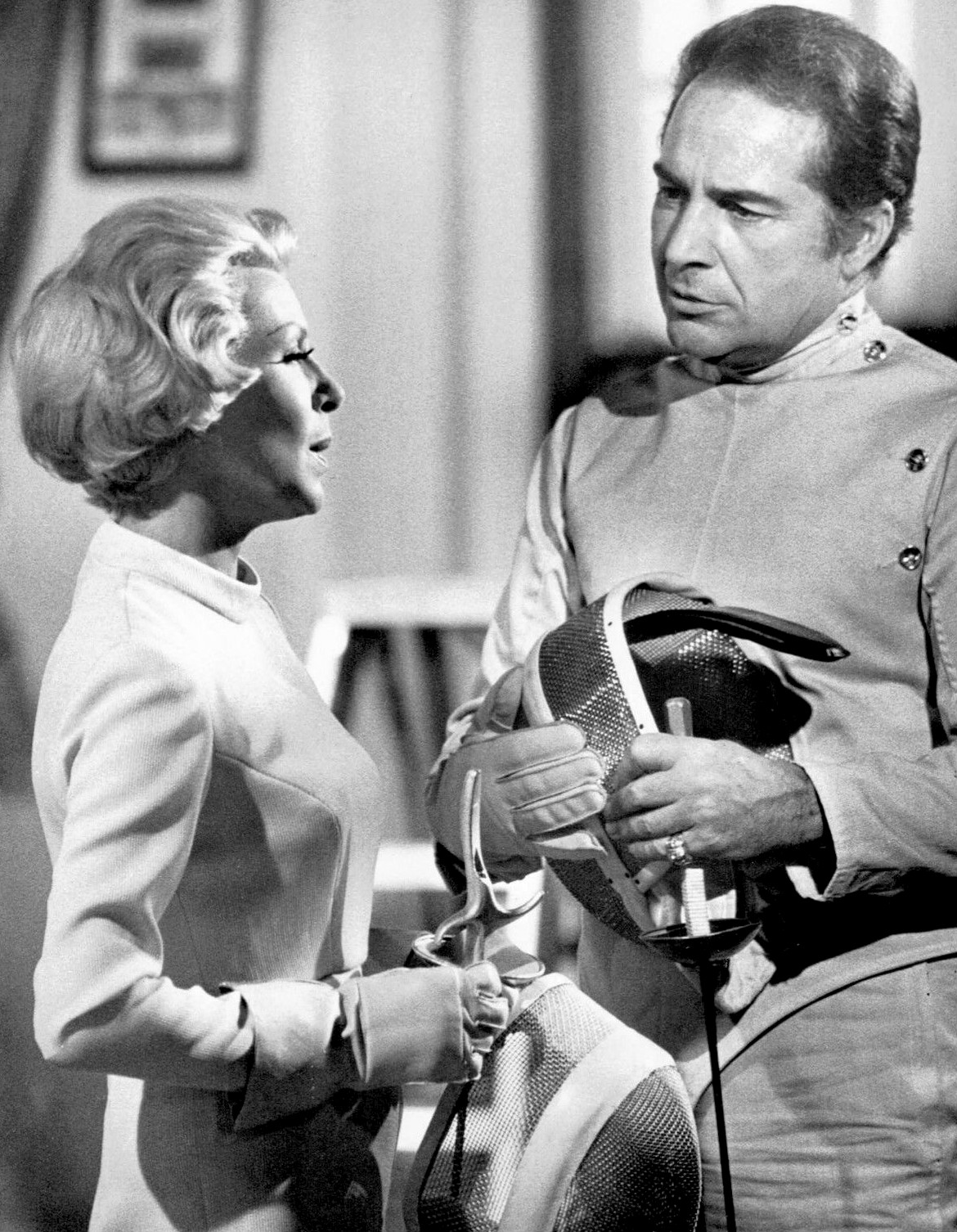
- Rossano Brazzi and Lana Turner in a scene
- Also known as: The Survivors
- Genre: Soap opera
- Created by: Richard De Roy; Michael Gleason; Harold Robbins
- Starring: Lana Turner; George Hamilton; Diana Muldaur; Ralph Bellamy; Natalie Schafer; Kevin McCarthy; Jan-Michael Vincent; Clu Gulager; Louis Hayward
- Country of origin: United States
- Original language: English
- No. of seasons: 1
- No. of episodes: 15

Production
- Running time: 60 minutes
- Production company: Universal Television

Original release
- Network: ABC
- Release: 22 September 1969 – 17 September 1970

Harold Robbins' The Survivors is an American primetime soap opera aired by the ABC television network as part of its fall 1969 lineup.

== Series overview ==
The series was based on the book of the same title written by bestselling author Harold Robbins, who was credited as a cocreator and wrote the script for the series debut.

Hollywood film star Lana Turner made her only television appearance as a regular series character on The Survivors. The show also starred Jan-Michael Vincent, Ralph Bellamy, Diana Muldaur, George Hamilton, Louis Hayward, Kevin McCarthy, Clu Gulager and Natalie Schafer. However, the program was a ratings failure, losing badly to Mayberry R.F.D. and The Doris Day Show on CBS and The NBC Monday Movie on NBC. It was canceled at midseason, although it was rerun the following summer.

== Cast and characters ==
Starring

- George Hamilton as Duncan Carlyle
- Kevin McCarthy as Philip Hastings
- Ralph Bellamy as Baylor Carlyle (eps. 1–11)
- Rossano Brazzi as Antaeus Riakos
- and Lana Turner as Tracy Carlyle Hastings

Co-starring

- Louis Hayward as Jonathan Carlyle
- Diana Muldaur as Belle Wheeler
- Louise Sorel as Jean Vale
- Jan-Michael Vincent as Jeffrey Hastings
- Robert Lipton as Tom Steinberg
- Kathy Cannon as Sheila Riley

Guest starring

- Robert Viharo as Miguel Santerra
- Donna Bacalla as Marguerita
- Pamela Tiffin as Rosemary Price
- Michael Bell as Corbett
- Clu Gulager as Senator Mark Jennings

== Episodes ==
No.	Title	Directed by	Written by	Original release date	Viewers (millions)
1	"Chapter One"	Michael Ritchie	Harold Robbins	September 29, 1969	14.2
Baylor Carlyle demands the resignation of his son-in-law Philip Hastings because of embezzlement. Also stars Celeste Yarnall and Jean-Paul Vignon.
2	"Chapter Two"	Paul Henreid	Preston Wood	October 6, 1969	13.9
Baylor learns that he only has a short time to live and decides to bring Duncan into the bank.
3	"Chapter Three"	Frank McDonald	Arthur Weiss	October 13, 1969	12.3
Baylor grants Duncan's request for a bank loan to Miguel Santerra after meeting with the revolutionary. Also stars Larry Hovis and Jean Hale.
4	"Chapter Four"	Paul Wendkos	Odie Hawkins & Arthur Weiss	October 20, 1969	13.1
Tracy and Antaeus meet again after a twenty-year absence. Also stars Parley Baer.
5	"Chapter Five"	Ralph Levy	Steffi Barrett	October 27, 1969	12.7
Jeff leaves home to go live with his friends Tom and Sheila. Also stars Roger Garrett.
6	"Chapter Six"	H. Bruce Humberstone	Steffi Barrett	November 10, 1969	9.1
Philip offers Tracy a divorce in exchange for her share of the bank when Baylor dies.
7	"Chapter Seven"	Marc Daniels	Story by : Jo Pagano & Arthur Weiss; Teleplay by : Steffi Barrett & Stuart Jerome	November 17, 1969	8.7
Philip discovers that the Carlyle Bank has financed Santerra's revolution. Also stars David Cassidy and Zalman King.
8	"Chapter Eight"	Anton Leader	Norman Paul	November 24, 1969	9.5
Tracy tells Jeff that Philip is not his father.
9	"Chapter Nine"	Lee Philips	Preston Wood	December 1, 1969	14.7
Riakos tells Senator Jennings (Clu Gulager) of the Carlyle Bank's involvement in the Santerra revolution. Also stars Burr DeBenning and Schell Rasten.
10	"Chapter Ten"	Lewis Allen	D.C. Fontana & Norman Paul	December 8, 1969	10.2
Baylor is subpoenaed to testify before the Senate about his bank loan to Santerra's revolutionary group. Also stars Max Kleven, Bartlett Robinson and James B. Sikking.
11	"Chapter Eleven"	Paul Henreid	Story by : Walter Doniger; Teleplay by : Norman Katkov	December 15, 1969	9.5
Duncan finds Baylor dead. Also stars S. John Launer and George Fenneman.
12	"Chapter Twelve"	unknown	unknown	December 22, 1969	unknown
Duncan tells Tracy he suspects Philip of murder.
13	"Chapter Thirteen"	Lewis Allen	unknown	December 29, 1969	11.6
The reading of Baylor's will is interrupted by the appearance of his widow, Eleanor (Natalie Schafer). Also stars Paul Stewart and Michael Ansara.
14	"Chapter Fourteen"	unknown	unknown	January 5, 1970	11.8
Philip announces that he and Eleanor will fight Baylor's will.
15	"Chapter Fifteen"	unknown	unknown	January 12, 1970	11.5
Duncan is injured in an automobile accident, and in the subsequent investigation, police find that it was no accident.

== Television film ==
A made-for-TV-movie was filmed in 1971 based on the series titled The Last of the Powerseekers. Universal Television decided to re-edit two of The Survivors episodes into the TV movie.
