= 1968–69 United States network television schedule =

The following is the 1968–69 network television schedule for the three major English language commercial broadcast networks in the United States. The schedule covers primetime hours from September 1968 through August 1969. The schedule is followed by a list per network of returning series, new series, and series cancelled after the 1967–68 season.

New fall series are highlighted in bold.

Each of the 30 highest-rated shows is listed with its rank and rating as determined by Nielsen Media Research.

Yellow indicates the programs in the top 10 for the season.
Cyan indicates the programs in the top 20 for the season.
Magenta indicates the programs in the top 30 for the season.

National Educational Television (NET) was in operation, but the schedule was set by each local station.

== Sunday ==
| Network | | 7:00 PM | 7:30 PM | 8:00 PM | 8:30 PM | 9:00 PM | 9:30 PM | 10:00 PM | 10:30 PM |
|---|---|---|---|---|---|---|---|---|---|
| ABC | | **Land of the Giants** | | The F.B.I. (18/21.7) | | The ABC Sunday Night Movie | | | |
| CBS | Fall | Lassie | Gentle Ben | The Ed Sullivan Show (23/21.2) | | The Smothers Brothers Comedy Hour (27/20.6) | | Mission: Impossible (11/23.3) (Tied with Bewitched and The Red Skelton Hour) | |
| CBS | Summer | Lassie | Gentle Ben | The Ed Sullivan Show (23/21.2) | | **Hee Haw** | | Mission: Impossible (11/23.3) (Tied with Bewitched and The Red Skelton Hour) | |
| NBC | Fall | **The New Adventures of Huckleberry Finn** | Walt Disney's Wonderful World of Color (21/21.3) (Tied with Daniel Boone) | | The Mothers-in-Law | Bonanza (3/26.6) | | **The Beautiful Phyllis Diller Show** | |
| NBC | Winter | **The New Adventures of Huckleberry Finn** | Walt Disney's Wonderful World of Color (21/21.3) (Tied with Daniel Boone) | | The Mothers-in-Law | Bonanza (3/26.6) | | **My Friend Tony** | |

== Monday ==
| Network | | 7:30 PM | 8:00 PM | 8:30 PM | 9:00 PM | 9:30 PM | 10:00 PM | 10:30 PM |
|---|---|---|---|---|---|---|---|---|
| ABC | Fall | The Avengers | | Peyton Place | **The Outcasts** | | The Big Valley | |
| ABC | Summer | The Avengers | | The Guns of Will Sonnett | **The Outcasts** | | **The Dick Cavett Show** | |
| CBS | Fall | Gunsmoke (6/24.9) | | **Here's Lucy** (9/23.8) | **Mayberry R.F.D.** (4/25.4) | Family Affair (5/25.2) | The Carol Burnett Show (24/20.8) (Tied with The Jackie Gleason Show) | |
| CBS | Summer | Gunsmoke (6/24.9) | | The Lucy Show (R) | **Mayberry R.F.D.** (4/25.4) | Family Affair (5/25.2) | **Carol Burnett Presents the Jimmie Rodgers Show** | |
| NBC | | I Dream of Jeannie (26/20.7) | Rowan & Martin's Laugh-In (1/31.8) | | NBC Monday Night at the Movies | | | |

== Tuesday ==
| Network | | 7:30 PM | 8:00 PM | 8:30 PM | 9:00 PM | 9:30 PM | 10:00 PM | 10:30 PM |
|---|---|---|---|---|---|---|---|---|
| ABC | Fall | **The Mod Squad** (28/20.5) (Tied with The Lawrence Welk Show) | | It Takes a Thief | | N.Y.P.D. | **That's Life** | |
| ABC | Summer | **The Mod Squad** (28/20.5) (Tied with The Lawrence Welk Show) | | It Takes a Thief | | N.Y.P.D. | **The Dick Cavett Show** | |
| CBS | Fall | **Lancer** | | The Red Skelton Hour (11/23.3) (Tied with Mission: Impossible and Bewitched) | | **The Doris Day Show** (30/20.4) | CBS News Hour / **60 Minutes** | |
| CBS | Summer | **Lancer** | | **The Liberace Show** | | **The Doris Day Show** (30/20.4) | CBS News Hour / **60 Minutes** | |
| NBC | Fall | The Jerry Lewis Show | | **Julia** (7/24.6) | NBC Tuesday Night at the Movies | | | |
| NBC | Summer | Star Trek | | **Julia** (7/24.6) | NBC Tuesday Night at the Movies | | | |

== Wednesday ==
| Network | | 7:30 PM | 8:00 PM | 8:30 PM | 9:00 PM | 9:30 PM | 10:00 PM | 10:30 PM |
|---|---|---|---|---|---|---|---|---|
| ABC | Fall | **Here Come the Brides** | | Peyton Place (*) | The ABC Wednesday Night Movie | | | |
| ABC | Spring | **Here Come the Brides** | | The King Family Show | The ABC Wednesday Night Movie | | | |
| CBS | Fall | Daktari | | **The Good Guys** | The Beverly Hillbillies (10/23.5) | Green Acres (19/21.6) | The Jonathan Winters Show | |
| CBS | Winter | **The Glen Campbell Goodtime Hour** (15/22.5) | | **The Good Guys** | The Beverly Hillbillies (10/23.5) | Green Acres (19/21.6) | **Hawaii Five-O** | |
| CBS | Summer | Tarzan (R) | | **The Good Guys** | The Beverly Hillbillies (10/23.5) | Green Acres (19/21.6) | **Hawaii Five-O** | |
| NBC | | The Virginian (17/21.8) | | | Kraft Music Hall | | **The Outsider** | |

(*) Turn-On aired in this time period on February 5, 1969, only.

Tarzan on CBS consisted of reruns from the 1966-68 NBC series.

== Thursday ==
| Network | | 7:30 PM | 8:00 PM | 8:30 PM | 9:00 PM | 9:30 PM | 10:00 PM | 10:30 PM |
|---|---|---|---|---|---|---|---|---|
| ABC | Fall | **The Ugliest Girl in Town** | The Flying Nun | Bewitched (11/23.3) (Tied with Mission: Impossible and The Red Skelton Hour) | That Girl | **Journey to the Unknown** | | Local |
| ABC | Winter | The Flying Nun | That Girl | Bewitched (11/23.3) (Tied with Mission: Impossible and The Red Skelton Hour) | **What's It All About, World?** | | Local | |
| ABC | Summer | The Flying Nun | That Girl | Bewitched (11/23.3) (Tied with Mission: Impossible and The Red Skelton Hour) | **This is Tom Jones** | | Local | |
| CBS | Fall | **Blondie** | **Hawaii Five-O** | | CBS Thursday Night Movie | | | |
| CBS | Winter | **The Queen & I** | The Jonathan Winters Show | | CBS Thursday Night Movie | | | |
| CBS | Summer | Animal World | The Prisoner | | CBS Thursday Night Movie | | | |
| NBC | Fall | Daniel Boone (21/21.3) (Tied with Walt Disney's Wonderful World of Color) | | Ironside (16/22.3) | | Dragnet 1969 (20/21.4) | The Dean Martin Show (8/24.1) | |
| NBC | July | Daniel Boone (21/21.3) (Tied with Walt Disney's Wonderful World of Color) | | Ironside (16/22.3) | | Dragnet 1969 (20/21.4) | Dean Martin Presents the Golddiggers | |

== Friday ==
| Network | | 7:30 PM | 8:00 PM | 8:30 PM | 9:00 PM | 9:30 PM | 10:00 PM | 10:30 PM |
|---|---|---|---|---|---|---|---|---|
| ABC | Fall | Operation: Entertainment | | Felony Squad | **The Don Rickles Show** | The Guns of Will Sonnett | Judd, for the Defense | |
| ABC | Winter | **This is Tom Jones** | | **The Generation Gap** | Let's Make a Deal | The Guns of Will Sonnett | Judd, for the Defense | |
| ABC | Summer | Let's Make a Deal | **The John Davidson Show** | | Judd, for the Defense | | **The Dick Cavett Show** | |
| CBS | | The Wild Wild West | | Gomer Pyle, U.S.M.C. (2/27.2) | The CBS Friday Night Movie | | | |
| NBC | Fall | The High Chaparral | | **The Name of the Game** | | | Star Trek | |
| NBC | Summer | The High Chaparral | | **The Name of the Game** | | | The Saint | |

== Saturday ==
| Network | | 7:30 PM | 8:00 PM | 8:30 PM | 9:00 PM | 9:30 PM | 10:00 PM | 10:30 PM |
|---|---|---|---|---|---|---|---|---|
| ABC | Fall | The Dating Game | The Newlywed Game | The Lawrence Welk Show (28/20.5) (Tied with The Mod Squad) | | The Hollywood Palace | | Local |
| ABC | June | The Dating Game | The Newlywed Game | The Lawrence Welk Show (28/20.5) (Tied with The Mod Squad) | | **The Johnny Cash Show** | | Local |
| CBS | | The Jackie Gleason Show (24/20.8) (Tied with The Carol Burnett Show) | | My Three Sons (14/22.8) | Hogan's Heroes | Petticoat Junction | Mannix | |
| NBC | | **Adam-12** | Get Smart | **The Ghost & Mrs. Muir** | NBC Saturday Night at the Movies | | | |

== By network ==
=== ABC ===
**Returning Series**

- The ABC Sunday Night Movie
- The ABC Wednesday Night Movie
- The Avengers
- Bewitched
- The Big Valley
- The Dating Game
- The F.B.I.
- Felony Squad
- The Flying Nun
- The Guns of Will Sonnett
- Happening '69
- The Hollywood Palace
- It Takes a Thief
- Judd, for the Defense
- The King Family Show
- The Lawrence Welk Show
- Let's Make a Deal
- The Newlywed Game
- N.Y.P.D.
- Operation: Entertainment
- Peyton Place
- Saga of Western Man
- That Girl

**New Series**

- **Animal World** *
- **The Dick Cavett Show** *
- **The Don Rickles Show**
- **The Generation Gap** *
- **Here Come the Brides**
- **The Johnny Cash Show** *
- **Journey to the Unknown**
- **Land of the Giants**
- **The Mod Squad**
- **The Outcasts**
- **That's Life**
- **This is Tom Jones** *
- **The Ugliest Girl in Town**
- **What's It All About, World** *

Not returning from 1967–68:

- ABC Scope
- Batman
- Cowboy in Africa
- Custer
- Dream House
- Garrison's Gorillas
- Good Company
- Hondo
- The Invaders
- Iron Horse
- Man in a Suitcase
- Off to See the Wizard
- The Rat Patrol
- The Second Hundred Years
- Voyage to the Bottom of the Sea

=== CBS ===
**Returning Series**

- The 21st Century
- Animal World
- The Beverly Hillbillies
- The Carol Burnett Show
- CBS News Hour
- CBS Playhouse
- CBS Thursday Night Movie
- CBS Friday Night Movies
- Daktari
- The Ed Sullivan Show
- Family Affair
- Gentle Ben
- Gomer Pyle, U.S.M.C.
- Green Acres
- Gunsmoke
- Hogan's Heroes
- The Jackie Gleason Show
- The Jonathan Winters Show
- Lassie
- Mannix
- Mission: Impossible
- My Three Sons
- Petticoat Junction
- The Red Skelton Hour
- The Smothers Brothers Comedy Hour
- Turn-On
- The Wild Wild West

**New Series**

- **60 Minutes**
- **Blondie**
- **Carol Burnett Presents the Jimmie Rodgers Show** *
- **The Doris Day Show**
- **The Glen Campbell Goodtime Hour** *
- **The Good Guys**
- **Hawaii Five-O**
- **Hee Haw** *
- **Here's Lucy**
- **Lancer**
- **The Liberace Show** *
- **Mayberry R.F.D.**
- **The Queen & I** *

Not returning from 1967–68:

- The Andy Griffith Show
- Cimarron Strip
- Dundee and the Culhane
- Good Morning, World
- He & She
- Lost in Space
- The Lucy Show
- Premiere
- The Prisoner

=== NBC ===
**Returning Series**

- Bonanza
- Daniel Boone
- Dean Martin Presents the Golddiggers
- The Dean Martin Show
- Dragnet 1969
- Get Smart
- The High Chaparral
- I Dream of Jeannie
- Ironside
- The Jerry Lewis Show
- Kraft Music Hall
- The Mothers-in-Law
- Mutual of Omaha's Wild Kingdom
- NBC Monday Night at the Movies
- NBC Saturday Night at the Movies
- Rowan & Martin's Laugh-In
- The Saint
- Star Trek
- The Virginian
- Walt Disney's Wonderful World of Color

**New Series**

- **Adam-12**
- **The Beautiful Phyllis Diller Show**
- **Columbo**
- **The Ghost & Mrs. Muir**
- **Julia**
- **My Friend Tony** *
- **The Name of the Game**
- **The New Adventures of Huckleberry Finn**
- **The Outsider**

Not returning from 1967–68:

- Accidental Family
- Actuality Specials
- American Profile
- The Bell Telephone Hour
- The Champions
- The Danny Thomas Hour
- Hollywood Squares
- I Spy
- The Man from U.N.C.L.E.
- Maya
- The Monkees
- NBC News Reports
- Run for Your Life
- Tarzan

Note: The * indicates that the program was introduced in midseason.
