= This Is Tom Jones =

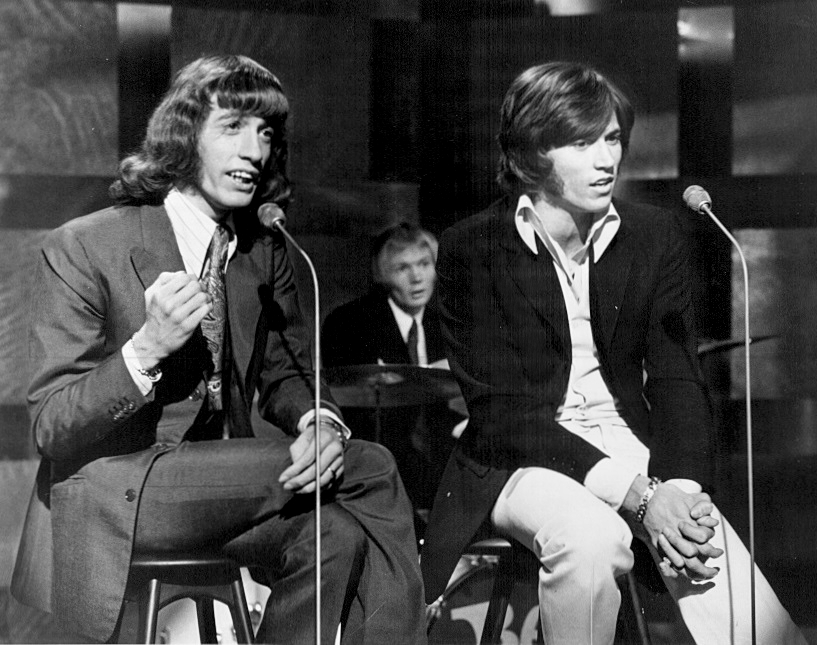
- The Bee Gees performing on This Is Tom Jones
- Genre: Variety
- Directed by: Jon Scoffield
- Presented by: Tom Jones
- Country of origin: United Kingdom
- Original language: English
- No. of series: 3
- No. of episodes: 65

Production
- Running time: 60 minutes
- Production companies: Associated Television; Incorporated Television Company

Original release
- Network: ITV (UK), ABC (USA)
- Release: 7 February 1969 – 15 January 1971

Related
- Tom Jones; Tom Jones: The Right Time

This Is Tom Jones is a British Associated Television variety series presented by Tom Jones. It was exported to the United States by ITC Entertainment and networked there by the American Broadcasting Company. The series ran between 1969 and 1971 to total 65 colour episodes. Jones was nominated for a Golden Globe Award for "Best Actor in a Television Series - Musical or Comedy" in 1969. The series also featured comedy sketches by the Ace Trucking Company improvisational group, featuring Fred Willard and Patti Deutsch, among others.

== Guest appearances ==
The show featured guest appearances by many top actors, comedians and singers of the time, including The Who, Nancy Sinatra, Shirley Bassey, Mary Hopkin, Peter Sellers, Liza Minnelli, Janis Joplin, Cher, Dusty Springfield, Sérgio Mendes, Ella Fitzgerald, Stevie Wonder, The 5th Dimension, Bob Hope, and Herman's Hermits.

== Episode guide ==
=== 1st Series ===
- #1 - Peter Sellers, Joey Heatherton, Richard Pryor, Mary Hopkin, The Moody Blues - aired: 7 February 1969
- #2 - Nancy Wilson, Mireille Mathieu, Davy Jones, Herman's Hermits, Rich Little - aired: 14 February 1969
- #3 - Lynn Redgrave, Sergio Mendes and Brasil '66, Lulu, Tim Conway, The Bee Gees - aired: 21 February 1969
- #4 - Dick Cavett, Terry-Thomas, The 5th Dimension, Sandie Shaw, Julie Driscoll w/Brian Auger and the Trinity - aired: 28 February 1969
- #5 - Shirley Jones, Dick Cavett, Dusty Springfield, Engelbert Humperdinck, The Foundations - aired: 7 March 1969
- #6 - Paul Anka, Mary Hopkin, Georgia Brown, The Crazy World of Arthur Brown, George Carlin - aired: 14 March 1969
- #7 - Cass Elliot, The Dave Clark Five, Massiel, George Carlin - aired: 21 March 1969
- #8 - Chet Atkins, Barbara Eden, Rich Little, Jerry Lee Lewis, Salena Jones - aired: 28 March 1969
- #9 - Judy Carne, Jo Anne Worley, Millicent Martin, Anita Harris - aired: 4 April 1969
- #10 - Donovan, Lainie Kazan, Bobby Goldsboro, Jo Anne Worley, Godfrey Cambridge - aired: 11 April 1969
- #11 - Manitas de Plata, Mireille Mathieu, Pat Paulsen, Fran Jeffries, The Who - aired: 18 April 1969
- #12 - Pat Paulsen, Stevie Wonder, Shani Wallis, The Hollies - aired: 25 April 1969
- #13 - Sonny & Cher, Herman's Hermits, Esther Ofarim, Cleo Laine, Henry Gibson - aired: 2 May 1969
- #14 - George Burns, John Davidson, Sally Ann Howes - aired: 22 May 1969
- #15 - The 5th Dimension, Dick Cavett, Juliet Prowse, Mireille Mathieu - aired: 29 May 1969

=== 2nd Series ===
- #16 - Sammy Davis Jr., Jo Anne Worley - aired: 25 September 1969
- #17 - Diahann Carroll, Bobby Darin, Blood, Sweat & Tears, David Steinberg - aired: 2 October 1969
- #18 - Tony Bennett, Vikki Carr, The Ace Trucking Company - aired: 9 October 1969
- #19 - Anthony Newley, Peggy Lipton, Crosby, Stills, Nash and Young, John Byner - aired: 16 October 1969
- #20 - Jose Feliciano, Shelley Berman, Mary Hopkin - aired: 23 October 1969
- #21 - Barbara Eden, Wilson Pickett, Hendra & Ullett - aired: 30 October 1969
- #22 - Connie Stevens, Matt Monro, The Moody Blues, Shecky Greene - aired: 6 November 1969
- #23 - Dick Cavett, Charles Aznavour, Cass Elliot, The Hollies - aired: 13 November 1969
- #24 - Johnny Cash, June Carter, Minnie Pearl, Jeannie C. Riley - aired: 20 November 1969
- #25 - Claudine Longet, Little Richard, The Ace Trucking Company - aired: 27 November 1969
- #26 - Glen Campbell, Janis Joplin, The Committee - aired: 4 December 1969
- #27 - Joel Grey, Sandi Shaw, The Ace Trucking Company - aired: 11 December 1969
- #28 - Liza Minnelli, Frankie Vaughan, Pat Cooper - aired: 18 December 1969
- #29 - Judy Collins, David Frye, Millicent Martin, The Welsh Treorchy Male Choir - aired: 25 December 1969
- #30 - Victor Borge, Harry Secombe, Paula Kelly - aired: 1 January 1970
- #31 - George Gobel, Shani Wallis, Raphael, The Rascals - aired: 15 January 1970
- #32 - Dusty Springfield, Don Ho, Lonnie Donegan, The Ace Trucking Company - aired: 22 January 1970
- #33 - Paul Anka, Joni Mitchell, George Kirby - aired: 29 January 1970
- #34 - Oliver, Nancy Wilson, Phil Harris - aired: 5 February 1970
- #35 - Robert Goulet, Kenny Rogers and the First Edition, Lulu, The Ace Trucking Company - aired: 12 February 1970
- #36 - Leslie Uggams, Joe Cocker & The Grease Band, Guy Marks - aired: 19 February 1970
- #37 - Smokey Robinson & The Miracles, Barbara McNair, Dick Shawn - aired: 26 February 1970
- #38 - Bob Hope, Billy Eckstine, Bobbie Gentry - aired: 5 March 1970
- #39 - Raquel Welch, Lou Rawls, Roy Clark, The Ace Trucking Company - aired: 19 March 1970
- #40 - Ray Charles, Jane Powell, Robert Klein - aired: 26 March 1970
- #41 - Sammy Davis Jr., Band of the Welsh Guards - aired: 2 April 1970

=== 3rd Series ===
- #42 - Anne Bancroft, Burt Bacharach, The Ace Trucking Company - aired: 25 September 1970
- #43 - Zero Mostel, Diahann Carroll, The Ace Trucking Company - aired: 2 October 1970
- #44 - Bob Hope, Aretha Franklin, The Ace Trucking Company - aired: 9 October 1970
- #45 - Steve Lawrence and Eydie Gorme, José Ferrer, The Ace Trucking Company - aired: 16 October 1970
- #46 - Liza Minnelli, Edward G. Robinson, The Ace Trucking Company - aired: 23 October 1970
- #47 - Glen Campbell, Nancy Sinatra, Jerry Reed, Big Jim Sullivan, The Ace Trucking Company - aired: 30 October 1970
- #48 - Perry Como, Debbie Reynolds, The Unusual We, Patti Deutsch, The Ace Trucking Company - aired: 6 November 1970
- #49 - The Supremes, Scoey Mitchell, Ray Stevens, The Ace Trucking Company - aired: 13 November 1970
- #50 - Jack Jones, Joey Heatherton, Jerry Reed, Big Jim Sullivan - aired: 20 November 1970
- #51 - Florence Henderson, Harry Secombe, The Ace Trucking Company, Big Jim Sullivan - aired: 27 November 1970
- #52 - Nancy Wilson, Buddy Greco, The Ace Trucking Company, Big Jim Sullivan - aired: 4 December 1970
- #53 - George Kirby, Caterina Valente, The Royal Highland Fusiliers, The Ace Trucking Company, Big Jim Sullivan - aired: 11 December 1970
- #54 - Ella Fitzgerald, Rudolf Nureyev, Merle Park, The Welsh Treorchy Male Choir, The Ace Trucking Company, Big Jim Sullivan - aired: 25 December 1970
- #55 - Shirley Bassey, John Denver, The Ace Trucking Company, Big Jim Sullivan - aired: 1 January 1971
- #56 - Phyllis Diller, Lulu, Frankie Vaughan, The Ace Trucking Company, Big Jim Sullivan - aired: 8 January 1971
- #57 - Petula Clark, The Ace Trucking Company, Big Jim Sullivan - aired: 15 January 1971

== Rights dispute ==
In recent years, distribution rights to the show have been the subject of litigation, in relation to the original licence holder, C/F International. For example, as of December 2004, C/F International was a secured judgement creditor of Classic World Productions and it principal, Darryl Payne, for approximately one million dollars, and was the principal secured creditor at the time of the Chapter 11 bankruptcy filing by the company, six months later. C/F International's action against Classic World Productions and owner Darryl Payne was based on unpaid royalties in relation to This Is Tom Jones, and related recordings. The 1969-1971 This Is Tom Jones television shows are currently sold by Time-Life, rather than by Classic World Productions or C/F International.

== Home releases ==
A triple-DVD compilation of performances from the show, subtitled Rock 'n' Roll Legends, was released by Time Life Entertainment (under licence from Paul Brownstein Productions) on 26 June 2007, having previously been issued, in various forms, by Classic World Productions. It features performances from Richard Pryor, Mary Hopkin, Peter Sellers, The Who, Burt Bacharach, Anne Bancroft, Glen Campbell, Janis Joplin, Joe Cocker, Big Jim Sullivan, Little Richard, Stevie Wonder, Bob Hope and Aretha Franklin. Crosby, Stills, Nash & Young were featured in early promotional copies, but these were withdrawn when rights issues prevented their performance being released; Little Richard was substituted for the final copies.

Another triple-DVD compilation of performances from the show, subtitled Legendary Performers, was released by Time Life on 12 February 2008. It features performances from Sammy Davis, Jr., Tony Bennett, Bobby Darin, David Steinberg, Liza Minnelli, Rich Little, Jerry Lee Lewis, Chet Atkins, Johnny Cash and June Carter.
