= Classic World Productions =

Classic World Productions was a significant issuer of back music catalogues and television programs. It was based in Naperville, Illinois.

== History ==
Classic World Productions is owned by Darryl Payne. It filed for Chapter 11 bankruptcy proceedings on July 30, 2005. In its Chapter 11 filing, the company was described as follows: "The Debtor is one of the most respected and resourceful entertainment companies for back catalogue music. The catalog features a diverse range of legendary artists, spanning all genres, including: Judy Garland, The Chi-Lites, Little Richard, Jose Feliciano, Kenny Rogers, and a host of others. The Debtor also carries an impressive collection of vintage television programs." Other releases included albums by Sly and The Family Stone, Carol Douglas, Tommy Roe and The Electric Flag.

=== Dispute over royalties: The Tom Jones Show ===
At the time of its Chapter 11 filing, the principal creditor of Classic World Productions was C/F International, a licensor of television programs, among other media. As of December 2004, C/F International was a secured judgement creditor of Classic World Productions and Darryl Payne for approximately one million dollars, and was the principal secured creditor at the time of the bankruptcy filing. C/F International's action against Classic World Productions and owner Darryl Payne was based on unpaid royalties in relation to the Tom Jones television show from 1980 to 1981, "The Tom Jones Show", and related recordings. C/F International's rights to later Tom Jones material were subject to dispute. In March, 2007, Tom Jones and Tom Jones Enterprises sued C/F International to stop C/F International from licensing sound recordings made from Jones' 1981 series of variety shows, "The Tom Jones Show", recorded in Vancouver, Canada. It was contended that any rights that C/F International had to license "The Tom Jones Show" did not include the right to make and license separate recordings of the performances on the show. In addition, it was contended that any rights that C/F International had in "The Tom Jones Show" no longer existed, due to numerous breaches of contract. Examples of contentious CDs include Live on The Tom Jones Show (released 2006) and Greatest Hits Live (originally issued by C/F International in 1981; later license to and CD issue by Prism Leisure Corporation as 30 Greatest Hits - Live in Concert). The 1969-1971 "This Is Tom Jones" television shows are currently offered by Time-Life, rather than by Classic World Productions or C/F International;

Six months after the amount owed by Classic World Productions to C/F International had been judicially determined, Classic World Productions filed for Chapter 11 bankruptcy proceedings. The assets of Classic World Productions were seized by C/F International, based on the latter's secured judgement creditor status. However, C/F International Judgement against Darryl Payne was dismissed. Tom Jones Enterprises secured a judgement against C/F International for US$9 Million. The facts of this case showed C/F International had no such rights to The Tom Jones Show.

Ownership interest in the Classic World Productions Inc, catalog was granted and is owned by music producer Darryl Payne. Darryl Payne received these ownership rights by 2 Federal Bankruptcy Court Orders.

=== Ownership interest in The Judy Garland Show ===
Prior to its Chapter 11 filing, Classic World Productions had co-released, with Pioneer Entertainment and to great acclaim, various DVDs of the short-lived The Judy Garland Show. Darryl Payne, owner of Classic World Productions, had acquired the U.S. rights to these shows for a net payment of $900,000 in 1998 to Sid Luft, Judy Garland's former husband. These co-releases continued, with Pioneer successor corporation Geneon Entertainment, through 2006. Geneon Entertainment was primarily known for Japanese anime productions. The U.S. operations of Geneon Entertainment were closed in December 2007, with the Japanese parent selling the balance of its interest in Geneon worldwide to Universal Pictures International in late 2008. Darryl Payne currently asserts copyright ownership to all 26 episodes of The Judy Garland Show.
