= Blondie (1968 TV series) =

American television sitcom

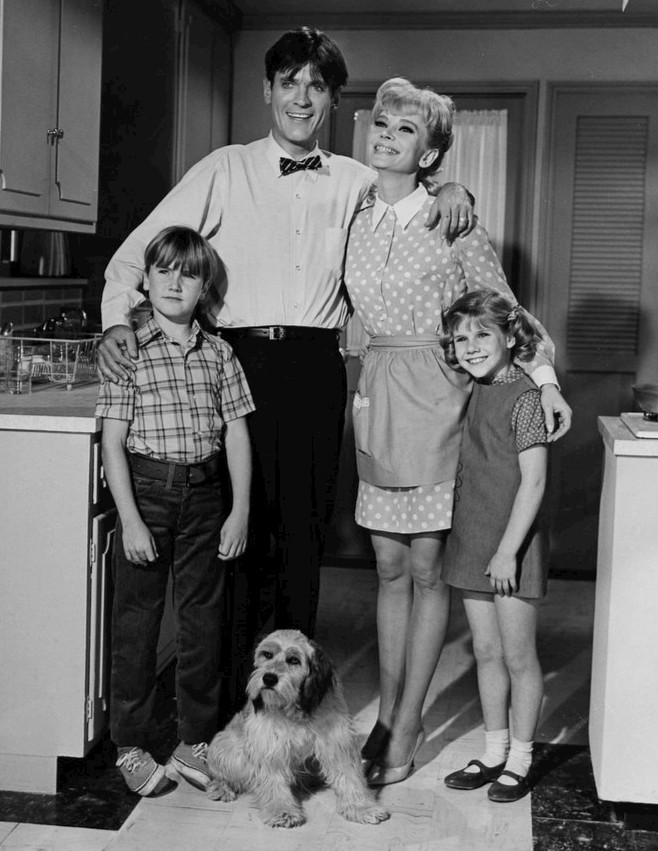
- The Bumstead family.
- Also known as: The New Blondie
- Genre: Sitcom
- Based on: comic strip Blondie by Chic Young
- Written by: Danny Simon
- Directed by: Norman Abbott; Peter Baldwin; Bruce Bilson; Gene Nelson
- Starring: Patricia Harty; Will Hutchins; Peter Robbins; Pamelyn Ferdin; Jim Backus
- Country of origin: United States
- Original language: English
- No. of seasons: 1
- No. of episodes: 14 (1 unaired)

Production
- Executive producer: Al Brodax
- Producer: Joe Connelly
- Running time: 24 mins.
- Production companies: Kayro Productions; King Features Syndicate

Original release
- Network: CBS
- Release: September 26, 1968 – January 9, 1969

Related
- Blondie (1957 TV series); Blondie (comic strip)

Blondie (also known as The New Blondie) is an American sitcom that aired on CBS during the 1968–69 television season. The series is an updated version of the 1957 TV series based on the comic strip of the same name. The series stars Patricia Harty as the title character and Will Hutchins as her husband, Dagwood Bumstead. Jim Backus played Dagwood's boss Mr. Dithers, with his real-life wife, Henny Backus, playing Cora Dithers. The series also featured Peter Robbins as the Bumsteads' son, Alexander, Pamelyn Ferdin as their daughter, Cookie, and character actor Bryan O'Byrne as the hapless mailman, always getting run over by Dagwood hurrying out the door, late for work.

== Synopsis ==
Blondie stars Patricia Harty and Will Hutchins as Blondie and Dagwood Bumstead, a suburban couple raising two precocious children. Plots mixed typical sitcom tropes from home life and work life. The series is best remembered for its opening theme, which featured the comic strip characters in animated form before transforming into the actors playing the characters.

Like the 1957 version, which lasted only one season, the series was not a hit, lasting a total of 13 weeks before being canceled, with the final episode remaining unaired. Two further episodes were planned, "The Dying Swan" and "Dagwood's Private War", but were never completed.

== Cast ==
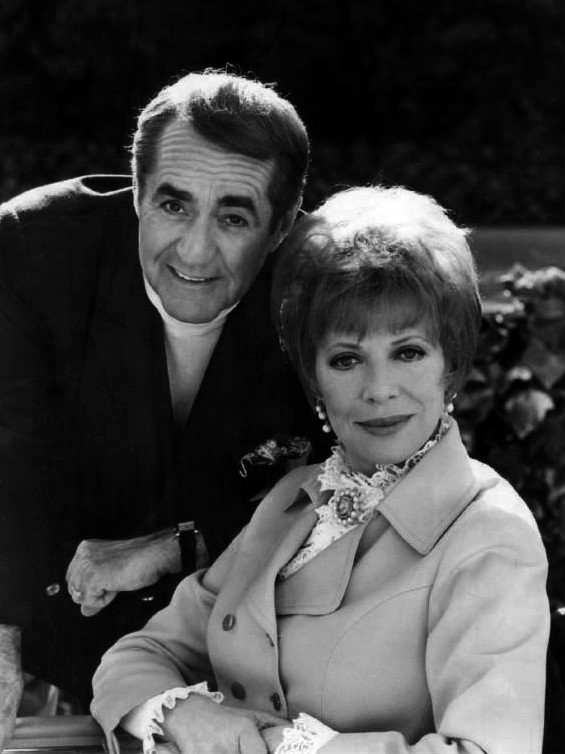
Jim and Henny Backus as Mr. and Mrs. Dithers

- Patricia Harty as Blondie
- Will Hutchins as Dagwood Bumstead
- Jim Backus as Mr. Dithers
- Pamelyn Ferdin as Cookie
- Peter Robbins as Alexander
- Henny Backus as Mrs. Cora Dithers
- Bobbi Jordan as Tootsie Woodley
- Bryan O'Byrne as the mailman Mr. Beasley

Ferdin and Robbins would later reunite on the 1969 television special It Was a Short Summer, Charlie Brown and the 1969 film A Boy Named Charlie Brown, being the last time Robbins played Charlie Brown.

== Production notes ==
This version of the series, jointly produced by CBS Productions (which owns the distribution rights in the United States), King Features Syndicate and Kayro Productions, ran from September 26, 1968, to January 9, 1969.

Cast member Pamelyn Ferdin recalls the series was cancelled so abruptly that the cast was dismissed during the lunch break while an episode was being filmed.

== Episodes ==
No.	Title	Directed by	Written by	Original release date	Prod. code
1	"Sayanora Dagwood"	Norman Abbott	Gary Belkin and George Tibbles	September 26, 1968	1
2	"My Camp Runneth Over"	Peter Baldwin	Gary Belkin & John McGreevey	October 3, 1968	8
3	"Blondie-Flower Child"	Norman Abbott	Unknown	October 10, 1968	4
4	"The Gladiators"	Gene Nelson	Danny Simon	October 17, 1968	9
5	"Angel in Disguise"	Bruce Bilson	Unknown	October 31, 1968	10
6	"Dither's Damned Dog"	Norman Abbott	Unknown	November 7, 1968	2
7	"Dagwood the Wheeler Dealer"	Norman Abbott	Unknown	November 14, 1968	6
8	"Blondie's Good Citizen"	Norman Abbott	Unknown	November 21, 1968	3
9	"Blondie's Birthday"	Gene Nelson	Unknown	December 5, 1968	13
10	"Marriage Menders"	Norman Abbott	Lois Hire	December 12, 1968	5
11	"Blondie's Masquerade"	Gene Nelson	Unknown	December 19, 1968	11
12	"Once Upon a Guru"	Norman Abbott	Unknown	December 26, 1968	7
13	"Pick on a Bully Your Own Size"	Peter Baldwin	Unknown	January 9, 1969	14
14	"Run Bunny Run"	Gene Nelson	Bob Mosher	Unaired	12
