= Animal World (TV series) =

- Genre: Nature; Documentary
- Narrated by: Bill Burrud
- Country of origin: United States
- Original language: English
- No. of episodes: (list of episodes)

Original release
- Network: NBC
- Release: 16 June 1968

Animal World is an American television wildlife documentary series hosted by Bill Burrud and airing between 1968 and 1971. Originally airing on NBC as a summer replacement, it moved to CBS, then ABC before going into syndication. Debuting on 16 June 1968, under the name Animal Kingdom, it was renamed Animal World beginning with the 11 August 1968 broadcast.
