= List of The Rat Patrol episodes =

This is a list of The Rat Patrol episodes from MGM.

== Series overview ==
Season	Episodes	Originally released	
Season	Episodes	First released	Last released
1	32	September 12, 1966	May 1, 1967
2	26	September 11, 1967	March 18, 1968

== Episodes ==
=== Season 1 (1966–67) ===
No. overall	No. in season	Title	Directed by	Written by	Original release date
1	1	"The Chase of Fire Raid"	Tom Gries	Tom Gries & Lorenzo Semple, Jr.	September 12, 1966
Pilot episode. The Rat Patrol reluctantly gains a new member in British sergeant Jack Moffitt and races to find and destroy a buried fuel supply before their nemesis, Captain Hans Dietrich, can claim it for Germany.
2	2	"The Life Against Death Raid"	Lee H. Katzin	Anthony Lawrence	September 19, 1966
Hitchcock is seriously wounded during an otherwise routine raid on a German convoy. Stuck more than 100 miles behind enemy lines and with Hitch fading fast, Troy has no choice but to risk sneaking him into a nearby German field hospital while dressed as nurses, for the necessary life-saving treatment. Ed Asner guest stars.
3	3	"The Wildest Raid of All"	John Peyser	Al Ramrus & John Shaner	September 26, 1966
Troy and Hitchcock allow themselves to be captured by Dietrich in order to kidnap his superior, a highly-decorated German general. The plan: use him as a bargaining chip to gain access to a German ammunition depot and destroy supplies slated for use in a massive Wehrmacht offensive set for the following day. Guest stars: Wolfgang Preiss as General Ernest von Helmreich; Max Slaten as Colonel Shtengler; Rick Hutton as Dr. Muller; Manfred Lating as Nervous Soldier
4	4	"The Kill or Be Killed Raid"	Lee H. Katzin	Harry Kronman	October 3, 1966
Posing as a German archaeologist, Moffitt infiltrates enemy headquarters to translate and destroy an ancient Coptic scroll which details the location of a coveted source of water deep in the desert. But when his cover is blown and he is captured with little chance of rescue, Troy is faced with carrying out a difficult order to kill him before he falls into the brutal hands of the Gestapo. Guest stars: Milton Selzer as Col. Martin Schweiger; Susan Dierderich as Arab Girl (Uncredited)
5	5	"The Chain of Death Raid"	John Peyser	Jay Simms	October 10, 1966
The aftermath of a raid on a German column headed for a vital oasis results in both Troy and Dietrich being captured by Arab slave-traders. Joined at the wrist by a length of heavy chain, they soon escape, only to find themselves lost in the desert and miles from help. Without food, water or shelter, the two bitter enemies have no choice but to rely on each other or face certain death under a blazing sun.
6	6	"The Do or Die Raid"	John Peyser	Story by : Alan Caillou; Teleplay by : Anthony Lawrence	October 17, 1966
A covert operation to plant false intelligence data in enemy headquarters is severely jeopardized when the special operative the Rat Patrol is escorting has a heart attack at a critical stage in the mission. With time running out and failure not an option, Troy must somehow ensure the success of the mission and still manage to get away before the Germans even know they were there, lest the deception be discovered.
7	7	"The Blind Man's Bluff Raid"	Lee H. Katzin	Larry Cohen	October 24, 1966
A surprise ambush near a minefield separates Troy from the rest of his unit. After passing-out in the desert, he awakens to find himself in an Allied field hospital, stricken with sun blindness. But things are not as they seem. Unbeknownst to Troy, he has been captured by the Germans and the field hospital, as well as his blindness, are an elaborate scheme by Dietrich to trick him into revealing where the rest of the Rat Patrol are hiding. James Philbrook guest starred in this episode as Dr. Keller.
8	8	"The Fatal Chase Raid"	John Peyser	Story by : Edmund Morris; Teleplay by : Arthur Dales	October 31, 1966
After freeing two truckloads of POWs from a German convoy, the Rat Patrol is forced to transport the obnoxious, self-serving Sgt. Archie Gribs (Gavin MacLeod) back to headquarters. He claims to have information vital to Allied forces, but only seems interested in saving his own neck. With Gribs' selfish attitude already grating on everyone's nerves, the situation is made worse by the loss of one of their jeeps and the presence of two bitter GIs who blame Gribs for their capture. ("Arthur Dales" is a pseudonym for writer Howard Dimsdale.)
9	9	"The Blow Sky High Raid"	John Peyser	Richard Landau	November 7, 1966
The Rat Patrol transports an extremely volatile new explosive on a mission to destroy a vital German radar installation. At stake is an approaching flight of Allied bombers set to destroy Rommel's newest armoured division. With the lieutenant (Hamilton Camp) trained in the explosive's use killed, the enemy alerted to their presence, and time running out, the Patrol is forced to take a secret route through the mountains along the course of an ancient riverbed. Unfortunately for Troy, Dietrich has also learned of this secret route and lies in wait for them at their destination.
10	10	"The Moment of Truce Raid"	John Peyser	Richard Landau	November 14, 1966
The Rat Patrol, along with Dietrich and two of his men, become trapped in some desert ruins, held at bay by a sizable band of fanatical Arabs who are hell-bent on wiping them out as "infidels". Greatly outnumbered and with limited supplies of ammunition, the enemies find themselves forced into an uneasy truce for survival.
11	11	"The Deadly Double Raid"	Lee H. Katzin	Ronald Sossi	November 21, 1966
Moffitt and Pettigrew allow themselves to be captured in order to rescue an Allied spy with vital information about a surprise German offensive from a POW camp. Upon learning that the operative has died, all seems lost, when both the camp doctor and an American sergeant suddenly claim to have been passed the information. The problem is, one of them is really a Gestapo agent and the Rat Patrol must discover which one is telling the truth before it is too late.
12	12	"The Gun Runner Raid"	Lee H. Katzin	Daniel Aubrey	November 28, 1966
The Rat Patrol is captured by Arab mercenaries disguised as an American convoy. Their employer, a decorated US flyer turned arms dealer and traitor, has a grudge against them; apparently the Patrol destroyed several of his shipments, thinking they were German. Rather than kill them, he makes Troy and Moffitt an offer they cannot refuse: join him in his less-than-honorable racket or he turns them over to his biggest client, Hauptmann Dietrich.
13	13	"The Lighthouse Raid"	John Peyser	Daniel Aubrey	December 5, 1966
Tully and Moffitt transport a liberated French underground general to a rendezvous in a deserted lighthouse. Hitchcock stands lookout, disguised as a German guard. Troy, though, is held captive inside the lighthouse—betrayed by Mathias, the lighthouse keeper. Moffitt tries to reach him but ends up unconscious. In the ensuing fight, Mathias is killed and Troy manages to signal the trawler into the area to take the general to safety.
14	14	"The Dare-Devil Rescue Raid"	John Peyser	Michael A. Hoey	December 12, 1966
German artillery traps 2000 Allied soldiers and their only chance of rescue is an Allied armored attack. The necessary equipment, though, can only reach them in time via an ancient road which is now hidden by sand, a road only Moffitt's father can find. On the way to the landing site, Moffitt's father's plane crashes. Moffitt wants to go find him but Troy insists their first priority is to find the road themselves. Moffitt breaks away and goes to find his father but finds only the burned-out plane. Troy thinks the elder Moffitt must be dead. Moffitt says he was captured. Again Moffitt escapes the team and goes after his father—finally rescuing him.
15	15	"The Last Harbor Raid: Episode I"	John Peyser	Story by : John Peyser & Richard Landau; Teleplay by : Richard Landau	December 19, 1966
After each Allied bombing of their harbor, the Germans use Allied POWs to rebuild it. HQ sends the Rat Patrol to liberate the POWs and halt the harbor's usefulness. Troy must coordinate his plans with Major Indrus (John Anderson), an American who is inside the camp. They use an explosive-laden boat to get into the harbour but the Germans stop it in halfway. The captain, Bertaine (Will Kuluva), does not allow the Germans to board his boat. Troy and his men are able to fight off the boarding party and escape into town, but at the cost of Bertaine's life. They are followed by El Gamil (Stanley Adams), a sympathetic Arab merchant and black marketeer, who provides a car and uniforms for Moffitt and Hitchcock to go to the German Officer's Club in search of Bertaine's daughter Marianne (Claudine Longet). She is regarded as a traitor by locals because she performs at the club, but Troy has no choice but to seek out her help. The episode ends with Moffitt and Hitchcock entering the club.
16	16	"The Last Harbor Raid: Episode II"	John Peyser	Story by : John Peyser & Richard Landau; Teleplay by : Richard Landau	December 26, 1966
Moffitt and Hitch (dressed as Germans) find Bertaine's daughter and tell her of her father's death. Then they take her home - after they tell her who they really are. They also tell her that they need to use the fishing fleet to accomplish their mission. Meanwhile, Troy secretly meets with American POW liaison officer Indrus. Troy then joins Moffitt at the house of El Gamil. Informed of the plan, El Gamil dispatches his men to the various harbor areas to alert the fishermen. Troy sets the action to begin at dawn.
17	17	"The Last Harbor Raid: Episode III"	John Peyser	Story by : John Peyser & Richard Landau; Teleplay by : Richard Landau	January 2, 1967
The plan is for the fishing fleet to bring out the prisoners, Dunkirk-fashion. However, a Nazi patrol boat has intercepted the boats. The fishermen believe that Marinanne is a collaborator. Sgt. Troy, though, disagrees and he is right. Marianne talks the fishermen into cooperating, and the prisoners make good their escape.
18	18	"The One That Got Away Raid"	Robert Sparr	Ellis Kadison	January 9, 1967
Lieutenant Gustav Luden (Jack Colvin), a radio operator, wants to defect, so he sends secret information to the Americans on a frequency that the Rat Patrol listens to. The Patrol goes in after him. They get inside the German base and, once there, find that Luden is being questioned by the Gestapo. Guest stars: Alan Bergman as Colonel Krieg; Jack Colvin as Lieutenant Gustav Luden; Charles Maxwell as Colonel Prochek; Walter Friedel as Lieutenant Durst; Walter Alzmann as Corporal Coppel; Chris Anders as Stumpf; Manfred Lating as Müller
19	19	"Two for One Raid"	Jess Hibbs	Anthony Lawrence	January 16, 1967
Valuable German ammo has been dropped by parachute to an Arab farmhouse, and the Rat Patrol is sent to destroy it. On destroying the building, Troy discovers that there is no ammo—but there is a confused teenage boy. The boy proves out to be the son of a German commander. Troy is going to kill the commander, but when the boy pleads with him not to, Troy remembers what it felt like to lose his own father, who died when Troy was this boy's age. Troy arranges to capture the German instead of killing him.
20	20	"The Last Chance Raid"	Lee H. Katzin	Sheldon Stark	January 23, 1967
The Patrol's radio is wrecked and Troy is unable to warn HQ of a large Nazi anti-tank outfit waiting in ambush. Troy knows that El Jebel has a huge radio broadcast unit and heads there. Troy, Moffitt and the others make their way into the radio room and prepare to broadcast their warning to the British. However, Captain Deitrich walks in on them and takes them prisoner. Troy and Moffitt manage to escape. They free Hitch and Pettigrew and get their message back to London. This prevents the Allies from losing a lot of tanks.
21	21	"The B Negative Raid"	Herschel Daugherty	Don C. Richman	January 30, 1967
Moffitt is seriously wounded in a raid on a German convoy. The Patrol is far from help and so Troy decides to obtain blood from a nearby German field camp. Dietrich is in charge of the base; Troy encounters him and orders him to help him find a donor. Dietrich sends for Corporal Pennell (guest appearance by teen idol Fabian Forte), a captured Yank deserter. Pennell refuses to cooperate but Troy takes him at gunpoint. On the way back to Moffitt, Dietrich catches up to them and it is up to Pennell to do the "impossible" to prevent them from all being recaptured. He rises to the occasion and they make it back to Moffitt and Tully in time to save Moffitt's life.
22	22	"The Exhibit A Raid"	Lawrence Dobkin	Richard De Roy	February 6, 1967
Troy and Hitchcock capture Col Beckmann, an infamous Nazi POW camp commander. Beckmann denies that he is the man. In a fight Troy is knocked out and Hitch is wounded. Using Troy's gun, Beckmann kills the other German taken at the same time he was and then he exchanges dog tags with him—then places the gun in Troy's hand. Troy is thus accused of the murder. Moffitt and Tully do not arrive until after the deed is done. To prove to a court-martial board that Beckmann is Beckmann, the other Patrolers must break into a German HQ—at considerable risk to their own lives. Robert Knapp appears in this episode as Captain Fisher.
23	23	"The Holy War Raid"	Hollingsworth Morse	Story by : Ronald Sossi; Teleplay by : Ronald Sossi & Philip Nemo	February 13, 1967
Using a fake (German) Rat Patrol -- a false-flag operation -- Dietrich abducts an Arab holy man that he will then "rescue" so that the Arabs will give their help to the Germans. The real Patrol is captured by the Arabs, though, and when they convince the Arab leader—who is a friend of Moffitt's—that they are not guilty, Troy and Moffitt go to find the holy man. To do so means a horse trip across the desert.
24	24	"The Two Against Time Raid"	Robert Sparr	Peter Allan Fields	February 20, 1967
Using a telephoto lens, Moffitt and Troy photograph a map inside Captain Dietrich's office from the roof of the adjoining Nazi HQ. It shows the location of a top secret German ammo dump. The Patrol must reach the site, enter it and destroy it before half of the German army arrives. The Patrol arrive to find the storage area—an old mine—surprisingly deserted. They go about planting the explosives but just before they blow it, Dietrich (who has laid this all out as a trap) turns up. Shots are exchanged and Dietrich and Troy are trapped inside. Meantime, outside the mine, assuming that in the cave-in Troy was killed, Moffitt and the Patrol prepare to finish blowing it up. Working together, Troy and Dietrich escape through a back entrance moments before the dump is blown up.
25	25	"The Wild Goose Raid"	Leon Benson	Harry Kronman	February 27, 1967
The Brits and the Americans are planning a high-level meeting in a desert town. On the day prior to the event, the Patrol sights a German motorcyclist and chases him—but he gets away. Assuming that the Nazis must now know of the conference, Troy tries to talk the commanders out of the meeting. But, instead, they assign him to be in charge of the security. Troy gets jumped, while in town, by a knife-wielding Arab. Sgt. Roberts, one of the other "security" men, rescues Troy. Unknown to them, though, Roberts is a double agent and is planning to blow up the meeting—a fact that Troy learns. Guest Star - Martin Milner as Sgt. Roberts
26	26	"The Bring 'Em Back Alive Raid"	Herschel Daugherty	Dan Ullman	March 13, 1967
Troy raids German HQ and kidnaps Dr. Erich Schneidermann. At the same time Moffitt, Tully and Hitch are captured by Captain Dietrich. Dietrich reveals that Troy is carrying a vial of deadly radium. He urges Moffitt to divulge Troy's destination, bargaining the Patrols' unconditional freedom for the return of Schneidermann. Moffitt, disbelieving the radium story, keeps quiet. However Troy is carrying the fatal vessel. The three Patrollers escape and trail Troy back to the rendezvous, with Dietrich trailing them.
27	27	"Take Me to Your Leader Raid"	Robert Sparr	Edward J. Lakso	March 20, 1967
The Patrol stumbles on a German staff car but before they can attack it, the driver and a guard are killed by a third man—who is apparently an American major. The major orders the Patrol to take him to where a high-level meeting is being held in secret. They do so, unaware that he is a German officer and that Dietrich is trailing them. However on the way they stumble on a unit of Italians who were badly injured and their officer—returning with the Patrol to get his men help—recognizes that the Major must be a German. Whereupon the German attempts to kill the Italian—arousing Troy's suspicion. Guest Star: Richard Mulligan as Major Lansing
28	28	"The Double or Nothing Raid"	Sutton Roley	Mark Weingart	March 27, 1967
Moffitt is about to be executed for "espionage against the Third Reich" when suddenly the Patrol comes to his rescue. A commandeered German truck unsuccessfully attempts to scoop up Moffitt, but manages to take a Nazi captain in his place—for exchange. Negotiations for a prisoner exchange are fruitful, but Troy doubts that the Germans will obey their own rules. Indeed, the Nazi's Colonel Voss wants to see the Patrol wiped out and uses the exchange as a trap. The captured captain tries to escape the Patrol and gets himself killed. Now Troy has no one to exchange for a seriously wounded Moffitt and must attempt to pass himself off as a German. Guest stars: Ben Wright as Col. Voss; Barry Ford as Capt. Rostov; Michael Vandever as Lt. Dorf
29	29	"The Hour Glass Raid"	Herschel Daugherty	Dean Hargrove	April 3, 1967
After capturing Dr. Anderson, a skilled Allied physician, Dietrich ends up turning over his staff car in a ravine (during a blinding sand storm). Troy wants to attempt to rescue the doctor but cannot because of the storm. He hears Dietrich's distress call but suspects it is a trick. In the end they do make the attempt as they hear that the Germans are going to do the same. They get Dr. Anderson—who is fine—but Dietrich is trapped under the car and badly injured. The doctor tells them that Dietrich is dead but the German groans just before the Patrol leaves. When Troy ends up saving Dietrich's life, the doctor was about to kill him with a murderous dose of morphine, Dietrich tells Troy that Anderson is a double agent. Anderson ends up getting killed just as the Germans arrive to help their captain.
30	30	"Mask-a-Raid"	Robert Sparr	Ellis Kadison	April 10, 1967
Lieutenant Klaus Klinger, a wounded Luftwaffe ace, is the only German who can ID the location of the Allied troops standing ready to invade Sicily. The Rat Patrol captures him and then Moffitt takes his place so that he can convince the Germans to watch in the wrong place for the upcoming attack. Troy, meanwhile, infiltrates the military hospital. Gestapo Major Heinrich Bruder however suspects Moffitt and exposes him, but by the time he does, Moffitt manages to get Bruder killed in his place and escape. Guest stars: William Jordan as Major Heinrich Bruder; Than Wyenn as Colonel von Graff; Rick Traeger as Major Kurt Gehlson; Ulla Strömstedt as Ilse Greuner; Mark Tapscott as Colonel Gage
31	31	"The Fire and Brimstone Raid"	Frank Baur	Stan Sherman	April 26, 1967
Troy and his men plant explosives in a German ammo depot and while trying for a hasty getaway run into Dietrich, who orders them to surrender. Knowing they are safe surrounded by explosives, Troy and Moffitt defuse the charges and wait for nightfall to escape. Not wanting to blow the depot sky high, Dietrich's men use bows and arrows and end up shooting Hitch in the shoulder. The two are quickly taken care of by Troy. Moffitt tries to make it to a truck using smoke grenades, but is captured by Dietrich. With the help of the Arab winery owner, the Rat Patrol finally dash to safety. When the American grenade fails to blow up the ammo depot, the winery owner does it for them.
32	32	"The Delilah Raid"	Jack N. Reddish	Anthony Lawrence	May 1, 1967
Season finale: A young French Resistance fighter—Michele—survives the Patrol's quick assault on a small German convoy. She explains that she was captured during her groups' attempt to stop the convoy which carries radar equipment. However Michele is a double agent and is going to deliver the Patrol to her lover—a German officer. She talks the Patrol into going to the radar base (supposedly to destroy it). She turns them over to him and, in the end, when the Patrol manages to escape—and blow up the radar base—he is killed.

=== Season 2 (1967–68) ===
No. overall	No. in season	Title	Directed by	Written by	Original release date
33	1	"The Truce at Aburah Raid"	Sutton Roley	Edward J. Lakso	September 11, 1967
Captain Dietrich monitors a broadcast sent to the Patrol from HQ and then intercepts them on their way to meet and escort a supply convoy. With the odds decidedly against the Rats, Troy takes refuge in an oasis. A child, playing nearby, runs away terrified of the noise and falls down an old well. The Allies and the Nazis agree to put the war on hold and work together to get the child (who is still alive) out. A second German unit appears and shoots Tully. In the end, they are able to rescue the child and, in the confusion, the Patrol escapes. Guest stars: Joe Turkel as Capt. Bruener; Anna Strasberg as Marisha; Margot Jane as Kiri
34	2	"The David and Goliath Raid"	Herschel Daugherty	Sheldon Stark	September 18, 1967
The Patrol ambushes a German courier and finds that his papers contain charts showing desert waterholes and some oases which are unknown to the Allies or the Germans. Suddenly a German patrol attacks, wounding Tully and destroying the Patrol's jeeps, water and weapons. Troy and crew strike out for a waterhole mentioned on the chart. Hours later, near their end, Troy and his men stagger toward an inviting waterhole to find it has been poisoned. On a distant dune they see Dietrich. Tully is near the end, because of his wound. It is up to Troy to negotiate with Dietrich. Guest stars: Manfred Lating as Medic; Mark Schell as Soldier
35	3	"The Trial by Fire Raid"	Sutton Roley	Peter Allan Fields	September 25, 1967
The Patrol attempts to destroy a small village that currently has a train in it that the Germans are loading with ammunition. However, there is a small group of Arabs (including women and children) being used to load the ammunition. One of the women stumbles upon Troy and offers to help by warning her people. But as Troy attempts to plant the explosives, Dietrich catches on to the plan and gives alarm. Troy ends up shot and captured. It is now up to the rest of the Patrol to cause enough diversion to get him free. The woman continues to plead with Dietrich to give Troy medical attention. As Dietrich is questioning Troy, though, Troy breaks free, shoots the German and is able—with the Arab woman's father's help—to get the explosives planted. The train goes up; the man is killed. Guest stars: Milton Selzer as Tobar; Gale Garnett as Safti; William Hoehne Jr. as German Corporal (uncredited)
36	4	"The Darers Go First Raid"	Paul Stanley	Mark Weingart	October 2, 1967
Troy determines that the Rat Patrol's only chance to destroy a supply depot inside an enemy-held fortress is by capturing a German tank and using it to get past the guards. Guest stars: Manfred Lating as German Tank Commander (uncredited); Norbert Meisel as German Tank Crewman (uncredited)
37	5	"The Love Thine Enemy Raid"	Herschel Daugherty	Edward J. Lakso	October 9, 1967
When the patrol ambush an Afrika Korps supply column, Troy accidentally wounds a German nurse. Feeling guilty, Troy decides to take her to a German field hospital. The only problem is that on the way she overhears a piece of vital information. Guest stars: Susanne Cramer as Gerta; Robert Champion as Lt. Bruener; Guy Danforth as Dr. Brahms; Hans Difflip as Capt. Krueger; Carl Crow as Sgt. Meade
38	6	"The Darkest Raid"	Leon Benson	Dean Hargrove	October 16, 1967
Troy infiltrates a German H.Q. posing as a blinded Afrika Korps officer to steal vital information. Guest stars: Alfred Ryder as Col. Rudolf Gerschon; Ken Drake as Lt. Klundt; Bard Stevens as Capt. Richter; Manfred Lating as Orderly
39	7	"The Death Do Us Part Raid"	Frank Baur	Anthony Lawrence	October 30, 1967
En route to a meeting with an Arab agent, the patrol is ambushed by Dietrich. With the exception of Troy, they're all captured and taken to Dietrich's desert base. Troy eventually meets up with the agent, who turns out to be a teenage boy, and a female Irish teacher, who is reluctant to allow the boy to help Troy. Guest stars: Pippa Scott as Drucilla Blacknar; Barry Robins as Ben Nafi; Stanley Waxman as Col. Luden
40	8	"The Do-Re-Mi Raid"	Robert Sparr	Don Brinkley	November 6, 1967
The Patrol is ordered to rescue pop star Mickey Roberts (singer Jack Jones), who is a POW in a small Afrika Korps compound, with the S.S. also turning up to make Roberts into a propaganda coup. Guest stars: Jack Jones as Mickey Roberts; Harvey Jason as Perkins; Rick Traeger as Commandant
41	9	"The Kingdom Come Raid"	Frank Baur	Robert Sherman	November 13, 1967
Hitchcock is supervising a transport convoy of new anti-aircraft shell fuses when the convoy is attacked by a German unit. Hitchcock is wounded by a deserter. Guest stars: Matt Clark as Corporal Meekin; Mark Tapscott as Major Burrows
42	10	"The Hide and Go Seek Raid"	Sutton Roley	Mark Weingart	November 20, 1967
The young mute son of British General Simms is kidnapped in a commando raid by Dietrich and taken to Rhodes. The patrol must rescue the boy from the island's garrison with only the help of one Greek resistance fighter. Guest stars: Mark Anthony as Miles Simms; Charles Irving as Col. von Graff; Nikita Knatz as German Guard; Morgan Jones as Capt. Boggs; Alan Caillou as Gen. Simms
43	11	"The Violent Truce Raid"	Eddie Davis	Don Brinkley	November 27, 1967
Lieutenant West is on his way to stop a medical supply convoy, when he's ambushed by an Afrika Korps patrol. Wounded and rescued by Moffatt and Pettigrew, before he dies he informs them that he's got to stop the medical supplies, as the blood plasma is poisonous. When Moffatt destroys the deadly supplies he is put under arrest by a British Army Major. Dietrichs' help is needed by Sgt. Troy to help clear Moffatt of court-martial charges by Dietrich confirming that the plasma was contaminated. Guest stars: Howard Caine as Major Bracken; Bruce Glover as Lt. West; Mike Freeman as Johnson
44	12	"The Life for a Life Raid"	Sutton Roley	Quentin Sparr & Don Brinkley	December 4, 1967
Dietrich traps the Rat Patrol in a cellar. In the cellar are a pregnant woman who has a valuable map, and a resistance fighter who has a personal vendetta with the woman. Guest stars: Kamala Devi as Sallah; Paul Stevens as Capt. Longet
45	13	"The Fifth Wheel Raid"	Robert Sparr	Richard De Roy	December 11, 1967
A British colonel is captured by the Germans after attending a staff meeting which centered on an upcoming Allied offensive. The Rat Patrol is ordered to either rescue or kill him before he can be interrogated. His Sikh aide insists on participating in the mission. Guest stars: Michael Tolan as Sgt. Kabir; Ben Wright as Col. Jamerson; Morgan Jones as Capt. Boggs; Mike Scanlon as Clerk
46	14	"The Two if by Sea Raid"	Robert Sparr	Mark Weingart	December 18, 1967
Moffitt gets into a German-held lighthouse by posing as an electrician, to try to gain information about a German naval convoy headed for North Africa which is carrying Tiger tanks. Guest stars: Walter Brooke as Capt. Vulcan; Michael Vandever as Lt. Reiner; Than Wyenn as Rouche; Norbert Meisel as Seaman Urban; Paul Verdier as Benet
47	15	"The Street Urchin Raid"	Leon Benson	Don Brinkley	December 25, 1967
Troy hides aerial photographs of secret German installations before being captured by the Gestapo. Then a street urchin finds and tries to sell the photos. Guest stars: Jean-Michel Michenaud as Tico; John Myhers as Rettig; Rika Dialyna as Sarina; Jon Shank as 1st Guard; Tanya Lemani as Belly Dancer
48	16	"The Pipeline to Disaster Raid"	Sutton Roley	Al Ramrus & John Shaner	January 1, 1968
A British general is rescued in the desert. He insists upon leading the Rat Patrol on a mission to disrupt a German oil pipeline, despite his deteriorated condition.: Guest Star: John Anderson as Gen. Owen Lansbury; Morgan Jones as Capt. Boggs
49	17	"The Boomerang Raid"	Robert Sparr	Edward J. Lakso	January 8, 1968
A lieutenant is infiltrated by submarine to set up naval gunfire coordinates, but Troy gets suspicious when the officer appears more interested in mapping the Allied positions than the German ones. Guest star: Dick Sargent as B. Kemper
50	18	"The Fatal Reunion Raid"	Herschel Daugherty	Don Brinkley	January 15, 1968
The Rat Patrol uses Moffitt's old flame, Gabrielle, (played by Louise Sorel), as a guide to rescue her husband, a French rocket scientist, from the Germans. Guest stars: Louise Sorel as Gabrielle; Gilbert Green as Colonel (General) Rettig; David Bond as Dr. Pierre Marchand; Mac McLaughlin as Andy
51	19	"The Decoy Raid"	Sutton Roley	Robert Sherman	January 22, 1968
A village's typhus serum is confiscated by the S.S. in order to exchange it for capturing the Rat Patrol. Dietrich questions their methods. Guest stars: Richard Davalos as Capt. Wansee; Jay Novello as LaDuc; Doreen McLean as Miss Arno; Socrates Ballis as Hassam
52	20	"The Touch-and-Go Raid"	Herschel Daugherty	Peter Allan Fields	February 5, 1968
Dietrich and his men capture the Rat Patrol and assume their identities, and thus are able to enter an Allied munitions dump. Guest stars: Robert Knapp as Major; Peter Church as Lt. Hartford; Carl Crow as 1st Sentry; Charles Bastin as Colonel Bauer; Tom Heaton as Operator; Mike Krempels as 2nd German; Robert Dornan as Sergeant; Nick Dimitri as U.S. Soldier (uncredited)
53	21	"The Field of Death Raid"	Herschel Daugherty	Richard K. Brockway	February 12, 1968
Troy's brother is captured by a German Major who was injured in an earlier raid by the Rat Patrol. (Richard Brockway was film editor on several episodes, including this one.); Guest stars: Albert Paulsen as Maj. von Brugge; Horst Ebersberg as Lt. Hardt; Jack Bannon as Lt. Koenig; Nick George as Group Capt. David Troy; Darwin Joston as Pvt. Peterson
54	22	"The Double Jeopardy Raid"	Frank Baur	Peter Allan Fields	February 19, 1968
A group of youthful partisans endanger the plans of an Allied offensive when they attack an SS camp. Danielle Roter is a guest. Guest stars: Clive Clerk as Jean-Claude; Diane Roter as Monique; Todd Martin as SS Major; Paul Prokop as Lt. Hoffman; Alain Patrick as Francoise; Catlin Adams as Girl; Mac McLaughlin as Andy
55	23	"The Hickory Dickory Dock Raid"	Frank Baur	Edward J. Lakso	February 26, 1968
From the DVD: On the Eve of a dangerous mission, Moffitt receives word that his younger brother has been killed by a German bomb in London. Guest stars: Gary Lasdun as Capt. Hunte; David Gross as 1st Sentry; Matthias Uitz as 2nd Sentry
56	24	"The Tug Of War Raid"	Jack N. Reddish	Mark Weingart	March 4, 1968
Troy goes undercover to get microfilm from a French Resistance fighter, but they are captured by Dietrich. After Troy refuses to give up the location of the microfilm, Dietrich sentences both to death. Troy must find a way to contact the Rat Patrol for rescue. Guest stars: Michael Shillo as Gaspard; Brioni Farrell as Felicia; Guy Danfort as Doctor; Murray Roman as Lt. Pohl; Bo Hopkins as Bo Randall; Nick Dimitri as German Soldier (uncredited)
57	25	"The Never Say Die Raid"	Herschel Daugherty	Dean Hargrove	March 11, 1968
Troy and Hitchcock are captured by a German colonel who has a scheme to use them to radio false information back to their headquarters. Meanwhile, Moffitt and Pettigrew's rescue attempts are complicated by an Italian officer who wants to surrender to them. Guest stars: Fabrizio Mioni as Lt. Cristalde; Frank Marth as Col. von Bracht; Tommy Cook as Cefalu; Kurt Landen as Guard; Budd Albright as Lt. Koss (uncredited)
58	26	"The Kill at Koorlea Raid"	Eddie Davis	Edward J. Lakso	March 18, 1968
The Rat Patrol is ordered to go with a Rhodesian sniper on a mission to kill a German general, but Troy decides to try to capture the general alive. Guest stars: William Watson as Corporal Freebairn; Morgan Jones as Capt. Boggs; Manfred Lating as Lt. Sturm; Phil Bruns as Gen. Karl Koenig "The Butcher"
