= List of The Mod Squad episodes =

This is a list of episodes for the television series The Mod Squad.

== Series overview ==
Season	Episodes	Originally released	
Season	Episodes	First released	Last released
1	26	September 24, 1968	April 15, 1969
2	26	September 23, 1969	April 7, 1970
3	24	September 22, 1970	March 23, 1971
4	24	September 14, 1971	March 7, 1972
5	24	September 14, 1972	March 1, 1973
Television film		May 18, 1979	

== Episodes ==
=== Season 1 (1968–69) ===
No. overall	No. in season	Title	Directed by	Written by	Original release date
1	1	"The Teeth of the Barracuda"	Lee H. Katzin	Tony Barrett	September 24, 1968
The origin of the Mod Squad: After one of Greer's undercover associates was murdered at a psychedelic nightclub, he puts his newly-formed undercover squad of young adults, all previously in trouble with the law, to work investigating, which the evidence suggests was the work of young people. Produced as a 90-minute pilot (73 minutes without commercials), this episode was edited for a 60-minute slot. Guest stars: Brooke Bundy, Lonny Chapman, Noam Pitlik, and Robert DoQui. Uncredited cameos by Harrison Ford and Richard Pryor.
2	2	"Bad Man on Campus"	Earl Bellamy	Robert Heverly	October 1, 1968
Following the death of a high school teacher, the Squad work undercover at her school to investigate a juvenile car theft ring, and the circumstances that led to the teacher's death. Guest stars: Booker Bradshaw, Judy Pace, J. Pat O'Malley, and Norman Alden.
3	3	"My, What a Pretty Bus"	Gene Nelson	Gwen Bagni & Paul Dubov	October 8, 1968
The Squad work with a wily ex-con on a big counterfeiting caper, in which real money destined for the treasury is swapped with not only counterfeit money, but also a counterfeit Volkswagen Bus used to transport it. Guest stars: Henry Jones, Byron Morrow, Paul Sorensen, Pepper Martin, and Val Avery.
4	4	"When Smitty Comes Marching Home"	George McCowan	Tony Barrett & Harve Bennett	October 22, 1968
Returning Vietnam veteran Smitty, being sought by police on a homicide charge, turns to his boyhood friend Linc for help proving his innocence. Guest stars: Louis Gossett Jr., Art Lewis, and Edward Faulkner.
5	5	"You Can't Tell the Players Without a Programmer"	Earl Bellamy	Story by : Gwen Bagni & Paul Dubov; Teleplay by : Gwen Bagni, Paul Dubov & Stephen Kandel	October 29, 1968
Julie serves as a decoy as the Mod Squad attempts to sting a computer-dating service operating in blackmail. Guest stars: Linda Marsh, Julie Adams, Mark Goddard, Byron Foulger, Harry Basch, and Art Metrano.
6	6	"A Time to Love, a Time to Cry"	Michael Caffey	Mel Goldberg, Warren Hamilton Jr. & Donald Wrye	November 12, 1968
A probation officer (Robert Lansing) with an eye for Julie joins the Squad in its search for a young photographer accused of murder. Harry Townes and Rex Holman guest star.
7	7	"Find Tara Chapman!"	Gene Nelson	Harve Bennett & Arthur Weingarten	November 19, 1968
The Squad tries desperately to track down a dying girl on the run who may unwittingly spark a meningitis epidemic. The girl is also wanted by the Mafia as she witnessed a mob killing in New York City before she fled to California. Guest stars: Yvonne Craig, Della Reese, John van Dreelen, Mills Watson, Peter Leeds, and Sid Melton.
8	8	"The Price of Terror"	Earl Bellamy	Tony Barrett	November 26, 1968
Greer is the target of an unknown assailant who has rigged a number of "close calls" to intimidate him. Guest stars: James Best, Gail Kobe, Richard Bakalyan, Herb Vigran, and Harry Basch.
9	9	"A Quiet Weekend in the Country"	Jack Arnold	Tony Barrett & Jackson Gillis	December 3, 1968
Pete, Linc and Julie go undercover as vacationers in a rural trailer camp to investigate the death of a narcotics informant. Guest stars: James Gregory, Ahna Capri, Dub Taylor, Irene Hervey, and Bruce Glover.
10	10	"Love"	Lee H. Katzin	Story by : Tige Andrews, Jack Marlando & Tom Carota; Teleplay by : Henry Rosenbaum	December 10, 1968
Pete's beloved cousin Karen (Diana Ewing) turns to crime in a desperate attempt to win the attention of her wealthy parents, made worse when she kidnapped her baby sister. Guest stars: Nina Foch, Arthur Franz, and Isabel Sanford.
11	11	"Twinkle, Twinkle, Little Starlet"	George McCowan	Jerome Ross	December 17, 1968
With Pete and Linc close by, Julie poses as a Hollywood starlet to lure into the open a serial assailant preying upon young actresses. Guest stars: Richard Evans, Joan Van Ark, William Smithers, Alan Oppenheimer, Ben Wright, Virginia Gregg, and Norman Grabowski.
12	12	"The Guru"	Richard Rush	Leigh Chapman	December 31, 1968
Pete, Linc and Julie go undercover as hippies to investigate the bombing of The Guru, an underground newspaper. Guest stars: Dabney Coleman, Jane Elliot, Max Julien, and Adam Roarke. (Uncredited appearance by a pre-Brady Bunch Barry Williams as a newspaper boy.)
13	13	"The Sunday Drivers"	Gene Nelson	Edward J. Lakso	January 7, 1969
Pete and Linc join an automobile thrill circus in Las Vegas to investigate the death of Linc's stunt-driver friend -- who was making money at something besides driving.
14	14	"Hello Mother, My Name Is Julie"	Jack Arnold	Gwen Bagni & Paul Dubov	January 14, 1969
Julie's mother, a former prostitute, arrives in Los Angeles to introduce Julie to the man she plans to marry: a bank robber under investigation by Pete and Linc.
15	15	"Flight Five Doesn't Answer"	George McCowan	Stephen Kandel	January 21, 1969
While transporting a prisoner by commercial airline, Pete, Linc and Greer face death in a forced plane crash, brought on by the prisoner's foes on the ground.
16	16	"Shell Game"	Gene Nelson	Edward J. Lakso	January 29, 1969
Investigating a policeman's death, Pete and Linc infiltrate a gang of thieves, only to find the gang has kidnapped Julie.
17	17	"Fear Is the Bucking Horse"	George McCowan	Tony Barrett	February 4, 1969
The Squad works a rodeo undercover to protect a TV cowboy star whose life has been threatened.
18	18	"A Hint of Darkness, a Hint of Light"	Earl Bellamy	Edward J. Lakso	February 11, 1969
The Squad moves into a blind woman's home, posing as houseguests, to offer protection against a mysterious assailant. Guest starred Gloria Foster (wife of star Clarence Williams III).
19	19	"The Uptight Town"	Earl Bellamy	Norman Katkov	February 18, 1969
The Squad searches for Captain Greer, who has disappeared while vacationing in a little desert town, only to find the townspeople not particularly helpful. Guest stars: Jason Evers, Cliff Osmond, and Louis Gossett Jr.
20	20	"A Reign of Guns"	Gene Nelson	Tony Barrett & Daniel B. Ullman	February 25, 1969
Pete and Linc tangle with a wealthy arch-conservative bigot who is forming a private militia (an "army of patriots") armed with stolen rifles and ammunition.
21	21	"A Run for the Money"	Harvey Hart	Edward J. Lakso	March 11, 1969
Pete, romantically involved with a girl whose father (Tom Bosley) is in prison for robbery, faces a dilemma after finding himself behind bars after finding the stolen cash.
22	22	"Child of Sorrow, Child of Light"	Gene Nelson	Cliff Gould	March 18, 1969
After a mother died in a car bomb after losing her baby in an adoption scam, Julie poses as an unwed expectant mother to get deeper inside an extortion racket that blackmails parents of adopted babies. Guest stars: Ida Lupino and Daniel J. Travanti.
23	23	"Keep the Faith, Baby"	Gene Nelson	Harve Bennett	March 25, 1969
The Squad is assigned to protect the life of a black priest (Sammy Davis Jr.), who was defrocked for his liberal views on society, before being threatened by a murderer (Robert Duvall) who is afraid he will break his seal of confession. William Schallert also guest starred.
24	24	"Captain Greer, Call Surgery"	Earl Bellamy	Anthony Lawrence	April 1, 1969
The Squad get undercover jobs in a hospital to block narcotics theft; the hospital's head nurse was desperate to not get involved, while an orderly involved in the theft is estranged from his dying father at the same hospital.
25	25	"Peace Now – Arly Blau"	Gene Nelson	William Wood	April 8, 1969
Linc and Pete go undercover as prison inmates to protect the life of a convicted draft dodger.
26	26	"A Seat by the Window"	Michael Caffey	Edward J. Lakso	April 15, 1969
The Squad is split up and assigned to separate charter vacation buses in an attempt to catch a bus station killer.

=== Season 2 (1969–70) ===
No. overall	No. in season	Title	Directed by	Written by	Original release date
27	1	"The Girl in Chair Nine"	Gene Nelson	William Bast	September 23, 1969
The Squad works with a psychic (Cesare Danova) in finding the whereabouts of a woman who did not show up for night school, but later discovered to be kidnapped in relation to an illegal abortion.
28	2	"My Name Is Manolette"	Robert Michael Lewis	Margaret Armen	September 30, 1969
The Squad "adopts" a 9-year-old Mexican waif who has been abandoned by a gang of American thieves.
29	3	"An Eye for an Eye"	Earl Bellamy	Tony Barrett	October 7, 1969
Greer falls in love with an attractive widow, unwittingly making her the kidnapping target of a narcotics gang.
30	4	"Ride the Man Down"	George McCowan	William Clark	October 14, 1969
Pete finds himself framed for murder after he helps a young woman who claims to be in trouble. Guest stars include Richard Anderson.
31	5	"To Linc – with Love"	George McCowan	Carol Sobieski	October 21, 1969
While pursuing a driver's license renewal at the DMV, Linc falls in love with one of its inspectors: an attractive young woman. However, their romance is threatened when a man from her past turns up: her ex-husband who seeks to reconcile their relationship.
32	6	"Lisa"	Robert Michael Lewis	Steffi Barrett & Tony Barrett	November 4, 1969
The Squad is called in to protect a successful woman writer (Carolyn Jones) with a split personality whose life has been threatened.
33	7	"Confrontation!"	Gene Nelson	George Bellak	November 11, 1969
During the student strike at a local university to demand changes in a school policy, a black student is found murdered on campus, with the police claiming that one of the students murdered him. The Squad is called in to investigate, though they fear that the strike would turn into a riot if the suspect was not brought forward. Guest stars include Richard Pryor.
34	8	"Willie Poor Boy"	George McCowan	Richard H. Landau	November 18, 1969
Pete befriends a young man from Appalachia (Joe Don Baker) caught in a vending machine robbery after learning that the suspect is illiterate. Daniel J. Travanti also guest starred.
35	9	"The Death of Wild Bill Hannachek"	Earl Bellamy	Mark Saha	November 25, 1969
The Squad works undercover at a country-western bar as they investigate the death of a fading country-western singer. Guest stars include Tyne Daly.
36	10	"A Place to Run, a Heart to Hide In"	Earl Bellamy	Robert Heverly & Edward J. Lakso	December 2, 1969
The Squad poses as college students at a prestigious college, investigating a mysterious death of a young fraternity pledge, and possible ties to a rich donor (Don DeFore) and his aspiring football quarterback son.
37	11	"The Healer"	Earl Bellamy	Gwen Bagni & Paul Dubov	December 9, 1969
The Squad investigate the activities of a quack after one of his patients dies of mysterious circumstances, while another dies of a hit-and-run accident during the funeral service.
38	12	"In This Corner – Sol Alpert"	Robert Michael Lewis	Harve Bennett & Rita Lakin	December 16, 1969
After television mechanic Sol Alpert (introduced the previous season in "Flight Five Doesn't Answer", played by Marvin Kaplan) was being wrongfully blamed for slum-like conditions at neighborhood apartments, Pete, Linc and Julie try to find the landlord responsible - which turned out to be Sol's cousin (Noam Pitlik). With the police helpless in this case, as the Squad know about the Alperts' Jewish faith, they get help from a higher authority. Henry Silva also guest starred.
39	13	"Never Give the Fuzz an Even Break"	Earl Bellamy	Malvin Wald	December 23, 1969
The Squad tries to gain the confidence of the top con man in the business and catch him by becoming involved in a caper.
40	14	"The Debt"	Jerry Jameson	Steffi Barrett & Tony Barrett	December 30, 1969
After a young man helps Pete when he is attacked by hoodlums, Pete learns the man's father may be plotting a serious crime. Guest stars: Marj Dusay, Nehemiah Persoff, and Jay Novello. Note: Peggy Lipton does not appear in this episode.
41	15	"Sweet Child of Terror"	Earl Bellamy	Edward J. Lakso	January 6, 1970
An embittered handyman who claims to be related to Billy the Kid kidnaps Julie, thinking that she was a socialite friend of hers, but threatens her life when he realizes his mistake.
42	16	"The King of Empty Cups"	Robert Michael Lewis	Sonya Roberts	January 20, 1970
Assigned to find Chief Metcalf's daughter after she disappears, the Squad's investigation leads to a pop singing idol - and to a life controlled by drugs.
43	17	"A Town Called Sincere"	Earl Bellamy	Gwen Bagni & Paul Dubov	January 27, 1970
A sleepy Mexican town becomes a prison for Pete and Linc, captured by a savage motorcycle gang. The bikers center their terror tactics on the townspeople as they try to learn who killed two members of their gang. Note: Peggy Lipton does not appear in this episode.
44	18	"The Exile"	Robert Michael Lewis	Harve Bennett & Don Richman	February 3, 1970
Julie falls in love with an exchange student, not knowing he is a Middle Eastern prince, and an heir to the throne in a country embroiled in a civil war.
45	19	"Survival House"	George McCowan	Joanna Lee	February 10, 1970
A founder of a halfway house for drug addicts (Sammy Davis Jr.) is wrongfully accused of statutory rape of a minor. Pete and Linc work undercover as tenants to find the person who framed him.
46	20	"Mother of Sorrow"	Gene Nelson	Rita Lakin & William Wood	February 17, 1970
Pete's old eccentric classmate (Richard Dreyfuss) confessed to the Squad of murdering his girlfriend - and also has the pictures to prove it - yet he refused to tell Greer anything. He later divulged plans to give his mother (Lee Grant) the same photo finish. (In 1997, TV Guide ranked this episode #95 on its list of the 100 Greatest Episodes.)
47	21	"The Deadly Sin"	Jerry Jameson	Robert M. Young	February 24, 1970
A nun returns home, only to witness her father murdering one of his associates as a mob hit. He must decide whether to spare his daughter, or kill her to appease his underworld superiors.
48	22	"A Time for Remembering"	Gene Nelson	Harve Bennett	March 3, 1970
In a sequel to The Teeth of the Barracuda, as the Squad celebrate their second anniversary together, Pete contemplates leaving the Squad to join his father in his family's business, until an ex-convict related to their first case shot Linc in an act of revenge. A clip show, including clips from Barracuda, plus My, What a Pretty Bus, Flight Five Doesn't Answer, The Sunday Drivers, The Death of Wild Bill Hannachek, and The King of Empty Cups. (Florence Halop appears as a nurse.)
49	23	"Return to Darkness, Return to Light"	Robert Michael Lewis	Edward J. Lakso	March 17, 1970
In a sequel to A Hint of Darkness, a Hint of Light, Linc's blind friend announced that she was engaged to a doctor. What she didn't know was that the "doctor" was actually a career impostor, complicated by the fact that he was targeted by a man for malpractice committed by the real doctor. Gloria Foster reprises her role as the blind woman.
50	24	"Call Back Yesterday"	Gene Nelson	John W. Bloch & Robert M. Young	March 24, 1970
Pete's mother re-enters her son's life when the Squad investigates one of her friends: a chemical company executive who was mentally ill.
51	25	"Should Auld Acquaintance Be Forgot!"	Robert Michael Lewis	Harve Bennett & Rita Lakin	March 31, 1970
Posing as production personnel at a movie studio, the Squad probes a series of mishaps tied to a film about a cold case involving a 1948 string of murders, with an ending that someone didn't want filmed. Guest stars: Frank Converse and Ed Asner.
52	26	"The Loser"	Gene Nelson	Sheldon Stark	April 7, 1970
The Squad investigates a hit-and-run accident involving a stolen car when a young suspect (David Cassidy) pleads his innocence; he would later be released on bail by a mysterious figure. Meanwhile, an election candidate is a victim of blackmail related to the case, saying he would tell the truth about the hit-and-run unless he pays. Guest stars include Marion Ross.

=== Season 3 (1970–71) ===
No. overall	No. in season	Title	Directed by	Written by	Original release date
53	1	"The Long Road Home"	Robert Michael Lewis	Edward J. Lakso	September 22, 1970
Pete falls in love with a young woman he has injured in an auto chase involving a robbery suspect, only to learn she is the sister of the suspect.
54	2	"See the Eagles Dying"	Jerry Jameson	Edward J. Lakso	September 29, 1970
The Squad investigate a motorcycling and skydiving group following the death of a wino who died when he failed to pull his ripcord during a group skydiving expedition, while intoxicated. The parents of one of their members, a daughter of an upper-class couple, are also concerned that she was mixing up with the wrong crowd. Guest stars include Lane Bradbury.
55	3	"Who Are the Keepers, Who Are the Inmates?"	Gene Nelson	Richard Landau	October 6, 1970
Linc feigns insanity to get into an institution to investigate the death of a friend there, finding out that one of the doctors there used electroconvulsive therapy as a method of punishment.
56	4	"‘A’ Is for Annie"	Robert Michael Lewis	William Bast	October 13, 1970
The Squad investigates when a school teacher, under attack for her views on sex education, becomes the target of violence during the political campaign of a politician who used the abolition of sex education as its platform.
57	5	"The Song of Willie"	Gene Nelson	Steffi Barrett & Tony Barrett	October 20, 1970
Linc works undercover as an assistant to his childhood friend, movie star Willie Rush (Sammy Davis, Jr.), after an attempt on his life with an ill-timed car bomb on the movie set. But concerning Linc more was Willie's cavalier lifestyle and attitude, created in part due to Willie's fear that he may have Huntington's disease.
58	6	"Search and Destroy"	Philip Leacock	David P. Harmon	October 27, 1970
An army officer, a former police detective, took a leave from the Vietnam War to volunteer himself to assist Greer and the Squad in the investigation of the death of his brother. While Greer suspected that an undercover cop was doubling as a drug pusher, the officer mistakenly suspected that Pete was that crooked cop.
59	7	"Just Ring the Bell Once"	Jerry Jameson	Gwen Bagni & Paul Dubov	November 3, 1970
Linc befriends an 8-year-old diabetic boy whose young mother was just released from jail after being involved with liquor hijackers. With his mother still indecisive on whether or not to resume parenting him, and the deadline to make a decision nears, the child's future hangs in the balance.
60	8	"Welcome to the Human Race, Levi Frazee!"	Robert Michael Lewis	Walter Black	November 10, 1970
Pete and the Squad try to clear an Apache (Henry Silva) falsely accused of murdering a man in a small desert town.
61	9	"A Far Away Place So Near"	Terry Becker	Theodore Apstein	November 17, 1970
The Squad investigates the mysterious death of a soldier who fails to return from Vietnam.
62	10	"A Time of Hyacinths"	Robert Michael Lewis	Margaret Armen	December 1, 1970
Julie becomes involved with a mysterious stranger (Vincent Price), a movie actor believed to have died twenty years earlier.
63	11	"The Judas Trap"	Robert Michael Lewis	Story by : Alvin Boretz; Teleplay by : Walter Black	December 8, 1970
Pete makes friends with an autistic teenage boy, who was "17, going on 12" - he was the prime suspect in the murder of his father, an ROTC captain.
64	12	"Fever"	Jerry Jameson	Story by : Paul Schneider, Margaret Schneider & Marty Roth; Teleplay by : Paul Schneider & Margaret Schneider	December 15, 1970
A man on the run, with the son he doesn't have legal custody of, kidnaps Julie. However, as both have Rocky Mountain spotted fever, she is more concerned for their lives than hers.
65	13	"Is There Anyone Left in Santa Paula?"	Lawrence Dobkin	Gene L. Coon	December 29, 1970
Following a death of an immigration agent at a car wash where an undocumented immigrant (and a friend of Pete's) work, the Squad finds a cop involved in the illegal entry of Mexican youths across the border - all tied to a village in Sonora. The officer and Greer are at odds on how to handle the case.
66	14	"A Short Course in War"	Robert Michael Lewis	Mann Rubin	January 5, 1971
An attention-starved misfit gunman (Bob Balaban) hell-bent on starting a "war" with the establishment infiltrates a student protest with Julie trapped as one of the hostages. Also among the hostages is her humanities teacher (Josephine Hutchinson) who has a heart condition but left her medication in her car.
67	15	"Kicks Incorporated"	Gene Nelson	Peggy O'Shea	January 12, 1971
The Squad investigates a unique nuisance racket headed by a man who turns out to be a close friend of Greer (Jack Cassidy). Features a special appearance by Danny Thomas as himself.
68	16	"A Bummer for R.J."	Philip Leacock	Jack Turley	January 19, 1971
The Squad investigates a 40-year-old man (Carl Betz) who tries the hippie life to recapture his youth after he was implicated in a murder. Meanwhile, his daughter, whom he lost sight of following a divorce, was in town in hopes of reuniting. Guest stars include Daniel J. Travanti.
69	17	"The Hot, Hot Car"	Robert Michael Lewis	Elroy Schwartz	January 26, 1971
A car belonging to a businessman's associate has been stolen. However, the investigation becomes dire after Greer learns that that car was rigged with dynamite, as the businessman wanted to commit murder. The Squad rush to find the car before the dynamite explodes at 5 p.m., potentially killing an innocent family who rented it.
70	18	"Suffer, Little Children"	Lawrence Dobkin	Gene L. Coon	February 9, 1971
The Squad helps a minister find out who murdered his brother, a psychologist who ran a clinic for troubled youngsters. Besides differing ideologies, complicating matters was that the clinic was used to hold stolen goods before they are fenced. (Note: The clinic was previously featured briefly a couple of episodes earlier in "A Bummer for R.J." Also, an exterior scene took place at Walt Whitman High School, a fictional high school used as a setting for an ABC sitcom at the time, Room 222.)
71	19	"Is That Justice? No, It's the Law"	Philip Leacock	David H. Vowell	February 16, 1971
The Squad helps an overzealous detective get the goods on a known dope pusher, but the pusher swears he's been framed.
72	20	"A Double for Danger"	Gene Nelson	Roger Hill Lewis	February 23, 1971
After an undercover agent was killed in a pedestrian accident unrelated to her case, Julie assumes her identity to expose the leader of a narcotics ring (Ray Walston).
73	21	"Welcome to Our City"	John Llewellyn Moxey	Story by : Shirl Hendryx; Teleplay by : Tony Barrett & Shirl Hendryx	March 2, 1971
The Squad tries to find the father of a 15-year-old farm boy and learns that the man is involved in a loan shark racket.
74	22	"The Comeback"	William Crain	Mann Rubin	March 9, 1971
The Squad helps the son of an aging ex-boxing champ (Sugar Ray Robinson) who is being harassed by gamblers for inside information on his dad's return to the ring after an 11-year absence. (Featuring sports announcer Dick Enberg as himself.)
75	23	"We Spy"	Lawrence Dobkin	Harve Bennett & Walter Black	March 16, 1971
Pete poses as a safecracker in order to break up an industrial espionage plot and in the process stumbles onto a murder - as well as the young son of a businessman who is overeager in learning the art of safecracking. Guest stars include René Auberjonois.
76	24	"The Price of Love"	Philip Leacock	Tony Barrett & Robert Foster	March 23, 1971
On vacation, Linc stumbles onto the kidnapping of a young boy in a desert ghost-town and finds himself held hostage as well.

=== Season 4 (1971–72) ===
No. overall	No. in season	Title	Directed by	Written by	Original release date
77	1	"The Sentinels"	Robert Michael Lewis	Alvin Boretz	September 14, 1971
After a botched payroll robbery led to a shooting death, the Squad searches the city for a stolen car that harbored a flock of pigeons which could cause an encephalitis epidemic.
78	2	"Cricket"	Michael Caffey	Rick Husky	September 21, 1971
An autistic and withdrawn boy who has accidentally shot Julie is sought by the Squad in order to save him from a murderer. (Note: This episode was remade as the Charlie's Angels season one episode To Kill an Angel.)
79	3	"Home Is the Streets"	Barry Shear	S.S. Schweitzer	September 28, 1971
The Squad pursues a dope pusher on the run for shooting two policemen.
80	4	"Survival"	Philip Leacock	Walter Black & Byron Twiggs	October 5, 1971
Julie, suffering a snake bite, is left stranded in the desert with a blind man (John Rubinstein) on a mysterious mission when three young hoodlums steal her car.
81	5	"Color of Laughter, Color of Tears"	Philip Leacock	Edward J. Lakso	October 12, 1971
The Squad investigates a circus carnival that is being sabotaged before its opening day. The circus' owner, Joe Walton (Ed Asner), vows the show will go on, despite it being in more danger of additional accidents.
82	6	"The Medicine Men"	Seymour Robbie	Arthur Weingarten	October 19, 1971
Julie falls in love with a young doctor who is being blackmailed by one of his fellow students from medical school.
83	7	"The Sands of Anger"	Earl Bellamy	Edward J. Lakso	October 26, 1971
The Squad investigates a mysterious explosion that kills a driver at a dune-buggy rally in the desert. Guest stars include Shelly Novack and Tony Dow.
84	8	"The Poisoned Mind"	Don McDougall	Ernest Frankel	November 2, 1971
Depressed after having shot a young man during a burglary, Greer takes time off to recover. However, while on vacation, he found himself poisoned by a slow-acting poison that could kill him, leading to the Squad to go on a race against time to find the criminal. Guest stars include Laraine Stephens, Jean Byron, and Wesley Lau.
85	9	"Exit the Closer"	Don McDougall	Robert Collins	November 9, 1971
The Squad go undercover to investigate an irreputable used car dealer (Larry Blyden). However, after attempts to murder him, they found out that a mob ring owns the lot, and the "owner" was, in reality, a pawn used for cover. Guest stars include Ruta Lee.
86	10	"Whatever Happened to Linc Hayes?"	George McCowan	Rick Husky	November 16, 1971
Suffering from amnesia after getting mugged, Linc wanders Skid Row, unsure as to whether or not he is the escaped mental patient he reads about in a newspaper. The second clip show of the series, which includes flashbacks to previous episodes Bad Man on Campus, My, What a Pretty Bus, and Who Are the Keepers, Who Are the Inmates?
87	11	"And a Little Child Shall Bleed Them"	John Llewellyn Moxey	Steffi Barrett & Tony Barrett	November 23, 1971
The Squad tries to protect a TV clown (Milton Berle) whose life is in danger.
88	12	"Real Loser"	George McGowan	Robert C. Dennis	November 30, 1971
The Squad defends a drug dealer (Martin Sheen), whose daughter is a sick child in need of medical care; his associate has marked him for murder. Guest stars include Harold Gould.
89	13	"Death of a Nobody"	Robert Michael Lewis	Mann Rubin	December 7, 1971
A woman is killed by a hit-and-run driver, but Pete is sure he was the intended victim.
90	14	"Feet of Clay"	Don Taylor	Don Ingalls	December 14, 1971
Linc befriends a deaf-mute (Desi Arnaz, Jr.) who becomes a reluctant hero after saving a guard's life in a warehouse fire. But his status of being a "hero" comes into question after a second guard was discovered in the charred ruins - dead.
91	15	"I Am My Brother's Keeper"	Jerry Jameson	James Schmerer	January 4, 1972
Pete was struck by a hit-and-run driver while undercover as a union member to gather information from an informant - who was shot and killed by the same guys. Hospitalized with a brain injury that may prove fatal if untreated, Pete is adamant on finishing his assignment. The rest of the Squad race to find Pete before his brain injury - or the mobsters - kills him first.
92	16	"Deal with the Devil"	Don McDougall	Robert C. Dennis	January 11, 1972
A gonzo journalist (Leslie Nielsen), who was Pete's older friend of his in his childhood, returned from a reporting stint in Vietnam with information about the war - and a suitcase full of heroin, which gone missing. Pete and the Squad need to find the heroin before the journalist finds it, or his foes find him.
93	17	"Kill Gently, Sweet Jessie"	Lawrence Dobkin	Steffi Barrett & Tony Barrett	January 18, 1972
A man convicted of manslaughter is released on parole, vowing to find and kill Pete, who he mistakenly believes was responsible for a savage beating he suffered years earlier.
94	18	"Shockwave"	Barry Shear	Rick Husky	January 25, 1972
Julie becomes emotionally attached to an abandoned baby whose parents are terrorizing the area with armed robberies.
95	19	"No More Oak Leaves for Ernie Holland"	Seymour Robbie	Arthur Weingarten	February 1, 1972
Ernie Holland (Robert Pine), a plainclothes cop fresh from his tour of duty in the Vietnam War, assists the Squad in finding a stolen cache of guns. However, his military-style method of operation clashes with the Squad's more diplomatic approach as they deal with an idealistic protest group leader (Henry Silva).
96	20	"The Cave"	Jerry Jameson	Don Ingalls	February 8, 1972
Pete, Linc and Julie are trapped in a cave by a crazed man who holds them responsible for his son's death in Vietnam.
97	21	"The Wild Weekend"	Robert Michael Lewis	Jack Turley	February 15, 1972
Pete is kidnapped and almost killed by the jealous boyfriend of his former fiancée.
98	22	"The Tangled Web"	Richard Newton	Ernest Frankel	February 22, 1972
Pete and Linc jeopardize their lives and careers by helping Julie's friend return the jewelry he has stolen.
99	23	"Outside Position"	Philip Leacock	S.S. Schweitzer	February 29, 1972
Pete tries to help an ex-convict (Bobby Sherman) who has been framed on a narcotics charge.
100	24	"Big George"	Philip Leacock	Richard Landau	March 7, 1972
The family of a man (Andy Griffith) who witnessed a murder entered a living hell after receiving death threats, which led to their neighbors shunning them as if they were pariahs. The Squad comes to their aid as they search for the man who desired to avenge his partner's arrest and prosecution.

=== Season 5 (1972–73) ===
No. overall	No. in season	Title	Directed by	Written by	Original release date
101	1	"The Connection: Part 1"	George McCowan	Rick Husky	September 14, 1972
When Greer is seriously hurt by three phony cops (one of these a drug dealer whom Greer had previously apprehended), and four suitcases of heroin belonging to a crime syndicate are stolen, Sgt. Ed Lassiter (Ed Asner) leads the Squad on their most challenging assignment ever, looking at every possible connection. One of these is a jazz trumpeter (Richard Pryor) who was marked for death. The other a mother who's a heroin addict, who was due to give birth to another child. First half of a two-hour special. Guest stars include Robert Reed, Cesar Romero, Barbara McNair, Cleavon Little, Stefanie Powers, and Gene Washington (of the San Francisco 49ers).
102	2	"The Connection: Part 2"	George McCowan	Rick Husky	September 14, 1972
Second half of the two-hour special: three of the suspects were found dead, one of them with a clue that could lead to the stolen heroin. Also, Pete and Julie risk their lives gathering evidence of the syndicate's plan of distributing the heroin while attending an upscale party of one of its henchmen. And Sgt. Lassiter harbors a dark secret that would not only affect his career, but also his future. (Episode ends with Michael Cole in a voice-over afterward, urging mothers with a drug problem to seek help.)
103	3	"The Thunder Makers"	Jerry Jameson	Jack Turley	September 21, 1972
The Squad investigates when a youth (Bobby Sherman) joins a motorcycle gang, plots a fake payroll robbery of his father's company, and learns the other gang members are playing it for real.
104	4	"Yesterday's Ashes"	Richard Newton	Skip Webster	September 28, 1972
The Squad witnesses a shoplifting by a badly scarred woman and arranges plastic surgery, believing it would prevent her from a life of crime. However, her partner in crime is counting on her to join him in holding up a bank. Guest stars include Jo Ann Harris, Robert Pine, and Ivor Francis.
105	5	"A Gift for Jenny"	Don McDougall	Gerald Sanford	October 5, 1972
Linc's friend is kidnapped after receiving a fur coat as a gift, setting the Squad on a chase of a fur-theft ring. Guest stars include Paul Richards and Bo Svenson.
106	6	"Taps, Play It Louder"	E.W. Swackhamer	Sandor Stern	October 12, 1972
The Squad finds a missing ex-soldier working as a longshoreman, but because of mysterious circumstances they question his identity.
107	7	"Eyes of the Beholder"	Richard Newton	Steffi Barrett & Tony Barrett	October 19, 1972
The brother of a fur thief attempts to kill Pete, holding him responsible for his brother's death. Meanwhile, a blind childhood friend of Pete's returns home for an operation that would give her the ability to see, though her surgeon fears the positive results may not be permanent.
108	8	"Good Times Are Just Memories"	Ivan Dixon	Richard Bluel & Fenton Hobart Jr.	October 26, 1972
A police lieutenant (and longtime friend of Greer) accidentally kills his accomplice in a jewel theft ring. Desiring to cover his tracks, he planted evidence implicating Pete, working on a related case, as a murderer. Greer, however, was skeptical on the authenticity of the evidence, leading to him, Linc and Julie to dig deeper. (Guest stars include Tyne Daly.)
109	9	"Corbey"	Richard Newton	Jack Turley	November 2, 1972
When Greer is framed as being on the take, the Squad begins an investigation to clear his name. Complicating things is a boy who became handicapped after being injured by Greer a few years earlier during a shootout.
110	10	"Can You Hear Me Out There?"	Seymour Robbie	Stanley Ralph Ross	November 9, 1972
The Squad's investigation turns up a radio disc jockey (Louis Gossett Jr.) who was an unwitting helper of an auto-theft ring when his commercial indicated where stolen cars could be picked up. Guest stars include Henry Silva.
111	11	"Another Final Game"	Jerry Jameson	Buddy Ruskin	November 16, 1972
A con man (Clu Gulager) poses as a U.S. marshal to steal $600 from an elderly liquor store owner (Zara Cully). When Linc found out that she was taken in, Pete and Julie assume the roles of a wealthy young couple to lure the bad guy.
112	12	"Crime Club"	Don McDougall	Theodore J. Flicker	November 23, 1972
A group of students with genius IQs at a prestigious university pull off a series of bizarre headline-making robberies. But when a security guard dies of a heart attack during a heist, they expanded their activity list to include murder.
113	13	"The Twain"	Georg Olden	Skip Webster	November 30, 1972
When a Korean girl witnessed a hit man (Vic Tayback) murdering a passport forger, the Squad comes to her aid. Immigration officials were also looking for her, as she overstayed on her visa while looking for her long lost father.
114	14	"Belinda, End of Little Miss Bubble Gum"	Seymour Robbie	Bryn Morgan	December 7, 1972
The Squad protects a former child star, upon whose life attempts were made when she became eligible for money held in trust for her. Guest stars include Catherine Burns, Bob Balaban, Ruth Roman, Dane Clark, and John Karlen.
115	15	"Kristie"	Richard Newton	Rick Husky	December 14, 1972
On Christmas Eve, a 5-year-old girl is left in Pete's care by her father (Michael Anderson, Jr.) who then disappears.
116	16	"Sanctuary"	Jerry Jameson	Robert Hamner	December 21, 1972
Julie goes into hiding at a local hospital after posing as a secretary to a crime lord (Victor Buono) to collect evidence to present to the grand jury. After finding out where she was, he blackmails a doctor into giving her special treatments that could alter her testimony, or even kill her.
117	17	"Run, Lincoln, Run"	Leonard Horn	Donald L. Stewart	January 4, 1973
A pair of loan sharks murdered a restaurant owner over a loan, and are out looking for its two witnesses - one an injured Vietnam vet whose their "customer", and his friend, Linc.
118	18	"Don't Kill My Child"	Harry Falk	Margaret Schneider & Paul Schneider	January 18, 1973
A stepfather of a little boy confesses to beating him; however, the Squad speculates he was covering for the boy's mentally-ill mother.
119	19	"Death in High Places"	Don McDougall	Robert Hamner	January 25, 1973
After Linc's Hispanic friend is accused of the murder of his co-worker at a construction site, Linc goes undercover as a worker, only to find that corporate executives - and trouble - also roam the sites. Guest stars include Jim Backus.
120	20	"Put Out the Welcome Mat for Death"	Reza Badiyi	Elroy Schwartz	February 1, 1973
A nurse stealing morphine for her addict son indirectly led to the death of a terminally-ill cancer patient, creating undue strife for her husband.
121	21	"Scion of Death"	Daniel Haller	Robert Schlitt & Skip Webster	February 8, 1973
Pete and Linc witness a kidnapping of a son of a newspaper publisher, but his father refuses to report the abduction to the police. After Greer and the Squad got involved, it was revealed that an ex-servant of the publisher was involved.
122	22	"The Night Holds Terror"	Richard Newton	Rick Husky	February 15, 1973
Convalescing in the home of a doctor and his wife, Julie is terrorized by a man who vows to kill everyone in the house.
123	23	"Cry Uncle"	Phil Bondelli	Sandor Stern	February 22, 1973
Greer's Greek uncle comes to pay a visit, not realizing that he was behind a series of thefts of Cézanne's masterpieces.
124	24	"And Once for My Baby"	Richard Newton	Robert Sherman	March 1, 1973
The Squad helps prevent a $1 million heist masterminded by an ex-con whose pregnant wife may be positive for cervical cancer. Just as important as foiling the crime is letting her know that she might have the cancer. (The Squad presumably broke up some time after this episode's subject case, as its members would not rejoin forces again for another six years.)

== Television film (1979) ==
Title	Directed by	Written by	Original release date
The Return of the Mod Squad	George McCowan	Robert Janes	May 18, 1979
Six years after the last known case, Pete, Linc and Julie are called back to team up again after several attempts are made on the life of Adam Greer, their former commander, now a Deputy Chief in the LAPD and on the verge of retiring. However, they soon discover that the attempts on Greer's life were a ruse to draw them out, and that they themselves are the real targets of the would-be killer.

== Home releases ==
The entire series has been released on DVD, in the following box sets:

DVD set	Episodes	Company	Release date
The Mod Squad: Season 1, Volume 1	13	Paramount Home Video	December 18, 2007
The Mod Squad: Season 1, Volume 2	13	Paramount Home Video	March 11, 2008
The Mod Squad: Season 2, Volume 1	13	Paramount Home Video	November 25, 2008
The Mod Squad: Season 2, Volume 2	13	Paramount Home Video	May 26, 2009
The Mod Squad: Season 3, Volume 1	12	Visual Entertainment	September 24, 2013
The Mod Squad: Season 3, Volume 2	12	Visual Entertainment	September 24, 2013
The Mod Squad: Season 4, Volume 1	12	Visual Entertainment	October 1, 2013
The Mod Squad: Season 4, Volume 2	12	Visual Entertainment	October 1, 2013
The Mod Squad: The Complete Collection	124	Visual Entertainment	November 12, 2013
The Mod Squad: The Complete Collection Gift Set	124	Visual Entertainment	November 12, 2013
The Mod Squad: Season 5, Volume 1	12	Visual Entertainment	February 11, 2014
The Mod Squad: Season 5, Volume 2	12	Visual Entertainment	February 11, 2014
