= Harry Basch =

American actor and author (1926–2020)

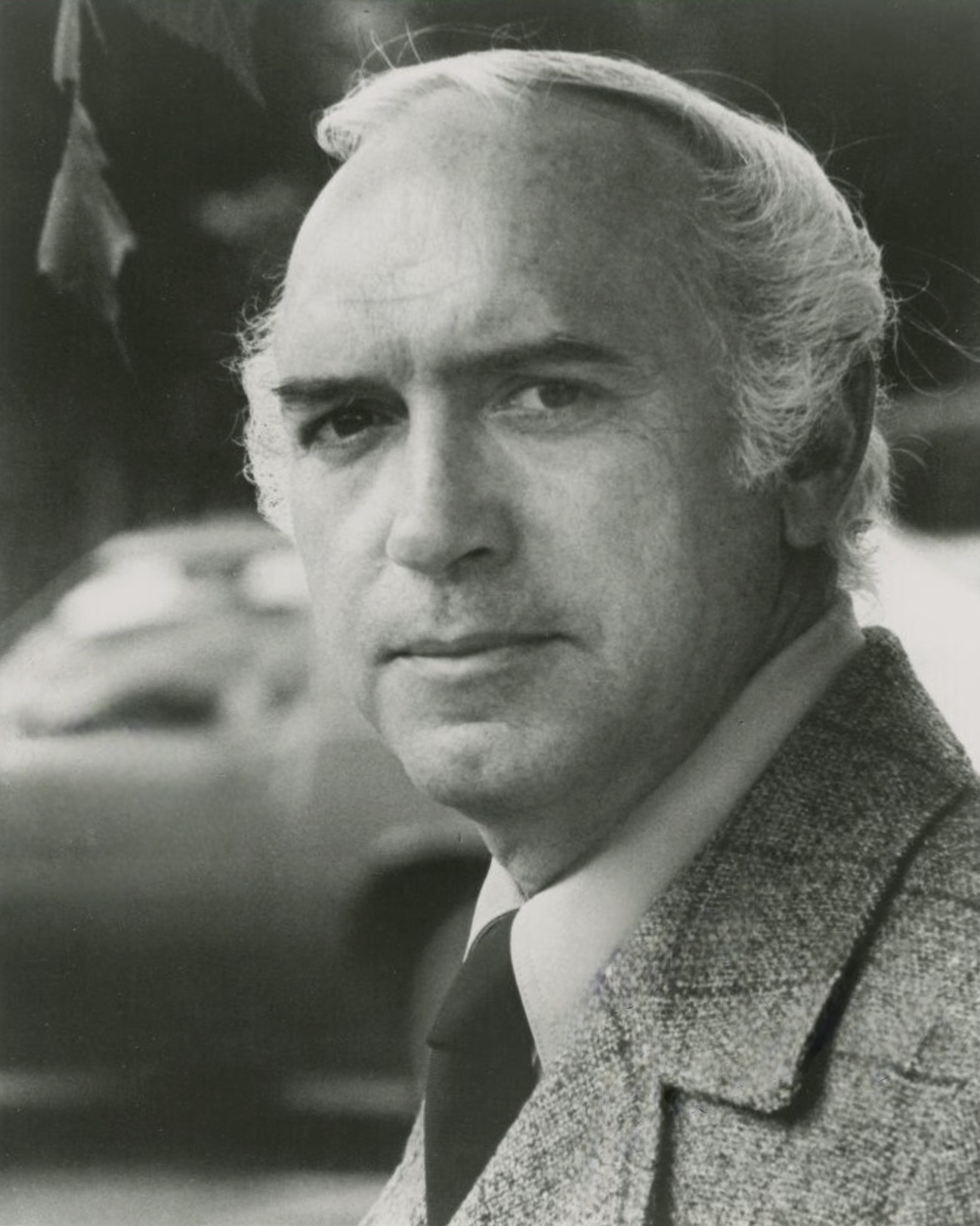
- Basch c.1970
- Born: Harry Leo Basch III; January 16, 1926; Trenton, New Jersey, U.S.
- Died: June 23, 2020 (aged 94)
- Occupations: Actor, writer
- Years active: 1963–1987

Harry Leo Basch (January 16, 1926 – June 23, 2020) was an American actor and author. In 1951 he appeared in "Mr. Roberts" at the Curran Theatre in San Francisco. He is possibly best known for his role as Vince Caproni in the 1980s television series Falcon Crest.

Basch attended Ithaca College, where he studied drama.

Basch appeared in Falcon Crest from 1982 to 1984. He also appeared as Dr. Brown in the Star Trek episode "What Are Little Girls Made Of?" in 1966.

In addition to acting, Basch wrote several articles for the Los Angeles Times about traveling. He and his wife, actress Shirley Slater, also wrote several books on the subject including RV Vacations for Dummies.

In the 1950s, Basch was married to actress Leesa Troy.

== Filmography ==
=== Film ===
- A Man Called Gannon (1968) – Ben
- Winning (1969) – The Stranger (uncredited)
- The Gang That Couldn't Shoot Straight (1971) – DeLauria
- They Only Kill Their Masters (1972) – Mayor Wendell
- The Stone Killer (1973) – Mossman
- Swashbuckler (1976) – Banana Man
- Rollercoaster (1977) – Owner #3
- Coma (1978) – Second Doctor
- F.I.S.T. (1978) – Network Announcer

=== Television ===
- General Hospital (Unknown episodes, 1963) – Armistead (1983)
- Dr. Kildare (1 episode, 1965) – Dr. Milton Bremner
- Honey West (1 episode, 1965) – Mr. Flowers
- Get Smart (3 episodes, 1965–1969) – Lucheck / Stromberg / Kaos Leader
- Burke's Law (2 episodes, 1966) – Harlan O'Brien / O'Brien
- Blue Light (1 episode, 1966) – Mueller
- Star Trek: The Original Series (1966) – Dr. Brown in S1:E7, "What Are Little Girls Made Of?"
- The F.B.I. (2 episodes, 1966) – Hotel Manager / Albertson
- Mission: Impossible (2 episodes, 1966–1968) – Nicolai / Konya
- Gunsmoke (1 episode, 1967) – Milt Agnew
- Ironside (1967, TV Movie) – Man Finding Ironside (uncredited)
- Daniel Boone (2 episodes, 1968) – Jesse Watts / The Stranger
- The Mod Squad (4 episodes, 1968–1970) – Dr. Berger / Eddie / Dr. Brandon, Psychologist
- Mannix (2 episodes, 1968–1974) – Sam Vincent / Gould
- That Girl (3 episodes, 1969–1970) – Man in Elevator / Charlie / Driver
- The Love War (1970, TV Movie) – Bal
- Bonanza (1 episode, 1972) – Prosecutor
- Sanford and Son (1 episode, 1974) – Dr. Jamison
- Nakia (1 episode, 1974) – George Cook
- Mary Hartman, Mary Hartman (1 episode, 1976) – Clyde Muncie / Engineer
- Holmes & Yo-Yo (1 episode, 1976) – Tony Papas
- Carter Country (1 episode, 1977) – Harris
- Quincy, M.E. (1 episode, 1979) – Judge
- The Waltons (1 episode, 1980) – Arthur Harrington
- Tenspeed and Brown Shoe (1 episode, 1980) – Molina
- Falcon Crest (11 episodes, 1982–1984) – Vince Caproni
- The Wizard (1 episode, 1987) – Mr. Perato
