= What Are Little Girls Made Of? =

- Star Trek: The Original Series episode
- Episode no.: Season 1 Episode 7
- Directed by: James Goldstone
- Written by: Robert Bloch
- Cinematography by: Jerry Finnerman
- Production code: 10
- Original air date: October 20, 1966

Guest appearances
- Michael Strong – Dr. Roger Korby; Sherry Jackson – Andrea; Ted Cassidy – Ruk; Harry Basch – Dr. Brown; Vince Deadrick – Security Guard Mathews; Budd Albright – Security Guard Rayburn

Episode chronology
← Previous "Mudd's Women"	Next → "Miri"
- Star Trek: The Original Series season 1

"What Are Little Girls Made Of?" is the seventh episode of the first season of the American science fiction television series, Star Trek. Written by Robert Bloch and directed by James Goldstone, it first aired on October 20, 1966.

In the episode, Nurse Chapel searches for her long lost fiancé and uncovers his secret plan to create sophisticated androids for galactic conquest.

The first episode of the series to be repeated on NBC, the title of the episode is taken from the fourth line of the 19th-century nursery rhyme, "What Are Little Boys Made Of?"

== Plot ==
The USS Enterprise, under the command of Captain Kirk, travels to the icy planet Exo-III to search for the exobiologist Dr. Roger Korby. Korby was the fiancé of Dr. McCoy's temporary assistant, Nurse Christine Chapel, who signed on to the Enterprise to search for Korby.

At Korby's request, Kirk and Chapel beam down alone to a cavern entrance, but Korby is not there to meet them. Finding this suspicious, Kirk has two security officers, Rayburn and Mathews, beamed down from the Enterprise. Rayburn is instructed to stay at the entrance and keep a lookout, while Mathews accompanies Kirk and Chapel. The three descend into a system of caves. When passing over a deep chasm, Mathews apparently slips and falls to his death. Shortly after, they meet Korby's aide Dr. Brown. Chapel recognizes him but is surprised he does not remember her. Brown assures them that Mathews fell by accident, and the three continue on. Kirk contacts Rayburn and tells him to contact the Enterprise for reinforcements, but a strange creature kills Rayburn before he is able to contact the ship. Meanwhile, Kirk, Chapel and Brown find Korby, who tells them that the caves were left by an extinct race. Korby shows Kirk and Chapel machinery that creates androids. With the help of Ruk, a still-functioning android from the time of the original inhabitants, Korby has created more androids, one being a beautiful woman he has named Andrea. Brown is also an android. It is also revealed that Ruk had killed Rayburn and Mathews.

Korby creates an android duplicate of Kirk as Chapel looks on. As Kirk's personality is imprinted on the android, the real Kirk imagines himself insulting Spock as a "half-breed". Korby has the duplicate Kirk beamed aboard the Enterprise with orders to identify a planet suitable for creating more androids. When Spock questions the Kirk-android's orders, it repeats the insult Kirk had used. Spock, realizing that this is not Kirk, forms a security team to follow the Kirk-android back down to Exo-III. Andrea encounters the Kirk-android when it returns to the planet, and thinking it is the real Kirk, destroys him when he refuses to kiss her.

The real Kirk convinces Ruk that Korby is a threat to his existence. Ruk begins to recall the clash between the "Old Ones" and the androids that led to his civilization's demise centuries ago. Korby enters, and Ruk confronts him, but Korby destroys Ruk with a phaser. Shortly afterward, in a struggle with Kirk, the skin of Korby's hand is torn, revealing that he, too, is an android.

It is now revealed that Korby, dying of frostbite, had transferred his mind to an android body. He begs Chapel to believe that he is still the same man, but Chapel is repelled by what he has done to himself. Andrea, realizing she loves Korby, kisses him, and in despair, Korby fires Andrea's weapon between the embracing pair, destroying them both.

Spock arrives with the security force, but finds that the crisis has passed. When Spock inquires about Dr. Korby's whereabouts, Kirk replies, "Dr. Korby ... was never here." Chapel decides to stay on with the Enterprise and finish out her tour of duty. Spock tells Kirk about his dismay of using the term "half-breed" to warn that something was wrong. The captain says he will remember this should he find himself in a "similar situation."

== Production ==
The episode was written by Robert Bloch, but received rewrites during shooting by Gene Roddenberry. James Goldstone, the director of the series' second pilot "Where No Man Has Gone Before", was hired to direct this episode, but due to problems with the script, shooting went two days over schedule and Goldstone was not re-hired.

Sherry Jackson, who plays the android woman Andrea, said that they had a censor on set to make sure that her costume fully covered her breasts and that side cleavage was not visible. She also said of William Shatner, "I must say when he kissed me on screen, he really kissed me!" and that Shatner's chest had to be shaved for his nude scenes in the android machine because Gene Roddenberry felt that Captain Kirk would not be hairy.

Reference to the works of H. P. Lovecraft was briefly made in Bloch's script, with its mention of "the Old Ones" and the look of the trapezoidal doors in the caverns.

== Reception ==
Zack Handlen of The A.V. Club gave the episode a "B+" rating, noting that the "repetitive plotting" took away any real sense of threat and that without Spock or McCoy to play off, Kirk's character is less interesting.

== See also ==
- Ship of Theseus
- "Allegiance" (Star Trek: The Next Generation)
- Redshirt (stock character)
- "Whispers" (Star Trek: Deep Space Nine)
