= Budd Albright =

- Born: Forrest Edwards Albright; August 18, 1936 (age 90); Elkhart, Indiana, United States
- Genres: Rock n Roll
- Occupations: Singer, actor, stuntman, action coordinator, writer, sportsman
- Years active: 1961–1974
- Label: RCA Victor
- Website: www.buddalbright.com

Budd Albright (born August 18, 1936) is an American actor, singer, stunt man, and sportsman.

== Early years ==
Budd Albright was born Forrest Edwards Albright in Elkhart, Indiana of Dutch-Irish and Italian parents. His father, Forrest (Buzz) Albright, was an athlete who played professional baseball for the St. Louis Cardinals organization and was inducted into the Elkhart County Sports Hall of Fame for his prowess in baseball, basketball and track. He went on to play basketball for the Pittsburgh Panthers. His mother (Margaret) Jeanne Rutter was a would be actress who met Budd's father after a local theater performance.

When Budd was born in 1936 the young family moved to Los Angeles. Budd had two younger brothers Brian and Tom (both deceased). Times were tough and they lived in a small apartment on Melrose Avenue that overlooked the back lot of Paramount Studios. Budd's parents worked hard and Budd spent a lot of time with his grandmother Viola, who had been General Douglas MacArthur's personal secretary and had graduated from the Chicago Art Institute. She exposed Budd to films, museums and upscale restaurants of the day. The War took the family back to Cleveland, Ohio where his father worked for Republic Aviation building the P-47 Thunderbolt fighter plane.

At the end of the war the family moved back to Southern California and settled in Long Beach where Budd attended David Starr Jordan High School and hung out with the late Bob Denver. They both were kicked out of acting class for horsing around. In 1953 his family returned to Cleveland and Budd attended Willoughby Union High School for two years. One night, after watching The Wild One with Marlon Brando in a Cleveland movie theater, Budd decided to get out of the cold and return to Southern California to give movies a try.

In 1955 Budd returned to LA, parked cars in Beverly Hills, pumped gas in Pacific Palisades and joined Richard Boone's acting class on a tip from actor Billy Gray. His roommate at the time was another struggling actor Doug McClure.

== Career ==
=== Music ===
In 1958, Budd landed a recording contract with RCA Victor. He recorded the Rockabilly songs: "Adrienne" and "Got No Sunshine in My Soul".

Budd, along with actor and recording artist Steve Rowland and sax player Chuck Rio formed the Hollywood band "The Exciters." They played all the hot spots around the Sunset Strip and LA club circuit. On at least one occasion, their band created near havoc while playing at the Encore Club when the police and fire department were called out to arrest couples twisting in the street.

=== Acting ===
Budd Albright began his acting career in 1961, with a small part in the Warner's film Lad: A Dog. In 1962, Budd appeared in five episodes of the television series "The Lively Ones," a musical variety show hosted by Vic Damone. For the next few years, Budd played bit parts in various television series, including a bad guy in McCloud, a gang leader in The Outcasts, and an officer in The Reluctant Astronaut. He was even the Belair Cigarette Man on TV commercials and magazine ads for a few years.

In 1964 Budd was contacted by friend James Drury, who is best known for his title role in The Virginian. Drury told Budd that Clu Gulager was producing Bye Bye Birdie for summer stock in North Carolina and Budd got the part of Conrad Birdie, one of the leads.

In 1966, he appeared in two episodes during the first season of Star Trek as an actor and was killed off in both shows: as Security Guard Rayburn in What Are Little Girls Made Of?, which was directed by James Goldstone and written by Robert Bloch and Gene Roddenberry and as Barnhart the navigator in The Man Trap, which was directed by Marc Daniels and written by George Clayton Johnson and Gene Roddenberry.

=== Stunt man ===
The early 1960s produced a flourish of war films that were perfect for young, up and coming stuntmen. Budd spent a year living with the late Peter Breck, who starred in The Big Valley and his wife Diane in the San Fernando Valley and would get together on weekends with friends Robert Fuller, James Stacy, Chuck Courtney, actor/stuntmen Jerry Summers and Ronnie Rondell riding dirt bikes and partying at Bob Fuller's house. It was Jerry Summers that convinced Budd to try his hand at stunt work. Budd stunt doubled Robert Vaughn, Robert Wagner, Warren Beatty and Chris George. He worked in What Did You Do in the War, Daddy?, Beau Geste, First to Fight, Tobruk, Ice Station Zebra and There Was a Crooked Man and was part of the original Rat Patrol Stunt Team.

By the late sixties and early seventies Universal Studios was bursting at the seams with action TV shows and films. Sometimes Budd worked two or three shows at once with parts that included action sequences. Budd logged 31 high falls during that time. He often did double duty as actor/stuntman or actor/stunt coordinator. He worked as both an actor and the Action Coordinator on the movies Drive Hard Drive Fast (1973) and The Lonely Profession (1969) for writer/director Douglas Heyes. From 1968 to 1971, Budd worked as a stunt man in all 76 episodes (and as an actor in five episodes) of the groundbreaking TV series, The Name of the Game. It was a pioneering wheel series of 90 minute episodes rotating around three main characters played by Tony Franciosa, Gene Barry, and Robert Stack. Other actors who appeared on some episodes during the series included Peter Falk, Robert Culp, Robert Wagner, Darren McGavin, Susan Saint James, Mark Miller, Ben Murphy, William Shatner, Vera Miles, Jack Klugman and Cliff Potts.

Budd has worked with Hall of Fame stuntmen Hal Needham, Ronnie Rondell, Glenn Wilder, Roger Creed and Bill Hickman who is remembered most for the landmark car chase alongside Steve McQueen in the 1968 film Bullitt.

== Personal life ==
Budd was briefly married to actress Sharon Lee. They were married on September 21, 1958, at Santa Catalina Island's Community Church, separated on June 21, 1959, and legally divorced on February 1, 1961. This was Budd's first marriage, but Sharon's fourth. She married her fifth husband shortly after the couple divorced.

Budd has always been active. He raced Go Karts with Paul Newman, Keenan Wynn and Steve Rowland. He has also raced sports cars and was an American Power Boat Association (APBA) Grand National Boat Racing Champion. He has enjoyed water skiing, despite narrowly escaping serious injury during a dangerous mishap at Hanson Dam in 1961. In his spare time, he races bicycles and acts as the team captain for the Rinaldi/To Be Healthy cycling team.

Budd left the acting/stunt business in 1974 and has since worked as a photo journalist with producer Gary Berwin. and has written 32 magazine articles. In 1994, he formed Strike Team Media, a TV-promotional advertising firm and is currently working on getting his screenplays Closest of Enemies, Sea Foam Green and a TV series idea HLS Coconut Grove into production.

Budd Albright resides in Palm Desert, California and enjoys traveling often.

== Filmography ==
=== As a stunt man ===
- 1974 Ironside (TV series) (stunts - 1 episode)

The Over-the-Hill Blues (1974) (stunts)

- 1973 Drive Hard, Drive Fast (TV movie) (stunt coordinator)
- 1973 McCloud (TV series) (stunts - 1 episode)

The Million Dollar Round Up (1973) (stunts)

- 1968-1971 The Name of the Game (TV series) (stunt performer - All 76 episodes)
- 1970 There Was a Crooked Man... (stunts - uncredited)
- 1970 It Takes a Thief (TV series) (stunts - 1 episode)

The Suzie Simone Caper (1970) (stunts)

- 1969 The Lonely Profession (TV movie) (stunt coordinator)
- 1968 Ice Station Zebra (stunts - uncredited)
- 1966-1968 The Rat Patrol (TV series) (stunts - All 58 episodes)
- 1967 Tobruk (stunts - uncredited)
- 1967 First to Fight (stunt performer)
- 1966 Beau Geste (stunts - uncredited)
- 1966 What Did You Do in the War, Daddy? (stunts - uncredited)

=== As an actor ===
- 1973 Drive Hard, Drive Fast (TV movie)

CIA Man & Chase Driver

- 1972 McCloud (TV series)

The Barefoot Stewardess Caper (1972) - Bad Guy

- 1968-1971 The Name of the Game (TV series) - Man

The Showdown (1971)
The Broken Puzzle (1971)
Beware of the Watchdog (1971)
Appointment in Palermo (1971)
The Savage Eye (1971)

- 1969 The Lonely Profession (TV movie) - Interviewed Waiter
- 1968 The Outcasts (TV series) - Gang Leader Tony

A Ride to Vengeance (1968)

- 1967 The Reluctant Astronaut - Officer (uncredited)
- 1966 Star Trek (TV series)

S1:E1,The Man Trap - Barnhart (uncredited)
S1:E7, What Are Little Girls Made Of? - Security Guard Rayburn

- 1962 The Lively Ones (TV series)

Vic Damone's Friend

- 1962 Lad: A Dog (movie) - Family friend
