= The Rat Patrol =

American action adventure television series (1966–1968)

- Created by: Tom Gries
- Starring: Christopher George; Gary Raymond; Lawrence P. Casey; Justin Tarr; Hans Gudegast
- Country of origin: United States
- No. of seasons: 2
- No. of episodes: 58 (list of episodes)

Production
- Running time: 30 minutes
- Production companies: Mirisch-Rich Television Productions; Tom Gries Productions Inc.; United Artists Television; MGM Television

Original release
- Network: ABC
- Release: September 12, 1966 – March 18, 1968

The Rat Patrol is an American action adventure television series that aired on ABC between 1966 and 1968. The show follows the exploits of four Allied soldiers – three Americans and one British – who are part of a long-range desert patrol group in the North African campaign during World War II. Their mission: "to attack, harass and wreak havoc on Field Marshal Rommel's vaunted Afrika Korps".

== Background ==
The show was inspired by and loosely modeled on David Stirling's British Special Air Service (SAS), which used modified Jeeps armed with machine guns as their transport through the treacherous desert terrain, and Popski's Private Army. The American military did not deploy deep-penetration commando units in sustained operations behind enemy lines in North Africa. The title of the program refers to the nicknames given to some of the British Commonwealth forces in the North African campaign (Rats of Tobruk, the primarily Australian defenders of the city of Tobruk or the British Desert Rats).

At the time of the original telecast, many British, Australian, and New Zealand viewers took offense at the majority of American characters on the program, resulting in the show's being pulled from the BBC after six episodes. In Australia, the show was quickly relegated to a Saturday afternoon timeslot, when most people were out. The main audience became children who did not know the history of World War II. (The series was later shown on British satellite television in the 1990s.) In addition, the opening episode presented the trio of American actors outnumbering the token British member, Sergeant Jack Moffitt.

While the premise for the show might have been the SAS, the show itself modeled parts of the movie The Desert Rats (1953). The 30-minute time constraint limited the show's storyline to a formulaic plot: a regular contest between the characters Troy, the American, and Dietrich, the German, mirroring "cowboys" and "Indians". The show first aired on 12 September 1966; its final season began 16 September 1967. Despite its many historical inconsistencies, the show achieved successful ratings at a time when military shows were in decline because of public disaffection with the Vietnam War.

=== Ratings ===
In its first US season, The Rat Patrol was an instant success, siphoning about a million viewers from The Lucy Show, placing it in the top 30 for the season and making a strong enough showing to be renewed for a second season. During the 1967–68 season, it faced competition in Rowan & Martin's Laugh-In and The Man from U.N.C.L.E, which were shown in the same time slot, bookended by The Monkees and The Danny Thomas Show. ABC's other night with 30-minute time slots, Thursday, was decidedly family-oriented: Batman, The Flying Nun, Bewitched, and That Girl. Although running only two seasons, The Rat Patrol remains a highly popular series to this day.

As of December 2024, the Heroes & Icons channel broadcasts the series as part of its Saturday night lineup. In 2025, it was dropped from the schedule in favor of The Unit.

== Cast ==
The four members of the Allied patrol were:

Sgt. Sam Troy	Christopher George	The unit's commander, Troy is an intuitive, resourceful, clever, and gritty-yet-compassionate leader who always wears an Australian Army slouch hat. His common tagline is "Let's shake it!", expressing the urgency to hurry or leave.
Sgt. Jack Moffitt	Gary Raymond	The British member of the unit. An expert on the desert and on the local Arab tribes which inhabit it, Moffitt speaks fluent German, Arabic, and French. Before the outbreak of war, he accompanied his father (a noted archaeologist) on multiple trips to the Sahara. Moffitt wears a black Royal Tank Regiment beret. In the pilot episode, he was from the Royal Scots Greys. Teamed with PFC Pettigrew.
Cpl. Mark T. Hitchcock	Lawrence P. Casey	Known as "Hitch", the college-man-turned-soldier often chews bubblegum and wears a red French kepi with gold trim similar to those worn by Zouave and artillery troops during the American Civil War. Occasionally shows his "ladies' man" side. His tagline is "Who was there: you or me?"
PFC. Tully Pettigrew	Justin Tarr	Called one of the Army's best wheelmen by Troy, Tully grew up in Kentucky and apparently gained his remarkable driving skills by running moonshine. He is the only member of the Patrol who wears an Army regulation steel helmet, thus he is the only member wearing a regulation uniform.

Notable enemies included:

Hauptmann (Captain) Hans Dietrich	Hans Gudegast	A dedicated and honorable German officer and the Patrol's main nemesis. By the end of the series, it becomes clear that Dietrich, although a cunning opponent, never stoops to the cruel methods of fellow Nazi officers. Gudegast later became famous as a soap opera star under the pseudonym Eric Braeden.

For four episodes during the second season, Justin Tarr was unavailable to play Tully, so he is not in the opening credits. Three different characters took turns rounding out the Patrol until Tully returned:

- Andy in episodes 18 and 22 (Mac McLaughlin)
- Peterson in episode 21 (Darwin Joston)
- Bo Randall in episode 24 (Bo Hopkins)

A Rat Patrol soldier named Cotter (played by Whitey Christy) is shown being hit by enemy fire and slumping over his machine gun during the opening action sequence of the pilot episode, "The Chase of Fire Raid". The resulting vacancy allowed for the addition of Moffitt to the team.

== Production ==
A total of fifty-eight 30-minute episodes were produced by Mirisch-Rich Television Productions (when Lee Rich left the partnership during the second season, the company name changed to Mirisch T.V. Inc.), a subsidiary of United Artists Television, in association with Tom Gries Productions Inc. (Tom Gries, Inc. in season two). Just as with The Man From U.N.C.L.E., in which episode titles included the word "Affair", all Rat Patrol episodes titles had "Raid" e.g. "The Do or Die Raid", "The Lighthouse Raid", or "Mask-A-Raid".

Part of the show's first season was filmed in Almería, Spain, with the rest in the United States.

The three-part story arc "The Last Harbor Raid" was released theatrically in some venues under the title "Massacre Harbor".

Christopher George suffered multiple injuries, including a heart contusion, and Gary Raymond suffered a broken ankle when a jeep, with the M2 Browning, overturned on them during filming of episode 27, "Take Me To Your Leader Raid", in January 1967. George's injury contributed to his 1983 death.

As was usual for productions of the era, authentic equipment was depicted by substitutes, though a number of the soft-skinned vehicles used by the Germans in the Spanish-filmed episodes are German or Italian Axis vehicles. The German armoured vehicles were actually American Patton tanks, M7 Priest self-propelled guns, and M3 Half-tracks painted in desert sand colors. In the US-filmed episodes, M35 2-1/2 ton cargo trucks replaced the more convincing vehicles used in Spain. Some of the US jeeps used by secondary characters are clearly post-war.

Perhaps the most-remembered visual was a jeep jumping over a sand dune, seen in the opening credits and other scenes in the series.

The submachine guns used by the squad were unusual. Because the first season had been filmed in Spain, the producers obtained several fixed wood-stock versions of the Spanish Star Z-45 (9x23mm Largo) submachine gun from the Spanish Army, in an apparent attempt to imitate the look of the WWII .45 Thompson submachine gun. This was changed in later first-season episodes when Thompsons were finally made available.

During the series, Sgt. Troy wore a bush hat typical of Australian troops. When the show aired in Australia, veterans of both World Wars there were critical of an American actor wearing such an important symbol of Australian courage and sacrifice. It was seen by some to cheapen and sensationalize the memory and spirit of those ANZACs who died fighting fascism. George, a U.S. Marine Korean War veteran, and of Greek extraction, said he insisted his character wear the slouch hat to honor the Australians who fought in Greece. Larry Casey stated in an interview that Tom Gries' original idea was that each of the characters would be from a different country and wear a different hat. However this was changed, and with Christopher George wishing to wear the slouch hat, his American helmet was given to Justin Tarr.

== Episode guide ==
The Rat Patrol appeared on television from 1966 to 1968. The 58 episodes are split up into two seasons; 1966-1967 (32 episodes) and 1967-1968 (26 episodes).

== Home media ==
MGM Home Entertainment has released both seasons of The Rat Patrol on DVD in Region 1. The First Season is also available on Region 2 DVD. On May 13, 2008, MGM released a seven-disc boxset of the complete series.

Shout! Factory acquired the rights to the series and re-released The Rat Patrol - The Complete Series on DVD in Region 1 on November 28, 2017.

DVD name	Ep #	Release date
The Complete First Season	32	January 31, 2006
The Complete Second Season	26	June 12, 2007
The Rat Patrol: The Complete Series	58	May 13, 2008; November 28, 2017 (re-release)

== Comic book ==
Dell Comics published a comic book series that lasted six issues (1967; one issue in 1969). These had photo covers taken from the television series.

== Books ==
- Five books were released by Paperback Library.
1. The Rat Patrol by Norman Daniels
2. The Rat Patrol #2 in Desert Danger, by David King
3. The Rat Patrol #3 in The Trojan Tank Affair, by David King
4. The Rat Patrol #4 in The Two Faced Enemy, by David King
5. The Rat Patrol #5 in Target For Tonight, by David King
6. The Rat Patrol #6 in Desert Masquerade, by David King
- One book released by Whitman
1. The Rat Patrol, The Iron Monster Raid, by I G Edmonds

A coloring book was issued by Saalfield, 1966, based on the series.

A series of trading cards were published in 1966 by Topps Chewing Gum for Mirisch-Rich Television Productions. A total set included 66 cards, with still shots from the series on the fronts and text about the stills on the back (as part of a full story about having to blow a buried fuel dump), along with parts of 9 different picture puzzles which could be assembled to show the main characters from the show: Troy, Moffitt, Tully, Hitchcock, Dietrich, as well as several other stills, including a shot of the four Rat Patrol members on one jeep.

== Soundtrack ==
Like The Fugitive, The Rat Patrol was one of the few primetime dramatic series of the era to use a library of music instead of having specific episodes scored. Dominic Frontiere, who replaced Alex North when he was fired during post-production of the pilot (along with series creator Tom Gries when the pilot went over-budget), wrote the series theme and music library, conducting the Graunke Symphony Orchestra. La-La Land Records issued a limited edition album of Frontiere's music in 2011, and a second volume in 2014 featuring more Frontiere music and North's unused score for the pilot. A number of tracks from the library were first composed and recorded by Frontiere as the director of music for the science fiction series The Outer Limits (1963 TV series), which ran from 1963 - 1965.

=== The Rat Patrol soundtrack album ===
1. The Rat Patrol Main Title 1:00
2. Another Day, Another Mission 1:11
3. Convoy 1:31
4. Desert Action 2:00
5. After That Man 1:15
6. Lost And Found 3:35
7. Desert Romance 2:49
8. Rats Sneak About 2:03
9. A Tight Spot 2:17
10. Do You Smell Something? 0:43
11. Time To Go 0:48
12. Night Maneuvers 3:02
13. Firefight 2:16
14. Desert Sun 0:29
15. Farewell/Ambushed 1:07
16. Burning Sun/Sniper 1:01
17. The Massacre 1:36
18. Germans On The Move 1:33
19. Rats On The Move 2:25
20. Breaking In And Searching 1:46
21. Rats On Patrol 1:25
22. Rats In Action 1:30
23. A Friend's Death 1:38
24. We Have A Job To Do! 1:15
25. Serious Discussion 2:22
26. Hand To Hand 1:14
27. Dirge 2:03
28. Rat Mission 1:47
29. Cat And Mouse 2:03
30. The Traitor 0:51
31. Tricked Into A Trap 0:26
32. Stalemate 1:47
33. Cut Off 0:34
34. Rats Have Some Fun 1:19
35. Floating Down 0:52
36. Foot Chase 1:13
37. Plans For Rats 1:15
38. In And Out Of Enemy Camp 1:53
39. We've Still Got A Job To Do 1:15
40. Planning The Attack 1:36
41. Getting Ready 5:10
42. Big Battle 2:58
43. Mission Accomplished 1:53
44. The Rat Patrol End Credits 1:37
45. Theme from The Rat Patrol 2:30

=== The Rat Patrol: Volume 2 ===
Tracks 21-28 comprise Alex North's unused score for "The Chase Of Fire Raid."

1. The Rat Patrol Overture 2:30
2. The Germans on the Move 1:51
3. Before the War 3:48
4. Our Man Hans/Rats on the Prowl 1:32
5. Belly Dancer Muzak 1:23
6. After the War 3:42
7. In and Out 1:23
8. Hans Checks for Rats/German Fall Out 1:41
9. That Tiny World (no strings) - vocal: Jack Jones 2:44
10. Quick Getaway From the Germans 1:32
11. Tank Column 1:56
12. In Love With a Rat 2:58
13. In and Out of Trouble 0:30
14. Lili Marlene - Norbert Schultze 1:54
15. Big Mean Germans 1:46
16. Here Comes Hans 0:45
17. The Showdown 1:40
18. Rats on Parade 2:01
19. Remembering an Old Friend 2:52
20. Rat Patrol Main Title (alt. take) 1:46
21. The Original Rat Patrol Theme 0:51
22. Our Heroes on Duty 0:36
23. Entering the Bar 0:27
24. Rat Chat 2:30
25. Honor and Duty 2:40
26. Germans Arrive/Let's Get Out of Here 1:14
27. Until Next Time/Finale 1:48
28. The Original Rat Patrol End Credits 0:55
29. Slow and Sexy Belly Dance 3:36
30. Fast Belly Dance 0:47
31. That Tiny World (record with strings) - vocal: Jack Jones 2:44
32. The Rat Patrol End Credits (Alt. Take) 0:38

== Toys ==
Marx Toys produced a Rat Patrol set consisting of a Jeep with Troy and Moffitt action figures that resembled George and Raymond.

Aurora model company made a 1/87 scale model Rat Patrol diorama in 1967.

Hasbro created a GI JOE FIGURE, and the Desert Patrol Jeep, which were based on the TV Show.

== Other cultural references ==
Punk rock band Naked Raygun led off their album Throb Throb with a song called "Rat Patrol"—the lyrics of which clearly refer to the show.

The 2012 novel by Elizabeth Bevarly, The House on Butterfly Way, includes a vignette about the metal lunchbox produced by Aladdin during the show's original run. The passage refers to George and Sam Troy's hat, as well as Braeden and his character, Dietrich.

A version of The Clash album Combat Rock, mixed by guitarist Mick Jones, was released under the title Rat Patrol from Fort Bragg.
