= The Mod Squad =

American crime drama series (1968–1973)

- Title screen, 1970 to 1973
- Genre: Action; Crime drama
- Created by: Bud "Buddy" Ruskin
- Developed by: Tony Barrett; Harve Bennett; Sammy Hess
- Starring: Michael Cole; Clarence Williams III; Peggy Lipton; Tige Andrews
- Theme music composer: Earle Hagen
- Country of origin: United States
- Original language: English
- No. of seasons: 5
- No. of episodes: 124 (list of episodes)

Production
- Executive producers: Aaron Spelling; Danny Thomas
- Running time: 60 minutes
- Production company: Thomas-Spelling Productions

Original release
- Network: ABC
- Release: September 24, 1968 – March 1, 1973

The Mod Squad is an American crime drama series, originally broadcast for five seasons on ABC from September 24, 1968, to March 1, 1973. It starred Michael Cole as Peter "Pete" Cochran, Clarence Williams III as Lincoln "Linc" Hayes, Peggy Lipton as Julie Barnes, and Tige Andrews as Captain Adam Greer. The executive producers of the series were Aaron Spelling and Danny Thomas.

The counterculture police series earned six Emmy Award nominations, four Golden Globe nominations plus one win for Peggy Lipton, one Directors Guild of America Award, and four Logies. In 1970, the second-season episode, "In This Corner . . . Sol Alpert," script by Rita Lakin and Harve Bennett, was nominated by the Mystery Writers of America for an Edgar Award in the category of Best Mystery Teleplay, losing to the TV-Movie Daughter of the Mind. In 1997, a 1970 episode "Mother of Sorrow" was ranked No. 95 on TV Guide's 100 Greatest Episodes of All Time.

== Plot ==
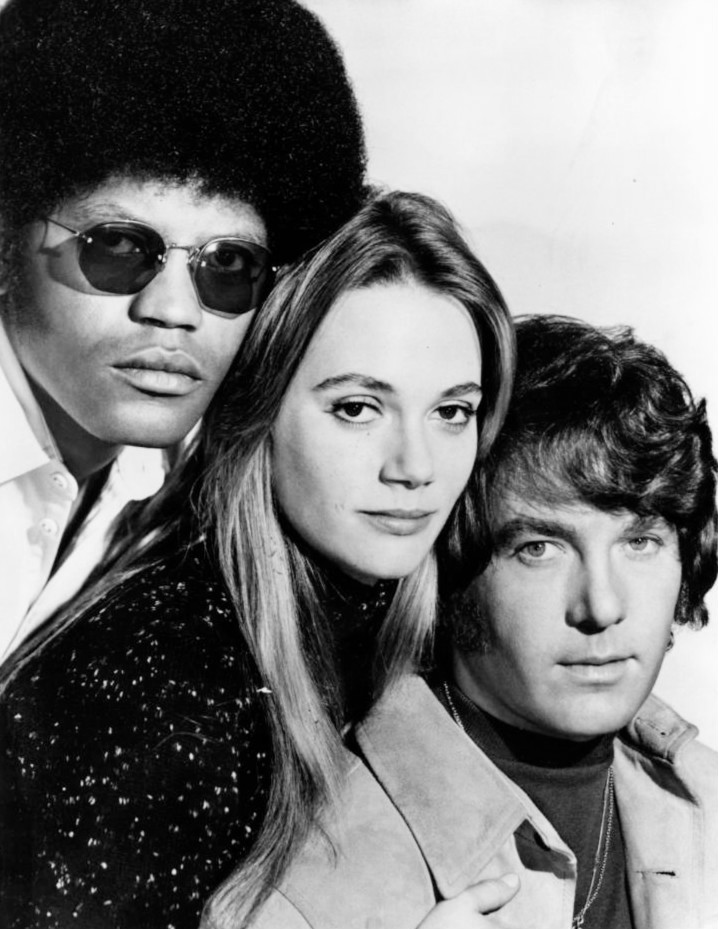
The main cast in 1971 from left: Clarence Williams III, Peggy Lipton and Michael Cole

A critic described The Mod Squad as "the hippest and first young undercover cops on TV". Each of these characters represented mainstream culture's principal fears regarding youth in the era: long-haired rebel Pete Cochran (Michael Cole) was evicted from his wealthy parents' Beverly Hills home, then arrested and put on probation after he stole a car; Lincoln Hayes (Clarence Williams III), who came from a family of 13 children, was arrested in the Watts riots, one of the longest and most violent riots in Los Angeles history; flower child Julie Barnes (Peggy Lipton), the "canary with a broken wing," was arrested for vagrancy after running away from her prostitute mother's San Francisco home; and Captain Adam Greer (Tige Andrews) was a tough but sympathetic mentor and father figure who convinced them to form the squad.

The concept was to take three rebellious, disaffected young social outcasts and convince them to work as unarmed undercover detectives as an alternative to being incarcerated. Their youthful, hippie personas would enable them to get close to the criminals they would investigate. "The times are changing," Captain Greer explained. "They can get into places we (the regular police) can't." Examples included their infiltrations of a high school to solve a teacher's murder, of an underground newspaper to find a bomber, and of an acting class to look for a strangler who was preying on blonde actresses.

More than a year before the release of the film Easy Rider, The Mod Squad was one of the earliest attempts to deal with the counterculture. The show also dealt with issues such as abortion, domestic violence, child abuse, illiteracy, slumlords, the anti-war movement, illegal immigration, police brutality, student protest, sex education, soldiers returning from Vietnam and PTSD, racism, euthanasia, and the illegal drug trade. Spelling intended the show to be about the characters' relationships, and he promised that the Squad "would never arrest kids ... or carry a gun or use one."

The show was loosely based on creator Bud "Buddy" Ruskin's experiences in the late 1950s as a squad leader for young undercover narcotics cops, though it took almost 10 years after he wrote a script for the idea to be green-lighted by ABC Television Studios.

== Impact ==
The shows Hogan's Heroes (1965–71), Star Trek (1966–69), I Spy (1965–68), The Bill Cosby Show (1969–71), Room 222 (1969–74), Mannix (1967–75), Mission: Impossible (1966–73), Julia (1968–71), The Flip Wilson Show (1970–74), and The Mod Squad (1968–73) were among the first programs to feature African-Americans as stars since the stereotyped roles of Amos 'n' Andy and Beulah (ABC, 1950–53). Significantly, The Mod Squad presented an African-American character (Linc) as being on an equal footing, as roles went, to the Caucasian characters (Pete and Julie). In one Mod Squad episode, the script called for Linc to give Julie a "friendly kiss". Since the first interracial kiss on an American television show was in 1968, this was still fairly new territory in popular culture. The studio was frightened of a negative public reaction, so they asked Spelling to cut it:

"You can't do that," I was told. "You can't have a black man kissing a white girl." I won and ABC agreed to let it in, but they warned me I'd receive thousands of complaint letters. I didn't get one.

Linc's famous "solid" and "keep the faith" were among the current-day slang used on the show, which included "pad", "dig it", and "groovy."

The "kids" traveled in Pete's old station wagon, "Woody": a green woodie-style 1950 Mercury Eight which became famous until it burned up in a fire after going over a cliff during a chase at the end of the second-season episode "The Death of Wild Bill Hannachek".

Among the series' guest stars were Desi Arnaz Jr., Ed Asner (three episodes in three different roles), René Auberjonois, Jim Backus, Joe Don Baker, Tom Bosley, Victor Buono, David Cassidy, Jack Cassidy, Tyne Daly (two episodes in two different roles), Sammy Davis Jr. (three episodes in three different roles), Tony Dow, Richard Dreyfuss (two episodes in two different roles), Sam Elliott, Harrison Ford (uncredited role), Meg Foster (two episodes in two different roles), Anthony Geary, Louis Gossett Jr., Lee Grant, Andy Griffith, Clint Howard, Rodolfo Hoyos Jr. (three episodes in three different roles), Spelling's ex-wife Carolyn Jones, Fernando Lamas, Cleavon Little, Barbara McNair, Leslie Nielsen, Stefanie Powers, Vincent Price, Richard Pryor, Robert Reed, Sugar Ray Robinson, Cesar Romero, Marion Ross, Martin Sheen, Bobby Sherman (two episodes in two different roles), Vic Tayback, Danny Thomas (as well as being co-executive producer of the show), Daniel J. Travanti (three episodes in three different roles), Jo Van Fleet, Fritz Weaver, Billy Dee Williams and William Windom.

== Episodes ==
Season	Episodes	Originally released	
Season	Episodes	First released	Last released
1	26	September 24, 1968	April 15, 1969
2	26	September 23, 1969	April 7, 1970
3	24	September 22, 1970	March 23, 1971
4	24	September 14, 1971	March 7, 1972
5	24	September 14, 1972	March 1, 1973
Television film		May 18, 1979	

== Broadcast history and Nielsen ratings ==
Season	Time	Rank	Rating
1 (1968–69)	Tuesday at 7:30-8:30 pm	No. 28	20.5 (tied with The Lawrence Welk Show)
2 (1969–70)	Tuesday at 7:30-8:30 pm	No. 23	20.8
3 (1970–71)	Tuesday at 7:30-8:30 pm	No. 11	22.7
4 (1971–72)	Tuesday at 7:30-8:30 pm	No. 21	21.5
5 (1972–73)	Thursday at 8:00-9:00 pm	#54	16.5

== Syndication ==
In the United States, MeTV reran the series from May 26 to August 29, 2014, and again on Sunday afternoons from January 4 to August 30, 2015. Decades re-ran part of the series on February 24–25, 2018, and again on January 30–31, 2021, for their binge weekend programming block; they presented one final Decades Binge of it on March 25–26, 2023 before the network changed into Catchy Comedy. Mod Squad is currently airing on MeTV+ weekdays at 2 pm ET.

== Related productions ==
A television pilot was shot in 1968, with a running time of 74 minutes, but it was never aired in its entirety. The film was edited to 50 minutes and aired as the show's first episode. The uncut 74-minute version appears on the DVD set as the opening episode, with the title "The Teeth of the Barracuda."

A TV reunion movie, The Return of the Mod Squad, was transmitted on ABC on May 18, 1979, featuring the entire original cast. Tom Bosley, a guest star during the original run, also participated as an antagonist targeting Julie Barnes herself. Peggy Lipton said she participated in it as a favor to Aaron Spelling.

In 1999, the series was adapted into a feature film with the same title by MGM; however, this film, which starred Giovanni Ribisi, Omar Epps, Claire Danes, and Dennis Farina in Cole's, Williams III's, Lipton's, and Andrews's roles respectively, was not a box-office success.

== Home media ==
CBS DVD (distributed by Paramount) has released the first two seasons of The Mod Squad on DVD in Region 1.

On August 20, 2013, it was announced that Visual Entertainment had acquired the rights to the series (under license from Paramount) and would release season 3 on DVD on September 24, 2013. Season 4 would be released on October 1, 2013. In Canada, Season 3 was released on DVD a week earlier, on September 17, 2013, and Season 4 was released on October 8, 2013. Season 5 was released in Canada on November 19, 2013, and in the US on December 17, 2013. A Complete Series set was released in Canada and the US on November 12, 2013.

DVD name	Ep #	Release date
Season 1, Volume 1	13	December 18, 2007 (US & Canada)
Season 1, Volume 2	13	March 11, 2008 (US & Canada)
Season 2, Volume 1	13	November 25, 2008 (US & Canada)
Season 2, Volume 2	13	May 26, 2009 (US & Canada)
Season 3, Volume 1	12	September 24, 2013 (US) September 17, 2013 (Canada)
Season 3, Volume 2	12	September 24, 2013 (US) September 17, 2013 (Canada)
Season 4, Volume 1	12	October 1, 2013 (US) October 8, 2013 (Canada)
Season 4, Volume 2	12	October 1, 2013 (US) October 8, 2013 (Canada)
Season 5, Volume 1	12	December 17, 2013 (US) November 19, 2013 (Canada)
Season 5, Volume 2	12	December 17, 2013 (US) November 19, 2013 (Canada)
Complete Series	124	November 12, 2013 (US & Canada)

== References elsewhere in popular culture ==
The term "Mod Squad" had been introduced the previous year in Dragnet 1967's sixteenth installment, "The Big Kids," where it described a club of high schoolers who had to shoplift at least $20 to become members.

In 1990 on the TV series Twin Peaks, in which Lipton was a regular, Williams appeared in two episodes. The pair shared a brief scene that appears to have been an intentional reunion.
