= Susan Saint James =

American actress (1946–2026)

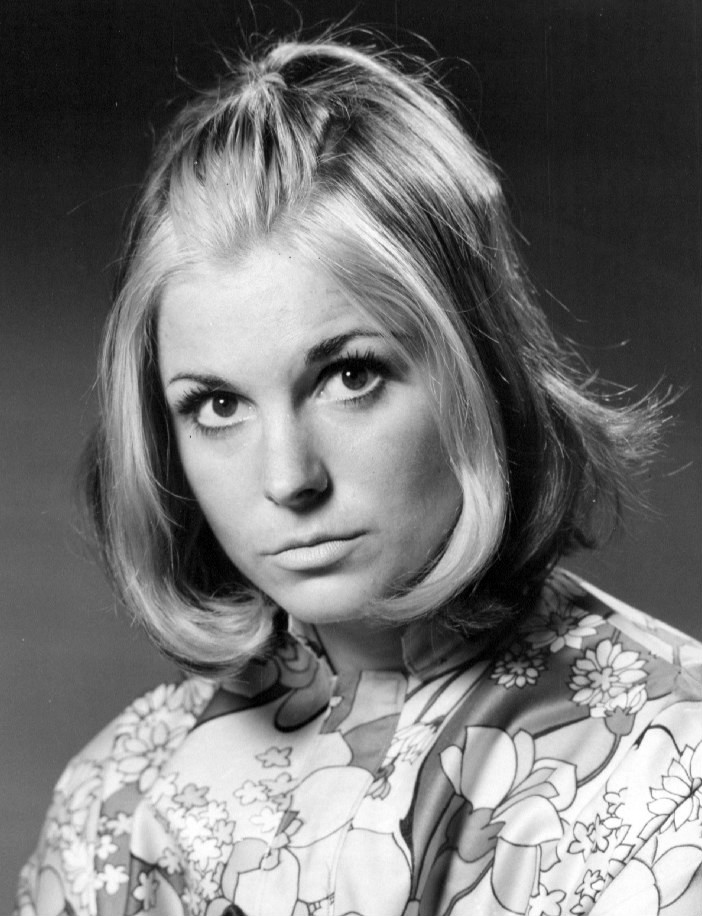
- Saint James in 1970
- Born: Susan Jane Miller; August 14, 1946; Los Angeles, California, U.S.
- Died: October 26, 2026 (aged 80); Los Angeles, California, U.S.
- Occupation: Actress
- Years active: 1966–2022
- Spouses: Richard Neubert (m. 1967; div. 1968) Tom Lucas (m. 1971; div. 1977) Dick Ebersol (m. 1981)
- Children: 5, including Charlie Ebersol
- Relatives: Christa Miller (niece)

Susan Saint James (born Susan Jane Miller; August 14, 1946 – October 26, 2026) was an American actress. In 1968, she landed a role as Peggy Maxwell on the TV series The Name of the Game. Saint James received three Emmy Award nominations for the series, winning once in 1969. She is also known for her appearances as Sally McMillan in the television detective series McMillan & Wife (1971–1976), for which she received three Emmy nominations and a Golden Globe Award for Best Actress – Television Series Drama nomination, and as Kate McArdle in the sitcom Kate & Allie (1984–1989), which garnered her Primetime Emmy Award for Outstanding Lead Actress in a Comedy Series nominations in 1984 and 1985. In 1979, she was nominated for a Saturn Award for Best Actress for her role as Cindy Sondheim in the comedy film Love at First Bite.

== Early life ==
Saint James was born Susan Jane Miller on August 14, 1946, in Los Angeles, one of four children of Constance (née Geiger), a teacher, and Charles Daniel Miller, who worked for Mitchell Camera and later became the president of the Testor Corporation. Saint James was raised in Rockford, Illinois, where she began modeling as a teenager. In her younger school years she attended the Woodlands Academy of the Sacred Heart in Lake Forest, Illinois. She later attended Connecticut College. She changed her surname to Saint James at age 20 when she pursued an acting career.

== Career ==
Saint James's first screen role was in the TV movie Fame Is the Name of the Game (1966) with Tony Franciosa, launching her career when it became a series two years later. Among her other early television appearances were two episodes of the first season of Ironside ("Girl in the Night", which aired in December 1967, and two months later, "Something for Nothing", as a different character). She also had a supporting role in the 1968 film Where Angels Go, Trouble Follows, the sequel to The Trouble with Angels.

From 1968 to 1971, as a result of her first role in Fame Is the Name of the Game, Saint James had a regular part in the series The Name of the Game, winning an Emmy Award for her role as research assistant Peggy Maxwell in 1969 and establishing her as a popular young actress. The series format, set at a large media company, featured rotating lead characters played by Tony Franciosa, Gene Barry, and Robert Stack; generally only one of their characters was seen each week. Saint James provided a measure of series continuity by appearing as a research assistant at various times to all three. She appeared in approximately half the episodes, usually in a supporting role, although Peggy Maxwell was the primary character in the second-season episode "The King of Denmark", alongside Franciosa's character Jeff Dillon. Saint James was also prominently featured in the first-season story "Pineapple Rose" (a Gene Barry segment), when her character was kidnapped in a case of mistaken identity.

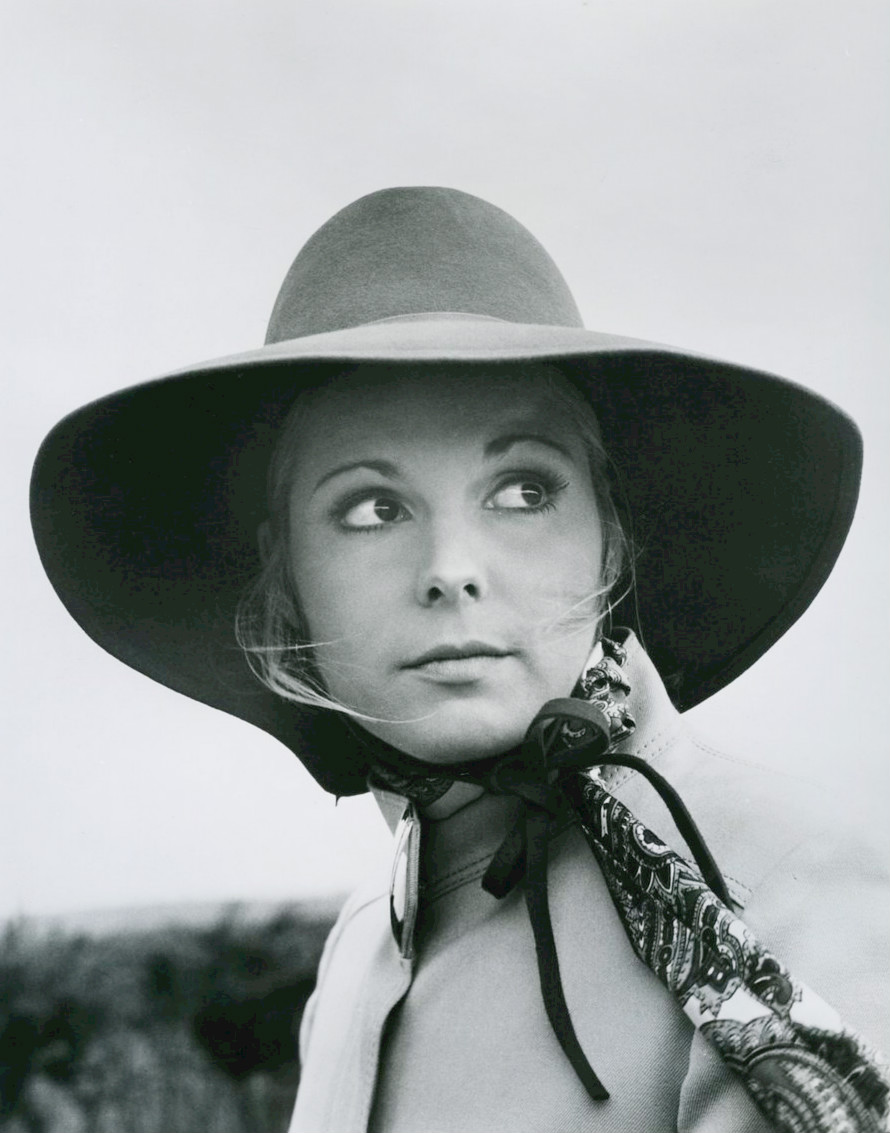
Saint James as Peggy Maxwell in the television series The Name of the Game, 1969

In 1967, Saint James had a small part in the pilot episode of the crime-caper series It Takes a Thief, starring Robert Wagner. This led to a recurring role playing a new character, Charlene "Chuck" Brown, Alexander Mundy's fellow thief and casual love interest. She was featured in four episodes of the series from 1968 to 1970. She went on to appear in the pilot episode of the 1971 western series Alias Smith and Jones.

Then came her first starring role as Rock Hudson's younger supportive wife, Sally McMillan, in the popular lighthearted crime series McMillan & Wife (1971–1976), for which she received four Emmy Award nominations. She left the show due to a contract dispute but went on to further her career as an actress in feature films, such as co-starring with Peter Fonda in the film Outlaw Blues (1977). She achieved significant success co- starring with George Hamilton in the vampire comedy Love at First Bite (1979) and followed up with a role in the comedy How to Beat the High Cost of Living (1980), co-starring Jessica Lange and Jane Curtin. Between films, she made a guest appearance in the March 3, 1980, episode of M*A*S*H (episode 196: "War Co-Respondent"). After other film ventures failed to establish her in cinema, she returned to television, starring in the comedy series Kate & Allie opposite Jane Curtin from 1984 until 1989. She received two more Emmy Award nominations for this role. In her mid-40s, she retired after Kate & Allie ended.

Saint James was also a celebrity guest commentator for the World Wrestling Federation's WrestleMania 2 event in 1986 along with Vince McMahon.

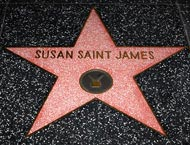
Saint James' Hollywood Walk of Fame star

== Post-acting ==
In addition to motherhood (her second-youngest son was born during the fourth season of Kate & Allie), she was an active volunteer with the Special Olympics (an organization she began actively supporting in 1972). She served on the Special Olympics board, and represented Civitan International for the Special Olympics as their celebrity chairperson. She was a board member of the Telluride Foundation.

In 1998, she, her sister (Mary Mercedes Dewey), and a friend, Barrie Johnson, founded Seedling and Pip, a baby gift basket business. Saint James owned WZBG Radio in Litchfield, Connecticut, with iHeart Radio Chairman Bob Pittman. She went back to school in her 50s to become a master gardener.

She occasionally emerged from retirement to appear in television series guest roles, such as the mother of (her real-life niece) Christa Miller in the first season of The Drew Carey Show, and ten years later, as a defense attorney on the February 28, 2006, episode of Law & Order: Special Victims Unit. She starred in a 1999 production of The Miracle Worker at the Warner Theatre in Torrington, Connecticut. On June 11, 2008, Saint James was honored with a star on the Hollywood Walk of Fame.

== Personal life and death ==
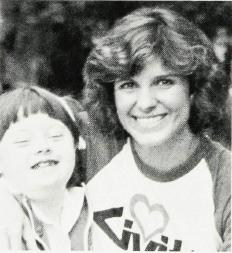
Saint James in a Civitan International public service announcement in 1986

Saint James married aspiring writer-director Richard Neubert in 1967, but the marriage lasted only a year. She was married a second time in 1971, to Thomas Lucas, a makeup artist. They had a daughter, Sunshine Lucas (born 1972), and a son, Harmony Lucas (born 1974). They divorced in 1977.

While guest-hosting Saturday Night Live in 1981, Saint James met the show's executive producer Dick Ebersol. They married within the year and had three sons: Charles, Willie and Edward "Teddy" Ebersol. In March 2002, Saint James filed for divorce from Ebersol, but the couple reconciled later that summer.

On November 28, 2004, a private plane carrying Dick, Charles, and Teddy crashed during an attempted takeoff from Montrose Regional Airport in Colorado. Dick and son Charles survived, but their son Teddy, aged 14, died, as did pilot Luis Alberto Polanco Espaillet and flight attendant Warren T. Richardson III.

She was a vegetarian.

Saint James held honorary degrees from six Connecticut institutions: the University of Connecticut, the University of Bridgeport, Southern Connecticut State University, Albertus Magnus College, the University of New Haven, and Goodwin University. She was a featured speaker at The Women's Conference in 2007, at a session called "Beyond Courage: Overcoming the Unimaginable".

Saint James died from pancreatic cancer at a hospital in Los Angeles on October 26, 2026, at the age of 80.

== Filmography ==
=== Feature films ===
Year	Film	Role	Notes
1968	P.J.	Linette Orbison	
1968	Where Angels Go, Trouble Follows	Rosabelle	
1968	What's So Bad About Feeling Good?	Aida	
1968	Jigsaw	Ida	
1970	The Cockeyed Cowboys of Calico County	Mrs. Martha Kid	
1977	Outlaw Blues	Tina Waters	
1979	Love at First Bite	Cindy Sondheim	Nominated—Saturn Award for Best Actress
1980	How to Beat the High Cost of Living	Jane	
1981	Carbon Copy	Vivian Whitney	
1982	Don't Cry, It's Only Thunder	Katherine Cross	

=== Television films ===
Year	Film	Role	Notes
1966	Fame Is the Name of the Game	Peggy Chan	
1972	Magic Carpet	Timothea Lamb	
1976	Scott Free	Holly	
1978	Night Cries	Jeannie Haskins	
1978	Desperate Women	Esther Winters	
1979	The Girls in the Office	Rita Massaro	
1979	Sex and the Single Parent	Sally	
1979	S.O.S. Titanic	Leigh Goodwin	
1982	The Kid from Nowhere	Samantha "Sam" Kandal	
1983	I Take These Men	Carol Sherwood	
1983	After George	Susan Roberts	
2019	Holiday Hearts	Woman	

=== Television series ===
Year	Film	Role	Notes
1967–1968	Ironside	Elaine Moreau / Verna Cusack	2 episodes
1968–1970	It Takes a Thief	Anne Edwards / Charlene "Charlie" Brown	5 episodes
1968–1971	The Name of the Game	Peggy Maxwell	36 episodes Primetime Emmy Award for Outstanding Supporting Actress in a Drama Series; Nominated—Primetime Emmy Award for Outstanding Supporting Actress in a Drama Series (1970–71)
1970	McCloud	Officer Keach	Episode: "Walk in the Dark"
1971	Alias Smith and Jones	Miss Porter	Episode: "Alias Smith and Jones"
1971–1976	McMillan & Wife	Sally McMillan	34 episodes Nominated—Golden Globe Award for Best Actress – Television Series Drama (1972–74); Nominated—Primetime Emmy Award for Outstanding Lead Actress in a Drama Series (1972–73); Nominated—Primetime Emmy Award for Outstanding Lead Actress in a Limited Series or Movie
1974	Ready and Willing	Julia Preston	Unsold CBS pilot
1980	M*A*S*H	Aggie O'Shea	Episode: "War Co-Respondent"
1981–1983	Saturday Night Live	Herself	4 episodes
1984–1989	Kate & Allie	Katherine "Kate" McArdle	122 episodes Nominated—Primetime Emmy Award for Outstanding Lead Actress in a Comedy Series (1983–84)
1989	Tattingers	Susan	Episode: "Broken Windows"
1996	The Drew Carey Show	Lynn O'Brien	Episode: "Drew and Kate and Kate's Mom"
2006	Law & Order: Special Victims Unit	Monica Bradshaw	Episode: "Gone"
2011	Suits	Joy McAfferty	Episode: "Bail Out"
2020	The Haunting of Bly Manor	Relative #2	Episode: "The Way It Came"
2020–2022	Upload	Old Woman	Final role; 3 episodes
