= June Harding =

American actress (1937–2019)

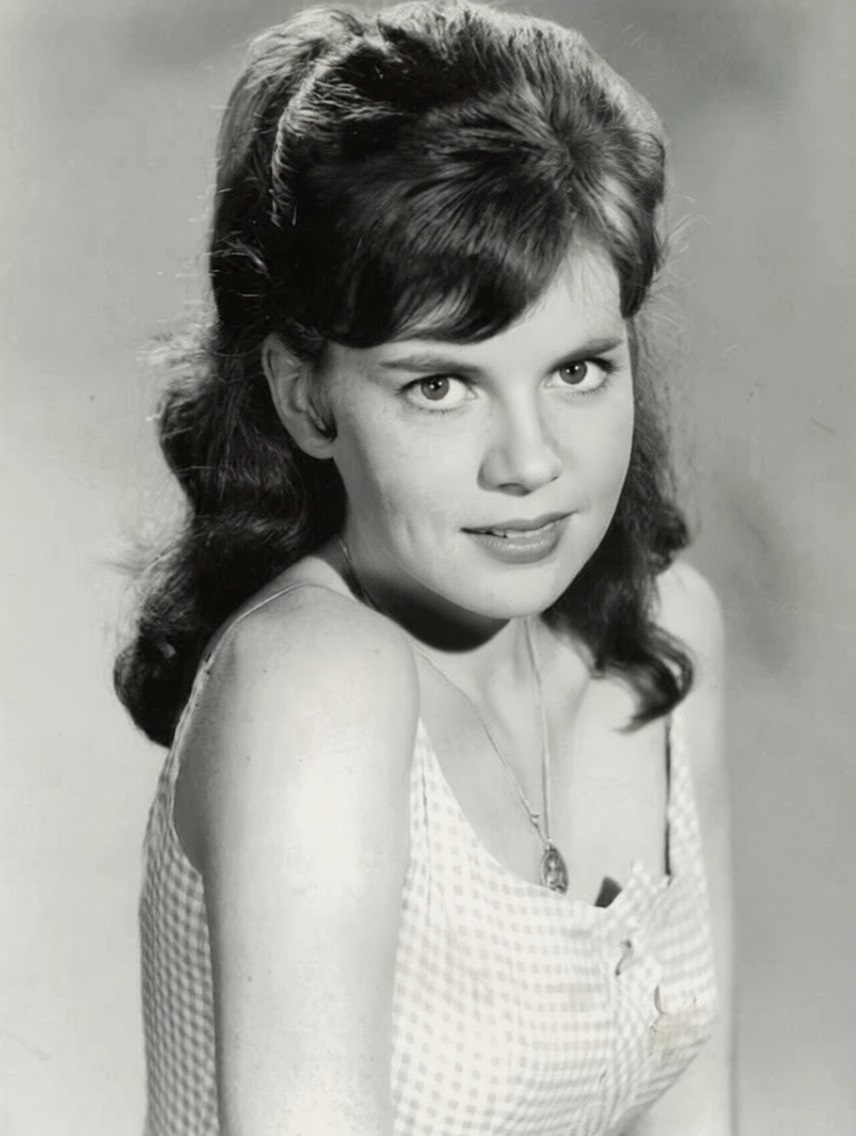
- Harding in 1963
- Born: June Allison Harding; September 7, 1937; Emporia, Virginia, U.S.
- Died: March 22, 2019 (aged 81); Deer Isle, Maine, U.S.
- Education: Richmond Professional Institute
- Occupation: Actress
- Years active: 1962–1970
- Spouse: Gary Thomas
- Awards: Theatre World Award (1960–1961)

June Harding (September 7, 1937 – March 22, 2019) was an American actress who appeared in several 1960s TV shows. She is best remembered for her role opposite Hayley Mills and Rosalind Russell in the 1966 film The Trouble with Angels. Like Mills, Harding did not appear in the film's sequel, Where Angels Go, Trouble Follows.

== Early years ==
Harding was born in Emporia, Virginia, and graduated from Greensville County High School in 1955. She earned a bachelor's in acting from Richmond Professional Institute.

After graduation, she went to New York. She studied acting under Lonny Chapman at The Theater Studio of New York. She took ballet and practiced yoga.

== Career ==
In the summer of 1961, Harding acted in a stock company at the Cecilwood Theater in Fishkill, New York.

In New York, she landed a recurring role on the CBS soap opera As the World Turns. Harding appeared in the off-Broadway productions of The Innocents Abroad, The Boy Friend and Cry of the Raindrop, for which she won a Daniel Blum Theater World Award.

In December 1961, she made her Broadway debut as Liz Michaelson in the comedy Take Her, She's Mine. In Take Her She’s Mine, Harding played Art Carney’s youngest daughter. Elizabeth Ashley played her sister and won a Tony Award for her performance.

Harding was a regular cast member on The Richard Boone Show television anthology on NBC in 1963-1964. She appeared in a 1964 episode of The Cara Williams Show and in two episodes of The Fugitive: as Joanna Mercer ("Moon Child", 1965) and as Cathy ("Ten Thousand Pieces of Silver", 1966).

Her Universal made-for-TV movie called Dial Hot Line spawned a series about an inner city psychiatrist. Harding continued her role of Ann on the ABC medical drama Matt Lincoln in 1970–1971.

== Later life and death ==
Harding married Gary Thomas in the 1970s. She retired from show business in the late 1970s and the couple moved to Maine. They separated years later. She settled in Blue Hill, Maine where she became an artist.

The Richmond Times-Dispatch reported that Harding died in hospice care on March 22, 2019, at the age of 81, of natural causes. Her memorial service was held April 13, 2019, at 11 a.m. at Monumental United Methodist Church in Emporia, Virginia.

== Recognition ==
Harding received a Theatre World Award for her acting in Cry of the Raindrop in 1960–1961.

== Filmography ==
Year	Title	Role	Notes
1966	The Trouble with Angels	Rachel Devery	
1970	Dial Hot Line	Ann	TV film
