= Mary Wickes =

American actress (1910–1995)

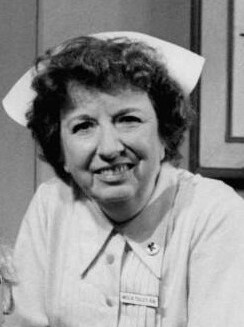
- Wickes in Doc (1975)
- Born: Mary Isabella Wickenhauser; June 13, 1910; University City, Missouri, U.S.
- Died: October 22, 1995 (aged 85); Los Angeles, California, U.S.
- Education: Washington University
- Occupation: Actress
- Years active: 1934–1995

Mary Wickes (born Mary Isabella Wickenhauser; June 13, 1910 – October 22, 1995) was an American character actress, who worked in both film and television. From the 1930s to 1990s, she often played supporting roles as prim, professional women – such as secretaries, nurses, nuns, therapists, teachers, and housekeepers – who made sarcastic quips when the leading characters fell short of her high standards, and she continued to perform until her death.

== Early life ==
Wickes was born to Frank Wickenhauser and his wife, Mary Isabella (née Shannon), in University City, a suburb of St. Louis, on June 13, 1910; she was of German, Scottish, and Irish extraction, and raised Protestant. Her parents were theater buffs, and they took her to plays from the time that she could stay awake through a matinee. An excellent student, she skipped two grades and graduated at 16 from Beaumont High School. She was accepted into Washington University in St. Louis, where she joined the debate team and the Phi Mu sorority, and was initiated into Mortar Board in 1929. She graduated in 1930 with a double major in English literature and political science. Although she had planned a career in law, a favorite professor encouraged her to try drama.

== Career ==
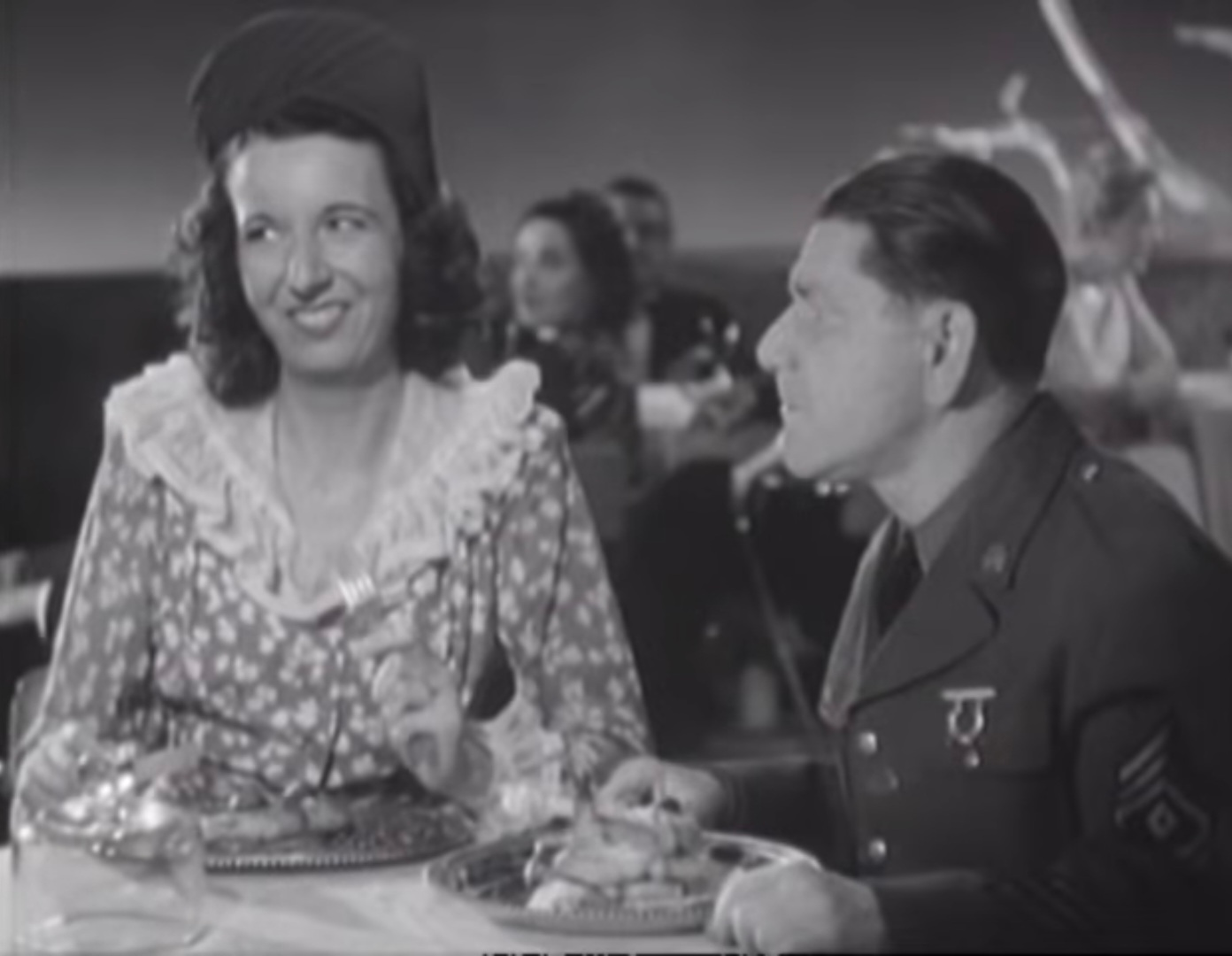
Mary Wickes (left) with Shemp Howard in Private Buckaroo (1942)

Wickes's first Broadway appearance was in Marc Connelly's The Farmer Takes a Wife in 1934 with Henry Fonda. She began acting in films in the late 1930s and became a member of the Orson Welles troupe on his radio drama The Mercury Theatre on the Air; she also appeared in Welles's film Too Much Johnson (1938). One of her early film appearances was in The Man Who Came to Dinner (1942), reprising her stage role of Nurse Preen.

A tall (5 ft 10 in, 1.78 m) woman with a distinctive voice, Wickes proved to be an adept comedienne. She attracted attention in Now, Voyager (1942) as the wisecracking nurse who helped Bette Davis's character during her mother's illness. She appeared earlier that year with Davis in The Man Who Came to Dinner and joined her six years later in June Bride. Wickes and Davis reteamed in 1965 when Wickes played a supporting role to Davis in a television pilot titled The Decorator.)

In 1942, she also had a large part in the Abbott and Costello comedy Who Done It? She continued playing supporting roles in films during the next decade, usually playing wisecracking characters. A prime example was her deadpan characterization of the harassed housekeeper in the Doris Day vehicles On Moonlight Bay and By the Light of the Silvery Moon, a character type she would repeat in the holiday classic White Christmas (1954), starring Bing Crosby, Danny Kaye, Rosemary Clooney, and Vera-Ellen. She played similar roles in two later movies with Rosalind Russell in the 1960s: The Trouble with Angels and Where Angels Go, Trouble Follows.

Wickes moved to television in 1949, starring in the title role of a Westinghouse Studio One version of Mary Poppins. In the 1950s, Wickes played the warm, jocular maid Katie in the Mickey Mouse Club serial Annette and regular roles in the sitcoms Make Room for Daddy and Dennis the Menace. She also played the part of a ballet teacher in the I Love Lucy episode "The Ballet" (1952). Wickes also served as the live-action reference model for Cruella De Vil in Walt Disney's One Hundred and One Dalmatians (1961), and played Mrs. Squires in the film adaptation of Meredith Willson's The Music Man (1962). In 1953, Wickes played Martha the housekeeper to Ezio Pinza's character in the short-lived Bonino. In 1954–1955, she played Alice on The Halls of Ivy, starring Ronald Colman.

In 1956, Wickes appeared with Thelma Ritter in "The Babysitter" and with Jessica Tandy in the “Toby” episodes of Alfred Hitchcock Presents. Wickes also appeared in two episodes of Zorro. In the 1961–1962 season, she appeared as Maxfield opposite Gertrude Berg and Cedric Hardwicke in Mrs. G. Goes to College. For her work in the sitcom, Wickes was nominated for an Emmy Award for Outstanding Performance in a Supporting Role by an Actress. In 1964, she appeared on The Donna Reed Show in the episode "First Addition".

In 1964, she appeared as Ida Goff in five episodes of the series Temple Houston. She played Adeline Ashley in "The Social Climbers", a 1967 episode of The Beverly Hillbillies. In the 1960s, she appeared in commercials for Ajax.

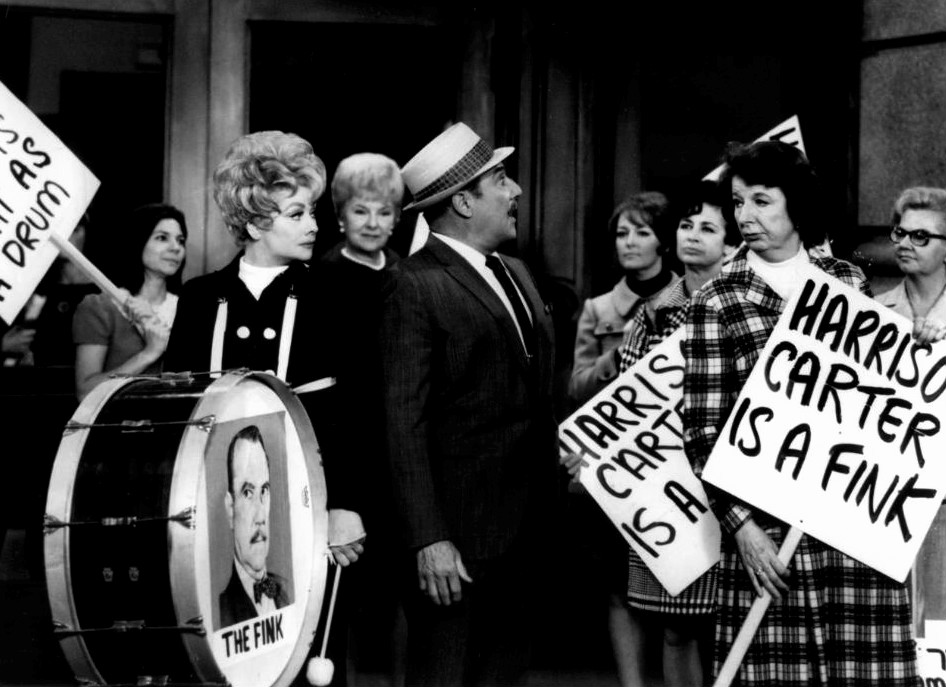
Mary Wickes (right) with Lucille Ball and Gale Gordon in episode "Lucy Goes on Strike" from Here's Lucy (1969)

A longtime friend of Lucille Ball, Wickes played frequent guest roles on I Love Lucy, The Lucy Show, and Here's Lucy. In 1970–1971, she guest-starred on The Doris Day Show. She was also a regular on the Sid and Marty Krofft children's television show Sigmund and the Sea Monsters and the sitcom Doc. She made numerous appearances as a celebrity panelist on the game show Match Game. By the 1980s, her appearances in television series such as Our Man Higgins, M*A*S*H, Columbo, The Love Boat, Kolchak: The Night Stalker, and Murder, She Wrote had made her a widely recognizable character actress. She also appeared in a variety of Broadway shows, including a 1979 revival of Oklahoma! as Aunt Eller.

Wickes's career had a resurgence in the late 1980s and 1990s. She was cast as the mother of Shirley MacLaine's character in the film Postcards from the Edge (1990) and portrayed Marie Murkin in the television movie and series adaptations of The Father Dowling Mysteries (1989–1991). She played notable roles in these years when she was cast as Sister Mary Lazarus in Sister Act (1992) and in the sequel Sister Act 2: Back in the Habit (1993). She also played Aunt March in the 1994 film version of Little Women.

== Death and legacy ==
Wickes suffered from numerous ailments in the last years of her life that cumulatively resulted in her hospitalization, where she fell and broke her hip. She died of complications following hip surgery on October 22, 1995, at the age of 85 at the UCLA Medical Center in Los Angeles.

Her final film role, voicing Laverne, a gargoyle, in Disney's animated feature The Hunchback of Notre Dame, was released posthumously in 1996. Wickes reportedly had only one voice recording session left for the film when she died. Jane Withers came in to finish the character's remaining six lines of dialogue.

Wickes was inducted posthumously into the St. Louis Walk of Fame in 2004.

== Personal life ==
Wickes left a large estate and made a $2 million bequest in memory of her parents, establishing the Isabella and Frank Wickenhauser Memorial Library Fund for Television, Film and Theater Arts at Washington University in St. Louis. Wickes was a lifelong Republican. She never married, nor did she have any children.

== Filmography ==
=== Film ===
Year	Title	Role	Notes
1942	The Man Who Came to Dinner	Nurse Preen	Wickes and Monty Woolley both reprised their roles from the original Broadway production; Screen debut
1942	Blondie's Blessed Event	Sarah Miller	
1942	Private Buckaroo	Bonnie-Belle Schlopkiss	
1942	The Mayor of 44th Street	Mamie	
1942	Now, Voyager	Nurse Dora Pickford	Based on the 1941 novel by Olive Higgins Prouty; Selected for preservation in the United States National Film Registry by the Library of Congress as being "culturally, historically, or aesthetically significant"
1942	Who Done It?	Juliet Collins	
1943	How's About It	'Mike' Tracy	
1943	Rhythm of the Islands	Susie Dugan	
1943	My Kingdom for a Cook	Agnes Willoughby	Uncredited
1943	Happy Land	Emmy	
1943	Higher and Higher	Sandy	
1948	June Bride	Rosemary McNally	
1948	The Decision of Christopher Blake	Clara	
1949	Anna Lucasta	Stella	
1950	The Petty Girl	Professor Whitman	
1951	On Moonlight Bay	Stella	Based loosely on the Penrod stories by Booth Tarkington
1951	I'll See You in My Dreams	Anna	
1952	Young Man with Ideas	Mrs. Jarvis Gilpin	
1952	The Story of Will Rogers	Mrs. Foster	Biography of humorist and movie star Will Rogers
1952	Bloodhounds of Broadway	Lady at Laundry	Uncredited
1953	By the Light of the Silvery Moon	Stella	Sequel to On Moonlight Bay
1953	Half a Hero	Mrs. Watts	
1953	The Actress	Emma Glavey	
1954	Ma and Pa Kettle at Home	Ms. Wetter	
1954	White Christmas	Emma Allen	Loosely based on the 1942 film Holiday Inn; First to be released in VistaVision
1954	Destry	Bessie Mae Curtis	
1955	Good Morning Miss Dove	Miss Ellwood	
1956	Dance with Me Henry	Miss Mayberry	Final Abbott and Costello film
1957	Don't Go Near the Water	Janie	
1958	The Proud Rebel	Mrs. Ainsley	Uncredited role
1959	It Happened to Jane	Matilda Runyon	Re-released in 1961 as Twinkle and Shine
1960	Cimarron	Mrs. Neal Hefner	
1961	One Hundred and One Dalmatians	Freckles (Voice)	Also served as Cruella de Vil's live model
1961	The Sins of Rachel Cade	Marie Grieux	
1962	The Music Man	Mrs. Squires (Pick-a-little Ladies)	In 2005, the film was selected for preservation in the United States National Film Registry by the Library of Congress as being "culturally, historically, or aesthetically significant"
1964	Fate Is the Hunter	Mrs. Llewlyn	Features an early film score by prolific composer Jerry Goldsmith; Nominated for a 1964 Academy Award in Best Cinematography (Black-and-White)
1964	Dear Heart	Miss Fox	
1965	How to Murder Your Wife	Harold's secretary	
1966	The Trouble with Angels	Sister Clarissa	
1967	The Spirit Is Willing	Gloria Tritt	
1968	Where Angels Go, Trouble Follows	Sister Clarissa	Sequel to The Trouble with Angels
1972	Napoleon and Samantha	Clara	
1972	Snowball Express	Miss Wigginton	
1980	Touched by Love	Margaret	Also called To Elvis, with Love
1985	The Canterville Ghost	Mrs. Umney	
1986	The Christmas Gift	Henrietta Sawyer	
1990	Postcards from the Edge	Grandma	Screenplay by Carrie Fisher is based on her 1987 semi-autobiographical novel
1992	Sister Act	Sister Mary Lazarus	
1993	Sister Act 2: Back in the Habit	Sister Mary Lazarus	
1994	Little Women	Aunt March	
1996	The Hunchback of Notre Dame	Laverne	Voice, posthumous release; final film role

=== Short films ===
Year	Title	Role	Notes
1935	Watch the Birdie		Uncredited role
1938	Too Much Johnson	Mrs. Battison	Believed to be lost, but in 2008 a print was discovered in a warehouse in Pordenone, Italy; Film premiered Wednesday, October 9, 2013, at the Pordenone Silent Film Festival; In 2014 the film was made available online by the National Film Preservation Foundation
1939	Seeing Red	Mrs. Smith	Uncredited role
1942	Keeping Fit	Ann	Andy's wife
1972	Open Window	Mrs. Sappleton	Based on “The Open Window” by Saki

=== Television ===
Year	Title	Role	Notes
1948	Actors Studio	Guest star	Episodes: "The Catbird Seat" (S 1:Ep 5); "Good Bye, Miss Lizzie Borden" (S 1:Ep 9)
1949	Ford Theatre	Daisy Stanley	Episode: "The Man Who Came to Dinner" (S 1:Ep 4)
1949	The Philco Television Playhouse	Amelia Coop	Episode: "Dark Hammock" (S 1:Ep 18)
1949	Studio One in Hollywood	Mary Poppins	Episode: "Mary Poppins" (S 2:Ep 15)
1950	The Chevrolet Tele-Theatre	Guest star	Episode: "Highly Recommended" (S 2:Ep 36)
1951	Four Star Revue	Guest host	Episode: "December 22, 1951" (S 2:Ep 17)
1952	I Love Lucy	Madame Lamond	Episode: "The Ballet" (S 1:Ep 19)
1952	Studio One in Hollywood	Guest star	Episode: "Miss Hargreaves" (S 4:Ep 28)
1953–1964	The Danny Thomas Show	Liz O'Neal	Main cast; Also known as Make Room for Daddy from 1953 to 1956
1954	Studio One in Hollywood	Guest star	Episode: "The Runaway" (S 6:Ep 16)
1954–1955	The Halls of Ivy	Alice	Many episodes are missing so that some credits and episode titles are unknown
1955	The Alcoa Hour	Sally Brass	Episode: "The Small Servant" (S 1:Ep 2)
1956	Alfred Hitchcock Presents	Mrs. Armstedder	Season 1 Episode 32: "The Baby Sitter"
1956	Alfred Hitchcock Presents	Mrs. Foster	Season 2 Episode 6: "Toby"
1957	Playhouse 90	Grace	Episode: "Circle of the Day" (S 1:Ep 35)
1958	Annette	Katy	Television serial that ran on The Mickey Mouse Club during the show's third season (1957-1958)
1958	Zorro	Dolores Bastinado	Episodes: "The Cross of the Ande" (S 1:Ep 32); "The Deadly Bolas" (S 1:Ep 33); "The Well of Death (S 1:Ep 34)
1959–1962	Dennis the Menace	Esther Cathcart	Recurring role
1959	Ford Startime	Widow Parke	Episode: "Cindy's Fella" (S 1:Ep 11)
1960	Shirley Temple Theatre	Hannah	Episode: "Little Men" (S 1:Ep 6)
1961–1962	Mrs. G. Goes to College	Maxfield	Mid-season changed to The Gertrude Berg Show
1961	The Dinah Shore Chevy Show	Edith Gunther	Episode: "Autumn Crocus" (S 5:Ep 20)
1961	Shirley Temple Theatre	Lootie	Episode: "The Princess and the Goblins" (S 1:Ep 24)
1963–1964	Temple Houston	Ida Goff	Main cast
1963	Bonanza	Martha	Episode: "The Colonel" (S 4:Ep 15)
1963	Our Man Higgins	Mme. Amethyst	Episode: "Love is Dandy" (S 1:Ep 33)
1963	The Lucy Show	Frances	Episodes: "Lucy Plays Cleopatra (S 2:Ep 1); "Lucy and Viv Play Softball" (S 2:Ep 3); "Lucy Puts Out a Fire at the Bank" (S 2:Ep 9)
1963	Kraft Suspense Theatre	Mrs. Mike	Episode: "The Machine That Played God" (S 1:Ep 7)
1963	Bob Hope Presents the Chrysler Theatre	Nurse	Episode: "It's Mental Work" (S 1:Ep 9)
1967	The Lucy Show	Aunt Agatha	Episode: "Lucy's Mystery Guest" (S 6:Ep 10)
1967	The Lucy Show	Miss Hurlow	Episode: "Lucy and Robert Goulet" (S 6:Ep 8)
1968–1971	Julia	Melba Chegley	Multiple
1969	Here's Lucy	Isabel	Episodes: "Lucy Goes on Strike" (S 1:Ep 16); "Lucy Gets Her Man" (S 1:Ep 21)
1969	Here's Lucy	Nurse	Episode: "Lucy and Harry's Tonsils" (S 2:Ep 5)
1969	The Doris Day Show	Emma Flood	Episode: "The Buddy" (S 1:Ep 17)
1969	The Queen & I	Hazel Becker	Episode: "Requiem for Becker" (S 1:Ep 4)
1970	The Debbie Reynolds Show	Aunt Harriet	Episode: "Advice and Dissent" (S 1:Ep 18)
1970	Here's Lucy	Mrs. Whitmark's Maid	Episode: "Lucy, the Diamond Cutter" (S 3:Ep 10)
1971	Here's Lucy	Sister Paula Carter	Episode: "Lucy and Her All-Nun Band" (S 4:Ep 8)
1971	Columbo	Landlady	Episode: "Suitable for Framing" (S 1:Ep 6)
1971	The Man and the City	Cora	Episode: "Running Scared" (S 1:Ep 8)
1972	Here's Lucy	Nurse Sylvia Ogilvy	Episodes: "Lucy's Big Break" (S 5:Ep 1); "Lucy and Eva Gabor Are Hospital Roomies" (S 5:Ep 2)
1972	Hallmark Hall of Fame	Nurse Preen	Episode: "The Man Who Came to Dinner" (S 22:Ep 2); Production adapted by Sam Denoff and Bill Persky, directed by Buzz Kulik; The New York Times criticized Denoff's updating of the original play, listing the production in its 1972 Worst of Television; Welles's Whiteside was a television personality competing with Johnny Carson
1972	Sanford and Son	Mary	Episode: "The Light Housekeeper" (S 2:Ep 14)
1973	Here's Lucy	Violet Barker	Episode: "Lucy Plays Cops and Robbers" (S 6:Ep 14)
1973–1975	Sigmund and the Sea Monsters	Zelda Marshall	Main cast
1974	Here's Lucy	Clara Simpson	Episode: "Lucy, the Sheriff" (S 6:Ep 18)
1974	Kolchak: The Night Stalker	Dr. Bess Winestock	Episode: "They Have Been, They Are, They Will Be..." (S 1:Ep 3)
1975–1976	Doc	Nurse Beatrice Tully	Main cast
1975	M*A*S*H	Colonel Rachel Reese	Episode: "House Arrest" (S 3:Ep 18)
1976–1978	Match Game	Herself	25 daytime episodes, 4 in syndication.
1977	Lucy Calls the President	Aunt Millie	A Lucille Ball Special
1977–1978	Tabitha	Cassandra	Episodes: "Halloween Show" (S 1:Ep 3); "Tabitha's Party" (S 1:Ep 12)
1981	The Waltons	Octavia	Episode: "The Hostage" (S 9:Ep 21)
1981	Trapper John, M.D.	Miranda	Episode: "Hate Is Enough" (S 3:Ep 4)
1982	Trapper John, M.D.	Hazel	Episode: "The Good Life" (S 4:Ep 9)
1984	Matt Houston	Nellie Cochran	Episode: "Wanted Man" (S 3:Ep 1)
1984	Punky Brewster	Sister Bernadette	Episode: "Take Me Out to the Ballgame" (S 1:Ep 6)
1984	Trapper John, M.D.	Rocy Flanagan	Episode: "Of Cats, Crashes, and Creeps" (S 6:Ep 6)
1985	ABC Afterschool Special	Ms. Crandall	Episode: "First the Egg" (S 13:Ep 6)
1985	Murder, She Wrote	Mrs. Alva Crane	Episode: "Widow, Weep for Me" (S 2:Ep 1)
1987	Almost Partners	Aggie Greyson	Television film
1987–1991	Father Dowling Mysteries	Marie Murkin in S3 E10 introduced as Mrs. Gillespie	Main cast
1987	Punky Brewster	Mrs. Dempsey	Episode: "So Long, Studio" (S 3:Ep 19)
1988	Highway to Heaven	Minnie	Episode: "Country Doctor" (S 4:Ep 14)
1995	Life With Louie	Grandma	Voice, Main cast

== Awards and nominations ==
Year	Award	Category	Work	Result	Ref
1962	Primetime Emmy Awards	Outstanding Performance in a Supporting Role by an Actress	Mrs. G. Goes to College	Nominated	
1993	American Comedy Awards	Funniest Supporting Actress in a Motion Picture	Sister Act	Nominated	
