= Jane Trahey =

American writer and advertiser (1923–2000)

- Born: November 19, 1923; Chicago
- Died: April 22, 2000 (aged 76); Kent, Connecticut
- Education: Mundelein College; University of Wisconsin; Columbia University
- Occupations: Advertiser, writer
- Notable work: The Trouble with Angels (Original story for the film)

Jane Trahey (November 19, 1923 – April 22, 2000) was an American businesswoman and writer. She is best known as one of the pioneers of advertising during the 1960s. Her awards include the Advertising Woman of the Year award in 1969 from the American Advertising Federation. She acted as the chief for advertising campaigns on behalf of Bill Blass, Elizabeth Arden, and Blackglama mink, among others.

== Biography ==
=== Early life and education ===
Trahey was born in Chicago on November 19, 1923 and studied at Catholic schools. After attending Chicago's Mundelein College and graduating in 1943, she continued her education at the University of Wisconsin-Madison for two years. Trahey earned the degree of Master of Fine Arts in 1975 from Columbia University in New York.

=== Career ===
Before working for the Chicago Daily News in the survey research department, Trahey worked in the Chicago Tribune's news morgue. Her first advertising job was for the Chicago department store, Carson, Pirie, Scott & Co. as copywriter after a period in the retail shop as receptionist. Her work at the firm caught the attention of retail store Neiman-Marcus where she later worked as copywriter in 1947 in Dallas, Texas.

Trahey worked at Neiman-Marcus in Texas for nine years where she became the director of advertising and sales. Her work at Neiman-Marcus earned Trahey a reputation for her "innovative fashion copywriting". She even tested different colors with scented inks in retail ads.

For the lingerie and hosiery company, Julius Kayser Inc., she created an in-house agency, Advertising Associates, after she moved to New York in 1956. Later, in 1958, Trahey established Jane Trahey Associates, her own agency specializing in cosmetics and fashion advertising. With the addition of partner Franchellie Cadwell in 1962, the agency was renamed Trahey/Cadwell Associates. In June 1964 the partnership ended and the agency worked under the new name "Trahey Associates/Advertising" until 1965 when the name changed again to "Trahey Advertising". Between 1965 and 1966 the agency worked for well known companies including Charles of the Ritz, Rob Roy Shirts for Boys, Pauline Trigere, Elizabeth Arden, and Union Carbide Corporation's textile department.

Art director Henry Wolf became a partner in 1967 and the name of the agency changed again to "Trahey/Wolf Advertising". The partnership lasted until 1972 when Wolf left. In 1976, the shop changed its name again to "Trahey/Rogers Advertising" reflecting the addition of partner Peter Rogers. This partnership lasted until 1978 when Trahey left the agency, sold the shop to Rogers, and became a consultant.

During her career, her agency created advertising campaigns for clients including Bill Blass, Elizabeth Arden, and Olivetti. Well-known slogans her agency created include "Foot-loose and Famolare" for Famolare footwear, "It's not fake anything, it's real Dynel" for Union Carbide's synthetic hair, and "Danskins are not just for dancing" for Danskin shoes. For her campaign for the Great Lakes Mink Association, her employee Norman Sunshine created the slogan "What Become a Legend Most?" and employee Peter Rogers persuaded major stars like Lauren Bacall, Marlene Dietrich, Bette Davis, and Judy Garland to pose in a Blackglama mink coat under the slogan, "What becomes a legend most?" Their payment was the coat and the portrait, shot by Richard Avedon.

Trahey attempted to get credit for creating many of the slogans that her employees came up with, as detailed in Norman Sunshine's 2011 book Double Life. He also referred to her as being a lesbian who dated his gay partner's ex-wife, which is how Sunshine got his position with Trahey's agency. "Double Life" also says Trahey broke up with the partner's ex-wife to run off with a nun from Trahey's past in Illinois.

Apart from advertising, she also served in feminist movements and later became a writer and lecturer. Among her writings was an autobiography, Jane Trahey on Women & Power: Who's Got It. How to Get It. She wrote a play, Ring Round the Bathtub, which was produced on Broadway in 1972 starring Elizabeth Ashley. Her novel Life With Mother Superior was the basis for the film The Trouble with Angels, starring Hayley Mills and Rosalind Russell. She also wrote Thursdays Till Nine and Pecked to Death by Goslings.

== Death and recognition ==
After working for more than 40 years, Trahey died of cancer at her home in Kent, Connecticut on April 22, 2000, at the age of 76.

She received more than 200 awards over the course of her career. Among others, she was honored with the Advertising Woman of the Year award in 1969 by the American Advertising Federation. In 1979, the Supersisters trading card set was produced and distributed; one of the cards featured Trahey's name and picture.

Rocky Piliero, production manager of Trahey's agency during 1969, said on her death that, "Ms. Trahey didn't like accounts. She liked projects. She liked to do something new. She'd be gung-ho for six months, then get bored."
