= Matt Lincoln =

American television series

- Genre: Medical drama
- Starring: Vince Edwards
- Country of origin: United States
- Original language: English
- No. of seasons: 1
- No. of episodes: 16

Production
- Running time: 60 min
- Production company: Universal Television

Original release
- Network: ABC
- Release: September 24, 1970 – January 14, 1971

Matt Lincoln is an American medical drama series which aired on ABC as part of its 1970–71 lineup.

Based on a Universal made-for-TV movie called Dial Hot Line, Matt Lincoln starred Vince Edwards (best known as the lead in Ben Casey a few years earlier) as Dr. Matt Lincoln, a "community psychiatrist" who had founded a telephone hotline for troubled teenagers. He also operated a free walk-in clinic to help the needy with their mental health concerns, in addition to a private practice which apparently paid the bills for the other two endeavors. Community psychiatrist Dr. D.F. Muhich was a model for the Lincoln character as well as a consultant on the TV show. At the helpline, Matt was assisted by Tag (Chelsea Brown) and Jimmy (Felton Perry), two "hip" young blacks; Ann (June Harding), an attractive young white woman, and Kevin, a somewhat cynical police officer. Dean Jagger played Matt's father Dr. Lincoln Sr.

The show's theme tune, "Hey, Who Really Cares" was written by Oliver Nelson and Linda Perhacs, and performed by God's Children, a band formed by Ray Jimenez and Willie Garcia, previously members of Thee Midniters. A full-length version of their recording under the title "Hey, Does Somebody Care" was issued as a single, while the original song appears on Perhacs' legendary album Parallelograms.

== History ==
Media critic Harlan Ellison analyzed this show in his column for the Los Angeles Free Press, reprinted in his anthology The Other Glass Teat. The original made-for-TV film, Dial Hot Line, had a social worker called David Leopold, also played by Edwards. Ellison asked executive producer Irving Elman about the name change, and was told that there'd been a number of jokes about it and references to the Leopold and Loeb murder case. Elman was afraid viewers would make the same connection. Subsequent to this interview, Ellison said he received a letter from a Minneapolis hotline worker, Martha Rosen. She described unrealistic, authoritarian portrayals in Dial Hot Line that might damage the credibility of real hotlines, both with the people who needed them, and with parents and authorities.

Ellison also reprinted sections from Elman's prospectus focusing on Edwards' character, described as an example of "the new breed" of mental health professionals, serving "the many, rather than the few" and involved in a wide array of volunteer activities, somehow managing to earn enough to drive a Mustang, have a Marina apartment and a sailboat. Ellison pointed out "the dichotomy between Matt Lincoln's professional pursuits, dealing with the broken, the twisted, the poor, and the deprived, and his status symbols of the Establishment."

Unlike Edwards' previous medical drama, Matt Lincoln never developed much of an audience and was cancelled at midseason.

== Episodes ==
| No. | Title | Directed by | Written by | Original release date |
|---|---|---|---|---|
| TV–Movie | "Dial Hot Line" | Jerry Thorpe | Story by : Don Ingalls & Carol Sobieski; Teleplay by : Carol Sobieski | March 8, 1970 |
| 1 | "Sheila" | Allen Reisner | Charles Israel | September 24, 1970 |
An unwed mother (Patty Duke) seeks help in placing her baby up for adoption.
| 2 | "Charles" | Ralph Senensky | Edward J. Lasko | October 1, 1970 |
Matt aids police in capturing a sniper (Martin Sheen) who snaps after a police action.
| 3 | "Nina" | Robert Day | Hal Sitowitz | October 8, 1970 |
A supposedly perfect daughter (Belinda Montgomery) is in reality a heroin addict, and is helped by Dr. Lincoln through encounter sessions.
| 4 | "Steve" | Gerald Mayer | Story by : Andy White; Teleplay by : Andy White & Robert Collins | October 15, 1970 |
Dr. Lincoln becomes involved in a conflict between a major chemical manufacturer and his son over pollution.
| 5 | "Jilly" | Abner Biberman | Jean Holloway | October 22, 1970 |
Dr. Lincoln's former love (Barbara Feldon), the Governor's daughter cannot adjust to permanent blindness that was caused in a plane accident.
| 6 | "Nick" | Allen Reisner | Story by : Don Ingalls; Teleplay by : Preston Wood & Don Ingalls | October 29, 1970 |
A young priest (Pete Duel) is forced to make a decision between marriage and the church.
| 7 | "Lori" | Seymour Robbie | Story by : Theodore Apstein & Ben Masselink; Teleplay by : Sy Salkowitz & Preston Wood | November 5, 1970 |
Dr. Lincoln's life is threatened as he tries to save an accidentally-overdosed, intellectually disabled girl in a commune where the "family" leader has taken her.
| 8 | "Doc" | Gerald Mayer | Henry Misrock | November 12, 1970 |
Returning to Lakeview, Dr. Lincoln tries to help a colleague (David Wayne), the town's only doctor, a widower with a drinking problem.
| 9 | "Angie" | Jeffrey Hayden | Jean Holloway | November 19, 1970 |
Dr. Lincoln teams with his father (Dean Jagger), a retired medical specialist, to try and save an unidentified diabetic expectant mother.
| 10 | "Yumiko" | Allen Reisner | Story by : Marcus Demian & Sy Salkowitz; Teleplay by : Sy Salkowitz | December 3, 1970 |
Dr. Lincoln helps a young frightened Japanese girl stowaway, suffering from malnutrition, who has come to America seeking her GI boyfriend.
| 11 | "Billy" | Corey Allen | Pat Fielder | December 10, 1970 |
When a 13-year-old black youngster, son of a white father (Darren McGavin), threatens to jump from a building, Dr. Lincoln is summoned.
| 12 | "Lia" | Marc Daniels | Jean Holloway | December 17, 1970 |
Lia McKenna, the widowed mother of a five-year-old boy, accepts Dr. Lincoln's marriage proposal, but tragic news soon arrives that makes the event a bittersweet occasion.
| 13 | "Adam" | Marc Daniels | Jean Holloway | December 24, 1970 |
As a custody hearing approaches to adopt Adam, Dr. Lincoln finds that the child will not communicate with him.
| 14 | "Jimmy" | Seymour Robbie | Story by : Albert Ruben & Sy Salkowitz; Teleplay by : Sy Salkowitz | December 31, 1970 |
Dr. Lincoln investigates a supposed model high school with a ruthless principal.
| 15 | "Karen" | Jeannot Szwarc | Story by : Sidney Ellis; Teleplay by : Sy Salkowitz | January 7, 1971 |
A disturbed young mother attempts to overcome emotional problems with the aid of Dr. Lincoln so that she can stop abusing her child.
| 16 | "Christopher" | Vince Edwards | Jean Holloway | January 14, 1971 |
Dr. Lincoln attempts to help a brilliant concert pianist (John Rubinstein) cope with his loss of hearing.
