= Dolores Sutton =

American actress (1927–2009)

- Born: Dolores Lila Silverstein; February 4, 1927; New York City, US
- Died: May 11, 2009 (aged 82); Englewood, New Jersey, US
- Education: New York University
- Years active: 1950–1991
- Spouse: Michael Reis (1956–1958; divorced)

Dolores Sutton (born Dolores Lila Silverstein, February 4, 1927 – May 11, 2009) was an American actress, writer and playwright. Her career spanned seven decades and encompassed television, stage and movie roles.

== Early years ==
Born in New York City to Benjamin and Mary Silverstein, Sutton graduated from New York University in 1948 with a B.A. in philosophy.

== Career ==
In 1960, playwright Sophie Treadwell selected Sutton for the female lead in a revival of her play, Machinal after having seen the actress perform on television.

While working on her master's degree, Sutton wrote a radio script (Siblings), sold it to NBC, and landed the voice role. This started her career as an actress and writer.

As an actress, Sutton worked in experimental theater and was a star with the National Repertory Company. Her Broadway credits included Rhinoceros (1961), General Seeger (1962), and My Fair Lady (1993).

Sutton's work as a playwright included adapting Thomas Wolfe's The Web and the Rock for the stage. Critic John Simon's review of a production of the play in New York magazine included the comment, "Most of the novel's sweep, its period panorama, was gone; what was left was the churning, puerile poeticism." Sutton also had the lead in the play, leading another reviewer to write, "She is far better as an actress than as a writer."

== Death ==
Sutton died of cancer on May 11, 2009, at the Actor's Home in Englewood, New Jersey, aged 82.

== Acting credits ==
=== Stage ===
Sutton played lead roles in three Broadway plays.

- 1960: Rhinoceros as Daisy
- 1961: General Seeger as The Woman
- 1994: My Fair Lady as Mrs. Higgins

Her Off-Broadway credits include leading roles in the following plays:

- 1956: The Man with the Golden Arm as Molly
- 1958: Career as Barbara Neilson
- 1960: Machinal as Helen Jones when she won the Vernon Rice Citation
- 1963: Brecht on Brecht
- 1969: To Be Young Gifted and Black in various roles
- 1972: The Web and the Rock as Esther (also the playwright)
- 1973: The Seagull as Irina Arkadina
- 1990: What's Wrong with This Picture as Bella

=== Film ===
- 1958: The Mugger
- 1963: Nine Miles to Noon as Julia Dimou
- 1966: The Trouble with Angels as Sister Rose Marie
- 1968: Where Angels Go, Trouble Follows as Sister Rose Marie
- 1986: Dream Lover (voice)
- 1988: Crossing Delancey as Aunt Miriam
- 1989: Crimes and Misdemeanors as Judah's Secretary
- 1990: Tales from the Darkside: The Movie as Amanda (segment "Cat From Hell")

=== Television ===
- 1963: Gunsmoke as Jenny Gant in “The Bad One” (S8:E20)
