= Lindenwold Castle =

Castle in Ambler, Pennsylvania

Coordinates: 40.15358°N 75.21048°W

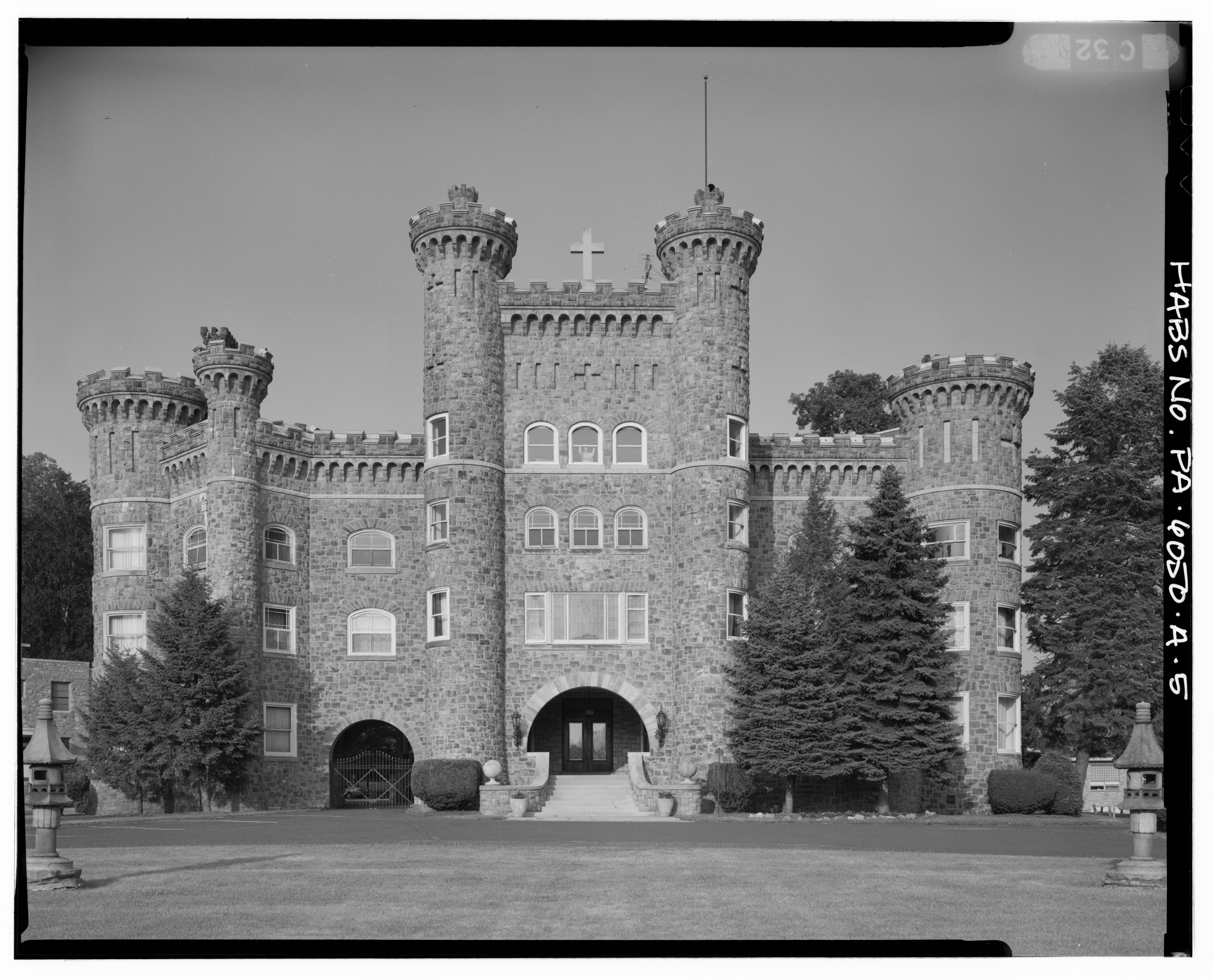
Lindenwold Castle, home of Richard Mattison

Lindenwold Castle, also known as the Mattison Estate, is the former personal estate in Ambler, Pennsylvania, United States of asbestos magnate Richard Van Zeelust Mattison (1851–1935) of the Keasbey and Mattison Company. It was designed by Milton Bean and built in 1890.

== History ==
The estate was once 400 acres (160 ha). In 1912, it sustained a partial remodel to resemble Windsor Castle, with Mattison commissioning Italian stonemasons and German craftsmen to create its regal iron gates.

Mattison lived in the castle with his second wife, Mary, for more than 20 years. When the Great Depression hit in 1929, Mattison was forced to sell the property and move into smaller accommodations. The transaction took place in 1936 upon Mattison's death; the Sisters of the Holy Family of Nazareth were the purchasers, and they converted the mansion into an orphanage called St. Mary's, which became St. Mary's Villa for Children and Families, and then St. Mary's Villa. By then, the once-400-acre estate had been reduced to 50 acres.

In 1966, the estate was used for exterior shots for the movie The Trouble With Angels, which stars Rosalind Russell and Hayley Mills. In 1968, the sequel to that movie, Where Angels Go, Trouble Follows, was also filmed at that location.

== Modern use ==
As of 2012, the castle retained original elements such as a stairwell bordered by stained glass, gilded wallpapered ceilings, and carved marble fireplaces.

As of November 2013, the estate was still being used by the Sisters of the Holy Family of Nazareth to care for "85 abused and neglected youths between the ages of 13 and 18, who receive residential care and special education along with an outpatient program for mental health services." However, an "agreement of sale" was in the works with a realty business owner named Leonard Poncia. Poncia purchased the property and subsequently sold off its two gatehouses. The buyer of the gatehouses, Peter Monaghann, then leased one of the houses to a tenant and began renovating the second. Despite all the changes of hands, the castle was added to the National Register of Historic Places.

On November 7, 2014, the United States Department of Interior issued a letter which determined the property eligible for listing on the National Register of Historic Places. Plans, however, began to emerge about a mixed-use development on the property, which began raising concerns about many issues, including increased, unwanted traffic to the area and the degradation of the area's open space. Some parties expressed interest in preserving the property as open-space park land and using the building as an art gallery or events space.

In November 2017, the site was still being discussed as part of a mixed-use development that would preserve parts of the historical property while infringing on other attributes of it, like a two-acre lake that would be reduced in size. It then came to light that the Upper Dublin Planning Commission "gave the green light for a large portion of the estate to be developed by the Goldenberg Group, which partnered with Guidi Homes to build 104 new carriage house- and villa-inspired homes" on the property.

Poncia then sold another portion of the property to a joint venture with the intention to build a luxury senior-living complex. The complex was proposed to include "independent living, assisted living, and a memory unit" with "an indoor pool, fitness center, yoga studio, two movie theaters, a dog wash and dog run, art studio, multiple indoor and outdoor dining venues, bars and lounges, barbecue grills, fire pits, and a putting green."

On January 16, 2019, and made effective January 25, 2019, the Lindenwold Residential Associates LLC, a limited-liability company, became legally bound to uphold the terms of a deed of preservation easement granted to the Preservation Alliance for Greater Philadelphia, a not-for-profit "qualified conservation organization," which would be, in effect, the body charged with stewardship over the historic property. Citizens continued to raise concerns about the property's fate, with concerns including increased traffic, the degradation of the historic estate's landscaping, the reduction of the estate's lake, the ruination of the gardens, and the creation of a dam on the property.

The Goldenberg Group "promis[ed] to plant 1,600 new trees; over 2,400 shrubs; and 400 ornamental grasses with 3,000 perennials," but it was unclear whether the promises would be fulfilled as "bulldozers began tearing into the grounds" in March 2019, though the terms of the deed of preservation easement contained stipulations involving the preservation of architectural as well as open space. The same month, more details emerged about the new construction, including that the senior-living facility would include "156 independent living units, 62 assisted living units and 32 memory care units."

In 2024, the castle was put up for sealed-bid auction, with a starting bid of $1.5 million. It was appraised for $1.9 million in 2022.

Approved for residential units and office spaces, Lindenwold Castle was still up for auction in 2025 at a starting price of $1.5 million.
