= Dial Hot Line =

- Genre: Drama
- Written by: Don Ingalls; Carol Sobieski
- Screenplay by: Carol Sobieski
- Story by: Don Ingalls
- Directed by: Jerry Thorpe
- Starring: Vince Edwards; Chelsea Brown; Felton Perry; Michael Larrain; June Harding; Kim Hunter
- Theme music composer: Oliver Nelson
- Country of origin: United States
- Original language: English

Production
- Producers: John Badham; William Sackheim
- Cinematography: Jack A. Marta
- Editor: Edward M. Abroms
- Running time: 98 min.
- Production company: Universal Television

Original release
- Network: ABC
- Release: March 8, 1970

Dial Hot Line is a 1970 American drama made-for-TV film, starring Vince Edwards, Chelsea Brown, Felton Perry, June Harding and Kim Hunter. It originally aired on March 8, 1970 in the ABC Movie of the Week space.

== Cast ==
- Vince Edwards as David Leopold
- Chelsea Brown as Gibson
- Felton Perry as Jimmy
- June Harding as Ann
- Kim Hunter as Mrs. Edith Carruthers
- Lane Bradbury as Pam Carruthers
- Michael Larrain as Kevin
- Elliott Street as Joe
