= Chelsea Brown =

American actress (1942–2017)

- Born: Lois Brown; December 6, 1942; Chicago, Illinois, U.S.
- Died: March 27, 2017 (aged 74); Chicago, Illinois, U.S.
- Occupations: Actress; comedian; dancer
- Years active: 1968–2003
- Known for: Rowan & Martin's Laugh-In, Number 96 and E Street
- Spouses: Vic Rooney (m. 1994; died 2002) Kel Hirst (m. 1977–1983)

Chelsea Brown (born Lois Brown, December 6, 1942 – March 27, 2017) was an American-born actress of television and film, comedian and dancer, who appeared as a regular performer in comedy series Rowan & Martin's Laugh-In. She had a successful career in her native land before emigrating to Australia, where she became well-known mostly for her roles in soap opera/serials including top-rating Number 96 and as Abby Rossiter Patchett on E Street.

== Early career in the United States ==
Brown was born as Lois Brown in Chicago, Illinois to Mildred and Edward Brown. She appeared in a segment of a first-season episode of Love, American Style titled "Love and the Militant", with fellow Laugh-In alumnus Stu Gilliam. Other guest roles included appearances in Marcus Welby, M.D., Ironside, Matt Lincoln, The Flying Nun, Match Game (in 1974) and, in the UK, The Two Ronnies, singing The Carpenters song "Let Me Be the One". She also appeared in the films Sweet Charity (1969), Dial Hot Line (1970) and The Thing with Two Heads (1972).

== Emigration and career in Australia ==
Brown met and became engaged to Australian property developer Kelvin Barry Hirst while holidaying in Acapulco, Mexico in 1973. Brown emigrated to Australia shortly after that, Hirst became her manager and they were married in 1977. They divorced in the early 1980s. Hirst features as the male vocal on Brown's record Day Dreaming (October 1975). In 1982 Brown released a second album self-titled Chelsea.

Brown became a familiar figure on Australian television, with appearances on Graham Kennedy's Blankety Blanks, Jimmy Hannan's Celebrity Squares plus ongoing roles in soap operas Number 96 (in 1977), The Power, The Passion (1989), in a regular role as the resident restaurant singer and Network Ten's E Street (in 1990–1991) as a nightclub singer who falls for the charms of local publican Ernie Patchett and various advertisements. She had a guest role in the Australian-filmed TV series revival of Mission: Impossible (1988). Film roles in Australia included The Return of Captain Invincible (1982) and Welcome to Woop Woop (1997).

In the mid-1990s, she was married to fellow E Street actor Vic Rooney, who died in 2002, after which she returned to the United States.

== Death ==
Brown died in her hometown of Chicago, Illinois, March 27, 2017, at the age of 74, from pneumonia.

== Filmography ==
=== Film ===
Year	Title	Role	Type
1968	Head	Belly Dancer (uncredited)	Feature film
1969	Sweet Charity	Dancer (uncredited)	Feature film
1972	The Thing with Two Heads	Lila	Feature film
1982	The Return of Captain Invincible	Tour Guide	Feature film
1997	Welcome to Woop Woop	Maude	Feature film

=== Television ===
Year	Title	Role	Type
1969	The Flying Nun	Paola Guzman	TV series, 1 episode
1969	Love, American Style	Miss Smith (segment "Love and the Militant")	TV series, 1 episode
1970	Dial Hot Line	Gibson	TV movie
1970	Matt Lincoln	Tag	TV series, 3 episodes
1970	The Name of the Game	Darlene	TV series, 1 episode
1970	The Cliff	Tag	TV movie
1971	Ironside	Nancy Babcock	TV series, 1 episode
1971	And They Forgot God	Miss Wallach	TV short
1972	Marcus Welby, M.D.	Tallie Hughes	TV series, 1 episode
1973	Police Story	Mrs. Mckay	TV series, 1 episode
1975	That's My Mama	Joanne Roberts	TV series, 1 episode
1975	Bronk	Celeste	TV series, 1 episode
1976	Arena	Barby	TV movie / TV pilot
1976	King's Men	Morna	TV series, 1 episode
1976–1977	Number 96	Hope Jackson	TV series, 27 episodes
1977	Number 96: The Final Night	Herself	TV special
1977	Hotel Story		TV series, 1 episode
1981	Holiday Island	Jodi Dean	TV series, 2 episodes: "Fugitive", "Lisa's Pup"
1982	Instant TV	Various characters	TV pilot
1988; 1989	Mission: Impossible	Ballet teacher / Laura Ann Wilson	TV series, season 1, 2 episodes
1989	The Power, The Passion	Chanteuse	TV series, recurring role
1989–1990	E Street	Abby Rossiter	TV series, 89 episodes
2003	Grass Roots	Stephanie Gruen	1 episode
