= Telluride Foundation =

Non-Profit Organization or NPO

- Founded: June 2000
- Founder: Ron Allred; Hideo "Joe" Morita
- Location: 220 E. Colorado Avenue, Suite 106, PO Box 4222, Telluride, Colorado, 81435
- Key people: Jason Corzine (President and CEO)
- Website: telluridefoundation.org

Telluride Foundation is a non-profit organization which functions in the Telluride region, including three counties in southwest Colorado. The Foundation was established in 2000, and operates initiatives, makes grants, and invests in communities.

== History ==
Telluride Foundation was started in June 2000 by owners of Telluride Ski Resort, Ron Allred and Hideo "Joe" Morita, with US$100,000 contributions from 13 individual contributors. Some of the areas the foundation provides funding for include education, early childhood development, environment, healthcare, arts and culture, sports, and human services. Paul Major has served as the president and CEO of the organization since its establishment. Jason Corzine was named as the new president and CEO in 2022.

== Initiatives ==
Telluride Foundation awards college scholarships and support to high school students in the Telluride region under programs such as the Chang Chavkin Scholars Program. The program is supported by and named after Laura Chang and Arnie Chavkin, and provides a four-year scholarship package of up to US$60,000 to the recipient students, as well as guidance and mentoring before and during college. The foundation also supports the Neil Armstrong Scholarship, which was started by friends and family members of Neil Armstrong in his honor and awarded to a Telluride regional high school student studying STEM in college. Armstrong was a board member of the foundation.

The Telluride Foundation and Markle Foundation provide funding to regional businesses under the Skillful Colorado initiative. In October 2018, the Economic Development Administration awarded a three-year grant to the Telluride Foundation to develop rural economies in Montrose County and San Miguel County, in partnership with Telluride Foundation.

In 2019, Telluride Foundation started a US$2 million working capital loan fund, called Telluride Regional Loan Fund, to support rural businesses in southwest Colorado. The fund provides loans of US$25,000 to 100,000 for companies based out of the counties of Montrose, Ouray, San Miguel, Dolores and San Juan.

The Telluride Foundation Grants Committee in 2019 funded around US$500,000 in grants for capital projects, which were leveraged with US$6.5 million in additional grants and fundraising. Their 2022 Community Grants, awarded $1,000,000 to regional nonprofits. These grants will be distributed to organizations working daily to improve the quality of life in the communities of Nucla/Naturita, Norwood, Telluride, Rico, Ridgway, Ouray, and everywhere in between.

The foundation has co-ordinated the project of providing high-speed broadband connection to rural parts of San Miguel County.

The foundation's Telluride Venture Accelerator initiative aims at developing new businesses in the domains of outdoor recreation, tourism, natural products, health, energy, water and education. The foundation started a healthcare initiative called Tri-County Health Network (TCHNetwork) in 2010, which is now a supporting non-profit organization of Telluride Foundation.

During the COVID-19 pandemic, Telluride Foundation started the Coronavirus Regional Response Fund in order to provide funding for emergencies.

== Awards and recognition ==
- 2018 Colorado Governor's Citizenship Medal (Growth & Innovation category) - Paul Major
- 2019 Inclusiveness and Racial Equity Award at the Colorado Nonprofit Week Awards - TCHNetwork

== Logo ==
In 2015, the foundation claimed that the 2016 Summer Olympics logo was copied from the foundation's trademarked logo which had been in use since 2000. The foundation's logo had earlier been copied for promoting Carnaval 2004 in Salvador, Brazil.
