= Bob Hope filmography =

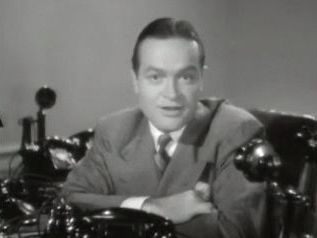
Bob Hope in The Ghost Breakers trailer (1940)

This is a selection of films and television appearances by British-American comedian and actor Bob Hope (1903–2003). Hope, a former boxer, began his acting career in 1925 in various vaudeville acts and stage performances

Hope's feature film debut came in The Big Broadcast of 1938. (although he made his debut in film short Going Spanish). Hope continued to act, in addition to stand-up comedy USO performances for American military personnel that were stationed overseas. Hope's last starring role in a theatrical feature film was the 1972 comedy Cancel My Reservation; his final starring role in a film was the 1986 made-for-television movie A Masterpiece of Murder). He retired in 1998.

== Filmography ==
=== Film shorts ===
- Going Spanish (1934) as Bob
- Paree, Paree (1934) as Peter
- Calling All Tars (1935)
- Double Exposure (1935)
- The Old Grey Mayor (1935)
- Soup for Nuts (1935)
- Watch the Birdie (1935)
- Shop Talk (1936)
- Screen Snapshots Series 19, No. 6 (1940)
- Hedda Hopper's Hollywood No. 4 (1942)
- Don't Hook Now (1943)
- Show Business at War (1943)
- Combat America (1943)
- Strictly G.I. (1943)
- The All-Star Bond Rally (1945)
- Hollywood Victory Caravan (1945)
- March of Time Volume 14, No. 1: Is Everybody Listening? (1947)
- Weekend in Hollywood (1947)
- Screen Actors (1950)
- You Can Change the World (1951)
- Screen Snapshots: Memorial to Al Jolson (1952)
- Screen Snapshots: Hollywood's Invisible Man (1954)
- Screen Snapshots: Hollywood Beauty (1955)
- Showdown at Ulcer Gulch (1956)
- The Heart of Show Business (1957)
- Screen Snapshots: Hollywood Star Night (1957)
- Rowan & Martin at the Movies (1968)

=== Theatrical features ===
- The Big Broadcast of 1938 (1938) as Buzz Fielding
- College Swing (1938) as Bud Brady
- Give Me a Sailor (1938) as Jim Brewster
- Thanks for the Memory (1938) as Steve Merrick
- Never Say Die (1939) as John Kidley
- Some Like It Hot (1939; AKA Rhythm Romance) as Nicky Nelson
- The Cat and the Canary (1939) as Wally Campbell
- Road to Singapore (1940) as Ace Lannigan
- The Ghost Breakers (1940) as Larry Lawrence
- Road to Zanzibar (1941) as Fearless
- Caught in the Draft (1941) as Don Bolton
- Nothing But the Truth (1941) as Steve Bennett
- Louisiana Purchase (1941) as Jim Taylor
- Star Spangled Rhythm (1942) as Bob Hope - Master of Ceremonies
- My Favorite Blonde (1942) as Larry Haines
- Road to Morocco (1942) as Orville 'Turkey' Jackson / Aunt Lucy
- They Got Me Covered (1943) as Robert Kittredge
- Let's Face It (1943) as Jerry Walker
- The Princess and the Pirate (1944) as Sylvester the Great
- The Story of G.I. Joe (1945) as voice on radio program; uncredited
- Road to Utopia (1946) as Chester Hooton
- Monsieur Beaucaire (1946) as Monsieur Beaucaire
- My Favorite Brunette (1947) as Ronnie Jackson
- Variety Girl (1947) as Bob Hope
- Where There's Life (1947) as Michael Joseph Valentine
- Road to Rio (1947) as Hot Lips Barton
- The Paleface (1948) as 'Painless' Peter Potter
- Sorrowful Jones (1949) as Humphrey 'Sorrowful' Jones
- The Great Lover (1949) as Freddie Hunter
- Fancy Pants (1950) as Humphrey
- The Lemon Drop Kid (1951) as Sidney Milburn aka The Lemon Drop Kid
- My Favorite Spy (1951) as Peanuts White / Eric Augustine
- The Greatest Show on Earth (1952) as Spectator (cameo, uncredited)
- Son of Paleface (1952) (as Peter Potter Jr.
- Road to Bali (1952) as Harold Gridley
- Off Limits (1953) as Wally Hogan
- Scared Stiff (1953) as Skeleton (cameo, uncredited)
- Here Come the Girls (1953) as Stanley Snodgrass
- Casanova's Big Night (1954) as Pippo Popolino
- The Seven Little Foys (1955) as Eddie Foy
- That Certain Feeling (1956) as Francis X. Dignan
- The Iron Petticoat (1956) as Major Charles "Chuck" Lockwood
- Beau James (1957) (with Vera Miles and as Mayor James J. 'Jimmy' Walker
- Paris Holiday (1958) as Robert Leslie Hunter
- The Geisha Boy (1958) as himself on TV (uncredited cameo)
- Alias Jesse James (1959) as Milford Farnsworth
- The Five Pennies (1959) as himself - Leaving Brown Derby Restaurant (uncredited) (cameo)
- The Facts of Life (1960) as Larry Gilbert
- Bachelor in Paradise (1961) as Adam J. Niles
- The Road to Hong Kong (1962) as Chester Babcock
- Critic's Choice (1963) as Parker Ballantine
- Call Me Bwana (1963) as Matt
- A Global Affair (1964) as Frank Larrimore
- I'll Take Sweden (1965) as Bob Holcomb
- The Oscar (1966) as himself (cameo, uncredited)
- Boy, Did I Get a Wrong Number! (1966) as Thomas J. 'Tom' Meade
- Not with My Wife, You Don't! (1966) as himself - USO Christmas Show (cameo, uncredited)
- Eight on the Lam (1967) as Henry Dimsdale
- The Private Navy of Sgt. O'Farrell (1968) as Sgt. Dan O'Farrell
- How to Commit Marriage (1969) as Frank Benson
- Cancel My Reservation (1972) as Dan Bartlett
- The Muppet Movie (1979) as Ice Cream Vendor (cameo)
- Spies Like Us (1985) as himself (cameo)
- A Masterpiece of Murder (1986, TV) as Dan Dolan

== Voice roles and documentaries ==
- The Simpsons (1992) (TV; "Lisa the Beauty Queen") – Himself; voice
- A Century of Cinema (1994) (Documentary)
- That Little Monster (1994) as himself (voice)
- Off the Menu: The Last Days of Chasen's (1997) (Documentary)

== Box office ranking ==
For a number of years Hope was ranked as one of the most popular stars in the world:

- 1941 – 4th (US)
- 1942 – 5th (US)
- 1943 – 2nd (US)
- 1944 – 3rd (US)
- 1945 – 7th (US)
- 1946 – 5th (US)
- 1947 – 6th (US)
- 1948 – 5th (US)
- 1949 – 1st (US)
- 1950 – 2nd (US), 1st (UK)
- 1951 – 6th (US), 1st (UK)
- 1952 – 5th (US), 1st (UK)
- 1953 – 8th (US)

== Portrayals ==
Hope was portrayed by Greg Kinnear in the 2020 comedy-drama film Misbehaviour about the Miss World 1970 Women's Liberation protests.
