= The Trouble with Angels (film) =

1966 film by Ida Lupino

- Theatrical release poster
- Directed by: Ida Lupino
- Written by: Blanche Hanalis
- Based on: Life with Mother Superior; 1962 memoir by Jane Trahey
- Produced by: William Frye
- Starring: Rosalind Russell; Hayley Mills; Binnie Barnes; Gypsy Rose Lee; Camilla Sparv; Mary Wickes; June Harding
- Cinematography: Lionel Lindon
- Edited by: Robert C. Jones
- Music by: Jerry Goldsmith
- Distributed by: Columbia Pictures
- Release date: March 30, 1966
- Running time: 112 minutes
- Country: United States
- Language: English
- Budget: $2 million
- Box office: $4.1 million (rentals)

The Trouble with Angels is a 1966 American comedy-drama film about the adventures of two girls in an all-girls Catholic school run by nuns. The film was the final theatrical feature to be directed by Ida Lupino and stars Hayley Mills (her first post-Disney film role), Rosalind Russell, and June Harding.

The film's cast includes Marge Redmond (who played a nun in the television series The Flying Nun, which premiered the following year) as math teacher Sister Liguori, Mary Wickes (who reprised her role in the sequel Where Angels Go, Trouble Follows and later played a nun in the film Sister Act and its sequel Sister Act 2: Back in the Habit) as gym teacher Sister Clarissa, and Portia Nelson (who played a nun in The Sound of Music the previous year) as art teacher Sister Elizabeth. Burlesque performer Gypsy Rose Lee appears in a small role. An uncredited Jim Hutton appears briefly as the principal of a competing school.

A sequel, Where Angels Go, Trouble Follows, starring Stella Stevens, was released in 1968, with Russell, Barnes, Wickes and Dolores Sutton all reprising their roles as nuns.

== Plot ==
In 1960s Pennsylvania, a group of girls meet on board a train that is heading for St. Francis Academy, a convent school. One of the girls, Mary, convinces the others to go along with a prank. Upon arrival, Reverend Mother is not amused and scolds Mary and Rachel, another one of the girls.

In an effort to make money, Mary and Rachel sneak fellow students into the cloisters for a tour. Reverend Mother punishes them with dish duty. Throughout the fall, the girls struggle with gym class, faking illnesses to avoid swimming. Frustrated, Rachel writes a letter to Mr. Petrie, the principal of her former school, complaining about St. Francis. The letter is intercepted, and she is assigned dish duty again. Inspired by the soap, Mary conceives of a new prank, adding bubble powder to the sugar bowls in the sisters' dining room. Reverend Mother sends Mary to chapel as punishment. While there, Mary shares a moment with one of the other nuns, Sister Ligouri.

After art class Mary wants to experiment with cement casting, recruiting her cousin Marvel-Ann as a model. It goes terribly wrong, and the nuns work for hours to free her from the casting. Mary and Rachel are put on dish duty one more time before the term break.

Later Mary and Rachel run into Reverend Mother while out for a walk. When Mary imitates Sister Ursula's accent, Reverend Mother tells the girls that Sister Ursula worked to hide Jewish children during the war and was captured. Mary is conflicted after hearing the story, and her feelings intensify when she looks out the window and notices Reverend Mother putting out food for the birds. Before Christmas, the girls are forced to volunteer their time at a retirement home holiday party. Mary struggles seeing the challenges the residents face as they grow old.

Bored during "Silent Sunday", Mary and Rachel sneak into the basement to smoke. The smoke wafts out the window and frightens Sister Prudence, who calls the fire department and sends the whole student body into a panic. Reverend Mother considers expelling the girls, but after meeting with Mary's absentee guardian, her Uncle George, she gives them another chance.

Next semester, Mary and Rachel join the band. When they sneak away from a class trip to spy on the New Trends band, Reverend Mother does not punish them as she can see their intentions are good, and they win the band competition.

When Marvel-Ann comes down with the mumps, Mary stays at school over Christmas break. She watches the sisters at Midnight Mass from the wings of the chapel and becomes inspired to join in worship. When Rachel returns from break, she struggles to finish her sewing class project and falls asleep in the classroom. As Reverend Mother finishes the dress, Mary sits with her and learns about her life and journey to the convent.

At their final swim class, the girls are forced to confront the fact that they have missed out on years of lessons, and they are sent to clean the attic as punishment for lying about their illnesses. While cleaning, they discover a goodbye gift for Sister Constance. Mary asks her about it, shocked that she would give up her vocation. Sister Constance explains that she will remain a nun, but she is moving to a leper colony in the Philippines to teach sick children. Later Mary cannot sleep, but she struggles to tell Rachel what is on her mind.

The girls are shocked to wake up and find out that Sister Ligiouri died in her sleep. Reverend Mother remains stoic, and Rachel accuses her of being cold, but Mary sneaks into the chapel to watch Reverend Mother's emotional goodbye.

On graduation day, Reverend Mother announces the names of the girls who are remaining at the convent to begin their novitiate, which includes Mary. Rachel is shocked at first, believing that Mary was brainwashed. With some nudging from Reverend Mother, the girls unite for a heartfelt goodbye, and Rachel accepts Mary's choice. Mary jokes that maybe Rachel will come back and join her, and Reverend Mother states “If she does, I quit.”

== Cast ==
The Nuns

- Rosalind Russell as the Mother Superior
- Binnie Barnes as Sister Celestine
- Camilla Sparv as Sister Constance
- Mary Wickes as Sister Clarissa
- Marge Redmond as Sister Liguori
- Dolores Sutton as Sister Rose Marie
- Margalo Gillmore as Sister Barbara
- Portia Nelson as Sister Elizabeth
- Marjorie Eaton as Sister Ursula
- Barbara Bell Wright as Sister Margaret
- Judith Lowry as Sister Prudence

The Girls

- Hayley Mills as Mary Clancy
- June Harding as Rachel Devery
- Barbara Hunter as Marvel-Ann
- Bernadette Withers as Valerie
- Vicky Albright as Charlotte
- Patty Gerrity as Sheila
- Vicki Draves as Kate
- Wendy Winkelman as Sandy
- Jewel Jaffe as Ginnie-Lou
- Gail Liddle as Priscilla
- Michael-Marie as Ruth
- Betty Jane Royale as Gladys
- Ronne Troup as Helen
- Catherine Wyles as Brigette

The Outsiders

- Gypsy Rose Lee as Mrs. Mabel Dowling Phipps
- Jim Boles as Mr. Gottschalk
- Kent Smith as Uncle George
- Pat McCaffrie as Mr. Devery
- Harry Harvey, Sr. as Mr. Grisson
- Mary Young as Mrs. Eldridge
- Jim Hutton as Mr. Petrie (uncredited)

== Life with Mother Superior ==
The Trouble with Angels was based on the 1962 book Life with Mother Superior by Jane Trahey, and it was about her own high school years at a Catholic school near Chicago in the 1930s. While in the memoir the school was portrayed as a boarding school outside the city, Trahey attended what is now Providence St. Mel School, which was a day school. Many of the incidents mentioned in the book were based on Trahey's experiences at Mundelein College in Chicago. The character of Mary Clancy (Mills), who came up with the "most scathingly brilliant ideas," was based on Jane's friend Mary, who later became Sister John Eudes Courtney, a Sinsinawa Dominican nun (1922–2017).

The Washington Post called it "wonderful fun". The book became a best seller.

== Production ==
=== Development ===
In June 1962, the film rights were purchased by Ken Donnellon and Jacqueline Babbin who knew Trahey in advertising. Donnellon said he wanted the film to be seen through the eyes of one of the young nuns.

They were unable to make the film. In August 1963 Ross Hunter was pursuing the novel; he wanted Loretta Young, Jane Wyman, Barbara Stanwyck and Virginia Grey to play nuns and Patty Duke and Mary Badham to play students.

In September 1964, the film rights were acquired by Columbia Pictures. The film was assigned to producer William Frye who had a multi-picture deal with the studio. Frye's original choice for the role of the Mother Superior was Greta Garbo, whose last film appearance was in 1941; Garbo rejected the producer's offer of $1 million to star in the film. In November 1964, Frye approached Hayley Mills to appear and she eventually signed on the following May. Ultimately, the role of the Mother Superior went to Rosalind Russell, who said "I have been around nuns my whole life and I wanted to do justice with them".

Frye hired Ida Lupino to direct; at the time, Lupino was mostly working on action and suspense programs for television and had not directed a predominantly female cast for a while. Lupino said "It's a change of pace".

=== Filming ===
Filming began in August 1965 under the title Mother Superior. The title was changed to The Trouble with Angels the following month out of fear there were too many other "nun" movies at the time (e.g. The Singing Nun).

"We are shooting it in color but the prevailing colors will be stark black and white and charcoal grey. Then there will be sudden slashes of bright color – a turquoise swimming pool, a green meadow. The possibilities of color are fantastic. And the picture will be warm and funny. And it's such a nice change – no blood spilled at all, darling", said Lupino.

The St. Francis Academy in the film was filmed on location at what was formerly known as St. Mary's Home for Children and is presently known as Lindenwold Castle in Ambler, Pennsylvania.

All interior shots were filmed at Columbia Studios at Sunset & Gower in Hollywood. Most exterior shots were filmed at the Greystone Mansion, which at the time was being leased by the City of Beverly Hills to the American Film Institute. The exterior track-side train/depot scenes (at the opening and closing of the movie) were shot at the former Atchison, Topeka, and Santa Fe Railway depot in Monrovia, California featuring ALCO PA's. The station is now a stop on the Metro A Line. However, the opening establishing shot of the train station was filmed at the Merion Train Station in Merion, Pennsylvania. The film was budgeted at $2 million.

Camilla Sparv made her debut as a nun.

Before shooting began, Rosalind Russell was asked by an old school friend, now a mother superior in St. Louis, to attend a fundraiser for a Catholic girls' school she was starting. Russell proposed that her upcoming film would be "the ideal fundraiser" and convinced Columbia to hold the premiere in St. Louis. The world premiere and a reception were held at St. Louis's Fox Theatre with ticket proceeds going to the school's building fund.

At the time of filming, Mills was age 19, and Harding was 28. Both characters would have aged from 14 to 17 during the three years covered in the plot.

In October 1965 Jerry Goldsmith signed to do the music. The animated titles were produced by DePatie–Freleng Enterprises.

== Reception ==
The film marked a departure for Mills, who was attempting to emerge from her juvenile leads in Walt Disney-produced teen comedies as a comedic actress. Her character was rebellious and seen smoking onscreen.

=== Critical ===
The Trouble with Angels enjoyed good reviews, but Variety was critical: "An appealing story idea—hip Mother Superior nun who outfoxes and matures two rebellious students in a Catholic girls' school—has lost impact via repetitious plotting and pacing, plus routine direction...Graduation finds Mills in character switcheroo to which Catholic audiences will long since be alerted".

=== Box office ===
The film earned enough box-office success to warrant a sequel (Where Angels Go, Trouble Follows). Russell said: "I think it proves there's a place for the family picture, the sort of picture you can take the kiddies to and which isn't pure corn". Filmink stated it proved "once again that Hayley Mills was box-office outside Disney." However she opted not to reprise her role as the progressive protagonist in the sequel, and she was replaced by Stella Stevens, who played Sister George, a new foil to Rosalind Russell's Mother Superior.

== See also ==
- List of American films of 1966
