= Where Angels Go, Trouble Follows =

1968 film by James Neilson

- Theatrical release poster
- Directed by: James Neilson
- Screenplay by: Blanche Hanalis
- Story by: Jane Trahey
- Produced by: William Frye
- Starring: Rosalind Russell; Stella Stevens; Binnie Barnes; Susan Saint James; Mary Wickes; Dolores Sutton; Milton Berle; Arthur Godfrey; Van Johnson; Robert Taylor
- Narrated by: Rosalind Russell
- Cinematography: Sam Leavitt
- Edited by: Adrienne Fazan
- Music by: Tommy Boyce; Bobby Hart; Lalo Schifrin
- Production company: Columbia Pictures
- Distributed by: Columbia Pictures
- Release date: April 10, 1968 (US)
- Running time: 94 minutes
- Country: United States
- Language: English
- Box office: $1.4 million (rentals)

Where Angels Go, Trouble Follows is a 1968 American comedy film directed by James Neilson and starring Rosalind Russell, Stella Stevens and Binnie Barnes. Written by Blanche Hanalis, the film is based on a story by Jane Trahey about an orthodox mother superior who is challenged by a progressive younger nun when they take the girls of St. Francis Academy on a bus trip across the United States. The film is a sequel to The Trouble with Angels (1966). Russell, Barnes, Mary Wickes and Dolores Sutton all reprise their roles as nuns from the original film.

== Plot ==
The conservative Mother Superior and the glamorous, progressive young Sister George shepherd a busload of Catholic high-school girls from Pennsylvania to an interfaith youth rally in California. As they debate expressions of faith and the role of the church during the tumultuous 1960s, they must also contend with the various antics of two rebellious, troublemaking students, Rosabelle and Marvel Anne. During their long drive to California, the group experiences fun in the amusement park and swimming pool, various difficulties including spending the night at an all-boys Catholic school, encountering hostile bikers and blundering onto an outdoor Western movie set, anachronistically ruining an important scene and reducing the excitable director (Milton Berle) to apoplexy.

== Cast ==
- Rosalind Russell as Mother Superior
- Stella Stevens as Sister George
- Milton Berle as Film Director
- Arthur Godfrey as The Bishop
- Van Johnson as Father Chase
- Robert Taylor as Mr. Farriday
- Binnie Barnes as Sister Celestine
- Mary Wickes as Sister Clarissa
- Dolores Sutton as Sister Rose-Marie
- Susan Saint James as Rosabelle
- Barbara Hunter as Marvel Ann
- Alice Rawlings as Patty
- Hilary Thompson as Hilarie
- Devon Douglas as Devon
- Ellen Moss as Tanya
- Cherie Lamour as Cherie
- June Fairchild as June
- William Lundigan as Mr. Clancy (bus donator)
- Alexandra Hay as Mr. Clancy's associate

== Production ==
=== Development ===
The film was announced in May 1967.

=== Casting ===
Along with Russell, the three featured nuns from The Trouble with Angels (Mary Wickes as Sister Clarissa, Binnie Barnes as Sister Celestine and Dolores Sutton as Sister Rose-Marie) returned for the sequel. Barbara Hunter also reprised her role as Marvel Anne, the cousin of Mary Clancy, Hayley Mills' character. The character of Sister George was originally written as Sister Mary Clancy, but after Mills declined to appear in the film, the part was rewritten. Susan Oliver and Connie Stevens were also considered for the role of Sister George. Where Angels Go, Trouble Follows features the penultimate film appearance of Robert Taylor; he died in June 1969 at age 57. Susan Saint James made an early film appearance, gaining her wider attention beyond television guest shots.

=== Filming locations ===
Principal photography began on July 17, 1967, in Philadelphia, where many scenes in the first half of the movie were filmed, including Market Street near 13th Street and City Hall, and a protest scene at the Philadelphia Museum of Art. Other scenes were filmed in the Lehigh Valley at Dorney Park and at St. Mary's Villa (Lindenwold Castle), a Catholic home for troubled youths on Bethlehem Pike in Ambler, Pennsylvania.

The Catholic boys boarding school where the group spends the night was actually Germantown Academy, about two miles (3.2 km) south of St. Mary's Villa. The church shown just prior to the boarding school is Ft. Washington Baptist Church, which is only about one mile (1.6 km) northeast of St. Mary's Villa.

The early scenes on the bus en route to California were filmed in nearby Fort Washington, Pennsylvania and along the Northeast Extension of the Pennsylvania Turnpike (Interstate 476, then known as Pennsylvania Route 9).

== Soundtrack ==
The theme song was written and performed by singer-songwriter duo Boyce and Hart. Composer Lalo Schifrin, best known for his work on the television series Mission: Impossible, collaborated with Boyce and Hart on the title song and supplied the incidental score.

- "Where Angels Go, Trouble Follows" (Schifrin, Boyce, and Hart) performed by Tommy Boyce and Bobby Hart – 1:59
- "Goodbye Baby (I Don't Want to See You Cry)" (Schifrin, Boyce, and Hart) performed by Tommy Boyce and Bobby Hart – 2:57

== Reception ==
In a contemporary review for The New York Times, critic Vincent Canby called the film a "cute-as-a-button comedy" and wrote: "Considering the apparent success of the original film, to say nothing of the immense popularity of other fantasies about nuns who fly and sing, there is probably a large audience waiting to be gulled into somnambulistic complacency by these new slapsticky and sentimental antics...The film must rely on the inventiveness of its comic situations and on the appeal of its players. The comedy, however, is strictly up-dated 'Junior Miss,' and the performances right out of Hollywood stock..."

== See also ==
- List of American films of 1968
