= Skutt =

The word Skutt may refer to:

- V. J. Skutt (1902–1993), president and chairman of Mutual of Omaha
- Thomas Skutt (1930–2000), president and chairman of Mutual of Omaha.
- V. J. and Angela Skutt Catholic High School
- Lille Skutt, a cartoon character; see Bamse.
- George Skutt, 17th-century English politician
