= Shaista Wahab =

Afghan writer

Dr. Shaista Wahab
- Born: Kabul, Afghanistan
- Education: Kabul University (history); University of Delhi (library science)
- Occupations: Librarian; Curator; Author
- Years active: 1981–present
- Employer: University of Nebraska at Omaha
- Known for: Curator of the Arthur Paul Afghanistan Collection
- Notable work: A Brief History of Afghanistan

Shaista Wahab is an Afghan writer. She has written Dari language books. Her book A Brief History of Afghanistan was published in 2007. Wahab was a librarian and professor at the University of Nebraska at Omaha where she coordinated the Arthur Paul Afghanistan Collection in the Dr. C.C. and Mabel L. Criss Library Archives & Special Collections. An oral history specialist, she served as a consultant to the Afghanistan Unveiled (2002–2003) film project by Independent Lens, which was later picked up by PBS.

== Early life and education ==
Wahab was born in Kabul, Afghanistan. She earned a degree in history from Kabul University and later a degree in library science from the University of Delhi. Following the Soviet invasion of Afghanistan in 1979, Wahab left the country and moved to Omaha, Nebraska, to join her sister, before she had any connection to the University of Nebraska at Omaha or its Afghanistan holdings.

== Career ==
=== Arthur Paul Afghanistan Collection ===
Wahab joined the staff of the University of Nebraska at Omaha library in October 1981 in a non-professional position and was subsequently promoted, over the course of her career, to the academic rank of professor. She went on to serve as both cataloger and curator of the Arthur Paul Afghanistan Collection, dividing her work between processing and cataloging material and assisting the students, faculty, and outside visitors – including foreign officials, writers, and researchers – who used the collection. By the mid-2000s the collection held more than 12,000 titles in 24 languages relating to Afghan history and culture, and by the following decade it was being described as the largest archive of Afghanistan-related material in the United States. Wahab, who is fluent in English and Persian, has been noted for her extensive knowledge of the collection's holdings and for guiding visiting researchers to relevant material.

=== Afghan Oral History Project ===
In the early 1980s, as growing numbers of Afghans arrived in the Omaha area following the Soviet invasion, Wahab launched what became known as the Afghan Oral History Project, aiming to record their personal accounts before their memories faded. With the support of the university library's administration, she wrote to Afghan and non-Afghan individuals whose lives had been affected by the invasion, inviting them to be interviewed, and a substantial number agreed to take part. The resulting recordings, totalling roughly 24 hours of interviews conducted in English, Pashto, and Dari, are held within the Arthur Paul Afghanistan Collection.

== Return to Afghanistan and Afghanistan Unveiled ==
In 2002, the Asia Foundation contacted Wahab about a program training a group of young Afghan women as journalists and camera operators at the AINA Afghan Media and Culture Center in Kabul, and asked her to travel to Afghanistan to teach the trainees oral-history interviewing techniques, drawing on her academic background in history and her earlier experience with the Afghan Oral History Project. It was her first visit to Afghanistan in 23 years. Over roughly a month, she worked with French filmmaker Brigitte Brault and the trainee journalists, traveling to five provinces and helping to gather about 65 interviews with Afghan women about their lives under and after Taliban rule. Because the trainees had rarely, if ever, left Kabul, Wahab and Brault spent considerable time meeting with the young women's families to secure permission for the trips into the provinces, at a time when no formal security accompanied the crews.

The interviews and footage gathered during the training formed the basis of the documentary Afghanistan Unveiled (2003), produced by AINA and broadcast in the United States on PBS's Independent Lens series in November 2004. Wahab later said she considered the project to have been a success, and remarked that the young women involved faced a difficult task in trying to bring about change, while expressing hope that they could serve as role models for other young Afghan women.

== Loya Jirga archive ==
In November 2003, the Asia Foundation again asked Wahab to travel to Afghanistan, this time to help organize the records generated by the Constitutional Loya Jirga, the assembly convened to ratify a new Afghan constitution; she was given about ten days' notice before departing. Over five weeks at the Loya Jirga site, held in tents near the Kabul Polytechnic Institute, Wahab organized citizens' letters and comments on the draft constitution, arranged access for delegates and journalists to current newspapers and legal documents, including earlier Afghan constitutions obtained from the Ministry of Justice, and coordinated photographic documentation of the proceedings. Before leaving, she also set up procedures for handling and preserving the different formats of material the archive had accumulated, including video recordings, compact discs, paper records, and photographs.

== Publications ==
In addition to A Brief History of Afghanistan, which Wahab co-authored with Barry Youngerman and which was first published in 2007, a second edition was issued in 2010 by Infobase Publishing.

Wahab also compiled a two-volume bibliography of the Arthur Paul Afghanistan Collection's holdings, covering Pashto- and Dari-language titles in the first volume and English- and European-language titles in the second.
