= Wild Kingdom =

American documentary television series

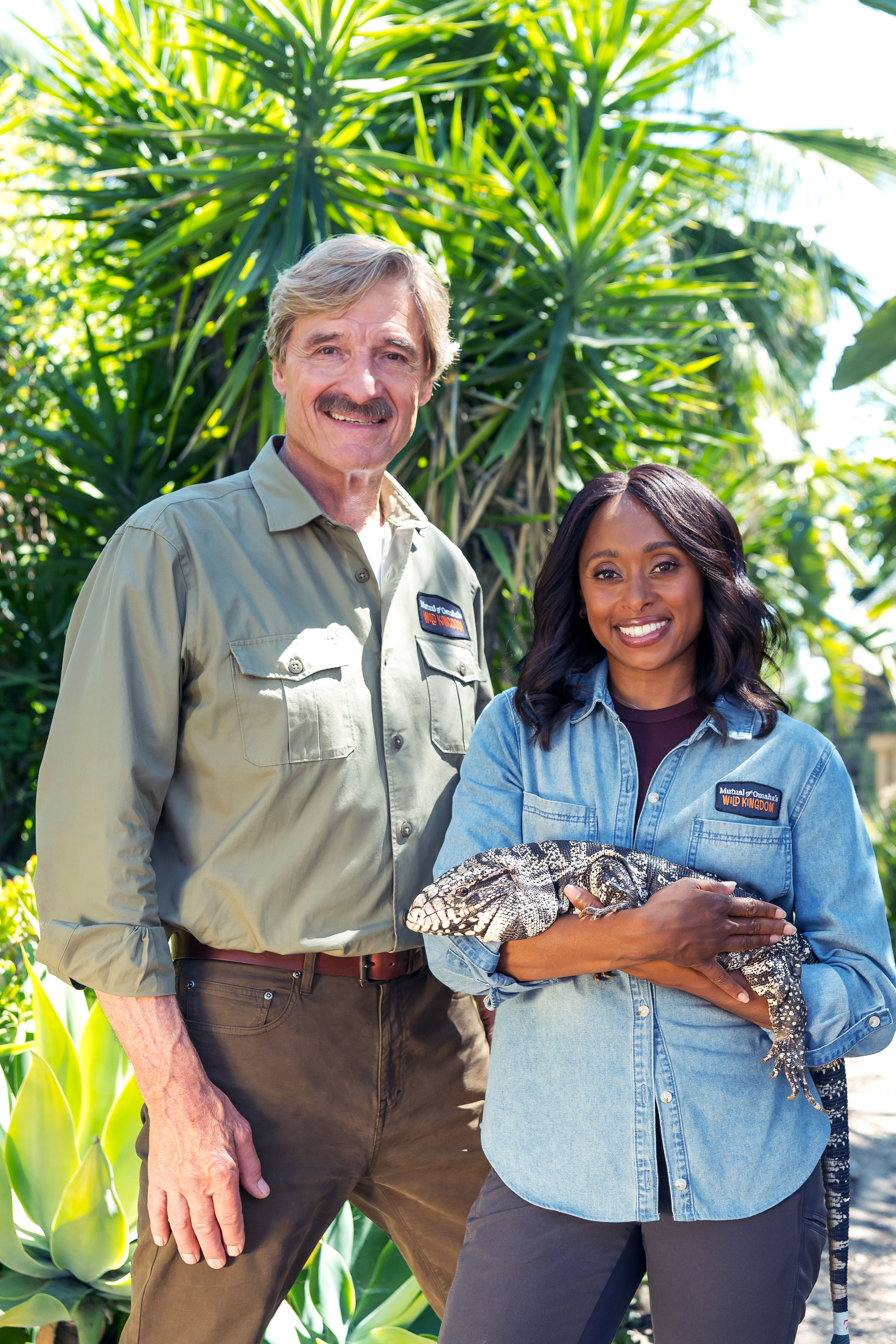
- Co-hosts Peter Gros and Dr. Rae Wynn-Grant
- Created by: Don Meier
- Starring: Marlin Perkins (1963–1985); Jim Fowler (co-host 1963–1985, host 1985–1988); Stan Brock (co-host 1968–1973); Stephanie Arne (2013–2018) Peter Gros (2023–present); Rae Wynn-Grant (2023–present)
- Narrated by: Marlin Perkins
- Music by: James Bourgeois; Dick Girvin; William Loose; Al Cobine
- Country of origin: United States
- No. of seasons: 18 (original TV program)
- No. of episodes: 140 (original TV program) (list of episodes)

Production
- Production companies: Don Meier Productions; Hearst Media Production Group (2023–present)

Original release
- Network: NBC
- Release: January 6, 1963 – 1971
- Network: Syndicated
- Release: 1971 – 1988
- Network: Animal Planet
- Release: September 17, 2002 – May 22, 2011
- Network: YouTube
- Release: November 3, 2013 – 2018
- Network: NBC
- Release: October 7, 2023 – present

Wild Kingdom, also known as Mutual of Omaha's Wild Kingdom, is an American documentary television program featuring wildlife and nature. It was originally produced from 1963 until 1988, and it was revived in 2002. The show's second incarnation aired until 2011 on Animal Planet in the United States. A third incarnation streamed webisodes on a dedicated YouTube channel from 2013 to 2018. A fourth incarnation, Mutual of Omaha's Wild Kingdom Protecting the Wild, hosted by Peter Gros & Dr. Rae Wynn-Grant, premiered on NBC as part of the network's Saturday morning The More You Know educational and informational programming block in October 2023.

== Overview of original program ==
The original Wild Kingdom grew from discussions that started in 1962 between zoologist Marlin Perkins and V. J. Skutt, the chairman and CEO of insurance company Mutual of Omaha. The company had been the sponsor of an earlier animal-related show, Zoo Parade, that Perkins had hosted from 1952 until 1957. Also intimately involved with the creation of Wild Kingdom was Zoo Parade producer Don Meier, who was credited as the program's creator. Mutual of Omaha sponsored and lent its name to the new program.

Wild Kingdom won Emmy Awards for "outstanding program achievement" in 1966, 1967, 1968, and 1969.

Liz and Henk Maartens, from Irene, Pretoria, South Africa, won five Emmy Awards for the documentary program Wild Kingdom in 1970. One Emmy Award was for camerawork, while the other Emmy Awards were for aspects of production.

Wild Kingdom was first broadcast by NBC. The half-hour show aired on Sundays starting January 6, 1963, and continued until 1971, when the program entered first-run syndication. As a prime-time syndicated program, Wild Kingdom enjoyed great popularity. Although most of the programs aired after 1971 were repeats, new shows continued to be produced until 1987. After syndication in 1971, the show received 41 major achievements. Some awards include the four Emmys from the National Academy of Arts and Sciences and the First Annual Communications Award from the National Wildlife Association. Several episodes were filmed by cameraman Roy Pinney. Perkins was the host for most of the show's history until he was forced to retire in 1985 for health reasons, and Jim Fowler, Perkins' long-time assistant and sidekick, became the host.

The format of the show often featured Perkins narrating off-camera, describing Fowler's on-camera work with the wild animals. This was commonly parodied as Perkins saying "I'll wait here [someplace safe] while Jim does something or other with the dangerous animal." However, according to a 1997 interview with Fowler, Perkins never said any such thing: according to Fowler, "Johnny Carson started the jokes about me and Marlin in his monologues."

Perkins often featured pet chimpanzees in the studio: one named "W. K." (Wild Kingdom); the other named "Mr. Moke", after the Mini Moke vehicle.

Wild Kingdom increased ecological and environmental awareness in the United States. Its exciting footage brought the wilds of Africa, the Amazon River, and other exotic locales into the living rooms of millions of Americans. It created an interest in commercial nature programming that led to several other wildlife documentary programs going on the air, including Animal World; Wild, Wild World of Animals; and Lorne Greene's New Wilderness, and in subsequent decades, to entire cable television networks devoted to these topics, such as the Discovery Channel and Animal Planet.

Mutual of Omaha owns the rights to the program, but several episodes have been released on DVD from BCI Eclipse under license from Mutual of Omaha. Some episodes are also available on the Wild Kingdom official YouTube channel.

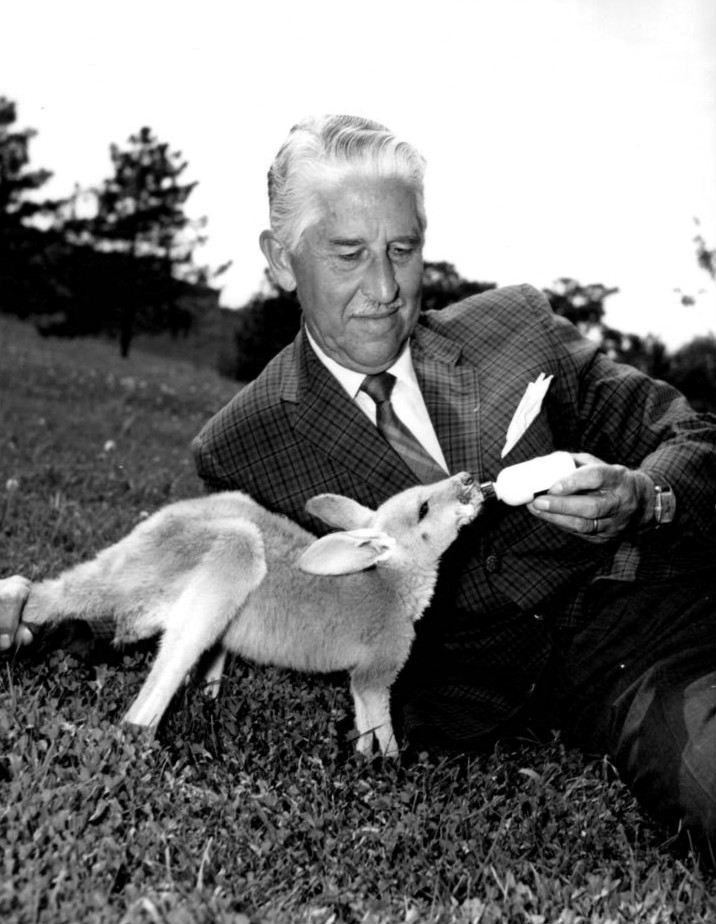
Marlin Perkins Wild Kingdom

== Controversy ==
The show came under heavy criticism in the 1982 investigative piece "Cruel Camera" by The Fifth Estate, a news magazine program on Canada's CBC Television network, for staging scenes of animal capture or "rescue" simply for dramatic effect or theatrical opportunity, which could thus be construed as cruelty or create undue risk to the creatures. Several interviewees who had worked on Wild Kingdom confirmed the rumors that many of the sequences were staged, such as in the episode where Perkins and crew captured a bear in the Florida swamps. In fact, the bear had actually been placed there for the production. Perkins denied such allegations on camera, and when interviewer Bob McKeown pressed him, said, ''I'd like you to stop your camera right now, please.'' Perkins then punched the reporter in the face.

== Reruns ==
As of April 4, 2021, Mutual of Omaha started syndicating the original series to RFD-TV, airing them in the original Sunday night time slot through 2022. The classic episodes are introduced by Peter Gros, named host of the fourth iteration in 2023. Starting July 6, 2025, a three-hour block of the classic episodes was presented on MeTV Sunday mornings at 7:00 AM ET/6:00 AM CT.

== Revivals ==
=== Second incarnation: 2002 revival ===
In 2002, a completely new Wild Kingdom, also sponsored by Mutual of Omaha, began airing new Wild Kingdom specials on Animal Planet. The specials proved to be so popular that, in 2005, the network began airing new weekly episodes during the original Sunday night timeslot.

=== Third incarnation: 2013 web series ===
On November 3, 2013, Mutual of Omaha's Wild Kingdom premiered as a series of webisodes that featured new host Stephanie Arne, a new format, and new stories.

1. "Reef Madness", featuring coral reefs of the Florida Keys.
2. "Where the Buffalo Roam", featuring American bison across the South Dakota plains.
3. "Tegu Invasion", featuring tegu in the Florida Everglades.
4. "California Condor: Extreme Survival", featuring the California condor's conservation success story.

A second season of new webisodes began in July 2014, and the third season began in March 2015. The fifth and last season was released in 2018.

=== Fourth incarnation: 2023 revival ===
On October 20, 2022, it was announced on the program's website and YouTube channel that a fourth incarnation—the third regular series revival—went into production with the title Mutual of Omaha's Wild Kingdom Protecting the Wild. This incarnation features new co-hosts: wildlife expert Peter Gros, who was part of the original Wild Kingdom series, and Dr. Rae Wynn-Grant, wildlife ecologist and science communicator.

The new series premiered in October 2023 on NBC and is produced by Hearst Media Production Group as part of the network's Saturday morning The More You Know educational and informational programming block. It is still being aired as of the 2026-27 season.
