= List of Wild Kingdom episodes =

Wild Kingdom was a wildlife documentary series that originally ran from 1963 to 1988.

== Series overview ==
Season	Episodes	Originally released	
Season	Episodes	First released	Last released
1	12	January 6, 1963	March 17, 1963
2	22	October 20, 1963	1964
3	8	18 October 1964	1964
4	5	October 17, 1965	1965
5	10	2 January 1966	1966
6	7	7 January 1968	1967
7	13	26 May 1968	1969
8	19	14 September 1969	1970
9	7	31 January 1971	1971
10	1	1972	
11	13	3 March 1974	1974
12	6	1974	1974
13	3	1975	1975
14	6	1976	1976
15	3	1977	1977
16	5	1978	1978
17	7	1978	1979
18	7	November 23, 1980	1980
19	6	1981	1981
20	6	October 31, 1982	1982
21	8	1983	1983
22	4	1984	1984
23	6	1985	1985
24	4	1986	1986
25	8	1987	1987

== Episodes ==
=== Season 1: 1963 ===
No.	Title	Original release date	Prod. code
1	"Designs for Survival"	January 6, 1963	S01E001
How adaptations help animals survive in their habitats
2	"Capturing Wild Animals"	January 13, 1963	S01E002
Trapping and capturing techniques
3	"Myths and Superstitions"	January 20, 1963	S01E003
Animal myths are investigated, including Ground Hog Day, snake charmers and Yeti tracks.
4	"The Amazon River"	January 27, 1963	S01E004
Marlin is on an expedition in the famous Amazon rainforest collecting animals for the Saint Louis zoo. Along the way, Marlin and his men meet the jaguar, anaconda and large insects of the Amazon River and rain forest.
5	"Attack and Defense"	February 3, 1963	S01E005
The tactics animals use to attack and defend themselves from enemies.
6	"Strange Ways of the Wild"	February 10, 1963	S01E006
Misinterpreted animal behavior
7	"Hunters of the Sky"	February 10, 1963	S01E007
The behavior and weapons of birds of prey
8	"Defense Against Extinction"	February 17, 1963	S01E008
Saving endangered species around the world.
9	"Sonar in the Wild"	February 24, 1963	S01E009
Bats and porpoises use sonar to navigate.
10	"Exploring the Reef"	March 3, 1963	S01E010
Undersea life
11	"Cats of the World"	March 10, 1963	S01E011
Many of the wild cats of the world including lions, tigers, and jaguars, along with pumas, bobcats, and margays are highlighted.
12	"Call of the Pribilofs"	March 17, 1963	S01E012
Fur seals migrate to four islands in the Bering Sea.

=== Season 2: 1963–1964 ===
No.	Title	Original release date	Prod. code
13	"The Miracle of Flight"	October 20, 1963	S02E013
An analysis of the miracle of flight.
14	"Danger: Wild Animals"	October 27, 1963	S02E014
Season premiere – Tactics of handling animals in the wild and captivity.
15	"Prairie Village"	November 3, 1963	S02E015
Urban life of prairie dogs
16	"Monkey Shines"	November 10, 1963	S02E016
Monkey intelligence is examined.
17	"Island Outposts"	November 17, 1963	S02E017
Wildlife from islands are featured, including Guadalupe, Madagascar, Isle Royale and Midway.
18	"Puma Pass"	November 24, 1963	S02E018
The mountains of western North America, home of cougars, are featured.
19	"Fact or Fallacy"	December 1, 1963	S02E019
Commonly held beliefs about animal behavior are examined.
20	"Strange But True"	December 8, 1963	S02E020
Oddities of the animal world are featured.
21	"The Amazon Jungle"	December 15, 1963	S02E021
The tropical rain forest supports life on all levels.
22	"Queen of the Everglades"	December 22, 1963	S02E022
How American alligators benefit other animals.
23	"King of Beasts"	February 29, 1964	S02E023
Lions
24	"Survival in the Sun"	January 5, 1964	S02E024
The adaptations of animals to desert conditions.
25	"Poles Apart"	January 12, 1964	S02E025
Many animals dwell in the wild kingdom that literally are 'poles apart' in structure, habits and adaptations
26	"Vanishing with the Wilderness"	January 19, 1964	S02E026
Marlin Perkins explores the why and hows of what happens to the creatures living in the wilderness when their natural habitat is destroyed
27	"The Kalahari"	January 26, 1964	S02E027
The native Bushmen people of the Kalahari Desert of western South Africa are visited.
28	"Crater of Gold"	February 2, 1964	S02E028
Marlin is in Africa in an area where rivers of fire and erupting volcanoes have created a crater called Ngora Ngora, which shields the great herds of African wildlife from the advances of humans.
29	"Chimp Antics"	TBA	TBA
Chimpanzees at the St. Louis Zoo perform acrobatic and musical feats.
30	"Command Performance"	TBA	TBA
Featured are the methods used for training animals, including lions and elephants.
31	"Miracle of Motion"	TBA	TBA
Oddities of animal motion include mammals that fly, birds that climb with their shoulders, lizards that dive and snakes that travel sideways.
32	"Expedition Geronimo"	TBA	TBA
Marlin, Jim and the crew of Marineland of the Pacific's capture ship Geronimo sail the seas in search of the strangest underwater creatures.
33	"Challenge to Survival"	TBA	TBA
Man finds excitement and action as he captures, tags and relocates animals all over the world because as civilization moves step by step into the wild kingdom, all forms of wildlife are forced to retreat until in many cases their survival is challenged. Man must meet this challenge and help animals survive.
34	"Winter in the Wild Kingdom"	TBA	TBA
A trip to the wild kingdom in winter highlights bulldogging elk from helicopters in the snow-covered Colorado mountains.

=== Season 3: 1964 ===
No.	Title	Original release date	Prod. code
35	"Land of Quaking Earth"	18 October 1964	S03E032
Season premiere. Animals of the Okefenokee swamp are spotlighted.
36	"Valley of Eagles"	TBA	S03E033
A valley in the mountain country of the western United States is the territory of the golden eagle.
37	"Sahara South"	TBA	S03E037
Marlin and Jim explore Africa's Sahara South and see how its inhabitants interact with their environment.
38	"The Philmont Trail"	TBA	S03E039
Marlin and Jim make a fascinating climb up the Philmont Trail with a troop of Explorer Scouts at the famous Boy Scout ranch near Cimarron in northern New Mexico.
39	"Strangest of All"	TBA	S03E041
A few of the many bizarre and strange animal behaviors that abound in the wild kingdom
40	"Animals That Time Forgot"	TBA	S03E044
Marlin and Jim explain how the smallest continent has become a land where time has stopped and everything is upside down in terms of evolution.
41	"Spotted Ghost Part I"	TBA	S03E044
Marlin and Jim are in the Kalahari, studying the life and behavior of a leopard.
42	"Spotted Ghost Part II"	TBA	S03E045
The continuing investigation of the leopard's home life.

=== Season 4: 1965 ===
No.	Title	Original release date	Prod. code
43	"South Through the Sonora"	October 17, 1965	TBA
Season Premiere. Marlin and Jim travel by jeep at the hottest time of the year to the rugged Sonora Desert in Arizona on a reptile collecting expedition.
44	"Bobcat Kingdom"	TBA	S04E052
Marlin and Jim observe a family of bobcats in the Zion Canyon area in the Utah wilderness.
45	"Mysteries of the Wild"	TBA	S04E055
Many mysteries of the wild present a challenge to seek the answer.
46	"Land of the Shadows"	TBA	S04E057
Deep in the forest of South America, Marlin and Jim journey through this twilight world to observe the many strange and beautiful creatures that inhabit this primitive forest.
47	"Okavango"	TBA	S04E059
Marlin and Jim explore the Okavango, a vast area of swamp and sand that is a haven for many animals of Africa where it's alive with animal activity.

=== Season 5: 1966 ===
No.	Title	Original release date	Prod. code
48	"Chacma Country Part I"	2 January 1966	TBA
Marlin and Jim visit South Africa to study and photograph the chacma baboons in their natural environment and to conduct some fascinating experiments.
49	"Chacma Country Part II"	30 January 1966	TBA
Marlin and Jim explore all of 'chacma country' from the lush coastal areas to the semi-desert interiors of South Africa where the baboons make their homes.
50	"Tigers of Sariska"	13 November 1966	TBA
Marlin goes unarmed deep into the jungles of India to film the adventures of a full-grown Bengal tigress and her two young cubs.
51	"Lions of Gir Forest"	18 December 1966	S05E064
Marlin travels to the Gir Forest in India to see the endangered Asiatic lions.
52	"Bundu Rescue"	5 February 1966	TBA
Marlin and Jim go on a thrilling adventure in South Africa to catch lions, hippos and elephants for scientific and conservation purposes.
53	"Where the Crocodile is King"	19 February 1967	S03E005
For Marlin and Jim, Africa's waters mean the chance to film the most exciting dramas and most unusual animals ever captured by the camera: crocodiles.
54	"Tale of the Fox"	TBA	S05E050
Marlin and Jim are in the North Woods of Wisconsin observing a family of red foxes.
55	"In Search of a Porpoise"	TBA	S03E067
Marlin is sailing the waters off the California coast in search of porpoises.
56	"Chincoteaque Roundup"	TBA	S03E073
Marlin and Jim journey to Assateague Island for the annual Swimming Chincoteaque Pony Roundup.
57	"El Tigre"	TBA	S03E076
Marlin and Jim are in the deserts of Mexico to help relocate a livestock killing jaguar and her cub to a more remote area away from livestock and guns.

=== Season 6: 1967 ===
No.	Title	Original release date	Prod. code
58	"To Catch a Giraffe"	7 January 1968	TBA
Marlin and Jim journey to Rhodesia to join in a game relocation project with the rangers of Wankie National Park. Two animals are on their list: a zebra and a giraffe.
59	"Strange Partnership"	TBA	S06E080
Examples of animal cooperation are highlighted
60	"Giants of Dadanawa"	TBA	S06E081
Marlin and Stan are at the Dadanawa Ranch in Guyana, studying the native animal giants there such as the giant anteater, tapir, and anaconda.
61	"Cheetah Country"	TBA	S06E084
In Rhodesia, a mother cheetah is taking care of four, fluffy cheetah cubs during their first week of life in this wild, unforgiving land, full of dangers.
62	"Tuskers Below"	February 23, 1969	S06E088
When Marlin Perkins and Jim Fowler set out to capture a baby elephant for temporary study, they run afoul of his indignant mama. Filmed in Kruger National Park in South Africa.
63	"Beneath Kilimanjaro"	TBA	S06E090
Marlin and Jim are in the Amboseli Game Reserve to find ways for coexistence of the wild animals and cattle herds.
64	"Leopards of Sawai Madipur"	TBA	S06E092
In Rajasthan in the Fort of Ranthambore, a family of leopards make their home. As the cubs grow, they explore the fortress and encounter many animals.

=== Season 7: 1969 ===
No.	Title	Original release date	Prod. code
65	"Lost World of Angel Falls"	26 May 1968	S06E16
Marlin and Stan fly into the remote interior of Venezuela to Angel Falls. It is a region so remote that it has often been called the Lost World.
66	"Hippo"	January 5, 1969	S07E103
Hosts Marlin Perkins, Jim Fowler and Stan Brock journey to South Africa's Kruger National Park to join rangers in a hippopotamus hunt to escort a young hippo to an area safe from poachers.
67	"Year of the Otter"	January 12, 1969	TBA
In a small Wisconsin lake, two otters are born and are followed through the first year of their lives.
68	"Sea Lion Number Seven"	January 19, 1969	S07E098
An interesting documentary on a tagged Steller sea lion pup, filmed by Marlin Perkins.
69	"Land of the Condor"	January 26, 1969	TBA
Marlin Perkins and Jim Fowler track giant condors in the Peruvian Andes. They hope to fit these marvelous soaring birds with tiny transmitters so scientists can learn about these solitary travelers.
70	"Return of the Salmon"	February 2, 1969	S07E100
In the chill, glacier-fed streams of Alaska, sockeye salmon are born and follow the current to the sea. After two or three great annual circuits of the North Pacific, the call comes to return.
71	"Exploring the Llanos"	February 9, 1969	TBA
This is about exploring the Llanos of South America, where hundreds of freshwater porpoises inhabit inland rivers and streams. Marlin Perkins, Jim Fowler, and Stan Brock join a rescue team to save porpoises trapped by receding waters.
72	"Experiment at Doddieburn"	March 2, 1969	TBA
Marlin Perkins and Stan Brock visit the Doddieburn Ranch in Rhodesia where experiments to domesticate wild animals are being conducted both as an important new food supply and to preserve the diminishing herds.
73	"Islands of the sea"	March 9, 1969	TBA
Marlin Perkins and Jim Fowler visit remote Pacific islands where sea lions are afraid of man on land but not in the water. They see Steller's sea lions and a battle between two large elephant seals.
74	"Chase by Copter"	March 16, 1969	TBA
Marlin Perkins and Jim Fowler visit Canada on two separate missions; a moose hunt and a goat tagging roundup.
75	"Bayou Backwaters"	March 30, 1969	TBA
Animal collecting in the enchanted Louisiana bayou country and tangles with a 12-foot alligator.
76	"Unwanted Cougar"	April 13, 1969	S07E101
Story of a yearling cougar filmed in Canada's Rockies.
77	"Lion Country"	TBA	S07E102
All about lions and how they interact with their environment and other animals.

=== Season 8: 1969–1970 ===
No.	Title	Original release date	Prod. code
78	"Operation Rescue: Part I"	14 September 1969	TBA
When the Guri Dam was built on the Caroni River in the wilderness of eastern Venezuela, it created a huge lake that flooded 500 square miles of prime wildlife habitat. Marlin, Jim and Stan help capture these stranded animals.
79	"Operation Rescue: Part II"	21 September 1969	TBA
In this second part, Marlin, Jim and Stan continue their work of testing animal capture systems as part of a follow-up team checking islands for animals that may have escaped the initial rescue teams.
80	"Voyage of the Golden Dolphin"	18 January 1970	TBA
Marlin and Stan join a capture team when they set sail aboard the collection ship the Golden Dolphin. Their expedition takes them to Guadalupe Island, round the tip of Baja California peninsula and into the Sea of Cortes observing elephant seals, sharks, manta ray and sea lions.
81	"Against the Clock"	June 28, 1970	S03E042
A study of the ways man has learned to measure the speed of animals.
82	"Lions Under the Net"	January 17, 1971	TBA
Marlin and Stan join rangers in Rhodesia in using the new capture method: The cannon net in capturing lions.
83	"Voyage to the Great Barrier Reef"	January 31, 1971	TBA
Marlin and Tom Allen join a voyage planned by Marineland of Australia to the Great Barrier Reef. 1
84	"Exploring the Great Barrier Reef"	February 7, 1971	TBA
Marlin and Tom Allen explore a giant coral head that juts up from the ocean floor. It is a treasure trove of underwater life.
85	"To Rope a Grizzly"	February 14, 1971	TBA
Marlin and Stan are invited to a ranch in the American west to capture a grizzly bear who was preying on livestock and the capture method is by using a lasso and roping the powerful and dangerous bear.
86	"Summer of the Badger"	TBA	S08E108
Set in the scenic country of the American west, this story follows two badger cubs from their birth in a prairie den.
87	"Wolf Pack"	TBA	S08E109
At a rendezvous near the Rocky Mountains near the Canadian border, a mother timberwolf is caring for her pups with help from the pack.
88	"Wildfire Part I"	TBA	S08E111
A forest fire raging out of control greets Marlin and Stan as they fly with the Forest Services smokejumpers in western Montana as they study the behavior of wildlife fleeing the inferno.
89	"Wildfire Part II"	TBA	S08E112
After days of steady winds, the wildfire has spread. Now Marlin and Stan trade their passive role of observation and attempt to save threatened animals.
90	"Rulers of the Kalahari"	TBA	S08E114
The Kalahari is home to three great hunters: The swift cheetah, the powerful lion, and the primitive Bushmen who make the Kalahari home.
91	"Moose Airlift"	TBA	TBA
Marlin is in Colorado to help airlift some moose in the mountains of Utah and reintroduce them to Colorado
92	"Exploring the Falklands"	TBA	TBA
Marlin journeys by boat to the cluster of the famous Falkland Islands off the southern coast of South America.
93	"Galana Experiment"	TBA	TBA
Marlin travels to Africa's Galana Ranch in Kenya to observe the roundup of wild herd animals which include eland, oryx and buffalo.
94	"The Sharks of Polynesia"	TBA	TBA
Dr. Nelson, an expert on the behavior of sharks and marine mammals, researches on Eniwetok Island.
95	"Desert Bighorns of Gypsum Canyon"	TBA	TBA
Marlin helps dart bighorn sheep from a helicopter along the Colorado River in the effort to transfer the sheep to the Henry Mountains on the other side of the river to increase their population.
96	"Vervets of Amboseli"	TBA	TBA
Marlin introduces Phyllis Lee who has been researching behavior on vervet monkeys in Kenya.

=== Season 9: 1971 ===
No.	Title	Original release date	Prod. code
97	"Voyage to Great Barrier Reef"	31 January 1971	TBA
Marlin and Tom Allen join a voyage planned by Marineland of Australia to the Great Barrier Reef, one of the world's natural wonders.
98	"Exploring the Great Barrier Reef"	7 February 1971	TBA
Marlin and Tom Allen explore a giant coral head that juts up from the ocean floor. It is a center of underwater life.
99	"Camels of the Outback"	TBA	TBA
Marlin and Tom are in the Australian Outback to help roundup feral camels as stock for zoos around the world.
100	"Chase of the Caribou"	TBA	S09E120
Marlin and Stan are participating in the most unusual capture of all that takes place in the deep snows of the far north, in pursuit of caribou.
101	"M'Bogo Safari"	TBA	S09E121
Marlin and Stan challenge the buffalo, "m'bogo" as the natives call him, as they take part in an unusual research project.
102	"Winter Comes to Cougar Country"	TBA	S09E123
Several cougar yearlings striving to survive the harsh winter in the mountains and escaping the principle predators of this high country.
103	"Roundup on the Outback"	TBA	S09E129
Marlin and Stan travel to Goodparla in Australia's Northern Territory to take part in a roundup of water buffalo.

=== Season 10: 1972 ===
No.	Title	Original release date	Prod. code
104	"Tiger Capture"	TBA	S10E132
Marlin and Tom Allen are invited to southern India to help move a large Bengal tiger which has become a threat to cattle herds.

=== Season 11: 1974 ===
No.	Title	Original release date	Prod. code
105	"Netting a Jaguar"	3 March 1974	TBA
Marlin and Stan help capture and relocate a jaguar in Mexico that threatens livestock.
106	"Coral Sea Night Dive"	TBA	S11E11
Marlin and Tom Allen join an Australian curator on an expedition to capture the most venomous snake in the world – at night along the Great Barrier Reef.
107	"A Day at Otter Hammock"	TBA	S11E11
There is a hammock in the Florida Everglades that is a small island of dry ground surrounded by boggy marshland which provides refuge and habitat for a multitude of wildlife.
108	"World of the Shark"	TBA	S11E144
Marlin and Tom Allen join scientists doing shark research in an undersea laboratory in the Bahamian waters.
109	"Under the Northern Ice"	TBA	S11E145
Marlin and Tom Allen continue intensive studies with Canadian experts both on the surface and under frigid waters of the adult seals as they swim along massive walls of blue-green ice.
110	"Flamingos of Lake Nakuru"	TBA	S11E150
Marlin joins Dr. Philip Kahl, an ornithologist, in Kenya's Great Rift Valley for close observations of the incredibly numerous populations of the greater and lesser flamingos for which this lake is famous.
111	"World of the Sea Otter"	TBA	S11E154
Marlin travels to the Pacific coast to observe some scientists conducting research on the sea otters.
112	"Adventure Above the Arctic Circle"	TBA	TBA
Marlin travels to Canada's Melville Island in the Arctic Ocean to study musk oxen and Peary caribou by using helicopters and small planes to penetrate deep into the Canadian mainland.
113	"Voyage Isles of Enchantment Part I"	TBA	TBA
Marlin and crew show us the wide variety of interesting animal life living on the Galapagos Islands lying 600 miles west of the coast of Ecuador.
114	"Voyage Isles of Enchantment Part II"	TBA	TBA
Marlin continues exploration by going underwater around the Galapagos observing the sea lions, crabs, marine iguanas, some sharks and specimens of octopus.
115	"Macaques of Japan"	TBA	TBA
A careful scientific study of Japanese macaques which live under conditions of climate more harsh than those endured by any other non-human primate.
116	"Migration of the Caribou"	TBA	TBA
Marlin observes the great migrating herd of caribou being urged northward on a migratory cycle of life while scientists tag the animals as they swim rivers in an effort to keep track of their travel habits.
117	"Search for the Angel Shark"	TBA	TBA
Divers using special underwater propulsion devices move the search of the seldom seen angel shark with Marlin operating from a Marineland laboratory ship over head and using a box-cage resting on the ocean floor.

=== Season 12: 1974 ===
No.	Title	Original release date	Prod. code
118	"Swans of the Red Rock Lake Part I"	TBA	S12E156
Filmed on location at Red Rock Lakes in Montana, this first program depicts beautiful trumpeter swans wintering on the lake and the observance and study of wintering animals on the shore including elk, moose, and coyotes.
119	"Swans of Red Rock Lakes Part II"	TBA	TBA
This is the conclusion of the story of efforts being made to save the almost extinct trumpeter swans in Montana by stepping up winter feeding and capturing and banding while the birds are in molt and unable to fly.
120	"Brink of Extinction"	TBA	S12E157
In the Peruvian Andes near an altitude of 14,000 feet Marlin and fellow scientists seek and study the endangered vicuna.
121	"Coyote Country"	TBA	S12E161
Filmed in the western United States, this species story is told without humans, of the coyote, its habits and life history.
122	"World of the Black Maned Lion"	TBA	TBA
This is the story about the rarely seen black maned lion.
123	"Operation Quickfind"	TBA	TBA
Marlin joins U.S. scientists in witnessing the training of sea lions, pilot whales and killer whales in doing emergency location work at great depths in the sea.

=== Season 13: 1975 ===
No.	Title	Original release date	Prod. code
124	"Call of the Whale Part I"	TBA	S13E168
Marlin and crew journey into the Caribbean near the Virgin Islands to study the endangered humpback whale.
125	"Call of the Whale Part II"	TBA	S13E169
The second part of the humpback whale story takes place near the Silver Navida Banks where the whales come to bear the young and the herds are tracked by helicopter. Marlin is underwater in much of this action.
126	"Bighorn"	TBA	TBA
Marlin visits a small mountain island in the middle of Flathead Lake in southern Montana – the home of a large herd of bighorn sheep.

=== Season 14: 1976 ===
No.	Title	Original release date	Prod. code
127	"Snake River Birds of Prey Part I"	TBA	S14E181
Along the Snake River in southwestern Idaho is the world's largest concentration of golden eagles and prairie falcons. Marlin participates in the research and observations of the raptors
128	"Snake River Birds of Prey Part II"	TBA	S14E182
Again Marlin participates in the study of the golden eagle as it nests in the canyon cliffs and hunts for food in the plateaus.
129	"Elk of the Montana Rockies"	TBA	S14E182
Marlin observes the study in operation during both winter and summer to learn what happens to elk of the Montana Rockies when forests are cut and logging roads built through their habitat.
130	"Dance of the Grebe Part I"	TBA	TBA
From the Delta Waterfowl Marsh near Canada's Lake Manitoba, Marlin presents an in-depth study of this unusual bird as witnessed from specially built blinds that resemble floating muskrat houses.
131	"Dance of the Grebes Part II"	TBA	TBA
Part II continues with more fascinating looks at the grebe's unusual behavior.
132	"To Rope A Shark"	TBA	TBA
Marlin joins men of Marineland of Australia to rope a large nurse shark.

=== Season 15: 1977 ===
No.	Title	Original release date	Prod. code
133	"The World of the Lapps Part I"	TBA	S15E192
This episode is about Norwegian natives and how they raise, herd and use their reindeer, which is the basis of their economy.
134	"The World of the Lapps Part II"	TBA	S15E193
Conclusion
135	"Chimpanzees of Tanzania"	TBA	S15E194
Marlin journeys to Tanzania to observe primate research being conducted among the chimpanzees that live near the shores of vast Lake Tanganyika.

=== Season 16: 1978 ===
No.	Title	Original release date	Prod. code
136	"A Girl Scout on Safari"	TBA	S16E208
Laura Grove, a Girl Scout from Milford, Nebraska, goes to Kenya with Jim Fowler to observe how women are instrumental in wildlife conservation in that country. Here, she also observes wildlife at Amboseli National Park at the base of the spectacular Mount Kilimanjaro.
137	"Gorillas of the Mountains, Part I"	TBA	TBA
All about Dr. Dian Fossey.
138	"Gorillas of the Mountains Part II"	TBA	TBA
The conclusion of Dian Fossey's work with mountain gorillas.
139	"Where the Winds are Born"	TBA	TBA
Marlin joins Dr. Ted Bank, II, in an underwater adventure searching the ancient undersea beaches of the Bering Sea land bridges of prehistoric times looking for evidence of the past habitation of man.
140	"The Remarkable Farallons"	TBA	TBA
Marlin documents this special research project done by Harriet Huber monitoring the drama of the territorial fights of the stellar sea lion bulls during the breeding season taking place on an island in the Pacific.

=== Season 17: 1978-1979 ===
No.	Title	Original release date	Prod. code
141	"Shark Pack of Eniwetok"	TBA	TBA
Marlin joins Dr. Nelson to attempt to determine what causes sharks to attack.
142	"Lemurs of Madagascar"	TBA	TBA
Lemurs evolved in many forms and colors in the antiquity of time and then stopped, but they still prevail. Madagascar has been called the Noah's Ark of ecological riches and it is the only place in the world where lemurs are found in the wild.
143	"Dilemma at Horicon"	TBA	TBA
Horicon Marsh, a Canada goose refuge, is too successful. Too many birds show up and depredate the crops of the farmers. Marlin observes the research work being done in an attempt to solve this problem.
144	"Women in the Wild Kingdom"	TBA	TBA
A special wildlife report on outstanding conservation research being done by three women in the wild kingdom.
145	"Wildlife Rancher"	TBA	S17E216
A special report on work being done by wildlife rancher, David Hopcraft, in an effort to save the wildlife of east Africa.
146	"First Winter of the Bobcat"	TBA	S17E217
This is a species story in which human beings are not involved. It is a story of a young bobcat facing his first winter on his own having been ousted by his mother.
147	"Expedition Seaquarium"	TBA	TBA
All about collecting fish and other marine species for aquariums.

=== Season 18: 1980 ===
No.	Title	Original release date	Prod. code
148	"Return to the Galapagos Part I"	November 23, 1980	TBA
Seven years later, Marlin returns to the Galapagos Islands in order to reflect on what changes, if any, have occurred. Is the wildlife increasing, remaining constant or declining.
149	"Return to the Galapagos Part II"	November 30, 1980	TBA
Conclusion
150	"Chimps of Gambia Part I"	TBA	S18E228
The story of a chimp named Lucy who was the first of her species to communicate with a human through use of sign language raised here in the States and then taken to the Gambia, West Africa for rehabilitation and release.
151	"Chimps of Gambia Part II"	TBA	S18E229
The end to Lucy's tale.
152	"Nuclear Research in the Wild Kingdom"	TBA	S18E229
Marlin visits the very first National Environmental Research Park near Akin, South Carolina, to observe studies being conducted to help answer questions about man's impact on the environment in this nuclear age.
153	"Land of the Birds of Paradise"	TBA	TBA
Perkins joins a research team from the New York Zoological Society for a journey to the Baiyer River Sanctuary in New Guinea to photograph the elusive but world-famous birds-of-paradise.
154	"Where Deer and Antelope Roam"	TBA	TBA
Perkins joins officials of the U.S. Fish and Wildlife Service in Wyoming where research is being done on what effect exploitation of mining resources might have on the wildlife.

=== Season 19: 1981 ===
No.	Title	Original release date	Prod. code
155	"Sleeping Bears of Kawishiwi"	TBA	S19E240
The study of the habits and movements of black bears in Minnesota during the winter when the bears are in hibernation is spotlighted
156	"Tracking Army Bobcats"	TBA	S19E250
A research project by the U.S. Army is centered around Fort Carson, Colorado, where bobcats are captured through the use of dogs and horse and then fitted with radio collars.
157	"Operation Genesis Part I"	TBA	TBA
Marlin travels to South Africa to an extinct volcanic crater where 148,000 acres of land are being returned to a natural state and reintroduce animals native to that area to make it look much as it did hundreds of years ago.
158	"Operation Genesis Part II"	TBA	TBA
In this exciting conclusion to this two-part episode, Marlin travels 1,000 miles in South Africa to help restore the last two species to the Pilanesberg Game Reserve: The springbok and white rhino.
159	"Lechwe of Kafue Flats"	TBA	TBA
Marlin journeys to do research for the first time to the central African country of Zambia where one of the largest remaining herds of lechwe makes their home.
160	"To Save the Condor"	TBA	TBA
Saving the California condor from extinction.

=== Season 20: 1982 ===
No.	Title	Original release date	Prod. code
161	"World of the Bleeding-Heart Baboon"	October 31, 1982	TBA
Wild Kingdom field reporter Johnathan Scott is in Ethiopia to tell all about the world of the gelada.
162	"Valley of the Beavers Part 1"	TBA	TBA
Showing the lives of a beaver family from spring until the middle of the following winter. The camera takes us beneath the surface of the pond and into the beaver lodge itself.
163	"Valley of the Beavers Part II"	TBA	S20E253
Conclusion
164	"When the Squid Return"	TBA	S20E261
In this episode, a place where squid return each year to an area in the Pacific Ocean off California coast to mate and deposit their eggs.
165	"The Unexplored Gran Chaco"	TBA	TBA
Marlin observes a project that identifies and inventories animals in Gran Chaco National Park in Paraguay.
166	"To Save the Moose Calves"	TBA	TBA
Jim Fowler joins the Canadian conservation officers in a research project in an attempt to learn why in recent years the mortality rate of moose calves is so high.

=== Season 21: 1983 ===
No.	Title	Original release date	Prod. code
167	"Guns That Save Wildlife"	TBA	S21E266
Marlin introduces two guns used to help save wildlife; one to inoculate animals and the other to capture them.
168	"Sharks of Blue Waters"	TBA	S21E274
Most dangerous scenes involve Jeremiah Sullivan and the testing of the metallic mesh anti-shark suit. Wearing this suit he provoked sharks into attacking him.
169	"The Unique Partnership"	TBA	S21E275
Marlin documents the story of a unique partnership between the U.S. Fish and Wildlife Service, universities, state fish and game agencies, and private organizations like the Wildlife Management Institute.
170	"The Ethiopian Experiment"	TBA	S21E21
Research being done in the Awash Valley of Ethiopia of the social behavior and the mating habits of two species of baboon: the hamadryas and the yellow
171	"To Collar a Swimming Moose"	TBA	S21E21
Jim Fowler is locating a moose in a lake where it is feeding and attempts to slip a noose around its neck.
172	"New Zealand Deer Lift Part 1"	TBA	TBA
Jim Fowler joins in the airlifting of the overly abundant red deer by helicopter out of an area so dense that choppers can't land. A dart-gun is used which tranquilize and at the same time attaches a tiny radio telemetry transmitter to the animal for tracking purposes. The deer is placed in a canvas bag and lifted to a large boat in a fjord nearby.
173	"New Zealand Deer Lift Part 2"	TBA	TBA
Part II takes Fowler to the remote snow-covered peaks of the Alp-like country where a special pair of net guns are used to capture more red deer. The deer are then transported to a farm and kept in dark pens for a time and released to mountain pastures and watched by a trained Border Collie dog.
174	"Operation Bighorn"	TBA	TBA
High above the Colorado River on the towering rock cliffs above the canyons of Utah the bighorn sheep thrive. Jim Fowler helps from a helicopter drive the sheep to the nearest valley and into nets to be airlifted out of these mountains to another area to establish new herds.

=== Season 22: 1984 ===
No.	Title	Original release date	Prod. code
175	"Waterholes of Etosha"	TBA	S22E282
In Namibia, near the vast Etosha pan lies a huge shallow waterhole where wildlife from miles around come to drink and also predators come to prey on the animals.
176	"Predators of the Marsh"	TBA	S22E284
A story about a beautiful marsh, at the base of a mountain range in the northwestern part of the U.S. where three great predators rule: the coyote, the bobcat, and the cougar.
177	"Exploring Dark Waters"	TBA	S22E284
The Great Barrier Reef in the Pacific Ocean off the Australian coast is visited at night by the underwater cameras of the Wild Kingdom crew to photo sharks, moray eels, sea snakes and other predators of the deep.
178	"Saving a Priceless Heritage Resource"	TBA	TBA
Wild ducks and geese are North America's priceless resource and must be protected for future generations – so this episode documents the beautiful mating rituals of the waterfowl, nesting activity of adult birds and the raising of young.

=== Season 23: 1985 ===
No.	Title	Original release date	Prod. code
179	"Plight of the Beggar Bears"	TBA	S23E288
In the U.S. and Canada the black bear has learned to live in close proximity with man which has to problems as they raid camps, open garbage cans and beg along busy highways. This behavior gives the impression they are tame and harmless which is not true.
180	"Dangerous Moments in the Wild Kingdom"	TBA	S23E295
Jim and Marlin reminisce about 23 years of traveling the world—participating in many exciting and dangerous projects.
181	"Memorable Moments in the Wild Kingdom"	TBA	S23E296
Jim and Marlin tell of many memorable moments in the Wild Kingdom from the desolation of the Antarctic; the capture of wild elephants in India and being on the Sea of Cortez the home of a school of 300 hammerhead sharks.
182	"Shark Attack"	TBA	TBA
Tom Allen, Bob Johnson and Jeremiah Sullivan marine biologists seek to determine the effectiveness of the new version of a steel mesh anti-shark suit against the attack of larger sharks, especially the awesome tiger shark.
183	"Polar Bears of the Pack Ice"	TBA	TBA
Jim Fowler joins Dr. Steve Amstrup to observe the impact on polar bears on the pack ice of the Arctic Ocean north of Alaska by the recent exploration of oil in that area.
184	"Shark Expedition"	TBA	TBA
Tom Allen, Bob Johnson and Dr. Samuel Gruber go on an expedition to further man's knowledge of the greatest predator in the sea -- the shark! The lemon and tiger sharks are the objects of interest that are captured and handled in this episode.

=== Season 24: 1986 ===
No.	Title	Original release date	Prod. code
185	"Operation Alligator"	TBA	S24E296
Jim Fowler and Peter Gros enter the bayous of Louisiana in the dark of night to capture alligators using a spotlight and their loop nooses to subdue the huge reptiles.
186	"On the Arctic Ice Pack"	TBA	S24E317
Near Barrow, Alaska, Jim Fowler and Peter Gros journey out onto the ice pack via helicopter and snowmobiles to observe two research projects in progress at Point Barrow. The study includes research being done on the ringed seals and the polar bears who depend upon these seals as their prey.
187	"Kangaroos of Broken Hill"	TBA	TBA
In the desert outback of Australia, Jim Fowler joins University of New South Wales wildlife biologist Dr. Terrence Dawson on a sheep ranch near the remote town of Broken Hill where a research project is being carried on to determine what degree of competition exists between the kangaroos and domestic sheep being introduced to the area.
188	"The Wild Waters of Clarion"	TBA	TBA
Every year for two weeks in November, following the hurricane season, a huge migration of marine animals occurs in the Pacific Ocean. Hordes of large sharks and giant manta rays migrate southward past Clarion Island. To learn the answer to this secret of the Pacific, Tom Allen and marine biologist Bob Johnson board the research vessel, Ambar III to reach the area and tag the large sharks and giant rays.

=== Season 25: 1987 ===
No.	Title	Original release date	Prod. code
189	"Where Geese Nest in Trees"	TBA	S25E318
Some Canada geese at Lee Metcalf National Wildlife Reserve in Montana have learned a unique method of protecting their nests, eggs and young from predators by building their nests atop nests built during previous seasons by ospreys in dead trees.
190	"Lions in Cabin #3"	TBA	S25E319
A special story takes place in the African country of Mozambique, taking place in a long-abandoned tourist camp in the vast Gorongosa National Park. In one of the buildings that is still intact, Cabin #3, some lions have taken up permanent occupancy. Here a lioness raises her cubs and teaches them to survive.
191	"Elephants of Lake Kariba"	TBA	S25E322
Jim Fowler and Peter Gros have an African adventure at Lake Kariba where they join members of the Zimbabwe Game Department in a project to capture and relocate elephants to establish new herds in areas where elephants once lived but have been exterminated.
192	"Return of the Giant Loggerheads"	TBA	S25E323
On Heron Island, offshore from Australia's northeastern coast, Peter Gros and Tom Allen join Colin Limpus to observe the work Limpus is doing to preserve the endangered giant 400-pound sea turtles known as loggerheads.
193	"Journey to Ubaigubi"	TBA	S25E326
Jim Fowler and Peter Gros embark on a rafting expedition down the perilous rapids of the Waghi River to the region of Ubaigubi where they closely observe the habits of several species of the winged gems of the New Guinea rainforests – the exotic, birds of paradise.
194	"Problem Bears of the North"	TBA	S25E327
Jim Fowler and Peter Gros journey together to the wilds of Manitoba along the northwest shore of Hudson Bay to observe the steps being taken by authorities to reduce a hazard posed by polar bears which annually congregate in the area of Cape Churchill as they wait for the great bay to freeze so they can go out on the ice to hunt seals.
195	"Computers for Ocean Predators"	TBA	TBA
A 10-foot shark in the Pacific; a giant octopus with tentacles stretching 16 feet and a giant wolf eel all are the marine animals captured and fitted with a device that emits a signal that activates the computerized recorder that has been developed to record the movements of sea creatures.
196	"Shark Doctor"	TBA	TBA
In this unusual show Tom Allen joins the "shark doctor" and a team of researchers aboard the Betsy-M out of the port of San Pedro, California, to do research on three different shark species they mean to capture by hand. Members of the team include marine biologist Bob Johnson, shark protection researcher Jeremiah Sullivan, and Dr. Stanley Spielman the shark doctor. The divers catch an angel shark from the bottom waters near Catalina Island and a blue shark in open waters 2,000 feet deep. They catch a mako shark at night. The object of the venture is to bring these hand-caught sharks to a testing station the men have established beneath the sea where the eyes of the captured sharks can be tested with electronic equipment to determine what importance vision plays to a shark in its predatory pursuits.
