= Clair Carlton Criss =

American businessman

- Born: 10 April 1879; Omaha, Nebraska, United States
- Died: 9 March 1952 (aged 72); Omaha, Nebraska, United States
- Occupation: Businessman
- Known for: Founder of Mutual of Omaha

Clair Carlton Criss (10 April 1879 – 9 March 1952) was an American businessman who developed the insurance company Mutual Benefit Health and Accident Association, later to become Mutual of Omaha. Under his leadership it grew from having 300 policyholders to become the largest company in the world that exclusively sold health and disability insurance.

== Early years ==
Clair Carlton Criss was born and raised in Sac City, Iowa. Mabel Leone Chambers was born in Cedar Rapids, Iowa, and moved several times. She went to high school in Pender, Thurston County, Nebraska.

Clair and Mabel married in 1901 in Wayne, Nebraska. They lived in Bloomfield, Nebraska where Clair managed a clothing store owned by his father. They had one child. Their son, who had always been sickly, died of a blood infection in Bloomfield in 1907. In 1908 the Crisses moved to Omaha. Clair studied medicine at the Creighton University medical school and graduated in 1912. To pay for his education he sold insurance.

== Origins of Mutual Benefit ==
The Mutual Benefit Health and Accident Association was founded in 1909 with a charter to sell insurance in Nebraska. By 1910 it had less than 300 insurance policies and was making few sales. At that time Mabel Criss was working as an independent stenographer for the company, while Clair Criss was studying at Creighton University and selling health and accident policies for another company. The founders asked Clair Criss for advice, and he told them to make their policies simpler, with broader coverage. When they hesitated to take this advice, the Crisses offered to buy the company for $300, which was accepted. Clair Criss completed his medical degree at Creighton University while the couple ran the insurance company. Clair took care of sales while Mabel ran the office.

== Growth ==
After practicing medicine for one year, Criss devoted all his energies to the company. Clair introduced innovations that other companies did not offer. The company sold health care policies that were not limited to fixed periods, and provided lifetime disability coverage for ordinary people. Clair joined community organizations such as Knights of Ak-Sar-Ben, the Benevolent and Protective Order of Elks and the Omaha Chamber of Commerce. Criss was elected president of Mutual Benefit Health and Accident Association in 1933. During his tenure Mutual Benefit became the largest company exclusively offering health and accident insurance. United Benefit Fire Insurance Company was formed in March 1947, with Criss as president.

Criss retired on 10 April 1949. On his retirement Criss was named chairman of Mutual Benefit and of its subsidiary United Benefit Life Insurance Company. V. J. Skutt succeeded Criss as president of Mutual Benefit. He renamed the company "Mutual of Omaha". Criss died at home in Omaha of a heart attack on 9 March 1952 after three years of poor health. He was chairman of the boards of directors of Companion Companies, Mutual Benefit and United Benefit.

== Legacy ==
After his death Mabel donated $7 million that, supplemented by federal grants and loans, was used to develop the Dr. C.C. and Mabel L. Criss Health Sciences Center at Creighton University The Criss's are also remembered by their names on the Dr. C.C. and Mabel L. Criss Library at the University of Nebraska Omaha and a seminar center in the University of Nebraska Medical Center's Durham Research Center. The Dr. C.C. and Mabel L. Criss Memorial Foundation is active and makes grants, but avoids publicity.

== Sources ==
- Champion of Excellence: Vestor Skutt, South Dakota Hall of Fame
- Dorr, Robert (28 November 1999), Dr. C. C. Criss and Mabel L. Criss, Omaha World-Herald (NE)
- "Dr. C. C. Criss Is Dead at 72", Evening World-Herald, Omaha, p. 24, 10 March 1952
- Generous couple helped Omaha grow great, University of Nebraska Foundation, 28 January 2013
- Kral, E. A. (2015), 900 Famous Nebraskans (PDF)
- Shaw, Jim (6 May 2015), What was Dr C C Criss's first two names?, University of Nebraska Omaha
