= Mutual of Omaha =

American insurance and financial company

Mutual of Omaha Insurance Company

- Mutual of Omaha Tower viewed from the north, August 2026
- Type: Private
- Industry: Finance, Insurance
- Founded: 1909; 117 years ago
- Headquarters: Mutual of Omaha Building, Omaha, Nebraska, U.S.
- Key people: James Blackledge (chairman of the board and CEO)
- Products: Life insurance Medicare supplement insurance Annuities; Long-term care insurance
- Revenue: ▲US$9.347 billion (2018)
- Net income: ▲US$277.3 million (2018)
- Total assets: ▲US$43.913.4 billion (2018)
- Total equity: ▲US$6.684 billion (2018)
- Number of employees: 6,314 (2018)
- Website: mutualofomaha.com

Mutual of Omaha Insurance Company is an American Fortune 500 mutual insurance and financial services company based in Omaha, Nebraska, United States. Founded in 1909, as Mutual Benefit Health & Accident Association, Mutual of Omaha is a financial organization offering a variety of insurance and financial products for individuals, businesses and groups throughout the United States.

The company provides a variety of financial services, including Medicare Supplement, life insurance, long-term care coverage and annuities, as well as group coverage including life, disability and 401(k).

== Subsidiaries ==
Mutual of Omaha has multiple subsidiaries including:

=== United of Omaha Life Insurance Company ===
Founded in 1909, this company provides life insurance, pension and annuity products for groups and individuals.

=== United World Life Insurance Company ===
Through direct marketing and independent agent networks, this company has offered health and accident coverage and specialty life plans since 1983.

=== Mutual of Omaha Investor Services, Inc. ===
Mutual funds are offered to individuals through the company's agents and Retirement Plans brokers.

=== East Campus Realty, LLC ===
East Campus Realty, LLC was established to develop Midtown Crossing at Turner Park, which is directly to the east of Mutual of Omaha's headquarters.

== History ==
Mutual of Omaha was founded in 1909 by a medical student at Omaha's Creighton University and his wife, Dr. C.C. Criss and Mabel Criss. It has grown into a Fortune 500 company offering insurance and financial solutions for individuals, businesses and groups throughout the United States.

In 1927, V. J. Skutt joined their team and was named president in 1949. With a license to sell insurance in all 48 states, an abbreviated name and distinctive Native American symbol, the company gained nationwide prominence in the 1950s.

In 1963, the company began sponsoring Mutual of Omaha's Wild Kingdom, a wildlife program hosted by Marlin Perkins and Jim Fowler that remained on television for more than 20 years. The company was one of the first companies to provide disability insurance to non-professional workers, and in 1966 was among the first companies to provide supplementary coverage for people enrolled in Medicare.

- March 5, 1909 – Mutual Benefit Health and Accident Association filed articles of incorporation with the Nebraska Insurance Department.
- 1920 – Premium income exceeded $1 million for the year.
- 1924 – Mutual of Omaha ranked 8th in comparison to other insurance companies.
- 1926 – The subsidiary, United Benefit Life Insurance Company, was founded.
- 1941 – The company founded its Group Insurance department.
- 1950 – Mutual Benefit Health & Accident Association changed its name to Mutual of Omaha Insurance Company.
- January 6, 1963 – Mutual of Omaha's Wild Kingdom premiered on network television. The original show was hosted by Marlin Perkins, Jim Fowler, and Peter Gros, and ran until 1988.
- 1974 - Slogan changed from "People who pay" to "People you can count on", through 2020.
- 1981 – United Benefit Life Insurance Company became United of Omaha.
- 2001 – The company revitalized its brand and began sponsoring USA Swimming.
- 2002 – A new Wild Kingdom series premiered on Animal Planet.
- 2005 – Daniel P. Neary is named chairman and chief executive officer.
- 2007 – Omaha Financial Holdings, Inc. was created as the parent company of Mutual of Omaha's banking initiatives.
- 2009 – Mutual of Omaha celebrates their 100th anniversary.
- 2015 – James T. Blackledge is named chief executive officer and elected to the board.
- 2016 – The company reaches $3 billion in policyholder surplus.
- 2018 – James T. Blackledge replaces Dan Neary as chairman of the board.
- 2019 – Agreed to sell Mutual of Omaha Bank to CIT's banking subsidiary, CIT Bank, N.A., for a purchase price of $1 billion.
- 2020 – The logo was changed from the Indian to a lion. The new slogan was: "Protect your kingdom".
- 2022 − Mutual of Omaha announced they would build their new headquarters in downtown Omaha on the site of the W. Dale Clark Library, with the under construction height making it the new tallest building in Omaha.

As of 2020, Mutual of Omaha holds the 300th rank on Fortune 500's top companies. The current CEO is James T. Blackledge. The company and its affiliates have more than 5,000 employees plus a network of sales advisors. The home office remains in Omaha, NE, with satellite or sales offices in most states. The company holds an A+ rating from A.M. Best and AA− rating from Standard & Poor's.

== Company governance ==
=== Chief Executive Officer ===
1964–1983	V. J. Skutt
1984–1996	Thomas Skutt
1998–2004	John Weekly
2005–2015	Dan Neary
2015–present	James Blackledge

=== Chairman of the Board ===
1949–1953	Dr. C.C. Criss
1953–1985	V.J. Skutt
1986–1996	Thomas Skutt
1998–2004	John Weekly
2005–2018	Dan Neary
2018–present	James Blackledge

=== Chief Financial Officer ===
Nov. 2025–present Brody Merrill

Sept. 2019-Nov 2025 Rick Hrabchak

== Recognition ==
- 2025 - Mutual of Omaha received an A+ rating from A.M. Best Company, Inc. for overall financial strength and ability to meet policy holder-related obligations.
- 2017 - Mutual of Omaha was ranked 5th of 18 large life insurance companies by NerdWallet.

== Wild Kingdom and professional golfing sponsorships ==
In 1963, Mutual of Omaha introduced a wildlife television program, Mutual of Omaha's Wild Kingdom. The original show ran from 1963 to 1988, and their toll-free phone number in that era was mentioned so frequently that many people still remember the number decades later, although it is no longer used by this company. The show has been since relaunched several times, with its current iteration running as a Saturday morning offering as part of NBC's The More You Know and produced by Hearst Media Production Group.

Vintage episodes of Wild Kingdom from the mid-1960s era, starring Marlin Perkins and featuring minor editorial updates, were added to the regular programming lineup on MeTV as of early 2026.

Mutual of Omaha sponsors 7 PGA Tour golfers and 2 LPGA golfers, including Russell Knox, Henrik Stenson, Pádraig Harrington, Paula Creamer, Jessica Korda, Bud Cauley, Brandon Hagy, Robby Shelton and David Leadbetter and Cameron Young.

== See also ==
- Midtown Omaha
- Economy of Omaha, Nebraska
- Mutual of Omaha Building
