= Dr. C.C. and Mabel L. Criss Library =

Library of the University of Nebraska Omaha

Coordinates: 41°15′30″N 96°0′41″W

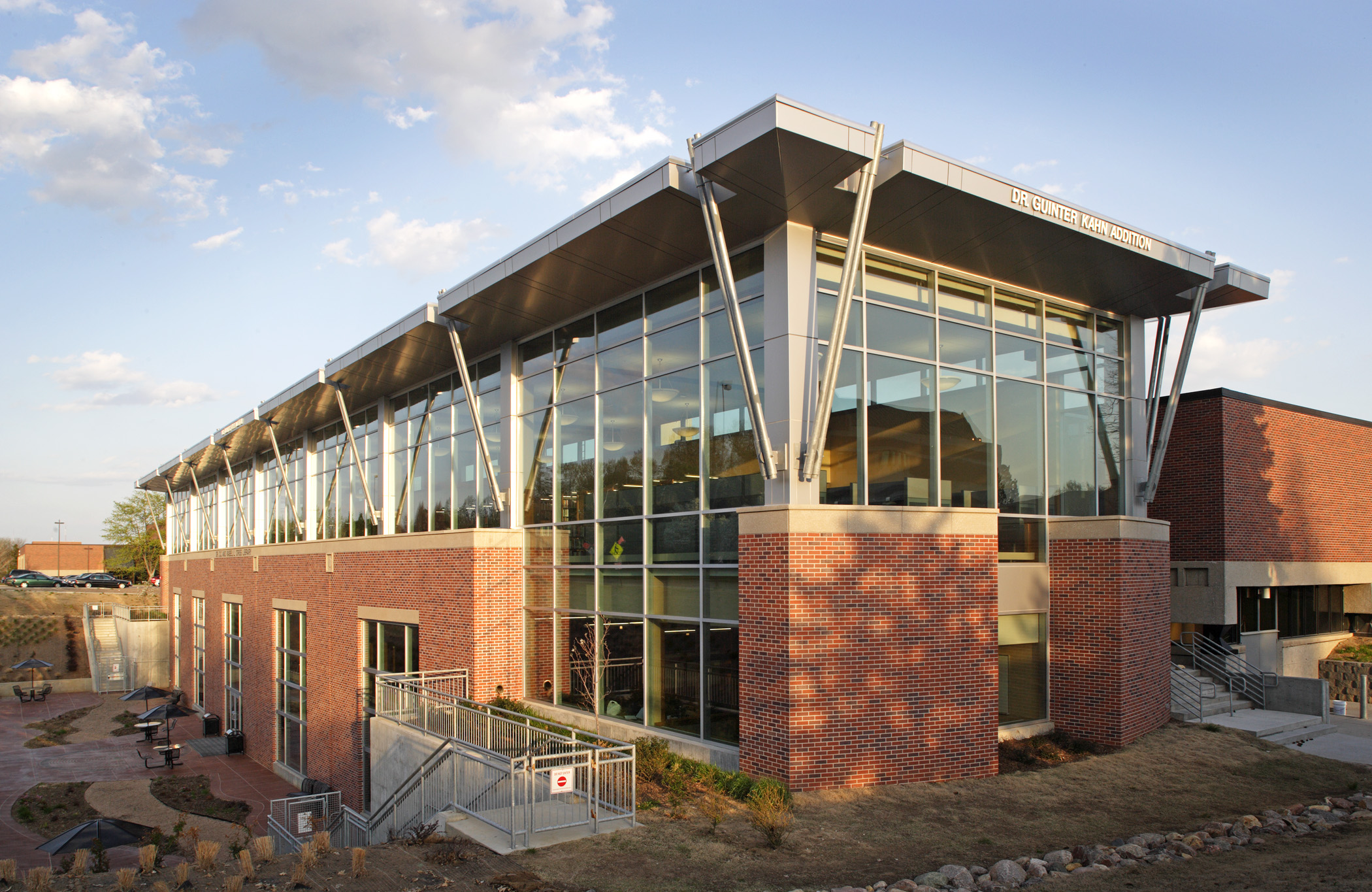
Kahn Addition

The Dr. C.C. and Mabel L. Criss Library is a library on the campus of the University of Nebraska Omaha (UNO).

== History ==
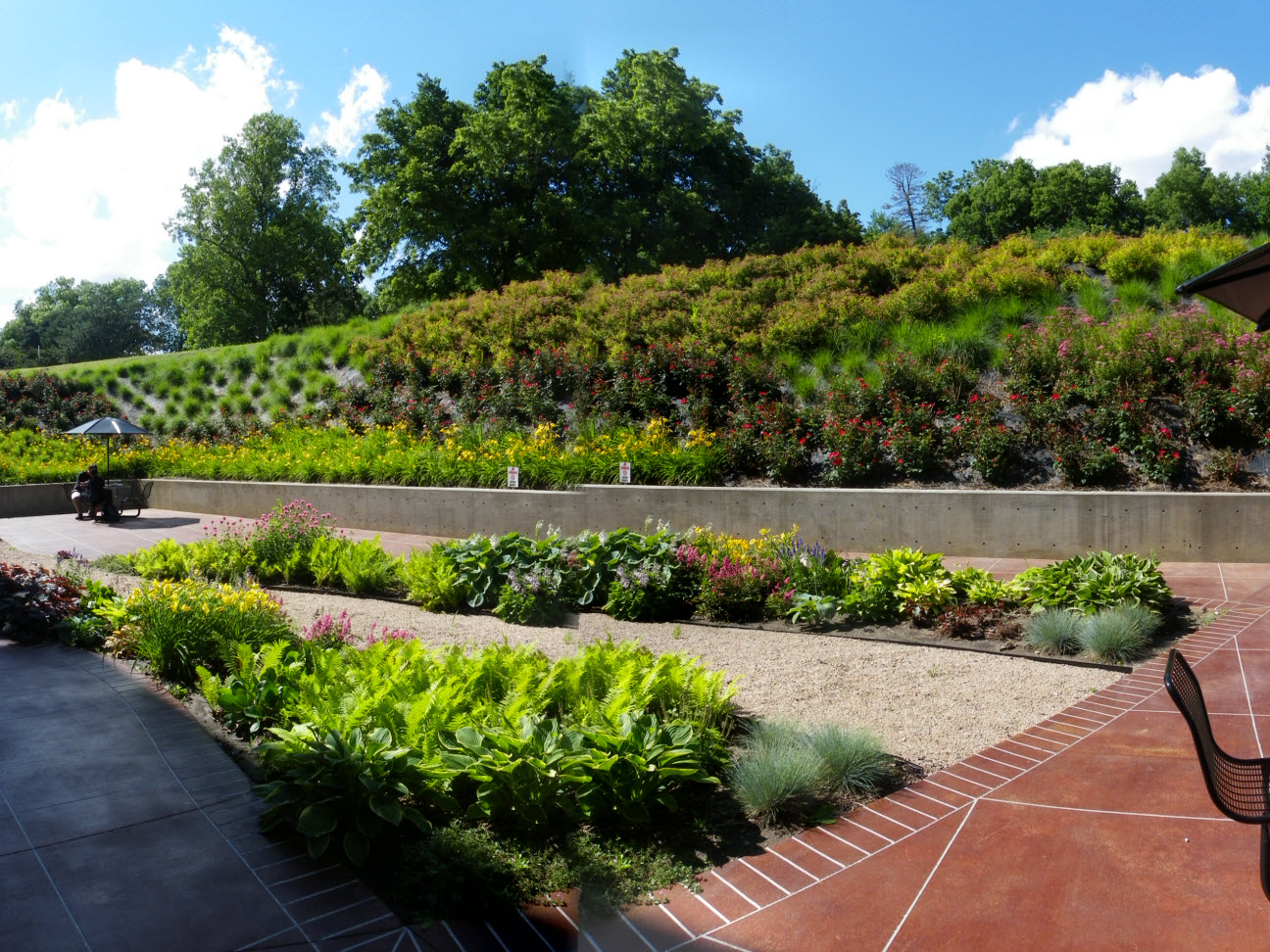
Marion E. and Barbara B. Tritsch Garden

In 1916, a formal library was established in Joslyn Hall on the original UNO campus, located at North 24th and Pratt Streets in North Omaha. By 1928, the library's collection had grown to over 5,000 volumes, which precipitated a move to a temporary location around 1930. The university moved from its North Omaha location in 1938 to its present location, and the library was relocated into the new Administration Building, which later became Arts and Sciences Hall.

In 1976, UNO built a Brutalist structure to house the library renamed in honor of Mutual of Omaha's founder, Dr. C.C. Criss and his wife, Mabel. Thirty years later, an expansion of the original building was undertaken by UNO. The Dr. Guinter Kahn Addition, completed in 2006, extended the north facade of the library building and added study areas and the Criss Library Cafe. A total renovation of the original 1976 library building during 2008–2009 provided more flexible gathering and research spaces. Several group and individual study rooms were added throughout the building, the Marion E. and Barbara B. Tritsch Garden was created on the lower level, and the H. Don and Connie J. Osborne Family Gallery was established on the main level, which hosts special gallery events and exhibits.

== Collections ==
The library's general collection includes over 700,000 books, over 71,000 journal titles, as well as a substantial number of U.S. government documents and Nebraska State documents. The library houses a number of special collections including University Archives, the papers of Senator Chuck Hagel, Queer Omaha Archives, Kripke-Veret Collection of the Jewish Federation, the Arthur Paul Afghanistan Collection, books from Icarians, Omaha Magical Society library, over 1,000 zines, and other unique and specialized collections.

The Arthur Paul Afghanistan Collection is the largest collection of Afghan materials held by a U.S. university, and one of the largest collections of Afghan research materials in the world. The collection contains over 20,000 items, including a number of rare documents, such as the illuminated/decorated manuscript of "Haft Aurang", and poems by Jami (1414–1492). In addition to onsite assistance, parts of the collection have been digitized and are available online. The collection is especially strong in 19th and early 20th century English language books by British authors conveying their personal experiences and the British Indian government's policy concerning Afghanistan.

== Art in Criss Library ==
Mel Ritsau mobile

UNO's Criss Library houses several original works of art by Nebraska and internationally known artists.

Recent acquisitions to the collection include a mobile by Mel Ritsau installed below the central skylight on the second floor/main level and first floor entrance at the end of the building renovation in 2009, and an untitled monumental head sculpture by Jun Kaneko added to the Kahn addition of the library in 2006.
