= V. J. and Angela Skutt Catholic High School =

Private coeducational school in Omaha, Nebraska

- Skutt Catholic

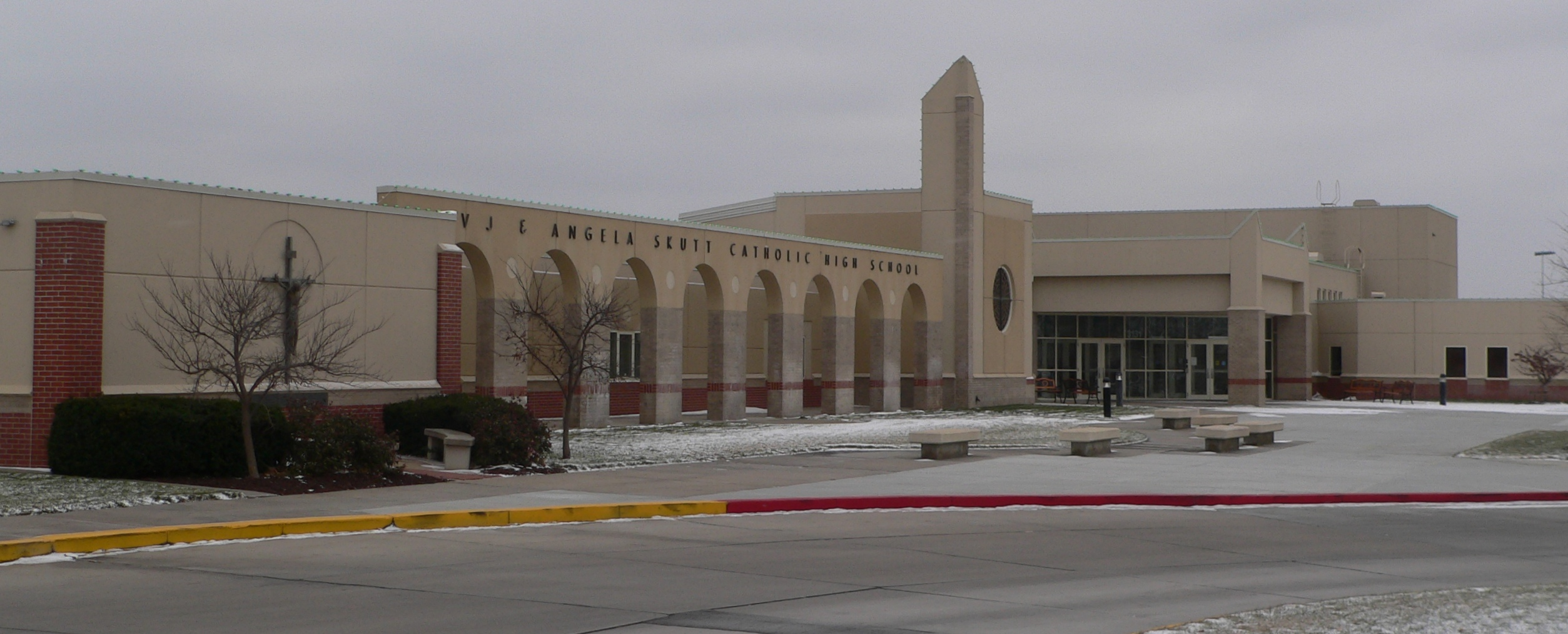

Location
- 3131 South 156th Street; Omaha, Douglas County, Nebraska 68130; United States; 41°13′47″N 96°9′23″W

Information
- Type: Private, coeducational
- Religious affiliation: Roman Catholic
- Established: 1993
- Superintendent: Fr. James Gilg
- Principal: Rob Meyers
- President: Jeremy Moore
- Chaplain: Fr. Patrick Harrison
- Grades: 9–12
- Gender: Coeducational
- Student to teacher ratio: 16:1
- Hours in school day: 8
- Campus: Suburban
- Campus size: 23 Acres
- Colors: Kelly green, black and Silver
- Slogan: "Make a Difference"
- Fight song: "Notre Dame Victory March"
- Athletics conference: River City Conference
- Mascot: Samson
- Team name: The SkyHawks
- Accreditation: North Central Association of Colleges and Schools
- Newspaper: Flightline
- Tuition: $10,300
- Admissions Director: Tim Bloomingdale
- Website: www.skuttcatholic.com

V.J. and Angela Skutt Catholic High School, located in Omaha, Nebraska, United States, is a Catholic, college-preparatory high school established in 1993. It was named in honor of V. J. Skutt, the longtime Chairman of Mutual of Omaha, and his wife Angela Skutt, who were prominent donors toward the school's construction. The school has a 1:16 teacher-student ratio. It is located in the Roman Catholic Archdiocese of Omaha. In 2012 and 2022, it was announced that the Suburban Omaha-based Catholic School was one of only 50 private schools nationally to earn the prestigious title of "Blue Ribbon School." In 2015, the school came under fire when it declined to renew gay teacher's contract after his marriage announcement. The issue spurred a Change.org petition that garnered over 100,000 signatures. The teacher left the school to teach elsewhere.

== Extracurricular activities ==
Every year the school hosts an "Angel Flight", a fundraising event. The school holds an All-Alumni Weekend for two days every July. It also hosts the Mr. SkyHawk Pageant, a drag event that pokes fun at beauty pageants. Other events include Hawktober, Powder Puff Football, Community Involvement Day, and Popsicle Day.

=== Athletics ===
School sports include baseball, basketball, bowling, cross country, football, golf, ice hockey, powerlifting, soccer, softball, swimming, tennis, track and field, trapshooting, volleyball, show choir, cheer, dance team, and wrestling, as well as intramurals. In 2009, Skutt made wrestling history with its 12th straight Class B wrestling title. On 19 November 2005, Skutt won the Class B 2005 football title, versus the McCook Bison. Other Skutt teams winning Class B State Championships in 2005–2006, included wrestling, boys basketball, girls soccer, girls tennis, and boys golf. Skutt Catholic had also won the class B state wrestling title for 13 years running, as of 2010 (a Nebraska state record). Skutt Catholic has had second-place finishes in powerlifting, but has yet to win the title. The Skutt Catholic dance team has won state championships for six years in a row. The basketball team has won the state title game.

=== State championships ===
State championships
Season	Sport/activity	Number of championships	Year					
Fall	Football	5	2005, 2013, 2014, 2018, 2019					
Fall	Softball	4	2011, 2013, 2020, 2021					
Fall	Cross Country	3	2017, 2018, 2019					
Tennis, boys'	1	2004						
Winter	Wrestling	21	1998, 1999, 2000, 2001, 2002, 2003, 2004, 2005, 2006, 2007, 2008, 2009, 2010, 2012, 2013, 2014, 2015 2016, 2017, 2018, 2023					
Winter	Basketball, boys'	6	2006, 2007, 2014, 2020, 2023, 2024	Volleyball |9| |2015, 2016, 2017, 2018, 2019, 2020, 2021, 2022, 2023	Spring	Golf, boys'	1	2006
Soccer, boys'	9	2003, 2004, 2007, 2008, 2012, 2019, 2021, 2022, 2023			Spring			
Soccer, girls'	10	2006, 2009, 2010, 2011, 2013, 2016, 2017, 2021, 2022, 2023			Spring			
Baseball	1	2017			Spring			
Tennis, girls'	9	2002, 2006, 2007, 2008, 2009, 2010, 2012, 2013, 2014			Spring			
Journalism	1	2015			Spring			
Speech	4	2012, 2013, 2014, 2015			Spring			
Total		'74						

== Notable alumni ==
- Tony Schmitz (Class of 2004), selected in the 2008 MLS SuperDraft by four time MLS Cup Champion D.C. United
- Thomas Gilman (Class of 2012) 3x NCAA Wrestling All American from the University of Iowa. 2x Senior World Team member and World Silver Medalist
- Rachel Balkovec, minor league baseball coach
- Jared Epperson (Class of 2020), Augustana University Running Back, NSIC (Northern Sun Intercollegiate Conference) 2024 Offensive Player of the Year
