= V. J. Skutt =

Omaha, Nebraska, businessman

- Born: Vestor Joseph Skutt; February 24, 1902; Deadwood, South Dakota, U.S.
- Died: February 23, 1993 (aged 90); Omaha, Nebraska, U.S.
- Occupation(s): Attorney, business executive
- Known for: CEO of Mutual of Omaha
- Spouse: Angela Anderson (m. 1926; died 1990)
- Children: 3, including Thomas

Vestor Joseph Skutt (February 24, 1902 – February 23, 1993) was an American attorney who was president and chairman of Mutual of Omaha for many years. During his tenure the company became the largest individual health insurance provider in the United States.

== Early years ==
Vestor Joseph Skutt was born in Deadwood, South Dakota, on 24 February 1902. He grew up in Sturgis, South Dakota, where he attended St. Martin's Academy and Sturgis Public High School. He graduated from high school in 1919 and attended Creighton University in Omaha, Nebraska, graduating with a degree in law in 1923. In 1924 he was hired as an attorney by Mutual Benefit Health and Accident Association in Omaha. He worked on design and development of insurance products, and rose steadily through the corporate hierarchy. In 1926 he married Angela M. Anderson (1904–1990). Their son Thomas James Skutt was born in 1930. Their other children were Sally Jane Desmond and Donald Joseph Skutt, who died in 1985.

== Head of Mutual of Omaha ==
The company president Dr. Clair Carlton Criss retired due to poor health on 10 April 1949, and Skutt was elected president on 14 April 1949. He renamed the company "Mutual of Omaha". In 1953 he was named chairman of the board and president of Mutual of Omaha. In 1963 he also became chairman of the board and chief executive officer of the affiliated life insurance company, United of Omaha. He expanded the scope of the two companies, forming affiliates such as Mutual of Omaha Fund Management Company and Companion Life Insurance Company of New York. During the time that he headed the organization it grew from earning premiums of $76 million annually to become the largest individual health insurance provider in the United States. At the time of his death Mutual of Omaha had 5,800 employees and was the largest private employer in Nebraska.

Skutt demanded that claims be paid quickly and fairly. Under his leadership the company became the first to offer coverage to people aged 65 or more, and the first to offer national coverage regardless of an individual's health condition. He founded the Mutual of Omaha Crisis Award for people who had contributed to health, safety and public welfare. In 1963 the company began to sponsor the Mutual of Omaha's Wild Kingdom television program, a family-oriented program that promoted conservation. Skutt also supported the Henry Doorly Zoo in Omaha, and his family and the company funded construction of the educational center at the zoo. Skutt received many honors for his business leadership. In 1966 he was named chairman of National Brotherhood Week by the National Conference of Christians and Jews. In 1976 he received the Golden Plate Award of the American Academy of Achievement.

== Last years and legacy ==
In 1986 Skutt became chairman emeritus of Mutual of Omaha. His son, Tom Skutt, succeeded him as chairman of the board. Skutt died on 23 February 1993 after a 69-year career with Mutual of Omaha. He died in Omaha, Nebraska, and was buried in the Calvary Cemetery in that city. In 1990 the Catholic Archdiocese of Omaha had decided to build a new co-educational high school on the western edge of Omaha. It opened in August 1993, named Skutt Catholic in honor of V.J. and Angela Skutt, who had done much to support Catholic education in Omaha.

== Sources ==
- Champion of Excellence: Vestor Skutt, South Dakota Hall of Fame
- Former Mutual of Omaha chairman, V.J. Skutt, dies at age 90, United Press International, 24 February 1993
- "Golden Plate Awardees: Business", www.achievement.org, Academy of Achievement
- History, Skutt Catholic High School
- Timeline, Mutual of Omaha Insurance Company
- V. J. Skutt Named Chairman of National Brotherhood Week for 1966, Jewish Telegraphic Agency, 1 December 1965
- "Vestor Joseph "V J" Skutt", Find a Grave
