= Thomas Skutt =

Thomas James Skutt
- Born: 1 November 1930; Omaha, Nebraska, US
- Died: 29 May 2000 (aged 69); Omaha, Nebraska, US
- Occupations: Lawyer, executive
- Known for: Chairman of Mutual of Omaha

Thomas James Skutt (1 November 1930 – 29 May 2000) was an American insurance executive who served as chairman of Mutual of Omaha from 1986 to 1998.

== Early years ==
Thomas James Skutt was born on 1 November 1930 in Omaha, Nebraska. His parents were V. J. Skutt (1902–1993) and Angela M. (Anderson) Skutt (1904–1990). He grew up in Omaha. He studied at Yale University and earned a bachelor's degree there in 1952. In the early 1950s he served as an army lieutenant in Korea. He married Jeanne Cecille Plunkett (1932–2017) in 1955. They had two daughters and a son. He studied at Creighton University in Omaha, where he received a degree in law in 1957.

== Mutual of Omaha ==
Skutt joined Mutual of Omaha in 1969 as a secretary and tax counsel. In 1984 he succeeded his father as the company's chief executive. In 1986 he again succeeded his father and became chairman. During his tenure the company expanded its range of products and expanded into new markets. He retired in 1998. He suffered a cerebral hemorrhage and died at Methodist Hospital in Omaha. Skutt died on 29 May 2000 in Omaha, and was buried in the Calvary Cemetery, Omaha.

== Sources ==
- "Thomas James Skutt", Find a Grave
- "Thomas Skutt, 69, Mutual of Omaha Chief", The New York Times, 1 June 2000
