= 1984–85 United States network television schedule =

US primetime television schedule for the fall of 1984

The 1984–85 network television schedule for the three major English language commercial broadcast networks in the United States covers primetime hours from September 1984 through August 1985. The schedule is followed by a list per network of returning series, new series, and series cancelled after the 1983–84 season.

Halfway through the season, NBC began airing some of its prime-time programming in MTS stereo sound. The network had aired The Tonight Show Starring Johnny Carson and some specials in this format since the summer of 1984.

PBS, the Public Broadcasting Service, was in operation but the schedule was set by each local station.

Each of the 30 highest-rated shows released in May 1985 is listed with its rank and rating as determined by Nielsen Media Research.

== Legend ==
- Light blue indicates local programming.
- Gray indicates encore programming.
- Blue-gray indicates news programming.
- Light green indicates sporting events.
- Red indicates series being burned off and other irregularly scheduled programs, including specials and movies.
- Light gold indicates programming produced outside of the United States.
- highlight Lime highlights indicates the number-one most watched program of the season.
- highlight Yellow highlights indicates the top-10 most watched programs of the season.
- highlight Cyan highlights indicates numbers 11-20 most watched programs of the season.
- highlight Magenta highlights indicates numbers 21-30 most watched programs of the season.
- highlight Highlights indicates that it falls in multiple of the above categories.

== Schedule ==
- The fall schedule runs from September to November 1984, the winter schedule runs from December 1984 to February 1985, the spring schedule runs from March to May 1985 and the summer schedule runs from June to August 1985.
- New series are highlighted in **bold**.
- Repeat airings or same-day rebroadcasts are indicated by **(R)**.
- All times are U.S. Eastern and Pacific Time (except for some live sports or events). Subtract one hour for Central, Mountain, Alaska and Hawaii–Aleutian times.

=== Sunday ===
Network		7:00 p.m.	7:30 p.m.	8:00 p.m.	8:30 p.m.	9:00 p.m.	9:30 p.m.	10:00 p.m.	10:30 p.m.
ABC	Fall	Ripley's Believe It or Not!		Hardcastle and McCormick		The ABC Sunday Night Movie (21/17.5)			
ABC	Late fall	Ripley's Believe It or Not!		The ABC Sunday Night Movie (21/17.5) / Specials / Miniseries (Note: Beginning December 16, ABC's Sunday schedule between 8:00 p.m. and 11:00 p.m. varied, consisting of three-hour broadcasts of The ABC Sunday Night Movie, 2 1/2 hour broadcasts of the ABC Sunday Night Movie airing at 8:00 p.m., followed by sitcom repeats at 10:30 p.m., two-hour broadcasts of The ABC Sunday Night Movie starting at 8:00 p.m. with various repeats or specials airing at 10:00 p.m., specials airing at 8:00 p.m. followed by a miniseries or a two-hour broadcast of The ABC Sunday Night Movie starting at 9:00 p.m., or miniseries, specials or sports programming during the entire three-hour block.)					
CBS	Fall	60 Minutes (4/22.2)		**Murder, She Wrote** (8/20.1)		The Jeffersons	Alice	Trapper John, M.D. (29/16.8)	
CBS	Winter	60 Minutes (4/22.2)		**Murder, She Wrote** (8/20.1)		**Crazy Like a Fox** (10/19.9) (Tied with Falcon Crest)		Trapper John, M.D. (29/16.8)	
NBC	Fall	Silver Spoons	**Punky Brewster**	Knight Rider		NBC Sunday Night at the Movies			
NBC	Winter	**Punky Brewster**	Silver Spoons	Knight Rider		NBC Sunday Night at the Movies			
NBC	Summer	**Punky Brewster**	Various programming (Note: Sitcom repeats and specials)			NBC Sunday Night at the Movies			
NBC	Late summer	**Punky Brewster**	Various programming	**OceanQuest**		NBC Sunday Night at the Movies			

=== Monday ===
Network		8:00 p.m.	8:30 p.m.	9:00 p.m.	9:30 p.m.	10:00 p.m.	10:30 p.m.
ABC	Fall	**Call to Glory**		Monday Night Football (25/17.0) (Tied with Remington Steele and Webster)			
ABC	Late fall	Hardcastle and McCormick		Monday Night Football (25/17.0) (Tied with Remington Steele and Webster)			
ABC	Winter	Hardcastle and McCormick		The ABC Monday Night Movie			
ABC	Summer	Monday Night Baseball					
ABC	Late summer	Hardcastle and McCormick (R)		The ABC Monday Night Movie			
CBS		Scarecrow and Mrs. King (22/17.1) (Tied with TV's Bloopers & Practical Jokes and The Fall Guy)		Kate & Allie (17/18.3)	Newhart (16/18.4)	Cagney & Lacey (26/16.9)	
NBC		TV's Bloopers & Practical Jokes (22/17.1) (Tied with Scarecrow and Mrs. King and The Fall Guy)		NBC Monday Night at the Movies (18/18.2)			

Note:

- On ABC, **Street Hawk** was supposed to air 8:00-9:00 p.m., but production problems delayed the series' premiere.

=== Tuesday ===
Network		8:00 p.m.	8:30 p.m.	9:00 p.m.	9:30 p.m.	10:00 p.m.	10:30 p.m.
ABC	Fall	Foul-Ups, Bleeps & Blunders	**Three's a Crowd**	**Paper Dolls**		**Jessie**	
ABC	Mid-fall	**Three's a Crowd**	**Who's the Boss?**	**Paper Dolls**		**Jessie**	
ABC	Late fall	**Three's a Crowd**	**Who's the Boss?**	**Glitter**		**Paper Dolls**	
ABC	Winter	**Three's a Crowd**	**Who's the Boss?**	**MacGruder and Loud**		**Call to Glory**	
ABC	Late winter	**Three's a Crowd**	**Who's the Boss?**	**MacGruder and Loud**		**Moonlighting**	
ABC	Spring	**Three's a Crowd**	Foul-Ups, Bleeps & Blunders	**Who's the Boss?**	**Hail to the Chief**	**MacGruder and Loud**	
ABC	Summer	**Who's the Boss?** (R)	**Three's a Crowd** (R)	**Moonlighting** (R)		**MacGruder and Loud**	
CBS	Fall	AfterMASH	**E/R**	The CBS Tuesday Night Movie			
CBS	Mid-fall	Special programming		The CBS Tuesday Night Movie			
CBS	Winter	The Jeffersons	Alice	The CBS Tuesday Night Movie			
CBS	Spring	**The Lucie Arnaz Show**	The Jeffersons	The CBS Tuesday Night Movie			
CBS	Mid-spring	Special programming		The CBS Tuesday Night Movie			
CBS	Summer	**The Lucie Arnaz Show**	The Jeffersons	The CBS Tuesday Night Movie			
CBS	Mid-summer	The Jeffersons (R)	Alice (R)	The CBS Tuesday Night Movie			
CBS	Late summer	The CBS Tuesday Night Movie				**West 57th**	
NBC		The A-Team (6/21.9)		Riptide (14/19.2)		Remington Steele (25/17.0) (Tied with Monday Night Football and Webster)	

=== Wednesday ===
Network		8:00 p.m.	8:30 p.m.	9:00 p.m.	9:30 p.m.	10:00 p.m.	10:30 p.m.
ABC	Fall	The Fall Guy (22/17.1) (Tied with Scarecrow and Mrs. King and TV's Bloopers & Practical Jokes)		Dynasty (1/25.0)		Hotel (12/19.7) (Tied with Cheers)	
ABC	Summer	**Rock 'n' Roll Summer Action**		Dynasty (1/25.0)		Hotel (12/19.7) (Tied with Cheers)	
CBS	Fall	**Charles in Charge**	**Dreams**	The CBS Wednesday Night Movie			
CBS	Mid-fall	**Charles in Charge**	**E/R**	The CBS Wednesday Night Movie			
CBS	Spring	**Double Dare**		The CBS Wednesday Night Movie			
CBS	Summer	**Charles in Charge** (R)	**E/R** (R)	The CBS Wednesday Night Movie			
CBS	Mid-summer	**I Had Three Wives**		The CBS Wednesday Night Movie			
NBC	Fall	**Highway to Heaven** (18/17.7)		The Facts of Life	**It's Your Move**	St. Elsewhere	
NBC	Mid-winter	**Highway to Heaven** (18/17.7)		The Facts of Life	**Sara**	St. Elsewhere	
NBC	Summer	**Highway to Heaven** (18/17.7)		The Facts of Life	Double Trouble (R)	St. Elsewhere	

=== Thursday ===
Network		8:00 p.m.	8:30 p.m.	9:00 p.m.	9:30 p.m.	10:00 p.m.	10:30 p.m.
ABC	Fall	**People Do the Craziest Things**	**Who's the Boss?**	**Glitter**		20/20	
ABC	Mid-fall	The ABC Thursday Night Movie				20/20	
ABC	Spring	**Wildside**		**Eye to Eye**		20/20	
ABC	Mid-spring	**Street Hawk**		Various programming (Note: Various repeats and specials)		20/20	
ABC	Summer	The ABC Thursday Night Movie				20/20	
CBS		Magnum, P.I. (15/19.1)		Simon & Simon (7/21.8)		Knots Landing (9/20.0)	
NBC		**The Cosby Show** (3/24.2)	Family Ties (5/22.1)	Cheers (12/19.7) (Tied with Hotel)	Night Court (20/17.6)	Hill Street Blues (30/16.6)	

=== Friday ===
Network		8:00 p.m.	8:30 p.m.	9:00 p.m.	9:30 p.m.	10:00 p.m.	10:30 p.m.
ABC	Fall	Benson	Webster (25/17.0) (Tied with Monday Night Football and Remington Steele)	**Hawaiian Heat**		Matt Houston	
ABC	Winter	Benson	Webster (25/17.0) (Tied with Monday Night Football and Remington Steele)	**Street Hawk**		Matt Houston	
ABC	Late winter	Webster (25/17.0) (Tied with Monday Night Football and Remington Steele)	**Mr. Belvedere**	Benson	**Off the Rack**	Matt Houston	
ABC	Spring	Webster (25/17.0) (Tied with Monday Night Football and Remington Steele)	**Mr. Belvedere**	Benson	**Off the Rack**	**Me and Mom**	
ABC	Summer	Webster (25/17.0) (Tied with Monday Night Football and Remington Steele)	**The Comedy Factory**	Benson	**People Do the Craziest Things**	Matt Houston	
ABC	Mid-summer	Webster (25/17.0) (Tied with Monday Night Football and Remington Steele)	**Mr. Belvedere** (R)	Benson	**Off the Rack** (R)	Various programming	
CBS	Fall	The Dukes of Hazzard		Dallas (2/24.7)		Falcon Crest (10/19.9) (Tied with Crazy Like a Fox)	
CBS	Spring	**Detective in the House**		Dallas (2/24.7)		Falcon Crest (10/19.9) (Tied with Crazy Like a Fox)	
CBS	May	The Dukes of Hazzard (R)		Dallas (2/24.7)		Falcon Crest (10/19.9) (Tied with Crazy Like a Fox)	
CBS	Summer	The Dukes of Hazzard (R)		Dallas (2/24.7)		Falcon Crest (10/19.9) (Tied with Crazy Like a Fox)	
NBC	Fall	**V**		**Hunter**		**Miami Vice**	
NBC	Late fall	**V**		**Miami Vice**		**Hot Pursuit**	
NBC	Winter	**V**		**Hunter**		**Miami Vice**	
NBC	Mid-winter	**Code Name: Foxfire**		**V**		**Miami Vice**	
NBC	Spring	**The Best Times**		**Half Nelson**		**Miami Vice**	
NBC	Summer	**Television Parts**	**Under One Roof** (R)	**V** (R)		**Miami Vice**	
NBC	Mid-summer	NBC Friday Night at the Movies				**Miami Vice**	
NBC	Late summer	Knight Rider (R)		**Motown Revue**		**Miami Vice**	

=== Saturday ===
Network		8:00 p.m.	8:30 p.m.	9:00 p.m.	9:30 p.m.	10:00 p.m.	10:30 p.m.
ABC		T. J. Hooker		The Love Boat		**Finder of Lost Loves**	
CBS	Fall	Airwolf		Mickey Spillane's Mike Hammer		**Cover Up**	
CBS	Winter	**Otherworld**		Airwolf		**Cover Up**	
CBS	Spring	**Charles in Charge**	**E/R** (R)	Airwolf		**Cover Up**	
CBS	Mid-spring	**Cover Up**		Airwolf		Mickey Spillane's Mike Hammer (R)	
CBS	Mid-summer	Airwolf (R)		CBS Saturday Movie			
NBC	Fall	Diff'rent Strokes	Gimme a Break!	**Partners in Crime**		**Hot Pursuit**	
NBC	Mid-fall	Diff'rent Strokes	Double Trouble	Gimme a Break!	**Spencer**	**Partners in Crime**	
NBC	Winter	Diff'rent Strokes	Double Trouble	Gimme a Break!	**It's Your Move**	**Berrenger's**	
NBC	Spring	Diff'rent Strokes	Double Trouble	Gimme a Break!	**Under One Roof**	**Hunter**	
NBC	Summer	Diff'rent Strokes	**It's Your Move** (R)	Gimme a Break!	Mama's Family (R)	Various programming	
NBC	Mid-summer	**Our Time**	**It's Your Move** (R)	Gimme a Break!	Mama's Family (R)	Various programming	
NBC	Late summer	Diff'rent Strokes (R)	**Our Time**	Gimme a Break!	Various programming (Note: Sitcom repeats, specials and unsold sitcom pilots)	Various programming	

Notes:

- **Spencer** was put on hiatus upon the departure of two main cast members (including the lead) and retooled as **Under One Roof**.
- Mama's Family consisted of reruns of the series' 1983–84 network run.

== By network ==
=== ABC ===
Returning Series

- 20/20
- The ABC Monday Night Movie
- ABC NFL Monday Night Football
- The ABC Sunday Night Movie
- Benson
- Dynasty
- The Fall Guy
- Foul-Ups, Bleeps & Blunders
- Hardcastle and McCormick
- Hotel
- Life's Most Embarrassing Moments
- The Love Boat
- Matt Houston
- Monday Night Baseball
- Monday Night Football
- Ripley's Believe It or Not!
- T. J. Hooker
- Webster

New Series

- The ABC Thursday Night Movie
- Call to Glory
- The Comedy Factory *
- Eye to Eye *
- Finder of Lost Loves
- Glitter
- Hail to the Chief *
- Hawaiian Heat
- Jessie
- MacGruder and Loud *
- Me and Mom *
- Mr. Belvedere *
- Moonlighting *
- Off the Rack *
- Paper Dolls
- People Do the Craziest Things
- Rock 'n' Roll Summer Action *
- Street Hawk *
- Three's a Crowd
- Who's the Boss?
- Wildside *

Not returning from 1983–84:

- 9 to 5
- The ABC Wednesday Night Movie
- a.k.a. Pablo
- Automan
- Blue Thunder
- Fantasy Island
- Happy Days
- Hart to Hart
- It's Not Easy
- Just Our Luck
- Lottery!
- Masquerade
- Oh Madeline
- Shaping Up
- That's Incredible!
- Three's Company
- Trauma Center
- Two Marriages

=== CBS ===
Returning Series

- 60 Minutes
- Airwolf
- AfterMASH
- Alice
- Cagney & Lacey
- Dallas
- The Dukes of Hazzard
- Falcon Crest
- The Jeffersons
- Kate & Allie
- Knots Landing
- Magnum, P.I.
- Mickey Spillane's Mike Hammer
- Newhart
- Scarecrow and Mrs. King
- Simon & Simon
- Trapper John, M.D.

New Series

- Charles in Charge
- Cover Up
- Crazy Like a Fox *
- Detective in the House *
- Double Dare *
- Dreams
- E/R
- I Had Three Wives *
- The Lucie Arnaz Show *
- Murder, She Wrote
- Otherworld *
- West 57th *

Not returning from 1983–84:

- The American Parade
- Cutter to Houston
- Domestic Life
- Double Dare
- Empire
- Emerald Point N.A.S.
- The Four Seasons
- Maggie Briggs
- Mama Malone
- The Mississippi
- One Day at a Time
- Whiz Kids

=== NBC ===
Returning Series

- The A-Team
- Cheers
- Diff'rent Strokes
- Double Trouble *
- The Facts of Life
- Family Ties
- Gimme a Break!
- Hill Street Blues
- Knight Rider
- NBC Sunday Night Movie
- NBC Monday Night at the Movies
- Night Court
- Remington Steele
- Riptide
- St. Elsewhere
- Silver Spoons
- TV's Bloopers & Practical Jokes

New Series

- Berrenger's *
- The Best Times *
- Code Name: Foxfire *
- The Cosby Show
- Highway to Heaven
- Half Nelson *
- Hot Pursuit
- Hunter
- It's Your Move
- Miami Vice
- Motown Revue
- OceanQuest
- Our Time
- Partners in Crime
- Punky Brewster
- Sara *
- Spencer/Under One Roof *
- Television Parts
- V: The Series

Not returning from 1983–84:

- Bay City Blues
- Boone
- Buffalo Bill
- Comedy Zone
- The Duck Factory
- First Camera
- For Love and Honor
- Jennifer Slept Here
- Legmen
- Mama's Family
- Manimal
- The Master
- Mr. Smith
- The New Show
- People Are Funny
- Real People
- The Rousters
- Summer Sunday U.S.A.
- We Got It Made
- The Yellow Rose

Note: The * indicates that the program was introduced in midseason.

== See also ==
- 1984–85 United States network television schedule (daytime)
- 1984–85 United States network television schedule (late night)
