= 1983–84 United States network television schedule =

The 1983–84 network television schedule for the three major English language commercial broadcast networks in the United States covers primetime hours from September 1983 through August 1984. The schedule is followed by a list per network of returning series, new series, and series cancelled after the 1982–83 season.

PBS is not included; member stations have local flexibility over most of their schedules and broadcast times for network shows may vary.

Each of the 30 highest-rated shows released in May 1984 is listed with its rank and rating as determined by Nielsen Media Research.

New series are highlighted in bold.

Repeat airings or same-day rebroadcasts are indicated by (R).

All times are U.S. Eastern and Pacific Time (except for some live sports or events). Subtract one hour for Central, Mountain, Alaska and Hawaii–Aleutian times.

== Legend ==
- Gray indicates encore programming.
- Blue-gray indicates news programming.
- Light green indicates sporting events.
- Red indicates series being burned off and other regularly scheduled programs, including specials and movies.
- highlight Lime highlights indicates the number-one most watched program of the season.
- highlight Yellow highlights indicates the top-10 most watched programs of the season.
- highlight Cyan highlights indicates numbers 11-20 most watched programs of the season.
- highlight Magenta highlights indicates numbers 21-30 most watched programs of the season.
- highlight Highlights indicates that it falls in multiple of the above categories.

== Sunday ==
Network		7:00 p.m.	7:30 p.m.	8:00 p.m.	8:30 p.m.	9:00 p.m.	9:30 p.m.	10:00 p.m.	10:30 p.m.
ABC		Ripley's Believe It or Not!		**Hardcastle and McCormick** (30/17.2)		The ABC Sunday Night Movie (12/20.4)			
CBS	Fall	60 Minutes (2/24.2)		Alice (28/17.2)	One Day at a Time	The Jeffersons (19/18.6)	Goodnight, Beantown	Trapper John, M.D.	
CBS	Winter	60 Minutes (2/24.2)		**The Four Seasons** (24/17.7)	One Day at a Time	The Jeffersons (19/18.6)	Alice (28/17.2)	Trapper John, M.D.	
CBS	Late winter	60 Minutes (2/24.2)		**Maggie Briggs**	**The Four Seasons** (24/17.7)	The Jeffersons (19/18.6)	Alice (28/17.2)	Trapper John, M.D.	
CBS	Spring	60 Minutes (2/24.2)		**Maggie Briggs**	**Domestic Life**	The Jeffersons (19/18.6)	Alice (28/17.2)	Trapper John, M.D.	
CBS	Mid-spring	60 Minutes (2/24.2)		**AfterMASH** (15/20.1)	**The Four Seasons** (24/17.7)	The Jeffersons (19/18.6)	Alice (28/17.2)	Trapper John, M.D.	
CBS	Summer	60 Minutes (2/24.2)		**AfterMASH** (15/20.1)	**The Four Seasons** (24/17.7)	The Jeffersons (19/18.6)	Alice (28/17.2)	Trapper John, M.D.	
CBS	Mid-summer	60 Minutes (2/24.2)		Goodnight, Beantown (R)	**The Four Seasons** (24/17.7)	The Jeffersons (19/18.6)	Alice (28/17.2)	Trapper John, M.D.	
CBS	Late summer	60 Minutes (2/24.2)		One Day at a Time (R)	Goodnight, Beantown (R)	The Jeffersons (19/18.6)	Alice (28/17.2)	Trapper John, M.D.	
NBC	Fall	First Camera		Knight Rider (29/17.2)		NBC Sunday Night at the Movies			
NBC	Winter	First Camera		Knight Rider (29/17.2)		NBC Sunday Night at the Movies			
NBC	Spring	First Camera		Knight Rider (29/17.2)		NBC Sunday Night at the Movies			
NBC	Mid-spring	Father Murphy (R)		Knight Rider (29/17.2)		NBC Sunday Night at the Movies			
NBC	Summer	Father Murphy (R)		Knight Rider (29/17.2)		NBC Sunday Night at the Movies			
NBC	Mid-summer	**Summer Sunday U.S.A.**		Knight Rider (29/17.2)		NBC Sunday Night at the Movies			

- Note: On NBC, Father Murphy consisted entirely of reruns of the 1981–83 series.

== Monday ==
Network		8:00 p.m.	8:30 p.m.	9:00 p.m.	9:30 p.m.	10:00 p.m.	10:30 p.m.
ABC	Fall	That's Incredible!		Monday Night Football (21/18.1)			
ABC	Winter	That's Incredible!		The ABC Monday Night Movie (13/20.4)			
ABC	Spring	**Automan**		The ABC Monday Night Movie (13/20.4)			
ABC	Mid-spring	Special programming		The ABC Monday Night Movie (13/20.4)			
ABC	Summer	Special programming		The ABC Monday Night Movie (13/20.4)			
ABC	Late summer	**Call to Glory**		The ABC Monday Night Movie (13/20.4)			
CBS	Fall	**Scarecrow and Mrs. King** (20/18.3)		**AfterMASH** (15/20.1)	Newhart (23/18.0)	**Emerald Point N.A.S.**	
CBS	Winter	**Scarecrow and Mrs. King** (20/18.3)		**AfterMASH** (15/20.1)	Newhart (23/18.0)	**Emerald Point N.A.S.**	
CBS	Spring	**Scarecrow and Mrs. King** (20/18.3)		**Kate & Allie** (8/21.9)	Newhart (23/18.0)	Cagney & Lacey (10/20.9)	
CBS	Mid-spring	**Scarecrow and Mrs. King** (20/18.3)		One Day at a Time	Newhart (23/18.0)	Cagney & Lacey (10/20.9)	
CBS	Summer	**Scarecrow and Mrs. King** (20/18.3)		One Day at a Time	Newhart (23/18.0)	Cagney & Lacey (10/20.9)	
CBS	Late summer	**Scarecrow and Mrs. King** (20/18.3)		**Kate & Allie** (R)	Newhart (23/18.0)	Cagney & Lacey (10/20.9)	
NBC	Fall	**Boone**		NBC Monday Night at the Movies (22/18.1)			
NBC	Winter	**TV's Bloopers & Practical Jokes** (14/20.3)		NBC Monday Night at the Movies (22/18.1)			
NBC	Spring	**TV's Bloopers & Practical Jokes** (14/20.3)		NBC Monday Night at the Movies (22/18.1)			
NBC	Summer	**TV's Bloopers & Practical Jokes** (14/20.3)		NBC Monday Night at the Movies (22/18.1)			

== Tuesday ==
Network		8:00 p.m.	8:30 p.m.	9:00 p.m.	9:30 p.m.	10:00 p.m.	10:30 p.m.
ABC	Fall	**Just Our Luck**	Happy Days	Three's Company	**Oh Madeline**	Hart to Hart	
ABC	Winter	**Foul-Ups, Bleeps & Blunders**	Happy Days	Three's Company	**Oh Madeline**	Hart to Hart	
ABC	Late winter	**Foul-Ups, Bleeps & Blunders**	**a.k.a. Pablo**	Three's Company	**Oh Madeline**	Hart to Hart	
ABC	Spring	**Foul-Ups, Bleeps & Blunders**	**a.k.a. Pablo**	Three's Company	**Shaping Up**	Hart to Hart	
ABC	Mid-spring	**Foul-Ups, Bleeps & Blunders**	Happy Days	Three's Company	**Oh Madeline** (R)	Hart to Hart	
ABC	Summer	**Foul-Ups, Bleeps & Blunders**	Three's Company (R)	**Hotel** (R)		Hart to Hart	
ABC	Late summer	**Foul-Ups, Bleeps & Blunders**	Three's Company (R)	The ABC Tuesday Night Movie			
CBS	Fall	The Mississippi		The CBS Tuesday Night Movie (26/17.2)			
CBS	Winter	The Mississippi		The CBS Tuesday Night Movie (26/17.2)			
CBS	Spring	**The American Parade**		The CBS Tuesday Night Movie (26/17.2)			
CBS	Summer	**AfterMASH** (R)	**Domestic Life** (R)	The CBS Tuesday Night Movie (26/17.2)			
NBC	Fall	The A-Team (4/24.0)		Remington Steele		**Bay City Blues**	
NBC	Late fall	The A-Team (4/24.0)		Remington Steele		**For Love and Honor**	
NBC	Winter	The A-Team (4/24.0)		**Riptide** (18/18.8)		Remington Steele	
NBC	Spring	The A-Team (4/24.0)		**Riptide** (18/18.8)		Remington Steele	
NBC	Summer	The A-Team (4/24.0)		**Riptide** (18/18.8)		Remington Steele	

== Wednesday ==
Network		8:00 p.m.	8:30 p.m.	9:00 p.m.	9:30 p.m.	10:00 p.m.	10:30 p.m.
ABC	Early fall	The Fall Guy (16/19.9)		**Two Marriages**		**Hotel** (9/21.1)	
ABC	Fall	The Fall Guy (16/19.9)		Dynasty (3/24.1)		**Hotel** (9/21.1)	
ABC	Winter	The Fall Guy (16/19.9)		Dynasty (3/24.1)		**Hotel** (9/21.1)	
ABC	Spring	The Fall Guy (16/19.9)		Dynasty (3/24.1)		**Hotel** (9/21.1)	
ABC	Summer	The Fall Guy (16/19.9)		The ABC Wednesday Night Movie			
ABC	Late summer	The Fall Guy (16/19.9)		Dynasty (R)		**Hotel** (R)	
CBS	Fall	**Whiz Kids**		The CBS Wednesday Night Movie			
CBS	Winter	**Domestic Life**	**Empire**	The CBS Wednesday Night Movie			
CBS	Spring	One Day at a Time	**Mama Malone**	The CBS Wednesday Night Movie			
CBS	Summer	**The American Parade**		The CBS Wednesday Night Movie			
NBC	Fall	Real People		The Facts of Life (25/17.3)	Family Ties	St. Elsewhere	
NBC	Winter	Real People		The Facts of Life (25/17.3)	**Night Court**	St. Elsewhere	
NBC	Spring	Real People		The Facts of Life (25/17.3)	**Double Trouble**	St. Elsewhere	
NBC	Summer	Real People		The Facts of Life (25/17.3)	**The Duck Factory**	St. Elsewhere	
NBC	Mid-summer	**Double Trouble** (R)	**Jennifer Slept Here** (R)	The Facts of Life (25/17.3)	**The Duck Factory**	St. Elsewhere	
NBC	Late summer	**Double Trouble** (R)	**Jennifer Slept Here** (R)	The Facts of Life (25/17.3)	Various pilots	St. Elsewhere	

== Thursday ==
Network		8:00 p.m.	8:30 p.m.	9:00 p.m.	9:30 p.m.	10:00 p.m.	10:30 p.m.
ABC	Fall	**Trauma Center**		9 to 5	**It's Not Easy**	20/20	
ABC	Winter	**Automan**		**Masquerade**		20/20	
ABC	Spring	**Two Marriages**		**Lottery!**		20/20	
ABC	Mid-spring	That's Incredible!		**Two Marriages**		20/20	
ABC	Summer	Happy Days	Various pilots	**Lottery!**		20/20	
ABC	Late summer	20/20		Various programming			
CBS		Magnum, P.I. (6/22.4)		Simon & Simon (5/23.8)		Knots Landing (11/20.8)	
NBC	Fall	Gimme a Break!	Mama's Family	**We Got It Made**	Cheers	Hill Street Blues	
NBC	Late fall	Gimme a Break!	Mama's Family	Cheers	Buffalo Bill	Hill Street Blues	
NBC	Winter	Gimme a Break!	Family Ties	Cheers	Buffalo Bill	Hill Street Blues	
NBC	Spring	Gimme a Break!	Family Ties	Cheers	**The Duck Factory**	Hill Street Blues	
NBC	Summer	Gimme a Break!	Family Ties	Cheers	**Night Court**	Hill Street Blues	

== Friday ==
Network		8:00 p.m.	8:30 p.m.	9:00 p.m.	9:30 p.m.	10:00 p.m.	10:30 p.m.
ABC	Fall	Benson	**Webster** (27/17.2)	**Lottery!**		Matt Houston	
ABC	Winter	Benson	**Webster** (27/17.2)	**Blue Thunder**		Matt Houston	
ABC	Spring	Benson	**Webster** (27/17.2)	**Masquerade**		Matt Houston	
ABC	Mid-spring	Benson	**Webster** (27/17.2)	**Blue Thunder**		Matt Houston	
ABC	Summer	Benson	**Webster** (27/17.2)	**Blue Thunder**		Matt Houston	
CBS		The Dukes of Hazzard		Dallas (1/25.7)		Falcon Crest (7/22.0)	
NBC	Fall	**Mr. Smith**	**Jennifer Slept Here**	**Manimal**		**For Love and Honor**	
NBC	Late fall	**Mr. Smith**	**Jennifer Slept Here**	NBC Friday Night at the Movies			
NBC	Winter	**Legmen**		**The Master**		**The New Show**	
NBC	Late winter	**The Master**		**Legmen**		**The New Show**	
NBC	Spring	**The Master**		NBC Friday Night at the Movies			
NBC	Summer	**The Master**		NBC Friday Night at the Movies			

== Saturday ==
Network		8:00 p.m.	8:30 p.m.	9:00 p.m.	9:30 p.m.	10:00 p.m.	10:30 p.m.
ABC		T. J. Hooker		The Love Boat (17/19.0)		Fantasy Island	
CBS	Fall	**Cutter to Houston**		The CBS Saturday Night Movie			
CBS	Winter	**Whiz Kids**		**Airwolf**		**Mickey Spillane's Mike Hammer**	
CBS	Spring	**Whiz Kids**		**Airwolf**		**Mickey Spillane's Mike Hammer**	
CBS	Summer	**Mama Malone**	The CBS Saturday Night Movie				
CBS	Late summer	**Airwolf** (R)		Various programming			
NBC	Fall	Diff'rent Strokes	Silver Spoons	**The Rousters**		**The Yellow Rose**	
NBC	Late fall	Diff'rent Strokes	Silver Spoons	**Manimal**		**The Yellow Rose**	
NBC	Winter	Diff'rent Strokes	Silver Spoons	**We Got It Made**	Mama's Family	**The Yellow Rose**	
NBC	Spring	Diff'rent Strokes	Silver Spoons	**People Are Funny**	Mama's Family	**The Yellow Rose**	
NBC	Mid-spring	Diff'rent Strokes	**Jennifer Slept Here**	**People Are Funny**	Mama's Family	**The Yellow Rose**	
NBC	Summer	Diff'rent Strokes	Silver Spoons (R)	Mama's Family (R)	**People Are Funny**	**The Rousters**	
NBC	Mid-summer	Diff'rent Strokes	Silver Spoons (R)	Bosom Buddies (R)	Mama's Family (R)	**Boone**	
NBC	Late summer	Diff'rent Strokes	Silver Spoons (R)	Bosom Buddies (R)	Mama's Family (R)	**Legmen**	

Note: Starting January 7, 1984, Whiz Kids replaced Cutter to Houston at 8:00/7:00 CST due to the latter's cancellation. After airing the two-hour pilot episode of Airwolf on January 22, 1984, following Super Bowl XVIII, CBS ran Airwolf in its first season at 9:00 EST/8:00 CST Saturdays starting with the episode "Daddy's Gone A Hunt'n" on January 28, 1984. Mickey Spillane's Mike Hammer starring Stacy Keach as Mike Hammer also premiered on CBS on January 28, 1984, at 10:00 EST/9:00 CST. On NBC, Bosom Buddies consisted of reruns of the 1980–1982 series.

== By network ==
=== ABC ===
**Returning Series**

- 20/20
- 9 to 5
- The ABC Monday Night Movie
- The ABC Sunday Night Movie
- Benson
- Dynasty
- The Fall Guy
- Fantasy Island
- Happy Days
- Hart to Hart
- Life's Most Embarrassing Moments
- The Love Boat
- Matt Houston
- Monday Night Baseball
- Monday Night Football
- Ripley's Believe It or Not!
- T. J. Hooker
- That's Incredible!
- Three's Company

**New Series**

- **The ABC Wednesday Night Movie**
- **a.k.a. Pablo** *
- **Automan** *
- **Blue Thunder** *
- **Foul-Ups, Bleeps & Blunders** *
- **Hardcastle and McCormick**
- **Hotel**
- **It's Not Easy**
- **Just Our Luck**
- **Lottery!**
- **Masquerade** *
- **Oh Madeline**
- **Shaping Up** *
- **Trauma Center**
- **Two Marriages**
- **Webster**

Not returning from 1982–83:

- The ABC Friday Night Movie
- Amanda's
- At Ease
- Baby Makes Five
- Condo
- The Greatest American Hero
- High Performance
- It Takes Two
- Joanie Loves Chachi
- Laverne & Shirley
- The New Odd Couple
- The Quest
- The Renegades
- Ryan's Four
- Star of the Family
- Tales of the Gold Monkey
- Too Close for Comfort ^

=== CBS ===
**Returning Series**

- 60 Minutes
- Alice
- Cagney & Lacey *
- Dallas
- The Dukes of Hazzard
- Falcon Crest
- Goodnight, Beantown
- The Jeffersons
- Knots Landing
- Magnum, P.I.
- The Mississippi
- Newhart
- One Day at a Time
- Simon & Simon
- Trapper John, M.D.

**New Series**

- **Airwolf** *
- **The American Parade** *
- **AfterMASH**
- **Cutter to Houston**
- **Domestic Life** *
- **Empire** *
- **The Four Seasons** *
- **Kate & Allie** *
- **Maggie Briggs**
- **Mama Malone** *
- **Mickey Spillane's Mike Hammer** *
- **Scarecrow and Mrs. King**
- **Whiz Kids**

Not returning from 1982–83:

- Ace Crawford, Private Eye
- Archie Bunker's Place
- Bring 'Em Back Alive
- Filthy Rich
- Foot in the Door
- Gloria
- Gun Shy
- M*A*S*H
- Private Benjamin
- Seven Brides for Seven Brothers
- Small & Frye
- Square Pegs
- Tucker's Witch
- Walt Disney
- Wizards and Warriors
- Zorro and Son

=== NBC ===
**Returning Series**

- The A-Team
- Buffalo Bill *
- Cheers
- Diff'rent Strokes
- The Facts of Life
- Family Ties
- Gimme a Break!
- Hill Street Blues
- Knight Rider
- Mama's Family
- NBC Monday Night at the Movies
- Real People
- Remington Steele
- St. Elsewhere
- Silver Spoons

**New Series**

- **Bay City Blues**
- **Boone**
- **Comedy Zone** *
- **Double Trouble** *
- **The Duck Factory** *
- **First Camera**
- **For Love and Honor**
- **Jennifer Slept Here**
- **Legmen** *
- **Manimal**
- **The Master** *
- **Mr. Smith**
- **The New Show** *
- **Night Court** *
- **People Are Funny** *
- **Riptide** *
- **The Rousters**
- **Summer Sunday U.S.A.** *
- **TV's Bloopers & Practical Jokes** *
- **We Got It Made**
- **The Yellow Rose**

Not returning from 1982–83:

- Bare Essence
- CHiPs
- The Devlin Connection
- Fame ^
- The Family Tree
- Father Murphy
- Gavilan
- Little House: A New Beginning
- Love, Sidney
- Monitor
- The News is the News
- The Powers of Matthew Star
- Quincy, M.E.
- Taxi
- Teachers Only
- Voyagers!

Note: The * indicates that the program was introduced in midseason. An ^ indicates a show that came back in first-run syndication after a network cancellation.
