= 1983 in American television =

In 1983, television in the United States saw a number of significant events, including the debuts, finales, and cancellations of television shows; the launch, closure, and rebranding of channels; changes and additions to network affiliations by stations; controversies, business transactions, and carriage disputes; and the deaths of individuals who had made notable contributions to the medium.

== Events ==
Date	Event
January 1	After episode 410 of Soul Train was broadcast this day, the series goes on hiatus for Don Cornelius's brain surgery. Original episodes return on April 30 after Cornelius returns from his convalescence.
January 3	Plinko is added as a pricing game on the CBS game show The Price Is Right; it will go on to become one of the most popular of the show's games. Also on this date, three new game shows debut on rival NBC: $ale of the Century, Just Men! and Hit Man. The two latter shows will leave the air after 13 weeks, whereas $ale (a revival of the hit NBC game show of the late 1960s-early 1970's) will go on to have a six-year run.
January 8	The NFL playoffs begin on CBS and NBC, who televised the NFC and AFC playoff games respectively. Because a players' strike reduced the regular season from 16 to only 9 games, the National Football League created a special 16-team playoff format (dubbed the "Super Bowl Tournament", where division standings were ignored and eight teams from each conference were seeded 1–8 based on their regular season records), just for this year. As a further consequence of the strike, this marked the first (and currently only) time that NFL playoff games were regionally televised across the United States instead of nationwide.
January 10	Canada's CBC and the United States' HBO launch the television series Jim Henson's Fraggle Rock, an educational co-production advocating tolerance.
January 30	The first regular episode for The A-Team airs after NBC's coverage of Super Bowl XVII.
February 5	The first part of a special two-part episode of Diff'rent Strokes called "The Bicycle Man", in which Arnold and Dudley encounter a pedophile (played by Gordon Jump), is broadcast on NBC. It is notable for starting the trend of very special episodes.
February 6–13	ABC broadcasts the epic miniseries The Winds of War, based on the novel by Herman Wouk. It is seen in part or in total by 140 million viewers, making it the most watched miniseries at the time.
February 13	Marvin Gaye performs a soulful rendition of "The Star-Spangled Banner" at the NBA All-Star Game at The Forum in Los Angeles. VH1 would later use it as the first very first video when they premiered on January 1, 1985. And when CBS broadcast their final NBA telecast at the end of the 1990 NBA Finals, they played Gaye's 1983 rendition of the anthem during the closing credits.
February 20	An extended cut of Star Trek: The Motion Picture premieres on the ABC. It added roughly 12 minutes to the film. The added footage was largely unfinished, and cobbled together for the network premiere; director Robert Wise hadn't wanted some of the footage to be included in the final cut of the film. This version was released on VHS and LaserDisc by Paramount in 1983.
February 21	ABC airs a made-for-television biographical film about the life of Princess Grace of Monaco, starring Cheryl Ladd. The producers would claim that Princess Grace assisted for several weeks with the film's pre-production before her death in September 1982.
February 23	PBS broadcasts The Operation, a live telecast of an actual open-heart surgery.
February 25	After sitting out the first 18 episodes of its fifth season due to a dispute over royalties, Tom Wopat and John Schneider, return to their roles as Bo and Luke Duke respectively on The Dukes of Hazzard on CBS. This is the only episode to feature all four Duke boys—Bo, Luke, Coy (Byron Cherry), and Vance (Christopher Mayer) appear in the opening credits.
February 28	More than 125 million Americans watch the 251st and final episode of M*A*S*H on CBS, "Goodbye, Farewell and Amen". It would be the most viewed television broadcast in U.S. history until Super Bowl XLIV in February 2010.
March 2	WFBC-TV, NBC affiliate in Greenville, changes its call sign to WYFF.
March 6	Country Music Television (CMT) begins in the United States.
March 6	The first televised USFL football game (Los Angeles Express vs. New Jersey Generals) is broadcast by ABC. The Express would ultimately win the game, 20–15.
March 7	The Nashville Network (TNN) (known later as The National Network and Spike TV; now known as Paramount Network) begins broadcasting.
March 10	MTV broadcasts the video of Michael Jackson's song "Billie Jean" for the first time. The video is the first by a black artist to gain great airplay on MTV, and is credited with helping the album Thriller, in which the song is included, become the best-selling album of all time.
March 18	CBS broadcasts Still the Beaver, a two-hour television movie which reintroduces the adult actors, reprising their child characters, from the original 1957–1963 sitcom Leave It to Beaver. This would be followed by a new television series which was also called Still the Beaver that would air on The Disney Channel for the 1984–85 season. Beginning in the 1986–87 season, the series, now named The New Leave It to Beaver, would air on WTBS, where it would remain until its conclusion in 1989.
March 19	US First Lady Nancy Reagan makes a special appearance on an episode of the NBC comedy Diff'rent Strokes, beginning her Just Say No anti-drug campaign.
March 20	NBC broadcasts the television movie Special Bulletin, a fictional—yet realistic—depiction of a television network's coverage of a nuclear terrorism threat in Charleston, South Carolina. The movie is an early collaboration between Edward Zwick (who directed) and Marshall Herskovitz (who wrote the teleplay); both men would create and produce thirtysomething later in the 1980s.
April 4	Archie Bunker's Place broadcasts its last original episode as CBS cancels the series after four seasons (and without a proper series finale), ending Carroll O'Connor's run as Archie Bunker, which began during 1971 with All in the Family.
April 4	The Morning Show, hosted by Regis Philbin and Cyndy Garvey, premieres locally on WABC in New York City. The show would eventually make its move to national syndication in 1988 with Philbin and Kathie Lee Gifford as his co-host.
April 7	Major League Baseball agrees to terms with ABC and NBC on a six-year television package, worth $1.2 billion. The two networks would continue to alternate coverage of the playoffs (ABC in even-numbered years and NBC in odd-numbered years), World Series (ABC would televise the World Series in odd-numbered years and NBC in even-numbered years) and All-Star Game (ABC would televise the All-Star Game in even-numbered years and NBC in odd-numbered years) through the 1989 season, with each of the 26 clubs receiving $7 million per year in return (even if no fans showed up). This was a substantial increase over the last package, in which each club was being paid $1.9 million per year. ABC contributed $575 million for the rights to televise prime time and Sunday afternoon regular season games and NBC paid $550 million for the rights to broadcast 30 Saturday afternoon games.
April 9	Vin Scully makes his debut as NBC's new lead play-by-play announcer for their Major League Baseball telecasts (a role that he would maintain through the 1989 season). Scully's first broadcast for NBC is a game between the Montreal Expos and Los Angeles Dodgers, where the Expos would defeat the Dodgers 7-2.
April 12	David Canary makes his first appearance on the ABC soap opera All My Children.
April 18	Disney Channel is initiated on American cable television. The first show televised is Good Morning, Mickey!
April 21	WTWC-TV in Tallahassee, Florida signs on, giving the Tallahassee market its first full-time NBC affiliate.
May 1–2	V is broadcast by NBC. The first episode is viewed by 40% of television viewers.
May 6	A fire at Southfork threatens the lives of the Ewings on the season finale of the CBS drama series Dallas.
May 6	ABC airs the broadcast network television premiere of The Shining.
May 16	The concert special Motown 25: Yesterday, Today, Forever is broadcast by NBC; Michael Jackson, after a performance with The Jackson Five, provides the centerpiece highlight by performing, to "Billie Jean", his "moonwalk" dance for the first time on television.
May 22	CBS introduces a new theme music (composed by Allyson Bellink and mostly consisting of an uptempo series of four notes and three bars each) for their coverage of the NBA. It uses a primitive-computer generated introduction (created by Bill Feigenbaum) of the NBA arenas (similar to the Boston Garden) until the 1989 Playoffs and later revived the second theme beginning in the 1989 Finals.
May 29	WVSB-TV in West Point, Mississippi signs on, giving the Tupelo market its first full-time ABC affiliate.
June 7	NBC affiliate in Miami/Fort Lauderdale, WCKT changes its call letters to WSVN.
June 16	Pope John Paul II arrives in his native Poland, with ABC (preempting a rerun of The Love Boat) and NBC (interrupting Wheel of Fortune and preempting Dream House) broadcasting his arrival live (CBS, hampered by budget reductions of its news division, continue to broadcast The Price Is Right instead).
June 20	KLDH (now KTKA-TV) in Topeka, Kansas signs on, giving the Topeka market its first full-time ABC affiliate.
June 23	Whitney Houston makes her national television debut when she performs on The Merv Griffin Show.
August 4	The cast of NBC's series Search for Tomorrow is forced to do a live show for the first time since the program began using videotape format during 1967 due to the loss of both the regular transmission tape and a backup.
August 10	KDVR, Denver's first UHF station goes on the air.
August 12	Denver's NBC station KOA-TV changes its name to KCNC-TV.
August 22	In Fargo, North Dakota, ABC affiliate KTHI-TV (now KVLY-TV) swaps affiliations with long-time NBC affiliate WDAY-TV and its semi-satellite in Grand Forks, WDAZ-TV.
August 30	Though the station is still regarded as profitable, Field Enterprises closes down WKBS-TV/Burlington, New Jersey-Philadelphia after failing to find a buyer.
September 5	PBS's series The MacNeil/Lehrer Report becomes The MacNeil/Lehrer NewsHour, the first American network news program to expand from a half-hour to one hour in length.
September 5	Tom Brokaw becomes the sole main anchor of the NBC Nightly News, ending a 17-month stint co-anchoring the broadcast with Roger Mudd.
September 5	Peter Jennings becomes sole anchorman of ABC's newscast World News Tonight, after the death of Frank Reynolds two months earlier.
September 5	Pam Long becomes co-main writer of the CBS soap opera Guiding Light.
September 5	During the first half of a broadcast of ABC's Monday Night Football between the Dallas Cowboys and Washington Redskins, Howard Cosell refers to Washington wide-receiver Alvin Garrett as a "little monkey". Cosell's remarks immediately ignites a racial controversy and plays a key factor in his departure from the Monday Night Football booth following the 1983 NFL season.
September 8	The comedy series We Got it Made debuts, the first new series on NBC's autumn list to premiere—and the start of one of the least successful new autumn show rosters for a network in history, as none of the series would survive a 2nd season (the other series being Manimal, Jennifer Slept Here, Mr. Smith, Bay City Blues, The Yellow Rose, Boone, For Love and Honor and The Rousters).
September 12	The animated G.I. Joe: A Real American Hero mini-series based on the toys of the same name debuts in syndication. Another miniseries airs the following year, with an ongoing show premiering in 1985.
September 17	The Peanuts gang get their very own Saturday morning cartoon series with The Charlie Brown and Snoopy Show on CBS. Earlier that year, said network cancelled their epynous prime time show Peanuts because it had run its course and already outdated. (The prime time series was given a proper finale in 1981.)
September 17	Alvin and the Chipmunks premieres on NBC.
September 17	Vanessa Williams is crowned Miss America 1984 on NBC. She became the first African American woman to win the title.
September 18	The band Kiss officially appears in public without make-up for the first time since its very early days on an appearance on MTV, which coincided with the release of Lick It Up.
September 19	The nighttime syndicated edition of the NBC daytime game show Wheel of Fortune premieres. The show is only picked up by 59 markets and is shut out of the top 3 markets. However, by late 1984, the show will overtake Family Feud as the number one show in syndication. Family Feud surpassed Wheel of Fortune as the most watched show in syndication in June 2015. It has continued to be in the top three shows in syndication through 2024.
September 19	Press Your Luck premieres on CBS; the game show would end its run on September 26, 1986.
September 25	WPVI newscaster Jim O'Brien is killed in a skydiving accident in Montgomery County, Pennsylvania at age 43.
September 27–29	NBC broadcasts Live... and in Person, a live variety special program broadcast during three nights. Sandy Gallin is host, and performers include Neil Diamond, Liberace, Linda Ronstadt, and the cast of A Chorus Line.
October 1	Mr. T guest-stars as himself on the NBC sitcom Diff'rent Strokes.
October 3	During a live NBC news update, anchor Jessica Savitch appears incoherent, slurring her speech, deviating from her copy and ad-libbing her report. Savitch, dogged by rumors of drug abuse and instability, still has her contract renewed, but drowns in a car accident three weeks later.
October 6	The rock band R.E.M. made its television debut on NBC's Late Night with David Letterman.
October 8	SIN broadcasts the final of the 6th National OTI-SIN Festival live from the Miami Jai-Alai Fronton in Miami.
October 9	Tiger Town, the first ever television film produced for the Disney Channel, premieres.
October 10	Adam, a television movie about the mysterious disappearance of Adam Walsh, makes its world premiere on NBC. The broadcast ends with a series of missing children's photographs and descriptions, along with a telephone number viewers could call to provide information on their disappearances.
October 29	SIN stages the 12th OTI Festival at the DAR Constitution Hall in Washington, D.C., which is broadcast live throughout Ibero-America.
October 30	Mackenzie Phillips makes her final appearance as Julie Cooper Horvath on the CBS sitcom One Day at a Time.
November 7-11	A five part episode of Mister Rogers' Neighborhood entitled "Conflict" is broadcast on PBS. The series/story arc covers the topics of war, bombs, and an arms race, and is created in response to the Invasion of Grenada, and the 1983 Beirut barracks bombings.
November 20	An estimated 100 million people watched the controversial made-for-television movie The Day After on ABC, depicting the start of a nuclear war.
November 24	Sesame Street on PBS dealt with the sensitive issue of death when Big Bird learns the concept as it relates to his late friend, Mr. Hooper (Will Lee, the actor who played Mr. Hooper, died of a heart attack in November 1982).
November 24	Jim Crockett Promotions produces the inaugural Starrcade event on closed-circuit television around the Southern United States. Predating the World Wrestling Federation's (later WWE) first WrestleMania event by two years, Starrcade would soon become Jim Crockett Promotions and later World Championship Wrestling's premier, flagship event.
November 29	ABC's affiliate in Nashville, WNGE-TV, changes its call sign to WKRN-TV after being sold by General Electric to Knight Ridder.
December 2	The epic (nearly 14 minutes) music video for Michael Jackson's "Thriller" is broadcast for the first time. It will become the most often repeated and famous music video of all time and increase Jackson's own popularity and the sales of the record album Thriller.
December 21	Gerald Ford, Betty Ford and Henry Kissinger make cameo appearances on ABC's Dynasty.
December 25	Several networks simultaneously air the 1951 version of A Christmas Carol; the combined ratings of these broadcasts make the December 25 broadcast(s) of A Christmas Carol the most-watched television event of the year in every single media market in the states of Georgia, Alabama, South Carolina, Tennessee, Maine, Ohio, Utah, Idaho, Wyoming, Indiana and Arkansas, as well as several other media markets throughout the United States.

== Programs ==
=== Debuting this year ===
Date	Show	Network
January 3	Hit Man	NBC
January 3	Just Men!	NBC
January 10	Fraggle Rock	HBO
January 11	The Joy of Painting	PBS
January 22	Mama's Family	NBC
January 23	The A-Team	NBC
February 5	The Dukes	CBS
February 10	Amanda's	ABC
February 26	Wizards and Warriors	CBS
March 2	High Performance	ABC
March 4	At Ease	ABC
March 7	Small & Frye	CBS
March 8	Fandango	TNN
March 8	I 40 Paradise	TNN
March 8	Nashville Now	TNN
March 15	Ace Crawford, Private Eye	CBS
April 1	Baby Makes Five	ABC
April 2	Goodnight, Beantown	CBS
April 6	Zorro and Son	ABC
April 10	Casablanca	NBC
April 15	Bare Essence	ABC
April 18	Good Morning, Mickey!	The Disney Channel
April 18	Welcome to Pooh Corner	The Disney Channel
May 31	Star Search	Syndication
May 31	Buffalo Bill	NBC
June 27	Loving	ABC
July 11	Reading Rainbow	PBS
July 29	Friday Night Videos	NBC
August 8	NBC News at Sunrise	NBC
August 16	Rosie	CBS
September 1	Donald Duck Presents	The Disney Channel
September 5	He-Man and the Masters of the Universe	Syndication
September 8	We Got It Made	NBC
September 9	Lottery!	ABC
September 10	The Littles	ABC
September 10	Rubik, the Amazing Cube	ABC
September 10	The New Scooby and Scrappy-Doo Show	ABC
September 12	Inspector Gadget	Syndication
September 16	Webster	ABC
September 17	Alvin and the Chipmunks	NBC
September 17	Mister T	NBC
September 17	Benji, Zax & the Alien Prince	CBS
September 17	The Biskitts	CBS
September 17	The Charlie Brown and Snoopy Show	CBS
September 17	Dungeons & Dragons	CBS
September 17	Saturday Supercade	CBS
September 18	Hardcastle and McCormick	ABC
September 19	Love Connection	Syndication
September 20	Just Our Luck	ABC
September 21	Hotel	ABC
September 23	Mr. Smith	NBC
September 26	Boone	NBC
September 26	AfterMASH	CBS
September 27	Oh Madeline	ABC
September 29	It's Not Easy	ABC
September 30	Manimal	NBC
October 1	The Rousters	NBC
October 1	Cutter to Houston	CBS
October 2	The Yellow Rose	NBC
October 3	Scarecrow and Mrs. King	CBS
October 5	Whiz Kids	CBS
October 15	Newton's Apple	PBS
October 17	Sally	Syndication
October 21	Jennifer Slept Here	NBC
October 25	Bay City Blues	NBC
October 31	Match Game-Hollywood Squares Hour	NBC
December 15	Automan	ABC
December 15	Masquerade	ABC

=== Resuming this year ===
Show	Last aired	Network	Retitled as/Same	New network/Same	Return date
Sale of the Century	1973	NBC	Same	Same	January 3
Dream House	1970	ABC	Same	NBC	April 4
Battlestars	1981	NBC	The New Battlestars	Same	April 4
The Paper Chase	1979	CBS	Same	Showtime	April 15
Second Chance	1977	ABC	Press Your Luck	CBS	September 19

=== Ending this year ===
Date	Show	Debut
February 3	The Greatest American Hero	1981
February 28	M*A*S*H	1972
March 21	Little House on the Prairie	1974
April 1	Hit Man	1983
April 1	Just Men!	1983
April 10	Gloria	1982
April 12	Ace Crawford, Private Eye	1983
April 29	Baby Makes Five	1983
May 10	Laverne & Shirley	1976
May 14	Wizards and Warriors	1983
May 24	Joanie Loves Chachi	1982
May 31	Bring 'Em Back Alive	1982
June 1	Tales of the Gold Monkey	1982
June 6	Love, Sidney	1981
June 15	Small & Frye	1983
June 24	Second City Television/SCTV Network 90	1981
July 7	The Crystal Cube	1983
July 17	CHiPs	1977
July 20	Taxi	1978
September 5	The All New Popeye Hour	1978
September 5	Quincy, M.E.	1976
September 10	Spider-Man and His Amazing Friends	1981
September 12	Square Pegs	1982
September 18	Father Murphy	1981
September 21	Archie Bunker's Place	1979
September 24	Walt Disney anthology series (returned in 1986)	1954
October 8	The Incredible Hulk	1982
October 27	It's Not Easy	1983
October 29	The Dukes	1983
November 5	Pac-Man	1982
November 15	Bay City Blues	1983
December 16	Mr. Smith	1983
December 27	Just Our Luck	1983

=== Changing networks ===
Show	Moved from	Moved to
SCTV	NBC	Cinemax
Fame	NBC	Syndication
Too Close for Comfort	ABC	Syndication
Second Chance	ABC	CBS
Candid Camera	Syndication	NBC
The Paper Chase	CBS	Showtime

=== Made-for-TV movies and miniseries ===
Title	Network	Premiere date
Baby Sister	ABC	March 6
Kennedy	NBC	November 20 (5 episodes)
Malibu	ABC	January 23
Packin' It In	CBS	February 7
Policewoman Centerfold	NBC	October 17
The Thorn Birds	ABC	March 27 (4 episodes)
The Winds of War	ABC	February 6 (7 episodes)
V	NBC	May 1 (2 episodes)

== Networks and services ==
=== Launches ===
Network	Type	Closure date	Notes	Source
Home Sports Entertainment	Cable television	January 4		
Country Music Television	Cable television	March 5		
The Nashville Network	Cable television	March 7		
Disney Channel	Cable television	April 18		
BET	Cable television	July 1		

=== Conversions and rebrandings ===
Old network name	New network name	Type	Conversion Date	Notes	Source
PRISM Sports New England	SportsChannel New England	Cable television	Unknown		

=== Closures ===
Network	Type	Closure date	Notes	Source
Star	Satellite television	February 12		
Satellite News Channel	Satellite television	October 27		

== Television stations ==
=== Station launches ===
Date	City of license/Market	Station	Channel	Affiliation	Notes
January 11	Milwaukee, Wisconsin	WVCY-TV	22	Religious independent	
February 2	Chicago, Illinois	WYCC	20	PBS	Returned to the air after a nine-year hiatus as WXXW
February 14	Fargo, North Dakota	KVNJ-TV	15	Independent	
March 3	Alexandria, Louisiana	KLAX-TV	31	ABC	
March 7	Des Moines, Iowa	KCBR	17	Independent	
March 9	Springfield, Missouri	KSPR	33	Independent	
March 13	Mount Vernon, Illinois/St. Louis, Missouri (Harrisburg, Illinois)	WCEE	13	Independent	
April 8	Williston, North Dakota	KWSE	4	PBS	Part of Prairie Public Television
April 18	Memphis, Tennessee	WMKW-TV	30	Independent	
April 21	Tallahassee, Florida	WTWC-TV	40	NBC	
April 22	Angola, Indiana	WBKZ	63		
April 30	Ashland, Kentucky (Huntington, West Virginia/Portsmouth, Ohio)	WTSF	66	Religious ind.	
May 10	Lander, Wyoming	KCWC-TV	8	PBS	
May 11	New York City	W63AS	63	PBS	LPTV translator of WVIA-TV
May 29	West Point/Tupelo, Mississippi	WVSB-TV	27	ABC	
June 10	Topeka, Kansas	KLDH	49	ABC	
June 19	Concord, California	KFCB	42	Independent	
June 20	Topeka, Kansas	KLDH	49	ABC	
June 26	Little Rock, Arkansas	KLRT-TV	16	Independent	
July 1	Alexandria, Louisiana	KLPA-TV	25	PBS	Part of Louisiana Public Broadcasting
July 4	Colby/Goodland, Kansas	KLBY	4	Independent	
July 27	Campbellsville/Louisville, Kentucky	WGRB	34	Independent	
August 10	Denver, Colorado	KDVR	31	Independent	
August 15	Fort Myers, Florida	WSFP-TV	30	PBS	
August 22	Hilo, Hawaii	KHBC-TV	13	Independent	Satellite of KHNL/Honolulu
September 5	Boston, Massachusetts	WNDS	50	Independent	
September 12	Kansas City, Missouri	KEKR-TV	62	Independent	
September 29	Reno, Nevada	KNPB	5	PBS	
October 1	Spokane, Washington	KSKN	22	Independent	
October 9	Vancouver, Washington (Portland/Salem, Oregon)	KPDX	49	Independent	
October 13	Wainscott/New York City, New York	W23AA	23		
October 15	Evansville, Indiana/Madisonville, Kentucky	WLCN	19	Religious ind.	
October 24	Miami, Florida	W30AB	30	PBS	LPTV translator of WPBT
October 31	Albuquerque/Santa Fe, New Mexico	KSAF-TV	2	Independent	
November 1	Ocala/Gainesville, Florida	WBSP-TV	51	Independent	
November 2	Moline, Illinois	WQPT-TV	24	PBS	
November 10	Columbus, Ohio	W08BV	8	Independent	
November 17	Evansville, Indiana	WEVV-TV	44	Independent	
December 2	Anchorage, Alaska	KTBY	4	Independent	
December 2	Cotati, California	KRCB	22	PBS	
December 4	Llano/Austin, Texas	KBVO-TV	42	Independent	
December 30	Honolulu, Hawaii	KHAI-TV	20	Independent	
December 31	Knoxville, Tennessee	WKCH-TV	43	Independent	

=== Stations changing network affiliation ===
Market	Date	Station	Channel	Prior affiliation	New affiliation
August 7	Fargo/Grand Forks, North Dakota	WDAY-TV; WDAZ-TV	6; 8	NBC	ABC
August 7	Fargo/Grand Forks, North Dakota	KTHI-TV	11	ABC	NBC
April 3	Green Bay, Wisconsin	WFRV-TV	5	NBC	ABC
April 3	Green Bay, Wisconsin	WLUK-TV	11	ABC	NBC
August 31	Harrisburg, Pennsylvania	WSBA-TV	43	CBS	Independent
April 3	Marquette, Michigan	WJMN-TV	3	NBC	ABC

=== Station closures ===
Date	Market	Station	Channel	Affiliation
March 31	St. John, Indiana	WCAE	50	PBS
July 31	Salem, Oregon	KVDO-TV	13	PBS
August 30	Philadelphia, Pennsylvania	WKBS-TV	48	Independent

== Births ==
Date	Name	Notability
January 2	Kate Bosworth	Actress (Young Americans)
January 6	Efrat Dor	Actress
January 7	Brett Dalton	Actor (Agents of S.H.I.E.L.D.)
January 7	Robert Ri'chard	Actor (Cousin Skeeter, One on One)
January 9	Kerry Condon	Actress
January 17	Rickey D'Shon Collins	Voice actor (Recess, Danny Phantom)
January 24	Frankie Grande	Actor (Henry Danger, Danger Force) and singer
February 1	Jillian Bynes	Actress
February 4	Hannibal Buress	Actor
February 4	Lauren Ash	Canadian actress (Superstore)
February 11	Dianna Russini	American sports journalist
February 12	Mimi Michaels	Actress
February 14	Julia Ling	Actress (Chuck)
February 17	Kristen Doute	Actress
February 18	Evan Jonigkeit	Actor
February 18	Wrenn Schmidt	Actress
February 21	Eoin Macken	Irish actor (The Night Shift)
February 22	Mimi Michaels	Actress
February 22	Iliza Shlesinger	Actress
February 23	Aziz Ansari	Actor (Parks and Recreation, Master of None)
February 23	Emily Blunt	British-American actress
February 26	Kara Monaco	Model and reality TV participant (Big Brother 14)
February 27	Kate Mara	Actress (24, American Horror Story, House of Cards)
March 1	Shawn Toovey	Actor (Dr. Quinn, Medicine Woman)
March 1	Lindsay Mendez	Actress
March 1	Lupita Nyong'o	Actress
March 7	Hettienne Park	Actress
March 8	Jessie Collins	Actress (The Nine)
March 10	Carrie Underwood	Singer (American Idol)
March 11	Lucy DeVito	Actress
March 12	Ron Funches	Actor
March 14	Taylor Hanson	Singer (Hanson)
March 15	Sean Biggerstaff	Scottish actor (Harry Potter)
March 18	Kyle Downes	Actor (Lizzie McGuire)
March 20	Michael Cassidy	Actor (The O.C., Privileged, Men at Work)
March 28	Ed O'Keefe	Guatemalan-American senior White House and political correspondent with CBS News
March 29	Ed Skrein	English actor
March 31	Ashleigh Ball	Canadian voice actress (Johnny Test, Edgar & Ellen, My Little Pony: Friendship Is Magic, Littlest Pet Shop, Ready Jet Go!)
March 31	Melissa Ordway	Actress (Hollywood Heights, The Young and the Restless)
April 1	Ellen Hollman	Actress (Spartacus: War of the Damned)
April 1	Matt Lanter	Actor (Commander in Chief, 90210, Star-Crossed, Star Wars: The Clone Wars, Ultimate Spider-Man, Timeless)
April 3	Errol Barnett	Anchor
April 4	Amanda Righetti	Actress (The O.C., North Shore, The Mentalist, Colony)
April 4	Eric Andre	Actor
April 6	Rick Cosnett	Zimbabwean-Australian actor (The Vampire Diaries, The Flash)
April 6	Diora Baird	Actress
April 10	Jamie Chung	Actress (Once Upon a Time, Gotham, Big Hero 6: The Series, The Gifted)
April 10	Ryan Merriman	Actor
April 12	Elle Duncan	American sports anchor
April 21	Gugu Mbatha-Raw	Actress
April 21	Ruthie Ann Miles	Actress
April 23	Aaron Hill	Actor
April 26	Ryan Dowell Baum	Actor (The Famous Jett Jackson)
April 27	Francis Capra	Actor (Veronica Mars)
April 27	Corey Harrison	Television personality
April 27	Ari Graynor	Actress (Fringe)
April 29	Megan Boone	Actress (The Blacklist)
April 29	Sam Jones III	Actor (Smallville, Blue Mountain State)
May 2	Gaius Charles	Actor (Friday Night Lights, Grey's Anatomy)
May 6	Adrianne Palicki	Actress (Friday Night Lights, Agents of S.H.I.E.L.D.)
May 6	Gabourey Sidibe	Actress (The Big C, Empire)
May 6	JR Lemon	Actor
May 8	Julia Chan	British actress (Saving Hope)
May 8	Elyes Gabel	English actor (Scorpion)
May 11	Holly Valance	New Zealand-born actress (Prison Break)
May 11	Matt Leinart	Football analyst for Fox Sports
May 14	Amber Tamblyn	Actress (General Hospital, Joan of Arcadia, Two and a Half Men, House)
May 19	Michael Che	Comedian (The Daily Show, Saturday Night Live)
May 20	Michaela McManus	Actress (Law & Order: Special Victims Unit, One Tree Hill, Awake, Aquarius)
May 20	Allen Maldonado	Actor
May 26	Scott Disick	Media personality
May 28	Megalyn Echikunwoke	Actress (Like Family, The 4400, CSI: Miami)
June 5	Chelsey Crisp	Actress
June 6	Lyndie Greenwood	Canadian actress (Sleepy Hollow)
June 10	Leelee Sobieski	Actress (Charlie Grace, NYC 22)
June 10	Shanna Collins	Actress
June 10	Jason Evigan	Singer
June 13	David Begnaud	American journalist
June 16	Olivia Hack	Voice actress (Hey Arnold!, Avatar: The Last Airbender, Bratz)
June 19	Aidan Turner	Irish actor (Being Human, Poldark) and singer
June 19	Macklemore	Singer
June 19	Tracey Wigfield	Writer
June 21	Michael Malarkey	Actor (The Vampire Diaries)
June 22	Thomas M. Wright	Actor
June 23	Brooks Laich	Ice hockey player
June 30	Angela Sarafyan	Actress
July 1	Lynsey Bartilson	Actress (Grounded for Life, The X's)
July 1	Tanya Chisholm	Actress (Big Time Rush)
July 2	Alicia Menendez	American host
July 6	Gregory Smith	Canadian-American actor (Everwood, Rookie Blue)
July 19	Trai Byers	Actor (Empire)
July 23	Andrew Eiden	Actor (Complete Savages)
July 27	Blair Redford	Actor (The Lying Game, Satisfaction)
July 27	Heidi Gardner	Actress (Saturday Night Live)
July 28	Kate Bolduan	CNN journalist
July 29	Kaitlyn Black	Actress (Hart of Dixie)
July 29	Tania Gunadi	Actress (Aaron Stone, Transformers: Prime, Sanjay and Craig, Penn Zero: Part-Time Hero)
July 30	Nathan Carter	Canadian actor
August 3	Mamie Gummer	Actress (Emily Owens, M.D.) and daughter of Meryl Streep and Don Gummer
August 4	Adhir Kalyan	South African actor (Aliens in America, Rules of Engagement, Second Chance)
August 4	Greta Gerwig	Actress (China, IL)
August 4	Nathaniel Buzolic	Actor
August 5	Kara Tointon	English actress (EastEnders)
August 8	Fred Meyers	Actor (Even Stevens)
August 8	Guy Burnet	Actor
August 9	Ashley Johnson	Actress (Growing Pains, Jumanji, Recess, Teen Titans, Super Robot Monkey Team Hyperforce Go!, Ben 10, Teen Titans Go!, Blindspot, Infinity Train)
August 9	Dan Levy	Actor
August 11	Chris Hemsworth	Australian actor (Home and Away)
August 12	Jericka Duncan	American national TV news correspondent
August 14	Mila Kunis	Actress (That '70s Show, Family Guy)
August 14	Lamorne Morris	Actor (New Girl)
August 18	Max Winkler	American director
August 19	Peter Mooney	Canadian actor (Rookie Blue)
August 20	Andrew Garfield	British-American actor
August 21	Brody Jenner	Actor (The Hills, Keeping Up with the Kardashians)
August 22	Laura Breckenridge	Actress (Related)
August 22	Alan Yang	Actor
August 23	Annie Ilonzeh	Actress
August 23	Ruta Gedmintas	Actress
August 25	Caitlin FitzGerald	Actress
August 29	Jennifer Landon	Actress (As the World Turns)
September 2	Tiffany Hines	Actress (Beyond the Break, Nikita)
September 3	Christine Woods	Actress
September 6	Braun Strowman	Pro wrestler
September 7	Chris Kelly	Writer
September 9	Zoe Kazan	Actress
September 9	Eboni K. Williams	Television host
September 10	Sarah Schneider	Actress
September 14	Amy Winehouse	English singer (d. 2011)
September 21	Maggie Grace	Actress (Lost)
September 21	Joseph Mazzello	Actor
September 22	Mamrie Hart	Actress
September 25	Donald Glover	Actor (Community, Atlanta) and rapper
September 26	Zoe Perry	Actress
October 3	Tessa Thompson	Actress
October 5	Noah Segan	Voice actor (Henry on KaBlam!)
October 5	Jesse Eisenberg	Actor (Get Real)
October 5	Shelby Rabara	Voice actress (Peridot on Steven Universe)
October 8	Travis Pastrana	Race car driver
October 9	Spencer Grammer	Actress (As the World Turns, Greek, Rick and Morty)
October 12	Tony Cavalero	Actor (School of Rock)
October 13	Katia Winter	Actress
October 17	Michelle Ang	Actress
October 20	Alona Tal	Israeli singer and actress (The Pyjamas, Veronica Mars, Supernatural, Cane, Cult, Hand of God)
October 21	Charlotte Sullivan	Canadian actress (Rookie Blue)
October 21	Aaron Tveit	Actor
October 21	Amber Rose	Television personality
October 24	Katie McGrath	Irish actress (Merlin, Dracula, Supergirl)
October 24	Adrienne Bailon	Actress (That's So Raven, The Cheetah Girls, The Real)
October 26	Katy Tur	American author
October 26	Folake Olowofoyeku	Actress
October 29	Dillon Casey	Actor (Nikita)
October 29	Johnny Lewis	Actor (Quintuplets, Sons of Anarchy) (d. 2012)
October 29	Richard Brancatisano	Australian actor (Power Rangers Mystic Force, Chasing Life)
November 7	Adam DeVine	Actor (Workaholics, Uncle Grandpa, Penn Zero: Part-Time Hero)
November 10	Miranda Lambert	Singer
November 16	Levy Tran	Actress
November 17	Harry Lloyd	Actor (Manhattan, Game of Thrones, Counterpart)
November 18	Robert Kazinsky	Actor
November 19	Adam Driver	Actor (Girls)
November 20	Future	Rapper
November 21	Claire van der Boom	Actress
November 21	The Bella Twins	Pro wrestling duo (WWE, Total Divas, Total Bellas, Twin Love)
November 22	Andrew J. West	Actor (The Walking Dead, Once Upon a Time)
November 24	Karine Vanasse	Actress
November 27	Arjay Smith	Actor (The Journey of Allen Strange)
November 29	Pamela Brown	Newscaster
November 30	CJ Gibson	Model
December 2	Jana Kramer	Actress (One Tree Hill) and country music singer
December 2	Daniela Ruah	Portuguese-American actress (NCIS: Los Angeles)
December 8	Utkarsh Ambudkar	Actor
December 9	Jolene Purdy	Actress
December 10	Patrick Flueger	Actor (The 4400, Chicago Fire, Chicago P.D.)
December 12	Mathew Valencia	Actor (voice of Robin on The New Batman Adventures)
December 13	Satya Bhabha	Actor
December 15	Camilla Luddington	English actress (Grey's Anatomy)
December 20	Jonah Hill	Actor (Allen Gregory)
December 21	Steven Yeun	Actor
December 22	Joe Dinicol	Actor
December 30	Ashley Zukerman	Australian actor

== Deaths ==
Date	Name	Age	Notability
February 4	Karen Carpenter	32	Singer and drummer (The Carpenters)
March 9	Faye Emerson	65	Actress (Faye Emerson's Wonderful Town)
March 16	Arthur Godfrey	79	Host (Arthur Godfrey's Talent Scouts)
July 20	Frank Reynolds	53	ABC News journalist
July 29	Raymond Massey	86	Actor (Dr. Gillespie on Dr. Kildare)
August 3	Carolyn Jones	53	Actress (Morticia on The Addams Family)
August 28	Jan Clayton	66	Actress (Ellen Miller on Lassie)
August 29	Simon Oakland	68	Actor (Baa Baa Black Sheep)
October 23	Jessica Savitch	36	NBC News anchor
November 14	Junior Samples	57	Comedian (Hee Haw)
November 22	Michael Conrad	58	Actor (Sgt. Phil Esterhasz on Hill Street Blues)
November 28	Christopher George	52	Actor (Sgt. Sam Troy on The Rat Patrol)
December 28	Dennis Wilson	39	Singer-songwriter (The Beach Boys) and brother of Brian Wilson
December 28	William Demarest	91	Actor (Uncle Charley on My Three Sons)

== See also ==
- 1983 in the United States
- List of American films of 1983
