= Top-rated United States television programs of 1983–84 =

This table displays the top-rated primetime television series of the 1983–84 season as measured by Nielsen Media Research.

Rank	Program	Network	Rating
1	Dallas	CBS	25.7
2	60 Minutes	CBS	24.2
3	Dynasty	ABC	24.1
4	The A-Team	NBC	24.0
5	Simon & Simon	CBS	23.8
6	Magnum, P.I.	CBS	22.4
7	Falcon Crest	CBS	22.0
8	Kate & Allie	CBS	21.9
9	Hotel	ABC	21.1
10	Cagney & Lacey	CBS	20.9
11	Knots Landing	CBS	20.8
12	ABC Sunday Night Movie	ABC	20.4
12	ABC Monday Night Movie	ABC	20.4
14	TV's Bloopers & Practical Jokes	NBC	20.3
15	AfterMASH	CBS	20.1
16	The Fall Guy	ABC	19.9
17	The Love Boat	ABC	19.0
18	Riptide	NBC	18.8
19	The Jeffersons	CBS	18.6
20	Scarecrow & Mrs. King	CBS	18.3
21	Monday Night Football	ABC	18.1
21	NBC Monday Night Movie	NBC	18.1
23	Newhart	CBS	18.0
24	The Facts of Life	NBC	17.3
25	CBS Tuesday Night Movie	CBS	17.2
25	Webster	ABC	17.2
25	Alice	CBS	17.2
25	Knight Rider	NBC	17.2
25	Hardcastle and McCormick	ABC	17.2
30	Trapper John, M.D.	CBS	17.0

== See also ==
1983-1984 Season Ratings Standings (All 101 tracked series for the year, listed)
