= 1982–83 United States network television schedule =

The following is the 1982–83 network television schedule for the three major English language commercial broadcast networks in the United States. The schedule covers primetime hours from September 1982 through August 1983. The schedule is followed by a list per network of returning series, new series, and series cancelled after the 1981–82 season. All times are Eastern and Pacific, with certain exceptions, such as Monday Night Football.

New series are highlighted in bold.

Each of the 30 highest-rated shows is listed with its rank and rating as determined by Nielsen Media Research.

Yellow indicates the programs in the top 10 for the season.
Cyan indicates the programs in the top 20 for the season.
Magenta indicates the programs in the top 30 for the season.

PBS is not included; member stations have local flexibility over most of their schedules and broadcast times for network shows may vary.

== Sunday ==
Network		7:00 PM	7:30 PM	8:00 PM	8:30 PM	9:00 PM	9:30 PM	10:00 PM	10:30 PM
ABC		**Ripley's Believe It or Not!**		**Matt Houston**		The ABC Sunday Night Movie (26/17.6)			
CBS	Fall	60 Minutes (1/25.5)		Archie Bunker's Place (22/18.3) (Tied with That's Incredible!)	**Gloria** (18/18.7) (Tied with Trapper John, M.D.)	The Jeffersons (12/20.0) (Tied with Newhart)	One Day at a Time (16/19.1)	Trapper John, M.D. (18/18.7) (Tied with Gloria)	
CBS	Winter	60 Minutes (1/25.5)		Archie Bunker's Place (22/18.3) (Tied with That's Incredible!)	**Gloria** (18/18.7) (Tied with Trapper John, M.D.)	The Jeffersons (12/20.0) (Tied with Newhart)	One Day at a Time (16/19.1)	Trapper John, M.D. (18/18.7) (Tied with Gloria)	
CBS	Spring	60 Minutes (1/25.5)		**Goodnight, Beantown**	**Gloria** (18/18.7) (Tied with Trapper John, M.D.)	The Jeffersons (12/20.0) (Tied with Newhart)	**Newhart** (12/20.0) (Tied with The Jeffersons)	Trapper John, M.D. (18/18.7) (Tied with Gloria)	
CBS	Mid-spring	60 Minutes (1/25.5)		**Goodnight, Beantown**	**Newhart** (12/20.0) (Tied with The Jeffersons)	The Jeffersons (12/20.0) (Tied with Newhart)	Alice	Trapper John, M.D. (18/18.7) (Tied with Gloria)	
CBS	Summer	60 Minutes (1/25.5)		Alice (R)	One Day at a Time (R)	The Jeffersons (12/20.0) (Tied with Newhart)	**Newhart** (R)	Trapper John, M.D. (18/18.7) (Tied with Gloria)	
CBS	Late summer	60 Minutes (1/25.5)		Alice (R)	One Day at a Time (R)	The Jeffersons (12/20.0) (Tied with Newhart)	**Goodnight, Beantown** (R)	Trapper John, M.D. (18/18.7) (Tied with Gloria)	
NBC	Fall	**Voyagers!**		CHiPs		NBC Sunday Night at the Movies			
NBC	Winter	**Voyagers!**		CHiPs		NBC Sunday Night at the Movies			
NBC	Spring	**Casablanca**		CHiPs		NBC Sunday Night at the Movies			
NBC	Summer	**Voyagers!**		CHiPs		NBC Sunday Night at the Movies			
NBC	Late summer	**The Powers of Matthew Star** (R)		**Knight Rider** (R)		NBC Sunday Night at the Movies			

== Monday ==
Network		8:00 PM	8:30 PM	9:00 PM	9:30 PM	10:00 PM	10:30 PM
ABC	Fall	That's Incredible! (22/18.3) (Tied with Archie Bunker's Place)		Monday Night Football (10/20.1) (Tied with The A-Team)			
ABC	Winter	That's Incredible! (22/18.3) (Tied with Archie Bunker's Place)		The ABC Monday Night Movie (24/18.0)			
ABC	Spring	That's Incredible! (22/18.3) (Tied with Archie Bunker's Place)		The ABC Monday Night Movie (24/18.0)			
ABC	Summer	Monday Night Baseball					
CBS	Fall	**Square Pegs**	Private Benjamin	M*A*S*H (3/22.6) (Tied with Magnum, P.I.)	**Newhart** (12/20.0) (Tied with The Jeffersons)	Cagney & Lacey	
CBS	Winter	**Square Pegs**	Filthy Rich	M*A*S*H (3/22.6) (Tied with Magnum, P.I.)	**Newhart** (12/20.0) (Tied with The Jeffersons)	Cagney & Lacey	
CBS	Late winter	**Square Pegs**	**Small & Frye**	Alice	One Day at a Time (16/19.1)	Cagney & Lacey	
CBS	Spring	Archie Bunker's Place (22/18.3) (Tied with That's Incredible!)	**Foot in the Door**	Alice	One Day at a Time (16/19.1)	Cagney & Lacey	
CBS	Mid-spring	Archie Bunker's Place (22/18.3) (Tied with That's Incredible!)	**Foot in the Door**	M*A*S*H (R)	One Day at a Time (16/19.1)	Cagney & Lacey	
CBS	Summer	**Square Pegs** (R)	Private Benjamin (R)	M*A*S*H (R)	Archie Bunker's Place (R)	Cagney & Lacey	
CBS	Mid-summer	**Square Pegs** (R)	Private Benjamin (R)	**Tucker's Witch** (R)		Cagney & Lacey	
CBS	Late summer	**Square Pegs** (R)	Private Benjamin (R)	M*A*S*H (R)	**Newhart** (R)	Cagney & Lacey	
NBC	Fall	**Little House: A New Beginning** (28/17.4) (Tied with Happy Days)		NBC Monday Night at the Movies			
NBC	Winter	**Little House: A New Beginning** (28/17.4) (Tied with Happy Days)		NBC Monday Night at the Movies			
NBC	Spring	Love, Sidney	**Family Ties**	NBC Monday Night at the Movies			
NBC	Summer	Love, Sidney	**Family Ties**	NBC Monday Night at the Movies			

== Tuesday ==
Network		8:00 PM	8:30 PM	9:00 PM	9:30 PM	10:00 PM	10:30 PM
ABC	Fall	Happy Days (28/17.4) (Tied with Little House: A New Beginning)	Laverne & Shirley (25/17.8)	Three's Company (6/21.2)	9 to 5 (15/19.3)	Hart to Hart (17/18.9)	
ABC	Winter	Happy Days (28/17.4) (Tied with Little House: A New Beginning)	Laverne & Shirley (25/17.8)	Three's Company (6/21.2)	9 to 5 (15/19.3)	Hart to Hart (17/18.9)	
ABC	Spring	Happy Days (28/17.4) (Tied with Little House: A New Beginning)	Laverne & Shirley (25/17.8)	Three's Company (6/21.2)	9 to 5 (15/19.3)	Hart to Hart (17/18.9)	
ABC	Mid-spring	Happy Days (28/17.4) (Tied with Little House: A New Beginning)	Joanie Loves Chachi	Three's Company (6/21.2)	9 to 5 (15/19.3)	Hart to Hart (17/18.9)	
ABC	Summer	Happy Days (28/17.4) (Tied with Little House: A New Beginning)	Joanie Loves Chachi	Three's Company (6/21.2)	9 to 5 (15/19.3)	Hart to Hart (17/18.9)	
ABC	Mid-summer	**The 1/2 Hour Comedy Hour**	Joanie Loves Chachi	Three's Company (6/21.2)	9 to 5 (15/19.3)	Hart to Hart (17/18.9)	
ABC	Late summer	Happy Days (R)	Joanie Loves Chachi	Three's Company (6/21.2)	9 to 5 (15/19.3)	Hart to Hart (17/18.9)	
CBS	Fall	**Bring 'Em Back Alive**		The CBS Tuesday Night Movies (27/17.5)			
CBS	Winter	Walt Disney		The CBS Tuesday Night Movies (27/17.5)			
CBS	Spring	**Ace Crawford, Private Eye**	**Gun Shy**	The CBS Tuesday Night Movies (27/17.5)			
CBS	Mid-spring	Special programming		The CBS Tuesday Night Movies (27/17.5)			
CBS	Late spring	**Bring 'Em Back Alive**		The CBS Tuesday Night Movies (27/17.5)			
CBS	Summer	**On the Road with Charles Kuralt**	**Our Times with Bill Moyers**	The CBS Tuesday Night Movies (27/17.5)			
NBC	Fall	Father Murphy		**Gavilan**		**St. Elsewhere**	
NBC	Winter	**The A-Team** (10/20.1) (Tied with Monday Night Football)		**Bare Essence**		**St. Elsewhere**	
NBC	Spring	**The A-Team** (10/20.1) (Tied with Monday Night Football)		**Remington Steele**		**St. Elsewhere**	
NBC	Summer	**The A-Team** (10/20.1) (Tied with Monday Night Football)		**Remington Steele**		**St. Elsewhere**	

== Wednesday ==
Network		8:00 PM	8:30 PM	9:00 PM	9:30 PM	10:00 PM	10:30 PM
ABC	Fall	**Tales of the Gold Monkey**		The Fall Guy (14/19.4)		Dynasty (5/22.4)	
ABC	Winter	**Tales of the Gold Monkey**		The Fall Guy (14/19.4)		Dynasty (5/22.4)	
ABC	Late winter	**High Performance**		The Fall Guy (14/19.4)		Dynasty (5/22.4)	
ABC	Spring	The Fall Guy (14/19.4)		**Ryan's Four**		Dynasty (5/22.4)	
ABC	Mid-spring	The Fall Guy (14/19.4)		The ABC Wednesday Night Movie			
ABC	Summer	The Fall Guy (14/19.4)		**Tales of the Gold Monkey**		Dynasty (R)	
ABC	Mid-summer	The Fall Guy (14/19.4)		**The Hamptons**		Dynasty (R)	
ABC	Late summer	The Fall Guy (14/19.4)		**Two Marriages**		Dynasty (R)	
CBS	Fall	**Seven Brides for Seven Brothers**		Alice	Filthy Rich	**Tucker's Witch**	
CBS	Mid-fall	**Seven Brides for Seven Brothers**		The CBS Wednesday Night Movie			
CBS	Winter	**Seven Brides for Seven Brothers**		The CBS Wednesday Night Movie			
CBS	Spring	**Zorro and Son**	**Square Pegs** (R)	The CBS Wednesday Night Movie			
CBS	Summer	**Small & Frye**	Filthy Rich	The CBS Wednesday Night Movie			
CBS	Mid-summer	Archie Bunker's Place (R)	**Gloria** (R)	The CBS Wednesday Night Movie			
NBC	Fall	Real People (30/17.2) (Tied with The Dukes of Hazzard)		The Facts of Life	**Family Ties**	Quincy, M.E.	
NBC	Winter	Real People (30/17.2) (Tied with The Dukes of Hazzard)		The Facts of Life	**Family Ties**	Quincy, M.E.	
NBC	Spring	Real People (30/17.2) (Tied with The Dukes of Hazzard)		The Facts of Life	Taxi	Quincy, M.E.	
NBC	Early summer	Real People (30/17.2) (Tied with The Dukes of Hazzard)		The Facts of Life	**Buffalo Bill**	Quincy, M.E.	
NBC	Summer	Real People (30/17.2) (Tied with The Dukes of Hazzard)		The Facts of Life	**Buffalo Bill**	**The News Is the News**	Taxi
NBC	Mid-summer	Real People (30/17.2) (Tied with The Dukes of Hazzard)		The Facts of Life	**Buffalo Bill**	**The Family Tree** (R)	
NBC	Late summer	Real People (30/17.2) (Tied with The Dukes of Hazzard)		The Facts of Life	**Family Ties** (R)	**St. Elsewhere** (R)	

Note: On CBS, a sitcom called Mama Malone was supposed to have aired 9:30-10 p.m., but was delayed when CBS decided to place Filthy Rich into the schedule. Mama Malone did not air until the spring of 1984.

== Thursday ==
Network		8:00 PM	8:30 PM	9:00 PM	9:30 PM	10:00 PM	10:30 PM
ABC	Fall	Joanie Loves Chachi	**Star of the Family**	Too Close for Comfort	**It Takes Two**	20/20	
ABC	Winter	The Greatest American Hero		Too Close for Comfort	**It Takes Two**	20/20	
ABC	Mid-winter	**Condo**	**Amanda's**	Too Close for Comfort	**It Takes Two**	20/20	
ABC	Spring	Benson	**Condo**	Too Close for Comfort	**It Takes Two**	20/20	
ABC	Mid-spring	Special programming		Too Close for Comfort	**Amanda's**	20/20	
ABC	Summer	**Condo**	**The New Odd Couple**	Too Close for Comfort	**It Takes Two** (R)	20/20	
ABC	Mid-summer	The ABC Thursday Night Movie				20/20	
ABC	Late summer	**Eye On Hollywood**	Too Close for Comfort (R)	**Reggie**	**It Takes Two** (R)	20/20	
CBS	Fall	Magnum, P.I. (3/22.6) (Tied with M*A*S*H)		Simon & Simon (7/21.0)		Knots Landing (20/18.6)	
CBS	Winter	Magnum, P.I. (3/22.6) (Tied with M*A*S*H)		Simon & Simon (7/21.0)		Knots Landing (20/18.6)	
CBS	Spring	Magnum, P.I. (3/22.6) (Tied with M*A*S*H)		Simon & Simon (7/21.0)		**Tucker's Witch**	
CBS	Summer	Magnum, P.I. (3/22.6) (Tied with M*A*S*H)		Simon & Simon (7/21.0)		Knots Landing (R)	
NBC	Fall	Fame		**Cheers**	Taxi	Hill Street Blues (21/18.4)	
NBC	Winter	Fame		Gimme a Break!	**Cheers**	Hill Street Blues (21/18.4)	
NBC	Spring	Fame		Gimme a Break!	**Cheers**	Hill Street Blues (21/18.4)	
NBC	Summer	Fame		Gimme a Break!	**Cheers**	Hill Street Blues (21/18.4)	
NBC	Late summer	Gimme a Break! (R)	**Mama's Family** (R)	Various programming	**Cheers**	Hill Street Blues (21/18.4)	

Note : Mama's Family was supposed to have aired on NBC 9:30-10 p.m., but was pushed back to midseason when NBC picked up Taxi.

== Friday ==
Network		8:00 PM	8:30 PM	9:00 PM	9:30 PM	10:00 PM	10:30 PM
ABC	Fall	Benson	The New Odd Couple	The Greatest American Hero		**The Quest**	
ABC	Mid-fall	Benson	The New Odd Couple	ABC Friday Night Movie			
ABC	Winter	Benson	**The New Odd Couple**	ABC Friday Night Movie			
ABC	Late winter	Benson	At Ease	**Renegades**		**Tales of the Gold Monkey**	
ABC	Spring	**Baby Makes Five**	At Ease	**Renegades**		**Tales of the Gold Monkey**	
ABC	Mid-spring	**The New Odd Couple**	At Ease	ABC Friday Night Movie			
ABC	Summer	Benson (R)	At Ease	ABC Friday Night Movie			
CBS	Fall	The Dukes of Hazzard (30/17.2) (Tied with Real People)		Dallas (2/24.6)		Falcon Crest (8/20.7)	
CBS	Winter	The Dukes of Hazzard (30/17.2) (Tied with Real People)		Dallas (2/24.6)		Falcon Crest (8/20.7)	
CBS	Spring	The Dukes of Hazzard (30/17.2) (Tied with Real People)		Dallas (2/24.6)		**The Mississippi**	
CBS	Summer	The Dukes of Hazzard (30/17.2) (Tied with Real People)		Dallas (2/24.6)		Falcon Crest (R)	
NBC	Fall	**The Powers of Matthew Star**		**Knight Rider**		**Remington Steele**	
NBC	Winter	**The Powers of Matthew Star**		**Knight Rider**		**Remington Steele**	
NBC	Spring	**The Powers of Matthew Star**		**Knight Rider**		**Bare Essence**	
NBC	Summer	**The Powers of Matthew Star**		**Knight Rider**		Eischied (R)	

Note: On NBC, Eischied consisted of reruns of the network's 1979-80 crime drama series.

== Saturday ==
Network		8:00 PM	8:30 PM	9:00 PM	9:30 PM	10:00 PM	10:30 PM
ABC		T. J. Hooker		The Love Boat (9/20.3)		Fantasy Island	
CBS	Fall	Walt Disney		The CBS Saturday Night Movie			
CBS	Winter	Walt Disney		The CBS Saturday Night Movie			
CBS	Spring	**Wizards and Warriors**		The CBS Saturday Night Movie			
CBS	Summer	**Wizards and Warriors**		The CBS Saturday Night Movie			
NBC	Fall	Diff'rent Strokes	**Silver Spoons**	Gimme a Break!	Love, Sidney	**The Devlin Connection**	
NBC	Winter	Diff'rent Strokes	**Silver Spoons**	**Mama's Family**	Taxi	**The Family Tree**	
NBC	Spring	Diff'rent Strokes	**Silver Spoons**	**Mama's Family**	Teachers Only	**Monitor**	
NBC	Summer	Diff'rent Strokes	**Silver Spoons**	Quincy, M.E. (R)		**Monitor**	
NBC	Late summer	Diff'rent Strokes	**Silver Spoons**	Quincy, M.E. (R)		**Casablanca**	

== By network ==
=== ABC ===
**Returning Series**

- 20/20
- 9 to 5
- The ABC Friday Night Movie
- The ABC Monday Night Movie
- ABC NFL Monday Night Football
- The ABC Sunday Night Movie
- Benson
- Dynasty
- The Fall Guy
- Fantasy Island
- The Greatest American Hero
- Happy Days
- Hart to Hart
- Joanie Loves Chachi
- Laverne & Shirley
- The Love Boat
- Monday Night Baseball
- T. J. Hooker
- That's Incredible!
- Three's Company
- Too Close for Comfort

**New Series**

- **The 1/2 Hour Comedy Hour** *
- **Amanda's** *
- **At Ease** *
- **Baby Makes Five** *
- **Condo** *
- **High Performance** *
- **It Takes Two**
- **Life's Most Embarrassing Moments**
- **Matt Houston**
- **The New Odd Couple**
- **The Quest**
- **The Renegades** *
- **Reggie**
- **Ripley's Believe It or Not!**
- **Ryan's Four** *
- **Star of the Family**
- **Tales of the Gold Monkey**

Not returning from 1981–82:

- Barney Miller
- Best of the West
- Bosom Buddies
- Code Red
- Darkroom
- King's Crossing
- Maggie
- Making a Living
- Mork & Mindy
- No Soap, Radio
- Open All Night
- The Phoenix
- Police Squad!
- Strike Force
- Taxi (moved to NBC)
- Today's FBI

=== CBS ===
**Returning Series**

- 60 Minutes
- Alice
- Archie Bunker's Place
- Cagney & Lacey
- Dallas
- The Dukes of Hazzard
- Falcon Crest
- Filthy Rich
- The Jeffersons
- Knots Landing
- M*A*S*H
- Magnum, P.I.
- One Day at a Time
- Private Benjamin
- Simon & Simon
- Trapper John, M.D.
- Walt Disney

**New Series**

- **Ace Crawford, Private Eye** *
- **Bring 'Em Back Alive**
- **Foot in the Door** *
- **Gloria**
- **Goodnight, Beantown** *
- **Gun Shy** *
- **The Mississippi** *
- **Newhart**
- **On the Road with Charles Kuralt**
- **Our Times with Bill Moyers**
- **Seven Brides for Seven Brothers**
- **Small & Frye** *
- **Square Pegs**
- **Tucker's Witch**
- **Wizards and Warriors** *
- **Zorro and Son** *

Not returning from 1981–82:

- Baker's Dozen
- Herbie, the Love Bug
- House Calls
- The Incredible Hulk
- Jessica Novak
- Lou Grant
- Making the Grade
- Mr. Merlin
- Nurse
- Q.E.D.
- Report to Murphy
- The Two of Us
- WKRP in Cincinnati

=== NBC ===
**Returning Series**

- CHiPs
- Diff'rent Strokes
- The Facts of Life
- Fame
- Father Murphy
- Gimme a Break!
- Hill Street Blues
- Little House: A New Beginning @
- Love, Sidney
- NBC Monday Night at the Movies
- Quincy, M.E.
- Real People
- Taxi (moved from ABC)
- Teachers Only *

**New Series**

- **The A-Team** *
- **Bare Essence** *
- **Buffalo Bill** *
- **Casablanca** *
- **Cheers**
- **The Devlin Connection**
- **Family Ties**
- **The Family Tree** *
- **Gavilan**
- **Knight Rider**
- **Mama's Family** *
- **Monitor** *
- **The News Is the News** *
- **The Powers of Matthew Star**
- **Remington Steele**
- **St. Elsewhere**
- **Silver Spoons**
- **Voyagers!**

Not returning from 1981–82:

- Barbara Mandrell and the Mandrell Sisters
- The Billy Crystal Comedy Hour
- Bret Maverick
- Cassie & Co.
- Chicago Story
- Fitz and Bones
- Flamingo Road
- Harper Valley
- Jokebook
- Lewis & Clark
- McClain's Law
- Nashville Palace
- NBC Magazine
- One of the Boys
- Television: Inside and Out

Note: The * indicates that the program was introduced in midseason.

@ Formerly Little House on the Prairie.
