= Gongman =

Trademark/Logo of The Rank Group and The Rank Organisation

- Industry: Logo of The Rank Group and The Rank Organisation
- Founded: 1935 with the GFD logo
- Founder: J. Arthur Rank
- Fate: Active
- Headquarters: United Kingdom
- Products: Logo

The Gongman (also known as the "Man-with-the-Gong") is a company trademark for The Rank Group plc, and previously The Rank Organisation (originally known as the J. Arthur Rank Organisation). It was used as the introduction to all Rank films, many of which were shot at their Pinewood Studios, and included those Rank distributed. The Gongman logo first appeared on films distributed by General Film Distributors, which was established in 1935 by the British producer C. M. Woolf and J. Arthur Rank; it was C.M. Woolf's secretary who thought of the man-with-a-gong trademark. The Man-with-the-Gong was first seen on screen in 1936. When the Rank Organisation was established in 1937, with General Film Distributors as one of its cornerstones, the logo was adopted for the whole organisation. When the company was restructured as The Rank Group in the 1990's, the new successor company continued to use the logo.

The Gongman film logo sequence depicts a man striking a huge gong with a deep resonant sound. The gongs used in the sequence were props made of plaster or papier-mâché. The sound came from James Blades striking a real gong—specifically a Chinese instrument called a tam tam that was much smaller than the prop. During the sequence, the text "General Film Distributors", " J. Arthur Rank Film Distributors", "J. Arthur Rank presents" or "'The Rank Organisation" appeared over the gong.

The first "Gongman" was Carl Dane, a circus strong man who was paid a one-time fee by General Film Distributors. Athletes who played the Gongman in the film sequence over the years included boxer Bombardier Billy Wells, the second "Gongman", who was actually the first contracted by J.A. Rank – a subtle but important difference. In later years this position was filled by wrestler Ken Richmond. Also, George Francis Moss Snr and stunt actor Martin Grace played the Gongman. In 2012, to celebrate the Gongman's 75th anniversary, The Rank Group, the gambling company that in 1996 acquired the remaining business interests of the Rank Organisation as well as the rights to its logo and name, announced a nationwide competition to find a new Gongman for the 21st century, Chris Rowley from Stoke-on-Trent won the competition and is the new official Rank Gongman.

== Parodies/Pastiches ==
The Gongman's recognisability meant it was often parodied.

- In Carry On up the Khyber, Kenneth Williams' character refers to an over-enthusiastic gongman's attitude as "rank stupidity". This was effectively an in-joke as the Carry On films were produced and distributed by the Rank Organisation.
- The opening to the ATV Thursday Picture Show used an animated version. According to Sub-TV, which has a video of the opening, "the gong-smasher here is a non-muscley man in an old-fashioned swimming costume and a cloth cap!" The man hits an ATV logo, not a gong, and the logo smashes into pieces.
- The Mad magazine article "Pizza Pie" (issue #40, July 1958), written and illustrated by longtime contributor Dave Berg, humorously suggests that pizzas may one day be used in the future by the Gongman in lieu of his traditional gong.
- In the E.T. the Extra-Terrestrial spoof El E.T.E. y el OTO, there is a logo at the beginning and end of the film for the company "Manuel Esteba P.C." that shows a muscular man in red briefs hitting a gong that immediately breaks. At the end, he is shown trying to fix the gong, but he fails and cries in frustration.
- The production company ident for American television series Foul-Ups, Bleeps & Blunders had two men that were about ready to strike a gong (a la the "Gongman"), with the man on the right (holding the gong mallet) striking the man on the left in the groin region and leaving him in agony (this was followed by the sound of the gong falling on the floor).
- In the closing seconds of the video to Queen's "Bohemian Rhapsody", percussionist Roger Taylor mimics the Rank gong man by striking a large tam tam whilst stripped to the waist.
- The Bonzo Dog Doo-Dah Band song "The Intro and the Outro" includes a reference to J. Arthur Rank playing the gong in the band's fictional line-up.
- On The Muppets Go to the Movies, the Muppets parody the Gongman with "J. Arthur Link", showing Muppet pig Link Hogthrob in the nude, swinging at the gong, missing, spinning around losing his balance, and hitting the gong with his head.
- In Terry Pratchett's Discworld novel Moving Pictures the gong exists in a temple that is a portal to the Dungeon Dimensions. Standing in for the gongman is a suitably proportioned troll made of living rock.
- The now-defunct Swedish film distributor Triangelfilm had a similar vignette with an animated man hitting a triangle.
- During the Gilligan's Island episode in which the castaways produce a film explaining their situation, Gilligan performs their own version of the Rank logo sequence; when he strikes the gong, he shakes uncontrollably at the vibrations it creates.
- The Hungarian animated movie Macskafogó opens with a round cat's face which a mouse strikes like a gong.
- The title sequence of the Mickey Mouse Club TV show's original run ended with Donald Duck striking a gong, with varying results.
- The opening sequence of Indiana Jones and the Temple of Doom has the Paramount Pictures logo fade into a similar image of a mountain imprinted on a gong, which is then struck by a gongman. Later on the title character and his love interest use the gong as a shield and means of escape from an attacking gangster.
- In the Pasadena Jones segment of the Tiny Toon Adventures episode Cinemaniacs, the opening after the prelude shows Hamton J. Pig swinging at the gong and ringing it.
- An Extremely Goofy Movie opens with Goofy striking a gong with a heavy drumstick. Afterward, the gong falls on his foot, causing him to yell in pain, and it falls over to reveal the title of the movie on the backside.
- In series 3 of the British comedy game show Taskmaster, comedian Al Murray recreates the logo sequence as part of a task requiring contestants to "do something that looks brilliant when sped up or slowed down". When doing so, he strikes the gong with such force that a wig he is wearing falls off, to his surprise.
- Jack Webb's production company Mark VII Limited used an ident sequence of a strong man's hands stamping the "VII" into a steel plate with one or two ringing blows; Webb freely admitted that the Gongman sequence was the direct inspiration.
