= Partners in Crime (American TV series) =

American crime drama television series

- Genre: Crime drama
- Created by: William Driskill
- Starring: Lynda Carter; Loni Anderson; Leo Rossi; Eileen Heckart; Walter Olkewicz
- Theme music composer: Johnny Harris
- Composer: Nathan Sassover
- Country of origin: United States
- Original language: English
- No. of seasons: 1
- No. of episodes: 13

Production
- Executive producer: William Driskill
- Producers: Jonathan Bernstein; Everett Chambers
- Production company: Carson Productions

Original release
- Network: NBC
- Release: September 22 – December 29, 1984

Partners in Crime is an American crime drama television series set in San Francisco, California, created by William Driskill, that aired on NBC from September 27 to December 29, 1984, during the 1984–85 U.S. television season. NBC cancelled the show after 13 episodes. It was screened overseas as Fifty/Fifty, to avoid confusion with the British series Agatha Christie's Partners in Crime also shown on ITV in the United Kingdom.

== Overview ==
The series starred Lynda Carter as Carole Stanwyck and Loni Anderson as Sydney Kovack, two women with little in common except sharing Raymond as an ex-husband. When Raymond winds up murdered, Carole and Sydney set out to find his killer and eventually decide to run the detective agency Raymond has left them. They were assisted in their efforts by Raymond's assistant (Walter Olkewicz), Raymond's mother (Eileen Heckart), and Lt. Vronsky (Leo Rossi).

== Cast ==
- Lynda Carter as Carole Stanwyck
- Loni Anderson as Sydney Kovack
- Walter Olkewicz as Harmon Shain
- Leo Rossi as Lt. Ed Vronsky
- Eileen Heckart as Jeanine

== Episodes ==
No.	Title	Directed by	Written by	Original release date	Prod. code
1	"Celebrity"	Sigmund Neufeld, Jr.	Story by : Robert Van Scoyk; Teleplay by : Bill Driskill	September 22, 1984	780-04
The women are hired to protect a rock singer from a crazed stalker but the ladies wind up seeing double. Guest star Vanessa Williams.
2	"The Hottest Guy in Town"	Charles S. Dubin	Story by : Simon Muntner & Bill Driskill; Teleplay by : Simon Muntner	September 29, 1984	780-03
Wealthy women are being blackmailed by a hairdresser. Carole and Sydney go undercover to root out the blackmailer. Guest star David Soul.
3	"Murder in the Museum"	Rod Daniel	April Kelly	October 6, 1984	780-14
An assistant curator of a museum, who was very good friends with Carole, is found murdered. Guest Star Leigh McCloskey.
4	"Pilot"	Harry Falk & Leonard B. Stern	James Stark	October 13, 1984	780-01
Two women discover that they have inherited a detective agency after their ex-husband has been murdered in his office. Guest stars John Beck, Susan Kellermann and John Schuck. Note: Two-hour episode.
5	"Duke"	Lee H. Katzin	Harold Stone	October 20, 1984	780-08
While Carole attends a seminar, Sydney gets involved with her con artist father "Duke" to clear his name surrounding the theft of a bronze statue and the murder of the thief. Guest star Cameron Mitchell and James Sloyan.
6	"Paddles Up"	James Sheldon	William Driskill	October 27, 1984	780-06
A man who has the winning bid for a jewel has been killed and people are now out to get the jewel. Guest star David Carradine
7	"Is She or Isn't He?"	Guy Magar	Larry Brody & Janis Hendler	November 3, 1984	780-13
Carole and Sydney investigate a kidnapping of a rich mans son. Guest star Christopher Morley and John Sanderford.
8	"Fantasyland"	Sutton Roley	Gina Goldman	November 24, 1984	780-15
One of Sydney's childhood friends has been murdered and the teen he promised to protect from the streets is out on her own. While Carole goes undercover at an adult venue, Sydney works behind to scenes to uncover the killer. Guest stars David Hedison and Donna Wilkes.
9	"The Set-Up"	James Sheldon	Story by : Bill Driskill; Teleplay by : Simon Muntner	December 1, 1984	780-17
Lt. Vronsky is being investigated for murder and embezzlement. Guest stars Michael Shannon and Robert Colbert.
10	"Fashioned for Murder"	Don Weis	Story by : Jayne Ehrlich; Teleplay by : Jayne Ehrlich & Simon Muntner	December 8, 1984	780-07
Carole and Sydney try to catch a design thief and murderer by posing as models. Guest stars Kaz Garas and Patricia McCormack.
11	"The Strangler"	Allan Reisner	Story by : Simon Muntner & Larry Brody; Teleplay by : Simon Muntner & Larry Brody and Philip Saltzman	December 15, 1984	780-12
Carole and Syd investigate the identity of a strangler who leaves red handkerchiefs around the necks of his victims. Guest stars John Vernon and Bibi Besch.
12	"Getting in Shape"	Kevin Connor	Story by : John Stern; Teleplay by : Larry Brody	December 22, 1984	780-02
Two lovers are being blackmailed at a health resort.
13	"Double Jeopardy"	Alan Cooke	Donald Ross	December 29, 1984	780-20
Carole and Syd are taken hostage by escaped convicts.
