= Len Cella =

American film actor and director (1937–2023)

- Born: Clement Leonard Cella; June 29, 1937; United States
- Died: December 24, 2023 (aged 86); Broomall, Pennsylvania, U.S.
- Occupations: Film director, actor, writer, film producer

Clement Leonard Cella (June 29, 1937 – December 24, 2023) was an American film actor and director. His most recognized works are Moron Movies and More Moron Movies, which are collections of short comedy films ranging in time from five seconds to almost a minute. Among the short films are such titles as "Disguise Class," "The Shy Bra Salesman," "How to Stop a Mugger," and "Bob The Magician."

The films gained popularity and caught the attention of The Tonight Show Starring Johnny Carson. Moron Movies were a regular feature on the show from 1983 to 1985.

After The Tonight Show, Cella's work was shown on Dick Clark's TV's Bloopers & Practical Jokes under the name Len Cella's Silly Cinemas, a moniker that Cella disliked.

In 1987 Cella published a book entitled Things to Worry About (In Case You Run Out).

Cella died as a result of injuries sustained in a pedestrian-road collision on December 24, 2023. He was 86.
