= General Film Distributors =

British film releasing firm

Opening logo

General Film Distributors (GFD), later known as J. Arthur Rank Film Distributors and Rank Film Distributors Ltd., was a British film distribution company based in London. It was active between 1935 and 1996, and from 1937 it was part of the Rank Organisation.

== History ==
General Film Distributors was created in 1935 by the British film distributor C. M. Woolf (1879–1942), J. Arthur Rank and the paper magnate Lord Portal following Gaumont British's poor handling of Rank's first film Turn of the Tide (1935). Woolf had resigned from Gaumont British and closed his distribution company Woolf & Freedman Film Service. C.M. Woolf's secretary devised the company's Man-with-a-Gong trademark which was later adopted by The Rank Organisation when it was founded in 1937.

In 1936, General Cinema Finance Corporation (GCFC) was formed and became the parent company of GFD as well as acquiring shares in Universal Pictures, giving it the British distribution rights for all Universal titles. One year later GFD became the cornerstone in The Rank Organisation.

In 1941, GCFC bought control of Metropolis and Bradford Trust giving the group control of Gaumont-British Picture Corporation. In 1944, D & P Holdings was formed as a subsidiary of GCFC to acquire British and Dominions Film Corporation.

GFD kept its own name within the Rank Organisation until 1955, when it was renamed J. Arthur Rank Film Distributors, which in turn was renamed Rank Film Distributors Ltd. in 1957. During the 20 years GFD had its original name, the company distributed over 450 mainstream films.

Rank Film Distributors was acquired by Carlton Communications in 1997 and closed.

A British DVD distributor, active since 2005, uses the same name, but as a DVD distributor, GFD is possibly related to the original company.
