= Foul-Ups, Bleeps & Blunders =

Title for a television show that ran by ABC

Foul-Ups, Bleeps & Blunders is the title of a comedy series that aired on ABC for two short seasons in the mid-1980s. The series was hosted by Steve Lawrence and Don Rickles and produced by Bob Booker. The series theme song was performed by Billy May and the show music was composed by Kevin Kiner.

Produced as a response to NBC's TV's Bloopers & Practical Jokes, this series similarly focused on outtakes from popular television programs and movies. The series also included a Candid Camera-like segment showing people caught in amusing situations by hidden cameras. The word blooper was not allowed to be uttered, with the term "foul-up" substituted where applicable. (During the 1980s, ABC dabbled with the same format with a similar series of specials hosted separately by John Ritter and Steve Allen, titled Life's Most Embarrassing Moments.)

The series debuted on January 10, 1984 as a mid-season replacement series for Just Our Luck, and returned at the start of the 1984-85 season, however after October 1984 the show ceased to be a weekly offering on ABC and instead aired at various times as filler for the next few months before resuming weekly broadcast in the spring, after which it was cancelled. The network was nervous having Don Rickles, known for his personal insults, as a co-host. Fearful of offending their audience with condescending humor, ABC had the producers reshoot sections for the first episode without Rickles. The irony was that the series' initial audience ratings were huge just because of that fact; people tuning in to see what Rickles was going to say. But once the network muzzled Don’s humor, people tuned out and the show barely lasted two seasons.

The most notable episode of Foul-Ups, Bleeps & Blunders featured guest star William Shatner introducing a set of bloopers taken from the original Star Trek. Shatner, in his introduction, stated that this was the first time these outtakes had ever been shown on network television. ("I've got chills," Rickles replied, sarcastically.)

After the closing credits, the Bob Booker Production logo had two men that were about ready to strike a gong (a la the Rank Organisation's "Gongman"), with the man on the right (holding the gong mallet) striking the man on the left in the groin region and leaving him in agony (this was followed by a gong sound).
