= Maggie Briggs =

- Also known as: Suzanne Pleshette Is Maggie Briggs
- Genre: Sitcom
- Created by: Charlie Hauck; Suzanne Pleshette
- Starring: Suzanne Pleshette; Kenneth McMillian; Shera Danese; John Getz
- Composer: Patrick Williams
- Country of origin: United States
- Original language: English
- No. of seasons: 1
- No. of episodes: 6

Production
- Camera setup: Multi-camera
- Running time: 30 minutes
- Production companies: Chagrin Productions; Lorimar Productions

Original release
- Network: CBS
- Release: March 4 – April 15, 1984

Suzanne Pleshette Is Maggie Briggs is an American sitcom that aired on CBS from March 4 to April 15, 1984.

== Premise ==
Maggie Briggs is a reporter at The New York Examiner who is demoted from working on feature stories to writing human interest pieces.

== Cast ==
- Suzanne Pleshette as Maggie Briggs
- Kenneth McMillan as Walter Holden
- Shera Danese as Connie Piscipoli
- Stephen Lee as Sherman Milslagle
- John Getz as Geoff Bennett
- Alison La Placa as Melanie Bitterman
- Roger Bowen as Danny Bauer
- Michelle Nicastro as Diane Barstow

== Ratings ==
Season	Start date	End date	Nielsen rank	Nielsen rating
1983-84	March 4, 1984	April 15, 1984	53	15.0 (Note: Tied with "Silver Spoons" and "Shaping Up")

== Episodes ==
No.	Title	Directed by	Written by	Original release date
1	"Maggie Meets Geoff"	Peter Bonerz	Charlie Hauck	March 4, 1984
Maggie finds out that Walter has accepted a position in her department.
2	"Wrong, Bad, Dumb, Stinks"	Peter Bonerz	Charlie Hauck	March 11, 1984
Maggie makes a return to reporting hard news after all her story ideas have been shot down.
3	"Roman Holiday"	Peter Bonerz	Charlie Hauck	March 18, 1984
Walter promises to loan Maggie money for a trip to Rome.
4	"A New Leaf"	Peter Bonerz	Charlie Hauck	March 25, 1984
Maggie promises not to interfere in Connie's dating life.
5	"Double Date"	Peter Bonerz	Bob Ellison & Tom Whedon	April 1, 1984
Maggie goes out on a date with a reporter from a rival paper.
6	"Maggie's Theatre Review"	Peter Bonerz	Charlie Hauck	April 15, 1984
Maggie finds out who wrote the play she just reviewed.
