= Empire (1984 TV series) =

- Genre: Sitcom; Satire
- Created by: Lawrence J. Cohen; Fred Freeman
- Starring: Dennis Dugan
- Composer: Patrick Williams
- Country of origin: United States
- Original language: English
- No. of seasons: 1
- No. of episodes: 6

Production
- Executive producers: Lawrence J. Cohen; Fred Freeman
- Camera setup: Multi-camera
- Running time: 30 minutes
- Production companies: Humble Productions; MGM/UA Entertainment Co. Television

Original release
- Network: CBS
- Release: January 4 – February 1, 1984

Empire is an American comedy television series that aired from January 4 until February 1, 1984.

== Premise ==
This series is a satire of corporate life set at Empire Industries.

== Cast ==
- Dennis Dugan as Ben Christian
- Patrick Macnee as Calvin Cromwell
- Maureen Arthur as Peg
- Christine Belford as Jackie Willow
- Caren Kaye as Meredith
- Richard Masur as Jack Willow
- Michael McGuire as Edward Roland
- Dick O'Neill as Arthur Broderick
- Howard Platt as Roger Martinson
- Edward Winter as T. Howard Daniels
- Patricia Elliott as Renee
- Paul Wilson as Bill
- Francine Tacker as Amelia Lapidus

== Episodes ==
No.	Title	Directed by	Written by	Original release date
1	"Episode 1"	Terry Hughes	Lawrence J. Cohen & Fred Freeman	January 4, 1984
2	"Episode 2"	Terry Hughes	Lawrence J. Cohen & Fred Freeman	January 11, 1984
3	"Episode 3"	Terry Hughes	Lawrence J. Cohen & Fred Freeman	January 18, 1984
4	"Episode 4"	Terry Hughes	Story by : Lawrence J. Cohen & Fred Freeman; Teleplay by : George Zateslo	January 25, 1984
5	"Episode 5"	Terry Hughes	Lawrence J. Cohen, Fred Freeman, Dennis Danziger and Ellen Sandler	February 1, 1984
6	"Episode 6"	Terry Hughes	Jim Geoghan	February 1, 1984

== US television ratings ==
Season	Episodes	Start date	End date	Nielsen rank	Nielsen rating
1983-84	6	January 4, 1984	February 1, 1984	88	10.5
