= Domestic Life (TV series) =

- Genre: Sitcom
- Created by: Steve Martin; Martin Mull; Howard Gerwirtz; Ian Praiser
- Starring: Martin Mull; Judith-Marie Bergan; Robert Ridgely; Christian Brackett-Zika
- Theme music composer: Wendy Haas-Mull
- Opening theme: "God Bless the Domestic Life" performed by Martin Mull
- Composer: David Michael Frank
- Country of origin: United States
- No. of seasons: 1
- No. of episodes: 10 (1 unaired)

Production
- Executive producer: Steve Martin
- Producers: Ian Praiser; Howard Gewirtz
- Running time: 30 minutes
- Production companies: 40 Share Productions; Universal Television

Original release
- Network: CBS
- Release: January 4 – April 15, 1984

Domestic Life is an American sitcom that aired on CBS from January 4 to April 15, 1984. Reruns continued until September 11, 1984. Steve Martin served as executive producer.

== Plot ==
Martin Crane moved to Seattle to take a commentator job at KMRT-TV. His spot on the station's evening news was called "Domestic Life". Others in the cast were Martin's wife Candy, his 15-year-old daughter Didi, and 10-year-old son Harold.

== Production ==
Steve Martin and Martin Mull were friends who met doing stand-up. Martin suggested they try to pitch a sitcom starring Mull. The first idea was to do a show about a politician who gets elected to Washington, but NBC passed. They then came up with a Father Knows Best style show. Mull called the show "a gentle spoof of family sitcom cliches." NBC did not want to make it but CBS agreed to make six episodes.

Mull said he wanted his character to talk to the camera like George Burns. "We (he and Martin) thought one of my strengths might be as a monologuist, talking right to the camera. So we tried to figure out what kind of occupation a character could have where he could talk right down the barrel. That's why we chose a television commentator."

There were many unintentional similarities between Domestic Life and Frasier which premiered nine years later. Both series were set in Seattle with a character named Martin Crane, and both featured a character broadcasting an advice show. David Angell, who co-created Frasier, was a writer on Domestic Life.

The show began in January as a mid-season replacement. Country singer-songwriter Hoyt Axton made a guest appearance in the show's fifth episode ("Harold, Can You Spare $4,000?").

Reviewing the opening episode the New York Times said "The tone is right, the cast is about perfect and the result is often quite funny".

Ratings were not strong and the show was cancelled. Mull said "I think the only reason they canceled us, since television is a business, was because we weren't getting the numbers. Some perfectly dreadful things get big ratings, so go figure. CBS kept moving us around and people couldn't find us. I think people tend to plan their viewing."

Martin Mull later recalled:

I believe we were voted by Time as one of the top 10 shows of the year on the same day CBS canceled us. And the other thing that sticks in my mind, other than just having a ball doing it, because it was my first starring role, was that Tom Hanks was our warm-up man. He would warm up the audience for us. I don’t know whatever happened to that kid, but he was very good at that.

== Cast ==
- Martin Mull as Martin Crane
- Judith-Marie Bergan as Candy Crane
- Christian Brackett-Zika as Harold Crane
- Megan Follows as Didi Crane
- Robert Ridgely as Cliff Hamilton
- Mie Hunt as Jane Funakubo

== US television ratings ==
Season	Episodes	Start date	End date	Nielsen rank	Nielsen rating	Tied with
1983–84	10	January 4, 1984	April 15, 1984	69	13.4	N/A

== Episodes ==
No.	Title	Directed by	Written by	Original release date
1	"Harold in Love"	Will Mackenzie	Howard Gewirtz & Ian Praiser	January 4, 1984
2	"Small Cranes Court"	Michael Lessac	Howard Gewirtz & Ian Praiser	January 11, 1984
3	"Good Neighbor Cliff"	Will Mackenzie	Jack Carrerow	January 18, 1984
4	"He Ain't Heavy, He's My Dentist"	Jim Drake	Howard Gewirtz & Ian Praiser	January 25, 1984
5	"Harold, Can You Spare $4,000?"	Jim Drake	Howard Gewirtz & Ian Praiser	February 1, 1984
6	"Harold at the Bat"	Will Mackenzie	Howard Gewirtz & Ian Praiser	March 18, 1984
7	"Cooking with Candy"	Sam Weisman	Lisa A. Bannick	March 25, 1984
8	"Rip Rides Again"	Jim Drake	Howard Gewirtz & Ian Praiser	April 1, 1984
9	"The Candidates"	Jim Drake	Lisa A. Bannick & Jack Carrerow	Unaired
10	"Showdown at Walla Walla"	Jim Drake	David Angell	April 15, 1984

== Bibliography ==
- Tim Brooks and Earle Marsh, The Complete Directory to Prime Time Network and Cable TV Shows 1946–Present, Ninth edition (New York: Ballantine Books, 2007) ISBN 978-0-345-49773-4
