= Mr. Smith (TV series) =

American sitcom

- Promotional photo for Mr. Smith
- Genre: Sitcom
- Created by: Stan Daniels; Ed. Weinberger
- Written by: Dari Daniels; George Kirgo; David Lloyd; Douglas Wyman
- Directed by: Stan Daniels; Ralph Helfer; Gerald Hirschfeld; Ed. Weinberger
- Starring: Leonard Frey; Tim Dunigan; Terri Garber; Laura Jacoby; Stuart Margolin
- Voices of: Ed. Weinberger
- Composer: Patrick Williams
- Country of origin: United States
- Original language: English
- No. of seasons: 1
- No. of episodes: 13

Production
- Executive producers: Stan Daniels; Ed. Weinberger
- Producer: Ralph Helfer
- Running time: 30 minutes
- Production companies: Weinberger/Daniels Productions; Paramount Television

Original release
- Network: NBC
- Release: September 23 – December 16, 1983

Mr. Smith is an American sitcom that aired on Fridays at 8:00 pm ET on NBC from September 23 through December 16, 1983. The title character was a talking orangutan. Mr. Smith was canceled after thirteen episodes had been aired.

The orangutan who played Mr. Smith had previously been featured in the 1978 film Every Which Way but Loose and its 1980 sequel Any Which Way You Can.

== Synopsis ==
Originally a part of a traveling act called the Atwood Orangutans, Cha Cha and Bobo are separated from their trainer, Tommy Atwood (Tim Dunigan), after he is knocked unconscious in a car accident while the act is traveling from Arizona to California. Frightened by the commotion caused by the accident, Cha Cha and Bobo both run away. Cha Cha is eventually found and sent to a government research center in Washington, D.C. Weeks later, Cha Cha escapes from the center and ends up in a research lab where he discovers an experimental mixture to increase human intelligence that is being developed. After drinking the mixture, Cha Cha can talk (his voice was provided by series executive producer Ed. Weinberger) and is later determined to have an I.Q of 256. He is then renamed Mr. Smith and, due to his high intelligence, becomes a political adviser. Mr. Smith's old trainer, Tommy, later becomes his assistant. At the same time, Mr. Smith attempts to solve various political problems, and his staff, which includes his secretary, Raymond Holyoke (Leonard Frey), attempts to keep his identity hidden from the general public.

Mr. Smith's premiere episode brought in a weak 12.1/22 rating/share and ranked 47th out of 57 shows that week and was panned by critics. Viewership decreased as the season progressed, and the series was canceled (along with seven other NBC series) on December 14, 1983.

== Cast ==
- Leonard Frey as Raymond Holyoke
- Tim Dunigan as Tommy Atwood
- Terri Garber as Dr. July Tyson
- Laura Jacoby as Ellie Atwood
- Stuart Margolin as Dr. Klein
- Isabel Cooley as Nurse

== US television ratings ==
Viewership and ratings per season of Show
Season	Episodes	First aired		Last aired		TV season	Viewership rank	Ref.
Season	Episodes	Date	Viewers (millions)	Date	Viewers (millions)	TV season	Viewership rank	Ref.
1	13	September 23, 1983	TBD	December 16, 1983	TBD	1983-84	95	

== Episode list ==
No.	Title	Directed by	Written by	Original release date
1	"Welcome to Washington: Part 1"	Unknown	Unknown	September 23, 1983
2	"Welcome to Washington: Part 2"	Unknown	Unknown	September 23, 1983
3	"Mr. Smith Finds His Brother"	Unknown	Unknown	September 30, 1983
4	"Mr. Smith Operates"	Ed. Weinberger	David Lloyd	October 14, 1983
5	"Mr. Smith Rescues Bobo"	Gerald Hirschfeld	Al Aidekman	October 21, 1983
6	"Mr. Smith Falls in Love"	Gerald Hirschfeld	David Lloyd	October 28, 1983
7	"Mr. Smith Gets Physical"	Unknown	Unknown	November 4, 1983
8	"Goodbye, Mr. Smith"	Unknown	Unknown	November 11, 1983
9	"Mr. Smith Loses a Friend"	Unknown	Unknown	November 18, 1983
10	"Mr. Smith Plays Cyrano"	Unknown	Unknown	November 25, 1983
11	"Mr. Smith Makes a Commercial"	Unknown	Unknown	December 2, 1983
12	"Mr. Smith Goes Public"	Unknown	Unknown	December 16, 1983
13	"Mr. Smith Goes to Court"	TBD	TBD	1983 or Unaired?

== Awards and nominations ==
Year	Award	Category	Nominee(s)	Result	Ref.
1984	Emmy Award	Outstanding Achievement in Music Composition for a Series (Dramatic Underscore)	Patrick Williams (For episode "Mr. Smith Falls in Love")	Nominated	
1984	Young Artist Awards	Best Young Actress in a New Television Series	Laura Jacoby	Nominated	
1984	Young Artist Awards	Best New Television Series	Mr. Smith	Nominated	
1985	Young Artist Awards	Best Young Actress in a New Television Series	Laura Jacoby	Nominated	
