= Legmen =

American drama television series

- Genre: Drama
- Created by: Bill Dial; Andrew Mirisch
- Starring: Bruce Greenwood; John Terlesky
- Country of origin: United States
- Original language: English
- No. of seasons: 1
- No. of episodes: 8

Production
- Running time: 60 minutes
- Production company: Universal Television

Original release
- Network: NBC
- Release: January 20 – September 1, 1984

Legmen is an American drama television series that aired on NBC on Friday nights from January 20 to March 16, 1984, with an additional leftover episode airing on September 1, 1984.

== Premise ==
Jack Gage and David Taylor were two college students in southern California, who to make extra money did the legwork for private eye Oscar Armismendi, and in later episodes Tom Bannon.

== Cast ==
- Bruce Greenwood as Jack Gage
- John Terlesky as David Taylor
- Don Calfa as Oscar Armismendi
- Claude Akins as Tom Bannon

== Episodes ==
No.	Title	Directed by	Written by	Original release date
1	"Take the Credit and Run"	Roger Young	S : Andrew Mirisch; S/T : Richard Chapman, Bill Dial	January 20, 1984
2	"Knight at Casanova's"	Unknown	Unknown	January 27, 1984
3	"The Return of Apple Dan Bonny"	Unknown	Unknown	February 3, 1984
4	"I Shall Be Re-Released"	Unknown	Unknown	February 17, 1984
5	"Poseidon Indenture"	Unknown	Unknown	March 2, 1984
6	"Still Alive at Five"	Unknown	Unknown	March 9, 1984
7	"How the Other Half Dies"	Allen Reisner	Richard Chapman, Bill Dial	March 16, 1984
8	"A Woman's Work"	Unknown	Unknown	September 1, 1984

== US television ratings ==
Season	Episodes	Start date	End date	Nielsen rank	Nielsen rating	Tied with
1983-84	8	January 20, 1984	September 1, 1984	98	8.5	N/A
