= Two Marriages =

American dramatic television series

- Genre: Drama
- Created by: Carol Sobieski
- Starring: Michael Murphy; Tom Mason; Karen Carlson; Ina Fried; Tiffany Toyoshima; C. Thomas Howell; Janet Eilber; Kirk Cameron; Louanne; John McLiam
- Theme music composer: Bruce Broughton; Dory Previn
- Opening theme: "Home Here" performed by Jerry Fuller
- Composer: Peter Myers
- Country of origin: United States
- Original language: English
- No. of seasons: 1
- No. of episodes: 10

Production
- Executive producer: Philip Capice
- Running time: 60 minutes
- Production companies: Raven's Claw Productions; Lorimar Productions

Original release
- Network: ABC
- Release: August 23, 1983 – April 26, 1984

Two Marriages is an American dramatic television series that aired on ABC from August 23, 1983 until April 26, 1984.

== Premise ==
The Armstrongs and Daleys, two married couples with very different marriages but a close friendship live next-door to each other in suburban Iowa (presumably the Des Moines, Iowa metropolitan area).

Nancy Armstrong is a traditional homemaker whose husband, Art, is a successful, earnest, but occasionally distant and cynical surgeon; their older teenage daughter Shelby is wise beyond her years and yet feels awkward, while their mischievous son Eric is about to enter puberty.

Ann Daley, transplanted from Chicago, is a professional engineer whose husband (her second), Jim, is a down-to-earth dairy farmer; their children include her troubled son Scott Morgan, from her previous broken marriage, who resented the move to Iowa and wanted to return to Chicago, due to his feeling left out in the new family dynamics; Jim's adopted Vietnamese daughter, Kim; and the young son, Willie, Ann and Jim had together.

Willie and Kim bonded beautifully although they weren't blood, and eventually Scott found himself becoming part of the family, thanks to his neighbor, Shelby, who was able to get through to him.

Jim Daley's fun-loving, hard-working father, Woody, who operates the dairy with him, is an active figure in the lives of his biological and adopted grandchildren.

== Cast ==
- Michael Murphy as Dr. Art Armstrong
- Tom Mason as Jim Daley
- Karen Carlson as Ann Daley
- Janet Eilber as Nancy Armstrong
- Ina Fried as Willie Daley
- Tiffany Toyoshima as Kim Daley
- C. Thomas Howell as Scott Morgan
- Kirk Cameron as Eric Armstrong
- Louanne as Shelby Armstrong
- John McLiam as Woody Daley

== US television ratings ==
Season	Episodes	Start date	End date	Nielsen rank	Nielsen rating
1983-84	10	August 23, 1983	April 26, 1984	92	10.0 (Note: Tied with"Bay City Blues")

== Episodes ==
No.	Title	Directed by	Written by	Original release date
1	"Pilot"	Unknown	Unknown	August 23, 1983
2	"Relativity"	Burt Brinckerhoff	Patricia Green	August 31, 1983
3	"Connections"	Unknown	Unknown	September 7, 1983
4	"The Prize"	Unknown	Unknown	September 14, 1983
5	"Choices"	Unknown	Unknown	March 8, 1984
6	"Friendships"	Unknown	Unknown	March 15, 1984
7	"Reflections"	Unknown	Unknown	March 22, 1984
8	"Legacy"	Unknown	Unknown	April 5, 1984
9	TBA	Unknown	Unknown	April 12, 1984
10	"Commitments"	Unknown	Unknown	April 26, 1984
