= TV's Bloopers & Practical Jokes =

- Gail Edwards, Ed McMahon, and Dick Clark, host a 1980s episode of Bloopers
- Also known as: Super Bloopers and Practical Jokes; Super Bloopers & New Practical Jokes; Bloopers
- Genre: Reality Television; Comedy
- Written by: Bryan Michael Stoller; Karl Tiedemann
- Directed by: Bill Davis; Bryan Michael Stoller
- Presented by: Ed McMahon (1982–1993); Dick Clark (1981–2004); Suzanne Whang (1998); Dean Cain (2011–2013)
- Narrated by: Charlie O'Donnell
- Country of origin: United States
- Original language: English

Production
- Running time: 45 minutes (1984–1986, 1991–2007); 22-23 minutes (2011–2013)
- Production companies: Dick Clark Productions; Carson Productions (1984–1998)

Original release
- Network: NBC (1984–1998); ABC (1998–2007); Syndication (2012–2013)
- Release: January 9, 1984 – July 1, 2013

Related
- TV's Censored Bloopers (1981–1984) Television's Greatest Commercials (1982–84)

TV's Bloopers & Practical Jokes is an American television program. Debuting as a weekly series, new episodes have been broadcast as infrequent specials during most of its run. It premiered on NBC in 1984, moved to ABC in 1998, and was revived in syndication in 2012. The NBC run of the series was co-produced by Carson Productions and Dick Clark Productions (Known in the end credits as the C&C Joint Venture), and the ABC and syndication runs have been produced solely by Dick Clark Productions.

== TV's Censored Bloopers and Television's Greatest Commercials ==
The series was predated by two separate series of specials, one devoted to television and film bloopers—humorous errors made during the production of film and television programs, or on live news broadcasts—and the other a series of specials featuring classic television commercials. The TV's Censored Bloopers specials were hosted by longtime TV producer Dick Clark starting on May 15, 1981 (and were dedicated to 1950s TV producer Kermit Schaefer, who had pioneered the concept of preserving bloopers), and the Television's Greatest Commercials specials, which started on May 25, 1982, were hosted by Ed McMahon (which he continued to co-host even as he moved on to co-host the weekly Bloopers series). Both sets of specials garnered high ratings, and following a combination special (TV's Greatest Censored Commercial Bloopers), in the winter of 1984 it was decided to combine the two programs into one series, hosted by Clark and McMahon. Charlie O'Donnell (who was also Clark's announcer on American Bandstand from 1958 to 1968) would be added as announcer (to intro both McMahon and Clark, and to announce bloopers in the "Coming up next" bumpers).

== Regular features ==
Besides dividing the series between bloopers and classic TV advertisements of yesteryear, the original version of the show also featured at least two practical joke segments per episode, with celebrities caught in Candid Camera-like situations (a forerunner of the later series Punk'd). Like the blooper and commercial segments, the "practical jokes" were first seen in a television special, Johnny Carson's Greatest Practical Jokes—hence Carson Productions' involvement in the series.

Other regular features included:

- Man-in-the-street interviews (sometimes supplemented by child-in-the-street interviews), conducted by David Letterman and, later, Robert Klein.
- Video segments featuring songs played behind real-life scenes that gave an ironic twist to the lyrics.
- Len Cella's "Silly Cinemas", a series of absurd short films.
- Thom Sharp's "Book of Hollywood", a tour of unusual sights of the city.
- Wil Shriner's Video Vault, where various humorous video clips were screened.
- Stand-up comedy performances, including appearances by Jerry Seinfeld and Jenny Jones.
- Throughout its entire run on both NBC and ABC, the series featured animated inserts by cartoonist Sergio Aragones, who is known for the comic book series Groo and his contributions to Mad Magazine.

As the original two-year weekly run of the series progressed, adjustments were made to the format and eventually the commercials were phased out, along with other segments, leaving only the bloopers and practical jokes.

== Return to specials format ==
The weekly series ended in 1986. In 1988, Clark revived it as a series of specials retitled as Super Bloopers and New Practical Jokes, and returned with McMahon as co-hosts. Titles of the specials included TV's Censored Bloopers in 1993, and simply Bloopers, as the practical joke element was ultimately dropped. These specials aired irregularly on NBC until as late as 1998, often appearing as "filler" for cancelled series, and acting as a low-cost summer replacement series; the series even briefly returned to a weekly format in 1998 (as TV Censored Bloopers 98) with Suzanne Whang as co-host. The specials often drew a larger audience than their competition, which consisted mainly of reruns.

In the later years of the series' run on NBC, the bloopers shown tended to be drawn mostly from programs produced by NBC.

From 2000 until 2002, The NBC specials reran daily on TNN shortly after they became "The National Network."

== Move to ABC ==
In 1998, Clark moved the series to ABC. New specials aired periodically until 2004, when Clark suffered a stroke. ABC continued to air reruns of these specials until 2006, and they frequently appeared on TBS as well, mainly in the graveyard slot as filler to bring the schedule back into kilter at the start of the broadcast day after the end of Turner Sports coverage in primetime. As with the specials from the later years at NBC, the ABC specials mostly focused on outtakes from series produced by ABC itself, or from productions of The Walt Disney Company, which owned ABC. In addition, logos of networks other than ABC, and of stations affiliated with those networks, were obscured.

In March 2007, ABC aired the special Celebrity A-List Bloopers, produced by Dick Clark Productions, with John O'Hurley as host in Clark's place.

== Syndicated revival ==
In the fall of 2012, the series was revived by Dick Clark Productions and Trifecta Entertainment & Media under the title Bloopers, in a half-hour, syndicated format, airing twice per week. Dean Cain hosted the series and comedian Jack Vale starred in the hidden camera pranks and acts as co-producer. Instead of television and movie outtakes, this incarnation of the series focused on web and user-generated content. However, the practical joke segments in the vein of Candid Camera, which were dropped from the series during the time of the NBC specials, had been reintroduced.

== Imitator series ==
The show sparked a number of imitators on other networks. After the original TV's Censored Bloopers specials aired, Life's Most Embarrassing Moments, a similar series of specials produced by Alan Landsburg Productions, debuted on ABC in 1983. Dick Clark Productions then sued Alan Landsburg Productions over it in federal court. The case was eventually dismissed, and the dismissal was affirmed on appeal. The trial court concluded that copyright protections do not protect the format of a show: "The format of the two shows look similar, but so do the formats of virtually every television news show. The 'look' of a show is not the proper subject of copyright protection."

Foul-Ups, Bleeps & Blunders then made its debut on ABC in 1984. That show aired bloopers from Star Trek for the first time on American network television. However, Foul-ups, Bleeps & Blunders never matched the ratings of Bloopers.

After Bloopers left NBC, the network launched its own similar series, Most Outrageous Moments, which lasted until 2009.
