= Bay City Blues =

American comedy-drama series (1983)

- Genre: Comedy drama; Sports
- Created by: Steven Bochco; Jeffrey Lewis
- Starring: Michael Nouri; Pat Corley; Ken Olin; Dennis Franz; Sharon Stone
- Composer: Mike Post
- Country of origin: United States
- Original language: English
- No. of seasons: 1
- No. of episodes: 8

Production
- Executive producers: Steven Bochco; Gregory Hoblit
- Producers: Jeffrey Wallace; Rick Wallace
- Production location: Pacoima, Los Angeles, California
- Camera setup: Single-camera
- Running time: 45–48 minutes
- Production company: MTM Enterprises

Original release
- Network: NBC
- Release: October 25, 1983 – July 8, 1984

Bay City Blues is an American comedy-drama television series that aired on NBC from October 25 to November 15, 1983. The series stars Michael Nouri, Dennis Franz, and Pat Corley, and was created and produced by Steven Bochco. Eight episodes were produced, but only four were aired prior to its cancellation.

== Synopsis ==
Bay City Blues centers on a Bay City, California minor league baseball team, the Bluebirds. Players varied from young hopefuls to once-great players who were sent to the minors before retirement. Storylines revolve around the players' lives, loves, and problems. Bay City Blues features an ensemble cast of regulars including a then-unknown Sharon Stone, Mykelti Williamson and Dennis Franz.

The series from producer Steven Bochco utilized many actors who had appeared on Hill Street Blues including Franz, Jurasik, Corley and Rodriguez. After the series' cancellation, Ken Olin joined Hill Street Blues cast in the fall of 1984 and Mykelti Williamson appeared in a recurring role. Michael Nouri, fresh off his starring role as Nick Hurley in the successful motion picture Flashdance, portrayed Joe Rohner, the Bluebirds' kindly manager. His love interest on the show was played by Kelly Harmon (whose brother, Mark, was starring simultaneously on another NBC drama, St. Elsewhere).

Franz joined the cast of Hill Street Blues in the fall of 1985, and Michele Greene was cast in another Bochco show, L.A. Law, when it premiered in the fall of 1986.

== Filming ==
Filming took place in a parking lot in Pacoima, a neighborhood town in Los Angeles, California. Production for Bay City Blues was started in August 1983.

== Broadcast ==
Scheduled opposite ABC's Hart to Hart and CBS's Tuesday Night Movies, Bay City Blues drew poor ratings and was pulled from NBC's lineup after airing four of the eight episodes that were produced at 10 pm. The four remaining episodes were aired by selected affiliates in two-hour blocks on Sunday July 1 and Sunday July 8, 1984, after the local news broadcasts. The prime-time run ended up ranking 93rd out of 101 programs, averaging only a 10 household rating and a 17 percent audience share.

The remaining four episodes had not been seen again in prime-time until 2011, when ESPN Classic acquired the rights to the series and aired all eight episodes.

== Cast ==
- Michael Nouri as Joe Rohner
- Ken Olin as Rocky Padillo
- Dennis Franz as Angelo Carbone
- Pat Corley as Ray Holtz
- Patrick Cassidy as Terry St. Marie
- Bernie Casey as Ozzie Peoples
- Perry Lang as John "Frenchy" Nuckles
- Larry "Flash" Jenkins as Charlie Henderson
- Mykelti Williamson as Deejay Cunningham
- Jeff McCracken as Vic Kresky
- Marco Rodríguez as Bird
- Tony Spiridakis as Lee Jacoby
- Sheree North as Lynn Holtz
- Sharon Stone as Cathy St. Marie
- Michele Greene as Judy Nuckles
- Kelly Harmon as Sunny Hayward
- Eddie Velez as Pepe Garcia

== American television ratings ==
Season	Episodes	Start date	End date	Nielsen rank	Nielsen rating
1983-84	8	October 25, 1983	July 8, 1984	92	10.0 (Note: Tied with "Two Marriages")

== Episodes ==
No.	Title	Directed by	Written by	Original release date
1	"Pilot"	Gregory Hoblit	Steven Bochco & Jeffrey Lewis	October 25, 1983
Everyone on the minor-league Bay City (California) Bluebirds dreams of baseball's big leagues; team owner Ray Holtz dreams of profits. Guest stars: Kevin McCarthy and Barry Tubb
2	"Beautiful Peoples"	Michael Rhodes	Thad Mumford & Dan Wilcox	November 1, 1983
On his own Appreciation Day, Ozzie People strikes out and later is caught stealing; meanwhile, Rohner and Jacoby are on the rebound from losing their wives. Guest stars: Leonard Stone, E. G. Daily, and Woodrow Parfrey
3	"Zircons Are Forever"	Allen Reisner	Story by : Steven Bochco & Jeffrey Lewis; Teleplay by : David Milch	November 8, 1983
Prospect St. Marie signs with a high-powered agent, spawning resentment; Rohner balks at going into business with Hayward; pitcher Mickey Wagner returns to the bluebirds. Guest stars: Barry Tubb, Rob Kim, David Sage, Shane McCabe, Robert Costanzo, Sunny Johnson, John Furey, Diane Franklin, and Denise Galik-Furey
4	"I Never Swung for My Father"	Arthur Allan Seidelman	Joel Surnow	November 15, 1983
Vic and Moe Kreskey fight; Hayward becomes even more insistent about his business proposal and more perplexed by Rohner's resistance; Padillo, Scott, and Jacoby pay a solemn final tribute to a fallen colleague. Guest stars: Barry Tubb, Ellen Blake, Rob Kim, John Karlen, John Furey, Sunny Johnson, William Lucking, and Erich Anderson
5	"Going, Going, Gone"	Rick Wallace	Steven Bochco & Jeffrey Lewis	July 1, 1984
Guest stars: Barry Tubb, Jeremy Licht, and Eddie Velez
6	"Look Homeward Hayward" "Hurry Home Hayward"	Arthur Allan Seidelman	Steven Bochco & Jeffrey Lewis	July 1, 1984
Guest stars: Barry Tubb, Jeremy Licht, and Eddie Velez
7	"Rocky IV-Eyes"	Rick Wallace	Steven Bochco & Jeffrey Lewis	July 8, 1984
Rocky tries to improve his vision, but his new glasses prove to be a distraction. Guest stars: Barry Tubb, Ellen Blake, Julius Carry, Mark Patrick Costello, Jay Gerber, Steve Greenstein, Darian Mathias, and Eddie Velez
8	"Play It Again, Milt"	Thomas Carter	Steven Bochco & Jeffrey Lewis	July 8, 1984
At season's end everyone considers their next moves; Ray commits his wife; Milt dies while playing the organ. Guest stars: Barry Tubb, E. Erick Anderson, Julius Carry, Robert Davi, Robin Gammell, Wiley Harker, Sunny Johnson, and Kevin McCarthy
