= It's Not Easy =

American TV sitcom (1983)

- Created by: Patricia Nardo
- Starring: Ken Howard; Carlene Watkins; Bert Convy; Billy Jayne; Evan Cohen; Jayne Meadows; Rachel Jacobs
- Composer: Charles Fox
- Country of origin: United States
- Original language: English
- No. of seasons: 1
- No. of episodes: 10 (6 unaired) (list of episodes)

Production
- Running time: 30 minutes
- Production companies: Patricia Nardo Productions; Konigsberg Company; 20th Century Fox Television

Original release
- Network: ABC
- Release: September 29 – October 20, 1983

It's Not Easy is an American sitcom that aired on ABC from September 29 until October 20, 1983.

== Premise ==
A divorced couple decides to live across the street from each other to make it easier for their kids.

== Cast ==
- Evan Cohen as Johnny Long
- Bert Convy as Neal Townsend
- Ken Howard as Jack Long
- Rachel Jacobs as Carol Long
- Billy Jayne as Matthew Townsend
- Jayne Meadows as Ruth Long
- Carlene Watkins as Sharon Long Townsend

== Development ==
The series was first pitched in August 1981, with ABC greenlighting it for a pilot. The original cast consisted of Gerald McRaney as Jack Long, Carlene Watkins as Sharon Long Townsend, and Larry Breeding as Neal Townsend. McRaney signed on for It's Not Easy when it appeared that his CBS detective series Simon & Simon was on the cancellation block. A test pilot was shot, and after ABC picked up the show, the project soon faced recasts.

Shortly after ABC ordered episodes for the fall of 1982, CBS announced that Simon & Simon was renewed for the 1982-83 season, rendering McRaney unavailable. The producers then sought out a replacement while ABC moved It's Not Easy off the September schedule. By late in the summer, Ken Howard was chosen to replace McRaney. Plans were moving forward to shoot a second pilot when Larry Breeding was killed in a car accident on the Hollywood Freeway on September 28, 1982, and dealing with his loss preempted the show's development for several more months. It's Not Easy finally resurfaced on ABC's development slate in the spring of 1983, with Bert Convy taking over the role of Neal Townsend, and with a fall premiere date that year.

The pilot premiered on September 29, 1983 to critical acclaim; however, the show was not finding it easy to get good ratings. The show did not last and was cancelled after only a few weeks on air. It was the first cancellation of 1983-84 season, and its Thursday night slot was replaced with Trauma Center.

== Filming ==
It's Not Easy was filmed at Radford Studio Center, at Los Angeles, California, but it is set in Lyndhurst, New Jersey.

== Episodes ==
No.	Title	Directed by	Written by	Original release date
1	"Pilot"	Robert Moore	Patricia Nardo	September 29, 1983
The kids finally meet the woman their dad has been dating.
2	"Did He or Didn't He?"	John Tracy	Anne Convy and Mitzi McCall	October 6, 1983
While visiting his ex-wife Evelyn, Neal drinks too much and spends the night after passing out on her couch, much to Sharon's dismay.
3	"Jack Kills Sharon's Grandmother"	John Tracy	Robert Sternin and Prudence Fraser	October 13, 1983
Sharon and Jack pretend that they are still married when Sharon's grandmother comes for a visit.
4	"Betrayal"	John Tracy	Gary Kott	October 20, 1983
Sharon has a personal conversation with Jack and tells Neal all about it.
5	"Teacher Pets"	Tony Singletary	Michael Cassutt	UNAIRED
Sharon has an argument with Johnny's teacher.
6	"My Dinner with Andrea"	John Tracy	Carmen Finestra	UNAIRED
7	"Taking Sides"	Tony Singletary	Robert Stevens	UNAIRED
8	"All Night Long"	Charlotte Brown	Carmen Finestra	UNAIRED
9	"Neal Kills Johnny's Fish"	Charlotte Brown	Anne Convy and Mitzi McCall	UNAIRED
10	"You Made Her Love You"	Charlotte Brown	Gary Kott	UNAIRED
