= Cutter to Houston =

1983 American television series

- Alec Baldwin, Shelley Hack, and Jim Metzler
- Genre: Medical drama
- Created by: Sandor Stern
- Written by: Rick Edelstein; Larry Mollin; Sandor Stern
- Directed by: Richard Michaels
- Starring: Shelley Hack; Jim Metzler; Alec Baldwin
- Composers: Dennis McCarthy; J.A.C. Redford
- Country of origin: United States
- Original language: English
- No. of seasons: 1
- No. of episodes: 9 (2 unaired)

Production
- Executive producer: Gerald W. Abrams
- Camera setup: Single-camera
- Running time: 45–48 minutes
- Production companies: Cypress Point Productions; MGM/UA Television

Original release
- Network: CBS
- Release: October 1 – December 31, 1983

Cutter to Houston is an American medical drama starring Shelley Hack, Jim Metzler, and Alec Baldwin that aired on CBS on Saturday night from October 1 to December 31, 1983 at 8 p.m Eastern time. The series was created by Sandor Stern.

== Synopsis ==
Cutter to Houston is set at Cutter Community Hospital in the small town of Cutter, Texas, sixty miles from Houston. The series stars Shelley Hack as surgeon Dr. Beth Gilbert, Jim Metzler as Dr. Andy Fenton, and Alec Baldwin as Dr. Hal Wexler, a GP under probation for writing illegal prescriptions.

Cutter to Houston aired on Saturdays at 8:00 PM Eastern. Due to low ratings, it was canceled after seven episodes and was replaced by Whiz Kids.

== Cast ==
- Jim Metzler as Dr. Andy Fenton
- Shelley Hack as Dr. Beth Gilbert
- Alec Baldwin as Dr. Hal Wexler
- K Callan as Connie Buford
- Noble Willingham as Mayor Warren Jarvis
- Susan Styles as Nurse Patty Alvarez

=== Notable guest appearance ===
In a 1983 episode, Chad Allen, then 9 years of age, "played a kid who got hurt and had to be given mouth-to-mouth and carried to the waiting chopper by Dr. Hal Wexler." Years later, Chad reminisced that "I thought it was the greatest job I had ever gotten," because Alec Baldwin was Dr. Wexler.

== US television ratings ==
Season	Episodes	Start date	End date	Nielsen rank	Nielsen rating	Tied with
1983-84	9 (2 Unaired)	October 8, 1983	December 31, 1983	97	8.7	N/A

== Episodes ==
No.	Title	Directed by	Written by	Original release date
1	"Pilot"	Unknown	Unknown	October 1, 1983
2	"In the Eye of the Hurricane"	Kevin Hooks	Larry Mollin	October 8, 1983
3	"From the Smallest Crystal, From the Smallest Stone"	Unknown	Unknown	October 15, 1983
4	"It Ain't Braggin' If You Done It"	Unknown	Unknown	December 10, 1983
5	"Race for Life"	Unknown	Unknown	December 17, 1983
6	"Tell Me a Riddle, Daddy"	Unknown	Unknown	December 24, 1983
7	"The Life You Save"	Unknown	Unknown	December 31, 1983
8	"Don't Look for Zebras"	TBD	TBD	UNAIRED
9	"The Very Best of Friends"	TBD	TBD	UNAIRED
