= Life's Most Embarrassing Moments =

- Title screen of first special
- Directed by: Woody Fraser (first special); Jerry Kupcinet (subsequent specials)
- Presented by: John Ritter (first special); Steve Allen (subsequent specials)
- Narrated by: Johnny Olson (1983-85)
- Country of origin: United States
- Original language: English

Production
- Producers: Alan Landsburg, Woody Fraser
- Production company: Alan Landsburg Productions

Original release
- Network: ABC
- Release: 1983 – 1986

Life's Most Embarrassing Moments is a series of television comedy specials primarily featuring "blooper" outtakes, and appeared on the ABC network in the United States from 1983 to 1986.

Created by Alan Landsburg Productions the first special aired on April 27, 1983, hosted by John Ritter, and was the most-watched prime time television show of the week. Steve Allen hosted approximately nine subsequent installments, which started in September 1983, with the last special airing in May 1986. The content of the show was primarily outtakes of celebrity mishaps. A number of the specials were also rerun as a "weekly series" in August to early September 1985. Each installment was numbered, e.g., Life's Most Embarrassing Moments III.

The first special was highly watched, but reviewer Tom Shales at The Washington Post was not impressed. Noting the show was plainly a response to NBC's Bloopers specials, Shales called it a "grossly irritating hour" where after every clip "the director cut to the studio audience for a hefty round of artificially augmented applause." The comparison to Bloopers was noted by many, and that show's creator Dick Clark Productions sued Alan Landsburg Productions over it in federal court. The case was eventually dismissed, and the dismissal was affirmed on appeal. The trial court concluded that copyright protections do not protect the format of a show: "The format of the two shows look similar, but so do the formats of virtually every television news show. The 'look' of a show is not the proper subject of copyright protection."

In 1988-89, a syndicated version of the show was created with Roy Firestone as the host.

== Episodes ==
1. April 27, 1983 (hosted by John Ritter) (Most viewed prime time show of the week per Nielsen ratings, with 28.0 rating and 44 share)
2. September 18, 1983 (hosted by Steve Allen, as were all subsequent specials)(21.7 Nielsen rating, or 18.1 million homes, tied for 2nd place for week)
3. November 10, 1983 (Nielsen rating 19.8, 16.5 million homes, #16 for week)
4. February 23, 1984
5. May 1984 (rerun?) (#3 rated show of the week)
6. November 11, 1984
7. February 17, 1985
8. May 5, 1985
9. August ?, 1985
10. February 1, 1986 (lowest Nielsen rating of week, 6.9 rating, 68 out of 68 shows)
11. May 24, 1986
