= Nathan Cook (actor) =

American actor (1950–1988)

- Born: Nathan Earl Cook; April 9, 1950; Philadelphia, Pennsylvania, U.S.
- Died: June 11, 1988 (aged 38); Santa Monica, California, U.S.
- Occupation: Actor
- Years active: 1974–1988
- Spouse: Cara Cook (1984–1988; his death)
- Children: 2

Nathan Earl Cook (April 9, 1950 – June 11, 1988) was an American actor.

== Early life ==
Cook was born in Philadelphia, Pennsylvania. After graduation from Penn State University, he was hired as a member of the repertory company at Actors Theatre of Louisville in Kentucky.

== Career ==
After moving to Los Angeles in 1975, Cook was popularly known for roles on two television series: playing Milton Reese, a high school basketball player on The White Shadow (1978–1980), and portraying security head Billy Griffin on Hotel (1983–1988). Between these two, he had a shorter role (1981–1982) as Detective Virgil Brooks in Hill Street Blues.

Cook made frequent appearances as a celebrity guest on the game shows Body Language, Super Password, and the $25,000 and $100,000 Pyramids. He helped a contestant win a $100,000 Pyramid Tournament of Champions in 1988.

He also appeared as a celebrity in the 1987 game show pilot for Money in the Blank.

== Personal life ==
Cook was involved for a time with actress Alfre Woodard before marrying his wife, Cara. Together they had two children, son Cameron Edward Cook (born September 17, 1984) and a second child, born in 1986.

Cook was an accomplished jazz flute player.

His eldest brother, Edward Cook (born December 22, 1947, died 1995) was a ballet dancer and choreographer in Europe.

== Death ==
Cook was admitted to Santa Monica Hospital on June 11, 1988, where he was taken after complaining he was having trouble breathing. He died an hour later. Initial reports said he died from a severe allergic reaction to penicillin but a later report said that the cause of death was natural causes from acute laryngo epiglottis (infection of the voice box) that subsequently triggered cardiac arrest. There were no drugs in his system and he had reportedly had a strep throat the previous week. His final TV appearance on the $100,000 Pyramid had yet to air in some markets at the time of his death but Bob Stewart Productions decided not to pull the episodes.

His body is interred at Forest Lawn Memorial Park in Hollywood Hills.

== Filmography ==
Year	Title	Role	Notes
1974	Abby	Tafa Hassan	
1979	The Last Word	Officer Caine	
1983	National Lampoon's Vacation	Man Giving Directions	

=== Television ===
Year	Title	Role	Notes
1976	Guns	Colt .45	
1978	Katie: Portrait of a Centerfold	Postman	
1978-1981	The White Shadow	Milton Reese	40 episodes
1980	3-2-1 Contact	Himself	5 episodes
1980	Scared Straight! Another Story	Doctor	
1981	Hill Street Blues	Virgil Brooks	3 episodes
1982	The Ambush Murders	Gordon Steele	TV Movie
1982	The Astronauts	Scotty	TV Movie
1983	The New Odd Couple		1 episode
1984	American Playhouse		1 episode
1985	The Love Boat	Carl Tysdell	1 episode
1983-1988	Hotel	Billy Griffin	115 episodes
