= Identity Festival =

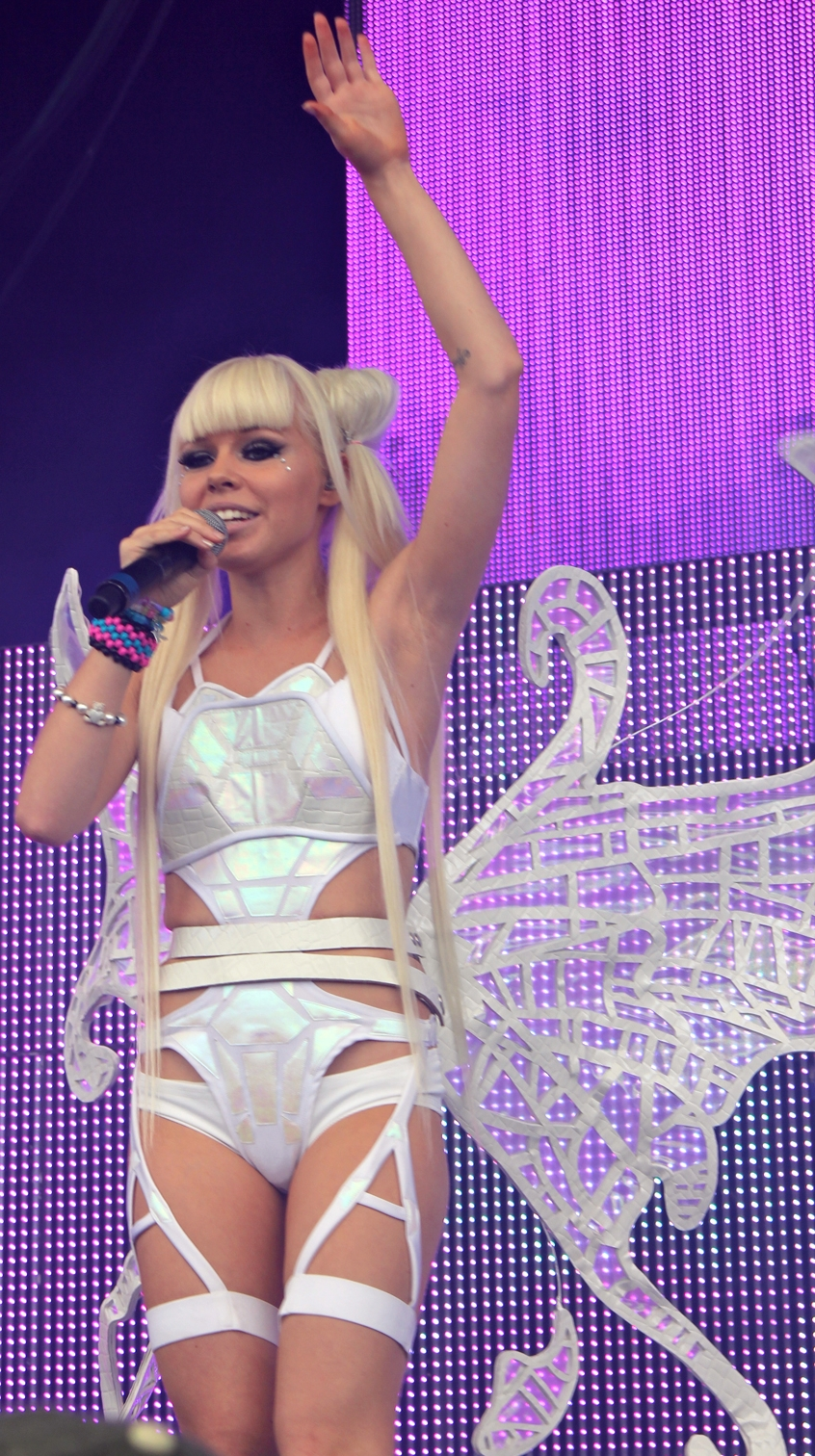
- Kerli performing at Identity Festival in 2012
- Genre: Electronic-music festival
- Frequency: Annually
- Location: Touring various cities in North America
- Years active: Two
- Inaugurated: 2011; 15 years ago
- Most recent: August 19, 2012, (in Phoenix, Arizona, Arizona, United States)
- Website: idfestival.com

The Identity Festival was an American annual music festival that featured popular electronic music artists. The festival toured various North American cities.

== Conception ==
The talent agency William Morris Endeavor recognized the demand for electronic music and organized the festival and tour that promised fans of the genre a "full electronic music experience".

== 2011 ==
=== Artist lineup ===
- Aeroplane
- Afrobeta
- Avicii
- Booka Shade
- Chuckie
- Datsik
- Disco Biscuits
- DJ Shadow
- Doorly
- The Eye
- Holy Ghost!
- Jessie and The Toy Boys
- Kaskade
- L.A. Riots
- Modeselektor
- N.E.R.D.
- Nero
- Nervo
- Pete Tong
- Pretty Lights
- Rusko
- Skrillex
- Steve Aoki
- The Crystal Method
- White Shadow

=== Tour dates and venues ===
- August 11: Indianapolis, IN @Verizon Wireless Amphitheater
- August 12: Detroit, MI @ DTE Energy Music Theatre
- August 13: Pittsburgh, PA @ First Niagara Pavilion
- August 14: Holmdel, NJ @ PNC Bank Arts Center
- August 16: Charlotte, NC Verizon Wireless Amphitheatre
- August 18: Bristow, VA @ Jiffy Lube Live
- August 19: Camden, NJ @ Susquehanna Bank Center
- August 20: Boston, MA @ Comcast Center
- August 21: Wantagh, NY @ Jones Beach Amphitheatre
- August 23: Atlanta, GA @ Lakewood Amphitheatre
- August 24: Tampa, FL @ 1-800-ASK-GARY Amphitheatre
- August 25: Miami, FL @ Klipsch Amphitheatre @ Bayfront Park (canceled)
- August 27: Houston, TX @ Cynthia Woods Mitchell Pavilion
- August 28: Dallas, TX @ Gexa Energy Pavilion
- August 30: Albuquerque, NM @ Hard Rock Casino Presents: The Pavilion
- September 2: San Diego, CA @ Cricket Wireless Amphitheatre
- September 3: San Francisco, CA @ Shoreline Amphitheatre
- September 4: Los Angeles, CA @ San Manuel Amphitheater – San Bernardino, CA
- September 5: Las Vegas, NV TBD
- September 10: Seattle, WA @ The Gorge

== 2012 ==
=== Artist lineup ===
- Adrian Lux
- Arty
- Audrey Napoleon
- Bingo Players
- Cole Plante
- Datsik
- D3FF & AKTEC
- Doctor P
- DVBBS
- Eric Prydz
- Eva Simons
- Excision
- The Eye
- The Gaslamp Killer
- Hardwell
- Jdevil
- Kerli
- Le Castle Vania
- Madeon
- Mighty Fools
- Nero
- Noisia
- Paul Van Dyk
- Porter Robinson
- Showtek
- Static Revenger
- Stephan Jacobs
- Wolfgang Gartner

=== Tour dates and venues ===
- July 19: Cincinnati, OH @ Riverbend Music Center
- July 20: Detroit, MI @ Elektricity Festival Grounds
- July 21: Toronto, Canada @ Echo Beach powered by Rogers
- July 26: Mansfield, MA @ Comcast Center
- July 27: Bristow, VA @ Jiffy Lube Live
- July 28: Wantagh, NY @ Nikon at Jones Beach Theater
- July 29: Philadelphia, PA @ Festival Pier at Penn's Landing
- August 2: Atlanta, GA @ Aarons Amphitheatre
- August 3: Tampa, FL @ 1-800 Ask Gary Amphitheatre
- August 4: Miami @ Klipsch Amphitheatre at Bayfront
- August 10: Dallas @ Gexa Energy Pavilion
- August 11: Houston @ Cynthia Woods Mitchell Pavilion
- August 17: San Francisco @ Shoreline Amphitheatre
- August 18: San Diego @ Cricket Amphitheatre
- August 19: Phoenix @ Pavilion Amphitheatre

== See also ==
- List of electronic music festivals
- Music of the United States
