= Glen Helen Amphitheater =

Amphitheater in San Bernardino, California, US

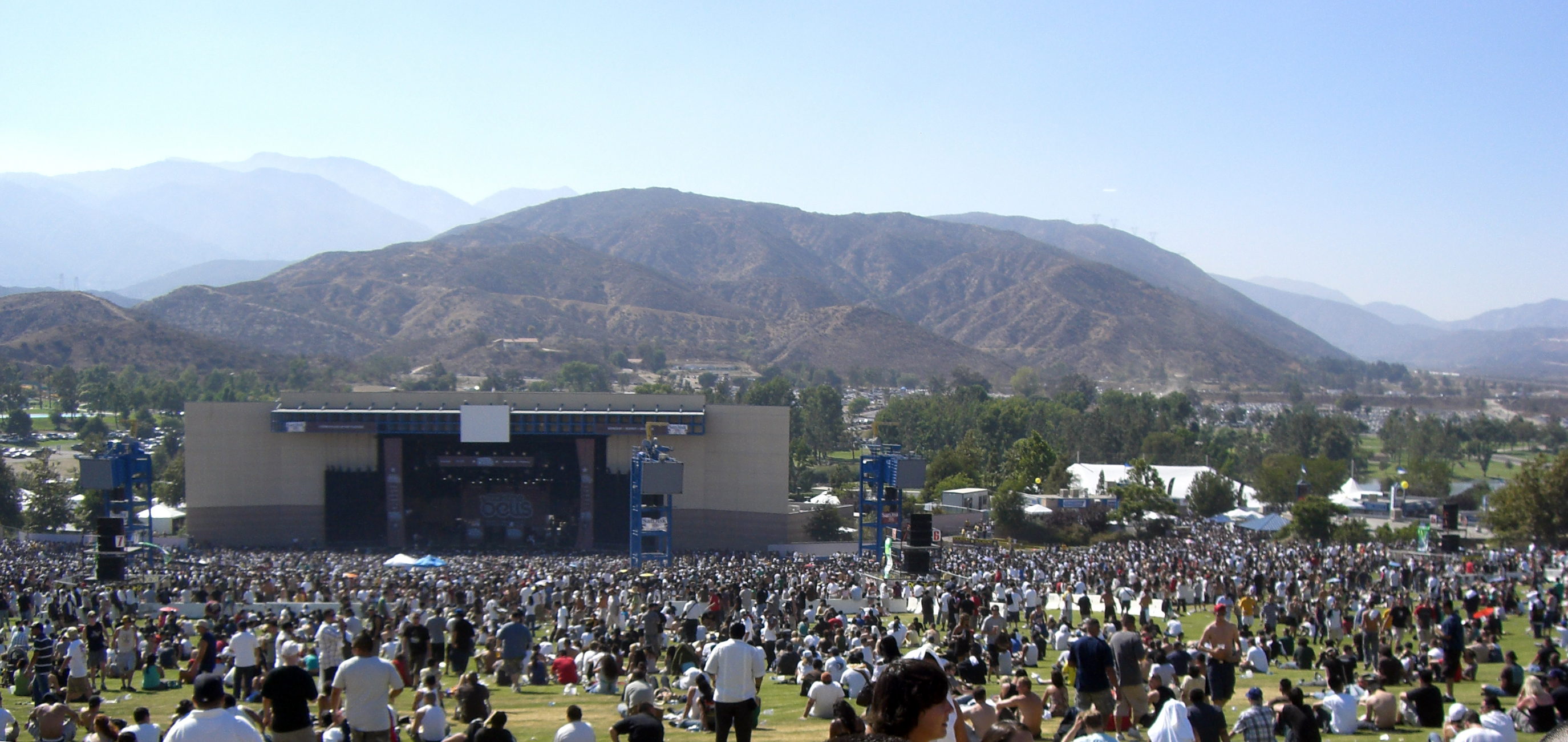
- Interactive map of Glen Helen Amphitheater
- Former names: Blockbuster Pavilion (1993–2003); Hyundai Pavilion (2003–08); San Manuel Amphitheater (2008-17)
- Address: 2575 Glen Helen Parkway, San Bernardino, California
- Location: San Bernardino, California, United States
- Coordinates: 34.2043°N 117.4022°W
- Owner: San Bernardino County
- Capacity: 65,000
- Type: Amphitheatre

Construction
- Opened: 1993

Website
- livenation.com

The Glen Helen Amphitheater (originally Blockbuster Pavilion and formerly Hyundai Pavilion and San Manuel Amphitheater) is a 65,000-capacity amphitheater located in the hills of Glen Helen Regional Park in San Bernardino, California, United States.

It is the largest outdoor music venue in the United States. The orchestra, box, and loge sections seat a combined 10,902 people, and the lawn section seats 54,098. It opened in 1993.

It was originally built for the US Festival, and again for US Festival 2 and originally held 300,000 people "grass only".

The amphitheater's concert season begins in March and ends in November, for the winter season.

The amphitheater has played host to many music festivals, including Anger Management Tour, Area Festival, Battle of San Bernardino Festival, Crüe Fest, Crüe Fest 2, Family Values Tour, Gigantour, H.O.R.D.E. Festival, Identity Festival, It's Not Dead Festival, Knotfest, KROQ's LA Invasion Festival, Mayhem Festival, Ozzfest, Projekt Revolution, Rock & Roll Blowout Festival, Rock the Bells Festival and Smokeout Music Festival.

Tina Turner performed during her What's Love? Tour on September 15, 1993, the show was recorded and was broadcast on Fox, entitled What's Love...? Live.

On July 11, 2008, the San Manuel Casino announced that it had acquired a long-term agreement to the naming rights of the amphitheater, which was thereafter known as the San Manuel Amphitheater.

In January 2017, the San Manuel Indian Casino's naming rights contract expired, and the venue is now named the Glen Helen Amphitheater.

Beginning in 2019, Garth Brooks had a three-year contract to perform an annual concert at the Glen Helen Amphitheater as part of his Stadium Tour. The last of his three concerts at Glen Helen was in 2021.

== See also ==
- List of contemporary amphitheaters
