= Teachers Only =

American TV series (1982–1983)

- Season 2 cast
- Genre: Sitcom
- Created by: Aaron Ruben
- Starring: Lynn Redgrave; Norman Fell; Adam Arkin; Van Nessa Clarke; Norman Bartold; Richard Karron; Kit McDonough; Teresa Ganzel; Tim Reid; Steve Ryan; Jean Smart; Joel Brooks
- Theme music composer: William King; Ronald LaPread; Thomas McClary; Walter Orange; Milan Williams
- Opening theme: "Reach High" (The Commodores) - Season 2
- Country of origin: United States
- Original language: English
- No. of seasons: 2
- No. of episodes: 21

Production
- Executive producer: Aaron Ruben
- Producers: Larry Rosen; Larry Tucker; George Yanok
- Running time: 30 minutes
- Production company: Carson Productions

Original release
- Network: NBC
- Release: April 14, 1982 – May 14, 1983

Teachers Only is an American sitcom on NBC that centered on the faculty of a Los Angeles high school who spent a lot of time in the teacher's lounge, where the students were not allowed. Following a short first season, the show was completely overhauled, with only stars Lynn Redgrave and Norman Fell returning.

== Production ==
Lynn Redgrave had starred on CBS's House Calls for two seasons, but she was replaced by Sharon Gless in the third. It was heavily reported that she was fired for breastfeeding her newborn at work, but the network claimed it was a budget dispute (Redgrave's then-husband/manager later asserted both parts were true). Eager to cash in on the publicity and cater to her every need, third-place network NBC quickly offered her this series. In a similar situation, Norman Fell had shot to fame overnight as the crotchety landlord on ABC's Three's Company, but he found himself at odds with the network after being exiled to the short-lived spinoff, The Ropers. Cast as the young science teacher was Adam Arkin, then best-known as the son of Alan Arkin. The rest of the cast was populated by little-known character actors. Series creator Aaron Ruben brought along writing veterans from his most recent endeavor, The Stockard Channing Show (which suffered a notably similar fate, being a revamped version of Channing's previous sitcom, Just Friends).

When it returned in early 1983, Redgrave and Fell retained their character names, but everything else had changed. Redgrave switched occupations from English teacher to guidance counselor, all hints of an eventual romance between her and Fell were nixed, and his character is revealed to have been carrying on in a longtime secret affair with his secretary, portrayed by Jean Smart. This was Smart's first television experience, and although her agent remarked, "You really don’t know your ass from apple butter, do you?," she was given the plumpest role of the new ensemble.

Tim Reid simultaneously replaced Arkin's science teacher (also named Michael) and Van Nessa Clark's token black character. Teresa Ganzel was a regular in skits on The Tonight Show Starring Johnny Carson, and his company produced this series, which led to her involvement. Ganzel was at a moment of particular success, having recently been showcased as the object of male desire in the 1982 film The Toy, which was cited in NBC advertisements. Originally, Joel Brooks costarred as the music teacher, but his character was dropped after eight episodes and he was scrubbed from the opening credits. However, the network did not broadcast the episodes in production order, so he appeared all throughout the season. Although they still explored dark themes such as violence against women and racial profiling, the new writing staff generally kept a lighter tone.

The Commodores' song "Reach High," which appeared on the band's compilation album "All the Great Hits", was touted as the show's second season theme song, and the band was prominently listed in the closing credits as an instrumental version played. This cross-promotional media gimmick proved to be fruitless, as the show flopped and the single failed to make it onto the music charts.

== Series overview ==
The first season is set at Millard Fillmore High, and includes the principal, vice-principal, secretary, janitor, English, French, and science teachers. The second season is set at Woodrow Wilson High, and includes the principal, secretary, guidance counselor, coach, science, English, music, and history teachers.

| Season | Episodes | First aired | Last aired |
|---|---|---|---|
| 1 | 8 | April 14, 1982 | June 9, 1982 |
| 2 | 13 | February 12, 1983 | May 14, 1983 |

== Cast and characters ==
=== Season 1 ===
- Lynn Redgrave as Diana Swanson - The British English teacher exudes an air of dignified sophistication without condescension. Diana is a warm people-person who takes a hands-on approach, not only with her pupils but in all of her endeavors. She's divorced and teaching hasn't left much time for a love life, although she has the occasional date.
- Norman Fell as Ben Cooper The principal is good with numbers, having worked his way up from being a math teacher. Mr. Cooper prefers to keep the faculty at arm's length to make it less difficult in the instances when he has to act as a superior. At home, he has a nagging wife to contend with, and there are indications that he's attracted to Diana (who outright admits her attraction to him to the other teachers).
- Adam Arkin as Michael Dreyfuss - A 5-year veteran at Millard Fillmore, the young science teacher is a dorky, big-hearted bachelor who's close with Diana, although there are no indications of romantic feelings between them. Mr. Dreyfuss is quick-witted, passionate about science, and loves to see his students' faces light up when they learn something new.
- Van Nessa Clarke as Gwen Edwards - The French teacher is a sassy Black lady who thrives by spouting off quips en Francaise. Virtually nothing is revealed about her as a person over the course of the season.
- Norman Bartold as Mr. Brody - Vice-Principal and unrepentant suck-up Brody the Toadie has held his position since the early 1960s. A believer in traditional values, the petty, pompous, and persnickety Mr. Brody still lives with his mother and is married to his job. One of his few responsibilities is creating staff questionnaires—and he's prolific at it, which aggravates the entire faculty.
- Richard Karron as Mr. Pafko - The janitor is an oddball who does as little work as possible, and he lurks in the background, ready to interject something bizarre or profound into a conversation.
- Kit McDonough as Lois - The school secretary is a busybody with her finger on the pulse of the latest gossip. In her personal life, she's constantly on the hunt for Mr. Right.

=== Season 2 ===
- Lynn Redgrave as Diana Swanson - The guidance counselor immigrated from Britain to the United States in the early 1960s and married a debonaire grifter, although she eventually built up the courage to leave him, and later coerced a confession from him for the police. Her best friend is Sam, and she gradually becomes frenemies with Shari, whose secret she keeps. Diana loves her students and fights for their well-being.
- Norman Fell as Ben Cooper - A World War II veteran, the Principal has been hardened by life and the death of his wife. He and his secretary, Shari, have been having an affair for years, but he's opted to keep his love hidden for fear that it will ruin their business reputations. Mr. Cooper is quite adept at juggling his responsibilities at the office, but he often comes across as gruff, and his decisions aren't always popular.
- Jean Smart as Shari, - The principal's secretary and longtime mistress is the resident antagonist, who's shamelessly condescending and bitchy toward everyone. However, she genuinely loves Mr. Cooper and softens toward Diana, who is her occasional-confidant.
- Tim Reid as Michael Horne - The science teacher is proclaimed to be the most beloved teacher by the entire student body. Michael is down-to-earth, loves technology, and shows compassion for everyone he meets.
- Steve Ryan as Spud Le Boone - The boys gym coach is dimwitted but amiable. Michael is his best friend, and he's been married to his wife Scooter for over a decade.
- Teresa Ganzel as Samantha Keating - The English teacher is also Diana's next-door-neighbor and best friend. Sam is sweet but shallow, and obsessed with material possessions.
- Joel Brooks as Barney Betelman - The music teacher is a lovelorn sadsack tech geek who's so concerned for his own safety that he's turned his apartment into a booby-trapped fortress.

==== Recurring ====
- Steffen Zacharias as Mr. Cochrane - The history teacher appears whenever a doddering old man is required for a brief moment of comic relief.
- Brian Robbins as Vinnie Minetti - A playful, rebellious young student who passionately professes his love for Diana.
- Larry B. Scott as Gene - A wisecracking student who's a member of the shop class and a victim of racial profiling.

== Episodes ==
=== Season 1 (1982) ===
| No. overall | No. in season | Title | Directed by | Written by | Original release date |
|---|---|---|---|---|---|
| 1 | 1 | "Diana, Substitute Mother" | Peter Baldwin | Aaron Ruben & Mike Weinberger | April 14, 1982 |
Diana comes to the realization that her star student is troubled, but the situation escalates when the girl becomes a runaway. Also, Diana gives into a flirtation with her neighbor and agrees to a date. Guest Stars: Mark Metcalf (David Lewis), Cindy Fisher (Ginger Peterson), Sally Kemp (Mrs. Peterson)
| 2 | 2 | "The Dreyfuss Affair" | Peter Baldwin | Story: Gene Marcione; Teleplay: George Yanok | April 21, 1982 |
In a malicious attempt to get a passing grade, Victoria entraps Michael and accuses him of being sexual predator. Michael refuses to defend himself, so Diana gets to the bottom of things. Also, Mr. Brody pushes for a school dress code. Guest Stars: Heidi Bohay (Victoria), Leslie King (Debbie)
| 3 | 3 | "Cooper's Grab for Gusto" | Peter Baldwin | Aaron Ruben | April 28, 1982 |
Following the death of a friend, Mr. Cooper worries about his own mortality. Also, Mr. Cooper tells Mr. Brody that he can have more responsibility, so Brody gets right to work implementing changes at school. Note: The passersby is the one-way hallway circle throughout the entire scene. Guest Star: Bill Zuckert (Doctor)
| 4 | 4 | "Quote, Unquote" | Peter Baldwin | George Yanok | May 5, 1982 |
The parent–teacher association accuses her of undermining the moral fiber of their children, and the media descends when the school's young literary journalists twist Diana's words to make it seem that she condones premarital sex. Guest Stars: Amanda Wyss (Amy Kelly), Timothy Patrick Murphy (Jeremy Stewart), Mary Betten (Mrs. Corrigan), Fredric Cook (Edgar Wheelwright), Layla Bias Galloway (Margaret Burnside), Rosanna Huffman (Evelyn Helmsley)
| 5 | 5 | "The Make Up Test" | Peter Baldwin | Aaron Ruben | May 12, 1982 |
Diana refuses to give a makeup test to Jeff, an unrepentant slacker, so his rich father goes over her head. This infuriates Diana and leads Jeff to confess self-sabotage to his dad. Meanwhile, Michael's classroom is looted. Note: This was the first episode shot. Guest Stars: Michael J. Fox (Jeff Clayton), Dana Elcar (Mr. Clayton), Howard Platt (Coach Bowers)
| 6 | 6 | "I've Got a Crush on You" | Peter Baldwin | Mike Weinberger | May 26, 1982 |
Greg, the star football quarterback, falls for Diana during their tutoring sessions, and jealousy puts his future in jeopardy when Michael tries to intervene. Guest Star: Michael Spound (Greg Hughes)
| 7 | 7 | "The Once and Future Teacher" | Peter Baldwin | George Yanok | June 2, 1982 |
Bogged down with paperwork and meetings, the retirement of an elder coworker prompts Diana to toy with the notion of leaving the teaching profession. Note: Miss Pritchard receives a replica of Rodin's famous statue The Thinker which is posed differently. Guest Stars: Bibi Osterwald (Miss Pritchard), Arthur Rosenberg (Mr. Fletcher)
| 8 | 8 | "Guns and Butter" | Peter Baldwin | George Yanok | June 9, 1982 |
The school board is looking to make budget cuts, so they send in a humorless man who replaces Mr. Brody with a computer. Guest Star: George Wyner (Hunter Hogan)

=== Season 2 (1983) ===
| No. overall | No. in season | Title | Directed by | Written by | Original release date |
|---|---|---|---|---|---|
| 9 | 1 | "The Rose" | Charles S. Dubin | Larry Rosen, & Larry Tucker | February 12, 1983 |
After Diana rejects the advances of David, she's overwhelmed by jealousy when he sends Sam a single red rose to ask her out. Also, Michael experiments with pheromones and electricity. Guest Stars: Alan Feinstein (David), Renae Jacobs (Teacher), Craig Littler (Handsome Man), Steffen Zacharias (Mr. Cochran)
| 10 | 2 | "Cooper's Arrangement" | Charles S. Dubin | April Kelly | February 19, 1983 |
Diana conspires with the rest of the faculty to find Mr. Cooper a date, but she discovers he's secretly in a relationship with Shari. Meanwhile, after delegating responsibility to the teachers to paint over graffiti, Shari becomes jealous when Michael is featured on TV.
| 11 | 3 | "Take This Job and Shove It" | John Bowab | April Kelly | February 26, 1983 |
Shari is miffed when Diana and Principal Cooper swap jobs. Also, Michael tries to figure out how to deal with a child who's being abused, and delinquent student Ponch steals everything that's not nailed down. Guest Star: Roberto Roman (Ponch Melendez)
| 12 | 4 | "Praise the Lord and Pasta Ammunition" | Rod Daniel | April Kelly | March 5, 1983 |
Vinnie leads a student revolt which finds the cafeteria barricaded, and Diana locked in the kitchen with a quarreling Shari and Principal Cooper. On the other side of the door, Michael and Sam fight for control as teachers are instructed to carry on with business as usual. Note: Joel Brooks does not appear in this episode. Guest Stars: Brian Robbins (Vinnie Minetti), Donna Wilkes (Julie), Mike Darnell (Pauly)
| 13 | 5 | "Rex, the Wonder Husband" | John Bowab | Larry Rosen, & Larry Tucker | March 12, 1983 |
Diana's conman ex-husband rents out her apartment to Principal Cooper's brother-in-law. Also, Vinnie tests reactions to new school mascots by bringing in exotic animals. Note: Joel Brooks does not appear in this episode. Guest Stars: John Bennett Perry (Rex Swanson), John C. Becher (Arnie Ligner), Brian Robbins (Vinnie Minetti), Jennifer Richards (Arnie's Girlfriend), Greg Finley (Police Officer)
| 14 | 6 | "Teacher's Pet" | Tony Singletary | Story: Wally Dalton; Teleplay: Ann Martin | March 19, 1983 |
Michael has overwhelming chemistry with a new student, but the situation worsens after Diana learns she's an undercover narcotics agent. Also, Sam sells junky designer jewelry to earn money for a pair of alligator boots. Guest Stars: Fay Hauser (Beth Perry), Larry B. Scott (Gene)
| 15 | 7 | "Take the Money and Run" | Alan Bergman | Larry Spencer | April 2, 1983 |
Mr. Batterman wins the $150,000 state lottery and promptly drops dead, leaving Diana in a moral dilemma over what to do with the ticket. Also, Diana realizes Liz is responsible for a rash of school thefts. Note: Joel Brooks does not appear in this episode. Guest Stars: Arthur Peterson Jr. (Pernell Batterman), Karin Argoud (Liz Pallamino), Penina Segall (Julie), Clark Mitchell Long (Leroy Batterman)
| 16 | 8 | "Otherwise Engaged" | Rod Daniel | Ann L. Gibbs & Joel Kimmel | April 9, 1983 |
After Diana meddles in her relationship with the principal, Shari flaunts her sudden engagement to a handsome, wealthy, young man. Meanwhile, Sam diets in hopes of fitting into a bikini that she's had her eye on. Note: Joel Brooks does not appear in this episode. Guest Stars: Michael Lemon (Chad Devereaux III), Steffen Zacharias (Mr. Cochrane)
| 17 | 9 | "Beetlemania" | Mel Ferber | April Kelly | April 16, 1983 |
After the state funding committee cancels the auto shop and nursing classes, Diana goads the students to disassemble Mr. Cooper's car and reassemble it in the teacher's lounge. Unfortunately, they refuse to reverse the process. Also, Mrs. Darnell eagerly waits for her pregnancy to be over. Guest Stars: Nicolas Coster (Mr. Finch), Edie McClurg (Mrs. Darnell), Larry B. Scott (James), Israel Juarbe (Shop Student)
| 18 | 10 | "Leather and Lace" | Linda Day | April Kelly Diana Kirgo, Julie Kirgo | April 23, 1983 |
Diana has a whirlwind romance with a substitute, but the relationship sours when she learns he's the substitute janitor. Guest Star: David Ackroyd (Jack Murphy)
| 19 | 11 | "It's My Party and I'll Cry If I Want To" | Rod Daniel | Tom Chehak | April 30, 1983 |
Diana hosts a party for her coworkers under false pretenses, hiding the fact that the mayor is to present them an award. To get even with Mr. Cooper for his critique of her outfit, Shari convinces him that it's a costume party; a bloated version of Michael's high school crush comes to town; Spud and Scooter have their first fight on their 11th anniversary; and Sam finds love in the elevator when she's trapped with the school board man. Note: Joel Brooks does not appear in this episode. Guest Stars: James O'Sullivan (Jim Klein), Jo Marie Payton (Yolanda), Joel Kimmel (Jeffrey)
| 20 | 12 | "Dead Mice Don't Wear Plaid" | Tony Singletary | Larry Spencer | May 7, 1983 |
The school mouse dies while in Diana's care, so Sam replaces it, unaware that Michael was monitoring the rodent's illness. Also, a grouchy repairman works on the school's heater. Guest Star: Bill Saluga (Repairman)
| 21 | 13 | "Loss of Innocence" | Linda Day | April Kelly | May 14, 1983 |
In a very special episode, Sam devolves into a shell of herself after being mugged. Guest Stars: Jesse Aragon (Student), Steffen Zacharias (Mr. Cochran)

== Broadcast history ==
Teachers Only had a two-month tryout on Wednesday nights in April and June 1982, replacing the Tony Randall vehicle Love, Sidney. It was rerun on Thursday nights in September, just prior to the start of the new TV season. The second season of Love, Sidney was relegated to Saturday nights, where it struggled through December and was replaced by Taxi, which also failed to draw an audience during a brief stint before Teachers Only took over the low-rated time slot. Second season ratings plummeted, and Teachers Only vanished from NBC after the final episode was broadcast.

The complete series was made available for streaming on the CTV Television Network's "Throwback" section in January 2021.

| Season | Time | Dates |
|---|---|---|
| 1981–82 | Wednesday at 9:30 pm Thursday at 9:30pm | April–June 1982; September 1982 |
| 1982–83 | Saturday at 9:30 pm | February–May 1983 |

== U.S. television ratings ==
| Season | Episodes | Start date | End date | Nielsen rank | Nielsen rating |
|---|---|---|---|---|---|
| 1981-82 | 8 | April 14, 1982 | June 9, 1982 | 46 | N/A |
| 1982-83 | 13 | February 12, 1983 | May 14, 1983 | 93 | N/A |
