= White Shadow =

White Shadow or The White Shadow may refer to:

== Film and TV ==
- The White Shadow (film), a 1923 British film
- The White Shadow (TV series), a 1970s American television series about a school basketball team
- White Shadow (film), a 2013 Tanzanian film

== Music ==
- White Shadow (band), an American alternative rock band that formed in 2006
- DJ White Shadow, an American music producer

=== Songs ===
- "White Shadow", a song from Peter Gabriel's Peter Gabriel (1978 album)

== Other uses ==
- White Shadow, character from the animated film Turbo (film)
- White Shadow, character from the animated series Minoriteam
- The White Shadow, a short story by Robert W. Chambers in his collection The Mystery of Choice
