= GSN Live =

American live television series

- Presented by: Bob Guiney
- Country of origin: United States
- Original language: English

Production
- Running time: 3–5 minutes (per segment); 3 hours (February 25, 2008 - September 12, 2008, October 12, 2009 - July 29, 2011); 6 hours (September 15, 2008 - October 9, 2009)

Original release
- Network: GSN
- Release: February 25, 2008 – July 29, 2011

GSN Live is an American live interactive show on Game Show Network that premiered on February 25, 2008, at noon ET and officially ended its 3-year run on July 29, 2011. The last "live" edition aired May 13, 2011. It lasted three hours in between regular GSN programming and featured games that viewers played to win prizes over the phone, highlights from Classic game shows, interviews, behind-the-scenes views of GSN, and celebrity appearances. It was formerly hosted in two shifts. The first shift, from Noon to 3:00 p.m. ET was hosted by Heidi Bohay (with Alfonso Ribeiro until August 11, 2009). Fred Roggin hosted the 3:00 p.m. to 6:00 p.m. ET segment. Kelly Packard co-hosted from September 15 to November 28, 2008, and Roggin co-hosted the 3 hours with rotating guest hosts until Debra Skelton was chosen to replace Packard on May 26, 2009, the same day the current set was introduced and when it was hosted by three people. Fred Roggin left GSN Live on July 2, 2009, Alfonso Ribeiro left GSN Live on August 11, 2009, Debra Skelton left GSN Live in January 2010, and Heidi Bohay left the show in April 2010, making Bob Guiney currently the sole host. The show was executive produced by Burt Dubrow until March 6, 2009, and is currently produced by John Berkson, Gary Green, and Laura Slobin. The sound mixer was Mike Dooley. Budget cuts implemented by the new GSN executive regime are causing the almost weekly dismissals of production staff members from the show. Due to these cuts the show was cut from six hours to three hours and now runs from 3:00 p.m. to 6:00 p.m. ET. The staff was cut by 7 effective December 30, 2009, leaving the future of the show in question.

The show has run for three hours daily, Noon to 3:00 p.m. ET from its debut until September 12, 2008, and since October 12, 2009, from 3:00 p.m. to 6:00 p.m. ET. The hosts for the three-hour show were Fred Roggin and Heidi Bohay. On September 15, 2008, it expanded to six hours daily and ran from Noon to 6:00 p.m. ET until October 9, 2009. GSN Live was on hiatus for the week of May 18, 2009, to May 25, 2009, to transition to a new set, and returned on May 26, 2009.

== Format ==
The interactive games on GSN Live are interspersed during regular programming for a short time when commercials would normally run. Games are introduced at the beginning of an hour and played by a caller near the end of the hour. There is only one player for each game. Entries can be made on the internet or over the phone, both having an equal chance of selection.

Every individual who logs on or calls to enter, whether they are chosen to play on the air live or not, is entered into a "Weekly Prize Bonanza" drawing for which a single prize is awarded once a week. Prizes in the first three weeks included a vacation package, diamond watches, and a cruise. (Currently, the prize is awarded monthly.) In addition, all contestants who play on-air are currently awarded 2,500 "Oodles," (5,000 on "Winner Wednesday" shows) an online currency offered to GSN website users.

At the beginning of March, the show introduced another way home viewers can win called "Steal These Wheels". All contestants chosen to play live on the air were entered into a drawing for a new Chrysler PT Cruiser, which was awarded on the first day of April. Generally, during the final segment of the show, the hosts presented three keys with labels showing the first names and towns of that day's players, then placed them into a glass tumbler, referred to as a "hopper". The hosts had a running gag that the car was parked in host Fred Roggin's parking spot, thus making the spot unavailable for his own car.

GSN Live logo from February 2008 – May 2009

On April 1, 2008, a name was pulled from the hopper, and the PT Cruiser was awarded to a male contestant living in Woodstock, Illinois. Host Heidi Bohay then surprised viewers by announcing that "Steal These Wheels" would continue for a second month, with a Jeep Patriot being the prize.

During the final week of March, regular host Fred Roggin took a one-week vacation. In his absence, game show legend and celebrity emcee Wink Martindale took his place. Regularly, throughout the week, Martindale made jokes centering on Roggin's absence, such as finding a wallet full of cash tucked inside the host chair and revealing to the audience that Fred was not on vacation, but was, in fact, on the run from the police. While Fred was in Beijing, China for NBC's Olympic coverage, several hosts filled in, including Martindale, Alfonso Ribeiro, Ty Treadway and Bob Goen.

The hosts have increasingly taken a light-hearted approach to the show's material, gently poking fun at the classic game shows on the GSN schedule and their sometimes anachronistic elements, the network itself, and each other.

== Hosts ==
- Bob Guiney (June 2009 – July 2011)
- Annie Duke (July 2009 – May 2011)
- Todd Newton (June 2009 – May 2011)
- Jai Rodriguez (April 2009 – May 2011)
- Heidi Bohay (February 2008 – April 2010)
- Fred Roggin (February 2008 – July 2009)
- Kelly Packard (September 2008 – November 2008)
- Alfonso Ribeiro (September 2008 – August 2009)
- Debra Wilson (May 2009 – January 2010)
