= Carson's Comedy Classics =

American television show

Carson's Comedy Classics is a stripped half-hour syndicated television show that was first released to American television stations in 1985.

The program was made from segments and sketches taken from the first 20 years of The Tonight Show Starring Johnny Carson (1962–82). Johnny Carson's full tenure on the program, which originally aired on the NBC Television Network, was from 1962 to 1992. The series is narrated by Ed McMahon, who, as a voiceover, introduces the program and each of the segments.

== Background ==
The series was one of the results of Carson coming to terms with NBC on a contract extension in 1981. In exchange for his continued services, Carson received ownership of the show, including the rights to the entire extant archive of his hosting span. Carson's Comedy Classics was one of the most immediate ways Carson cashed in on his product; he and his staff created a clip show consisting of highlights from the 20 years of The Tonight Show Carson had hosted up to that point and sold the rights to Columbia Pictures Television for $26 million.

When Carson would have his annual Tonight Show Anniversary Show in prime time on NBC, the anniversary shows were mainly flashback clip shows, and it was usually the same vintage sketches which got the showcase on the shows (examples being Ed Ames' classic miffed tomahawk throw from 1965, Carson and Jack Webb doing a sketch about Copper Clappers from 1968, and John Twomey playing "Stars and Stripes Forever" with his hands from 1974; later anniversary shows would feature stand-up comedians, new sketches and clips from the previous year of Tonight Shows). The popularity of the anniversary shows helped lead to the creation of Carson's Comedy Classics, which is essentially a classic clip show edited down to a half an hour. Carson's Comedy Classics showed that there were many other classic sketches and segments that had rarely if ever been seen between the original airing and 1982–1983 (when the show was put into production). Many of the sketches and segments in Carson's Comedy Classics have never been released on DVD either.

Each segment was carefully edited to avoid any reference to "The Tonight Show" or "NBC" (as NBC was, then as now, the owner of the Tonight Show trademark). Recurring segments were classic Carnac the Magnificent, Aunt Blabby, Floyd R. Turbo, Stump the Band, Tea Time Movie and other sketches as well as vintage and memorable bits with animal trainers Jim Fowler and Joan Embery and the animals they brought on The Tonight Show. There are also moments where there are segments where Carson would do an activity, like learning karate (he broke a plywood board with his head on one episode), gymnastics, or volleyball, and even trying to start a campfire in a race to do so spearheaded by some Boy Scouts. Many clips also showcase celebrities with Carson, usually in sketches; George C. Scott, Juliet Prowse, Bob Hope and Don Rickles among others. The Tonight Show stock regulars who were unknowns but may have had a few lines here and there in certain sketches were referred to as The Carson Comedy Players in the opening credits of Carson's Comedy Classics (longtime Tonight Show stalwart Carol Wayne also appears in many Tea Time Movie sketches). And of course, Ed McMahon, who was Carson's sidekick and announcer, and stayed with Johnny for Carson's entire Tonight Show run (1962–1992), is prominently featured in Carson's Comedy Classics. McMahon also narrates the opening credits on the program as well. Final credits in each episode give mention to the staff of The Tonight Show and the producers and staff of Carson's Comedy Classics separately.

The programs themselves have no real running order to them and thus could be broadcast in any order chosen by the station, usually late in the evening.

The program was produced and directed by Kenneth J. Koerner for Carson Productions and syndicated by Columbia Pictures Television.

== Other appearances ==
Family Channel aired reruns of the show during its late-afternoon/early-evening and midnight time slots from October 1, 1996 until September 27, 1997. Family Channel censored certain segments that contained racial, sexually lewd or "gay" jokes. This would often be noticeable when scenes "flip". This would happen mostly during the 'Carnac' segments when certain questions or "curses" would be censored by Family Channel.

In Australia, the show aired on the Nine Network throughout the 1980s and 1990s in various timeslots. Since then, reruns have aired on FOX Classics.

In 2008, the Chicago-based TV station Me-Too (WMEU-CA) began to air the show late at night. As of January 1, 2009, the station no longer airs the show.

Since the summer of 2009, ReelzChannel has aired reruns of the show in the 8:00 AM to 9:00 AM ET Monday through Friday morning block. Reruns have also aired on Comcast's Video on Demand.

== Pop culture ==
In The Simpsons episode "Simpsoncalifragilisticexpiala(Annoyed Grunt)cious," Krusty the Clown hosted a similarly named program, the Krusty Komedy Klassic, live at the Apollo Theater. He is promptly booed by the audience for having the show's initials, KKK, prominently displayed on the stage.
