= List of The Tonight Show Starring Johnny Carson episodes =

This is the list of episodes for The Tonight Show Starring Johnny Carson, which aired from October 1, 1962 to May 22, 1992. Lists include first-run episodes only and do not include Best of Carson rebroadcasts.

== See also ==
- List of The Tonight Show episodes
