= Heidi Bohay =

American actress and television presenter

- Born: 1959 or 1960 (age 66–67)
- Occupation: Television hostess/actress
- Years active: 1979–present
- Spouse: Michael Spound (m. 1988)
- Children: 3

Heidi Bohay (born 1959 or 1960) is an American actress and television presenter.

Bohay was a 1977 graduate of Bound Brook High School. Her parents operated a short-order restaurant in Somerset County, New Jersey. She was homecoming queen in high school, and the school's drama coach helped her to obtain her first paying job — portraying a cheerleader in a commercial for Colgate. After she made more commercials, she left New York to go to Los Angeles, where she began appearing in television programs. Between acting opportunities she supported herself by doing a variety of jobs, including sales, typing, and housesitting.

Bohay is best known for her role as Megan Kendall from 1983 to 1987 on the prime-time ABC drama Hotel.

She appeared as a celebrity guest on game shows, including The $25,000 and $100,000 Pyramid, All-Star Blitz, Hollywood Squares, and New Liar's Club. She was the hostess of the cable television shows American Baby and Party at Home. She had co-hosted the interactive TV show GSN Live on GSN from the show's debut on February 25, 2008.

== Filmography ==
Film and television
Year	Title	Role	Notes
1979	Voices	Girl Friend	
1980	Hart to Hart	Emily	Episode: "A Question of Innocence"
1980	Buck Rogers in the 25th Century	Maya	Episode: "Buck's Duel to the Death"
1980	CHiPs	Corky	Episode: "The Great 5K Star Race and Boulder Wrap Party: Part 1"; Episode: "The Great 5K Star Race and Boulder Wrap Party: Part 2"
1980	Happy Days	Margaret	Episode: "Fools Rush In"
1981	Happy Days	Terry	Episode: "Home Movies: Part 1"; Episode: "Home Movies: Part 2"
1981	Quincy, M.E.	Sherry Anderson	Episode: "The Golden Hour"
1981	Child Bride of Short Creek	Lola	TV movie
1982	Teachers Only	Victoria	Episode: "The Dreyfuss Affair"
1982	Superstition	Ann Leahy	
1983	Thursday's Child	Ruthie	TV movie
1983	Grace Kelly	Elizabeth 'Lizanne' Kelly	TV movie
1983–1987	Hotel	Megan Kendall	100 episodes
1984	The Love Boat	Suzy Rand; Missy	2 episodes
1985	Finder of Lost Loves	Cindy Murdock / Sheena Fontaine	Episode: "Wayward Dreams"
1986	Az aranyifjú		TV movie
1986	The Love Boat	Jerry Sullivan Bricker	Episode: "The Shipshape Cruise"
1987	Murder, She Wrote	Donna Crenshaw	Episode: "Indian Giver"
1990	Murder, She Wrote	Amy Sue Kriegler	Episode: "See You in Court, Baby"
1996	Arli$$	Episode: "The Stuff That Dreams Are Made Of"	
1997	Party at Home	Host	TV series
2004	Cold Case	Sally Frandsen (1987)	Episode: "Maternal Instincts"
2011	The Defenders	Mary	Episode: "Nevada v. Wayne"
