= Hotel (American TV series) =

American soap opera

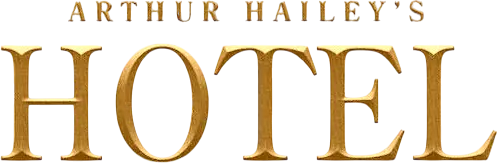
- Created by: Aaron Spelling
- Developed by: John Furia Jr. Barry Oringer
- Starring: Anne Baxter; James Brolin; Connie Sellecca; Shea Farrell; Nathan Cook; Michael Spound; Heidi Bohay; Shari Belafonte
- Music by: Henry Mancini
- Country of origin: United States
- Original language: English
- No. of seasons: 5
- No. of episodes: 114

Production
- Running time: 48–49 minutes
- Production company: Aaron Spelling Productions

Original release
- Network: ABC
- Release: September 21, 1983 – May 5, 1988

Hotel is an American primetime soap opera series that aired on ABC from September 21, 1983, to May 5, 1988, in the timeslot following Dynasty.

Based on Arthur Hailey's 1965 novel of the same name (which had also inspired a 1967 feature film), the series was produced by Aaron Spelling and set in the elegant and fictitious St. Gregory Hotel in San Francisco (changed from the New Orleans setting of the novel and film). Establishing shots of the hotel were filmed in front of the Fairmont San Francisco atop the Nob Hill neighborhood. Some interiors for the pilot episode were also filmed inside the Fairmont; when the series was picked up, a three-quarter-scale replica of the lobby was built at Warner Bros. Studios Burbank.

Episodes followed the activities of passing guests, as well as the personal and professional lives of the hotel staff.

The distribution rights to the series were originally owned by Warner Bros. Television Distribution, until 2006 when CBS Paramount Network Television bought the television libraries and properties of Spelling Entertainment Inc. from Paramount Pictures Domestic Distribution and Viacom Enterprises.

== Premise ==
Rich aristocrat Victoria Cabot (Anne Baxter) runs the St. Gregory Hotel, assisted by general manager Peter McDermott (James Brolin) and his staff. McDermott and assistant general manager Christine Francis (Connie Sellecca) became romantically involved. Halfway through the series Cabot died, leaving McDermott her share of the St. Gregory Hotel. When McDermott inherited half of the St. Gregory, he ran the hotel and promoted Francis to general manager.

Other staff members included: the guest relations director Mark Danning (Shea Farrell); ex-conman now head of hotel security Billy Griffin (Nathan Cook); reception manager Julie Gillette (Shari Belafonte); young couple Dave and Megan Kendall (real life spouses Michael Spound and Heidi Bohay), a bellhop and a desk clerk, respectively; and Harry the bartender (Harry George Phillips). Characters Eric Lloyd (Ty Miller); Cheryl Dolan (Valerie Landsburg) and Ryan Thomas (Susan Walters) were added to the cast during its final season.

Cast members Brolin and Sellecca appeared in every episode of the series. In later years, Efrem Zimbalist Jr., made numerous guest appearances as an opponent of Victoria Cabot and Peter McDermott who plants his daughter, played by Michelle Phillips, in the hotel staff as the concierge.

Bette Davis appeared in the pilot episode as hotel owner Laura Trent, and publicity for the series indicated that Davis was to be a regular on the program. However, the onset of ill health forced Davis to withdraw from the series and Anne Baxter, who had played her nemesis in the 1950 film All About Eve, was brought in as Victoria Cabot, Mrs. Trent's sister-in-law. When Davis' health improved it was intended to bring her back; however, with Baxter on board fulfilling the series matriarchal role it was decided to make Davis' character an offscreen character, who though mentioned, was never seen. Ironically, Davis would outlive Baxter by four years and the series itself by over a year.

Similar to Spelling's other ABC show, The Love Boat, episodes of Hotel relied heavily on the appearance of recognizable guest stars. However, unlike The Love Boat's comedic story lines, Hotel broached slightly more serious and controversial subject matter, such as abortion, infidelity, rape, suicide, AIDS, homophobia, spousal abuse and child molestation.

== Episodes ==
=== Pilot (1983) ===
Title	Directed by	Written by	Original release date
"Hotel"	Jerry London	John Furia, Jr. & Barry Oringer	September 21, 1983
A hooker (Morgan Fairchild) is beaten and raped by four rich kids, of which the ringleader's father (Lloyd Bochner) is a rich and imperious man. A young singer (Erin Moran) is given her big chance by Mel Tormé. A suffering, sensitive divorcee (Pernell Roberts) helps a woman (Shirley Jones) give her philandering husband a taste of his own medicine. The King of Portugal (Alejandro Rey) checks into the hotel for a rest and leaves with a former hash-slinger (Stephanie Faracy). A man (Jack Gilford) dies of a heart attack during an affair. An overbearing couple (Bill Macy and Lainie Kazan) also checks in. Guest stars: Lloyd Bochner as Bradford Sievers, Morgan Fairchild as Carol, Stephanie Faracy as Judy Gillette, Jack Gilford as Max, Shirley Jones as Claire Langley, Bette Davis as Laura Trent, Lainie Kazan as Fay Wells, Bill Macy as Herman Wells, Erin Moran as Karen Donnelly, Alejandro Rey as King Fernando, Pernell Roberts as Charles Stanton, and Mel Tormé as himself.

=== Season 1 (1983–84) ===
No. overall	No. in season	Title	Directed by	Written by	Original release date	Prod. code
1	1	"Blackout"	Robert Scheerer	Bill & Jo LaMond	September 28, 1983	001
Laura Trent's sister-in-law, the hotel administrator, is visited by an old flame, Christine receives threatening letters from a would-be suitor, and a pregnant woman runs out on her fiance. Guest stars: Stewart Granger as Tony Fielding, Richard Hatch as Don Walden, and Tracy Nelson as Isabel Darby.
2	2	"Choices"	Richard Kinon	Andrew Laskos	October 5, 1983	004
A beauty contestant (Heather Locklear) decides if she should compromise her morals in an effort to influence a contest judge, and Billy is reunited with a professional thief who has designs on both Julie and the hotel vault. Guest stars: Robert Hooks as Frank 'Squire' Vance, Heather Locklear as Miranda Hardwick, Peter Marshall as Garrett Rhodes, and Connie Stevens as Barbara Hardwick.
3	3	"Charades"	Jerome Courtland	Geoffrey Fischer	October 19, 1983	002
The staff is on pins and needles when a visiting politician is marked for assassination, and a troubled woman wanders the halls trying to pick up tricks as a prostitute. Guest stars: Peggy Cass as Sheila, Ron Ely as Evan Paige, Nanette Fabray as Harriet Gold, Hermione Gingold as Felicity, Christopher Norris as Patricia St. Claire, Dick Van Patten as Herbert Pitts, and Robert Vaughn as an assassin.
4	4	"Secrets"	Bruce Bilson	James Fritzhand	October 26, 1983	003
A college student (Leigh McCloskey) hired as a babysitter is accused of molesting his charge, but the victim (Carrie Wells) points the finger of guilt at an unlikely party. A buddy of Peter (Dack Rambo), a priest on sabbatical, is introduced to the joys of the flesh and must make up his mind about his vocation. Guest stars: Leigh McCloskey as Hank Miller, Michelle Phillips as Gerry Howland, Dack Rambo as Chad Lawrence, Robert Reed as Phil Jamison, Leigh Taylor-Young as Carole Jamison, and Carrie Wells as Amy Jamison.
5	5	"Relative Loss"	Richard Kinon	E. Jack Kaplan	November 2, 1983	006
An affair with a young newswoman could destroy a candidate's (Paul Burke) presidential ambitions. Meanwhile, Mrs. Cabot's niece plots to get Christine fired so she can assume that post with the hotel. Guest stars: Paul Burke as Senator Tom Andrews, Hope Lange as Gwen Andrews, Donna Pescow as Gloria Beck, Lynn Redgrave as Carly Knight, Vic Tayback as Wallace Egan, and Charlene Tilton as Holly Lane.
6	6	"Flashback"	Bruce Bilson	Geoffrey Fischer & John Furia, Jr. & Barry Oringer	November 9, 1983	005
Peter's ex-wife (Cathy Lee Crosby) makes an unexpected appearance, and Christine and Mark arrange for a romance for a depressed guest (Diana Canova). Guest stars: Diana Canova as Nancy Domenico, Cathy Lee Crosby as Janet Weaver McDermott, Ken Kercheval as Leo Cooney, John McIntire as Donald Blackwell, and Jeanette Nolan as Edith Krause.
7	7	"Confrontations"	Harry Harris	James Fritzhand	November 16, 1983	008
A convention of racial supremacists, who try to practice their policy at the St. Gregory, communicating with a street mime proves helpful for a mute young woman (Dawn Jeffory). Guest stars: Scatman Crothers as Garland Fisk, Abby Dalton as Helen Scofield, Dawn Jeffory as Andrea Scofield, Martin Landau as Russell Slocum, Maidie Norman as Carrie Garland, and Parker Stevenson as Michael.
8	8	"Faith, Hope & Charity"	Alf Kjellin	Thom Thomas	November 23, 1983	007
A visiting family is embarrassed when one member (Scott Baio) faces charges of shoplifting, and an unexpected twist mars the long-awaited reunion of two college friends (Carol Lynley and Barbara Parkins). Guest stars: Scott Baio as Nick Tomasino, Michael Constantine as Mr. Tomasino, Elaine Joyce as Ms. Gleason, Carol Lynley as Zane Elliott, Barbara Parkins as Eileen Weston, Don Porter as Jonathan Corry, and DeAnna Robbins as Donna Corry.
9	9	"Deceptions"	Curtis Harrington	John Furia, Jr. & Barry Oringer	November 30, 1983	010
Hillary (Pat Klous) is shattered when a vacation romance at Puerto Vallarta turns into sexual blackmail, Mrs. Cabot meddles in the life of a lonely widower, and Billy discovers a street urchin living off the fruits of the St. Gregory. Guest stars: John Davidson as Michael Robson, Elinor Donahue as Louise, James Houghton as Rob, Pat Klous (credited as Patricia Klous) as Hillary Lindamont, Jeremy Licht as Cat Locatelli, and Jean Simmons as Milly Toland.
10	10	"The Offer"	Don Chaffey	Ross Teel & Geoffrey Fischer	December 7, 1983	009
Peter is courted by Mrs. Cabot's rival who threatens to take him from the hotel; an ambitious journalist goes after a rock singer; a couple (Margaret O'Brien and Donald O'Connor) returns to relive their wedding day at the St. Gregory with entertainer Liberace. Guest stars: Albert Hague as Dr. Kazmir, Arte Johnson as Eddie, Dianne Kay as Jennifer Jane Powell, Lorenzo Lamas as Diz Wilder, Liberace as himself, Margaret O'Brien as Martha Connelly, Donald O'Connor as David Connelly, Eleanor Parker as Leslie DeVere, and Craig Stevens as Craig Chase.
11	11	"Christmas"	Philip Leacock	Maryanne Kasica & Michael Scheff	December 21, 1983	012
A bus-boy forced into setting up a robbery masterminded by his brother, learns of an impending promotion and fears going through with the heist; Lisa (Tori Spelling), wishing for a baby brother, is fascinated by a robot on display at the hotel, and discovers that his "master" is divorced, as is her mother, and she schemes to unite them, and a $10 bill bearing a telephone number, which Peter needs in order to reach his special friend, returns to him after passing through numerous hands in the hotel. Guest stars: Karen Grassle as Susan Walker, Martin Hewitt as Ray Follard, Robert Pine as Paul Manning, Tori Spelling as Lisa Walker, Iggie Wolfington as Nicholas Edmund, and Jane Wyatt as Agnes Simpson.
12	12	"Designs"	Don Chaffey	James Fritzhand	December 28, 1983	013
Peter falls victim to Cupid's arrow at a charity luncheon where he meets a wealthy socialite with a secret; Megan starts knitting booties, and Christine is drafted as a model in a fashion show. Guest stars: Gary Collins as Cody Blake, Monte Markham as Daniel Brunell, Constance McCashin as Allison Brunell, and Cristina Raines as Diana Aikin.
13	13	"Reflections"	Vincent McEveety	Robert E. Swanson	January 4, 1984	011
The daughter (Danielle Brisebois) of divorced parents (John McCook and Joanna Pettet) attempts to reconcile them, a financially troubled man (McLean Stevenson) tries to swindle the hotel, and two women compete for the attention of one man. Guest stars: Danielle Brisebois as Darcy Chapman, Kay Lenz as Mary Morowsky, John McCook as Dr. Frank Chapman, Joanna Pettet as Lauren Chapman, McLean Stevenson as Harry Gilford, and Karen Woncemore as Monique Bennett.: Recording dates 10/14- 10/21/83
14	14	"Tomorrows"	Philip Leacock	Story by : David P. Harmon & Geoffrey Fischer; Teleplay by : Geoffrey Fischer	January 11, 1984	014
Mrs. Cabot unites a prince (Jon-Erik Hexum) with a maid (Emma Samms), a law student (Timothy Patrick Murphy) discovers his mother (Adrienne Barbeau) has become dependent upon drugs. Guest stars: Adrienne Barbeau as Barbara Harrington, Phil Coccioletti (credited as Philip Coccioletti) as Frank Rowland, Jon-Erik Hexum as Prince Erik, Anne Jeffreys as Mrs. Jenks, Timothy Patrick Murphy as Andy, Emma Samms as Kathleen Shaye, and Robert Sterling as Mr. Jenks.
15	15	"Passages"	Jerome Courtland	Story by : Bill & Jo LaMond and Mann Rubin; Teleplay by : Bill & Jo LaMond	January 18, 1984	015
A bar mitzvah celebration at the hotel nearly turns to tragedy when the father of the boy spies a concentration camp survivor who was responsible for the death of thousands of Jews and wants to take vngeance into his own hands. A wealthy industrialist sends his trusted aide to retrieve his willful daughter at tie St. Gregory, but surprisingly the encounter turns romantic. Guest stars: José Ferrer as Alex Huff, Pamela Hensley as Brooke Whitfield, Ken Howard as Bill Tillery, and Barnard Hughes as Joe Freilich.
16	16	"Mistaken Identities"	Philip Leacock	Story by : Mann Rubin & James Fritzhand; Teleplay by : James Fritzhand	February 1, 1984	018
A teenager faces a test of manhood that unexpectedly backfires; two bickering hotel employees discover they are secret pen pals. Guest stars: Phyllis Davis as Claire Thompson, Steve Kanaly as Ed Kerwin, Lance Kerwin as Ron Kerwin, Tom Smothers as Sam, and Carlene Watkins as Karen Halveston.
17	17	"The Wedding"	Vincent McEveety	Andrew Laskos	February 22, 1984	019
The families of a couple (Mary Crosby and Boyd Gaines) about to be wed could be destroyed by a woman's (Patty McCormack) dark secret; the bride's parents (Dina Merrill and Robert Stack) face an emotional trial; financial ruin threatens the father of the groom (Steve Forrest). Guest stars: Mary Crosby as Maggie Blackwood, Steve Forrest as Gil Strider, Boyd Gaines as Jeff Strider, Patty McCormack (credited as Patricia McCormack) as Paula, Dina Merrill as Eleanor Blackwood, Vera Miles as Teresa Clayborne, and Robert Stack as Lewis Blackwood.
18	18	"Memories"	Kim Friedman	Bill & Jo LaMond	February 29, 1984	017
Christine falls in love with an amnesiac (Roy Thinnes) involved in murder and robbery; two couples (Katherine Cannon and Rod McCary, Larry Wilcox and Cassie Yates) try to conceive a baby for the childless pair. Guest stars: Katherine Cannon as Dana Peterson, Rod McCary as Skip Peterson, Roy Thinnes as John White, Larry Wilcox as Brad Koburg, and Cassie Yates as Jennifer Koburg.
19	19	"Encores"	Curtis Harrington	Thom Thomas	March 7, 1984	016
Peter learns he is the father of a 4-year-old child; a former singer (Engelbert Humperdinck) with a drug dependency makes a comeback at the St. Gregory; Julie discovers she has a secret admirer. Guest stars: Marilyn Hassett as Joanne Maxwell, Bo Hopkins as Walt Solanski, Engelbert Humperdinck as Danny Maxwell, Steven Keats as Bix Coleman, and Jan Smithers as Lacey Grant.
20	20	"Prisms"	Corey Bechman	Story by : Robert E. Swanson & David P. Harmon; Teleplay by : Robert E. Swanson	March 14, 1984	020
The daughter (Morgan Brittany) of a jewel thief (Louis Jourdan) embroils Peter in a robbery scheme; a man (Don Galloway) and wife (Markie Post) reunite after his mental breakdown; an actress (Eva Gabor) stages a comeback after 20 years. Guest stars: Morgan Brittany as Marila Collins, Bradford Dillman as Paul Stanton, Eva Gabor as Anna Bronti, Don Galloway as Ron Bowman, Louis Jourdan as Adam Vidocq, and Markie Post as Jill Stanton.
21	21	"Trials"	Bruce Bilson	Geoffrey Fischer	May 2, 1984	021
Mrs. Cabot and Peter are held at gunpoint in the penthouse; Mark agrees to help a flashdancer-interior designer (Lydia Cornell) with an elaborate ruse to impress her minister-father (Lew Ayres). Guest stars: Lew Ayres as Nelson O'Neil, Lonny Chapman as Edgar Ellsworth, Lydia Cornell as Doris O'Neil, Gary Frank as Luther, and Shelley Winters as Adele Ellsworth.
22	22	"Lifelines"	Joseph B. Wallenstein	Story by : Gerald K. Siegel; Teleplay by : James Fritzhand	May 9, 1984	022
A former Queen of racy films (Sally Kellerman) who is now a successful business executive is threatened with extortion by a man from her past (Mitchell Ryan); a young unwed mother (Melissa Sue Anderson) struggles to give her child up for adoption. Guest stars: Denise Alexander as Gail McLain, Melissa Sue Anderson as Cassie Ray, Howard Duff as Byron Comstock, Sally Kellerman as Lauren Webb, Mitchell Ryan as Steve Cutler, and Ted Shackelford as Tom Webb.

=== Season 2 (1984–85) ===
No. overall	No. in season	Title	Directed by	Written by	Original release date	Prod. code
23	1	"Intimate Strangers"	Vincent McEveety	Story by : James Fritzhand; Teleplay by : Bill & Jo LaMond	September 26, 1984	028
A frightened former movie star (Elizabeth Taylor) fires her confidant (Roddy McDowall); an executive sees the husband who abandoned her.
24	2	"Flesh and Blood"	Bruce Bilson	Geoffrey Fischer	October 10, 1984	024
A hotel worker meets her sister for the first time; Peter and Billy must stop a girl from becoming a prostitute; guest Efrem Zimbalist Jr.
25	3	"Fantasies"	Bruce Bilson	Story by : Allison Hock; Teleplay by : James Fritzhand & Sheila R. Allen	October 17, 1984	023
An old flame (Ben Murphy) elegantly woos Christine; Peter must stop a friend's (Deborah Adair) revenge on an abusive husband.
26	4	"Transitions"	Charles S. Dubin	Andrew Laskos	October 24, 1984	027
A woman discovers her husband's bisexuality; Christine features in a television advertisement; Mark instructs a secretary in social etiquette.
27	5	"Outsiders"	Vincent McEveety	Robert E. Swanson	October 31, 1984	030
A college student yields to pressure; a novelist becomes enamored of a literary critic; the staff discovers that Mrs. Cabot will spend Thanksgiving alone.
28	6	"Vantage Point"	Jerome Courtland	James Fritzhand	November 7, 1984	029
Mrs. Cabot progresses in managing the hotel; a college reunion evokes emotions for Peter; a playboy swaps roles with a bellhop.
29	7	"Ideals"	Bill LaMond	Thom Thomas	November 14, 1984	033
In defiance of the parents' wishes, Christine battles for a girl's medical care; Mark pops the question to an older professional lady.
30	8	"Final Chapters"	Kim Friedman	James Fritzhand	November 21, 1984	026
Billy and his father get back together; a groom falls in love with a girl who jumps out of a cake; Mrs. Cabot's adolescent nephew adores Christine.
31	9	"Fallen Idols"	Georg Stanford Brown	Bill & Jo LaMond	November 28, 1984	025
A middle-aged couple who fall in love find that they were friends as teenagers; Dave's marriage is strained by his side gig.
32	10	"Promises"	Kevin Hooks	Geoffrey Fischer	December 5, 1984	034
A masseuse enters into a contract with an illegal foreigner; Christine's godfather courted Mrs. Cabot; an actor examines Peter.
33	11	"Love and Honor"	Robert Scheerer	Andrew Laskos	December 12, 1984	036
A British national (Bruce Davison) suspected of human trafficking is protected by diplomatic immunity; a woman meets her benefactor (Steve Kanaly).
34	12	"New Beginnings"	Joseph B. Wallenstein	Alan Mandel	December 19, 1984	040
A father (Vincent Baggetta) is an unsuitable bone-marrow donor for his son; a spinster (Vera Miles) falls for a professional escort.
35	13	"Crossroads"	Bruce Bilson	Alan Landsberg	January 2, 1985	032
A woman (Emma Samms) challenges her father's choice of son-in-law; a vagrant divulges a secret; Christine might require a mastectomy.
36	14	"Anniversary"	James Brolin	Alan Mandel	January 9, 1985	031
A 35th anniversary is ruined by deceit; Peter's ex-wife arrives from Paris; Michael's ex-wife returns to talk about their daughter.
37	15	"Distortions"	Burt Brinckerhoff	Story by : Gary Kott; Teleplay by : Andrew Laskos	January 16, 1985	038
An Indiana garment designer (Mary Crosby) has a beauty therapy that transforms her marriage; a desperate married woman accuses Peter of rape.
38	16	"Sleeping Dogs"	Richard Wells	Marianne Kasica & Michael Scheff	January 23, 1985	042
Peter worries about an audit; Christine meets up with three college pals; and a woman falls for her husband's murderer.
39	17	"Bystanders"	Bill LaMond	Story by : James Fritzhand; Teleplay by : Bill & Jo LaMond	January 30, 1985	039
A bellman is shocked by a pro football reunion; a man discovers his father is seeing his ex-girlfriend; an artist sends his pen pal a picture of Peter.
40	18	"Identities"	Jerome Courtland	Kimmer Ringwald	February 13, 1985	037
A pianist's reunion with an old lover but spoiled by a jealous wife; Mark is charged with assault; A young genius gains access to the hotel's computer.
41	19	"Images"	Charles S. Dubin	Andrew Laskos	February 20, 1985	045
A woman discovers that beauty isn't everything; Christine inherits a limousine and driver; A relocated witness working at the hotel confronts her history.
42	20	"Skeletons"	Kim Friedman	Story by : Jerry Kaufmann & Jerry Sedley; Teleplay by : James Fritzhand	February 27, 1985	044
Mark forgets a debt to Dave and Megan; a man wants to die at the hotel on ancestral land; an executive jeopardizes everything by falling in love with an ex-convict.
43	21	"Illusions"	Gabrielle Beaumont	Vincent Virom Coppola	March 6, 1985	041
Before being given a life achievement award, a guy passes out; Peter courts a newswoman who had previously saved his life; and Piper Laurie is a guest.
44	22	"Detours"	James Brolin	Story by : Maxine Herman; Teleplay by : Tom Sawyer	March 13, 1985	043
A father seeks forgiveness from his family; songwriters bring back a show and romance; Mrs. Cabot develops a medication addiction.
45	23	"Resolutions"	Jerome Courtland	Greg Strangis	March 20, 1985	046
A youthful romance is ruined by the rivalry between sibling vintners; Dave's pal enters a wine-tasting competition with his own product.
46	24	"Obsessions"	Kevin Connor	Geoffrey Fischer	March 27, 1985	047
An admirer canine a soap opera star; a sequestered juror falls in love with a fellow jury; and a shoeshine boy works in the hotel.
47	25	"Lost and Found"	Kim Friedman	Thom Thomas	April 3, 1985	035
Peter has a midlife crisis; Dave and Megan's marriage is strained by outside forces; and parents and daughter reconnect.
48	26	"Wins and Losses"	Jerome Courtland	Michael Marks	April 10, 1985	049
Peter tries to cure a teenage alcoholic; Christine, the manager of the softball team, falls in love with her opponent (Tony Roberts) from a rival hotel.
49	27	"Passports"	Bill LaMond	James Fritzhand	May 8, 1985	050
Love intertwines the lives of Julie, a singer and songwriter; the parents of a tennis prodigy wish to return to the Soviet Union.
50	28	"Hearts and Minds"	Charles S. Dubin	Kimmer Ringwald	May 15, 1985	048
Christine loses a wager to Mrs. Cabot's acquaintance; a mistress (Julia Duffy) is evicted; an actress (Jean Simmons) fights Alzheimer's.

=== Season 3 (1985–86) ===
No. overall	No. in season	Title	Directed by	Written by	Original release date	Prod. code
51	1	"Missing Pieces"	Gabrielle Beaumont	Story by : Carol Saraceno & Michael Marks; Teleplay by : Michael Marks	September 25, 1985	052
Christine's boyfriend (Patrick Duffy) experiences psychotic episodes; two professionals find love; Mrs. Cabot assists the hotel's oldest employee.
52	2	"Rallying City"	Bruce Bilson	James Fritzhand	October 2, 1985	053
Peter is badly injured in a car accident; a girl's relatives fight a will that gives custody of her to a homosexual man.
53	3	"Imperfect Union"	Charles S. Dubin	Geoffrey Fischer	October 9, 1985	054
A woman from Peter's past kidnaps her own child; a mentally challenged couple struggles for freedom.
54	4	"Pathways"	Charles S. Dubin	Mitch Paradise	October 16, 1985	058
Megan is raped; a wealthy woman (Audrey Meadows) allows an impoverished accident victim (Eddie Albert) to remain in her room.
55	5	"Second Offense"	Burt Brinckerhoff	James Fritzhand	October 30, 1985	055
A novelist just released from prison conducts a news conference; a lady intends to gratify her grandmother by introducing Dave as her fiance.
56	6	"Saving Grace"	Jerome Courtland	Story by : Donna Pekkonen & Andrew Laskos; Teleplay by : Andrew Laskos	December 4, 1985	057
A woman who cares for a crippled dancer is haunted by a secret; an employee is ashamed of her coal-miner father.
57	7	"Echoes"	James Brolin	Story by : Mark D. Kaufmann; Teleplay by : Robert E. Swanson	December 11, 1985	059
A man (Christopher Atkins) claims to be the late Mr. Cabot's son; while a woman (Mimi Kuzyk) finds out a mystery about her fiancé.
58	8	"Celebrations"	Richard Compton	Andrew Laskos	December 18, 1985	056
A woman wishes to marry a millionaire; Mrs. Cabot's father-in-law comes for a celebration of the hotel's 75th anniversary; a pregnant maid risks deportation.
59	9	"Cry Wolf"	Nancy Malone	James Fritzhand	December 25, 1985	060
Two police officers say they saw a murder in the garage; Christine's aunt adores a gigolo.
60	10	"Shadows of Doubt: Part 1"	Bruce Bilson	Story by : Michael Marks & Barry Pollack; Teleplay by : Michael Marks	January 8, 1986	061
An assassin is interested in Christine's romance; college friends get together; a security guard appears to be dishonest.
61	11	"Shadows of Doubt: Part 2"	Bruce Bilson	Story by : Michael Marks & Barry Pollack; Teleplay by : Michael Marks	January 15, 1986	062
Patterson places a bomb in the hotel basement; Christine gets entangled in Adam's lethal espionage.
62	12	"Scapegoats"	Jerome Courtland	James Fritzhand	January 22, 1986	069
Peter finds himself in the midst of a romantic triangle; a hotel bartender finds out he has AIDS and learns the true meaning of intolerance.
63	13	"Recriminations"	Nancy Malone	Story by : Arlene Stadd; Teleplay by : Arlene Stadd & Mitch Paradise	January 29, 1986	067
The mother and closest friend of a sophomore in college are in love; Mrs. Cabot intends to wed the police chief of Atlantic City.
64	14	"Child's Play"	Gabrielle Beaumont	Mitch Paradise	February 5, 1986	065
A couple's retirement preparations are disrupted by a pregnancy; Peter fears a teenage acquaintance will appear in a pornographic film.
65	15	"Facades"	Bruce Bilson	Robert E. Swanson	February 12, 1986	051
A mother meets her husband's (Charles Siebert) Amerasian child; a money launderer (Erin Gray) profits off a past romance with Peter.
66	16	"Lovelines"	Alan Cooke	Michael Marks	February 19, 1986	068
A radio psychologist, is threatened by a caller (Susan Blakely); Christine intends to adopt an 8-year-old victim of molestation.
67	17	"Heroes"	Jerome Courtland	Steven Smith	February 26, 1986	071
A jack-of-all-trades looks for work; a teacher tortures a student; and a veteran encounters the man (Haing S. Ngor) who tortured him in Vietnam.
68	18	"Harassed"	Mike Robe	Story by : Bruce Shelly; Teleplay by : Michael Marks & Bruce Shelly	March 5, 1986	064
Julie is sexually harassed by Peter's old friend, the new hotel services director; a bride meets her mother (Nanette Fabray), who owns a flower stall.
69	19	"Triangles"	James Brolin	Matt Geller	March 12, 1986	070
A woman thinks she's dating a married man; newlyweds say they were robbed; a marriage struggles after the male had heart surgery.
70	20	"Hidden Talents"	James Brolin	Chris Manheim	March 19, 1986	066
An aerospace engineer challenges her husband's political and marital allegiances; Julie develops feelings for a competitor on a TV talent show.
71	21	"Hearts Divided"	Gabrielle Beaumont	Andrew Laskos	April 2, 1986	063
A female lawyer is planning to elope with a wanted criminal; a student filmmaker wants Megan to be the lead in a movie; and a teenager seems to be a faith healer.
72	22	"Changes of Heart"	James Brolin	Mitch Paradise	April 9, 1986	072
a British hotelier (John Mills), offers Peter his own establishment; a new security officer (Lola Falana), concentrates her attention on an enigmatic visitor.
73	23	"Promises to Keep"	Nancy Malone	James Fritzhand	April 30, 1986	073
An actress's daughter (Debbie Reynolds) writes a critical book about her early years; Christine becomes engaged to a physician (Charles Frank).
74	24	"Separations"	Bruce Bilson	Andrew Laskos	May 14, 1986	074
Peter's brother arrives with the leader (Bianca Jagger) of a Central American country; Christine decides to leave St. Gregory.
75	25	"Horizons"	Nancy Malone	Story by : Geoffrey Fischer & Michael Marks; Teleplay by : Geoffrey Fischer	May 21, 1986	075
When Peter elevates Julie to Christine's post without first consulting her, resentment and jealousy interrupt the farewell celebration.

=== Season 4 (1986–87) ===
No. overall	No. in season	Title	Directed by	Written by	Original release date	Prod. code
76	1	"Opening Moves"	Nancy Malone	Andrew Laskos	October 1, 1986	077
A lonely man falls in love with a call girl; Megan has to make a difficult choice; and Charles Cabot a co-owner of St. Gregory (Efrem Zimbalist) attempts to fire Peter.
77	2	"Queen's Gambit"	Richard Kinon	J. P. Brown	October 22, 1986	078
The Cabots fight Peter's legal reinstatement; a concierge (Michelle Phillips) searches for more than a job; lovers plot a husband's murder.
78	3	"Enemies Within"	Bruce Bilson	James Fritzhand	October 29, 1986	079
Charles advocates for thrift; an agoraphobic seeks refuge in the St. Gregory; and concierge Bradshaw has an affair with a married guest (Bert Convy).
79	4	"Double Jeopardy"	Alan Cooke	Story by : Garn Stephens & Emilie R. Small; Teleplay by : J. P. Brown & Garn Stephens & Emilie R. Small	November 5, 1986	080
A guest accuses Billy of murder; Elizabeth's actions concern Charles, who discovers her true identity; a man's double existence is revealed.
80	5	"Hornet's Nest"	James L. Conway	James Fritzhand	November 12, 1986	081
An acquaintance from the hotel bar assaults Elizabeth; A handsome scientist falls for a lovely heiress who is already betrothed to another man.
81	6	"Undercurrents"	Bruce Bilson	Duane Poole & Tom Swale	November 19, 1986	082
Charles and Elizabeth attempt to separate Peter and Christine, both professionally and romantically; a soldier experiences a sexual identity problem.
82	7	"Forsaking All Others"	Alan Cooke	Andrew Laskos	November 26, 1986	083
Two Australians propose to buy the hotel, which Charles finds appealing; Charles meets a lost love; and a wealthy recluse seeks his wife.
83	8	"Pressure Points"	Nancy Malone	Sandra Kay Siegel	December 3, 1986	084
Anxiety-ridden Christine has bulimia; a recently acquitted murder convict seeks peace and quiet at the St. Gregory.
84	9	"Restless Nights"	James Brolin	Duane Poole & Tom Swale	December 10, 1986	076
A wife engages in an affair to retaliate against her unfaithful husband; a lady who has recently lost her infant daughter longs for another child.
85	10	"Shadow Play"	Bruce Bilson	Steven Smith	December 17, 1986	085
A father encourages his son, a college basketball player, to perform better; the surviving spouses of two accident victims are drawn to one other.
86	11	"Pitfalls"	Roy Campanella II	Mitch Paradise	January 7, 1987	086
Dave uses drugs while studying for the bar test; Christine and Peter became housemates after renovating their flat; and a parolee betrays his mentor.
87	12	"Discoveries"	Jerome Courtland	Story by : Gary Rigdon; Teleplay by : Duane Poole & Tom Swale	January 14, 1987	087
Megan chooses to take action against Dave's amphetamine habit; Julie becomes embroiled in a feud between two famous actresses.
88	13	"Fast Forward"	Alan Cooke	Kimmer Ringwald	January 21, 1987	088
Dave's drug usage jeopardizes his future and career; after waking from a ten-year coma, a young woman revels in her attractiveness to men.
89	14	"Controlling Interests"	James Brolin	J.P. Brown	January 28, 1987	089
Dave fails the bar exam, forcing Megan to conceal her pregnancy; a competent professional woman must choose between two very different men.
90	15	"Unfinished Business"	James L. Conway	Doris Silverton	February 4, 1987	090
Peter's ex-wife reappears, reigniting their old relationship; a St. Gregory employee attempts to conceal his illiteracy from his boss and son.
91	16	"Fatal Attraction"	Jerome Courtland	James Fritzhand & Henry Colman	February 11, 1987	091
Peter is torn between his dying ex-wife and Christine; Dave's former fraternity conducts a horrible hazing prank on St. Gregory.
92	17	"Class of '72"	Vincent McEveety	Duane Poole & Tom Swale	March 4, 1987	092
At her fifteen-year high school reunion at the St. Gregory, Christine discovers that the married class hero ( Jeff Conaway), is trying to court her.
93	18	"Barriers"	Roy Campanella II	William Schmidt	March 11, 1987	094
Christine considers joining a labor relations board; Peter's niece moves in with him; a sex researcher entices a case subject.
94	19	"Glass People"	James Brolin	Andrew Laskos	March 18, 1987	093
At the St. Gregory, a group of prominent Hollywood figures produce a film that endorses Christine as a congressional candidate. guest: Stewart Granger.
95	20	"Second Thoughts"	Vincent McEveety	Sandra Kay Siegel	May 20, 1987	095
A friend who is widowed asks Peter to father her child; a divorcee and her daughter argue over the daughter's liaison with a pretty tour guide.
96	21	"Past Tense"	Nancy Malone	James Fritzhand	May 27, 1987	096-097
97	22	"All the King's Horses"	James L. Conway	Duane Poole & Tom Swale	May 27, 1987	096-097
Two fortune seekers compete for a wealthy widow; Christine's first love (Marc Singer), who was thought to be dead, reappears; A scammer claims to have located the missing granddaughter of a wealthy man; Peter dates a woman. A devoted grandfather meets a girl who might be his long-lost grandchild; Dave receives news; Peter and Christine attempt to patch things up.

=== Season 5 (1987–88) ===
No. overall	No. in season	Title	Directed by	Written by	Original release date	Prod. code
98	1	"Hail and Farewell"	Harry Falk	Duane Poole & Tom Swale	October 3, 1987	099
A deceased wife is contacted by a psychic; Christine seeks a different person to accompany her to a banquet than Peter; and Dave searches for a legal job.
99	2	"Mixed Emotions"	Robert Scheerer	Sandra Kay Siegel	October 10, 1987	107
David and Megan argue about his job offer in San Diego; Peter unintentionally starts seeing a dear friend's wife (Priscilla Barnes).
100	3	"Reservations"	Oz Scott	Gary Rigdon	October 24, 1987	103
Christine starts dating an older man; Peter's pal operates an escort service out of a hotel suite.
101	4	"And Baby Makes Two"	Harry Falk	Duane Poole & Tom Swale	October 31, 1987	104
Christine chooses to adopt a baby left at the St. Gregory; a philandering spouse learns his mistress has AIDS. Guest:Kay Lenz
102	5	"Born to Run"	Bruce Bilson	Jean Clarke	November 7, 1987	100
A neglected wife believes her husband is having an affair; Peter purchases a horse from friends and wins their daughter's affection.
103	6	"Desperate Moves"	Harry Falk	Erica Bryne	November 14, 1987	101
Peter's plane crashes on the way to a conference, leaving no survivors; a married mother and her daughter start dating the same man.
104	7	"Revelations"	Nancy Malone	Sandra Kay Siegel	November 21, 1987	105
The presence of Peter's grandma surprises him; the ex-fiancee of a newlywed announces she is expecting a child. Guests Jane Wyatt, Lorna Patterson.
105	8	"Dark Horses"	Bruce Bilson	Story by : Michelle Poteet Lisanti; Teleplay by : Jean Clarke & Michelle Poteet Lisanti	November 28, 1987	106
Chaos breaks out when a presidential candidate (Josh Taylor), who proposed to Christine, is targeted for assassination.
106	9	"Fallen Angel"	Nancy Malone	Bruce Shelly & Reed Shelly	December 5, 1987	098
A 35-year-old romance is reignited; Christine helps a small-town pastor whose husband is pressuring her into TV evangelism.
107	10	"Prized Possessions"	Bruce Bilson	Duane Poole & Tom Swale	December 12, 1987	108
Christine is drawn to a jewel thief who is being pursued by a detective; Peter is entangled with a man who kidnapped his grandchild.
108	11	"Comfort and Joy"	Bruce Bilson	Duane Poole & Tom Swale	December 19, 1987	110
On their journey back to the St. Gregory, Peter and Christine become stuck; Dave and Megan Kendall, who is expecting, return to the hotel for Christmas.
109	12	"Double Take"	James Brolin	Paul Monette & Alfred Sole	January 2, 1988	102
A country singer (Gordon Lightfoot) deals with his alcoholism; Christine befriends a murder witness (Tippi Hedren) who is being hounded by the killer.
110	13	"Till Death Do Us Part"	Gwen Arner	Paul Monette & Alfred Sole	January 9, 1988	111
Christine is mistaken for the "other woman" by an obsessive wife; a woman's fight with Alzheimer's illness impacts both her husband and daughter.
111	14	"Power Play"	Harry Falk	Story by : Rena Down; Teleplay by : Paul & Sharon Boorstin	March 10, 1988	109
Two couples switch partners; Peter McDermott (James Brolin) must choose whether to sell the hotel to Charles Cabot (Efrem Zimbalist Jr).
112	15	"Contest of Wills"	Nancy Malone	Duane Poole & Tom Swale	March 17, 1988	112
A father is approached by the female lover of his deceased daughter; a plumber at the St. Gregory is offered a modeling job.
113	16	"Grand Designs: Part 1"	Richard Kinon	Jean Clarke	April 28, 1988	113
A man tries to rape Julie while they are out on a date; Peter chooses to marry an interior decorator.
114	17	"Aftershocks: Part 2"	Nancy Malone	Story by : Joel J. Feigenbaum; Teleplay by : Joel J. Feigenbaum & Jean Clarke & Duane Poole & Tom Swale	May 5, 1988	114
Three former jurors reexamine their decision to acquit a murderer; Peter's fiancée meddles in hotel operations.

== Reception ==
=== Ratings ===
Season	Season premiere	Season finale	TV season	Season rank	Households (in millions)	Rating
1	September 21, 1983	May 9, 1984	1983–84	9	21.1	—N/a
2	September 26, 1984	May 15, 1985	1984–85	12	19.7	—N/a
3	September 25, 1985	May 21, 1986	1985–86	22	18.3	—N/a
4	October 1, 1986	May 27, 1987	1986–87	38	14.9	—N/a
5	October 3, 1987	May 5, 1988	1987–88	91	8.9	—N/a

== Soundtrack ==
The theme music used for the opening titles was composed by Henry Mancini.

== Home media ==
On July 21, 2009, Paramount Home Entertainment and CBS DVD released Season 1 of Arthur Hailey's Hotel on DVD in Region 1. The episodes are uncut, with most of them clocking in at over 48 minutes, and some coming in at just a shade under that.

On October 20, 2015, Visual Entertainment released Hotel – The Complete Collection on DVD in Region 1 for the first time in a 29-disc box set.

DVD name	Ep #	Release date
The First Season	22	July 21, 2009

On December 6, 2016, VEI re-released the complete series in a condensed, 20-disc edition. The discs were all compiled in a single, jumbo DVD case (the original complete series edition was released with each individual season contained in five individual DVD cases). The box claims the discs to be Region 1 protected but Seasons 1, 2 and 3 are actually region-free.

== Remake ==
In 2003, Aaron Spelling tried to remake the show, twenty years after the original's premiere. The pilot, which starred Michael Jai White and Christina Vidal, was shot for UPN, which passed on the show.
