= Michael Spound =

American actor and writer (born 1957)

- Born: Michael David Spound; April 8, 1957 (age 69); Santa Monica, California, U.S.
- Occupations: Actor; writer; director; teacher
- Years active: 1981–present
- Spouse: Heidi Bohay (m. 1988)
- Children: 3

Michael David Spound (born April 8, 1957) is an American actor and writer.

== Early life ==
Born in Santa Monica, California, in 1957. Parents, Joan and Albert, moved the family (siblings Amy and Jack) to Massachusetts in 1959, settling in Concord. His first acting experiences were with the Concord Players where Spound was in the ensemble of The King and I (1964) and played the role of Billy in King of Hearts (1965). He attended The Fenn School in Concord (1966–1971), Phillips Academy Andover (1971–1975) and graduated Northwestern University after studying Theatre and Film in 1979.

== Career ==
Within six months of arriving in Los Angeles, Spound landed the lead in the Paramount/ABC TV pilot Homeroom opposite Ally Sheedy (1981). In the fall of 1981 he and Dana Olsen wrote the feature film Wacko starring Joe Don Baker, Stella Stevens and Andrew Dice Clay. He guest starred in television series Happy Days, Laverne & Shirley, Family Ties, and Teachers Only in the early '80s. In 1983, he was cast as Dave Kendall in the ABC series Hotel pilot that starred James Brolin, Connie Sellecca and Bette Davis. The pilot was shot at the Fairmont San Francisco Hotel and the series won the favorite drama award at the 10th People's Choice Awards in 1984. Hotel ran for five years (Anne Baxter replaced Bette Davis in the series) and Spound married his co-star and TV wife, Heidi Bohay (Megan Kendall) in 1988.

Spound and Bohay continued to work in television (Hollywood Squares, Pyramid) most notably co-hosting the Emmy-winning syndicated Better Homes and Gardens television series.

Spound has guest starred on over forty different television series including Stitchers, The Last Ship, Hart of Dixie, Criminal Minds, Law & Order: LA, The New Adventures of Old Christine, The West Wing, ER, JAG, NYPD Blue, Matlock, Murder, She Wrote, and has had recurring characters on Star Trek: Voyager, Providence, and Days of Our Lives.

Film credits include Must Love Dogs starring Diane Lane, DreamWorks' The Ring starring Naomi Watts, and the Gary David Goldberg comedy, Bye Bye Love.

On Broadway, Spound originated the role of Rob Stein in Jon Tolins' The Twilight of the Golds at the Booth Theatre in 1993, also doing the National Tour from the Pasadena Playhouse to The Kennedy Center. Off-Broadway and Los Angeles theatre credits include Beau Jest (Laura Patinkin) at The Lamb's Theatre in NYC, the George Furth comedy Sex, Sex, Sex, Sex and Sex at The Matrix Theatre, the LA premiere of the Obie winning A Shayna Maidel at The Tiffany Theatre, and King of Hearts opposite Courteney Cox at The Tiffany Theatre. Spound also originated the role of Jack Waters in Troubled Waters opposite Cynthia Gibb at The Court Theatre in Los Angeles.

== Personal life ==
Spound has been married to his former Hotel co-star Heidi Bohay since 1988 and lives in Los Angeles with their three children. Spound is the co-founder and a teacher at Center Stage Workshop for young actors at the Whitefire Theatre in Sherman Oaks, CA.

== Filmography: Film and Television ==
Film and television
Year	Title	Role	Notes
2016	Stitchers	Vincent Grant	Episode: "Red Eye"
2014	The Last Ship	Colonel Wolken	Episode: "Phase Six"
2013	On the Set W Jasper Cole (TV series)	Himself = Guest	Episode: "Happy Thanksgiving, Hanukkah and World Aids Day"
2012	Hart of Dixie	Cleve Wallace	Episode: "Tributes & Triangles"
2012	Southland	Charlie	Episode: "Community"
2011	Law & Order: LA (TV series)	Dan Garrett	Episode: "Runyon Canyon"
2010	Criminal Minds	Sam DeLilly	Episode: "Remembrance of Things Past"
2010	The Event	Bob Kramer	Episode: "I Haven't Told You Everything"
2010	Rubicon	Anthony Price	
2009	The New Adventures of Old Christine (TV series)	Doug the landlord	Episode: "The Curious Case of Britney B."
2007	Days of Our Lives (TV series)	Dr. Tucker	Episodes: "1.10479, 1.10482, 1.10501, 1.10502, 1.10578, 1.10579"
2006	The West Wing	Vinick's Doctor	Episode: "Two Weeks Out"
2006	Las Vegas	Gary Kravitz	Episode: "And Here's Mike with the Weather"
2005	Must Love Dogs	Marc	
2003	The District	Richard Newman	Episode: "Bloodlines"
2002	ER	Dwayne's Father	Episode: "Hindsight"
2002	The Ring	Dave	
2002	NYPD Blue (TV series)	Frank Mayne	Episode: "Humpty Dumped"
2001	Providence	Mr. Coleman	Episode: "Falling"
2001	Spring Break Lawyer (TV movie)	Hotel Representative	
2001	JAG	Lt. Cmdr. Tim Bryant	Episode: "Collision Course"
2000	Providence	Mr. Coleman	Episode: "Safe at Home"
2000	The Practice	Michael Berenson	Episodes: "Show and Tell", "Summary Judgments"
2000	Strong Medicine (TV series)	Scott	Episode: "Second Look"
2000	Newsbreak	James McNamara	
1999	Pacific Blue	Michael Farraday	Episode: "Thicker Than Water"
1997	L.A. Heat	Andrew Green	Episode: "211 Kidney"
1996	Better Homes and Gardens (TV Series)	Show Host	
1996	Skyscraper (video)	Pollard	
1996	Pacific Blue	Hammerschmidtt	Episode: "The Big Spin"
1996	Star Trek: Voyager (TV series)	Lorrum	Episodes: "Lifesigns", "Dreadnought"
1996	The Single Guy (TV series)	Andy Felner	Episode: "Distance"
1995	Baywatch (TV series)	Billy Foster	Episode: "Surf's Up"
1995	New York Daze (TV series)		Episode: "The Candidate"
1995	Bye Bye Love	Mike	
1994	Heaven Help Us		Episode: "The Badge"
1992	In The Heat of the Night	Tom Murphy	Episode: "An Occupational Hazard"
1992	Davis Rules (TV series)	Chris	Episode: "Ferry Tale"
1989	The New Hollywood Squares (TV series)	Guest Appearance	Episode: "20 March 1989"
1989	Matlock	Father Paul Richards	Episode: "The Priest"
1989	Murder, She Wrote (TV series)	Del Goddard	Episode: "Prediction: Murder"
1988	In the Heat of the Night	Steve Vincent	Episodes: "Blind Spot: Part 1", "Blind Spot: Part 2"
1983–1988	The $25,000 Pyramid (TV series)	Himself – Celebrity Contestant	60 Episodes
1983–1987	Hotel	Dave Kendall	101 Episodes
1985	The Love Boat (TV series)	Ted Belmond	Episodes: "Your Money or Your Wife", "Joint Custody", "The Temptations"
1985	The Love Boat (TV series)	Arnold Devlin	Episodes: "Ace Taces a Holiday", "The Runaway, Courier"
1985	Finder of Lost Loves (TV series)	Ken Grant	Episode: "Final Analysis"
1985	exclusiv (TV series)	Himself	Episodes: "'Hotel' Special"
1985	Battle of the Network Stars XVIII (TV special)	Himself – ABC Team	
1984	The 10th People's Choice Awards (TV special)	Himself – Accepting Award for Favorite New Television Dramatic Program	
1984	The Love Boat (TV series)	Larry Chapman	Episodes: "Ace in the Hole", "Uncle Joey's Song", "Father in the Cradle"
1984	Fantasy Island (TV series)	Alan Curtis	Episodes: "Don Juan's Last Affair", "Final Adieu"
1983	Emergency Room (TV movie)	2nd Fireman	
1983	Family Ties (TV series)	Neil	Episode: "The Fifth Wheel"
1983	Happy Days (TV series)	Jim Walker	Episode: "Prisoner of Love"
1982	Teachers Only (TV series)	Jeremy Stewart	Episode: "I've Got a Crush on You"
1982	Laverne & Shirley (TV series)	Bob	Episode: "Ski Show"
1981	Homeroom (TV short)	Craig Chase	
