= Carson Entertainment =

US television production company

Carson Entertainment Group
- Formerly: Carson Productions; Carson Productions Group
- Company type: Private
- Industry: Television production
- Founded: 1980; 46 years ago
- Founder: Johnny Carson
- Website: www.johnnycarson.com

Carson Entertainment Group (formerly Carson Productions and Carson Productions Group) is a television production company established by Johnny Carson in 1980. The company primarily produced The Tonight Show Starring Johnny Carson from 1980 to 1992 and Late Night with David Letterman from 1982 to 1993.

In addition, Carson Productions also produced many specials with Carson among other TV shows, including Teachers Only from 1982 to 1983, Partners in Crime from 1984 to 1985, Amen from 1986 to 1991 and TV's Bloopers & Practical Jokes (co-produced with Dick Clark Productions) from 1984 to 1993.

It also produced the films The Big Chill (1983) and Desert Bloom (1986).

In the years since Carson's retirement from television (and following his death in 2005), the company's primary function has been to maintain Carson's legacy and license clips (including the sale of commercial DVDs to retail and mail order consumers) of his time hosting The Tonight Show. At the start of 2016, entire episodes were licensed by Carson Entertainment to the digital multicast network Antenna TV for nightly reruns. Johnny Carson's nephew, Jeff Sotzing, currently manages Carson Entertainment Group content.

== History ==
On June 16, 1980, it was announced that former Rastar Television executive John J. McMahon had joined the company, effective June 23. On September 22, 1980, Carson agreed to have 20th Century-Fox Television to handle international distribution of The Tonight Show with Johnny Carson, while Columbia Pictures Television handled the distribution of the rest of the Carson productions.

On March 23, 1981, it was announced that the new four-hour miniseries The Star Maker, which would star Rock Hudson and Suzanne Pleshette, would become the first Carson Productions program to be on the air. On May 4, 1981, it was announced that Lewis & Clark would be the first ever Carson Productions show to go on the air. It would only last one season. This was followed up by a midseason show Cassie & Co., which would star Angie Dickinson, which would eventually also lasted only one season to be on the air.

On March 29, 1982, it was officially announced that NBC had picked up a limited run show Teachers Only, which Carson Productions produced. It experienced high ratings in its first season leading to a renewal a second season; NBC cancelled the show in 1983. In 1983, Carson Productions produced its first feature film The Big Chill as part of a three-picture deal at Columbia Pictures. The film became a critical and commercial success. In 1984, the company began TV's Bloopers & Practical Jokes, co-produced with Dick Clark Productions.

In 1985, John J. McMahon left Carson Productions, and immediately joined United Artists Television. Ed. Weinberger, who was once a successful television producer, working for MTM Enterprises, as well as developing the sitcom The Cosby Show, became the new president of the company. In 1987, the company had attempted to place the entire company up for sale with a minimum bid of $65 million that it was seeking to purchase the company, using the cash flow donated from various shows produced by Carson Productions themselves, and the cash flow for Carson's Comedy Classics paid $4–5 million left in contract, and the buyer was able to make payments on the company.

== See also ==
- Worldwide Pants, a television production company owned by David Letterman
- Conaco, a television production company owned by Conan O’Brien
