= The Tonight Show Starring Johnny Carson =

American late-night talk show

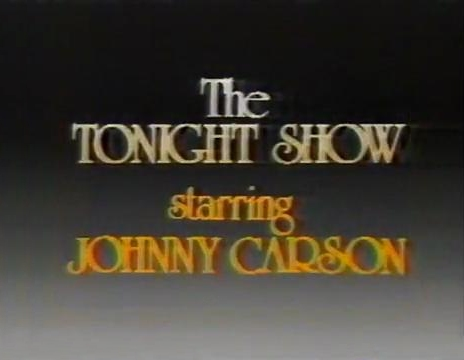
- Also known as: The Tonight Show (franchise brand); Johnny Carson (Antenna TV repeats)
- Genre: Late-night talk/Variety
- Created by: Steve Allen; William O. Harbach; Dwight Hemion; Sylvester L. Weaver Jr.
- Written by: Head writer: Walter Kempley (1963–1967); Hank Bradford (1969–1975); Marshall Brickman (1969–1970); Raymond Siller (1974–1988); Andrew Nicholls and Darrell Vickers (1988–1992)
- Starring: Johnny Carson
- Announcer: Ed McMahon (sidekick)
- Music by: The NBC Orchestra: Band leader: Skitch Henderson (1962–1966); Milton Delugg (1966–1967); Doc Severinsen (1967–1992)
- Opening theme: "Johnny's Theme"
- Composer: Paul Anka
- Country of origin: United States
- Original language: English
- No. of seasons: 30
- No. of episodes: 6,714 (list of episodes)

Production
- Producers: Fred de Cordova; Peter Lassally
- Production locations: Studio 6B, NBC Studios; New York City (1962–1973); Studio 1, NBC Studios, Burbank, California (1972–1992)
- Camera setup: Multi-camera
- Running time: 47–105 minutes

Original release
- Network: NBC
- Release: October 1, 1962 – May 22, 1992

Related
- Carson's Comedy Classics

The Tonight Show Starring Johnny Carson is an American television talk show broadcast by NBC. The show was the third installment of The Tonight Show. Hosted by Johnny Carson, it aired from October 1, 1962, to May 22, 1992, replacing Tonight Starring Jack Paar and was replaced by The Tonight Show with Jay Leno. Ed McMahon served as Carson's sidekick and the show's announcer.

For its first decade, Johnny Carson's The Tonight Show was based at the RCA Building at 30 Rockefeller Plaza, New York City, with some episodes recorded at NBC Studios in Burbank, California; on May 1, 1972, the show moved to Burbank as its main venue with extended returns to New York for several weeks over the next 12 months. After May 1973, however, the show remained in Burbank exclusively until Carson's retirement. The show's house band, the NBC Orchestra, was led by Skitch Henderson, until 1966 when Milton Delugg took over, who was succeeded by Doc Severinsen less than a year later.

Carson's Tonight Show was the longest-running late-night show of all time. The show played a significant role in launching the careers of numerous comedians by introducing them to a national audience. The series was ranked as one of the greatest TV shows of all time in polls from 2002 and 2013.

== Format ==
Johnny Carson's Tonight Show established the modern format of the late-night talk show: a monologue sprinkled with a rapid-fire series of 16 to 22 one-liners (Carson had a rule of no more than three on the same subject) was sometimes followed by sketch comedy, then moving on to guest interviews and performances by musicians and stand-up comedians, in no fixed order. Occasionally, Carson interviewed prominent politicians such as Richard Nixon, Ronald Reagan, Bill Clinton, Robert F. Kennedy, and Hubert Humphrey, however Carson refused to discuss his personal political views on the show out of concern it might alienate his audience and resisted efforts from his writing staff, particularly head writer and admitted liberal Marshall Brickman, to include more political material in the show. Other regulars were selected for their entertainment or information value, in contrast to those who offered more cerebral conversation. Musical guests were chosen under the premise that viewers watching a show in the middle of the night would not appreciate raucous rock and roll or funk performances at a time most people were trying to sleep, and tended to favor musicians with a lighter or more traditional sound.

His preference for access to Hollywood stars caused the show's move to the West Coast on May 1, 1972. However, the show would continue to have episodes taped in New York until 1973 when production moved to Hollywood permanently. The Tonight Show would not return to New York until 2014 when Jimmy Fallon took the hosting reins. When asked about intellectual conversation on The Tonight Show, Carson and his staff invariably cited "Carl Sagan, Paul Ehrlich, Margaret Mead, Gore Vidal, Shana Alexander, Madalyn Murray O'Hair" as guests; one television critic stated, however, "he always presented them as if they were spinach for your diet when he did [feature such names]." Family therapist Carlfred Broderick appeared on the show ten times, and psychologist Joyce Brothers was one of Carson's most frequent guests. Carson, in general, did not feature prop comedy acts (Carson was not averse to using prop comedy himself); such acts, with Gallagher being a prominent example, more commonly appeared when guest hosts helmed the program.

Carson almost never socialized with guests before or after the show; frequent interviewee Orson Welles recalled that Tonight Show employees were astonished when Carson visited Welles's dressing room to say hello before a show. In contrast to the avuncular mien (Merv Griffin, Mike Douglas) and loquacious erudition (Dick Cavett) evinced by his contemporaries, Carson was a comparatively "cool" host who only laughed when genuinely amused; additionally, it was not uncommon for him to abruptly cut short monotonous or embarrassingly inept interviewees. Mort Sahl recalled, "The producer crouches just off camera and holds up a card that says, 'Go to commercial.' So Carson goes to a commercial and the whole team rushes up to his desk to discuss what had gone wrong, like a pit stop at Le Mans." Actor Robert Blake once compared being interviewed by Carson to "facing the death squad" or "Broadway on opening night." Guests who told jokes that offended Carson or disrupted the show risked being blackballed and never being invited back unless a guest was hosting; Kevin Nealon and Howie Mandel both recalled jokes that went awry and had led to them never appearing on Carson-hosted episodes again. The publicity value of appearing on The Tonight Show was so great, however, that most guests were willing to subject themselves to the risk.

== Show regulars ==
=== Ed McMahon ===
The series' announcer and Carson's sidekick was Ed McMahon, who from the first show would introduce Carson with a drawn-out "Here's Johnny!" (something McMahon was inspired to do by the overemphasized way he had introduced reporter Robert Pierpoint on the NBC Radio Network program Monitor). The catchphrase was heard nightly for 30 years, and ranked top of the TV Land poll of American TV catchphrases and quotes in 2006; it has been referenced in lots of media going from The Shining to Johnny Bravo to a "Weird Al" Yankovic album cut; it was even used for the character Johnny Cage in the video game series Mortal Kombat.

McMahon, who held the same role in Carson's ABC game show Who Do You Trust? for five years previously, would remain standing to the side as Carson did his monologue, laughing (sometimes obsequiously) at his jokes, then join him at the guest chair when Carson moved to his desk. The two would usually interact in a comic spot for a short while before the first guest was introduced.

McMahon stated in a 1978 profile of Carson in The New Yorker that "the 'Tonight Show' is my staple diet, my meat and potatoes—I'm realistic enough to know that everything else stems from that." After a 1965 incident in which he ruined Carson's joke on the air, McMahon was careful to, as he said, "never to go where [Carson]'s going." He wrote in his 1998 autobiography:

My role on the show never was strictly defined. I did what had to be done when it had to be done. I was there when he needed me, and when he didn't I moved down the couch and kept quiet. ... I did the audience warm-up, I did commercials, for a brief period I co-hosted the first fifteen minutes of the show..., and I performed in many sketches. On our thirteenth-anniversary show Johnny and I were talking at his desk and he said, "Thirteen years is a long time." He paused long enough for me to recognize my cue, so I asked, "How long is it?" "That's why you're here," he said, probably summing up my primary role on the show perfectly... I had to support him, I had to help him get to the punch line, but while doing it I had to make it look as if I wasn't doing anything at all. The better I did it, the less it appeared as if I was doing it....If I was going to play second fiddle, I wanted to be the Heifetz of second fiddlers....The most difficult thing for me to learn how to do was just sit there with my mouth closed. Many nights I'd be listening to Johnny and in my mind I'd reach the same ad lib just as he said it. I'd have to bite my tongue not to say it out loud. I had to make sure I wasn't too funny—although critics who saw some of my other performances will claim I needn't have worried. If I got too many laughs, I wasn't doing my job; my job was to be part of a team that generated the laughs.

=== Bandleaders and others ===
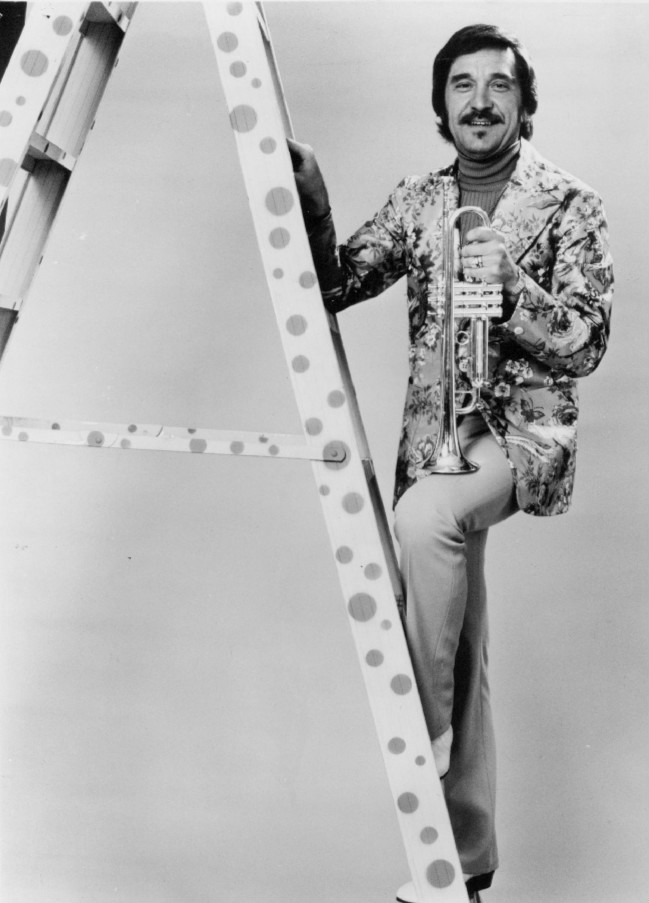
Doc Severinsen led the NBC Orchestra beginning in 1967; he held the role until the show's finale

The Tonight Show had a live big band for nearly all of its existence. The NBC Orchestra during Carson's reign was originally led by Skitch Henderson (who had previously led the band during Tonight Starring Steve Allen), followed briefly by Milton DeLugg. Starting in 1967 and continuing until Jay Leno took over, the band was led by Doc Severinsen, with Tommy Newsom filling in for him when he was absent or filling in for McMahon as the announcer (this usually happened when a guest host substituted for Carson, which generally gave McMahon the night off as well). The series' instrumental theme music, "Johnny's Theme", was a re-arrangement of the Paul Anka composition "Toot Sweet", which Anka and Annette Funicello had separately recorded, with lyrics, as "It's Really Love". During shows when Newsom filled in for Severinsen, the band played a slightly truncated version of the theme that transitioned from the bridge to the closing phrase without reprising the first few notes of the main melody. The NBC Orchestra was the last in-house studio orchestra to perform on American television.

Behind the scenes, motion picture director/producer Fred de Cordova joined The Tonight Show in 1970 as producer, graduating to executive producer in 1984. Unlike many people of his position, de Cordova often appeared on the show, bantering with Carson from his chair off-camera (though occasionally a camera would be pointed in his direction).

Dick Cavett was Carson's original head writer. He was succeeded by Marshall Brickman when Cavett left to pursue a stand-up career in 1964. The Tonight Show writing staff was structured so that the head writer was responsible for all of the material except for the nightly monologues, which the remainder of the staff handled; Brickman remarked in a 2009 interview that this was the main reason why he, at 25, got his position without any major experience, since all of the other writers under Cavett declined the offer. Brickman was succeeded as head writer by Hank Bradford, a writer and stand-up comedian who had performed his routine on the show multiple times in the 1960s, and who led The Tonight Show writing staff from 1970 to 1975. Pat McCormick carried over from Paar's hosting run and contributed both to the writing of jokes and with on-screen appearances.

== Recurring segments and skits ==
=== Characters ===
Carson as Carnac the Magnificent, a reoccurring comedic role he introduced in 1964.

- Carnac the Magnificent, in which Carson played a psychic who clairvoyantly divined the answer to a question contained in a sealed envelope. This was to some degree a variation on Steve Allen's recurring "The Question Man" sketch. The answer was always an outrageous pun. "Carnac" examples:
  - "Debate" ... "What do you use to catch de fish?"
  - "Baja" ... "What sound does a sheep make when it laughs?"
  - "Ben-Gay" ... "Why didn't Mrs. Franklin have any kids?"
  - "A loaf of bread, a jug of wine, and thou" ... "Name three things that have yeast."
  - "Three Dog Night" ... "What's a bad night for a tree?"
  - "Mount Baldy" ... "What did Yul Brynner's wife do on their wedding night?" also "How do you play 'horsey' with Don Rickles?"
  - "Sis boom bah" ... "Describe the sound made when a sheep explodes." (Ed McMahon's personal favorite)

If the laughter fell short when a line bombed (as it often did), "Carnac" would face the audience with mock seriousness and bestow a comic curse: "May a diseased yak befriend your sister!" or "May a rabid holy man bless your nether regions with a power tool!"

- "Floyd R. Turbo," a dimwitted yokel responding to a TV station editorial. Floyd always spoke haltingly, as though reading from cue cards, and railed against some newsworthy topic, like Secretaries' Day: "This raises the question: Kiss my Dictaphone!"
- "Art Fern," the fast-talking host of a "Tea Time Movie" program, who advertised inane products, assisted by the attractive Matinee Lady, played by Paula Prentiss (late 1960s), Carol Wayne (the most familiar Matinee Lady, 1971–81, 1984), Danuta Wesley (1982), and Teresa Ganzel (1984–92). He imitated the vocal stylings of Jackie Gleason's character "Reginald Van Gleason". The fake movies Art would introduce usually had eclectic casts ("Ben Blue, Red Buttons, Jesse White, and Karen Black") and nonsensical titles ("Rin-Tin-Tin Gets Fixed Fixed Fixed"). This would be followed by a four-second stock film clip before coming back for another commercial, usually catching Art and the Matinee Lady in a very compromising position. On giving directions to a fake store he was touting, Fern would show a spaghetti-like road map, sometimes with a literal "fork in the road," other times making the joke, "Go to the Slauson Cutoff...," and the audience would recite with him, "...cut off your Slauson!" The character was previously named "Honest Bernie Schlock" and then "Ralph Willie" when the Tea Time sketches first aired in the mid-to-late 1960s. At least one surviving pre-1972 Art Fern sketch that originated from New York had its movie show title as "The Big Flick," an amalgam of two movie show titles in use at the time by New York station WOR-TV, The Big Preview and The Flick. On that sketch Lee Meredith was the Matinee Lady. Carson's Comedy Classics features an episode where Juliet Prowse is in the role of Matinee Lady, from 20 August 1971.
- "Aunt Blabby," an old woman whose appearance and speech pattern bore more than a passing resemblance to comedian Jonathan Winters' character "Maude Frickert." A frequent theme would be McMahon happening to mention a word or phrase that could suggest death, as in "What tourist attractions did you check out?," to which Aunt Blabby would respond, "Never say check out to an old person!"
- "El Mouldo," mysterious mentalist. He would announce some mind-over-matter feat and always fail, although triumphantly shouting "El Mouldo has done it again!" Ed McMahon would take exception, noting El Mouldo's failure. "Did I fail before?" asked El Mouldo. "Yes!," replied McMahon, to which El Mouldo said, "Well, I've done it again!" El Mouldo was in large part a continuation of Carson's mentalist character Dillinger, which he had performed on The Johnny Carson Show in 1955 on CBS; Dillinger was an obvious spoof of Dunninger, leading to complaints and threats of lawsuits against Carson and CBS.
- "David Howitzer, Consumer Supporter," a thinly veiled satire of consumer reporter David Horowitz. Howitzer's segments (in a rare example of prop comedy for the show) usually featured purported counterfeit consumer goods (usually gag props) that unscrupulous mail-order companies had sent his unsuspecting viewers (for example, a woman who spent thousands of dollars on an oriental rug instead received a cheap toupee made in Taiwan).
- "Ronald Reagan." During President Reagan's term in office, Carson developed an impersonation of the president that was featured regularly in a Mighty Carson Art Players segment. Carson also did a less memorable impersonation of Jimmy Carter during his term as president.

=== Bits ===
Some bits are desk pieces, others are stand-ups, however the multiperson sketches are collectively referred to as by The Mighty Carson Art Players, with sketch series that include Tea Time Movie with Art Fern, and Home Shopping Network(?) with Sheila McShallow.

- "The Mighty Carson Art Players," began in 1966. The name was a tribute to radio legend Fred Allen's Mighty Allen Art Players. While Carson's show was primarily a talk show, with performances by guests, periodically Carson, "playing on top of a character", and a group of stock performers, including Betty White, blonde Teresa Ganzel, curvaceous Suzanne LaRusch (from a modeling agency), buxom Carol Wayne, Fred Holliday, Norm Alden, Peter Leeds, and Jimmy Devine, would perform skits that spoofed news, movies, television shows, commercials, and past events. A Mighty Carson Art Players appearance would usually be announced along with that night's guests during McMahon's introduction.

Example: Johnny, dressed as a doctor, starting to talk about some intimate topic (just as in the real ad) and then being hit by cream pies from several directions at once.

"the secret to getting a sketch approved by Carson was "B.I.B."..."Babe In Bikini" or maybe "Bimbo in Bikini"...if the sketch was really weak, you might need more than one" — Nick Arnold (Nicholas Arnold Melito, 1 March 1947 — 28 September 1999)

- "The Edge of Wetness," in which Johnny would read humorous plot summaries of a fictional soap opera (such as The Edge of Night) while the camera randomly chose an unsuspecting audience member whom Carson claimed was, for example, the butler from the soap.
- "Book bit" (named retrospectively, with a "fun fact" list read, from a book or news article, followed by a similar comedic "supposed fact" list, later revived as "Fun Facts" by David Letterman and by Bill Maher)
- "How ___ was it?" a recurring call-and-response during Carson's monologues. Carson would set up the joke with a passing comment about, for instance, the weather with the phrase "It was so hot..." prompting the audience to respond "HOW HOT WAS IT?" Carson would then follow with several punch lines (e.g. "I heard Burger King singing, 'If you want it made your way, cook it yourself!'"). Carson would occasionally throw the audience off with an anti-joke (such as "it was worth the trip in, wasn't it?").
- "Stump the Band," where studio audience members ask the band to try to play obscure songs given only the title. Unlike when this routine was done during the Jack Paar years with the José Melis band, Severinsen's band almost never knew the song, but that did not stop them from inventing one on the spot. Example:

Guest's request: "My Dead Dog Rover"
Doc Severinsen, singing: "My dead dog Rover / lay under the sun / and stayed there all summer / until he was done!"
David Letterman revived this bit later, along with the CBS Orchestra on his Late Show

- "Moron Movies", absurdist extra-short films by Len Cella, were regularly featured on The Tonight Show from 1983 to 1985.
- "Headlines," was developed by Jay Leno, and seen only during nights when he guest-hosted beginning in 1986, featured humorous stories and typos from newspaper clippings. This carried over when Leno became permanent host in 1992.

== Programming history ==
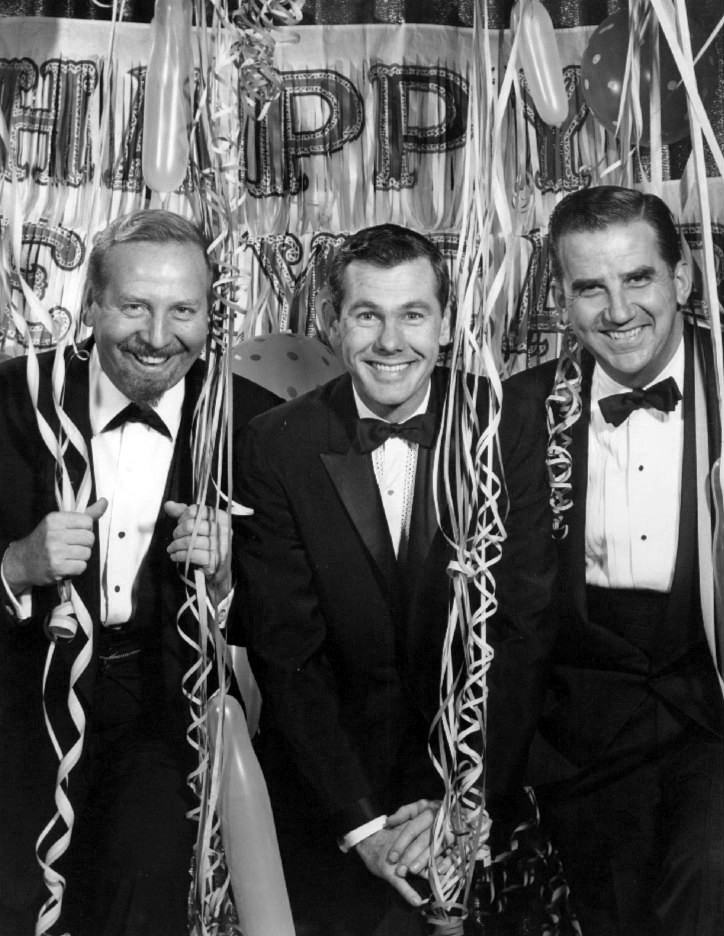
Carson's first Tonight Show on New Year's Eve, 1962; shown with Skitch Henderson and Ed McMahon

Jack Paar's last appearance was on March 29, 1962, and due to Carson's commitment to the ABC game show Who Do You Trust?, he could not take over until October 1 (the day his ABC contract expired). His first guests were Rudy Vallée, Tony Bennett, Mel Brooks, and Joan Crawford. Carson inherited from Paar a show that was 1 3/4 hours (105 minutes) long. The show broadcast two openings, one starting at 11:15 p.m. and including the monologue, the other that listed the guests and re-announced the host, starting at 11:30 p.m. The two openings gave affiliates the option of screening either a fifteen-minute or thirty-minute local newscast preceding Carson. Since 1959, the show had been videotaped earlier the same broadcast day.

As more affiliates introduced thirty minutes of local news, Carson's monologue was being seen by fewer people. To rectify this situation, Ed McMahon and Skitch Henderson co-hosted the first fifteen minutes of the show between February 1965 and December 1966 without Carson, who then took over at 11:30. Finally, because he wanted the show to start when he came on, at the beginning of January 1967 Carson insisted the 11:15 segment be eliminated (which, he claimed in a monologue at the time, "no one actually watched except the Armed Forces and four Navajos in Gallup, New Mexico").

- January 2, 1967 – September 12, 1980: Monday–Friday 11:30 p.m.–1:00 a.m.
- January 1965 – September 1966: Saturday or Sunday 11:15 p.m.–1:00 a.m. (reruns, initially billed as The Saturday Tonight Show)
- September 1966 – September 1975: Saturday or Sunday 11:30 p.m.–1:00 a.m. (reruns, now identified as The Saturday/Sunday Tonight Show; The Weekend Tonight Show by 1973)

By the mid-1970s Tonight was the most profitable show on television, making NBC $50 to $60 million each year. Carson influenced the scheduling of reruns (which typically aired under the title The Best of Carson) in the mid-1970s and, in 1980, the length of each evening's broadcast, by threatening NBC with, in the first case, moving to another network, and in the latter, retiring altogether.

In order to work fewer days each week, Carson began to petition network executives in 1974 that reruns on the weekends be discontinued, in favor of showing them on one or more nights during the week. In response to his demands, NBC created a new comedy/variety series to feed to affiliates on Saturday nights that debuted in October 1975, Saturday Night Live.

In 1980, Carson renewed his contract with the stipulation that the show lose its last half-hour. On the last 90-minute show (September 12, 1980), Carson explained that by going to an hour, the show would feel more fast-paced, and have a greater selection of guests.

For a year, Tom Snyder's existing talk show, Tomorrow, was expanded to 90 minutes and forced to change its format, adding gossip reporter Rona Barrett as a co-host and taking on the name Tomorrow Coast to Coast. This was short-lived as a year and a half later, Snyder had quit and Tomorrow Coast to Coast had been canceled. Carson was given authority to fill the vacant time slot and used it to create Late Night with David Letterman (1982–1993). Today, The Tonight Show remains one hour in length and is still followed by Late Night, currently under the title Late Night with Seth Meyers (2014–).

- September 15, 1980 – August 30, 1991: Monday–Friday 11:30 p.m.–12:30 a.m.
- September 2, 1991 – May 22, 1992: Monday–Friday 11:35 p.m.–12:35 a.m.

In May 1991, following positive viewer reception during tests in St. Louis (KSDK) and Dallas–Fort Worth (KXAS), NBC reached an agreement with Carson Productions to delay the show's start time by five minutes beginning September 2, allowing its stations to include more commercials during their local newscasts. (The timeshift would also affect Late Night, Later with Bob Costas, and station-programmed overnight syndicated shows.) NBC executives had been proposing the five-minute delay idea to Carson since 1988, only to be repeatedly rebuffed, amid concerns that some of its affiliates—particularly those that had unsuccessfully sought permission to delay the Tonight Show by a half-hour—would begin preempting the program entirely and replace it with syndicated reruns to generate extra revenue from local advertising.

In an onscreen eulogy to Carson in 2005, David Letterman said that every talk show host owes his livelihood to Johnny Carson during his Tonight Show run.

=== 1979–1980 contract battle ===
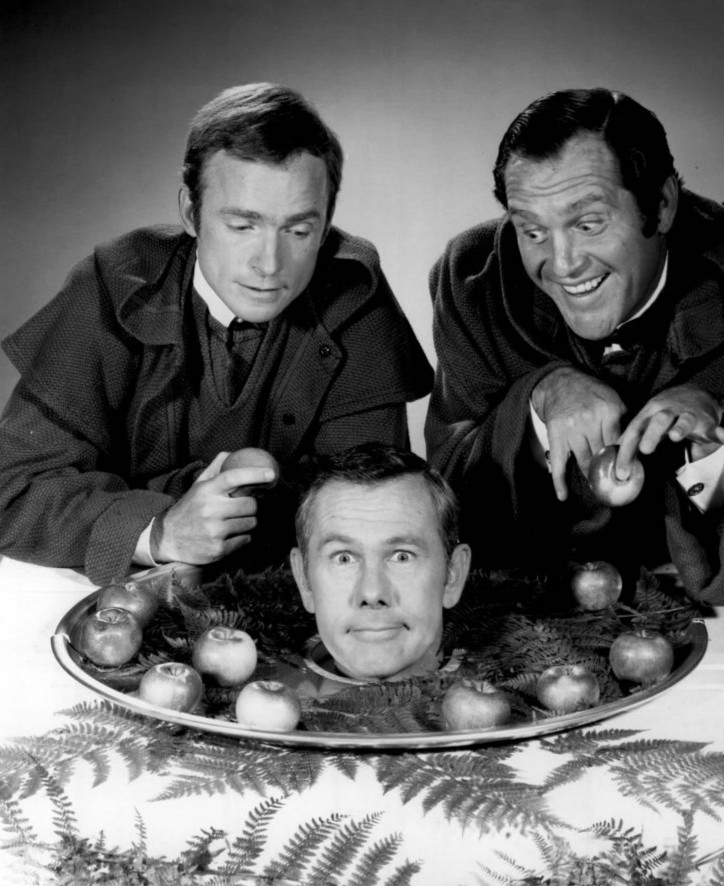
With Dick Cavett and Alan King

In 1979, when Fred Silverman was the head of NBC, Carson took the network to court, claiming that he had been a free agent since April of that year because his most recent contract had been signed in 1972. Carson cited a California law barring certain contracts from lasting more than seven years. NBC claimed that it had signed three agreements since then and Carson was bound to the network until April 1981. While the case was settled out of court, the friction between Carson and the network remained and Carson was actively courted by rival network ABC, which was willing to double Carson's salary and offer him a lighter work schedule and ownership of the show. NBC, in turn, was ready to offer The Tonight Show to Carson's most frequent guest host at the time, Richard Dawson.

Eventually, Carson reached an agreement that paid $25 million a year while reducing his workload from 90 to 60 minutes, with new shows airing only three nights a week 37 weeks a year (a guest host would appear Monday nights and for most of Carson's 15 weeks of vacation and "Best of Carson" reruns would air Tuesdays) and also give him ownership of the show, as well as its back catalog, and of the time slot following the Tonight Show which became Late Night with David Letterman produced by Carson Productions. In September 1980, Carson's eponymous production company gained ownership of the show after owning it from 1969 to the early 1970s.

=== Archives ===
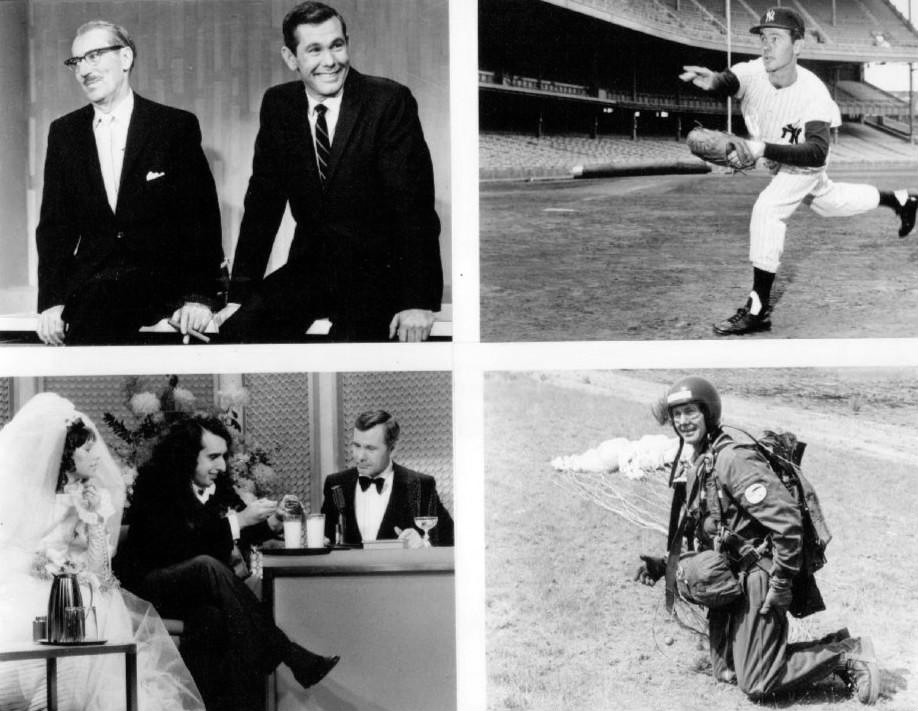
Some memorable moments. Top left: Carson's first show with Groucho, 1962. Top right: Carson practices pitching at Yankee Stadium, 1962. Bottom left: Tiny Tim's wedding, 1969. Bottom right: Carson does a skydiving demonstration, 1968.

Only 33 complete episodes of Johnny Carson's Tonight Show that had originally aired prior to May 1, 1972, are known to exist. All other shows during this period, including Carson's debut as host, are now considered lost. Carson himself initially encouraged the erasure of his archives thinking that the shows were of no real value and that NBC should "make guitar picks" out of them. Carson's shows were preserved by NBC into the early 1970s, but then thrown out to free storage space after the show moved to Burbank, California. When Carson later learned of their destruction, he was furious.

Other surviving material from the era has been found on kinescopes held in the archives of the Armed Forces Radio and Television Service, or in the personal collections of guests of the program, while a few moments such as Tiny Tim's wedding, were preserved. New York meteorologist Dr. Frank Field, an occasional guest during the years he was weather forecaster for WNBC-TV, showed several clips of his appearances with Carson in a 2002 career retrospective on WWOR-TV; Field had maintained the clips in his own personal archives. There are also two appearances by Judy Garland in 1968 that still survive. John Lennon and Paul McCartney's joint appearance on the May 14, 1968 episode guest-hosted by Joe Garagiola, with a guest appearance by Tallulah Bankhead (one of her last), was preserved on poor-quality home kinescope and audiotape in separate recordings by Beatles fans. Similarly, the Supremes' May 22, 1967 appearance survives on poor-quality kinescope and an audio recording of their April 5, 1968 appearance honoring the recently slain Martin Luther King Jr. was preserved.

The program archive is virtually complete from 1973 to 1992. Carson Productions has also made clips available on YouTube and Antenna TV.

Although no footage is known to remain of Carson's first broadcast as host of The Tonight Show on October 1, 1962, photographs taken that night survive, including Carson being introduced by Groucho Marx, as does an audio recording of Marx's introduction and Carson's first monologue. One of his first jokes upon starting the show (after receiving a few words of encouragement from Marx, one of which was, "Don't go to Hollywood!") was to pretend to panic and say, "I want my nana!" (This recording was played at the start of Carson's final broadcast on May 22, 1992). The oldest surviving video recording of the show is dated November 1962, while the oldest surviving color recording is from April 1964, when Carson interviewed Jake Ehrlich Sr. as his guest.

The 30-minute audio recordings of many of the "missing" episodes are contained in the Library of Congress in the Armed Forces Radio collection. Many 1970s-era episodes have been licensed to distributors that advertise mail-order offers on late-night TV. The later shows that exist in full were stored by Carson in a bomb-proof underground salt mine outside Hutchinson, Kansas.

The non-tape archives pertaining to Carson's show are held by the Elkhorn Valley Museum in Carson's hometown of Norfolk, Nebraska. Beginning in 2020, the museum began working with the National Comedy Center to preserve the archive.

=== Rebroadcasts and streaming availability ===
A large amount of material from Carson's first two decades of The Tonight Show (1962–1982), much of it not seen since it had first aired, appeared in a half hour "clip/compilation" syndicated program known as Carson's Comedy Classics that aired in 1983. Audio clips from the show were featured nightly on WHO-AM in Des Moines, Iowa, in the mid-2000s. In 2014, Turner Classic Movies would begin rerunning select interviews from the program for a new series called "Carson on TCM" presented by Conan O'Brien, who himself hosted The Tonight Show briefly.

The digital multicast network Antenna TV acquired rerun rights to whole episodes of the series in August 2015. Unlike the previous clip shows, Antenna TV's airings feature full broadcasts as they were originally seen, with the only edits being removal of The Tonight Show name, with the show being renamed simply as Johnny Carson (as of January 2018, the broadcasts air opposite the current edition of The Tonight Show in much of the United States, and NBC still owns the trademark on that name), and with bumpers, walk-on music and the closing theme being replaced by generic music cues from the Warner/Chappell Production Music library. Most musical guest segments are also removed as are episodes with guest hosts. Antenna TV began airing the show seven days a week beginning January 1, 2016. Currently, the show airs Mondays-Saturdays at 11:00pm EST, with the 60-minute episodes (from September 15, 1980 – May 1992) air Monday through Friday nights, and 90-minute episodes (from 1972 – September 12, 1980) on Saturday nights.

Selected episodes of Carson's show are available on NBC's Peacock streaming service. Shout! Factory launched a 24/7 streaming channel devoted to the series in August 2020, which is distributed through various free over-the-top platforms, including Stirr, Xumo and Pluto TV. Recently, The Roku Channel began streaming JohnnyCarsonTV on its multi-channel platform LiveTV.

== Guest hosts ==
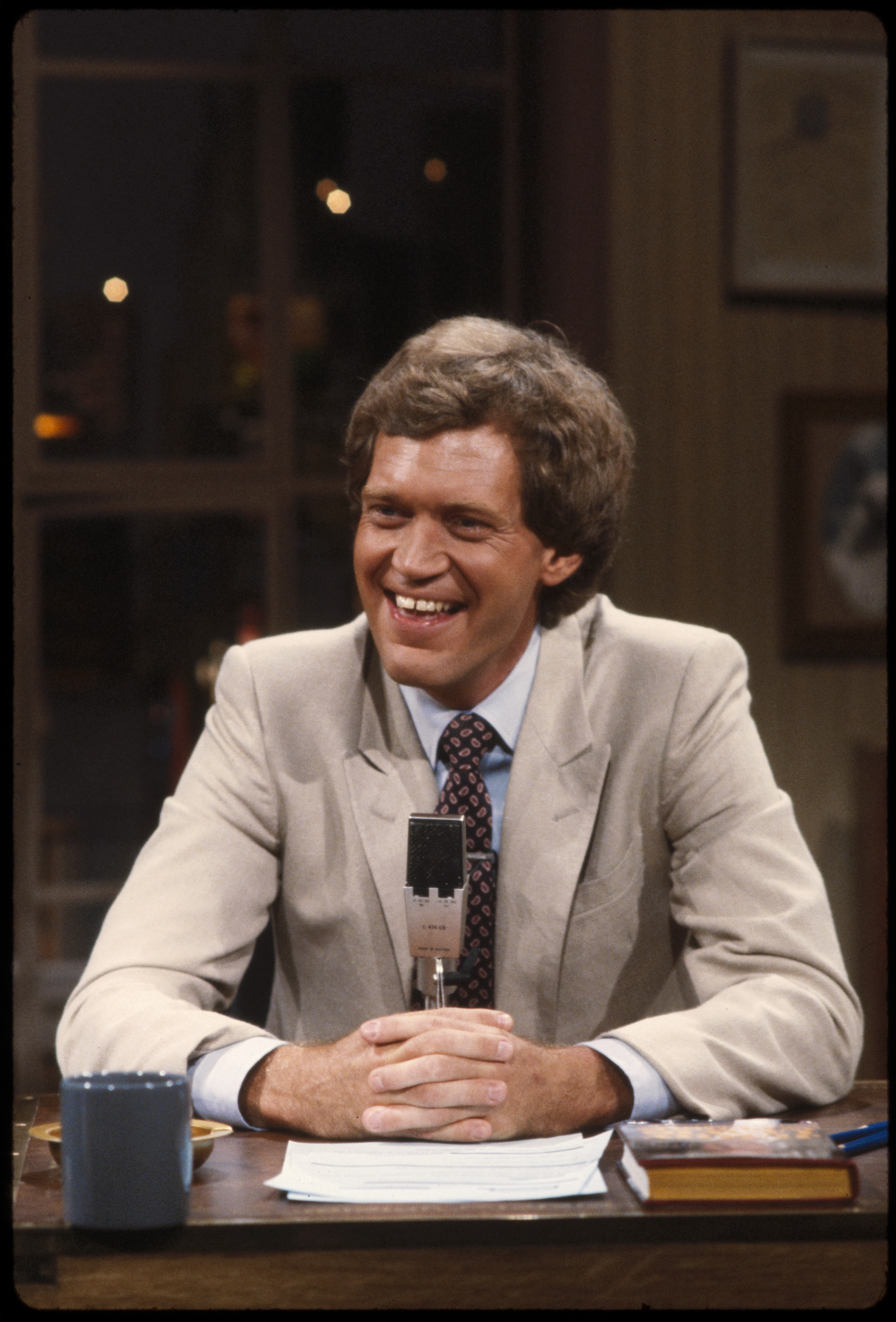
David Letterman guest-hosted the program 51 times before starting his own NBC talk show in 1982

Jack Paar had often asked Carson to guest-host Tonight in its earliest years and repeatedly claimed he had been responsible for NBC's selection of Carson in 1962 as his replacement. Steve Allen also utilized guest hosts, including Carson and Ernie Kovacs, particularly after he began hosting The Steve Allen Show in prime time in 1956 and needed to reduce his workload on Tonight.

The Tonight Show Starring Johnny Carson had guest hosts for entire weeks during Carson's vacations and other nights he had off. Many guest hosts were already large names in their own right, among them Frank Sinatra, Burt Reynolds, Don Rickles, Tony Danza, and Steve Martin. Comedian Woody Allen guest hosted three times between 1966 and 1971. On May 29, 1970, Della Reese became the first African-American woman to guest host the show. The following is a list of those who guest-hosted at least 50 times:

- Jay Leno (333 times, from 1986 to 1992)
- Joan Rivers (201, between 1969 and 1986)
- Joey Bishop (177, mostly in the 1960s, early 1970s)
- John Davidson (87, mostly in the late 1970s and early 1980s)
- Bob Newhart (87, mostly in the 1960s and 1970s)
- David Brenner (70, from 1975 to 1985)
- McLean Stevenson (58, mostly in the late 1970s)
- Jerry Lewis (52, mostly in the 1960s to mid-1970s)
- David Letterman (51, mostly during 1980 and 1981)

Impressionist Rich Little guest hosted 12 times during the 1970s and early 1980s.

Sammy Davis Jr. guest hosted on November 23, 1964, becoming the first African-American to host a talk show, and then guest hosted for a week in August 1966. Harry Belafonte guest hosted for a week in February 1968, and among Belafonte's guests were Robert F. Kennedy and Martin Luther King Jr., just months before both men were assassinated (King in April; Kennedy in June). On April 2, 1979, Kermit the Frog was guest host. In addition, many other Muppets appeared for skits and regular segments: Frank Oz voiced Fozzie Bear and Animal, while Jerry Nelson performed Uncle Deadly, a Vincent Price-inspired Muppet during a segment with the real Price. Richard Dawson guest hosted 14 times during 1979 and 1980, and was being considered as a full-time replacement should Carson have retired during his 1980 contract dispute with NBC.

Carson's contract, that took effect in 1980, reduced his work schedule to three nights a week, 37 weeks a year. "Best of Carson" reruns aired on Tuesdays in the weeks that Carson was hosting new shows. Monday night shows and shows for most of the 15 weeks that Carson had off were hosted by guest hosts. Due to the frequent need for substitutes, starting in 1983 permanent guest hosts were hired in order to give the program more stability. The permanent guest hosts were Joan Rivers (1983–1986), then, after about a year where a wide range of guest hosts were used, Garry Shandling alternating with Jay Leno (1987–1988). Shandling, who guest-hosted 37 times, left to focus on his Showtime series It's Garry Shandling's Show. This left Leno alone as the sole permanent guest host from August 1988 on. Leno first guest hosted in 1986, and would do so 333 times before becoming the next Tonight Show host in 1992. Though the concept of using "permanent" guest hosts was fairly strictly adhered to, occasionally illness or some other situation necessitated a substitute guest host, as when David Brenner filled in for Joan Rivers on October 31 and November 1, 1985, when Rivers' husband was briefly hospitalized.

=== Joan Rivers ===
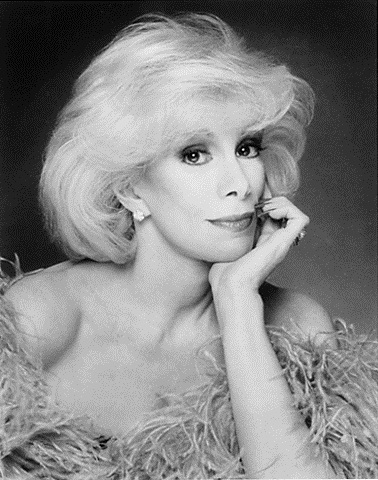
Former guest host Joan Rivers left the program in 1986 for her own show on Fox

In September 1983, Joan Rivers was designated Carson's permanent guest host, a role she had been essentially filling for the previous year. In 1986, after years as a guest and 190 total appearances as guest host, she left the program for her own show on the then-new Fox Network. According to Carson, Rivers never personally informed him of the existence of her show. Rivers, on the other hand, disagreed. Nevertheless, Rivers' new show was quickly canceled, and she never again appeared on The Tonight Show with Carson. Nor did she appear on The Tonight Show with Jay Leno, a ban maintained by Leno out of respect for Carson. She also never appeared during Conan O'Brien's seven-month run. After Carson's death in 2005, Rivers told CNN that Carson never forgave her for leaving, and never spoke to her again, even after she wrote him a note following the accidental death of Carson's son Ricky in June 1991. On February 17, 2014, Rivers returned to the Tonight Show as part of a skit in which numerous celebrities paid new host Jimmy Fallon, after having lost the bet that he would never become the host of the program. Rivers appeared for a full-length interview segment on March 27, 2014.

The program of July 26, 1984, with guest host Joan Rivers, was the first MTS stereo broadcast in American television history, though not the first television broadcast with stereophonic sound. Only NBC's flagship local station in New York City, WNBC, had stereo broadcast capability at that time. NBC transmitted The Tonight Show in stereo sporadically through 1984 and on a regular basis beginning in 1985.

== Consequential appearances ==
According to Skepticism activist James Randi, Carson invited Uri Geller, who claimed paranormal powers, onto the Tonight Show specifically to disprove the Israeli performer's claims. Randi later wrote, "that Johnny had been a magician himself", so prior to the date of taping, Randi was asked "to help prevent any trickery." Per Randi's advice, the show prepared their own props without informing Geller, and did not let Geller or his staff "anywhere near them." When Geller joined Carson on stage, he appeared surprised that he was not going to be interviewed, but instead was expected to display his abilities using the provided articles. Geller said "This scares me." and "I'm surprised because before this program your producer came and he read me at least 40 questions you were going to ask me." Geller was unable to display any paranormal abilities, saying "I don't feel strong" and he expressed his displeasure at feeling like he was being "pressed" to perform by Carson. According to Adam Higginbotham's Nov. 7, 2014 article in the New York Times:

The result was a legendary immolation, in which Geller offered up flustered excuses to his host as his abilities failed him again and again. "I sat there for 22 minutes, humiliated," Geller told me, when I spoke to him in September. "I went back to my hotel, devastated. I was about to pack up the next day and go back to Tel Aviv. I thought, That's it — I'm destroyed."

However, this appearance on The Tonight Show, which Carson and Randi had orchestrated to debunk Geller's claimed abilities, backfired. According to Higginbotham,

To Geller's astonishment, he was immediately booked on The Merv Griffin Show. He was on his way to becoming a paranormal superstar. "That Johnny Carson show made Uri Geller," Geller said. To an enthusiastically trusting public, his failure only made his gifts seem more real: If he were performing magic tricks, they would surely work every time.

== Carson's last shows ==
As his retirement approached, Carson tried to avoid sentimentality but would periodically show clips of some of his favorite moments and again invited some of his favorite guests. He told his crew, "Everything comes to an end; nothing lasts forever. Thirty years is enough. It's time to get out while you're still working on top of your game, while you're still working well."

Carson hosted his penultimate show, featuring guests Robin Williams and Bette Midler, on May 21, 1992. The last of Carson's monologues was delivered on this episode and was written by Jim Mulholland, Steven Kunes and Rift Fournier. Once underway, the atmosphere was electric and Carson was greeted with a sustained, two-minute intense standing ovation. Williams was especially uninhibited with his trademark manic energy and stream-of-consciousness lunacy. Midler was more emotional. When the conversation turned to Johnny's favorite songs, "I'll Be Seeing You" and "Here's That Rainy Day," Midler mentioned that she knew a chorus of the latter. She began singing the song, and after the first line, Carson joined in and turned it into an impromptu duet. Midler finished her appearance from center stage, where she slowly sang the pop standard "One for My Baby (and One More for the Road)." Carson became unexpectedly tearful, and a shot of the two of them was captured by a camera angle from across the set that had never before been used on the show. The audience became tearful as well and called the three performers out for a second bow after the taping was completed. This show was immediately recognized as a television classic that Midler considered one of the most emotional moments of her life and eventually won an Emmy for her role in it.

Carson had no guests on his final episode of The Tonight Show on May 22, 1992, which was instead a retrospective show taped before an invitation-only studio audience of family, friends, and crew. During the show, Carson regretted that the first 10 years of his tenure as host no longer exist saying that he would have loved to show the audience clips of Jayne Mansfield with Boris Karloff, Peter Lorre talking to Tallulah Bankhead and even the first appearance of Bette Midler (who had appeared on Carson's penultimate episode the night before) on the show. More than fifty million people tuned in for this finale, which ended with Carson sitting on a stool alone at center stage, similar to Jack Paar's last show. He said these final words in conclusion:

And so it has come to this: I, uh... am one of the lucky people in the world; I found something I always wanted to do and I have enjoyed every single minute of it. I want to thank the gentlemen who've shared this stage with me for thirty years. Mr. Ed McMahon, Mr. Doc Severinsen, and you people watching. I can only tell you that it has been an honor and a privilege to come into your homes all these years and entertain you. And I hope when I find something that I want to do and I think you would like and come back, that you'll be as gracious in inviting me into your home as you have been. I bid you a very heartfelt good night.

A few weeks after the final show aired, it was announced that NBC and Carson had struck a deal to develop a new series. Ultimately, however, Carson chose not to return to television. He gave only two major interviews after his retirement: one to The Washington Post in 1993, and the other to Esquire magazine in 2002. Carson hinted in his 1993 interview that he did not think he could top what he had already accomplished. He rarely appeared elsewhere after retiring, providing only a guest voice on an episode of The Simpsons, which included him performing feats of strength and featured Bette Midler as well. Carson's final television appearance was a cameo on the May 13, 1994, Late Show with David Letterman where he handed over a copy of a Top 10 List and sat in Dave's chair for a minute. He was prepared to say a few words, but the crowd's cheering was so loud and so sustained, that he humorously decided to leave without saying anything—although as he exited, he could be heard saying "Thank you, good night!"

In 2005, after Carson's death, it was revealed that he had made a habit of sending jokes to Dave Letterman via fax machine which Letterman would then sometimes incorporate into his monologues. The January 31, 2005, episode of the Late Show with David Letterman, which featured a tribute to Carson, began with a monologue by Letterman composed entirely of jokes written by Carson himself after his retirement.

In 2011, the last Carson Tonight show was ranked No. 10 on the TV Guide Network special, TV's Most Unforgettable Finales.

== See also ==
- List of The Tonight Show Starring Johnny Carson episodes
- There's... Johnny!
