= It's Not Dead Festival =

Punk and ska music festival in California

Coordinates: 34.2044°N 117.4025°W

It's Not Dead Festival was a punk rock and ska music festival held at the San Manuel Amphitheater in San Bernardino, California. The festival featured three stages, a skate and BMX half-pipe ramp, and an art display. The festival was organized by Kevin Lyman, creator of Warped Tour and was first held in October 2015. Bands that performed at the festival included Bad Religion, Less Than Jake, T.S.O.L, and Left Alone.

It's Not Dead Festival 2 took place on August 26, 2017, with Rancid and Dropkick Murphys headlining the show. Other bands included The Adicts, Me First and the Gimmie Gimmies, The Interrupters and the Toasters.
