= White Shadow (band) =

- Origin: Chicago IL, United States
- Genre: Alternative rock
- Members: Andrew Cielak; Daniel Cielak; Ryan Woodlock
- Website: Official website

White Shadow is an American rock band from Chicago, Illinois, that formed in mid-2006. Since their formation, the band has gained a large following in the northwest suburbs of Chicago for their strong song writing and their high energy performances. The band released their debut EP, White Shadow – Single, on iTunes September 17, 2011. The album was recorded at RaxTrax in Chicago.

== History ==
The band was formed in 2006 when the band members were very young and all in grade school. Specifically, Ryan and Andrew were in 3rd grade and Daniel was in 2nd grade. The boys' musical ambitions were launched when the Cielaks' father introduced Andrew and Daniel to the heavy metal band Black Sabbath while the boys were still in 2nd grade. They played in their garage and basement and began to build a following through talent shows and several smaller gigs. 2010 and 2011 were their breakout years when they competed in nine Battle of Bands throughout Illinois and won nearly every one of them with strong original songs, musicianship, and high energy stage performances. Their first gig back in their hometown was winning the Battle of the Bands at the Grove Avenue Carnival. In late 2011 they issued their first EP on iTunes, Amazon, Spotify, etc. They were featured on a READ poster by the American Library Association and join a list of celebrities like Bill Gates, Bill Cosby, Ice Cube, and Yao Ming in that program. They also participated in a benefit for the Joplin, Missouri, tornado disaster called "Jammin' for Joplin". They are played a California tour in March 2012 at Whisky a Go Go.

== Band members ==
The band is made up of three members, including brothers Andrew and Daniel Cielak.

- Andrew Cielak – Bass, harmonica, vocals
- Daniel Cielak – Drums, vocals
- Ryan Woodlock – Guitar, vocals

== Discography ==
- White Shadow – Single (2011)
