= 1981–82 United States network television schedule =

The following is the 1981–82 network television schedule for the three major English language commercial broadcast networks in the United States. The schedule covers primetime hours from September 1981 through August 1982. The schedule is followed by a list per network of returning series, new series, and series cancelled after the 1980–81 season. All times are Eastern and Pacific, with certain exceptions, such as Monday Night Football.

New series are highlighted in bold.

Each of the 30 highest-rated shows is listed with its rank and rating as determined by Nielsen Media Research.

Yellow indicates the programs in the top 10 for the season.
Cyan indicates the programs in the top 20 for the season.
Magenta indicates the programs in the top 30 for the season.

Note: A Writers Guild of America strike hindered the ability to start airing shows in a timely manner. The shows in the schedule were the first to air new episodes in their respective time periods as they premiered between September and early December. The debut month for each new series that had been intended for a fall premiere is noted as to when it actually appeared.

PBS, the Public Broadcasting Service, was in operation but the schedule was set by each local station.

== Sunday ==
| Network | | 7:00 PM | 7:30 PM | 8:00 PM | 8:30 PM | 9:00 PM | 9:30 PM | 10:00 PM | 10:30 PM |
|---|---|---|---|---|---|---|---|---|---|
| ABC | | **Code Red** (Nov.) | | **Today's FBI** (Nov.) | | The ABC Sunday Night Movie (22/19.5) | | | |
| CBS | | 60 Minutes (2/27.7) | | Archie Bunker's Place (12/21.6) | One Day at a Time (10/22.0) | Alice (5/22.7) | The Jeffersons (3/23.4) | Trapper John, M.D. (15/21.1) (Tied with Hart to Hart) | |
| NBC | Fall | Local | | CHiPs | | NBC Sunday Night Movie (Oct.) | | | |
| NBC | Winter | Local | | CHiPs | | NBC Sunday Night Movie (Oct.) | | | |
| NBC | Spring | **Father Murphy** | | CHiPs | | NBC Sunday Night Movie (Oct.) | | | |
| NBC | Summer | **Father Murphy** | | CHiPs | | NBC Sunday Night Movie (Oct.) | | | |

Note : On NBC, The Powers of Matthew Star was supposed to have aired 7-8 p.m., starting December 6, but production difficulties forced its delay into the next season.

== Monday ==
| Network | | 8:00 PM | 8:30 PM | 9:00 PM | 9:30 PM | 10:00 PM | 10:30 PM |
|---|---|---|---|---|---|---|---|
| ABC | Fall | That's Incredible! (28/18.4) (Tied with T.J. Hooker) | | Monday Night Football (11/21.8) | | | |
| ABC | Winter | That's Incredible! (28/18.4) (Tied with T.J. Hooker) | | ABC Monday Night Movie (8/22.5) | | | |
| ABC | Spring | That's Incredible! (28/18.4) (Tied with T.J. Hooker) | | ABC Monday Night Movie (8/22.5) | | | |
| ABC | Summer | **Best of the West** | Monday Night Baseball | | | | |
| CBS | Fall | Private Benjamin | The Two of Us | M*A*S*H (9/22.3) | House Calls (23/19.2) | Lou Grant | |
| CBS | Winter | **Mr. Merlin** | Private Benjamin | M*A*S*H (9/22.3) | House Calls (23/19.2) | Lou Grant | |
| CBS | Spring | Private Benjamin | **Report to Murphy** | M*A*S*H (9/22.3) | **Making the Grade** | Lou Grant | |
| CBS | Summer | Private Benjamin | WKRP in Cincinnati | M*A*S*H (9/22.3) | House Calls | Lou Grant | |
| CBS | Follow-up | Private Benjamin | WKRP in Cincinnati | M*A*S*H (9/22.3) | **Filthy Rich** | Lou Grant | |
| NBC | | Little House on the Prairie (24/19.1) (Tied with The Facts of Life) | | NBC Monday Night at the Movies | | | |

== Tuesday ==
| Network | | 8:00 PM | 8:30 PM | 9:00 PM | 9:30 PM | 10:00 PM | 10:30 PM |
|---|---|---|---|---|---|---|---|
| ABC | Fall | Happy Days (18/20.6) | Laverne & Shirley (20/19.9) | Three's Company (4/23.3) | Too Close for Comfort (6/22.6) | Hart to Hart (15/21.1) (Tied with Trapper John, M.D.) | |
| ABC | Winter | Happy Days (18/20.6) | Laverne & Shirley (20/19.9) | Three's Company (4/23.3) | Too Close for Comfort (6/22.6) | Hart to Hart (15/21.1) (Tied with Trapper John, M.D.) | |
| ABC | Spring | Happy Days (18/20.6) | **Joanie Loves Chachi** | Three's Company (4/23.3) | Too Close for Comfort (6/22.6) | Hart to Hart (15/21.1) (Tied with Trapper John, M.D.) | |
| ABC | Summer | Happy Days (18/20.6) | **Joanie Loves Chachi** | Three's Company (4/23.3) | Too Close for Comfort (6/22.6) | Hart to Hart (15/21.1) (Tied with Trapper John, M.D.) | |
| CBS | Preliminary | Local | | The CBS Tuesday Night Movies | | | |
| CBS | Fall | **Simon & Simon** (Nov.) | | The CBS Tuesday Night Movies | | | |
| CBS | Winter | **Simon & Simon** (Nov.) | | The CBS Tuesday Night Movies | | | |
| CBS | Spring | **Q.E.D.** | | The CBS Tuesday Night Movies | | | |
| CBS | Summer | **Q.E.D.** | | The CBS Tuesday Night Movies | | | |
| NBC | Preliminary | NBC Tuesday Night at the Movies | | | | Local | |
| NBC | Fall | **Father Murphy** (Nov.) | | **Bret Maverick** (Dec.) | | Flamingo Road | |
| NBC | Winter | **Father Murphy** (Nov.) | | **Bret Maverick** (Dec.) | | Flamingo Road | |
| NBC | Spring | **Bret Maverick** | | Flamingo Road | | Barbara Mandrell and the Mandrell Sisters | |
| NBC | March | **Bret Maverick** | | Flamingo Road | | **The Shape of Things** | |
| NBC | Follow-up | **Bret Maverick** | | Flamingo Road | | Various | |
| NBC | Summer | **Bret Maverick** | | **Cassie & Co.** | | Flamingo Road | |
| NBC | Follow-up | **Father Murphy** | | **Bret Maverick** | | **McClain's Law** | |

Note: On ABC, Joanie Loves Chachi premiered March 23, 1982, at 8:30 pm, in place of Laverne & Shirley. On CBS, Q.E.D. ran for 6 weeks at 8pm, from March 23 to April 27.

== Wednesday ==
| Network | | 8:00 PM | 8:30 PM | 9:00 PM | 9:30 PM | 10:00 PM | 10:30 PM |
|---|---|---|---|---|---|---|---|
| ABC | Preliminary | The Greatest American Hero | | Specials | | Dynasty (19/20.2) | |
| ABC | Fall | The Greatest American Hero | | **The Fall Guy** (Nov.) (26/19.0) | | Dynasty (19/20.2) | |
| ABC | Winter | The Greatest American Hero | | **The Fall Guy** (Nov.) (26/19.0) | | Dynasty (19/20.2) | |
| ABC | Spring | The Greatest American Hero | | **The Fall Guy** (Nov.) (26/19.0) | | Dynasty (19/20.2) | |
| ABC | Summer | The Greatest American Hero | | **The Fall Guy** (Nov.) (26/19.0) | | Dynasty (19/20.2) | |
| CBS | Preliminary | **Mr. Merlin** (Oct.) | WKRP in Cincinnati | The CBS Wednesday Night Movies | | | |
| CBS | Fall | **Mr. Merlin** (Oct.) | WKRP in Cincinnati | Nurse | | **Shannon** (Nov.) | |
| CBS | Winter | WKRP in Cincinnati | The Two of Us | The CBS Wednesday Night Movies | | | |
| CBS | Spring | **Herbie, the Love Bug** | | WKRP in Cincinnati | **Baker's Dozen** | **Shannon** | |
| NBC | Fall | Real People (21/19.7) | | The Facts of Life (24/19.1) (Tied with Little House on the Prairie) | **Love, Sidney** (Oct.) | Quincy, M.E. | |
| NBC | Winter | Real People (21/19.7) | | The Facts of Life (24/19.1) (Tied with Little House on the Prairie) | **Love, Sidney** (Oct.) | Quincy, M.E. | |
| NBC | Spring | Real People (21/19.7) | | The Facts of Life (24/19.1) (Tied with Little House on the Prairie) | **Teachers Only** | Quincy, M.E. | |
| NBC | Summer | Real People (21/19.7) | | The Facts of Life (24/19.1) (Tied with Little House on the Prairie) | **Teachers Only** | Quincy, M.E. | |

NOTE: The only episode of the sitcom Cass Malloy aired on CBS from 8:30 to 9:00 p.m. Eastern Time on July 21, 1982. Although not picked up as a regular series, it served as the pilot for the 1987–1989 syndicated sitcom She's the Sheriff.

== Thursday ==
| Network | | 8:00 PM | 8:30 PM | 9:00 PM | 9:30 PM | 10:00 PM | 10:30 PM |
|---|---|---|---|---|---|---|---|
| ABC | Fall | Mork & Mindy | **Best of the West** | Bosom Buddies | Taxi | 20/20 | |
| ABC | November | Mork & Mindy | **Best of the West** | Barney Miller | Taxi | 20/20 | |
| ABC | Winter | Mork & Mindy | **Best of the West** | Barney Miller | Taxi | 20/20 | |
| ABC | Spring | **Police Squad!** | Bosom Buddies | **9 to 5** | Taxi | 20/20 | |
| ABC | Follow-up | **No Soap, Radio** | Mork & Mindy | Barney Miller | Taxi | 20/20 | |
| ABC | Summer | **Darkroom** | | Barney Miller | Taxi | 20/20 | |
| CBS | Fall | Magnum, P.I. (17/20.9) | | Nurse | | Knots Landing | |
| CBS | November | Magnum, P.I. (17/20.9) | | Knots Landing | | **Jessica Novak** | |
| CBS | Winter | Magnum, P.I. (17/20.9) | | Knots Landing | | **Jessica Novak** | |
| CBS | Spring | Magnum, P.I. (17/20.9) | | **Cagney & Lacey** | | Knots Landing | |
| CBS | Summer | Magnum, P.I. (17/20.9) | | **Cagney & Lacey** | | Knots Landing | |
| NBC | Fall | Harper Valley | **Lewis & Clark** (Oct.) | Diff'rent Strokes | **Gimme a Break!** (Oct.) | Hill Street Blues (27/18.6) | |
| NBC | Winter | **Fame** | | Diff'rent Strokes | **Gimme a Break!** (Oct.) | Hill Street Blues (27/18.6) | |
| NBC | Spring | **Fame** | | Diff'rent Strokes | **Gimme a Break!** (Oct.) | Hill Street Blues (27/18.6) | |
| NBC | Summer | **Fame** | | Diff'rent Strokes | **Gimme a Break!** (Oct.) | Hill Street Blues (27/18.6) | |

Note: On CBS, Nurse aired at 9-10 p.m. and Knots Landing at 10-11 p.m., both in September and October. On ABC, Bosom Buddies aired at 9-9:30 p.m. in October.

== Friday ==
| Network | | 8:00 PM | 8:30 PM | 9:00 PM | 9:30 PM | 10:00 PM | 10:30 PM |
|---|---|---|---|---|---|---|---|
| ABC | Fall | Benson | Bosom Buddies | **Darkroom** (Nov.) | | **Strike Force** (Nov.) | |
| ABC | Winter | Benson | Barney Miller | **Best of the West** | Making a Living | **Strike Force** (Nov.) | |
| ABC | Spring | Benson | Barney Miller | **The Phoenix** | | **Strike Force** (Nov.) | |
| ABC | Follow-up | Benson | **Maggie** | The ABC Friday Night Movie | | | |
| CBS | Fall | The Incredible Hulk | | The Dukes of Hazzard (6/22.6) (Tied with Too Close for Comfort) | | Dallas (1/28.4) | |
| CBS | Winter | The Dukes of Hazzard (6/22.6) (Tied with Too Close for Comfort) | | Dallas (1/28.4) | | **Falcon Crest** (13/21.4) | |
| CBS | Spring | The Dukes of Hazzard (6/22.6) (Tied with Too Close for Comfort) | | Dallas (1/28.4) | | **Falcon Crest** (13/21.4) | |
| CBS | Summer | The Dukes of Hazzard (6/22.6) (Tied with Too Close for Comfort) | | Dallas (1/28.4) | | Nurse | |
| NBC | Fall | NBC Magazine | | **McClain's Law** (Nov.) | | Local | |
| NBC | Winter | NBC Magazine | | **McClain's Law** (Nov.) | | **Cassie & Co.** | |
| NBC | Follow-up | NBC Magazine | | NBC Friday Night at the Movies | | | |
| NBC | Spring | **Jokebook** | **Chicago Story** | | | **McClain's Law** | |
| NBC | Summer | **Lewis & Clark** | **Chicago Story** | | | **Cassie & Co.** | |

== Saturday ==
| Network | | 8:00 PM | 8:30 PM | 9:00 PM | 9:30 PM | 10:00 PM | 10:30 PM |
|---|---|---|---|---|---|---|---|
| ABC | Fall | **Maggie** (Oct.) | Making a Living* | The Love Boat (14/21.2) | | Fantasy Island (30/18.3) | |
| ABC | November | **Open All Night** | Making a Living* | The Love Boat (14/21.2) | | Fantasy Island (30/18.3) | |
| ABC | January | **King's Crossing** | | The Love Boat (14/21.2) | | Fantasy Island (30/18.3) | |
| ABC | Spring | **T.J. Hooker** (28/18.4) (Tied with That's Incredible!) | | The Love Boat (14/21.2) | | Fantasy Island (30/18.3) | |
| CBS | | Walt Disney | | The CBS Saturday Night Movies | | | |
| NBC | Fall | Barbara Mandrell and the Mandrell Sisters | | **Nashville Palace** | | **Fitz and Bones** | |
| NBC | Follow-up | Barbara Mandrell and the Mandrell Sisters | | Harper Valley | **Lewis & Clark** | **Billy Crystal Comedy Hour** | |
| NBC | Winter | **One of the Boys** | Harper Valley | Barbara Mandrell and the Mandrell Sisters | | **Television: Inside and Out** | |
| NBC | Follow-up | **One of the Boys** | **Chicago Story** | | | **McClain's Law** | |
| NBC | Spring | Harper Valley | One of the Boys | Barbara Mandrell and the Mandrell Sisters | | NBC Magazine | |
| NBC | Summer | **Here's Boomer** | **Harper Valley** | NBC Saturday Night at the Movies | | | |

(*) Also known as It's a Living.

Note: On ABC, Maggie was replaced by Open All Night, effective November 28; King's Crossing, which was supposed to have aired 8-9 p.m., was delayed until January, 1982, as an indirect result of the Writers Guild of America strike. On NBC, The Devlin Connection was supposed to have aired at 10:00 p.m., but Rock Hudson's heart surgery forced the delay into next season.

== By network ==
=== ABC ===
**Returning Series**

- 20/20
- The ABC Friday Night Movie
- ABC Monday Night Movie
- The ABC Sunday Night Movie
- Barney Miller
- Benson
- Bosom Buddies
- Dynasty
- Fantasy Island
- The Greatest American Hero
- Happy Days
- Hart to Hart
- Making a Living
- Laverne & Shirley
- The Love Boat
- Monday Night Baseball
- Monday Night Football
- Mork & Mindy
- Taxi
- That's Incredible!
- Three's Company
- Too Close for Comfort

**New Series**

- **9 to 5** *
- **Best of the West**
- **Code Red** *
- **Darkroom**
- **The Fall Guy**
- **Joanie Loves Chachi** *
- **King's Crossing** *
- **Maggie**
- **No Soap, Radio** *
- **Open All Night** *
- **The Phoenix** *
- **Police Squad!** *
- **Strike Force**
- **T.J. Hooker** *
- **Today's FBI**

Not returning from 1980–81:

- 240-Robert
- ABC Summer Movie
- Aloha Paradise
- Breaking Away
- Charlie's Angels
- Eight is Enough
- Foul Play
- I'm a Big Girl Now
- The Krypton Factor
- Soap
- Those Amazing Animals
- Vega$

=== CBS ===
**Returning Series**

- 60 Minutes
- Alice
- Archie Bunker's Place
- Dallas
- The Dukes of Hazzard
- House Calls
- The Incredible Hulk
- The Jeffersons
- Knots Landing
- Lou Grant
- M*A*S*H
- Magnum, P.I.
- Nurse
- One Day at a Time
- Private Benjamin
- Trapper John, M.D.
- The Two of Us
- Walt Disney (moved from NBC)
- WKRP in Cincinnati

**New Series**

- **Baker's Dozen** *
- **Cagney & Lacey** *
- **Falcon Crest**
- **Filthy Rich** *
- **Herbie, the Love Bug** *
- **Jessica Novak**
- **Making the Grade** *
- **Mr. Merlin**
- **Q.E.D.** *
- **Report to Murphy** *
- **Shannon**
- **Simon & Simon**

Not returning from 1980–81:

- Checking In
- Enos
- Flo
- Freebie and the Bean
- Ladies' Man
- Palmerstown, U.S.A.
- Park Place
- Riker
- Secrets of Midland Heights
- That's My Line
- The Tim Conway Show
- Walter Cronkite's Universe
- The Waltons
- The White Shadow

=== NBC ===
**Returning Series**

- Barbara Mandrell and the Mandrell Sisters
- CHiPs
- Diff'rent Strokes
- The Facts of Life
- Flamingo Road
- Harper Valley
- Hill Street Blues
- Little House on the Prairie
- NBC Magazine
- NBC Sunday Night Movie
- NBC Monday Night at the Movies
- Quincy, M.E.
- Real People

**New Series**

- **The Billy Crystal Comedy Hour** *
- **Bret Maverick** *
- **Cassie & Co.** *
- **Chicago Story** *
- **Fame** *
- **Father Murphy**
- **Fitz and Bones**
- **Gimme a Break!**
- **Jokebook** *
- **Lewis & Clark** *
- **Love, Sidney**
- **McClain's Law**
- **Nashville Palace**
- **One of the Boys** *
- **The Shape of Things** *
- **Teachers Only** *
- **Television: Inside and Out** *

Not returning from 1980–81:

- B.J. and the Bear
- The Big Event
- The Brady Brides
- Buck Rogers in the 25th Century
- Comedy Theater
- Disney's Wonderful World (moved to CBS)
- Games People Play
- Lobo
- Marie
- Nero Wolfe
- Number 96
- The Steve Allen Comedy Hour
- Walking Tall

Note: The * indicates that the program was introduced in midseason.
