= Must See TV =

NBC advertising slogan

- Title card for NBC's 2002 special, 20 Years of Must See TV
- Network: NBC
- Launched: Original run: September 16, 1993; Second run: September 28, 2017
- Closed: Original run: May 18, 2006; Second run: March 25, 2021
- Country of origin: United States
- Running time: Thursday nights
- Original language: American English

Must See TV was an American advertising slogan that was used by NBC to brand its primetime blocks during the 1990s, and most often applied to the network's Thursday night lineup, which featured some of its most popular sitcoms and drama series of the period, allowing the network to dominate prime time ratings on Thursday nights in the 1980s and 1990s. Ratings for NBC's lineup fell during the mid-to-late 2000s. The slogan was retired in 2015 amidst NBC's transition to airing more drama series on Thursday nights. The branding returned for the 2017–18 television season but was removed for a second time in the winter of the 2020–21 television season.

== Usage ==
In popular culture, the phrase is most strongly associated with the network's entire Thursday night lineup, including both sitcoms and dramas, which dominated the ratings from the 1980s through the late 1990s.

As originally conceived, "Must See TV" originally applied to sitcoms only (dramas would normally be promoted separately), and for much of the 1990s the phrase was used several nights a week as an attempt at brand extension. At one point in the fall of 1997, the brand was used five nights a week, with four sitcoms a night from Monday to Thursday and two more on Sunday. NBC itself would later adopt the more common interpretation; the 2002 retrospective, 20 Years of Must See TV, focused on NBC's overall dominance on Thursday nights from 1982 onwards, and overlooked extensions such as "Must See TV Tuesday."

== History ==
=== First years ===
By 1979, NBC had fallen to third place in the Nielsen ratings. Network executive Fred Silverman, who previously led ABC and CBS to the top of the ratings, joined the network the year before; however, he could not bring the same ratings success he had as programming whiz at the latter two networks, resulting in a string of new programs that were derided by critics and which were eventually cancelled after a few showings. The 1980–81 television season was the low point for NBC; as the network had only three shows in the Nielsen top 20; one of them was the sitcom Diff'rent Strokes, starring Gary Coleman and Conrad Bain, with several of its episodes revolving around serious issues such as racism, alcoholism, child abuse and others, which were dramatically explored. Debuting on Fridays and garnering modest ratings, Diff'rent Strokes entered NBC's Thursday night lineup for the 1981–82 season. Prior to the beginning of the season, Silverman left NBC in the summer of 1981, and was replaced by Brandon Tartikoff, who became a very important key point behind NBC's return to the top.

The 1981 fall season marked the very first time NBC made an attempt to create a two-hour comedy block on Thursday nights comprising the 8–10 p.m. slot, with Diff'rent Strokes being joined by the returning Harper Valley starring Barbara Eden, formerly from I Dream of Jeannie, and newcomers Gimme a Break!, starring Nell Carter as the housekeeper for a widowed police chief (played by Dolph Sweet) and his three daughters, and Lewis & Clark, a starring vehicle for Gabe Kaplan after Welcome Back, Kotter.

These four sitcoms were followed by the police drama Hill Street Blues, which premiered in January 1981, and chronicles the lives of the Metropolitan Police Department staff of a single police station located on Hill Street in an unnamed large U.S. city. While critically acclaimed, Hill Street Blues bounced to and from various time periods on Thursday, Saturday, Tuesday and Wednesday nights during its first season, which caused it to debut to poor ratings (87th out of 96 shows for the 1980–81 season) and became the lowest-rated program ever renewed for a second season at the time. NBC decided to move Hill Street Blues officially to Thursdays at 10 p.m., which resulted in a ratings success starting with its second season, and earning several industry awards, including a total of 26 Primetime Emmy Awards (out of 98 nominations) during its seven-season run, including four consecutive wins for Outstanding Drama Series from 1981–1984.

Midway through the 1981–82 season, Harper Valley and Lewis & Clark were removed from NBC's Thursday schedule, and later were canceled, being replaced by the Emmy-winning musical television series Fame, which was based on the 1980 film of the same name. That series was a critical success, receiving three consecutive nominations for an Emmy Award for Outstanding Drama Series, but losing all of them to Hill Street Blues.

=== Success in the 1980s ===
Branding the quality Thursday night lineup began during the 1982–83 season, with NBC promoting Fame, Hill Street Blues, Taxi (which was renewed by the network after being canceled by ABC after four seasons) and new arrival Cheers, as "America's Best Night of Television on Television". Diff'rent Strokes and Gimme a Break! were moved to Saturdays at the beginning of the season, with Strokes remaining on that night until its cancellation in 1985 (only to be renewed by ABC for an additional season), and Break! returning to Thursdays following the underperformance of Taxi, which at mid-season, was moved to Saturdays, and later to Wednesdays, to be eventually canceled for a second time by NBC. Fame also ended its two-season network run on NBC to be revived the following season in first-run syndication. A mid-season replacement, Mama's Family, starring Vicki Lawrence, which debuted on Saturdays, moved to Thursdays during the summer, following Fame's removal from NBC's schedule.

Meanwhile, Cheers, which starred Ted Danson and Shelley Long (and later, Kirstie Alley), set in the titular bar in Boston, where a group of locals meet to drink, relax, socialize, and escape from their day-to-day issues debuted to critical acclaim, but ended its first season with unimpressive ratings. It was the fourth-lowest rated show for the 1982–83 season (74th out of 77 in that year's ratings), and was nearly canceled by NBC. However, Cheers was renewed for a second season, in large part due to Tartikoff's continued support of the show, as well as its slow increase in viewership during its summer reruns, garnering higher ratings than when it first premiered. Its first season received 13 Primetime Emmy Award nominations in 1983, and won five of them, including an award for Outstanding Comedy Series. Cheers remained one of NBC's most successful shows on Thursday nights, becoming a top-ten hit starting with its fourth season, and reaching number one during its ninth season, earning 28 Primetime Emmy Awards from a record of 117 nominations.

The 1983–84 season saw none of NBC's new fall shows renewed for a second season, and Thursday nights weren't the exception. One of the new shows that season, was the sitcom We Got It Made, starring Teri Copley as a woman who works as a maid for two bachelors in New York City, played by Tom Villard and Matt McCoy. While the series initially started with strong ratings, critics and the general public lambasted the show, which eventually damaged its viewership as the season progressed. In December 1983, NBC began making changes to its Thursday lineup in order to make room for soon-to-be hit shows to join Cheers, Gimme a Break! and Hill Street Blues.

One of these shows, Michael J. Fox's Emmy-winning sitcom Family Ties, which reflected the social shift in the United States from the cultural liberalism of the 1960s and 1970s to the conservatism of the 1980s, debuted on Wednesdays to a modest start, but moved to Thursdays midway through its second season, resulting in a ratings rise. Family Ties replaced Mama's Family, which was moved to Saturdays, along with We Got It Made, which was replaced by Cheers returning to its original 9:00 p.m. timeslot, remaining there for the rest of its run. The show that followed it, was Dabney Coleman's Emmy-nominated series Buffalo Bill, which debuted in the summer of 1983, and returned as a mid-season replacement for its second season, and featured the misadventures of an egotistical talk show host, played by Coleman, and his staff (including Geena Davis and Joanna Cassidy, who won a Golden Globe Award for her role). Despite having been nominated for eleven Primetime Emmy Awards during its run (including two for Outstanding Comedy Series), Buffalo Bill fared not-so-well in the ratings and was canceled by NBC after two abbreviated seasons. Brandon Tartikoff later wrote in his memoir The Last Great Ride (1992), that his biggest professional regret was cancelling the show.

Meanwhile, We Got It Made and Mama's Family were moved from Thursdays to Saturdays, where ratings for both shows dropped even further and later were canceled at the end of the 1983–84 season, before eventually being revived years later for syndication. In the spring of 1984, Buffalo Bill was replaced by another short-lived comedy The Duck Factory, becoming Jim Carrey's first lead role in a Hollywood production (coincidentally, Carrey previously guest-starred on an episode of Buffalo Bill, prior to the premiere of The Duck Factory). A mid-season replacement for that season, Night Court, set in the night shift of a Manhattan Criminal Court presided over by a young, unorthodox judge, Harold "Harry" T. Stone, played by Harry Anderson, nominated three times as Best Lead Actor in a Comedy Series at the Emmys for his role, and co-starring John Larroquette, who won four consecutive Emmys for Best Supporting Actor in a Comedy Series for his role as Dan Fielding, initially aired on Wednesdays. The series was moved to Thursdays during the summer, becoming another staple of NBC's Thursday comedy night in the following years.

What marked the beginning of NBC's dominance on Thursday nights was during the 1984–85 season, when the network premiered a new show to lead that evening: The Cosby Show, which focused on the Huxtables, an upper middle-class Black American family living in New York; the series was based on routines in Bill Cosby's stand-up comedy act, which in turn were based on his family life. The Cosby Show received critical acclaim, with TV Guide listing the series as "TV's biggest hit in the 1980s", adding it "almost single-handedly revived the sitcom genre and NBC's ratings fortunes". The enormous success of The Cosby Show, which earned a Primetime Emmy Award for Outstanding Comedy Series in 1985, and became the highest-rated sitcom and the third-most watched show overall of the 1984–85 season in the US, also helped the other shows on the Thursday lineup increase their ratings dramatically. Family Ties entered the top-ten for the first time; and both Cheers and Night Court entered the top-twenty; while Hill Street Blues remained steadily in the top-thirty.

Prior to the debut of The Cosby Show, CBS was the winner on Thursday nights in the early 1980s, with a powerful lineup consisting of Magnum, P.I., Simon & Simon and Knots Landing. However, that lineup began to lose strength by the mid-1980s, especially when Cosby debuted, which also marked a major turning point for NBC as well. The network rose to second place at the end of the 1984–85 season and later reached first place at the end of the 1985–86 season, with Cosby spending five consecutive seasons as the number-one rated show on American television, and tying with CBS' All in the Family, to become the only sitcoms in the history of the Nielsen ratings to be the number-one show for five seasons, earning several accolades, including six Primetime Emmy Awards from 23 nominations.

The most well-known NBC Thursday lineup from the 1980s, which consisted of The Cosby Show, Family Ties, Cheers, Night Court and Hill Street Blues, remained until the start of the 1986–87 season, when NBC decided to move some of their most successful shows to make room for new freshman hits. Hill Street Blues was moved midway through its seventh and final season to Tuesdays. It was replaced by the new legal drama L.A. Law, co-created by Steven Bochco, which featured an ensemble cast (just as Hill Street Blues, which Bochco also co-created) and centers on the partners, associates and staff of a Los Angeles law firm, reflecting the social and cultural conflicts that were occurring from the 1980s through the early 1990s. The series debuted modestly on Friday nights and later became one of NBC's biggest successes on Thursdays, being critically acclaimed and winning 15 Primetime Emmy Awards throughout its run, four of which were for Outstanding Drama Series. The series ended after eight seasons in 1994, during the first year of "Must See TV".

Other hits on NBC Thursday nights from the 1980s, included Cosby spinoff A Different World (which premiered in 1987 and replaced Family Ties, which was moved to Sundays that year until its end in 1989), and Dear John, Judd Hirsch's starring vehicle after Taxi (which premiered in 1988 and replaced Night Court, which was moved to Wednesdays that year until its end in 1992). Eventually, Dear John, then on its second season, was also moved to Wednesdays after Night Court, and was replaced by the sitcom Grand, which premiered in 1990, but only enjoyed moderate success, and was canceled by NBC at the end of the year after two abbreviated seasons. That same year, another mid-season replacement, Wings (created by Cheers producers David Angell, Peter Casey, and David Lee) saw its debut, and began to enjoy popularity among viewers on Thursday nights in the following years.

In the summer of 1990, another comedy, Seinfeld, which stars Jerry Seinfeld as a fictionalized version of himself, debuted. Described as "a show about nothing", often focusing on the minutiae of daily life, the series premiered in 1989 with its pilot episode. After the pilot was met with poor responses from test audiences, NBC decided not to pick up the show. Believing it had potential, NBC executive Rick Ludwin ordered four episodes about a year after NBC's rejection. These four episodes, alongside the pilot, which comprised the first season of Seinfeld, started in May 1990, airing on Thursdays at 9:30 p.m. (right after Cheers) to good ratings through the summer, and eventually NBC renewed the show for a second season; in the following years, Seinfeld has received awards and nominations in various categories throughout the mid-1990s, winning seven Primetime Emmy Awards –including one in 1993 for Outstanding Comedy Series– from a total of 49 nominations, with several magazines such as Rolling Stone, Variety, The Hollywood Reporter and TV Guide placing it as one of the greatest TV shows of all time, and being a number-one hit show during seasons six and nine. As a result of the aforementioned successes, NBC ended the 1980s as the number-one network on both Thursday nights and overall.

=== Early 1990s doldrums ===
NBC's Thursday comedy lineup remained very strong during the 1990–91 season, with the continued success of The Cosby Show, A Different World and Cheers, with the latter reaching number one on the Nielsen ratings for the first and only time, becoming the most-watched show for that season. NBC itself, continued as the number-one network overall, but their viewership began to decline gradually, as its dominance during the 1980s began to fade through the season, due to the growing popularity of ABC's Tuesday and Friday night lineups and Fox's decision to move freshman hit The Simpsons to Thursdays to compete with The Cosby Show, which eventually slipped down to fifth place after spending five straight seasons on top.

During the 1991–92 season, ratings for Cosby –now in its eighth and final season– and A Different World decreased considerably and both shows were no longer inside the top-ten, while Wings continued to rise in popularity, as it entered the top-20 for the first time. It was during that season, with The Simpsons still competing against Cosby on Thursdays would show its effects, as the episode "Homer at the Bat", aired in February 1992, marked the very first time a new Simpsons episode beat a new Cosby Show episode on ratings. It happened again in March of that year, as the new Simpsons episode "Colonel Homer" outrated a new Cosby episode. The season ended with NBC dropping to second place after six consecutive seasons on top, beaten by a resurgent CBS (which rose from third place to first), with Cheers becoming the network's only show landing in the top-ten.

After Cosby aired its one-hour final episode in the spring of 1992, several changes were made to the NBC Thursday night lineup for the 1992–93 season: a new sitcom, Rhythm & Blues, premiered to only be pulled off by the network after five episodes, and was replaced by another new sitcom, Out All Night, starring Patti LaBelle, but it wasn't a ratings success either, being also canceled afterwards. Meanwhile, A Different World saw its ratings drop dramatically after its parent series ended its run, and later was removed from NBC's Thursday schedule in 1993 and replaced by reruns of Cheers. That same year, Seinfeld, which by then was airing on Wednesdays, but struggling on viewership due to its competition with ABC's Home Improvement, was moved permanently to Thursdays, once again after Cheers, which ended in May 1993 after eleven seasons, with its series finale being the second-highest-rated series finale of all-time behind the series finale of M*A*S*H and the highest-rated episode of the 1992–93 season in the US.

However, as NBC was still the winner on Thursday nights by then, some shows on another networks began to challenge its powerful lineup, such as Matlock and Primetime Live on ABC –the former show has been canceled by NBC after six seasons, after it was renewed by ABC and remained on that network for three more seasons until 1995–; as well as the continued success of The Simpsons on Fox. This, despite the phenomally successful performance from the series finale of Cheers, as well as Seinfeld's sudden rise in viewership after its move to Thursdays, resulted in NBC ending the 1992–93 season dropping to third place for the first time since the 1983–84 season, with Cheers once again becoming the network's only show landing in the top-ten for the season.

=== First run (1993–2006) ===
==== Brand debuts (1993–94) ====
The "Must See" slogan was created by Dan Holm, an NBC promotional producer, during a network promo brainstorming session in June 1993 at NBC's West Coast headquarters in Burbank, California. "Must See TV" made its first appearance in NBC promotions through August 1993 and included the day of the week: "Must See TV Thursday". The advertisement ended with the sentence "Get home early for Must See TV Thursday". In late summer of 1993, NBC wanted viewers to tune in an hour prior to Seinfeld, and created the "Must See TV" slogan to brand the comedy block. The first "Must See TV" block promo aired during late summer repeats and promoted Wings, Seinfeld, Cheers (which also previewed the fall premiere of its spin-off, Frasier) and new arrival Mad About You, which was moved to Thursdays after being initially aired on Wednesdays and later on Saturdays, starring Paul Reiser and Helen Hunt as a married couple in New York City as they navigate life together (eventually having their daughter in later seasons), which won numerous awards, including four Golden Globe Awards and twelve Primetime Emmy Awards, including an award for Hunt as Outstanding Lead Actress in a Comedy Series for four years in a row (from 1996 to 1999); the show itself also received five Emmy nominations for Outstanding Comedy Series.

The "Must See TV" premiere night of programming occurred on September 16, 1993, with the season premieres of Mad About You, Wings and Seinfeld, as well as the series premiere of Frasier, while L.A. Law returned on the first week of October. The "Must See TV" slogan continued in every NBC Thursday night comedy promo throughout the 1993–94 season to promote the 8–10 p.m. comedy block (L.A. Law was often added as part of some "Must See TV" promos). Frasier, the new fall show, was developed by Cheers producers and Wings creators David Angell, Peter Casey, and David Lee, and starred Kelsey Grammer reprising his Cheers role as Frasier Crane, who returns to his hometown, Seattle, as a radio show host. The show eventually becoming one of the most-critically acclaimed comedy series of all time and one of the most successful spin-off series in television history. The series won a total of 37 Emmy Awards during its 11-year run, breaking the record long held by CBS' The Mary Tyler Moore Show (29). It held the record until 2016 when Game of Thrones won 38. Grammer and David Hyde Pierce each won four, including one each for the fifth and eleventh seasons. The series is tied with ABC's Modern Family for the most consecutive wins for Outstanding Comedy Series, winning five from 1994 to 1998.

Meanwhile, L.A. Law, the lineup's sole remaining show from the 1980s, began to experience a sharp decline in ratings during its final two seasons. The show went on hiatus in January 1994 during its eighth and final season, in order to launch the second season of Homicide: Life on the Street. When that series succeeded wildly with a guest appearance by Robin Williams, it was expected that L.A. Law would conclude that May and Homicide would succeed it on Thursdays in the 1994 fall season; however, Homicide was moved to Fridays, with a new show, the eventually breakout hit ER taking its place. NBC decided not to renew L.A. Law for a ninth season at the last minute; ending the show without a proper finale or wrapping up story lines; until eight years later, when NBC agreed to produce a television movie, a reunion show titled L.A. Law: The Movie, aired in May 2002 and featuring most of the main cast from the series.

==== Explosive success in the 1990s (1994–2000) ====
For the 1994–95 season, three new shows premiered on Thursdays that fall. The first one, Friends, which revolved around six friends living in Manhattan, enjoyed huge success in both ratings and critical reception, spending its entire run inside the top-ten most-watched programs in the United States, including a season at number one (season eight), and being nominated for 62 Primetime Emmy Awards, winning six of them. The second one, ER, which followed the inner life of the emergency room of Cook County General Hospital, and the various critical professional, ethical, and personal issues faced by the department's crew, debuted to become the second longest-running primetime medical drama in American television history behind ABC's Grey's Anatomy; the highest awarded medical drama, winning 128 industry awards from 442 nominations, including the Primetime Emmy Award for Outstanding Drama Series in 1996. The third one, Madman of the People, starring Dabney Coleman as an outspoken newspaper columnist who had written a popular column on a magazine, only enjoyed moderate success and was canceled before the 1994–95 season ended, despite being the 12th most watched show in the US, mostly because it lost a considerable portion of its lead-in audience from Seinfeld, which became the most-watched show in the US that season. For the next four seasons, Seinfeld and ER would end up battling for the honor of the number-one show, before the former series ended its run in 1998.

On November 3, 1994, NBC's Thursday night lineup featured the "Blackout Thursday" programming stunt, in which three of the four sitcoms on that night's "Must See TV" schedule incorporated a story line involving a power outage in New York City. The stunt started with Mad About You episode "Pandora's Box", in which Jamie Buchman (Helen Hunt) accidentally causes the blackout while trying to steal cable; it continued with the Friends episode "The One with the Blackout", featuring a sub-plot in which Chandler Bing (Matthew Perry) is trapped in an ATM vestibule with Victoria's Secret model Jill Goodacre and ended with the Madman of the People episode "Birthday in the Big House" (the Seinfeld episode that followed Friends and preceded Madman, "The Gymnast", did not have a blackout story line though was promoted as part of the event). All these changes resulted in Frasier and Wings moving to a new night of "Must See TV" on Tuesdays. After two seasons at third place, NBC rose to second place at the end of the 1994–95 season.

The 1995–96 season, brought more success for NBC, as the network rose again to first place in the Nielsen ratings in five years. In addition to Seinfeld, Friends and ER, two new shows debuted that fall, which became successful during their first seasons: The Single Guy, starring Jonathan Silverman (previously from Gimme a Break!) as a struggling New York City writer; and Caroline in the City, starring Lea Thompson (previously from the Back to the Future film trilogy) as a cartoonist who lives in Manhattan. Later, a mid-season replacement debuted, Boston Common, created by David Kohan and Max Mutchnick (which later went on to create Will & Grace) and starring Anthony Clark (prior to appearing years later on the CBS sitcom Yes, Dear) as an easy-going twenty-something from Virginia who delivers his sister to college in Boston. All three shows ended the 1995–96 season inside the top-ten most watched shows in the US.

Despite the strong ratings of The Single Guy (6th), NBC was disappointed in the show's critical failure, and for its second season, the series underwent retooling, but it didn't work; following an abrupt move to another night of "Must See TV" on Wednesdays, ratings plummeted and the show was canceled, despite ending its second season as the eighth most-watched show for the 1996–97 season. Meanwhile, Caroline in the City performed very well during its first season (4th); however, for its second season, the show was moved to its "Must See TV Tuesday" night (following Frasier), for which ratings dropped considerably, dropping to 23rd (tying with three more shows), yet its moderate performance was enough to be renewed for a third season. After Boston Common debuted strongly (8th), it was moved to Sundays (another night of "Must See TV") for its second season, where its ratings collapsed, leading to its cancelation.

At that point, NBC dominated Thursday nights and could send even a high-rated competing popular show into dramatic ratings decline on that evening. In an effort to cut into NBC's "Must See TV" viewership for the 1995–96 season, CBS boldly decided to move its powerhouse top-ten hit show Murder, She Wrote from its popular Sunday night to Thursdays for its 12th and final season; however, the strategy was a failure as a whole, as Murder, She Wrote and the rest of CBS' Thursday lineup, proved to be no match for NBC. Murder, She Wrote, on its new night, now going against Friends and The Single Guy/Boston Common at the same time, marked a significant ratings drop from the previous season –from 8th (which ironically tied with Friends) to 58th place– resulting in Murder to be canceled by CBS at the end of the 1995–96 season after twelve seasons in the air.

For the 1996–97 season, three shows were included to NBC "Must See TV Thursday" –one fall series and two mid-season entries–. Suddenly Susan was the new fall show for the season, which stars Brooke Shields as a glamorous San Francisco magazine writer who begins to adjust to being single, and who learns to be independent minded after having been taken care of all her life. For her role as Susan, Shields earned two Golden Globe Award nominations for Best Actress in a Television Comedy. It also debuted initially with high ratings, mostly due to its timeslot, airing between Seinfeld and ER during its first season, attracting almost 25 million viewers per episode, despite mostly unfavorable critical reviews. The two mid-season replacements for the season included The Naked Truth, starring Téa Leoni and Holland Taylor, which took place at the office of a tabloid news publication, which was canceled by ABC after its first season, despite earning respectable ratings, and was moved to NBC after it underwent a general retooling (such as the inclusion of George Wendt to the main cast); and Fired Up, a starring vehicle for Sharon Lawrence after her role as Sylvia Costas in NYPD Blue, with Lawrence playing a self-centered promotions executive.

Suddenly Susan, The Naked Truth and Fired Up resulted in ratings successes during their initial debuts on NBC, ending at 3rd, 4th, and 6th, respectively. However, for the 1997–98 season, all three shows were moved to Mondays (which became another "Must See TV" programming night) and experienced a large decline in viewership, leading both The Naked Truth and Fired Up to being canceled by NBC when the season ended, while Suddenly Susan remained on Monday nights for two more seasons until its cancellation in 2000.

The 1997–98 season saw the debut of two new comedies on Thursday nights: The first one was Veronica's Closet, Kirstie Alley's starring vehicle since Cheers, where she was nominated in 1998 for a Primetime Emmy Award for Outstanding Lead Actress in a Comedy Series for her role as the title character, Veronica "Ronnie" Chase, the owner and head of the titular fictional lingerie company in New York City; it spent its first two seasons inside the top-ten most watched shows in the US, before it was moved to Mondays for its third season, where ratings collapsed after that, leading into its cancellation. The second new show was Union Square, which despite earning higher ratings (ending as the seventh-most watched show for the season), it was poorly received by critics, and lost a large portion of its lead-in audience from Friends; the show was canceled in January 1998, after 14 episodes had been made (the final episode remained unaired).

After Union Square was canceled, another show, Just Shoot Me! took its place. The show, which stars Laura San Giacomo and George Segal, and took place in the office of a fashion magazine, debuted on Wednesdays in March 1997 to mediocre ratings, and started its second season on Tuesdays before it was moved to Thursdays for that season, where its ratings improved considerably, and in later seasons, it soon became a staple in the "Must See TV Thursday" lineup. Meanwhile, Seinfeld entered his ninth and final season on NBC, as Jerry Seinfeld announced that the series would end production the following spring in 1998; its series finale, became the fourth-most watched overall series finale in the US after M*A*S*H, Cheers and The Fugitive, with its ninth and final season reaching the top of the Nielsen ratings, becoming only the third show finishing its runs at the top of the ratings, following I Love Lucy and The Andy Griffith Show. Consequently, Friends emerged as NBC's biggest television show after the 1998 Seinfeld final broadcast.

After Seinfeld ended its run in 1998, some changes were made to the "Must See TV Thursday" lineup for the 1998–99 season, with Frasier returning to that night for the first time since season one, after spending four consecutive seasons on Tuesdays, and a new show premiering that fall, Jesse, which marked Christina Applegate's starring vehicle since her role as Kelly Bundy on Married... with Children; and debuted with impressive ratings (ranked 5th at the end of the season); however, as the show entered its second season, despite maintaining its Thursday timeslot (after Friends and before Frasier), ratings drop considerably (ranked 12nd at the end of the season), mostly because it lost much of the audience from Friends, its powerful lead-in, and by season 2, Jesse lost almost 20% of the Friends audience, as a result, NBC decided to cancel the show afterwards.

Also, for the 1998–99 season, another show entered the "Must See TV Thursday" lineup: Will & Grace, which focuses on the friendship between best friends Will Truman (Eric McCormack), a gay lawyer, and Grace Adler (Debra Messing), a straight interior designer. After initially debuted with not-so-well ratings on Monday nights, it was moved to later become not only a staple of NBC Thursday night during the 2000s decade, but a critical and ratings success as well. Will & Grace became a highly rated television show in the United States, earning a top-twenty rating during four of its eight seasons, including one season in the top-ten; the show also was nominated for 83 Primetime Emmy Awards, winning 18 of them, including once for Outstanding Comedy Series in 2000; also, its lead stars Eric McCormack, Debra Messing, Sean Hayes, and Megan Mullally each won at least one Emmy Award for their respective performances, becoming one of four live-action sitcoms, along with All in the Family, The Golden Girls and Schitt's Creek, where all the principal actors have won at least one Emmy Award.

For the 1999–2000 season, as approaching the new decade, a new fall show debuted on Thursdays, the sitcom Stark Raving Mad, a starring vehicle for Tony Shalhoub after Wings, and for Neil Patrick Harris after Doogie Howser, M.D., however, despite it won a People's Choice Award for Favorite New Television Comedy Series and ended as the 15th most-watched program for the season, it lost much of the audience from Frasier and was consistently beaten by ABC's Who Wants to Be a Millionaire in the same timeslot; NBC canceled the show after one season. Two mid-season replacements aired during the spring of 2000: Battery Park, which was co-created by Gary David Goldberg —who previously created Family Ties and Spin City— but was a disappointment on ratings and was canceled after only four episodes were aired; and Daddio, a starring vehicle for Michael Chiklis after The Commish, which initially started with good ratings (15th), before moving to Mondays for its shortened second season, only to be canceled after a few weeks.

NBC Entertainment president Warren Littlefield stated that the network is “trying to spread out our offense” to new nights, as through the mid-to-late 1990s, several shows were moving from its original Thursday night to different nights and timeslots, due to NBC's plan to expand the "Must See TV" programming to at least two or three nights during the week; causing several shows saw their viewership decreasing, and eventually being canceled afterwards. Despite this, NBC dominated once again Thursday nights for the rest of the 1990s decade, in large part due to the continued success of Friends, Seinfeld, Frasier and ER.

==== Sunday, Monday, Tuesday and Wednesday nights ====
Seeing how "Must See TV" dominated prime time on Thursdays, NBC felt that the same marketing power could translate into success for Monday, Tuesday, Wednesday and Sunday nights.

During the 1980s, a decade prior to "Must See TV", while Thursdays became NBC's biggest programming night, the network managed to replicate a similar success for Saturday nights, airing a two-hour comedy night as well, followed by a drama series (most notably, Hunter). The Saturday lineup includes an eclectic mix of family-themed shows and sophisticated comedies aimed at an older audience, such as Gimme a Break!, Diff'rent Strokes and The Facts of Life, with that success exploding during the 1985–86 season with the premiere of The Golden Girls which debuted to critical acclaim and ratings success, followed by other hits, including 227, Amen and Empty Nest; however, that success –in a similar way to Thursdays– began to wane during the 1991–92 season, when The Golden Girls ended its run, resulting in a considerable ratings drop for its follow-up shows Empty Nest and its spin-off Nurses; as well as several short-lived sitcoms which didn't have long-lasting impact on ratings or critical reception, such as The Torkelsons, The Mommies, The Powers That Be –a starring vehicle for John Forsythe after Dynasty–, Here and Now –a starring vehicle for Malcolm-Jamal Warner after The Cosby Show– and Café Americain –a starring vehicle for Valerie Bertinelli after One Day at a Time–. Despite NBC's Saturday comedy night was never included into the "Must See TV" programming block after its creation, the comedy block remained until the 1995–96 season, but was shortened to one hour, and later discontinued when the 1996 fall season began with the premiere of three dramas (Dark Skies, The Pretender and Profiler).

While "Must See TV Thursday" was created in 1993, and NBC continued its Saturday two-hour comedy block at that time, there was a third two-hour night of comedy on Tuesdays (which also by then, it wasn't part of the "Must See TV" block), which promoted four new shows debuting that night: Saved by the Bell: The College Years, a sequel to the original series and the first one to air on prime time; Getting By, which was moved from ABC after it spent its abbreviated first season on the TGIF Friday night schedule; the short-lived sitcom The Second Half, and The John Larroquette Show, a starring vehicle for John Larroquette after his nine-year run as Dan Fielding on Night Court. However, the NBC's Tuesday lineup for that season wasn't a ratings winner, especially as it went against ABC's powerhouse Tuesday comedy lineup –including Roseanne, Full House and Coach–, with three of its four new series being canceled at the end of the 1993–94 season, with Larroquette dodging cancellation, and eventually running for three more seasons.

For the 1994–95 season, NBC decided to keep the Tuesday comedy block running, but this time, it was rebranded as "Must See TV Tuesday", with Frasier and Wings moving to that night, joining Larroquette and a new show, The Martin Short Show, which was pulled off from NBC's schedule after only three episodes aired, yet it ended as the 29th most-watched show in the US, which led to repeats of other NBC sitcoms airing in order to fill Martin Short slot, eventually, another new comedy Something Wilder (after debuting on Saturdays to lackluster ratings) entered the Tuesday lineup, but was dropped from NBC's schedule and replaced by NewsRadio, a mid-season replacement, which focused on the work lives of the staff of a New York City AM news radio station, garnering moderate success. The "Must See TV Tuesday" was successful in comparison with its previous season, as it began to catch up ABC's lineup for the evening –this time with Home Improvement and Grace Under Fire on that night–.

For the 1995–96 season, NBC added a third night of "Must See TV" on Sunday nights with the premiere of Brotherly Love –starring Joey Lawrence on his third sitcom for NBC, after Gimme a Break! and Blossom, with his real-life brothers Matthew and Andrew co-starring alongside him–; and Minor Adjustments –starring future That's So Raven star Rondell Sheridan– (both shows were later canceled by NBC during the season, and were picked up by The WB and UPN, respectively), and the moves of Mad About You and freshman comedy Hope and Gloria from Thursdays to Sundays –eventually Hope and Gloria was then moved to Saturdays until the show was canceled–. Also, on Tuesdays, in addition to Wings, NewsRadio and Frasier, a new show debuted that night: The Pursuit of Happiness, created by David Hackel, who recently worked on Wings and Frasier, but was a ratings failure and was canceled by NBC after six weeks on the air. After being on Saturdays when the 1995 fall season started, Larroquette returned to Tuesdays to fill in Pursuit slot; while a mid-season replacement, 3rd Rock from the Sun debuted with healthy ratings (22nd at the end of the season).

For the 1996–97 season, NBC added a fourth "Must See TV" comedy block on Wednesdays, which included Wings (which entered its eighth and final season), Larroquette (which was abruptly canceled midway through its fourth season), NewsRadio and new arrival Men Behaving Badly, all being followed by the legal drama Law & Order. Mad About You was moved from Sundays to Tuesdays that season, to join Frasier, Caroline in the City and the new series Something So Right, with the latter show moving to ABC for its second season. 3rd Rock from the Sun was moved from Tuesdays to Sundays, where it was still sporting respectable ratings (27th at the end of the season); its follow-up Boston Common (transferred from Thursdays) did not enjoy the same success as 3rd Rock on that same night and it was later canceled.

For the 1997–98 season, NBC expanded the "Must See TV" programming block into five nights a week, with four sitcoms a night from Monday to Thursday, and two on Sundays. However, at that point, though it received heavy promotion by NBC, all four nights did not replicate the enormous success of "Must See TV Thursday". The Sunday one-hour comedy was officially dropped out, following Men Behaving Badly's abrupt cancellation and NBC's decision to not renew the Jenny McCarthy show Jenny after its first season, in order to gave priority to air two hours of Dateline NBC, followed by the NBC Sunday Night Movie. The "Must See TV Monday" night featured sitcoms centered around a professional single woman, including Caroline in the City, Suddenly Susan, Fired Up and The Naked Truth, which all of them debuted on Thursdays to a strong start, but their ratings underperformed following their moves to Mondays. Meanwhile, both NewsRadio and Just Shoot Me! were moved from Wednesdays to Tuesdays to join Mad About You and Frasier. Wednesdays became the weakest night of "Must See TV", as 3rd Rock from the Sun became the most-successful show for the evening, with other shows: The Tony Danza Show (starring Tony Danza, formerly from Who's the Boss?); Working (starring Fred Savage, formerly from The Wonder Years); and Build to Last not surviving after one or two seasons.

For the 1998–99 season, the "Must See TV Tuesday" night lost strength due to the move of Frasier to Thursdays, with Just Shoot Me! and Mad About You continuing to earn moderate ratings; a new series for the night, Encore! Encore! struggled in the ratings early on and was canceled at mid-season, alongside the short-lived show Working. The Wednesday comedy night was shortened to one hour, to gave priority to Dateline NBC, with NewsRadio and 3rd Rock from the Sun being the only two comedies for the night, followed by Law & Order, which now became the most-successful show for that evening. At mid-season, Mad About You was moved to Monday nights midway through its seventh and final season, leading to a sharp decrease in viewership, and being subsequently canceled, ending in the spring of 1999, however, 20 years later, the show returned for a limited season-eight revival, picked up by Spectrum Originals for 12 episodes, in which Paul Reiser and Helen Hunt reprised their roles. Meanwhile, on Tuesdays, 3rd Rock and NewsRadio joined Just Shoot Me!, with Will & Grace shoring up the lineup; however, NewsRadio ended its run in May 1999 after five seasons.

For the 1999–2000 season, NBC dropped out the Wednesday two-hour comedy block entirely. Meanwhile, the Monday night comedy was shortened to one hour, with Suddenly Susan and Veronica's Closet (both of which entered their final seasons) filling the spots, before moving to Tuesdays to join 3rd Rock, Just Shoot Me! and Will & Grace; after that, NBC began to promote Mondays and Wednesdays in a standard fashion, leaving Thursdays and Tuesdays, the only "Must See TV" programming nights.

==== Decline and end of first run (2000–2006) ====
The 2000–01 season started great for NBC and its Thursday lineup, with Friends, ER, Just Shoot Me! and Will & Grace continuing with very strong ratings, with a new sitcom, Cursed (later renamed The Weber Show) a starring vehicle for Steven Weber and Amy Pietz since their roles on Wings and Caroline in the City, respectively, joining the lineup, but struggled through the season and was canceled by NBC, despite ending as the 22nd most-watched show in the US. However, that season marked the beginning of the decline of "Must See TV", as that night's programming become increasingly stronger on other networks. CBS was first to break through with its lineup of Survivor and CSI: Crime Scene Investigation, followed by 48 Hours.

When Survivor premiered in the summer of 2000, Kelly Kahl, then vice-president of scheduling at CBS, took a risk and moved the show's second season to Thursdays in competition with Friends; the strategy worked as Survivor won viewership numbers over Friends, giving Kahl significant sway within CBS to continue supporting the show, which ended as the number-one rated show in the US for the 2000–01 season. NBC made an attempt to get comedy back to Mondays, with the returning show Daddio (which was successful during its abbreviated first season on Thursdays) and a new sitcom, Tucker, however both shows were canceled just after four weeks into the 2000 fall season, being replaced by Dateline NBC. Frasier returned to Tuesday nights, to continued success on ratings; joining 3rd Rock from the Sun (which entered its sixth and final season) and two new shows: The Michael Richards Show –a starring vehicle for Michael Richards after Seinfeld– and DAG –starring Delta Burke and David Alan Grier–, both of which were critical failures and also disappointed on ratings, being canceled by the network at the end of the season. At that point, NBC had gone from the top-rated network on Thursday nights and overall to second behind CBS, mostly due to the strength of Survivor and CSI.

NBC recovered the following season, when the network rose again to first place, and Friends finally hit number one for the first time during its eighth season at the end of the 2001–02 season, where the network premiered a new show on Thursdays, Inside Schwartz, which despite being ranked 16th on the Nielsen ratings, the show was canceled as network executives believed that the valuable time slot could get higher ratings; that time slot was filled with a new series, Leap of Faith, which aired for six episodes and ended at 9th on ratings, and finally NBC simply aired repeat episodes of Friends, which had higher ratings than either Inside Schwartz or Leap of Faith. In addition to Frasier on Tuesdays, as well as several short-lived sitcoms such as Watching Ellie –a starring vehicle for Julia Louis-Dreyfus after Seinfeld–, a new show debuted that night following that show: Scrubs, starring Zach Braff, which follows the lives of employees at a teaching hospital, earning critical acclaim, with many critics praising its cast, characters, and humor (especially the fantasy sequences of the central character, John "J.D." Dorian, played by Braff), and being nominated for a variety of different awards, including 17 Emmy Awards (with two wins).

For the 2002–03 season, Friends, ER and Will & Grace continued to perform strong on Thursdays, with Scrubs and the new sitcom Good Morning, Miami joining the night; with the latter series struggling in the ratings when compared to its fellow sitcoms in the lineup, yet it ranked at 23rd on the Nielsen ratings. However, the continued success of Survivor and CSI (which became the number-one rated show for that season), and the addition of Without a Trace to the lineup, were enough for CBS to dethrone NBC's Thursday lineup, becoming the most-watched network on that night. The same fate goes to Tuesday nights, as ratings for Frasier began to decline considerably, and Just Shoot Me! after being moved to that night to compete with Fox's powerhouse American Idol, and then moved to Saturday nights, was enough for NBC to cancel the show after seven seasons, dropping dramatically from 20th to 107th for its final season. During the spring of 2003, several game shows joined NBC Tuesday night lineup, such as Let's Make a Deal, Last Comic Standing and Dog Eat Dog, meaning that for the first time since 1993, NBC began to promote Tuesday evenings in a standard fashion, no longer having a two-hour comedy block on that night through the entire season.

The 2003–04 season marked the end of two of NBC's most popular shows: Friends on Thursdays; and Frasier on Tuesdays. Friends ended its ten-season run as the fourth-most watched show; while Frasier ended its eleven-season run outside the top 30. Despite Friends, ER and Will & Grace continued to bring great ratings on Thursdays, NBC was no longer the top-rated network on that night, as its other sitcoms on the lineup (Scrubs and the new show Coupling) were not performing well as the network expected –Coupling was canceled before the season ended–, as well as the continued strong performances of Survivor, CSI and Without a Trace on CBS.

After airing a two-hour comedy block on Thursday for 21 straight seasons, NBC broke with tradition in 2004 by replacing the 9 p.m. hour with the hour-long reality competition program The Apprentice (ending as the fifth-most watched show in the US for the season), although its Thursday night lineup retained its top 20 position. In an attempt to bring back the two-hour comedy on Tuesdays, in addition to Frasier and the returning Good Morning, Miami (before being canceled after its creators sued NBC), two new shows debuted: Whoopi, starring Whoopi Goldberg and Happy Family, John Larroquette's third sitcom for NBC (after Night Court and The John Larroquette Show), with both shows underperforming on ratings and being critical disappointments, leading to their cancellations at the end of the season. By that point, the "Must See TV" slogan had fallen by the wayside in NBC's promotions.

When the 2004–05 season began, there was no longer a two-hour comedy night on both Thursdays and Tuesdays, as only two sitcoms aired per night, followed by dramas and/or game shows. On Thursday nights, following the end of Friends, a spin-off premiered that fall: Joey, which starred Matt LeBlanc reprising his role as Joey Tribbiani, debuted and aired on the same timeslot as Friends, however, unlike its parent series, Joey was panned by critics and wasn't a ratings winner, being consistently beaten by Survivor on CBS. Even, ratings for Will & Grace dropped significantly, as no longer was inside the top-30; while ER and The Apprentice were still performing well, though at that point, ratings for both shows slowly began to fall; with the evening belonging to CBS and its entire Thursday lineup –Survivor, CSI and Without a Trace– ending inside the top-ten most watched shows in the US for the 2004–05 season. Meanwhile, on Tuesdays, after Frasier ended its run, Scrubs returned to that night, airing alongside a couple of short-lived sitcoms, until the spring of 2005, when NBC premiered a new show, The Office, which debuted as a mid-season replacement, to became not only a mainstay on NBC's Thursday schedule in the following years, but a critical success as well, winning several awards such a Peabody Award in 2006, a Golden Globe Award for Steve Carell's performance, and five Emmys, including one for Outstanding Comedy Series.

For what would become the final season of the first run of "Must See TV", the slogan returned at the start of the 2005–06 season, when NBC promoted the season premieres of Joey, Will & Grace, The Apprentice and ER. As the season progressed, Joey was put on hiatus after its ratings collapsed during its second season, and eventually was canceled in March 2006; Will & Grace, the sole remaining anchor of the evening, ended originally its run after eight seasons –until the show was revived by NBC and enjoyed three more seasons from 2017 to 2020–; The Apprentice moved at mid-season to Mondays; and ER reached a new ratings low, barely making the top 30. Attempting to re-establish the Thursday two-hour comedy night, in addition to Will & Grace and a mid-season replacement Four Kings, NBC transferred from Tuesdays: The Office and the new show My Name Is Earl, which became another staple on Thursday nights for the next four years and earned several Primetime Emmy Awards during its run; while Scrubs remained on Tuesdays, as the sole sitcom for the night. After the season concluded, NBC discontinued the "Must See TV" slogan shortly after.

=== Post-Must See TV (2006–2017) ===
==== "Comedy Night Done Right" (2006–2012) ====
From a promo for "Comedy Night Done Right" in October 2007. The image features [From Left] Earl Hickey (of My Name Is Earl), Michael Scott (of The Office), John Dorian (of Scrubs) and Liz Lemon (of 30 Rock).

After "Must See TV" ended its first run in the spring of 2006; the Tuesday comedy night was retired entirely, leaving Thursdays, NBC's only programming night for sitcoms. The network's Thursday lineup for the 2006–07 season initially consisted of an hour of sitcoms (My Name Is Earl and The Office), followed by Deal or No Deal, and then by ER. In November 2006, in order to bring back again the Thursday two-hour comedy night, NBC rebranded the Thursday format with a different slogan, "Comedy Night Done Right", and added Scrubs and new arrival 30 Rock to the lineup, forming an entire lineup of comedy series without laugh tracks or the multiple-camera setup common with past "Must See TV" comedies. 30 Rock received critical acclaim from critics and audiences since its release, ranking as one of the great TV comedies of all-time, as well as earning several awards and accolades, such as the Primetime Emmy Award for Outstanding Comedy Series for three consecutive years (plus receiving four more nominations after that). However, despite re-establishing its Thursday lineup, the other three networks began to outrate the entire lineup as a whole, which was consistently beaten by Survivor, CSI and Shark on CBS; Grey's Anatomy and Ugly Betty on ABC; and Are You Smarter than a 5th Grader? on Fox. Even ER, which was a number-one hit for most of the 1990s, dropped out of the top-30 for the first time that season. By that point, NBC reached a new low, ending the 2006–07 season in fourth place (behind CBS, Fox and ABC).

The same Thursday lineup (My Name Is Earl, The Office, Scrubs, 30 Rock and ER) remained for the 2007–08 season, where its lineup were still outrated by the three other networks, specially by CBS. That season turned to be the final year for Scrubs on NBC, before it was moved to ABC for its final two original seasons (and its 2026 revival). The rest of the lineup continued sporting moderate ratings, earning renewal for the following season.

For the 2008–09 season, almost the same Thursday lineup continued on NBC, with one new show debuting that fall in order to replace Scrubs: Kath & Kim, which was adapted from the Australian television series of the same name, and initially debuted strong when its started, but viewership declined afterwards, in addition to receiving negative criticism from viewers and television critics, NBC pulled off the show the following year and replaced it with a mid-season entry, which became another successful show inside its Thursday comedy night: Parks & Recreation, which, after receiving mixed reviews during its first season, it earned critical acclaim for the rest of its run, due to a re-approach to its tone and format, receiving several awards and nominations, including 14 Primetime Emmy Award nominations (two for Outstanding Comedy Series), a Golden Globe Award win for Amy Poehler's performance and a nomination for the Golden Globe Award for Best Television Series – Musical or Comedy, and a Peabody Award. Meanwhile, that season, ER and My Name is Earl ended their runs on NBC, after spending fifteen and four seasons, respectively.

For the 2009–10 season, to fill in My Name Is Earl slot, a new comedy premiered in the fall of 2009, which became another staple on NBC Thursday nights: the sitcom Community, developing a cult following and receiving acclaim for its acting, direction, writing, and meta-humor, winning a Primetime Emmy Award from four nominations and received the Critics' Choice Television Award for Best Comedy Series in 2012, among other accolades. In addition to Parks & Recreation, The Office and 30 Rock; The Jay Leno Show took over ER timeslot, however Jay Leno was removed from the schedule in February 2010, due to low ratings.

A promo for "Comedy Night Done Right All Night" in 2011

For the 2010–11 season, in addition to Community, 30 Rock and The Office, a new sitcom premiered to complete the lineup that fall: Outsourced, however, it received mixed reviews and NBC decided to not renew the show for the following season; that season also marked the brief return of The Apprentice to Thursday nights, before moving at mid-season to Sundays. On January 20, 2011, NBC rebranded the night once again, renaming it "Comedy Night Done Right – All Night", adding a third hour of comedies at 10 p.m. (the network had previously run a three-hour comedy lineup once annually on Thursdays during the late 1990s and early 2000s as a programming stunt). The three-hour comedy block consisted on Community, 30 Rock, The Office, Outsourced, the mid-season entry Perfect Couples (later replaced by another mid-season entry The Paul Reiser Show –becoming Paul Reiser's starring vehicle after Mad About You–) and the return of Parks & Recreation. This lineup was discontinued in the fall of 2011, following the cancellations of Outsourced, Perfect Couples and The Paul Reiser Show due to low ratings and negative reception, when the night reverted to two hours of comedies and one drama and, in 2012, two hours of comedy and the news magazine Rock Center.

NBC Thursday two-hour comedy remained almost the same for the 2011–12 season, with the sitcom Whitney, the fall new show for the season, joining the returning comedies Community, The Office and Parks & Recreation. Meanwhile, 30 Rock returned to Thursdays at mid-season, when NBC moved from Wednesdays, the sitcom Up All Night, starring Christina Applegate on her second sitcom for the network after Jesse, taking over the timeslot of Whitney, which was eventually moved to Wednesdays and took over Up All Night timeslot.

==== "We Peacock Comedy" (2012–2013) ====
For the 2012–13 season, NBC renamed the Thursday comedy night as "We Peacock Comedy", however, that season experienced various fates: Up All Night being canceled at mid-season; and two of NBC's most successful and critically acclaimed shows from the 2000s ending their runs that season: The Office after nine seasons (which during its final two seasons experienced considerable decrease in quality and viewership –especially after Steve Carell left the series after its seventh season–), and 30 Rock after seven seasons (which despite the critical acclaim, the series struggled in the ratings throughout its run, and never ranked higher than 69th place in the yearly Nielsen ratings).

==== "NBC's Family of Comedies" and record ratings lows (2013–2014) ====
For the 2013–14 season, after The Office and 30 Rock ended their runs, NBC made an effort to broaden its comedy lineup. In May 2013, NBC picked up three family comedies (The Michael J. Fox Show –with Michael J. Fox returning to NBC after 24 years since the Family Ties finale–, Sean Saves the World and Welcome to the Family) and rebranded its Thursday night lineup as "NBC's New Family of Comedies" for that fall season. These new comedies joined the returning Parks & Recreation and critically acclaimed drama Parenthood, which also moved to Thursdays that season. The debut of The Michael J. Fox Show was the lowest-rated Thursday fall comedy series premiere in network history. One week later, the debut of Welcome to the Family became the new record-holder, with Sean Saves the World ranking as the second lowest ever. On October 10, 2013, NBC tied an all-time low on Thursday nights (tied with May 17, 2012), while finishing in fourth place (or combined with programming on Spanish-language network Univision, along with Thursday Night Football on NFL Network and Major League Baseball playoff coverage on TBS, seventh) for the night. On November 21, 2013, NBC averaged a 1.0 in the adults 18–49 age bracket, its lowest ever in-season average for regularly scheduled programming on the night. On the same night, The CW defeated the NBC comedy block, a first for the network. All three new shows were eventually canceled (Welcome to the Family was pulled three episodes into its first season, while The Michael J. Fox Show and Sean Saves the World were dropped shortly before the 2014 Winter Olympics; in the case of The Michael J. Fox Show, this was despite NBC giving a 22-episode order for the series prior to its debut), with Parks and Recreation and Community (the latter of which returned at mid-season), the only two sitcoms for the remainder of the 2013–14 season, which were joined by Hollywood Game Night, followed by Parenthood. At the end of the season, Community was canceled by NBC after five seasons, only to be renewed by Yahoo! Screen for its sixth and final season.

==== End of comedy programming (2014–16) ====
In May 2014, NBC announced their schedule for the upcoming 2014 fall season at upfronts, with only a single hour of Thursday comedy during the fall for the first time since 2005. Veteran reality show The Biggest Loser would take the 8pm slot, followed by new comedies Bad Judge and A to Z and the final season of Parenthood. They also announced the drama The Blacklist would take the 9pm slot at mid-season the week following the Super Bowl, hinting at the end of NBC's Thursday comedy tradition. In December 2014, NBC announced their mid-season schedule, with three dramas scheduled on Thursday to compete with ABC. This was the first time NBC had not aired comedies on Thursday since 1981, which put the "Must See TV" brand on hiatus for three years. The seventh and final season of Parks and Recreation was moved to Tuesday nights, possibly in an attempt to burn off the last 13 episodes. In May 2015, it was announced that NBC's Thursday broke into the Top 50 most-watched programming for the first time in five years, with The Blacklist being number 14. It was the night's best showing since The Office was in the Top 50 during the 2009–10 season.

Despite stiff competition from CBS and ABC, NBC Thursday night improved on ratings, however, the 2015–16 season was the first full season since the 1980–81 season in which no featured sitcoms at all. That season's lineup consisted on the miniseries Heroes Reborn, a continuation of the superhero drama series Heroes; The Blacklist and The Player. NBC Thursday lineup ended the season with The Blacklist ranked at 22nd, and a mid-season replacement Shades of Blue at 35th. Over at CBS, for that season, they used the same tactics NBC did for the last 34 years: form a two-hour comedy programming block, which includes four sitcoms, such as the hit comedies The Big Bang Theory and Mom, followed by one drama.

==== "Super Good Thursdays" and return of comedy programming (2016–17) ====
In May 2016, NBC announced the return of Thursday comedy for the 2016–17 season for the first time in two years, with the returning comedy Superstore and a new show to debut that fall: The Good Place, which marked the return of Ted Danson to NBC, after 23 years since the Cheers series finale; followed by Chicago Med and The Blacklist, earning continued success to the lineup. NBC also began to broadcast the second half of the Thursday Night Football season in a simulcast with NFL Network in November, effectively breaking those shows' seasons into half-seasons.

=== Second run (2017–2021) ===
In May 2017, NBC announced the return of the "Must See TV" branding, for the first time in eleven years, with the return of Will & Grace and the addition of the returning sitcom Great News, set to air on Thursdays for the 2017–18 season in addition to Superstore and The Good Place, all of them being followed by Chicago Fire. Outside of holiday specials for Will & Grace and Superstore, again all four shows had their seasons broken up by Thursday Night Football. Beginning with the 2018 NFL season, Thursday Night Football moved to Fox and eventually Amazon Prime Video, allowing NBC series to continue uninterrupted on Thursday nights aside from the traditional Thanksgiving and Christmas hiatuses. Despite NBC bringing back "Must See TV" and its two-hour comedy lineup on Thursdays, its performance struggled throughout the entire season, with CBS remaining as the number-one network on that night, with the continued success of The Big Bang Theory, Mom and the breakout hit Young Sheldon, followed by ABC with Grey's Anatomy continuing to perform well on the ratings, which were enough for both networks to outrate NBC's entire comedy lineup –Chicago Fire was the most successful show for the evening, ranking at 22nd in the Nielsens–.

Will & Grace, Superstore and The Good Place remained on the "Must See TV" Thursday lineup for the 2018–19 season, with Law & Order: Special Victims Unit taking over Chicago Fire timeslot; and a new comedy premiering that fall following the cancellation of Great News the previous season: I Feel Bad, which was canceled at mid-season and was replaced by Brooklyn Nine-Nine, which was renewed by NBC after being canceled by Fox after five seasons in the spring of 2018.

For the 2019–20 season, two new sitcoms premiered to join Superstore and The Good Place: the ultimately short-lived shows Perfect Harmony and Sunnyside, which were canceled at mid-season. Will & Grace returned for its eleventh and final season, before ending definitely in April 2020. The Good Place also ended its run after four seasons on the air.

For NBC's final season of "Must See TV", several changes were made for the 2020–21 season. The Thursday comedy night was shortened again to one hour, with Superstore joined by a new comedy Connecting, which was canceled after only four episodes, and was replaced by reruns of Superstore on its slot, until a brand new series, Mr. Mayor, entered the lineup in early 2021, co-created by 30 Rock's Tina Fey and starring Ted Danson on his third sitcom for NBC after Cheers and The Good Place; this was followed by Law & Order: Special Victims Unit and Dateline NBC. However, in February 2021, it was announced that NBC's Thursday night comedy block would be replaced by a block of drama shows (specifically the Law & Order franchise), with Superstore ending a six-season run; Mr. Mayor moving to Tuesdays for its second season; and Brooklyn Nine-Nine airing its eighth and final season during the summer. Shortly after, the "Must See TV" slogan disappeared for a second time on NBC.

== NBC Thursday night lineup history ==
Lime indicates the #1 most-watched program of the season.
Yellow indicates the top-10 most-watched programs of the season.
Cyan indicates the top-20 most watched programs of the season.
Magenta indicates the top-30 most watched programs of the season.
Orange indicates the top-40 most watched programs of the season.
Silver indicates the top-50 most watched programs of the season.

Year(s) / Season		8:00 PM	8:30 PM	9:00 PM	9:30 PM	10:00 PM	10:30 PM
Pre-Must See TV (1979–1982)
1979–1980	Fall	Buck Rogers in the 25th Century		Quincy M.E.		Kate Loves a Mystery	
1979–1980	Winter	Buck Rogers in the 25th Century		Quincy M.E.		Skag	
1979–1980	Spring	Buck Rogers in the 25th Century		Quincy M.E.		The Rockford Files	
1980–1981	Fall	Games People Play		NBC Thursday Night at the Movies			
1980–1981	Winter	Buck Rogers in the 25th Century		NBC Thursday Night at the Movies			
1980–1981	Spring	Buck Rogers in the 25th Century		NBC Thursday Night at the Movies			
1981–1982	Fall	Harper Valley	Lewis & Clark	Diff'rent Strokes	Gimme a Break!	Hill Street Blues	
1981–1982	Winter	Fame		Diff'rent Strokes	Gimme a Break!	Hill Street Blues	
1981–1982	Spring	Fame		Diff'rent Strokes	Gimme a Break!	Hill Street Blues	
"The Best Night of Television on Television" (1982–1993)
1982–1983	Fall	Fame		Cheers	Taxi	Hill Street Blues	
1982–1983	Winter	Fame		Gimme a Break!	Cheers	Hill Street Blues	
1982–1983	Spring	Fame		Gimme a Break!	Cheers	Hill Street Blues	
1983–1984	Fall	Gimme a Break!	Mama's Family	We Got It Made	Cheers	Hill Street Blues	
1983–1984	Winter	Gimme a Break!	Family Ties	Cheers	Buffalo Bill	Hill Street Blues	
1983–1984	Spring	Gimme a Break!	Family Ties	Cheers	The Duck Factory	Hill Street Blues	
1984–1985	Fall	The Cosby Show	Family Ties	Cheers	Night Court	Hill Street Blues	
1984–1985	Winter	The Cosby Show	Family Ties	Cheers	Night Court	Hill Street Blues	
1984–1985	Spring	The Cosby Show	Family Ties	Cheers	Night Court	Hill Street Blues	
1985–1986	Fall	The Cosby Show	Family Ties	Cheers	Night Court	Hill Street Blues	
1985–1986	Winter	The Cosby Show	Family Ties	Cheers	Night Court	Hill Street Blues	
1985–1986	Spring	The Cosby Show	Family Ties	Cheers	Night Court	Hill Street Blues	
1986–1987	Fall	The Cosby Show	Family Ties	Cheers	Night Court	Hill Street Blues	
1986–1987	Winter	The Cosby Show	Family Ties	Cheers	Night Court	L.A. Law	
1986–1987	Spring	The Cosby Show	Family Ties	Cheers	Nothing in Common	L.A. Law	
1987–1988	Fall	The Cosby Show	A Different World	Cheers	Night Court	L.A. Law	
1987–1988	Winter	The Cosby Show	A Different World	Cheers	Night Court	L.A. Law	
1987–1988	Spring	The Cosby Show	A Different World	Cheers	The Days and Nights of Molly Dodd	L.A. Law	
1988–1989	Fall	The Cosby Show	A Different World	Cheers	Dear John	L.A. Law	
1988–1989	Winter	The Cosby Show	A Different World	Cheers	Dear John	L.A. Law	
1988–1989	Spring	The Cosby Show	A Different World	Cheers	Dear John	L.A. Law	
1989–1990	Fall	The Cosby Show	A Different World	Cheers	Dear John	L.A. Law	
1989–1990	Winter	The Cosby Show	A Different World	Cheers	Grand	L.A. Law	
1989–1990	Spring	The Cosby Show	A Different World	Cheers	Wings	L.A. Law	
1990–1991	Fall	The Cosby Show	A Different World	Cheers	Grand	L.A. Law	
1990–1991	Winter	The Cosby Show	A Different World	Cheers	Wings	L.A. Law	
1990–1991	Spring	The Cosby Show	A Different World	Cheers	Seinfeld	L.A. Law	
1991–1992	Fall	The Cosby Show	A Different World	Cheers	Wings	L.A. Law	
1991–1992	Winter	The Cosby Show	A Different World	Cheers	Wings	L.A. Law	
1991–1992	Spring	The Cosby Show	A Different World	Cheers	Wings	L.A. Law	
1992–1993	Fall	A Different World	Rhythm & Blues	Cheers	Wings	L.A. Law	
1992–1993	Winter	Cheers (R)	Wings	Cheers	Seinfeld	L.A. Law	
1992–1993	Spring	Cheers (R)	Wings	Cheers	Seinfeld	L.A. Law	
Must See TV (1993–2006)
1993–1994	Fall	Mad About You	Wings	Seinfeld	Frasier	L.A. Law	
1993–1994	Winter	Mad About You	Wings	Seinfeld	Frasier	Homicide: Life on the Street	
1993–1994	Spring	Mad About You	Wings	Seinfeld	Frasier	L.A. Law	
1994–1995	Fall	Mad About You	Friends	Seinfeld	Madman of the People	ER	
1994–1995	Winter	Mad About You	Friends	Seinfeld	Madman of the People	ER	
1994–1995	Spring	Mad About You	Hope & Gloria	Seinfeld	Friends	ER	
1995–1996	Fall	Friends	The Single Guy	Seinfeld	Caroline in the City	ER	
1995–1996	Winter	Friends	The Single Guy	Seinfeld	Caroline in the City	ER	
1995–1996	Spring	Friends	Boston Common	Seinfeld	Caroline in the City	ER	
1996–1997	Fall	Friends	The Single Guy	Seinfeld	Suddenly Susan	ER	
1996–1997	Winter	Friends	The Single Guy	Seinfeld	The Naked Truth	ER	
1996–1997	Spring	Friends	Suddenly Susan	Seinfeld	Fired Up	ER	
1997–1998	Fall	Friends	Union Square	Seinfeld	Veronica's Closet	ER	
1997–1998	Winter	Friends	Just Shoot Me!	Seinfeld	Veronica's Closet	ER	
1997–1998	Spring	Friends	Just Shoot Me!	Seinfeld	Veronica's Closet	ER	
1998–1999	Fall	Friends	Jesse	Frasier	Veronica's Closet	ER	
1998–1999	Winter	Friends	Jesse	Frasier	Veronica's Closet	ER	
1998–1999	Spring	Friends	Will & Grace	Frasier	Veronica's Closet	ER	
1999–2000	Fall	Friends	Jesse	Frasier	Stark Raving Mad	ER	
1999–2000	Winter	Friends	Jesse	Frasier	Stark Raving Mad	ER	
1999–2000	Spring	Friends	Daddio	Frasier	Battery Park	ER	
2000–2001	Fall	Friends	Cursed	Will & Grace	Just Shoot Me!	ER	
2000–2001	Winter	Friends	Cursed	Will & Grace	Just Shoot Me!	ER	
2000–2001	Spring	Friends	Cursed	Will & Grace	Just Shoot Me!	ER	
2001–2002	Fall	Friends	Inside Schwartz	Will & Grace	Just Shoot Me!	ER	
2001–2002	Winter	Friends	Leap of Faith	Will & Grace	Just Shoot Me!	ER	
2001–2002	Spring	Friends	Friends (R)	Will & Grace	Just Shoot Me!	ER	
2002–2003	Fall	Friends	Scrubs	Will & Grace	Good Morning, Miami	ER	
2002–2003	Winter	Friends	Scrubs	Will & Grace	Good Morning, Miami	ER	
2002–2003	Spring	Friends	Scrubs	Will & Grace	Frasier (R)	ER	
2003–2004	Fall	Friends	Scrubs	Will & Grace	Coupling	ER	
2003–2004	Winter	Friends	Will & Grace	The Apprentice		ER	
2003–2004	Spring	Friends	Frasier	Will & Grace	Scrubs	ER	
2004–2005	Fall	Joey	Will & Grace	The Apprentice		ER	
2004–2005	Winter	Joey	Will & Grace	The Apprentice		ER	
2004–2005	Spring	Joey	Will & Grace	The Apprentice		ER	
2005–2006	Fall	Joey	Will & Grace	The Apprentice		ER	
2005–2006	Winter	Will & Grace	Four Kings	My Name Is Earl	The Office	ER	
2005–2006	Spring	Will & Grace	My Name Is Earl (R)	My Name Is Earl	The Office	ER	
Comedy Night Done Right (2006–2012)
2006–2007	Fall	My Name Is Earl	The Office	Deal or No Deal		ER	
2006–2007	Winter	My Name Is Earl	The Office	Scrubs	30 Rock	ER	
2006–2007	Spring	My Name Is Earl	The Office	30 Rock	Andy Barker, P.I.	ER	
2007–2008	Fall	My Name Is Earl	30 Rock	The Office	Scrubs	ER	
2007–2008	Winter^{1}	My Name Is Earl	The Office (R)	Celebrity Apprentice		ER	
2007–2008	Spring	My Name Is Earl	Scrubs	The Office	30 Rock	ER	
2008–2009	Fall	My Name Is Earl	Kath & Kim	The Office	30 Rock	ER	
2008–2009	Winter	My Name Is Earl	Kath & Kim	The Office	30 Rock	ER	
2008–2009	Spring	My Name Is Earl	Parks and Recreation	The Office	30 Rock	Southland	
2009–2010	Fall	Community	Parks and Recreation	The Office	30 Rock	The Jay Leno Show	
2009–2010	Winter	Community	Parks and Recreation	The Office	30 Rock	The Jay Leno Show	
2009–2010	Spring	Community	Parks and Recreation	The Office	30 Rock	The Marriage Ref	
2010–2011	Fall	Community	30 Rock	The Office	Outsourced	The Apprentice	
2010–2011	Winter	Community	Perfect Couples	The Office	Parks and Recreation	30 Rock	Outsourced
2010–2011	Spring	Community	The Paul Reiser Show	The Office	Parks and Recreation	30 Rock	Outsourced
2011–2012	Fall	Community	Parks and Recreation	The Office	Whitney	Prime Suspect	
2011–2012	Winter	30 Rock	Parks and Recreation	The Office	Up All Night	The Firm	
2011–2012	Spring	Community	30 Rock	The Office	Up All Night	Awake	
2011–2012	Spring	Community	30 Rock	The Office	Parks and Recreation	Awake	
"We Peacock Comedy" Thursdays (2012–2013)
2012–2013	Fall	30 Rock	Up All Night	The Office	Parks and Recreation	Rock Center with Brian Williams	
2012–2013	Winter	30 Rock	Parks and Recreation	The Office	1600 Penn	Rock Center with Brian Williams	
2012–2013	Spring	Community	Parks and Recreation	The Office	Go On	Hannibal	
NBC's Family of Comedies (2013–2014)
2013–2014	Fall	Parks and Recreation	Welcome to the Family	Sean Saves the World	The Michael J. Fox Show	Parenthood	
2013–2014	Winter	Community	Parks and Recreation	Sean Saves the World	The Michael J. Fox Show	Parenthood	
2013–2014	Spring	Community	Parks and Recreation	Hollywood Game Night		Parenthood	
Post-Must See TV (2014–2016)
2014–2015	Fall	The Biggest Loser: Glory Days		Bad Judge	A to Z	Parenthood	
2014–2015	Winter	The Slap		The Blacklist		Allegiance	
2014–2015	Spring	Dateline NBC		The Blacklist		The Slap	
2015–2016	Fall	Heroes Reborn		The Blacklist		The Player	
2015–2016	Winter	You, Me and the Apocalypse		The Blacklist		Shades of Blue	
2015–2016	Spring	Strong		The Blacklist		Game of Silence	
"Super Good" Thursdays (2016–2017)
2016–2017	Fall	Superstore	The Good Place	Chicago Med		The Blacklist	
2016–2017	Winter	Superstore	Powerless	Chicago Med		The Blacklist: Redemption	
2016–2017	Spring	Superstore (R)	Superstore	Chicago Med		The Blacklist	
Must See TV (second era, 2017–2021)
2017–2018	Fall	Superstore	The Good Place	Will & Grace	Great News	Chicago Fire	
2017–2018	Winter	Superstore	A.P. Bio	Will & Grace	Champions	Chicago Fire	
2017–2018	Spring	Superstore	A.P. Bio	Will & Grace	Champions	Chicago Fire	
2018–2019	Fall	Superstore	The Good Place	Will & Grace	I Feel Bad	Law & Order: Special Victims Unit	
2018–2019	Winter	The Titan Games		Brooklyn Nine-Nine	The Good Place	Law & Order: Special Victims Unit	
2018–2019	Spring	Superstore	A.P. Bio	Brooklyn Nine-Nine	Abby's	Law & Order: Special Victims Unit	
2019–2020	Fall	Superstore	Perfect Harmony	The Good Place	Sunnyside	Law & Order: Special Victims Unit	
2019–2020	Winter	Superstore	Brooklyn Nine-Nine	Will & Grace	Indebted	Law & Order: Special Victims Unit	
2019–2020	Spring	Council of Dads		Blindspot		Law & Order: Special Victims Unit	
2020–2021	Fall	Superstore	Connecting	Law & Order: Special Victims Unit		Dateline NBC	
2020–2021	Winter	Mr. Mayor	Superstore	Law & Order: Special Victims Unit		Dateline NBC	
2020–2021	Spring	Manifest		Law & Order: Special Victims Unit		Law & Order: Organized Crime	
Post-Must See TV (2021–present)
2021–2022	Fall	The Blacklist		Law & Order: Special Victims Unit		Law & Order: Organized Crime	
2021–2022	Winter	Law & Order		Law & Order: Special Victims Unit		Law & Order: Organized Crime	
2021–2022	Spring	Law & Order		Law & Order: Special Victims Unit		Law & Order: Organized Crime	
2022–2023	Fall	Law & Order		Law & Order: Special Victims Unit		Law & Order: Organized Crime	
2022–2023	Winter	Law & Order		Law & Order: Special Victims Unit		Law & Order: Organized Crime	
2022–2023	Spring	The Blacklist		Law & Order: Special Victims Unit		Magnum P.I. (R)	
2023–2024	Fall	Law & Order: Special Victims Unit (R)		Transplant		Dateline NBC	
2023–2024	Winter	Law & Order		Law & Order: Special Victims Unit		Law & Order: Organized Crime	
2023–2024	Spring	Law & Order		Law & Order: Special Victims Unit		Law & Order: Organized Crime	
2024–2025	Fall	Law & Order		Law & Order: Special Victims Unit		Found	
2024–2025	Winter	Law & Order		Law & Order: Special Victims Unit		Found	
2024–2025	Spring	Transplant		Law & Order: Special Victims Unit		Law & Order (R)	

^1 Because of the 2007–2008 Writers Guild of America strike, shows that would regularly air were replaced with reruns and unscripted programming. A few episodes of Deal or No Deal occupied the 8:00 p.m. time slot on Thursdays during the strike.

^2 During the second half of the 2014–15 season, The Slap initially occupied the 8:00 p.m. time slot; it was moved to the 10:00 p.m. time slot midway through its run after Allegiance was canceled.

== Other series and specials ==
Several series aired on Thursdays to take advantage of the huge audience. These series include:

- Night Court (summer 1984)
- Our House (September 11, 1986)
- Crime Story (September 18, 1986)
- The Tortellis (January 22, 1987)
- Roomies (March 19, 1987)
- The Bronx Zoo (March 19, 1987)
- The Days and Nights of Molly Dodd (summer 1987)
- Beverly Hills Buntz (November 5, 1987; December 24, 1987)
- Mama's Boy (November 26, 1987)
- Day by Day (March 3, 1988)
- My Two Dads (April 7, 1988)
- Dream Street (April 13, 1989)
- Tattingers (April 20, 1989)
- Baby Boom (July 13, 1989)
- FM (August 17, 1989, September 14, 1989, summer 1990)
- Sister Kate (September 21, 1989)
- Hardball (September 21, 1989)
- Mancuso, F.B.I. (October 19, 1989)
- Ann Jillian (November 30, 1989)
- Down Home (April 12, 1990; February 28, 1991)
- Seinfeld (summer 1990)
- Quantum Leap (summer 1990; June 27, 1991)
- Blossom (July 5, 1990; January 3, 1991)
- Ferris Bueller (August 23, 1990)
- Parenthood (September 6, 1990; repeat of pilot episode)
- Law & Order (September 13, 1990; October 4, 1990; October 11, 1990; June 2, 1994; spring 1997)
- American Dreamer (September 20, 1990)
- Sisters (summer 1991)
- The Adventures of Mark and Brian
- Dear John (September 19, 1991)
- Reasonable Doubts (September 26, 1991)
- The Torkelsons (January 9, 1992)
- Home Fires (June 25, 1992)
- Dateline NBC (October 8, 1992; July 29, 1993; March 31, 1994; June 16, 1994; June 30 – July 14, 1994; July 28 – August 11, 1994; August 25 – September 1, 1994; September 1, 2005)
- Mad About You (summer 1993, August 5, 1999)
- The Fresh Prince of Bel-Air (November 5, 1992)
- South Beach (August 12, 1993)
- First Person with Maria Shriver (August 26, 1993; July 21, 1994)
- seaQuest DSV (December 30, 1993)
- Sweet Justice (September 15, 1994)
- Prince Street (March 6, 1997)
- NewsRadio (August 3, 1995, June 1997)
- Men Behaving Badly (summer 1997: June 12, 1997)
- Suddenly Susan (summer 1998)
- 3rd Rock from the Sun (summer 1996, July 9, 1998, summer 1999, summer 2000)
- Working (August 20, 1998)
- Frasier (August 27, 1998, September 3, 1998)
- Just Shoot Me! (August 5, 1999, summer 2000)
- Will & Grace (c. spring-summer 2000)
- Las Vegas (July 8, 2004)
- Medical Investigation (September 9, 2004)
- Medium (January 6, 2005)

Specials that the network has aired on Thursdays to take advantage of the audience on that night:

- Michael Nesmith in Television Parts (March 7, 1985)
- Bigshots in America (June 20, 1985)
- Phil Donahue Examines the Human Animal (August 14, 1986)
- The Tonight Show Starring Johnny Carson: 24th Anniversary (September 25, 1986)
- Splitting Image: The 1987 Movie Awards (March 26, 1987)
- The Art of Being Nick (August 27, 1987)
- Act II (September 3, 1987)
- NBC Investigates Bob Hope (September 17, 1987)
- The Tonight Show Starring Johnny Carson: 25th Anniversary (October 1, 1987)
- Late Night with David Letterman: 6th Anniversary Show (February 4, 1988)
- Heart and Soul (July 21, 1988)
- Channel 99 (August 4, 1988)
- Stand by for HNN: The Hope News Network (September 8, 1988)
- The Tonight Show Starring Johnny Carson: 26th Anniversary (October 6, 1988)
- Late Night with David Letterman: 7th Anniversary Show (February 2, 1989)
- Jackee (May 11, 1989)
- The Tonight Show Starring Johnny Carson: 27th Anniversary (October 26, 1989)
- The Tonight Show Starring Johnny Carson: 28th Anniversary (September 27, 1990)
- The Tonight Show Starring Johnny Carson: 29th Anniversary (October 3, 1991)
- Bob Hope's Star-Studded Comedy Special of the New Season (September 1991)
- The Funny Women of Television (October 24, 1991)
- Late Night with David Letterman: 10th Anniversary Show (February 6, 1992)
- The Comedy Store's 20th Anniversary (September 24, 1992)
- A Spinal Tap Reunion (December 31, 1992)
- Hillary: America's First Lady (June 10, 1993)
- The Michael Jordan Special (August 5, 1993)
- The Seinfeld Story (November 25, 2004)

== Summer programming ==
Series airing on Thursday night during and after the run of "Must See TV" during the summer months have included Spy TV, Come to Papa, Last Comic Standing, Hit Me, Baby, One More Time, The Law Firm, Windfall and Love Bites.

== Ratings ==
- Highest Rated Episode in the 1990s: 84.0 million viewers (Cheers: Series Finale – "One for the Road"; May 1993; 9:22 p.m.-11:00 p.m. ET)
- Highest Rated Episode in the 2000s: 52.5 million viewers (Friends: Series Finale – "The Last One"; May 6, 2004; 9:00 p.m.-10:06 p.m. ET)
- Highest Rated Episode in the 2010s: 9.35 million viewers (The Office: Hour-long episode – "The Delivery"; March 4, 2010; 9:30 p.m.-10:00 p.m. ET)
- Highest Rated Episode of the line-up (Drama): 48.0 million viewers (ER: "Hell and High Water"; November 1995; 9:00 p.m.-10:00 p.m. ET)
- Highest Rated Episode of the line-up (Overall) and Peak viewership: 93.5 million viewers (Cheers: Series Finale; May 1993; 9:22 p.m.-11:00 p.m. ET)

Note: Friends's peak viewership in its 2004 series finale reached 80 million viewers as tallied by the Nielsen ratings (final 5 minutes).

== See also ==
- Thank God It's Thursday, a primetime Thursday branding on ABC in 2014
- TGIF, a primetime Friday branding on ABC from 1989 to 2005
- CBS Block Party, a primetime Friday branding on CBS from 1997 to 2000
