= 1980–81 United States network television schedule =

The following is the 1980–81 network television schedule for the three major English language commercial broadcast networks in the United States. The schedule covers primetime hours from September 1980 through August 1981. The schedule is followed by a list per network of returning series, new series, and series cancelled after the 1979–80 season. All times are Eastern and Pacific, with certain exceptions, such as Monday Night Football.

New series are highlighted in bold.

Each of the 30 highest-rated shows is listed with its rank and rating as determined by Nielsen Media Research.

Yellow indicates the programs in the top 10 for the season.
Cyan indicates the programs in the top 20 for the season.
Magenta indicates the programs in the top 30 for the season.

PBS is not included; member stations have local flexibility over most of their schedules and broadcast times for network shows may vary.

Note: An actors' strike hindered the ability to start airing shows in a timely manner. The shows in the schedule were the first to air new episodes in their respective time periods as they bowed in between late August and December 31, 1980. Some of the new shows intended for a fall launch did not debut until 1982 or 1983, if at all.

== Sunday ==
| Network | | 7:00 PM | 7:30 PM | 8:00 PM | 8:30 PM | 9:00 PM | 9:30 PM | 10:00 PM | 10:30 PM |
|---|---|---|---|---|---|---|---|---|---|
| ABC | Fall | **Those Amazing Animals** | | Local and paid political programming | | The ABC Sunday Night Movie (24/19.4) (Tied with CHiPs) | | | |
| ABC | November | **Those Amazing Animals** | | Charlie's Angels | | The ABC Sunday Night Movie (24/19.4) (Tied with CHiPs) | | | |
| ABC | Winter | **Those Amazing Animals** | | Charlie's Angels | | The ABC Sunday Night Movie (24/19.4) (Tied with CHiPs) | | | |
| ABC | Spring | **Those Amazing Animals** | | Specials | | The ABC Sunday Night Movie (24/19.4) (Tied with CHiPs) | | | |
| ABC | Summer | **Those Amazing Animals** | | Specials | | The ABC Sunday Night Movie (24/19.4) (Tied with CHiPs) | | | |
| CBS | | 60 Minutes (3/27.0) | | Archie Bunker's Place (13/21.4) | One Day at a Time (11/22.0) | Alice (7/22.9) | The Jeffersons (6/23.5) | Trapper John, M.D. (17/20.7) (Tied with Fantasy Island and Diff'rent Strokes) | |
| NBC | | Disney's Wonderful World | | CHiPs (24/19.4) (Tied with The ABC Sunday Night Movie) | | The Big Event | | | |

Note: On ABC, local and paid political programming aired in the 8-9 p.m. hour from September till November.

== Monday ==
| Network | | 8:00 PM | 8:30 PM | 9:00 PM | 9:30 PM | 10:00 PM | 10:30 PM |
|---|---|---|---|---|---|---|---|
| ABC | Fall | That's Incredible! (22/20.5) | | Monday Night Football (20/20.6) (Tied with Laverne & Shirley) | | | |
| ABC | Winter | That's Incredible! (22/20.5) | | **Dynasty** | | **Foul Play** | |
| ABC | Spring | That's Incredible! (22/20.5) | | **Dynasty** | | Soap | |
| ABC | Summer | Specials | Monday Night Baseball | | | | |
| CBS | Fall | Flo | **Ladies' Man** (Oct.) | M*A*S*H (4/25.7) | House Calls (8/22.4) (Tied with Three's Company) | Lou Grant (27/19.1) | |
| CBS | Winter | Flo | **Ladies' Man** (Oct.) | M*A*S*H (4/25.7) | House Calls (8/22.4) (Tied with Three's Company) | Lou Grant (27/19.1) | |
| CBS | Spring | **Private Benjamin** | **Ladies' Man** (Oct.) | M*A*S*H (4/25.7) | House Calls (8/22.4) (Tied with Three's Company) | Lou Grant (27/19.1) | |
| CBS | Follow-up | **Private Benjamin** | **The Two of Us** | M*A*S*H (4/25.7) | House Calls (8/22.4) (Tied with Three's Company) | Lou Grant (27/19.1) | |
| CBS | Summer | **Private Benjamin** | The Tim Conway Show | M*A*S*H (4/25.7) | House Calls (8/22.4) (Tied with Three's Company) | Lou Grant (27/19.1) | |
| NBC | Fall | Little House on the Prairie (10/22.1) | | NBC Monday Night at the Movies (29/18.8) | | | |
| NBC | Winter | Little House on the Prairie (10/22.1) | | NBC Monday Night at the Movies (29/18.8) | | | |
| NBC | Spring | Little House on the Prairie (10/22.1) | | NBC Monday Night at the Movies (29/18.8) | | | |
| NBC | Summer | Little House on the Prairie (10/22.1) | | **Flamingo Road** | | The Last Convertible | |

Note: Private Benjamin premiered April 6, 1981, at 8:00-8:30 pm on CBS.
Soap ran for three-and-a-half seasons on ABC in a 30-minute format. It was pulled from the Wednesday night schedule in January 1981 and returned on Mondays from March to April, when the final 12 episodes of the series ran as six 60-minute installments.

== Tuesday ==
| Network | | 8:00 PM | 8:30 PM | 9:00 PM | 9:30 PM | 10:00 PM | 10:30 PM |
|---|---|---|---|---|---|---|---|
| ABC | Fall | Happy Days (15/20.8) (Tied with Too Close for Comfort) | Laverne & Shirley (20/20.6) (Tied with Monday Night Football) | Three's Company (8/22.4) (Tied with House Calls) | **Too Close for Comfort** (Nov.) (15/20.8) (Tied with Happy Days) | Hart to Hart (23/19.9) | |
| ABC | Winter | Happy Days (15/20.8) (Tied with Too Close for Comfort) | Laverne & Shirley (20/20.6) (Tied with Monday Night Football) | Three's Company (8/22.4) (Tied with House Calls) | **Too Close for Comfort** (Nov.) (15/20.8) (Tied with Happy Days) | Hart to Hart (23/19.9) | |
| ABC | Spring | Happy Days (15/20.8) (Tied with Too Close for Comfort) | Laverne & Shirley (20/20.6) (Tied with Monday Night Football) | Three's Company (8/22.4) (Tied with House Calls) | **Too Close for Comfort** (Nov.) (15/20.8) (Tied with Happy Days) | Hart to Hart (23/19.9) | |
| ABC | Summer | Happy Days (15/20.8) (Tied with Too Close for Comfort) | Laverne & Shirley (20/20.6) (Tied with Monday Night Football) | Three's Company (8/22.4) (Tied with House Calls) | **It's a Living** | Hart to Hart (23/19.9) | |
| CBS | Fall | Local and paid political programming | | The CBS Tuesday Night Movies | | | |
| CBS | November | The White Shadow | | The CBS Tuesday Night Movies | | | |
| CBS | Winter | That's My Line | | The CBS Tuesday Night Movies | | | |
| CBS | Spring | Palmerstown, U.S.A. | | The CBS Tuesday Night Movies | | | |
| CBS | Summer | **Checking In** | Flo | The CBS Tuesday Night Movies | | | |
| NBC | Fall | NBC Tuesday Night at the Movies | | | | **The Steve Allen Comedy Hour** (Oct.) | |
| NBC | November | Lobo | | B. J. and the Bear | | **The Steve Allen Comedy Hour** (Oct.) | |
| NBC | Winter | Lobo | | B. J. and the Bear | | **Flamingo Road** | |
| NBC | Spring | Lobo | | **Nero Wolfe** | | **Flamingo Road** | |

Note: On CBS, local and paid political programming aired in the 8-9 p.m. hour between September and November. On NBC, NBC Tuesday Night at the Movies aired 8-10 p.m. from September till November.

== Wednesday ==
| Network | | 8:00 PM | 8:30 PM | 9:00 PM | 9:30 PM | 10:00 PM | 10:30 PM |
|---|---|---|---|---|---|---|---|
| ABC | Fall | Eight Is Enough | | Taxi | Soap | Vega$ | |
| ABC | Winter | Eight Is Enough | | Taxi | Soap | Vega$ | |
| ABC | Spring | **The Greatest American Hero** (Mar.) | | **Aloha Paradise** (Feb.) | | **American Dream** (May) | |
| ABC | Summer | Charlie's Angels | | The ABC Summer Movie | | | |
| ABC | Follow-up | Charlie's Angels | | Vega$ | | **Dynasty** | |
| CBS | | **Enos** (Nov.) | | The CBS Wednesday Night Movies | | | |
| NBC | Fall | Real People (12/21.5) | | Movie of the Week | | | |
| NBC | November | Real People (12/21.5) | | Diff'rent Strokes (17/20.7) (Tied with Fantasy Island and Trapper John, M.D.) | The Facts of Life (26/19.3) | Quincy, M.E. | |
| NBC | Winter | Real People (12/21.5) | | Diff'rent Strokes (17/20.7) (Tied with Fantasy Island and Trapper John, M.D.) | The Facts of Life (26/19.3) | Quincy, M.E. | |
| NBC | Spring | Real People (12/21.5) | | Diff'rent Strokes (17/20.7) (Tied with Fantasy Island and Trapper John, M.D.) | The Facts of Life (26/19.3) | Quincy, M.E. | |
| NBC | Summer | Real People (12/21.5) | | Diff'rent Strokes (17/20.7) (Tied with Fantasy Island and Trapper John, M.D.) | The Facts of Life (26/19.3) | Quincy, M.E. | |

Note: The Greatest American Hero debuted on March 18 at 8:00pm on ABC.

Note: NBC's Movie of the Week aired 9-11 p.m. between September and November.

Note: The Facts of Life Season 2 began on November 19 at 9:30 on NBC.

== Thursday ==
| Network | | 8:00 PM | 8:30 PM | 9:00 PM | 9:30 PM | 10:00 PM | 10:30 PM |
|---|---|---|---|---|---|---|---|
| ABC | Fall | Mork & Mindy | **Bosom Buddies** (Nov.) | Barney Miller | **It's a Living** (Oct.) | 20/20 | |
| ABC | Winter | Mork & Mindy | **Bosom Buddies** (Nov.) | Barney Miller | Taxi | 20/20 | |
| ABC | Spring | Mork & Mindy | **Bosom Buddies** (Nov.) | Barney Miller | Taxi | 20/20 | |
| ABC | Summer | Mork & Mindy | **Bosom Buddies** (Nov.) | Barney Miller | Taxi | 20/20 | |
| CBS | Fall | The Waltons (30/18.6) | | CBS Thursday Movie Special | | | |
| CBS | December | The Waltons (30/18.6) | | **Magnum, P.I.** (14/21.0) | | Knots Landing (28/19.0) | |
| CBS | Winter | The Waltons (30/18.6) | | **Magnum, P.I.** (14/21.0) | | Knots Landing (28/19.0) | |
| CBS | Spring | **Checking In** | **Park Place** | **Magnum, P.I.** (14/21.0) | | Knots Landing (28/19.0) | |
| CBS | Mid-spring | **Checking In** | **Park Place** | **Magnum, P.I.** (14/21.0) | | **Nurse** | |
| CBS | May | The Waltons (30/18.6) | | **Magnum, P.I.** (14/21.0) | | Knots Landing (28/19.0) | |
| CBS | Summer | The Waltons (30/18.6) | | **Magnum, P.I.** (14/21.0) | | Knots Landing (28/19.0) | |
| NBC | Fall | **Games People Play** | | NBC Thursday Night at the Movies | | | |
| NBC | Winter | Buck Rogers in the 25th Century | | NBC Thursday Night at the Movies | | | |
| NBC | Spring | Buck Rogers in the 25th Century | | NBC Thursday Night at the Movies | | | |
| NBC | Summer | Buck Rogers in the 25th Century | | NBC Thursday Night at the Movies | | | |

Note: CBS Thursday Movie Special aired 9-11 p.m. from September till the end of November. Magnum, P.I. had a 2-hour premiere on December 11, 1980.

== Friday ==
| Network | | 8:00 PM | 8:30 PM | 9:00 PM | 9:30 PM | 10:00 PM | 10:30 PM |
|---|---|---|---|---|---|---|---|
| ABC | Fall | Benson | **I'm a Big Girl Now** (Oct.) | The ABC Friday Night Movie | | | |
| ABC | Winter | Benson | **I'm a Big Girl Now** (Oct.) | The ABC Friday Night Movie | | | |
| ABC | Spring | Benson | **I'm a Big Girl Now** (Oct.) | The ABC Friday Night Movie | | | |
| ABC | Summer | Benson | **The Krypton Factor** | The ABC Friday Night Movie | | | |
| CBS | | The Incredible Hulk | | The Dukes of Hazzard (2/27.3) | | Dallas (1/34.5) | |
| NBC | Fall | NBC Friday Night at the Movies | | | | **NBC Magazine with David Brinkley** (Sep.) | |
| NBC | December | **Marie** | | **Number 96** | | **NBC Magazine with David Brinkley** (Sep.) | |
| NBC | Winter | **Harper Valley PTA** | Sanford | **Nero Wolfe** | | **NBC Magazine with David Brinkley** (Sep.) | |
| NBC | Follow-up | **Harper Valley PTA** | **The Brady Brides** | **Nero Wolfe** | | **NBC Magazine with David Brinkley** (Sep.) | |
| NBC | Spring | **Harper Valley PTA** | Sanford | **Nero Wolfe** | | **NBC Magazine with David Brinkley** (Sep.) | |
| NBC | Follow-up | **Harper Valley PTA** | Sanford | Specials | | **NBC Magazine with David Brinkley** (Sep.) | |
| NBC | Summer | **Harper Valley PTA** | **Comedy Theater** | Specials | | **NBC Magazine with David Brinkley** (Sep.) | |

Note: NBC Friday Night at the Movies aired 8-10 p.m. during October and November.

== Saturday ==
| Network | | 8:00 PM | 8:30 PM | 9:00 PM | 9:30 PM | 10:00 PM | 10:30 PM |
|---|---|---|---|---|---|---|---|
| ABC | Fall | Local and paid political programming | | The Love Boat (5/24.3) | | Fantasy Island (17/20.7) (Tied with Trapper John, M.D. and Diff'rent Strokes) | |
| ABC | November | **Breaking Away** | | The Love Boat (5/24.3) | | Fantasy Island (17/20.7) (Tied with Trapper John, M.D. and Diff'rent Strokes) | |
| ABC | Winter | Charlie's Angels | | The Love Boat (5/24.3) | | Fantasy Island (17/20.7) (Tied with Trapper John, M.D. and Diff'rent Strokes) | |
| ABC | Follow-up | 240-Robert | | The Love Boat (5/24.3) | | Fantasy Island (17/20.7) (Tied with Trapper John, M.D. and Diff'rent Strokes) | |
| ABC | Spring | Eight Is Enough | | The Love Boat (5/24.3) | | Fantasy Island (17/20.7) (Tied with Trapper John, M.D. and Diff'rent Strokes) | |
| CBS | Fall | WKRP in Cincinnati | The Tim Conway Show | The CBS Saturday Night Movies | | | |
| CBS | December | WKRP in Cincinnati | The Tim Conway Show | **Freebie and the Bean** | | **Secrets of Midland Heights** | |
| CBS | Follow-up | WKRP in Cincinnati | The Tim Conway Show | Flo | **Ladies' Man** | **Concrete Cowboys** | |
| CBS | Spring | WKRP in Cincinnati | Flo | **Concrete Cowboys** | | **Riker** | |
| CBS | Follow-up | **Enos** | | The CBS Saturday Night Movies | | | |
| NBC | Fall | **Barbara Mandrell and the Mandrell Sisters** (Nov.) | | NBC Saturday Night at the Movies | | | |
| NBC | Winter | **Barbara Mandrell and the Mandrell Sisters** (Nov.) | | **Walking Tall** | | **Hill Street Blues** | |
| NBC | Follow-up | **Barbara Mandrell and the Mandrell Sisters** (Nov.) | | **The Gangster Chronicles** | | **Hill Street Blues** | |
| NBC | Spring | **Barbara Mandrell and the Mandrell Sisters** (Nov.) | | B.J. and the Bear | | **Walking Tall** | |
| NBC | Summer | **Barbara Mandrell and the Mandrell Sisters** (Nov.) | | B.J. and the Bear | | **Games People Play** | |

Note: The CBS Saturday Night Movies aired 9-11 p.m. through the end of November.

== By network ==
=== ABC ===
**Returning Series**

- 20/20
- 240-Robert
- The ABC Friday Night Movie
- The ABC Sunday Night Movie
- Barney Miller
- Benson
- Charlie's Angels
- Eight Is Enough
- Fantasy Island
- Happy Days
- Hart to Hart
- Laverne & Shirley
- The Love Boat
- Monday Night Baseball
- Monday Night Football
- Mork & Mindy
- Soap
- Taxi
- That's Incredible!
- Three's Company
- Vega$

**New Series**

- **ABC Summer Movie**
- **Aloha Paradise** *
- **American Dream** *
- **Bosom Buddies**
- **Breaking Away**
- **Dynasty** *
- **Foul Play** *
- **The Greatest American Hero** *
- **The Krypton Factor** *
- **I'm a Big Girl Now**
- **Making a Living**
- **Those Amazing Animals**
- **Too Close for Comfort**

Not returning from 1979–80:

- The ABC Monday Night Movie
- Angie
- The Associates
- B.A.D. Cats
- Detective School
- Family
- Galactica 1980
- Goodtime Girls
- The Lazarus Syndrome
- A New Kind of Family
- Nobody's Perfect
- One in a Million
- Out of the Blue
- The Ropers
- Salvage 1
- Stone
- Tenspeed and Brown Shoe
- When the Whistle Blows

=== CBS ===
**Returning Series**

- 60 Minutes
- Alice
- Archie Bunker's Place
- Dallas
- The Dukes of Hazzard
- Flo
- House Calls
- The Incredible Hulk
- The Jeffersons
- Knots Landing
- Lou Grant
- M*A*S*H
- One Day at a Time
- Palmerstown, U.S.A.
- That's My Line
- The Tim Conway Show
- Trapper John, M.D.
- Walter Cronkite's Universe
- The Waltons
- The White Shadow
- WKRP in Cincinnati

**New Series**

- **Checking In** *
- **Concrete Cowboys** *
- **Enos**
- **Freebie and the Bean**
- **Ladies' Man**
- **Magnum, P.I.**
- **Nurse** *
- **Park Place** *
- **Private Benjamin** *
- **Riker** *
- **Secrets of Midland Heights**
- **The Two of Us** *

Not returning from 1979–80:

- The Bad News Bears
- Barnaby Jones
- Beyond Westworld
- Big Shamus, Little Shamus
- California Fever
- The Chisholms
- Hagen
- Hawaii Five-O
- The Last Resort
- Paris
- Phyl & Mikhy
- The Stockard Channing Show
- Struck by Lightning
- Universe
- Working Stiffs
- Young Maverick

=== NBC ===
**Returning Series**

- B.J. and the Bear
- The Big Event
- Buck Rogers in the 25th Century
- CHiPs
- Diff'rent Strokes
- Disney's Wonderful World
- The Facts of Life
- Little House on the Prairie
- Lobo
- NBC Monday Night at the Movies
- Quincy, M.E.
- Real People
- Sanford

**New Series**

- **Barbara Mandrell and the Mandrell Sisters**
- **The Brady Brides** *
- **Comedy Theater** *
- **Flamingo Road** *
- **Games People Play**
- **The Gangster Chronicles** *
- **Harper Valley PTA** *
- **Hill Street Blues** *
- **Marie**
- **NBC Magazine**
- **Number 96** *
- **Nero Wolfe** *
- **The Steve Allen Comedy Hour**
- **Walking Tall**

Not returning from 1979–80:

- The Big Show
- Eischied
- From Here to Eternity
- Good Time Harry
- Hello, Larry
- Here's Boomer
- Joe's World
- A Man Called Sloane
- Me and Maxx
- Kate Loves a Mystery
- Pink Lady
- The Rockford Files
- Skag
- Shirley
- United States

Note: The * indicates that the program was introduced in midseason.
