= Top-rated United States television programs of 1980–81 =

This table displays the top-rated primetime television series of the 1980–81 season as measured by Nielsen Media Research.

Rank	Program	Network	Rating
1	Dallas	CBS	34.5
2	The Dukes of Hazzard	CBS	27.3
3	60 Minutes	CBS	27.0
4	M*A*S*H	CBS	25.7
5	The Love Boat	ABC	24.3
6	The Jeffersons	CBS	23.5
7	Alice	CBS	22.9
8	House Calls	CBS	22.4
8	Three's Company	ABC	22.4
10	Little House on the Prairie	NBC	22.1
11	One Day at a Time	CBS	22.0
12	Real People	NBC	21.5
13	Archie Bunker's Place	CBS	21.4
14	Magnum, P.I.	CBS	21.0
15	Happy Days	ABC	20.8
15	Too Close for Comfort	ABC	20.8
17	Fantasy Island	ABC	20.7
17	Trapper John, M.D.	CBS	20.7
17	Diff'rent Strokes	NBC	20.7
20	Monday Night Football	ABC	20.6
20	Laverne & Shirley	ABC	20.6
22	That's Incredible!	ABC	20.5
23	Hart to Hart	ABC	19.9
24	ABC Sunday Night Movie	ABC	19.4
24	CHiPs	NBC	19.4
26	The Facts of Life	NBC	19.3
27	Lou Grant	CBS	19.1
28	Knots Landing	CBS	19.0
29	NBC Monday Night Movie	NBC	18.8
30	The Waltons	CBS	18.6
