= Comedy Theatre (disambiguation) =

Comedy Theatre may refer to:

== Buildings ==
- Comedy Theatre of Budapest, in Budapest, Hungary
- Comedy Theatre, Melbourne, in Melbourne, Australia
- Comedy Theatre (New York City), opened in 1909 and demolished in 1942
- ACME Comedy Theatre, near Hollywood, Los Angeles, California
- Harold Pinter Theatre in London, known as the Royal Comedy Theatre from 1881 to 1884 and as the Comedy Theatre from 1884 to 2011

== Television ==
- Comedy Theater, an American anthology television series broadcast in 1981
- Comedy Theatre (TV series), an American anthology television series broadcast in 1976 and 1979
