= Top-rated United States television programs of 1981–82 =

This table displays the top-rated primetime television series of the 1981–82 season as measured by Nielsen Media Research.

Rank	Program	Network	Rating
1	Dallas	CBS	28.4
2	60 Minutes	CBS	27.7
3	The Jeffersons	CBS	23.4
4	Three's Company	ABC	23.3
5	Alice	CBS	22.7
6	The Dukes of Hazzard	CBS	22.6
6	Too Close for Comfort	ABC	22.6
8	ABC Monday Night Movie	ABC	22.5
9	M*A*S*H	CBS	22.3
10	One Day at a Time	CBS	22.0
11	Monday Night Football	ABC	21.8
12	Archie Bunker's Place	CBS	21.6
13	Falcon Crest	CBS	21.4
14	The Love Boat	ABC	21.2
15	Hart to Hart	ABC	21.1
15	Trapper John, M.D.	CBS	21.1
17	Magnum, P.I.	CBS	20.9
18	Happy Days	ABC	20.6
19	Dynasty	ABC	20.2
20	Laverne & Shirley	ABC	19.9
21	Real People	NBC	19.7
22	ABC Sunday Night Movie	ABC	19.5
23	House Calls	CBS	19.2
24	The Facts of Life	NBC	19.1
24	Little House on the Prairie	NBC	19.1
26	The Fall Guy	ABC	19.0
27	Hill Street Blues	NBC	18.6
28	That's Incredible!	ABC	18.4
28	T.J. Hooker	ABC	18.4
30	Fantasy Island	ABC	18.3
