= Cyndy Garvey =

American television personality (born 1949)

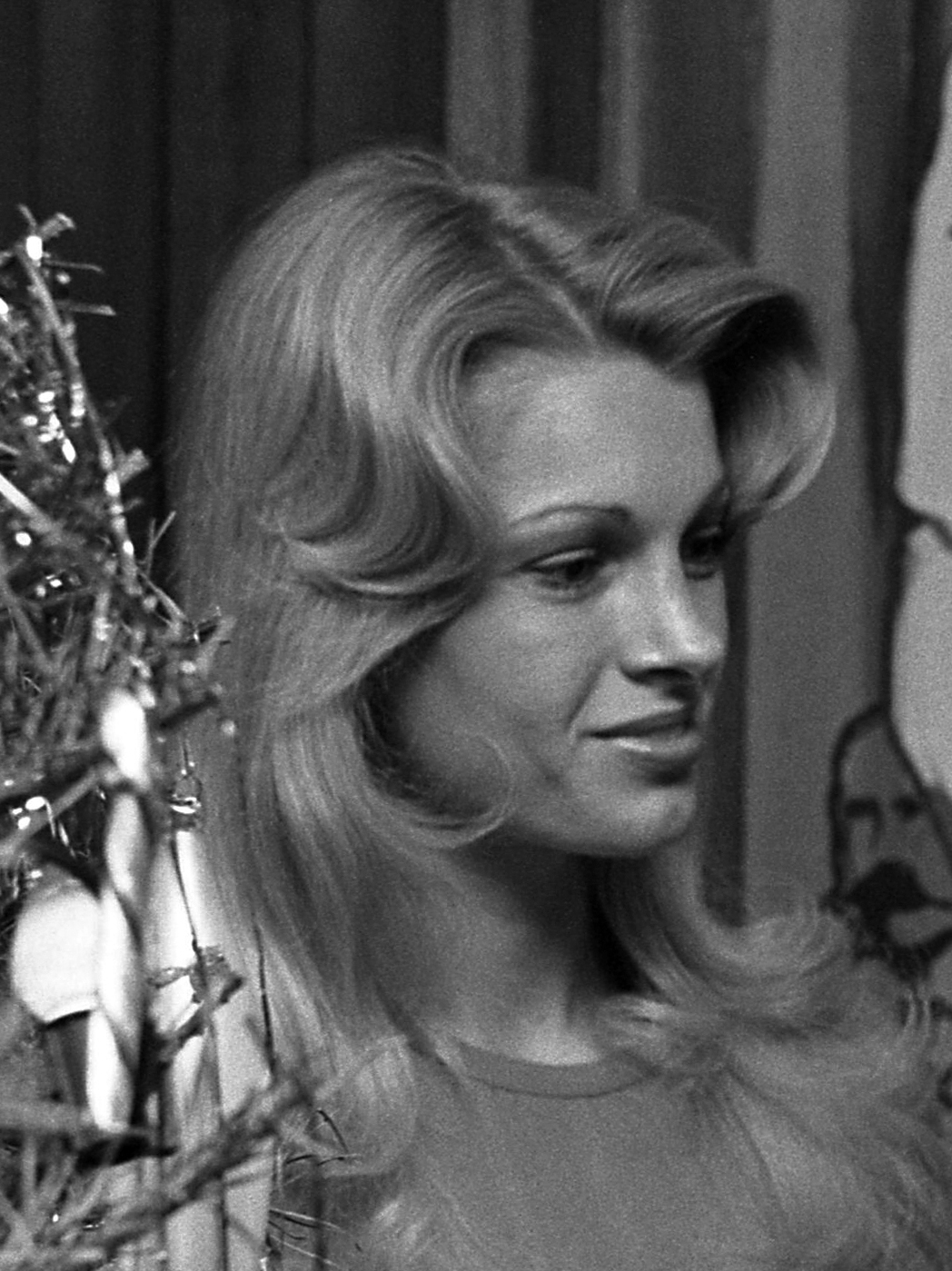
- Garvey in 1974
- Born: Cynthia Anne Truhan; July 16, 1949 (age 77); Detroit, Michigan, U.S.
- Occupation: Television personality
- Spouse: Steve Garvey (m. 1971; div. 1983)
- Children: 2

Cynthia Anne Garvey (née Truhan; born July 16, 1949) is an American television personality and the former wife of baseball player Steve Garvey.

== Career ==
Cyndy Garvey replaced Sarah Purcell as Regis Philbin's co-host of the local news/talk show A.M. Los Angeles on KABC-TV from 1978 to 1981. She is perhaps best known as being a co-host with Bryant Gumbel, of the novelty sports series Games People Play (1980). From 1983 to 1984, she was Regis Philbin's co-host on The Morning Show, on WABC-TV in New York City, the show which later became the nationally syndicated Live with Kelly and Mark. In 1986, she participated as a celebrity guest for two weeks on The $25,000 Pyramid.

== Personal life ==
She married Steve Garvey on October 27, 1971, and they had two daughters, Krisha and Whitney. Steve and Cyndy Garvey divorced in 1983.
