= Q.E.D. (American TV series) =

- Created by: John Hawkesworth; Robert Schlitt
- Starring: Sam Waterston
- Opening theme: Ken Howard; Alan Blaikley
- Ending theme: Ken Howard; Alan Blaikley
- Country of origin: United States
- No. of seasons: 1
- No. of episodes: 6

Production
- Running time: 60 minutes
- Production company: Consolidated Productions

Original release
- Network: CBS
- Release: March 23 – April 27, 1982

Q.E.D. is a 1982 adventure television series set in Edwardian England, starring Sam Waterston as Professor Quentin Everett Deverill. The Professor was a scientific detective in the mold of Sherlock Holmes, and the series had a smattering of what would later be called steampunk. In the show, the lead character was known primarily by his initials, Q.E.D; the reference here is that Q.E.D. usually stands for quod erat demonstrandum, a statement signalling the end of a proof. However, characters would sometimes state the initials to represent "quite easily done".

The series was broadcast during March and April, 1982 on the CBS television network in the United States, and by a variety of ITV companies in the United Kingdom.

== Characters ==
- Prof. Quentin E. Deverill (Sam Waterston)
- Phipps (George Innes)
- Charlie Andrews (A.C. Weary)
- Betsy Stephens (Sarah Berger; episode 1 only)
- Jenny Martin (Caroline Langrishe; episodes 2–6 only)
- Dr. Stefan Kilkiss (Julian Glover; episodes 1, 2 and 4 only)

== Episodes ==
| No. | Title | Original release date |
|---|---|---|
| 1 | "Target: London" | March 23, 1982 |
| 2 | "The Great Motor Race" | March 30, 1982 |
| 3 | "Infernal Device" | April 6, 1982 |
| 4 | "The 4:10 to Zurich" | April 13, 1982 |
| 5 | "To Catch a Ghost" | April 20, 1982 |
| 6 | "The Limehouse Connection" | April 27, 1982 |
