= Lewis & Clark (TV series) =

- Guich Koock (left) and Gabe Kaplan as Lewis and Clark
- Genre: Sitcom
- Created by: Gabe Kaplan
- Written by: Hank Bradford; Richard Gurman; Gabe Kaplan
- Starring: Gabe Kaplan; Guich Koock; Ilene Graff; Aaron Fletcher; Wendy Holcombe; Clifton James; Amy Linker; David Hollander; Michael McManus
- Country of origin: United States
- Original language: English
- No. of seasons: 1
- No. of episodes: 13

Production
- Executive producers: George Shapiro; Tom Tenowich
- Producer: Ed Scharlach
- Camera setup: Multi-camera
- Running time: 25 mins.
- Production company: Carson Productions

Original release
- Network: NBC
- Release: October 29, 1981 – July 30, 1982

Lewis & Clark is an American sitcom television series that aired on NBC for one season; it premiered on October 29, 1981, but was pulled from the schedule after eight episodes, with the final five episodes burned off in July 1982. The series stars Gabe Kaplan (who also created the series) and Guich Koock. The series was produced by Carson Productions and it was distributed by Columbia Pictures Television.

== Plot ==
For a native New Yorker, Stewart Lewis has a strange – some would say twisted – ambition: he wants to own a country-music club. His wife and kids hate the idea. Despite their misgivings, Stewart moves his family to Luckenbach, Texas, where he buys the Nassau County Cafe, a joint that has had nine owners in the last six years and sports a sign that says "Always Under New Management". While his sidekick Roscoe Clark stands by, Stewart lets fly one-liners and bad puns.

== Cast ==
- Gabe Kaplan as Stewart Lewis
- Guich Koock as Roscoe Clark
- Ilene Graff as Alicia Lewis
- David Hollander as Keith Lewis
- Wendy Holcombe as Wendy
- Clifton James as Silas Jones
- Amy Linker as Kelly Lewis
- Michael McManus as John

== Reception ==
The series was intended to be a comeback vehicle for Kaplan after the cancellation of the popular series Welcome Back, Kotter. Ratings for the series, however, were low and NBC canceled the series in January 1982 after eight episodes. The remaining five episodes were burned off in July 1982.

== Broadcast history ==
The first four episodes aired Thursdays at 8:30-9:00 on NBC. The next four episodes aired Saturdays at 9:30-10:00. The last five episodes aired Fridays at 8:00-8:30.

== Episodes ==
No.	Title	Written by	Original release date
1	"Welcome to Luckenbach"	Gabe Kaplan, Marc Sheffler	October 29, 1981
Stewart aims to fire the saloon manager, Roscoe Clark.
2	"Opposites Attract"	Ed Scharlach, Tom Tenowich	November 5, 1981
Roscoe falls for Alicia's friend, a fashion model from Paris.
3	"The Horse's Tale"	Richard Gurman	November 12, 1981
Stu does not know what to tell Roscoe when his prize-winning rodeo horse dies — with Stu in the saddle.
4	"Alicia's New York Night"	Hank Bradford	November 19, 1981
Roscoe turns the club into a slice of the Big Apple when Stu and Alicia have to cancel their trip to New York for their wedding anniversary.
5	"The Uptight End"	Gabe Kaplan	December 12, 1981
Stu is the host of a luncheon for a Heisman trophy candidate (Lawrence Hilton-Jacobs). Robert Hegyes also guest-stars.
6	"The Family Affair"	Richard Gurman	December 19, 1981
Roscoe's father aims to remarry, but when Roscoe learns of the woman's past, he's dead set against it.
7	"Your Cheatin' Heart"	Laura Levine	December 26, 1981
Roscoe suspects Stu and Wendy are having an affair.
8	"Oil!"	Hank Bradford, Richard Gurman	January 2, 1982
A millionaire (Jay Garner) wants to buy Stu's club, believing it sits on top of a gusher.
9	"Dear John"	Jerry Ross	July 2, 1982
10	"Friends"	Gabe Kaplan	July 9, 1982
Kelly has to choose between her best friend and the girls on the cheerleading squad.
11	"Yellow Stu of Texas"	Bob Baublitz	July 16, 1982
Stu gets pressed into a public match with Silas after Keith loses a fight to Silas's son.
12	"In Charm's Way"	Alan Myerson	July 23, 1982
Roscoe's feelings are hurt when Stu tells him he is spending too much time around the Lewis house.
13	"Tex Hex"	*	July 30, 1982
The crew at the Nassau County Cafe gets to perform when they lend the bar to a disc jockey for a live radio broadcast.

* Unknown

== Production notes ==
The series was created by series star Gabe Kaplan, and produced by Johnny Carson's Carson Productions.

The series featured an episode with guest appearances by Robert Hegyes and Lawrence Hilton-Jacobs, who were two of Kaplan's co-stars on Welcome Back, Kotter. At one point during the episode, Hegyes' character tells Lewis, "You should have been a teacher."
