= Jokebook =

- Genre: Comedy
- Directed by: William Hanna; Joseph Barbera
- Composer: Hoyt Curtin
- Country of origin: United States
- No. of episodes: 7 (4 unaired)

Production
- Producers: William Hanna; Joseph Barbera
- Running time: 22 minutes
- Production company: Hanna-Barbera Productions

Original release
- Network: NBC
- Release: April 23 – May 7, 1982

Jokebook is an American adult animated comedy series produced by Hanna-Barbera Productions. It aired on NBC for three episodes from April 23 to May 7, 1982.

== Format ==
The series' theme song was sung by Scatman Crothers.

Jokebook was an anthology of segments produced by Hanna-Barbera, along with classic, foreign, and independent animation that had originated elsewhere. Unusual for a Hanna-Barbera production, it was aimed at an adult audience (the first Hanna-Barbera production to be so after The Flintstones and Top Cat started being shown on Saturday mornings (which the film adaptation of a Hanna-Barbera property later aimed at an adult audience in The Banana Splits Movie)). It was the only Hanna-Barbera production not to have recurring characters. The show was aired with a laugh track and was the last Hanna-Barbera series to do so.

Seven episodes were made, but only three were aired due to lack of audience interest. The show's second episode finished last in the week's ratings. It aired at the same time as The Dukes of Hazzard on CBS and Benson on ABC.
