= Wendy Holcombe =

American banjo player and singer

Wendy Lou Holcombe (April 19, 1963 – February 14, 1987) was an American banjo player and singer.

Holcombe was born in Alabaster, Alabama and began playing the banjo at age eleven.

As a child, Holcombe was featured on the first episode of PBS's Big Blue Marble in 1974, NBC's The Big Show the Country Boy Eddy Show, and later, in 1977, The New Mickey Mouse Club, and was featured on Kids are People Too.

At the age of twelve, she was a regular performer on the television program Nashville on the Road.

Holcombe performed at the Grand Ole Opry and on the Eddie Rabbitt Show. As well as the banjo she also played the fiddle, dobro, steel guitar, and bass.

Holcombe toured throughout the United States, singing and playing the banjo, including The Strip in Las Vegas. She performed at Wembley Festival in London, England. She also appeared regularly on the show Nashville Swing, and recorded a television special, Wendy Hooper, US Army that aired on NBC in 1981, as well as on the sitcom Lewis & Clark in the 1981–82 season. She frequently performed duets and comedy sketches with Buck Trent, and the pair were nominated for a Music City Award.

Holcombe died of a congenital heart defect at the age of 23.
