= The Tim Conway Show (1980 TV series) =

US variety program (1980–81)

- The Tim Conway Show title card
- Genre: Variety/Sketch comedy
- Starring: Tim Conway
- Country of origin: United States
- Original language: English
- No. of seasons: 2

Production
- Producer: Joe Hamilton
- Running time: 60 minutes (March–May 1980); 30 minutes (September 1980-March 1981)

Original release
- Network: CBS
- Release: March 22, 1980 – March 7, 1981

The Tim Conway Show – the second of two television series of the name – is a 1980–1981 American variety/sketch comedy television show starring Tim Conway. It aired on CBS from March 22, 1980 to May 17, 1980, and from September 20, 1980 to March 7, 1981.

== Regulars ==
- Tim Conway
- Eric Boardman (1980)
- Jack Riley (1980)
- Maggie Roswell
- Miriam Flynn
- Dick Orkin (1980-1981)
- Bert Berdis (1980-1981)
- Harvey Korman (1981)
- The Peter Matz Orchestra
- The Don Crichton Dancers
- The Artie Malvin Singers

== Production ==
Despite his success as a member of the cast of the situation comedy McHale's Navy from 1962 to 1966 and in two theatrical films spun off from the series, McHale's Navy in 1964 and McHale's Navy Joins the Air Force in 1965, as well as his popularity during several years as a regular on The Carol Burnett Show in the 1970s, Tim Conway had found no success starring in a television show of his own. His situation comedies Rango in 1967 and The Tim Conway Show in the spring of 1970, as well as a fall 1970 comedy-variety series, The Tim Conway Comedy Hour, had all been cancelled after short runs. In March 1980, Conway made yet another attempt at a show of his own with a second comedy-variety series titled – like his 1970 situation comedy – The Tim Conway Show.

The series was produced by Carol Burnett's husband, Joe Hamilton, and closely followed the format of The Carol Burnett Show — a small group of regulars performing comedy sketches, interspersed with musical numbers, and supplemented by occasional guest stars — in which Conway had thrived for several years. His Carol Burnett Show co-stars Carol Burnett, Vicki Lawrence, and Harvey Korman all made guest appearances, and the orchestra, The Peter Matz Orchestra, was the same one that had performed on The Carol Burnett Show from 1971 to 1978. Unusually, the show's regular dance troupe, The Don Crichton Dancers (led by Crichton, the lead dancer on The Carol Burnett Show, and choreographer on its short-lived revival Carol Burnett & Company) was composed entirely of children between the ages of 8 and 13. Another portion of the show featured Tim recruiting members of the audience to join him onstage and perform sketches with him.

The Tim Conway Show premiered in a one-hour format on March 22, 1980, but ratings were disappointing (though this was increasingly true of virtually all variety shows of the era, which were falling out of fashion), and it left the air after the broadcast of May 17, 1980. Regulars Eric Boardman and Jack Riley left the show. When it returned on September 20, 1980, it had been reduced to 30 minutes in length. Ratings remained low, and in early 1981 Bert Berdis and Dick Orkin were dropped from the cast and Harvey Korman, with whom Conway had enjoyed an excellent comedic chemistry during sketches together on The Carol Burnett Show, joined the program as a co-host for the last several episodes. The series finale aired March 7, 1981. Reruns then aired through the summer.

The Tim Conway Show appeared on CBS throughout its run. During its initial March–May 1980 run as a one-hour program, it aired at 8:00 p.m. Eastern Time on Saturday. When it returned in its new 30-minute format in September 1980, it aired at 8:00 p.m. Saturday, moving to 8:30 p.m. Saturday in November 1980, where it remained until the end of its run in March 1981. In June 1981, CBS began broadcasting reruns of the 30-minute episodes at 8:30 p.m. on Monday; these continued until August 31, 1981, when the show left the air for good.

Despite its failure in the ratings, The Tim Conway Show would prove to be the longest-lived of the shows featuring Conway as their star. He would return to television in 1983 in the situation comedy Ace Crawford, Private Eye, but it was destined to last only a month.

Reruns of The Tim Conway Show, along with The Tim Conway Comedy Hour, were added to Stirr's lineup in 2021, through a licensing deal with Shout! Factory.
