= Park Place (TV series) =

- Created by: Reinhold Weege
- Starring: Harold Gould; Lionel Smith; Mary Elaine Monti; James Widdoes
- Composer: Jack Elliott
- Country of origin: United States
- Original language: English
- No. of seasons: 1
- No. of episodes: 5 (1 unbroadcast)

Production
- Camera setup: Multi-camera
- Running time: 30 minutes
- Production companies: Starry Night Productions; Warner Bros. Television

Original release
- Network: CBS
- Release: April 9 – April 30, 1981

Park Place is an American sitcom that aired on CBS from April 9 to April 30, 1981. Five episodes were produced, but only four were broadcast.

== Premise ==
A legal-aid clinic in Manhattan full of young lawyers and their sage directors, the clinic took cases based on a "take a number" method.

== Cast ==
- Harold Gould as David Ross
- Lionel Smith as Mac
- Mary Elaine Monti as Jo
- James Widdoes as Brad
- Don Calfa as Howie
- David Clennon as Jeff
- Alan Drummond as Frances
- Cal Gibson as Ernie

== Episodes ==
No.	Title	Directed by	Written by	Original release date
1	"Pilot"	Peter Bonerz	Reinhold Weege	April 9, 1981
A woman murders her husband because he wasn't happy with the dinner she made.
2	"Benign Neglect"	Jeff Melman	Tom Reeder	April 16, 1981
A teenager wants to be separated from her parents.
3	"Marooned"	Peter Bonerz	Reinhold Weege	April 23, 1981
A blizzard traps the staff at work overnight.
4	"Crazy Judge"	Asaad Kelada	Reinhold Weege	April 30, 1981
The lawyers are sent to jail for contempt of court.
5	"Revenge"	Peter Bonerz	Reinhold Weege	n/a
The office deals with a hooker, an eviction notice, and a nut who claims to be 137.
