= Comedy Theater =

American television anthology series

- Genre: Anthology series
- Country of origin: United States
- Original language: English
- No. of seasons: 1
- No. of episodes: 6

Production
- Running time: 30 minutes

Original release
- Network: NBC
- Release: July 17 – August 28, 1981

Comedy Theater is an American anthology television series that aired on NBC in the summer of 1981. The 30-minute episodes consisted of unsold television pilots for situation comedies.

== Background ==
The practice of television executives of ordering dozens of pilots for proposed television series each year – far more than their networks could possibly broadcast as series – created a sizable body of unsold pilots that had never aired. Packaging these unsold pilots in anthology series and airing them during the summer provided television networks with a way of both providing fresh programming during the summer rerun season and recouping at least some of the expense of producing them. Comedy Theater was one of these series, aired by NBC in the summer of 1981, and it consisted of unsold pilots for situation comedies. Stars appearing in the series included Ted Danson, Tony Lo Bianco, and Jeffrey Tambor.

== Broadcast history ==
Comedy Theater ran for seven episodes over the course of seven consecutive weeks in the summer of 1981, airing on NBC from 8:30 to 9:00 p.m. Eastern Time on Friday evenings. It premiered on July 17, and its last episode aired on August 28.

== Episodes ==
No. in season	Title	Directed by	Written by	Original release date
1	"Dear Teacher"	Herbert Kenwith	John Baskin & Roger Shulman	July 17, 1981
After a fifth-grade teacher begins dating the man of her dreams, she learns that he is the father of her most precocious and troublesome student. Starring Melinda Culea, Rebecca York, Ted Danson, Nan Martin, John Welsh, and David Hollander.
2	"The Grady Nutt Show"	Jack Shea	Barry Adelman, John Aylesworth, & Barry Silver	July 24, 1981
A Christian pastor in a small town has a sense of humor, and it helps him solve a variety of problems. Starring Grady Nutt, Elinor Donohue, Candy Azzara, Peggy Pope, Deborah Foreman, and Michael Dudikoff.
3	"Pals"	Bob Claver	Larry Rosen & Larry Tucker	July 31, 1981
When a man and his hapless brother-in-law visit Mexico to buy a painting, they get arrested for stealing a chicken and destroying religious artifacts. Starring Tony Lo Bianco, Jeffrey Tambor, Woodrow Parfey, Nedra Volz, Luis Avalos, Linda Carlson, and Margaret Willock.
4	"Wendy Hooper, U.S. Army"	Jack Shea	John Aylesworth & Aaron Reuben	August 14, 1981
A banjo-playing entertainer hoping to make it big in country and western music joins the United States Army Signal Corps in the mistaken belief that it will help launch her show business career. Starring Wendy Holcombe, Joe Santos, Dana Elcar, Norman Alden, Helen Page Camp, and June Berry.
5	"Why Us?"	John Bowab	Brad Buckner & Eugenie Ross-Leming	August 21, 1981
After a female auto mechanic and a professor at the University of California, Los Angeles (U.C.L.A.) get married, their teenage daughters compete for the attention of a handsome college student. Starring Joanna Gleason, John Lawlor, Kim Richards, Lauri Hendler, and Lance Guest.
6	"National Lampoon's Two Reelers"	Kenneth Gilbert	Matty Simmons & Hugh Snyder	August 28, 1981
While on vacation in Central America, two bumbling American college students become involved in a local revolution and end up helping to take a coffee shop and its waitress hostage. Starring Stephen Furst, Rodger Bumpass, and Penny Peyser.
