= Riker (TV series) =

American television series

- Genre: Crime drama
- Created by: Jerry Ludwig
- Country of origin: United States
- Original language: English
- No. of seasons: 1
- No. of episodes: 5

Production
- Running time: 60 minutes
- Production companies: Columbia Pictures Television; David Gerber Productions

Original release
- Network: CBS
- Release: March 14 – April 11, 1981

Riker is an American crime drama television series that aired from March 14 until April 11, 1981.

== Premise ==
A cop is forced to quit after a scandal and takes a job for the attorney general's office.

== Cast ==
- Josh Taylor as Frank Riker
- Michael Shannon as Brice Landis

== Episodes ==
No.	Title	Directed by	Written by	Original release date
1	"Honkytonk"	Sutton Roley	Rogers Turrentine	March 14, 1981
Riker investigates extortion threats at a nightclub owned by the family of an old girlfriend (Elyssa Davalos). Guest stars include Dane Clark, Kaz Garas, L.Q. Jones, and Ed Begley Jr.
2	"Sisters"	Lewis Teague	Robert Crais	March 21, 1981
Riker helps a woman locate her sister, who may be working as a prostitute for a pimp.
3	"Gun Run"	E. Arthur Kean	Will Lorin	March 28, 1981
A gang specializing in heisting government munitions hires Riker as a truck driver.
4	"Crime School"	Bob Kelljan	Sean Baine	April 4, 1981
Riker goes undercover in a prison to bust a "school" that teaches criminal techniques to inmates.
5	"Busted Cop"	Bob Kelljan	Jerry Ludwig	April 11, 1981
