= The Krypton Factor (American game show) =

- Genre: Game show
- Based on: The Krypton Factor by Jeremy Fox
- Presented by: Dick Clark (ABC); Willie Aames (syndication)
- Narrated by: John Harlan (ABC); Lara Cody (syndication)
- Country of origin: United States
- Original language: English

Production
- Running time: 22 minutes
- Production companies: MCA Television Enterprises; Alan Landsburg Productions (ABC); Kushner-Locke Productions; Western International (syndication)

Original release
- Network: ABC
- Release: August 7 – September 4, 1981
- Network: Syndication
- Release: September 15, 1990 – September 7, 1991

The Krypton Factor is an American game show based on the UK series of the same name. Contestants on the program were tested on their mental ability and physical skill.

The series had two separate runs. The first was a five-week limited series that aired on ABC from August 7 to September 4, 1981. The second was a weekly syndicated series that premiered on September 15, 1990 and ran until September 7, 1991.

The original Krypton Factor was produced by Alan Landsburg Productions in association with MCA Television Enterprises and was hosted by Dick Clark. The revival was produced by Kushner-Locke Productions and distributed by Western International, with Willie Aames hosting. The revival was originally produced by Scottish Television subsidiary MAC III Productions and it was originally going to be syndicated by G2 Entertainment.

== Gameplay ==
=== 1981 ===
Sixteen contestants competed in this five-week series, with four contestants competing in each of the first four matches and the winners of those four matches returning for the Krypton Final at the end of the series. In this adaptation, a player's score was called their "Krypton Factor," as was the case on the original UK version.

==== Phase I—Reflex Speed ====
Each player took turns playing a video game challenge where either a certain score had to be achieved within a certain time limit or the player had to stay in play for a certain amount of time. Each successful player scored five points. The games used in this round were adaptations of early Atari 2600 cartridges, such as Dodge 'Em, Outlaw, and Space Invaders; each episode featured a different game challenge.

==== Phase II—Mental Agility ====
In this round, each contestant wore headphones so only they could hear their questions. Each player in-turn was given two mental agility tests, each of which required them to mentally manipulate a series of letters, numbers, or words in a specific way. For example, a player could be asked to repeat a list of names in the reverse order they were read, or be asked to provide the end result of a long series of arithmetic operations. Only the home viewers can see the answers, while the audience in the studio can't and must remain silent, according to Clark. The first sequence, consisting of five items, was worth four points, and the second sequence, containing six items, was worth six points. If anytime any player made a mistake, they had to sit out the rest of the round. A possible total of ten points can be earned in this phase.

==== Phase III—Physical Ability ====
This round featured an obstacle course run that was pretaped in advance. Unlike the UK version, the course was designed to be fair to both men and women, so neither sex or age received a head start. The race began with a death slide into an inflatable mat, then players had to cross a pontoon bridge, crawl through tubes, drive a motor vehicle, ride a swing in order to kick down a door, and complete the course by walking in an inflatable wheel. The contestants earned points according to how they finished.

- Scoring was as follows:
  - 1st Place: 20 points
  - 2nd Place: 15 points
  - 3rd Place: 10 points
  - 4th Place: 5 points

==== Phase IV—Observation ====
In the fourth round, the players were tested on memory. They were shown a scene from a current motion picture, and each player was asked a four-point question pertaining to visual or verbal detail with two possible answers and a six-point question requiring them to recall specific dialogue. Then all players were shown a lineup of six similar-looking actors, one of whom had a key part in the film clip. Each player separately locked in their guess as to the correct actor, and each player who identified the correct actor earned ten points. A possible total of 20 points can be earned in this phase.

==== Phase V—General Knowledge ====
In the final round, the contestants were asked a series of general knowledge toss-up questions in which each correct answer would usually segue to the next question. Players did not have to wait until the question was fully read to jump in, but only the first player to do so got to answer. Each correct answer was worth two points, but each incorrect answer was worth minus two points, with the values doubling to +/-4 points midway through the round.

The player with the most points at the end of the competition won $5,000, plus an invitation to the final week to compete against the other weekly winners for $50,000. The show advertised that the prize would be in gold, but the series winner was given the option of taking the $50,000 prize in gold or in cash, and chose the cash. The series' winner was Joey Helman, an attorney from Los Angeles. He and the first runner-up, Joel Lewin, a physical fitness consultant from San Leandro, California, competed on The Krypton Factor International, a special edition of the original British version airing December 30, 1981, against the 1981 UK champion, John McAllister, and first runner-up, Peter Rimmer. This special was to be filmed on the U.S. set, but instead filmed on the original Manchester set since the U.S. set had been torn down. Rimmer won the International special.

=== 1990 ===
When the show returned, it stayed the same except there were four rounds and the contestants were now teenagers. Two girls and two boys competed in each episode. This was similar to the British spin-off Young Krypton.

Prior to this version, a pilot was taped in 1989 produced by G2 Entertainment in association with Granada Television International and A Mac III Production hosted by Pat Haden.

==== Round 1—Intelligence ====
Each player was shown a picture pertaining to a specific category, and had ten seconds to identify the subject of the picture for ten points. Afterward, three toss-up questions were asked pertaining to the set of four pictures, and all players used the buttons on their chairs to buzz in, but only the first player to do so could answer. A correct answer was worth five points, but an incorrect answer or buzzing in without answering cost a player two points. Two sets of pictures were played in this manner.

==== Round 2—Observation ====
This round was played like round four in the original version; for this was where players were tested on memory. For they were shown a scene from a public domain film or cartoon, and they were asked two questions about it, which could be either visual or verbal information, in turn in reverse order. Each correct answer was worth 10 points. There was also a bonus round in which the players were directed to the Krypton Cart, which concealed an object seen or mentioned in the film. The players were given five clues to its identity, and had to jump in to answer. A correct answer was worth 10 points but each player could only jump in once during the bonus round meaning if the player buzzed in with an incorrect answer or buzz in without answering the cart did not open and the player sat out for the rest of the round.

==== Round 3—Physical Ability ====
Like in the ABC version, this round featured an obstacle course run that was pretaped in advance. This course took place in Palos Verdes and began with a death slide, followed by a bicycle race, and ended with the Krypton Pavilion, a series of skill and agility tests. Scoring remained the same as the original version.

In most cases, only the first-place finisher was seen crossing the finish line.

==== Final Round—General Knowledge ====
The final round was played like the original: the contestants were asked a series of general knowledge questions, with each answer leading to the next question, except the round now lasted for two minutes (2:00) and most questions were multiple-choice. Also, the contestants played on a podium in the center of the stage instead of with the buzzers on their chairs. As in the first round each correct answer was worth five points, but each incorrect answer lost two points.

The player with the most points at the end of the game (indicated by the sound of a car alarm) won prizes, and the eight highest scoring members of each sex advanced to the four quarterfinals at the end of the season, from which the four highest-scoring members of each sex advanced to the two semifinals. The highest-scoring girl and boy in each of those episodes competed in the finals, the winner of which received $20,000 in cash.

== Unsold Remakes ==
So far, only two version were made but never aired.

=== Fox era ===
In 2000, Fox recorded a new five-episode hour-long version with Pat O'Brien as host, but it did not make it to air. In 2026, only three out of the five episodes can be viewed at The Game Show Vault(formerly Wink's Vault).

=== SyFy era ===
In 2015, it was announced that the cable network was developing a new remake of the show as then president at the time Dave Howe whom have previously worked for the BBC for 15 years revealed that this was one of the shows that he would like to bring back. But, has never been developed since then.
