= Games People Play (1980 TV series) =

American reality television series

- Genre: Sport
- Directed by: Jim Cross; Tom Munshower
- Presented by: Mike Adamle; Bryant Gumbel
- Country of origin: United States
- Original language: English

Production
- Running time: 60 minutes

Original release
- Network: NBC
- Release: 21 August 1980 – 24 September 1981

Games People Play is an NBC reality television series that ran from 1980 to 1981, hosted by Bryant Gumbel, with celebrity and athlete co-hosts such as Cyndy Garvey, Mike Adamle, and Johnny Bench. The format centers on unusual sports competitions, including guzzling beer, a belly flop contest and a taxicab demolition derby. Celebrities of film, TV, and sports were frequent guest participants on the show as well. Originally previewed in April 1980 as The Sunday Games, the format was inspired by another NBC show Real People, which had recurring segments featuring similar competitions and displays of unusual skills.

The series is noted for popularizing Mr. T, who won the "America's Best Bouncer" (sometimes reported as "World's Toughest Bouncer") competition twice on the show, donating his $3000 prize to charity. Mr. T was subsequently cast by Sylvester Stallone as Clubber Lang, the villain in Rocky III.

The title of the show is a play on the title of Games People Play, a popular psychology book from the 1960s about mind games and interactions within relationships.

== Reception ==
Critical reception was negative, described as ranging "from dismissive to disdainful". People contributor Scott Veale described Games People Play as "NBC's laughable 'trashsport' show".

Nielsen ratings for the show were moderately high when the season began, attributed to a delay in scripted television production due to a 1980 Hollywood actor's strike which put the show against a number of reruns and made-for-TV movies. The show's ratings fell quickly though after new shows returned, leading to its cancellation announcement in December 1980.
