= Original Six (directors) =

Group of female film directors

The Original Six are a group of women directors who created the Women's Steering Committee (WSC) of the Directors Guild of America (DGA). Dolores Ferraro, Joelle Dobrow, Lynne Littman, Nell Cox, Susan Bay Nimoy and Victoria Hochberg formed the Women's Steering Committee of the Directors Guild of America in 1979. They carried out landmark research showing that women held only 0.5% of directing jobs in film and television, which they reported to the Guild, the studios and the press.

As a result of the Original Six's research, the Directors Guild of America filed a class-action lawsuit against Warner Brothers and Columbia Pictures in 1983 on the grounds of gender discrimination. On March 5, 1985, the case was dismissed when the judge removed the DGA as the class representative.

The risk of legal action, along with pressure from the public and the DGA, was followed by a slow (but not smooth) increase in the number of women directors working in the entertainment industry. Members of the Original Six continue to make films and television shows, to protest against gender discrimination in Hollywood and to support female employment on film and television at the directing level.

== Directors Guild of America ==
External videos
- The Founding of the Women's Steering Committee, Directors Guild of America, Martha Cotton, Producer.

Membership in the Directors Guild of America (DGA) was prestigious and its members were considered "real professionals". In 1967–1968, only twenty women directors were members of the DGA—1% of its members. By 1974–1975, forty-six women directors were DGA members (1.54% of its members). Most of those women worked in television, news, education, or industry, not on feature films.

Nell Cox, Joelle Dobrow, Dolores Ferraro, Victoria Hochberg, Lynne Littman and Susan Bay Nimoy were all members of the DGA. They compared notes on the difficulty of finding work as directors. In 1979, they formed the Women's Steering Committee (WSC) of the Directors Guild of America. They were supported by DGA director Michael Franklin, during whose tenure the Guild's first diversity committees were formed. The group began to formally investigate and report on the hiring practices of the major film studios.

For the next year, the Original Six gathered statistics, documenting that Hollywood had a systemic problem with gender. On March 1, 1980, they reported to the Guild's National Board that during the previous 30 years, women directors had been hired for only 0.5% of the possible directing opportunities. Over the next three years, they took their results to the major studios, advocating for changes with little result. The committee met with major executives including Barry Diller (Paramount), Ned Tanen (Universal), and Frank Wells (Warner Bros.) and television sitcom producer Norman Lear. Their results were also leaked to the press.

Littman has reflected on how it felt to challenge men who had the power to make or break one's career.

"We were products of the women's movement, and the civil rights movement," she says. "And we alienated enough men so that they felt they owed us nothing, but we had so little left to lose. And the men in the DGA who helped us, like Michael Franklin, loved that we were fighters. Getting out there and advocating for our rights only made us feel stronger."

== Legal action ==
While executives like Norman Lear may have been moved by the "embarrassing, shameful statistics" that the Original Six had compiled, they made few if any changes in response to the WSC presentations.

In 1983, on the basis of the research done by the Original Six, the DGA sued two studios, Warner Bros. and Columbia Pictures, in a class-action suit for discrimination. Dobrow was the only member of the Original Six to put her name on the lawsuit, but all six women helped select the lawyer and their research formed much of the evidence to be presented. They agreed to wait a year before moving their case forward, so that a committee representing African American minorities could gather information and join in the suit.

On March 5, 1985, the case was dismissed on procedural grounds when Judge Pamela Rymer removed the DGA as the class representative. Columbia Pictures and Warner Bros. argued, in effect, that they should not be held responsible for gender discrimination because another party - the Directors Guild itself - was also involved in gender discrimination. While the studios chose the director for a film, the Directors Guild contract gave that director the right to select the assistant directors.

The Los Angeles Times reported in 1986: "The studios argued that the DGA contract gives directors the right to select the first assistant director, and the first assistant the right to select the second assistant. Thus, the studios could only hire the director, not the assistant directors. How could they be accused of discrimination if they couldn't do all of the hiring? Judge Rymer ruled on this claim rather than on the actual issue of whether discrimination had occurred."

Director Maria Giese, who has studied DGA v. WB/CPI and is working with the American Civil Liberties Union on an investigation of gender bias in Hollywood, begun in 2015, explains "The DGA could not lead the class action, because they suffered from a conflict of interest, which was a correct ruling, as sad as it was." Because the ruling was restricted to the issue of whether it was legitimate for those bringing the suit to do so, the case was not considered to have precedential value, and was not published. Without the DGA's backing the Original Six and other individuals lacked the resources for a further court challenge.

== Documenting gender discrimination ==
Although DGA v. WB/CPI was dismissed, the threat of legal action and the accompanying publicity still may have been a "galvanizing event". Filing of the suit was followed by an increase in the number of women employed as directors.

When they founded the WSC, the Original Six presented statistics showing that only 0.5 percent of all directing assignments for films and TV shows were going to women. Following the court case, the percentage of women directing television episodes increased, reaching a peak of women directing 16% of television shows in 1995.

The number of women film directors has also risen, albeit erratically. Since 2007 Stacy L. Smith, Founder and Director of the Annenberg Inclusion Initiative at the University of Southern California has led studies to track the gender and race of Hollywood directors. Between 2007 and 2019, the percentage of women directors averaged 4.8%, with lows of 1.9% (2013, 2014) and highs of 8 (2008) and 10.6% (2019). From 2007 to 2019, 82.6% of film directors were white males, another 12.6% were males from under-represented groups, 3.9% were white women, and less than 1% were women from under-represented groups. The Annenberg Inclusion Initiative more broadly studies representation of gender, race, LGBT status, disability, and age on screen and in the entertainment industry.

In spite of the fact that half of the major film school graduates are women, women are still predominantly excluded from the highest levels of big-budget filmmaking. Smith has stated "the film industry still functions as a straight, white boy's club. I think we're seeing, across the landscape, an erasure of certain groups; women, people of color, the LGBT community ... this is really [an] epidemic of invisibility."

Gender disparity and gender dynamics in the industry have also been studied by the Center for the Study of Women in Television and Film at San Diego State University, led by Martha M. Lauzen, the Women's Media Center, and the Geena Davis Institute on Gender in Media. Organizations such as Women in Film and Television International and Gamechanger Films and campaigns such as 5050x2020 work to improve the representation of women in film.

== Personal impact ==
Lynne Littman has said: "This fight was central to all of our lives and careers and fortunately, we were products of our generation of feminists who believed in more than our individual ambition."

Lynne Littman won an Oscar for Best Documentary Short Subject at the 1977 Academy Awards for her film Number Our Days, based on the fieldwork of anthropologist Barbara Myerhoff with Eastern European Jewish senior citizens. Her first feature film, Testament (1983), resulted in an Academy Award nomination for lead actress Jane Alexander. Among her other works is Having Our Say: The Delany Sisters' First 100 Years. Littman has received four Los Angeles Emmy Awards for her work in television and has been nominated repeatedly for Cine Golden Eagle awards.

Victoria Hochberg directed the documentary A Simple Matter of Justice (1978) about the Equal Rights Amendment and The Right to Die (1974) for ABC News, about patient rights. It was nominated for an Emmy Award. Hochberg continues to direct television and movies. She has won awards for television dramas including Just a Regular Kid: An AIDS Story (1988) and Jacob Have I Loved (1990) and has been nominated for Directors Guild of America Awards for outstanding directorial achievement for Honey, I Shrunk the Kids (1999) and Sex and the City (2000).

Joelle Dobrow's family were union organizers. She was a member of both the DGA and the nascent organization Women in Film. In 1977 Dobrow directed segments of Good Morning America for Rona Barrett. Dobrow later completed a graduate degree and became a consultant working with arts organizations. The subsequent career and whereabouts of Dolores Ferraro are not known.

Nell Cox started out as a documentary and independent filmmaker in New York, and moved to Los Angeles in 1976–1977. Her feminist Western feature film, Liza's Pioneer Diary (1977) was nominated for Best Writing by the Television Critics' Circle. She directed prime time television shows including M*A*S*H, Lou Grant, The Waltons, and L.A. Law. Cox returned to New York in the 1990s to direct the independent film Hudson River Blues. More recent works have included a PBS "Great Performance" on Jelly Roll Morton (Jelly's Last Jam, 1992), a PBS documentary on playwright Marsha Norman (1995), and Statecraft (2003), documenting the passage of bills in the Kentucky legislature. She is developing some of her many story ideas into novels.

Susan Bay Nimoy works with Sundance to mentor women filmmakers. She returned to directing in 2018 with Eve, writing the script as she mourned her husband, Leonard Nimoy. She also starred in the film after the lead actress pulled out at the last minute due to discomfort with revealing her aging body on film. The lack of representation of "women of age" onscreen was one of Nimoy's motivations in creating the film. Eve was one of five films at the 2018 Sundance Film Festival to focus on women in their 70s.

== Recognition ==
In 2014, the 35th anniversary of the founding of the Women's Steering Committee was marked by the Directors Guild of America with speeches by Nell Cox, Joelle Dobrow, Lynne Littman, Vicki Hochberg, and Susan Nimoy and a ceremony recognizing the role of the Original Six. It almost didn't happen. When the idea was first proposed, it was claimed that the Original Six had not been an official committee, and that an official women's committee was not formed until 1991. That claim was refuted by other members of the Directors Guild, but it illustrates how women's history can be erased.

The 2018 documentary This Changes Everything was directed by Tom Donahue and produced by Donohue, Ilan Arboleda and Kerianne Flynn with support from the Geena Davis Institute on Gender in Media. The film examines gender inequality in the Hollywood film industry, interviewing women actors and filmmakers including Meryl Streep, Natalie Portman, Geena Davis, Taraji P. Henson, Shonda Rhimes, and Joey Soloway. In the latter part of the film the groundbreaking work of the Original Six is recognized and five of the Original Six are interviewed. The film has received several awards, including the 2019 Greg Gund Memorial Standing Up Competition at the Cleveland International Film Festival and a 2020 Philanthropy Women's Leadership Award.

== See also ==
- Women's Steering Committee of the Directors Guild of America
