= Nina Morgan =

Nina Morgan may refer to:

- Nina Morgan, fictional character in Cuckoo (TV series)
- Nina Morgan, fictional character in The Love Boat: A Valentine Voyage, played by Shanna Reed
- Nina Morgan, fictional character in Midsomer Murders, played by Genevieve O'Reilly

== See also ==
- Nina Morgan-Jones, fashion stylist
