= Don't Talk to Strangers =

Don't Talk to Strangers may refer to:

- Don't Talk to Strangers (film), a 1994 TV film
- "Don't Talk to Strangers" (The Beau Brummels song), 1965
- "Don't Talk to Strangers" (Rick Springfield song), 1982
- "Don't Talk to Strangers" (Hedley song), 2009
- "Don't Talk to Strangers", a song by Dio, from the album Holy Diver
