= Down the Drain =

Down the Drain may refer to:

- Down the Drain (CSI), an episode of the TV series CSI: Crime Scene Investigation
- Down the Drain (film), a 1990 American comedy film
