= Deena Metzger =

American writer, healer, and teacher (born 1936)

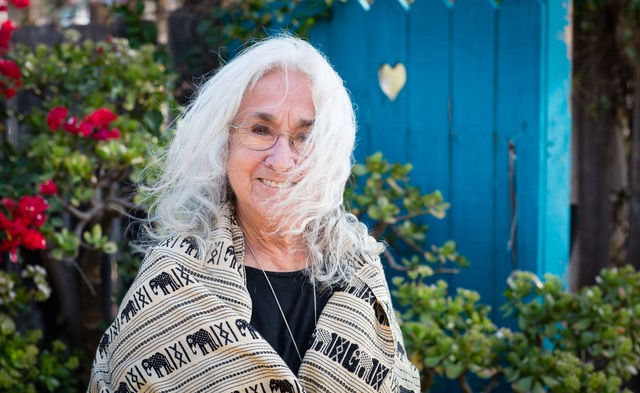
- Deena Metzger at her home in Topanga, CA, in 2013.
- Born: 1936 (age 89–90); Brooklyn, New York, US
- Education: Brandeis University
- Occupations: Novelist; poet; healer; teacher
- Writing career
- Language: English
- Notable works: Ruin and Beauty: New and Selected Poems, La Negra y Blanca

Deena Metzger (born 1936) is an American writer, healer, and teacher whose work spans multiple genres including the novel, poetry, non-fiction, and plays. Metzger is a creative writing teacher and feminist scholar. In the 1960s and 1970s Metzger was a member of the Critical Studies faculty at the California Institute of the Arts, taught English at Los Angeles Valley College, and was on the faculty of the Feminist Studio Worship. Metzger also founded the writing program at Woman's Building in Los Angeles and was a contributing editor to Chrysalis: A Magazine of Women's Culture that ran from 1977 to 1980 in Woman's Building.

Metzger is also known for her image in Hella Hammid's 1977 photograph, sometimes referred to as "The Warrior," or “Tree” poster, in which the post-mastectomy Metzger stands in a celebratory pose. She first introduced and convened Daré, monthly gatherings for community and individual healing in 1999 and then ReVisioning Medicine in 2004. Her novel La Negra y Blanca won the 2012 Oakland Pen Award for Literature.

== Early life and education ==
Deena Metzger was born in Brooklyn, New York in 1936 to Arnold and Bella Posy. She first attended college from 1953 to 1955 at Brandeis University. From 1955 to 1957 she attended Brooklyn College, where she became a co-editor of the Brooklyn College literary journal with Shela Pearl. She received an M.A. in English and American Literature and a Community College Teaching Certificate from UCLA. She received a PhD in Literature and Women's Culture from International College in 1975.

== Career ==
In May 1969, Metzger was teaching an English class at Los Angeles Valley College and was fired for “immoral conduct” and “evident unfitness to teach” when teaching a unit applying Supreme Court decisions regarding literature and pornography. She subsequently brought the case to court and was reinstated in 1972. She also taught in the Critical Studies Department at the California Institute of the Arts from 1970 to 1975. There she taught the first class in journal writing.

In 1972, she spent time in Chile and was part of a film collective that made an early media response, the film pamphlet, "Chile with Poems and Guns, three months after the golpé".

From 1973 to 1978 she was the director of the writing program for the Woman's Building and the Feminist Studio Workshop in Los Angeles. The Woman's Building was the first feminist institution of higher learning outside of a university.

In 1977 she discovered she had breast cancer, and had a mastectomy. Later, she was photographed by Hella Hammid for a poster that showed her naked from the waist up, with a tattoo covering the scar from her mastectomy. This became known as the “Tree Poster” or the Warrior Poster, also called "I Am No Longer Afraid". Deena writes:

Our intention in turning it into a poster was to invite the world to look at a one-breasted woman and exult in her health and vitality. An alliance with the life force on all levels resulted from meeting the illness as a messenger – it called me to change my life in ways that would show themselves to be good for me and for the community.

She was co-editor of Intimate Nature: The Bond Between Women and Animals, with Linda Hogan and Brenda Peterson, a critical text on animal intelligence and agency published in 1998, that speaks also to the profound knowledge that is gathered when relationships are intimate rather than alienated or objectified.

In 1999, she visited with Nganga, healer, Augustine Kandenwa in Zimbabwe and afterwards introduced Daré, healing community, to North America.

In 2004, her work as a healer took a new form when she initiated ReVisioning Medicine, an alliance between medical and medicine people to create a medicine that does no harm to humans or the earth. From 2004 to the present, she has collaborated with everyday gandhis, a grassroots, peacebuilding NGO in Liberia.

She is also on the Faculty of the Kerulos Center. The Deena Metzger Literature of Restoration Fellowship at Mesa Refuge was offered to novelist Stan Rusworth in 2015.

=== Poster ===
'Tree, the mastectomy poster,' has been widely circulated and has appeared in various film and television documentaries, journals and newspapers including The Village Voice, Revolution Nursing Journal, Common Ground, the Detroit Metro Times, Our Bodies Our Selves, Women's Spirit Source Book and was the cover of the Oklahoma County Medical Society, April, 90. This photograph is canonized in the body of art made by breast cancer survivors.

Photograph by Hella Hammid, words by Deena Metzger, poster design by Sheila Levrant de Bretteville. (Wingbow Press, 1989). 24"x17". Inscription reads:

I am no longer afraid of mirrors where I see the sign of the Amazon, the one who shoots arrows. There was a fine line across my chest where a knife entered, but now a branch winds about the scar and travels from arm to heart. Green leaves cover the branch, grapes hang there and a bird appears. What grows in me now is vital and does not cause me harm. I think the bird is singing. I have relinquished some of the scars. I have designed my chest with care given to an illuminated manuscript. I am no longer ashamed to make love. Love is a battle I can win. I have a body of a warrior who does not kill or wound. On the book of my body, I have permanently inscribed a tree.

— Deena Metzger

== Awards ==
- The first Academic Freedom Award, the California Federation of Teachers, after being reinstated by a unanimous decision of the Supreme Court of California to her tenured teaching position at Los Angeles Valley College from which Metzger had been fired in 1969. This decision was regarded as a significant victory for the cause of academic freedom.
- Writing Fellowship the National Endowment for the Arts, 1978
- First annual Vesta Award in Writing, the Woman's Building, Los Angeles, 1982
- "Two Writers in a Friendship of Unabashed Exposure: Barbara Myerhoff and Deena Metzger," Lilith, Volume 25, No. 2, Summer 2000. Winner Simon Rockower Award/American Jewish Press Association, Excellence in Special Sections or Supplements Magazine, June 2001
- 2012, PEN Oakland/Josephine Miles Literary Award for her novel, “La Negra y Blanca” published by Hand to Hand, 2011

== Works ==
=== Books ===
- Skin:Shadows/Silence, a novel, West Coast Poetry Review, 1976.
- Dark Milk, poetry, Momentum Press, Los Angeles, 1978.
- The Axis Mundi Poems, Jazz Press, Santa Cruz, 1981, ISBN 978-0937310090.
- Tree/The Woman Who Slept with Men to Take the War Out of Them, Peace Press, 1981. Reprinted, Wingbow Press, 1983.
- Looking For The Faces Of God, poetry, Parallax Press, Berkeley, 1989, ISBN 978-0938077237.
- What Dinah Thought, a novel, Viking/Penguin, 1989, ISBN 978-0670827503.
- A Sabbath Among The Ruins, poetry, Parallax press, 1992, ISBN 978-0938077534.
- Writing For Your Life, A Guide And Companion To The Inner Worlds, Harper San Francisco 1992,ISBN 978-0062506122 Published in Italian as Scrivere Per Crescere, Astrolabio, 1992.
- Tree: Essays & Pieces, North Atlantic Books, 1997. ISBN 978-1556432453 (updated/expanded from 1981/1983 editions) Published in Italian as LINFA in 1978, La Salamandra, Milano.
- Intimate Nature: The Bond Between Women & Animals, co-edited with Linda Hogan and Brenda Peterson, Ballantine Books, 1998. Paperback edition April 1999. ISBN 978-0449003008
- The Other Hand, Red Hen Press, 2000. ISBN 978-1888996241
- Entering the Ghost River: Meditations on the Theory and Practice of Healing, (non-fiction) Hand to Hand, 2001, ISBN 978-0972071826
- Doors: A Fiction For Jazz Horn, Red Hen Press, 2005, ISBN 978-1888996999
- From Grief into Vision: A Council, (non-fiction) Hand to Hand, 2006, ISBN 978-0972071802
- Ruin and Beauty: New and Selected Poems, Red Hen Press, 2009, ISBN 978-1597094252
- Feral, Hand to Hand, February, 2011, ISBN 978-0972071857
- La Negra y Blanca, A Novel, Hand to Hand, June, 2011, ISBN 978-0972071840
- A Rain of Night Birds, A Novel, Hand to Hand, April, 2017, ISBN 978-0998344300
- The Burden of Light, Poetry, Hand to Hand, November, 2019
- La Vieja: A Journal of Fire, A Novel, Hand to Hand, February, 2022, ISBN 0998344362

=== Anthology publications ===
- The Awakened Warrior; ed. by Rick Fields
- A Casebook on Anais Nin, ed. by Robert Zaller
- Cradle and All, Women Writers on Pregnancy & Birth, ed. by Laura Chester
- Coming Into Our Fullness, Women Turning Forty by Cathleen Rountree; Deep Down
- New Sensory Writing by Women, ed. by Laura Chester
- Dharma Gaia, A Harvest of Essays in Buddhism and Ecology, ed. by Allan Hunt Badiner
- Erotic By Nature, ed. by David Steinberg
- Grand Passion, The Poets of Los Angeles and Beyond, ed. by Suzanne Lummis and Charles H. Webb
- Gridlock: An Anthology of poetry about Southern California, edited by Eliot Fried
- Hear the Silence, ed by Irene Zahava
- Her Soul Beneath the Bone: Women's Poetry on Breast Cancer, ed. by Leatrice Lifshitz
- Invocation L.A. Urban Multicultural Poetry, eds. Michelle T. Clinton, Sesshu Foster, Naomi Quinonez
- Love Stories by New Women, Charlene Swansea and Barbara Campbell
- Meeting the Shadow, ed. by Connie Zweig and Jeremiah Abrams
- Nourishing the Soul, ed. by Anne Simpkinson, Charles Simpkinson & Rose Solari
- Ordinary Magic, ed. by John Welwood
- Pleasures The Erotic Edge, Erotica For Couples and Erotic Interludes, ed. by Lonnie Barbach
- Prayers For a Thousand Years, edited by Elizabeth Roberts and Elias Amidon
- Recollections of Anais Nin by Her Contemporaries, ed. Benjamin Franklin V
- Rising Tides, ed. by Laura Chester and Sharon Barba
- The Soul of Nature, ed. by Michael Tobias and Georgianne Cowan
- The Soul Unearthed, ed. By Cass Adams
- Storming Heaven's Gate: An Anthology of Spiritual Writings by Women, ed by Amber Coverdale Sumrall and Patrice Vecchione
- Stories of the Spirit, Stories of the Heart, ed. by Christina Feldman and Jack Kornfield
- The Streets Inside: Ten Los Angeles Poets, ed. by Bill Mohr
- Stubborn Light, The Best of the Sun, Volume III, ed. By Sy Safransky
- To Be a Woman, ed. by Connie Zweig
- Touching Fire, eds. Louise Thornton, Jan Sturtevant & Amber Coverdale Sumrall
- Visionary Voices, ed. by Penny Rosenwasser
- The Well of Creativity interviews by Michael Toms with Hay House
- Word of Mouth, 150 Short-Short Stories by 99 Women Writers, ed. Irene Zahava
- Revamping the World, On the Return of the Holy Prostitute, first published by the Utne Review has been widely circulated and reprinted in dozens of journals.

=== Audiotapes ===
- This Body/My Life, Sounds True
- The Book Of Hags, produced by KPFK for Pacifica and issued by Black Box.
- Breaking The Silence: Jewish Feminists Tell Their Stories, produced by Naomi Newman of the Traveling Jewish Theatre. From the Series Heart of Wisdom as broadcast on American Public Radio.
- The Creative Use of Imagination in Healing in Cancer As A Turning Point, Sounds True.

=== Drama, video and theatre productions ===
- Co-writer and co-producer the hour-long documentary film Chile: With Poems and Guns, 1973.
- Writer associate of Barbara Myerhoff of the Department of Visual Anthropology at the University of Southern California on the cultural video gerontology project, Life Not Death In Venice.
- Barbara Myerhoff, (2007), Stories as Equipment for Living, edited by Marc Kaminsky, Deena Metzger, and Marc Weiss, with an Introduction by Thomas R. Cole, and a Foreword by Professor Jack Kugelmass, University of Michigan Press.
- Theatre production Not As Sleepwalkers directed by Jeremy Blahnik, Los Angeles 1977. Theatre production
- Dreams Against The State, directed by Steven Kent, [in private homes, churches, community houses,] Los Angeles 1981. Seven Stages, Atlanta 1986. La Verne University, CA, January 2005.
- Staged reading The Woman Who Slept With Men To Take The War Out Of Them Toronto and Montreal 1985.
- How Will I Survive: A Documentary about Breast Cancer, video, directed by Johanna Dematrakis, produced by Marc Harris, Goal Productions 1993.
