= Hoops McCann =

Hoops McCann may refer to:

- A character in the 1980 song “Glamour Profession” by Steely Dan
- A character in the 1986 film One Crazy Summer, portrayed by John Cusack
