= Joel Murray =

American actor (born 1963)

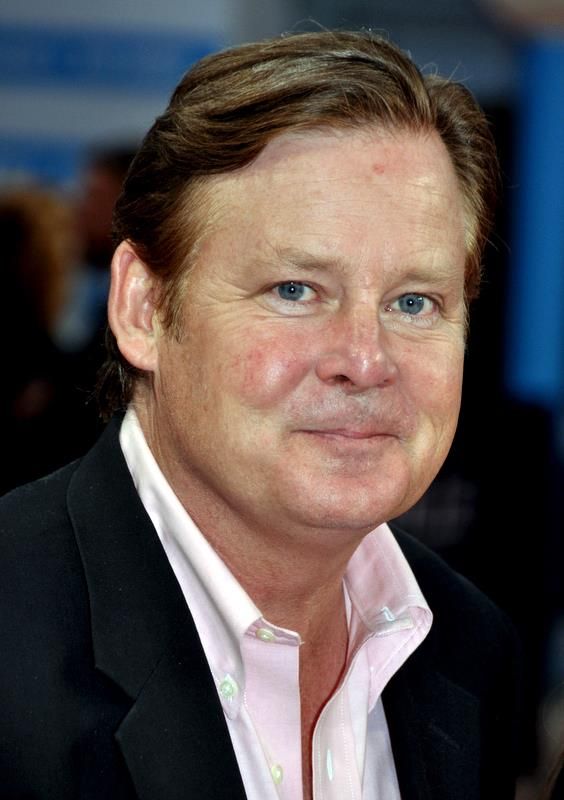
- Murray at the 2012 Deauville American Film Festival
- Born: April 17, 1963 (age 63); Wilmette, Illinois, U.S.
- Occupations: Actor; comedian
- Years active: 1986–present
- Spouse: Eliza Coyle (m. 1989)
- Children: 4
- Relatives: Brian Doyle-Murray (brother); Bill Murray (brother)

Joel Murray (born April 17, 1963) is an American actor. He is well known for his roles in the television series Mad Men, Grand, Love & War, Dharma & Greg, Still Standing, and Shameless. He has also appeared in films including God Bless America and Monsters University.

== Early life ==
Murray was born and raised in Wilmette, Illinois, to Lucille (née Collins; 1921–1988), a mail room clerk, and Edward Joseph Murray II (1921–1967), a lumber salesman. He grew up in an Irish Catholic family.

One of nine siblings, he is the younger brother of actors Bill Murray, Brian Doyle-Murray, and John Murray. A sister, Nancy, is an Adrian Dominican Sister in Michigan, who toured the U.S. portraying St. Catherine of Siena. His brother Ed died in 2020. Their father died in 1967 at the age of 46 from complications of diabetes.

In high school at Loyola Academy, Murray was captain of the football team and the lead actor in one of the school's musicals. His entertainment career began in Chicago, Illinois, where he performed at various improvisational theaters, including the Improv Olympic, the Improv Institute, and The Second City.

== Career ==
Murray voiced Cheetos mascot Chester Cheetah from the character's inception in 1986 until 1997. He was replaced by Pete Stacker in 1997.

Murray grew up watching his brothers Bill and Brian perform at Second City. He studied improvisation with Del Close and was a founding member of Chicago's Improv Olympic. He later worked with the Second City Touring Company and Second City Northwest in Rolling Meadows, Illinois, before joining the Chicago Mainstage for the 1989 revue The Gods Must Be Lazy.

Murray starred in the 1990 television series Grand, the 1991 comedy series Pacific Station, the 1992 comedy series Love & War as Ray Litvak, and the ABC series Dharma & Greg as Pete Cavanaugh. Murray also featured in commercials for First Chicago NBD. He provided his voice for the short-lived 1994 series Beethoven and the TV series 3-South. He played the supporting character "Fitz" on CBS's sitcom Still Standing. He appeared as Eddie Jackson on Showtime's series Shameless in 2011.

Murray's first film role was in the 1986 comedy film One Crazy Summer as George Calamari. His other roles include the 1988 comedy film Scrooged, with his brothers Bill, Brian, and John. He appeared in the 1992 movie Shakes the Clown with One Crazy Summer co-stars Bob Goldthwait and Tom Villard.

In 1996, Murray performed with his brothers Bill and Brian at the Cat Laughs festival in Kilkenny, Ireland, the first time all three had appeared onstage together.

Murray attended the Big Stinkin' International Improv & Sketch Comedy Festival twice, including in 1999, when he emceed a show at Austin Music Hall and was scheduled to teach a workshop.

In the first, second, fourth, fifth and seventh seasons of the Emmy-winning AMC TV series Mad Men, Murray had a recurring role and appeared in 15 episodes as copywriter Freddy Rumsen. He has made guest appearances on television shows such as The Nanny, Joan of Arcadia, Two and a Half Men, Malcolm in the Middle, Criminal Minds, and Blossom.

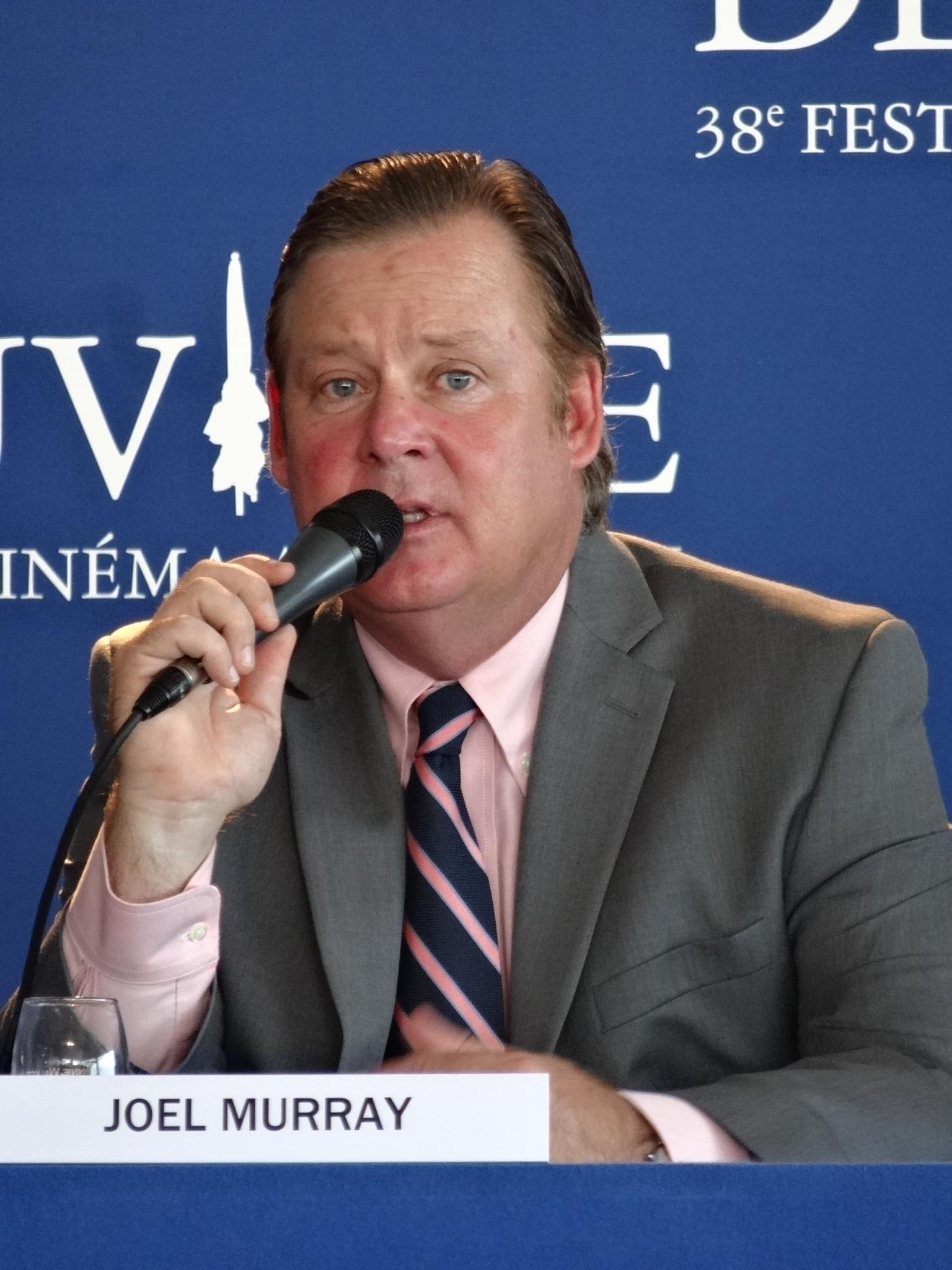
Murray in 2012

In the 2012 film God Bless America, Murray played Frank, a man who goes on a killing spree after becoming disgusted with American popular culture. Murray said he was surprised when director Bobcat Goldthwait offered him the lead, having expected a smaller role.

In the 2013 Pixar film Monsters University he provides the voice of Don Carlton, a middle-aged monster who is a college student and salesman.

Murray joined the touring improv show Whose Live Anyway? in 2012, performing alongside Ryan Stiles, Greg Proops and Jeff B. Davis. He continued performing with the group, including an October 2014 appearance at Seattle's Moore Theatre. He also portrayed Ted in the comedy horror film Bloodsucking Bastards.

== Personal life ==
Murray has been married to Eliza Coyle since 1989 and they have four children. He and his brothers own a country club themed restaurant, the Murray Brothers "Caddyshack" (run by his brother Andy), named after the 1980 comedy film Caddyshack that starred his brothers Bill and Brian, located in the World Golf Village resort near St. Augustine, Florida. In 2018, they opened a second location in the Chicago suburb of Rosemont, Illinois.

== Filmography ==
Year	Title	Role	Notes
1986	One Crazy Summer	George Calamari	Film debut
1987	Long Gone	Bart Polanski	TV movie
1988	Scrooged	Guest	
1989	Elvis Stories	Shopping Elvis / Paul	Short film
1990	Men Will Be Boys	Jerry	TV movie
1990	Grand	Norris Weldon	Series regular, 26 episodes
1991	Shakes the Clown	Milkman	
1991–1992	Pacific Station	Capt. Ken Epstein	Series regular, 13 episodes
1992	Blossom	Doug LeMeure	Episode: "House Guests"
1992	Only You	Bert	
1992–1995	Love & War	Ray Litvak	Series regular, 67 episodes
1994	Beethoven	Beethoven (voice)	Animated TV series
1995	Road Warriors	Dick Durkee	TV movie
1995	Partners	Ron Wolfe	Episode: "Who's Afraid of Ron and Cindy Wolfe?"
1996	Mr. & Mrs. Smith	Bob Myers	Episode: "The Bob Episode"
1996	Encino Woman	Mr. Jones	TV movie
1996	The Cable Guy	Basketball Player	
1997	The Nanny	Val's Date	Episode: "The Fifth Wheel"
1997–2002	Dharma & Greg	Pete Cavanaugh	Series regular, 119 episodes
1998	Hercules	Acheron (voice)	Episode: "Hercules and the Kids"
2000	The Thin Pink Line	Bartender	
2000	Buzz Lightyear of Star Command	Professor Triffid (voice)	2 episodes
2000–2002	Baby Blues	Carl Bitterman (voice)	Series regular, 13 episodes
2001	The Drew Carey Show	Bob	Episode: "Mr. Laffoon's Wild Ride"; uncredited
2002	It's All About You	Taxi Driver	
2002–2004	Teamo Supremo	Helius Inflato (voice)	4 episodes
2002	3-South	Various (voice)	TV series
2002	John Doe	Dante Langenhan	Episode: "Mind Games"
2003	Titletown		TV movie
2003	Malcolm in the Middle	Larry	Episode: "Hal's Friend"
2003	Nobody Knows Anything!	Robber #1	
2003–2006	Still Standing	Danny 'Fitz' Fitzsimmons	Recurring, 24 episodes
2004	Joan of Arcadia	Balloon Sculptor / God	Episode: "Vanity, Thy Name Is Human"
2005	See Anthony Run	Mr. Randall	Short film
2006	Hatchet	Doug Shapiro	
2007	American Body Shop	Bank Manager	Episode: "Shop for Sale"
2007–2013	Two and a Half Men	Various	Recurring, 5 episodes
2007–2014	Mad Men	Freddy Rumsen	Recurring, 15 episodes
2008	The Tiffany Problem	Mr. Reynolds	Short film
2008	Criminal Minds	Attorney General	Episode: "Minimal Loss"
2008	Cold Case	Bobby Kent	Episode: "One Small Step"
2009	Awaydays	Rugger Bugger 1	
2009	Mending Fences	Sam Bridgewater	TV movie
2010	Hatchet II	Shapiro	Uncredited
2010	My Boys	Crowley	2 episodes
2011	Shameless	Eddie Jackson	Recurring, 9 episodes
2011	Criminal Minds: Suspect Behavior	Medical Examiner	Episode: "Smother"
2011	The Artist	Police Officer Fire	
2011	God Bless America	Frank	
2012	It's Always Sunny in Philadelphia	Andrew Kane	Episode: "Frank's Back in Business"
2012	Desperate Housewives	Alan	Episode: "With So Little to Be Sure Of"
2013	Monsters University	Don Carlton (voice)	
2015	The McCarthys	Ray	Episode: "Sister Act"
2015	Bloodsucking Bastards	Ted	
2015–2016	Mike & Molly	Dr. Jeffries	Episodes: "Pie Fight" and "Cops on the Rocks"
2015–2017	The Leftovers	George Brevity	2 episodes
2016	Sophie and the Rising Sun	Sheriff Cooper	
2016	Mr. Pig	Gringo	
2016	Hidden America with Jonah Ray	Pete	Episode: "Chicago: The Second Best City"
2016	Ghostbusters	Security Guard	Uncredited
2016	Killing Reagan	Edwin Meese	TV movie
2017	Shrink	Rollie	Series regular, 7 episodes
2017	American Gods	Mr. Paunch	Episode: "The Bone Orchard"
2017	The Big Bang Theory	Doug	Episode: "The Recollection Dissipation"
2017	Curb Your Enthusiasm	Bus Driver #1	Episode: "Namaste"
2018	Grey's Anatomy	Agent Martin Fields	Episode: "Beautiful Dreamer"
2018	Bobcat Goldthwait's Misfits & Monsters	Col. Douglas	Episode: "Patsy"
2019	Lodge 49	Doug Fife	Episode: "The Slide"
2020	AJ and the Queen	Motorcycle Cop	Episode: "Columbus"
2020, 2024	The Conners	Jim Daniels	2 episodes
2020	Monuments	Steven Lesca	
2021–2023	Heels	Eddie Earl	Recurring
2022–2023	Bob Hearts Abishola	Max Wheeler	Episodes: "Bibles to Brothels" and "Uncharted Waters of Mediocrity"
2023	White House Plumbers	Don	2 episodes
2024	Extended Family	Danny Walsh	Episode: "The Consequences of Being Irish"
2026	Madden	Pat Summerall	
2026	A Course Called Ireland	Himself	Episode 4: "Into the Fourth Quarter", Episode 5: "From the Rough"
