= Bloodsucking Bastards =

- Theatrical release poster
- Directed by: Brian James O'Connell
- Written by: Ryan Mitts; Dr. God
- Story by: Ryan Mitts
- Produced by: Brett Forbes; Patrick Rizzotti; Brandon Evans; Colleen Hard; Justin Ware
- Starring: Fran Kranz; Joey Kern; Emma Fitzpatrick; Pedro Pascal; Joel Murray; Justin Ware; Marshall Givens
- Cinematography: Matt Mosher
- Edited by: Andrew Coutts
- Music by: Anton Sanko
- Production companies: Fortress Features; MTY Productions
- Distributed by: Scream Factory
- Release date: January 23, 2015 (Slamdance Film Festival)
- Running time: 86 minutes
- Country: United States
- Language: English

Bloodsucking Bastards is a 2015 American comedy horror film directed by Brian James O'Connell, written by Ryan Mitts and Dr. God, O'Connell's comedy group. The film stars Fran Kranz, Pedro Pascal, Emma Fitzpatrick, and Joey Kern. The film was limited released on September 4, 2015, and through video on demand by Scream Factory.

== Plot ==
At the office where they work together, acting sales manager Evan Sanders talks to his slacker friend and coworker Tim about an upcoming presentation for the Phallucite account. After an awkward moment between Evan and the head of HR Amanda in the break room, Tim explains to coworkers Andrew and Mike that Amanda said “I love you” to Evan and Evan's response was, “no.” Branch president Ted Plunkett passes over Evan for a promotion and instead hires Max Phillips as the new sales manager. Max went to college with Evan and Tim, but Evan had him kicked out after Max slept with his girlfriend. Max moves into Evan's office and starts hitting on Amanda.

In the office alone playing video games after hours, Mike is killed in one of the bathroom stalls. Evan finds Mike's body in the morning, but it is gone by the time he alerts everyone. Max secretly turns office employee Dave into a vampire. Formerly passive Dave becomes aggressive in demanding that everyone pay what is owed to the office sports betting pool. Anxious to complete his Phallucite presentation, Evan uses Zabeth, who harbors a crush on him, to retrieve files from the basement. Zabeth is attacked and turned into a vampire.

Evan convinces Andrew to work late with him. Andrew goes to the basement and is attacked by Zabeth. Meanwhile, Evan searches Max's office, finding photos of Amanda and personnel files where each employee photograph is marked with an x, circle, or check. Andrew returns upstairs and seemingly drops dead in front of Evan. Evan hides in a supply closet. Determining that Max is behind the murders, Evan calls Amanda with a warning, but Max answers her phone and taunts him. Evan eventually passes out. Ted, Tim, and Max find Evan in the morning. Andrew returns as a vampire and presents the completed Phallucite presentation to the bosses. Ted admonishes Evan for not finishing it himself. However, Max strangely defends Evan to protect Evan's job.

Evan tries convincing Tim that vampires have overtaken the office. Tim reveals several odd events he witnessed that corroborate Evan's wild claim, including watching Max turn administrative assistant Elaine into a vampire. Amanda still refuses to believe that anything supernatural is going on. Evan worries that Max will turn her into a vampire like the other employees. Evan and Tim go to security guard Frank for help. Frank reveals that he was with Tim when they witnessed the ongoing vampire activity. The three men go to Frank's car for weapons and discover that Frank's vehicle was robbed. The Janitor reveals he is a vampire by attacking Frank. Frank recovers and stakes the Janitor through his heart, killing him.

Evan, Tim, and Frank return to the office and discover that all of the employees are now productive vampires. The men arm themselves with office supplies before confronting Ted, Max, and Andrew in Ted's office. Amanda is also present. Ted reveals that he knew Max was turning employees into vampires and that he sanctioned it so that employee performance would improve. Evan reveals that the files he found in Max's office prove that Max planned to kill Ted. Before Ted can act, Max snaps Ted's neck.

Max and Andrew allow the three men to leave Ted's office with Amanda, but they are surrounded by the vampire employees. After a long battle, all of the vampires are killed. Max calls in the legal team, also turned into vampires, as reinforcements. He then compels Amanda back into Ted's office and leaves the three men to continue fighting. Andrew kills vampire Dave because he never liked him and ends up in a confrontation with Tim during which they debate how their faceoff should end. Frank dies combating the vampires from Legal. Evan returns to Ted's office where he and Amanda ultimately kill Max. Afterwards, Tim finds Evan and Amanda covered in blood and making out amidst the carnage. The three of them calmly leave the building as day breaks. A cleaning woman arrives at the grisly scene and is attacked and bitten by Andrew.

== Cast ==
- Fran Kranz as Evan
- Joey Kern as Tim
- Emma Fitzpatrick as Amanda
- Marshall Givens as Frank
- Pedro Pascal as Max
- Joel Murray as Ted
- Justin Ware as Andrew
- Yvette Yates as Zabeth
- Neil Garguilo as Mike
- David F. Park as Dave
- Parvesh Cheena as Jack
- Sean Cowhig as Janitor
- Zabeth Russell as Elaine
- Patricia Rae as Sofia

== Release ==
Bloodsucking Bastards had its World Premiere as the opening night film of the 2015 Slamdance Film Festival in Park City, Utah. Shortly after it was announced, Scream Factory, had acquired distribution rights to the film. The film went on to premiere at the Sarasota Film Festival on April 11, 2015. and the Texas Frightmare Weekend on May 1, 2015. The film was released on September 4, 2015, in a limited release and through video on demand.

== Reception ==
On the review aggregator website Rotten Tomatoes, 70% of 23 critics' reviews are positive, with an average rating of 6.1/10. The website's consensus reads: "Bloodsucking Bastards gets a few gallons of B-movie fun out of its sanguine humor and solid cast, even if it isn't quite as wild as its title might suggest." Metacritic, which uses a weighted average, assigned the film a score of 50 out of 100, based on 7 critics, indicating "mixed or average" reviews.
