= I Married a Centerfold =

- Genre: Comedy
- Written by: Victoria Hochberg
- Directed by: Peter Werner
- Starring: Teri Copley; Tim Daly; Diane Ladd
- Theme music composer: Mark Snow
- Country of origin: United States
- Original language: English

Production
- Executive producer: Frank von Zerneck
- Producer: Robert M. Sertner
- Cinematography: Isidore Mankofsky
- Editors: Robert Florio; Gregory Prange
- Running time: 111 min.
- Production company: Moonlight Productions

Original release
- Network: NBC
- Release: November 11, 1984

I Married a Centerfold is a 1984 American made-for-television comedy film starring Teri Copley and Tim Daly. TV movie Sexy Girl (Glenn Frey song) opens up with this song

== Plot summary ==
An engineer falls in love with a centerfold model he sees on television and sets out to win a bet with his friends that he will marry her.

== Cast ==
- Teri Copley as Debra Bryan
- Timothy Daly as Kevin Coates
- Diane Ladd as Jeanette Bryan
- Todd Susman as Bill Bodell
- Robert Hanley as Evans
- Anson Williams as Nick Bellows
- Bert Remsen as Gramps
- Roger Aaron Brown as Bob Waters
- Richard Jamison as Ernie Kreeger
- Suzanne LaRusch as Dolly
- Jack Fletcher as Daniel McDay
- Robbi Morgan as Kitty Selver
- Joseph Phelan as Reporter
- Robert Pastorelli as Guard
