= Hell Den =

Animated sketch comedy series

- Genre: Adult animation; Animated comedy; Sketch comedy; Improvisational comedy
- Created by: Sean Cowhig; Neil Garguilo; Brian James O'Connell; David F. Park; Justin Ware
- Starring: Sean Cowhig; Neil Garguilo; Brian James O'Connell; David F. Park; Justin Ware
- Theme music composer: Gregory Jenkins
- Composer: Gregory Jenkins
- Country of origin: United States
- Original language: English
- No. of seasons: 2
- No. of episodes: 12

Production
- Executive producers: Sean Cowhig; Neil Garguilio; Brian James O'Connell; David F. Park; Garson Foos; Richard Foos; Justin Ware
- Editor: Jeffrey McMahon
- Running time: 11 minutes
- Production companies: Dr. God Productions; Rafael Raffaele Entertainment; Shout! Studios; TZGZ Productions (season 2)

Original release
- Network: DrinkTV (season 1); Syfy (season 2)
- Release: May 10, 2019 – December 12, 2020

Hell Den is an adult animated sketch comedy television series that premiered on May 10, 2019 on the internet platform DrinkTV and later moved to Syfy's late-night programming block, TZGZ. The second season premiered on November 7, 2020.

It is a post-apocalyptic series, with the protagonist being the only survivor of a destroyed civilization. With nothing else to do, the survivor spends his time by watching cartoons and movies in the last-surviving television and VCR on the planet.

== Plot ==
After an Uber-Apocalypse wipes out civilization, only one person miraculously survives: 12 year-old Andrew. With the last working TV and VCR in existence, he invites a motley group of apocalyptic creatures into his house to watch weird cartoons and old movies.

== Cast and characters ==
- Sean Cowhig as Fleek
- Neil Garguilo as Andrew
- Brian James O'Connell as Giantic
- David F. Park as Kenneth
- Justin Ware as Bet-C

== Episodes ==
| Season | Episodes | Originally released | | |
| Season | Episodes | First released | Last released | Network |
|---|---|---|---|---|
| 1 | 6 | May 10, 2019 | | DrinkTV |
| 2 | 6 | November 7, 2020 | December 12, 2020 | Syfy |

=== Season 1 (2019) ===
| No. overall | No. in season | Title | Directed by | Written by | Original release date | Prod. code | U.S. viewers (millions) |
|---|---|---|---|---|---|---|---|
| 1 | 1 | "New Friends" | Unknown | Unknown | May 10, 2019 | TBA | N/A |
Andrew makes some strange new friends...who just might kill him.
| 2 | 2 | "The Spill" | Unknown | Unknown | May 10, 2019 | TBA | N/A |
Fleek spills a gin martini on Bet-C, which has unexpected consequences.
| 3 | 3 | "The Foot Fist Bae" | Unknown | Unknown | May 10, 2019 | TBA | N/A |
Giantic's wife shows up and things get gross.
| 4 | 4 | "Gender Swap" | Unknown | Unknown | May 10, 2019 | TBA | N/A |
Fleek flips genders proving gender dynamics are a complicated topic.
| 5 | 5 | "The Horseman Cometh" | Unknown | Unknown | May 10, 2019 | TBA | N/A |
Kenneth is visited by his brothers...the Four Horsemen of the Apocalypse.
| 6 | 6 | "Birthday Blues" | Unknown | Unknown | May 10, 2019 | TBA | N/A |
It's Andrew's first birthday since humanity was destroyed and an unexpected guest shows up.

=== Season 2 (2020) ===
| No. overall | No. in season | Title | Directed by | Written by | Original release date | Prod. code | U.S. viewers (millions) |
|---|---|---|---|---|---|---|---|
| 7 | 1 | "My Sister, The Demon" | Unknown | Unknown | November 7, 2020 | TBA | 0.235 |
Andrew's sister Stephanie returns, but she's head-spinningly different.
| 8 | 2 | "Enter the Ghoulie" | Unknown | Unknown | November 14, 2020 | TBA | 0.157 |
While down in the basement, the gang makes a new friend in the annoying Ghoulie.
| 9 | 3 | "Welcome to the New 'Murica" | Unknown | Unknown | November 21, 2020 | TBA | 0.239 |
Just because the USA is rubble doesn't mean Andrew can't enjoy the Fourth of July.
| 10 | 4 | "BET-C Versus the House" | Unknown | Unknown | November 28, 2020 | TBA | 0.309 |
After BET-C spurns the Controlled Home Automated Zystem, or CHAZ, it starts acting up.
| 11 | 5 | "A Long Strange Trip" | Unknown | Unknown | December 5, 2020 | TBA | N/A |
The gang takes a psychedelic trip that makes their world even weirder than usual.
| 12 | 6 | "Gonna Make You Sweat" | Unknown | Unknown | December 12, 2020 | TBA | 0.145 |
All that TV time is making the gang flabby, so they embark on a workout regimen.
