= Teri Copley =

American actress (born 1961)

- Born: May 10, 1961 (age 65); United States
- Occupation: Actress
- Years active: 1980–2017
- Known for: We Got It Made; I Had Three Wives; I Married a Centerfold; Brain Donors
- Children: 2

Teri Copley (born May 10, 1961) is an American former actress. She is known for her role on the NBC and syndicated television series We Got It Made, which premiered in 1983, co-starred on the 1985 CBS television series I Had Three Wives, and appeared as a panelist in the 1989 pilot for Match Game 90. She appeared in the 1984 television film I Married a Centerfold and the 1992 film Brain Donors.

== Personal life ==
Copley posed nude and was the cover girl for Playboy for the November 1990 issue. In the 1990s, she became a born-again Christian and left Hollywood.

In 2003, she released a book about her faith, entitled Conversations Between a Girl and Her God.

In 2018, Copley appeared on the Dr. Phil television series seeking help for her adult daughter Ashley, whose boyfriend Hector was accused by Copley of being physically abusive.

== Filmography ==
Film
Year	Title	Role	Notes
1980	New Year's Evil	Teenage Girl	
1989	Transylvania Twist	Marissa Orlock	
1990	Down the Drain	Kathy Miller	
1992	Brain Donors	Tina	
1992	Frozen Assets	Peaches	
1996	R.I.O.T.: The Movie	Jewel Richards	Direct-to-video
2014	Redeemed	Beth	
2016	Merrily	Caroline	never completed

Television
Year	Title	Role	Notes
1981	Fantasy Island	Joanne	Episode: "The Man from Yesterday/World's Most Desirable Woman"
1981	The Star Maker	Angel Parker	TV movie
1981	Fly Away Home	Sabrina	TV movie
1984	Glitter		Episode: "Pilot"
1984	I Married a Centerfold	Debra Bryan	TV movie
1985	Gus Brown and Midnight Brewster	Rayline	TV movie
1985	I Had Three Wives	Samantha Collins Beaudine	Main cast
1984, 1986	The Love Boat	Tracy Hayes, Donna Louise Bedford	3 episodes
1983–1988	We Got It Made	Mickey McKenzie	Main cast
1988	In the Line of Duty: The F.B.I. Murders	Vickie	TV movie
1989	Quantum Leap	Dixie	Episode: "The Right Hand of God – October 24, 1974"
1989	Monsters	Vanessa Solo	Episodes: "Rain Dance"
1990	Sporting Chance	Agnes Ockleman	TV movie
1991	Murder, She Wrote	Brenda McCoy	Episode: "Where Have You Gone, Billy Boy?"
1991	Hunter	Traci	Episode: "Ex Marks the Spot"
1991	The Gambler Returns: The Luck of the Draw	Daisy McKee	TV movie
1992	Blossom	Glenda Dudley	Episode: "Driver's Education"
2017	Enforcer	Chamele	Episode: "Battered"
