= Women's Steering Committee of the Directors Guild of America =

Women's Steering Committee of the Directors Guild of America was founded in 1979 by six women members of the Directors Guild of America (DGA). Its purpose was to investigate the employment opportunities and hiring practices of film studios. The founding members, known as the Original Six, were Lynne Littman, Susan Bay, Nell Cox, Victoria Hochberg, Joelle Dobrow, and Dolores Ferraro.

The members' investigation led them to file a class-action lawsuit against the studios in the 1980s. However, on March 5, 1985, the case was dismissed before there had been any significant legal activity when the judge removed the DGA as the class representative.

Despite this legal setback, the Committee over the years was able to increase the employment of women directors from 0.5% in 1985 to 16% in 1995.

The members' investigation and lawsuit is referenced and explored in the 2018 documentary film, This Changes Everything.

== See also ==
- Original Six (directors)
