= Neil Garguilo =

American writer and producer

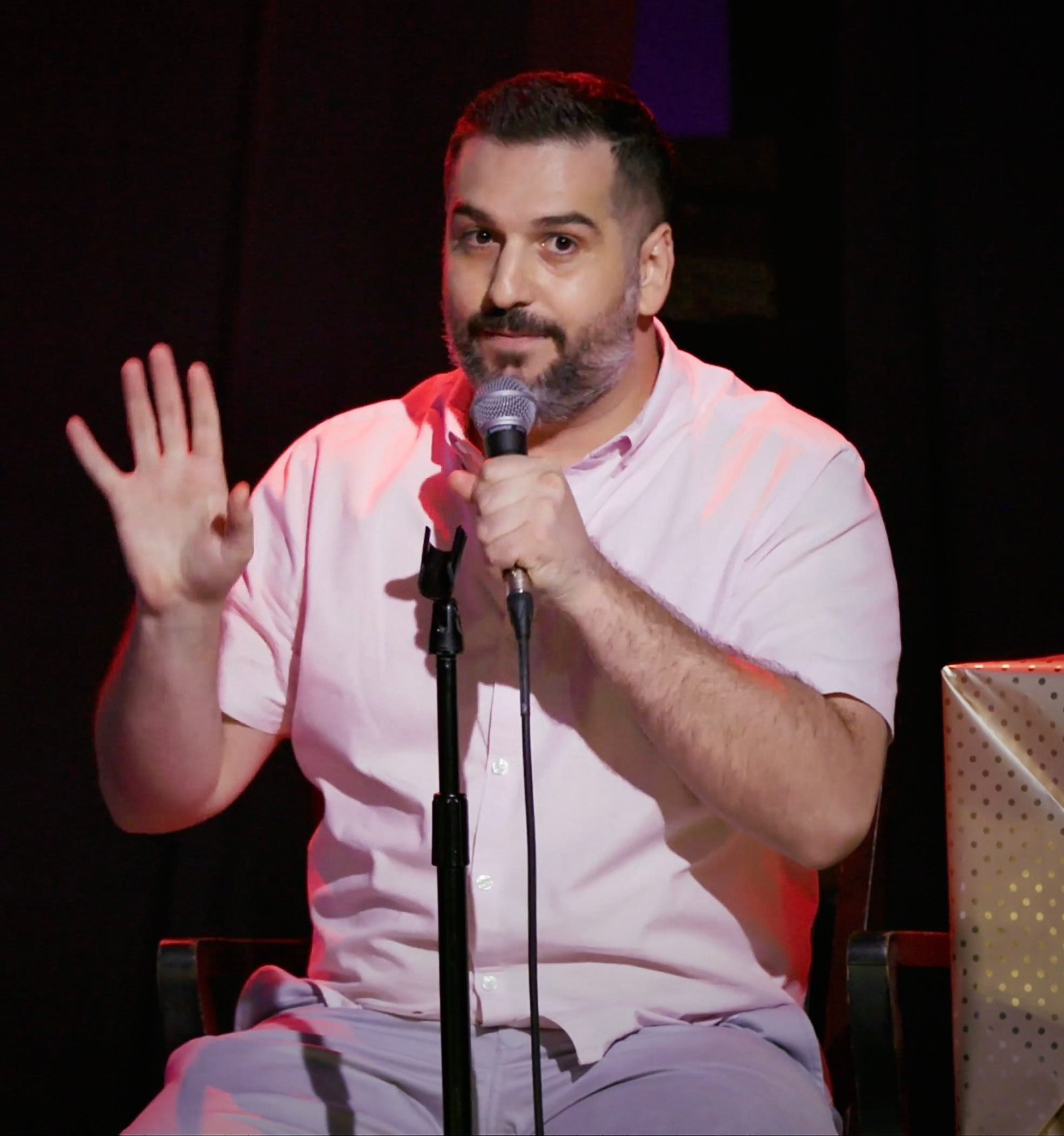
- Neil Garguilo at Dynasty Typewriter in 2019
- Born: Neil William Garguilo; April 14, 1982 (age 44); New Brunswick, New Jersey, United States
- Education: Pace University
- Occupations: Writer; producer; director; actor; comedian
- Partner: Kristin Sanchez

Neil William Garguilo (born April 14, 1982) is an American writer, producer, director, actor and improv comedian. He is also a lyricist, writing musical comedy for television and film.

Garguilo was co-creator, showrunner and star of the Syfy original animated series Hell Den. He also appeared on all five seasons of the MTV hit comedy series Awkward, and regularly works with Funny or Die and members of the comedy group Broken Lizard.

He is the founding member of the celebrated improv comedy group Dr. God, the group responsible for the 2015 horror-comedy Bloodsucking Bastards, starring Pedro Pascal and Fran Kranz.

In 2020, Garguilo won a Daytime Emmy Award for his Funny or Die series Brainwashed By Toons. He was nominated twice for the series and shares an Emmy Award with Seinfeld star Jason Alexander.

== Early life ==
Garguilo was born in New Brunswick, New Jersey. He attended Spotswood High School and is a graduate of Pace University. While in college, he also attended the New York Film Academy and performed stand-up comedy regularly at the New York Comedy Club.

== Career ==
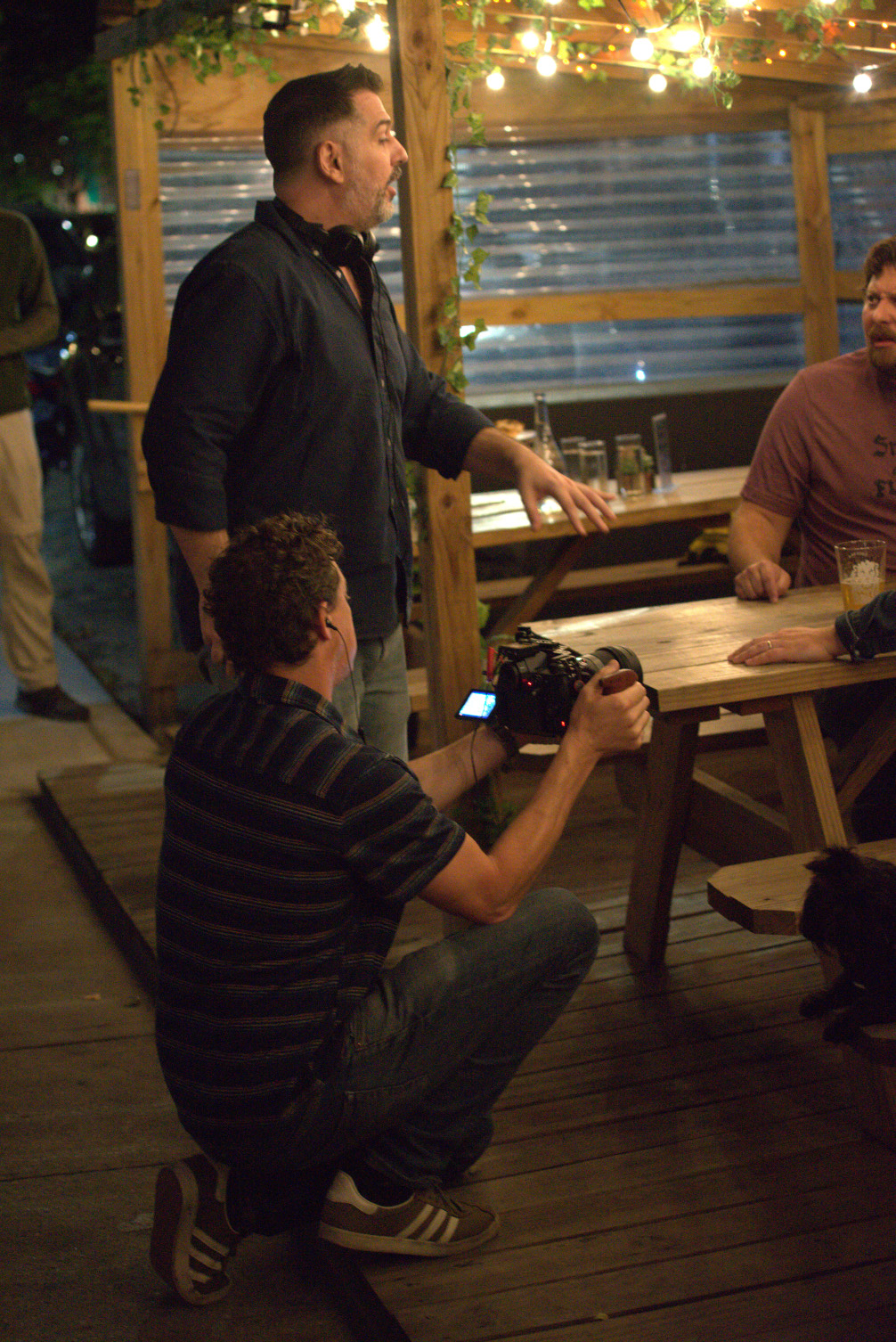
Neil Garguilo in Queens, New York in 2025

After college, Garguilo attended the Lee Strasberg Theater Institute and studied improv comedy at Upright Citizens Brigade (New York and Los Angeles), iO West, Second City Hollywood and the Pack Theater.

His television career started at TV Guide Network as an assistant on the John Henson television series Watch This. From there, Garguilo would work on and off camera for years before landing the role of Principal Cox on the hit MTV series Awkward.

In 2014, he created his first television series MOCKpocalpyse which aired for three seasons on the Mark Cuban-owned cable network AXS TV. This talking-head comedy series featured comics such as Steve Agee, Nate Bargatze, Mary Birdsong, Frangela, Kevin Heffernan, Dave Holmes, Jamie Kaler, Michael Kosta, Steve Lemme, Jimmy Pardo, Emo Philips, Catherine Reitman, Sam Richardson, Brody Stevens, Ryan Stout and more.

In 2019, Garguilo launched his production company Rafael Raffaele Entertainment. Through his company, Garguilo created his first animated television series Hell Den alongside the members of his comedy group Dr. God. He serves as showrunner, director and stars as Andrew in addition to playing dozens of sketch characters.

Also, through his company, Garguilo created, directed, wrote and produced his 2019 Funny or Die digital series Brainwashed by Toons, featuring songs with Jason Alexander, Wayne Brady and Lea Thompson. He made the series with longtime collaborators Dwayne Colbert and Gregory James Jenkins. For his work, he won Outstanding Original Song and was nominated for Outstanding Writing for a Special Class Series at the 47th Annual Daytime Emmy Awards.

== Personal life ==
Garguilo is of Puerto Rican and Italian descent.

In 2019, he was engaged to voice actress and producer Kristin Sanchez.

== Filmography ==
=== Television ===
Year	Title	Credits	Notes
2010	The Bold and the Beautiful	Beat Cop	1 episode
2011	Attack of the Show	Johnny Planking Champion	1 episode
2011–2015	Awkward	Principal Cox	9 episodes
2012	Stevie TV	Police Officer #1	1 episode
2013–2014	Foursome: Walk of Shame	Self	13 episodes
2014	AXS TV's Super Party Super Special	Self; Executive Producer	1 episode
2014–2015	MOCKpocalpyse	Self; Co-Creator; Executive Producer; Director	25 episodes
2016	Almost Genius	Director	22 episodes
2017	Casandra French's Finishing School	Tor Helberg	1 episode
2016–2017	Greatest Ever	Producer	21 episodes
2017	Clickbait	Consulting Producer	20 episodes
2019	Tacoma FD	Dispatcher Ken	1 episode
2019–present	Hell Den	Andrew; Co-Creator; Executive Producer; Writer; Director	12 episodes
2020	Conan	Fake Masks Narrator	1 episode
2021–2022	Madagascar: A Little Wild	Eddie	3 episodes
2022	The Book of Queer	lyricist: theme song / lyricist: original song	5 episodes
2023	Adventures in Odyssey	Terry Blaze	1 episode

=== Film ===
Year	Title	Credits
2009	Dead Air	Colleague #2
2015	Bloodsucking Bastards	Mike; Co-Writer (as Dr. God)
2017	From Jennifer	Gavin Trask
2018	Super Troopers 2	Grocery Driver
2021	Donny's Bar Mitzvah	Vaal Dh'o
2024	Unicorn Boy	various voices/Producer p.g.a

=== Digital ===
Year	Title	Series	Credits	Notes
2008	Sketch Toons	Strike TV	Various Voices	1 episode
2010	Electric Spoofaloo	Take 180	The Situation	1 episode
2014	Fist-Man: Strongest of the Slab-Bodied Slab Lords	Adult Swim	Announcer	1 episode
2015–2017	Throwback	Clevver	Executive Producer; Director	62 episodes
2019	Take It Outside	Funny or Die	Director; Writer	8 episodes
2019	Brainwashed By Toons	Funny or Die	Creator; Writer; Director; Executive Producer	3 episodes

== Albums ==
Year	Album	Credits
2022	Book of Queer Soundtrack	lyrics (3 songs)
2024	White Collar Prison	book and lyrics

== Awards and nominations ==
Year	Association	Category	Nominated work	Result
2020	The Webby Awards	Online Film & Video: Weird	Hell Den	Nominated
2020	Daytime Emmy Awards	Outstanding Writing for a Special Class Series	Brainwashed By Toons	Nominated
2020	Daytime Emmy Awards	Outstanding Original Song	Brainwashed By Toons: The Bad Guys?	Won
2021	Voice Arts Awards	Best Director – TV or Film	Hell Den	Won
2021	The Webby Awards	Arts & Experimental	Pinocchio	Honoree
2021	The Webby Awards	Video Remixes / Mashups	Pinocchio	Honoree
2023	Film Threat Award This!	Best Indie Animated Feature	Unicorn Boy	Nominated
2023	Daytime Emmy Awards	Main Title	Book of Queer	Nominated
