= Lynne Littman =

American film and television director and producer

- Born: June 26, 1941 (age 85); New York City, New York, U.S.
- Education: Sarah Lawrence College (B.A., 1962); Sorbonne (1960-61)
- Occupations: Director; producer
- Spouse: Taylor Hackford (m. 1977; div. 1987)
- Children: 1
- Relatives: Rio Hackford (stepson)

Lynne Littman (born June 26, 1941) is an American film and television director and producer.

She is best known for directing Testament. She has won several awards including an Academy Award for documentary short film Number Our Days (1976).

Littman was one of the Original Six, a group of women directors who created the Women's Steering Committee of the Directors Guild of America to protest against gender discrimination in Hollywood.

== Early life and education ==
Littman was born June 26, 1941, in New York City. She attended Music & Art High School and Sarah Lawrence College, and graduated with a Bachelor of Arts degree in 1962. She also studied at the Sorbonne from 1960 to 1961.

== Career ==
Littman began her career in the industry by working as a secretary for WNET (New York). In the following years she worked at a number of freelance jobs in different areas of film. It was until the 1970s when she began working for National Education Television. It is here that she began to explore her future in film journalism.

Commonly she worked with Mort Silverstein, who was known for having a passion for hard-hitting news practices. They made a follow-up documentary to Edward R. Murrow's Harvest of Shame, titled What Harvest for the Reaper. She made several award-winning documentary shorts, including The Matter of Kenneth (1973). Her most notable short documentary film was Number Our Days (1976), based on the field work of anthropologist Barbara Myerhoff; this film received an Academy Award in 1977.

Littman's first feature film was Testament (1983), about a family struggling to survive after a nuclear fallout. The film is based on a short story titled "The Last Testament" by Carol Amen. Littman had been reading the story with her son when she had the idea to adapt it. Many had wanted to obtain the film; however, Littman had managed to secure the rights first. She immediately went about trying to find money for the film. Eventually, a producer at PBS' American Playhouse gave her $500,000 for a 60-minute movie that would involve no studio interference. However, the budget had to be expanded to $750,000 when the screenwriter turned in a script for a 90-minute film that was well received by all involved. Littman stated how proud she was that the film was completed under budget, yet the editing process had taken five months longer than the standard television film. The film was a success upon release and garnered an Academy Award nomination for its lead actress Jane Alexander.

Following Testament, Littman made films infrequently. In 1999, she made two films: Freak City, and Having Our Say, which were aired on television on the same day and in the same time-slot.

Littman has won four Los Angeles Emmy Awards, from 1972 to 1974, and in 1977. She has received nominations for four Cine Golden Eagles for Running My Way (1982) and In Her Own Time (1985).

== Personal life ==
Littman was married to Taylor Hackford from 1977 to 1987. She has one child, Alexander Hackford, as well as a stepson, Rio Hackford. In 1985 she took a ten-year hiatus from film making to raise her child. During the 1980s and 1990s Littman served on the advisory board of the National Student Film Institute.

== Archive ==
Littman's moving image collection is held at the Academy Film Archive. The archive preserved her film Number Our Days in 2007.

== Filmography ==
Year	Title	Role	Notes
1973	In the Matter of Kenneth		
1976	Number Our Days		
1980	Once a Daughter		
1983	Testament		
1985	In Her Own Time		
1996	Cagney & Lacey: True Convictions		TV Movie
1999	Freak City		TV Movie
1999	Having Our Say: The Delany Sisters' First 100 Years		
2003	Testament at 20		

== Awards and nominations ==
Year	Award	Category	Film	Result	Notes
1977	Academy Awards	Best Documentary Short Film	Number Our Days	Won	
1982	Cine Golden Eagle		Running My Way	Nominated	
1985	Cine Golden Eagle		In Her Own Time	Nominated	
