= Victoria Hochberg =

American film director

- Born: Victoria Greene Hochberg; December 24, 1952 (age 73); United States
- Education: Antioch College, B.A. 1974
- Occupations: Film, television director, writer
- Years active: 1975–present

Victoria Greene Hochberg (born December 24, 1952) is an American film and television director and writer. She was one of the Original Six, a group of women directors who created the Women's Steering Committee of the Directors Guild of America, to protest against gender discrimination in Hollywood.

== Education ==
Victoria Greene Hochberg graduated from Antioch College in 1974 with a Bachelor of Arts in history.

== Career ==
She directed episodes of Doogie Howser, M.D., The Trials of Rosie O'Neill, Dr. Quinn, Medicine Woman, Touched by an Angel, Models Inc., Melrose Place, Central Park West, Ally McBeal, Honey, I Shrunk the Kids: The TV Show, Sex and the City, Cold Feet, Tucker, The Chris Isaak Show, State of Grace, Kitchen Confidential, Ghost Whisperer, Notes from the Underbelly and Reaper. As well as writing I Married a Centerfold and four episodes of the series Me & Mrs. C.

Hochberg's 1975 short documentary Metroliner was preserved by the Academy Film Archive, in conjunction with New York Women in Film & Television, in 2015.

Hochberg has won two Daytime Emmy Awards for directing ABC Afterschool Special: Just a Regular Kid: An AIDS Story (1988) and the PBS television film Sweet 15 (1990). She has directed music videos for the Eagles and Boz Scaggs.

In 2002, she directed the film Dawg starring Denis Leary and Elizabeth Hurley.
