= Number Our Days =

1976 film

- Directed by: Lynne Littman
- Written by: Lynne Littman; Barbara Myerhoff
- Produced by: Lynne Littman
- Starring: Harry Asimow
- Cinematography: Neil Reichline
- Edited by: Lewis Teague
- Production company: KCET
- Release date: 1976
- Running time: 28 minutes
- Country: United States
- Language: English

Number Our Days is a 1976 American short documentary film about a community of elderly Jews in Venice, California. It was directed by Lynne Littman and aired on KCET's news show 28 Tonight. The Academy Film Archive preserved Number Our Days in 2007.

== Reception and legacy ==
Lee Margulies of the Los Angeles Times called Number Our Days "beautiful" and "a very human film, full of expressive faces and heartfelt emotion. It is full of compassion but never pity." John J. O'Connor of The New York Times wrote that Number Our Days was "a moving portrait of loneliness, pride, humor, bitterness and dignity".

Number Our Days won an Oscar at the 49th Academy Awards, held in 1977, for Documentary Short Subject. Number Our Days was cited when 28 Tonight won an Alfred I. duPont–Columbia University Award in 1978.

It was made available on the Blu-ray edition of Littman's sole 1983 feature Testament by The Criterion Collection March 17, 2026.

== Cast ==
- Harry Asimow as Himself (archive footage)
- Barbara Myerhoff as Herself
- Lynne Littman as Herself (voice) (uncredited)
- Eddie Gurnick as band leader
