= I Had Three Wives =

- Genre: Comedy drama; Mystery
- Starring: Victor Garber; Teri Copley; Shanna Reed; Maggie Cooper; David Faustino
- Country of origin: United States
- Original language: English
- No. of seasons: 1
- No. of episodes: 6 (1 unaired)

Production
- Running time: 60 minutes
- Production company: Warner Bros. Television

Original release
- Network: CBS
- Release: August 14 – September 11, 1985

I Had Three Wives is an American comedy-drama television series that aired on CBS from August 14 to September 11, 1985. The series' lead was Victor Garber in his first starring role on television.

== Plot ==
The series follows Los Angeles-based "eternally romantic" private investigator Jackson Beaudine (Victor Garber) who leverages the skills of his three ex-wives to help solve cases. His first wife, Mary, who has remarried and who also has custody of Jackson's 10-year-old son Andrew, is a lawyer. Second wife, Samantha, is an actress with skills in disguise and martial arts. And his third wife, Liz, is a newspaper reporter with a number of useful contacts.

== Cast ==
=== Main ===
- Victor Garber as Jackson Beaudine
- Teri Copley as Samantha
- Shanna Reed as Liz
- Maggie Cooper as Mary Beaudine Parker
- David Faustino as Andrew Beaudine

=== Recurring ===
- Luis Avalos as Lt. Gomez

== Production ==
Six episodes were produced, but only five episodes were aired during summer 1985 as the pilot episode of the series was never aired. Bill Bixby was among those who directed an episode of the series. I Had Three Wives was one of four television shows that were part of an early experiment by CBS to program original series during summer.

== Episodes ==
No.	Title	Directed by	Original release date	Prod. code
1	"You and I Know"	John Hancock	August 14, 1985	185832
2	"Till Death Do Us Part"	William Wiard	August 21, 1985	185833
3	"Bedtime Stories"	Bob Sweeney	August 28, 1985	185834
4	"The Butterfly Murder"	William Wiard	September 4, 1985	185835
5	"Runaround Sue"	Cliff Bole	September 11, 1985	185831
6	"Pilot"	Bill Bixby	Unaired	206738

== Reception ==
Howard Rosenberg of Los Angeles Times reviewed I Had Three Wives negatively, calling the comedy/mystery series "...thin-plotted idiocy, a sort of citified Sleuths of Hazzard..." Rosenberg later reported that the series earned "weak ratings" during its summer run, which likely damaged its chances for renewal. The final episode of the series, aired on September 13, ranked 53rd for the week of September 9–15, 1985, earning a 10.5 rating.
