= We Got It Made =

- We Got it Made season-two opening title
- Genre: Sitcom
- Created by: Gordon Farr; Lynne Farr Brao
- Written by: Michael S. Baser; Bob Brunner; David Chambers; Chet Dowling; Gordon Farr; Lynne Farr Brao; Jeffrey Ferro; Ken Hecht; Arnold Kane; Sandy Krinski; Susan H. Lee; Bowie Lennon; C.M. Leon; Laura Levine; Chick Mitchell; Geoffrey Neigher; Kim Weiskopf; Margaret Weisman; Fredric Weiss
- Directed by: James R. Drake; Alan Rafkin
- Starring: Teri Copley; Tom Villard; Matt McCoy; John Hillner; Bonnie Urseth; Stepfanie Kramer; Lance Wilson-White; Ron Karabatsos
- Opening theme: "We Got It Made"
- Composer: Tom Wells
- Country of origin: United States
- Original language: English
- No. of seasons: 2
- No. of episodes: 46

Production
- Executive producer: Fred Silverman
- Producers: Lynne Farr Brao; Gordon Farr; Alan Rafkin
- Camera setup: Multi-camera
- Running time: 30 minutes
- Production companies: InterMedia Entertainment Company (1983–1984); The Farr Organization Inc. (1983–1984); MGM/UA Entertainment Co. Television (1983–1984); Twenty Paws Productions (syndicated version; 1987–1988); The Fred Silverman Company (syndicated version; 1987–1988); MGM/UA Television (syndicated version; 1987–1988)

Original release
- Network: NBC
- Release: September 8, 1983 – March 10, 1984
- Network: Syndication
- Release: September 11, 1987 – March 30, 1988

We Got It Made is an American sitcom television series that aired on NBC from September 8, 1983, to March 10, 1984, and in first-run syndication from September 11, 1987, to March 30, 1988. It starred Teri Copley as a woman who works as a maid for two bachelors in New York City, played by Tom Villard and Matt McCoy, who was replaced by John Hillner for the syndicated version. The series was created by Gordon Farr and Lynne Farr Brao (credited as simply Lynne Farr during the 1987–88 season). The executive producer was Fred Silverman.

== Synopsis ==
=== 1983 NBC version ===
The show focuses on Mickey Mackenzie (Teri Copley), a woman in her early 20s who applies for a housekeeping job in Manhattan. Her employers are two bachelors who share the two-bedroom apartment — conservative attorney David Tucker (Matt McCoy) and goofy, idealistic salesman Jay Bostwick (Tom Villard). Mickey is the first — and only — applicant for the job; in fact, both Jay and David are so taken by her beauty that they immediately hire her.

Both David and Jay had girlfriends - David's was attorney Claudia Jones (Stepfanie Kramer, who was no longer on the show after episode #19 and went on to co-star in the hit NBC crime drama Hunter - Villard and Copley would also later appear as guest stars), while Jay dated kindergarten teacher Beth Sorensen (Bonnie Urseth). Both Claudia and Beth were skeptical about their boyfriends having such an attractive maid working and living with them, but they eventually grew to accept Mickey as a friend.

When it first premiered, We Got It Made was successful, winning its time slot early in its run. Before long, ratings for the series began to drop and the show also largely received negative reviews from critics. NBC moved the series from its original Thursday night slot to Saturday nights in January 1984, but the change did little to improve the ratings. In March 1984, We Got It Made was cancelled.

=== 1987 syndicated version ===
After being cancelled in 1984, We Got It Made was revived three years later, for first-run syndication, for the 1987–1988 season as part of NBC's "Prime Time Begins at 7:30" campaign. With this campaign, the network's owned-and-operated stations ran first-run sitcoms in the 7:30–8:00 pm ET/PT (6:30–7:00 pm CT) time slot to counterprogram competing stations' game shows, sitcom reruns, and other offerings. The sitcom was picked up by some non-NBC stations as well, and while available in many markets, the sitcom was not available in all large or medium markets for syndication.

Teri Copley and Tom Villard were the two returning cast members. The characters of Jay and Beth were no longer a couple as Bonnie Urseth was not in the syndicated version. The character of David was now played by actor John Hillner. Mickey, Jay, and David had new neighbors as well —policeman Max Papavasiolios Sr. (Ron Karabatsos) and his son, Max Jr. (Lance Wilson-White). Mickey seemed to allow greater physical attention — and affection - from the now-single Jay and David, but at the same time, she doted on them as if they were her young sons. She also had a special relationship with teenaged Max, who frequently came to her for romantic advice, although he would have also preferred putting that advice to use on Mickey.

As they had with the NBC run, critics lambasted the series and due to low ratings, We Got It Made lasted only one season in syndication. The series' final original episode was released on March 30, 1988, with reruns airing until the week of September 3, 1988, in many markets.

== Cast ==
We Got it Made first-season cast photo featuring Villard, Copley and McCoy.

- Teri Copley as Mickey Mackenzie
- Tom Villard as Jay Bostwick
- Matt McCoy as David Tucker (1983–1984)
- Bonnie Urseth as Beth Sorensen (1983–1984)
- Stepfanie Kramer as Claudia Jones (1983–1984)
- John Hillner as David Tucker (1987–1988)
- Ron Karabatsos as Max Papavasilios Sr. (1987–1988)
- Lance Wilson-White as Max Papavasilios Jr. (1987–1988)

Notable guest stars included Elaine Joyce (as Mickey's mother), Edie McClurg, Julie Brown, Scatman Crothers, Alice Ghostley, Richard Paul, Billie Bird, Joel Brooks, Jack Bannon, Peggy Pope, and Jean Kasem.

== NBC ratings ==
Season	Episodes	Start date	End date	Nielsen rank	Nielsen rating	Tied with
1983–84	22	September 8, 1983	March 10, 1984	73	12.8	Ripley's Believe It Or Not

== Syndicated stations (1987-88) ==
City	Station
Baltimore	WNUV-TV
Boston	WBZ-TV
Chicago	WMAQ-TV
Cleveland	WKYC-TV
Columbus	WCMH-TV
Dallas	WFAA-TV
Detroit	WJBK-TV
Houston	KPRC-TV
Indianapolis	WRTV
Johnstown	WWCP-TV
Las Vegas	KVVU-TV
Los Angeles	KNBC
Miami	WDZL
New Haven	WTNH
New York	WNBC-TV
Orlando	WFTV
Philadelphia	WCAU-TV
Pittsburgh	WPGH-TV
Rochester	WOKR
Sacramento	KCRA-TV
Saint Louis	KPLR-TV
Saint Paul	KSTP-TV
San Antonio	KABB
San Diego	KGTV
Tampa	WTVT
Toledo	WUPW
Washington, D.C.	WRC-TV
West Palm Beach	WFLX

== Episode list ==
=== Season 1: 1983–84 ===
No. overall	No. in season	Title	Directed by	Written by	Original release date	Prod. code
1	1	"Pilot"	Alan Rafkin	Gordon Farr & Lynne Farr Brao	September 8, 1983	3120
2	2	"Mickey Sleepwalks"	Alan Rafkin	Chick Mitchell & Geoffrey Neigher	September 15, 1983	3126
3	3	"The Boyfriend"	Alan Rafkin	Gordon Farr & Lynne Farr Brao	September 22, 1983	3127
4	4	"Mickey Goes Topless"	Alan Rafkin	Laura Levine	September 29, 1983	3129
5	5	"David's Birthday"	Alan Rafkin	Jeffrey Ferro & Fredric Weiss	October 13, 1983	3124
6	6	"Mickey the Shoplifter"	Alan Rafkin	Gordon Farr & Lynne Farr Brao	October 20, 1983	3122
7	7	"Mickey's Mom"	Alan Rafkin	Laura Levine	October 27, 1983	3128
8	8	"Mickey Gets Married: Part 1"	Alan Rafkin	Story by : Lynne Farr Brao; Teleplay by : Gordon Farr	November 3, 1983	3129
9	9	"Mickey Gets Married: Part 2"	Alan Rafkin	Chick Mitchell & Geoffrey Neigher	November 10, 1983	3130
10	10	"The Super"	Unknown	Unknown	November 17, 1983	3131
11	11	"Am I Blue?"	Alan Rafkin	Arnold Kane	November 24, 1983	3121
12	12	"Mickey's T-shirt"	Alan Rafkin	Arnold Kane	December 1, 1983	3132
13	13	"Sexiest Bachelor"	Alan Rafkin	David Chambers	December 8, 1983	3123
14	14	"Mickey's Misconception"	Alan Rafkin	Sandy Krinski & Chet Dowling	January 7, 1984	3134
15	15	"Mickey's Poster"	Alan Rafkin	Susan H. Lee	January 14, 1984	3135
16	16	"The Other Tucker"	Alan Rafkin	Kim Weiskopf & Michael S. Baser	January 21, 1984	3136
17	17	"The Break-up: Part 1"	Jim Drake	Bob Brunner & Ken Hecht	February 4, 1984	3137
18	18	"The Break-up: Part 2"	Jim Drake	Gordon Farr, Chick Mitchell & Geoffrey Neigher	February 11, 1984	3138
19	19	"Miss Mom"	Jim Drake	Bowie Lennon	February 18, 1984	3141
20	20	"The Fight"	Jim Drake	Story by : C.M. Leon & Margaret Weisman; Teleplay by : Bowie Lennon	February 25, 1984	3133
21	21	"A Paige in David's Life"	Jim Drake	Gordon Farr	March 3, 1984	3140
22	22	"Mickey Makes the Grade"	Jim Drake	Chick Mitchell & Geoffrey Neigher	March 10, 1984	3139

=== Season 2: 1987–88 ===
No. overall	No. in season	Title	Directed by	Written by	Original release date	Prod. code
23	1	"Instant Family"	Unknown	Unknown	September 11, 1987	201
24	2	"The Three Faces of Mickey"	Unknown	Unknown	September 18, 1987	203
25	3	"And David Makes Three"	Unknown	Unknown	September 25, 1987	207
26	4	"Mickey Meet Mr. Right?"	Unknown	Unknown	October 2, 1987	202
27	5	"Hello, Dolly"	Unknown	Unknown	October 16, 1987	204
28	6	"Prisoner of Love"	Unknown	Unknown	October 30, 1987	210
29	7	"On the Ropes"	Dennis Steinmetz	Ken Kuta	November 6, 1987	212
30	8	"The Naked Truth"	Unknown	Unknown	November 13, 1987	215
31	9	"Man Around the House"	Unknown	Unknown	December 4, 1987	208
32	10	"Upstairs, Downstairs" "Christmas Clip Show"	Unknown	Unknown	December 11, 1987	224
33	11	"A Dog's Life"	Unknown	Unknown	December 25, 1987	218
34	12	"Save the Last Dance for Me"	Unknown	Unknown	January 8, 1988	219
35	13	"Mickey Times Two"	Unknown	Unknown	January 15, 1988	220
36	14	"Fatal Distraction"	Unknown	Unknown	January 20, 1988	222
37	15	"Jay's on the Roof"	Unknown	Unknown	January 27, 1988	221
38	16	"Centerfold Mickey"	Unknown	Unknown	February 3, 1988	223
39	17	"Confidence Man"	Unknown	Unknown	February 10, 1988	217
40	18	"Not for Love or Money"	Unknown	Unknown	February 17, 1988	216
41	19	"La Vie en Jay: Part 1"	Unknown	Unknown	February 24, 1988	213
42	20	"La Vie en Jay: Part 2"	Unknown	Unknown	March 2, 1988	214
43	21	"Four Loves Have I"	Unknown	Unknown	March 9, 1988	211
44	22	"Crime Busters"	Unknown	Unknown	March 16, 1988	205
45	23	"Temporary Mickey"	Unknown	Unknown	March 23, 1988	206
46	24	"Video Mickey"	Unknown	Unknown	March 30, 1988	209

== See also ==
- List of programs broadcast by NBC
