= Don't Talk to Strangers (film) =

- Genre: Crime; Thriller
- Written by: Neill D. Hicks; Jon George; Nevin Schreiner
- Directed by: Robert Lewis
- Starring: Pierce Brosnan; Shanna Reed; Terry O'Quinn
- Music by: Joseph Conlan
- Country of origin: United States
- Original language: English

Production
- Executive producer: Barry J. Weitz
- Producer: Tom Rowe
- Production location: Port Coquitlam, British Columbia
- Cinematography: Richard Leiterman
- Editor: Andrew London
- Running time: 90 min.
- Production companies: Barry Weitz Films; MCA Television Entertainment; Pacific Motion Pictures

Original release
- Release: August 11, 1994

Don't Talk to Strangers (also known as Dangerous Pursuit) is a 1994 made-for-TV psychological thriller film. It was directed by Robert Lewis and starred Pierce Brosnan.

== Plot ==
The unhappy marriage of Jane (Shanna Reed) and her alcoholic policeman husband Bonner (Terry O'Quinn) leads to divorce and Jane get custody for their son. Soon, she meets a gentleman in her workplace, after a few weeks they fall in love and get married. Gentleman Douglas Patrick Brody (Pierce Brosnan) and his new wife Jane Brody attempt to build a new life, and move to a new state. However, the former husband follows them. This is just a beginning of the story filled with suspense and surprises. As it turns out, Patrick is the villain behind a number of crimes.
