= Nina Morgan-Jones =

Welsh fashion designer

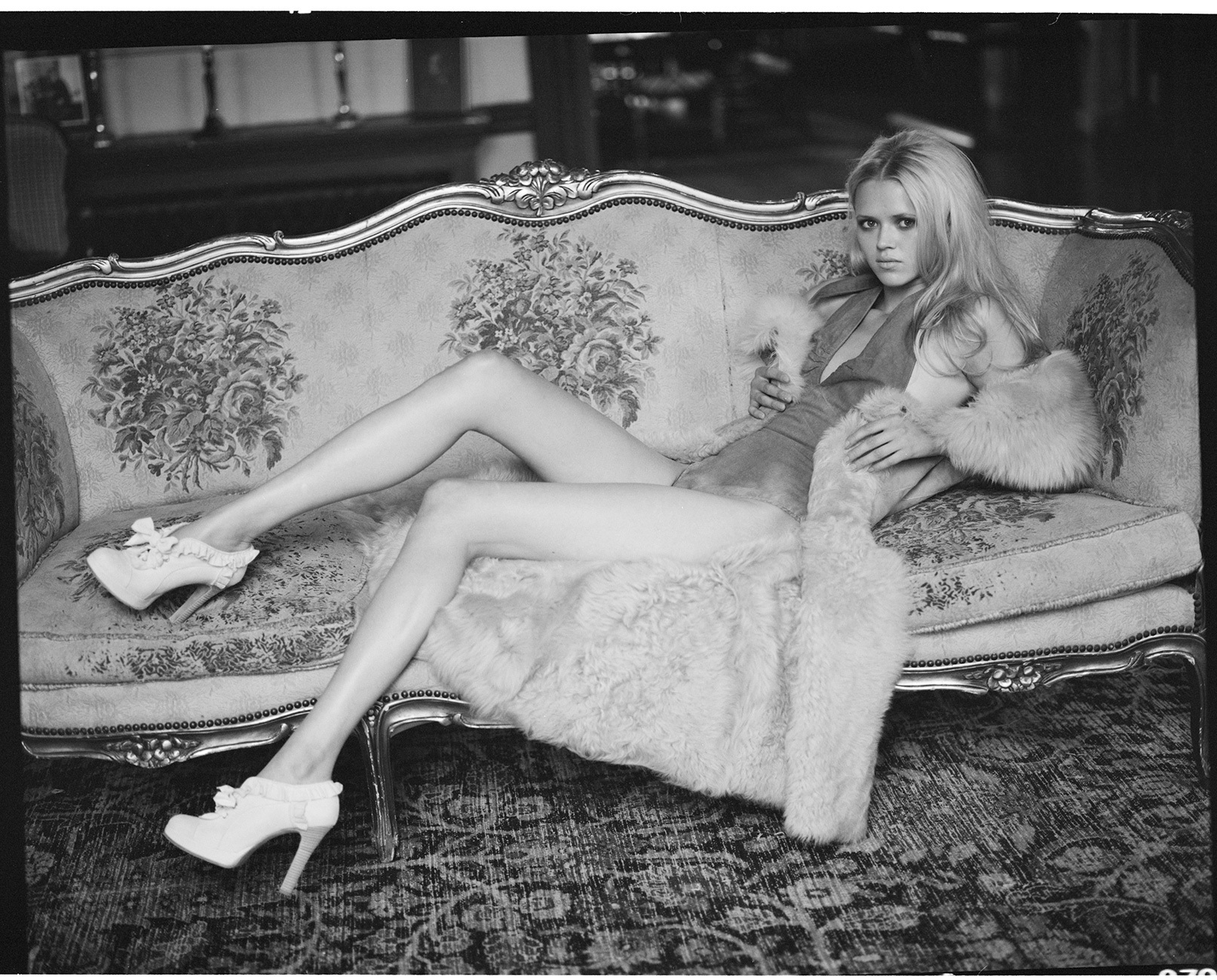

Nina Morgan-Jones (born in South Wales) is a London/Hollywood based fashion designer and stylist and co-founder of the fashion Company ROMP.

== Biography ==
At the age of 24, her fashion collection was first showcased during London Fashion Week and later sold in the salons of Prêt-à-Porter (Paris), Atmosphere (Paris) and The Train (New York and Japan).

Morgan-Jones’ style is inspired by the 30s, film noir and 1970's London.

ROMP was successful internationally as a natural products brand, selling leather, sheepskin, and silk clothing. In 2007, ROMP teamed up with a European tannery and produced an organic collection of Soil Association Certified Organic leather and denim clothing and accessories. Morgan-Jones collaborated with organic pioneer Greg Sturmer on the development of the collection.

ROMP was the subject of a BBC world documentary and Morgan-Jones’ designs have been featured in magazines such as Elle, Vogue, Marie Claire and Condé Nast Traveller.

Her designs have since been commissioned by Hollywood shows such as American Idol and Melrose Place and have been featured on the red carpet and on stage for events like the MTV Video Music Awards and the Academy Awards.

ROMP opened its first USA boutique in 2008 on West 3rd Street, Los Angeles. She lives between London, Los Angeles and St Tropez, working on the Romp Boutique Collection and as a freelance design consultant.
