= Barbara Myerhoff =

American filmmaker and anthropologist (1935–1985)

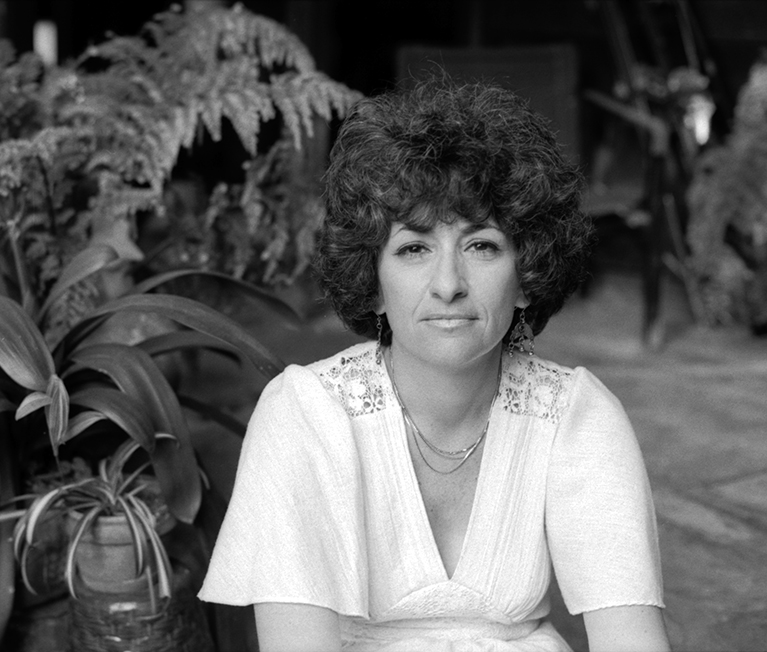
- Born: Barbara Gay Siegel; February 16, 1935; Cleveland, Ohio, U.S.
- Died: January 7, 1985 (aged 49); Burbank, California, U.S.
- Education: University of California, Los Angeles
- Occupations: Anthropologist, filmmaker
- Spouse: Lee Myerhoff (m. 1954; div. 1982)

Barbara Myerhoff (February 16, 1935 – January 7, 1985) was an American anthropologist, filmmaker, and founder of the Center for Visual Anthropology at the University of Southern California.

== Biography ==
Barbara Myerhoff was born on February 16, 1935, in Cleveland, Ohio.

When Myerhoff was a teenager, she moved with her mother and stepfather from Cleveland to Los Angeles.

In 1958, she received a BA in sociology from the University of California and an MA in Human Development from the University of Chicago in 1963. She then entered UCLA's Anthropology PhD program. At UCLA, Hilda Kuper, a student of Malinowski, became a beloved teacher of Myerhoff. Myerhoff and Kuper would remain friends and correspondents throughout her life. As many anthropologists who practiced in the 1960s and 1970s, Myerhoff was influenced by Victor Turner, Claude Levi-Strauss, Clifford Geertz, Mary Douglas, Mircea Eliade, Max Gluckman, Arnold Van Gennep, Alan Watts, and C.G. Jung, all of whom wrote on symbolic systems of ritual, myth, and religious cosmology.

== Anthropology PhD dissertation ==
In 1968, Myerhoff received her PhD in anthropology from UCLA for her dissertation on Huichol ritual form Myerhoff began her fieldwork with the Huichol Indians of Northern Mexico in 1965 while a graduate student. She and her colleague Peter Furst became the first non-Huichol people to embark on the peyote hunt, an annual ritual pilgrimage to the sacred land of Wirikuta in search of peyote, a hallucinogenic cactus plant. Myerhoff interpreted this rite to be a recovery of the Huichol peoples' original condition of oneness; she viewed this quest as universal and understood the peyote hunt to be one example among many "returns to paradise." As she explained, "the peyote hunt provides one version of the fulfillment of a panhuman quest—the desire for total unity among all creatures and all people—and accordingly we find in it significance beyond the specificity of Huichol religion and world view."

Although Myerhoff argued for universal application of the peyote hunt's symbolic meaning, the study itself was deliberately narrow. Myerhoff primarily sought to understand "how the deer-maize-peyote symbols and the peyote hunt rituals gave meaning to Huichol life." She explained that choosing to work with Ramon, a religious leader who served as intermediary between Huichol people and Gods or outsiders, precluded her from spending comparable time with other Huichol people. She noted, therefore, that her account of the peyote hunt and the deer and maize rituals was not an account of Huchiol culture, religious cosmology, or even the definitive word on the peyote ritual, but rather, was her interpretation of Ramon's interpretation. By positioning herself as an interpreter of an interpreter, she maintained a subjective voice and ethic. Simultaneously, she asserted that her main purpose was to document the "native model" and to salvage the rituals of an endangered people. Through engaged participant observation, constant verification, and correction, she tried to stay as close to Ramon's meaning as she could. Nevertheless, through narrative style she maintained the dialogue between herself, Ramon, and his wife Lupe throughout the book so that she, alongside them, was an observable character. The final book, Peyote Hunt: The Sacred Journey of the Huichol Indians, published in 1974, was nominated for a National Book Award.

== Professor ==
In 1976, Myerhoff became a full professor at USC and chair of the Anthropology Department; she headed the department until 1980.

== Number Our Days (1976) ==
Myerhoff began fieldwork in 1972 with elderly Jews at the Israel Levin Center in Venice, California, supported by a five-year grant from the National Science Foundation given to the Andrus Gerontology Center at the USC. The project included an anthropological component that Myerhoff took part in. Her project was one of six with themes of "aging as a career, the concern with continuity, and significant sex differences in aging." Myerhoff addressed all of these themes in her essays and book, Number Our Days.

Myerhoff explained that the aged created rituals to ensure continuity and assert their voices and visibility. In one of her essays about the aged, "A Symbol Perfected in Death: Continuity and Ritual in the Life and Death of an Elderly Jew," she described one of the center member's death at his birthday party. Jacob, one of the oldest, most-beloved center member, arranged for an annual largely attended birthday party. The party was highly organized and Jacob, a writer, would always present a speech about the meaning he found in life and aging. The last year, Jacob asked the community to continue to celebrate his birthday five years after his death. After speaking he died. Myerhoff explained that because Jacob framed his own death the community had the tools by which to make meaning of his death at his party. The surprise of Jacob's death strengthened his birthday ritual. The elders continued to celebrate Jacob's birthday party and remembered the magical experience of his perfect death among his friends. In writing Jacob's story Myerhoff took part in continuing his life and vision.

During this time, in 1976, she completed the film version of Number Our Days with director Lynne Littman. The film, Myerhoff explained, would not deal with the complexities of the center's conflicts, but rather showed the elders at their best. She wanted to give back to the elders what they had generously given her and gain for them some of the positive visibility they sought. That year, Number Our Days won an Oscar for best short documentary, increasing public interest in the center.

The book Number Our Days came out in 1979 and received rave reviews. It was included as one of the year's ten best Social Science books by the New York Times. As in Peyote Hunt, Myerhoff chose one main male informant, Shmuel, who for her possessed worldly intelligence, self-reflection, and insightful community interpretation. Notably, while Myerhoff celebrated the uneducated female elders' zest for life and survival skills, she chose highly educated male leaders as primary informants. Throughout her work she maintained that women and men had their respective cultures born from their gendered social roles.

In Number Our Days, Myerhoff uniquely combined social science analysis and narrative story telling. In the book's introduction, she reflected that she did not recognize Number Our Days as a traditional anthropological text because she wove the elders' voices seamlessly into the study and placed herself alongside them as another character. These choices broke new ground in anthropological reflexivity and transparency. As a result of the book's popularity, Myerhoff began to teach workshops on performance, life histories, ritual, and storytelling at NYU and the Hunter/Brookdale Center for the Aging.

Myerhoff continued her work with the elders of the center until 1981. In 1980, she organized "Life not Death in Venice," an ambitious art exhibit at USC featuring the work of elderly Jewish artists. The elders created this title as a pun, taken from the novella Death in Venice by Thomas Mann, for their protest march for safer streets after a reckless biker killed one of the center's members. In addition to the film, book, and art exhibit, in 1981, Myerhoff helped adapt Number Our Days for the stage, written by Suzanne Grossmann, directed by John Hirsch, and performed at the Mark Taper Forum. In her essay "Surviving Stories: Reflections on Number Our Days," she described the ways the elders responded to their newfound publicity and their constant negotiations for control over their representation.

Myerhoff told of the inconsolable senior, Manya, who could not forgive her for leaving her out of the film, and of Rebekkah, who initially, would not sign the play's release form unless her and her husband's real names were used. To win them over, Myerhoff argued and cajoled, telling them that the increased publicity would bring more opportunity for them and other seniors. She also gave gifts and companionship so that they would work with her. Reflecting upon these negotiations, Myerhoff concluded that the seniors would rather be represented in ways they did not completely agree with, than not represented at all. Myerhoff revealed that decisions of subject representation required continual negotiation. By explicating the power relations in her collaboration with the seniors, after Number Our Days was published, she further revealed the book's constructions and shed light upon the politics of representation in the anthropologist/subject encounter. During this time, Myerhoff developed a graduate program in visual anthropology and made it the emphasis of the anthropology program She then harnessed departmental support to start the first master's degree program in visual anthropology. In this program she collaborated with the USC film school and offered courses in film production along with anthropological theory. She also recruited the noted ethnographic filmmaker Timothy Asch to teach at USC.

== In Her Own Time (1985) ==
Myerhoff's next and last project began in 1982 with studying and filming the Jewish community in the Fairfax District, Los Angeles. Initially, she intended to focus on the Russian Jewish community and the ways these Jews adopted observance, as compared to a variety of Jewish identity groups who lived in that area. In 1984, however, Myerhoff was diagnosed with cancer, and as a result, changed the direction of the project. Instead of focusing solely on the variety of Jews, Myerhoff and collaborator Lynn Littman turned the camera on her own search for healing with the spiritual guidance of the Fairfax District, Los Angeles Lubavitch Hasidic community. She explained that because of her illness, she had to use her work to speak directly to her life. Before she completed the film In Her Own Time, Myerhoff died in Los Angeles of lung cancer on January 7, 1985, at age 49.

== Legacy ==
Throughout her career as an anthropologist, Barbara Myerhoff contributed to major methodological trends which have since become standards of social cultural anthropology. These methods include reflexivity, narrative story telling, and anthropologists' positioning as social activists, commentaries, and critics whose work extends beyond the academy.

== Sofie Mann ==
Her maternal "storytelling grandmother" Sofie Mann, a transformational childhood and adolescent figure for Myerhoff, helped raise her. Myerhoff attributed Sofie Mann's influence to her early appreciation of people's life stories because Mann taught her that if one looked closely, every person had an interesting story. Instilling what would later become Myerhoff's anthropological ideology and method, narrative/storytelling, Sofie Mann also helped prepare her for working with the elderly people at the Aliyah Center in Venice California, the subjects of Number Our Days. When working with the elderly, Myerhoff attended to the details of their words, movements, and feelings. She also discovered that they, like her grandmother, held tightly to stories as their bodies failed them. Myerhoff emphasized that, like her grandmother, their storytelling asserted their love of life and involvement with people, and created an alternative world where they had presence and visibility.

Not only did Myerhoff come to appreciate storytelling from Sofie Mann, she also came to value reflexive method. In Number Our Days, and in the introduction to A Crack in the Mirror, Myerhoff relayed that each day she and her grandmother would sit by a window in her home and tell stories about the people who lived in the adjoining houses. As she explained, "we imaginatively entered in turn, making their stories into a commentary on our own lives." One particularly memorable day of watching out the window began when frost on the window blocked their view. Assuaging Myerhoff's distress, her grandmother made a viewing hole by warming a penny in her palm and pressing it against the window. Seeing the world through a framed narrow perspective deeply moved Myerhoff to begin to think about the significance of isolating, attending to, and framing a piece of life. She described that framing the world outside with her grandmother was the beginning of understanding reflexivity, as reflexivity required attending to the frames of one's habitual perceptions and actions.

== Personal life ==
Myerhoff married Lee Myerhoff (aka Howard L. Myerhoff) in 1954, and together they had two children. They divorced in 1982.

== Works ==
- Peyote Hunt: The Sacred Journey of the Huichol Indians (1974)
- "We Don't Wrap Herring in a Printed Page: Fusions, Fiction and Continuity in Secular Ritual" in Secular Ritual: Forms and Meanings edited by Sally Falk Moore and Barbara Myerhoff (1977)
- "Bobbes and Zeydes: Old and New Roles for Elderly Jews" in Women in Ritual and Symbolic Roles, edited by Judith Hoch-Smith and Anita Springs (1978)
- Number Our Days (1978)
- The Feminization of America: How Women's Values are Changing Our Public and Private Lives, with Elinor Lenz (1986)
- In Her Own Time, with Lynne Littman (1986)
- Remembered Lives: The Work of Ritual, Storytelling, and Growing Older, edited by Mark Kamisky (1992)

== Awards ==
- 1977: Academy Award for Documentary Short Subject for Number Our Days
- 1979: Pushcart Prize for Number Our Days
- 1980: Woman of the Year by the Jewish War Veterans of America

== Filmography ==
- Number Our Days (1976)
- In Her Own Time (1986)

== Bibliography ==
- Myerhoff, Barbara G. (1976). Peyote Hunt: The Sacred Journey of the Huichol Indians. Cornell University Press. ISBN 978-0801491375.
- Myerhoff, Barbara (1992). Kaminsky, Marc (ed.). Remembered Lives: The Work of Ritual, Storytelling, and Growing Older. University of Michigan Press. ISBN 978-0472081776.
- Ruby, Jay (1982). A Crack in the Mirror: Reflexive Perspectives in Anthropology. Introduction by Barbara Myerhoff. University of Pennsylvania Press.
- "JWA Barbara Myerhoff Timeline". Jewish Women's Archive.
- Frank, Gayla (1995). "The Ethnographic Films of Barbara G. Myerhoff: Anthropology, Feminism, and the Politics of Jewish Identity". In Behar, Ruth (ed.). Women Writing Culture. Berkeley: University of California Press. pp. 207–232.
- Myerhoff, Barbara (1988). "Surviving Stories: Reflections on Number Our Days". In Kugelmass, Jack (ed.). Between Two Worlds: Ethnographic Essays on American Jewry. Ithaca and London: Cornell University Press. pp. 265–294.

== See also ==
- Tim Asch
- Jay Ruby
- Stuart Goldman
- Deena Metzger
