= Down the Drain (film) =

- Directed by: Robert C. Hughes
- Written by: Moshe Hadar
- Produced by: Ronnie Hadar
- Starring: Andrew Stevens; Teri Copley; John Matuszak
- Cinematography: James Mathers
- Edited by: Michael Ruscio
- Music by: Rick Krizman
- Production company: Epic Productions
- Distributed by: Sony Pictures Home Entertainment
- Release date: April 25, 1990
- Running time: 105 minutes
- Country: United States
- Language: English

Down the Drain is a 1990 American comedy film. It was directed by Robert C. Hughes and starred Andrew Stevens, Teri Copley and John Matuszak, in his last film after his death. Jerry Mathers and Stella Stevens also appeared in the film. It was released on video April 25, 1990.

== Plot ==
A crooked lawyer brings together some of the clients he's gotten off and schemes to rob a bank vault. However, after the robbery, he discovers that the "goods" he's stolen is actually a top-secret microchip that foreign powers are after, and they will stop at nothing to get it.

== Cast ==
- Andrew Stevens as Victor Scalla
- Teri Copley as Kathy Miller
- John Matuszak as Jed Stewart
- Joseph Campanella as Don Santiago
- Marc Fiorini as Boris (credited as Marco Fiorini)
- Mickey Morton as Jay
- Nick DeMauro as Dino Carpatti
- Barry Neikrug as Tom Dart
- Ken Foree as Buckley
- Sal Lopez as Chico
- Dominic Barto as Louie Girardo
- Irwin Keyes as Patrick
- Don Stroud as Dick Rogers
- Stella Stevens as Sophia
- Leon Martell as Beggar 1
- Benny Urquidez as Beggar 2
- Buddy Daniels Friedman as Peter (credited as Buddy Daniels)
- Lee Benton as Barbara
- Lindy Skyles as Professor
- Margot Hope as Tricia Pagoda
- George Buck Flower as Crane Operator (credited as Buck Flower)
- Gabriele Michel as Baby
- Pedro Gonzalez Gonzalez as Amigo Rodriguez
- Rambo von Dunkelbarger as Police K-9
