= Shanna Reed =

American actress and dancer

- Born: Shanna Herron
- Occupations: Actress; dancer; singer
- Years active: 1980–1999
- Spouse: Terrence O'Hara

Shanna Reed is an American retired actress and dancer. She is best-known for playing Polly Cooper McGillis on the sitcom Major Dad.

== Early years ==
Kansas City, Kansas-born in 1955, Shanna Herron was seven years old when her father, Carl Herron, (1921-1962), a former Marine and POW during WW II, by then an engineer, died in an automobile accident in 1962 near Topeka, Kansas, leaving her mother, Mary Lou (née Thompson; (1928–2014) with five children and pregnant. Within two years she married Marine Corps veteran Tommy Reed (1913–2012), a jazz saxophonist and leader of the Tommy Reed Orchestra. Mary Lou and Tommy Reed had a child, creating a blended family of seven children. Mary Lou Reed taught dancing for Arthur Murray dance studios. After the marriage, the family moved to Phoenix, where Reed grew up. Her mother and stepfather operated a talent-booking agency there, and her mother had another child. Reed attended Arizona State University for a year.

== Career ==
After she left Arizona State, Reed danced at the Tropicana Hotel in Las Vegas, and in 1975 she was one of 12 dancers who, along with a singer, entertained in the Middle East and Europe. After they returned to the United States, she joined the national touring company of A Chorus Line. She also had a replacement role in A Chorus Line on Broadway, and she performed on Broadway in Dancin' (1978).

Reed's additional television credits include roles in Promised Land, Beverly Hills, 90210, Touched by an Angel, Cheers, Magnum, P.I., The Colbys, Simon & Simon, Hotel, I Had Three Wives, Knight Rider, T.J. Hooker, Fantasy Island, Texas, and Newhart.

== Personal life ==
Reed married film director Terrence O'Hara.

== Filmography ==
Television and film roles
Year	Title	Role	Notes
1980	Texas	Terry Decker	1980–1981 (TV series)
1982	Gavilan		Episode: "Best Friend Money Can Buy"
1983	Legs	Lisa	TV movie
1983	Casablanca		Episode: "Jenny"
1983	The Dukes of Hazzard	Anna Lisa	Episode: "Lulu's Gone Away"
1983	Newhart	Iris Beecham	Episode: "The Looks of Love"
1983	For Love and Honor	Phyllis Wiecek	1983–1984 (12 episodes)
1984	The Master	Kelly Patterson	Episode: "Out-of-Time Step"
1984	T.J. Hooker	Angie Quinn	Episode: "Hooker's Run"
1984	Fantasy Island	Laura Martin	Episode: "Mermaid and the Matchmaker/The Obsolete Man"
1984	Knight Rider	Barbara Bellingham	Episode: "Let It Be Me"
1984	Simon & Simon	Valerie Bartlett	Episode: "The Dark Side of the Street"
1984	Mike Hammer	Ana	Episode: "Warpath"
1985	Braker	Dede Drummond	TV movies
1985	Midas Valley	Lillian Hammond	TV movies
1985	Mirrors	Diane	TV movies
1985	Hotel	Joanna Korsak	Episode: "Anniversary"
1985	I Had Three Wives	Liz	5 episodes
1986	The Colbys	Adrienne Cassidy	1986–1987 (14 episodes)
1988	Magnum, P.I.	Sarah Amlin	Episode: "The Great Hawaiian Adventure Company"
1988	Throb	Sheri	Episode: "Men Without Lips"
1988	Houston Knights		Episode: "Cajun Spice"
1988	Heartbeat	Caroline Petrie	Episode: "Where's Solomon When You Need Him?"; Episode: "Cory's Loss"; Episode: "To Heal a Doctor"
1988	Desert Rats		TV movie
1988	1st & Ten		Episode: "The Bulls Own Up"
1988	Cheers	Suzanne Porter	Episode: "Swear to God"
1989	The Banker	Sharon	
1989	Major Dad	Polly Cooper McGillis	1989–1993 (96 episodes)
1990	The Love Boat: A Valentine Voyage	Nina Morgan	TV movies
1990	Coins in the Fountain	Bonnie	TV movies
1993	The Trouble with Larry	Sally Easden Burton Flatt	7 episodes
1993	Shadowhunter	Waitress	TV movies
1993	Moment of Truth: Stalking Back	Linda Anello	TV movies
1994	The Babymaker: The Dr. Cecil Jacobson Story	Sue Castellano	TV movies
1994	Don't Talk to Strangers	Jane	TV movies
1995	The Sister-in-Law	Madeleine Richards Warner	TV movies
1995	Remember Me	Elaine Archer	TV movies
1996	Stand Against Fear	Anne Wilson	TV movies
1996	Alien Avengers	Rhonda	TV movies
1996	Rattled	Krista Donohue	TV movies
1996	Touched by an Angel	Morgan Bell	Episode: "Statute of Limitations"
1998	Beverly Hills, 90210	Patricia Myers	Episode: "All That Glitters"
1998	The Night Caller	Dr. Lindsay Roland	
1999	Promised Land	Helen Saunders	Episode: "In the Money"
