= One Crazy Summer =

1986 romantic comedy film by Savage Steve Holland

- Theatrical release poster by Carl Ramsey
- Directed by: Savage Steve Holland
- Written by: Savage Steve Holland
- Produced by: Michael Jaffe
- Starring: John Cusack; Demi Moore; Bobcat Goldthwait; Curtis Armstrong
- Cinematography: Isidore Mankofsky
- Edited by: Alan Balsam
- Music by: Cory Lerios
- Production company: A&M Films
- Distributed by: Warner Bros. Pictures
- Release date: August 8, 1986
- Running time: 89 minutes
- Country: United States
- Language: English
- Budget: $9 million
- Box office: $13 million

One Crazy Summer is a 1986 American romantic comedy film, written and directed by Savage Steve Holland, starring John Cusack, Demi Moore, Bobcat Goldthwait, Curtis Armstrong, Tom Villard, and Joel Murray. The original film score was composed by Cory Lerios.

== Plot ==
Hoops McCann, a recent high school graduate, fails to get a basketball scholarship, which disappoints his mother. He hopes to be admitted to the Rhode Island School of Design and must write and illustrate a love story for his application. He joins his friends, siblings George and Squid Calamari, as well as Squid's mangy and frequently ridiculed pet dog, Boscoe, to spend the summer on the island of Nantucket, Massachusetts.

En route, they pick up a young rock singer named Cassandra Eldridge who is pursued by a menacing motorcycle gang. Once on the island, Hoops and George, along with twin brothers Egg and Clay Stork and outcast Ack Ack Raymond, must help Cassandra save her grandfather's house from the greedy Beckersted family (led by the callous Aguilla). Along the way, Hoops must find a way to write his unrealized cartoon love story.

Hoops runs afoul of Teddy Beckersted and his neglected girlfriend, Cookie. She secretly offers Hoops a date, and he is persuaded to go out with her even though he had promised to appear at Cassandra's first musical performance (which turns out to be sparsely attended) on the island. Hoops and Cookie go to a drive-in movie theater where Teddy's friend, Ty, sees them together and notifies Teddy.

Meanwhile, Egg gets stuck in a Godzilla costume and causes havoc at Beckersted's promotional party for Beckersted Estates (which would be located at the spot of Cassandra's grandfather's house). Hoops, George, Egg and Ack Ack run into Teddy and his friends. As Teddy threatens them, Cassandra appears and offers an impromptu basketball challenge between him and Hoops; Teddy dominates and Hoops fails. After spraying Teddy and his friends with Mace, Cassandra is upset that Hoops did not appear for her performance and lied that he was a good basketball player.

In an effort to make it up to her, Hoops and his friends promote her next performance, which turns out to be a big success, and Cassandra forgives him. However, Aguilla immediately forecloses on the house before it can be saved. Ack Ack proposes they take part in the local regatta, despite Hoops' fear of the water, and they find and renovate an old boat to use. During this refit, Teddy brings his Ferrari in to the garage Egg and Clay work; when Egg sees Clay was punched by Teddy, he gets enraged and takes a chainsaw to use on the Ferrari.

The regatta starts with the teams using paddles, then changing to sails and finally motors. Teddy's team recklessly injures a member of one team and Ack Ack jumps into the water to save him. Aguilla, having stowed away on Teddy's boat, sabotages Hoops' sail with his crossbow. To repair the mast, Hoops successfully shoots the new halyard into the mast and they continue onward. Before Aguilla could shoot the mast again, he is thrown overboard by Squid, who is operating a mechanical dolphin from a nearby movie set, as retaliation for when he kicked her beloved dog earlier. When the teams use the motors, Hoops and his team win after using Teddy's Ferrari engine as their motor.

Hoops and his friends celebrate their victory—they are awarded the prize, Squid's dog turns out okay (after giving birth to puppies), George hooks up with Cookie, and Ack Ack wins his stern father's approval for his heroics. Despite winning, Hoops offers the trophy to Teddy if he spares Cassandra's house, but Teddy immediately backs out on his promise. However, Old Man Beckersted (father of Aguilla and grandfather of Teddy) gives back the trophy and spares Cassandra's house, stating that he was not going to "put a dime" in the Beckersted Estates and that "friendship" is what they should invest in. He then drags Teddy away by his ear.

With the prize returned and the house spared, Hoops and Cassandra kiss, and she inspires a love story for his application. In the final scene, George's uncle Frank finally wins a $1 million prize from a radio contest (having been driven insane every summer trying to win), but his phone gets disconnected and his prize is given away to someone else; he snaps and promptly uses Ack Ack's rocket launcher to blow up the radio station.

== Cast ==
- John Cusack as Hoops McCann
- Demi Moore as Cassandra Eldridge
- Curtis Armstrong as Ack Ack "Acky" Raymond
- Joel Murray as George Calamari
- Bobcat Goldthwait as Egg Stork
- Tom Villard as Clay Stork
- Joe Flaherty as General Raymond
- Kimberly Foster as Cookie Campbell
- Mark Metcalf as Aguilla Beckersted
- Matt Mulhern as Teddy Beckersted
- William Hickey as Old Man Beckersted
- Kristen Goelz as Squid Calamari
- Billie Bird as Grandma Calamari
- Bruce Wagner as Uncle Frank Calamari
- Sky as Boscoe
- Jeremy Piven as Ty
- Rich Little as Disc Jockey
- Rich Hall as Wilbur, gas station attendant
- Taylor Negron as Taylor, gas station attendant
- John Matuszak as Stain
- Donald Li as Chong Freen
- Laura Waterbury as Crossing Guard
- Linda Warren as Mrs. McCann
- Jerry Winsett as Big Man On Beach

== Production ==
Several locations on Cape Cod, Massachusetts were used for the film: Saint Pope John Paul II High School (as Generic High School), Hyannis West Elementary School (as Generic Elementary), the Woods Hole, Martha's Vineyard And Nantucket Steamship Authority ferry dock in Woods Hole, where the characters board the ferry, and the motorcycle gang leader jumps his motorcycle into the water. The gas station bathroom scene was shot on a stage built in the MBL Club in Woods Hole. The inside of General Raymond's Army-Navy store is Mass Bay Company, located at 595 Main Street, Hyannis, Massachusetts. The Stork brothers' gas station is the (then-Amoco) located at 1098 Main Street in Dennis, Massachusetts.

Hoops McCann is named after the protagonist in Steely Dan's song "Glamour Profession" from the Gaucho album, who is described as a professional basketball player in Los Angeles.

The animation in the film was directed by Bill Kopp who previously worked with Savage Steve Holland on Better Off Dead and would later work with him on Eek! The Cat. Two animators who worked on the film, David Silverman and Wes Archer, would later be directors on The Simpsons, and would animate Simpsons shorts on The Tracey Ullman Show with Kopp.

Savage Steve Holland was reportedly upset with Gene Siskel and Roger Ebert's criticism of his earlier film Better Off Dead, which led to the gag with the two bunnies that get blown up at the end of the movie who resemble the movie critics.

== Reception ==
Nina Darnton of The New York Times wrote, "In spite of the director's flair for zany humor, this film is just absurd." Pat Graham of the Chicago Reader found it "Not a bad film, and certainly more polished than Holland's Better Off Dead debut, though it's marred by unevenness and the director's ineradicable penchant for infantile clowning." The film maintains a 45% score at Rotten Tomatoes, based on 20 reviews.

== Proposed sequel ==
As of 2016, Holland was said to be in preparation with Bobcat Goldthwait on a semi-sequel called One Epic Fall:

"Of course, Joel [Murray] is gonna be in it. The question is, how do we make it a sequel when Cusack's not gonna be in it? But we have so many bad, dumb, great jokes we're piecing together to see if we can pull it off. I don't think Demi would be on board, but with Joel, Bobcat and Curtis, you've already got a trifecta of genius there."
