= Tom Villard =

American actor (1953–1994)

- Villard in 1987
- Born: Thomas Louis Villard; November 19, 1953; Waipahu, Territory of Hawaii
- Died: November 14, 1994 (aged 40); Los Angeles, California, U.S.
- Education: Allegheny College
- Occupation: Actor
- Years active: 1980–1994
- Partner: Scott Chambliss

Thomas Louis Villard (November 19, 1953 – November 14, 1994) was an American actor. He played one of the leading roles in the 1980s television sitcom We Got It Made, as well as roles in the feature films Grease 2, One Crazy Summer, Heartbreak Ridge, My Girl, and Popcorn.

== Early life ==
Villard was born in Waipahu, Territory of Hawaii, and grew up in Spencerport, New York, the son of Diane Ruth (MacNaughton), a teacher for students with emotional challenges, and Ronald Louis Villard, a photochemical engineer. He attended Allegheny College in Meadville, Pennsylvania, before moving to New York City to attend the Lee Strasberg Theatre and Film Institute and the American Musical and Dramatic Academy in the early 1970s. In 1980, Villard moved to Los Angeles and soon started landing roles on television and in movies. He also continued performing on stage until the end of his career.

== Career ==
Villard performed throughout his career on television, in feature films, and on stage around the country. He starred in situation comedies and episodic TV series, and had leading roles in lower- and mid-range budgeted features.

Villard appeared on television as minor characters in two different episodes of The Golden Girls, a panelist on Match Game/Hollywood Squares Hour, and a repeat celebrity guest on Body Language. During one episode of Body Language, Villard spoke of his collaborations with performance artist John Fleck.

At the peak of his career, Villard had supporting roles in big-budget studio fare, such as Clint Eastwood's Heartbreak Ridge, and My Girl (with Dan Aykroyd and Jamie Lee Curtis). Villard also had the title role in the 1987 independent film The Trouble With Dick, which won the Grand Jury Prize at the Sundance Film Festival. One of his final roles was playing a Bajoran monk on Star Trek: Deep Space Nine.

== Personal life and illness ==
Toward the end of his life, Villard became one of the few actors in Hollywood in the early 1990s who chose to be open about his homosexuality, and the challenge of living with HIV and AIDS. In February 1994, Villard made an appearance on the celebrity-profiling newsmagazine TV show Entertainment Tonight, acknowledging to "...more than 13 million viewers that he was gay, that he had AIDS, and that he needed some help."

According to a POZ magazine profile in December of that year Villard said, "An awful lot of people suddenly wouldn't let me in the door for auditions. I started speaking a couple of months ago about living with AIDS and having hope," he said. "It feels a little more useful than things (I've done) in the past." He went on to explain that since his appearance on Entertainment Tonight, a whole other group of people had come forward to welcome him. Bill Melamed, Villard's manager added: "I'm particularly proud of him. The reality is, acting is a lousy business... He made a decision that was courageous in any walk of life, but it doesn't surprise me. He has one of the most open spirits."

== Death ==
On November 14, 1994, five days shy of his 41st birthday, Villard died of AIDS-related pneumonia.

As a tribute to him, a non-profit foundation was created by his partner Scott Chambliss, close friend Caren Kaye, and his friend and chiropractor Cheryl Revkin. The Tom Villard Foundation was a Silver Lake community-based effort which engaged local businesses to provide free goods and services for community members living with AIDS. The beneficiaries were the client base of the former Silver Lake AIDS support organization, Being Alive. The Tom Villard Foundation no longer exists. Being Alive is now headquartered in West Hollywood.

== Filmography ==
Year	Title	Role	Notes
1980	CHiPs	Neil	Episode: "Sick Leave"
1981	Force: Five	Disciple	
1981	Sidney Shorr: A Girl's Best Friend	Eric	TV movie
1982	Parasite 3-D	Zeke	
1982	Grease 2	Boy Greaser (Willie)	
1983	Taxi	Cartoonist	Episode: "A Grand Gesture"
1983	High School U.S.A.	Crazy Leo Bandini	TV movie
1983–1984	We Got It Made	Jay Bostwick	46 episodes
1984	Surf II	Jocko O'Finley	
1985	MacGruder and Loud	Floyd	Episode: "The Inside Man"
1986	The A-Team	Barry Green	Episode: "Beneath the Surface"
1986	One Crazy Summer	Clay Stork	
1986	Weekend Warriors	Seblinsky	
1986	The Trouble with Dick	Dick Kendred	
1986	Heartbreak Ridge	Profile	
1986	The Golden Girls	Rick	Episode: "Vacation"
1989	Who's the Boss?	Andy Drake	Episode: "First Date"
1989	Swimsuit	Willard Thurm	TV movie
1990	Hunter	John Skouros	Episode: "Second Sight"
1991	Popcorn	Toby	
1991	Whore	Hippie	
1991	Shakes the Clown	Dirthead in the Car	
1991	My Girl	Justin	
1992	The Golden Girls	Randy Becker	Episode: "Rose: Portrait of a Woman"
1992	Baywatch	Howie	Episode: "Reunion"
1994	Star Trek: Deep Space Nine	Prylar Bek	Episode: "The Collaborator"
1994	In The Army Now	Obnoxious Salesguy	
1995	Op Center	Press Aide	TV movie (final film role)
