= Marc Kaminsky =

American poet, writer, psychotherapist, and gerontologist

Marc Kaminsky is an American poet, writer, psychotherapist, and gerontologist. His work ranges from editing a study of life review called The Uses of Reminiscence to writing poetry like A Table With People.

Kaminsky organized and conducted one of the earliest writing and reminiscing groups for elders, and edited the work of Barbara Myerhoff in Stories As Equipment for Living. He also explored the culture of Yiddishkeit. His long poem, The Road from Hiroshima, was produced as a play for voices for National Public Radio and was the inspiration for other works including a musical requiem. His most recent book is Shadow Traffic, a collection of essays, poems and short stories that deals with the aftermath of the Holocaust as well as the aftermath of personal traumas.

== Biography ==
Born to a Jewish family in New York City in 1943, Kaminsky studied at Columbia University, graduating with a B.A. in 1964, and then an M.A. in 1967. He was the director for the West Side Senior Center at the Jewish Association for Services for the Aged (JASA) from 1972 to 1977.

== Published works ==
- Birthday Poems (Horizon Press, 1972)
- What's Inside You It Shines Out of You (Horizon Press, 1974)
- A New House (Horizon Press, 1974)
- The Journal Project: Pages from the Lives of Old People (Teachers & Writers Collaborative, 1980)
- A Table With People (Sun, 1982)
- Daily Bread (University of Illinois Press, 1982)
- The Road from Hiroshima (Simon & Schuster, 1984)
- The Uses of Reminiscence (Routledge/Taylor & Francis Group, 1984)
- Target Populations (Central Park Editions, 1991)
- Shadow Traffic (Red Hen Press, 2007)
- A Cleft in the Rock (Dos Madres, 2018)
- The Stones of Lifta (Dos Madres, 2019)
