= Testament (1983 film) =

1983 film by Lynne Littman

- Theatrical release poster
- Directed by: Lynne Littman
- Screenplay by: John Sacret Young
- Based on: "The Last Testament" by Carol Amen
- Produced by: Jonathan Bernstein; Lynne Littman
- Starring: Jane Alexander; William Devane
- Cinematography: Steven Poster
- Edited by: Suzanne Pettit
- Music by: James Horner
- Production companies: Entertainment Events; American Playhouse
- Distributed by: Paramount Pictures
- Release date: November 4, 1983
- Running time: 90 minutes
- Country: United States
- Language: English
- Budget: $750,000
- Box office: $2 million

Testament is a 1983 American post-apocalyptic drama film co-produced and directed by Lynne Littman, written by John Sacret Young, and starring Jane Alexander, William Devane, Leon Ames, Ross Harris, Lukas Haas, Roxana Zal, Kevin Costner, and Rebecca De Mornay. Based on Carol Amen's 1981 short story "The Last Testament", the film focuses on the disintegration of a small suburban community in the greater San Francisco Bay Area after nuclear war destroys outside civilization.

Originally produced for the PBS series American Playhouse, it was given a theatrical release instead by Paramount Pictures on November 4, 1983 (although PBS did subsequently air it a year later). Alexander was nominated for the Academy Award for Best Actress for her performance.

== Plot ==
The Wetherly family—husband Tom, wife Carol, and children Brad, Mary Liz, and Scottie—live in the fictional suburb of Hamelin, California, north of Santa Rosa. Tom, the breadwinner, works in San Francisco, 60 miles south.

On a routine afternoon, Carol listens to an answering machine message from Tom saying he is on his way home for dinner. Scottie watches Sesame Street on TV when the show is suddenly replaced by white noise; after a few seconds, a San Francisco news anchor appears onscreen, saying they have lost their New York signal and there are radar indications of explosions of "nuclear devices up and down the East Coast." The anchorman is cut off by the Emergency Broadcast System tone. An announcer's voice states that the White House is interrupting the program, but the blinding flash of a nuclear detonation is seen through the window and the broadcast goes dead. The family huddles on the floor in panic as the town's air-raid sirens go off; minutes later, several of their neighbors are seen running around on the street outside, dazed in fear and confusion. The family tries to remain calm, hoping Tom is safe.

Hamelin seems to survive relatively unscathed. Frightened residents meet at the home of Henry Abhart, an elderly ham radio operator. He has made contact with survivors in rural areas, such as Keokuk, Iowa and Yosemite National Park (affected by a nearby nuclear blast), but reveals that the entire Bay Area and all major U.S. cities are radio-silent. Larry, a local boy who lost his parents, moves in with the Wetherleys but succumbs to radiation poisoning. The school play about the Pied Piper of Hamelin was in rehearsal before the bombings; desperate to recapture some normality, the town decides to go on with the show. The parents smile and applaud, many of them in tears. The day after the attack, the children noticed contaminated fallout dirt settling on solid surfaces as a result of the blast. Residents now have to cope with losing municipal services, food and gas shortages, and the loss of loved ones to radiation poisoning. Scottie, the first to succumb, is buried in the backyard because cemeteries are overwhelmed; Carol frantically searches for his teddy bear as the local priest prepares for his interment. As the dead accumulate faster than the manpower to bury them, wooden caskets are used as fuel for funeral pyres later, and Carol sews together a burial shroud from bedsheets for Mary Liz, who also dies from radiation exposure.

While the young die, older residents fall to rapid dementia, and order in the town starts to break down as police and firefighter ranks dwindle. With no one to renovate homes and no purpose to do so, properties, roads, and the physical appearances of survivors steadily deteriorate as radiation poisoning and social disintegration take their toll. A young couple leaves town after losing their infant, hoping to find safety and solace elsewhere. Carol's search for a battery causes her to listen once more to her husband's final message on the answering machine. To her sorrow, she finds a later (and previously unheard) message on the machine from Tom: he decided to stay at work late in San Francisco on the day of the attack, and she gives up hope that he will return home. Brad, Carol's last surviving child, helps his mother and takes over the radio for Henry Abhart. They adopt a mentally-disabled boy named Hiroshi who Tom used to take fishing along with his children after Hiroshi's father, Mike, died. Soon thereafter Carol starts showing signs of radiation poisoning. Carol decides she, Brad, and Hiroshi should avoid a slow and painful death from radiation poisoning and instead take their own lives via carbon monoxide poisoning. They gather in the family's station wagon with the engine running and the garage door closed, but Carol cannot bring herself to go through with the deed. They are finally seen sitting by candlelight to celebrate Brad's birthday, using a graham cracker in place of a cake. When asked what they should wish for, Carol answers: "That we remember it all...the good and the awful." She blows out the candle. An old family home movie of a surprise birthday party for Tom plays, showing him as he blows out the candles on his cake.

== Cast ==
- Jane Alexander as Carol Wetherly
- William Devane as Tom Wetherly
- Ross Harris as Brad Wetherly
- Roxana Zal as Mary Liz Wetherly
- Lukas Haas as Scottie Wetherly
- Philip Anglim as Hollis
- Lilia Skala as Fania
- Leon Ames as Henry Abhart
- Lurene Tuttle as Rosemary Abhart
- Rebecca De Mornay as Cathy Pitkin
- Kevin Costner as Phil Pitkin
- Mako as Mike
- Clete Roberts as Newscaster

== Background ==
Cover page for The Last Testament, the short story that inspired the film

In 1969, Testament was written as a short story by Carol Amen, an American writing teacher, free-lance writer, and member of First United Methodist Church of Sunnyvale, California, whose story originally ran in the September 1980 issue of the St. Anthony Messenger, a Roman Catholic magazine published by the Franciscan Friars of St. John the Baptist Province, Cincinnati, Ohio in the United States, with a circulation of roughly 350,000 in the 1980s, and later reprinted in the August 1981 issue of Ms. Magazine, where it was read by Lynne Littman.

Amen died from cancer in 1987."

== Production ==
Testament was shot entirely on location in the town of Sierra Madre, California, a suburb community of Los Angeles located in the San Gabriel Valley.

Since the film was originally made for public television, Jane Alexander got Screen Actors Guild scale wage (minimum pay under union contract) for her role, only $2,500.

== Release ==
Testament was theatrically released in the United States on November 4, 1983.

=== Home media ===
Testament was released by Paramount Home Video on Betamax, VHS, LaserDisc, and RCA's CED System in 1984.

The film was released on DVD in 2004 in an edition that contained three featurettes: Testament at 20, Testament: Nuclear Thoughts, and Timeline of the Nuclear Age; this edition has since gone out of print.

As part of its 2013 agreement with Paramount Pictures, Warner Home Video made the film available in 2014 for purchase on MOD (Manufactured on Demand) DVD Recordable disc via its Warner Archive Collection.

The Australian specialty home video reissue distributor Imprint Films released the film on Blu-ray disc in late 2022 in an edition limited to 1500 copies.

The film was released on Blu-ray by The Criterion Collection on March 17, 2026.

== Reception ==
=== Critical response ===
On Rotten Tomatoes, the film has an approval rating of 90% based on reviews from 48 critics. The site's consensus reads: "Testament shrugs off budget limitations to tell a powerful story that anchors nuclear paranoia in one family's harrowing ordeal." Metacritic, which uses a weighted average, assigned the film a score of 71 out of 100, based on 19 critics, indicating "generally favorable" reviews.

Roger Ebert of the Chicago Sun-Times gave the film four stars out of four, and was highly enthusiastic about the film. Ebert wrote that the film was powerful and made him cry, even after the second time he watched it. Ebert wrote: "The film is about a suburban American family, and what happens to that family after a nuclear war. It is not a science-fiction movie, and it doesn't have any special effects, and there are no big scenes of buildings blowing over or people disintegrating. We never even see a mushroom cloud. We never even know who started the war. Instead, Testament is a tragedy about manners: It asks how we might act toward one another, how our values might stand up, in the face of an overwhelming catastrophe."

Christopher John reviewed Testament in Ares Magazine Special Edition #2 and commented that "Testament may not change any lives, but it is bound to change the way some people think. Considering the subject matter, every little bit will help."

According to Carol Amen's close friend Patt Tubs in a 2020 interview, the author "was happy [the story] was going to be a movie. They showed the movie at church a few times, and I don’t remember her being super excited about it. It certainly wasn’t what she expected.”

=== Accolades ===
Award	Year	Category	Nominee(s)	Result	Ref.
Academy Awards	1984	Best Actress	Jane Alexander	Nominated	
Avoriaz International Fantastic Film Festival	1984	Grand Prix	Lynne Littman	Nominated	
Christopher Awards	1984	Feature Film		Won	
Golden Globe Awards	1984	Best Actress in a Motion Picture – Drama	Jane Alexander	Nominated	
Los Angeles Film Critics Association	1983	Best Actress	Jane Alexander	Runner-up	
National Board of Review	1983	Top Ten Films		6th Place	
Young Artist Awards	1984	Best Young Actor in a Motion Picture – Musical, Comedy, Adventure or Drama	Ross Harris	Nominated	
Young Artist Awards	1984	Best Young Actress in a Motion Picture – Musical, Comedy, Adventure or Drama	Roxana Zal	Nominated	

=== Retrospective ===
Testament has had positive retrospective reviews. Screen Rant has listed the film as one of the best science fiction movies directed by a woman, noting that it "went on to inspire other speculative war disaster media such as the TV show Jericho." Jacqueline Foertsch wrote that, in contrast to "a sizable majority of postapocalyptic and science fiction texts authored by Western male authors," Testament does not "ignore the reality of nuclear catastrophe" and "emphasize[s] threats to the well-being of families." Tor.com, in a piece on dystopian science fiction, called Testament "a realistic vision of the world we might live in after the bombs drop" and "quiet, brilliant little movie." Film critic Alexandra Heller-Nicholas wrote that Testament "utilises sci-fi to communicate a political message and remains a fascinating vision of life after a nuclear war" and "it remains a powerful but often widely forgotten sci-fi treasure." The Encyclopedia of Science Fiction calls it "potent and sentimental" and notes that it "seems not interested in causes, only in effects – in marked contrast to The Day After, made the same year."

The Science Fiction Handbook contrasts the film and others from the decade against 1950s/1960s dystopian films such as On the Beach, World Without End and Panic in the Year Zero by stating:

Other post-holocaust films of the long 1950s were even more indirect in their representation of nuclear war and its aftermath: graphic on-screen depictions of the actual effects of nuclear war were rare until the mid-1980s, when a spate of such films appeared, including The Day After (1983), Testament (1983), and Threads (1984)."

== See also ==
- The Day After, a 1983 television film about nuclear war that aired 2 weeks after Testament was released.
- Threads, a 1984 British television film that centers on nuclear war and the societal after-effects.
- On the Beach, a 1959 film about the last survivors of a nuclear war.
- List of apocalyptic and post-apocalyptic fiction
- List of nuclear holocaust fiction
