= List of awards and nominations received by M*A*S*H (TV series) =

The following is a list of awards and nominations received by the television series M*A*S*H.

== Golden Globe Awards ==
Year	Category	Nominee(s)	Result
1973 (30th)	Best TV Actor - Comedy or Musical	Alan Alda as Hawkeye Pierce	Nominated
1973 (30th)	Best TV Show - Comedy or Musical	—N/a	Nominated
1974 (31st)	Best Supporting Actor - Television	McLean Stevenson as Henry Blake	Won
1974 (31st)	Best Supporting Actress - Television	Loretta Swit as Margaret Houlihan	Nominated
1974 (31st)	Best TV Actor - Comedy or Musical	Alan Alda as Hawkeye Pierce	Nominated
1975 (32nd)	Best TV Actor - Comedy or Musical	Alan Alda as Hawkeye Pierce	Won
1976 (33rd)	Best Actor in a Television Series - Comedy or Musical	Alan Alda as Hawkeye Pierce	Won
1977 (34th)	Best Actor in a Television Series - Comedy or Musical	Alan Alda as Hawkeye Pierce	Nominated
1977 (34th)	Best Television Series - Comedy or Musical	—N/a	Nominated
1978 (35th)	Best Actor in a Television Series - Comedy or Musical	Alan Alda as Hawkeye Pierce	Nominated
1979 (36th)	Best Actor in a Television Series - Comedy or Musical	Alan Alda as Hawkeye Pierce	Nominated
1980 (37th)	Best Actor in a Television Series - Comedy or Musical	Alan Alda as Hawkeye Pierce	Won
1980 (37th)	Best Actress in a Television Series - Comedy or Musical	Loretta Swit as Margaret Houlihan	Nominated
1980 (37th)	Best Television Series - Comedy or Musical	—N/a	Nominated
1981 (38th)	Best Performance by an Actor in a Television Series - Comedy or Musical	Alan Alda as Hawkeye Pierce	Won
1981 (38th)	Best Television Series - Comedy or Musical	—N/a	Nominated
1982 (39th)	Best Performance by an Actor in a Television Series - Comedy or Musical	Alan Alda as Hawkeye Pierce	Won
1982 (39th)	Best Performance by an Actress in a Television Series - Comedy or Musical	Loretta Swit as Margaret Houlihan	Nominated
1982 (39th)	Best Television Series - Comedy or Musical	—N/a	Won
1983 (40th)	Best Performance by an Actor in a Television Series - Comedy or Musical	Alan Alda as Hawkeye Pierce	Won
1983 (40th)	Best Performance by an Actress in a Supporting Role in a Series, Miniseries or Motion Picture Made for Television	Loretta Swit as Margaret Houlihan	Nominated
1983 (40th)	Best Television Series - Comedy or Musical	—N/a	Nominated

== Primetime Emmy Awards ==
Year	Category	Nominee(s)	Result
1973 (25th)	Outstanding Comedy Series	Gene Reynolds (producer)	Nominated
1973 (25th)	Outstanding Continued Performance by an Actor in a Leading Role in a Comedy Series	Alan Alda as Hawkeye Pierce	Nominated
1973 (25th)	Outstanding Performance by an Actor in a Supporting Role in Comedy	Gary Burghoff as Radar O'Reilly	Nominated
1973 (25th)	Outstanding Performance by an Actor in a Supporting Role in Comedy	McLean Stevenson as Henry Blake	Nominated
1973 (25th)	Outstanding Directorial Achievement in Comedy	Gene Reynolds for the pilot episode	Nominated
1973 (25th)	Outstanding Writing Achievement in Comedy	Larry Gelbart for the pilot episode	Nominated
1973 (25th)	Outstanding New Series	Gene Reynolds (producer)	Nominated
1973 (25th)	Outstanding Achievement in Film Editing for Entertainment Programming - For a Series or a Single Program of a Series	Stanford Tischler and Fred Berger	Nominated
1974 (26th)	Outstanding Comedy Series	Larry Gelbart and Gene Reynolds (producers)	Won
1974 (26th)	Best Lead Actor in a Comedy Series	Alan Alda as Hawkeye Pierce	Won
1974 (26th)	Best Supporting Actor in Comedy	Gary Burghoff as Radar O'Reilly	Nominated
1974 (26th)	Best Supporting Actor in Comedy	McLean Stevenson as Henry Blake	Nominated
1974 (26th)	Best Supporting Actress in Comedy	Loretta Swit as Margaret Houlihan	Nominated
1974 (26th)	Best Directing in Comedy	Jackie Cooper for "Carry On, Hawkeye"	Won
1974 (26th)	Best Directing in Comedy	Gene Reynolds for "Deal Me Out"	Nominated
1974 (26th)	Best Writing in Comedy	Linda Bloodworth-Thomason and Mary Kay Place for "Hot Lips and Empty Arms"	Nominated
1974 (26th)	Best Writing in Comedy	McLean Stevenson for "The Trial of Henry Blake"	Nominated
1974 (26th)	Actor of the Year - Series	Alan Alda	Won
1974 (26th)	Best Film Editing for Entertainment Programming - For a Series or a Single Program of a Series	Stanford Tischler and Fred Berger	Nominated
1975 (27th)	Outstanding Comedy Series	Larry Gelbart and Gene Reynolds (producers)	Nominated
1975 (27th)	Outstanding Lead Actor in a Comedy Series	Alan Alda as Hawkeye Piece	Nominated
1975 (27th)	Outstanding Continuing Performance by a Supporting Actor in a Comedy Series	Gary Burghoff as Radar O'Reilly	Nominated
1975 (27th)	Outstanding Continuing Performance by a Supporting Actor in a Comedy Series	McLean Stevenson as Henry Blake	Nominated
1975 (27th)	Outstanding Continuing Performance by a Supporting Actress in a Comedy Series	Loretta Swit as Margaret Houlihan	Nominated
1975 (27th)	Outstanding Directing in a Comedy Series	Alan Alda for "Bulletin Board"	Nominated
1975 (27th)	Outstanding Directing in a Comedy Series	Hy Averback for "Alcoholics Unanimous"	Nominated
1975 (27th)	Outstanding Directing in a Comedy Series	Gene Reynolds for "O.R."	Won
1975 (27th)	Outstanding Single Performance by a Supporting Actor in a Comedy or Drama Series	Harry Morgan as General Steele in "The General Flipped at Dawn"	Nominated
1975 (27th)	Outstanding Achievement in Cinematography for Entertainment Programming for a Series	William Jurgensen for "Bombed"	Nominated
1975 (27th)	Outstanding Film Editing for Entertainment Programming for a Series - For a Single Episode of a Comedy Series	Stanford Tischler and Fred Berger for "The General Flipped at Dawn"	Nominated
1976 (28th)	Outstanding Comedy Series	Larry Gelbart and Gene Reynolds (producers)	Nominated
1976 (28th)	Outstanding Lead Actor in a Comedy Series	Alan Alda as Hawkeye Pierce	Nominated
1976 (28th)	Outstanding Continuing Performance by a Supporting Actor in a Comedy Series	Gary Burghoff as Radar O'Reilly	Nominated
1976 (28th)	Outstanding Continuing Performance by a Supporting Actor in a Comedy Series	Harry Morgan as Colonel Potter	Nominated
1976 (28th)	Outstanding Continuing Performance by a Supporting Actress in a Comedy Series	Loretta Swit as Margaret Houlihan	Nominated
1976 (28th)	Outstanding Directing in a Comedy Series	Alan Alda for "The Kids"	Nominated
1976 (28th)	Outstanding Directing in a Comedy Series	Gene Reynolds for "Welcome to Korea"	Won
1976 (28th)	Outstanding Writing in a Comedy Series	Larry Gelbart and Gene Reynolds for "The More I See You"	Nominated
1976 (28th)	Outstanding Writing in a Comedy Series	Larry Gelbart and Simon Muntner for "Hawkeye"	Nominated
1976 (28th)	Outstanding Achievement in Cinematography for Entertainment Programming for a Series	William Jurgensen for "Hawkeye"	Nominated
1976 (28th)	Outstanding Achievement in Film Editing for Entertainment Programming for a Series - For a Single Episode of a Comedy Series	Stanford Tischler and Fred Berger for "Welcome to Korea"	Won
1977 (29th)	Outstanding Comedy Series	Gene Reynolds (executive producer); Allan Katz, Don Reo and Burt Metcalfe (producers)	Nominated
1977 (29th)	Outstanding Lead Actor in a Comedy Series	Alan Alda as Hawkeye Piece	Nominated
1977 (29th)	Outstanding Continuing Performance by a Supporting Actor in a Comedy Series	Gary Burghoff as Radar O'Reilly	Won
1977 (29th)	Outstanding Continuing Performance by a Supporting Actor in a Comedy Series	Harry Morgan as Colonel Potter	Nominated
1977 (29th)	Outstanding Continuing Performance by a Supporting Actress in a Comedy Series	Loretta Swit as Margaret Houlihan	Nominated
1977 (29th)	Outstanding Directing in a Comedy Series	Alan Alda for "Dear Sigmund"	Won
1977 (29th)	Outstanding Directing in a Comedy Series	Joan Darling for "The Nurses"	Nominated
1977 (29th)	Outstanding Directing in a Comedy Series	Alan Rafkin for "Lt. Radar O'Reilly"	Nominated
1977 (29th)	Outstanding Writing in a Comedy Series	Alan Alda for "Dear Sigmund"	Nominated
1977 (29th)	Outstanding Cinematography in Entertainment Programming for a Series	William Jurgensen for "Dear Sigmund"	Nominated
1977 (29th)	Outstanding Film Editing in a Comedy Series	Stanford Tischler and Samuel Beetley for "Dear Sigmund"	Nominated
1978 (30th)	Outstanding Comedy Series	Burt Metcalfe (producer)	Nominated
1978 (30th)	Outstanding Lead Actor in a Comedy Series	Alan Alda as Hawkeye Pierce	Nominated
1978 (30th)	Outstanding Continuing Performance by a Supporting Actor in a Comedy Series	Gary Burghoff as Radar O'Reilly	Nominated
1978 (30th)	Outstanding Continuing Performance by a Supporting Actor in a Comedy Series	Harry Morgan as Colonel Potter	Nominated
1978 (30th)	Outstanding Continuing Performance by a Supporting Actress in a Comedy Series	Loretta Swit as Margaret Houlihan	Nominated
1978 (30th)	Outstanding Directing in a Comedy Series	Burt Metcalfe and Alan Alda for "Comrades in Arms, Part I"	Nominated
1978 (30th)	Outstanding Writing in a Comedy Series	Alan Alda for "Fallen Idol"	Nominated
1978 (30th)	Outstanding Film Editing in a Comedy Series	Stanford Tischler and Larry Mills for "Fade Out, Fade In"	Nominated
1979 (31st)	Outstanding Comedy Series	Burt Metcalfe (producer)	Nominated
1979 (31st)	Outstanding Lead Actor in a Comedy Series	Alan Alda as Hawkeye Pierce	Nominated
1979 (31st)	Outstanding Supporting Actor in a Comedy or Comedy-Variety or Music Series	Gary Burghoff as Radar O'Reilly	Nominated
1979 (31st)	Outstanding Supporting Actor in a Comedy or Comedy-Variety or Music Series	Harry Morgan as Colonel Potter	Nominated
1979 (31st)	Outstanding Supporting Actress in a Comedy or Comedy-Variety or Music Series	Loretta Swit as Margaret Houlihan	Nominated
1979 (31st)	Outstanding Directing in a Comedy or Comedy-Variety or Music Series	Alan Alda for "Dear Sis"	Nominated
1979 (31st)	Outstanding Directing in a Comedy or Comedy-Variety or Music Series	Charles S. Dubin for "Point of View"	Nominated
1979 (31st)	Outstanding Writing in a Comedy or Comedy-Variety or Music Series	Alan Alda for "Inga"	Won
1979 (31st)	Outstanding Writing in a Comedy or Comedy-Variety or Music Series	Ken Levine and David Isaacs for "Point of View"	Nominated
1979 (31st)	Outstanding Film Editing for a Series	Stanford Tischler and Larry Mills for "The Billfold Syndrome"	Nominated
1980 (32nd)	Outstanding Comedy Series	Burt Metcalfe (executive producer); John Rappaport and Jim Mulligan (producers)	Nominated
1980 (32nd)	Outstanding Lead Actor in a Comedy Series	Alan Alda as Hawkeye Pierce	Nominated
1980 (32nd)	Outstanding Supporting Actor in a Comedy or Variety or Music Series	Mike Farrell as BJ Hunnicutt	Nominated
1980 (32nd)	Outstanding Supporting Actor in a Comedy or Variety or Music Series	Harry Morgan as Colonel Potter	Won
1980 (32nd)	Outstanding Supporting Actress in a Comedy or Variety or Music Series	Loretta Swit as Margaret Houlihan	Won
1980 (32nd)	Outstanding Directing in a Comedy Series	Alan Alda for "Dreams"	Nominated
1980 (32nd)	Outstanding Directing in a Comedy Series	Charles S. Dubin for "Period of Adjustment"	Nominated
1980 (32nd)	Outstanding Directing in a Comedy Series	Burt Metcalfe for "Bottle Fatigue"	Nominated
1980 (32nd)	Outstanding Directing in a Comedy Series	Harry Morgan for "Stars and Stripes"	Nominated
1980 (32nd)	Outstanding Writing in a Comedy Series	Ken Levine and David Isaacs for "Goodbye, Radar - Part II"	Nominated
1980 (32nd)	Outstanding Achievement in Film Editing for a Series	Stanford Tischler and Larry Mills for "The Yalu Brick Road"	Nominated
1981 (33rd)	Outstanding Comedy Series	Burt Metcalfe (executive producer); John Rappaport (producer)	Nominated
1981 (33rd)	Outstanding Lead Actor in a Comedy Series	Alan Alda as Hawkeye Pierce	Nominated
1981 (33rd)	Outstanding Supporting Actor in a Comedy or Variety or Music Series	Harry Morgan as Colonel Potter	Nominated
1981 (33rd)	Outstanding Supporting Actor in a Comedy or Variety or Music Series	David Ogden Stiers as Charles Emerson Winchester	Nominated
1981 (33rd)	Outstanding Supporting Actress in a Comedy or Variety or Music Series	Loretta Swit as Margaret Houlihan	Nominated
1981 (33rd)	Outstanding Directing in a Comedy Series	Alan Alda for "The Life You Save"	Nominated
1981 (33rd)	Outstanding Directing in a Comedy Series	Burt Metcalfe for "No Laughing Matter"	Nominated
1981 (33rd)	Outstanding Writing in a Comedy Series	Mike Farrell, John Rappaport and Dennis Koenig (teleplay); Thad Mumford, Dan Wilcox and Burt Metcalfe (story) for "Death Takes a Holiday"	Nominated
1981 (33rd)	Outstanding Achievement in Film Editing for a Series	Stanford Tischler and Larry Mills for "Death Takes a Holiday"	Nominated
1982 (34th)	Outstanding Comedy Series	Burt Metcalfe (executive producer); John Rappaport (supervising producer); Thad Mumford, Dan Wilcox and Dennis Koenig (producers)	Nominated
1982 (34th)	Outstanding Lead Actor in a Comedy Series	Alan Alda as Hawkeye Pierce	Won
1982 (34th)	Outstanding Supporting Actor in a Comedy or Variety or Music Series	Harry Morgan as Colonel Potter	Nominated
1982 (34th)	Outstanding Supporting Actor in a Comedy or Variety or Music Series	David Ogden Stiers as Charles Emerson Winchester	Nominated
1982 (34th)	Outstanding Supporting Actress in a Comedy or Variety or Music Series	Loretta Swit as Margaret Houlihan	Won
1982 (34th)	Outstanding Directing in a Comedy Series	Alan Alda for "Where There's a Will, There's a War"	Nominated
1982 (34th)	Outstanding Directing in a Comedy Series	Hy Averback for "Sons and Bowlers"	Nominated
1982 (34th)	Outstanding Directing in a Comedy Series	Charles S. Dubin for "Pressure Points"	Nominated
1982 (34th)	Outstanding Directing in a Comedy Series	Burt Metcalfe for "Picture This"	Nominated
1982 (34th)	Outstanding Writing in a Comedy Series	Alan Alda for "Follies of the Living - Concerns of the Dead"	Nominated
1983 (35th)	Outstanding Comedy Series	Burt Metcalfe (executive producer); John Rappaport (supervising producer); Dan Wilcox and Thad Mumford (producers)	Nominated
1983 (35th)	Outstanding Lead Actor in a Comedy Series	Alan Alda as Hawkeye Pierce	Nominated
1983 (35th)	Outstanding Supporting Actor in a Comedy, Variety or Music Series	Harry Morgan as Colonel Potter	Nominated
1983 (35th)	Outstanding Supporting Actress in a Comedy, Variety or Music Series	Loretta Swit as Margaret Houlihan	Nominated
1983 (35th)	Outstanding Directing in a Comedy Series	Alan Alda for "Goodbye, Farewell and Amen"	Nominated
1983 (35th)	Outstanding Directing in a Comedy Series	Burt Metcalfe for "The Joker is Wild"	Nominated
1983 (35th)	Outstanding Film Editing for a Series	Stanford Tischler and Larry Mills for "Goodbye, Farewell and Amen"	Nominated
1983 (35th)	Outstanding Individual Achievement - Costumers	Albert Hankel (men's costumer); Rita Bennett (women's costumer) for "Goodbye, Farewell and Amen"	Nominated
1983 (35th)	Outstanding Sound Editing for a Series	Edward Rossi (supervising sound editor); William Hartman, David M. Ice, Godfrey Marks, Richard Sperber and Don Isaacs (sound editors) for "Goodbye, Farewell and Amen"	Nominated

== Writers Guild of America Awards ==
Year	Category	Episode	Nominee(s)	Result
1973	Episodic Comedy	"Chief Surgeon Who?"	Larry Gelbart	Won
1974	Episodic Comedy	"Carry On, Hawkeye"	Larry Gelbart, Laurence Marks and Bernard Dilbert	Nominated
1974	Episodic Comedy	"The Incubator"	Larry Gelbart and Laurence Marks	Nominated
1974	Episodic Comedy	"Radar's Report"	Laurence Marks and Sheldon Keller	Nominated
1974	Episodic Comedy	"Sometimes You Hear the Bullet"	Carl Kleinschmitt	Nominated
1974	Episodic Comedy	"Tuttle"	Bruce Shelly and David Ketchum	Nominated
1975	Episodic Comedy	"O.R."	Larry Gelbart and Laurence Marks	Won
1975	Episodic Comedy	"Private Charles Lamb"	Sid Dorfman	Nominated
1976	Episodic Comedy	"Big Mac"	Laurence Marks	Nominated
1976	Episodic Comedy	"Welcome to Korea"	Everett Greenbaum, Jim Fritzell and Larry Gelbart	Won
1977	Episodic Comedy	"Dear Sigmund"	Alan Alda	Won
1977	Episodic Comedy	"Hawkeye Get Your Gun"	Jay Folb and Gene Reynolds	Nominated
1978	Episodic Comedy	"Fade Out, Fade In"	Everett Greenbaum and Jim Fritzell	Nominated
1979	Episodic Comedy	"Baby, It's Cold Outside"	Gary David Goldberg	Won
1979	Episodic Comedy	"Point of View"	Ken Levine and David Isaacs	Nominated
1980	Episodic Comedy	"Are You Now, Margaret?"	Thad Mumford and Dan Wilcox	Won (Note: Tied with theTaxi episode "The Reluctant Fighter")
1980	Episodic Comedy	"Good-bye, Radar"	Ken Levine and David Isaacs	Nominated
1980	Episodic Comedy	"Period of Adjustment"	Jim Mulligan and John Rappaport	Nominated
1980	Episodic Comedy	"The Young and the Restless"	Mitch Markowitz	Nominated
1981	Episodic Comedy	"Bottle Fatigue"	Thad Mumford and Dan Wilcox	Nominated
1981	Episodic Comedy	"Heal Thyself"	Dennis Koenig and Gene Reynolds	Won
1981	Episodic Comedy	"Morale Victory"	John Rappaport	Nominated
1981	Episodic Drama	"Dreams"	Alan Alda and James Jay Rubinfier	Nominated
1982	Episodic Comedy	"No Sweat"	John Rappaport	Nominated
1982	Episodic Comedy	"A War for All Seasons"	Dan Wilcox and Thad Mumford	Nominated
1982	Episodic Drama	"Bless You, Hawkeye"	Dan Wilcox and Thad Mumford	Nominated
1983	Episodic Comedy	"The Birthday Girls"	Karen Hall	Nominated
1984	Episodic Comedy	"Goodbye, Farewell and Amen"	Alan Alda, Burt Metcalfe, John Rappaport, Dan Wilcox, Thad Mumford, Elias Davis, David Pollock and Karen Allen	Nominated
