= Writers Guild of America Award for Television: Episodic Comedy =

Annual television award

- Awarded for: Outstanding Writing for a Comedy Series
- Country: United States
- Presented by: Writers Guild of America
- First award: 1960; 66 years ago
- Currently held by: John Carcieri, Jeff Fradley, Danny McBride; The Righteous Gemstones (2025)
- Website: http://www.wga.org/

The Writers Guild of America Award for Television: Episodic Comedy is an award presented by the Writers Guild of America to the best written comedy episodes of television series. It was first presented at the 13th annual Writers Guild of America awards in 1961 and has been presented annually since the 17th annual Writers Guild of America awards in 1965.

The years denote when the episode first aired. Though, due to the eligibility period, some nominees could have aired in a different year. The current eligibility period is December 1 to November 30. The winners are highlighted in gold.

== Winners and nominees ==
=== 1960s ===
Year	Series	Episode	Winners/nominees	Network
Episodic, Longer Than 30 Minutes in Length
1960 (13th)
1960 (13th)	Father Knows Best	"Margaret's Old Flame"	Dorothy Cooper	CBS
1960 (13th)	The Danny Thomas Show	"Linda Wants to Be a Boy"	Charles Stewart & Jack Elinson	CBS
1960 (13th)	My Three Sons	"Chip off the Old Block"	George Tibbles	ABC
Comedy/Variety, Any Length
1961 (14th)
1961 (14th)	The Andy Griffith Show	"The Manhunt"	Charles Stewart & Jack Elinson	CBS
1961 (14th)	The Art Carney Special	"Everybody's Doin' It"	Herbert Sargent	NBC
1961 (14th)	The Arthur Murray Special for Bob Hope		Lester A. White, John Rapp, Mort Lachman, Bill Larkin, Charles Lee and Norman Sullivan	NBC
1962 (15th)
1962 (15th)	Car 54, Where Are You?	"I Won't Go"	Nat Hiken and Gary Belkin	NBC
1962 (15th)	The Dick Van Dyke Show	"Where Did I Come From?"	Carl Reiner	CBS
1962 (15th)	My Three Sons	"Birds and Bees"	George Tibbles	ABC
1963 (16th)
1963 (16th)	The Andy Griffith Show	"Barney's First Car"	Jim Fritzell & Everett Greenbaum	CBS
1963 (16th)	The Andy Griffith Show	"Barney Mends a Broken Heart"	Aaron Ruben	CBS
1963 (16th)	The Bob Hope Christmas Show		Mort Lachman, Bill Larkin, John Rapp, Lester A. White, Charles Lee, Norman Sullivan and Gig Henry	NBC
1963 (16th)	The Dick Van Dyke Show	"It May Look Like a Walnut"	Carl Reiner	CBS
1963 (16th)	I'm Dickens, He's Fenster	"A Small Matter of Being Fired"	Leonard B. Stern and Don Hinkley	ABC
1963 (16th)	My Three Sons	"When I Was Your Age"	Ernest Chambers	ABC
Episodic Comedy
1964 (17th)
1964 (17th)	The Andy Griffith Show	"The Shoplifters"	Bill Idelson & Sam Bobrick	CBS
1964 (17th)	The Dick Van Dyke Show	"My Husband is the Best One"	Martin Ragaway	CBS
1964 (17th)	The Danny Thomas Show	"Bowling Partners"	Jerry Belson & Garry Marshall	CBS
1964 (17th)	The Dick Van Dyke Show	"October Eve"	Bill Persky & Sam Denoff	CBS
1964 (17th)	The Dick Van Dyke Show	"Turtles, Ties and Toreadors"	John Whedon	CBS
1965 (18th)
1965 (18th)	The Dick Van Dyke Show	"Br-room, Br-room"	Dale McRaven & Carl Kleinschmitt	CBS
1965 (18th)	The Beverly Hillbillies	"Dash Riprock, You Cad"	Paul Henning & Mark Tuttle	ABC
1965 (18th)	The Dick Van Dyke Show	"4½"	Garry Marshall & Jerry Belson	CBS
1965 (18th)	The Dick Van Dyke Show	"Romances, Roses and Rye Bread"	Garry Marshall & Jerry Belson	CBS
1965 (18th)	Dr. Kildare	"Maybe Love Will Save My Apartment House"	Boris Sobelman	NBC
1966 (19th)
1966 (19th)	The Dick Van Dyke Show	"You Ought to Be in Pictures"	Jack Winter	CBS
1966 (19th)	The Dick Van Dyke Show	"Go Tell the Birds and the Bees"	Rick Mittleman	CBS
1966 (19th)	Gidget	"The Great Kahuna"	Story by : Frederick Kohner; Teleplay by : Albert Mannheimer	ABC
1966 (19th)	Gomer Pyle, U.S.M.C.	"Opie Joins the Marines"	Aaron Ruben	CBS
1967 (20th)
1967 (20th)	The Jackie Gleason Show	"Movies Are Better than Ever"	Marvin Marx, Walter Stone and Rod Parker	CBS
1967 (20th)	Get Smart	"Bronzefinger"	Lila Garrett & Bernie Kahn	NBC
1967 (20th)	Get Smart	"Where-What-Who Am I?"	Barry Blitzer & Ray Brenner	NBC
1967 (20th)	That Girl	"Rain, Snow and Rice"	James L. Brooks	ABC
1968 (21st)
1968 (21st)	Get Smart	"Viva Smart"	Bill Idelson, Sam Bobrick and Norman Paul	NBC
1968 (21st)	He & She	"Before You Bury Me, Can I Say Something?"	Jim Parker & Arnold Margolin	CBS
1968 (21st)	He & She	"Knock, Knock...Who's There? Fernando!...Fernando Who?"	Allan Burns & Chris Hayward	CBS
1968 (21st)	He & She	"The Old Man and the She"	Leonard B. Stern & Arne Sultan	CBS
1969 (22nd)
1969 (22nd)	Room 222	"Funny Boy"	Allan Burns	ABC
1969 (22nd)	The Bill Cosby Show	"Growing, Growing, Grown"	Kenny Solms & Gail Parent	NBC
1969 (22nd)	Get Smart	"The Apes of Rath"	Lloyd Turner & Gordon Whitey Mitchell	CBS
1969 (22nd)	Get Smart	"Ice Station Siegfried"	Arne Sultan & Chris Hayward	CBS
1969 (22nd)	The Jackie Gleason Show	"Play it Again, Norton"	Walter Stone, Rod Parker & Robert Hilliard	CBS
1969 (22nd)	My World and Welcome to It	"Little Girls are Sugar & Spice, and Not Always Nice!"	Rick Mittleman	NBC

=== 1970s ===
Year	Series	Episode	Winners/nominees	Network
1970 (23rd)
1970 (23rd)	Room 222	"The Valedictorian"	Richard DeRoy	ABC
1970 (23rd)	The Governor & J.J.	"Check the Check"	Arne Sultan & Earl Barret	CBS
1970 (23rd)	My World and Welcome to It	"The Fourth Estate"	Lila Garrett & Bernie Kahn	NBC
1970 (23rd)	Room 222	"Funny Money"	Steve Pritzker	ABC
1971 (24th)
1971 (24th)	The Mary Tyler Moore Show	"Thoroughly Unmilitant Mary"	Martin Cohan	CBS
1971 (24th)	All in the Family	"Christmas at the Bunkers"	Don Nicholl	CBS
1971 (24th)	All in the Family	"Edith's Accident"	Story by : Tom & Helen August; Teleplay by : Michael Ross & Bernie West	CBS
1971 (24th)	All in the Family	"Gloria has a Belly Full"	Jerry Mayer	CBS
1971 (24th)	All in the Family	"Mike's Problem"	Story by : Alan J. Levitt & Phil Mishkin; Teleplay by : Alan J. Levitt	CBS
1971 (24th)	All in the Family	"Oh, My Aching Back"	Stanley Ralph Ross	CBS
1972 (25th)
1972 (25th)	M*A*S*H	"Chief Surgeon Who?"	Larry Gelbart	CBS
1972 (25th)	All in the Family	"Edith's Problem"	Story by : Burt Styler & Steve Zacharias; Teleplay by : Burt Styler	CBS
1972 (25th)	The Mary Tyler Moore Show	"The Good-Time News"	Allan Burns & James L. Brooks	CBS
1972 (25th)	Maude	"Flashback"	Alan J. Levitt	CBS
1972 (25th)	The Odd Couple	"The Pen is Mightier Than the Pencil"	Jack Winter	ABC
1973 (26th)
1973 (26th)	Maude	"Walter's Problem"	Bob Weiskopf & Bob Schiller	CBS
1973 (26th)	The Mary Tyler Moore Show	"The Lars Affair"	Ed. Weinberger	CBS
1973 (26th)	M*A*S*H	"Carry On, Hawkeye"	Story by : Bernard Dilbert; Teleplay by : Bernard Dilbert, Larry Gelbart and Laurence Marks	CBS
1973 (26th)	M*A*S*H	"The Incubator"	Larry Gelbart & Laurence Marks	CBS
1973 (26th)	M*A*S*H	"Radar's Report"	Story by : Sheldon Keller; Teleplay by : Laurence Marks	CBS
1973 (26th)	M*A*S*H	"Sometimes You Hear the Bullet"	Carl Kleinschmitt	CBS
1973 (26th)	M*A*S*H	"Tuttle"	Bruce Shelly & David Ketchum	CBS
1974 (27th)
1974 (27th)	M*A*S*H	"O.R."	Larry Gelbart & Laurence Marks	CBS
1974 (27th)	The Mary Tyler Moore Show	"Will Mary Richards Go to Jail?"	Ed. Weinberger & Stan Daniels	CBS
1974 (27th)	M*A*S*H	"Private Charles Lamb"	Sid Dorfman	CBS
1974 (27th)	Rhoda	"Parents' Day"	Charlotte Brown	CBS
1974 (27th)	Rhoda	"You Can Go Home Again"	Pat Nardo & Gloria Banta	CBS
1975 (28th)
1975 (28th)	M*A*S*H	"Welcome to Korea"	Everett Greenbaum, Jim Fritzell and Larry Gelbart	CBS
1975 (28th)	All in the Family	"Archie the Hero"	Lou Derman & Bill Davenport	CBS
1975 (28th)	The Mary Tyler Moore Show	"Chuckles Bites the Dust"	David Lloyd	CBS
1975 (28th)	The Mary Tyler Moore Show	"Edie Gets Married"	Bob Ellison	CBS
1975 (28th)	M*A*S*H	"Big Mac"	Laurence Marks	CBS
1975 (28th)	Rhoda	"Ida's Doctor"	Coleman Mitchell & Geoffrey Neigher	CBS
1976 (29th)
1976 (29th)	M*A*S*H	"Dear Sigmund"	Alan Alda	CBS
1976 (29th)	All in the Family	"Joey's Baptism"	Milt Josefsberg, Mel Tolkin and Larry Rhine	CBS
1976 (29th)	Barney Miller	"The Evacuation"	Story by : Chris Hayward & Danny Arnold; Teleplay by : Danny Arnold	ABC
1976 (29th)	The Mary Tyler Moore Show	"Mary's Insomnia"	David Lloyd	CBS
1976 (29th)	The Mary Tyler Moore Show	"My Son, the Genius"	Bob Ellison	CBS
1976 (29th)	M*A*S*H	"Hawkeye, Get Your Gun"	Story by : Gene Reynolds & Jay Folb; Teleplay by : Jay Folb	CBS
1977 (30th)
1977 (30th)	All in the Family	"Archie Get the Business"	Larry Rhine & Mel Tolkin	CBS
1977 (30th)	All in the Family	"The Joys of Sex"	Erik Tarloff	CBS
1977 (30th)	Barney Miller	"Copy Cat"	Douglas Wyman & Tony Sheehan	ABC
1977 (30th)	Barney Miller	"Goodbye, Mr. Fish", Part 2	Reinhold Weege	ABC
1977 (30th)	The Bob Newhart Show	"A Girl in Her Twenties"	Laura Levine	CBS
1977 (30th)	The Bob Newhart Show	"A Jackie Story"	Lloyd Garver	CBS
1977 (30th)	The Jeffersons	"Once a Friend"	Michael S. Baser & Kim Weiskopf	CBS
1977 (30th)	The Mary Tyler Moore Show	"The Critic"	David Lloyd	CBS
1977 (30th)	The Mary Tyler Moore Show	"The Last Show"	James L. Brooks, Allan Burns, Ed. Weinberger, Stan Daniels, David Lloyd and Bob Ellison	CBS
1977 (30th)	M*A*S*H	"Fade Out, Fade In"	Jim Fritzell & Everett Greenbaum	CBS
1978 (31st)
1978 (31st)	M*A*S*H	"Baby, It's Cold Outside"	Gary David Goldberg	CBS
1978 (31st)	All in the Family	"California, Here We Are"	Milt Josefsberg, Phil Sharp, Bob Schiller and Bob Weiskopf	CBS
1978 (31st)	Barney Miller	"The Ghost"	Reinhold Weege	ABC
1978 (31st)	M*A*S*H	"Point of View"	Ken Levine & David Isaacs	CBS
1978 (31st)	Mork & Mindy	"Pilot"	Dale McRaven	ABC
1978 (31st)	Rhoda	"Rhoda vs. Ida"	Bob Ellison	CBS
1978 (31st)	Taxi	"Blind Date"	Michael Leeson	ABC
1978 (31st)	Taxi	"Memories of Cab 804"	Barry Kemp	ABC
1979 (32nd)
1979 (32nd)	M*A*S*H	"Are You Now, Margaret?"	Thad Mumford & Dan Wilcox	CBS
1979 (32nd)	Taxi	"The Reluctant Father"	Ken Estin	ABC
1979 (32nd)	Barney Miller	"The Indian"	Story by : Richard William Beban, Judith Anne Nielsen and Reinhold Weege; Teleplay by : Reinhold Weege	ABC
1979 (32nd)	M*A*S*H	"Goodbye, Radar"	Ken Levine & David Isaacs	CBS
1979 (32nd)	M*A*S*H	"Period of Adjustment"	Jim Mulligan & John Rappaport	CBS
1979 (32nd)	M*A*S*H	"The Young and the Restless"	Mitch Markowitz	CBS
1979 (32nd)	Mork & Mindy	"Dr. Morkenstein"	Bruce Kalish & Philip John Taylor	ABC
1979 (32nd)	Mork & Mindy	"Mork's Mixed Emotions"	Tom Tenowich & Ed Scharlach	ABC
1979 (32nd)	Taxi	"Elaine's Secret Admirer"	Barry Kemp	ABC
1979 (32nd)	Taxi	"Honor Thy Father"	Glen and Les Charles	ABC

=== 1980s ===
Year	Series	Episode	Winners/nominees	Network
1980 (33rd)
1980 (33rd)	M*A*S*H	"Heal Thyself"	Story by : Dennis Koenig and Gene Reynolds; Teleplay by : Dennis Koenig	CBS
1980 (33rd)	The Associates	"The Censors"	Stan Daniels & Ed. Weinberger	ABC
1980 (33rd)	Barney Miller	"The Child Stealers"	Frank Dungan & Jeff Stein	ABC
1980 (33rd)	M*A*S*H	"Bottle Fatigue"	Thad Mumford & Dan Wilcox	CBS
1980 (33rd)	M*A*S*H	"Morale Victory"	John Rappaport	CBS
1980 (33rd)	Taxi	"Alex Jumps Out of an Airplane"	Ken Estin	ABC
1980 (33rd)	Taxi	"Art Work"	Glen and Les Charles	ABC
1980 (33rd)	United States	"Sometimes"	Larry Gelbart & Everett Greenbaum	NBC
1981 (34th)
1981 (34th)	Barney Miller	"Stormy Weather"	Nat Mauldin	ABC
1981 (34th)	Barney Miller	"Field Associate"	Jordan Moffet	ABC
1981 (34th)	The Greatest American Hero	"Pilot"	Stephen J. Cannell	ABC
1981 (34th)	M*A*S*H	"No Sweat"	John Rappaport	CBS
1981 (34th)	M*A*S*H	"A War for All Seasons"	Dan Wilcox & Thad Mumford	CBS
1981 (34th)	Park Place	"Crazy Judge"	Reinhold Weege	CBS
1981 (34th)	Taxi	"The Boss' Wife"	Ken Estin	ABC
1981 (34th)	Taxi	"Tony's Sister and Jim"	Michael Leeson	ABC
1982 (35th)
1982 (35th)	Barney Miller	"Hunger Strike"	Story by : Tony Sheehan & Stephen Neigher; Teleplay by : Tony Sheehan	ABC
1982 (35th)	Best of the West	"The Calico Kid Returns"	Mitch Markowitz	ABC
1982 (35th)	M*A*S*H	"The Birthday Girls"	Karen Hall	CBS
1982 (35th)	Making the Grade	"Pilot"	Gary David Goldberg	CBS
1982 (35th)	Open All Night	"Terry Runs Away"	Ken Levine & David Isaacs	ABC
1982 (35th)	Taxi	"Elegant Iggy"	Ken Estin	ABC
1983 (34th)
1983 (34th)	Cheers	"The Boys in the Bar"	Ken Levine & David Isaacs	NBC
1983 (34th)	Cheers	"Give Me a Ring Sometime"	Glen and Les Charles	NBC
1983 (34th)	Cheers	"Let Me Count the Ways"	Heide Perlman	NBC
1983 (34th)	Cheers	"The Spy Who Came in for a Cold One"	David Lloyd	NBC
1983 (34th)	M*A*S*H	"Goodbye, Farewell, and Amen"	Alan Alda, Burt Metcalfe, John Rappaport, Dan Wilcox, Thad Mumford, Elias Davis, David Pollock and Karen Hall	CBS
1983 (34th)	Taxi	"Jim's Inheritance"	Ken Estin	NBC
1983 (34th)	Taxi	"Scenskees from a Marriage"	Howard Gewirtz & Ian Praiser	NBC
1984 (37th)
1984 (37th)	Cheers	"Sumner's Return"	Michael J. Weithorn	NBC
1984 (37th)	AfterMASH	"Night Shift"	Everett Greenbaum & Elliott Reid	CBS
1984 (37th)	Cheers	"Affairs of the Heart"	Heide Perlman	NBC
1984 (37th)	Cheers	"Old Flames"	David Angell	NBC
1984 (37th)	The Duck Factory	"Goodbye Buddy, Hello Skip"	Allan Burns	NBC
1984 (37th)	Family Ties	"Not an Affair to Remember"	Gary David Goldberg & Ruth Bennett	NBC
1984 (37th)	Night Court	"Once in Love with Harry"	Reinhold Weege	NBC
1984 (37th)	Too Close for Comfort	"Ship Mates"	Arne Sultan & Earl Barret	ABC
1985 (38th)
1985 (38th)	Moonlighting	"Pilot"	Glenn Gordon Caron	ABC
1985 (38th)	Steambath	"Madison Avenue Madness"	David Pollock & Elias Davis	Showtime
1985 (38th)	Cheers	"The Executive's Executioner"	Heide Perlman	NBC
1985 (38th)	Cheers	"Fairy Tales Can Come True"	Sam Simon	NBC
1985 (38th)	The Cosby Show	"Good-Bye Mr. Fish"	Earl Pomerantz	NBC
1985 (38th)	Webster	"The Uh-Oh Feeling"	Steven Sunshine & Madeline Sunshine	ABC
1986 (39th)
1986 (39th)	Kate & Allie	"Allie's Affair"	Bob Randall	CBS
1986 (39th)	All Is Forgiven	"I Can't Say No"	Ian Praiser & Howard Gewirtz	NBC
1986 (39th)	The Cosby Show	"Theo's Holiday"	John Markus, Carmen Finestra & Matt Williams	NBC
1986 (39th)	The Golden Girls	"Rose's Mother"	James Berg & Stan Zimmerman	NBC
1986 (39th)	Night Court	"Best of Friends"	Howard Ostroff	NBC
1987 (40th)
1987 (40th)	The Days and Nights of Molly Dodd	"Here's Why Cosmetics Should Come in Unbreakable Bottles"	Jay Tarses	NBC
1987 (40th)	Family Ties	"A, My Name is Alex"	Gary David Goldberg & Alan Uger	NBC
1987 (40th)	The Golden Girls	"Twas the Nightmare Before Christmas"	Barry Fanaro & Mort Nathan	NBC
1987 (40th)	Cheers	"Never Love a Goalie, Part I"	Ken Levine & David Isaacs	NBC
1987 (40th)	Family Ties	"My Back Pages"	Ruth Bennett	NBC
1987 (40th)	The Golden Girls	"A Piece of Cake"	Kathy Speer, Terry Grossman, Mort Nathan and Barry Fanaro	NBC
1987 (40th)	Night Court	"Contempt of Courting"	Tom Straw	NBC
1988 (41st)
1988 (41st)	The Wonder Years	"My Father's Office"	Carol Black & Neal Marlens	ABC
1988 (41st)	Family Ties	"The Way We Were"	Gary David Goldberg	NBC
1988 (41st)	The Golden Girls	"Old Friends"	Kathy Speer & Terry Grossman	NBC
1988 (41st)	Night Court	"No Hard Feelings"	Tom Straw	NBC
1988 (41st)	The Slap Maxwell Story	"Pilot"	Jay Tarses	ABC
1988 (41st)	The Wonder Years	"Pilot"	Neal Marlens & Carol Black	ABC
1989 (42nd)
1989 (42nd)	The Wonder Years	"Coda"	Todd W. Langen	ABC
1989 (42nd)	Cheers	"Jumping Jerks"	Ken Levine & David Isaacs	NBC
1989 (42nd)	Cheers	"Please, Mr. Postman"	Brian Pollack & Mert Rich	NBC
1989 (42nd)	The Days and Nights of Molly Dodd	"Here's Why You Order From the Spanish Side of the Menu"	Eric Overmyer	Lifetime
1989 (42nd)	Murphy Brown	"Respect"	Diane English	CBS
1989 (42nd)	The Wonder Years	"Pottery Will Get You Nowhere"	Matthew Carlson	ABC

=== 1990s ===
Year	Series	Episode	Winners/nominees	Network
1990 (43rd)
1990 (43rd)	Murphy Brown	"Brown Like Me"	Diane English	CBS
1990 (43rd)	Designing Women	"The First Day of the Last Decade of the Entire Twentieth Century"	Linda Bloodworth-Thomason	CBS
1990 (43rd)	Seinfeld	"The Stake Out"	Larry David & Jerry Seinfeld	NBC
1990 (43rd)	The Wonder Years	"Good-bye"	Bob Brush	ABC
1990 (43rd)	The Wonder Years	"The Powers That Be"	David M. Stern	ABC
1990 (43rd)	The Wonder Years	"Rock 'N' Roll"	Bob Stevens	ABC
1991 (44th)
1991 (44th)	Cheers	"Rat Girl"	Ken Levine & David Isaacs	NBC
1991 (44th)	Coach	"Christmas Brains"	John Peaslee & Judd Pillott	ABC
1991 (44th)	The Days and Nights of Molly Dodd	"Here's a Little Touch of Harry in the Night"	Jay Tarses	Lifetime
1991 (44th)	Evening Shade	"A Day in the Life of Wood Newton"	Linda Bloodworth-Thomason	CBS
1991 (44th)	The Golden Girls	"Ebbtide's Revenge"	Marc Sotkin	NBC
1992 (45th)
1992 (45th)	Murphy Brown	"Uh-Oh, Part 2"	Story by : Korby Siamis & Diane English; Teleplay by : Diane English	CBS
1992 (45th)	Brooklyn Bridge	"When Irish Eyes Are Smiling"	Gary David Goldberg	CBS
1992 (45th)	Seinfeld	"The New Friend"	Larry David & Larry Levin	NBC
1992 (45th)	Seinfeld	"The Parking Space"	Larry David & Greg Daniels	NBC
1992 (45th)	Seinfeld	"The Stranded"	Larry David, Jerry Seinfeld and Matt Goldman	NBC
1993 (46th)
1993 (46th)	Seinfeld	"The Contest"	Larry David	NBC
1993 (46th)	Roseanne	"The Dark Ages"	Eric Gilliland & Mike Gandolfi	ABC
1993 (46th)	Roseanne	"Wait 'Til Your Father Gets Home"	Amy Sherman	ABC
1993 (46th)	Seinfeld	"The Outing"	Larry Charles	NBC
1994 (47th)
1994 (47th)	Seinfeld	"The Mango"	Story by : Lawrence H. Levy; Teleplay by : Lawrence H. Levy & Larry David	NBC
1994 (47th)	Frasier	"A Midwinter Night's Dream"	Chuck Ranberg & Anne Flett-Giordano	NBC
1994 (47th)	Roseanne	"Don't Ask, Don't Tell"	Story by : Michael Borkow; Teleplay by : James Berg & Stan Zimmerman	ABC
1994 (47th)	Roseanne	"A Stash from the Past"	Kevin Abbott	ABC
1994 (47th)	Seinfeld	"The Hamptons"	Peter Mehlman & Carol Leifer	NBC
1995 (48th)
1995 (48th)	Frasier	"The Matchmaker"	Joe Keenan	NBC
1995 (48th)	Frasier	"The Club"	Elias Davis & David Pollock	NBC
1995 (48th)	Friends	"The One Where Underdog Gets Away"	Jeff Greenstein & Jeff Strauss	NBC
1995 (48th)	The Larry Sanders Show	"Arthur After Hours"	Peter Tolan	HBO
1995 (48th)	The Larry Sanders Show	"Hank's New Assistant"	John Riggi	HBO
1995 (48th)	The Larry Sanders Show	"Roseanne's Return"	Story by : Garry Shandling; Teleplay by : Maya Forbes and Steven Levitan	HBO
1995 (48th)	Mad About You	"Our Fifteen Minutes"	Jack Burditt	NBC
1995 (48th)	Mad About You	"The Ride Home"	Liz Coe	NBC
1996 (49th)
1996 (49th)	Seinfeld	"The Pool Guy"	David Mandel	NBC
1996 (49th)	The Larry Sanders Show	"Eight"	Peter Tolan	HBO
1996 (49th)	Seinfeld	"The Soup Nazi"	Spike Feresten	NBC
1996 (49th)	Seinfeld	"The Sponge"	Peter Mehlman	NBC
1997 (50th)
1997 (50th)	Seinfeld	"The Fatigues"	Greg Kavet & Andy Robin	NBC
1997 (50th)	Ellen	"The Puppy Episode"	Story by : Ellen DeGeneres; Teleplay by : Mark Driscoll, Dava Savel, Tracy Newman and Jonathan Stark	ABC
1997 (50th)	Frasier	"The Impossible Dream"	Rob Greenberg	NBC
1997 (50th)	The Larry Sanders Show	"The Book"	Maya Forbes	HBO
1997 (50th)	The Larry Sanders Show	"Ellen, or Isn't She?"	Story by : Garry Shandling, Judd Apatow and John Markus; Teleplay by : Judd Apatow and John Markus	HBO
1997 (50th)	Seinfeld	"The Bizarro Jerry"	David H. Mandel	NBC
1997 (50th)	Seinfeld	"The Chicken Roaster"	Alec Berg & Jeff Schaffer	NBC
1998 (51st)
1998 (51st)	Frasier	"Frasier's Imaginary Friend"	Rob Greenberg	NBC
1998 (51st)	Dharma & Greg	"Pilot"	Dottie Dartland & Chuck Lorre	ABC
1998 (51st)	Ellen	"Emma"	Lawrence Broch	ABC
1998 (51st)	Murphy Brown	"Never Can Say Goodbye"	Diane English	CBS
1999 (52nd)
1999 (52nd)	Frasier	"Merry Christmas, Mrs. Moskowitz"	Jay Kogen	NBC
1999 (52nd)	Dharma & Greg	"The Paper Hat Anniversary"	Story by : Chuck Lorre; Teleplay by : Bill Prady and Eric Zicklin	ABC
1999 (52nd)	Friends	"The One Where Everybody Finds Out"	Alexa Junge	NBC
1999 (52nd)	Sex and the City	"Evolution"	Cindy Chupack	HBO
1999 (52nd)	Sex and the City	"Four Women and a Funeral"	Jenny Bicks	HBO

=== 2000s ===
Year	Series	Episode	Winners/nominees	Network
2000 (53rd)
2000 (53rd)	Frasier	"Something Borrowed, Someone Blue"	Christopher Lloyd & Joe Keenan	NBC
2000 (53rd)	Frasier	"Out with Dad"	Joe Keenan	NBC
2000 (53rd)	Sex and the City	"Attack of the Five Foot Ten Woman"	Cindy Chupack	HBO
2000 (53rd)	Sex and the City	"Ex and the City"	Michael Patrick King	HBO
2000 (53rd)	Will & Grace	"Hey La, Hey La, My Ex-Boyfriend's Back"	Jeff Greenstein	NBC
2001 (54th)
2001 (54th)	Everybody Loves Raymond	"Italy"	Philip Rosenthal	CBS
2001 (54th)	Malcolm in the Middle	"Bowling"	Alex Reid	Fox
2001 (54th)	Malcolm in the Middle	"The Grandparents"	Gary Murphy & Neil Thompson	Fox
2001 (54th)	Sex and the City	"Just Say Yes"	Cindy Chupack	HBO
2001 (54th)	Sex and the City	"My Motherboard, My Self"	Julie Rottenberg & Elisa Zuritsky	HBO
2001 (54th)	Titus	"The Pendulum"	Christopher Titus	Fox
2002 (55th)
2002 (55th)	Frasier	"Rooms with a View"	Dan O'Shannon, Lori Kirkland and Bob Daily	NBC
2002 (55th)	The Bernie Mac Show	"Pilot"	Larry Wilmore	Fox
2002 (55th)	Ed	"The Wedding"	Rob Burnett & Jon Beckerman	NBC
2002 (55th)	Scrubs	"My First Day"	Bill Lawrence	NBC
2002 (55th)	Sex and the City	"Change of a Dress"	Julie Rottenberg & Elisa Zuritsky	HBO
2002 (55th)	Sex and the City	"I Heart N.Y."	Michael Patrick King	HBO
2002 (55th)	Sex and the City	"Plus One Is the Loneliest Number"	Cindy Chupack	HBO
2003 (56th)
2003 (56th)	Frasier	"No Sex, Please, We're Skittish"	Bob Daily	NBC
2003 (56th)	Malcolm in the Middle	"Day Care"	Gary Murphy & Neil Thompson	Fox
2003 (56th)	Malcolm in the Middle	"Malcolm Films Reese"	Dan Kopelman	Fox
2003 (56th)	Sex and the City	"A Woman's Right to Shoes"	Jenny Bicks	HBO
2004 (57th)
2004 (57th)	Arrested Development	"Pier Pressure"	Jim Vallely & Mitchell Hurwitz	Fox
2004 (57th)	Malcolm in the Middle	"Ida's Boyfriend"	Neil Thompson	Fox
2004 (57th)	Sex and the City	"The Ick Factor"	Julie Rottenberg & Elisa Zuritsky	HBO
2004 (57th)	Sex and the City	"Splat!"	Jenny Bicks & Cindy Chupack	HBO
2004 (57th)	Wonderfalls	"The Wax Lion"	Story by : Todd Holland & Bryan Fuller; Teleplay by : Bryan Fuller	Fox
2005 (58th)
2005 (58th)	Weeds	"You Can't Miss the Bear"	Jenji Kohan	Showtime
2005 (58th)	Desperate Housewives	"Next"	Jenna Bans & Kevin Murphy	ABC
2005 (58th)	Kitchen Confidential	"Exile on Main Street"	David Hemingson	Fox
2005 (58th)	Malcolm in the Middle	"Motivational Speaker"	Rob Ulin	Fox
2005 (58th)	My Name Is Earl	"Pilot"	Greg Garcia	NBC
2005 (58th)	The Office	"Diversity Day"	B. J. Novak	NBC
2006 (59th)
2006 (59th)	The Office	"Casino Night"	Steve Carell	NBC
2006 (59th)	Desperate Housewives	"Don't Look at Me"	Josh Senter	ABC
2006 (59th)	Desperate Housewives	"It Takes Two"	Kevin Murphy & Jenna Bans	ABC
2006 (59th)	Malcolm in the Middle	"Bomb Shelter"	Rob Ulin	Fox
2006 (59th)	My Name Is Earl	"Jump for Joy"	Vali Chandrasekaran	NBC
2006 (59th)	The Office	"The Coup"	Paul Lieberstein	NBC
2007 (60th)
2007 (60th)	The Office	"The Job"	Paul Lieberstein & Michael Schur	NBC
2007 (60th)	30 Rock	"Hard Ball"	Matt Hubbard	NBC
2007 (60th)	Flight of the Conchords	"Sally Returns"	James Bobin, Jemaine Clement and Bret McKenzie	HBO
2007 (60th)	The Office	"Local Ad"	B. J. Novak	NBC
2007 (60th)	The Office	"Phyllis' Wedding"	Caroline Williams	NBC
2007 (60th)	Pushing Daisies	"Pie-lette"	Bryan Fuller	ABC
2008 (61st)
2008 (61st)	30 Rock	"Succession"	Andrew Guest & John Riggi	NBC
2008 (61st)	30 Rock	"Believe in the Stars"	Robert Carlock	NBC
2008 (61st)	30 Rock	"Cooter"	Tina Fey	NBC
2008 (61st)	My Name Is Earl	"Monkeys Take a Bath"	Greg Garcia	NBC
2008 (61st)	The Office	"Crime Aid"	Charlie Grandy	NBC
2008 (61st)	Ugly Betty	"Crush'd"	Tracy Poust & Jon Kinnally	ABC
2009 (61st)
2009 (61st)	30 Rock	"Apollo, Apollo"	Robert Carlock	NBC
2009 (61st)	Modern Family	"Pilot"	Steven Levitan & Christopher Lloyd	ABC
2009 (61st)	30 Rock	"Reunion"	Matt Hubbard	NBC
2009 (61st)	Eastbound & Down	"Chapter 1"	Ben Best, Jody Hill and Danny McBride	HBO
2009 (61st)	The Office	"Broke"	Charles Grandy	NBC
2009 (61st)	The Office	"Gossip"	Paul Lieberstein	NBC

=== 2010s ===
Year	Series	Episode	Winners/nominees	Network
2010 (63rd)
2010 (63rd)	30 Rock	"When It Rains, It Pours"	Robert Carlock	NBC
2010 (63rd)	30 Rock	"Anna Howard Shaw Day"	Matt Hubbard	NBC
2010 (63rd)	Modern Family	"Earthquake"	Paul Corrigan & Brad Walsh	ABC
2010 (63rd)	Modern Family	"Starry Night"	Danny Zuker	ABC
2010 (63rd)	The Office	"WUPHF.com"	Aaron Shure	NBC
2010 (63rd)	The Sarah Silverman Program	"NightMayor"	Dan Sterling	Comedy Central
2011 (64th)
2011 (64th)	Modern Family	"Caught in the Act"	Steven Levitan & Jeffrey Richman	ABC
2011 (64th)	30 Rock	"Queen of Jordan"	Tracey Wigfield	NBC
2011 (64th)	Modern Family	"Mother's Day"	Dan O'Shannon & Ilana Wernick	ABC
2011 (64th)	The Office	"Goodbye, Michael: Part 2"	Greg Daniels	NBC
2011 (64th)	The Office	"PDA"	Robert Padnick	NBC
2011 (64th)	Weeds	"Object Impermanence"	Stephen Falk	Showtime
2012 (65th)
2012 (65th)	Modern Family	"Virgin Territory"	Elaine Ko	ABC
2012 (65th)	30 Rock	"Leap Day"	Luke Del Tredici	NBC
2012 (65th)	Episodes	"Episode Nine"	David Crane & Jeffrey Klarik	Showtime
2012 (65th)	Modern Family	"Little Bo Bleep"	Cindy Chupack	ABC
2012 (65th)	Modern Family	"Mistery Date"	Jeffrey Richman	ABC
2012 (65th)	Parks and Recreation	"The Debate"	Amy Poehler	NBC
2013 (66th)
2013 (66th)	30 Rock	"Hogcock!"	Jack Burditt & Robert Carlock	NBC
2013 (66th)	Modern Family	"Career Day"	Paul Corrigan & Brad Walsh	ABC
2013 (66th)	Modern Family	"Farm Strong"	Elaine Ko	ABC
2013 (66th)	Orange Is the New Black	"I Wasn't Ready"	Liz Friedman & Jenji Kohan	Netflix
2013 (66th)	Orange Is the New Black	"Lesbian Request Denied"	Sian Heder	Netflix
2013 (66th)	Parks and Recreation	"Leslie and Ben"	Michael Schur & Alan Yang	NBC
2014 (67th)
2014 (67th)	Louie	"So Did the Fat Lady"	Louis C.K.	FX
2014 (67th)	Modern Family	"The Cold"	Rick Wiener & Kenny Schwartz	ABC
2014 (67th)	Modern Family	"Three Dinners"	Abraham Higginbotham, Steven Levitan & Jeffrey Richman	ABC
2014 (67th)	New Girl	"Landline"	Rob Rosell	Fox
2014 (67th)	Orange Is the New Black	"Low Self Esteem City"	Nick Jones	Netflix
2014 (67th)	Transparent	"The Wilderness"	Ethan Kuperberg	Amazon
2015 (68th)
2015 (68th)	Silicon Valley	"Sand Hill Shuffle"	Clay Tarver	HBO
2015 (68th)	Black-ish	"Rock, Paper, Scissors, Gun"	Peter Saji	ABC
2015 (68th)	The Last Man on Earth	"Alive in Tucson"	Will Forte	Fox
2015 (68th)	Maron	"Racegate"	Dave Anthony	IFC
2015 (68th)	Modern Family	"Connection Lost"	Megan Ganz & Steven Levitan	ABC
2015 (68th)	Veep	"Joint Session"	Story by : Armando Iannucci & Simon Blackwell & Georgia Pritchett; Teleplay by : Simon Blackwell & Georgia Pritchett	HBO
2016 (69th)
2016 (69th)	Unbreakable Kimmy Schmidt	"Kimmy Goes on a Playdate!"	Robert Carlock	Netflix
2016 (69th)	Atlanta	"Streets on Lock"	Stephen Glover	FX
2016 (69th)	One Mississippi	"Pilot"	Diablo Cody & Tig Notaro	Amazon
2016 (69th)	Son of Zorn	"A Taste of Zephyria"	Dan Mintz	Fox
2016 (69th)	Speechless	"R-A-Y-C-Ray-Cation"	Carrie Rosen & Seth Kurland	ABC
2016 (69th)	Unbreakable Kimmy Schmidt	"Kimmy Finds Her Mom!"	Tina Fey & Sam Means	Netflix
2017 (70th)
2017 (70th)	Will & Grace	"Rosario's Quinceanera"	Tracy Poust & Jon Kinnally	NBC
2017 (70th)	The Carmichael Show	"Intervention"	Willie Hunter	NBC
2017 (70th)	Grace and Frankie	"The Burglary"	Brendan McCarthy & David Budin	Netflix
2017 (70th)	Trial & Error	"Chapter 13: The Verdict"	Jeff Astrof	NBC
2017 (70th)	Veep	"Judge"	Ted Cohen	HBO
2018 (71st)
2018 (71st)	Barry	"Chapter One: Make Your Mark"	Alec Berg & Bill Hader	HBO
2018 (71st)	Forever	"Another Place"	Story by : Aniz Adam Ansari; Teleplay by : Alan Yang & Matt Hubbard	Amazon
2018 (71st)	The Kids Are Alright	"Pilot"	Tim Doyle	ABC
2018 (71st)	Orange Is the New Black	"Who Knows Better Than I"	Jenji Kohan	Netflix
2018 (71st)	Santa Clarita Diet	"Halibut!"	Victor Fresco	Netflix
2018 (71st)	Unbreakable Kimmy Schmidt	"Kimmy and the Beest!"	Robert Carlock	Netflix
2019 (72nd)
2019 (72nd)	Dead to Me	"Pilot"	Liz Feldman	Netflix
2019 (72nd)	Living with Yourself	"Nice Knowing You"	Timothy Greenberg	Netflix
2019 (72nd)	The Marvelous Mrs. Maisel	"It's Comedy or Cabbage"	Amy Sherman-Palladino	Amazon
2019 (72nd)	Orange Is the New Black	"Here's Where We Get Off"	Jenji Kohan	Netflix
2019 (72nd)	On Becoming a God in Central Florida	"The Stinker Thinker"	Robert F. Funke and Matt Lutsky	Showtime
2019 (72nd)	Veep	"Veep"	David Mandel	HBO

=== 2020s ===
Year	Series	Episode	Winners/nominees	Network
2020 (73rd)
2020 (73rd)	The Great	"The Great"	Tony McNamara	Hulu
2020 (73rd)	Awkwafina Is Nora from Queens	"Grandma & Chill"	Kyle Lau	Comedy Central
2020 (73rd)	Dead to Me	"It's Not You, It's Me"	Liz Feldman & Kelly Hutchinson	Netflix
2020 (73rd)	Grace and Frankie	"The Tank"	Alex Kavallierou	Netflix
2020 (73rd)	High Maintenance	"Trick"	Isaac Oliver	HBO
2020 (73rd)	Ted Lasso	"Pilot"	Story by : Jason Sudeikis, Bill Lawrence, Brendan Hunt and Joe Kelly; Teleplay by : Jason Sudeikis and Bill Lawrence	Apple TV+
2021 (74th)
2021 (74th)	The Great	"Alone at Last"	Tony McNamara	Hulu
2021 (74th)	Dave	"Enlightened Dave"	Luvh Rakhe & Lee Sung Jin	FXX
2021 (74th)	Only Murders in the Building	"True Crime"	Steve Martin & John Hoffman	Hulu
2021 (74th)	Reservation Dogs	"F*ckin' Rez Dogs"	Sterlin Harjo & Taika Waititi	FX on Hulu
2021 (74th)	Superstore	"All Sales Final"	Story by : Justin Spitzer; Teleplay by : Jonathan Green & Gabe Miller	NBC
2021 (74th)	The Wonder Years	"Pilot"	Saladin K. Patterson	ABC
2022 (75th)
2022 (75th)	Hacks	"The One, The Only"	Lucia Aniello, Paul W. Downs and Jen Statsky	HBO Max
2022 (75th)	The Bear	"Braciole"	Joanna Calo & Christopher Storer	FX on Hulu
2022 (75th)	Grace and Frankie	"The Beginning"	Marta Kauffman & Howard J. Morris	Netflix
2022 (75th)	Julia	"Foie Gras"	Daniel Goldfarb & Christopher Keyser	HBO Max
2022 (75th)	Reservation Dogs	"Wide Net"	Tazbah Rose Chavez	FX on Hulu
2022 (75th)	What We Do in the Shadows	"Private School"	Ayo Edebiri & Shana Gohd	FX
2023 (76th)
2023 (76th)	Poker Face	"Escape from Shit Mountain"	Nora Zuckerman & Lilla Zuckerman	Peacock
2023 (76th)	The Bear	"Fishes"	Joanna Calo & Christopher Storer	FX on Hulu
2023 (76th)	The Bear	"Forks"	Alex Russell	FX on Hulu
2023 (76th)	The Great	"Ice"	Tony McNamara	Hulu
2023 (76th)	Reservation Dogs	"House Made of Bongs"	Tommy Pico and Sterlin Harjo	FX on Hulu
2023 (76th)	What We Do in the Shadows	"Pride Parade"	Jake Bender and Zach Dunn	FX
2024 (77th)
2024 (77th)	Hacks	"Bulletproof"	Lucia Aniello, Paul W. Downs and Jen Statsky	Max
2024 (77th)	The Bear	"Napkins"	Catherine Schetina	FX on Hulu
2024 (77th)	English Teacher	"Linda"	Jake Bender & Zach Dunn	FX on Hulu
2024 (77th)	Only Murders in the Building	"Once Upon a Time in the West"	John Hoffman and Joshua Allen Griffith	Hulu
2024 (77th)	Somebody Somewhere	"AGG"	Hannah Bos & Paul Thureen and Bridget Everett	HBO
2024 (77th)	The Sticky	"Petiole"	Brian Donovan & Ed Herro	Prime Video
2025 (78th)
2025 (78th)	The Righteous Gemstones	"Prelude"	John Carcieri, Jeff Fradley & Danny McBride	HBO
2025 (78th)	The Bear	"Worms"	Ayo Edebiri & Lionel Boyce	FX on Hulu
2025 (78th)	Mo	"A Call from God"	Mohammed Amer & Harris Danow	Netflix
2025 (78th)	Poker Face	"The Sleazy Georgian"	Megan Amram	Peacock
2025 (78th)	The Rehearsal	"Pilot's Code"	Nathan Fielder, Carrie Kemper, Adam Locke-Norton & Eric Notarnicola	HBO
2025 (78th)	The Studio	"The Promotion"	Seth Rogen, Evan Goldberg, Peter Huyck, Alex Gregory & Frida Perez	Apple TV

== Total awards ==
- NBC – 25
- CBS – 20
- ABC – 11
- Fox – 2
- Showtime – 2
- HBO – 2
- FX – 1
- Netflix – 1
- Peacock – 1

== Writers with multiple awards ==
4 awards

- Robert Carlock

3 awards

- Larry Gelbart

2 awards

- Lucia Aniello
- Sam Bobrick
- Bob Daily
- Larry David
- Paul W. Downs
- Diane English
- Jim Fritzell
- Gary David Goldberg
- Everett Greenbaum
- Bill Idelson
- David Isaacs
- Joe Keenan
- Ken Levine
- Steven Levitan
- Christopher Lloyd
- Jen Statsky

== Programs with multiple awards ==
7 awards

- M*A*S*H (CBS)

6 awards

- Frasier (NBC)

4 awards

- 30 Rock (NBC)
- Seinfeld (NBC)

3 awards

- Cheers (NBC) (Note: Cheers' double win in 1983 is counted as only one win.)
- The Dick Van Dyke Show (CBS)
- Modern Family (ABC)

2 awards

- Barney Miller (ABC)
- The Great (Hulu)
- Hacks (HBO Max/Max)
- Murphy Brown (CBS)
- The Office (NBC)
- The Wonder Years (ABC)

== Writers with multiple nominations ==
7 nominations

- David Isaacs
- Ken Levine

6 nominations

- Robert Carlock
- Cindy Chupack
- Larry David
- Larry Gelbart
- Gary David Goldberg

5 nominations

- Allan Burns
- Ken Estin
- Everett Greenbaum
- Steven Levitan
- David Lloyd
- Laurence Marks
- Reinhold Weege

4 nominations

- Bob Ellison
- Diane English
- Matt Hubbard
- Jenji Kohan
- Thad Mumford
- John Rappaport
- Arne Sultan
- Ed. Weinberger
- Dan Wilcox

3 nominations

- Jerry Belson
- Jenny Bicks
- James L. Brooks
- Glen Charles
- Les Charles
- Stan Daniels
- Elias Davis
- Jim Fritzell
- Chris Hayward
- Joe Keenan
- Paul Lieberstein
- David Mandel
- Garry Marshall
- Tony McNamara
- Heidi Perlman
- David Pollock
- Jeffrey Richman
- Julie Rottenberg
- Jay Tarses
- Neil Thompson
- Elisa Zuritsky

2 nominations

- Alan Alda
- Lucia Aniello
- Jenna Bans
- Earl Barret
- Jake Bender
- Ruth Bennett
- Alec Berg
- James Berg
- Carol Black
- Linda Bloodworth-Thomason
- Sam Bobrick
- Jack Burditt
- Joanna Calo
- Paul Corrigan
- Bob Daily
- Greg Daniels
- Paul W. Downs
- Zach Dunn
- Jack Elinson
- Barry Fanaro
- Liz Feldman
- Tina Fey
- Maya Forbes
- Bryan Fuller
- Greg Garcia
- Lila Garrett
- Howard Gewirtz
- Charlie Grandy
- Rob Greenberg
- Terry Grossman
- Karen Hall
- Sterlin Harjo
- John Hoffman
- Bill Idelson
- Milt Josefsberg
- Bernie Kahn
- Barry Kemp
- Michael Patrick King
- Jon Kinnally
- Carl Kleinschmitt
- Elaine Ko
- Mort Lachman
- Bill Larkin
- Bill Lawrence
- Charles Lee
- Michael Leeson
- Alan J. Levitt
- Christopher Lloyd
- Chuck Lorre
- Mitch Markowitz
- Neal Marlens
- John Markus
- Danny McBride
- Dale McRaven
- Peter Mehlman
- Rick Mittleman
- Gary Murphy
- Kevin Murphy
- Mort Nathan
- B. J. Novak
- Dan O'Shannon
- Rod Parker
- Tracy Poust
- Ian Praiser
- John Rapp
- Carl Reiner
- Gene Reynolds
- Larry Rhine
- John Riggi
- Aaron Ruben
- Bob Schiller
- Jerry Seinfeld
- Michael Schur
- Garry Shandling
- Tony Sheehan
- Amy Sherman-Palladino
- Kathy Speer
- Jen Statsky
- Leonard B. Stern
- Charles Stewart
- Walter Stone
- Christopher Storer
- Tom Straw
- Norman Sullivan
- George Tibbles
- Peter Tolan
- Mel Tolkin
- Rob Ulin
- Brad Walsh
- Bob Weiskopf
- Lester A. White
- Jack Winter
- Alan Yang
- Stan Zimmerman

== Programs with multiple nominations ==
26 nominations

- M*A*S*H (CBS)

14 nominations

- Seinfeld (NBC)

13 nominations

- Cheers (NBC)
- Modern Family (ABC)

12 nominations

- The Office (NBC)
- Sex and the City (HBO)
- Taxi (ABC), (NBC)

11 nominations

- 30 Rock (NBC)
- All in the Family (CBS)

10 nominations

- Frasier (NBC)
- The Mary Tyler Moore Show (CBS)

9 nominations

- Barney Miller (ABC)

8 nominations

- The Dick Van Dyke Show (CBS)

7 nominations

- Malcolm in the Middle (Fox)
- The Wonder Years (ABC)

6 nominations

- The Larry Sanders Show (HBO)

5 nominations

- The Bear (FX on Hulu)
- Get Smart (NBC), (CBS)
- The Golden Girls (NBC)
- Orange is the New Black (Netflix)

4 nominations

- Family Ties (NBC)
- Murphy Brown (CBS)
- Night Court (NBC)
- Rhoda (CBS)
- Roseanne (ABC)

3 nominations

- The Days and Nights of Molly Dodd (NBC), (Lifetime)
- Desperate Housewives (ABC)
- Grace and Frankie (Netflix)
- The Great (Hulu)
- He & She (CBS)
- Mork & Mindy (ABC)
- My Name Is Earl (NBC)
- Reservation Dogs (FX on Hulu)
- Room 222 (ABC)
- Unbreakable Kimmy Schmidt (Netflix)
- Veep (HBO)

2 nominations

- The Bob Newhart Show (CBS)
- The Cosby Show (NBC)
- The Danny Thomas Show (CBS)
- Dead to Me (Netflix)
- Dharma & Greg (ABC)
- Ellen (ABC)
- Friends (NBC)
- Hacks (HBO Max/Max)
- The Jackie Gleason Show (CBS)
- Mad About You (NBC)
- Maude (CBS)
- My World and Welcome to It (NBC)
- Only Murders in the Building (Hulu)
- Parks and Recreation (NBC)
- Poker Face (Peacock)
- Weeds (Showtime)
- What We Do in the Shadows (FX)
- Will & Grace (NBC)
