= As Time Goes By (M*A*S*H) =

- M*A*S*H episode
- Episode no.: Season 11; Episode 15
- Directed by: Burt Metcalfe
- Written by: Thad Mumford; Dan Wilcox
- Production code: 9-B10
- Original air date: February 21, 1983

Guest appearances
- Rosalind Chao as Soon-Lee; G.W. Bailey as Rizzo; Jeff Maxwell as Igor

Episode chronology
| ← Previous "Give and Take" | Next → "Goodbye, Farewell and Amen" |
- M*A*S*H season 11

"As Time Goes By" is the 255th episode of M*A*S*H, as well as the last episode filmed. The episode aired on February 21, 1983 on CBS. As it was the final episode filmed they took a moment to pay tribute to the characters (except for Trapper John McIntyre) who had left the series before its conclusion. It also introduces the character of Soon-Lee, who would play a vital role in the series' final episode and the short-lived spin-off AfterMASH.

The episode is dedicated to Connie Izay, RN, one of the show's medical advisors, who died before the episode aired.

Although this was the penultimate episode of the series, it was the final episode produced, wrapping on January 14, 1983 at exactly 6:05 p.m. The series finale, "Goodbye, Farewell and Amen", had been filmed earlier in the season's production schedule.

== Synopsis ==
The episode opens in the Officer's Club, with Sgt. Rizzo sleeping at the bar. B.J. shouts "is the general's Jeep ready?", causing Rizzo to jump out of his slumber. Rizzo seeks revenge, and decides to get it using a dummy hand grenade he borrows from Igor. Winchester reads a story in the newspaper about a new skyscraper in Los Angeles that will have a time capsule placed in its cornerstone. Major Houlihan becomes enamoured with this idea and decides to place a time capsule to commemorate the 4077. Hawkeye also likes the idea, and volunteers to help Houlihan. Hawkeye later confides to B.J. and Winchester that Houlihan's time capsule would only represent the army side of their lives, and he wants to be sure to include something to represent "us malcontents".

Father Mulcahy helps a distraught elderly Korean couple board a transport headed for a refugee camp, separated from their daughter in the middle of the fighting. As they leave, Mulcahy tells them to ask the officials at the refugee camp for help. A shipment of wounded arrives, and one of the medics advises Colonel Potter of a helicopter that was sent earlier that day with a sniper victim. Colonel Potter tells the medic that the helicopter never arrived, and orders Klinger to have it reported as MIA. The medic tells Potter and Klinger that they managed to capture the sniper and produce a young Korean woman named Soon-Lee Han, who was found with an M1 Carbine rifle in the fields and is suspected of being the sniper. Soon-Lee claims her innocence, saying that she found the rifle as she was ploughing. Klinger is ordered to lock up Soon-Lee until Army Intelligence can interrogate her.

As work on the time capsule continues, Houlihan grows increasingly frustrated with Hawkeye's suggestions and throws Hawkeye off the project. Undaunted, Hawkeye soldiers on with his own time capsule. Rizzo decides to carry out his revenge when he goes into the shower tent, where B.J. is enjoying a shower. Rizzo begins playing with the dummy grenade, and pretends to accidentally pull the pin. Fearing for his life, B.J. runs naked out of the shower tent. When B.J. learns that the grenade was a dummy and this was all a prank, he vows to get back at Rizzo.

When Father Mulcahy hears Soon-Lee's story, they all become convinced that the elderly Korean couple are Soon-Lee's parents. Soon-Lee urges Klinger to let her go, but Klinger cannot. The missing helicopter finally arrives with the sniper's victim. The pilot puts his delay down to engine trouble, and his radio silence to a damaged radio. The sniper's victim tells the real story to Hawkeye and Houlihan. The helicopter took enemy fire destroying the radio and the fan belt, forcing them to land. This left the helicopter only able fly a maximum of 200 yards before the engine overheated. The pilot walked ahead 200 yards to find a safe clearing to land, and by the time he returned to the chopper, the engine was cool and ready to fly again. He repeated this "walk, return, fly" process until it was too dark to fly, and then began the next morning as soon as it was light. Hawkeye and Houlihan are touched by the pilot's heroism.

While the sniper's victim is in surgery Klinger has B.J. extract the bullet, which is too big to have come from the rifle Soon-Lee had. Now that she's free, Klinger, Father Mulcahy, and Soon-Lee drive to the refugee camp to find her parents. When they arrive, they are met with heartbreak. They are not Soon-Lee's parents. Rizzo and Winchester have an argument in the mess tent, and Rizzo uses his grenade prank to get back at him. Winchester throws Rizzo to safety, and then uses his body to smother the grenade. Winchester takes the grenade and says he will dispose of it safely, much to Rizzo's chagrin. When Rizzo is gone, Winchester signals to B.J., showing that they planned it to get back at Rizzo for what he did to B.J.

Houlihan is holding a ceremony to bury her time capsule when Hawkeye, B.J., and Winchester arrive to bury their own. Hawkeye makes one last attempt to get some his items in Houlihan's capsule. First he offers the broken fan belt from the helicopter, saying that the pilot's heroism is something that deserves to be remembered in 100 years. Houlihan agrees, and takes the fan belt. Hawkeye then offers her Radar's teddy bear, saying it can stand for the soldiers who came as boys and went home as men. B.J. offers her a fishing lure that belonged to Henry Blake, to stand for those who never made it home. Father Mulcahy then offers her a pair of boxing gloves, saying that if countries in the future feel the need to go to war, they can use them to resolve their differences. Houlihan relents, and allows a bottle of cognac from Winchester (arguing that the cognac will have aged for over 100 years) and a little black dress from Klinger (dedicated to "all the women we left behind"). Hawkeye's time capsule is empty, with everything put into Houlihan's.

Winchester asks why nothing was added to remember Frank Burns. Hawkeye jokes about including Burns' scalpel, but "didn't want to include any deadly weapons" (Hawkeye has always thought Burns was a bad surgeon who killed patients). They meet up with Klinger and Soon-Lee, and all decide to go to the Officer's Club, which is packed full. Winchester says he believes a few tables will open up soon, as he pulls the dummy grenade from his pocket.

== Actual M*A*S*H time capsule ==
As this was the final episode filmed, the cast decided to take a cue from this episode and bury a real time capsule filled with props from the show. It was the hope of the cast that the time capsule would remain undisturbed for 100 years. However, they did not inform 20th Century Fox, and the company soon sold the property where the box was located, unaware of its existence. The time capsule was then dug up by a construction worker who took it home. The construction worker tried to return the time capsule to the cast, but Alan Alda told the worker to keep it.
