= John Rappaport (screenwriter) =

American producer and screenwriter

- Occupation(s): Producer, screenwriter

John Rappaport is an American producer and screenwriter. He was nominated for eight Primetime Emmy Awards. He wrote the series finale "Goodbye, Farewell and Amen" of the television series M*A*S*H, along with Alan Alda, Burt Metcalfe, Dan Wilcox, Thad Mumford, Elias Davis, David Pollock and Karen Hall.
