= Mount Ararat Baptist Church =

Church located in Stafford, Virginia, US

The Mount Church is a Baptist church located in Stafford, Virginia. Adam Sauer is the Lead Pastor of the church.

== Description ==
The Mount has frequently hosted events helpful to the local public, such as the Weekday Preschool Program, classes with Dave Ramsey's Financial Peace University, events where they've given clothes to people in need, and others.

== History ==
The Mount Church was founded in the fall of 1907 under the original name Mount Ararat Baptist Church. During that time, a few men banded together in an empty field and decided to establish a church. One of the men donated land, and together the men built a small building and a cemetery. During the early years of the church, the Baptist Church of Toluca, later renamed Mt Ararat Baptist Church only had part-time pastors. Because the quality of the roads were low, Sunday School only met from April to Christmas. In 1942, the U.S. Government bought extra land to enlarge the [Quantico Marine Base], and much growth began to take place within Mt. Ararat. Along with new members came the inevitable need for more space, and the original building was enlarged by adding an entrance and Sunday School classrooms. The first full-time pastor was called in 1953. This was an important event for Mt Ararat Baptist church; Soon after a full-time pastor was enlisted, a full schedule of Sunday morning, evening, and Wednesday evening services were held, and a choir was also established. Soon after this, the first parsonage was constructed, and the sanctuary was enlarged. Later in the 1970s, as long-distance communication became popular, housing development became more frequent surrounding the church area. Mt. Ararat responded to this by purchasing more land for recreation and parking, and adding a new Sunday School wing and a new parsonage. In the 1980s the church sanctuary was expanded. In the 1990s more space was needed to keep up with the pace at which new members were joining the church; new modular units were purchased to increase the space needed for Sunday school. The current pastor is Adam Sauer.

== Ministers/Pastors - Past/Present ==
- SENIOR PASTORS
- Rev. A.T. Lynn September 1907 - August 1909
- Rev. James E. Jett September 1909 - May 1933
- Rev. Lloyd B. Boutchyard June 1933 - July 1948
- Rev. Herbert Reamy August 1948 - August 1953 (interim)
- Rev. Allen Gaines September 1953 - August 1954
- Rev. Don Lytal September 1954 - May 1955
- Rev. William Engles May 1955 - January 1957
- Rev. Tommy Toms June 1957 - May 1962
- Jack A. Marcom, Jr. Several Months (interim)
- Rev. James B. Grimes July 1963 - March 1966
- Rev. Charles T. Fulbright August 1966 - January 1969
- Rev. Walter Dodd May 1969 - June 1970
- Rev. William L. Lively December 1970 - December 1976
- Rev. Charles Leonard January 1977 - September 1977
- Rev. Lester Curtis, Jr. September 1977 - May 1986
- Rev. Aubrey D. Whitten, Jr. February 1987 - August 2003
- Rev. Todd Gaston, February 2005 – (?) 2022
- Rev. Adam Sauer, 2022 - Present
- ASSOCIATE PASTORS OF MUSIC/CREATIVE ARTS
- Rev. David T. Hottel, Sr. September 1980 - October 1989
- Rev. Bruce Pafford August 1990 - May 1993
- Karen Hall May 1993 - January 1994 & June 1999 - March 2000 (Interim)
- Rev. Ken Nuss January 1994 - June 1999
- Rev. Bill Simpson April 2000 - November 2007
- Rev. Micah Watson November 2008 – 2010
- Pastor Andy LaValley 2011–Present
- ASSOCIATE PASTORS OF YOUTH/STUDENTS
- Rev. Arthur DeCourcey 1980 - 1985
- Rev. Matthew Sickling May 1989 - April 1990
- Rev. Darryl Mosley June 1991 - February 2002
- Rev. Todd Gaston August 2002 - January 2005
- Rev. Zac Ashley June 2005 – present
- ASSOCIATE PASTOR OF EDUCATION & CHURCH GROWTH/ADULT MINISTRIES
- Rev. Juan M. Rivera July 1996 - 2005
- Rev. Matthew McDonald June 2006 – present
- ASSOCIATE PASTOR OF CONNECTIONS/MINISTRY & MISSIONS
- Rev. Juan M. Rivera August 2005 – present
- ASSOCIATE PASTOR OF PASTORAL CARE
- Rev. Dick Harmon July 1997 - April 2005
- ASSOCIATE PASTOR OF CHILDREN'S & PRESCHOOL MINISTRY

Rev. Al Lawson April 1999 - September 2005

- MINISTER TO CHILDREN

Susan Harvey Wanderer June 2006 – present

- EXECUTIVE PASTOR
- Rev. Gregory Poss June 2000 – December 2014

== Beliefs and practices ==
- THE AUTHORITY OF THE BIBLE - The Bible is the inspired, infallible Word of God. It is our sole authority for discerning and putting into practice God's Will. The Bible is a perfect revelation from God which points us to the Living Word, Jesus Christ. God's Word is truth and leads men and women to salvation.
- GOD - There is one living and true God who reveals Himself to us in three persons: God the Father, God the Son, and God the Holy Spirit. This triune nature comprises one Supreme Being who is omnipotent, eternal, holy, and infinitely loving. To Him, we owe our highest obedience, reverence, and love.
- JESUS CHRIST - Jesus of Nazareth is the incarnation of Almighty God. The Bible says that "the Word became flesh and dwelt among us" (John 1:14). Jesus was completely God and completely man, miraculously born of a virgin. He is the earthly son of a heavenly Father and the heavenly son of an earthly mother. Jesus came to reveal God to mankind and to offer Himself as the perfect sacrifice for the sins of the world when He died on a cross. God raised Him from the dead on the third day in order to prove that Jesus was victorious over sin, death, and hell. After 40 days the risen Lord ascended into heaven, and He will come again in power and glory in order to bring this world to a triumphant conclusion.
- THE HOLY SPIRIT - The Holy Spirit is the active Presence of God in the world and in the hearts and lives of God's people. The spirit of God brings about conviction of sin and brings about regeneration, or a new birth, in the hearts and lives of believers. Also, the Holy Spirit empowers the Christian to live out his/her faith, provides assurance of salvation for the believer, and bestows upon the believer spiritual gifts for ministry.
- MANKIND - Mankind was created by God in His own image. This means that men and women have dominion over the earth, they have the ability to choose right from wrong, and they have the opportunity to relate to God and to one another. Because of their "free will" all people choose to sin against God and, therefore, are separated from God. People cannot overcome their sin on their own and be reconciled with God. Rather, they must totally depend upon the saving power of God. We are created in the image of Adam and Eve and have received their sin nature. Jesus is the "new Adam" who did not sin against God. It is through Him that we take on a new nature in which our sins are forgiven and cleansed.
- SALVATION - The Bible says, "all have sinned and fall short of the glory of God" (Romans 3:23). Also, the Bible says, "the wages of sin is death, but the gift of God is eternal life through Jesus Christ our Lord" (Romans 6:23). Sin separates us from God, and there is no way that we can get rid of all the sin in our life. There is nothing that we can do in order to overcome this terrible plight. Fortunately, God loves us, and He sent Jesus into the world in order to solve our sin problem for us. Because of His love for us, Jesus died on a cross, as a perfect sacrifice for our sins. The Bible tells how Jesus took our sins upon Himself; He took the punishment for our sins. Therefore, salvation (forgiveness of sin and a personal relationship with God) is a gift provided for everyone by God. However, we must receive that gift by placing our faith in Christ and surrendering to Jesus as Lord. Salvation is purely a gift of God's grace which we receive by faith. Then, we are reconciled with God and will live in heaven with Jesus for all eternity. Also, He will live with us in this life through the presence and power of the Holy Spirit.
- THE CHURCH - A New Testament church of the Lord Jesus is a local body of baptized believers who gather together in order to carry out the mission of Christ on earth. The purposes of the church are to build up believers in their faith through worship, Bible study and fellowship, and then to spread the Good News and the love of Christ throughout the world through evangelism, ministry, and missions. Every Christian is a minister, and every Christian has spiritual gifts to be used in the ministry of the church. The Biblical ordinances of the church are believer's baptism and the Lord's Supper. Baptism does not provide salvation but is a strong symbol of the salvation which has already been received by a person. That is why we insist upon baptism by immersion because this method symbolizes the death, burial, and resurrection of Christ. As a believer, we bury our old life with Christ and then we are raised to a new life with Him. Baptism by immersion is a wonderful way for the believer to share this symbolic testimony. The Lord's Supper is also a powerful symbol for the sacrifice of Christ and the salvation which He provides. This ordinance is a reminder to us of our fellowship with Christ and with one another. Church membership is an important way to share your commitment to Christ through a local body of believers. In joining Mount Ararat, a Christian is making a commitment to help us achieve the mission which God has given to us of making a difference for Christ in our community.
