= Goodbye, Farewell and Amen =

- M*A*S*H episode
- Episode no.: Season 11; Episode 16
- Directed by: Alan Alda
- Written by: Alan Alda; Burt Metcalfe; John Rappaport; Dan Wilcox; Thad Mumford; Elias Davis; David Pollock; Karen Hall
- Production code: 9-B04
- Original air date: February 28, 1983
- Running time: 2 hours

Guest appearances
- Allan Arbus as Major Sidney Freedman; G. W. Bailey as S/Sgt Luther Rizzo; Rosalind Chao as Soon-Lee Han; Kellye Nakahara as Nurse Kellye; Jeff Maxwell as Igor; John Shearin as The Chopper Pilot; Enid Kent as Nurse Bigelow; Blake Clark as 2nd MP

Episode chronology
← Previous "As Time Goes By"	Next → —
- M*A*S*H season 11

"Goodbye, Farewell and Amen" is a television film that served as the series finale of the American television series M*A*S*H. The 2½-hour episode first aired on CBS on February 28, 1983, ending the series' original run. The episode was written by eight collaborators, including series star Alan Alda, who also directed. As of 2026, it remains the most-watched single episode of any television series in U.S. history, and for twenty-seven years was the most-watched single broadcast in television history.

The episode's plot chronicles the final days of the Korean War at the 4077th MASH; it features several storylines intended to show the war's effects on the individual personnel of the unit and to bring closure to the series. After the ceasefire goes into effect, the members of the 4077th throw a party before taking down the camp for the last time. After tear-filled goodbyes, the main characters go their separate ways, leading to the final scene of the series.

== Plot ==
Hawkeye Pierce is being treated at a psychiatric hospital by Sidney Freedman following a PTSD-induced nervous breakdown in the operating room. He tells Freedman that when returning home from a beach outing with camp staff, their bus picked up some refugees and wounded soldiers. Forced to pull off the road to avoid an enemy patrol, Hawkeye remembers telling a refugee to keep her chicken quiet, causing her to smother it.

The 4077th is now home to large numbers of refugees and a prisoner of war cage. A wounded tank driver seeking medical aid demolishes the camp latrine and abandons the tank in the camp. Charles Winchester meets five Chinese soldiers on a motorcycle-sidecar combination eager to surrender. The men are musicians and Winchester marches them to camp while they play "Oh! Susanna". B.J. takes the motorcycle and Winchester teaches the prisoners classical music. Despite a language barrier, the musicians recognize Mozart's name and Winchester teaches them to play Mozart's Clarinet Quintet.

Margaret Houlihan is offered an Army administrative post while Winchester is passed over for a coveted chief surgeon spot in a hometown Boston hospital. When he receives an update confirming his appointment, he learns from Klinger that Margaret intervened in the selection process through an influential relative.

Klinger falls in love with refugee Soon-Lee Han, who is searching for her missing parents. B.J. Hunnicutt receives repatriation orders and prepares to leave once Colonel Potter can get a replacement surgeon. The chaos in the camp is intensified by enemy mortar fire on the abandoned tank. Father Mulcahy loses his hearing while saving POWs under fire in their holding area. He swears B.J. to secrecy about the nature of his injury, afraid the Army will return him home, away from the local orphans he has tended throughout his time in Korea.

With further treatment, Hawkeye realizes the woman on the bus had actually smothered her baby to prevent discovery by the enemy patrol. The chicken had been a false memory. He breaks down and lashes out at Sidney who explains it was necessary for his recovery. Hawkeye returns to duty to find B.J. flew out without a farewell, as his friend Trapper John had earlier in the series. When the mortar fire intensifies, Hawkeye impulsively drives the tank into a garbage dump to draw fire away from the camp. Renewed concerns about his mental health brings Sidney to camp to check on him.

A forest fire causes the camp to relocate. B.J. returns by helicopter, having been rerouted at Guam. He celebrates his daughter's birthday at a party for orphaned refugee children. Hawkeye avoids the celebration due to his experiences, and tells Sidney he fears always being reminded by children of his trauma. When Hawkeye finds he can operate on an injured young girl, Sidney leaves the 4077th with Hawkeye's thanks.

Winchester's musicians leave camp as part of a prisoner exchange, playing Mozart's Clarinet Quintet as they depart. The ceasefire is announced ending hostilities in the war. The 4077th returns to its former site with wounded soldiers continuing to arrive in the last hours of the war. Winchester is shocked to find one of the musicians among them, having died en route to the camp. Learning the others had been killed, Winchester smashes his recording of Mozart in anger.

The camp personnel throw a party and reveal their postwar plans. Hawkeye will return to practice in his hometown in Maine; B.J. will return to his family; Colonel Potter will retire to his wife Mildred; Houlihan will work in a military hospital; Winchester will become the head of thoracic surgery at Boston Mercy Hospital, though he admits he will never be able to enjoy music again due to his experiences; Mulcahy will leave the military to work with the deaf. Klinger will marry Soon-Lee and ironically, given his attempts throughout the series to be sent home, remain in Korea to help her search for her missing parents. Mulcahy officiates their wedding while the camp is dismantled. Winchester apologizes to Houlihan for his earlier poor treatment of her, and gives her a signed book of her favorite poetry. Houlihan says goodbye to Potter, B.J. and Winchester before Hawkeye steals a long kiss. Winchester then leaves in a garbage truck, saying “what better way to leave a garbage dump.” Potter takes a final ride on Sophie, the horse Radar gifted him earlier in the series, before donating her to the orphanage. Hawkeye and B.J. give him a final parting gift, a heartfelt salute, which Potter tearfully returns.

B.J. gives Hawkeye a ride to the chopper pad on the motorcycle and they reflect on their shared experience. Hawkeye boards the last helicopter out and B.J. promises to track Hawkeye down, but left a note in case they really do never see each other again. He rides away and Hawkeye struggles to understand, until the helicopter takes off and he sees the word GOODBYE spelled out with rocks. He smiles as the helicopter carries him away.

== Production ==
The script was written between April and September 16, 1982, with filming taking place in late September and early October. After a wildfire through Malibu Creek State Park on October 9 destroyed much of the set, two additional scenes were written to incorporate a fire into the story. Harry Morgan and Kellye Nakahara returned to the set on October 15 to film a short scene among the still smoldering ruins.

== Cultural reaction and impact ==
The anticipation before the airing of "Goodbye, Farewell and Amen" was unprecedented, especially for a regular television series (in contrast to awards shows, sporting events, or special events). Interest from advertisers prompted CBS, the network broadcasting M*A*S*H, to sell 30-second commercial blocks for $450,000 each (equivalent to $1.45 million in 2025) – costlier than during NBC's airing of the Super Bowl of that year.

On the night the episode aired, large areas of California (particularly the San Francisco Bay Area) suffered power outages due to unusually stormy winter weather, which prevented many viewers from watching the series finale.

=== Reaction and AfterMASH ===
In the United States, the episode drew 105.97 million total viewers and a total audience of 121.6 million, more than both Super Bowl XVII and the Roots miniseries. The episode surpassed the single-episode ratings record that had been set by the Dallas episode that resolved the "Who Shot J.R.?" cliffhanger. From 1983 until 2010, "Goodbye, Farewell and Amen" remained the most watched television broadcast in American history, passed only in total viewership (but not in ratings or share) in February 2010 by Super Bowl XLIV. As of 2026, it still stands as the most-watched single episode of any television series in U.S. history.

As M*A*S*H was one of the most successful shows in TV history, in order not to lose the franchise completely, CBS quickly created a new series, AfterMASH, that followed the postwar adventures of Colonel Potter, Max Klinger, and Father Mulcahy in a stateside veterans hospital. Despite wide popularity in its premiere episodes, script problems and constant character changes led to a sharp decline in viewers, and the show was canceled by CBS after only two seasons. Another would-be spin-off, W*A*L*T*E*R, was a pilot made in 1984 that was never picked up. It starred Gary Burghoff, who reprised his M*A*S*H character.

"Goodbye, Farewell and Amen" was not initially included in the syndication package for M*A*S*H's final season; however, in 1992, the episode made its syndication premiere in time for its 10th anniversary. Local stations aired it as a part of a Movie of the Week.

== See also ==
- List of most watched television broadcasts in the United States
