= Revolting People =

BBC radio sitcom

- CD cover of the first series
- Other names: Tollers
- Genre: Historical sitcom
- Running time: 30 minutes
- Country of origin: United Kingdom
- Language: English
- Home station: BBC Radio 4
- Starring: Andy Hamilton; Jay Tarses; James Fleet; Hugh Dennis; Tony Maudsley; Sophie Thompson (Series 1); Jan Ravens (Series 2-3); Julia Hills (Series 4); Felicity Montagu (Series 1); Penelope Nice (Series 2-3); Susie Blake
- Created by: Andy Hamilton; Jay Tarses
- Written by: Andy Hamilton; Jay Tarses
- Produced by: Paul Mayhew-Archer
- Original release: 18 January 2000 – 6 June 2006
- No. of series: 4 (up to 2006)
- No. of episodes: 24 (up to 2006)
- Website: Official website

Revolting People is a BBC Radio 4 situation comedy set in colonial Baltimore, Maryland, just before and during the American Revolutionary War. The series is written by the Briton Andy Hamilton and the American Jay Tarses, with Tarses playing a sour shopkeeper named Samuel Oliphant and Hamilton playing a cheerfully corrupt, one-legged, one-eyed, one-armed, one-eared one-nostrilled British soldier, Sergeant Roy McGurk, billeted on him.

Samuel's children are Mary, who is in love with McGurk's prim commanding officer Captain Brimshaw while at the same time operating as a notorious anti-British pamphleteer under the pseudonym Spartacus; Cora, in an unconsummated marriage with the pompous pro-British Loyalist official Ezekiel but nevertheless a mother; and the dimwitted Joshua, whose favourite recreation is wrestling bears.

Series 1 and 2 were released on CD in 2007–8. Repeats on the series now play on BBC Radio 4 Extra (formerly BBC Radio 7).

== Cast ==
- Andy Hamilton – Sergeant Roy McGurk
- Jay Tarses – Samuel Oliphant
- Sophie Thompson / Jan Ravens / Julia Hills – Mary Oliphant
- James Fleet – Captain Brimshaw
- Hugh Dennis – Ezekiel Spriggs
- Felicity Montagu / Penelope Nice – Cora Spriggs (née Oliphant)
- Tony Maudsley – Joshua
- Susie Blake – Mrs. Arbuthnot (Series 1)/Elizabeth Oliphant (Series 2)

Additional roles played by Philip Pope, Michael Fenton Stevens, Rebecca Front and the cast. Series 1 had guest appearances by William Hootkins as Samuel's brother Dan, and Timothy West as General Venables. Produced by Paul Mayhew-Archer

== Episode list ==
=== Series 1 (2000) ===
Originally ran in 2000. Revolved around the imposition of martial law in Baltimore and the springing up of a torrid, though also chaste, love affair between Oliphant's daughter Mary and an officer of the local British garrison, Captain Brimshaw. The show starts on 5 March 1770, the day of the Boston Massacre.

1. 18 January – Storm Clouds
2. 25 January – More Storm Clouds
3. 1 February – Even More Storm Clouds
4. 8 February – Tons of Storm Clouds
5. 15 February – A Helluva Lot of Storm Clouds
6. 22 February – An Incredible Amount of Storm Clouds

This series was released on CD on 3 September 2007.

=== Series 2 (2001) ===
Originally ran in 2001. Less continuous than series 1 but developed the same theme with the added introduction of Oliphant's long-departed wife reappearing as a lesbian (to McGurk's lecherous satisfaction).

1. 24 April – Trying Times
2. 1 May – Even More Trying Times
3. 8 May – Some More Trying Times
4. 15 May – And Yet Even More Trying Times
5. 22 May – A Bunch More Trying Times
6. 29 May – Still in Trying Times

This series was released on CD on 7 January 2008.

=== Series 3 (2004) ===
The third series originally ran in 2004 and consisted of stand-alone episodes parodying various classic films with a final episode that turned the series on its head.

1. 27 May – Young Love
2. 3 June – A Kiss is Just a Kiss (parodying Casablanca)
3. 10 June – The God-Given Talent
4. 17 June – Over the Rainbow (parodying The Wizard of Oz)
5. 24 June – Them Thar Hills (parodying gold rush westerns)
6. 1 July – Secrets And Lies

=== Series 4 (2006) ===
First broadcast in 2006, and repeated from 31 March 2007. The events of the final episode of the previous series are explained as having been a dream.

1. 2 May – Ezekiel is Kidnapped – Samuel's pompous son-in-law, Ezekiel, is kidnapped by a rebel militia
2. 9 May – McGurk Runs the Shop – Samuel goes in search of his sister, Belle.
3. 16 May – George Washington – Samuel realises he's in the middle of a war when half his shop is burnt down by rebelling colonists and the other half by the British
4. 23 May – Pirates – Samuel, McGurk and the others flee to England
5. 30 May – Reunion – Samuel, McGurk and the others arrive in London
6. 6 June – The King – Samuel, McGurk and the others finally meet King George III
