= The Duck Factory =

Television sitcom

- Created by: Allan Burns; Herbert Klynn
- Starring: Jim Carrey; Teresa Ganzel; Jay Tarses; Don Messick; Clarence Gilyard Jr; Julie Payne; Jack Gilford
- Opening theme: "Sure Beats Working for a Living" performed by Mark Vieha
- Composer: Tom Wells
- Country of origin: United States
- Original language: English
- No. of seasons: 1
- No. of episodes: 13

Production
- Executive producer: Allan Burns
- Running time: 30 minutes
- Production company: MTM Productions

Original release
- Network: NBC
- Release: April 12 – July 11, 1984

Related
- The Dippy Duck Show

The Duck Factory is an American sitcom produced by MTM Enterprises that aired on NBC from April 12 until July 11, 1984. It was Jim Carrey's first lead role in a Hollywood production. It was also the only time Don Messick, famously the voice of Scooby-Doo, appeared in a live-action role, although he also voiced a cartoon character within the sitcom as well. The show was set at a small independent animation studio, and was co-created by Allan Burns and Herbert Klynn. The series won two Emmy Awards in technical categories, for its title sequence and art direction.

== Background ==
Burns had started his career as a writer/animator for The Rocky and Bullwinkle Show and George of the Jungle before turning to live action and co-creating The Mary Tyler Moore Show; Klynn had worked in various production capacities on Mr. Magoo and Gerald McBoing-Boing, amongst many other cartoons.

== Overview ==
The premiere episode introduces Skip Tarkenton (Carrey), a somewhat naive and optimistic young man who has come to Hollywood looking for a job as a cartoonist. When he arrives at a low-budget animation company called Buddy Winkler Productions, he finds out Buddy Winkler has just died, and the company desperately needs new blood. So Skip gets an animation job at the firm, which is nicknamed "The Duck Factory" as their main cartoon is "The Dippy Duck Show".

Other Duck Factory employees seen regularly on the show were man-of-a-thousand-cartoon voices Wally Wooster (played by real-life cartoon voice artist Don Messick); cynical, sometimes lazy comedy writer Marty Fenneman (played by real-life comedy writer Jay Tarses); veteran artist and animator Brooks Carmichael (Jack Gilford); younger storyboard artist Roland Culp (Clarence Gilyard); sarcastic editor Andrea Lewin; and hard-nosed, penny-pinching business manager Aggie Aylesworth. Buddy Winkler Productions was now owned by Buddy's young, ditzy but good-hearted widow, Mrs. Sheree Winkler (Teresa Ganzel), a former topless ice dancer who had been married to Buddy for all of three weeks before his death.

== Production ==
Seen in some episodes were clips from various "Dippy Duck" cartoons the Buddy Winkler crew were working on—sometimes fully animated, sometimes in pencil sketch or animatic form. The opening and closing credits were also animated. Series co-creator Klynn was also credited as the show's "creative animation consultant", while production of the actual animated material was done by Ted and Gerry Woolery for which each won an Emmy.

== Show history ==
The Duck Factory lasted thirteen episodes; it premiered April 12, 1984. It was directed primarily by Gene Reynolds, Rod Daniel, and Victor Lobl, who each did three episodes. The show initially aired at 9:30 on Thursday nights, directly after Cheers (at the time, not yet a top ten hit; Cheers finished the 1983/84 television season in 34th place). The show replaced Buffalo Bill on NBC's schedule. Jay Tarses, an actor on The Duck Factory, had been the co-creator and executive producer of Buffalo Bill, which had its final network telecast on Thursday, April 5, 1984.

=== Episode ordering ===
NBC broadcast The Duck Factory episodes out of the producers' intended order. This led to significant continuity issues with the series, rendering certain plot developments almost incomprehensible.

Most notably, episode 1 ended on a series of cliffhangers that were then apparently left unresolved, as the intended episode that would have resolved them wasn't shown. Instead, the eighth episode in the intended order (in which Skip is promoted to being the producer of "The Dippy Duck Show", much to the resentment of the show's staff) was shown as episode 2.

Later episodes were also shown wildly out of order, meaning that as broadcast, succeeding episodes ping-ponged between Skip being the show's producer, and Skip being the show's low-ranking apprentice animator, with no explanation as to the reason for his constant change of status. As well, amongst other baffling developments, Mrs. Winkler was the company's receptionist in second episode as broadcast—but then in the fourth episode she becomes the receptionist. Finally, what the producers had intended to air as the second episode (and which set up the continuing premise of the series) was shown as the thirteenth and final episode. Unfortunately, the plot developments of this episode and the character relationships made absolutely no sense in the context of what had already transpired in episodes 2-12 (as broadcast).

The show changed timeslots in June, moving to Wednesdays at 9:30. The last original episode of The Duck Factory was broadcast on July 11, 1984.

=== Reception ===
Critical reaction to the show was mixed, ranging from strong positive reviews through lukewarm praise to outright pans. Tom Shales of The Washington Post was one of the most positive reviewers, writing that the show "seems possessed of true mirth, a rare quality on television", and Lee Winfrey of the Philadelphia Inquirer urged readers: "Try it. This is a fresh and invigorating comedy that deserves double its present audience." A less positive review came from Bill Carter of The Baltimore Sun, who noted: "The Duck Factory has too much talent not to be considered a show of potential promise, but after its first exposure tonight the best that can be said is that it's still a show of promise." On the lowest end of the scale, Arthur Unger of The Christian Science Monitor wrote: "I find the best things about it are the premise, the title - and the titles. The show itself is slightly distasteful, vaguely charming, frighteningly slight, and sadly unfunny."

Many reviewers focused on the series lead, the then largely unknown Jim Carrey, singling him out for praise even if they were less enthusiastic about the show itself.

== Cast ==
- Jim Carrey as Skip Tarkenton
- Jack Gilford as Brooks Carmichael
- Nancy Lane as Andrea Lewin
- Jay Tarses as Marty Fenneman
- Don Messick as Wally Wooster
  - Messick also voiced Dippy Duck
- Julie Payne as Aggie Aylesworth
- Clarence Gilyard Jr as Roland Culp
- Teresa Ganzel as Mrs. Sheree Winkler

== Episodes ==
No.	Title	Directed by	Written by	Original release date	Prod. code
1	"Goodbye Buddy, Hello Skip"	Gene Reynolds	Allan Burns	April 12, 1984	3601
Skip Tarkenton finds his dream of becoming an animator coming true a lot sooner than he expected when he arrives in L.A.
2	"Filling Buddy's Shoes"	Rod Daniel	John Steven Owen	April 19, 1984	3608
Someone must fill Buddy's shoes as the Dippy Duck showrunner. But who? (NOTE: This episode aired significantly out of the producers' intended running order. This left the cliffhanger ending of episode 1 apparently unresolved, and created numerous plot inconsistencies going forward. The episode shot and actually intended as episode 2, "Call Me Responsible", was inexplicably aired as episode 13.)
3	"The Annies"	Victor Lobl	Barbara Hall	April 26, 1984	3604
A series of mishaps arise when the staff attend the Annies, where Buddy is to receive a posthumous award. Special guest star: Frank Bonner
4	"No Good Deed"	Harry Winer	Steve Kline	May 3, 1984	3605
Skip learns that no good deed goes unpunished when he gives Ginger a job she doesn't deserve and Marty's script a kinder review than it deserves.
5	"The Way We Weren't"	Victor Lobl	Katherine Green	May 10, 1984	3610
Aggie plans to attend a reunion with her old Navy pals, but when she can't scrounge a date, she asks Skip to accompany her. Barry Corbin guest starred.
6	"Can We Talk?"	Peter Baldwin	John Steven Owen	May 17, 1984	3611
Marty's plagiarism becomes Skip's problem.
7	"The Education of Mrs. Winkler" "The Education of S*h*e*r*e*e W*i*n*k*l*e*r"	Rod Daniel	Jordan Moffet	May 24, 1984	3609
In hopes of being smarter, Sheree decides to finally get her high school diploma, and Brooks gives her a helping hand — and a little something extra.
8	"Ordinary People, Too"	Kim Friedman	Bob Stevens	June 6, 1984	3607
Skip helps come up with the cash to fund Andrea's film project, yet doesn't get the thanks one might think.
9	"It Didn't Happen One Night"	Burt Brinckerhoff	Jordan Moffet	June 13, 1984	3613
The gang begin to suspect that Skip and Andrea are romantically involved. Meanwhile, Marty isn't happy about his friend's new girlfriend — Sheree.
10	"The Duck Stops Here"	Victor Lobl	John Steven Owen	June 20, 1984	3603
Wally decides to throw his hat into the Shakespeare ring after his Dippy Duck voice escapes him. Frank Welker guest stars as a rival voice actor for Dippy Duck; ironically both Messick and Welker were voice actors for The Scooby-Doo cartoon show.
11	"The Children's Half-Hour"	Rod Daniel	Thad Mumford & Dan Wilcox	June 27, 1984	3612
It's Children's Night at the Apollo when Brooks' son and Wally's daughter both want to further their artistic careers — to the joy of Brooks and the dismay of Wally.
12	"You Always Love the One You Hurt"	Jim Drake	Thad Mumford & Dan Wilcox	July 4, 1984	3606
Roland is pressured to quit the animation business and follow in his father's footsteps — as a dentist. Meanwhile, the staff consider changing the show when a parents group vote it one of the most violent kids' programs on TV.
13	"Call Me Responsible"	Gene Reynolds	Stuart Silverman	July 11, 1984	3602
The ball is in Skip's hands when the show needs someone to fight for it at the network, or it will be cancelled. (NOTE: This was filmed as the second episode -- it follows on directly from episode 1, essentially resolves the numerous cliffhangers from that episode, and establishes the new direction of "The Dippy Duck Show". It is unknown why NBC showed it so drastically out of order.)

== US television ratings ==
Season	Episodes	Start date	End date	Nielsen rank	Nielsen rating
1983-84	13	April 12, 1984	July 11, 1984	64	13.8

== Home media ==
In 1995, at the height of Carrey's career, some episodes of the series were released in the United States on two VHS videocassettes by MTM Home Video. One tape contained the first three episodes, and the other, the final three. These two volumes were released in the United Kingdom in 1997, slightly expanded so that the first four episodes were on one tape and the last four (which had never been broadcast in the UK) were on the other.
