= Black Tie Affair (TV series) =

- Created by: Jay Tarses
- Starring: Kate Capshaw; Bradley Whitford
- Country of origin: United States
- Original language: English
- No. of seasons: 1
- No. of episodes: 13 (8 unaired)

Production
- Production companies: Brillstein-Grey Entertainment; Columbia Pictures Television

Original release
- Network: NBC
- Release: May 29 – June 19, 1993

Black Tie Affair is an American crime drama spoof from Jay Tarses that aired on NBC from May 29 until June 19, 1993. During production, the series was known as Smoldering Lust.

== Premise ==
A send-up of 1940s detective noir, the series centers on a private eye, who is also a record store owner, as he investigates a philandering tycoon in San Francisco.

== Cast ==
- Bradley Whitford as Dave Brodsky
- Kate Capshaw as Margo Cody
- John Calvin as Christopher Cody
- Bruce McGill as Hal Kempner
- Alison Elliott as Eve Saskatchewan

== Episodes ==
No.	Title	Directed by	Written by	Original release date
1	"One"	Jay Tarses	Jay Tarses	May 29, 1993
2	"Two"	Jay Tarses	Jay Tarses	May 29, 1993
Christopher forgets his glasses at a crime scene.
3	"Three"	Jay Tarses	Richard Dresser	June 5, 1993
4	"Four"	Lesli Linka Glatter	Russ Woody	June 12, 1993
5	"Five"	Unknown	Unknown	June 19, 1993
6	"Six"	TBD	TBD	Unaired
7	"Seven"	TBD	TBD	Unaired
8	"Eight"	TBD	TBD	Unaired
9	"Nine"	TBD	TBD	Unaired
10	"Ten"	TBD	TBD	Unaired
11	"Eleven"	TBD	TBD	Unaired
12	"Twelve"	TBD	TBD	Unaired
13	"Thirteen"	TBD	TBD	Unaired

== Reception ==
Julio Martinez of Variety praised the series for having "a top-notch ensemble", but criticized it for not having "enough character substance and plot development to sustain one's interest in what's to follow". Lisa Schwarzbaum of Entertainment Weekly was more negative on the series, criticizing "the show's lack of smolder, lack of lustiness, and lack of ability to carry off the affectionate parody of the pulp-novel genre".

In 1994, a book authored by Vance Muse titled We Bombed in Burbank: A Joyride to Prime Time was published detailing the production of Black Tie Affair.
