= Crazy People =

- Theatrical release poster
- Directed by: Tony Bill; Barry L. Young (commercials)
- Written by: Mitch Markowitz
- Produced by: Thomas Brand; Robert K. Weiss
- Starring: Dudley Moore; Daryl Hannah; Paul Reiser
- Cinematography: Victor J. Kemper
- Edited by: Mia Goldman
- Music by: Cliff Eidelman
- Distributed by: Paramount Pictures
- Release date: April 13, 1990 (U.S.)
- Running time: 91 minutes
- Country: United States
- Language: English
- Box office: $13.2 million

Crazy People is a 1990 American black comedy film starring Dudley Moore and Daryl Hannah, directed by Tony Bill, and music by Cliff Eidelman.

== Plot ==
Emory Leeson is an advertising executive who experiences a nervous breakdown. He designs a series of "truthful" advertisements, blunt and bawdy and of no use to his boss Drucker's firm.

One of his colleagues, Stephen Bachman, checks him into a psychiatric hospital. Emory goes into group therapy under the care of Dr. Liz Baylor and meets other voluntary patients, such as the lovely and vulnerable Kathy Burgess. There is also George, who can speak only one word: "Hello."

By mistake, Emory's advertisements get printed and the new campaign turns out to be a tremendous success. Campaigns like: "Jaguar — For men who'd like hand jobs from beautiful women they hardly know." and "Volvo — they're boxy but they're good."

Drucker grabs credit for the ads. He assigns Stephen and the rest of his employees to design similar new ad campaigns featuring so-called honesty in advertising, but nothing works.

Emory is approached in the sanitarium about creating new ads himself. He insists that his fellow mental patients also be involved and suitably rewarded for their work, transforming the sanitarium into a branch of the advertising industry.

They come up with wild advertising slogans, like one for a Greek travel agency that goes: "Forget Paris. The French can be annoying. Come to Greece. We're nicer." And another one called "Come... IN the Bahamas" for the islands' national tourism board.

The patients experience happiness at being needed and improve from their various illnesses, including George, who begins to speak. Drucker and the doctor in charge of the hospital get greedy and try to separate the team, but it doesn't work. Dr. Baylor defies her boss and Emory negotiates to get new automobiles for all of the patients. Emory and Kathy, who have fallen in love, leave the hospital in an army helicopter piloted by Kathy's long-lost brother, stopping to take the rest of the patients with them. They then open their own advertising agency, with Sony ("Sony - Because Caucasians are just too damn tall") as their first client.

== Cast ==
- Dudley Moore as Emory Leeson
- Daryl Hannah as Kathy Burgess
- Paul Reiser as Stephen Bachman
- J. T. Walsh as Drucker
- Mercedes Ruehl as Dr. Baylor
- Alan North as Judge
- David Paymer as George
- Bill Smitrovich as Bruce
- Danton Stone as Saabs
- Paul Bates as Robles
- Dick Cusack as Mort
- Doug Yasuda as Hsu
- Floyd Vivino as Eddie Aris
- Ben Hammer as Dr. Koch
- David Packer as Mark Olander

== Production ==
Mitch Markowitz was the initial director, but was fired 3 days into production and replaced by Tony Bill. John Malkovich was originally cast as Emory until he left during production. The movie's uncredited producer Sydney Pollack replaced Malkovich with Dudley Moore.

The film features the track "Hello Song", performed by Floyd Vivino.

== Reception ==
Crazy People received mostly negative reviews and has a rating of 35% on Rotten Tomatoes based on 20 reviews. Roger Ebert envisioned a call from the fictional Movie Police in his review:

"Excuse me, sir. Movie Police here. Do you have a love story in this movie?" "Uh, afraid not. There's no need for one." "But who is the female lead?" "There isn't any." "And the heart-warming romantic conclusion?" "Are you kidding? This is a cynical satire about advertising." "And do you have a lot of lovable, huggable goofballs in supporting roles?" "Only the usual demented creative types who work in any ad agency." "Then I'm afraid you'll have to come down to the studio with us. What you've done is against . . . Movie Law!" Why do I get the feeling a scene like this was played at some point early in the history of "Crazy People"? Because the two halves of the movie fit together so uneasily.

Owen Gleiberman awarded the film a D− grade in one of Entertainment Weekly's earliest reviews, stating "All told, the film is less a diatribe against advertising than an unintentional celebration of it."

== Home media ==
The movie was released on VHS and Laserdisc (now out of print) in late 1990, and on widescreen DVD in 2004. It was released on Blu-ray by Shout! Factory on March 21, 2023.
