= Connie Izay =

American nurse (1928–1982)

- Connie Ruscetti, later Izay, from the 1947 yearbook of Hopewell High School in Pennsylvania
- Born: Constance Blanche Ruscetti; November 29, 1928; Aliquippa, Pennsylvania
- Died: August 21, 1982 (aged 53); Los Angeles, California
- Occupations: Nurse, actress, technical advisor
- Known for: Work on medical television programs, including M*A*S*H and Marcus Welby M.D.
- Spouse: Victor Izay

Constance "Connie" Ruscetti Izay (November 29, 1928 – August 21, 1982) was an American nurse, actress, and technical advisor on television programs, including M*A*S*H and Marcus Welby, M.D.

== Early life and education ==
Constance Blanche Ruscetti was born in Aliquippa, Pennsylvania, the daughter of Joseph Ruscetti and Rose Palazzi Ruscetti. She graduated from Hopewell High School in Aliquippa in 1947, and trained as a nurse at Sewickley Valley Hospital. In her twenties, she moved to Albuquerque with her parents.

== Career ==
Izay was a registered nurse. She worked as a nurse educator in the Virgin Islands for two years, and was employed at the Lovelace Clinic in New Mexico, where she helped with medical testing for the first American astronauts.

Izay was also active in community theater in Albuquerque. She married a theatre director, and moved to Los Angeles with him. She sometimes worked as a studio nurse, and sometimes played nurses in medical television programs. She was "Nurse Connie" in three episodes of M*A*S*H, and played a nurse in Man from Atlantis and Marcus Welby, M.D. "Though she's never seen a shrapnel wound in her life, Izay is now regularly called upon to bandage simulated war wounds on the Korean front," noted a 1980 profile. She was also a medical technical advisor on several television shows, especially Marcus Welby and M*A*S*H, but also an episode of Bonanza that involved a kitchen-table surgery to remove a bullet. She was "on the set at all times", read scripts for medical errors, highlighted terminology actors might need help to pronounce correctly, and showed actors how to hold medical equipment.

Beyond the technical aspects of her work, she tried to improve how nurses were portrayed on television. "I recall many a day when she'd come home elated because she and Loretta (Swit) had instigated change in the image that the nurses would present in the series," recalled her husband in 1983.

== Personal life and legacy ==
Ruscetti married actor Victor Izay in 1955. They had three children, Gregory, Victoria, and Stephen. She died from breast cancer in 1982, in Los Angeles, at the age of 53. The 1983 M*A*S*H episode "As Time Goes By", the last episode filmed for the series, and the second-to-last episode aired, was dedicated to her memory.
