= Dan Wilcox =

American producer and screenwriter (1941–2024)

- Born: April 17, 1941; New York City, U.S.
- Died: February 14, 2024 (aged 82); Los Angeles, California, U.S.
- Occupations: Producer, screenwriter
- Spouse: Leslie Easterbrook

Daniel Harris Wilcox (April 17, 1941 – February 14, 2024) was an American television producer and screenwriter. He won one and was nominated for four more Primetime Emmy Awards.

Wilcox wrote for television programs including Sesame Street, Good Times, Alice, M*A*S*H, Newhart, Growing Pains, Murder, She Wrote, Diagnosis: Murder, Cosby, and Becker. He notably co-wrote the series finale "Goodbye, Farewell and Amen" of the television series M*A*S*H, along with Alan Alda, Burt Metcalfe, John Rappaport, Thad Mumford, Elias Davis, David Pollock and Karen Hall.

In 2017, Wilcox was awarded the Morgan Cox Award from the Writers Guild of America West.

Wilcox died at Cedars-Sinai Medical Center on February 14, 2024, at the age of 82.
