= Jay Tarses =

American screenwriter, producer, actor

- Born: July 3, 1939 (age 87); Baltimore, Maryland, U.S.
- Education: Williams College
- Occupations: Actor, producer, screenwriter
- Years active: 1971–present
- Spouse: Rachel Tarses
- Children: 3; Including Jamie

Michael Jay Tarses (born July 3, 1939) is an American screenwriter, producer and actor. He created and produced The Days and Nights of Molly Dodd and The Slap Maxwell Story, co-created Buffalo Bill (with Tom Patchett), and was an executive producer for The Bob Newhart Show.

Tarses was born in Baltimore, Maryland. He graduated from Williams College in 1961. He was co-creator and co-writer (with Andy Hamilton) of BBC Radio 4's situation comedy Revolting People, which was set in colonial-era Baltimore; he played the role of sour shopkeeper Samuel Oliphant to Hamilton's cheerfully corrupt British soldier Sergeant McGurk. His most notable acting role was as Coach Bobby Finstock in the 1980s teen comedy Teen Wolf (1985). He also co-starred with Jim Carrey on the sitcom The Duck Factory in 1984. In 1990, he received an exclusive deal with NBC.

== Personal life ==
Tarses and his wife, Rachel, have three children: TV executive Jamie Tarses (1964–2021); TV writer Matt Tarses; and teacher and writer Mallory Tarses. An emergency exit at MassMoCA is named in honor of Tarses and his wife.

== Selected filmography ==
- The Bob Newhart Show (1972–1976, TV)
- The Carol Burnett Show (1972–1978, TV)
- The Tony Randall Show (1976–1978, TV, Co-creator, with Tom Patchett)
- The Chopped Liver Brothers ( 1977, TV movie with Tom Patchett)
- We've Got Each Other (1977–1978, TV)
- Mary (1978, TV)
- Up the Academy (1980, feature film, with Tom Patchett)
- The Great Muppet Caper (1981, feature film, with Tom Patchett, Jerry Juhl and Jack Rose)
- Open All Night (1981–1982, TV, Creator)
- Buffalo Bill (1983–1984, TV, Co-creator, with Tom Patchett)
- The Muppets Take Manhattan (1984, feature film with Tom Patchett and Frank Oz)
- The Slap Maxwell Story (1987–1988, TV, Creator)
- The Days and Nights of Molly Dodd (1987–1991, TV, Creator)
- Black Tie Affair (1993, TV)
- Public Morals (1996, TV, Co-creator, with Steven Bochco)

== Radio ==
- Revolting People (2000) (BBC, Co-Creator, with Andy Hamilton)
