= Jeff Maxwell =

American film and television actor

- Born: 1947 (age 78–79)
- Occupations: Film and television actor
- Spouse: Sherie Maxwell

Jeff Maxwell (born 1947) is an American film and television actor and comedian. He is best known for playing Pvt. Igor Straminsky, a recurring character in the American war comedy drama television series M*A*S*H. Initially hired as an extra during the first season, but was quickly hired as Alan Alda's stand in after the original stand in was fired. He remained in this role for the remainder of the series until its end in 1983. He appeared in 83 episodes, including the series finale Goodbye, Farewell and Amen.

In 1967, Maxwell printed screenplays as a teenager. His film debut was in the 1974 Mel Brooks comedy film Young Frankenstein. He played one of the title character's medical students. He was also featured in the 1977 sketch comedy film Kentucky Fried Movie in a solo scene titled "Feel-A-Round." His television roles include guest appearances on television series such as ABC's Eight is Enough, CBS's The Waltons and House Calls and NBC's CHiPs. He also hosted the short-lived game show Shopper's Casino in the 1987–88 season. In 1997, his cookbook, inspired by years of playing a mess hall cook on M*A*S*H, titled Secrets of the M*A*S*H Mess: The Lost Recipes of Private Igor, was published and he made an appearance on NBC's Today Show to promote it.

Maxwell was a regular participant on the alt.tv.mash newsgroup where, along with series writer Larry Gelbart (up until Gelbart's death in 2009), answers fan questions about the behind-the-scenes workings of M*A*S*H. Before he began his acting career on M*A*S*H, Maxwell was one-half of a comedy team called "Garrett & Maxwell." They performed at clubs throughout the United States for seven years before parting ways. Maxwell (according to journalist Peter Palmiere) has been working on a video documentary about female judges and referees in the sport of boxing. Since September 2018, Maxwell has served as a host for the M*A*S*H podcast M*A*S*H Matters, alongside co-host Ryan Patrick.

== Filmography ==
=== Film ===
- Young Frankenstein (1974, as Medical Student)
- Kentucky Fried Movie (1977, as Movie Goer in segment "Feel-a-Round")
- Divorce: The Musical (2001, as Harvey)

=== Television ===
- M*A*S*H (1973-1983, 83 episodes, as Igor Straminsky)
- Eight is Enough (1977-1981, 4 episodes, as various characters)
- The Waltons (1977, 1 episode, as Used Car Salesman)
- CHiPs (1979, 1 episode, as Motorist)
