= Buffalo Bill (TV series) =

American television series (1983-1984)

- Created by: Tom Patchett; Jay Tarses
- Starring: Dabney Coleman; Joanna Cassidy; Max Wright; John Fiedler; Geena Davis; Charlie Robinson; Meshach Taylor
- Composer: Tom Wells
- Country of origin: United States
- Original language: English
- No. of seasons: 2
- No. of episodes: 26 (1 unaired)

Production
- Executive producers: Tom Patchett; Jay Tarses; Bernie Brillstein
- Producers: Dennis Klein; Carol Gary
- Running time: 30 minutes
- Production company: Stampede Productions

Original release
- Network: NBC
- Release: June 1, 1983 – March 29, 1984

Buffalo Bill is an American sitcom television series that featured the misadventures of an egotistical talk show host, played by Dabney Coleman, and his staff (including Geena Davis and Joanna Cassidy) at WBFL-TV, a small TV station in Buffalo, New York. It premiered June 1, 1983, on NBC and ran for two seasons (1983–84). It was also shown on the then-new UK fourth TV channel Channel 4.

== Characters ==
- Dabney Coleman as "Buffalo" Bill Bittinger, raging egocentric local talk show host
- Joanna Cassidy as Joanna "Jo-Jo" White, no-nonsense producer of the talk show, in an on-again, off-again relationship with Bill
- Max Wright as Karl Shub, WBFL's station manager who suffers from an inability to inhibit Bill's bad behavior
- John Fiedler as Woodrow "Woody" Deschler, stage manager who is independently wealthy yet seems to enjoy working for Bill
- Geena Davis as Wendy Killian, a diligent but naive production assistant
- Charlie Robinson as Newdell Springs, make-up artist who is trying to move up the ladder
- Meshach Taylor as Tony, assistant director
- Claude Earl Jones as Stan (recurring), a stagehand whose name Bill struggles to remember
- Pippa Peartree as Melanie Bittinger, Bill's (estranged) daughter who is desperate for his approval and begins working at the station.

== Synopsis ==
Most of the humor came from Bill's completely irredeemable qualities and from the staff's frustration at dealing with him.

== US television ratings ==
Season	Episodes	Start date	End date	Nielsen rank	Nielsen rating
1982-83	12	June 1, 1983	August 17, 1983	N/A	N/A
1983-84	14	December 22, 1983	March 29, 1984	72	12.9

== Episodes ==
In 2005, Lionsgate (under license from Brillstein/Grey Communications) released the entire series on Region 1. In season 2 episode 1 — "Hit the Road, Newdell" — The "Hit the Road Jack" (lip synced to the Ray Charles song) sequence has been omitted from the DVD. It has been speculated that the scene was cut due to licensing problems.

=== Season 1: 1983 ===
No. overall	No. in season	Title	Directed by	Written by	Original release date
1	1	"Pilot"	Tom Patchett	Tom Patchett & Jay Tarses	June 1, 1983
When his best friend Pete Killian, of 60 Minutes, dies, Bill Bittinger, the egocentric talk show host of high-rated local show Buffalo Bill, immediately applies to 60 Minutes as a replacement news anchor. While Bill makes absurd pledges to Dan Thornwell, it is obvious to anyone but Bill that director Jo-Jo White and the CBS network executive, Dan Thornwell, are attracted. Bill later blunders into Joanna's apartment, picking up where he thinks he left off, even though Joanna has changed the lock on her door and told him not to drop by without calling first. Even when Thornwell appears at the door for their date, it takes Bill a few minutes to realize that Joanna and Dan are on a pre-arranged date, though he still tries to turn it to his advantage. After turning down an apparent contract offer from Carl, he receives a phone call from CBS. When he tells the live audience that he has elected to stay in Buffalo for his talk show, Jo-Jo opines to the crew that Bill obviously was not offered 60 Minutes. Bill refuses an order from Carl to hire a new research assistant until he meets and subsequently hires the late Pete Killian's beautiful and intelligent daughter, Wendy.
2	2	"Buffalo Beat"	Tom Patchett	Tom Patchett & Jay Tarses	June 8, 1983
After his bad interview with female chef Theresa Gallardo (Elsa Raven), Bill is given a co-host, prompting him to be worried about his popularity. Much to his relief, actress and model Tamara Brooks (Simone Griffeth) has stage fright, panicking. Bill is fearful for his life when his African-American makeup artist, Newdell, confronts him over Bill's comments about him.
3	3	"Woody Quits"	Jim Drake	Jay Tarses	June 15, 1983
After enduring insults from Bill for three years, Woody quits as a stage manager and demands an apology, prompting Bill to hire Newdell as his replacement. Newdell turns out to be an incompetent stage manager. Woody, who also works for a company that manages properties, threatens to evict Bill out of the apartment. In the station's cafeteria, Bill hurts Woody by pushing a chair onto him, but then apologizes. Woody takes it as an apology for Bill's past demeanor toward him.
4	4	"Buffalo Bill and the Movies"	Jim Drake	Mitch Markowitz	June 22, 1983
During his interview with actress Lauren Stockton, Bill calls Joan Seeger, the producer of the movie My Father's Blood (featuring Lauren), for an audition to be a character's father. After Bill loses the part, he rehearses a scene with a firefighter chief at the talk show to win his audience's esteem. Unfortunately, the rehearsed scene prompts the audience to praise the chief's "acting" abilities, leaving Bill disappointed. Even Woody thinks that Bill stunk and overacted.
5	5	"Mrs. Buffalo Bill?"	Jim Drake	Merrill Markoe	June 29, 1983
After he was turned down by women and friends for dinner, Bill sneaks into Jo-Jo's house by a window out of desperation, surprising her after a disastrous date with Nick. After seven months of flirting with and dating her, Bill proposes marriage to Jo-Jo and sleeps with her, but then he has second thoughts. To his relief, Jo-Jo refuses to marry him, only to have her change her mind to please him. Becoming indecisive, Jo-Jo says "tails" for refusal and flips a coin that shows "tails", setting both free from marriage.
6	6	"Wilkinson's Sword"	Tom Patchett	Tom Patchett	July 13, 1983
After his talk show Buffalo Bill is cancelled in favor of M*A*S*H reruns, Bill reluctantly takes Woody's job offer to work at the car dealer, Woody's Porsche+Audi. Using the name "Rudy," he is belligerent to customers and ruins car parts. JoJo demands that station manager Karl bring the show back. Karl turns to Mr. Wilkinson, who controls the programming of the station. Wilkinson lets Karl decide, and though he is somewhat hostile to Bill, Karl reluctantly resurrects Bill's show and transfers M*A*S*H to another channel -- where it will compete against Bill's show.
7	7	"Guess Who's Coming to Buffalo?"	Tom Patchett	Carol Gray	July 20, 1983
Bill's estranged daughter, Melanie, divorces her cheating husband Steve and wants attention from her father. Annoyed by her constant presence, Bill ends up berating her in front of everyone at the TV station. He can't ignore her at his apartment when she uses a noisy purifier, impacting his home life. In response, Melanie declares to the crew that she is moving to Fresno, California. Nevertheless, to Bill's chagrin, Melanie accepts a job offer at the station to join the crew. Buffalo Bill plans to depict Eddie "Crazy Eddie" Finsek's (Earl Pomerantz) stunts at Niagara Falls with his barrel.
8	8	"Below the Belt"	Tom Patchett	Carol Gray	July 27, 1983
Melanie, who becomes well-liked by the crew, feels neglected by Bill. When she threatens to move into Newdell's place, Bill becomes worried. During the talk show, Melanie outs herself as Bill's estranged daughter, confronts him over issues, like leaving his ex-wife and daughter behind, and is able to reconcile with him. Crazy Eddie ends up dead during a stunt at Niagara Falls, prompting Bill to interview his widowed wife.
9	9	"Ratings"	Tom Patchett	Gary Markowitz	August 3, 1983
Bill hears from Karl that the Nielsen ratings dropped. Bill tries to find fault with the staff, but he ends up blaming himself for losing touch with other people. After going to Jo-Jo for comfort at night, he goes to the bus station, meets the janitor Charles, who is an avid viewer of Buffalo Bill, and signs an autograph for him. Bill is punched by the homeless man for refusing to give him a quarter, leaving Bill unconscious. The following day, Woody wakes him up and carries him to the station. Bill realizes that he lost his wallet.
10	10	"True Love"	Jim Drake	Dennis Klein	August 10, 1983
Bill is attracted to Melanie's new friend, Angela Catumi (Rebecca Street), and wants her to play a flute on the talk show, but Karl refuses. When Bill goes against his orders, Karl interrupts the broadcast without regret. Angela breaks up with Bill, especially for his selfishness, after which Bill vengefully breaks everything in Karl's office.
11	11	"The Fan"	Tom Patchett	Jay Tarses	August 17, 1983
Bill is stalked by the frequent female caller Clara (Peggy Feura), who claims him as her baby's father. When she trespasses the station with fake janitor clothes and walks onto the talk show, Bill shows empathy for Clara, moving the audience and the crew. However, when Karl enters the broadcast booth and is swarmed by bees, he assumes it is the fault of Clara as "Alexander Hague," a bee expert who was supposed to be the talk show's guest.
12	12	"Hackles"	Dennis Klein	Dennis Klein	Unaired
Bill insults Dr. Solomon, the toxic waste expert, at the talk show and abrupts the interview by bringing in the Burt Reynolds-lookalike. Wendy confronts Bill, encouraged by Karl and Jo-Jo, and Bill shows sympathy to her, prompting her to reconcile. The following day, Bill changes Wendy's prepared questions for another guest against her will, but Wendy is reluctant to confront him.

=== Season 2: 1983–84 ===
No. overall	No. in season	Title	Directed by	Written by	Original release date
13	1	"Hit the Road, Newdell"	Tom Patchett	Dennis Klein	December 22, 1983
Having enough of makeup artist Newdell's patronization on Bill's ego, Bill tells Karl to fire Newdell. Fearing discrimination lawsuit and NAACP, Bill hires Newdell back. Before doing so, Bill confronts him about Newdell's attitude and tells him Bill's past story about taking a ride without his pants in a taxi driven by an African-American man. Newdell accepts taking his job back only to demand sharing Bill's dressing room, which he reluctantly accepts.
14	2	"Jerry Lewis Week"	Jim Drake	Dennis Klein	January 5, 1984
Karl stands up to Bill as the studio does a tribute to Jerry Lewis. In 1997, TV Guide ranked this episode #69 on its list of the 100 Greatest Episodes.
15	3	"The Interview"	Ellen Falcon	Dennis Klein	January 12, 1984
The staff has an interview with a TV news reporter (Gail Edwards) regarding their true feelings about Bill.
16	4	"Company Ink"	Tom Patchett	Tom Patchett	January 19, 1984
The station is sold to Bill's former boss (Martin Landau) who had fired him for sleeping with his wife.
17	5	"Jo-Jo's Problem: Part 1"	Jim Drake	Jay Tarses	January 26, 1984
For some reason, Jo-Jo is lashing out at everyone and her future with Bill may have something to do with it.
18	6	"Jo-Jo's Problem: Part 2"	Ellen Falcon	Jay Tarses	February 2, 1984
Jo-Jo's frustration increases when everyone learns about her problem.
19	7	"Miss WBFL"	Tom Patchett	Geena Davis	February 9, 1984
Jo-Jo plans to boycott the Miss WBFL beauty contest.
20	8	"The Big Freeze"	Tom Patchett	Dennis Klein	February 16, 1984
Wendy plans a segment about the nuclear freeze initiative.
21	9	"The Girl on the Jetty"	Jim Drake	Jay Tarses	February 23, 1984
Karl gets kicked out for bringing home his work problems and a romance with Jo-Jo blossoms when she takes him in.
22	10	"Buffalo Bill Versus the Kremlin"	Jim Drake	Dennis Klein	March 1, 1984
Bill's guests threaten him for accusing them of smuggling American computer technology into Communist countries.
23	11	"A Hero"	Jim Drake	Jay Tarses	March 8, 1984
Karl's son gets a job at WBFL since he idolizes Bill.
24	12	"The Tap Dancer"	Tom Patchett	Teleplay by : Gary Markowitz & Dennis Klein; Story by : Gary Markowitz	March 15, 1984
The last surviving member of the Alexandria Brothers Tap Dancers appears on the show, then dies during the big finish.
25	13	"Have Yourself a Very Degrading Christmas"	Tom Patchett	Dennis Klein	March 22, 1984
A Brazilian offers Bill a one-night stand for Christmas if he dresses like Santa Claus for the show.
26	14	"Church of the Poisoned Mind"	Ellen Falcon	Dennis Klein	March 29, 1984
The audience sees the real Bill when he accuses a Roman Catholic priest raising funds for a youth center of sexual misconduct.

== Reception ==
The series received 11 Emmy Award nominations (including two for Outstanding Comedy Series). Joanna Cassidy also won a Golden Globe Award in 1984. In 1999, TV Guide ranked Bill Bittinger number 42 on its 50 Greatest TV Characters of All Time list. Former NBC President Brandon Tartikoff wrote in his memoirs that his biggest professional regret was canceling the show.
