= Mitch Markowitz =

Canadian screenwriter

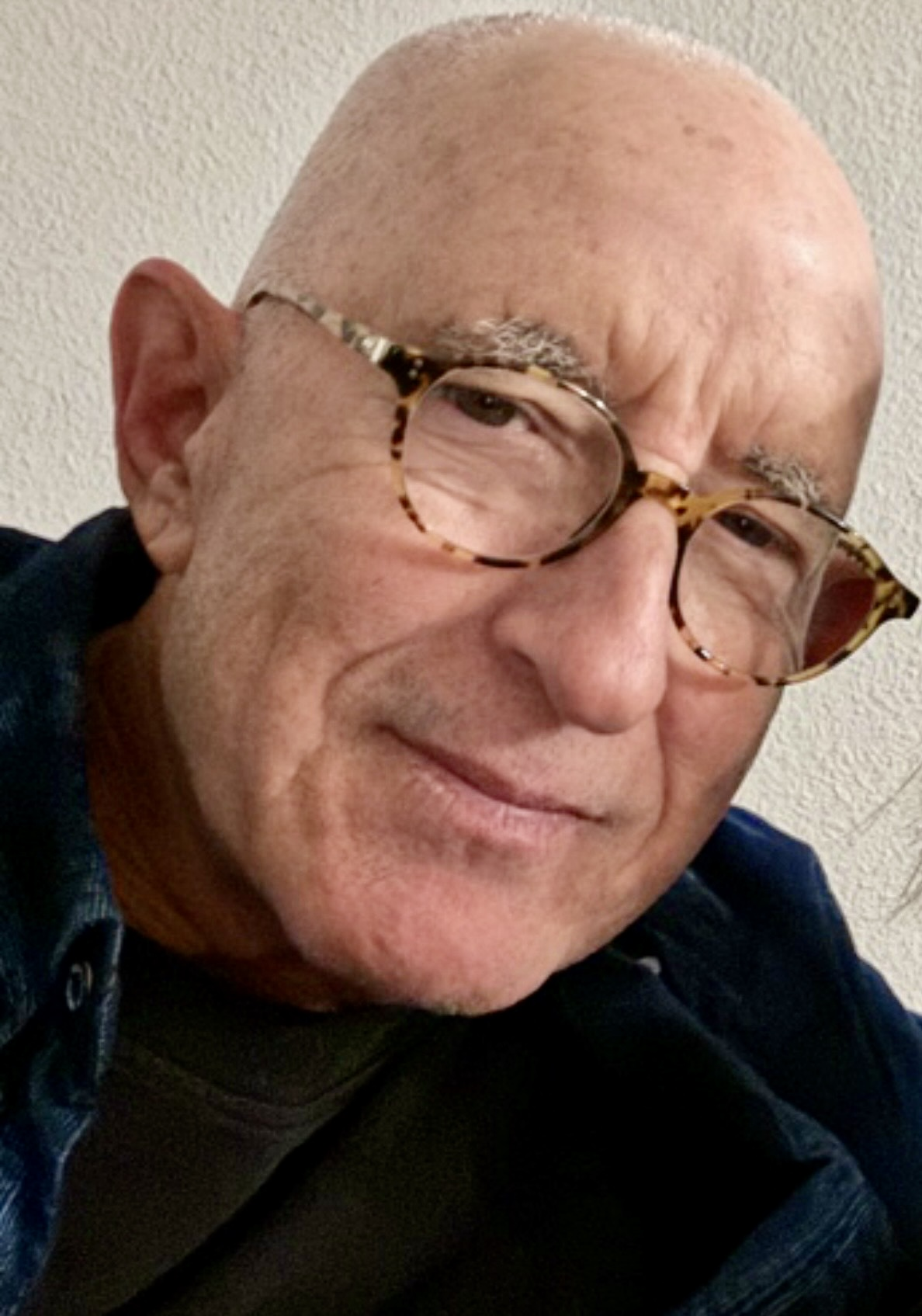
Canadian screenwriter, Mitch Markowitz

Mitch Markowitz is a Canadian screenwriter best known for writing the film Good Morning, Vietnam. He also wrote the movie Crazy People. His television credits include M*A*S*H, Van Dyke and Company, Best of the West, Report To Murphy, What's Happening?, Buffalo Bill, Monk, and Too Close For Comfort, among others. in 1977, Mitch was nominated by Academy of Television Arts & Sciences for Outstanding Writing In A Comedy-Variety Or Music Series for Van Dyke and Company.
