= Thad Mumford =

American television producer and writer (1951–2018)

- Born: Thaddeus Quentin Mumford Jr. February 8, 1951; Washington D.C., U.S.
- Died: September 6, 2018 (aged 67); Silver Spring, Maryland, U.S.
- Occupations: Television producer, television writer
- Years active: 1971–2001

Thaddeus Quentin Mumford Jr. (February 8, 1951 – September 6, 2018) was an American television producer and writer. He wrote and produced for a number of television series spanning different genres, including The Cosby Show, A Different World, M*A*S*H, Maude, Good Times, Home Improvement, Roots: The Next Generations, and Judging Amy, among other series.

== Career ==
Often collaborating with fellow TV producer/director Dan Wilcox, Mumford wrote scripts and/or produced for a number of television series throughout his career varying different genres namely, M*A*S*H (all of those episodes he produced were co-produced with Wilcox), The Cosby Show, A Different World, Maude, NYPD Blue, Good Times, Home Improvement, The Duck Factory, ALF, Roots: The Next Generations, Judging Amy, amongst other series.

In 1973, Mumford won a Primetime Emmy Award for his writing in The Electric Company. In 1978, a Sesame Street character was named after him (Dr. Thad of "Dr. Thad and the Medications", who sang "The Ten Commandments of Health"). Mumford also performed the voice for the character.

Mumford also gained some renown working as a batboy for the New York Yankees.

== Alleged connection to Basquiat Museum scandal ==
Unpaid storage units owned by Mumford that were auctioned off in May 2012 were said to contain an inscribed Emmy award, Yankees memorabilia, and multiple works on cardboard supposedly made by Jean-Michel Basquiat. The works changed hands several times and were subsequently displayed at the Orlando Museum of Art before being confiscated by the FBI.

While individuals implicated in the scandal have claimed various connections to Mumford, he signed a document in the presence of an FBI special agent stating, "At no time in the 1980s or at any other time did I meet with Jean-Michel Basquiat, and at no time did I acquire or purchase any paintings by him. Furthermore, at no time did I store any Basquiat painting at Ortiz Brothers Moving and Storage in Los Angeles or anywhere else."

== Death ==
Mumford died after a long illness on September 6, 2018, aged 67, at his father's home in Silver Spring, Maryland. His father, Thaddeus Mumford Sr., died of cancer a few weeks earlier on August 3, 2018.
