= Karen Hall =

American novelist (born 1956)

- Born: Karen Lynne Hall; June 2, 1956 (age 70); Chatham, Virginia, U.S.
- Education: College of William & Mary; University of Virginia
- Occupations: Television writer, producer, author, bookstore owner
- Notable work: M*A*S*H, Judging Amy
- Spouse: Chris Walker
- Children: 4

Karen Lynne Hall (born June 2, 1956) is an American television writer, producer, author, bookstore owner, and a member of the George Foster Peabody Awards board of jurors, best known for her work on the television series Judging Amy and M*A*S*H.

== Early life ==
Hall was born in Chatham, Virginia to Ervis Hall and Flo Hall, and graduated from Chatham High School in 1974. Hall's younger sister, Barbara Hall, is also a television writer and producer.

== Education ==
In 1978, Hall graduated with a B.A. in English from the College of William and Mary. She was awarded a fellowship from the Virginia Museum of Fine Arts to the University of Virginia, where she attended graduate school in the M.F.A. Playwriting Program.

While at William and Mary, Hall took a three-week trip to Hollywood with students from the University of Richmond where she attended writing seminars hosted by Earl Hamner and Alan Alda. Impressed by her talent, Hamner and Alda kept in touch with her after she returned to Virginia. With their encouragement, she moved to California after graduating from the University of Virginia in 1979.

== Career ==
Hall started her television writing career as a story editor for Eight Is Enough and script writer for M*A*S*H. In her career as writer, producer and creative consultant, Hall has worked on numerous series, including Hill Street Blues, Moonlighting, Roseanne, and Grace Under Fire. Shows for which she wrote individual episodes include Northern Exposure, I'll Fly Away, Judging Amy, and The Good Wife.

Among other recognition, Hall has received the Humanitas Prize, the Women in Film Luminas Award, and the Writers Guild of America Award. She has received seven Emmy Award nominations. In 1984, she was listed by Esquire (magazine) magazine in its first annual register "The Best of the New Generation: Men and Women under 40 Who Are Changing America".

Hall is also the author of the novel Dark Debts, a supernatural thriller combining horror, Southern Gothic, humor, romance, and theological mystery. Dark Debts was published by Random House in 1996 and was a Book of the Month Club main selection. It has been translated into French, German, and Japanese. After Hall had made significant changes to the novel, it was re-published by Simon & Schuster in 2016.

Hall has spent the last decade as an adjunct college professor. She has taught undergraduates at Appalachian State University and MFA screenwriting students at the University of Georgia and at Regent University, where she teaches at present.

== Personal life ==
Hall is married to her high school sweetheart, Chris Walker. They live in Orlando, Florida. They have four adult children.

== Select filmography ==
- Eight Is Enough (1977)
- Hill Street Blues (1981)
- M*A*S*H (1980–1983)
- Moonlighting (1985)
- The Women of Brewster Place (1989)
- Northern Exposure (1990)
- Judging Amy (1999)
- Brotherhood (2008)
- The Good Wife (2010)
- The Glades (2011)

== Publications ==
- Dark Debts. New York: Random House, 1996: ISBN 978-0-517-26786-8. Ivy Books, 1997: ISBN 978-0-8041-1655-8. Pan Books (UK), 1998: ISBN 978-0-330-35107-2. Simon & Schuster, 2016 revision: ISBN 978-1501104114
- The Sound of Silence: The Life and Cancelling of a Heroic Jesuit Priest, Crisis Publications, 2024: ISBN 979-8889112402
