= Burt Metcalfe =

Canadian-American actor (1935–2022)

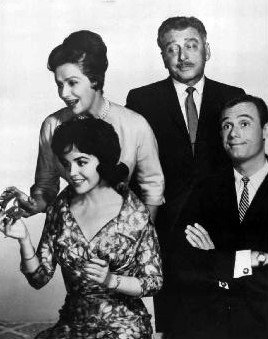
- From TV series Father of the Bride (1961). Back row, L-R: Ruth Warrick and Leon Ames. Front row, L-R: Myrna Fahey and Burt Metcalfe
- Born: Burton Denis Metcalfe; March 19, 1935; Saskatoon, Saskatchewan, Canada
- Died: July 27, 2022 (aged 87); Los Angeles, California, U.S.
- Occupations: Film producer; director; screenwriter; actor
- Years active: 1954–1993
- Notable work: M*A*S*H
- Spouses: Toby Harry Shipman (m. 1961; div. 1968) Jan Jorden (m. 1979)

Burton Denis Metcalfe (March 19, 1935 – July 27, 2022) was a Canadian-American film and television producer, director, screenwriter, and actor.

== Biography ==
Burton Denis Metcalfe was born in Saskatoon, but grew up in Montreal and latterly in Los Angeles. He received his bachelor's degree in theater in 1955 from University of California, Los Angeles. In 1956, he was drafted as an enlisted man into the United States Navy, serving two years. He was stationed at Ream Field, San Ysidro, California, where he held a public relations position. During this period, Metcalfe acting as the lead, working closely with some of his fellow enlisted comrades created the "Miss Angel" beauty contest. An "Angel" in Navy terms meaning a helicopter that would swoop in saving downed pilots who ditched their aircraft in the sea and in some cases on land. Ream Field at that time was virtually the "helicopter capitol of the world".

In 1959, Metcalfe had a small role in the movie Gidget, as Lord Byron, the existentialist surfer, hanging 10 with The Big Kahuna's crew. That same year, he was cast as Tom Easton, a young United States Army officer, in the episode "Indian Emily" on the syndicated television anthology series, Death Valley Days.

Metcalfe was cast as Don Martin, one of the neighbors thrown into a panic in a 1960 episode of Rod Serling's The Twilight Zone titled "The Monsters Are Due On Maple Street".

In 1960–1961, Metcalfe landed an acting role as Joe Brigham in the NBC sitcom Happy, and from 1961 to 1962, starred on the CBS sitcom Father of the Bride, based on the 1950 film. Between 1962 and 1965, Metcalfe made three guest appearances on Perry Mason: as Richard Campion in "The Case of the Polka-Dot Pony," murderer John Lathrop in "The Case of the Careless Kidnapper," and Jeffrey Mills in "The Case of the Thermal Thief."

His most notable work was as a writer for the hit CBS series M*A*S*H and he was the only producer to stay with the TV series during its entire run from 1972 to 1983. Originally the series' associate producer, Metcalfe was promoted to line producer in 1976 when Larry Gelbart left the series and then to executive producer in 1977, when Gene Reynolds moved on. He then moved to Warner Bros. Television in the mid-1980s, until he joined MTM Enterprises as executive producer-director of various projects/sitcoms on November 24, 1986, where he had joined as an independent production house an in effort to expand MTM's strategy beyond primetime television to include off-net markets and cable/pay cable.

== Career achievements ==
Metcalfe was nominated 13 times for Primetime Emmy Awards for his work as a writer on the series M*A*S*H between 1975 and 1983.

Metcalfe also served as the executive producer for the M*A*S*H 30th Anniversary Reunion Special, which aired on FOX in September 2002.

== Personal life ==
Metcalfe was married to and divorced from Toby Richman. On December 31, 1979, he married actress Jan Jorden, who is best known for her recurring role as a nurse on M*A*S*H.

Metcalfe died from sepsis at a hospital in Los Angeles, on July 27, 2022, aged 87.

== Partial filmography ==
- The Bridges at Toko-Ri (1954) – Military Police Sergeant (uncredited)
- The Space Children (1958) – Guard (uncredited)
- Steve Canyon (1958) – Buckley
- Gidget (1959) – Lord Byron
- Don't Give Up the Ship (1959) – Lt. Bond (uncredited)
- The Twilight Zone (1960) – Don Martin (Season 1 Episode 22: "The Monsters Are Due on Maple Street")
- The Canadians (1961) – Constable Springer
- The Outer Limits (1963) – Eddie Phillips (Season 1 Episode 1: "The Galaxy Being")
- Diamonds Are Forever (1971) – Agent Maxwell (uncredited)
