= M*A*S*H season 4 =

M*A*S*H
- Season 4
- No. of episodes: 25

Release
- Original network: CBS
- Original release: September 12, 1975 – February 24, 1976

Season chronology
- ← Previous; Season 3 Next → Season 5

The fourth season of M*A*S*H aired Fridays at 8:30–9:00 pm from September 12 to November 28, 1975 and Tuesdays at 9:00–9:30 pm from December 2, 1975 to February 24, 1976 on CBS.

== Cast ==
=== Main ===
- Alan Alda as Capt. Benjamin Franklin "Hawkeye" Pierce
- Mike Farrell as Capt. B.J. Hunnicutt
- Harry Morgan as Col. Sherman T. Potter
- Loretta Swit as Maj. Margaret Houlihan
- Larry Linville as Maj. Frank Burns
- Gary Burghoff as Cpl. Walter "Radar" O'Reilly
- Jamie Farr as Cpl. Maxwell Q. Klinger

=== Recurring ===
- William Christopher as Lt. Father Francis Mulcahy

== Episodes ==
No. overall	No. in season	Title (Note: Titles taken from DVD)	Directed by (Note: Credits from episode title cards)	Written by	Original release date	Prod. code (Note: Production Code from end credits)
73	1	"Welcome to Korea"	Gene Reynolds	Everett Greenbaum & Jim Fritzell and Larry Gelbart	September 12, 1975	G-504
74	2	"Welcome to Korea"	Gene Reynolds	Everett Greenbaum & Jim Fritzell and Larry Gelbart	September 12, 1975	G-506
The opening titles include quotes from Generals Dwight D. Eisenhower ("I will go to Korea") and Raymond W. Bliss ("A terrible place to be"). While on R&R, Hawkeye misses Trapper John's discharge, and tries to say goodbye but misses him by 10 minutes, but he meets his new ally in Captain B.J. Hunnicutt (Mike Farrell). First (preview) appearance of Harry Morgan as Colonel Sherman Potter. Gene Reynolds won the Primetime Emmy Award for directing this episode while Fred W. Berger and Stanford Tischler won for editing. Everett Greenbaum, Jim Fritzell and Larry Gelbart won the Writers Guild Award. The Eisenhower quotation is from his November 1952 campaign for President.
75	3	"Change of Command"	Gene Reynolds	Jim Fritzell & Everett Greenbaum	September 19, 1975	G-501
When Frank learns he's going to be replaced as commanding officer, he throws a tantrum and goes AWOL. Colonel Sherman Potter (Harry Morgan) assumes command of the 4077th, and orders Klinger to get into uniform, but when his body rejects it, Hawkeye tells him to wear a slip underneath. Col. Potter soon gets acquainted with Hawkeye and B.J., bonding with them post-surgery over drinks and a chorus of There's a Long Long Trail A-Winding. Larry Gelbart voice announces the date on this episode September 19, 1952
76	4	"It Happened One Night"	Gene Reynolds	Story by : Gene Reynolds; Teleplay by : Larry Gelbart & Simon Muntner	September 26, 1975	G-502
The 4077th is shaken up by heavy artillery during a long, cold night. Frank ransacks Margaret's tent for love letters. Klinger tries to catch pneumonia. When a patient B.J. had operated on doesn't improve, he has to open him up again.
77	5	"The Late Captain Pierce"	Alan Alda	Glen Charles & Les Charles	October 3, 1975	G-507
B.J. gets a call from Hawkeye's father — the Army mistakenly lists Hawkeye as dead. Hawkeye tries to take advantage of the situation, but it isn't as good as he thinks. He can't receive any pay, send out or receive any mail, telegrams, or phone calls. Note – Gary Burghoff, Loretta Swit, and William Christopher do not appear in this episode. Timeline: President-elect Dwight Eisenhower’s visit to South Korea (which is why Hawkeye can’t communicate stateside because of security concerns) happened in December 1952.
78	6	"Hey, Doc"	William Jurgensen	Rick Mittleman	October 10, 1975	G-510
The 4077th receives special requests from British and American officers to deal with an ingrown toenail and a case of VD. Hawkeye and B.J. try to help a supply sergeant get home early, while also dealing with a stolen microscope. A sniper terrorizes the unit until a tank is brought in, and Frank, trying to drive it, nearly destroys the camp.
79	7	"The Bus"	Gene Reynolds	John D. Hess	October 17, 1975	G-512
Hawkeye, B.J. Hunnicutt, Frank Burns, Col. Potter, and Radar are stranded in unfamiliar territory when their bus breaks down on the way back from a medical conference. Radar becomes lost and a wounded North Korean soldier surrenders to the doctors. Note: This episode has no laugh track. Note – Loretta Swit, William Christopher, and Jamie Farr do not appear in this episode.
80	8	"Dear Mildred"	Alan Alda	Everett Greenbaum & Jim Fritzell	October 24, 1975	G-505
While Col. Potter writes to his wife Mildred on their 27th wedding anniversary, Frank and Margaret seek a proper gift from a local artist and Radar gives Potter an even more special gift of a horse he convinced Hawkeye and B.J. to save.
81	9	"The Kids"	Alan Alda	Jim Fritzell & Everett Greenbaum	October 31, 1975	G-511
The 4077th cares for Korean orphans at Christmastime when Meg Cratty arrives. B.J. delivers a baby and treats the wounded mother. Alan Alda received a Primetime Emmy Award nomination for directing this episode.
82	10	"Quo Vadis, Captain Chandler?"	Larry Gelbart	Burt Prelutsky	November 7, 1975	G-513
A wounded bombardier (Alan Fudge) believes he's Jesus Christ, which brings him to the attention of both Colonel Flagg (Edward Winter) and Dr. Sidney Freedman (Allan Arbus). Note: This episode has no laugh track.
83	11	"Dear Peggy"	Burt Metcalfe	Jim Fritzell & Everett Greenbaum	November 14, 1975	G-509
B.J. writes to his wife Peggy about life at the 4077th. Episode features Ned Beatty as a visiting senior chaplain who's there to inspect Father Mulcahy. Note: Hawkeye refers to Richard Nixon as our Vice President setting the episode in 1953.
84	12	"Of Moose and Men"	John Erman	Jay Folb	November 21, 1975	G-503
A colonel (Tim O'Connor) gets a grudge with Hawkeye. B.J. helps a Sergeant who gets a Dear John letter from his wife. Frank becomes paranoid about potential bomb threats in the camp. Note – William Christopher and Jamie Farr do not appear in this episode.
85	13	"Soldier of the Month"	Gene Reynolds	Linda Bloodworth	November 28, 1975	G-514
Potter announces a Soldier of the Month contest, which Klinger tries to cheat to win, while Frank gets delirious from Hemorrhagic Fever.
86	14	"The Gun"	Burt Metcalfe	Larry Gelbart & Gene Reynolds	December 2, 1975	G-517
Frank steals the rare gun of a wounded colonel (Warren Stevens) from the weapons locker, and lets Radar take the fall when the gun goes missing.
87	15	"Mail Call...Again"	George Tyne	Jim Fritzell & Everett Greenbaum	December 9, 1975	G-518
Mail arrives at the 4077th. Col. Potter learns he's a grandfather, Hawkeye gets his hometown newspaper, Radar gets a home movie from his family, and Frank learns his wife has found out about his affair with Margaret and is asking for a divorce. Note – In the home movie, Gary Burghoff plays his character's mother Mrs. O'Reilly.
88	16	"The Price of Tomato Juice"	Gene Reynolds	Larry Gelbart & Gene Reynolds	December 16, 1975	G-519
In his ongoing efforts to please Col. Potter, Radar does everything he can to obtain a supply of tomato juice.
89	17	"Dear Ma"	Alan Alda	Everett Greenbaum & Jim Fritzell	December 23, 1975	G-515
Radar writes to his mother about the 4077th's monthly foot inspection, B.J. getting scammed by a patient and Colonel Potter's bullet wound. Timeline:Klinger writes to President Dwight Eisenhower making this January 1953.
90	18	"Der Tag"	Gene Reynolds	Everett Greenbaum & Jim Fritzell	January 6, 1976	G-522
Potter asks Hawkeye and B.J. to be nice to Frank while Margaret's in Tokyo. The three go out gambling and drinking. A drunken Frank boards an ambulance which takes him to a frontline aid station, where the medic in charge (Joe Morton) looks after him.
91	19	"Hawkeye"	Larry Gelbart	Larry Gelbart & Simon Muntner	January 13, 1976	G-520
Hawkeye gets a concussion in a jeep accident and finds shelter in a Korean farmer's home, where he talks nonstop to maintain consciousness while one of the family members goes for help. Note – Alan Alda is the only regular cast member to appear in this episode.
92	20	"Some 38th Parallels"	Burt Metcalfe	Regier & Markowitz (Note: John W. Regier & Gary Markowitz)	January 20, 1976	G-521
Radar bonds with a patient, Hawkeye is unable to bond with a nurse, and Frank decides the camp's garbage could be as valuable as war bonds. Note – Loretta Swit does not appear in this episode.
93	21	"The Novocaine Mutiny"	Harry Morgan	Burt Prelutsky	January 27, 1976	G-523
Frank charges Hawkeye with mutiny, but they have different views of the circumstances leading to the court martial. Note – Loretta Swit does not appear in this episode. Timeline: The date of the Court Martial is October 1952
94	22	"Smilin' Jack"	Charles Dubin	Larry Gelbart & Simon Muntner	February 3, 1976	G-508
A helicopter pilot with diabetes (Robert J. Hogan) is determined to win the annual pilots' competition for bringing in the most wounded, even if he has to risk his health and life to do it. Note – William Christopher and Jamie Farr do not appear in this episode. The PA announcement at the end of the episode is a reference to the battle of Solma-Ri, also known as "Gloucesters Hill" or the battle of the Imjin River. Mention of this battle places the date this episode is set as being between April 22nd and 25th, 1951, with the high casualty figure indicating a most probable date of either the 24th or 25th of April.
95	23	"The More I See You"	Gene Reynolds	Larry Gelbart & Gene Reynolds	February 10, 1976	G-524
One of Hawkeye's old flames (Blythe Danner) is assigned to the 4077th, and old tensions rise. Note – Larry Linville and Loretta Swit do not appear in this episode.
96	24	"Deluge"	William Jurgensen	Larry Gelbart & Simon Muntner	February 17, 1976	G-516
The 4077th is overrun with casualties from an unexpected offensive. Note – The PA announcement tells of the Chinese entering the war, which happened in the Chosin Reservoir campaign of November 1950, not October 1952.
97	25	"The Interview"	Larry Gelbart	Larry Gelbart	February 24, 1976	G-525
A news correspondent (Clete Roberts) visits the 4077th to get their feelings about the war. Note: This episode was filmed in black and white and was the final episode for series developer Larry Gelbart. Note – Loretta Swit does not appear in this episode.

== Reception ==
In 1997, TV Guide ranked "The Interview" #80 on its list of the 100 Greatest Episodes. "Quo Vadis, Captain Chandler?" was nominated for a Humanitas Prize, but lost to another M*A*S*H episode.
