= Tom Sullivan (singer) =

American singer

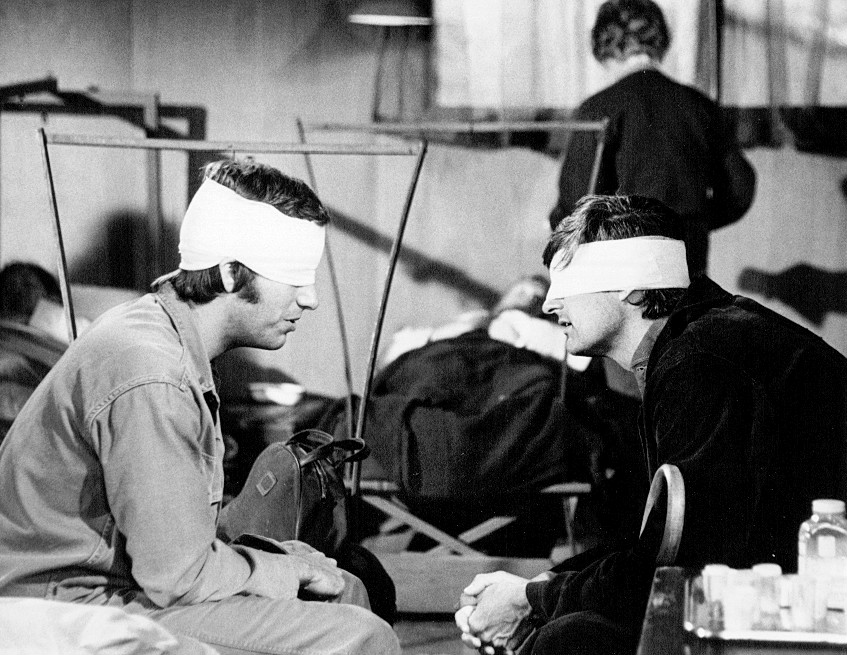
- Sullivan (left) in a 1976 episode of M*A*S*H
- Born: March 27, 1947 (age 79); Boston, Massachusetts, U.S.
- Occupations: Singer; actor; writer; motivational speaker
- Years active: 1969–present

Tom Sullivan (born March 27, 1947) is an American singer, actor, writer, and motivational speaker. Blind since infancy, he has been a public advocate for assistive services for the blind, and research into treatments for blindness.

== Personal life ==
Sullivan was born and raised in Boston, Massachusetts, the son of Marie C. (née Kelly) and Thomas J. Sullivan, who owned a saloon. His premature birth caused him to need oxygen treatment while in an incubator. Though the treatment saved his life, he was given too much oxygen, which left him permanently blind. (This condition is now known as retinopathy of prematurity.)

Sullivan had a close and lifelong friendship with actress Betty White and her husband Allen Ludden; they met in 1968 while they were performing in Cape Cod. Sullivan and White co-wrote a book, Leading Lady, about Sullivan's first seeing eye dog, who lived with White after being retired.

== Career ==
Sullivan has worked as an author, composer, motivational speaker, and singer, as well as an actor, director, and producer. Sullivan sang "The Star-Spangled Banner", the national anthem of the United States, at Super Bowl X, and the 1976 Indianapolis 500.

He played a recently blinded soldier in a 1976 episode of M*A*S*H, which led to additional acting roles. He also starred as a blind business owner in the WKRP in Cincinnati episode "To Err is Human". He had a recurring role on Highway to Heaven as Frank Riley, who ultimately marries Priscilla Barnes's character. Among the songs Sullivan has written and performed are "All the Colors Of the Heart", which was used as the theme for his debut episode of Highway to Heaven.

If You Could See What I Hear, a 1982 movie based on his time in college, was directed by Eric Till and starred Marc Singer as Sullivan.

== Awards ==
- Sullivan won the American Foundation for the Blind's "Helen Keller Achievement Award" in 1997.

== Discography ==
=== Studio albums ===
List of albums, with selected details and chart positions
Title	Album details	Peak chart positions
Title	Album details	AUS
If You Could See What I Hear	Released: 1972; Format: LP; Label: Perception	—
Yes I'm Ready / Tom Sullivan	Released: 1976; Format: LP; Label: ABC Music (ABCD-967)	97

=== Singles ===
List of singles, with selected chart positions
Title	Year	Peak chart positions
Title	Year	AUS
"Beauty Is in the Eyes of the Beholder"	1975	—
"Yes I'm Ready"	1976	74
"Fools Rush In"	1976	—
"If You Could See What I Hear"	1982	—

== Selected television and movie credits ==
=== Acting filmography ===
- Touched by an Angel (in episode "Then Sings my Soul" as Clarence), 1999
- Renegade (in episode "Love Hurts" as Denny Martin), 1996
- Designing Women (in episode "One Sees, the Other Doesn't" as Danny), 1989
- Highway to Heaven (two episodes, as Frank Riley)
- Knight Rider (in episode "Knight Song" as Charley Connors), 1985
- Search for Tomorrow (as Michael Kendall), 1983
- Mork & Mindy (in episode "Mork Learns to See" as Tom Bickley), 1980
- Airport '77 (as Steve), 1977
- M*A*S*H (in episode "Out of Sight, Out of Mind" as Tom Straw), 1976
- WKRP in Cincinnati (in episode "To Err is Human" as Hester Sherman), 1982
- Fame (in episode "Solo Song" as blind vocal coach), 1982

=== Miscellaneous filmography ===
- The Late Late Show with Craig Ferguson (as himself with his seeing eye dog named Eddison, a German Shepherd). Right after Julie Chen and before Michelle Yeoh. July 30, 2008.
- Moving Through Space: A Day with Tom Sullivan (composer of song "Idle Hands"), 2003.
- Good Morning America (as himself – feature correspondent), 1978–1983
- Super Bowl X (sang "The Star-Spangled Banner" with the cast of Up with People), Jan. 18, 1976
- Black Sunday (sang "The Star-Spangled Banner" with the cast of Up with People), 1977

== Bibliography ==
- If You Could See What I Hear (1975) ISBN 978-0-06-014167-7
- Tom Sullivan's Adventures In Darkness (1976) ISBN 978-0-7852-2081-7
- The Leading Lady. Dinah's Story (1991, with Betty White) ISBN 978-0-553-07395-9
- Seeing Lessons: 14 Life Secrets I've Learned Along the Way (2003) ISBN 978-0-471-26356-2
- Together: A novel of shared vision (2008, with Betty White) ISBN 978-1-59554-456-8
- Alive Day: A Story of Love and Loyalty (2009), with Betty White ISBN 978-1-59554-457-5
