= Walter Dishell =

American physician

- Born: Walter David Dischell; July 16, 1939 (age 86); Detroit, Michigan, U.S.
- Occupations: Otolaryngologist, medical consultant, TV screenwriter
- Years active: 1966–present
- Known for: Medical advisor for TV series: Medical Center; Trapper John, M.D. M*A*S*H; Knots Landing

Walter David Dishell (born July 16, 1939) is an American physician who has served as a medical consultant on several long-running TV shows, including M*A*S*H; Medical Center; Trapper John, M.D.; and Knots Landing. Dishell is an ear, nose and throat (ENT) specialist, head and neck surgeon, and facial cosmetic surgeon.

== Early life ==
Dishell was born in Detroit, Michigan. He attended medical school at the University of Michigan.

== Career ==
Dishell, who is subspecialized in facial cosmetic surgery, began using his medical background in entertainment when, soon after he completed his residency in plastic surgery at UCLA, CBS asked him to be a medical adviser for the show Medical Center in the 1960s. Like many similar shows, Medical Center focused on physician-patient relationships instead of the actual medicine itself. Dishell said that "the disease itself didn't matter... [CBS] would give me a dramatic story and then I would build the medicine around it.”

One challenge Dishell faced as a medical consultant for M*A*S*H was always making sure that the medicine practiced on the show was not too advanced. Dishell consulted medical textbooks from the 1950s and professional publications like the Journal of War Surgery to ensure the show’s historical accuracy. Dishell collaborated with Alda writing “Life Time”, an episode of the series that follows a patient needing an aortic graft in real time.

Dishell was also the medical reporter for NBC News from 1983 to 1985, and frequently appeared on ABC's A.M. Los Angeles as a medical consultant. In 1986, he established the Aesthetic Surgery Associates of Encino, California.
