= M*A*S*H season 3 =

M*A*S*H
- Season 3
- No. of episodes: 24

Release
- Original network: CBS
- Original release: September 10, 1974 – March 18, 1975

Season chronology
- ← Previous; Season 2 Next → Season 4

The third season of M*A*S*H aired Tuesdays at 8:30–9:00 pm on CBS from September 10, 1974 to March 18, 1975.

== Cast ==
=== Main ===
- Alan Alda as Capt. Benjamin Franklin "Hawkeye" Pierce
- Wayne Rogers as Capt. "Trapper" John MacIntyre
- McLean Stevenson as Lt. Col. Henry Blake
- Loretta Swit as Maj. Margaret "Hot Lips" Houlihan
- Larry Linville as Maj. Frank Burns
- Gary Burghoff as Cpl. Walter "Radar" O'Reilly

=== Recurring ===
- William Christopher as Lt. Father Francis Mulcahy
- Odessa Cleveland as Lt. Ginger Bayliss
- Jamie Farr as Cpl. Maxwell Klinger
- Johnny Haymer as SSgt. Zelmo Zale
- Jeff Maxwell as Pvt. Igor Straminsky
- Kellye Nakahara as Lt. Kellye Nakahara
- Loudon Wainwright III as Capt. Calvin Spalding †‡

Notes

- † First season as a recurring character
- ‡ Last season as a recurring character

== Episodes ==
No. overall	No. in season	Title (Note: Titles taken from DVD)	Directed by (Note: Credits from episode title cards)	Written by	Original release date	Prod. code (Note: Production Code from end credits)
49	1	"The General Flipped at Dawn"	Larry Gelbart	Jim Fritzell & Everett Greenbaum	September 10, 1974	B-308
A crackpot Major General wants to move the camp closer to the front. He then threatens to court-martial Hawkeye. Harry Morgan, who portrays the nutty General, would join the cast of M*A*S*H the following year as Colonel Sherman Potter. Note: Harry Morgan was nominated for a Primetime Emmy Award for his performance in this episode.
50	2	"Rainbow Bridge"	Hy Averback	Larry Gelbart & Laurence Marks	September 17, 1974	B-301
Hawkeye and Trapper must put their relaxation plans on hold to retrieve wounded American prisoners from the Chinese. Japanese actor Mako portrays a Chinese officer involved in the transfer. Loudon Wainwright III makes his first of three appearances as guitar-playing Lieutenant Calvin Spalding.
51	3	"Officer of the Day"	Hy Averback	Laurence Marks	September 24, 1974	B-307
Hawkeye is made Officer of the Day, and Lieutenant Colonel Flagg wants him to patch up a North Korean prisoner so that he can be executed. He also deals with thieving kids, Koreans seeking medical attention and Klinger attempting to go AWOL. Note – McLean Stevenson does not appear in this episode.
52	4	"Iron Guts Kelly"	Don Weis	Larry Gelbart & Sid Dorfman	October 1, 1974	B-304
Lieutenant General "Iron Guts" Kelly (James Gregory) dies whilst in bed with Hot Lips, but Lt. Gen. Kelly's aide (Keene Curtis) invents a more militarily meaningful way to mark Kelly's passing.
53	5	"O.R."	Gene Reynolds	Larry Gelbart & Laurence Marks	October 8, 1974	B-306
The 4077th is overwhelmed with casualties. Note: This is the first episode without a laugh track. Timeline: A PA announcement at the end of the episode says Gen. Mark Clark was placed in command of all UN forces. This happened on May 12, 1952. Gene Reynolds won the Primetime Emmy Award for directing this episode while Larry Gelbart and Laurence Marks won the Writers Guild Award.
54	6	"Springtime"	Don Weis	Linda Bloodworth & Mary Kay Place	October 15, 1974	B-303
Spring is in the air at the 4077th, including marriage for Klinger. Alex Karras guest stars as one of Hawkeye's overly thankful patients, and co-writer Mary Kay Place as Radar's love interest.
55	7	"Check-Up"	Don Weis	Laurence Marks	October 22, 1974	B-312
Trapper's latest medical checkup reveals that he has an ulcer which could earn him a discharge from the Army.
56	8	"Life with Father"	Hy Averback	Everett Greenbaum & Jim Fritzell	October 29, 1974	B-302
Father Mulcahy tries to meet a request to perform a Jewish Bris, while Henry is worried that his wife's willingness to let him cheat on her may reflect her own guilty conscience, and Hawkeye and Trapper attempt to solve a puzzle to win a pony.
57	9	"Alcoholics Unanimous"	Hy Averback	Everett Greenbaum & Jim Fritzell	November 12, 1974	B-314
As acting commanding officer, Frank dismantles the Swamp's gin still and declares Prohibition at the 4077th. Hy Averback received Primetime Emmy and Directors Guild Award nominations for this episode. Note – McLean Stevenson does not appear in this episode.
58	10	"There Is Nothing Like a Nurse"	Hy Averback	Larry Gelbart	November 19, 1974	B-309
The men of the 4077th must cope without the nurses, who are evacuated due to the possibility of an enemy attack. Loudon Wainwright III makes his second of three appearances as the guitar-playing Lieutenant Calvin Spalding.
59	11	"Adam's Ribs"	Gene Reynolds	Laurence Marks	November 26, 1974	B-316
Fed up with eating the same food day after day in the mess tent, Hawkeye hatches a plan to order spare ribs from a restaurant in Chicago. Note – Loretta Swit and Larry Linville do not appear in this episode.
60	12	"A Full Rich Day"	Gene Reynolds	John D. Hess	December 3, 1974	B-311
A kill-happy Turk (Sirri Murad) and a missing corpse are the main focus of a typical day of insanity at the 4077th, while a lieutenant coerces Hawkeye and Trapper into giving priority to his wounded sergeant. Fred W. Berger and Stanford Tischler won the ACE Eddie Award for this episode.
61	13	"Mad Dogs and Servicemen"	Hy Averback	Linda Bloodworth & Mary Kay Place	December 10, 1974	B-317
As the search goes on for a potentially rabid dog that has bitten Radar, the doctors suspect a patient suffering from paralysis (Michael O'Keefe) might have a psychological issue instead.
62	14	"Private Charles Lamb"	Hy Averback	Sid Dorfman	December 31, 1974	B-310
A Greek colonel donates a baby lamb as the main course for an Easter barbecue for his wounded men and the 4077th, but Radar tries to protect it. Sid Dorfman received a Writers Guild Award nomination for this episode.
63	15	"Bombed"	Hy Averback	Jim Fritzell & Everett Greenbaum	January 7, 1975	B-320
A wounded soldier arrives at the compound, booby-trapped, during heavy shelling; and Trapper and Margaret get locked in the supply closet together when an exploding shell jams the door. Henry is injured when the latrine he's in is destroyed. William Jurgensen received a Primetime Emmy Award nomination for cinematography on this episode, and Hy Averback received a Directors Guild Award nomination.
64	16	"Bulletin Board"	Alan Alda	Larry Gelbart & Simon Muntner	January 14, 1975	B-323
Henry Blake loses a patient and resists holding an outdoor picnic to benefit local orphans, but is revived by the activities even though casualties interrupt the fun. Alan Alda received a Primetime Emmy Award nomination for directing this episode.Timeline:November 1952 Dwight Eisenhower vows if he is elected US President, he'll go to Korea. In the episode The Late Captain Pierce December 1952: Eisenhower does go to Korea after being elected President
65	17	"The Consultant"	Gene Reynolds	Story by : Larry Gelbart; Teleplay by : Robert Klane	January 21, 1975	B-318
In Tokyo for R&R, Hawkeye and Trapper meet a veteran doctor (Robert Alda) whom they challenge to visit the 4077th for a look at 'real action.' Note: Robert Alda, the father of Alan Alda, would play the same character in the season 8 episode "Lend a Hand".
66	18	"House Arrest"	Hy Averback	Jim Fritzell & Everett Greenbaum	February 4, 1975	B-315
Hawkeye is placed under house arrest for punching Frank, while Margaret is nervous about a meticulous visiting colonel (Mary Wickes) who turns out to be quite warm for Frank's form.
67	19	"Aid Station"	William Jurgensen	Larry Gelbart & Simon Muntner	February 11, 1975	B-322
Hawkeye, Margaret, and Klinger are sent to a frontline aid station that is short-staffed and under heavy fire.
68	20	"Love and Marriage"	Lee Philips	Arthur Julian	February 18, 1975	B-321
A skilled Korean medical assistant (Soon-Tek Oh) wants to see his pregnant wife. Meanwhile, a GI (Dennis Dugan) wants to marry a girl from Rosie's bar, but not for good reasons.
69	21	"Big Mac"	Don Weis	Laurence Marks	February 25, 1975	B-313
The 4077th is turned upside down by an announced visit from General Douglas MacArthur. Loudon Wainwright III makes his third and final appearance as the guitar-playing Lieutenant Calvin Spalding. Note:MacArthur did visit Korea but in September 1950
70	22	"Payday"	Hy Averback	Regier & Markowitz (Note: John W. Regier & Gary Markowitz)	March 4, 1975	B-305
It's Hawkeye's turn as pay officer, but a $10 oversight causes major trouble.
71	23	"White Gold"	Hy Averback	Larry Gelbart & Simon Muntner	March 11, 1975	B-319
Lt. Colonel Flagg shows up when penicillin is stolen, but Hawkeye and Trapper soon learn the real reason for his arrival.
72	24	"Abyssinia, Henry"	Larry Gelbart	Everett Greenbaum & Jim Fritzell	March 18, 1975	B-324
Henry Blake receives his discharge, and the doctors send him off in style. Note – This is the final episode for both McLean Stevenson and Wayne Rogers. 1952 is given as the current year, based on a present Radar gives Lt. Col. Blake. In 1997 and 2009, TV Guide ranked this episode #20 on its list of the 100 Greatest Episodes.
