= Heal Thyself =

Heal Thyself may refer to:

- "Heal Thyself", an episode from season 5 of TV show Northern Exposure
- "Heal Thyself", an episode from season 8 of TV show M*A*S*H
