= M*A*S*H season 5 =

M*A*S*H
- Season 5
- No. of episodes: 25

Release
- Original network: CBS
- Original release: September 21, 1976 – March 15, 1977

Season chronology
- ← Previous; Season 4 Next → Season 6

The fifth season of M*A*S*H aired Tuesdays at 9:00–9:30 pm on CBS from September 21, 1976 to March 15, 1977. The season was Larry Linville's final season on the show.

== Cast ==
- Alan Alda as Capt. Benjamin Franklin "Hawkeye" Pierce
- Mike Farrell as Capt. B.J. Hunnicutt
- Harry Morgan as Col. Sherman T. Potter
- Loretta Swit as Maj. Margaret Houlihan
- Larry Linville as Maj. Frank Burns
- Gary Burghoff as Cpl. Walter "Radar" O'Reilly
- Jamie Farr as Cpl. Maxwell Q. Klinger
- William Christopher as Lt. Father Francis Mulcahy

== Episodes ==
No. overall	No. in season	Title (Note: Titles taken from DVD)	Directed by (Note: Credits from episode title cards)	Written by	Original release date	Prod. code (Note: Production Code from end credits)
98	1	"Bug Out"	Gene Reynolds	Jim Fritzell & Everett Greenbaum	September 21, 1976	U-801
99	2	"Bug Out"	Gene Reynolds	Jim Fritzell & Everett Greenbaum	September 21, 1976	U-802
The 4077th bugs out in fear of a Chinese advance, but Hawkeye, Margaret and Radar must stay behind with a patient who can't be moved. Note – This is the first appearance of Eileen Saki who will take over the role of Rosie.
100	3	"Margaret's Engagement"	Alan Alda	Gary Markowitz	September 28, 1976	U-803
Margaret gets engaged in Tokyo while on temporary duty and the surgeons brace themselves for Frank's reaction. Swit was credited as advocating for the storyline to the show's writers. Note – William Christopher and Jamie Farr do not appear in this episode.
101	4	"Out of Sight, Out of Mind"	Gene Reynolds	Ken Levine & David Isaacs	October 5, 1976	U-806
An explosion causes Hawkeye to go blind. Tom Sullivan makes his television debut as a patient who lost his sight in combat. Able is played by Judy Farrell, Mike Farrell's wife at the time this episode aired. First episode written by Levine and Isaacs. Note – William Christopher does not appear in this episode.
102	5	"Lt. Radar O'Reilly"	Alan Rafkin	Everett Greenbaum & Jim Fritzell	October 12, 1976	U-805
Hawkeye and B.J. arrange for Radar to be Commissioned as a 2nd Lieutenant, but Radar realizes he feels better as a Corporal. Alan Rafkin received a Primetime Emmy Award nomination for directing this episode.
103	6	"The Nurses"	Joan Darling	Linda Bloodworth	October 19, 1976	U-809
A feud between Margaret and the nurses results in disciplinary action against Nurse Baker (Linda Kelsey) on her honeymoon. Gregory Harrison, who later starred in Trapper John, M.D., guest stars as Baker's husband Tony. Joan Darling received a Primetime Emmy Award nomination for directing this episode.
104	7	"The Abduction of Margaret Houlihan"	Gene Reynolds	Story by : Gene Reynolds; Teleplay by : Allan Katz & Don Reo	October 26, 1976	U-808
Colonel Flagg shows up when it seems that Margaret's been abducted while on a mission of mercy. Note – William Christopher does not appear in this episode.
105	8	"Dear Sigmund"	Alan Alda	Alan Alda	November 9, 1976	U-810
Feeling depressed, Sidney Freeman writes to Sigmund Freud about the craziness of the 4077th. Alan Alda won the Primetime Emmy and Directors Guild Awards for this episode. Alda also received a Primetime Emmy Award nomination for writing, while William Jurgensen was nominated for cinematography.
106	9	"Mulcahy's War"	George Tyne	Richard Cogan	November 16, 1976	U-812
After failing to communicate with a patient who shot himself, Father Mulcahy decides to experience life on the front lines.
107	10	"The Korean Surgeon"	Gene Reynolds	Bill Idelson	November 23, 1976	U-814
Hawkeye feels a North Korean POW (Soon-Tek Oh) who is an American-trained MD would be a fine addition to the 4077th's surgical staff. Trouble strikes in the form of two North Korean infiltrators (Robert Ito, Larry Hama).
108	11	"Hawkeye Get Your Gun"	William Jurgensen	Story by : Gene Reynolds & Jay Folb; Teleplay by : Jay Folb	November 30, 1976	U-813
Hawkeye and Potter must assist a Korean hospital near the front. Jay Folb and Gene Reynolds received a Writers Guild Award nomination for this episode. Note – Gary Burghoff and William Christopher do not appear in this episode.
109	12	"The Colonel's Horse"	Burt Metcalfe	Jim Fritzell and Everett Greenbaum	December 7, 1976	U-811
While Potter's in Tokyo, both his mare and Margaret get sick. B.J. calls his father-in-law to ask for advice, for Potter's mare, and Hawkeye operates on Margaret who has appendicitis.
110	13	"Exorcism"	Alan Alda	Story by : Gene Reynolds & Jay Folb; Teleplay by : Jay Folb	December 14, 1976	U-815
A rash of bad luck befalls the camp after Potter orders the removal of a post that the villagers believe is warding off evil spirits.
111	14	"Hawk's Nightmare"	Burt Metcalfe	Burt Prelutsky	December 21, 1976	U-804
Sidney returns to the 4077th when Hawkeye starts having nightmares.
112	15	"The Most Unforgettable Characters"	Burt Metcalfe	Ken Levine & David Isaacs	January 4, 1977	U-818
Radar takes a correspondence course in creative writing. Timeline June 11, 1953
113	16	"38 Across"	Burt Metcalfe	Jim Fritzell & Everett Greenbaum	January 11, 1977	U-821
Hawkeye calls a Navy buddy for help in finishing a crossword puzzle.
114	17	"Ping Pong"	William Jurgensen	Sid Dorfman	January 18, 1977	U-817
Hawkeye and B.J. support a Korean ping-pong champion. The staff arranges a wedding for him and his fiancée, which everyone attends. Frank doesn't approve and threatens them with General Harrelson, but Margaret tells him to shut up. Potter risks an old friendship for the sake of his beliefs.
115	18	"End Run"	Harry Morgan	John D. Hess	January 25, 1977	U-816
Radar tries to help a former college football star (Henry Brown) deal with the loss of his leg.
116	19	"Hanky Panky"	Gene Reynolds	Gene Reynolds	February 1, 1977	U-822
Margaret worries for her hospitalized fiancé, while B.J. gets close to a nurse who just received a "Dear Jane" letter. Note – William Christopher does not appear in this episode.
117	20	"Hepatitis"	Alan Alda	Alan Alda	February 8, 1977	U-823
The 4077th springs into action when Father Mulcahy (William Christopher) has a case of hepatitis, while Hawkeye develops a backache after receiving news about a doctor from back home. This episode was inspired by Christopher's own serious bout of hepatitis, which kept him out of multiple episodes.
118	21	"The General's Practitioner"	Alan Rafkin	Burt Prelutsky	February 15, 1977	U-807
A general is determined to take Hawkeye on as his personal physician, while a GI about to be shipped home (Larry Wilcox) asks Radar to look after his Korean wife and their son.
119	22	"Movie Tonight"	Burt Metcalfe	Gene Reynolds, Don Reo, Allan Katz and Jay Folb	February 22, 1977	U-824
Potter presents My Darling Clementine, a 1946 Western film, to boost morale at the 4077th, but the audience proves to be rowdier than the cowboys in the movie. The staff has a sing-a-long to "Gee, Mom, I Wanna Go Home" during a break in the film.
120	23	"Souvenirs"	Joshua Shelley	Story by : Burt Prelutsky and Reinhold Weege; Teleplay by : Burt Prelutsky	March 1, 1977	U-819
Hawkeye and B.J. conspire against a helicopter pilot who's selling souvenirs at the expense of Korean children. Featuring Brian Dennehy as an M.P. Note – Gary Burghoff does not appear in this episode.
121	24	"Post Op"	Gene Reynolds	Story by : Gene Reynolds & Jay Folb; Teleplay by : Ken Levine & David Isaacs	March 8, 1977	U-825
During a busy surgical shift, the staff must deal with a blood shortage in the OR and assorted crises in the post-op ward. Note – Gary Burghoff and William Christopher do not appear in this episode.
122	25	"Margaret's Marriage"	Gene Reynolds	Everett Greenbaum & Jim Fritzell	March 15, 1977	U-820
Margaret feels eight months is long enough to be engaged so she and Donald decide to get married right away. Note – This is Larry Linville's final episode.
