= M*A*S*H season 6 =

M*A*S*H
- Season 6
- No. of episodes: 25

Release
- Original network: CBS
- Original release: September 20, 1977 – March 27, 1978

Season chronology
- ← Previous; Season 5 Next → Season 7

The sixth season of M*A*S*H aired Tuesdays at 9:00-9:30PM from September 20, 1977 to January 24, 1978 and Mondays at the same time from January 30 to March 27, 1978.

== Cast ==
- Alan Alda as Capt. Benjamin Franklin "Hawkeye" Pierce
- Mike Farrell as Capt. B.J. Hunnicutt
- Harry Morgan as Col. Sherman T. Potter
- Loretta Swit as Maj. Margaret Houlihan
- David Ogden Stiers as Maj. Charles Emerson Winchester III
- Gary Burghoff as Cpl. Walter "Radar" O'Reilly
- Jamie Farr as Cpl. Maxwell Q. Klinger
- William Christopher as Lt. Father Francis Mulcahy

== Episodes ==
No. overall	No. in season	Title (Note: Titles taken from DVD)	Directed by (Note: Credits from episode title cards)	Written by	Original release date	Prod. code (Note: Production Code from end credits)
123	1	"Fade Out, Fade In"	Hy Averback	Jim Fritzell & Everett Greenbaum	September 20, 1977	Y-101
124	2	"Fade Out, Fade In"	Hy Averback	Jim Fritzell & Everett Greenbaum	September 20, 1977	Y-102
The 4077th acquires Maj. Charles Emerson Winchester III as a replacement surgeon when Frank does not return from R&R. Margaret returns from her honeymoon in a bad mood. Frank (off screen) is later transferred to a Veteran's Hospital in Indiana and promoted to Lieutenant Colonel. This is the first episode featuring David Ogden Stiers as Maj. Charles Emerson Winchester III. Jim Fritzell and Everett Greenbaum received a Writers Guild Award nomination for this episode. Guest stars Rick Hurst and Robert Symonds (who plays Colonel Horace Baldwin, who sends Winchester from Tokyo to Korea and will play the character again, as a lieutenant colonel, in the season 9 episode "No Laughing Matter").
125	3	"Fallen Idol"	Alan Alda	Alan Alda	September 27, 1977	Y-104
Hawkeye blames himself for Radar getting wounded, then lashes out at him. Alan Alda received a Primetime Emmy Award nomination for writing this episode.
126	4	"Last Laugh"	Don Weis	Everett Greenbaum & Jim Fritzell	October 4, 1977	Y-103
James Cromwell guest stars as an old friend of B.J.'s who plays a practical joke on him. Note – David Ogden Stiers does not appear in this episode.
127	5	"War of Nerves"	Alan Alda	Alan Alda	October 11, 1977	Y-106
Sidney returns to the 4077th as a casualty, but stays a little longer when personal clashes jeopardize morale at the camp. Guest Star Michael O'Keefe
128	6	"The Winchester Tapes"	Burt Metcalfe	Everett Greenbaum & Jim Fritzell	October 18, 1977	Y-107
Charles records a message to his parents describing the antics of the 4077th.
129	7	"The Light That Failed"	Charles Dubin	Burt Prelutsky	October 25, 1977	Y-108
The members of the 4077th read "The Rooster Crowed at Midnight" by Abigail Porterfield, a murder mystery by candlelight due to a shortage of light bulbs, but find that the last page — with the solution to the crime — is missing. Also, Charles administers the wrong medicine to a patient in the poor lighting and Hawkeye and B.J. both give him a piece of their mind. Note – Gary Burghoff does not appear in this episode.
130	8	"In Love and War"	Alan Alda	Alan Alda	November 1, 1977	Y-112
Hawkeye falls for a Korean aristocrat who's helping refugees, while Margaret suspects Donald of cheating on her. Kieu Chinh was a famous actress and talk-show host in South Vietnam before the country collapsed in 1975. Note – Gary Burghoff does not appear in this episode.
131	9	"Change Day"	Don Weis	Laurence Marks	November 8, 1977	Y-113
Hawkeye and B.J. try to foil Charles' scheme to get rich off an upcoming scrip exchange at the base, while Klinger surprises everyone by taking the entrance exam for West Point. Note – Gary Burghoff does not appear in this episode.
132	10	"Images"	Burt Metcalfe	Burt Prelutsky	November 15, 1977	Y-105
Margaret tries to kick a soft-hearted nurse (Susan Blanchard) out of the Army until an accident on the compound exposes her own soft side; a heavily-tattooed patient inspires Radar to consider getting a tattoo himself.
133	11	"The M*A*S*H Olympics"	Don Weis	Ken Levine & David Isaacs	November 22, 1977	Y-111
To get the 4077th fit, Potter organizes the M*A*S*H Olympics with Hawkeye and B.J. as captains of two teams and Margaret's visiting husband Donald to stand in on B.J.'s team. Notes – Gary Burghoff does not appear in this episode. Events of the episode take place during the 1952 Summer Olympics.
134	12	"The Grim Reaper"	George Tyne	Burt Prelutsky	November 29, 1977	Y-110
Hawkeye is furious at a colonel, aptly named Bloodworth (Charles Aidman), who seems to enjoy predicting casualties. But then he becomes a patient and witnesses Hawkeye's skills. Charles and Margaret get food poisoning from eating canned pheasant. Klinger bonds with a patient from his hometown. Note – Gary Burghoff does not appear in this episode.
135	13	"Comrades in Arms: Part 1"	Burt Metcalfe and Alan Alda	Alan Alda	December 6, 1977	Y-116
The 4077th starts to worry when Hawkeye and Margaret get lost in enemy territory on the way to another M*A*S*H unit. Burt Metcalfe and Alan Alda were nominated for Primetime Emmy and Directors Guild Awards for this episode. Note – Gary Burghoff does not appear in this episode.
136	14	"Comrades in Arms: Part 2"	Alan Alda and Burt Metcalfe	Alan Alda	December 13, 1977	Y-117
A harrowing night in enemy territory brings Hawkeye and Margaret into each other's arms, but it doesn't take long for them to drive each other crazy. Note – Gary Burghoff does not appear in this episode.
137	15	"The Merchant of Korea"	William Jurgensen	Ken Levine & David Isaacs	December 20, 1977	Y-118
When payday is delayed, B.J. and Hawkeye become indebted to Charles. So they challenge him to a poker game to win it back.
138	16	"The Smell of Music"	Stuart Millar	Jim Fritzell & Everett Greenbaum	January 3, 1978	Y-115
Hawkeye and B.J. go to extremes to get Charles off the French horn, particularly by not bathing. Meanwhile, Col. Potter keeps a suicide watch on a patient with a facial wound. Note – Gary Burghoff does not appear in this episode.
139	17	"Patent 4077"	Harry Morgan	Ken Levine & David Isaacs	January 10, 1978	Y-114
Hawkeye turns to a local merchant (Keye Luke) for a special surgical clamp, while Margaret tries to find her wedding ring. Note – Gary Burghoff does not appear in this episode.
140	18	"Tea and Empathy"	Don Weis	Bill Idelson	January 17, 1978	Y-109
Penicillin is stolen while wounded British soldiers are being treated in the OR and Hawkeye clashes with the regiment's commander (Bernard Fox). B.J. must contend with a private who has become addicted to morphine. Note – Gary Burghoff does not appear in this episode.
141	19	"Your Hit Parade"	George Tyne	Ronny Graham	January 24, 1978	Y-124
A stack of records arrives in camp and Radar becomes a DJ by playing them over the P.A. system to calm everyone's nerves during a long OR session. Meanwhile, with the many casualties taking up space around the compound, Charles struggles to find a place to sleep. Gribble, a drunk and trypanophobic sergeant (played by episode writer Ronny Graham), is coerced by Hawkeye and B.J. into giving his blood in a blood transfusion.
142	20	"What's Up, Doc?"	George Tyne	Larry Balmagia	January 30, 1978	Y-119
Margaret confides to Hawkeye that she might be pregnant, and they perform surgery on Radar's pet rabbit Fluffy in order to perform a rabbit test. At the same time, a wounded soldier and art major named Lieutenant Martinson (Charles Frank) tries to obtain a chopper so he can return home to Ohio, taking Charles hostage at gunpoint in order for his demands to be met.
143	21	"Mail Call Three"	Charles Dubin	Everett Greenbaum & Jim Fritzell	February 6, 1978	Y-121
A third batch of mail from home brings Hawkeye a letter meant for another Benjamin Pierce and unsettling news for others in the camp.
144	22	"Temporary Duty"	Burt Metcalfe	Larry Balmagia	February 13, 1978	Y-125
A boorish doctor (George Lindsey) and a fun-loving nurse (Marcia Rodd) — who is a longtime friend of Margaret's — from the 8063rd are sent to the 4077th for temporary duty as part of an exchange program.
145	23	"Potter's Retirement"	William Jurgensen	Laurence Marks	February 20, 1978	Y-120
Potter considers retirement when someone within his camp files critical reports about his command. George Wyner guests.
146	24	"Dr. Winchester and Mr. Hyde"	Charles Dubin	Ken Levine & David Isaacs and Ronny Graham	February 27, 1978	Y-122
Charles gets hooked on pep pills while Radar challenges some wounded Marines to a mouse race.
147	25	"Major Topper"	Charles Dubin	Allyn Freeman	March 27, 1978	Y-123
Klinger welcomes a new guy (Hamilton Camp) who's crazier than he is, while the surgeons have to use sugar pills as a placebo when the only morphine they have is suspected to be toxic. In addition, Hawkeye and B.J. try to match Charles tall story for tall story, only for the latter to beat them at every turn.
