= No Dessert, Dad, till You Mow the Lawn =

1994 film directed by Howard McCain

- Directed by: Howard McCain
- Written by: Jennifer Moran; Martha Moran
- Starring: Robert Hays; Joanna Kerns
- Release date: July 27, 1994
- Running time: 89 minutes
- Language: English

No Dessert Dad, till You Mow the Lawn is a 1994 American comedy film directed by Howard McCain and starring Robert Hays and Joanna Kerns.

== Synopsis ==
Two parents (Hays and Kerns) buy self-hypnosis tapes in order to quit smoking. The kids find the tapes and add subliminal suggestions that turn them into cool parents.

== Cast ==
- Robert Hays as Ken Cochran, the executive at Cantaloupe
- Joanna Kerns as Carol Cochran, Ken's wife
- Joshua Schaefer as Justin Cochran, Ken & Carol's second son
- Larry Linville as J.J., Ken's boss and the CEO of Cantaloupe
- Allison Mack as Monica Cochran, Ken & Carol's daughter
- Jimmy Marsden as Tyler Cochran, Ken & Carol's first son
- Richard Moll as Boot Camp Sergeant
- Lyman Ward as Larry Driscoll, Ken's corrupt commanding officer
- Corbin Allred as Moonpie
- Michael James McDonald as Evil Hypnotist
- Heather Campbell as Enemy Player
- Ted Davis as Vaneet

== Reception ==
In a negative review, Paul Cullum wrote, "No Dessert Dad adheres strictly to the point of view built into the title--that of kids goofing on short-sighted oblivious parents--but the meandering narrative creates the feeling of something made up as it goes along, much as a four-year-old might tell a story. This, coupled with largely infantile humor, leaves the queasy but vivid impression that this is a film written not only for kids, but quite possibly by kids. None of this will is likely dissuade the post-linear, computer-driven, cybergarten audience, but it promises to be slow going for anyone over the age of 10."

Radio Times had a negative review of the film, stating, "This rare foray by producer Roger Corman into PG territory is a surprisingly reprehensible family film. ... Though the premise may not bother children, they might share their parents' discomfort, not just at the film's cold tone, but also its attempts to find humour in cat faeces and cracks about incest. Bruce Elder of The Sydney Morning Herald praised the film, calling it "cute fantasy" and "mildly amusing". Mick Martin and Marsha Porter gave the film three stars, saying about the film's parents, "Watching their transformation from strung-out chain-smokers to vibrant, healthy parents is both funny and poignant." Stan James of The Advertiser wrote that the film was "a certain winner in a strange title competition" and "This harmless fare has its moments, some of them funny."
