= M*A*S*H season 7 =

M*A*S*H
- Season 7
- No. of episodes: 26

Release
- Original network: CBS
- Original release: September 18, 1978 – March 12, 1979

Season chronology
- ← Previous; Season 6 Next → Season 8

The seventh season of M*A*S*H premiered on September 18, 1978 and concluded its 26-episode season on March 12, 1979. This season aired Mondays at 9:00–9:30 pm on CBS.

== Cast ==
- Alan Alda as Capt. Benjamin Franklin "Hawkeye" Pierce
- Mike Farrell as Capt. B.J. Hunnicutt
- Harry Morgan as Col. Sherman T. Potter
- Loretta Swit as Maj. Margaret Houlihan
- David Ogden Stiers as Maj. Charles Emerson Winchester III
- Gary Burghoff as Cpl. Walter "Radar" O'Reilly
- Jamie Farr as Cpl. Maxwell Q. Klinger
- William Christopher as Lt. Father Francis Mulcahy

== Episodes ==
No. overall	No. in season	Title (Note: Titles taken from DVD)	Directed by (Note: Credits from episode title cards)	Written by	Original release date	Prod. code (Note: Production Code from end credits)
148	1	"Commander Pierce"	Burt Metcalfe	Story by : Ronny Graham and Don Segall; Teleplay by : Ronny Graham	September 18, 1978	T-404
With Potter in Seoul and Charles incapacitated, Hawkeye takes command of the 4077th — and soon learns how difficult it is to be in charge. This is the first episode featuring a mustachioed B.J. Hunnicutt, which he will keep for the remainder of the series.
149	2	"Peace on Us"	George Tyne	Ken Levine & David Isaacs	September 25, 1978	T-401
Hawkeye takes matters into his own hands when peace talks break down. This was the episode in which B. J. grows his mustache. Featuring Kevin Hagen of Little House on the Prairie.
150	3	"Lil"	Burt Metcalfe	Sheldon Bull	October 2, 1978	T-406
Radar fears Colonel Potter's friendship with a visiting Nurse Colonel may be inappropriate. Starring Carmen Mathews as Col. Lilian "Lil" Rayborn. Klinger gives the date as September 10.
151	4	"Our Finest Hour"	Burt Metcalfe	Ken Levine & David Isaacs; Larry Balmagia & Ronny Graham; David Lawrence	October 9, 1978	T-408
152	5	"Our Finest Hour"	Burt Metcalfe	Ken Levine & David Isaacs; Larry Balmagia & Ronny Graham; David Lawrence	October 9, 1978	T-409
An hour-long clip show (split for syndication): A newsreel correspondent (Clete Roberts) interviews the characters about life at the 4077th. The new footage for this episode was filmed in black and white, while the clips from past episodes — which include Henry Blake, Trapper John McIntyre, and Frank Burns — are in their original color. The interviewer states the date is October 9, 1952.
153	6	"The Billfold Syndrome"	Alan Alda	Ken Levine & David Isaacs	October 16, 1978	T-405
Charles gives everyone the silent treatment, while Sidney is summoned to speak to a shell-shocked medic who has forgotten his own identity. Stanley Tischer and Larry L. Mills received Primetime Emmy and ACE Eddie Award nominations for editing this episode.
154	7	"None Like it Hot"	Tony Mordente	Ken Levine & David Isaacs and Johnny Bonaduce	October 23, 1978	T-410
During a heat wave, Hawkeye and B.J. get a portable bathtub, Klinger tries to sweat his way out of the Army, and Radar needs a tonsillectomy.
155	8	"They Call the Wind Korea"	Charles Dubin	Ken Levine & David Isaacs	October 30, 1978	T-407
A gale from Manchuria produces multiple injuries which tie down all the doctors — including Charles, who is stranded at an accident site en route to R&R in Seoul and has only Klinger to assist him.
156	9	"Major Ego"	Alan Alda	Larry Balmagia	November 6, 1978	T-412
Charles' ego inflates when a reporter comes to the 4077th to do a story about him after he saves a life in the OR. Note – Gary Burghoff does not appear in this episode.
157	10	"Baby, It's Cold Outside"	George Tyne	Gary David Goldberg	November 13, 1978	T-403
During a cold snap, Charles makes everyone jealous with his winter coat, while Hawkeye must treat a patient with severe hypothermia and Klinger loses his hearing in a land mine explosion. Gary David Goldberg won the Writers Guild Award for this episode.
158	11	"Point of View"	Charles Dubin	Ken Levine & David Isaacs	November 20, 1978	T-415
The 4077th is seen from the perspective of a Private Rich, who is brought in for throat surgery after being wounded by shrapnel. A foul-tempered Colonel Potter admits to Rich that he forgot to call Mildred on their anniversary; Rich later passes the message to Hawkeye, who gets Radar to call Mildred so she and Potter can talk. The episode has no laugh track. Charles Dubin received Primetime Emmy and Directors Guild Award nominations for this episode, while Ken Levine and David Isaacs received Primetime Emmy and Writers Guild Award nominations.
159	12	"Dear Comrade"	Charles Dubin	Tom Reeder	November 27, 1978	T-413
Charles' new houseboy (Sab Shimono) is actually a North Korean spy sent to discover the secret of the 4077th's success in medicine. Note – Gary Burghoff does not appear in this episode.
160	13	"Out of Gas"	Mel Damski	Tom Reeder	December 4, 1978	T-411
Father Mulcahy volunteers to deal with black marketeers when the camp runs short of sodium pentothal anesthetic.
161	14	"An Eye for a Tooth"	Charles Dubin	Ronny Graham	December 11, 1978	T-414
Father Mulcahy is unhappy about not being promoted, while Hawkeye and B.J. start a prank war with Charles and Margaret using a visiting chopper pilot's counterweight dummy. Note – Gary Burghoff does not appear in this episode.
162	15	"Dear Sis"	Alan Alda	Alan Alda	December 18, 1978	T-417
Father Mulcahy writes to his sister at Christmas about feeling useless at the 4077th, but his deeds convince him otherwise.
163	16	"B.J. Papa San"	James Sheldon	Larry Balmagia	January 1, 1979	T-402
B.J. cares for a poor Korean family, while a general is unamused by Hawkeye's bedside manner.
164	17	"Inga"	Alan Alda	Alan Alda	January 8, 1979	T-420
A female Swedish surgeon (Mariette Hartley) proves herself superior to Hawkeye and Charles — who vie for her affection. Alan Alda won the Primetime Emmy Award for writing this episode. Note – Gary Burghoff does not appear in this episode.
165	18	"The Price"	Charles Dubin	Erik Tarloff	January 15, 1979	T-418
Hawkeye and B.J. keep a Korean draft dodger hidden, while Klinger tries to bribe his way out of the Army and Potter's mare disappears.
166	19	"The Young and the Restless"	William Jurgensen	Mitch Markowitz	January 22, 1979	T-421
The surgeons of the 4077th, particularly Charles and Potter, are envious of a brilliant youngster who bruises their egos. Mitch Markowitz received a Writers Guild Award nomination for this episode.
167	20	"Hot Lips is Back in Town"	Charles Dubin	Story by : Bernard Dilbert and Gary Markowitz; Teleplay by : Larry Balmagia and Bernard Dilbert	January 29, 1979	T-419
Margaret gets divorced from Donald, while Radar tries to assert himself with an attractive young nurse.
168	21	"C*A*V*E"	William Jurgensen	Larry Balmagia and Ronny Graham	February 5, 1979	T-423
When the 4077th is forced to evacuate to a cave during an artillery barrage, Hawkeye wrestles with his claustrophobia and Margaret fights back her unexpected terror at loud noises. Note – Gary Burghoff does not appear in this episode.
169	22	"Rally Round the Flagg, Boys"	Harry Morgan	Mitch Markowitz	February 12, 1979	T-425
Colonel Flagg, considering Hawkeye a Communist for giving surgical priority to a wounded North Korean, presses Charles to find proof. This was Flagg's final appearance in the series.
170	23	"Preventative Medicine"	Tony Mordente	Tom Reeder	February 19, 1979	T-416
Hawkeye plots to put a visiting commanding officer with the highest casualty rate in Korea off duty while also wrestling with BJ about the ethics of the situation.
171	24	"A Night at Rosie's"	Burt Metcalfe	Ken Levine & David Isaacs	February 26, 1979	T-426
The whole camp seeks refuge at Rosie's to get away from the war. This episode marks the first of three appearances of Sergeant Jack Scully (Joshua Bryant).
172	25	"Ain't Love Grand?"	Mike Farrell	Ken Levine & David Isaacs	March 5, 1979	T-422
Klinger falls for a classy nurse while Charles tries to reform a Korean business girl at Rosie's. Note – Gary Burghoff does not appear in this episode. But Radar is mentioned
173	26	"The Party"	Burt Metcalfe	Alan Alda and Burt Metcalfe	March 12, 1979	T-424
B.J. tries to arrange a party for the staff's stateside families, amid skepticism that it'll ever happen.
