= School Spirit =

1985 film by Alan Holleb

- Theatrical release poster
- Directed by: Alan Holleb
- Written by: Geoffrey Baere
- Produced by: Ashok Amritraj; Jeff Begun
- Starring: Tom Nolan; Roberta Collins; Larry Linville
- Cinematography: Robert Ebinger
- Edited by: Sonya Sones
- Music by: Tom Bruner
- Production companies: Chroma III Productions; Amritraj
- Distributed by: Concorde Pictures
- Release date: October 25, 1985
- Running time: 90 minutes
- Country: United States
- Language: English

School Spirit is a 1985 American supernatural sex comedy film directed by Alan Holleb, and starring Tom Nolan, Roberta Collins, and Larry Linville. It follows a college student who is killed in a car accident and returns as a ghost to haunt his school.

It was one of the first films from Roger Corman's new distribution company, Concorde Pictures, along with films like Barbarian Queen, Loose Screws, Cocaine Wars, and Wheels of Fire. Corman said he had to form his own distribution company because the owners of New World Pictures — which he sold — refused to distribute this and Wheels of Fire.

== Plot ==
A college student gets into a car crash and becomes a special kind of ghost who can make himself invisible or corporeal at will. He takes advantage of his powers to pursue his fellow female students, during the infamous "Hog Day".

== Cast ==
- Tom Nolan as Billy Batson
- Danièle Arnaud as Madeleine
- Elizabeth Foxx as Judith Hightower
- John Finnegan as Pinky Batson
- Larry Linville as President Grimshaw
- Roberta Collins as Helen Grimshaw
- Marta Kober as Ursula Grimshaw
- Nick Segal as Gregg
- Frank Mugavero as Lasky
- Toni Hudson as Rita

== Production ==
The film was based on an idea of Geoffrey Bare called College Ghost about a campus Casanova who comes back as a ghost to help a nerd get laid. He pitched it unsuccessfully, but director Allan Holleb felt it had possibilities. They adjusted the script and ended up selling it to Roger Corman, who had worked with Holleb on Candy Stripe Nurses. Corman agreed to help make the film. Holleb says one of his inspirations was the Italian film Il Sorpasso (1962).

Some of the finance came from a consortium of Indian doctors. It had been arranged by Ashok Amritraj, who became a successful producer.

Scenes at college were filmed at a veterans' hospital in Brentwood.

The special effects were done in the style of old Topper movies due to the low budget.

== Release ==
School Spirit was released on October 25, 1985 in Pennsylvania.

== Reception ==
The Philadelphia Daily News called it "an affably low-rent soft-core item that dares to tackle such compelling subjects as life, death, mortality, morality and overaged schoolgirls who like to flex their mammary glands."

The Los Angeles Times called it a "vulgar, ugly looking little film of no visual distinction or ambition."

The Philadelphia Inquirer critic wrote, "By my count, there are 37 naked female breasts in the movie... (one aspiring actress appears only in profile; she must have a bad agent). I mention this because there's really no other reason for the movie to exist. There are no hot sex scenes, no terrific new jokes, no remotely funny performances. Just jiggle, jiggle, jiggle... a cheapo, one-gimmick teen sex comedy that's so thin and so exploitative that it couldn't even interest a minor distribution company."

== See also ==
- List of ghost films

== Sources ==
- Borseti, Francesco (2016). It Came from the 80s!: Interviews with 124 Cult Filmmakers. Jefferson, North Carolina: McFarland & Company. ISBN 978-1-476-66604-4.
- Toga Party: The Official Soy Boy Podcast (October 24, 2016). "Toga Party 80 - School Spirit" (Podcast).
