= Dear Sigmund =

- M*A*S*H episode
- Episode no.: Season 5 Episode 8
- Directed by: Alan Alda
- Written by: Alan Alda
- Production code: U-810
- Original air date: September 18, 1976

Episode chronology
← Previous "The Abduction of Margaret Houlihan"	Next → "Mulcahy's War"
- M*A*S*H season 5

"Dear Sigmund" is the 8th episode of the fifth season of the television series M*A*S*H. It first aired on CBS on September 18, 1976. The episode was conceived, written and directed by cast member Alan Alda, who played Hawkeye Pierce on the show.

== Plot ==
Psychiatrist Sidney Freedman (Allan Arbus) is having trouble working after one of his patients, whom he thought he had helped, dies by suicide. He believes "there's something special" about the 4077th, so he goes to a poker game there one night and decides to remain for several weeks, to work through his feelings.

During his time there, he writes a letter addressed to the deceased Sigmund Freud. In the letter, he describes the members of the 4077th and recalls stories about them; for instance, Klinger pretends to have been hit in the head by a helicopter blade and speaks only Arabic, Hawkeye Pierce deals with a bomber pilot who needs to learn the consequences of war, and Radar processes the accidental death of an ambulance driver, including writing a letter to the dead man's parents. The main 'action' during the camp's downtime is when people are victimized by an unknown practical joker. B.J. Hunnicutt turns out to be the joker; at one point, he fills Frank Burns' air raid bunker with water, coats the eyepieces of Colonel Potter's binoculars with black ink and enlists Sidney's help by having him shout "Air raid!" to lure Frank into the trap.

Revitalized, Sidney ultimately departs the 4077th, realizing that happiness is "like springtime at MASH. If you can't see it or find it, you just go ahead and make it", and he's "coaxing a little bud to grow" inside himself. As he drives off, he finds himself the latest target of B.J.'s jokes.

== Production ==
Alda was a regular writer for the program, as well as a cast member. He had long been impressed by Arbus's acting skills as a psychiatrist, initially believing him to be a subject expert and turning to him for psychiatric advice. The pair's friendship continued past the end of M*A*S*H's run.

When Alda first told producer Gene Reynolds about his idea for the episode, Reynolds warned him that "if you ask an actor to play depressed, it'll be depressing for the audience". As a result, Alda made sure when writing the script that Freedman was cheerful on the outside and that his depression remained beneath the surface.

After the series concluded, Alda described the episode as one of his favorites.

== Reception ==
Alan Alda won two awards for the episode: the Directors Guild of America's Award for Outstanding Directing in a Comedy Series in 1976 and the Primetime Emmy Award for Outstanding Directing for a Comedy Series in 1977. Alda was also nominated for an Emmy for Outstanding Writing for a Comedy Series in 1977; William Jurgensen was nominated for an Emmy for Outstanding Cinematography. Samuel E. Beetley and Stanford Tischler were nominated for an Emmy for Outstanding Film Editing in a Comedy Series and for an American Cinema Editors' "Eddie Award" in Editing.

In a retrospective review in 2005, Alun Thorne of Birmingham Post praised the episode as the fifth season's highlight. Thorne lauded the "sheer blackness", fitting in with the series' themes of "the human condition and the horrors of war", and the "genuinely heart-breaking" letter to a deceased ambulance driver's family, as well as a "brilliantly written and beautifully delivered" joke in the opening scene.
