= John Finnegan (actor) =

American actor (1926–2012)

John P. Finnegan
- Publicity Photo of John Finnegan
- Born: August 18, 1926; New York City, New York, U.S.
- Died: July 29, 2012 (aged 85); Palm Desert, California, U.S.
- Occupation: Actor
- Years active: 1970–2004
- Spouse(s): Carolynn Jacobs Finnegan (2nd wife, 1992–2012; his death)

John P. "J.P." Finnegan (August 18, 1926 – July 29, 2012) was an American film and television actor, mostly known for his recurring role on the American crime fiction series Columbo. He voiced the villainous character Warren T. Rat in the Don Bluth’s 1986 film An American Tail.

A friend of director/actor John Cassavetes, Finnegan appeared in five of his films, including A Woman Under the Influence (1974), Gloria (1980) and Big Trouble (1986), which also starred Columbo star Peter Falk. He also appeared in Heroes (1977), The Natural (1984), School Spirit (1985), Big Man on Campus (1989) and Come See the Paradise (1990), and portrayed Judge Edward A. Haggerty in Oliver Stone's JFK (1991).

== Background ==
One of 11 children born to Irish immigrant parents, Finnegan served in the United States Navy during World War II. He became friends with Cassavetes and Falk at the Actors Studio in his native New York City. They helped Finnegan in the early 1950s, when he moved to Los Angeles.

Finnegan died on July 29, 2012, at his home in Palm Desert, California from complications of pneumonia, aged 85.

== Partial filmography ==
- Play It as It Lays (1972) - Frank
- A Woman Under the Influence (1974) - Clancy
- Capone (1975) - N.Y. Police Lt.

Columbo, season 3 Episode 8,

- The Killing of a Chinese Bookie (1976) - Taxi Driver
- Nickelodeon (1976) - Kathleen's Director
- Heroes (1977) - Mr. Munro
- Opening Night (1977) - Bobby
- Bloodbrothers (1978) - Bartender
- The In-Laws (1979) - Deliveryman #1
- Little Miss Marker (1980) - Casino Clerk
- Gloria (1980) - Frank
- Love Streams (1984) - Taxi Driver
- The Natural (1984) - Sam Simpson
- The Journey of Natty Gann (1985) - Logging Boss
- School Spirit (1985) - Pinky Batson
- Big Trouble (1986) - Det. Murphy
- An American Tail (1986) - Warren T. Rat (voice)
- The Law & Harry McGraw (1986) - Lester - Episode: "Harry Does the Hustle"
- Spellbinder (1988) - George (uncredited)
- Big Man on Campus (1989) - Judge Ferguson
- The Last of the Finest (1990) - Tommy Grogan
- Come See the Paradise (1990) - Brennan
- JFK (1991) - Judge Haggerty
- Last Action Hero (1993) - Watch Commande
- Columbo - S10 E10 (1995)
- Mars Attacks! (1996) - Speaker of the House
- Vegas Vacation (1997) - Arty, the Hoover Dam Guide
- The Independent (2000) - Guard
