= Larry Gelbart =

American comedy writer and playwright (1928–2009)

- Born: Larry Simon Gelbart; February 25, 1928; Chicago, Illinois, U.S.
- Died: September 11, 2009 (aged 81); Beverly Hills, California, U.S.
- Resting place: Hillside Memorial Park Cemetery, Culver City, California
- Other names: Francis Burns, Elsig
- Occupations: TV writer; author; playwright; screenwriter; director
- Years active: 1944–2009
- Spouse: Patricia Marshall (m. 1956)
- Children: 5
- Military career
- Allegiance: United States
- Branch: United States Army
- Rank: Sergeant
- Unit: Armed Forces Radio Service
- Conflicts: World War II

Signature
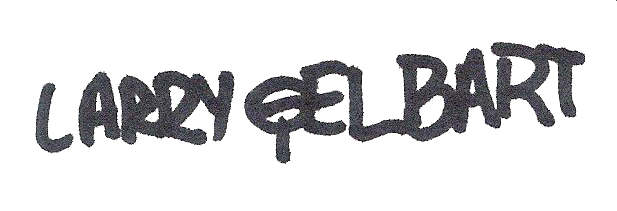

Larry Simon Gelbart (February 25, 1928 – September 11, 2009) was an American television writer, playwright, screenwriter, director and author, most famous as a creator and producer of the television series M*A*S*H, and as co-writer of the Broadway musicals A Funny Thing Happened on the Way to the Forum and City of Angels.

== Biography ==
=== Early life ===
Gelbart was born in Chicago, Illinois, to Jewish immigrants Harry Gelbart, "a barber since his half of a childhood in Latvia," and Frieda Sturner, from what is now Dąbrowa Górnicza (Poland), who migrated to the United States. Larry Gelbart had a sister, Marcia Gelbart Walkenstein.

His family later moved to Los Angeles and he attended Fairfax High School. Drafted into the U.S. Army near the end of World War II, Gelbart worked for the Armed Forces Radio Service in Los Angeles. Attaining the rank of sergeant, Gelbart was honorably discharged after serving 1 year and 11 days. Those last 11 days prevented Gelbart from being drafted for service during the Korean War.

=== Television ===
Gelbart began as a writer at the age of sixteen for Danny Thomas's radio show after his father, who was Thomas's barber, showed Thomas some jokes Gelbart had written. During the 1940s Gelbart also wrote for Jack Paar and Bob Hope. In the 1950s, his most important work in television involved writing for Red Buttons, Sid Caesar on Caesar's Hour, and in Celeste Holm's Honestly, Celeste!, as well as with writers Mel Tolkin, Michael Stewart, Selma Diamond, Neil Simon, Mel Brooks, Carl Reiner and Woody Allen on two Caesar specials.

In 1972, Gelbart was one of the main forces behind the creation of the television series M*A*S*H, writing the pilot (for which he received a "Developed for Television by __" credit); then producing, often writing and occasionally directing the series for its first four seasons, from 1972 to 1976. M*A*S*H earned Gelbart a Peabody Award and an Emmy for Outstanding Comedy Series and went on to considerable commercial and critical success.

=== Films ===
Gelbart's best known screen work is perhaps the screenplay for 1982's Tootsie, which he co-wrote with Murray Schisgal. He was nominated for an Academy Award for that script, and also was Oscar-nominated for his adapted screenplay for 1977's Oh, God! starring John Denver and George Burns. On his relationship with actor Dustin Hoffman in Tootsie, Gelbart is reported to have said, "Never work with an Oscar-winner who is shorter than the statue". He later retracted this statement, saying it was just a joke.

He collaborated with Burt Shevelove on the screenplay for the 1966 British film The Wrong Box. Gelbart also co-wrote the golden-era film spoof Movie Movie (1978) starring George C. Scott in dual roles, the racy comedy Blame It on Rio (1984) starring Michael Caine and the 2000 remake of Bedazzled with Elizabeth Hurley and Brendan Fraser. His script for Rough Cut (1980), a caper film starring Burt Reynolds, Lesley-Anne Down and David Niven, was credited under the pseudonym Francis Burns.

Gelbart-scripted films for television included Barbarians at the Gate (1993), a true story about the battle for control of the RJR Nabisco corporation starring James Garner that was based on the best-selling book of that name; the original comedy Weapons of Mass Distraction (1997) starring Ben Kingsley and Gabriel Byrne as rival media moguls; and And Starring Pancho Villa as Himself (2003) starring Antonio Banderas as the Mexican revolutionary leader.

=== Broadway ===
Gelbart co-wrote the long-running Broadway musical farce A Funny Thing Happened on the Way to the Forum with Burt Shevelove and Stephen Sondheim in 1962. After the show received poor reviews and box-office returns during its previews in Washington, D.C., rewrites and restaging helped; it was a smash Broadway hit and ran for 964 performances. Its book won a Tony Award. In a 1991 published edition of the musical, Gelbart wrote "it remains for me the best piece of work I've been lucky enough to see my name on." A film version starring Zero Mostel and directed by Richard Lester, was released in 1966. Gelbart was critical of the movie, as most of his and Shevelove's libretto was largely rewritten.

Gelbart's other Broadway credits include the musical City of Angels, which won him the Drama Desk Award for Outstanding Book of a Musical, the Tony Award for Best Book of a Musical, and an Edgar Award and an off-Broadway musical, In The Beginning, a satirical take on the Bible, with music and lyrics by Maury Yeston. He also wrote the Iran-Contra satire Mastergate, as well as Sly Fox and a musical adaptation of the Preston Sturges movie Hail the Conquering Hero, whose grueling development inspired Gelbart to utter what evolved into the classic quip, "If Hitler is alive, I hope he's out of town with a musical."

=== Memoirs ===
In 1997, Gelbart published his memoir, Laughing Matters: On Writing M*A*S*H, Tootsie, Oh, God! and a Few Other Funny Things.

=== Blogger ===
Gelbart was a contributing blogger at The Huffington Post, and also was a regular participant on the alt.tv.mash Usenet newsgroup as "Elsig". (His user name was derived from El for Larry, si for Simon and g for Gelbart.)

== Honors ==
In 1995, a Golden Palm Star on the Palm Springs, California, Walk of Stars was dedicated to him.

He won a Tony Award for the book of A Funny Thing Happened on the Way to the Forum.

He won a Tony Award for the book of City of Angels.

He won an Emmy Award for Outstanding Comedy Series in 1974 for M*A*S*H.

In 2002, Gelbart was inducted into the American Theatre Hall of Fame.

In 2008, he was inducted into the Television Hall of Fame.

== Death ==
Gelbart was diagnosed with cancer in June and died at his Beverly Hills home on September 11, 2009, aged 81. He was interred at the Hillside Memorial Park Cemetery in Culver City, California.

== Writing credits ==
- Duffy's Tavern (1941–1951) (Radio)
- The Red Buttons Show (1952) (TV)
- Honestly, Celeste! (1954) (TV)
- Caesar's Hour (1954–1957) (TV)
- The Patrice Munsel Show (1957) (TV)
- The Dinah Shore Chevy Show (1958) (TV)
- The Art Carney Show (1959) (TV)
- Startime (1959) (TV)
- The Best of Anything (1960) (TV)
- Hooray for Love (1960) (TV)
- A Funny Thing Happened on the Way to the Forum (with Burt Shevelove) (1962) (Theater)
- The Notorious Landlady (with Blake Edwards) (1962)
- Judy and her guests, Phil Silvers and Robert Goulet (1963) (TV)
- The Thrill of It All (1963) (story only)
- The Danny Kaye Show (1963) (TV)
- The Wrong Box (with Burt Shevelove) (1966)
- Not with My Wife, You Don't! (with Norman Panama and Peter Barnes) (1966)
- A Fine Pair (1967) (uncredited)
- Eddie (1971) (TV)
- The Marty Feldman Comedy Machine (1971) (TV)
- M*A*S*H (1972–1983) (TV) (also Co-Creator, with Gene Reynolds)
- Roll Out (1973) (TV)
- If I Love You, Am I Trapped Forever? (1974) (TV)
- Karen (1975) (TV)
- Sly Fox (1976) (Theater)
- Three's Company (1976) (TV) (unaired pilot)
- Oh God! (1977)
- Movie Movie (1978)
- United States (1980) (TV)
- Rough Cut (1980) (as Francis Burns)
- Neighbors (1981)
- Tootsie (screenplay credit with Murray Schisgal); (story credit with Don McGuire) (1982)
- AfterMASH (1983–1984) (TV) (also Creator)
- Blame it on Rio (1984) (with Charlie Peters)
- In The Beginning (1988) (with Maury Yeston) (Theater)
- City of Angels (1989) (Theater)
- Mastergate (1990) (Theater)
- Barbarians at the Gate (1993) (TV)
- Weapons of Mass Distraction (1997) (TV)
- Laughing Matters: On writing M*A*S*H, Tootsie, Oh, God! And A Few Other Funny Things (1999) (Autobiography)
- C-Scam (2000) (TV)
- Bedazzled (with Harold Ramis and Peter Tolan) (2000)
- And Starring Pancho Villa as Himself (2003) (TV)

== M*A*S*H episodes ==
The following is a list of M*A*S*H episodes (42 Total) written and/or directed by Gelbart.

=== Season one (9/17/72–3/25/73) ===
- Episode 1: The Pilot (Written)
- Episode 4: "Chief Surgeon Who?" (Written)
- Episode 11: "Germ Warfare" (Written)
- Episode 12: "Dear Dad" (Written)
- Episode 18: "Dear Dad...Again" (Written with Sheldon Keller)
- Episode 21: "Sticky Wicket" (Teleplay with Laurence Marks)
- Episode 23: "Ceasefire" (Teleplay with Laurence Marks)
- Episode 24: "Showtime" (Teleplay with Robert Klane; Story)

=== Season two (9/15/73–3/2/74) ===
- Episode 1: "Divided We Stand" (Written)
- Episode 2: "Five O'Clock Charlie" (Written with Laurence Marks & Keith Walker)
- Episode 6: "Kim" (Written with Marc Mandel & Laurence Marks)
- Episode 7: "L.I.P. (Local Indigenous Personnel)" (Written with Carl Kleinschmitt & Laurence Marks)
- Episode 9: "Dear Dad...Three" (Written with Laurence Marks)
- Episode 11: "Carry On, Hawkeye" (Written with Bernard Dilbert & Laurence Marks)
- Episode 12: "The Incubator" (Written with Laurence Marks)
- Episode 13: "Deal Me Out" (Written with Laurence Marks)
- Episode 16: "Henry in Love" (Written with Laurence Marks)
- Episode 19: "The Chosen People" (Written Laurence Marks & Sheldon Keller)
- Episode 20: "As You Were" (Written with Laurence Marks)
- Episode 21: "Crisis" (Written with Laurence Marks)
- Episode 23: "Mail Call" (Written with Laurence Marks)
- Episode 24: "A Smattering of Intelligence" (Written with Laurence Marks; Directed)

=== Season three (9/10/74–3/18/75) ===
- Episode 1: "The General Flipped at Dawn" (Directed)
- Episode 2: "Rainbow Bridge" (Written with Laurence Marks)
- Episode 4: "Iron Guts Kelly" (Written with Sid Dorfman)
- Episode 5: "O.R." (Written with Laurence Marks)
- Episode 10: "There's Nothing Like a Nurse" (Written)
- Episode 16: "Bulletin Board" (Written with Simon Muntner)
- Episode 17: "The Consultant" (Story)
- Episode 19: "Aid Station" (Written with Simon Muntner)
- Episode 23: "White Gold" (Written with Simon Muntner)
- Episode 24: "Abyssinia, Henry" (Directed)

=== Season four (9/12/75–2/24/76) ===
- Episode 1: "Welcome to Korea" (Written with Everett Greenbaum & Jim Fritzell)
- Episode 3: "It Happened One Night" (Teleplay with Simon Muntner)
- Episode 9: "Quo Vadis, Captain Chandler?" (Directed)
- Episode 13: "The Gun" (Written with Gene Reynolds)
- Episode 15: "The Price of Tomato Juice" (Written with Gene Reynolds)
- Episode 18: "Hawkeye" (Written with Simon Muntner; Directed)
- Episode 21: "Smilin' Jack" (Written with Simon Muntner)
- Episode 22: "The More I See You" (Written with Gene Reynolds)
- Episode 23: "Deluge" (Written with Simon Muntner)
- Episode 24: "The Interview" (Written and Directed)

== Bibliography ==
- Isenberg, Barbara. State of the Arts: California Artists Talk About Their Work. 2005
- Gelbart, Larry. Laughing Matters: On Writing MASH, Tootsie, Oh, God!, and a Few Other Funny Things. 1998
