= M*A*S*H season 8 =

Season of television series

M*A*S*H
- Season 8
- No. of episodes: 25

Release
- Original network: CBS
- Original release: September 17, 1979 – March 24, 1980

Season chronology
- ← Previous; Season 7 Next → Season 9

The eighth season of M*A*S*H premiered on September 17, 1979 and concluded its 25-episode season on March 24, 1980. Like season 7, this season aired Mondays at 9:00–9:30 pm on CBS.

== Cast ==
- Alan Alda as Capt. Benjamin Franklin "Hawkeye" Pierce
- Mike Farrell as Capt. B.J. Hunnicutt
- Harry Morgan as Col. Sherman T. Potter
- Loretta Swit as Maj. Margaret Houlihan
- David Ogden Stiers as Maj. Charles Emerson Winchester III
- Gary Burghoff as Cpl. Walter "Radar" O'Reilly (4 episodes)
- Jamie Farr as Cpl. Maxwell Q. Klinger
- William Christopher as Lt./Capt. Father Francis Mulcahy

== Episodes ==
No. overall	No. in season	Title (Note: Titles taken from DVD)	Directed by (Note: Credits from episode title cards)	Written by	Original release date	Prod. code (Note: Production Code from end credits)
174	1	"Too Many Cooks"	Charles S. Dubin	Dennis Koenig	September 17, 1979	S-601
The 4077th tries to hang on to a wounded private (Ed Begley Jr.) who is a terrible soldier but a talented chef, while a strain on Potter's marriage has him on edge. Note – Gary Burghoff makes a brief appearance in this episode.
175	2	"Are You Now, Margaret?"	Charles S. Dubin	Thad Mumford & Dan Wilcox	September 24, 1979	S-602
A visiting Congressional aide (Lawrence Pressman) alleges that Margaret is a Communist sympathizer and threatens to ruin her Army career. Thad Mumford and Dan Wilcox won the Writers Guild Award for this episode. Note – Gary Burghoff does not appear in this episode.
176	3	"Guerrilla My Dreams"	Alan Alda	Bob Colleary	October 1, 1979	S-603
A South Korean officer (Mako) harasses a wounded woman he claims to be an enemy guerrilla. Second appearance of Scully. Note – Gary Burghoff makes a brief appearance in this episode.
177	4	"Good Bye, Radar: Part 1"	Charles S. Dubin	Ken Levine & David Isaacs	October 8, 1979	S-610
The generator goes on the fritz while Radar is on R&R, so B.J. and Potter jury-rig a device to treat a patient. When Radar returns, he learns that his uncle has died, making him eligible for a hardship discharge from the Army.
178	5	"Good Bye, Radar: Part 2"	Charles S. Dubin	Ken Levine & David Isaacs	October 15, 1979	S-611
Although Radar has his discharge, the need for a new generator makes him think that the 4077th needs him more than his family does. Ken Levine and David Isaacs received Primetime Emmy and Writers Guild Award nominations for this episode. Note – This is Gary Burghoff's final appearance on the show.
179	6	"Period of Adjustment"	Charles S. Dubin	Jim Mulligan & John Rappaport	October 22, 1979	S-604
Radar's departure proves too challenging for Klinger, having a tough act to follow as company clerk; and for BJ, whose homesickness explodes when he learns his daughter called Radar 'Daddy' upon seeing him. Charles S. Dubin won the Directors Guild Award for this episode and received a Primetime Emmy Award nomination. Jim Mulligan and John Rappaport received a Writers Guild Award nomination.
180	7	"Nurse Doctor"	Charles S. Dubin	Story by : Sy Rosen; Teleplay by : Sy Rosen and Thad Mumford & Dan Wilcox	October 29, 1979	S-608
Father Mulcahy assists a nurse with her studies for medical school, but feels uneasy about her display of appreciation.
181	8	"Private Finance"	Charles S. Dubin	Dennis Koenig	November 5, 1979	S-605
A Korean woman accuses Klinger of disgracing her daughter, while Hawkeye finds it hard to keep a promise to a dying soldier.
182	9	"Mr. and Mrs. Who?"	Burt Metcalfe	Ronny Graham	November 12, 1979	S-606
A hung-over Charles tries to remember what he did while on R&R in Tokyo and learns that he may have wed an unknown woman (Claudette Nevins). His fellow staff members encounter cases of Korean hemorrhagic fever, with its particularly dangerous diuretic phase.
183	10	"The Yalu Brick Road"	Charles S. Dubin	Mike Farrell	November 19, 1979	S-607
Charles, Margaret, and Father Mulcahy find themselves looking after the whole camp when a salmonella epidemic hits after a bad Thanksgiving turkey. Hawkeye and B.J. get lost in enemy territory during a trip to get antibiotics and pick up a North Korean prisoner. First appearance of G. W. Bailey as Sgt. Rizzo.
184	11	"Life Time"	Alan Alda	Alan Alda and Walter Dishell, M.D.	November 26, 1979	S-609
The surgeons race against time to save a soldier with a lacerated aorta. The majority of this episode happens in real time after Pierce announces a deadline of 20 minutes they have to save a patient from paralysis. An analog clock, established as the clock in the helicopter, is superimposed at the bottom right corner of the screen and a quiet ticking sound is heard throughout. The episode has no laugh track.
185	12	"Dear Uncle Abdul"	William Jurgensen	John Rappaport & Jim Mulligan	December 3, 1979	S-613
Klinger writes to his uncle Abdul about his duties as company clerk, while Hawkeye and B.J. worry about a mentally disabled soldier (Richard Lineback) who has been on combat duty.
186	13	"Captains Outrageous"	Burt Metcalfe	Thad Mumford & Dan Wilcox	December 10, 1979	S-614
The surgeons take care of Rosie's after she gets hurt in a brawl, while Father Mulcahy awaits his long-denied promotion. Featuring John Orchard, who had played "Ugly John" in the first season, in a different role. Sirri Murad, who portrays a Turkish soldier, also appeared in the Season 3 episode, "A Full Rich Day."
187	14	"Stars and Stripes"	Harry Morgan	Dennis Koenig	December 17, 1979	S-615
B.J. and Charles have a clash of the egos while working together on a medical paper. Third and final appearance of Scully, whose more traditional attitudes toward relationships clash with Margaret's less stringent views. Harry Morgan received a Primetime Emmy Award nomination for directing this episode.
188	15	"Yessir, That's Our Baby"	Alan Alda	Jim Mulligan	December 31, 1979	S-617
The 4077th tries to find a permanent home for a half-American, half-Korean baby abandoned at the camp. However, the officers find themselves caught between the United States' refusal to take responsibility for its soldiers' actions, and the likelihood that the child will be killed by Koreans in the name of racial purity.
189	16	"Bottle Fatigue"	Burt Metcalfe	Thad Mumford & Dan Wilcox	January 7, 1980	S-618
Because of his bar bill, Hawkeye gets off drinking for a week, but his self-righteousness starts driving everyone else crazy. Meanwhile, Charles is not happy about his sister Honoria's engagement to an Italian. Featuring Shelley Long.
190	17	"Heal Thyself"	Mike Farrell	Story by : Dennis Koenig and Gene Reynolds; Teleplay by : Dennis Koenig	January 14, 1980	S-616
When Potter and Charles are quarantined with the mumps, a replacement surgeon (Edward Herrmann) fills in for them, but he starts to crack under the pressure.
191	18	"Old Soldiers"	Charles S. Dubin	Dennis Koenig	January 21, 1980	S-620
While the camp is treating Korean refugees, Potter returns in a bad mood after visiting a sick friend and tells the officers about a tontine he formed with some of his fellow soldiers during World War I. Note: Harry Morgan received the Primetime Emmy for Outstanding Supporting Actor in a Comedy for his performance in this episode.
192	19	"Morale Victory"	Charles S. Dubin	John Rappaport	January 28, 1980	S-619
Music-loving Charles desperately seeks hope for a soldier whose injured right hand ends his career as a concert classical pianist, while Potter puts Hawkeye and B.J. in charge of morale. The movie at the beginning of the episode is Tales of Manhattan, released in 1942.
193	20	"Lend a Hand"	Alan Alda	Story by : Alan Alda and Burt Metcalfe; Teleplay by : Alan Alda; Jim Mulligan & John Rappaport; Thad Mumford & Dan Wilcox	February 4, 1980	S-621
Hawkeye clashes with a know-it-all surgeon, but the two must work together under fire at an aid station. Alan Alda's father Robert and half-brother Antony guest-star in this episode. Robert played the same character in the season 3 episode "The Consultant".
194	21	"Goodbye, Cruel World"	Charles S. Dubin	Thad Mumford & Dan Wilcox	February 11, 1980	S-622
Sidney Freedman visits the 4077th to deal with an Asian-American soldier (Clyde Kusatsu) who may be on the brink of suicide; Klinger attempts to redecorate his quarters with a 'few' things from home.
195	22	"Dreams"	Alan Alda	Story by : Alan Alda and James Jay Rubinfier; Teleplay by : Alan Alda	February 18, 1980	S-612
The surgeons get a few minutes of sleep during a long haul in the OR, but their pleasant dreams soon become nightmares. The episode has no laugh track. Alan Alda received a Primetime Emmy Award nomination for directing this episode.
196	23	"War Co-Respondent"	Mike Farrell	Mike Farrell	March 3, 1980	S-624
B.J. tries to stay faithful to his family back in California despite a mutual attraction between him and a famous war correspondent (Susan Saint James).
197	24	"Back Pay"	Burt Metcalfe	Thad Mumford & Dan Wilcox and Dennis Koenig	March 10, 1980	S-625
Hawkeye decides to bill the Army for his services, irked at stateside medical fees, as Charles seeks relief after throwing out his back.
198	25	"April Fools"	Charles S. Dubin	Dennis Koenig	March 24, 1980	S-623
A hot-tempered colonel (Pat Hingle) arrives at the 4077th on April Fools' Day.
