= M*A*S*H (TV series) =

American war comedy-drama TV series (1972–1983)

- Genre: Comedy drama; Medical drama; Sitcom; Tragicomedy; War
- Based on: MASH: A Novel About Three Army Doctors by Richard Hooker; M*A*S*H by Ring Lardner Jr.
- Developed by: Larry Gelbart
- Starring: Alan Alda; Wayne Rogers; McLean Stevenson; Loretta Swit; Larry Linville; Gary Burghoff; Mike Farrell; Harry Morgan; Jamie Farr; William Christopher; David Ogden Stiers
- Theme music composer: Johnny Mandel (written for the film)
- Opening theme: "Suicide Is Painless" (Instrumental)
- Ending theme: "Suicide Is Painless" (Big Band Version)
- Country of origin: United States
- Original language: English
- No. of seasons: 11
- No. of episodes: 256 (list of episodes)

Production
- Executive producers: Larry Gelbart (seasons 1–4); Gene Reynolds (seasons 1–5); Burt Metcalfe (seasons 6–11)
- Production locations: Los Angeles County, California (Century City, Malibu Creek State Park)
- Camera setup: Single-camera
- Running time: 24–26 minutes; except "Goodbye, Farewell and Amen" (2.5 hours)
- Production company: 20th Century-Fox Television

Original release
- Network: CBS
- Release: September 17, 1972 – February 28, 1983

Related
- M*A*S*H (1970 film); AfterMASH; W*A*L*T*E*R; Trapper John, M.D.

M*A*S*H is an American war comedy drama television series that aired on CBS from September 17, 1972, to February 28, 1983. It was developed by Larry Gelbart as the first original spin-off series adapted from the 1970 film of the same name, which, in turn, was based on Richard Hooker's 1968 novel MASH: A Novel About Three Army Doctors. The series, produced by 20th Century-Fox Television, follows a team of doctors and support staff stationed at the "4077th Mobile Army Surgical Hospital" in Uijeongbu, South Korea, during the Korean War (1950–1953).

The ensemble cast originally featured Alan Alda and Wayne Rogers as surgeons Benjamin "Hawkeye" Pierce and "Trapper" John McIntyre, respectively, as the protagonists of the show. They were joined by Larry Linville as surgeon Frank Burns, Loretta Swit as head nurse Margaret "Hot Lips" Houlihan, McLean Stevenson as company commander Henry Blake, Gary Burghoff as company clerk Walter "Radar" O'Reilly, Jamie Farr as orderly Maxwell Klinger, and William Christopher as the chaplain, Father John Mulcahy. Over the run of the show, several members of the main cast were replaced: Wayne Rogers was replaced by Mike Farrell as B. J. Hunnicutt, McLean Stevenson was replaced by Harry Morgan as Sherman Potter, Larry Linville was replaced by David Ogden Stiers as Charles Emerson Winchester III, and, when Gary Burghoff left the show, the Maxwell Klinger character moved into the company clerk role. Longtime supporting cast members included Kellye Nakahara, Jeff Maxwell, Johnny Haymer, Allan Arbus, Edward Winter and G. W. Bailey.

The series varied in style and tone—including broad comedy and tragedy—which can be attributed to fluctuating writing staff over the life of the show and the variety of sources contributing to the stories, such as actor Alan Alda and surgeons who served in the Korean War. The show's title sequence features an instrumental version of "Suicide Is Painless", the original film's theme song.

The show was created after an attempt to film the original book's sequel, M*A*S*H Goes to Maine, failed. The television series is the best known of the M*A*S*H works and one of the highest-rated shows in U.S. television history and is regarded by many as one of the greatest television shows of all time. Its final episode, "Goodbye, Farewell and Amen", was the most-watched television broadcast in the United States from 1983 to 2010, and it remains both the most-watched finale of any television series and the most-watched episode of a scripted series.

== Premise ==
M*A*S*H aired weekly on CBS, with most episodes being a half-hour in length. The series is usually categorized as a situation comedy, though it has also been described as a "dark comedy" or a "dramedy" because of the often dramatic subject matter. (Note: The term "dramedy" (drama + comedy), although coined in 1978, was not in common usage until after M*A*S*H had gone off the air.)

The show is an ensemble piece revolving around key personnel in a United States Army Mobile Army Surgical Hospital (MASH) in the Korean War (1950–53). The "4077th MASH" was one of several surgical units in Korea. The asterisks in the name are not part of military nomenclature and were creatively introduced in the novel and used in only the posters for the movie version, not the actual movie.

Early seasons aired on network prime time while the Vietnam War had not ended; the show was forced to walk the fine line of reflecting on that war while at the same time not seeming to protest against it. The show's discourse, under the cover of comedy, often questioned, mocked and grappled with America's role in the Cold War.

Episodes were both plot- and character-driven, with several narrated by one of the show's characters as the contents of a letter home. The show's tone could move from silly to sobering from one episode to the next, with dramatic tension often occurring between the unwilling civilian draftees of 4077th—Captains Pierce, McIntyre and Hunnicutt and the "regular Army" characters, such as Major Houlihan and Colonel Potter, who were commissioned as regulars. Other characters, such as Lieutenant Colonel Blake, Major Winchester and Corporal/Sergeant Klinger, help demonstrate various American civilian attitudes toward Army life, while guest characters played by actors such as Eldon Quick, Herb Voland, Mary Wickes and Tim O'Connor also help further the show's discussion of America's place as Cold War participant and peace maker.

Reviewing the series in 1980 for the BBC, Ludovic Kennedy observed "...its humour derives mainly from the layman's delight in finding that members of the medical profession (traditionally totem figures) can in their social lives be just as venal and silly as the rest of us."

== Characters ==
=== Main cast ===
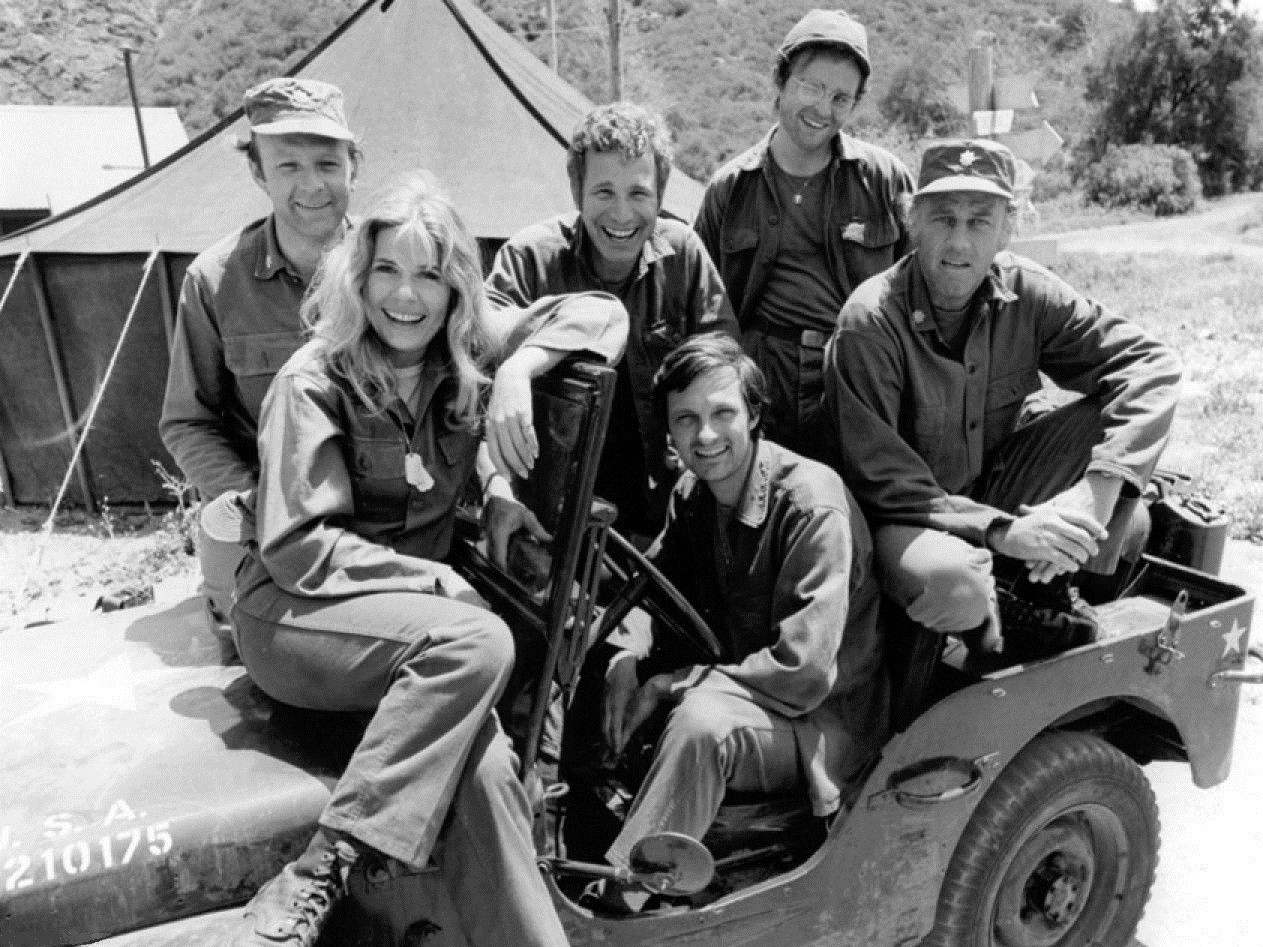
Cast just prior to production of season 3, 1974 (clockwise from left): Loretta Swit, Larry Linville, Wayne Rogers, Gary Burghoff, McLean Stevenson and Alan Alda

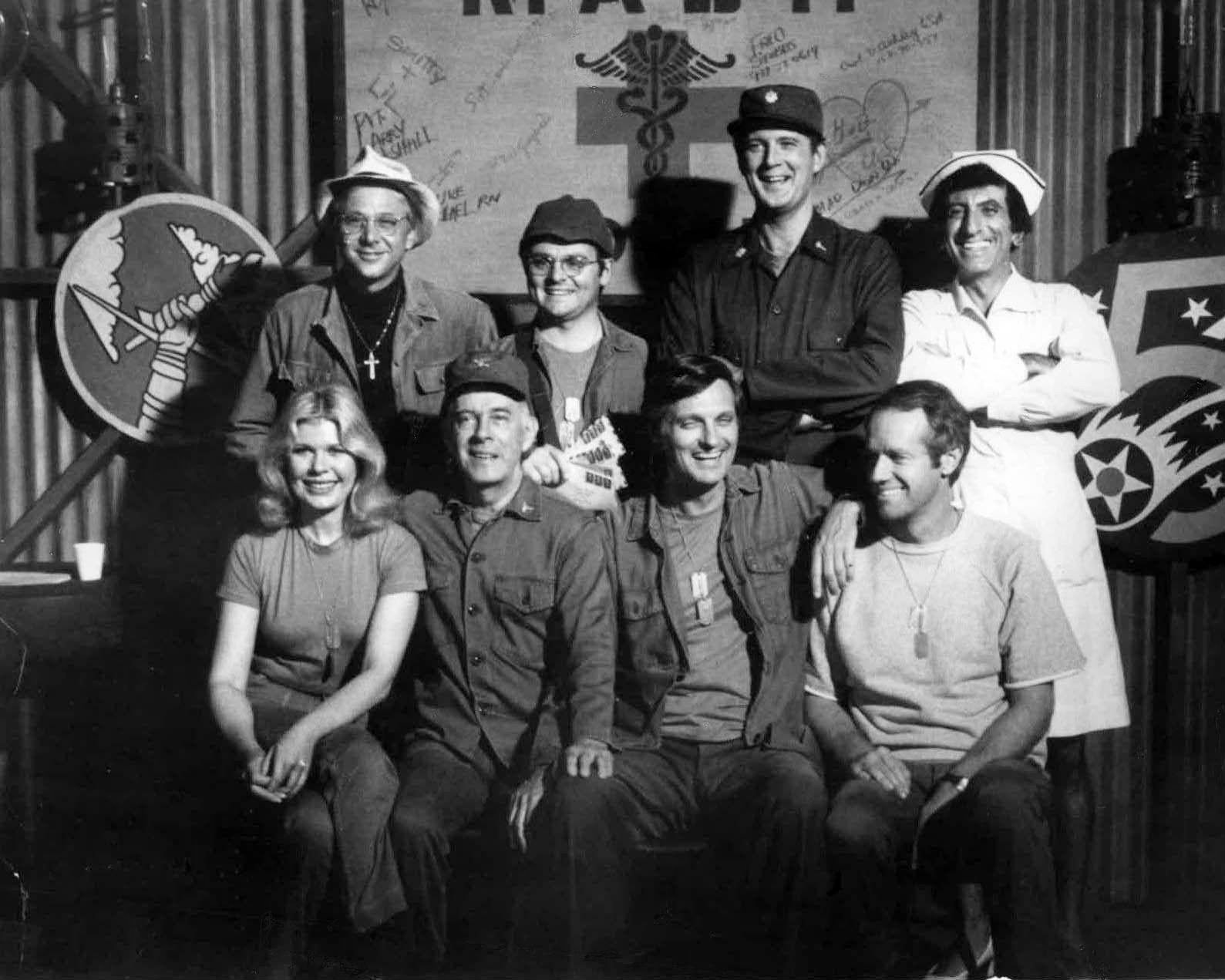
The cast from season 6, 1977 (clockwise from left): William Christopher, Gary Burghoff, David Ogden Stiers, Jamie Farr, Mike Farrell, Alan Alda, Harry Morgan, Loretta Swit

The cast from season 8 onward (clockwise from left): Mike Farrell, William Christopher, Jamie Farr, David Ogden Stiers, Loretta Swit, Alan Alda and Harry Morgan

Through changes of personnel M*A*S*H maintained a relatively constant ensemble cast, with four characters—Hawkeye, Father Mulcahy, Margaret Houlihan and Maxwell Klinger—on the show for all 11 seasons. Several other main characters departed or joined the program during its run, and numerous guest actors and recurring characters were used. The writers found creating so many names difficult, and used names from elsewhere; for example, characters on the seventh season were named after the 1978 Los Angeles Dodgers.

Character	Actor/actress	Rank	Role	Appearances
Benjamin Franklin "Hawkeye" Pierce	Alan Alda	Captain	Chief surgeon	256
Margaret "Hot Lips" Houlihan (Penobscott)	Loretta Swit	Major	Head Nurse	239
Maxwell Q. Klinger (recurring seasons 1–3, regular 4–11)	Jamie Farr	Corporal, later sergeant	Combat medic, later company clerk	217
Father John Patrick Francis Mulcahy (recurring seasons 1–4, regular 5–11)	George Morgan (pilot episode), replaced by William Christopher	First lieutenant, later captain	Chaplain	213
Trapper John McIntyre (seasons 1–3)	Wayne Rogers	Captain	Surgeon	72
Henry Blake (seasons 1–3)	McLean Stevenson	Lieutenant colonel	Commanding officer, Surgeon	70
Frank Marion Burns (seasons 1–5)	Larry Linville	Major, later lieutenant colonel	Executive officer, interim commanding officer	118
Walter Eugene "Radar" O'Reilly (seasons 1–8)	Gary Burghoff	Corporal, briefly Second Lieutenant	Company clerk, bugler	156
B. J. Hunnicutt (replaced Trapper; seasons 4–11)	Mike Farrell	Captain	Surgeon	183
Sherman T. Potter (replaced Henry Blake; seasons 4–11)	Harry Morgan	Colonel	Commanding officer (after Lt. Col. Blake), Surgeon	182
Charles Emerson Winchester III (replaced Frank Burns; seasons 6–11)	David Ogden Stiers	Major	Surgeon, executive officer	133

==== Main character timeline ====
For the first three seasons, the show's ensemble cast included Alan Alda as surgeon Captain Benjamin Franklin "Hawkeye" Pierce, Wayne Rogers as surgeon Captain Trapper John McIntyre, McLean Stevenson as company commander Lt. Colonel Henry Blake, Loretta Swit as head nurse Major Margaret "Hot Lips" Houlihan, Larry Linville as surgeon Major Frank Burns, Gary Burghoff as company clerk Corporal Walter Eugene "Radar" O'Reilly, Jamie Farr as combat medic Corporal Maxwell Klinger, and William Christopher as chaplain 1st Lieutenant Father John Patrick Francis Mulcahy.

At the end of the third season, Rogers and Stevenson left the show, with their characters written out, and they were replaced by Mike Farrell as surgeon Captain B. J. Hunnicutt and Harry Morgan as surgeon Colonel Sherman T. Potter as the new commanding officer.

After season 5, Linville left to be replaced by David Ogden Stiers as surgeon Major Charles Emerson Winchester III.

Early in season 8, Burghoff left the show; Klinger (Farr) was moved to company clerk to replace Radar, while G. W. Bailey joined the cast to play Staff Sergeant Luther Rizzo, the unit's motor pool sergeant. Other long-serving actors on the show include Kellye Nakahara as Nurse Kellye, Jeff Maxwell as Private Igor Straminsky, Johnny Haymer as Sergeant Zelmo Zale, the supply sergeant, Allan Arbus as psychiatrist Major Sidney Freedman, and Edward Winter as intelligence officer Colonel Sam Flagg.

== Production ==
=== Writing ===
As the series progressed, it made a significant shift from being primarily a comedy with dramatic undertones to a drama with comedic overtones. This was a result of changes in writing, production and acting staff. Series co-creator and comedy writer Larry Gelbart departed after season 4. Executive producer Gene Reynolds departed at the conclusion of season 5 in 1977, resulting in M*A*S*H being almost fully stripped of its original comedic foundation by the beginning of season 6 (although Reynolds would be credited as a creative consultant from the beginning of season 6 until the end of the series in 1983).

Whereas Gelbart and Reynolds were the comedic voice of M*A*S*H for the show's first five seasons (1972–1977), Alan Alda and newly promoted executive producer Burt Metcalfe became the new dramatic voice of M*A*S*H for seasons 6–11. By the start of season 8 (1979–1980), the writing staff had been completely overhauled.

Cast changes also contributed to the greater weighting of drama in later series M*A*S*H. The departures of McLean Stevenson, Larry Linville and Gary Burghoff removed gifted performers of physical and verbal comedy. Wayne Rogers' Trapper John had been Hawkeye's partner in high jinks and womanizing, while his successor in Mike Farrell's B.J. gave Hawkeye a more mature best friendship. A gentler characterization made Margaret a less pointed comedy foil, and after Klinger took over Radar's responsibilities he discontinued cross-dressing and other attempts to get a Section 8 psychiatric discharge.

The end of the Vietnam War in 1975 was a significant factor as to why storylines become less political in nature and more character-driven. Several episodes experimented by going outside the sitcom format:

- "Point of View" – shown from the perspective of a soldier with a throat wound
- "Dreams" – an idea of Alda's, where during a deluge of casualties, members of the 4077th take naps on a rotation basis, allowing the viewer to see the simultaneously lyrical and disturbing dreams
- "A War for All Seasons" – features a story line that takes place over the course of 1951
- "Life Time" – utilizes a real-time method of narration

Another change was the infusion of story lines based on actual events and medical developments that materialized during the Korean War. Considerable research was done by the producers, including interviews with actual MASH surgeons and personnel to develop story lines rooted in the war itself. Such early-1950s events as the McCarthy era, various sporting events, and the stardom of Marilyn Monroe were all incorporated into various episodes, a trend that continued until the end of the series.

While the series remained popular through these changes, it eventually began to run out of creative steam. Korean War doctors regularly contacted producers with experiences that they thought might make for a good storyline, only to learn the idea had previously been used. Harry Morgan admitted that he felt "the cracks were starting to show" by season 9 (1980–1981). Alda wished to make season 10 (1981–1982) M*A*S*H's last, but was persuaded by CBS to produce a slightly shortened 11th season, coupled with a farewell movie finale. In the end, season 11 had 15 episodes (although six had been filmed during season 10 and held over) and a 2 1/2-hour movie, which was treated as five episodes and was filmed before the nine remaining episodes. The final episode produced was the penultimately aired episode "As Time Goes By". The series finale movie, titled "Goodbye, Farewell and Amen", became the most-watched U.S. television broadcast in history at that time, with 106 million viewers.

=== Set and filming ===
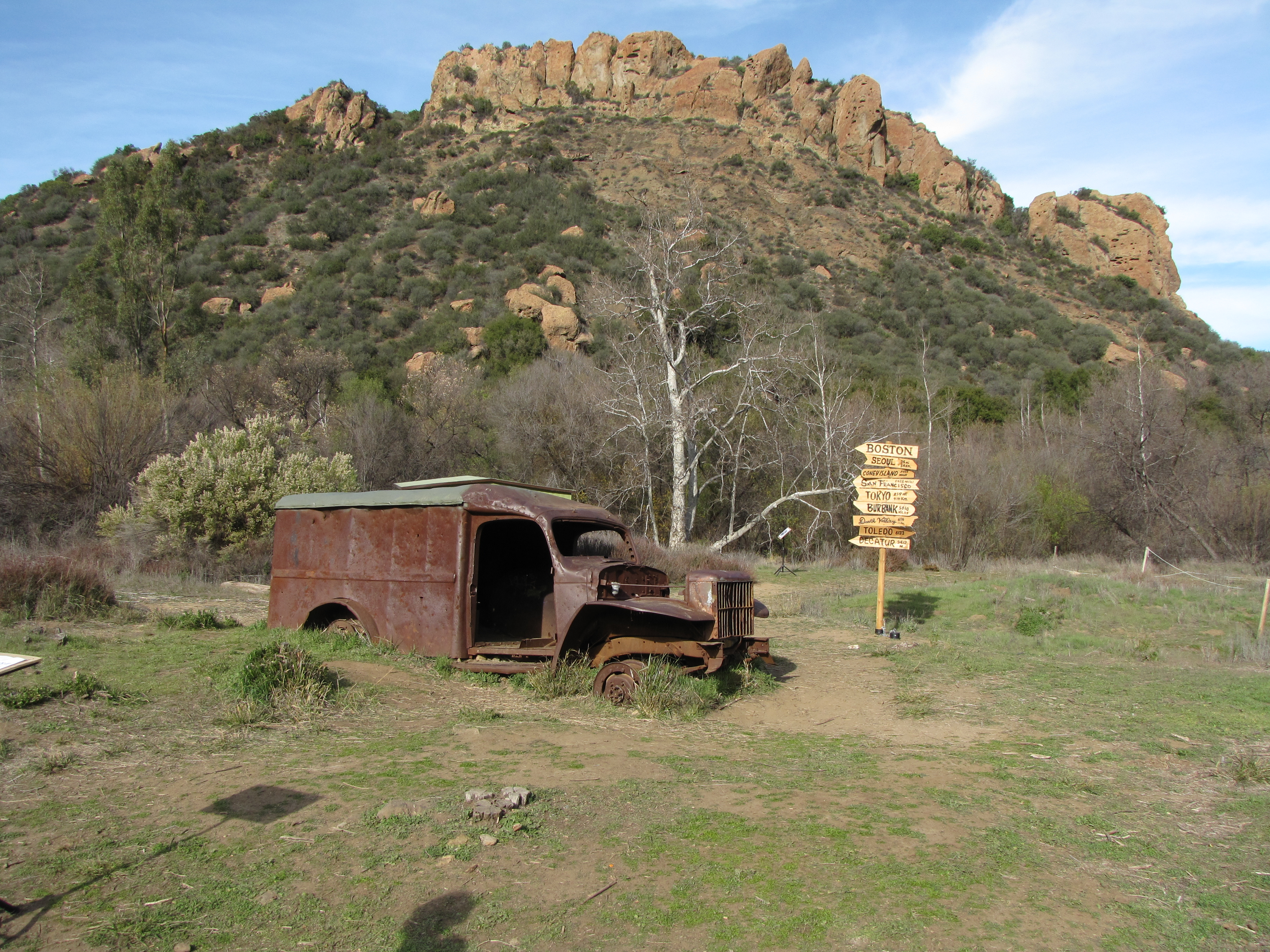
M*A*S*H site in Malibu Creek State Park. Burnt-out Dodge WC54 ambulance used in filming. A replica of the iconic M*A*S*H signpost was installed on the site in 2008.

The 4077th consisted of two separate sets. An outdoor set in the mountains near Malibu (Calabasas, Los Angeles County, California) (34°5′47.55″N 118°44′41.24″W) was used for most exterior and tent scenes for every season. This was the same location used to shoot the movie, although the number of tents was reduced and there were changes made to the positions of several tents for the TV show. The indoor set, on Stage 09 at Fox Studios in Century City, was used for the indoor scenes for the run of the series. Later, after the indoor set was renovated to permit many of the "outdoor" scenes to be filmed there, both sets were used for exterior shooting as script requirements dictated (e.g., night scenes were far easier to film on the sound stage, but scenes at the helicopter pad required using the ranch).

Just as the series was wrapping production, a brush fire destroyed most of the outdoor set on October 9, 1982. The fire was written into the final episode "Goodbye, Farewell and Amen" as a forest fire caused by enemy incendiary bombs that forced the 4077th to move out.

The Malibu location is today known as Malibu Creek State Park. Formerly called the Century Ranch and owned by 20th Century Fox Studios until the 1980s, the site today is returning to a natural state, and is marked by a rusted Jeep and a Dodge ambulance used in the show. Through the 1990s, the area was occasionally used for television commercial production.

On February 23, 2008, series stars Mike Farrell, Loretta Swit and William Christopher (along with producers Gene Reynolds and Burt Metcalfe and M*A*S*H director Charles S. Dubin) reunited at the set to celebrate its partial restoration. The rebuilt signpost is now displayed on weekends, along with tent markers and maps and photos of the set. The state park is open to the public. It was also the location where the film How Green Was My Valley (1941) and the Planet of the Apes television series (1974) were filmed, among many other productions. Much of this location, including the signpost and markers, was thought to have been destroyed in the 2018 Woolsey Fire but subsequently was determined to have survived the fire.

The operating room set on display in the National Museum of American History as part of the "MASH: Binding Up the Wounds" exhibit in 1983

There was an exhibition called M*A*S*H: Binding Up the Wounds at the National Museum of American History from July 30, 1983, through February 3, 1985. The exhibition was extremely popular, drawing more than 17,000 in a single week, a record for any Smithsonian display.

The Swamp and Operating Room sets, one of the show's 14 Emmy Awards, early drafts of the pilot script, costumes from the show and other memorabilia were all exhibited. Sets were decorated with props from the show including the iconic signpost, Hawkeye's still and Major Winchester's Webcor tape recorder and phonograph. The exhibit also encouraged visitors to compare the show to real Mobile Army Surgical Hospitals of the Korean and the Vietnam Wars.

=== Laugh track ===
Series creators Larry Gelbart and Gene Reynolds wanted M*A*S*H broadcast without a laugh track. Though CBS initially rejected the idea, a compromise was reached that allowed for omitting the laughter during operating room scenes if desired. "We told the network that under no circumstances would we ever can laughter during an OR scene when the doctors were working," said Gelbart in 1998. "It's hard to imagine that 300 people were in there laughing at somebody's guts being sewn up."

Seasons 1–5 utilized a more invasive laugh track; a more subdued audience was employed for seasons 6–11 when the series shifted from sitcom to comedy drama with the departure of Gelbart and Reynolds. Several episodes ("O.R.", "The Bus", "Quo Vadis, Captain Chandler?", "The Interview", "Point of View" and "Dreams" among them) omitted the laugh track altogether; as did almost all of season 11, including the 135-minute series finale, "Goodbye, Farewell and Amen". The laugh track is also omitted from some international and syndicated airings of the show. On one occasion during an airing on BBC2 in the UK, the laugh track was accidentally left on, and viewers expressed their displeasure; an apology from the network for the "technical difficulty" was later released, for during its original run on BBC2 in the UK, it had been shown without the laugh track. British DVD critics speak poorly of the laugh track, stating "canned laughter is intrusive at the best of times, but with a programme like M*A*S*H, it's downright unbearable."

On all released DVDs, both in Region 1 (including the U.S. and Canada) and Region 2 (Europe, including the UK), an option is given to watch the show with or without the laugh track.

"They're a lie," said Gelbart in a 1992 interview. "You're telling an engineer when to push a button to produce a laugh from people who don't exist. It's just so dishonest. The biggest shows when we were on the air were All in the Family and The Mary Tyler Moore Show both of which were taped before a live studio audience where laughter made sense," continued Gelbart. "But our show was a film show—supposedly shot in the middle of Korea. So the question I always asked the network was, 'Who are these laughing people? Where did they come from?'" Gelbart persuaded CBS to test the show in private screenings with and without the laugh track. The results showed no measurable difference in the audience's enjoyment. "So you know what they said?" Gelbart said. "'Since there's no difference, let's leave it alone!' The people who defend laugh tracks have no sense of humor." Gelbart summed up the situation by saying, "I always thought it cheapened the show. The network got their way. They were paying for dinner."

=== Content ===
In his blog, writer Ken Levine revealed that on one occasion, when the cast offered too many nitpicking "notes" on a script, he and his writing partner changed the script to a "cold show"—one set during the frigid Korean winter. The cast then had to stand around barrel fires in parkas at the Malibu ranch when the temperatures neared 100 °F (38 °C). Levine says, "This happened maybe twice, and we never got a ticky-tack note again."

Jackie Cooper wrote that Alan Alda—whom Cooper directed in several episodes during the first two seasons—concealed what Cooper felt was a lot of hostility toward him, and the two barely spoke to each other by the time Cooper's tenure on the show ended.

== Episodes ==
Season	Episodes	Originally released		Rank	Rating
Season	Episodes	First released	Last released	Rank	Rating
1	24	September 17, 1972	March 25, 1973	46	17.5
2	24	September 15, 1973	March 2, 1974	4	25.7
3	24	September 10, 1974	March 18, 1975	5	27.4
4	25	September 12, 1975	February 24, 1976	14	22.9
5	25	September 21, 1976	March 15, 1977	4	25.9
6	25	September 20, 1977	March 27, 1978	8	23.2
7	26	September 18, 1978	March 12, 1979	7	25.4
8	25	September 17, 1979	March 24, 1980	4	25.3
9	20	November 17, 1980	May 4, 1981	4	25.7
10	22	October 26, 1981	April 12, 1982	9	22.3
11	16	October 25, 1982	February 28, 1983	3	22.6

=== Final episode: "Goodbye, Farewell and Amen" ===
"Goodbye, Farewell and Amen" was the final episode of M*A*S*H. Special television sets were placed in PX parking lots, auditoriums and day rooms of the U.S. Army in Korea so that military personnel could watch that episode, in spite of 14 hours' time-zone difference with the East Coast of the U.S. The episode aired on February 28, 1983, and was 2 1/2 hours long. The episode got a Nielsen rating of 60.2 and 77 share and according to a New York Times article from 1983, the final episode of M*A*S*H had 125 million viewers.

When the M*A*S*H finale aired in 1983, more than 83.3 million homes in the U.S. had televisions, compared to almost 115 million in February 2010.

"Goodbye, Farewell and Amen" broke the record for the highest percentage of homes with television sets to watch a television series. Stories persist that the episode was seen by so many people that the New York City Sanitation/Public Works Department reported the plumbing systems broke down in some parts of the city from so many New Yorkers waiting until the end to use the toilet. Articles copied into Alan Alda's book The Last Days of M*A*S*H include interviews with New York City Sanitation workers citing the spike in water use on that night. According to the interviews at 11:03 p.m., EST New York City public works noted the highest water usage at one given time in the city's history. They attributed this to the fact that in the three minutes after the finale ended, around 77 percent of the people of New York City flushed their toilets. These stories have all since been identified as part of an urban legend dating back to the days of the Amos and Andy radio program in the 1930s.

== Reception ==
=== Ratings and recognition ===
The series premiered in the United States on September 17, 1972, and ended on February 28, 1983, with the finale, showcased as a television film, titled "Goodbye, Farewell and Amen", becoming the most-watched and highest-rated television episode in U.S. television history at the time, with a record-breaking 125 million viewers (60.2 rating and 77 share), according to The New York Times. It had struggled in its first season and was at risk of being canceled. In season two, M*A*S*H was placed in a better time slot by CBS (airing after the popular All in the Family, taking the place of Bridget Loves Bernie, which had been canceled after one season despite good ratings due to religious groups protesting against the show's premise of an inter-faith marriage between the title characters); the show then became one of the top 10 programs of the year and stayed in the top 20 programs for the rest of its run. It is still broadcast in syndication on various television stations. The series, which depicted events occurring during a three-year war, spanned 256 episodes and lasted 11 seasons. The Korean War lasted 1,128 days, meaning each episode of the series would have averaged almost four and a half days of real time. Many of the stories in the early seasons are based on tales told by real MASH surgeons who were interviewed by the production team. Like the movie, the series was as much an allegory about the Vietnam War (still in progress when the show began) as it was about the Korean War.

The episodes "Abyssinia, Henry" and "The Interview" were ranked number 20 and number 80, respectively, on TV Guide's 100 Greatest Episodes of All Time in 1997. In 2002, M*A*S*H was ranked number 25 on TV Guide's 50 Greatest TV Shows of All Time. In February 2008, the series was named the number-one smartest TV show of all time by Jim Werdell, chairman of Mensa International, who said that it "had smart repartee and was so much more than a comedy". In 2013, the Writers Guild of America ranked it as the fifth-best written TV series ever and TV Guide ranked it as the eighth-greatest show of all time. In 2016, Rolling Stone ranked it as the 16th-greatest TV show. In 2023, Variety ranked M*A*S*H #24 on its list of the 100 greatest TV shows of all time.

=== Season ratings ===
Season		Ep #	Time slot (ET)	Season Premiere	Season Finale	Nielsen Ratings		
Season		Ep #	Time slot (ET)	Season Premiere	Season Finale	Rank	Viewers (in millions)	Rating
1	1972–73	24	Sunday at 8:00 p.m.	September 17, 1972	March 25, 1973	#46	—N/a	17.4
2	1973–74	24	Saturday at 8:30 p.m.	September 15, 1973	March 2, 1974	#4	17.02	25.7
3	1974–75	24	Tuesday at 8:30 p.m.	September 10, 1974	March 18, 1975	#5	18.76	27.4
4	1975–76	25	Friday at 8:00 p.m. (Episode 1); Friday at 8:30 p.m. (Episodes 2–13); Tuesday at 9:00 p.m. (Episodes 14–25)	September 12, 1975	February 24, 1976	#15	15.93	22.9
5	1976–77	25	Tuesday at 9:00 p.m. (Episodes 1, 3–25); Tuesday at 9:30 p.m. (Episode 2)	September 21, 1976	March 15, 1977	#4	18.44	25.9
6	1977–78	25	Tuesday at 9:00 p.m. (Episodes 1, 3–19); Tuesday at 9:30 p.m. (Episode 2); Monday at 9:00 p.m. (Episodes 20–25)	September 20, 1977	March 27, 1978	#9	16.91	23.2
7	1978–79	26	Monday at 9:00 p.m. (Episodes 1–4, 6–26); Monday at 9:30 p.m. (Episode 5)	September 18, 1978	March 12, 1979	#7	18.92	25.4
8	1979–80	25	Monday at 9:00 p.m.	September 17, 1979	March 24, 1980	#5	19.30	25.3
9	1980–81	20	Monday at 9:00 p.m.	November 17, 1980	May 4, 1981	#4	20.53	25.7
10	1981–82	22	Monday at 9:00 p.m. (Episodes 1, 3–22); Monday at 9:30 p.m. (Episode 2)	October 26, 1981	April 12, 1982	#9	18.17	22.3
11	1982–83	16	Monday at 9:00 p.m. (Episodes 1–15); Monday at 8:30 p.m. (Episode 16)	October 25, 1982	February 28, 1983	#3	18.82	22.6

=== Awards ===
M*A*S*H was nominated for over 100 Emmy Awards during its 11-year run, winning 14:

- 1974 – Outstanding Comedy Series – M*A*S*H; Larry Gelbart, Gene Reynolds (Producers)
- 1974 – Best Lead Actor in a Comedy Series – Alan Alda
- 1974 – Best Directing in Comedy – Jackie Cooper: "Carry On, Hawkeye"
- 1974 – Actor of the Year, Series – Alan Alda
- 1975 – Outstanding Directing in a Comedy Series – Gene Reynolds: "O.R."
- 1976 – Outstanding Film Editing for Entertainment Programming – Fred W. Berger and Stanford Tischler: "Welcome to Korea"
- 1976 – Outstanding Directing in a Comedy Series – Gene Reynolds: "Welcome to Korea"
- 1977 – Outstanding Directing in a Comedy Series – Alan Alda: "Dear Sigmund"
- 1977 – Outstanding Supporting Actor in a Comedy Series – Gary Burghoff
- 1979 – Outstanding Writing in a Comedy-Variety or Music Series – Alan Alda: "Inga"
- 1980 – Outstanding Supporting Actress in a Comedy or Variety or Music Series – Loretta Swit
- 1980 – Outstanding Supporting Actor in a Comedy or Variety or Music Series – Harry Morgan
- 1982 – Outstanding Lead Actor in a Comedy Series – Alan Alda
- 1982 – Outstanding Supporting Actress in a Comedy or Variety or Music Series – Loretta Swit

The show won the Golden Globe Award for Best Television Series (Musical or Comedy) in 1981. Alan Alda won the Golden Globe for Best Actor in a Television Series (Musical or Comedy) six times: in 1975, 1976, 1980, 1981, 1982 and 1983. McLean Stevenson won the award for Best Supporting Actor in a Television Series in 1974.

The series earned the Directors Guild of America Award for Outstanding Directorial Achievement in a Comedy Series seven times: 1973 (Gene Reynolds), 1974 (Reynolds), 1975 (Hy Averback), 1976 (Averback), 1977 (Alan Alda), 1982 (Alda) and 1983 (Alda).

The show was honored with a Peabody Award in 1975 "for the depth of its humor and the manner in which comedy is used to lift the spirit and, as well, to offer a profound statement on the nature of war." M*A*S*H was cited as "an example of television of high purpose that reveals in universal terms a time and place with such affecting clarity."

Writers for the show received several Humanitas Prize nominations, with Larry Gelbart winning in 1976, Alan Alda winning in 1980, and the team of David Pollock and Elias Davis winning twice in 1982 and 1983.

The series received 28 Writers Guild of America Award nominations—26 for Episodic Comedy and two for Episodic Drama. Seven episodes won for Episodic Comedy in 1973, 1975, 1976, 1977, 1979, 1980 and 1981.

== Home entertainment ==
20th Century Fox Home Entertainment has released all 11 seasons of M*A*S*H on DVD in Region 1 and Region 2.

DVD title	Ep No.	Release dates	
DVD title	Ep No.	Region 1	Region 2
M*A*S*H Season 1	24	January 8, 2002	May 19, 2003
M*A*S*H Season 2	24	July 23, 2002	October 13, 2003
M*A*S*H Season 3	24	February 18, 2003	March 15, 2004
M*A*S*H Seasons 1–3	72	N/A	October 31, 2005
M*A*S*H Season 4	24	July 15, 2003	June 14, 2004
M*A*S*H Seasons 1–4	96	December 2, 2003	N/A
M*A*S*H Season 5	24	December 9, 2003	January 17, 2005
M*A*S*H Season 6	24	June 8, 2004	March 28, 2005
M*A*S*H Season 7	25	December 7, 2004	May 30, 2005
M*A*S*H Season 8	25	May 24, 2005	August 15, 2005
M*A*S*H Season 9	20	December 6, 2005	January 9, 2006
M*A*S*H Seasons 1–9	214	December 6, 2005	N/A
M*A*S*H Season 10	22	May 23, 2006	April 17, 2006
M*A*S*H Season 11	16	November 7, 2006	May 29, 2006
Martinis and Medicine Collection (Complete Series, including the Original Movie)	256	November 7, 2006	October 30, 2006
Goodbye, Farewell, and Amen Collector's Edition	1	May 15, 2007	N/A

In January 2015, it was announced that the first five seasons of M*A*S*H would be available on Netflix's instant streaming service beginning February 1, 2015. This marked the first time the series was made available on an internet platform. As of July 1, 2015, all 11 seasons were available; syndicated versions of hour-long episodes were utilized for streaming, splitting these shows into two parts. In contrast to the DVD sets, the Netflix streams did not have an option for disabling the laugh track on the soundtrack. On April 1, 2016, Netflix' contract to stream the series expired and M*A*S*H was removed from the platform.

In July 2017, it was announced that Hulu had acquired U.S. streaming rights for the entire run of M*A*S*H, along with several other 20th Century Fox-owned TV programs. All 256 episodes were added to Hulu beginning June 29, 2018. Outside the U.S., the series is available on Disney+'s Star section and the Star+ service in Latin America.

== Games ==
Two board games were created based on the show. The first came out in 1975 and was published by Transogram, and the second was published in 1981 by Milton Bradley. A trivia game was published by Golden in 1984. It was available in two variations, one with a full complement of paraphernalia including game-tray, die and point-value cards and another version that was just question cards.

A M*A*S*H video game was developed by Doug Neubauer and released by Fox Video Games in 1983. In his August, 1983 review for Electronic Fun with Computers & Games, reviewer Marc Berman gave M*A*S*H "3½ Joysticks" and, while complimenting the game as a whole, said it lacked the humanity present in both the television series and the original film.

== Merchandise ==
A trading card set was published in 1982 by Donruss. Also in 1982, Tri-Star International produced a set of MASH action figures, with vehicles and a play set.

== Spin-offs and reunion specials ==
The two-season spin-off AfterMASH (1983–1985) inherited the parent show's Monday night time slot and featured a few of its main characters reunited in a Midwestern hospital after the war. The more successful Trapper John, M.D. (1979–1986) took place nearly three decades after the events of M*A*S*H and depicted Trapper John McIntyre as chief of surgery at a San Francisco hospital; its producers argued successfully in court that it was based on the earlier movie rather than the TV series. In an unpurchased television pilot, W*A*L*T*E*R (1984), Walter "Radar" O'Reilly joins the St. Louis police force after his farm fails following his return to the U.S.

Making M*A*S*H, a documentary special narrated by Mary Tyler Moore that takes viewers behind the production of the eighth-season episodes "Old Soldiers" and "Lend a Hand", was produced for PBS, and aired on January 21, 1981. The special was later included in the syndicated rerun package, with new narration by producer Michael Hirsch.

Three retrospective specials were produced to commemorate the show's 20th, 30th and 50th anniversaries:

- Memories of M*A*S*H, hosted by Shelley Long and featuring clips from the series and interviews with cast members, was aired by CBS on November 25, 1991.
- M*A*S*H: 30th Anniversary Reunion, in which the surviving cast members and producers gathered to reminisce, aired on Fox on May 17, 2002. The two-hour broadcast was hosted by Mike Farrell, who also got to interact with the actor he replaced, Wayne Rogers; previously filmed interviews with McLean Stevenson and Larry Linville (who had died in 1996 and 2000, respectively) were also featured.
- M*A*S*H: When Television Changed Forever, a one-hour retrospective commemorating the show's 50th anniversary, aired on Reelz on September 13, 2022. It featured new exclusive interviews with cast members Jamie Farr, Mike Farrell and Jeff Maxwell, as well as producers and writers, exploring the series' popularity and creative firsts.

Memories of M*A*S*H and M*A*S*H: 30th Anniversary Reunion are included as bonuses on the Collector's Edition DVD of "Goodbye, Farewell, and Amen". Also included is "M*A*S*H: Television's Serious Sitcom," a 2002 episode of A&E channel's Biography program that detailed the show's history.

In the late 1980s, the cast had a partial reunion in a series of commercials for IBM products, including personal computers and the AS/400 system. All of the front-billed regulars (with the exceptions of Farrell and Stevenson) appeared in the spots over time.
