= Larry Linville =

American actor (1939–2000)

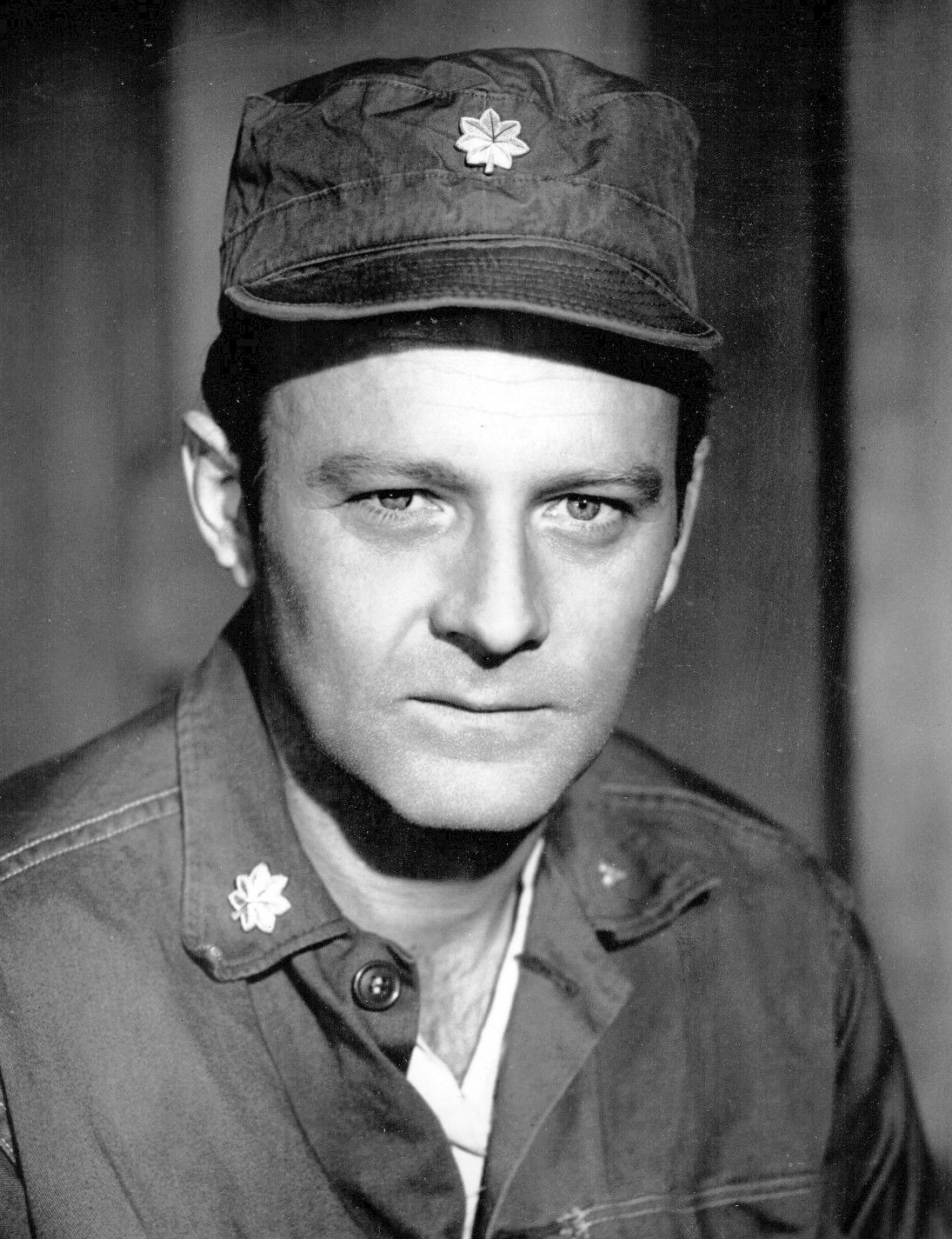
- Linville as Frank Burns in M*A*S*H
- Born: Lawrence Lavon Linville; September 29, 1939; Ojai, California, U.S.
- Died: April 10, 2000 (aged 60); New York City, U.S.
- Education: University of Colorado Boulder; Royal Academy of Dramatic Art
- Occupation: Actor
- Years active: 1960–2000
- Spouses: Kate Geer (m. 1962; div. 1975); Vana Tribbey (m. 1977; div. 1982); Melissa Gallant (m. 1982; div. 1985); Susan Hagan (m. 1986; div. 1992); Deborah Guydon (m. 1993)
- Children: 1

Lawrence Lavon Linville (September 29, 1939 – April 10, 2000) was an American actor known for his portrayal of the surgeon Major Frank Burns on the television series M*A*S*H.

== Early life and education ==
Linville was born in Ojai, California, the son of Fay Pauline (née Kennedy) and Harry Lavon Linville. Raised in Sacramento, he attended El Camino High School (class of 1957) and later studied aeronautical engineering at the University of Colorado at Boulder before applying for a scholarship to the Royal Academy of Dramatic Art in London.

== Career ==
After returning to the United States, Linville began his acting career at the Barter Theatre in Abingdon, Virginia, a year-round repertory theater under director Robert Porterfield.

=== Early career ===
Before his five-year co-starring role on M*A*S*H, Linville had guest-starring roles on many of the well-known television series of the late 1960s and early 1970s. Included in his credits in that period are one appearance each on Bonanza, Room 222 and Adam-12. He had three appearances, as three different characters, on Mission: Impossible over three seasons of that television series. On the early seasons of Mannix, Linville had a recurring role as Lieutenant George Kramer, an ally of Mannix in the L.A. Police Department.

Linville played the coroner on the television movie The Night Stalker (1972), a predecessor of the Kolchak television series, and in the episode titled "Chopper" of Kolchak: The Night Stalker, he played the youngest police captain on the force investigating murders committed by a headless motorbike rider. He also had a small role in the film Kotch (1971). Linville also appeared as U.S. Treasury Agent Hugh Emery in the 1972 television series Search episode "One of Our Probes is Missing".

=== M*A*S*H ===
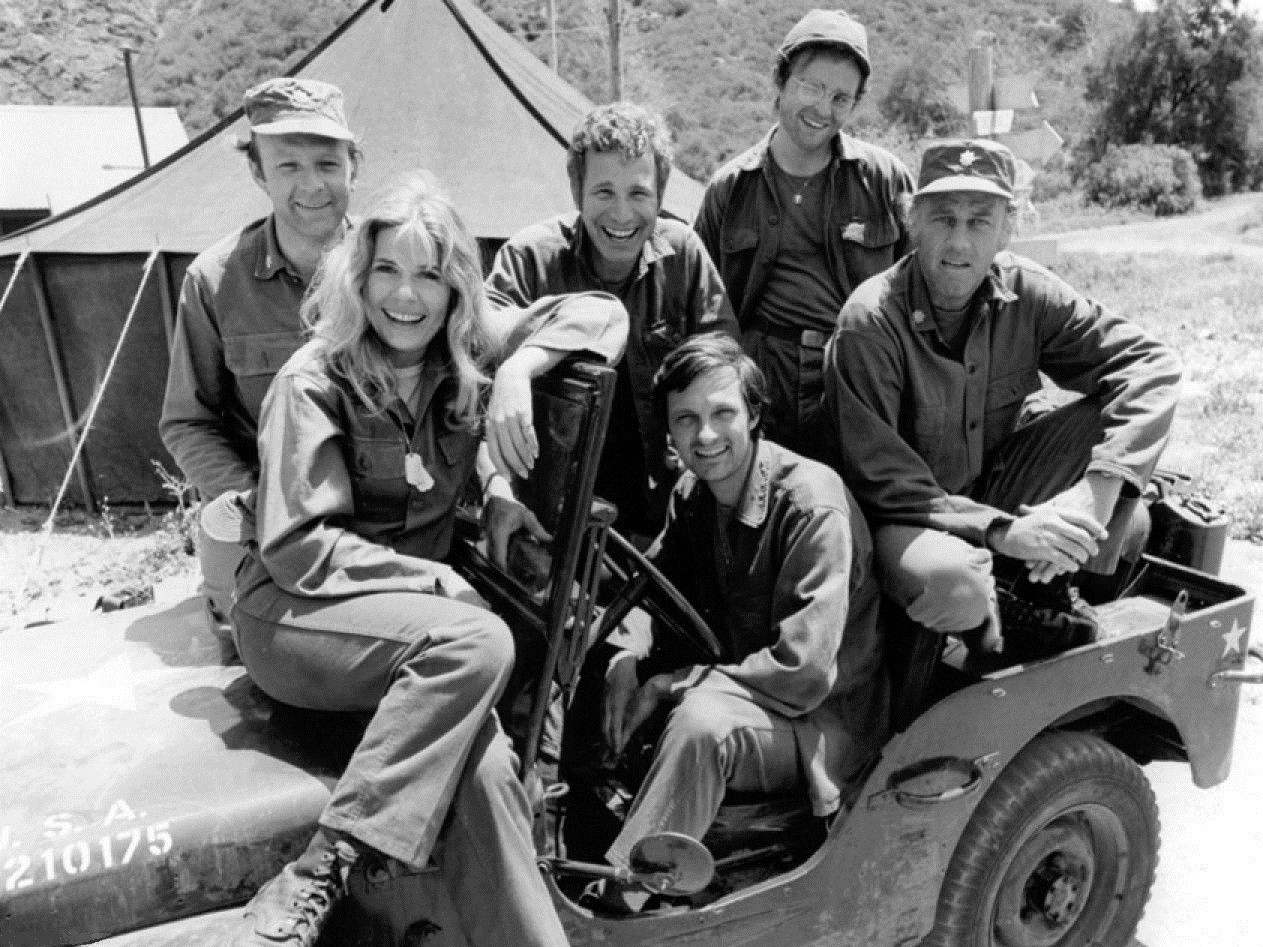
Larry Linville (left) with the cast of M*A*S*H in a pre-production photo from the third season (1974))

When the television series M*A*S*H was picked up for production in early 1972, Linville signed a five-year contract for the role of Major Frank Burns, an ill-tempered, inept surgeon who embraced military discipline with a cartoonish overzealousness. At the start of the series' fifth season in late 1976, Linville was offered a renewal for two more seasons, but declined. As the tone of the series had evolved to more serious storylines, and with the story arc of Loretta Swit's Major Houlihan character now expanding and turning away from her relationship with Frank Burns, Linville felt that he had taken the Burns character, which had become increasingly one-dimensional, as far as he could, and chose to leave the series to pursue other roles.

=== Later career ===
After M*A*S*H, Linville starred or appeared in many films and television series. He was a guest-star on many television series, most frequently Murder, She Wrote, Fantasy Island, The Love Boat, The FBI Story, and CHiPs. He also appeared on episodes of Airwolf (he played Maxwell in "And a Child Shall Lead") and The Rockford Files, and appeared in the television movie The Girl, the Gold Watch & Dynamite (1981). He also played a stock character—the "Crazy General"—along with Edward Winter in the pilot episode of Misfits of Science. He also co-starred in the short-lived sitcom Grandpa Goes to Washington with Jack Albertson.

Linville appeared as jealous ex-boyfriend Randy Bigelow in the short-lived 1982 Disney series Herbie, the Love Bug. He also starred in the short-lived The Jeffersons spinoff Checking In, where he played Florence Johnston's (Marla Gibbs) nemesis, Lyle Block; however, this series only lasted four episodes. In 1984, Linville co-starred on Paper Dolls, a nighttime drama on ABC offering a glimpse behind-the-scenes of the fashion industry. In 1991, Linville appeared on an episode of the television series Night Court as a doctor. Linville also appeared in an episode of Lois & Clark: The New Adventures of Superman season 1 episode 3 as a crackpot claiming to have been abducted by Superman and taken aboard his spaceship.

His film appearances included School Spirit (1985), Earth Girls Are Easy (1988), C.H.U.D. II: Bud the C.H.U.D. (1989), Rock 'n' Roll High School Forever (1991), A Million to Juan (1994), No Dessert, Dad, till You Mow the Lawn (1994), and Fatal Pursuit (1995).

Linville appeared as an interview subject for Memories of M*A*S*H, a 1991 special commemorating the 20th anniversary of the series. In 1997, he joined Larry Gelbart (the producer and creator of M*A*S*H) and David Ogden Stiers (who played Frank Burns' replacement on the sitcom, Major Charles Winchester) to attend a deactivation ceremony for the last remaining U.S. MASH unit in Korea.

== Marriages and family ==
He was married five times, including once to Kate Geer (daughter of actor Will Geer and sister of actress Ellen Geer), with whom he had a daughter before they divorced. He also married (and divorced) Vana Tribbey, Melissa Gallant, and Susan Hagan. His last marriage was to Deborah Guydon, who was by his side when he died.

== Surgery, illness, and death ==
After doctors found a malignant tumor under his sternum, Linville underwent surgery in February 1998 to remove part of his lung. He received further treatment, but had continuing health problems over the next two years. Linville died of pneumonia at Sloan-Kettering Cancer Center in New York City on April 10, 2000, after complications from cancer surgery. His ashes were scattered at sea off the coast of Bodega Bay, California.

== Filmography ==
=== Film ===
Year	Title	Role	Notes
1968	The Sweet Ride	Man Dancing in Club	Uncredited
1971	Kotch	Peter Stiel	
1971	Bunny O'Hare	Max (Collector #1)	
1972	The Stepmother	Dick Hill	
1985	School Spirit	President Grimshaw	
1988	Blue Movies	Dr. Gladding	
1989	Earth Girls Are Easy	Dr. Bob	
1989	C.H.U.D. II: Bud the C.H.U.D.	Dr. Jewell	
1991	Rock 'n' Roll High School Forever	Principal McGree	
1992	Body Waves	Himmel	
1994	A Million to Juan	Richard Dickerson	
1994	No Dessert, Dad, till You Mow the Lawn	J.J.	
1995	Angel's Tide		
1995	Fatal Pursuit	Shelby	
1997	Pressure Point	Neil Kennedy	
2004	West from North Goes South	Rev. Lowell	posthumous release

=== Television ===
Year	Title	Role	Notes
1968	The Doctors	Paul	Episode: #1.1405
1968	Judd, for the Defense	Martin Lederer	Episode: "The Ends of Justice"
1968–1970	Mannix	Lieutenant George Kramer / Detective Sergeant George Kramer	8 episodes
1969	The Outsider	Floyd Hendricks	Episode: "The Secret of Mareno Bay"
1969	Marcus Welby, M.D.	Dr. Beck / Doctor	2 episodes
1969	Bonanza	Lieutenant Will Tyler	Episode: "The Fence"
1969	Room 222	Counselor	Episode: "Arizona State Loves You"
1969–1970	Mission: Impossible	Colonel Leo Orlov / Alexi Silensky / Capt. Gulka	3 episodes
1969–1970	The F.B.I.	George Franciscus / George Tremont	2 episodes
1970	Here Come the Brides	Harry Miles	Episode: "Break the Bank of Tacoma"
1970	The Young Rebels	Reverend Wells	Episode: "The Ring of Freedom"
1970	The Young Lawyers	Bud Morton	Episode: "Remember Chris Gately?"
1971	Vanished	Walters	Television miniseries
1971	Men at Law		Episode: "Let the Dier Beware"
1971	Night Gallery	Sloane	Segment: "The Academy"
1972	The Night Stalker	Dr. Robert Makurji	TV movie
1972	Adam-12	Sgt. Hugh Brasher	Episode: "The Tip"
1972	O'Hara, U.S. Treasury	Det. Ed Pierce	Episode: "Operation: Deathwatch"
1972	The Sixth Sense	Roger Carver	Episode: "The House That Cried Murder"
1972	Cannon	Ed Barrows	Episode: "Bad Cats and Sudden Death"
1972	Search	Hugh Emery	Episode: "One of Our Probes Is Missing"
1972–1977	M*A*S*H	Maj. Frank Burns	120 episodes (Seasons 1–5)
1975	Kolchak: The Night Stalker	Captain Jonas	Episode: "Chopper"
1975	Rickles	Maj. Frank Burns	TV movie
1977	Calling Doctor Storm, M. D.	Dr. Jim Storm	TV movie
1977	The Rockford Files	Dr. Eric Albach	Episode: "A Deadly Maze"
1978	Barnaby Jones	Tom Watkins	Episode: "Deadly Sanctuary"
1978–1979	Grandpa Goes to Washington	Maj. Gen. Kevin Kelley	7 episodes
1979	Supertrain	Jack Nordoff	Episode: "And a Cup of Kindness Too"
1979	CHiPs	Carlin	2 episodes
1979	A Christmas for Boomer	Jack	TV movie
1979–1981	The Love Boat	Ty Younger / Lou Hayman	4 episodes
1980	Lou Grant	Thatcher	Episode: "Sting"
1980–1982	Fantasy Island	'Joe' Jonofoceles Armeniums Aristofeles / Jerome Pepper / Fred Webster	3 episodes
1981	Aloha Paradise		Episode: "Turn Me On/Treasure Hunt/A Child Will Become Father"
1981	The Jeffersons	Lyle Block	2 episodes
1981	Checking In	Lyle Block	4 episodes
1981	The Girl, the Gold Watch & Dynamite	Wesley Reins	TV movie
1982	Herbie, the Love Bug	Randy Bigelow	4 episodes
1983	Night Partners	Chief John Wilson	TV movie
1984	Paper Dolls	Grayson Carr	6 episodes
1985	Detective in the House	Mel	Episode: "Gelt by Association"
1985	Misfits of Science	Gen. Theil	Episode: "Deep Freeze (Pilot)"
1985	Airwolf	Clinton Maxwell	Episode: "And a Child Shall Lead"
1985	Riptide	Edgar Harrison	Episode: "Does Not Compute"
1985–1995	Murder, She Wrote	Paige Corbin / Lt. Steven Ames / Prof. Kent Radford	3 episodes
1987	The Law & Harry McGraw	Andrew Paxton	Episode: "Old Heroes Never Lie"
1988	Starting from Scratch	Brandon Shepherd	Episode: "James' Brother"
1991	Night Court	Dr. Nagelson	Episode: "To Sleep, No More"
1991	Dream On	Uncle Danny	Episode: "Toby or Not Toby"
1992	A Different World	Sen. Hutchinson	Episode: "Special Delivery"
1992–1993	Nurses	Himself / Mr. Garrett	2 episodes
1993	Lois & Clark: The New Adventures of Superman	Grover Cleveland	Episode: "Neverending Battle"
1995	Murder, She Wrote season 12	Corbin	Episode: “Unwilling Witness”
1997	Fast Track	Rusty Phillips	Episode: "Kennedy Gets a Ride"
1999	Crucible of Empire: The Spanish-American War	Theodore Roosevelt (voice)	documentary
1999	Great Performances	Everett Baker	Episode: "Crazy for You"
