= Sweezy v. New Hampshire =

- Supreme Court of the United States

Argued March 5, 1957 Decided June 17, 1957
- Full case name: Paul M. Sweezy v. State of New Hampshire by Louis C. Wyman, Attorney General
- Citations: 354 U.S. 234 (more) 77 S. Ct. 1203, 1 L. Ed. 2d 1311, 1957 U.S. LEXIS 655
- Argument: Oral argument

Case history
- Prior: Sweezy convicted, Merrimack County Superior Court (1954); aff'd in Wyman v. Sweezy, 100 N.H. 103, 121 A. 2d 783, (N.H. 1956); review denied, (N.H. 1956); cert. granted, 352 U.S. 812 (1956).
- Subsequent: Remanded to the New Hampshire Supreme Court; petition for rehearing denied, 355 U.S. 852 (1957).

Holding
- Due to the unknown government interest into Sweezy's lectures and the lack of legislative oversight of the investigation, appellant's conviction violated his right to due process.

Court membership
- Chief Justice Earl Warren Associate Justices Hugo Black · Felix Frankfurter; William O. Douglas · Harold H. Burton; Tom C. Clark · John M. Harlan II; William J. Brennan Jr. · Charles E. Whittaker

Case opinions
- Plurality: Warren, joined by Black, Douglas, Brennan
- Concurrence: Frankfurter, joined by Harlan
- Dissent: Clark, joined by Burton
- Whittaker took no part in the consideration or decision of the case.

Laws applied
- U.S. Const. amend. I, XIV

Sweezy v. New Hampshire, 354 U.S. 234 (1957), was a case before the United States Supreme Court in which the Court ruled that jailing an academic when he refused to answer questions about university lectures he had given was a violation of due process. On a larger scale, the decision established constitutional protections for academic freedom and reined in the investigative powers of state legislatures.

== Background ==
In 1951, the New Hampshire General Court, the legislature of New Hampshire, passed an act that empowered the New Hampshire Attorney General to investigate subversion; that act, the Subversive Activities Act of 1951, was codified into state law as RSA 588. The law provided for fines of up to $20,000 and imprisonment for twenty years for failing to cooperate with the Attorney General during an investigation. In 1953, the legislature amended the law to allow the Attorney General to sit as a one-man legislative committee, subpoenaing witnesses, requesting funding, and holding public or in camera sessions as he saw fit; thus delegated these powers, Attorney General Louis C. Wyman proceeded to begin his investigation of Communist subversion in New Hampshire later that year.

His investigation looked into the connections, backgrounds, and beliefs of individuals such as Elba Chase Nelson, a former Communist candidate for governor; Willard Uphaus, a theologian and director of the New Hampshire-based World Fellowship Center, Florence Luscomb, the architect and activist; and Paul Sweezy, an economist and magazine editor. The latter two both contributed to the socialist magazine Monthly Review and the magazine of the Socialist Union of America, The American Socialist.

Sweezy was a Marxist economist and the founding editor of the Monthly Review. In January 1954, he was subpoenaed by the state Attorney General to answer questions related to his connections to socialists and communists; he was later ordered to appear again in June, to discuss the notes of a March 22 lecture on Marxism he had delivered at the University of New Hampshire. In particular, Attorney General Wyman sought to discover Sweezy's beliefs about the inevitability of socialism, dialectical materialism, and whether Sweezy had advocated Marxism. At both times, Sweezy refused to answer particular questions related to his connections, the lecture, and Communism.

Following his refusal to answer questions, on June 30, Wyman had Sweezy found in contempt of court by the Merrimack County Superior Court, but freed on $1,000 bond, pending appeal. During the appeals process, Sweezy continued to lecture at the University of New Hampshire.

Sweezy appealed to the New Hampshire Supreme Court, which affirmed his conviction. After the Supreme Court of the United States decision in Pennsylvania v. Nelson, Sweezy requested a rehearing in the New Hampshire Supreme Court, which was denied.

Sweezy then appealed to the Supreme Court of the United States. At oral argument, Attorney General Wyman represented the state of New Hampshire.

== Opinion of the Court ==
Chief Justice Earl Warren delivered an opinion for a plurality of four justices, noting that the circumstances of the case, including an overly broad mandate for the Attorney General of New Hampshire, warranted a reversal of Sweezy's conviction. Though touching upon academic freedom tangentially, the plurality opinion did not go so far as to cite it as the whole basis whereby the Court ruled; rather, Warren's opinion noted that "the basic discretion of determining the direction of the legislative inquiry has been turned over to the investigative agency": that Wyman, as Attorney General, operated more or less without oversight from the legislative branch. In other words, due to the "sweeping and uncertain mandate" given to Wyman and "lack of any indications that the legislature wanted the information the Attorney General attempted to elicit from petitioner [Sweezy]", the government interest was unknown, and no direction was given regarding the objective of the investigation. As such, Sweezy's conviction violated his right to due process under the Fourteenth Amendment.

Justice Frankfurter, a former professor at Harvard Law School, wrote a concurrence that centered on the principles of academic freedom, and how they would be affected by governmental interference. Joined by Justice Harlan, Frankfurter noted that "a free society [depends] on free universities", and that institutions of higher education were shielded, in part, from the intervention of governmental authorities, which would be deleterious to the "intellectual life" of the university. He ultimately concluded that: "In the political realm, as in the academic, thought and action are presumptively immune from inquisition by political authority."

Justice Tom C. Clark dissented, joined by Justice Burton. Clark was concerned about how the majority opinion would affect the power of state legislatures to protect themselves against subversion, as well as conduct and oversee investigations.

Because Justice Whittaker was seated in late March 1957, after oral arguments had concluded, he took no part in the consideration or decision of the case.

== Aftermath ==
About a week after the decision, Attorney General Wyman, who held the rotating presidency of the National Association of Attorneys General that year, attacked the Court's decision during a meeting of attorneys-general in Idaho; one contemporary termed his attack "angry, hysterical, and unwarranted". Backed by the New Hampshire legislature, within twenty-three days of the ruling, Wyman asked the Supreme Court to re-hear the case; the Court denied his petition.

In his review at the end of the Supreme Court term, Luther Huston of The New York Times noted that this case involved "[a]cademic freedom of speech and belief", a fact with which later commentators have agreed.

Despite Sweezy's success before the high court, the Act continued to remain on the books until it was repealed in 1973.

== See also ==
- Watkins v. United States, a case decided that same day, focusing on the investigative powers of the United States Congress
- Yates v. United States, another case decided that day
- Keyishian v. Board of Regents, a case involving academic freedom and loyalty oaths
- List of United States Supreme Court cases involving the First Amendment
