= Thomas I. Emerson =

20th-century American attorney, legal scholar, and First Amendment advocate

- Born: Thomas Irwin Emerson; July 12, 1907; Passaic, New Jersey, U.S.
- Died: June 19, 1991 (aged 83); New Haven, Connecticut, U.S.
- Occupations: Lawyer, legal scholar
- Known for: Sweezy v. New Hampshire and Watkins v. United States (1957), Griswold v. Connecticut (1965)
- Board member of: National Lawyers Guild
- Awards: Roger N. Baldwin Medal of Liberty

Academic background
- Education: Yale University

Academic work
- Notable students: Catharine A. MacKinnon; Bill Clinton; Hillary Clinton; Robert Reich; Clarence Thomas
- Notable works: Political and Civil Rights in the United States (1952)

Thomas Irwin Emerson (1907–1991) was an American attorney and legal scholar. He is known as a "major architect of civil liberties law," "arguably the foremost First Amendment scholar of his generation," and "pillar of the Bill of Rights."

== Early life and education ==
Thomas Irwin Emerson was born in 1907 in Passaic, New Jersey. In 1928, he graduated from Yale University. In 1931, he graduated from Yale Law School, where future Supreme Court Justice William O. Douglas was one of his professors.

== Career ==
=== Private practice ===
In 1931, Emerson joined Engelhard, Pollak, Pitcher & Stern (earlier Simpson, Warren & Cardozo and later Engelhard, Pollak, Pitcher, Stern & Clarke). Emerson worked primarily for Carl Stern and Walter Pollak. Colleagues there included Arthur H. Goldberg. With law firm colleague Walter Pollak, Emerson assisted the defense team that helped appeal convictions of the "Scottsboro Boys" in Powell v. Alabama (1932).

=== Public service ===
In July 1933, Emerson joined the New Deal of US President Franklin Delano Roosevelt by serving at the National Recovery Administration (NRA), the National Labor Relations Board (NLRB), the Social Security Board (1936), back to the NLRB in the summer of 1937, becoming assistant general counsel in charge of their review section in November 1937 and associated general counsel in August 1939. He then joined the US Department of Justice. During World War II, he served as general counsel at the Office of Economic Stabilization and the Office of War Mobilization and Reconversion.

=== Academic ===
In 1946, Emerson returned to Yale as a professor of law, and taught there for more than three decades. Bill Clinton, Hillary Clinton, Robert Reich, and Clarence Thomas were among some of his students.

=== Politics ===
In 1948, Emerson ran for governor of Connecticut on the ticket of the 1948 Progressive Party, whose US presidential candidate was former US Vice President Henry A. Wallace. He was also Connecticut state chairman of the Progressive Party. In 1950, UN Ambassador Aleš Bebler planned to invite Henry A Wallace and Thomas I. Emerson to his country Yugoslavia.

=== Major cases ===
Emerson's successful argument before the United States Supreme Court include:

- 1957:
  - Sweezy v. New Hampshire (academic freedom related to Marxist economist Paul Sweezy)
  - Watkins v. United States (contempt of Congress by HUAC against First Amendment rights of John Thomas Watkins, United Auto Workers union official)
- 1965: Griswold v. Connecticut (contraceptives as part of privacy rights for Estelle Griswold of New Haven's Planned Parenthood Center)

During the 1960s, Emerson supported efforts to secure the release of Morton Sobell, convicted in 1951 of espionage as part of the case of Julius Rosenberg and Ethel Rosenberg.

=== Associations ===
Emerson was a member of the National Lawyers Guild and served as its national president (1950–1951). He refused to quit the organization when president, despite its labeling at a Communist front. Previously, he was a member of the International Juridical Association (IJA).

Emerson was also a member of the American Civil Liberties Union (ACLU), in which he was active, as well as the New Haven Civil Liberties Council (later Connecticut Civil Liberties Union). He also co-founded the Emergency Civil Liberties Committee (ECLC). He joined the National Committee to Abolish the House Un-American Activities Committee and also the National Committee Against Repressive Legislation; he opposed the Federal Loyalty Program of US President Harry S. Truman. His support for civil liberties led the Federal Bureau of Investigation to keep a file on him from 1941 to 1977.

=== Congressional testimony ===
On February 28, 1940, Emerson testified with other members of the NLRB, his case with regard to "the present state of the Board's docket, as far as concerns the question of delay in the issuance of Board decisions."

On April 4, 1950, Emerson appeared before HUAC as a representative of the 1948 Progressive Party.

In 1953, Emerson was mentioned in hearings of a House Select Committee to Investigate Tax-exempt Foundations and Comparable Organizations. The proceedings note allegedly subversive activities:

- 1930s: Co-authored "What is the I.J.A.?" by the International Juridical Association, "an offshoot of International Labor Defense," legal arm of the CPUSA
- 1940s: Co-sponsored the Southern Conference for Human Welfare, cited by HUAC in 1944 as a "Communist front"
- 1944: Served on committees of the National Lawyers Guild, cited by House Report No. 3123 of 1950 as "the foremost legal bulwark of the Communist Party
- 1948: Co-signed a letter in defense of the Jefferson School of Social Science, listed on the 1947 AGLOSO
- 1949:
  - Co-sponsored the Cultural and Scientific Conference for World Peace in New York City (March 25–27, 1949), held under the auspices of the National Council of the Arts, Sciences, and Professions
  - Spoke to the United Public Workers of America, a CIO union
  - Sponsored a meeting of the Civil Rights Congress, listed on the 1947 AGLOSO
- 1950:
  - Appeared before Congress on behalf of the Communist-backed 1948 Progressive Party
  - Co-signed a letter published in the Daily Worker to protest legal proceedings against lawyers defending CPUSA in the Foley Square trial
- 1951:
  - Signed a petition for the Joint Anti-Fascist Refugee Committee, listed on the 1947 AGLOSO
  - Received an award from the New York City Teachers Union, another communist front

== Personal life and death ==
Emerson married Bertha Paret, with whom he had three children. He remarried Ruth Calvin.

Thomas I. Emerson died age 83 on June 19, 1991, of a stroke at the Yale Health Services Center in New Haven.

== Awards ==
- 1952: Guggenheim Fellowship in Law
- 1983/4: Roger N. Baldwin Medal of Liberty from the ACLU

== Works ==
When Political and Civil Rights in the United States was published (during the McCarthy Era, renowned American education philosopher Robert Maynard Hutchins wrote, "This is the only comprehensive collection of cases and materials on the most important subject in the world today." The book foreshadowed the decision on Brown v. Board of Education (1952). In 2019, when co-author David Haber died, Rutgers University's Peter Simons, former dean of the law school there, stated: "David and Thomas I. Emerson produced the first casebook on civil rights and liberties, thus promoting a new field of study in law schools. That book has remained in use, updated and revised by Norman Dorsen and other scholars from NYU. ."

Works at the Library of Congress and cited in current references to this entry:

- "What is the I.J.A.?" (undated)
- "Loyalty Among Government Employees," Yale Law Journal with David M. Helfeld (1948)
- Political and Civil Rights in the United States with David Haber (1952)
- Toward a General Theory of the First Amendment (1963)
- "Freedom of Expression in Wartime" (1968)
- A System of Freedom of Expression (1970)
- The Bill of Rights Today (1970)
- "Freedom of the Press under the Burger Court" (1983)
- Young Lawyer for the New Deal: An Insider’s Memoir of the Roosevelt Years (1991)

(See "Thomas I. Emerson: Pillar of the Bill of Rights" for full bibliography.)

== See also ==
- Walter Pollak
- Sweezy v. New Hampshire
- Watkins v. United States
- Griswold v. Connecticut
- National Lawyers Guild

== External sources ==
- Thomas Irwin Emerson Papers (MS 1622). Manuscripts and Archives, Yale University Library.
- Guggenheim: undated photo of Thomas I. Emerson
