= Milliken v. Bradley =

- Supreme Court of the United States

Argued February 27, 1974 Decided July 25, 1974
- Full case name: Milliken, Governor of Michigan, et al. v. Bradley, et al.
- Citations: 418 U.S. 717 (more) 94 S. Ct. 3112; 41 L. Ed. 2d 1069; 1974 U.S. LEXIS 94

Case history
- Prior: Bradley v. Milliken, 433 F.2d 897 (6th Cir. 1970); 438 F.2d 945 (6th Cir. 1971); 338 F. Supp. 582 (E.D. Mich. 1971); 345 F. Supp. 914 (E.D. Mich. 1972); affirmed, 484 F.2d 215 (6th Cir. 1973); cert. granted, 414 U.S. 1038 (1973).
- Subsequent: On remand, Bradley v. Milliken, 402 F. Supp. 1096 (E.D. Mich. 1975); affirmed and remanded, 540 F.2d 229 (6th Cir. 1976); cert. granted, 429 U.S. 958 (1976); affirmed, 433 U.S. 267 (1977).

Holding
- The Court held that "[w]ith no showing of significant violation by the 53 outlying school districts and no evidence of any interdistrict violation or effect," the district court's remedy was "wholly impermissible" and not justified by Brown v. Board of Education (1954).

Court membership
- Chief Justice Warren E. Burger Associate Justices William O. Douglas · William J. Brennan Jr. Potter Stewart · Byron White; Thurgood Marshall · Harry Blackmun; Lewis F. Powell Jr. · William Rehnquist

Case opinions
- Majority: Burger, joined by Stewart, Blackmun, Powell, Rehnquist
- Concurrence: Stewart
- Dissent: Douglas
- Dissent: White, joined by Douglas, Brennan, Marshall
- Dissent: Marshall, joined by Douglas, Brennan, White

Laws applied
- U.S. Const. amend. XIV

Milliken v. Bradley, 418 U.S. 717 (1974), was a significant United States Supreme Court case dealing with the planned desegregation busing of public school students across district lines among 53 school districts in metropolitan Detroit. It concerned the plans to integrate public schools in the United States following the Brown v. Board of Education (1954) decision.

The ruling clarified the distinction between de jure and de facto segregation, confirming that segregation was allowed if it was not considered an explicit policy of each school district. In particular, the Court held that the school systems were not responsible for desegregation across district lines unless it could be shown that they had each deliberately engaged in a policy of segregation. It was the first Supreme Court decision to hold that a lower court's desegregation order was broader than needed to remedy the constitutional violation.

== Legal Background ==
=== School segregation in Detroit ===
Brown v. Board of Education was a landmark desegregation ruling, but difficult to implement, and only addressed the legal segregation that was common in the South. Some post-Brown desegreation decisions continued the process of integrating public facilities like city parks, recreation areas, and public beaches. Post-Brown education cases decided by the Supreme Court between 1968 and 1973 placed an affirmative duty on school boards to integrate.

Desegregation busing was upheld by the Supreme Court in Swann v. Charlotte-Mecklenburg (1971), but the policy was controversial. During the Great Migration, Detroit gained a large black population, but blacks were excluded from white neighborhoods, and experienced various forms of racist and discriminatory harassment. The impact of Detroit's racial history, including restrictive covenants, mob violence, and race riots, and the deterioration of the city's public schools in the 1970s has been extensively researched. Many factors contributed to school segregation in US cities, including white flight to suburbs, and discriminatory practices known as redlining that kept suburban home ownership out of reach for black families. Swann did not directly address housing discrimination and other practices that contributed to these demographic changes.

Some of the discriminatory policies in Detroit ended as public awareness increased and became more sensitive to the national civil rights movement, which began after World War II, and as black voting power in city precincts increased. The changes allowed Black people to move into additional neighborhoods in the city, but some neighborhoods resisted and for the most part little or no change of segregative practices occurred in the suburbs. The residential patterns in metropolitan Detroit at the time Milliken v. Bradley was decided all but guaranteed that most city schools would be "racially identifiable".

=== Procedural history ===
On August 18, 1970, the NAACP filed suit against Michigan state officials, including Governor William Milliken. The original trial began on April 6, 1971, and lasted for 41 days. The NAACP argued that although schools were not officially segregated (white only), the city of Detroit and the State as represented by its surrounding counties had enacted policies to increase racial segregation in schools. The NAACP also suggested a direct relationship between unfair housing practices (such as redlining) and educational segregation. District Judge Stephen J. Roth initially denied the plaintiffs' motion for a preliminary injunction.

The Sixth Circuit Court of Appeals ruled that the "implementation of the April 7 plan was [unconstitutionally] thwarted by State action in the form of the Act of the Legislature of Michigan" and remanded the case for an expedited trial on the merits.

On remand to the District Court, Judge Roth held the State of Michigan and the school districts accountable for the segregation, and ordered the implementation of a desegregation plan.

The Sixth Circuit Court of Appeals affirmed some of the decision, specifically the official segregation that had been practiced by the city's school district, but withheld judgment on the relationship of housing segregation with education. The Court specified that it was the state's responsibility to integrate across the segregated metropolitan area.

The accused officials appealed to the Supreme Court, which took up the case on February 27, 1974, to decide whether federal courts could remedy constitutional violations within the city of Detroit by busing students to schools in the suburbs.

== Supreme Court ==
=== Decision ===
The Supreme Court overturned the lower courts in a 5-to-4 decision, holding that desegregation orders were limited to the school district that had caused the segregation. After this decision, a multidistrict desegregation order was valid only if lower courts found that the suburban school districts had contributed to the segregation, or the redistricting was intentionally racist.

The plaintiffs argued that desegregation could not be achieved without the common desegregation order. However, the Sixth Circuit found that the constitutional violation, the disparate treatment of students on the basis of race, had occurred within the Detroit school district, and limited the "scope of the remedy" accordingly.

The court held that "[w]ith no showing of significant violation by the 53 outlying school districts and no evidence of any interdistrict violation or effect," the district court's remedy was "wholly impermissible" and not justified by Brown v. Board of Education. The Court noted that desegregation, "in the sense of dismantling a dual school system," did not require "any particular racial balance in each 'school, grade or classroom.'"

The Court also emphasized the importance of local control over the operation of schools.

=== Concurrence ===
Justice Potter Stewart wrote that federal courts could only remedy segregation when there was evidence that state power was a contributing factor, however assertions of segregation in fact caused by white flight, economic disadvantage and other demographic factors.

=== Dissents ===
Justice Thurgood Marshall's dissenting opinion stated that:

School district lines, however innocently drawn, will surely be perceived as fences to separate the races when, under a Detroit-only decree, white parents withdraw their children from the Detroit city schools and move to the suburbs in order to continue them in all-white schools.

Justice William O. Douglas's dissenting opinion stated that:

Today's decision ... means that there is no violation of the Equal Protection Clause though the schools are segregated by race and though the black schools are not only "separate" but "inferior."... Michigan by one device or another has over the years created black school districts and white school districts, the task of equity is to provide a unitary system for the affected area where, as here, the State washes its hands of its own creations.

== Impact of the case ==
The Supreme Court's decision required the City of Detroit's school district to redistribute the relatively small number of white students more widely across the district. According to Wayne State professor John Mogk, the decision also enabled the white flight that re-entrenched the city's segregation. The Detroit Public Schools became even more disproportionately black over the next two decades (with 90% black students in 1987). Detroit remains one of the most segregated cities in the US.

This result reaffirmed the national pattern of city schools attended mostly by Black people, with surrounding suburban schools mostly attended by Whites.

Post-Milliken claims for interdistrict relief attempted to show that redistricting unconstitutionally excluded black majority school districts. The Supreme Court refused to review one such desegregation plan in Delaware, and vacated a Seventh Circuit decision holding that public housing policies contributed to interdistrict segregation. Two years after Milliken the Supreme Court reaffirmed the limited scope of school desegregation orders in Pasadena Board of Education v. Spangler, and further limited city-wide busing in Dayton Board of Education v. Brinkman.

== See also ==
- Educational inequality in Southeast Michigan
