= M*A*S*H season 11 =

M*A*S*H
- Season 11
- No. of episodes: 16

Release
- Original network: CBS
- Original release: October 25, 1982 – February 28, 1983

Season chronology
- ← Previous; Season 10

The eleventh and final season of M*A*S*H aired Mondays at 9:00–9:30 pm ET on CBS, as part of the 1982–83 United States network television schedule.

== Cast ==
- Alan Alda as Capt. Benjamin Franklin "Hawkeye" Pierce
- Mike Farrell as Capt. B.J. Hunnicutt
- Harry Morgan as Col. Sherman T. Potter
- Loretta Swit as Maj. Margaret Houlihan
- David Ogden Stiers as Maj. Charles Emerson Winchester III
- Jamie Farr as Sgt. Maxwell Q. Klinger
- William Christopher as Capt. Father Francis Mulcahy

== Episodes ==
No. overall	No. in season	Title (Note: Titles taken from DVD)	Directed by (Note: Credits from episode title cards)	Written by	Original release date	Prod. code (Note: Production Code from end credits)
241	1	"Hey, Look Me Over"	Susan Oliver	Alan Alda and Karen Hall	October 25, 1982	1G-21
A notorious colonel's visit makes Margaret re-evaluate herself, while Kellye is fed up with Hawkeye seeing her as one of the boys and not a woman with a crush on him. The colonel is played by Peggy Feury in a guest appearance.
242	2	"Trick or Treatment"	Charles S. Dubin	Dennis Koenig	November 1, 1982	9-B01
The 4077th's Halloween party is sidetracked by wounded and a brawl that starts at Rosie's. A soldier declared dead by battalion aid isn't actually dead, and Richard Lineback plays a wounded soldier suffering from malnutrition because of survivor's guilt. Lineback had previously appeared in the Season 8 episode "Dear Uncle Abdul." George Wendt plays a Marine with a pool ball stuck in his mouth, and Andrew Dice Clay (billed as "Andrew Clay") plays another Marine who is attended to by B.J. for injuries incurred from driving into a chicken coop while drunk.
243	3	"Foreign Affairs"	Charles S. Dubin	David Pollock & Elias Davis	November 8, 1982	1G-22
An Army PR officer (Jeffrey Tambor) looks for a scoop worthy of propaganda when an enemy pilot lands near the 4077th — a reference to Operation Moolah — while Charles falls for a French Red Cross volunteer.
244	4	"The Joker Is Wild"	Burt Metcalfe	John Rappaport and Dennis Koenig	November 15, 1982	1G-24
B.J. is tired of hearing how great a prankster Trapper was, so he swears to pull the ultimate prank on the whole camp.
245	5	"Who Knew?"	Harry Morgan	Elias Davis & David Pollock	November 22, 1982	1G-18
Hawkeye volunteers to deliver the eulogy for a nurse no one actually knew, while Klinger seeks an investor for his latest invention — the hula hoop.
246	6	"Bombshells"	Charles S. Dubin	Dan Wilcox & Thad Mumford	November 29, 1982	9-B02
Hawkeye and Charles start a rumor that Marilyn Monroe is coming to the 4077th, while a sniper interrupts B.J.'s fishing trip and involves him in a helicopter rescue. Note — Marilyn Monroe visited Korea in February 1954. Baseball star Ted Williams' departure from Korea is mentioned as a current-events news item.
247	7	"Settling Debts"	Michael Switzer	Thad Mumford & Dan Wilcox	December 6, 1982	1G-23
Potter gets paranoid when his wife sends Hawkeye a letter, while B.J. treats a lieutenant paralyzed by a sniper.
248	8	"The Moon Is Not Blue"	Charles S. Dubin	Larry Balmagia	December 13, 1982	1G-20
Hawkeye and B.J. try to get a racy movie (The Moon Is Blue) to spice things up at the 4077th, while a wounded, teetotaling general declares last call for the officers' club. Note: "The Moon Is Blue" didn't come out until July 1953, far too late for MASH 4077 to immediately receive it.
249	9	"Run for the Money"	Nell Cox	Story by : Mike Farrell and Elias Davis & David Pollock; Teleplay by : Elias Davis & David Pollock	December 20, 1982	9-B03
Klinger depends on divine intervention when Father Mulcahy is chosen to race a veteran track star from another unit. During the race, the track star learns that Mulcahy is racing to raise money for the local orphanage, and the two hatch a scheme to get Klinger to donate all his money to the orphans with Mulcahy winning. Meanwhile, Charles stands up for a stuttering soldier, threatening to report his bullying CO for inhumanity. He befriends the man and cheers him up, giving him a copy of Moby Dick as a gift. It's revealed that Winchester's fabled sister, Honoria, is a stutterer herself and Winchester has a soft spot for others like her.
250	10	"U.N., the Night and the Music"	Harry Morgan	Elias Davis & David Pollock	January 3, 1983	9-B06
The 4077 is visited by a UN delegation consisting of an Indian officer who teaches yoga to Potter and Klinger, a Swedish delegate whom Margaret falls for, and a British officer who baits Charles, while B.J. feels guilty about not preparing a patient for the possibility of having a leg amputated.
251	11	"Strange Bedfellows"	Mike Farrell	Karen Hall	January 10, 1983	9-B07
While Charles angrily denies his incessant snoring, Potter inadvertently learns depressing news about his visiting son-in-law that reminds him of a mistake in his own past.
252	12	"Say No More"	Charles S. Dubin	John Rappaport	January 24, 1983	9-B08
Margaret contracts laryngitis on the eve of her meeting with a world-renowned surgeon, while a no-nonsense major general (John Anderson) sets up camp at the 4077th, where his son is being treated.
253	13	"Friends and Enemies"	Jamie Farr	Karen Hall	February 7, 1983	9-B05
An old Army buddy of Potter's (John McLiam) has caused unnecessary casualties by overstepping his boundaries. When Charles receives a new shipment of classical records and Margaret receives a new turntable with no records, B.J. plays the two against each other to rid the Swamp of Charles' music.
254	14	"Give and Take"	Charles S. Dubin	Dennis Koenig	February 14, 1983	9-B09
A wounded GI and the North Korean he shot end up bunked next to each other in post-op, while the position of charity-collection officer is passed around.
255	15	"As Time Goes By"	Burt Metcalfe	Dan Wilcox & Thad Mumford	February 21, 1983	9-B10
Margaret collects significant items for a time capsule, while B.J. and Rizzo play practical jokes on each other. Meanwhile, Klinger finds himself falling in love with a young South Korean woman (Rosalind Chao) mistaken for a sniper and separated from her refugee parents, while the time capsule items — including Radar's old teddy bear and a fishing lure that once belonged to Henry Blake — remind everyone of former colleagues and former patients alike.
256	16	"Goodbye, Farewell and Amen"	Alan Alda	Alan Alda; Burt Metcalfe; John Rappaport; Dan Wilcox & Thad Mumford; Elias Davis & David Pollock; Karen Hall	February 28, 1983	9-B04
Hawkeye is in a military mental hospital after suffering a nervous breakdown. Dr. Sidney Freeman helps Hawkeye to recover by facing the horror and pain he felt when a Korean mother smothered her baby to keep it quiet when a military bus faced peril from a North Korean patrol. As he returns to camp, the Korean War comes to an end. The staff of the 4077th tends to one final deluge of casualties, including Chinese musicians mentored by Winchester. B.J. gets orders to go home early but is forced back to the 4077th after he learns the orders were rescinded by the time he reaches Guam. The rest of the staff sorts out their personal problems before going their separate ways. Father Mulcahy tries to come to terms with the hearing trouble caused when a mortar shell exploded near him. Margaret awaits her stateside assignment and makes peace with Winchester, whose deep love of music has now been compromised forever. Potter leads an emotional farewell dinner where assorted staffers reveal their postwar plans. Hawkeye looks forward to a simple country doctor's life in his native village of Crabapple Cove, Maine. Klinger, after years of trying to get out of the Army, is staying in Korea to help Soon-Lee (Rosalind Chao) find her missing family. Klinger and Soon-Lee's wedding leads off the final scene where the staffers say their last emotional goodbyes to each other.
