= Hey, Look Me Over =

Hey, Look Me Over may refer to:

- "Hey, Look Me Over", a song from the musical Wildcat, whose tune was adapted into one of Louisiana State University's school songs, "Hey, Fightin’ Tigers"
- "Hey, Look Me Over" (M*A*S*H episode)
- "Hey, Look Me Over", an episode of The Golden Girls
