= Morey v. Doud =

- Supreme Court of the United States

Argued April 24, 1957 Decided June 24, 1957
- Full case name: Lloyd Morey, Auditor of Public Accounts of the State of Illinois, Latham Castle, Attorney General of the State of Illinois, and Benjamin S. Adamowski, State's Attorney of Cook County, Illinois, Appellants v. George W. Doud, et al., Doing Business as Bondified Systems, et al.
- Citations: 354 U.S. 457 (more) 77 S. Ct. 1354; 1 L. Ed. 2d 1485

Case history
- Prior: Complaint dismissed, Doud v. Hodge, 127 F. Supp. 853 (N.D. Ill. 1955); probable jurisdiction noted, 350 U.S. 814 (1955); vacated and remanded, 350 U.S. 485 (1956); on remand, 146 F. Supp. 887 (N.D. Ill. 1956); probable jurisdiction noted, 352 U.S. 923 (1956).

Holding
- A state may not grant a specific company an exception to the requirements of the law that is applicable to everyone else.

Court membership
- Chief Justice Earl Warren Associate Justices Hugo Black · Felix Frankfurter; William O. Douglas · Harold H. Burton; Tom C. Clark · John M. Harlan II; William J. Brennan Jr. · Charles E. Whittaker

Case opinions
- Majority: Burton, joined by Warren, Douglas, Clark, Brennan, Whittaker
- Dissent: Black
- Dissent: Frankfurter, joined by Harlan

Laws applied
- U.S. Const. Amend. XIV
- Overruled by
- City of New Orleans v. Dukes, 427 U.S. 297 (1976)

Morey v. Doud, 354 U.S. 457 (1957), was a U.S. Supreme Court case where Doud and two partners sold 'Bondified' brand money orders in Illinois, directly or through agents such as drug and grocery stores. A state law required any seller or issuer of money orders to secure a license and submit to state regulation, except that the statute, by name, explicitly exempted the American Express Company from these requirements.

Doud, his partners and one of his agents, fearing prosecution under the law, sued the state, arguing the law was unconstitutional. The Supreme Court agreed, finding the special exemption only for American Express violated the Equal Protection Clause of the Fourteenth Amendment.

It was overruled by City of New Orleans v. Dukes in 1976.

== See also ==
- List of United States Supreme Court cases, volume 354
