= City of New Orleans v. Dukes =

- Supreme Court of the United States

Argued November 11, 1975 Decided June 25, 1976
- Full case name: City of New Orleans, et al. v. Dukes, DBA Louisiana Concessions
- Citations: 427 U.S. 297 (more) 96 S.Ct. 2513; 49 L. Ed. 2d 511; 1976 U.S. LEXIS 75

Case history
- Prior: Appeal from the United States Court of Appeals for the Fifth Circuit, 501 F.2d 706 (5th Cir. 1974)

Holding
- New Orleans could rationally choose initially to eliminate vendors of more recent vintage. The “grandfather provision” does not violate the Equal Protection Clause of the Fourteenth Amendment.

Court membership
- Chief Justice Warren E. Burger Associate Justices William J. Brennan Jr. · Potter Stewart; Byron White · Thurgood Marshall; Harry Blackmun · Lewis F. Powell Jr. William Rehnquist · John P. Stevens

Case opinions
- Per curiam
- Concurrence: Marshall (in the judgment)
- Stevens took no part in the consideration or decision of the case.
- This case overturned a previous ruling or rulings
- Morey v. Doud, 354 U.S. 457 (1957)

City of New Orleans v. Dukes, 427 U.S. 297 (1976), was a 1976 United States Supreme Court decision.

== Background ==
The original case involved a 1972 New Orleans ordinance banning all pushcart food vendors in the French Quarter except those who had continuously operated there for eight or more years. Two vendors had done so for twenty years or more and qualified under the grandfather clause. Appellee Dukes had operated a pushcart for only two years and challenged the ordinance, winning in the lower courts.

== The decision ==
The City of New Orleans ordinance, authorized under state 'home rule' law, authorized under the Tenth Amendment State Police powers to protect the health, safety, welfare, and morals of its citizens - vs- Dukes' Fourteenth Amendment right of equal protection of the law:

The question for the court was whether the city of New Orleans' ordinance violated the equal protection clause of the 14th Amendment?

Per Curiam: No. Case was Reversed.

When local economic regulation is challenged solely as violating the Equal Protection Clause, this Court consistently defers to legislative determinations as to the desirability of particular statutory discriminations. Unless a classification trammels fundamental personal rights or is drawn upon inherently suspect distinctions such as race, religion, or alienage . . . any classifications other than these must only be rationally related to a legitimate state interest. . .States are accorded a wide latitude in the regulation of their local economies. . .

In short, the judiciary may not sit as a super legislature to judge the wisdom or desirability of legislative policy determinations made in areas that neither affect fundamental rights nor proceed along suspect lines.

[New Orleans] Classification rationally furthers the purpose which [the] city had identified as its objective in enacting the provision, that is, as a means 'to preserve the appearance and custom valued by the Quarter's residents and attractive to tourists.'
