= Yates v. United States =

- Supreme Court of the United States

Argued October 8–9, 1956 Decided June 17, 1957
- Full case name: Yates, et al. v. United States
- Citations: 354 U.S. 298 (more) 77 S. Ct. 1064; 1 L. Ed. 2d 1356; 1957 U.S. LEXIS 657

Case history
- Prior: 225 F.2d 146 (9th Cir. 1955); cert. granted, 350 U.S. 860 (1955).

Holding
- To violate the Smith Act, one must encourage others to take some action, not simply hold or assert beliefs.

Court membership
- Chief Justice Earl Warren Associate Justices Hugo Black · Felix Frankfurter; William O. Douglas · Harold H. Burton; Tom C. Clark · John M. Harlan II; William J. Brennan Jr. · Charles E. Whittaker

Case opinions
- Majority: Harlan, joined by Warren, Frankfurter; Black, Douglas (Part I, and partially as to Parts II and III); Burton (all but Part I)
- Concurrence: Burton (in part and in the judgment)
- Concur/dissent: Black, joined by Douglas
- Dissent: Clark
- Brennan, Whittaker took no part in the consideration or decision of the case.

Laws applied
- U.S. Const. amend. I, Smith Act

Yates v. United States, 354 U.S. 298 (1957), was a case decided by the Supreme Court of the United States that held that the First Amendment protected radical and reactionary speech, unless it posed a "clear and present danger".

== Background ==
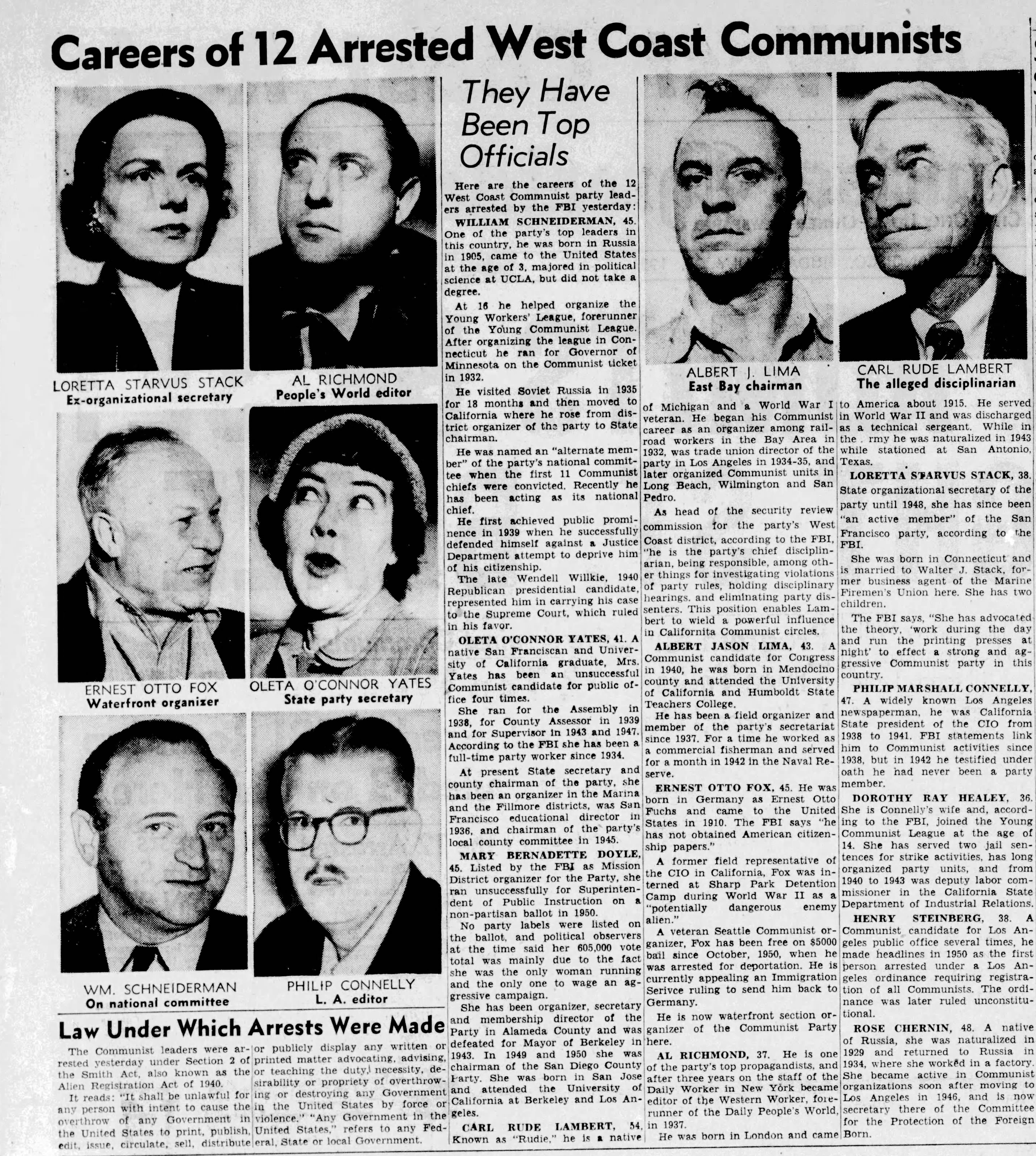
An article published in the San Francisco Chronicle profiling 12 of the West Coast Communists arrested under the Smith Act, July 27, 1951

Fourteen lower echelon officials of the Communist Party USA (CPUSA) were charged with violating the Smith Act by being members of the CPUSA in California. The Smith Act made it unlawful to advocate or organize the destruction or overthrow of any government in the United States by force. The appellants claimed that the Communist Party was engaged in passive political activities and that any violation of the Smith Act must involve active attempts to overthrow the government.

== Opinion ==
The Supreme Court of the United States ruled 6–1 to overturn the convictions. It construed the Smith Act narrowly, stating that the term "organize" meant to form an organization, not to take action on behalf of an organization. The Court drew a distinction between actual advocacy to action and mere belief. The Court ruled that the Smith Act did not prohibit "advocacy of the forcible overthrow of the government as an abstract doctrine". The Court recognized that "advocacy to action" circumstances would be "few and far between".

Writing for the majority, Justice John Marshall Harlan II introduced the notion of balancing society's right of self-preservation against the right to free speech. He wrote:

We are thus faced with the question whether the Smith Act prohibits advocacy and teaching of forcible overthrow as an abstract principle, divorced from any effort to instigate action to that end, so long as such advocacy or teaching is engaged in with evil intent. We hold that it does not. ... In failing to distinguish between advocacy of forcible overthrow as an abstract doctrine and advocacy of action to that end, the District Court appears to have been led astray by the holding in Dennis that advocacy of violent action to be taken at some future time was enough.

In a concurring opinion, Justice Hugo Black wrote:

Doubtlessly, dictators have to stamp out causes and beliefs which they deem subversive to their evil regimes. But governmental suppression of causes and beliefs seems to me to be the very antithesis of what our Constitution stands for. The choice expressed in the First Amendment in favor of free expression was made against a turbulent background by men such as Jefferson, Madison, and Mason – men who believed that loyalty to the provisions of this Amendment was the best way to assure a long life for this new nation and its Government. ... The First Amendment provides the only kind of security system that can preserve a free government – one that leaves the way wide open for people to favor, discuss, advocate, or incite causes and doctrines however obnoxious and antagonistic such views may be to the rest of us.

With respect to evidence required to convict in the absence of an appropriate standard, Black wrote:

The testimony of witnesses is comparatively insignificant. Guilt or innocence may turn on what Marx or Engels or someone else wrote or advocated as much as a hundred years or more ago. ... When the propriety of obnoxious or unfamiliar views about government is in reality made the crucial issue, ... prejudice makes conviction inevitable except in the rarest circumstances.

Yates did not rule the Smith Act unconstitutional, but limited its application to such a degree that it became nearly unenforceable. The Yates decision outraged some conservative members of Congress, who introduced legislation to limit judicial review of certain sentences related to sedition and treason, which did not pass.

To a large extent, the holding of the Yates case after the Dennis case reflects the judicial philosophy of Chief Justice Warren who advocates for greater freedom of speech in comparison to Fred M. Vinson.

The appellants' convictions were reversed and the case was remanded to District Court for a retrial.

== Reaction ==
The decision was announced on the same day as several other decisions in which communists were on the winning side, including Watkins v. United States and Sweezy v. New Hampshire (with the same majority and dissent). The day was called "Red Monday" by some anti-communists who disagreed with the decision. FBI Director J. Edgar Hoover called the decisions "the greatest victory the Communist Party in America ever received". President Eisenhower evaded questions about the decisions at a press conference, but wrote a letter to the Chief Justice after reports that he was "mad as hell" about them. The day was viewed as an indication of the Court's assertiveness under its new Chief Justice, with Time magazine headlining its coverage "U.S. Supreme Court: New Direction". Journalist I. F. Stone said the day "will go down in the history books as the day on which the Supreme Court irreparably crippled the witch hunt".

== See also ==
- Stack v. Boyle
- Smith Act trials of communist party leaders
- Brandenburg v. Ohio
- Hess v. Indiana
