= Carroll v. United States (1957) =

- Supreme Court of the United States

Argued April 4, 1957 Decided June 24, 1957
- Full case name: Leon F. Carroll and Daniel J. Stewart v. United States
- Citations: 354 U.S. 394 (more) 77 S. Ct. 1332; 1 L. Ed. 2d 1442

Case history
- Prior: United States v. Hall, 126 F. Supp. 620 (D.D.C. 1955); Reversed sub nom. United States v. Carroll, 234 F.2d 679 (D.C. Cir. 1956); Cert. granted, Carroll v. United States, 352 U.S. 906 (1956)

Holding
- The order of suppression of evidence in this case by the District Court is not appealable under the statutes of the federal appeals courts; therefore, the appeal should've been dismissed.

Court membership
- Chief Justice Earl Warren Associate Justices Hugo Black · Felix Frankfurter; William O. Douglas · Harold H. Burton; Tom C. Clark · John M. Harlan II; William J. Brennan Jr. · Charles E. Whittaker

Case opinion
- Majority: Warren, joined by unanimous

Carroll v. United States, 354 U.S. 394 (1957), was a federal court case dealing with the appealability of a suppression order issued by the Federal District Court for the District of Columbia for an unlawful warrant under the Fourth Amendment.

== Background ==
In February 1957, officers arrested Carroll and Stewart on John Doe arrest warrants for violations of local lottery laws. During the detainment, officers conducted a Search Incident to Arrest and seized evidence from their person. Attorneys petitioned the District Court for suppression of the evidence on grounds that the warrants were null and void due to the lack of constitutionally-required probable cause under the Fourth Amendment to the U.S. Constitution. The District Court granted the petition. The Government appealed to the Federal Court of Appeals, which reversed the suppression order.

In a unanimous 9–0 opinion written by Justice Warren, the Supreme Court of the United States reversed the Court of Appeals, stating that:

𝐼𝑡 𝑖𝑠 𝑎𝑥𝑖𝑜𝑚𝑎𝑡𝑖𝑐, 𝑎𝑠 𝑎 𝑚𝑎𝑡𝑡𝑒𝑟 𝑜𝑓 ℎ𝑖𝑠𝑡𝑜𝑟𝑦 𝑎𝑠 𝑤𝑒𝑙𝑙 𝑎𝑠 𝑑𝑜𝑐𝑡𝑟𝑖𝑛𝑒, 𝑡ℎ𝑎𝑡 𝑡ℎ𝑒 𝑒𝑥𝑖𝑠𝑡𝑒𝑛𝑐𝑒 𝑜𝑓 𝑎𝑝𝑝𝑒𝑙𝑙𝑎𝑡𝑒 𝑗𝑢𝑟𝑖𝑠𝑑𝑖𝑐𝑡𝑖𝑜𝑛 𝑖𝑛 𝑎 𝑠𝑝𝑒𝑐𝑖𝑓𝑖𝑐 𝑓𝑒𝑑𝑒𝑟𝑎𝑙 𝑐𝑜𝑢𝑟𝑡 𝑜𝑣𝑒𝑟 𝑎 𝑔𝑖𝑣𝑒𝑛 𝑡𝑦𝑝𝑒 𝑜𝑓 𝑐𝑎𝑠𝑒 𝑖𝑠 𝑑𝑒𝑝𝑒𝑛𝑑𝑒𝑛𝑡 𝑢𝑝𝑜𝑛 𝑎𝑢𝑡ℎ𝑜𝑟𝑖𝑡𝑦 𝑒𝑥𝑝𝑟𝑒𝑠𝑠𝑙𝑦 𝑐𝑜𝑛𝑓𝑒𝑟𝑟𝑒𝑑 𝑏𝑦 𝑠𝑡𝑎𝑡𝑢𝑡𝑒.

The Court held that, although some orders may be appealable under the authority of 18 U.S.C. 1291, this order in this case lacked such authority. The Circuit Court was reversed and the case remanded.
