= Holmes v. City of Atlanta =

Holmes v. Atlanta
- Supreme Court of the United States

Decided November 7, 1955
- Full case name: Holmes, et al. v. City of Atlanta, et al.
- Citations: 350 U.S. 879 (more) 76 S. Ct. 141; 100 L. Ed. 776; 1955 U.S. LEXIS 176

Case history
- Prior: Holmes et al. v. City of Atlanta, 223 F.2d 93 (5th Cir. 1955).

Holding
- Held that the practice of the City of Atlanta of operating a golf course that was open to different races on different days was improper.

Court membership
- Chief Justice Earl Warren Associate Justices Hugo Black · Stanley F. Reed; Felix Frankfurter · William O. Douglas; Harold H. Burton · Tom C. Clark; Sherman Minton · John M. Harlan II

Case opinion
- Per curiam

Holmes v. Atlanta, 350 U.S. 879 (1955), was a per curiam order by the Supreme Court of the United States that summarily reversed an order by the Georgia Court of Appeals that permitted the city of Atlanta to allocate a municipal golf course to different races on different days. The case was remanded to the district court with directions to enter a decree in conformity with Mayor and City Council of Baltimore City v. Dawson.
