= Butler v. Michigan =

- Supreme Court of the United States

Argued October 16, 1956 Decided February 25, 1957
- Full case name: Butler v. Michigan
- Citations: 352 U.S. 380 (more)
- Argument: Oral argument

Case history
- Prior: Defendant convicted of violating Michigan Penal Code. Appealed to the Michigan Supreme Court, which upheld the conviction.

Holding
- Laws that ban the sale to adults of reading material due to its perceived inappropriateness for children violate the Due Process Clause of the Fourteenth Amendment. Michigan Supreme Court reversed.

Court membership
- Chief Justice Earl Warren Associate Justices Hugo Black · Felix Frankfurter; William O. Douglas · Harold H. Burton; Tom C. Clark · John M. Harlan II

Case opinions
- Majority: Frankfurter, joined by Warren, Douglas, Clark, Harlan, Burton, Reed, Brennan
- Concurrence: Black

Laws applied
- U.S. Const. amend. XIV

Butler v. Michigan, 352 U.S. 380 (1957), was a U.S. Supreme Court decision in which the court held that laws criminalizing the sale of non-obscene literature to adults based on its perceived unsuitability for children were unconstitutional on the grounds of the Due Process Clause of the Fourteenth Amendment. Felix Frankfurter's majority opinion in the case has often been cited for its use of the "burn the house to roast the pig" quip. Though overshadowed by other landmark free speech decisions from the Warren Court, Butler v. Michigan has been described by contemporary scholars as a "key free speech victory" and the decision is considered to mark the end of harm to youth as a rationale for official censorship and regulation of printed matter.

== Background ==
Alfred Butler was the district sales manager in Detroit for Pocket Books. Seeking to challenge Detroit's notoriously repressive censorship laws and the influence of the National Organization for Decent Literature he deliberately sold a copy of John Howard Griffin's The Devil Rides Outside to a Detroit police officer, was arrested, and fined $100. His appeal to have the case dismissed at the local level was denied, and he appealed to the Michigan Supreme Court for relief but was also denied. Butler then appealed to the Supreme Court. The American Book Publishers Council, Authors League of America, and the Detroit branch of the American Civil Liberties Union filed amicus briefs in support of Butler, while the attorney general and assistant attorney general of Texas filed briefs urging the Supreme Court to reject Butler's appeal.

== Opinion of the Court ==
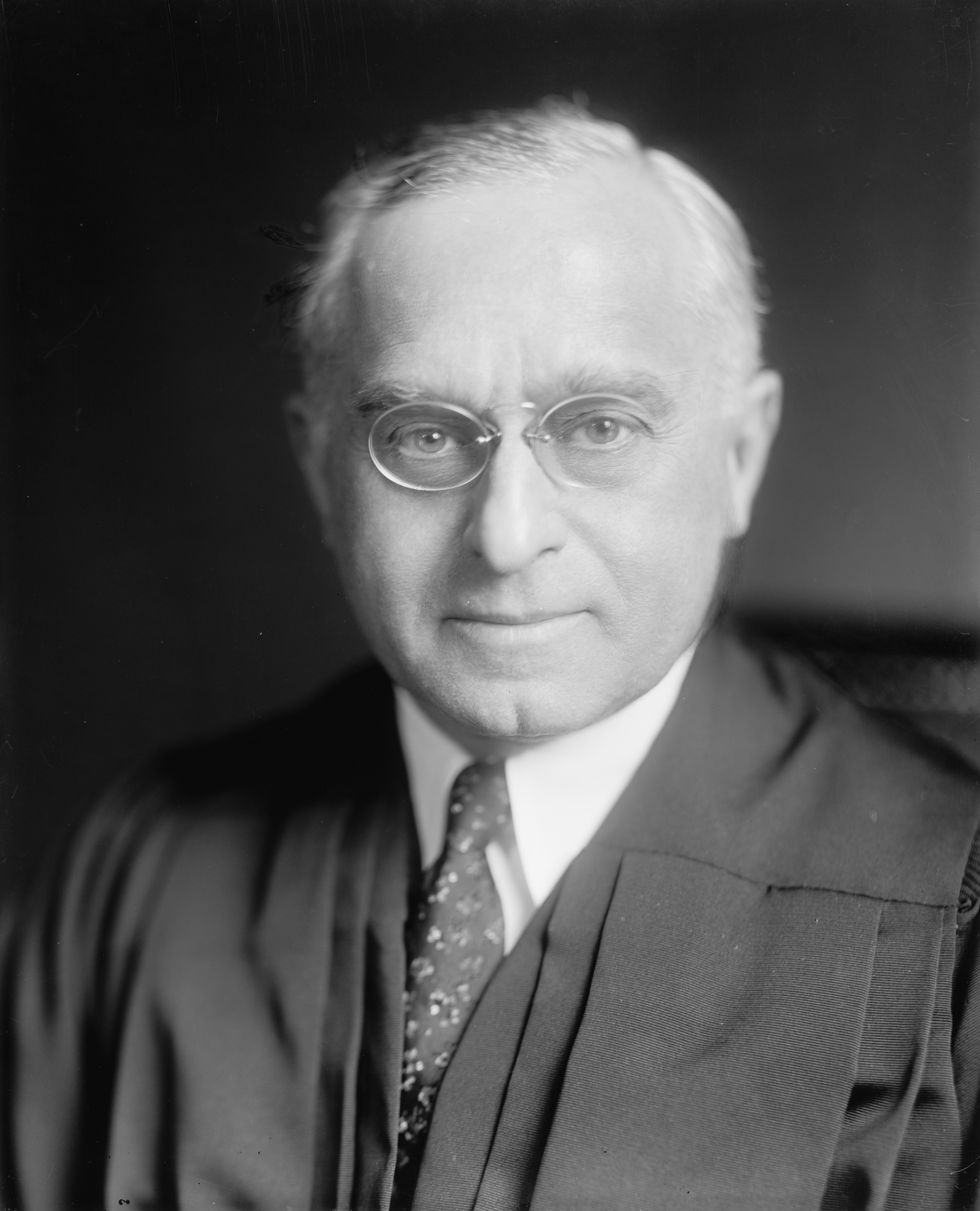
Official portrait, Felix Frankfurter, 1939

Justice Felix Frankfurter delivered the opinion of the unanimous court, where he rejected the suitability of the Michigan law in terms of protecting the innocence of youth: "The State insists that, by thus quarantining the general reading public against books not too rugged for grown men and women in order to shield juvenile innocence, it is exercising its power to promote the general welfare. Surely, this is to burn the house to roast the pig." The court struck down the Michigan law on the grounds of the Fourteenth, rather than First Amendment, insisting that reducing the adult population of Michigan to only reading what was appropriate for children was a violation of their individual rights. Frankfurter had previously dissented in Winters v. New York regarding the general ability of a state to control crime via regulation of printed matter, and said that principle did not apply to this case. Hugo Black concurred without writing a separate opinion.

== Legacy ==
Clay Calvert, founder of the First Amendment Project at the University of Florida, commented that despite the decision being overshadowed by later free speech cases such as New York Times Co. v. Sullivan, Tinker v. Des Moines Independent Community School District, and Brandenburg v. Ohio, Butler represented a key shift in American jurisprudence that the government could not use the guise of protecting minors from objectionable content to "reduce the scope of speech available to consenting adults." According to Calvert and others, it also marked the end of attempts to censor of print material for the sake of children. He inferred that the precedential roots of Frankfurter's opinion lay in Judge Learned Hand's opinion in the relatively obscure United States v. Kennerley case, which also dealt with literary obscenity. Though Hand personally disagreed with the antiquated British Hicklin test (used in the United States to judge obscene literature until 1957), and upheld the decision in the case, he remarked on the appropriateness of using harm to children as a rationale for censorship:

I question whether in the end men will regard that as obscene which is honestly relevant to the adequate expression of innocent ideas, and whether they will not believe that truth and beauty are too precious to society at large to be mutilated in the interests of those most likely to pervert them to base uses. Indeed, it seems hardly likely that we are even to-day so lukewarm in our interest in letters or serious discussion as to be content to reduce our treatment of sex to the standard of a child's library in the supposed interest of a salacious few, or that shame will for long prevent us from adequate portrayal of some of the most serious and beautiful sides of human nature.

— Judge Learned Hand, United States v. Kennerley, 209 F. 119 (S.D.N.Y. 1913), cited in Calvert, 256

Frankfurter's "burn the house to roast the pig" quip went on to be used in many subsequent cases, including Sable Communications of California v. FCC and by the District of Columbia judge overturning the FCC's response to George Carlin's seven dirty words sketch, which would later be part of the landmark FCC v. Pacifica Foundation case. The opinion has sometimes been considered the source of the quip, which in actuality is a reference to Charles Lamb's 1822 comic essay, "A Dissertation Upon Roast Pig," and had been used previously, including by Frankfurter himself. John Paul Stevens referenced the case in his dissenting opinion for Ashcroft v. American Civil Liberties Union.
