= The Moon Is Not Blue =

- M*A*S*H episode
- Episode no.: Season 11; Episode 8
- Directed by: Charles S. Dubin
- Written by: Larry Balmagia
- Production code: 1G20
- Original air date: December 13, 1982

Guest appearances
- Hamilton Camp; Sandy Helberg; Larry Ward

Episode chronology
← Previous "Settling Debts"	Next → "Run for the Money"
- M*A*S*H season 11

"The Moon Is Not Blue" was the 248th episode of the M*A*S*H television series, and the eighth of season eleven. The episode aired on December 13, 1982 on CBS.

== Plot ==
Everyone is frustrated by the unrelenting hot weather, and Hawkeye and B.J. are bored with the movies the unit is sent. After reading about a newly released movie The Moon Is Blue and its supposedly salacious content in a Boston newspaper, they decide it's the movie they want sent to the camp. They are determined to get their hands on this film, despite being warned not to get their expectations up by Charles Winchester, who tells them not to put too much stock in the fact that the film is "Banned in Boston" because Boston would ban Pinocchio. They attempt to pull strings with the delivery driver, Corporal Bannister, in exchange for pills (placebos sent to the hospital in error) to help him control his nerves in advance of a date. He leads them to the Major Frankenheimer, who agrees to send the movie if Hawkeye and B.J. can get hold of a copy on his behalf. When the movie arrives, Frankenheimer goes against his word and schedules the movie to be sent to his "A-list" first. Bannister helps them by switching labels on the movie can with State Fair, only to have the switch backfire when their request for the film is approved and State Fair is sent to camp.

Some weeks later, The Moon Is Blue arrives at the camp and is screened to a full house. Hawkeye and B.J. are disappointed by its lack of promised sexually explicit content which is not good for family audiences. Hawkeye declares that he's never seen a cleaner movie in his life. Father Mulcahy points out that "One of the actors did say 'virgin'", to which Hawkeye replies, exasperated, "That's because everyone was!"

== Historical notes ==
Ingo Preminger, producer of the theatrical version of MASH, is the brother of Otto Preminger, director of The Moon Is Blue.

The Moon is Blue was released in the USA on July 8, 1953, only nineteen days before the armistice for the Korean War was signed. The episode plot suggests the action took place over a considerably longer time, and there is no mention of the end of the war being in sight.

Harry Morgan, who played Colonel Potter on M*A*S*H, has a small role early in the film State Fair as a ring-toss operator.

High Noon was a 1952 movie with Gary Cooper and would have been a year old when The Moon is Blue was released.

Hawkeye's "revenuers" comment, after the still is confiscated, refers to the U.S. Prohibition agents who worked indirectly for the United States Bureau of Internal Revenue, a plot common to the 1950s Appalachian-themed cartoon comics, Li'l Abner, and Barney Google and Snuffy Smith.

Busby Berkeley was a choreographer and movie director in the early to mid-20th Century. Hawkeye references him when he sees all the movie posters in Frankenheimer's office.
