= Bombshells (M*A*S*H) =

- M*A*S*H episode
- Episode no.: Season 11; Episode 6
- Directed by: Charles S. Dubin
- Written by: Dan Wilcox; Thad Mumford
- Production code: 9B02
- Original air date: November 29, 1982

Guest appearance
- Gerald S. O'Loughlin

Episode chronology
← Previous "Who Knew?"	Next → "Settling Debts"
- M*A*S*H season 11

"Bombshells" is the sixth episode of the eleventh season of the television series M*A*S*H, and the 246th episode overall. It first aired on November 29, 1982 on CBS. In it, Hawkeye and Charles attempted to get Marilyn Monroe to visit the 4077th, while B.J. receives the Bronze Star for a deed he believes was far from heroic. The episode was written by Dan Wilcox and Thad Mumford and directed by Charles S. Dubin.

== Plot synopsis ==
Hawkeye and Charles, annoyed by the unending rumor mill, start a story that Marilyn Monroe will be visiting the 4077th to thank them for saving the life of her cousin. They soon find themselves in hot water when people start to believe it, including Col. Potter. They desperately try to arrange for Marilyn to appear, with Hawkeye going so far as to try to contact her by phone pretending to be Ted Williams. However, they are ultimately unsuccessful, and end up having to send a faked telegram purportedly from Marilyn apologizing for not being able to appear.

Meanwhile, B.J. has a chopper pilot take him out on a fishing trip. On the flight, they encounter a wounded soldier. They land and place him on a landing pad stretcher. As they fly up they encounter a second wounded soldier. B.J. throws the soldier a rope to haul him up into the helicopter, but at that moment the chopper is besieged by enemy fire. At the pilot's frantic behest, B.J. ends up cutting the rope and abandoning the wounded man as the chopper flies off. The pilot is impressed by B.J.'s valiant attempt to save the soldier and recommends him for a commendation; shortly thereafter, B.J. is notified he is to receive the Bronze Star. Far from gratified, B.J. is disgusted with himself for putting his own welfare first and possibly leaving a wounded man to die; he also remarks that he can no longer consider himself morally superior to those he operated on: "The minute I cut that line they made me a soldier." He eventually gives the medal to another patient.

Gerald S. O'Loughlin guest stars as General Franklin Schwerin.

== Analysis ==
This episode has been held up as an example of the changing sociopolitical views embodied by its characters, in this instance from more to less anti-authoritarian.
