= Carter's Army =

- The movie cover for Carter's Army, which was released on DVD as Black Brigade.
- Also known as: Black Brigade
- Genre: Drama; War
- Written by: Aaron Spelling; David Kidd
- Directed by: George McCowan
- Starring: Stephen Boyd; Roosevelt Grier; Robert Hooks; Susan Oliver; Richard Pryor
- Music by: Fred Steiner
- Country of origin: United States
- Original language: English

Production
- Executive producers: Aaron Spelling; Danny Thomas
- Producers: Aaron Spelling; Shelley Hull
- Cinematography: Archie R. Dalzell
- Editor: George W. Brooks
- Running time: 70 minutes
- Production company: Thomas/Spelling Productions

Original release
- Network: ABC
- Release: January 27, 1970

Carter's Army is a 1970 American made-for-television war drama film starring a host of prominent African-American film actors, including Richard Pryor, Rosey Grier, Robert Hooks, Billy Dee Williams and Moses Gunn. The film originally aired as an ABC Movie of the Week on January 27, 1970.

The film would be released on DVD under the title Black Brigade.

== Plot ==
A redneck officer is put in charge of a squad of all black troops charged with the mission of securing an important hydro dam in Nazi Germany. Their failure would delay the Allied advance into Germany, thus prolonging the war. These African-Americans had been relegated to cleaning latrines and therefore have little real military training, but Captain Beau Carter has no choice. He leads the rag-tag unit to secure the dam and the men reveal themselves as heroic.

== Cast ==
- Stephen Boyd as Captain Beau Carter
- Robert Hooks as Lieutenant Edward Wallace
- Susan Oliver as Anna Renvic
- Rosey Grier as Jim "Big Jim"
- Moses Gunn as Private "Doc" Hayes
- Richard Pryor as Private Jonathan Crunk
- Glynn Turman as Private George Brightman
- Billy Dee Williams as Private Lewis
- Paul Stewart as Brigadier General Clark

== Production ==
It was shot on location in Mount Pinos.
