= Pure speech =

Pure speech in United States law is the communication of ideas through spoken or written words or through conduct limited in form to that necessary to convey the idea. It is distinguished from symbolic speech, which involves conveying an idea or message through behavior. Pure speech is accorded the highest degree of protection under the First Amendment to the U.S. Constitution.

== See also ==
- Strict scrutiny
- Winters v. New York
