= Ullmann v. United States =

- Supreme Court of the United States

Argued December 6, 1955 Decided March 26, 1956
- Full case name: William Ludwig Ullmann v. United States
- Citations: 350 U.S. 422 (more) 76 S. Ct. 497; 100 L. Ed. 511; 1956 U.S. LEXIS 1631; 53 A.L.R.2d 1008

Court membership
- Chief Justice Earl Warren Associate Justices Hugo Black · Stanley F. Reed; Felix Frankfurter · William O. Douglas; Harold H. Burton · Tom C. Clark; Sherman Minton · John M. Harlan II

Case opinions
- Majority: Frankfurter, joined by Warren, Reed, Burton, Clark, Minton, Harlan
- Concurrence: Reed
- Dissent: Douglas, joined by Black

Ullmann v. United States, 350 U.S. 422 (1956), was a United States Supreme Court case in which the court held that a person given immunity from prosecution loses their Fifth Amendment right against self-incrimination, thus upholding the Constitutionality of the Immunity Act of 1954.

The Court stated, "This command of the Fifth Amendment ('nor shall any person . . . be compelled in any criminal case to be a witness against himself. . . .') registers an important advance in the development of our liberty — 'one of the great landmarks in man's struggle to make himself civilized.' "
