= Mastro Plastics Corp. v. NLRB =

Mastro Plastics Corporation v. National Labor Relations Board
- Supreme Court of the United States

Decided February 27, 1956
- Full case name: Mastro Plastics Corp. v. NLRB
- Citations: 350 U.S. 270 (more)

Holding
- When an employer has committed an unfair labor practice, strikes in protest of that practice are protected by the NLRA even when the collective bargaining agreement includes a no-strike clause.

Court membership
- Chief Justice Earl Warren Associate Justices Hugo Black · Stanley F. Reed; Felix Frankfurter · William O. Douglas; Harold H. Burton · Tom C. Clark; Sherman Minton · John M. Harlan II

Case opinions
- Majority: Burton
- Dissent: Frankfurter, joined by Minton, Harlan

Laws applied
- National Labor Relations Act

Mastro Plastics Corporation v. National Labor Relations Board, 350 U.S. 270 (1956), was a United States Supreme Court case in which the court held that, when an employer has committed an unfair labor practice, strikes in protest of that practice are protected by the National Labor Relations Act even when the collective bargaining agreement includes a no-strike clause.
