= Winters v. New York =

- Supreme Court of the United States

Argued March 27, 1946 Reargued November 19, 1946 Reargued November 10, 1947 Decided March 29, 1948
- Full case name: Winters v. People of State of New York
- Citations: 333 U.S. 507 (more)

Case history
- Prior: Defendant convicted and appealed to the New York Supreme Court and Court of Appeals of New York, which upheld conviction.

Holding
- A New York Penal Code statute that forbade the publication of literature "made up of news or stories of criminal deeds of bloodshed or lust" was so vaguely applied that it violated the First Amendment, as applied to the states through the 14th Amendment. New York Supreme Court and Court of Appeals of New York reversed.

Court membership
- Chief Justice Fred M. Vinson Associate Justices Hugo Black · Stanley F. Reed; Felix Frankfurter · William O. Douglas; Frank Murphy · Robert H. Jackson; Wiley B. Rutledge · Harold H. Burton

Case opinions
- Majority: Reed, joined by Black, Douglas, Stone, Murphy, Rutledge
- Dissent: Frankfurter, joined by Jackson, Burton

Laws applied
- U.S. Const. amend. XIV, U.S. Const. amend. I

Winters v. New York, 333 U.S. 507 (1948), was a U.S. Supreme Court decision in which the Court ruled that a section of New York Penal Law that banned the publication of periodicals dealing in criminal deeds was vaguely applied enough to violate the First Amendment vis-a-vis the Fourteenth Amendment. The case later played an important precedential role in cases dealing with bans on the sale of literature, such as Butler v. Michigan, and provided important First Amendment defenses for comic books and other literature that was criticized during the 1950s.

== Background ==
Subsection 2 of §1141 of the New York Penal Law held that distribution of periodicals "principally made up of criminal news, police reports, or accounts of criminal deeds, or pictures, or stories of deeds of bloodshed, lust or crime" was grounds for a misdemeanor conviction. Murray Winters, a New York City newsdealer, was convicted under this provision for selling a true-crime tabloid named Headquarters Detective. He appealed his conviction to both the New York Court of Appeals as well as the New York Supreme Court, which both upheld his conviction. The New York Supreme Court upheld his fine, comparing the magazine negatively to Charles Biro and Lev Gleason Publications' Crime Does Not Pay. The Authors League of America and the American Civil Liberties Union filed amicus briefs urging the reversal of Winters' conviction.

== Opinion of the Court ==
The Supreme Court, in a 6-3 decision, overturned Winters' conviction. Justice Stanley Forman Reed delivered the opinion of the court, which recognized the importance of state police power to reduce crime but ultimately held that the statute was too vague and would potentially outlaw the sale of war stories.

=== Frankfurter's dissent ===
Justice Felix Frankfurter penned a dissent joined by Robert H. Jackson and Harold H. Burton, which mainly objected to the wide-ranging precedent set by the case that he felt would invalidate many similar laws across the country. He and the other dissenting justices felt that New York was within its rights to regulate the publication of crime stories as it did.

== Later cases ==
Winters provided a precedent that protected non-obscene literature and comic books from censorship. At the time of the decision, Mutual Film Corp. v. Industrial Commission of Ohio (1915), which ruled that the First Amendment did not apply to the film industry, was still in effect and would not be overturned until Joseph Burstyn, Inc. v. Wilson in 1952. A National Lawyers Guild brief filed in Burstyn v. Wilson cited Winters as well as the earlier case Hannegan v. Esquire, Inc. to challenge the constitutionality of the New York law under question in that case, stating that, between those two cases, "[the Supreme Court] repudiated the proposition that the freedom of the press may be denied communications [sic] originated for the purposes of entertainment."

The case also affected United States jurisprudence regarding state definitions of obscenity by mandating that these laws be more concretely worded. United States jurisprudence regarding obscenity would undergo a major change with the landmark Roth v. United States case in 1957.

== See also ==
- Censorship in the United States
- Pure speech
- Red scare
