= Pennsylvania v. Nelson =

- Supreme Court of the United States

Argued November 15–16, 1955 Decided April 2, 1956
- Full case name: The State of Pennsylvania, Appellant v. Steve Nelson, Respondent
- Citations: 350 U.S. 497 (more) 76 S. Ct. 477; 100 L. Ed. 640; 1956 U.S. LEXIS 1730

Case history
- Prior: Cert. to the Supreme Court of Pennsylvania, Western District

Holding
- The Pennsylvania law is unenforceable because it was preempted by the federal act.

Court membership
- Chief Justice Earl Warren Associate Justices Hugo Black · Stanley F. Reed; Felix Frankfurter · William O. Douglas; Harold H. Burton · Tom C. Clark; Sherman Minton · John M. Harlan II

Case opinions
- Majority: Warren, joined by Black, Frankfurter, Douglas, Clark, Harlan
- Dissent: Reed, joined by Burton, Minton

Laws applied
- U.S. Const. art. 6 clause 2

Pennsylvania v. Nelson, 350 U.S. 497 (1956), was a United States Supreme Court case that established a precedent for the preemption of United States Federal law over State laws. The case was argued November 15–16, 1955 and the decision was handed down April 2, 1956. The State of Pennsylvania tried to convict a man of sedition under a state law, but a Federal law existed on the same subject. The Court ruled that the Federal law, the Smith Act, overruled the state law, the Pennsylvania Sedition Act, even though the state law was created before the federal law. Nelson, who was convicted under the state law, was therefore mistried.

== Background ==
The Congressional act’s real name was the Alien Registration Act of 1940, but was referred to as the Smith Act because the anti-sedition section – the one Nelson claimed he should have been tried under – was authored by Rep. Howard W. Smith of Virginia. The section on sedition read:

Whoever knowingly or willfully advocates, abets, advises, or teaches the duty, necessity, desirability, or propriety of overthrowing or destroying the government of the United States or the government of any State, Territory, District or Possession thereof, or the government of any political subdivision therein, by force or violence, or by the assassination of any officer of any such government; or

Whoever, with intent to cause the overthrow or destruction of any such government, prints, publishes, edits, issues, circulates, sells, distributes, or publicly displays any written or printed matter advocating, advising, or teaching the duty, necessity, desirability, or propriety of [p512] overthrowing or destroying any government in the United States by force or violence, or attempts to do so; or Whoever organizes or helps or attempts to organize any society, group, or assembly of persons who teach, advocate, or encourage the overthrow or destruction of any such government by force or violence; or becomes or is a member of, or affiliates with, any such society, group, or assembly of persons, knowing the purposes thereof --

Shall be fined not more than $10,000 or imprisoned not more than ten years, or both, and shall be ineligible for employment by the United States or any department or agency thereof, for the five years next following his conviction.

The State of Pennsylvania tried and convicted Steve Nelson, an acknowledged member of the Communist Party, under the Pennsylvania Sedition Act, sentencing him to twenty years in prison and a $10,000 fine as well as $13,000 for prosecution costs. The Smith Act was written after the Pennsylvania Sedition Act, but both were created during the Cold War, during the age of Joseph McCarthy and his House Unamerican Activities Committee; this was the time of the "Second Red Scare", when McCarthy investigated many people accused of communist activities.

Other questions on the constitutionality of the Smith Act have been raised in United States Supreme Court, during cases like U.S. v Brandt and Yates v. United States. Even though the act was amended in 1948, it was declared partially unconstitutional in the Yates decision. It has not been repealed.

The Case was argued in front of the Warren Court whose members were: Earl Warren; Hugo Black; Stanley Reed; Felix Frankfurter; William O. Douglas; Harold Burton; Tom C. Clark; Sherman Minton; and John Marshall Harlan II.

The Constitution of the United States establishes the U.S. Constitution, Federal Statutes, and U.S. Treaties as "the supreme law of the land". This power, found in Article VI, Clause 2 is known as the Supremacy Clause. The text reads:

This Constitution, and the Laws of the United States which shall be made in pursuance thereof; and all treaties made, or which shall be made, under the authority of the United States, shall be the supreme law of the land; and the judges in every state shall be bound thereby, anything in the constitution or laws of any state to the contrary notwithstanding.

This means that when federal and state authorities come into conflict, the federal law prevails. This is known as preemption: "a situation where a legitimate exercise of national authority supersedes any conflicting action by a state government." The Court had to decide whether or not the Pennsylvania law could work concurrently with the Smith Act of the Federal Government.

== Opinion of the Court ==
Petitioner Steve Nelson was convicted under the Pennsylvania Sedition Act, but claimed that the national statute, the Smith Act, preempted his conviction, and the court ruled 6-3 in his favor. The Smith Act of 1940 criminalized sedition against the United States and since the Pennsylvania Sedition Act did essentially the same thing, Chief Justice Earl Warren wrote in the opinion of the court that federal law is preeminent, giving three conditions for Federal preemption:

1. The scheme of federal regulation is "so pervasive as to make reasonable the inference that congress left no room for the states to supplement it";
2. The national interest is so dominant on a subject that the federal system must "be assumed to preclude enforcement of state laws on the same subject";
3. There is a danger of conflict between state and federal enforcement efforts.

The presence of these three conditions meant that congress had chosen to "occupy the field" and thus the states could not regulate within it.

The U.S. Supreme Court decided that, because of this preemptive power, the Smith Act trumped the Pennsylvania statute and therefore the Pennsylvania Sedition Act was unenforceable.

Chief Justice Earl Warren wrote the opinion of the court. The first thing that he stipulates is that, "... the decision in this case does not affect the right of States to enforce their sedition laws at times when the Federal Government has not occupied the field and is not protecting the entire country from seditious conduct. ... Nor does it limit the jurisdiction of the States where the Constitution and Congress have specifically given them concurrent jurisdiction ... Neither does it limit the right of the State to protect itself at any time against sabotage or attempted violence of all kinds. Nor does it prevent the State from prosecuting where the same act constitutes both a federal offense and a state offense under the police power, as was done in Fox v. Ohio."

Warren lays out the state’s power here. In summary: When the federal government has not regulated, the states can act; When the states are granted jurisdiction by congress, the states can act; and finally a state can also act in its defense. Warren enumerates the powers of the Federal Government next with the aforementioned three-part test. The test was derived from Hines v. Davidowitz, 312 U.S. 52, 67. And Rice v. Santa Fe Elevator Corp., 331 U.S. 218.

The first caveat, whether "the scheme of federal regulation [is] so pervasive as to make reasonable the inference that Congress left no room for the States to supplement it", is answered by Warren by noting that Congress, besides the Smith act, had issued The Internal Security Act of 1950. Warren said, " ... the conclusion is inescapable that Congress has intended to occupy the field of sedition."

The Second caveat states that Federal Statutes must "touch a field in which the federal interest is so dominant that the federal system [must] be assumed to preclude enforcement of state laws on the same subject." This means that the national interest is so great that it is necessary to have uniform legislation on the subject. Warren emphasizes that Congress made these acts to provide for the common defense, to preserve the sovereignty of the United States as an independent nation, and to guarantee to each State a republican form of government, and that these concerns are in no way a local concern. Thus there is need for uniform, national legislation.

Warren finally addressed the third caveat, that there be no conflict between state and national laws. He points out that Franklin D. Roosevelt had revealed this discrepancy in the Pennsylvania law earlier :

Unlike the Smith Act, which can be administered only by federal officers acting in their official capacities, indictment for sedition under the Pennsylvania statute can be initiated upon an information made by a private individual. The opportunity thus present for the indulgence of personal spite and hatred or for furthering some selfish advantage or ambition need only be mentioned to be appreciated. Defense of the Nation by law, no less than by arms, should be a public, and not a private, undertaking. It is important that punitive sanctions for sedition against the United States be such as have been promulgated by the central governmental authority and administered under the supervision and review of that authority's judiciary. If that be done, sedition will be detected and punished no less, wherever it may be found, and the right of the individual to speak freely and without fear, even in criticism of the government, will, at the same time, be protected.

=== Dissent ===
Justice Stanley Reed wrote the dissenting opinion. Justices Harold Burton and Sherman Minton signed onto the opinion. "The 'occupation of the field' argument has been developed by this Court for the Commerce Clause and legislation thereunder to prevent partitioning of this country by locally erected trade barriers", wrote Reed, "In those cases, this Court has ruled that state legislation is superseded when it conflicts with the comprehensive regulatory scheme and purpose of a federal plan. …" Reed says that in order for federal law to nullify a state law, "the conflict should be clear and direct before this Court reads a congressional intent to void state legislation into the federal sedition acts." Reed argues that Congress has not occupied the field with the Smith Act, and that it doesn’t need to, and by doing so is undermining state power. Reed finishes with an emphatic declaration:

The Smith Act appears in Title 18 of the United States Code, which Title codifies the federal criminal laws. Section 3231 of that Title provides:

Nothing in this title shall be held to take away or impair the jurisdiction of the courts of the several States under the laws thereof.

That declaration springs from the federal character of our Nation. It recognizes the fact that maintenance of order and fairness rests primarily with the States. … This Court has interpreted the section to mean that States may provide concurrent legislation in the absence of explicit congressional intent to the contrary. Sexton v. California, 189 U.S. 319, 324-325. The majority's position in this case cannot be reconciled with that clear authorization of Congress.

The law stands against any advocacy of violence to change established governments. Freedom of speech allows full play to the processes of reason. The state and national legislative bodies have legislated within constitutional limits so as to allow the widest participation by the law enforcement officers of the respective governments. The individual States were not told that they are powerless to punish local acts of sedition, nominally directed against the United States. Courts should not interfere. We would reverse the judgment of the Supreme Court of Pennsylvania.
