= Holmby Productions, Inc. v. Vaughn =

1955 Kansas Supreme Court case

- Court: Supreme Court of Kansas
- Full case name: Holmby Productions, Incorporated, and United Artists Corporation, Appellees, v. Mrs. Frances Vaughn, Mrs. J.R. Stowers and Mrs. Bertha Hall, constituting The Kansas State Board of Review; Harold R. Fatzer, Attorney General of the State of Kansas; and Donald E. Martin, County Attorney of Wyandotte County, Kansas, Appellants.
- Decided: April 9, 1955
- Citations: Holmby Productions inc v. Vaughn; 282 P.2d 412

Case history
- Appealed from: District court of Wyandotte county
- Appealed to: United States Supreme Court
- Subsequent actions: Judgment reversed, 350 U.S. 870

Holding
- The original trial court decision, finding that the censorship statute is unconstitutional, is overturned; under the statute, a court can only overturn the board judgment if it is clearly wrong; the denial of the permit is upheld

Court membership
- Chief judge: William West Harvey

Case opinions
- Decision by: Clair E. Robb

Laws applied
- G.S. 1949, 51-102, 51-103, 51-107

Holmby Productions, Inc. v. Vaughn, 177 Kan. 728 (1955), 282 P.2d 412, is a Kansas Supreme Court case in which the Kansas State Board of Review, the state censorship board, and the attorney defendants appealed the decision of the District Court of Wyandotte County. It was found that the law that allowed the board to deny a request for a permit allowing United Artists to show the motion picture The Moon is Blue in Kansas theaters was unconstitutional, and an injunction was issued prohibiting the defendants from stopping the exhibition of the film in Kansas.

== Background ==
Holmby productions, the owner of the film The Moon is Blue, and its exclusive worldwide distributor, United Artists Corporation, pursuant to a Kansas statute (G.S. 1949, 51-103), applied for a license from the Kansas State Board of Review to distribute the film in Kansas. On June 17, 1953, the board disapproved the film:

Sex theme throughout, too frank bedroom dialogue: many sexy words; both dialogue and action have sex as their theme.

== Appeal ==
The owner and distributor decided to appeal and filed suit in the District Court of Wyandotte County. After a trial, the court found the statute unconstitutional, saying that

...motion pictures are protected by the first and fourteenth amendments to the constitution of the United States; the statute providing for censorship is invalid, as repugnant thereto; the board's statements and reasons for its construction of the words of the statute gave each of the words a meaning so broad and vague as to render the statute unconstitutional;

a permanent injunction was entered against the defendants, prohibiting them from stopping the exhibition of the film.

== Re-examination ==
After the injunction was granted, on September 11, 1953, the board re-examined the film, and again disapproved the film, saying

... the Board has found that film to be obscene, indecent and immoral, and such as tend to debase or corrupt morals,

Being unable to stop exhibition of the film it had rejected twice, the Board appealed.

== Supreme Court of Kansas ==
The Supreme Court of Kansas overturned the district court and found that the board being an executive branch agency, neither the District Court nor it could substitute its own opinion of the film, and there was no abuse of discretion on the part of the board. The court said,

The only question before us, then, is whether the statutes under consideration are unconstitutional because they are an abridgment or contravention of the first and fourteenth amendments to the constitution of the United States, or because they are couched in language so vague and indefinite as to offend due process. We will first determine whether the words, "obscene, indecent, or immoral, or such as tend to debase or corrupt morals," are vague and indefinite terms so as to offend due process. We are of the opinion these words have an accepted, definite, and clear meaning.

=== Meaning of words and prior restraint ===
The court went on to use ordinary dictionary entries to show the words have clearly defined meanings. The court then looked at the plaintiff's argument that the board represented censorship or prior restraint. Examining a number of U.S. Supreme Court cases, the court looked first at Near v. Minnesota, 283 U.S. 697, 75 L.ed. 1357, 51 S.Ct. 625, (prior restraint of newspapers is unconstitutional), in which Justice Hughes said,

"... the protection even as to previous restraint is not absolutely unlimited.... No one would question but that a government might prevent actual obstruction to its recruiting service or the publication of the sailing dates of transports or the number and location of troops. On similar grounds, the primary requirements of decency may be enforced against obscene publications." (Our italics.)

The court also looked at Chaplinsky v. New Hampshire, 315 U.S. 568, 86 L.ed. 1031, 62 S.Ct. 766, ("fighting words" are not protected by the First Amendment) where Justice Murphy stated,

"Allowing the broadest scope to the language and purpose of the Fourteenth Amendment, it is well understood that the right of free speech is not absolute at all times and under all circumstances. There are certain well-defined and narrowly limited classes of speech, the prevention and punishment of which have never been thought to raise any Constitutional problem. These include the lewd and obscene, the profane, the libelous, and the insulting or `fighting' words — those which by their very utterance inflict injury or tend to incite an immediate breach of the peace."

The court then went on to look at a US Supreme Court case both sides had referenced, Joseph Burstyn, Inc. v. Wilson, 343 U.S. 495, 96 L.ed. 1098; 72 S.Ct. 777 (New York state motion picture licensing system similar to the one in Kansas, which prohibited "sacrilegious" films was unconstitutional) in which the U.S. Supreme Court said,

... it is not necessary for us to decide, for example, whether a state may censor motion pictures under a clearly drawn statute designed and applied to prevent the showing of obscene films.

=== Findings ===
Since the court in Burstyn had excepted obscenity from First Amendment protection, the State Board of Review classifying the film as obscene meant the Board was within its power to ban the film. The court overturned the decision of the trial court and instructed it to reinstate the decision of the Board.

== US Supreme Court ==
Holmby Productions, Inc. v. Vaughn
- Supreme Court of the United States

Decided October 22, 1955
- Full case name: Holmby Productions, Inc. v. Vaughn
- Citations: 350 U.S. 870 (more)

Holding
- Judgement reversed.

Court membership
- Chief Justice Earl Warren Associate Justices Hugo Black · Stanley F. Reed; Felix Frankfurter · William O. Douglas; Harold H. Burton · Tom C. Clark; Sherman Minton · John M. Harlan II

Case opinion
- Per curiam

United Artists, the distributor, appealed to the US Supreme Court. The decision per curiam (by the entire court), Holmby Productions, Inc. v. Vaughn, 350 U.S. 870, literally consisted entirely of

Judgment reversed.

The use of a "shotgun approach" to obscenity was disavowed and overturned.

== Aftermath ==
As a result, the distributor was now able to exhibit the film in Kansas. The decision of the US Supreme Court reversing the case was recognized by the highest courts of other states that Kansas's Censorship Statute was unconstitutional. The US Supreme Court, in Interstate Circuit, Inc. v. Dallas, 390 U.S. 676 (1968), recognized that its decision in Holmby struck down the Kansas Film Censorship statute as unconstitutional.

Ten years later, in Freedman v. Maryland, 380 U.S. 51 (1965), the US Supreme Court ruled that censorship boards had no power to ban a film and that laws allowing bans were unconstitutional. A board could approve a film or had to sue to stop a film's exhibition.

== See also ==
- List of United States Supreme Court cases, volume 350
