= List of United States Supreme Court cases, volume 354 =

This is a list of all the United States Supreme Court cases from volume 354 of the United States Reports:

Case name	Citation	Date decided
Reid v. Covert	354 U.S. 1	June 10, 1957
Smith v. Sperling	354 U.S. 91	June 10, 1957
Swanson v. Traer	354 U.S. 114	June 10, 1957
Curcio v. United States	354 U.S. 118	June 10, 1957
British Transport Comm'n v. United States	354 U.S. 129	June 10, 1957
Lake Tankers Corp. v. Henn	354 U.S. 147	June 10, 1957
Chessman v. Teets	354 U.S. 156	June 10, 1957
Watkins v. United States	354 U.S. 178	June 17, 1957
Sweezy v. New Hampshire	354 U.S. 234	June 17, 1957
United States v. Korpan	354 U.S. 271	June 17, 1957
Theard v. United States	354 U.S. 278	June 17, 1957
Teamsters v. Vogt, Inc.	354 U.S. 284	June 17, 1957
Yates v. United States	354 U.S. 298	June 17, 1957
United States v. Calamaro	354 U.S. 351	June 17, 1957
Service v. Dulles	354 U.S. 363	June 17, 1957
W. Point Wholesale Grocery Company v. City of Opelika	354 U.S. 390	June 17, 1957
Blackburn v. Alabama	354 U.S. 393	June 17, 1957
Carroll v. United States (1957)	354 U.S. 394	June 24, 1957
Vanderbilt v. Vanderbilt	354 U.S. 416	June 24, 1957
Kingsley Books, Inc. v. Brown	354 U.S. 436	June 24, 1957
Mallory v. United States	354 U.S. 449	June 24, 1957
Morey v. Doud	354 U.S. 457	June 24, 1957
Roth v. United States	354 U.S. 476	June 24, 1957
United States v. Louisiana (1957)	354 U.S. 515	June 24, 1957
McBride v. Toledo Terminal R. Company	354 U.S. 517	June 24, 1957
Farley v. United States	354 U.S. 521	June 24, 1957
Wilson v. Girard	354 U.S. 524	July 11, 1957
