= Susan Oliver =

American actress, author and aviator (1932–1990)

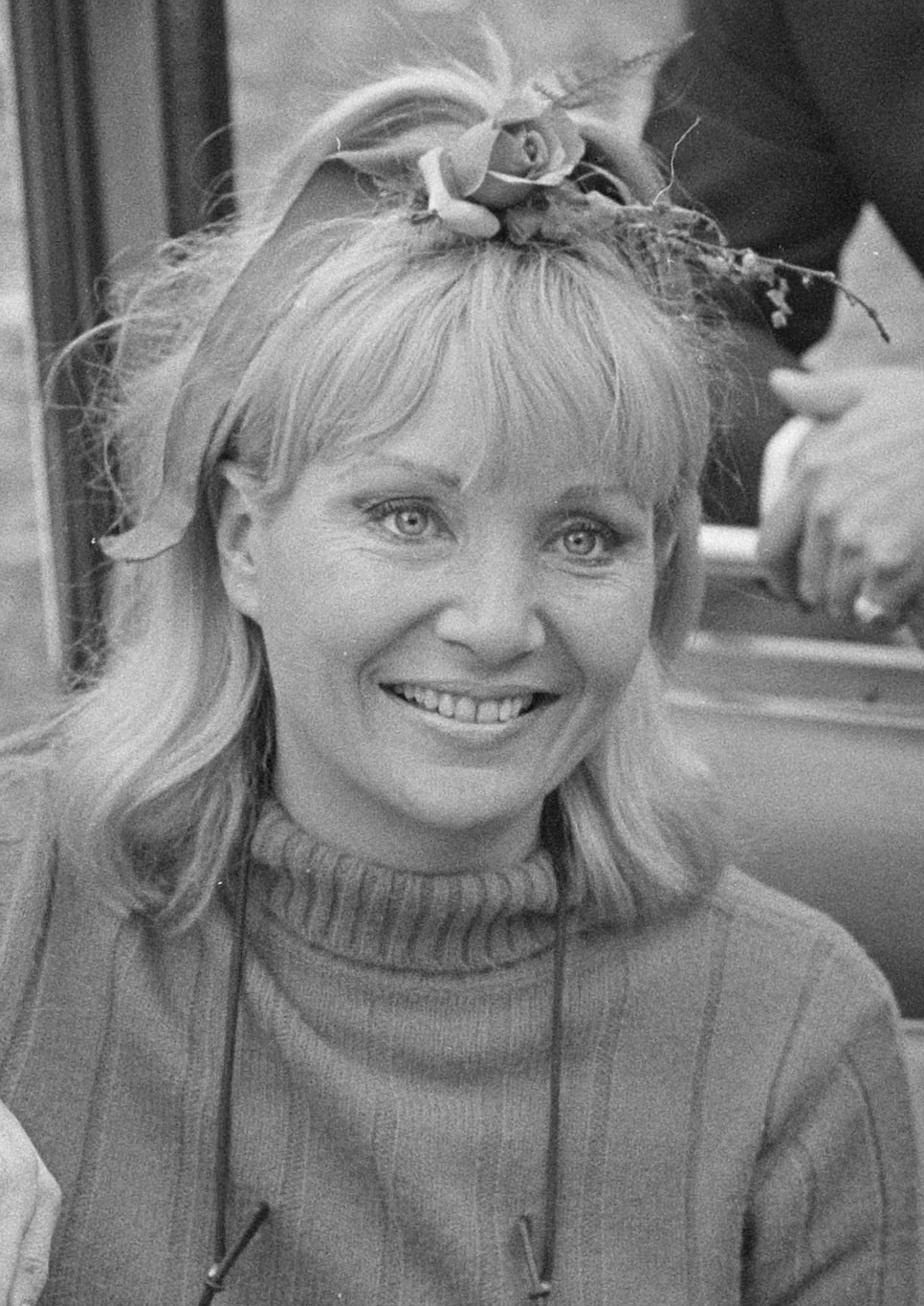
- Oliver in 1971
- Born: Charlotte Gercke; February 13, 1932; New York City, U.S.
- Died: May 10, 1990 (aged 58); Los Angeles, California, U.S.
- Education: Swarthmore College; Neighborhood Playhouse School of the Theatre
- Occupations: Actress; director; aviator; author
- Years active: 1955–1988

Susan Oliver (born Charlotte Gercke; February 13, 1932 – May 10, 1990) was an American actress, television director, aviator, and author.

== Career ==
=== Early years ===
Oliver did numerous television shows in 1957, and appeared on stage. She began the year with an ingénue part, as the daughter of an 18th-century Manhattan family, in her first Broadway play, Small War on Murray Hill, a Robert E. Sherwood comedy. That same year, Oliver replaced Mary Ure as the female lead in the Broadway production of John Osborne's play Look Back in Anger.

The play's short run was immediately followed by larger roles in live television plays on Kaiser Aluminum Hour, The United States Steel Hour, and Matinee Theater. Oliver then went to Hollywood, where she appeared in the November 14, 1957, episode of Climax!, one of the few live drama series based on the West Coast, as well as in a number of filmed shows, including one of the first episodes of NBC's Wagon Train, Father Knows Best, The Americans, and Johnny Staccato.

In July 1957, Oliver was chosen for the title role in her first motion picture, The Green-Eyed Blonde, a low-budget independent melodrama scripted by Dalton Trumbo (under a pseudonym), and released by Warner Bros. in December on the bottom half of a double bill.

In mid-1958, Oliver began rehearsals for a co-starring role in Patate, her second Broadway play. Its seven-performance run was even shorter than that of Small War on Murray Hill, but won Oliver a Theatre World Award for "Outstanding Breakout Performance"; it was her last Broadway appearance.

=== Television and films ===
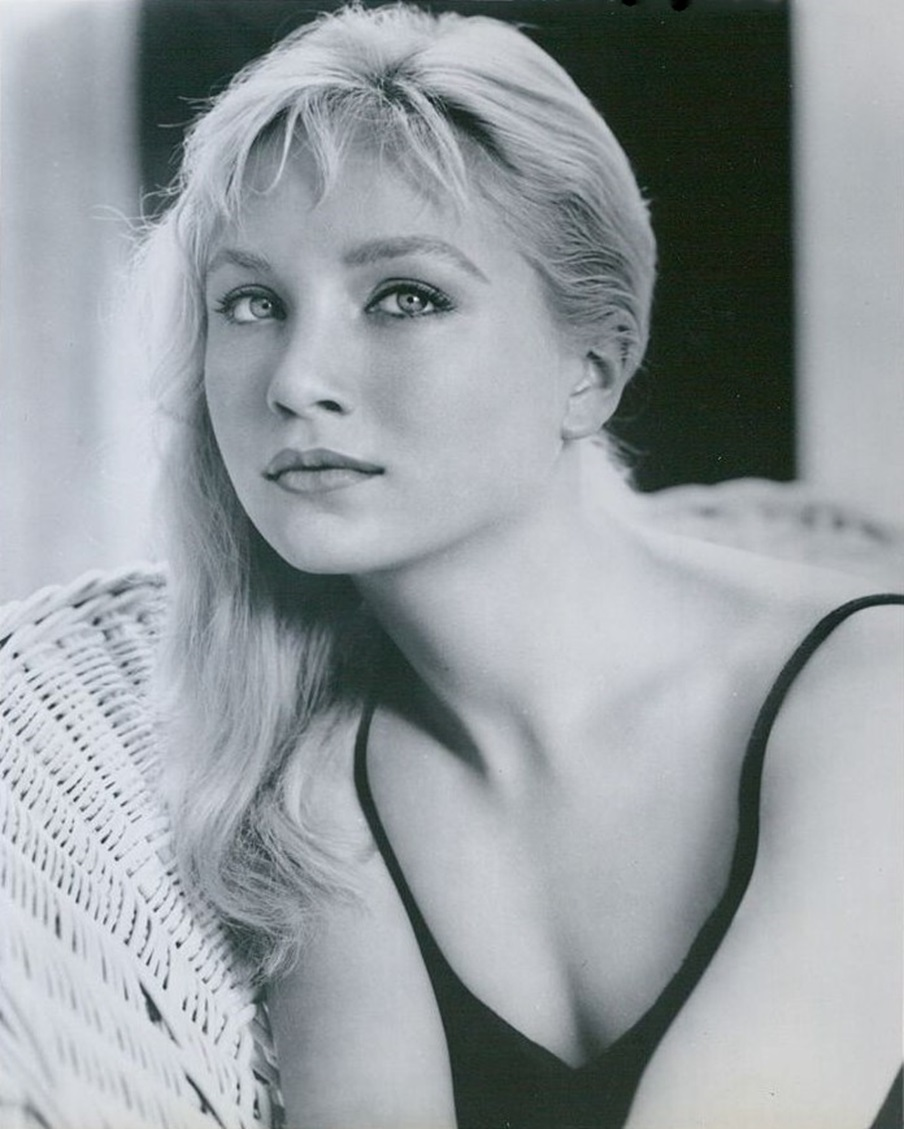
Oliver in 1959

On April 6, 1960, the 28-year-old Oliver played a spoiled young runaway, Maggie Hamilton, who gets soundly spanked by scout Flint McCullough (Robert Horton), in "The Maggie Hamilton Story" on NBC's Wagon Train. Oliver appeared in the Metro-Goldwyn-Mayer movie, “Butterfield 8”, as Norma; the film was released on November 2, 1960. On November 9, 1960, she was cast as the lead guest star in "The Cathy Eckhart Story" on Wagon Train, with husband-and-wife actors John Larch and Vivi Janiss as Ben and Sarah Harness.

Oliver was cast in the 1960 episode of The Deputy as the long-lost daughter of star Henry Fonda's late girl friend, and appeared in Dick Powell's Zane Grey Theatre episode "Knife of Hate" as Susan Pittman. In 1961, Oliver played the part of Laurie Evans in the episode "Incident of His Brother's Keeper" on CBS's Rawhide, and in 1963, she played Judy Hall in the episode "Incident at Spider Rock", Also in 1962, Oliver appeared as Jeanie in the television series Laramie in the episode "Shadows in the Dust".

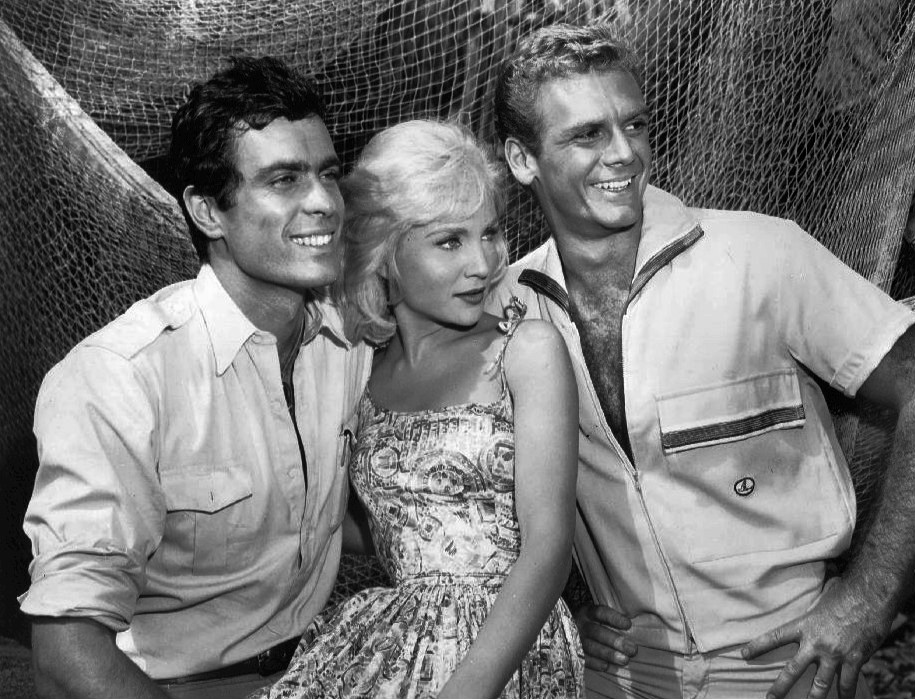
With Gardner McKay and Guy Stockwell in Adventures in Paradise (1961)

Oliver was cast in episodes of Adventures in Paradise; Twilight Zone; The Alfred Hitchcock Hour; Route 66; Dr. Kildare; The Naked City; The Barbara Stanwyck Show; Burke's Law; The Fugitive; Gomer Pyle, U.S.M.C.; I Spy; The Virginian; The Name of the Game; Longstreet; and Mannix. She made one appearance on The Andy Griffith Show and ABC's family Western series, The Travels of Jaimie McPheeters. She also made two appearances in Quinn Martin's The Invaders (episodes: "Inquisition" and "The Ivy Curtain") on ABC.

Her most challenging role during this time was as the ambitious wife of doomed country music legend Hank Williams (George Hamilton) in Your Cheatin' Heart (1964). The same year, she also starred opposite Jerry Lewis in The Disorderly Orderly, and appeared in The Man from U.N.C.L.E. (1965) and The Love-Ins (1967) with Richard Todd.

Oliver appeared in television films, including Carter's Army. She had a continuing role as Ann Howard on ABC's primetime serial Peyton Place in 1966.

Oliver as Vina transformed into an Orion slave girl in the Star Trek episodes "The Cage" and "The Menagerie"

Oliver played the female lead guest character Vina in "The Cage" (1964), which was the first pilot of Gene Roddenberry's new show, Star Trek. Two years later, Oliver's performance was reused in the first season, two-part episode "The Menagerie" (1966). Because the special optical effects used by the series were taking longer to complete than anticipated (which made a missed air date a real possibility), that pilot story was re-framed using newly filmed "current" footage and a time difference to explain the significant format and cast evolution since Oliver's scenes were filmed. In particular, Jeffrey Hunter played "Captain Christopher Pike" in the pilot episode, but was replaced by William Shatner as "Captain James T. Kirk" of the Starship Enterprise when the series was green-lit by NBC in 1966. For the fantasy sequence in the pilot, in which her character appeared as an "Orion slave girl", Oliver was covered in green makeup all over her body, and a dark brunette wig. A still of her with green skin is frequently seen in the end credits of the television series, and it has since become a well-known image among Star Trek enthusiasts. Hence, the 2014 documentary about Susan Oliver's life was titled The Green Girl.

In 1970, she appeared as Carole Carson/Alice Barnes on the television Western The Men From Shiloh (rebranded name for The Virginian) in the episode titled "Hannah".

From 1975 to 1976, Oliver was a regular cast member of the television soap opera Days of Our Lives. In 1976, she received her only Emmy Award nomination (for "Outstanding Performance by a Supporting Actress") for playing pioneer aviator, Neta Snook, in the three-hour-long, made-for-TV movie Amelia Earhart, broadcast on October 15, 1976, on NBC-TV.

In addition to her scores of television appearances, Oliver also had roles in several theatrical features, including The Gene Krupa Story (1959), BUtterfield 8 (1960) and The Caretakers (1963).

=== Directing and later years ===
By the late 1970s with acting opportunities coming less frequently, Oliver turned to directing. She was one of the original 19 women admitted to the American Film Institute's Directing Workshop for Women (DWW), and she left a "good chunk of funding for the DWW". In 1977, she wrote and directed Cowboysan, her AFI DWW short film that presents the fantasy scenario of a Japanese actor and actress playing leads in an American Western. Oliver directed two television episodes, the premiere episode "Hey, Look Me Over" of the 11th season of M*A*S*H and the season-five episode "Fat Chance" of one of M*A*S*H's sequel series, Trapper John, M.D.

In Oliver's last fully active years, she also appeared in the February 21, 1985 episode of Magnum, P.I., two episodes of Murder, She Wrote (March 31 and December 1), the February 12, 1987 episode of Simon & Simon, and the January 10, 1988 episode of the NBC domestic drama Our House. She made her last onscreen appearance in the November 6, 1988 episode of the syndicated horror anthology Freddy's Nightmares. During her career in Hollywood, Oliver amassed well over 100 credits.

== Aviator and author ==
Oliver experienced an event in February 1959 that underscored her later aviation accomplishments. She was a passenger aboard Pan Am Flight 115, a Boeing 707 on a transatlantic flight from Paris to New York City when it dropped from 35,000 to 6,000 feet (10,700 to 1,800 m). It was February 3, 1959, the same day Buddy Holly died in an airplane crash. These events caused her to avoid flying for the next year, even turning down job offers, with the exception of auditioning for BUtterfield 8, if they were of such short notice that she could only travel by air. She eventually underwent hypnosis to overcome her fear of flying.

In July 1964, local Los Angeles area news anchor Hal Fishman introduced her to personal flying when he took her on an evening flight over Los Angeles in a Cessna 172. The experience motivated her to return the next day to the Santa Monica Airport to begin training for a private pilot certificate. In 1966, while preparing for her own transatlantic flight, she was a passenger in a Piper J-3 Cub when the pilot ran into wires while "show-boating"; the airplane flipped and crashed. She and the pilot escaped injury.

In 1967, piloting her own Aero Commander 200, which was fitted with an extra fuel tank, she became the fourth woman to fly a single-engined aircraft solo across the Atlantic Ocean and the second to do it from New York City. Oliver's route included stops in Goose Bay, Canada, Narsarsuaq in Greenland, Keflavik in Iceland, and Prestwick in Scotland, before landing in Copenhagen, Denmark. Although she was attempting to fly to Moscow, her odyssey ended in Denmark after the government of the Soviet Union denied her permission to enter its air space. She wrote about her aviation exploits and philosophy of life in an autobiography published in 1983 titled Odyssey: A Daring Transatlantic Journey.

In 1968, she was contacted by Learjet to see if she was interested in obtaining a type rating on one of their jet planes with the intent to set record flights for them. She earned the rating and even flew some charters (having by that time acquired a commercial pilot certificate in single- and multiengined land airplanes), but did not fly any record flights in their jets.

In 1970, Oliver co-piloted a Piper Comanche to victory in the 2760-mile transcontinental race known as the "Powder Puff Derby", which resulted in her being named Pilot of the Year by the Association of Executive Pilots. The pilot was Margaret Mead (not the famous anthropologist), an experienced pilot who had flown in several derbies with different co-pilots. In 1971, Oliver was inducted as a member of the Federal Aviation Administration's Women Advisory Committee on Aviation.

In 1972, her training for a glider rating was chronicled for an episode of the television series The American Sportsman, and the segment aired in March 1973.

According to the FAA Registry, the glider rating was issued to Oliver on July 21, 1972. It was her last rating. The registry shows her to have earned commercial pilot ratings for airplane single-engined land, airplane multi-engined land, instrument airplane, and private privileges for glider. Her last aviation medical examination was in May 1976, so she could not legally pilot any aircraft except gliders after May 1978, marking the end of her piloting of powered aircraft.

== Death ==
Oliver was diagnosed with colorectal cancer that later metastasized to her lungs, and she died on May 10, 1990 (aged 58), at the Motion Picture and Television Hospital in Woodland Hills, California.

== Selected filmography ==
Year	Title	Role	Notes
1955	Goodyear Playhouse		Episode: "The Prizewinner"
1956	Studio One	Flora	Episode: "A Day Before Battle"
1956	Camera Three	Dewey Dell	Episode: "As I Lay Dying"
1957	The Green-Eyed Blonde	Phyllis ("Greeneyes")	
1957	The Kaiser Aluminum Hour	Kay	Episode: "So Short a Season"
1957	The United States Steel Hour	Maria	Episode: "The Bottle Imp"
1957	Crossroads	Connie Willis	Episode: "9:30 Action"
1957	Matinee Theater		Episode: "End of the Rope"
1957	Climax!	Pat Farley	Episode: "Two Tests for Tuesday"
1957	Studio 57		Episode: "Seventh Brother, Seventh Son"
1957	Wagon Train	Judy Rossiter	Episode: "The Emily Rossiter Story"
1957	Playhouse 90	Louise Grant	Episode: "The Thundering Wave"
1958	Father Knows Best	Cousin Milly	Episode: "Country Cousin"
1958	Kraft Television Theatre	Pamela	Episode: "The Woman at High Hollow"
1958	Matinee Theater		Episode: "Button, Button"
1958	Suspicion	Rosemary Russell	Episode: "The Woman Turned to Salt"
1959	Playhouse 90	Ellie	Episode: "A Trip to Paradise"
1959	The David Niven Show	Ilsa	Episode: "The Last Room"
1959	Armstrong Circle Theatre		Episode: "The Monkey Ride"
1959	Trackdown	Rebecca Ford	Episode: "Blind Alley"
1959	The Millionaire	Cathy Burnell	Episode: "Millionaire Phillip Burnell"
1959	Johnny Staccato	Barbara Ames	Episode: "Murder in Hi-Fi"
1959	The Lineup	Laurie Hayden	Episode: "Run to the City"
1959	Alcoa Theatre	Bernice Davis	Episode: "The Long House on Avenue A"
1959	The Gene Krupa Story	Dorissa Dinell	
1960	BUtterfield 8	Norma	
1960	Playhouse 90	Valerie Ferguson	Episode: "A Dream of Treason"
1960	The DuPont Show with June Allyson	Judy	Episode: "The Blue Goose"
1960	Wanted Dead or Alive	Bess	Episode: "The Pariah"
1960	Wrangler	Helen McQueen	Episode: "Incident at the Bar M"
1960	The Deputy	Julie Desmond	Episode: "The Deadly Breed"
1960	The Untouchables	Roxie Plumber	Episode: "The Organization"
1960	Bonanza	Leta Malvet	Episode: "The Outcast"
1960	Wagon Train	Maggie Hamilton	Episode: "The Maggie Hamilton Story"
1960	Wagon Train	Cathy Eckhart	Episode: "The Cathy Eckhart Story"
1960	The Twilight Zone	Teenya	Episode: "People Are Alike All Over"
1960	Dick Powell's Zane Grey Theatre	Susan Pittman	Episode: "Knife of Hate"
1960	The Barbara Stanwyck Show	Tracy Lane	Episode: "No One"
1961	Naked City	as Jessica	Episode: "A Memory of Crying"
1961	The Aquanauts	Laura West	Episode: "Stormy Weather"
1961	Rawhide	Laurie Evans	S3:E21, "Incident of His Brother's Keeper"
1961	The Adventures of Ozzie and Harriet	Lori	Episode: "Rick, the Milkman"
1961	Route 66	Joan Maslow	Episode: "Welcome to Amity"
1961	Dick Powell's Zane Grey Theatre	Hannah Smith	Episode: "Image of a Drawn Sword"
1961	Thriller	Edith Landers	Episode: "Choose a Victim"
1962	Route 66	Claire/Chris	Episode: "Between Hello and Goodbye"
1962	Laramie	Jean Lavelle	Episode: "Shadows in the Dust"
1962	Cain's Hundred	Kitty	Episode: "The Cost of Living"
1962	The Alfred Hitchcock Hour	Annabel Delaney	Season 1 Episode 7: "Annabel"
1963	Rawhide	Judy Hall	Episode: "Incident at Spider Rock"
1963	Wagon Train	Lily	Episode: "The Lily Legend Story"
1963	77 Sunset Strip	Kristine Seaver	Episode: "Your Fortune for a Penny"
1963	The Caretakers	Nurse Cathy Clark	
1963	The Fugitive	Karen	Episode: "Never Wave Goodbye" (Parts 1 & 2)
1963	Dr. Kildare	Carol Logan	Episode: "The Eleventh Commandment"
1963	Route 66	Willow	Episode: "Fifty Miles from Home"
1964	Looking For Love	Jan McNair	
1964	Guns of Diablo	Maria Macklin	
1964	Your Cheatin' Heart	Audrey Williams	Biography of country music legend Hank Williams
1964	The Disorderly Orderly	Susan Andrews	
1964	Destry	Rebecca Fairhaven	Episode: "One Hundred Bibles"
1964	The Andy Griffith Show	Prisoner	Episode: "Prisoner of Love" Season 4 Episode 18
1964	The Defenders	Anna Leverton	Episode: "The Hidden Fury""
1964	Star Trek	Vina	Pilot Episode: "The Cage" Episode: "The Menagerie" (Parts 1 & 2) S1: E11 & E12 respectively (1966) (re-used footage from the pilot)
1965	Seaway	Sue Murray	Episode: "The Sparrows"
1965	Ben Casey	Tina Khaskova	Episode: "Pas De Deux"
1965	The Rogues	Melinda	Episode: "Money is for Burning"
1965	The Man from U.N.C.L.E.	Ursula Alice Baldwin	Episode: "The Bow-Wow Affair"
1965	The Virginian	Martha Perry	Episode: "A Little Learning"
1966	A Man Called Shenandoah	Virginia Harvey	Episode: "Rope's End"
1966	I Spy	Jean	Episode: "One Thousand Fine"
1966	Gomer Pyle, U.S.M.C.	Julie Myers	Episode: "A Date with Miss Camp Henderson"
1966	My Three Sons	Jerry Harper	Episode: "The Awkward Age"
1966	Peyton Place	Ann Howard	48 episodes
1966	Star Trek: The Original Series	Vina	S1:E11-E12, "The Menagerie"
1967	Tarzan	Peggy Dean	Episode S1E18: "The Day the Earth Trembled"
1967	T.H.E. Cat	Lori Neil	Episode: "Twenty One And Out"
1967	The Love-Ins	Patricia Cross	
1967	The Wild Wild West	Triste	Episode: "The Night Dr. Loveless Died"
1967	The Invaders	Stacy Cahill	Episode: "The Ivy Curtain"
1968	A Man Called Gannon	Matty	
1968	The Invaders	Joan Seeley	Episode: "Inquisition"
1968	The Virginian	Anne Crowder	Episode: "The Storm Gate"
1969	Mannix	Linda Jordan	S2-Episode 21: "The Odds Against Donald Jordan"
1969	The Big Valley	Kate Wilson	Episode: "Alias Nellie Handley"
1969	Change of Mind	Margaret Rowe	
1969	The Monitors	Barbara Cole	
1970	Carter's Army	Anna Renvic	ABC Movie of the Week
1971	Company of Killers	Thelma Dwyer	TV movie
1971	Do You Take This Stranger?	Mildred Crandall	TV movie
1971	Dan August	Leona Serling	Episode: "Prognosis: Homicide"
1971	Sarge	Fran	Episode: "An Accident Waiting to Happen"
1971	Alias Smith and Jones	Miss Blanche Graham	Episode: "Journey from San Juan"
1972	Night Gallery	Kelly Bellman	Episode: "The Tune in Dan's Cafe"
1972	The Smith Family	Gloria Cramer	Episode: "Where There's Smoke"
1972	Medical Center	Ruth	Episode: "Vision of Doom"
1972	Gunsmoke	Sarah Elkins	Episode: "Eleven Dollars"
1973	The American Sportsman	Herself	Segment: "Soaring at El Mirage"
1973	Cannon	Jill Thorson	Episode: "Moving Target"
1973	The Magician	Susanna	Episode: "Ovation for Murder"
1973	Circle of Fear	Ellen Pritchard	Episode: "Spare Parts"
1973	Love Story	Virginia Madison	Episode: "The Youngest Lovers"
1974	Ginger in the Morning	Sugar	
1974	Police Story	Rina Prescott	Episode: "World Full of Hurt"
1974	Petrocelli	Eleanor Warren	Episode: "Edge of Evil"
1974	Police Surgeon	Diana Simpson	Episode: "Time Bomb"
1974	Barnaby Jones	Karen Macklin	Episode: "Friends Till Death"
1975	Days of Our Lives	Dr. Laura Horton	90 episodes
1975	The Manhunter	Liz Butler	Episode: "The Death Watch"
1976	Amelia Earhart	Netta Snook "Snookie"	
1977	The Streets of San Francisco	Gracie Boggs	Episode: "Hang Tough"
1977	Nido de Viudas	Isabel	US title: Widow's Nest
1980	Hardly Working	Claire Trent	
1982	Tomorrow's Child	Marilyn Hurst	Television movie
1982	M*A*S*H		Director, 1 episode
1983	Trapper John, M.D.		Director, 1 episode
1982	International Airport	Mary Van Leuven	Television movie
1984	Murder, She Wrote	Nurse Marge Horton	Episode: "Armed Response"
1985	Magnum, P.I.	Laurie Crane	Episode: "Let Me Hear the Music"
1986	Murder, She Wrote	Louise	Episode: "Jessica Behind Bars"
1987	Simon & Simon	Cyd Greenwald	Episode: "Tanner, P.I. for Hire"
1988	Our House	Olga Zelnikova	Episode: "Balance of Power"
1988	Freddy's Nightmares	The Maid / Future Judy Miller	Episode: "Judy Miller, Come on Down" (final appearance)

=== Documentary ===
- The Green Girl (2014), biographical documentary film directed by George Pappy.

== See also ==
- Manumit School
