= The Moon Is Blue (film) =

1953 film by Otto Preminger

- Theatrical release poster
- Directed by: Otto Preminger
- Screenplay by: F. Hugh Herbert
- Based on: The Moon Is Blue by F. Hugh Herbert
- Produced by: Otto Preminger
- Starring: William Holden; David Niven; Maggie McNamara
- Cinematography: Ernest Laszlo
- Edited by: Otto Ludwig
- Music by: Herschel Burke Gilbert
- Production company: Otto Preminger Films (uncredited)
- Distributed by: United Artists
- Release dates: June 22, 1953 (Woods Theatre, Chicago); July 8, 1953 (USA)
- Running time: 99 minutes
- Country: United States
- Language: English
- Budget: $400,000
- Box office: $3.5 million (US and Canada rentals)

The Moon Is Blue is a 1953 American romantic comedy film produced and directed by Otto Preminger and starring William Holden, David Niven, and Maggie McNamara. Written by F. Hugh Herbert and based on his 1951 play of the same title, the film is about a young woman who meets an architect on the observation deck of the Empire State Building and quickly turns his life upside down. Herbert's play had also been a huge success in Germany, and Preminger decided to simultaneously film in English and German, using the same sets but different casts. The German-language film version is Die Jungfrau auf dem Dach.

== Plot ==
A comedy of manners, the film centers on virtuous actress Patty O'Neill, who meets playboy architect Donald Gresham at the top of the Empire State Building and accepts his invitation to join him for drinks and dinner in his apartment. There she meets Donald's upstairs neighbors, his ex-fiancée Cynthia Slater and her father, roguish David Slater.

Both men are determined to seduce the young woman, but they quickly discover that Patty is more interested in engaging in spirited discussions about the pressing moral and sexual issues of the day than in surrendering her virginity to either of them. After resisting their amorous advances throughout the night, Patty leaves. The next day she returns to the Empire State Building, where she finds Donald, who has missed her and worried all night about her. He declares his love for her and proposes marriage to her.

== Cast ==
- William Holden as Donald Gresham
- David Niven as David Slater
- Maggie McNamara as Patty O'Neill
- Tom Tully as Michael O'Neill, Patty's father
- Dawn Addams as Cynthia Slater, David's daughter
- Fortunio Bonanova as Television Performer
- Gregory Ratoff as Taxi Driver

Hardy Krüger and Johanna Matz, the stars of the German version, appear as the young tourist couple waiting to use the coin-operated telescope at the top of the Empire State Building, cameo roles which Holden and McNamara play in the German version.

== Play ==
Otto Preminger had staged the 1951 Broadway production of F. Hugh Herbert's play at Henry Miller's Theatre, with Barbara Bel Geddes, Donald Cook, and Barry Nelson in the lead roles. It had a successful run of 924 performances, from March 8, 1951 (almost the worst year on record for the Broadway stage, according to The Billboard) until May 30, 1953.

A third, West Coast, touring company announced shows at the La Jolla Playhouse from July 1 through July 6, 1952, starring David Niven and Diana Lynn, and continuing on a tour scheduled to include Los Angeles (Biltmore), San Bernardino, San Francisco, and other cities joining the Chicago touring company.

On July 8, 1952, producer/director Otto Preminger opened the West Coast production at the United Nations Theater in San Francisco for a three-month run, with David Niven as David Slater, Diana Lynn as Patty O'Neill, and Scott Brady as Donald Gresham in the lead roles.

== Production ==
Preminger contracted with United Artists to finance and distribute a screen adaptation over which he would have complete control. Preminger cast David Niven over the objection of studio executives, who felt that the actor's career was in decline. He deferred his producer's and director's salaries in exchange for 75% of the film's profits.

Maggie McNamara, who appeared as Patty O'Neill in the Chicago production of the play, and briefly in New York, received her first screen role and the film's last casting.

Herbert's play had been a huge success in Germany, and Preminger decided to film multiple-language versions simultaneously in English and German (Die Jungfrau auf dem Dach), using the same sets but different casts. The director estimated this method would increase the filming schedule by only eight to ten days and production costs by only 10 to 15 percent. The budget for both films was $373,445. It is estimated that deferred costs came to nearly $500,000 but in return United Artists gave the producers Herbert and Preminger 75% of the profits, 20% of which they gave to William Holden.

== Motion Picture Production Code objections ==
Herbert's play was first submitted to the MPAA/PCA for approval by Paramount Pictures in 1951, with Samuel J. Briskin as producer. On June 26, 1951, the office of MPAA censor Joseph Breen sent a letter back, stating that the script was unacceptable under the Motion Picture Production Code. Later, on July 13, 1951, the Breen office contacted Herbert and advised him his screenplay was in violation of the Production Code because of its "light and gay treatment of the subject of illicit sex and seduction." On December 26, Preminger submitted a revised draft of the script which, due to numerous lines of dialogue exhibiting "an unacceptably light attitude towards seduction, illicit sex, chastity, and virginity," was rejected on January 2, 1952. Contrary to later legend, the words "virgin," "mistress," and "pregnant," all of which had been in the original play's dialogue, were not singled out as objectionable. On January 6, Preminger and Herbert advised the Breen office they disagreed with its decision and would film the screenplay without further changes.

In a display of solidarity, United Artists heads Arthur B. Krim and Robert S. Benjamin amended their contract with Preminger and deleted the clause requiring him to deliver a film that would be granted a Production Code seal of approval. After ten days of rehearsals for each of his casts, Preminger began principal photography of both English- and German-language versions of the film on January 21, filming an English scene and then its German equivalent in quick succession. Preminger later stated he much preferred The Moon Is Blue to Die Jungfrau auf dem Dach because he felt that the psychology of the plot did not translate well. Filming was completed in twenty-four days and it previewed in Pasadena on April 8. Two days later, Breen notified Preminger the film would not be approved. Outraged at Breen's "unwarranted and unjustified attack" on "a harmless story", the director joined forces with United Artists executives to appeal the decision with the MPAA board of directors, who ruled against them.

== Distribution ==
United Artists decided to release the film without the PCA seal of approval, the first major American film to do so, initially in major urban markets where they hoped its success would encourage exhibitors in rural areas to book the film. The film premiered for an "adults only" audience at the Woods Theatre in Chicago on June 22 and opened at the United Nations Theater in San Francisco on June 25. On June 30, Variety reported that three major nationwide theater chains were willing to exhibit the film, and it went into general release on July 8, and was in the top five box-office successes of that week. (In its year-end report, Variety said the film had ranked #15 at the box office with a gross of $3.5 million.)

It was banned in Jersey City, New Jersey as "indecent and obscene". Theaters in many small towns in the United States restricted audiences to men or women separately. Kansas, Maryland and Ohio also banned the film, and Preminger and United Artists decided to bring suit in a Maryland court. On December 7, 1953, Judge Herman Moser reversed the State Censor Board. In his ruling, he called the film "a light comedy telling a tale of wide-eyed, brash, puppy-like innocence." Preminger and United Artists then appealed in Kansas (Holmby Productions, Inc. v. Vaughn), but the Supreme Court of Kansas upheld the state board of review's decision to ban the film. Determined to win, the director and studio took their case to the Supreme Court of the United States, which overturned the finding of the Kansas Supreme Court on October 24, 1955.

the question here is neither one of great art nor even of particularly good taste. It is rather a question of whether American movies are continually to be hamstrung by rules that confine picture themes, picture morals, and picture language to what is deemed fit for children, or for childlike mentalities.
— Saturday Review, 27 June 1953."

The film's success was instrumental in weakening the influence of the Production Code. On June 27, 1961, the PCA granted both The Moon Is Blue and The Man with the Golden Arm (1955), Preminger's similarly controversial release, the seals of approval they initially withheld.

== Critical reception ==
Bosley Crowther of The New York Times observed it "is not outstanding, either as a romance or as film. The wit of Mr. Herbert . . . is turned almost wholly on his freeness with the startling idea or phrase, as glibly tossed off (for the most part) by a young lady who appears a wide-eyed child. And Otto Preminger's lifting of the play from the stage to the screen is much too rigidly respectful of its conversational form. As a consequence, the movement is restricted and the talk is exceedingly long. At times, it gets awfully tedious, considering its limited range." Variety called it "an entertaining adult comedy", which "constantly reminds of its origin, being more a filmed play than a motion picture. But it's still entertaining theatre, whether behind the footlights or on celluloid." Harrison's Reports called it "vastly amusing adult entertainment", adding that "even though the material is spicy and has its delicate moments, it has been handled so adroitly that it is always amusing without ever becoming offensive." Richard L. Coe of The Washington Post called it "Flip, frolicsome fun", adding, "Otto Preminger's direction of Herbert's own screen play follows the stage action fairly closely, resulting in occasionally static splotches but the feel of flip sophistication is achieved." Edwin Schallert of the Los Angeles Times wrote that "this film is likely to induce a goodly share of laughter and have a special appeal to feminine audiences", but thought it "talks too much for complete satisfaction as a picture." The Chicago Tribune wrote that the film was "deftly constructed and moves along at a bright, brisk pace, peppered with some remarkably funny dialog, which sends audiences into such guffaws that some of the best lines are drowned in a sea of laughter." John McCarten of The New Yorker faulted the film for "all sorts of slowdowns ... to permit the principals to give out with their views on life, love and so on. However, as the photograph of a pleasant little comedy, the picture has some merit." The Monthly Film Bulletin called it "quite pleasant entertainment;" Time magazine also found the film to be pleasant.

The Catholic Legion of Decency gave the movie a "C", "Condemned" rating, despite giving the original play a milder "B", "Unobjectionable for adults" rating. The Catholic Parent-Teacher League condemned the movie. Francis Cardinal Spellman of New York and James Francis Cardinal McIntyre of Los Angeles urged Catholics to avoid the film.

Cardinal Spellman denounced the film on 24 June 1953 as "an occasion of sin" violating "standards of morality and decency." He said, "This picture was avowedly produced in defiance of the system of self-regulation which the motion picture industry itself has maintained for more than two decades. The producer refused to make any revision of the film and openly spurns the code of the American motion picture industry. I call the attention of Catholics to the pledge of the Legion of Decency, which emphasizes the obligation to avoid attendance at theatres that flaunt indecency by exhibiting such a picture."

In 1992 the Pacific Film Archive called it "an innocuous sex comedy that talks about bedding down but never turns a sheet" and observed: "the furor surrounding the film leaves the impression that a full-scale orgy had occurred."

In his review of the DVD release of the film, Tim Purtell of Entertainment Weekly called the film a "trifle" that "seems overly talky and slight".

On Rotten Tomatoes, the film holds a 46% rating based on nine reviews.

== Awards and nominations ==
Award	Category	Nominee(s)	Result	Ref.
Academy Awards	Best Actress	Maggie McNamara	Nominated	
Academy Awards	Best Film Editing	Otto Ludwig	Nominated	
Academy Awards	Best Song	"The Moon Is Blue"; Music by Herschel Burke Gilbert; Lyrics Sylvia Fine	Nominated	
British Academy Film Awards	Best Film from any Source		Nominated	
British Academy Film Awards	Most Promising Newcomer to Film	Maggie McNamara	Nominated	
Golden Globe Awards	Best Actor in a Motion Picture – Musical or Comedy	David Niven	Won	
Writers Guild of America Awards	Best Written American Comedy	F. Hugh Herbert	Nominated	

== Preservation ==
The Academy Film Archive preserved The Moon Is Blue in 2006.

== In popular culture ==
In 1982, the film was the focus of the M*A*S*H episode, "The Moon Is Not Blue". Having heard of the film's controversy, Hawkeye Pierce and B.J. Hunnicutt attempt to get a copy of the film shipped to the 4077th in Korea. But when they finally see the film, Hawkeye and B.J. are greatly disappointed as they expected sexually explicit content rather than a few mildly risqué comments. Hawkeye complains that he has never seen a cleaner movie in his life, and when Father Mulcahy points out that one of the characters did say "virgin", Hawkeye responds, "That's because everyone was!"

Otto Preminger's brother Ingo Preminger was producer of the theatrical version of MASH. In reality, The Moon Is Blue was released nineteen days before the armistice for the Korean War was signed.
