= Mayor and City Council of Baltimore v. Dawson =

Mayor and City Council of Baltimore City v. Dawson
- Supreme Court of the United States

Decided November 7, 1955
- Full case name: Mayor and City Council of Baltimore City v. Robert M. Dawson, Jr., et al.
- Citations: 350 U.S. 877 (more) 76 S. Ct. 133; 100 L. Ed. 774; 1955 U.S. LEXIS 168

Case history
- Prior: Lonesome v. Maxwell, 123 F. Supp. 193 (D. Md. 1954); reversed sub. nom., Dawson v. Mayor & City Council of Baltimore, 220 F.2d 386 (4th Cir. 1955)

Court membership
- Chief Justice Earl Warren Associate Justices Hugo Black · Stanley F. Reed; Felix Frankfurter · William O. Douglas; Harold H. Burton · Tom C. Clark; Sherman Minton · John M. Harlan II

Case opinion
- Per curiam

Mayor and City Council of Baltimore City v. Dawson, 350 U.S. 877 (1955), was a per curiam order by the Supreme Court of the United States affirming an order by the United States Court of Appeals for the Fourth Circuit that enjoined racial segregation in public beaches and bathhouses. The case arose from a challenge to segregation at Sandy Point State Park in Maryland.
