= Hey, Look Me Over (M*A*S*H) =

- M*A*S*H episode
- Episode no.: Season 11; Episode 1
- Directed by: Susan Oliver
- Written by: Alan Alda
- Production code: 1G21
- Original air date: October 25, 1982

Guest appearance
- Kellye Nakahara

Episode chronology
| ← Previous "That Darn Kid" | Next → "Trick or Treatment" |
- M*A*S*H season 11

"Hey, Look Me Over" was the 236th episode of the M*A*S*H television series, and the first episode of season eleven. The episode was first broadcast in the United States on October 25, 1982 on CBS.

== Plot ==
Nurse Lt. Kellye Yamato is continually frustrated by Hawkeye's attitude towards her - he is happy to talk to her or dance the Lindy in the Officer's Club, but as soon as a tall blonde nurse approaches, or a slow dance tune comes on the jukebox, he acts "like I'm Typhoid Mary". Kellye then gives Hawkeye the cold shoulder, but Hawkeye fails to see what he has done wrong, and the two subsequently argue, Kellye telling him "you haven’t the faintest idea how terrific I am". Tensions are already high among the nurses as a visiting colonel has arrived to perform a snap inspection on Major Houlihan, her nurses and their routines. During a nightshift in post-op, Hawkeye sees the error of his ways as he observes Kellye comforting a dying soldier. Hawkeye shows up at Kellye's tent dressed in a tuxedo, only to find her already on a date with the visiting colonel's aide. The following day, Hawkeye apologizes to Kellye and the two are seen dancing together cheek-to-cheek in the Officer's Club.

== Background ==
In the retrospective show Memories of M*A*S*H, Kellye Nakahara stated that Alan Alda approached her with the script for the episode to see if she would be interested in taking center-stage in an episode. Nakahara was originally hired as an extra for season 1 and had remained with the series since, and had graduated to speaking roles in many subsequent episodes.

The episode was Susan Oliver's first directing role.
