= Watkins v. United States =

- Supreme Court of the United States

Argued March 7, 1957 Decided June 17, 1957
- Full case name: John T. Watkins v. United States
- Citations: 354 U.S. 178 (more) 77 S. Ct. 1173; 1 L. Ed. 2d 1273; 1957 U.S. LEXIS 1558; 76 Ohio L. Abs. 225

Case history
- Prior: 233 F.2d 681 (D.C. Cir. 1956); cert. granted, 352 U.S. 822 (1956).

Holding
- Watkins was unable to determine his obligation to respond to questions posed to him and so was denied due process.

Court membership
- Chief Justice Earl Warren Associate Justices Hugo Black · Felix Frankfurter; William O. Douglas · Harold H. Burton; Tom C. Clark · John M. Harlan II; William J. Brennan Jr. · Charles E. Whittaker

Case opinions
- Majority: Warren, joined by Black, Frankfurter, Douglas, Harlan, Brennan
- Concurrence: Frankfurter
- Dissent: Clark
- Burton and Whittaker took no part in the consideration or decision of the case.

Watkins v. United States, 354 U.S. 178 (1957), is a decision of the Supreme Court of the United States that held that the power of the United States Congress is not unlimited in conducting investigations and that nothing in the United States Constitution gives it the authority to expose the private affairs of individuals.

== Background ==
John Thomas Watkins, a labor union official from Rock Island, Illinois, was convicted of contempt of Congress, a misdemeanor under 2 U.S.C. § 192, for failing to answer questions posed by members of Congress during a hearing held by a subcommittee of the House of Representatives Committee on Un-American Activities on April 29, 1954.

Watkins was born in July 1910 and ended his formal education in the eighth grade. At the time of his testimony he had four children and was working on behalf of the United Auto Workers (UAW) to unionize workers at a division of Firestone Tire and Rubber in Illinois. The UAW underwrote his legal expenses.

Watkins was asked to name people he knew to be members of the Communist Party. Watkins told the subcommittee that he did not wish to answer such questions and that they were outside the scope of the subjects on which he was summoned to testify and of the committee's jurisdiction. He said:

I am not going to plead the fifth amendment, but I refuse to answer certain questions that I believe are outside the proper scope of your committee's activities. I will answer any questions which this committee puts to me about myself. I will also answer questions about those persons whom I knew to be members of the Communist Party and whom I believe still are. I will not, however, answer any questions with respect to others with whom I associated in the past. I do not believe that any law in this country requires me to testify about persons who may in the past have been Communist Party members or otherwise engaged in Communist Party activity but who to my best knowledge and belief have long since removed themselves from the Communist movement.

I do not believe that such questions are relevant to the work of this committee nor do I believe that this committee has the right to undertake the public exposure of persons because of their past activities. I may be wrong, and the committee may have this power, but until and unless a court of law so holds and directs me to answer, I most firmly refuse to discuss the political activities of my past associates.

His conviction carried a fine of $1000 and a one-year suspended prison sentence. Watkins first won a 2–1 decision on appeal to the US Court of Appeals for the District of Columbia but then lost, 6–2, when that court heard the case en banc. The Supreme Court heard arguments on March 7, 1957, and announced its decision on June 17, 1957.

== Decision ==
The Supreme Court decided 6–1 to overturn Watkins' conviction. Chief Justice Earl Warren wrote for the majority. Warren noted that it is an offense for a witness to refuse to answer any question "pertinent to the question under inquiry" in testifying before a Congressional committee, but he wrote that the Court was unable to ascertain the nature of the Congressional inquiry with reasonable precision:

There are several sources that can outline the "question under inquiry" in such a way that the rules against vagueness are satisfied. The authorizing resolution, the remarks of the chairman or members of the committee, or even the nature of the proceedings themselves, might sometimes make the topic clear. This case demonstrates, however, that these sources often leave the matter in grave doubt.

The New York Times commented: "The Supreme Court has placed fundamental restrictions on a Congressional investigatory power that in recent years has been asserted as all but limitless."

Senators James Eastland and William E. Jenner, who played principal roles in investigating left-wing activities, issued a statement accusing the Court of contributing to "the trend of the past year of undermining our existent barriers against Communist subversion."

The decision's impact was limited in that the Court limited the application of the principles it espoused in Watkins.

== See also ==
- List of United States Supreme Court cases
- List of United States Supreme Court cases by the Warren Court
- List of United States Supreme Court cases, volume 354
- List of United States Supreme Court cases involving the First Amendment
