= List of United States Supreme Court cases, volume 350 =

This is a list of all the United States Supreme Court cases from volume 350 of the United States Reports:

Case name	Citation	Date decided
Lucy v. Adams	350 U.S. 1	1955
Chessman v. Teets	350 U.S. 3	1955
Mississippi v. Louisiana	350 U.S. 5	1955
United States ex rel. Toth v. Quarles	350 U.S. 11	1955
Corn Products Refining Company v. Commissioner	350 U.S. 46	1955
United States v. Anderson, Clayton and Company	350 U.S. 55	1955
Indian Towing Company v. United States	350 U.S. 61	1955
Neese v. Southern Railroad Company	350 U.S. 77	1955
Affronti v. United States	350 U.S. 79	1955
Reece v. Georgia	350 U.S. 85	1955
Michel v. Louisiana	350 U.S. 91	1955
National Labor Relations Board v. Warren Company	350 U.S. 107	1955
Arizona v. California	350 U.S. 114	1955
Pennsylvania ex rel. Herman v. Claudy	350 U.S. 116	1956
Ryan Stevedoring Company v. Pan-Atlantic Steamship Corporation	350 U.S. 124	1956
Rex Trailer Company v. United States	350 U.S. 148	1956
Local Union No. 25 of the International Brotherhood of Teamsters, Chauffeurs, Warehousemen and Helpers of America v. New York, New Haven and Hartford Railroad Company	350 U.S. 155	1956
Secretary of Agriculture v. United States	350 U.S. 162	1956
United States v. Minker	350 U.S. 179	1956
Bernhardt v. Polygraphic Company	350 U.S. 198	1956
Rea v. United States	350 U.S. 214	1956
United States v. Twin City Power Company	350 U.S. 222	1956
Steiner v. Mitchell	350 U.S. 247	1956
Mitchell v. King Packing Company	350 U.S. 260	1956
National Labor Relations Board v. Coca-Cola Bottling Company	350 U.S. 264	1956
Mastro Plastics Corporation v. National Labor Relations Board	350 U.S. 270	1956
United States v. Ryan	350 U.S. 299	1956
Commissioner v. Southwest Exploration Company	350 U.S. 308	1956
Shields v. Atlantic Coast Line Railroad Company	350 U.S. 318	1956
United Gas Pipe Line Company v. Mobile Gas Service Corporation	350 U.S. 332	1956
Federal Power Commission v. Sierra Pacific Power Co.	350 U.S. 348	1956
Gibson v. Lockheed Aircraft Service, Inc.	350 U.S. 356	1956
Costello v. United States	350 U.S. 359	1956
Greenwood v. United States	350 U.S. 366	1956
Remmer v. United States	350 U.S. 377	1956
United States v. Leslie Salt Company	350 U.S. 383	1956
Cammer v. United States	350 U.S. 399	1956
United States v. Contract Steel Carriers, Inc.	350 U.S. 409	1956
Florida ex rel. Hawkins v. Board of Control	350 U.S. 413	1956
United States v. Green	350 U.S. 415	1956
Ullmann v. United States	350 U.S. 422	1956
Millinery Central Building Corporation v. Commissioner	350 U.S. 456	1956
General Stores Corporation v. Shlensky	350 U.S. 462	1956
Mitchell v. Budd	350 U.S. 473	1956
Doud v. Hodge	350 U.S. 485	1956
Murdock Acceptance Corp. v. United States	350 U.S. 488	1956
Werner Machine Company v. Director	350 U.S. 492	1956
Petrowski v. Hawkeye-Security Insurance Company	350 U.S. 495	1956
Pennsylvania v. Nelson	350 U.S. 497	1956
In re Burwell	350 U.S. 521	1956
Schulz v. Pennsylvania Railroad Company	350 U.S. 523	1956
Collins v. American Buslines, Inc.	350 U.S. 528	1956
Archawski v. Hanioti	350 U.S. 532	1956
International Harvester Credit Corporation v. Goodrich	350 U.S. 537	1956
Slochower v. Board of Higher Education	350 U.S. 551	1956
Armstrong v. Armstrong	350 U.S. 568	1956
Holmby Productions, Inc. v. Vaughn	350 U.S. 870	1955, 1955
City of Baltimore v. Dawson	350 U.S. 877	1955
Holmes v. City of Atlanta	350 U.S. 879	1955
