= List of United States Supreme Court cases, volume 352 =

This is a list of all the United States Supreme Court cases from volume 352 of the United States Reports:

Case name	Citation	Date decided
Mesarosh v. United States	352 U.S. 1	1956
Bank of America National Trust and Savings Association v. Parnell	352 U.S. 29	1956
Brownell v. Chase National Bank	352 U.S. 36	1956
United States v. Bergh	352 U.S. 40	1956
United States v. Western Pacific Railroad Company	352 U.S. 59	1956
United States v. Chesapeake and Ohio Railway Company	352 U.S. 77	1956
Putnam v. Commissioner	352 U.S. 82	1956
Nelson v. City of New York	352 U.S. 103	1956
Walker v. City of Hutchinson	352 U.S. 112	1956
Massachusetts Bonding and Insurance Company v. United States	352 U.S. 128	1956
Leedom v. Mine Workers	352 U.S. 145	1956
Meat Cutters v. National Labor Relations Board	352 U.S. 153	1956
United States v. ICC	352 U.S. 158	1956
Brownell v. Tom We Shung	352 U.S. 180	1956
Leslie Miller, Inc. v. Arkansas	352 U.S. 187	1956
Fikes v. Alabama	352 U.S. 191	1957
United States v. Plesha	352 U.S. 202	1957
United States v. Howard	352 U.S. 212	1957
Leiter Minerals, Inc. v. United States	352 U.S. 220	1957
Delli Paoli v. United States	352 U.S. 232	1957
La Buy v. Howes Leather Company	352 U.S. 249	1957
Soriano v. United States	352 U.S. 270	1957
Jaffke v. Dunham	352 U.S. 280	1957
National Labor Relations Board v. Lion Oil Company	352 U.S. 282	1957
United States v. Allen-Bradley Company	352 U.S. 306	1957
National Lead Company v. Commissioner	352 U.S. 313	1957
Rayonier Inc. v. United States	352 U.S. 315	1957
Prince v. United States	352 U.S. 322	1957
In re Groban	352 U.S. 330	1957
Pollard v. United States	352 U.S. 354	1957
Senko v. LaCrosse Dredging Corp.	352 U.S. 370	1957
Butler v. Michigan	352 U.S. 380	1957
Nilva v. United States	352 U.S. 385	1957
United States v. Turley	352 U.S. 407	1957
Federal Trade Commission v. National Lead Company	352 U.S. 419	1957
Breithaupt v. Abram	352 U.S. 432	1957
Radovich v. National Football League	352 U.S. 445	1957
United States Gypsum Company v. National Gypsum Company	352 U.S. 457	1957
Pennsylvania Railroad Company v. Rychlik	352 U.S. 480	1957
Rogers v. Missouri Pacific Railroad Company	352 U.S. 500	1957
Webb v. Illinois Central Railroad Company	352 U.S. 512	1957
Herdman v. Pennsylvania Railroad Company	352 U.S. 518	1957
Ferguson v. Moore-McCormack Lines, Inc.	352 U.S. 521	1957
Johnson v. United States (1957)	352 U.S. 565	1957
United States v. Automobile Workers	352 U.S. 567	1957
Ceballos v. Shaughnessy	352 U.S. 599	1957
