= List of Alias Smith and Jones episodes =

This is a list of episodes of the western comedy TV series Alias Smith and Jones.

Alias Smith and Jones originally aired in the United States on ABC from January 1971 to January 1973. The series consisted of forty-eight 60-minute episodes and two 90-minute episodes. The first thirty-three episodes starred Pete Duel as Hannibal Heyes and Ben Murphy as Kid Curry. During the last seventeen episodes, Roger Davis played Hannibal Heyes.

== Series overview ==
Season	Episodes	Originally released	
Season	Episodes	First released	Last released
1	15	January 5, 1971	April 22, 1971
2	23	September 16, 1971	March 2, 1972
3	12	September 16, 1972	January 13, 1973

== Episodes ==
=== Season 1 (1971) ===
No. overall	No. in season	Title	Directed by	Written by	Original release date
1	1	"Alias Smith and Jones"	Gene Levitt	Story by : Glen A. Larson; Teleplay by : Glen A. Larson and Matthew Howard	January 5, 1971
2	2	"The McCreedy Bust"	Gene Levitt	Story by : John Thomas James; Teleplay by : Sy Salkowitz	January 21, 1971
3	3	"Exit from Wickenburg"	Jeannot Szwarc	Story by : John Thomas James; Teleplay by : Robert Hamner	January 28, 1971
4	4	"Wrong Train to Brimstone"	Jeffrey Hayden	Stephen Kandel	February 4, 1971
5	5	"The Girl in Boxcar #3"	Leslie H. Martinson	Story by : Gene Roddenberry; Teleplay by : Howard Browne	February 11, 1971
6	6	"The Great Shell Game"	Richard Benedict	Story by : John Thomas James; Teleplay by : Glen A. Larson	February 18, 1971
7	7	"Return to Devil’s Hole"	Bruce Kessler	Story by : John Thomas James; Teleplay by : Knut Swenson	February 25, 1971
8	8	"A Fistful of Diamonds"	Jeffrey Hayden	Story by : John Thomas James; Teleplay by : Robert Hamner	March 4, 1971
9	9	"Stagecoach Seven"	Richard Benedict	Story by : John Thomas James; Teleplay by : Dick Nelson	March 11, 1971
10	10	"The Man Who Murdered Himself"	Jeffrey Hayden	Story by : John Thomas James; Teleplay by : Robert Hamner and John Thomas James	March 18, 1971
11	11	"The Root of It All"	Barry Shear	Howard Browne	March 25, 1971
12	12	"The 5th Victim"	Fernando Lamas	Story by : John Thomas James; Teleplay by : Glen A. Larson	April 1, 1971
13	13	"Journey from San Juan"	Jeffrey Hayden	Story by : John Thomas James; Teleplay by : Dick Nelson	April 8, 1971
14	14	"Never Trust an Honest Man"	Douglas Heyes	Philip DeGuere	April 15, 1971
15	15	"The Legacy of Charlie O’Rourke"	Jeffrey Hayden	Story by : Robert Guy Barrows; Teleplay by : Dick Nelson	April 22, 1971

=== Season 2 (1971–72) ===
No. overall	No. in season	Title	Directed by	Written by	Original release date
16	1	"The Day They Hanged Kid Curry"	Barry Shear	Story by : John Thomas James; Teleplay by : Glen A. Larson	September 16, 1971
17	2	"How to Rob a Bank in One Hard Lesson"	Alexander Singer	Story by : John Thomas James; Teleplay by : David Moessinger	September 23, 1971
18	3	"Jailbreak at Junction City"	Jeffrey Hayden	Roy Huggins	September 30, 1971
19	4	"Smiler with a Gun"	Fernando Lamas	Story by : John Thomas James; Teleplay by : Max Hodge	October 7, 1971
20	5	"The Posse That Wouldn’t Quit"	Harry Falk	Story by : John Thomas James; Teleplay by : Pat Fielder	October 14, 1971
21	6	"Something to Get Hung About"	Jack Arnold	Story by : John Thomas James; Teleplay by : Nicholas E. Baehr and John Thomas James	October 21, 1971
22	7	"Six Strangers at Apache Springs"	Nicholas Colasanto	Story by : John Thomas James; Teleplay by : Arnold Somkin and John Thomas James	October 28, 1971
23	8	"Night of the Red Dog"	Russ Mayberry	Story by : John Thomas James; Teleplay by : Dick Nelson	November 4, 1971
24	9	"The Reformation of Harry Briscoe"	Barry Shear	Story by : John Thomas James; Teleplay by : B.W. Sandefur	November 11, 1971
25	10	"Dreadful Sorry, Clementine"	Barry Shear	Story by : John Thomas James; Teleplay by : Glen A. Larson	November 18, 1971
26	11	"Shootout at Diablo Station"	Jeffrey Hayden	Story by : John Thomas James; Teleplay by : William D. Gordon	December 2, 1971
27	12	"The Bounty Hunter"	Barry Shear	Story by : John Thomas James; Teleplay by : Nicholas E. Baehr	December 9, 1971
28	13	"Everything Else You Can Steal"	Alexander Singer	Roy Huggins	December 16, 1971
29	14	"Miracle at Santa Marta"	Vincent Sherman	Story by : John Thomas James; Teleplay by : Dick Nelson	December 30, 1971
30	15	"21 Days to Tenstrike"	Mel Ferber	Story by : John Thomas James; Teleplay by : Irving Pearlberg	January 6, 1972
31	16	"The McCreedy Bust: Going, Going, Gone!"	Alexander Singer	Story by : John Thomas James; Teleplay by : Nicholas E. Baehr	January 15, 1972
32	17	"The Man Who Broke the Bank at Red Gap"	Richard Benedict	Story by : John Thomas James; Teleplay by : Bronson Howitzer	January 20, 1972
33	18	"The Men That Corrupted Hadleyburg"	Jeff Corey	Story by : John Thomas James; Teleplay by : Dick Nelson	January 27, 1972
NOTE: This episode features the final appearance of Pete Duel in his co-starring role as Hannibal Heyes/Joshua Smith #1 in the series.
34	19	"The Biggest Game in the West"	Alexander Singer	Roy Huggins	February 3, 1972
NOTE: This episode features the first appearance of Roger Davis in his co-starring role as Hannibal Heyes/Joshua Smith in the series.
35	20	"Which Way to the OK Corral?"	Jack Arnold	Story by : John Thomas James; Teleplay by : Glen A. Larson	February 10, 1972
36	21	"Don't Get Mad, Get Even"	Bruce Bilson	Story by : John Thomas James; Teleplay by : Glen A. Larson	February 17, 1972
37	22	"What’s in It for Mia?"	John Dumas	Story by : John Thomas James; Teleplay by : William D. Gordon	February 24, 1972
38	23	"Bad Night in Big Butte"	Richard L. Bare	Story by : John Thomas James; Teleplay by : Glen A. Larson	March 2, 1972

=== Season 3 (1972–73) ===
No. overall	No. in season	Title	Directed by	Written by	Original release date
39	1	"The Long Chase"	Alexander Singer	John Thomas James	September 16, 1972
40	2	"High Lonesome Country"	Alexander Singer	Story by : John Thomas James; Teleplay by : Dick Nelson	September 23, 1972
41	3	"The McCreedy Feud"	Alexander Singer	Story by : John Thomas James; Teleplay by : Juanita Bartlett	September 30, 1972
42	4	"The Clementine Ingredient"	Jack Arnold	Story by : John Thomas James; Teleplay by : Gloryette Clark	October 7, 1972
43	5	"Bushwack!"	Jack Arnold	Story by : John Thomas James; Teleplay by : Roy Huggins and David Moessinger	October 21, 1972
44	6	"What Happened at the XST?"	Jack Arnold	Roy Huggins	October 28, 1972
45	7	"The Ten Days That Shook Kid Curry"	Edward M. Abroms	Story by : John Thomas James; Teleplay by : Gloryette Clark	November 4, 1972
46	8	"The Day the Amnesty Came Through"	Jeff Corey	Story by : John Thomas James; Teleplay by : Dick Nelson	November 25, 1972
47	9	"The Strange Fate of Conrad Meyer Zulick"	Richard Bennett	Story by : John Thomas James; Teleplay by : Nicholas E. Baehr	December 2, 1972
48	10	"McGuffin"	Alexander Singer	Story by : John Thomas James; Teleplay by : Nicholas E. Baehr	December 9, 1972
49	11	"Witness to a Lynching"	Richard Bennett	Story by : John Thomas James; Teleplay by : Nicholas E. Baehr	December 16, 1972
50	12	"Only Three to a Bed"	Jeffrey Hayden	Story by : John Thomas James; Teleplay by : Richard Morris	January 13, 1973
