= Divided We Stand =

- M*A*S*H episode
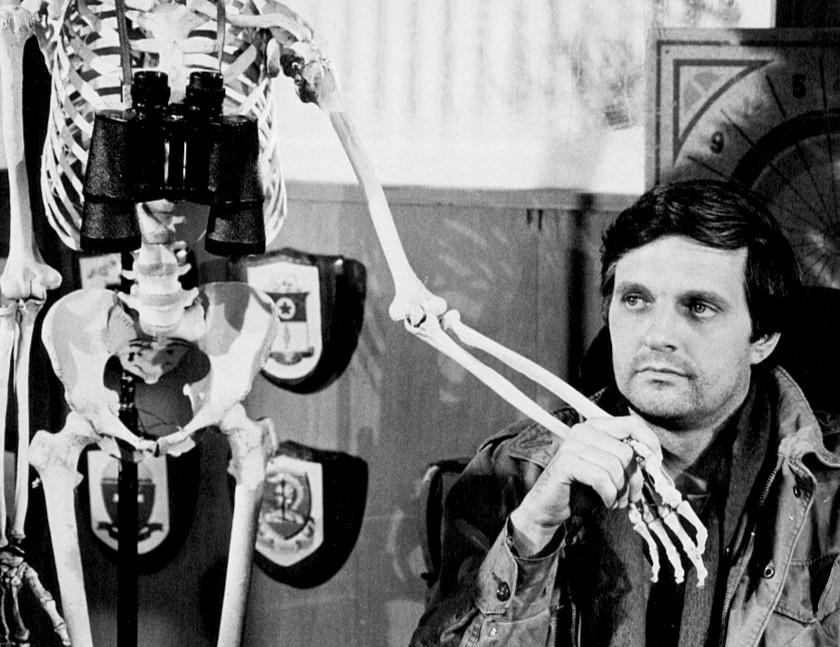
- Hawkeye ponders the fate of the 4077th
- Episode no.: Season 2 Episode 1
- Directed by: Jackie Cooper
- Written by: Larry Gelbart
- Production code: K401
- Original air date: September 15, 1973

Guest appearances
- Odessa Cleveland; Herb Voland; Anthony Holland

Episode chronology
← Previous "Showtime"	Next → "5 O'Clock Charlie"
- M*A*S*H season 2

"Divided We Stand" is the 25th episode of the television series M*A*S*H, and the first episode of season 2. The episode aired on September 13, 1973.

== Plot ==
Brigadier General Clayton briefs Captain Hildebrand, (Anthony Holland) a psychiatrist, on the 4077th. Clayton is sending Hildebrand to the 4077 M*A*S*H unit to assess whether the unit can function as a team. He is to recommend if the unit needs to be broken up or remain intact. His briefing serves as an introduction to the main characters.

When Captain Hildebrand arrives at the camp, he tells Henry about the assignment, warning him that it is to be kept a secret. Henry is very upset at the notion of his team being broken up. Even so, he is hard-pressed to explain such things as his dire need for a drink at the moment, and Klinger's cross-dressing.

Henry arranges a late-night meeting in the shower with Hawkeye and Trapper, where he tells them about Hildebrand. They promise to be on their best behavior.

Henry next confronts Margaret and Frank about the reasons behind Hildebrand's visit. Margaret confesses to sending a report to General Clayton denouncing Blake's command. Henry counters by saying that if the unit is broken up, Frank and Margaret will also be separated.

In the meantime, Hildebrand has been following Henry, observing him tipping off the staff as to the true nature of his visit.

The trumpet plays morning reveille. It wakes up the unit. They walk to the mess hall. Margaret, Frank, Hildebrand, Blake, Hawkeye, and Trapper eat breakfast. They try to be nice to one another, but their thinly veiled snide comments and forced attitude belie their discomfiture.

Hildebrand observes a number of incidents:

- While Margaret and Frank have a tryst, Hawkeye and Trapper nail their door shut.
- Frank and Margaret meet in the women's shower.
- A male soldier leaves the women's shower carrying his clothes.

Hildebrand gives his report to the officers, telling them they are childish and unprofessional. As he lectures them, they continue their childish, unprofessional behavior. Radar interrupts them and tells them that there are incoming wounded. They race to the operating room and go into action. Hildebrand watches as the team works together. He starts getting ill at what he sees and retires to the Swamp. He makes himself a drink. When the general arrives, he finds Hildebrand drunk in the officers' tent. Hildebrand gives him the following report: the 4077 are in an impossible situation, doing an impossible job, under impossible conditions, but he does not recommend breaking them up.

== Production notes ==
This episode reintroduces the premise and characters of the show as Brigadier General Crandall Clayton, considering breaking up the 4077th, sends Captain Hildebrand, a psychiatrist, to investigate the camp. Henry's attempts to make everyone get along, and thereby prevent the dissolution of his unit, are met with humorous results.

The episode ends with a camp loudspeaker announcement which is near-identical to the final loudspeaker announcement in the original MASH film, backed by an arrangement of the theme song which served as the opening music for three episodes in the first season.
