= 5 O'Clock Charlie =

- M*A*S*H episode
- Episode no.: Season 2 Episode 2
- Directed by: Norman Tokar
- Story by: Keith Walker
- Teleplay by: Larry Gelbart; Laurence Marks; Keith Walker
- Production code: K403
- Original air date: September 22, 1973

Guest appearances
- Odessa Cleveland; Herb Voland; Corey Fischer

Episode chronology
← Previous "Divided We Stand"	Next → "Radar's Report"
- M*A*S*H season 2

"5 O'Clock Charlie" is the 26th episode of the M*A*S*H television series, and second of season two. The episode aired on September 22, 1973.

== Plot ==
For six weeks, an ammunition dump near the camp has been the target of a punctual but inept North Korean bomber pilot. Every afternoon at 5:00, he flies overhead and attempts to hit the dump with a single hand-thrown bomb. The pilot, nicknamed "5 O'Clock Charlie", has been so reliably unsuccessful that the denizens of the 4077th have begun a daily betting pool based on how far away from the target his bomb will land. Only Frank and Margaret regard Charlie as a serious threat. Frank gets Henry to request an antiaircraft gun, and Brigadier General Crandall Clayton (Herb Voland) comes to the camp to assess the situation. Clayton, who has placed the dump near the hospital so that the enemy will leave it alone, is initially skeptical of the need for a gun. When Charlie's next bomb destroys Clayton's jeep, though, he agrees to send one.

Frank takes charge of the gun and begins to train three South Korean soldiers in its use, but Hawkeye and Trapper mock him and argue that the gun's presence will draw enemy fire toward the hospital. Prompted by the camp dentist, Captain Phil Cardozo (Corey Fischer), Hawkeye and Trapper begin devising plans to get rid of the dump and thus remove the need for the gun. They dye sheets with mercurochrome to make a target for Charlie to hit; after he misses yet again, they confuse Frank's men into aiming and firing the gun directly at the dump to destroy it. Charlie stops his daily raids, believing he has finally hit the dump, and the staff of the 4077th returns to their routine duties.

== Production ==
A Ryan PT-22 painted with North Korean markings was used for Charlie's plane.

The character of 5 O'Clock Charlie returns in the season-three episode "There Is Nothing Like a Nurse", in which the nursing staff is evacuated based on intelligence that points to an upcoming air raid on the 4077th. In the end, the "air raid" turns out to be 5 O'Clock Charlie, this time armed with propaganda leaflets.

== Notes ==
During the U.S. Pacific campaign of World War II—specifically, during the Guadalcanal campaign (1942–1943)—Japanese bombers would harass U.S. Army Air Force bases at night to deprive personnel of sleep. American troops subsequently gave these bombers various nicknames, such as "5 O'Clock Charlie", "Bed-Check Charlie", or "Washing-Machine Charlie". Various methods of harassment included overflights at full throttle with propellers at near-flat pitch, or deliberately unsynchronized engines.

One Washing-Machine Charlie appeared in the U.S. television comedy series McHale's Navy. Washing-Machine Charlie was also discussed in Gregory Boyington's autobiography and made appearances in Black Sheep Squadron, the television show loosely based on Boyington's World War II exploits.
