= Barbara Bostock =

American actress

- Born: December 19, 1935 (age 90); Palm Beach, Florida, U.S.
- Occupation: Actress
- Years active: 1957–1977

Barbara Bostock (born December 19, 1935) is a retired American actress. She was sometimes credited as Barbara Lawson.

== Early years ==
Bostock was born in Palm Beach, Florida as an only child to George Bostock, a shoemaker, who came to Florida from Georgia, and his wife Frances. When she was 8 years old, she began dancing. Bostock went to Palm Beach High School.

== Career ==
In 1955, Bostock appeared on Broadway in Silk Stockings at the Imperial Theatre. Afterwards, she replaced Pat Stanley in the role of "Gladys" in the national tour of The Pajama Game. In 1957 she made her TV debut on The George Gobel Show and made her movie debut in 1958 when she was cast in the films Girls on the Loose and Senior Prom.

She appeared in the Jerry Lewis film Visit to a Small Planet (1960) as the beatnik dancer, Desdemona, under the name Barbara Lawson. She also appears in an episode of The Millionaire: Season 6, Episode 26, along with Dennis Hopper and Jack Larson under that stage name.

Bostock was active in summer stock musicals, including Annie Get Your Gun and Can-Can in the early 1960s.

The rest of her brief career was spent in television, making guest appearances in Route 66, General Electric Theater, I Dream of Jeannie, and The Rookies. She also had roles in the TV movies Delancey Street: The Crisis Within and The Spell (1977), with Lee Grant.

Bostock's biggest role was in the ABC comedy, Love on a Rooftop, starring Pete Duel and Judy Carne as Dave and Julie Willis, a young newlywed couple. Their neighbors and best friends were Stan (Rich Little) and Carol Parker. As Carol, Bostock appeared in each of the 30 episodes of the series.

She portrayed Margaret on The Farmer's Daughter TV series.

Bostock in 1960 also was a guest star on Route 66, "Play it Glissando" (first season).
