= M*A*S*H season 2 =

M*A*S*H
- Season 2
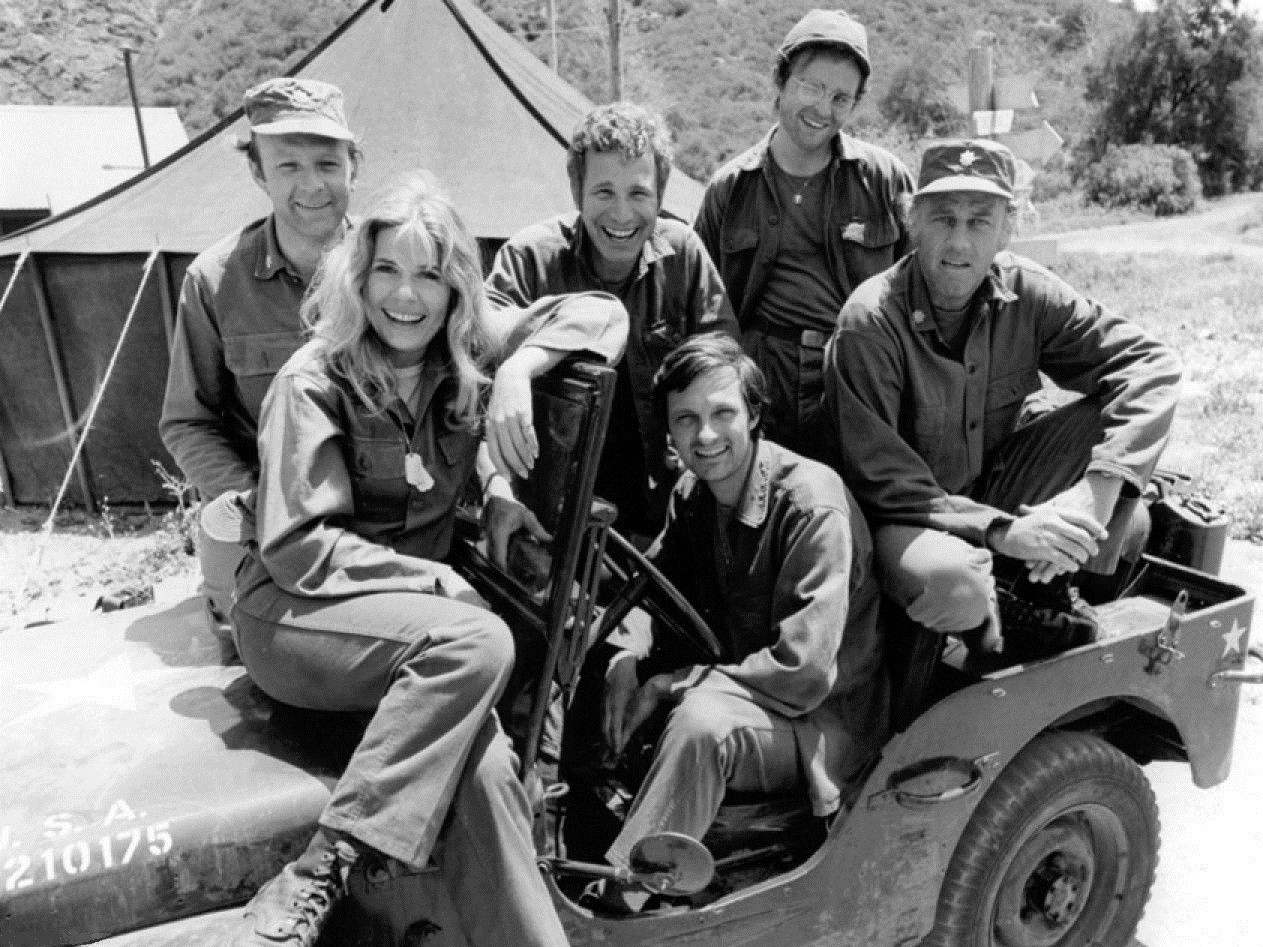
- The cast of M*A*S*H from Season 2, 1974 (clockwise from left): Loretta Swit, Larry Linville, Wayne Rogers, Gary Burghoff, McLean Stevenson, and Alan Alda
- No. of episodes: 24

Release
- Original network: CBS
- Original release: September 15, 1973 – March 2, 1974

Season chronology
- ← Previous; Season 1 Next → Season 3

The second season of M*A*S*H aired Saturdays at 8:30–9:00 pm on CBS from September 15, 1973 to March 2, 1974.

== Cast ==
=== Main ===
- Alan Alda as Capt. Benjamin Franklin "Hawkeye" Pierce
- Wayne Rogers as Capt. "Trapper" John MacIntyre
- McLean Stevenson as Lt. Col. Henry Blake
- Loretta Swit as Maj. Margaret "Hot Lips" Houlihan
- Larry Linville as Maj. Frank "Ferret Face" Burns
- Gary Burghoff as Cpl. Walter "Radar" O'Reilly

=== Recurring ===
- William Christopher as Lt. Father Francis Mulcahy
- Odessa Cleveland as Lt. Ginger Bayliss
- Jamie Farr as Cpl. Maxwell Klinger
- Johnny Haymer as SSgt. Zelmo Zale †
- Jeff Maxwell as Pvt. Igor Straminsky †
- Linda Meiklejohn as Lt. Leslie Scorch ‡
- Kellye Nakahara as Lt. Kellye Nakahara †
- Robert F. Simon as Maj. Gen. Maynard Mitchell †‡
- Herb Voland as Brig. Gen. Crandell Clayton ‡

Notes

- † First season as a recurring character
- ‡ Last season as a recurring character

== Episodes ==
No. overall	No. in season	Title (Note: Titles taken from DVD)	Directed by (Note: Credits from episode title cards)	Written by	Original release date	Prod. code (Note: Production Code from end credits)
25	1	"Divided We Stand"	Jackie Cooper	Larry Gelbart	September 15, 1973	K-401
A psychiatrist (Anthony Holland) is sent to the 4077th to examine their behavior and decide whether they should be reassigned.
26	2	"5 O'Clock Charlie"	Norman Tokar	Story by : Keith Walker; Teleplay by : Larry Gelbart & Laurence Marks and Keith Walker	September 22, 1973	K-403
An inept North Korean bomber pilot provides entertainment for the camp, but prompts Frank to call for heavy artillery.
27	3	"Radar's Report"	Jackie Cooper	Story by : Sheldon Keller; Teleplay by : Laurence Marks	September 29, 1973	K-402
October 17, 1951 Radar writes about the typical shenanigans during a week at the 4077th: Hawkeye tries to romance a new Nurse; Trapper John loses a patient; Houlihan and Burns push Blake for Klinger's Section 8 (military) discharge; a wounded prisoner goes berserk in the O.R. Allan Arbus makes his first appearance as Dr. Freedman (here first-named Milton but later changed to Sidney). Laurence Marks and Sheldon Keller received a Writers Guild Award nomination for this episode.
28	4	"For the Good of the Outfit"	Jackie Cooper	Jerry Mayer	October 6, 1973	K-404
Hawkeye and Trapper try to get the Army brass to report a "friendly fire" shelling near a South Korean village, and take responsibility for it. Despite the army rebuilding the village, Hawkeye still wants an admission of the truth. Margaret and Frank insist on presenting their version but Hawkeye insists on reading about it in Stars and Stripes first before handing over Frank's evidence. To show their gratitude, Trapper kisses Margaret and Hawkeye goes after Frank.
29	5	"Dr. Pierce and Mr. Hyde"	Jackie Cooper	Alan Alda and Robert Klane	October 13, 1973	K-405
Hawkeye has been in the OR for so long, 20 hours, followed by a 2nd stint and a 3rd without rest, that he's going over the edge — and he's decided to put a stop to the war. During the night, he sends a telegram to President Harry S. Truman and another copy to the Secretary of the United Nations. The next day, after a night without rest, he again performs surgery for a total of 3 days straight without rest.
30	6	"Kim"	William Wiard	Marc Mandel and Larry Gelbart & Laurence Marks	October 20, 1973	K-407
The 4077th tries to mother a wounded Korean boy who may have been orphaned. While with Hotlips and Frank, he wanders into the middle of the mine field. Trapper is trapped in the middle. Sister Theresa arrives with Kim's mother to pick him up.
31	7	"L.I.P. (Local Indigenous Personnel)"	William Wiard	Story by : Carl Kleinschmitt; Teleplay by : Carl Kleinschmitt and Larry Gelbart & Laurence Marks	October 27, 1973	K-406
Hawkeye tries to help a GI cut through Army bureaucracy so he can marry his child's Korean mother. Episode features Burt Young.
32	8	"The Trial of Henry Blake"	Don Weis	McLean Stevenson	November 3, 1973	K-408
Henry is put on trial for charges made by Frank and Margaret regarding his command of the 4077th. Hawkeye blackmails Frank and Hotlips into withdrawing the charges. McLean Stevenson (Henry Blake) received a Primetime Emmy Award nomination for writing this episode.
33	9	"Dear Dad... Three"	Don Weis	Larry Gelbart & Laurence Marks	November 10, 1973	K-409
Hawkeye writes a third letter to his father describing a bigoted soldier (Mills Watson), a live grenade in the OR, and home movies for Henry.
34	10	"The Sniper"	Jackie Cooper	Richard M. Powell	November 17, 1973	K-410
A lone sniper attacks the 4077th, forcing the camp into lockdown and deal with wounded while waiting for help from headquarters. Featuring Teri Garr.
35	11	"Carry On, Hawkeye"	Jackie Cooper	Story by : Bernard Dilbert; Teleplay by : Bernard Dilbert and Larry Gelbart & Laurence Marks	November 24, 1973	K-411
Hawkeye and Margaret are the only ones able to work during a flu epidemic. Jackie Cooper won the Primetime Emmy Award for directing this episode.
36	12	"The Incubator"	Jackie Cooper	Larry Gelbart & Laurence Marks	December 1, 1973	K-412
Hawkeye and Trapper attempt to obtain an incubator for the 4077th. In this episode a crooked army colonel refers to selling, among other things, "the odd B-52," but this is an error by the writers as the B-52 did not enter service until after the Korean War. It is Radar who ends up delivering the goods.
37	13	"Deal Me Out"	Gene Reynolds	Larry Gelbart & Laurence Marks	December 8, 1973	K-413
A weekly poker game proceeds in spite of Radar accidentally hitting a civilian with a jeep and an enlisted man (John Ritter) holding Frank hostage in the showers. Edward Winter guest stars as Captain Halloran and would return in several episodes as Colonel Flagg. Episode also features Allan Arbus and Pat Morita. Gene Reynolds received Directors Guild Award and Primetime Emmy Award nominations for this episode.
38	14	"Hot Lips and Empty Arms"	Jackie Cooper	Linda Bloodworth & Mary Kay Place	December 15, 1973	K-414
Upsetting news from home makes Margaret examine her life and request a transfer. Linda Bloodworth and Mary Kay Place received a Primetime Emmy Award nomination for writing this episode.
39	15	"Officers Only"	Jackie Cooper	Ed Jurist	December 22, 1973	K-415
Something stinks at the 4077th and it could be the new officers' club that bars enlisted men. Hawkeye then invites all of his "relatives" to the Officers Club after the General's son is allowed entry.
40	16	"Henry in Love"	Don Weis	Larry Gelbart & Laurence Marks	January 5, 1974	K-416
Henry endangers his marriage when he returns from Tokyo in love with another woman less than half his age, but when she visits camp she forgets all about Henry and secretly flirts with Hawkeye.
41	17	"For Want of a Boot"	Don Weis	Sheldon Keller	January 12, 1974	K-417
Hawkeye's efforts to secure a new pair of boots ends up in a never-ending game of horse trading.
42	18	"Operation Noselift"	Hy Averback	Story by : Paul Richards and Erik Tarloff; Teleplay by : Erik Tarloff	January 19, 1974	K-418
A private with a big nose asks for prohibited plastic surgery. Episode features Stuart Margolin and Todd Susman.
43	19	"The Chosen People"	Jackie Cooper	Story by : Gerry Renert & Jeff Wilhelm; Teleplay by : Laurence Marks & Sheldon Keller & Larry Gelbart	January 26, 1974	K-419
A local farmer and his family claims the 4077th is on their land, while a Korean woman claims Radar is the father of her child. Loretta Swit does not appear in this episode.
44	20	"As You Were"	Hy Averback	Story by : Gene Reynolds; Teleplay by : Larry Gelbart & Laurence Marks	February 2, 1974	K-420
Frank asks Hawkeye and Trapper to give him a hernia operation while there are no casualties but then the casualties start coming in. The PA announces the release of Nazi War Criminal Alfred Krupp; Historical fact: Alfred Krupp was pardoned January 31, 1951.
45	21	"Crisis"	Don Weis	Larry Gelbart & Laurence Marks	February 9, 1974	K-421
A vital supply line is cut at the 4077th, creating a rash of shortages and forcing people to bunk up together.
46	22	"George"	Gene Reynolds	Regier & Markowitz (Note: John W. Regier & Gary Markowitz)	February 16, 1974	K-422
Hawkeye learns that a patient's own unit beat him up because he's gay, while Frank wants to give the soldier a dishonorable discharge.
47	23	"Mail Call"	Alan Alda	Larry Gelbart & Laurence Marks	February 23, 1974	K-423
Mail comes to the 4077th. Hawkeye and Trapper decide to take advantage of Frank's greed, Trapper is depressed after getting a letter and pictures from his daughters, while Klinger takes another stab at a discharge.
48	24	"A Smattering of Intelligence"	Larry Gelbart	Larry Gelbart & Laurence Marks	March 2, 1974	K-424
When a pair of intelligence officers from different agencies investigate perceived security risks at the 4077th, Hawkeye and Trapper decide to have some fun at their expense. Edward Winter makes his first appearance as Lt. Colonel Flagg (he previously appeared as Captain Halloran in the episode Deal Me Out).
