= Love on a Rooftop =

American television sitcom

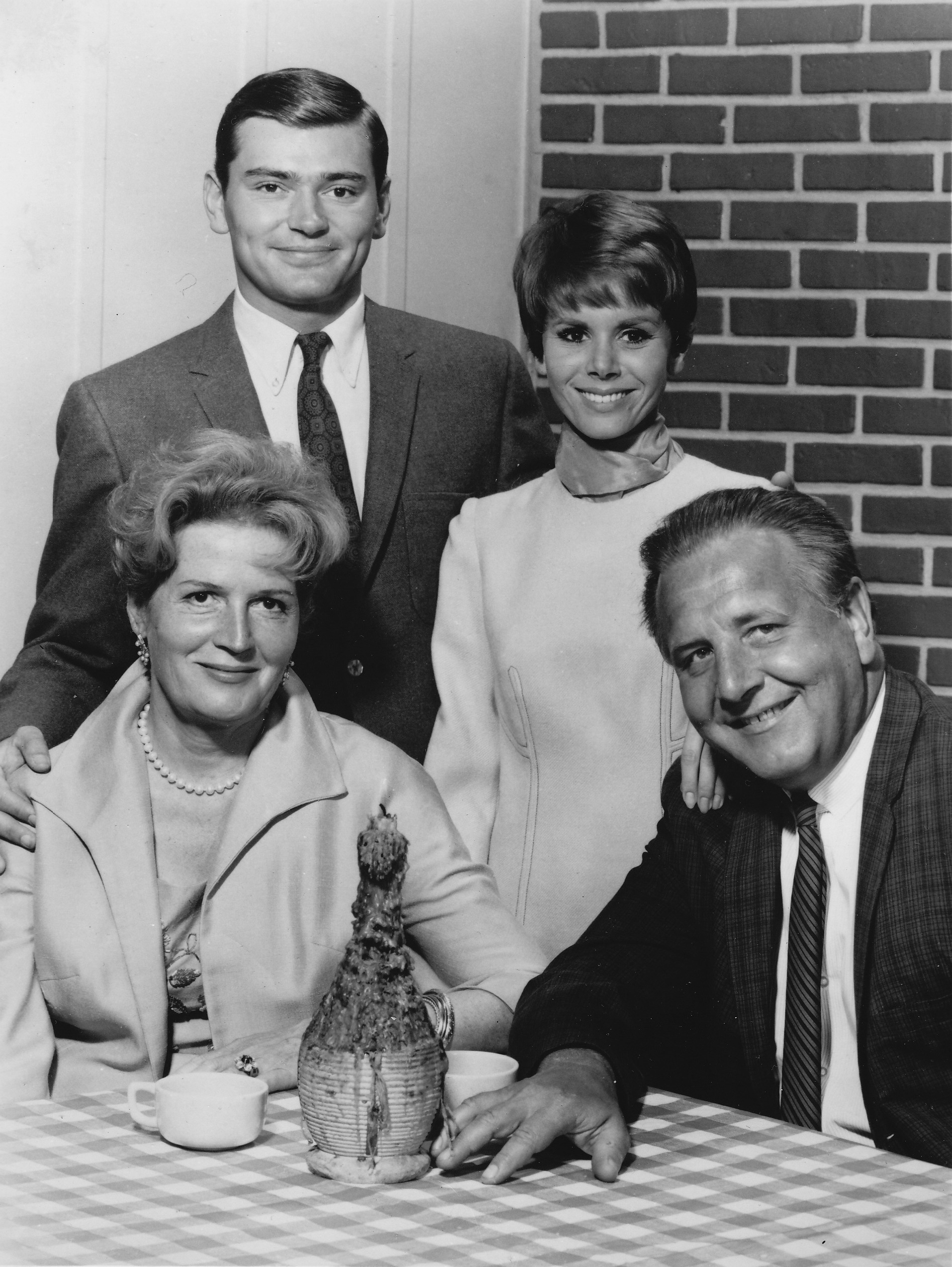
- Love on a Rooftop cast: (Top, L–R) Peter Duel (Dave Willis), Judy Carne (Julie Hammond Willis), (Bottom, L–R) Edith Atwater (Phyllis Hammond), Herb Voland (Fred Hammond)
- Genre: Sitcom
- Created by: Harry Ackerman; Bernard Slade
- Starring: Peter Deuel; Judy Carne
- Theme music composer: Mundell Lowe; Howard Greenfield; Jack Keller
- Composers: Warren Barker; Mundell Lowe
- Country of origin: United States
- Original language: English
- No. of seasons: 1
- No. of episodes: 30

Production
- Executive producer: Harry Ackerman
- Producer: E.W. Swackhamer
- Cinematography: Emil Oster
- Camera setup: Single-camera
- Running time: 22–24 minutes
- Production company: Screen Gems

Original release
- Network: ABC
- Release: September 6, 1966 – April 6, 1967

Love on a Rooftop is an American sitcom about a newlywed couple, Dave and Julie Willis, and their humorous struggles to survive in San Francisco on Dave's apprentice architect's salary of $85.37 a week. Matters were complicated by the fact that Julie's rich father did not approve of their less than luxurious lifestyle and often took it upon himself to try to improve it, much to Dave's chagrin.

The series was produced by Screen Gems, the production company behind shows such as Gidget, Bewitched, and I Dream of Jeannie. It premiered on September 6, 1966 on ABC and starred Pete Duel, credited at the time as Peter Deuel, and Judy Carne in the leads. Also in the regular cast were Rich Little and Barbara Bostock as the Willises’ neighbors, and Herb Voland and Edith Atwater as Julie's parents. All thirty episodes of the series were filmed in color.

== Plot ==
Apprentice architect Dave Willis meets art student Julie Hammond when his liverwurst on pumpernickel sandwich falls into her bag while she is passing by a building on which he is working. In pursuit of his lunch, he chases after her until she stops in a local park. Upon getting his first good look at Julie, Dave loses interest in the sandwich and the two start to talk. So begins a whirlwind courtship that quickly leads to marriage, despite Dave's misgivings about getting married while he only makes $85.37 a week.

In need of new housing, Julie finds an unfurnished converted store room with no windows but has direct access to the roof of the apartment building which offers a sweeping view of San Francisco. Julie feels that the place has charm and atmosphere, and that the rent is cheap.

The newlywed couple becomes friends with fellow tenants Stan and Carol Parker. Stan quickly develops the habit of coming into their apartment unannounced in order to share his ideas with them. Also in the habit of showing up unannounced, although much less welcome than Stan, is Julie's father, Fred Hammond, who is always finding a way to meddle in Dave and Julie's lives, while his ever-patient wife, Phyllis, watches in amusement. Dave, however, is adamant that he and Julie will not accept Fred's help, especially if it is monetary, a stance that causes much contention between the two men.

The humor in the series is formed, not simply out of the situations in which the characters find themselves, but out of the ways in which the differing personalities that regularly pass through the Willises’ apartment react to the situations and, in the process, to each other.

== Characters ==
Dave Willis (Pete Duel) is an apprentice architect who strongly believes in the importance of being practical. His wife, Julie Willis {born Julie Hammond} (Judy Carne), an art student, is the opposite, placing more emphasis on attending to the needs of the heart and soul than on keeping the budget.

Fred Hammond (Herb Voland) is Julie's father. He owns nine used car lots and is quite wealthy because of it, a fact that he often points out to Dave. Fred is reluctant to let go of his daughter and spends much of his time trying to protect her from what he sees as the life of abject poverty to which Dave has doomed her. Phyllis Hammond (Edith Atwater) is much more understanding than her husband and does her best to welcome Dave into the family, even though Fred would prefer he get out.

Stan (Rich Little) and Carol Parker (Barbara Bostock) live in the same apartment building as the Willises. Stan is an eccentric who never holds a steady job because he spends most of his time coming up with inventions and oddball moneymaking schemes. Carol is his devoted wife who has full faith in all of his ideas. Both are Dave and Julie's best friends.

== Episodes ==
| No. | Title | Directed by | Written by | Original release date |
|---|---|---|---|---|
| 1 | "Pilot" | E.W. Swackhamer | Albert Mannheimer | September 6, 1966 |
Note: The unaired version of the pilot episode credits Bernard Slade as the sole writer. In the final version, he was credited as teleplay writer.
| 2 | "117 Ways to Cook Hamburger" | E.W. Swackhamer | Bernard Slade | September 13, 1966 |
| 3 | "My Husband, the Knight" | E.W. Swackhamer | Bernard Slade | September 20, 1966 |
| 4 | "The Big Brass Bed" | E.W. Swackhamer | Bernard Slade | September 27, 1966 |
| 5 | "The Six Dollar Surprise" | E.W. Swackhamer | Bernard Slade | October 4, 1966 |
| 6 | "The Chocolate Hen" | E.W. Swackhamer | Bernard Slade | October 11, 1966 |
| 7 | "Homecoming" | E.W. Swackhamer | Bernard Slade | October 18, 1966 |
| 8 | "One Picture Is Worth…" | E.W. Swackhamer | Bernard Slade | October 25, 1966 |
| 9 | "Chinchilla Rag" | Robert Rosenbaum | James Henerson | November 1, 1966 |
| 10 | "Who Is Sylvia?" | Claudio Guzmán | Richard Baer | November 15, 1966 |
| 11 | "War on a Rooftop" | E.W. Swackhamer | Bernard Slade | November 22, 1966 |
| 12 | "Dave's Night Out" | Claudio Guzmán | John McGreevey | November 29, 1966 |
| 13 | "There's Got to Be Something Wrong with Her" | Jerry Bernstein | John McGreevey | December 6, 1966 |
| 14 | "But Is It Really You?" | E.W. Swackhamer | Bernard Slade | December 13, 1966 |
| 15 | "The Fifty Dollar Misunderstanding" | Alex Grashoff | James Henerson | December 20, 1966 |
| 16 | "Frocks of Trouble" | Claudio Guzmán | Barbara Avedon | December 27, 1966 |
| 17 | "Going Home to Daughter" | Robert Ellenstein | James Henerson | January 3, 1967 |
| 18 | "Let It Rain" | E.W. Swackhamer | Dorothy Cooper | January 12, 1967 |
| 19 | "King of the Castle" | Jerry Bernstein | Bernard Slade | January 19, 1967 |
| 20 | "My Father, the TV Star" | Richard Kinon | Bernard Slade | January 26, 1967 |
| 21 | "Who Was That Husband I Saw You With?" | Gene Reynolds | Marty Roth | February 2, 1967 |
| 22 | "Shotgun Honeymoon" | Mack Bing | Dorothy Cooper Foote | February 9, 1967 |
| 23 | "Musical Apartments" | Jerry Bernstein | James Henerson | February 16, 1967 |
| 24 | "Low Calorie Love" | Russell Mayberry | Tom & Helen August | February 23, 1967 |
| 25 | "The Sell Out" | Leo Phillips | Ron Friedman | March 2, 1967 |
| 26 | "The Letter Bug" | Russell Mayberry | James Henerson | March 9, 1967 |
| 27 | "Debt of Gratitude" | Russell Mayberry | John McGreevey | March 16, 1967 |
| 28 | "Murder in Apartment D" | Jerry Bernstein | Bernard Slade | March 23, 1967 |
| 29 | "One Too Many Cooks" | Mack Bing | James Henerson | March 30, 1967 |
| 30 | "Stork on a Rooftop" | E.W. Swackhamer | Bernard Slade | April 6, 1967 |

== Production ==
The series was inspired by the Broadway play Barefoot in the Park.

The series initially aired Tuesday nights at 9:30, but it was later moved to Thursday nights at 9:00.

In an interview conducted while the series was still in production, Judy Carne stated that she and co-star Pete Duel had "a love-hate relationship" and that many of the problems that they had on set were caused by Carne's insistence on punctuality and Duel's tendency to show up late. However, Carne would also later remember Duel as a kind and caring man who was very protective of her.

Mundell Lowe composed the original theme music, a breezy, swinging jazz/big band instrumental in a 3/4 waltz tempo. Midway through the season, a new theme song was commissioned from Howard Greenfield and Jack Keller; this new theme was in a 4/4 tempo and had a faster, more "exciting" rhythm.

== Reception ==
Love on a Rooftop premiered with ratings of 30.4 million viewers, and a market share of 56.8. The series premiered during an advance premiere week, where ABC-TV premiered its new programs a week before the other networks. This likely led to the first episode having better ratings than it would have had otherwise, because it had virtually no competition. The series received fairly positive reviews, with Variety calling it "one of the pleasanter entries of the new season." Bob Shiels of the Calgary Herald preferred its first episode to that of the also new Star Trek, concluding that "Love on a Rooftop should be good for a lot of laughs".

The ratings quickly dropped as the season went on, and the series was moved from Tuesday to Thursday night. The series was cancelled at the end of its first season. However, both Judy Carne and Peter Deuel continued with their television careers – she, as a regular on Rowan & Martin's Laugh-In, and he changing his name to Pete Duel and co-starring in Alias Smith and Jones, which ended shortly after his death in 1971.

During the summer of 1971 (when Duel was starring in Alias Smith and Jones), ABC re-broadcast Love on a Rooftop. The series was never sold into syndication and has not been seen on television since. It has been cited as an influence on the 1990s sitcom Dharma and Greg.
