= Girls on the Loose =

1958 film by Paul Henreid

- Directed by: Paul Henreid
- Screenplay by: Alan Friedman; Dorothy Raison; Allen Rivkin.
- Story by: Alan Friedman; Dorothy Raison; Julian Harmon
- Produced by: Edward B. Barison; Richard Kay; Harry Rybnick
- Starring: Mara Corday; Lita Milan; Barbara Bostock; Mark Richman
- Cinematography: Philip Lathrop
- Edited by: Edward Curtiss
- Production company: Jewell Enterprises
- Distributed by: Universal Pictures
- Release date: April 1958
- Running time: 78 minutes
- Country: United States
- Language: English

Girls on the Loose is a 1958 American crime film noir directed by Paul Henreid and starring Mara Corday, Lita Milan, and Barbara Bostock.

== Plot ==
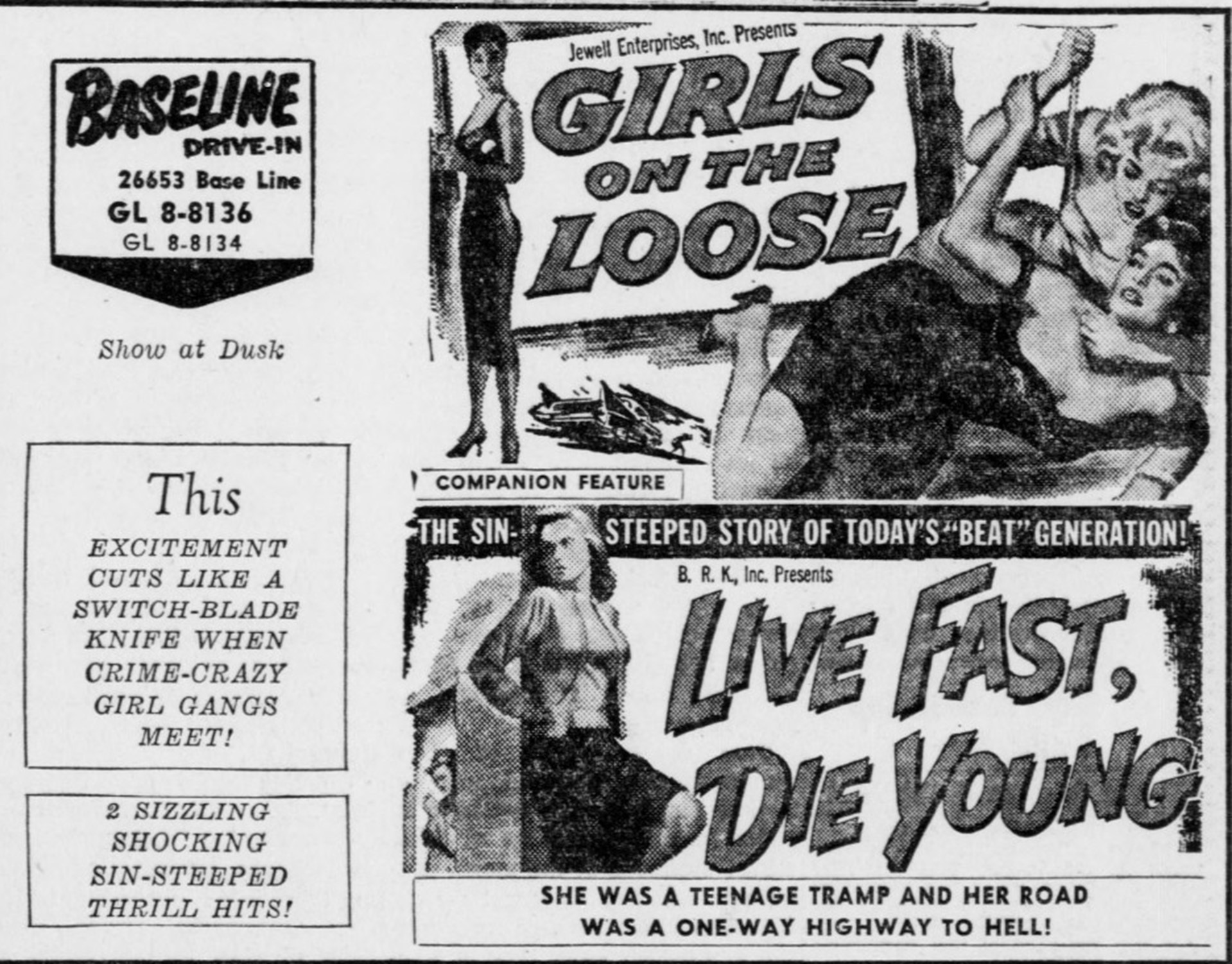
Drive-in advertisement from 1958

Vera (Mara Corday) runs a nightclub that's really a front for her secret operation: an all-female crime ring that's been pulling off heist after heist. The gang does a major job with the help of Agnes (Abby Dalton), a new recruit and insider with access to a bank's payroll. But then the nervous Agnes threatens to squeal, so Vera has her rubbed out. And when Vera's good-girl sister, Helen (Barbara Bostock), starts dating suspicious policeman Bill (Mark Richman), Vera gets cutthroat.

== Cast ==
- Mara Corday as Vera Parkinson
- Lita Milan as Marie Williams
- Barbara Bostock as Helen Parkinson
- Peter Mark Richman as Police Lt. Bill Hanley (as Mark Richman)
- Joyce Barker as Joyce Johanneson
- Abby Dalton as Agnes Clark
- Jon Lormer as Doctor
- Ronald Green as Danny
- Fred Kruger as Mr. Grant
- Paul Lambert as Joe
- Monika Henreid as Lilly (as Monica Elizabeth Henreid)

== Reception ==
Writing for Turner Classic Movies, critic Nathaniel Thompson described the film as a "low-budget oddity" that is "a proud member [of] the girl gang genre," but which is "elevated by a strong, provocative lead bad girl in the form of Corday."
