= Senior Prom (film) =

1958 film by David Lowell Rich

- Directed by: David Lowell Rich
- Written by: Hal Hackady
- Produced by: Harry A. Romm
- Starring: Jill Corey; Paul Hampton; James Komack; Barbara Bostock; Tom Laughlin
- Cinematography: Fred Jackman Jr.
- Edited by: Al Clark
- Music by: Van Alexander
- Distributed by: Columbia Pictures
- Release date: December 1958
- Running time: 82 minutes
- Country: United States
- Language: English

Senior Prom is a 1958 American musical film directed by David Lowell Rich and starring Jill Corey and Paul Hampton, as well as a rare non-Stooge appearance by Moe Howard.

== Plot ==
The story of a student who becomes a disc-star and finds romance.

== Cast ==
- Jill Corey as Gay Sherridan
- Paul Hampton as Tom Harper
- James Komack as Dog
- Barbara Bostock as Flip
- Tom Laughlin as Carter Breed III
- Keely Smith as the Singer
