= George (M*A*S*H) =

- M*A*S*H episode
- Episode no.: Season 2 Episode 22
- Directed by: Gene Reynolds
- Written by: John W. Regier; Gary Markowitz
- Production code: K422
- Original air date: February 16, 1974

Episode chronology
← Previous "Crisis"	Next → "Mail Call"
- M*A*S*H season 2

"George" is the 46th episode of the M*A*S*H television series, and 22nd episode of season two. The episode aired on February 16, 1974.

== Plot ==
Among the latest batch of wounded soldiers treated at the 4077th is a young soldier, Private George Weston (Richard Ely), who is also heavily bruised in addition to the leg wound he received in battle. After brushing off Frank Burns' (Larry Linville) suggestions he had been involved in a fight, Weston confides to Hawkeye (Alan Alda) that he had been beaten up by soldiers from his unit after he got drunk and inadvertently admitted to being a homosexual. Back in their quarters, Hawkeye and Trapper (Wayne Rogers) discuss the beatings and Frank admits he finds Weston's sexuality "disgusting", in contrast to his initial admiration of Weston for being on frontline active service. Frank initiates moves to have Weston dishonorably discharged from the Army. In order to convince Frank not to proceed, Hawkeye and Trapper stage a mock argument, during which Trapper 'confesses' to having bought the answers for a medical school examination, which leads Frank to admit that he did, too. Hawkeye and Trapper admit their ruse and Frank is persuaded to drop his actions.

== Critical response ==
In the 1950s (when the story is set) and the 1970s (when the episode was produced and broadcast), gay people were prohibited from serving in the United States armed forces; all recruits had to certify that they were not homosexual and had not committed homosexual acts, and could be prosecuted for fraudulent enlistment if they lied. Gay television historian Stephen Tropiano notes the continued relevance of "George" because it "expos[es] the ignorance behind the discrimination of homosexuals in the military". He highlights the fact that, unlike other gay-themed episodes from television of the era, "George" does not make its gay character the target of jokes except from the bigoted Frank Burns.
