= Radar's Report =

- M*A*S*H episode
- Episode no.: Season 2 Episode 3
- Directed by: Jackie Cooper
- Story by: Sheldon Keller
- Teleplay by: Laurence Marks
- Production code: K402
- Original air date: September 29, 1973

Guest appearances
- Joan Van Ark; Allan Arbus

Episode chronology
← Previous "5 O'Clock Charlie"	Next → "For the Good of the Outfit"
- M*A*S*H season 2

"Radar's Report" is the 27th episode of M*A*S*H, and third of season two. The episode aired on September 29, 1973.

== Overview ==
October 17, 1951: This episode is told as a voice-over of Radar reading a report as he is typing it. Comically, it includes where he puts punctuation and how he spaces the report. In each scene of the episode, the viewer hears the actual scene as well as the report that Radar is making.

An enemy prisoner who is being treated in the OR grabs a scalpel and attacks a nurse, Lt. Erika Johnson (Joan Van Ark), and inadvertently splashes foreign matter into the wound of a patient of Trapper's before being subdued by Hawkeye. When Trapper's patient subsequently dies, Trapper is furious at the enemy soldier and stands over his bed menacingly, as if he is going to sabotage his care. However, Hawkeye talks him down from acting.

Hawkeye, meanwhile, has fallen head over heels in love with Erika. Although he is temporarily deterred by seeing a wedding ring on her hand, he is happy to discover that the ring is merely a shield against unwanted advances. Hawkeye is prepared to propose to the nurse, but she is not interested in a long-term relationship and is shipped out to Tokyo. During the crucial conversation, in which she reveals to Hawkeye that they can't have the kind of relationship that he desires, the PA system plays "As Time Goes By", and Hawkeye says, "Not their song," thinking of the implicit parallel to Rick and Ilsa in Casablanca.

After Frank mistakes Klinger for Margaret, the two majors decide to get rid of Klinger. They convince Lt. Col. Blake to have Klinger undergo a psychiatric evaluation. Dr. Milton Freedman (Allan Arbus), an Army psychiatrist, interviews Klinger, and tells him that although he believes Klinger to be sane, he is willing to grant him a Section 8 discharge if he will sign a report confirming that he is a transvestite and a homosexual (a report which Freedman notes will follow him into civilian life). Insisting that he is neither ("I'm just crazy!"), Klinger refuses to sign, and Freedman files a report saying that Klinger is sane.

== Production ==
This was the first episode to feature Allan Arbus as Army psychiatrist Dr. Freedman. In this episode, he is called "Milton Freedman"; in later episodes, the character is renamed "Sidney Freedman".
