= Geoffrey Deuel =

American film and television actor (1943–2024)

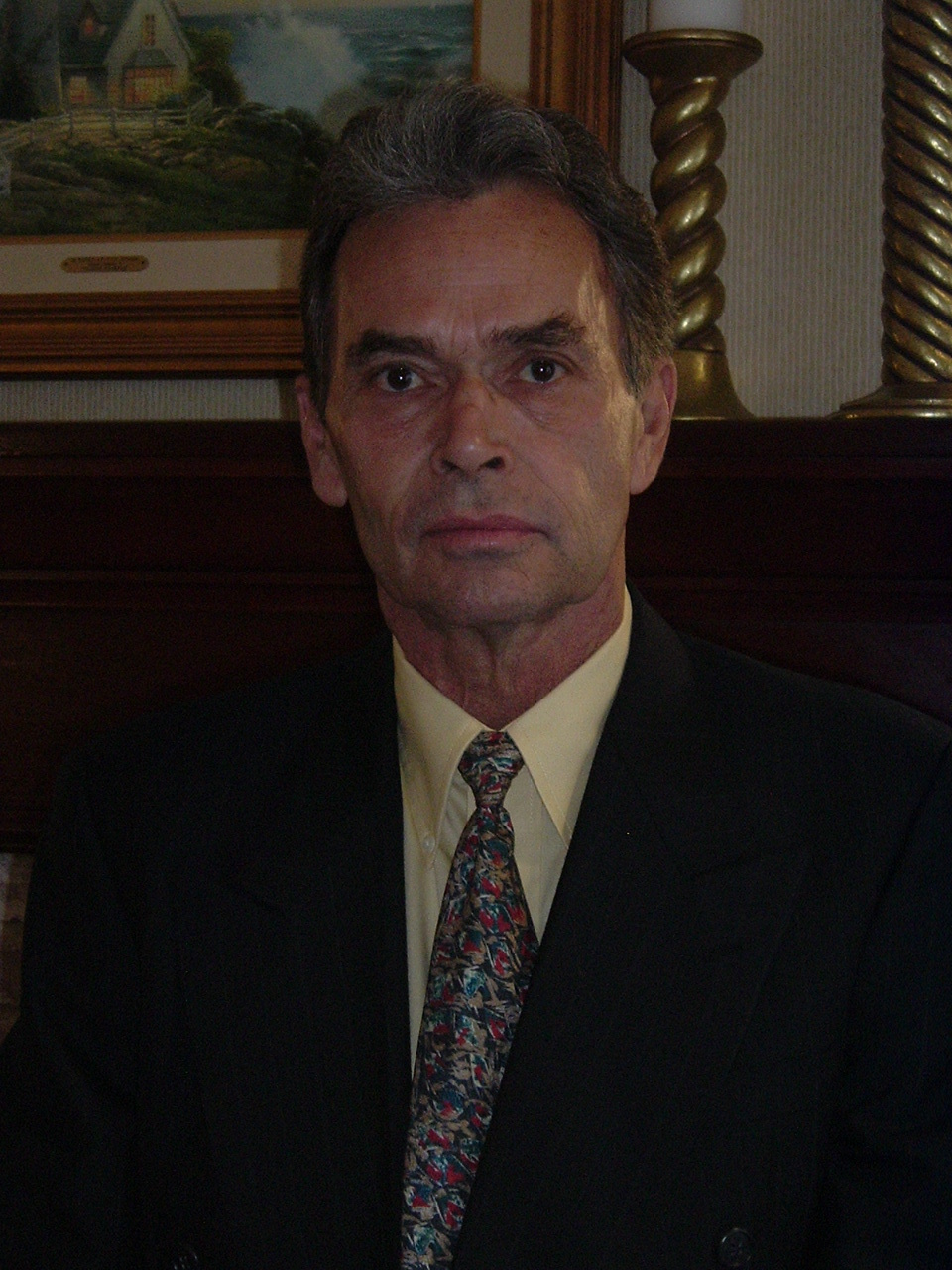
- Geoffrey Deuel, 2009
- Born: Geoffrey Jacob Deuel; January 17, 1943; Lockport, New York, U.S.
- Died: December 22, 2024 (aged 81); Largo, Florida, U.S.
- Education: University of South Florida
- Occupation: Actor
- Years active: 1963–2001
- Spouse: Jacqueline Victoria Deuel
- Relatives: Pete Duel (brother)

Geoffrey Jacob Deuel (January 17, 1943 – December 22, 2024) was an American film and television actor. He was known for playing Dave Campbell in the American soap opera television series The Young & the Restless from 1973 to 1977. He was the brother of actor Pete Duel.

== Life and career ==
Deuel was born in Lockport, New York, on January 17, 1943. He was best known for playing Billy the Kid in the film Chisum (1970).

He appeared in several movie and television productions through the years, including Barnaby Jones (episode: "The Last Contract", December 31, 1974); The Mod Squad, Ironside, and The Name of the Game, in which he acted opposite his older brother, Pete Duel (1940–1971).

Deuel died from complications of COPD in Largo, Florida, on December 22, 2024, at the age of 81.

== Filmography ==
=== Film ===
Year	Title	Role	Notes
1970	Chisum	Billy "the Kid" Bonney	
1973	Terminal Island	Chino	
1978	The Chinese Caper	Larry Crawford	
1986	Amateur Night	Charlie, Theater Manager	
2001	108 Stitches	Maynard	

=== Television ===
Year	Title	Role	Notes
1966	Twelve O'Clock High	American Pilot	Episode: "Graveyard"
1967	Occasional Wife	Gypsy Son	Episode: "Fair Play for Gypsies"
1967	The Monkees	Groom	S1:E30, "Monkees Manhattan Style"
1967	The Invaders	Teenager	Episode: "The Condemned"
1967	Bonanza	Hack	Episode: "Sense of Duty"
1968	The High Chaparral	Johnny Kelso	Episode: "The Assassins"
1968	The Flying Nun	Waiter	Episode: "May the Wind Be Always at Your Back"
1968–1973	The F.B.I.	Robert Benderson / Eric Stone / Sergeant John Abrams	4 episodes
1969	Adam-12	Paul Banner	Episode: "Log 73: I'm Still a Cop"
1969	The Mod Squad	Bill Jacobs	Episode: "A Place to Run, a Heart to Hide In"
1969–1975	Mannix	Clint Williams / Jimmy Whitewing	2 episodes
1970	House on Greenapple Road	Sammy	Television film
1970	Medical Center	Billy Sand	Episode: "The Savage Image"
1971	To Rome with Love	Gary	Episode: "Making the Scene"
1971	The Name of the Game	Zemmo	Episode: "The Savage Eye"
1971	Insight	Stefan	Episode: "The Immigrant"
1971	The Smith Family	Roy Hunter	Episode: "Man in the Middle"
1972	Movin' On	Johnny Lake	Television film
1973	Mission: Impossible	Pete Novick	Episode: "The Fighter"
1973	Cannon	Kenny Harrison	Episode: "Hounds of Hell"
1973	Toma	Donald F. Harkness / Larry Tabscot	Episode: "Ambush on 7th Avenue"
1973	The Magician	Vic Reiser	Episode: "Lightning on a Dry Day"
1973–1974	The Streets of San Francisco	Inspector Glenn Decker / Greg Bane / Peter Anthony	2 episodes
1973–1977	The Young and the Restless	Dave Campbell	
1974	Ironside	Mo Tucker	Episode: "Once More for Joey"
1974	This Is the Life	David Hamilton	Episode: "Bondslave"
1974	Marcus Welby, M.D.	Eddie Haynes	Episode: "Out of Control"
1974	Planet of the Apes	Anto	Episode: "The Good Seeds"
1974	Petrocelli	Edgar Dorsey	Episode: "A Life for a Life"
1974	Nakia	Brennan	Episode: "The Driver"
1974	The Manhunter	Walt Bellows	Episode: "A.W.O.L. to Kill"
1974	Barnaby Jones	Lester Wakefield	Episode: "The Last Contract"
1975	Joe Forrester	Clint Dancer	Episode: "Stake Out"
1988	In the Line of Duty: The F.B.I. Murders	Agent Gilbert M. Orrantia	Television film
