= W.I.A. Wounded in Action =

- Directed by: Irving Sunasky
- Written by: Irving Sunasky
- Starring: Steven Marlo, Maura McGiveney, Leopoldo Salcedo, Pete Duel
- Release date: 1966
- Language: English

W.I.A. Wounded in Action is a 1966 war film directed and written by Irving Sunasky.

== Plot ==
The story of wounded soldiers at a military hospital in the Philippines during World War II.
