= The Young Country =

1970 TV film

- Genre: Western
- Written by: Roy Huggins
- Directed by: Roy Huggins
- Starring: Walter Brennan; Joan Hackett; Wally Cox; Pete Duel; Roger Davis
- Theme music composer: Pete Rugolo
- Country of origin: United States
- Original language: English

Production
- Producers: Steve Heilpern; Roy Huggins; Carl Pingitore
- Cinematography: Vilis Lapenieks
- Editor: Robert Watts
- Running time: 74 minutes
- Production companies: Public Art Films; Universal Television

Original release
- Network: ABC
- Release: March 17, 1970

The Young Country is a 1970 American Western television film written and directed by Roy Huggins, creator of TV's Maverick. It starred Walter Brennan, Joan Hackett, Wally Cox, Pete Duel and Roger Davis. It was aired on 17 March 1970 in the ABC Movie of the Week strand. It was televised in the UK on 1 May 1970 and was shown in Japan, Spain, South Korea and the Philippines.

Made as a pilot for a potential series, The Young Country was about con artists in the Old West. TV Guide describes The Young Country as a lighthearted Western, where a footloose young gambler is searching for the owner of a mysterious fortune.

Stephen Foster Moody (Roger Davis of TV's Dark Shadows) is "a serious student" of gambling, takes a personal oath to spend the rest of his life avoiding "hard liquor and hard work" after doing hitches in both the Union and Confederate armies. Aarom Grimes (Wally Cox) is a thief who robs a bank. They and other various interested parties set about finding the said mysterious fortune.

The Young Country was rejected as a series by ABC; however, they broadcast it as an ABC Movie of the Week. Roy Huggins went on to develop the pilot for Alias Smith and Jones, which ABC accepted and was turned into a series of the same name. This series followed the adventures of two reformed outlaws, who in character were not dissimilar to those played by Pete Duel and Roger Davis in The Young Country.

== Cast ==
- Walter Brennan as Sheriff Matt Fenley
- Joan Hackett as Clementine Hale
- Wally Cox as Aaron Grimes / Ira Greebe
- Pete Duel as Honest John Smith
- Roger Davis as Stephen Foster Moody
- Skip Young as Desk clerk
- Steve Sandor as Parker
- Elliott Street as R.R. ticket clerk
- Robert Miller Driscoll as Harvey 'Fat' Chance
