= Showtime (M*A*S*H) =

- M*A*S*H episode
- Episode no.: Season 1 Episode 24
- Directed by: Jackie Cooper
- Story by: Larry Gelbart
- Teleplay by: Robert Klane; Larry Gelbart
- Production code: J324
- Original air date: March 25, 1973

Episode chronology
← Previous "Ceasefire"	Next → "Divided We Stand"
- M*A*S*H season 1

"Showtime" is the 24th and final episode of the first season of the American television series M*A*S*H. It originally aired on March 25, 1973.

== Plot ==
A USO show is held at the 4077th, featuring stand-up comic Jackie Flash (Joey Forman) and female singing trio The Miller Sisters (Marilyn King, Jean Turrell and Joan Lucksinger), augmented by backup band Charlie Keller and His Claire-de-Lunatics. The performance is juxtaposed with scenes from everyday life in the camp. Henry's wife gives birth to a son. Though Henry is depressed by not being able to see his new baby, Radar cheers him up by arranging for one of the camp's laundry workers to let him hold hers. The camp dentist receives his discharge orders and takes great pains to avoid injury and illness before he starts his trip home, only to crash his jeep and end up in traction. Frank plays a series of practical jokes on Hawkeye, sabotaging the still to spray him in the face, causing a bucket of water to fall and soak him, and rigging the showerheads to malfunction when he tries to take a shower. Hawkeye gets the last laugh by collapsing the officers' latrine tent on top of Frank while he is using it.

== Production notes ==
"Showtime" is structurally similar to "Dear Dad" and "Dear Dad...Again," in which it lacks the conventional linear structure of most television programs. It uses moments from the USO show, styled like the ones hosted by Bob Hope, to make commentary and contrast the ugliness of war with the fluff of the performances in the show.

At one point during the band's performance, Radar launches into a drum solo. This was not overdubbed, but was an actual live performance by Gary Burghoff, who had experience as a drummer. He suggested that Radar play in the episode as a means of paying homage to jazz drummer Gene Krupa, whom Burghoff greatly admired; Krupa allowed the actor to use his drum kit for the scene.

== Guest cast ==
- John Orchard – Ugly John: this episode marked the last appearance of the Ugly John character (a carryover figure from the original novel and movie); however, Orchard did appear in the 1979 episode "Captains Outrageous" as a different character.
