= Gemini Man (TV series) =

1976 American action-adventure drama series

- Genre: Action-adventure; Drama
- Based on: The Invisible Man by H. G. Wells
- Written by: Leslie Stevens; Steven E. de Souza; Frank Telford
- Directed by: Michael Caffey; Alan Crosland Jr.; Alan J. Levi
- Starring: Ben Murphy; William Sylvester; Katherine Crawford
- Opening theme: Lee Holdridge
- Composers: Lee Holdridge; Mark Snow; Billy Goldenberg
- Country of origin: United States
- Original language: English
- No. of seasons: 1
- No. of episodes: 11 (+two-hour pilot)

Production
- Executive producer: Harve Bennett
- Producer: Frank Telford
- Cinematography: Enzo A. Martinelli; Vincent A. Martinelli
- Editors: Earle Herdan; Gene Ranney; Robert F. Shugrue
- Running time: Approx. 50 minutes
- Production companies: Harve Bennett Productions; Universal Television

Original release
- Network: NBC
- Release: September 23 – October 28, 1976

Related
- Riding with Death

Partial shot from the opening sequence, showing Ben Murphy as Sam Casey and the countdown digital watch that served as his DNA stabilizer

Gemini Man is an American action-adventure drama series that aired on NBC in 1976. The third television series based on H. G. Wells' 1897 science fiction novel The Invisible Man, Gemini Man was created to replace the previous season's The Invisible Man using simpler and less expensive special effects.

== Plot ==
The series starred Ben Murphy as laid-back, denim-clad, motorcycle-riding secret agent Sam Casey, who while diving to retrieve a fallen Soviet spy satellite, was exposed to radiation in an underwater explosion, which rendered him invisible. The agency for which he worked, a high-tech government think tank called Intersect (International Security Techniques), found a way to return him to visibility and control his new power by the use of a special wristwatch referred to as a "DNA stabilizer", which was invented by scientist Abby Lawrence (Katherine Crawford). Pressing a button on the digital watch would make him vanish, clothes and all, which was a helpful tool in his line of work, but he could only do this for 15 minutes per day or else he would die.

== Reception ==
A pilot episode aired on May 10, 1976, and the series began airing on September 23 of that year. Casey's boss, Leonard Driscoll, was played by Richard Dysart in the pilot, and by William Sylvester during the series.

The show was cancelled after five episodes due to low ratings and relatively high production costs. Although 11 episodes were produced, the remaining six were not aired in the United States, although the entire series was seen in Britain with somewhat greater success that led to a record album and hardcover annual based on the show. The eleven episodes were also shown, dubbed into Afrikaans, in South Africa.

== Cast ==
- Ben Murphy as Sam Casey
- Katherine Crawford as Abby Lawrence
- William Sylvester as Leonard Driscoll
- Quinn K. Redeker as Brighton

== Episodes ==
=== Pilot ===
The pilot episode of Gemini Man was titled "Code Name: Minus One". The plot involves Sam Casey, a government agent for INTERSECT, who is caught in the explosion of a government underwater salvage operation. He finds himself capable of turning himself invisible. Genetic changes sustained in a radiation mishap enable Casey to turn invisible, but only for 15 minutes a day, but any longer and he'd be dead. He then sets out to use his new powers to prove that the explosion was sabotage. The pilot episode was directed by Alan J. Levi.

=== Television movie ===
Two episodes, "Smithereens" and "Buffalo Bill Rides Again", were re-edited into one 90-minute television film titled Riding with Death, released in 1981.

The film used scenes from Colossus: The Forbin Project as establishing shots for sweeping computer-room scenes. The "Guardian" logo ("Guardian" was the Russian version of "Colossus") appears in at least one segment. Though not immediately verifiable, at least one segment uses the "Colossus" speaker/microphone.

Production had to deal with Crawford departing the series by the latter episode, the length of time between filming (Sylvester had grown a thick, bushy mustache in the interim), and the appearance of an arch-villain in the second "half" who did not exist in the opening (covered by an overdub referring to the villain's elusiveness in the final minutes of the first segment). Both parts feature singer Jim Stafford as a trucker named Buffalo Bill, who befriends and helps Sam.

In 1997, Riding with Death was featured in an eighth-season episode of movie-mocking television show Mystery Science Theater 3000. Mike Nelson and his robot pals highlighted the thin connection between the two halves, and the general incoherence of the plot.

== Home media ==
The complete television series was released as a region 2 DVD in the French territory in November 2013 by Elephant Films with two language tracks, French and English. The episodes are uncut.
