= The Hell with Heroes =

1968 film by Joseph Sargent

- Film poster
- Directed by: Joseph Sargent
- Written by: Harold Livingston
- Produced by: Stanley Chase
- Starring: Rod Taylor; Claudia Cardinale; Harry Guardino; Kevin McCarthy; Pete Duel
- Cinematography: Bud Thackery
- Edited by: Howard Epstein
- Music by: Quincy Jones
- Color process: Technicolor
- Production company: Universal Pictures
- Distributed by: Universal Pictures
- Release date: 1968
- Running time: 102 minutes
- Country: United States
- Language: English
- Budget: $1.6 million
- Box office: 163,598 admissions (France)

The Hell with Heroes (A Time for Heroes and Run Hero Run) is a 1968 American action drama war film directed by Joseph Sargent (his first feature directorial effort) set in Africa immediately after World War II. The film stars Rod Taylor, Claudia Cardinale and Kevin McCarthy.

== Plot ==
In 1946, after fighting in World War II, two former United States Army Air Forces pilots in North Africa, Brynie MacKay and Mike Brewer are forced to work for Lee Harris, an international smuggler to get money needed for their return to civilian life. The smuggler wants them to fly to France, with Egyptian cotton cargo. When Brynie finds that their real cargo is contraband cigarettes, he extorts Harris for more money. In retaliation, Harris plants narcotics on Brynie's aircraft and informs Colonel Wilson at U. S. Counterintelligence.

With Byrnie's aircraft impounded and his money seized, Elena, Harris' mistress comes to his aid. Harris exacts a promise for 12 more illegal cargo flights, but Mike warns that they will both be killed if they go ahead with this scheme. When Mike tries to trap Harris by informing Col. Wilson about the smuggling runs, Harris, who is flying with the two pilots, kills Mike, but is knocked out by Byrnie.

Fearing Harris' gang is waiting for him at the prearranged destination, Byrnie lands his aircraft at an abandoned military air strip and informs Wilson where the contraband can be found. With Elena at his side, Byrnie then escapes to North Africa. When Harris tracks them down, Brynie overcomes Harris and turns him over to Wilson, and because of the deal Mike had made, is released. Brynie decides to return to the United States with Elena and become a teacher, his former profession.

== Cast ==
- Rod Taylor as Brynie MacKay
- Claudia Cardinale as Elena
- Harry Guardino as Lee Harris
- Kevin McCarthy as Col. Wilson
- Pete Duel as Mike Brewer
- William Marshall as Al Poland
- Don Knight as Pepper
- Michael Shillo as Pol Guilbert
- Robert Yuro as Willoughby
- Lew Brown as Sgt. Shaeffer
- Wilhelm von Homburg as Hans
- Tanya Lemani as Jamila
- Émile Genest as Insp. Bouchard
- Mae Mercer as Chanteuse
- Sid Haig as Crespin

== Production ==
Although by this stage in his film career, Rod Taylor was a reasonably big film star, the producers could get him cheaply for this film under an old multi-picture contract he'd signed with Universal in 1962. Peter Duel was starting his first film as a Universal contract player.

== Reception ==
The Hell with Heroes did not receive positive critical reviews. In his review for The Hollywood Reporter, John Mahoney wrote that the film "is a trite and unpleasant tale ... you are aware that the director is trying to punch up deficient material." In the review in the Motion Picture Herald, the commentator noted that The Hell with Heroes was "... in the tradition of old-fashioned melodrama, which is essentially what this picture basically is." FilmInk called it "cheap and bland, although the movie has its fans and Rod and Cardinale have sizzling chemistry."

== Home media ==
Kino Lorber released The Hell With Heroes on Blu-ray in January 2024 via Kino's deal with Universal; the first time the film had been issued on any home video medium. As stated on the sleeve art—the Kino Lorber disc used a new HD master from a 2k scan of the 35mm interpositive.

== See also ==
- List of American films of 1968
