= Pete Duel =

American actor (1940–1971)

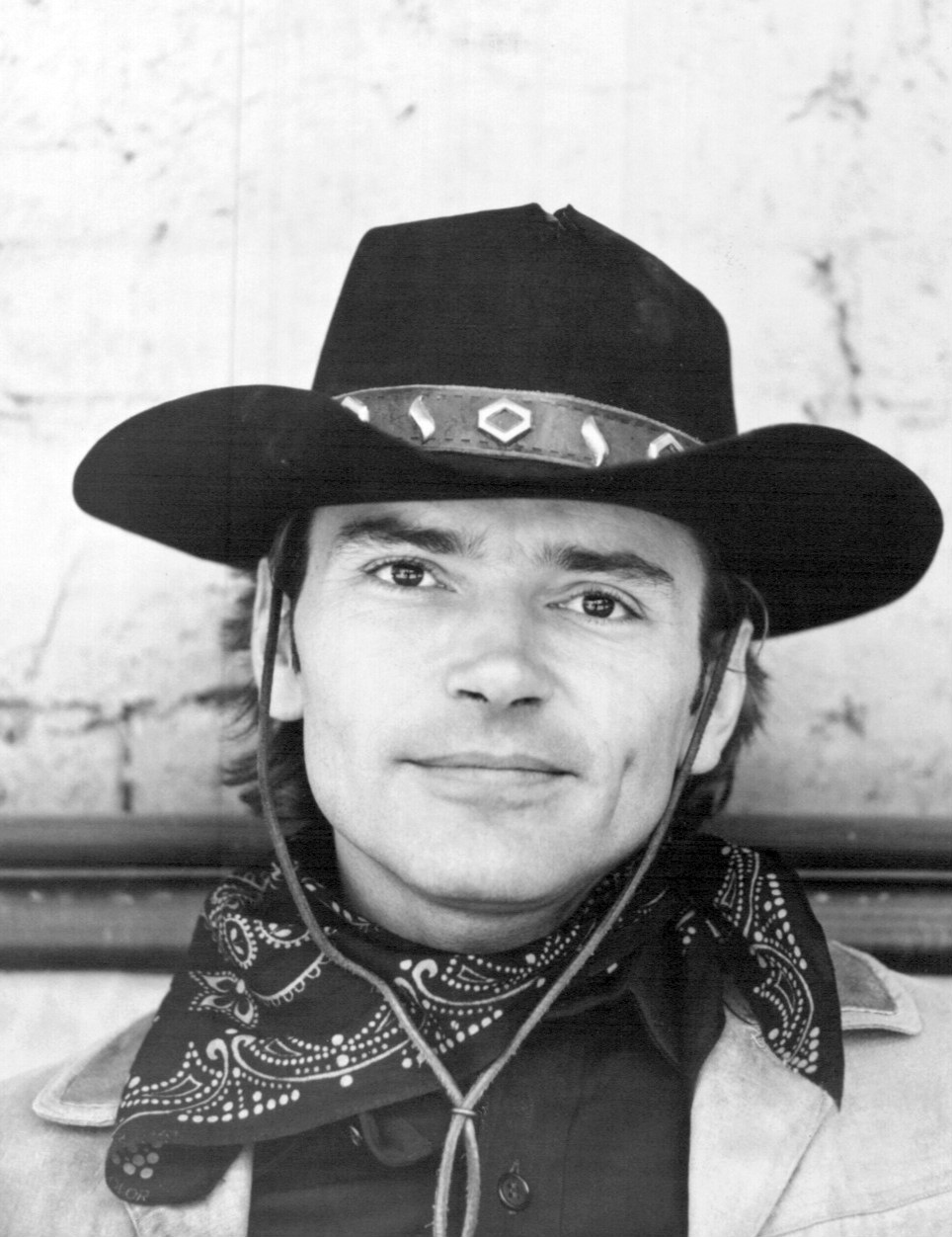
- Alias Smith and Jones, 1971
- Born: Peter Ellstrom Deuel; February 24, 1940; Rochester, New York, U.S.
- Died: December 31, 1971 (aged 31); Hollywood, Los Angeles, California, U.S.
- Resting place: Oakwood Cemetery; Penfield, New York, U.S.
- Education: St. Lawrence University
- Occupation: Actor
- Years active: 1963–1971
- Relatives: Geoffrey Deuel (brother), Pamela Duel

Peter Ellstrom Deuel (February 24, 1940 – December 31, 1971), known professionally as Pete Duel, was an American stage, television, and film actor, who starred as outlaw Hannibal Heyes (alias Joshua Smith) in the television series Alias Smith and Jones.

== Early life ==
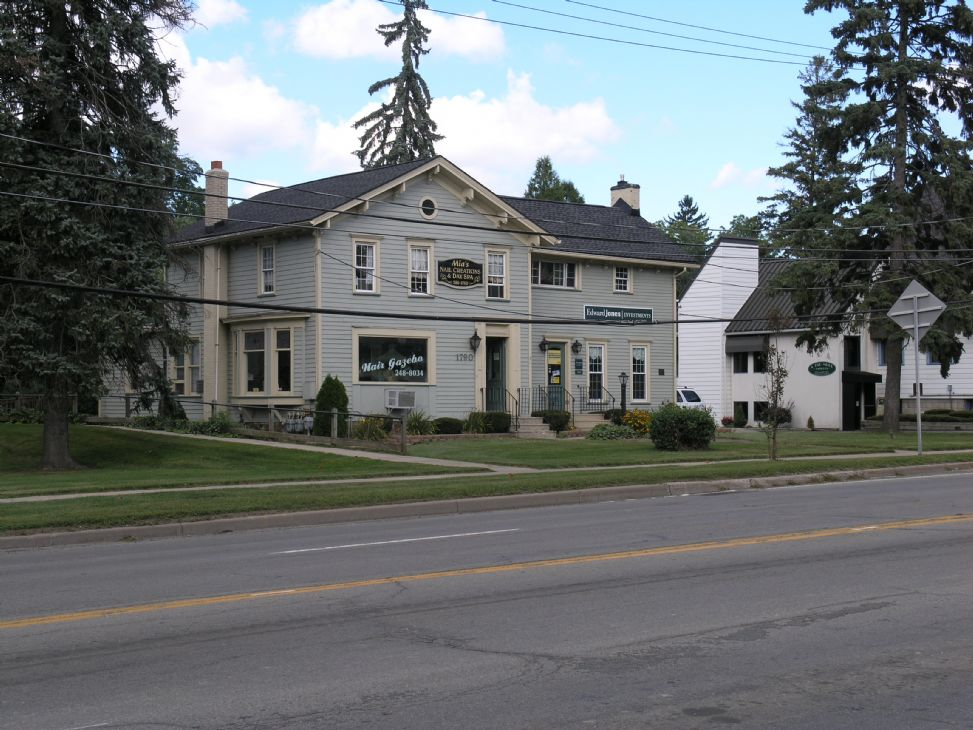
Duel's childhood home

Duel was born in Rochester, New York, the eldest of three children born to Dr. Ellsworth and Lillian Deuel (née Ellstrom). His brother Geoffrey Deuel (1943–2024) was also an actor (appearing in Chisum (1970) and episodic television appearances of the 1960s and 1970s), their sister's name was Pamela.

He attended Penfield High School, where he worked on the yearbook staff, campaigned for student government, and was a member of the National Thespians Society. He graduated in 1957 and attended St. Lawrence University in Canton, New York, where he majored in English. He was a member of Phi Sigma Kappa fraternity. He preferred performing in the drama department's productions to studying for his classes during his two years there. When his father came to see him in The Rose Tattoo, he realized that his son was only wasting time and money at the university, and told him to follow a career in acting.

Moving to New York City, Duel landed a role in a touring production of the comedy Take Her, She's Mine. To find work in the movies, Duel and his mother drove across the country to Hollywood, California, in 1963, with only a tent to house them each night.

== Career ==
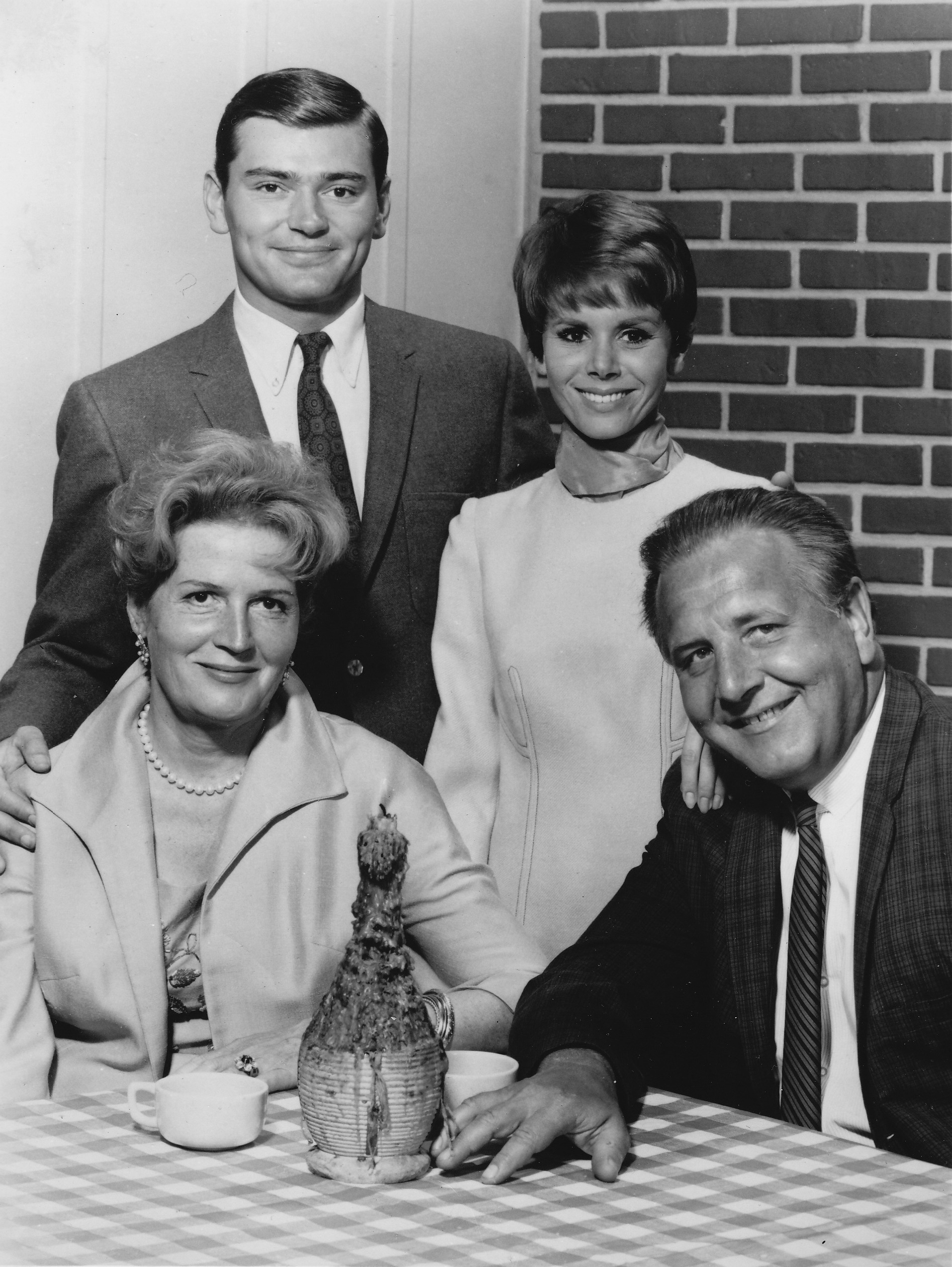
From TV's Love on a Rooftop (1966) Back row, L-R: Pete Duel, Judy Carne Front: Edith Atwater, Herbert Voland

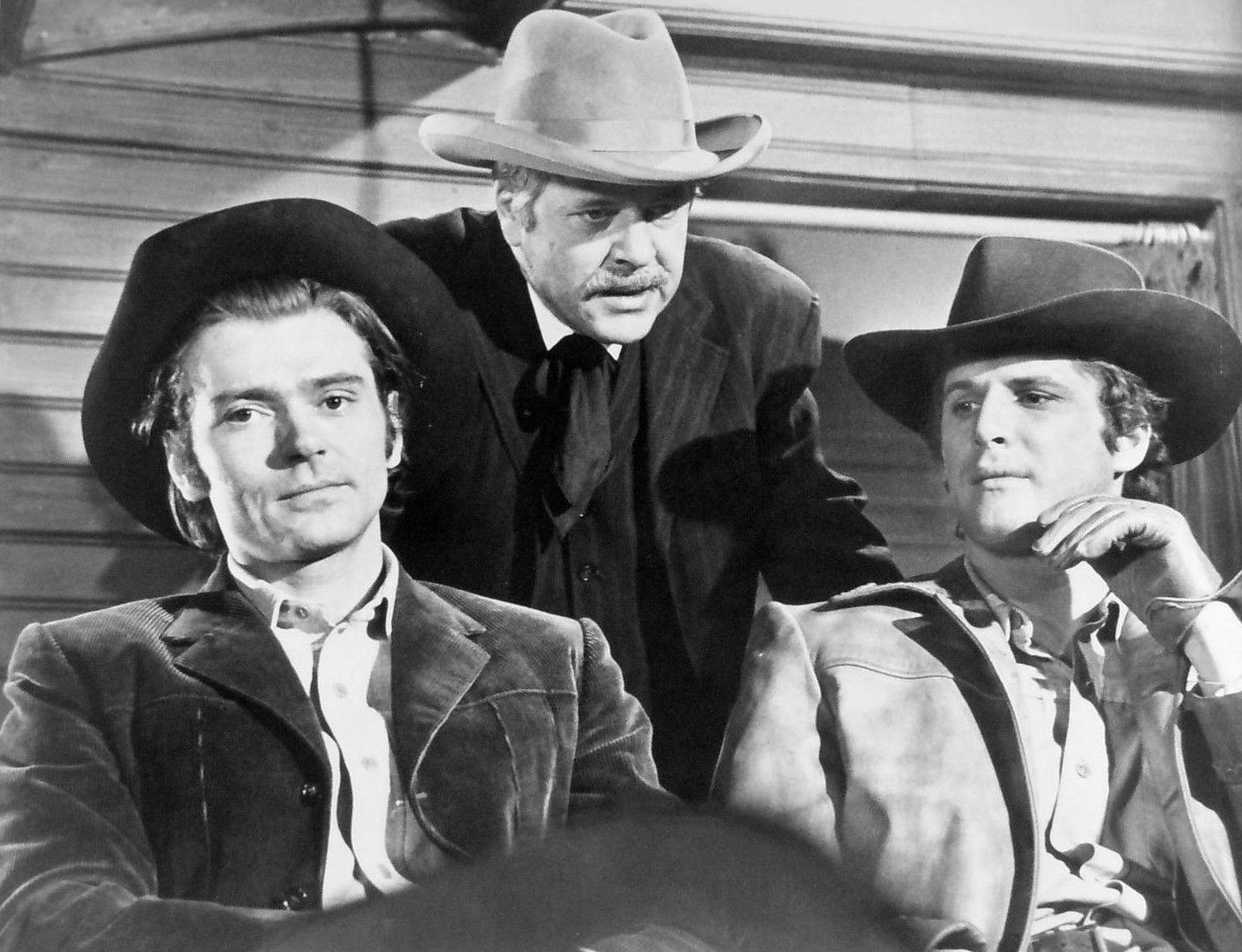
Alias Smith and Jones (1971) L-R: Duel, William Windom, Ben Murphy

In Hollywood, he found work in television, making small guest appearances in comedies such as Gomer Pyle, U.S.M.C. and dramas such as Channing, Combat!, and Bonanza. In 1965, he was cast in the comedy series Gidget as Gidget's brother-in-law, John Cooper; he appeared in 22 of the show's 32 episodes.

After Gidget's cancellation, Duel was quickly offered the starring role of Dave Willis, a newlywed apprentice architect, in the romantic comedy series Love on a Rooftop. Although the show earned good ratings, ABC decided not to bring it back after its first season. Duel wished to move from sitcoms to more serious roles. Around 1970, he changed the spelling of his last name from Deuel to Duel.

Duel appeared in The Psychiatrist, The Bold Ones, Ironside, and Marcus Welby, M.D.; he also made feature films during this time, beginning with The Hell with Heroes in 1968, playing Rod Taylor’s best friend and co-pilot, Mike Brewer, followed the next year by Generation. After that film, he went to Spain to make Cannon for Cordoba (1970), a Western in which he played the mischievous soldier Andy Rice.

In 1970, Duel was cast as the outlaw Hannibal Heyes, alias Joshua Smith, opposite Ben Murphy's Kid Curry, in Alias Smith and Jones, a light-hearted Western about the exploits of two outlaws trying to earn their amnesty. During the hiatus between the first and second seasons, he starred in the television production of Percy MacKaye’s 1908 play The Scarecrow.

According to Quentin Tarantino, Duel was one of the inspirations for the character of Rick Dalton in the film Once Upon a Time in Hollywood. In Tarantino's novelization of the movie, Duel and Dalton worked together, "enjoyed ... each other's company" and were both "undiagnosed bipolar."

== Personal life ==
Duel became involved in politics during the primaries for the 1968 presidential election, campaigning for Eugene McCarthy, in opposition to the Vietnam War. He attended the 1968 Democratic National Convention in Chicago, and witnessed the violence that erupted.

== Death ==
In the early hours of Friday, New Years Eve 1971, Duel died at his Hollywood Hills home of a self-inflicted gunshot wound to the head.

Duel's girlfriend Dianne Ray was at his home at the time of his death and discovered his body. Ray later told police the couple had watched Duel's series Alias Smith and Jones the previous evening. She later went to sleep in another room while Duel stayed up. Sometime after midnight, Duel entered the bedroom, retrieved his revolver and told Ray "I'll see you later." Ray then said she heard a gunshot from another room and discovered Duel's body.

According to police, Duel's friends and family said he was depressed about his drinking problem. He had been arrested and pleaded guilty to a drunk driving crash that injured two people the previous June. Duel's death was later ruled a suicide.

Duel's funeral was held at the Self-Realization Fellowship Temple on January 2, 1972, in Pacific Palisades. At the service, Ray read a poem he wrote, titled "Love". An estimated 1,000 friends and fans attended. His body was flown to Penfield, New York, where he was buried in Oakwood Cemetery.

After his death, his role in Alias Smith and Jones was taken over by Roger Davis, who was previously the narrator over the opening theme of the show. The loss of Duel proved too great for the series to sustain and it was canceled in early 1973.

== Filmography ==
Film
Year	Title	Role	Notes
1963	Espionage Target - You!		Training film
1966	W.I.A. Wounded in Action	Pvt. Myers	
1968	The Hell with Heroes	Mike Brewer	
1969	Generation	Walter Owen	Alternative titles: A Time for Caring; A Time for Giving
1970	Cannon for Cordoba	Andy Rice	Alternative title: Dragon Master

Television
Year	Title	Role	Notes
1963	Channing		Episode: "The Last Testament of Buddy Crown"
1964	Combat!	Szigeti	Episode: "Vendetta"
1964	Gomer Pyle, U.S.M.C.	1st Man	Episode: "Gomer and the Dragon Lady"
1964	Mickey	Crazy Hips McNish	Episode: "One More Kiss"
1964–1965	Twelve O'Clock High	Various roles	2 episodes
1965	The Fugitive	Buzzy	Episode: "Fun and Games and Party Favors"
1965	Diamond Jim: Skulduggery in Samantha	Wild Youth	Television movie
1965–1966	Gidget	John Cooper	22 episodes
1965–1967	The F.B.I.	Various roles	2 episodes
1966–1967	Love on a Rooftop	David Willis	30 episodes
1968	Ironside	Jonathan Dix	Episode: "Perfect Crime"
1968–1969	The Virginian	Various roles	2 episodes
1968–1971	The Name of the Game	Various roles	2 episodes
1969–1971	Marcus Welby, M.D.	Various roles	2 episodes
1970	The Young Country	Honest John Smith	Television movie
1970	Insight	Edward	Episode: "A Woman of Principle"
1970	Matt Lincoln	Father Nicholas Burrell	Episode: "Nick"
1970	The Interns	Fred Chalmers	Episode: "The Price of Life"
1970	The Young Lawyers	Dom Acosta	Episode: "The Glass Prison"
1970	The Bold Ones: The Lawyers	Jerry Purdue	Episode: "Trial of a Pfc"
1970	The Psychiatrist: God Bless the Children	Casey T. Poe	Television movie
1970–1971	The Psychiatrist	Casey Poe	2 episodes
1971	How to Steal an Airplane	Sam Rollins	Television movie
1971–1972	Alias Smith and Jones	Hannibal Heyes/Joshua Smith	33 episodes
1972	The Scarecrow	Richard Talbot	Television movie

== Notes ==
=== Sources ===
- Green, Paul (May 17, 2007). Pete Duel: A Biography. McFarland. ISBN 978-0-7864-3062-8.
- Sagala, Sandra K.; Bagwell, JoAnne M. (2005). Alias Smith & Jones: The Story of Two Pretty Good Bad Men. Albany, Georgia: BearManor Media. ISBN 978-1-5939-3031-8.
