= Alias Smith and Jones =

American Western television series (1971–1973)

- Alias Smith and Jones title card
- Genre: Western
- Created by: Glen A. Larson
- Starring: Pete Duel; Ben Murphy; Roger Davis
- Narrated by: Roger Davis; Ralph Story
- Theme music composer: Billy Goldenberg
- Composers: Billy Goldenberg; Robert Prince; Pete Rugolo; John Andrew Tartaglia
- Country of origin: United States
- Original language: English
- No. of seasons: 3
- No. of episodes: 50 (list of episodes)

Production
- Executive producer: Roy Huggins
- Producers: Glen A. Larson; Jo Swerling Jr.
- Cinematography: William Cronjager; Gene Polito; John M. Stephens
- Camera setup: Single-camera
- Running time: 45–48 minutes
- Production companies: Universal Television; Universal/Public Arts Production

Original release
- Network: ABC
- Release: January 5, 1971 – January 13, 1973

Related
- The Young Country

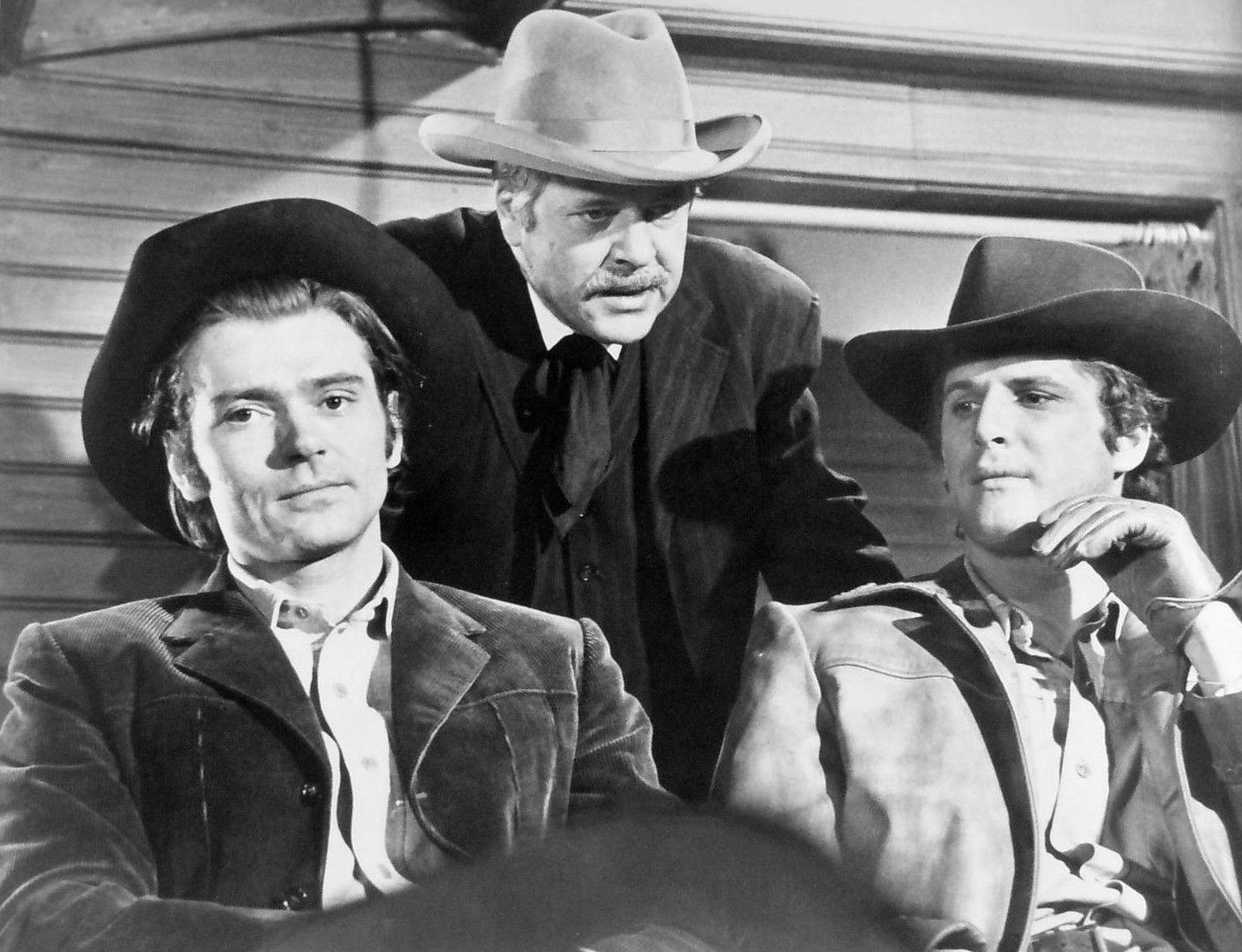
Left to right: Pete Duel, William Windom and Ben Murphy in Alias Smith and Jones (1971)

Alias Smith and Jones is an American Western television series that originally aired on ABC from January 1971 to January 1973.

== Plot ==
In the pilot episode, Kid Curry and Hannibal Heyes, maternal cousins, are members of an outlaw gang. The gang stops a train and tries to steal the 50,000 dollars it contains. While they are waiting for their bundle of dynamite to blow up the safe, a "little old lady from Boston" gives Curry a paper emblazoned with the words "Amnesty Offer." After their attempt to blow up the safe fails, they try to throw it off a cliff, twice in the hopes that it will break apart but both attempts fail. The gang gives up, with Curry and Heyes going their separate ways. Curry shows the amnesty paper to Heyes. They decide they don't have a chance at amnesty. However once a posse shows up Curry says to Heyes: "there's one thing we gotta get - out of this business." After that they decide to "go straight" and ask for amnesty.

Through a friendly sheriff, the pair negotiate an amnesty with the governor of Wyoming. The amnesty will be turned in a full pardon as long as the pair stay out of trouble for 12 months. The deal is complicated by it remaining a secret between the four men, so during the 12 months the pair are still wanted men. To try to obtain the pardon they adopt the pseudonyms Joshua Smith (Heyes) and Thaddeus Jones (Curry). The series follows their exploits in evading capture and avoiding any crimes.

== Cast and characters ==
=== Smith and Jones ===
Hannibal Heyes and Jeddediah "Kid" Curry are maternal cousins. In the episode 2x09, "The Reformation of Harry Briscoe" they tell a nun that they were orphaned as boys during "Bleeding Kansas" and sent to "the home" - the Valparaiso School for Waywards. They ran away from the home when they were fifteen years old. After several years as outlaws, they decided to try for amnesty and adopted the pseudonyms "Joshuah Smith" and "Thaddeus Jones."

=== Death of Pete Duel ===
The original casting had Pete Duel as Heyes/Smith and Ben Murphy as Curry/Jones. During the three seasons Murphy appeared in all 50 episodes.

In the early morning hours of December 31, 1971, series star Pete Duel died of a self-inflicted gunshot wound at the age of 31. He was reportedly suffering from depression and had been drinking heavily when he shot himself. Upon learning of Duel's death, executive producer Jo Swerling Jr. initially wanted to end the series, but ABC refused. Swerling later stated:

ABC said, "No way!" They said, "You have a contract to deliver this show to us, and you will continue to deliver the show as best you can on schedule or we will sue you." Hearing those words, Universal didn't hesitate for a second to instruct us to stay in production. We were already a little bit behind the eight ball on airdates. So, we contacted everybody, including Ben (Murphy), and told them to come back in. The entire company was reassembled and back in production by one o'clock that day shooting scenes that did not involve Peter — only 12 hours after his death.

Series writer, director, and producer Roy Huggins contacted actor Roger Davis (who provided narration for the series, and who had also appeared in episode 19 "Smiler with a Gun") the day of Duel's death to fill the role of Hannibal Heyes, and actor/voice man Paul Frees came in to loop Duel's unfinished ADR on "The Men That Corrupted Hadleyburg" (episode 33) Davis was fitted for costumes the following day, and began reshooting scenes Duel had previously completed for an unfinished episode the following Monday. According to Swerling, the decision to continue production so soon after Duel's death was heavily criticized in the press at the time.

Davis played Heyes for the rest of the series.

== Production ==
The series developed from The Young Country, a 1970 ABC television film produced, written, and directed by Roy Huggins as a potential series pilot. The film starred Walter Brennan and Joan Hackett, with Roger Davis and Pete Duel appearing in roles similar to the character of Hannibal Heyes. Huggins later served as executive producer and writer on the related concept, which producer Glen A. Larson reworked as Alias Smith and Jones. The reconceived series premiered on January 5, 1971, as a 90-minute midseason replacement special.

The series' premise and pairing of its lead characters prompted comparisons to the 1969 film Butch Cassidy and the Sundance Kid. Larson described the program as being in the same genre as the film and called it a "new wave western". The original cast featured Duel as Heyes, Ben Murphy as Kid Curry, and Davis as the opening narrator. Murphy, a Universal contract player, was offered to the producers because he was considered a Paul Newman lookalike.

Sally Field later played Clementine Hale, a character Hackett had originated in The Young Country. Parts of the television series were filmed at Castle Valley and Professor Valley in Utah.

== Episodes ==
Season	Episodes	Originally released	
Season	Episodes	First released	Last released
1	15	January 5, 1971	April 22, 1971
2	23	September 16, 1971	March 2, 1972
3	12	September 16, 1972	January 13, 1973

== Home media ==
The entire series has been released on DVD.

DVD set The latest release was The Complete Series in 2015 from Fabulous Films which generally offers cleaner transfers and better compression across its discs compared to older US Timeless Media releases	Episodes	Release date	Company
Alias Smith and Jones: Season 1	15	February 20, 2007	Universal Home Video
Alias Smith and Jones: Seasons 2 & 3	35	April 13, 2010	Timeless Media Group
Alias Smith and Jones: The Complete Series	50	October 19, 2010	Timeless Media Group

Universal Studios Home Entertainment released the complete first season of Alias Smith and Jones in Region 2 on June 11, 2007.
