= Ben Murphy =

American actor (born 1942)

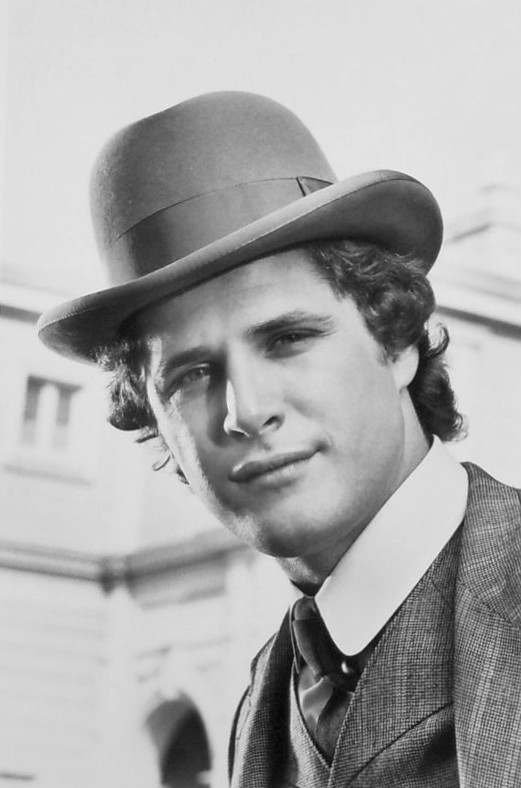
- Murphy in Alias Smith and Jones
- Born: March 6, 1942 (age 84); Jonesboro, Arkansas, U.S.
- Occupation: Actor
- Years active: 1967–2010
- Spouse: Jeanne Davis (1978–81)

Ben Murphy (born March 6, 1942) is an American actor. He is best known for his role as Kid Curry in the ABC television series Alias Smith and Jones.

== Early life ==
Murphy was born in Jonesboro, Arkansas, to Benjamin R. Castleberry and Nadine (née Steele). His mother remarried in 1949 to Patrick Henry Murphy. Ben was raised Catholic in the Chicago suburb of Clarendon Hills, Illinois. An alumnus of St. Procopius Academy in Lisle, Illinois, predecessor to today's Benet Academy, he attended eight colleges before deciding to pursue acting.

== Personal life ==
Murphy was married to Jeanne Davis from 1978-1981. The union was childless.

Murphy has a son, Joshua Spriestersbach (born 1971), from his relationship with Suzanne Bardin.

== Career ==
Murphy appeared in a supporting role in The Name of the Game, a series featuring a rotating leading cast including Tony Franciosa, Gene Barry, and Robert Stack. Murphy played a semi regular role as 'Joseph Sample' assistant to Robert Stack's leading character 'Dan Farrell' in Stack's segments of the show. From 1971–73, he starred in Alias Smith and Jones with Pete Duel (1971–72) and Roger Davis (1972–73). After Alias Smith and Jones, Murphy joined Lorne Greene in the 1973 ABC crime drama Griff.

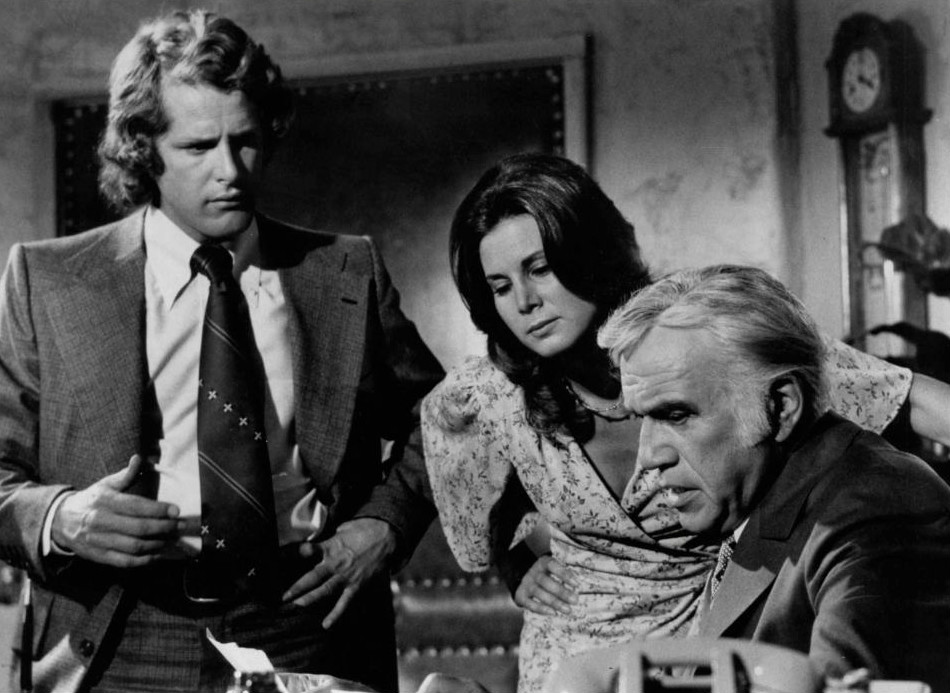
Murphy, Patricia Stich and Lorne Greene in Griff

In the 1983–84 season, Murphy co-starred with Marshall Colt in the ABC drama series Lottery! Murphy played Patrick Sean Flaherty, the man who informed lottery winners of their stroke of fortune, and Colt, formerly with James Arness on NBC's short-lived crime drama McClain's Law, portrayed the Internal Revenue Service agent, Eric Rush, who made sure the winners pay the U.S. government up front.

In 1985, Murphy co-starred as department store heir, Paul Berrenger, on the short-lived drama, Berrenger's. His character was at odds with his former wife, Gloria (Andrea Marcovicci) and his own father, Simon (Sam Wanamaker) due to his romance with executive, Shane Bradley (Yvette Mimieux). Murphy starred in his own series Gemini Man, in which he played a secret agent who could become invisible for 15 minutes a day through the use of a special wristwatch. The show did not run beyond a single season. Murphy has since appeared in guest-starring parts, including a murder suspect in Cold Case as well as a murder victim in an episode of Murder, She Wrote (opposite Ann Blyth and Stacey Nelkin).

After becoming a highly ranked tournament tennis player in California in the 1980s, Murphy competed on the USTA singles and doubles circuit and in celebrity events.

== Filmography ==
Year	Film	Role	Notes
1967	The Graduate	Shaving Student	Uncredited
1968	The Virginian	Mike Bradbury	2 episodes
1968	It Takes a Thief	King Pineau	Episode: "A Matter of Royal Larceny"
1968	Yours, Mine, and Ours	Larry	
1968	The Outsider	Patrick Forrester	Episode: "Tell It Like It Is... and You're Dead"
1968–71	The Name of the Game	Joseph Sample	6 episodes
1969	The Thousand Plane Raid	Lt. Archer	
1969	Anatomy of a Crime	Patrick Forrester	TV film
1970	Medical Center	Jerry Lambert	Episode: "His Brother's Keeper"
1970	The Mod Squad	Bob	Episode: "A Far Away Place So Near"
1971–73	Alias Smith and Jones	Jed 'Kid' Curry (Thaddeus Jones)	50 episodes
1973	The Letters	Joe Randolph	TV film
1973	Runaway!	Les Reever	TV film
1973	Love, American Style	Bart	Segment: "Love and the Postal Meeter"
1973–74	Griff	Mike Murdoch	12 Episodes
1974	Heatwave!	Frank Taylor	
1974	This Is the West That Was	Wild Bill Hickok	
1975	Sidecar Racers	Jeff Rayburn	
1975	Marcus Welby, M.D.	Alan Peterson (1	Episode: "Four Plus Hot"
1976	Code Name-Minus One	Sam Casey	TV film
1976	Gemini Man	Sam Casey	11 episodes
1976	Bridger	Kit Carson	
1979	$weepstake$		Episode: "Cowboy, Linda and Angie, Mark"
1979, 1983	Fantasy Island	Billy Blake	2 episodes - 1979 and 1983
1979–80	The Chisholms	Will Chisholm	13 episodes
1979–84	The Love Boat	Gregory King/Paul in S2 E18	5 episodes
1980	Secret War of Jackie's Girls	Buck	TV film
1981	Riding with Death	Sam Casey	TV film
1982	Trapper John, M.D.	Ned Travers	Episode: "Medicine Man"
1982	Time Walker	Prof. Douglas McCadden	
1983	Uncommon Valor	Jim Merritt	TV film
1983	The Winds of War	Warren Henry	7 episodes
1983	Matt Houston	Terry Noble	Episode: "The Beverly Hills Social Club"
1983	The Cradle Will Fall	Dr. Richard Carroll	
1983–84	Lottery!	Patrick Sean Flaherty	17 episodes
1984	Finder of Lost Loves	David Carson	Episode: "Losing Touch"
1984	Hotel	Robbie Joe Carson	Episode: "Fantasies"
1985	Berrenger's	Paul Berrenger	11 episodes
1985	Gidget's Summer Reunion	Ron Levering	TV film
1985	Scarecrow and Mrs. King	Alan Chamberlin	Episode: "A Lovely Little Affair"
1985	Murder, She Wrote	Scott Lodge	Episode: "Reflections of the Mind"
1986	Stark: Mirror Image	Steve Graves	TV film
1988	Dirty Dozen: The Series (FOX)	Major Danko	6 episodes
1989	The Twilight Zone	Jack Haines	Episode: "Love Is Blind"
1990	Shades of L.A.	Chuck Yellin	Episode: "Shades of L.A."
1991	Life Goes On	Jordan Parnell	Episode: "Proms and Prams"
1991	In the Heat of the Night	Tom Dalton	Episode: "The More Things Change"
1992	FBI: The Untold Stories	Agt. Jack Simpson	Episode: "Colonel Penn"
1993–95	Dr. Quinn, Medicine Woman	Ethan Cooper	3 episodes
1995	High Sierra Search and Rescue	Roger Harmon	Episode: "Past, Present"
1996	Silk Stalkings	Senator Grant Hemmings	Episode: "Family Values"
1996	Baywatch Nights	Robert Houston	Episode: "Epilogue"
1997–2004	JAG	Lt. Col. John Farrow; Captain Neilsen	3 episodes Episode: "Ghosts of Christmas Past"
1998	Air America	Cornelius Stratton	Episode: "Hostage Situation"
1999	E! Mysteries and Scandals	Himself	Episode: "Peter Duel"
1999	Pacific Blue	Chief Frank Swerdlow	Episode: "Swimming in the Dead Pool"
1999	Seven Days	Col. Seth Mattinger	Episode: "HAARP Attack"
2000	Hanging Up	Richard	(scenes deleted)
2001	To Protect and Serve	Officer Friendly	
2001	The District	Congressman Phillip Hallett	Episode: "Lost and Found"
2003	The Drew Carey Show	Reverend Henderson	Episode: "Two Girls for Every Boy"
2003	Navy NCIS	Capt. Veitch	Episode: "Sub Rosa"
2004	Judging Amy	Brad Vickers	Episode: "My Little Runaway"
2005	Freezerburn	General Dwight Rourke	
2006	Cold Case	Travis Whitman - 2006	Episode: "Debut"
2006	The Uniform Motion of Folly	Vincent	
2007	McBride Semper Fi	General Dwight Rourke	TV film
2010	The Genesis Code	Professor Campbell	
