= Herb Voland =

American actor (1918–81)

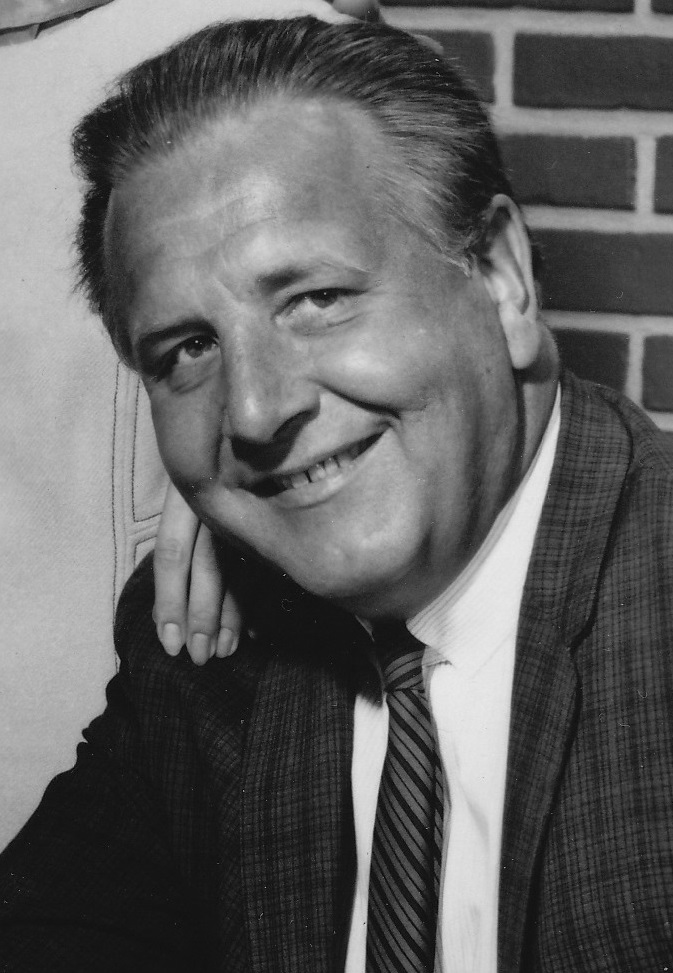
- Voland in 1966
- Born: Herbert Maurice Voland; October 2, 1918; New Rochelle, New York, U.S.
- Died: April 26, 1981 (aged 62); Riverside, California, U.S.
- Other name: Herbert Voland
- Occupation: Actor
- Years active: 1952–1981

Herbert Maurice Voland (October 2, 1918 – April 26, 1981) was an American actor, best known for his various roles on the sitcom Bewitched, as General Crandell Clayton on the sitcom M*A*S*H during seasons one and two, and the film Airplane! (1980).

== Career ==
Voland was born in New Rochelle, New York and attended Columbia University. After graduating, he studied at the American Theatre Wing before beginning his professional acting career on the Broadway stage, where his credits include Farewell, Farewell Eugene (1960) and Someone Waiting (1955).

After World War II, he began appearing on television during the medium's Golden Age and was a regular on such series as Omnibus, The Philco Television Playhouse and Studio One.

Later, he became known for his prolific portrayal of characters on 1960s and 1970s television that were most commonly gruff executives, huff-and-puff military officers, or policemen, either in light sitcoms or crime dramas.

As a member of the cast of television programs, he played Neil Ogilvie on Arnie, Fred Hammond on Love on a Rooftop, Brigadier General Crandell Clayton on M*A*S*H, Harry Masterson on Mr. Deeds Goes to Town, and Dr. Butler on The Mothers-in-Law. He also played Osborne, a con artist, on Sanford and Son.

== Personal life ==
Voland was the father of the television actor Mark Voland.

== Death ==
Voland died of a stroke on April 26, 1981, in Riverside, California.

== Filmography ==
1952

- The Hunter (TV series) – "Rendezvous in Prague" – Voralov

1957

- Studio One in Hollywood (TV series) – "A Matter of Guilt" – Bauer

1960

- The Robert Herridge Theater (TV series) – "The Lottery" – Mr. Adams
- The Iceman Cometh (TV movie) – Moran
- Play of the Week (TV series) – "The Iceman Cometh: Parts 1 & 2" – Moran

1961

- Naked City (TV series) – "Sweet Prince of Delancey Street" – Charlie Bates
- Route 66 (TV series) – "Incident on a Bridge" – Hodges
- Great Ghost Tales (TV series) – "August Heat"

1962

- Route 66 (TV series) – "Two on the House" – Bill Garrison

1964

- The Defenders (TV series) – "Blacklist" – Lloyd Hickman
- East Side/West Side (TV series) – "The Givers" – Gabe Connors
- Mr. Broadway (TV series) – "Bad Little Rich Girl" – Walter Hart

1965

- The Virginian (TV series) – "Farewell to Honesty" -Judge Charles Dodge
- Perry Mason (TV series) – "The Case of the Duplicate Case" – Ernest Hill
- Profiles in Courage (TV series) – George Mason Peckham
- I Dream of Jeannie (TV series) – "Whatever Became of Baby Custer?" – Major Jamison
- The Wackiest Ship in the Army (TV series) – "...and Tyler Too"
- The F.B.I. (TV series) – "Pound of Flesh" – Charles Buford

1966

- The Chase - Dental Delegate (uncredited)
- Love on a Rooftop (TV series) 1966-1967 – 15 episodes – Fred Hammond
- Voyage to the Bottom of the Sea (TV series) – "The Death Ship" – Carter
- Scalplock (TV movie) – Buckeye Sullivan
- Gidget (TV series) – "I Have This Friend Who" – Mel
- The Iron Horse (TV series) – "Joy Unconfined" – Buckeye

1967

- Judd for the Defense (TV series) – "The Deep End" – Judge Balfour
- Mannix (TV series) – "Beyond the Shadow of a Dream" – Frank Terrano
- The Second Hundred Years (TV series) – "The Abominable Iceman" – Mr. L
- Bewitched (TV series) (1967–1972) – 6 episodes – Judge, Mr. Ferber, E.J. Haskell, Mr. Traynor, Mr. Hascomb

1968

- He & She (TV series) – "Goodman, Spare That Tree" – Goodman
- The Mothers-In-Law (TV series) 3 episodes (1968–1969) – Dr. Butler
- Hallmark Hall of Fame (TV series) – "Elizabeth the Queen" – Captain Armin
- Don't Just Stand There! – Moffat
- The Shakiest Gun in the West – Dr. Friedlander
- With Six You Get Eggroll – Harry Scott
- Bonanza (TV series) – "Different Pines, Same Wind" – Jason Milburn
- Petticoat Junction (TV series) – "Birthplace of a Future President" – Mr. Andrews
- The Good Guys (TV series) – "Episode #1.2" – Peckinpaw

1969

- The Ghost & Mrs. Muir (TV series) – "Strictly Relative" – Ralph Muir
- The Outsider (TV series) – "Handle with Care" – Hollis
- The Love God? – Atty. Gen. Frederick Snow
- Mr. Deeds Goes to Town (TV series) – Henry Masterson
- In Name Only (TV movie) – Sergeant Mulligan

1970

- Green Acres (TV series) – "Bundle of Joy" – Judd Carling
- Love, American Style (TV series) Mr. Dunlap & Phil
- The Name of the Game (TV series) – "The Other Kind of Spy" – Harvy
- Get Smart (TV series) – "Do I Hear a Vaults?" – C. Barton Neff
- Arnie (TV series) (1970–1972) – 15 Episodes – Neil Ogilvie

1972

- M*A*S*H (TV series) (1972–1973) – 7 episodes – Brig. Gen. Crandell Clayton
- Another Nice Mess – Spiro Agnew
- The Paul Lynde Show (TV series) – 2 episodes – T.J. McNish

1973

- Sanford and Son (TV series) – "Pot Luck" – Mr. Osborne
- McCloud (TV series) – "Butch Cassidy Rides Again" – Mr. Winston

1974

- Happy Days (TV series) – "Guess Who's Coming to Visit" – Police Sergeant
- Death Sentence (TV movie) Lowell Hayes
- Emergency! (TV series) – "Surprise" – Harry
- The Manhandlers – Pruitt

1975

- Doc (TV series) – "Dog vs. Doc" – Judge
- All in the Family (TV series) – "Birth of the Baby: Part 1" – Ed Bradley

1976

- Harry O (TV series) – "Forbidden City" – Sgt. Grady
- The New Adventures of Wonder Woman (TV series) – "Wonder Woman vs. Gargantua" – Dr. Osmond

1977

- Prime Time a.k.a. American Raspberry – Admiral Taft
- The Death of Richie (TV movie) – Morris Polk
- Starsky and Hutch (TV series) – "The Psychic" – Joe Haymes
- Tail Gunner Joe (TV movie) – Sen. Raymond Baldwin
- The Hardy Boys/Nancy Drew Mysteries (TV series) – Chief Collig
- The San Pedro Beach Bums (TV series) – "A Bum Thanksgiving" – Covington
- The Jeffersons (TV series) – "The Costume Party" – Mr. Fletcher
- C.P.O. Sharkey (TV series) – "Natalie's Ultimatum" – Clerk

1978

- The Love Boat (TV series) – 3 episodes – Herb Lawrence, Sheila's Father
- Big Wednesday – minor role

1979

- The North Avenue Irregulars – Dr. Fulton
- Trapper John, M.D. (TV series) – Barton

1980

- Airplane! – Air Controller Macias
- Below the Belt
- The Formula – Geologist #3
- Getting Wasted – Principal McLaughlin

1981

- The Munsters' Revenge (TV movie) – Police Chief Harry Boyle
- Flo (TV series) – "The Daynce" (final appearance)
