= List of M*A*S*H characters =

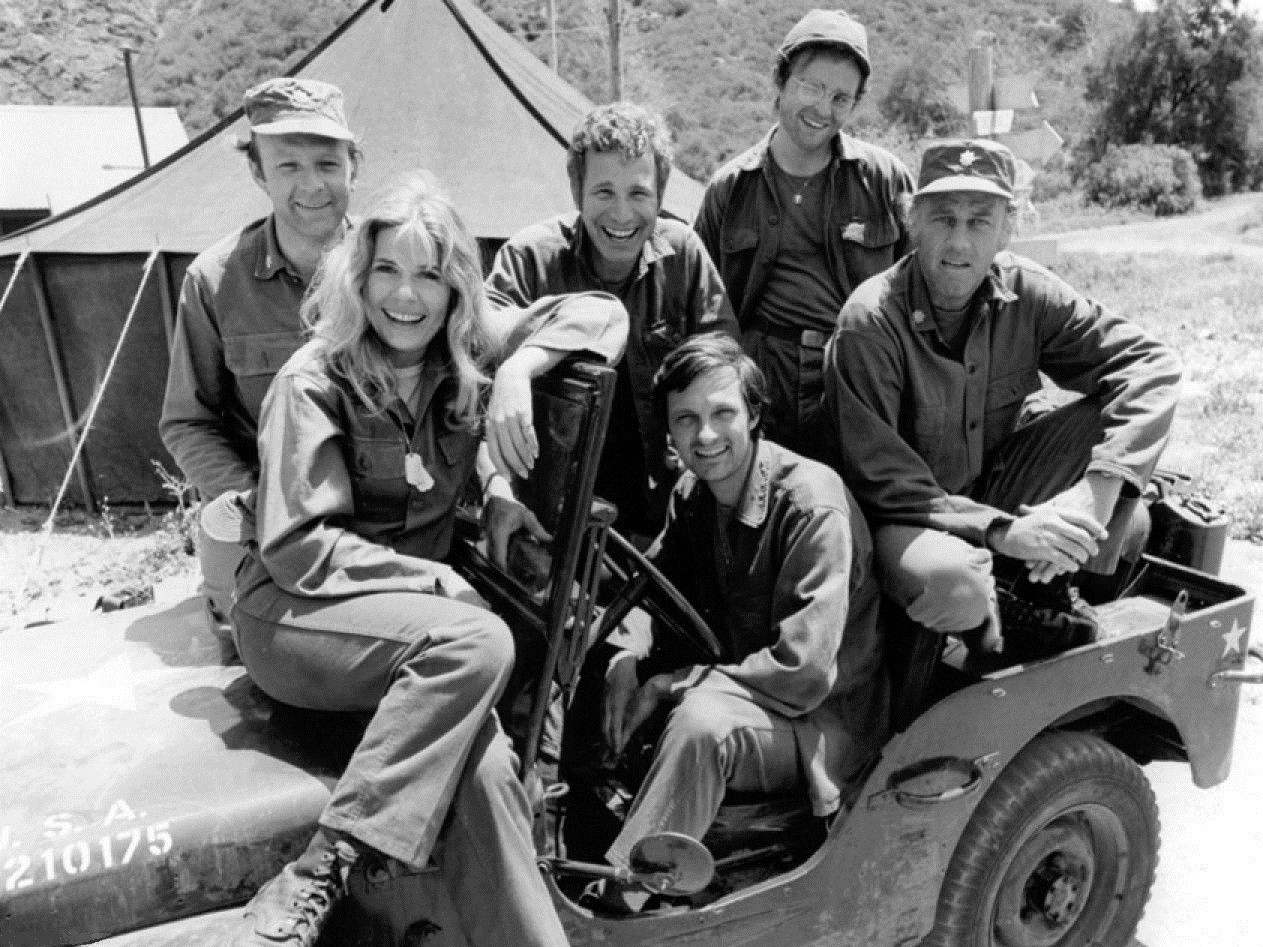
M*A*S*H television series cast members c. 1974. Back row: Larry Linville, Wayne Rogers, and Gary Burghoff. Front row: Loretta Swit, Alan Alda, and McLean Stevenson

This is a list of characters from the M*A*S*H franchise created by Richard Hooker, covering the various fictional characters appearing in the novel MASH: A Novel About Three Army Doctors (1968) and its sequels M*A*S*H Goes to Maine (1971) and M*A*S*H Mania (1977), the 1970 film adaptation of the novel, the television series M*A*S*H (1972–1983), AfterMASH (1983–1985), W*A*L*T*E*R (1984), and Trapper John, M.D. (1979–1986), and the video game M*A*S*H (1983).

M*A*S*H is a media franchise revolving around the staff of the 4077th Mobile Army Surgical Hospital as they attempt to maintain sanity during the harshness of the Korean War.

== Overview ==
Character	Film actor	TV actor	M*A*S*H											AfterMASH		W*A*L*T*E*R	Trapper John, M.D.
Character	Film actor	TV actor	1	2	3	4	5	6	7	8	9	10	11	1	2	W*A*L*T*E*R	Trapper John, M.D.
Capt. Benjamin Franklin "Hawkeye" Pierce	Donald Sutherland	Alan Alda	Starring	Starring	Starring	Starring	Starring	Starring	Starring	Starring	Starring	Starring	Starring				Photograph
Capt. "Trapper" John McIntyre	Elliott Gould	Wayne Rogers Pernell Roberts	Starring	Starring	Starring												Starring
Lt. Col. Henry Blake	Roger Bowen	McLean Stevenson	Starring	Starring	Starring												
Maj. Margaret "Hot Lips" Houlihan	Sally Kellerman	Loretta Swit	Starring	Starring	Starring	Starring	Starring	Starring	Starring	Starring	Starring	Starring	Starring				
Maj. (Lt. Col.) Frank Burns	Robert Duvall	Larry Linville	Starring	Starring	Starring	Starring	Starring										
Cpl. Walter "Radar" O'Reilly	Gary Burghoff	Gary Burghoff	Starring	Starring	Starring	Starring	Starring	Starring	Starring	Starring				Guest		Starring	
Capt. B. J. Hunnicutt	—N/a	Mike Farrell				Starring	Starring	Starring	Starring	Starring	Starring	Starring	Starring				
Col. Sherman T. Potter	—N/a	Harry Morgan				Starring	Starring	Starring	Starring	Starring	Starring	Starring	Starring	Starring	Starring		
Cpl./Sgt. Maxwell Q. "Max" Klinger	—N/a	Jamie Farr	Recurring	Recurring	Recurring	Starring	Starring	Starring	Starring	Starring	Starring	Starring	Starring	Starring	Starring		
1st Lt./Capt. John Patrick Francis Mulcahy	Rene Auberjonois	William Christopher	Recurring	Recurring	Recurring	Recurring	Starring	Starring	Starring	Starring	Starring	Starring	Starring	Starring	Starring		
Maj. Charles Emerson Winchester III	—N/a	David Ogden Stiers						Starring	Starring	Starring	Starring	Starring	Starring				
Captain Augustus Bedford "Duke" Forrest	Tom Skerritt	—N/a															
1st Lt. Kealani Kellye	—N/a	Kellye Nakahara	Recurring	Recurring	Recurring	Recurring	Recurring	Recurring	Recurring	Recurring	Recurring	Recurring	Recurring	Voice	Voice		
Soon-Lee Klinger (née Han)	—N/a	Rosalind Chao											Guest	Starring	Starring		

== Main characters ==
=== Benjamin "Hawkeye" Pierce ===
Benjamin "Hawkeye" Pierce
- M*A*S*H character
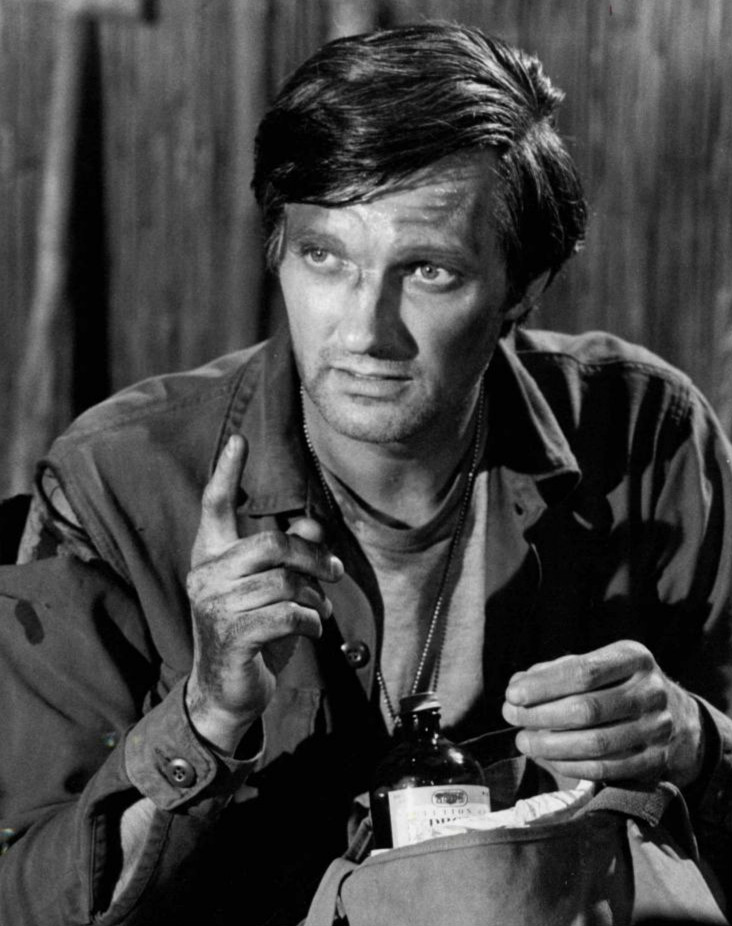
- First appearance: MASH: A Novel About Three Army Doctors
- Last appearance: "Goodbye, Farewell and Amen"
- Portrayed by: Film: Donald Sutherland; Television: Alan Alda

In-universe information
- Gender: Male
- Title(s): Captain and Chief Surgeon
- Family: Benjy Pierce (father--novel); Daniel Pierce (father--TV)
- Spouses: Vanessa Pierce Girlfriend (pretend, in TV episode 1/23)
- Hometown: Crabapple Cove, Maine

Captain Benjamin Franklin "Hawkeye" Pierce (Jr. in the novel) was played by Donald Sutherland in the film, and by Alan Alda in the television series. A principal character of the series, where between long sessions of treating wounded patients, he is found making wisecracks, drinking heavily, carousing, womanizing, and pulling pranks on the people around him, especially Frank Burns and "Hot Lips" Houlihan. In the novel, he serves as a moral center and author's alter ego, chiding Trapper John for calling Major Houlihan "Hot Lips", which Pierce never does. Although just one of an ensemble of characters in author Richard Hooker's MASH: A Novel About Three Army Doctors, in the television series, Hawkeye became the center of the MASH unit's medical activity. In the television series, he becomes the Chief Surgeon of the unit early in the first season. Alan Alda is the only actor to appear in all 256 episodes of the series.

Pierce was born and raised in New England, most often mentioning Crabapple Cove, Maine, as a place that his family had a summer home and with a few references (primarily in the early seasons) to Vermont. His father graduated from medical school and settled as a doctor in Crabapple Cove in 1911. His mother is deceased and he has a sister (like Vermont, they are mentioned in some early episodes and then never again; although, in season 4, he says he was an only child), and he is close to his father. In the novel and film, Hawkeye is married with children, but in the TV series, he is a bachelor and something of a ladies' man (although he fakes being married to Vanessa Pierce Girlfriend in episode 1/23 "Ceasefire".)

He was given the nickname "Hawkeye" by his father, Benjy (Sr.), in the novel and in the series from the character in the novel The Last of the Mohicans, "the only book my old man ever read". His birth name is taken from a member of Hooker's own family named Franklin Pierce.

Although he had a rather unremarkable boyhood, by his own admission he had had several experiences he never forgot. Once when young, he fell overboard in a pond and nearly drowned as a result of a cruel practical joke, leaving him with lifelong claustrophobia. When he was 14, his father was angered to find him in bed with a girl and smoking a cigarette. When he was 12, he discovered his father was dating a female bookkeeper; to keep his father's attention all to himself, Hawkeye selfishly ruined their relationship so they couldn't marry.

He attended the fictional Androscoggin College. In the book and the film, Hawkeye had played football in college; in the series, he is non-athletic. After completing his medical residency (possibly in Chicago; he has a familiarity with the city that implies extended time spent there, e.g., "Adam's Ribs"); he had a common law marriage with a nurse, Carlye Breslin, but they broke up after a year. In 1950 he was drafted into the US Army Medical Corps and sent to serve at the 4077th Mobile Army Surgical Hospital (MASH) during the Korean War. He became Chief Surgeon instead of Burns because Hawkeye specialized in cardiothoracic surgery in addition to general surgery, whereas Burns was only qualified in general surgery. Alda said of Pierce, "Some people think he was very liberal. But he was also a traditional conservative. I mean, he wanted nothing more than to have people leave him alone so he could enjoy his martini, you know? Government should get out of his liquor cabinet".

Pierce has little tolerance for military red tape and protocol, feeling they get in the way of his doing his job, and has little respect for most Regular Army personnel. He never wears rank insignia on his fatigues, usually wears a bathrobe instead of uniform, never polishes his combat boots, and only wears his Class A uniform when he believes appearance can achieve greater good, but does not wear any of the decorations to which he is entitled. (Based on what was told and shown in the course of the series, these would include the World War II Victory Medal, the Army of Occupation Medal, the National Defense Service Medal, the Korean Campaign Medal, the U.N. Service Medal, the Meritorious Unit Commendation, the Army Commendation Medal, the Purple Heart, and possibly a Legion of Merit; plus the Combat Medical Badge for his periodic service at battalion aid stations.) On occasion, he assumes temporary command of the 4077th in the absence or disability of Colonels Blake or Potter.

As a surgeon, he does not like the use of firearms and he refuses to carry a sidearm as required by regulations when serving as Officer of the Day. When he is ordered by Colonel Potter to carry his issue pistol on a trip to a ROK aid station and they are ambushed on the road, he fires it into the air rather than at their attackers. This was after he told the gun "You're fired." He is also a chronic alcoholic, for three years in Korea drinking every day three times more heavily than the average person [his homemade still; daily tabs at the MASH Officers' Club, and Rosie's Bar] and also drinks 12-year-old Scotch whisky and Seagrams (Canadian whisky) – the latter so heavily that in the episode "Bottle Fatigue" Klinger decides to buy stock in Seagrams.

In the series finale, "Goodbye, Farewell, and Amen", Hawkeye experiences a mental breakdown when a Korean woman suffocates her infant child in response to his frantic demand that she quiet her child lest enemy soldiers hear it and discover them. In talking to psychiatrist Dr. Sidney Freedman he first says that the woman had suffocated a chicken, until Freedman led him to admit the repressed memory – the horror of a mother smothering her own baby. He recommended that Hawkeye return to the 4077th for the end of the war to come to terms with what he had endured. In real life, Pierce would have faced a Section 8 discharge due to his emotional breakdown, having served in Korea for at least two years in a MASH unit.

In an episode earlier in the series, Hawkeye is mistakenly reported dead. He boards a Quartermaster Corps bus/hearse which has dead soldiers aboard, saying he has just about had his fill of war, and admits he is tired of seeing death every day. In one episode, a temporary replacement surgeon from Tokyo General Hospital, who cut his teeth performing meatball surgery under impossible conditions in the Pusan Perimeter at the start of the war, does indeed crack under pressure and probably received a Section 8 due to his emotional breakdown that prevents him working as a combat surgeon.

When the Korean Armistice Agreement is announced, he states his intention to return to Crabapple Cove to be a local doctor who has the time to get to know his patients, instead of contending with the endless flow of casualties he faced during his time in Korea. He is depicted doing this in Hooker's two sequels, M*A*S*H Goes to Maine and M*A*S*H Mania.

=== Trapper John McIntyre ===
Trapper John McIntyre
- M*A*S*H character
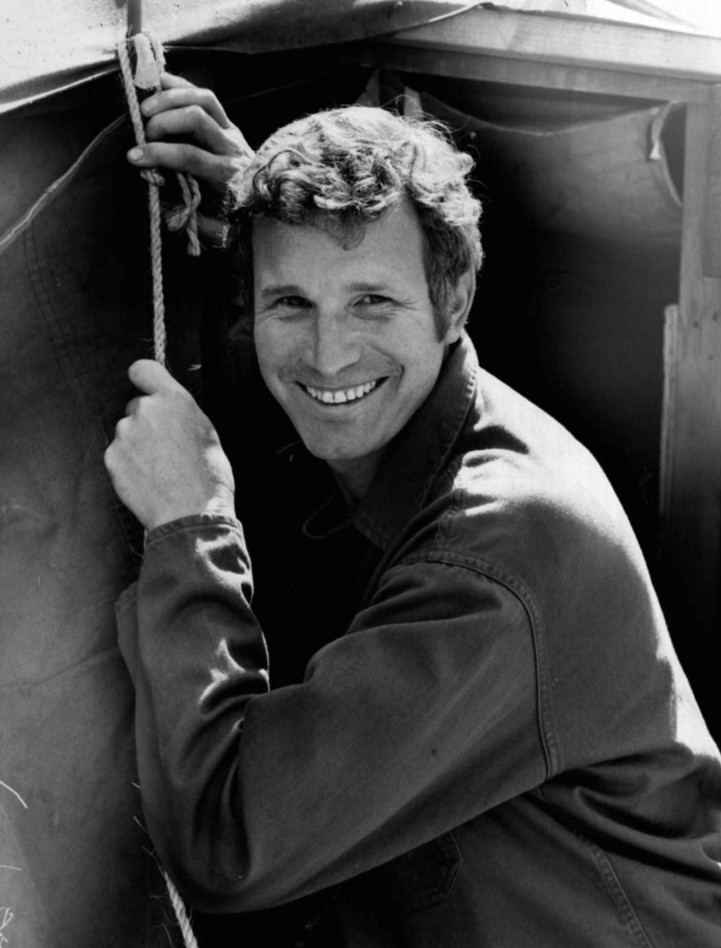
- First appearance: MASH: A Novel About Three Army Doctors
- Last appearance: "Abyssinia, Henry" (M*A*S*H) "The Elusive Butterfly" (Trapper John, M.D.)
- Portrayed by: Film: Elliott Gould; Television (M*A*S*H): Wayne Rogers; Television (Trapper John, M.D.): Pernell Roberts

In-universe information
- Gender: Male
- Title: Captain
- Spouse: Louise McIntyre
- Children: Cathy McIntyre (daughter); Becky McIntyre (daughter)
- Hometown: Boston, Massachusetts

Captain "Trapper" John Francis Xavier McIntyre appears in the novels, the film (played by Elliott Gould), the M*A*S*H TV series (played by Wayne Rogers), and the spin-off Trapper John, M.D. series (played by Pernell Roberts). He is one of the main characters in the M*A*S*H TV series during the first three seasons and the central character of the latter series. His nickname comes from an incident in which he was caught having sex with a woman in the lavatory aboard a Boston and Maine Railroad train: she claimed in her defense that "he trapped me!"

In the book and the film, Trapper John is a graduate of Dartmouth College, having played quarterback on the school's football team, and serves as thoracic surgeon of the 4077th. In the film, he has a dry, sardonic, deadpan sense of humor, while in the M*A*S*H television series he is more of a class clown. Trapper spends much of his time on the series engaging in mischief with Hawkeye Pierce, with the two playing practical jokes on Majors Frank Burns and Margaret "Hot Lips" Houlihan, heavy drinking, and trying to seduce women. While Trapper expresses great love for his wife and daughters, he also fraternizes with the nurses a great deal with no pretense of fidelity. He admits frankly that his wife collects his pay for a special fund to pay private investigators who will spy on him, which will begin the second night he gets home from Korea.

In the film, Hawkeye and Trapper are given roughly equal focus, but in the TV series, the character devolved to become more of a sidekick to the character of Hawkeye. This frustrated Rogers, and in combination with a dispute over the terms of the original five-year contract, he quit the show shortly before production of the fourth season began; the character of Trapper was abruptly discharged from the Army and sent back to the United States. The character of B. J. Hunnicutt was created to replace him, with the two-part Season Four opener created to explain his absence (the third episode introducing Col. Potter was intended to be the premiere episode).

The character returned to television in 1979 in the medical drama series Trapper John, M.D. Now played by Pernell Roberts, the character is depicted in the then-present day as the middle-aged Chief of Surgery at a San Francisco hospital. Regarding his family life, he is divorced from his wife; the only mention of his children is that he has a grown son. This version of the character is in continuity with the film rather than the TV series, but no other characters from either production appear in this series, making Trapper John the only M*A*S*H character to be depicted on-screen in the present day at the time of airing. In the first season, McIntyre's chief nurse, nicknamed "Starch", is said to have served with/worked for him in Korea, but never appeared in the novel, movie, or TV series. Trapper John, along with The Mary Tyler Moore Show's Lou Grant, thus became one of a handful of 1970s television characters to be successfully adapted from situation comedy to drama.

=== B. J. Hunnicutt ===
B. J. Hunnicutt
- M*A*S*H character
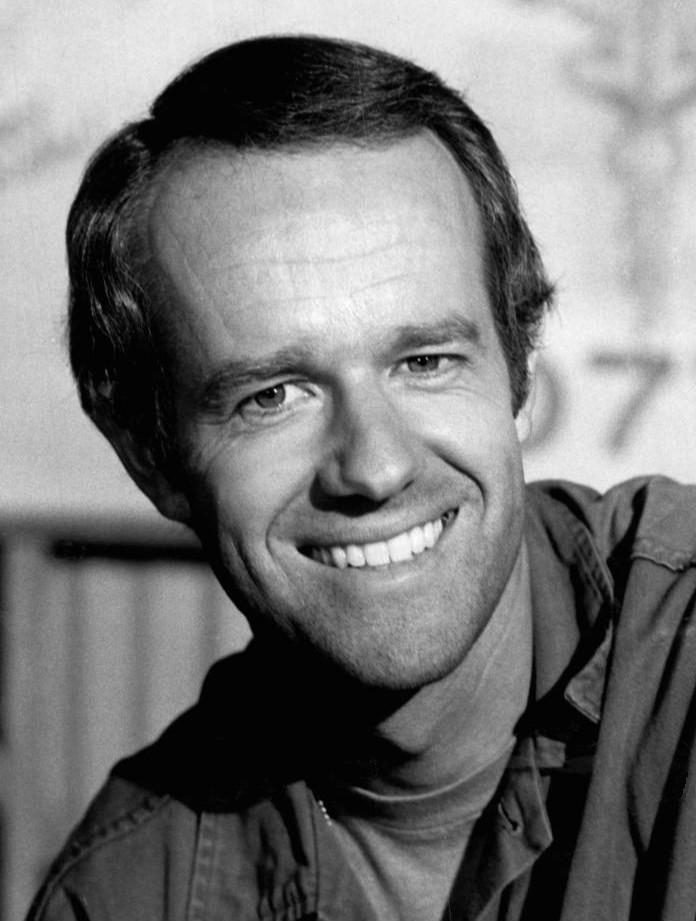
- First appearance: "Welcome to Korea"
- Last appearance: "Goodbye, Farewell and Amen"
- Portrayed by: Television: Mike Farrell

In-universe information
- Gender: Male
- Title: Captain
- Family: Jay Hunnicutt (father); Bea Hunnicutt (mother)
- Spouse: Peg Hunnicutt (née Hayden)
- Children: Erin Hunnicutt (daughter)
- Hometown: Mill Valley, California

Captain B. J. Hunnicutt is played by Mike Farrell in the TV show. He replaced Trapper, both in his position within the unit and as an ally of Hawkeye Pierce and a foil of Frank Burns, appearing in all but one episode of the rest of the series. Although he glibly answers that the initials "B. J." stand for "anything you want", he tells Hawkeye that his name is not an initialism, but simply B. J., derived from the names of his parents, Bea and Jay.

Hunnicutt resided in Mill Valley, California, before he was drafted. He was educated at Stanford University and was a member of the Tau Phi Epsilon fraternity. He is a third-generation doctor in his family. He went through his military training at Fort Sam Houston. When he arrived at MASH 4077 in September 1952 he is 28 years old; later when he meets a medical college friend "Practical Joker" it is revealed that B. J. has been both married and practicing medicine for 10 years.

He is devoted to his wife Peg (née Hayden) who writes many letters to him while he is in Korea. The couple has a daughter, Erin, who was born shortly before B. J. left for Korea. In contrast to the philandering Trapper John, B. J. remains generally faithful to his wife and daughter, saying that it is not because he thinks it's morally wrong to do otherwise, but "I simply don't want to." One time he accidentally had an unplanned one-night stand while comforting a nurse, and was also similarly tempted into having an affair with a visiting female journalist. The nine months he spends in Korea causes him to have an emotional breakdown because of the separation from his wife and child. He is also more reserved than his predecessor, often serving as the voice of reason when Hawkeye goes too far. Nonetheless, he also participates in and initiates practical jokes, such as secretly switching Major Winchester's clothing for that of other soldiers to make him think he is gaining or losing weight, or filling Frank Burns' air raid foxholes with water and then having the visiting Sidney Freedman yell "Air raid!". On other occasions, B. J. encourages members of the 4077th to play jokes on each other, starting escalating joke wars for his amusement, with neither side knowing that he is the instigator. Unfortunately, this has often backfired on him when both parties he was pranking find out and retaliate. B. J. is also an inveterate, bordering on compulsive, punster.

While he assumes the same general disregard for military discipline exhibited by both Hawkeye and Trapper – going as far as to grow out a moustache at the start of the 7th season in clear violation of Army uniform guidelines (and would be retained by the character for the rest of the series, though Farrell would shave it off immediately after the series ended) – B. J. professes stronger moral values. For example, in the episode "Preventative Medicine" he refuses to participate in a scheme to have an overzealous officer relieved of command by performing an unnecessary appendectomy on him. He is a skilled surgeon, willing to take extraordinary measures to save a patient, such as in "Heroes", where he undertakes an experimental procedure he had read about in a medical journal, using a homemade, primitive open-chest defibrillator and open-chest heart massage. On another occasion, he gave away a Bronze Star he was awarded because he felt he did not deserve it.

He actively avoids the finality of farewells, but when the 4077th is disbanded in the series finale, he is last seen riding his Indian motorcycle away from camp, while Hawkeye sees from a helicopter that B. J. has arranged painted white stones into the word "GOODBYE", visible from the air. On an episode of St. Elsewhere, it was mentioned and implied by Dr. Mark Craig (portrayed by William Daniels) that B. J. Hunnicutt had remained in Korea where he was reassigned to another unit following the July 1953 deactivation of the 4077th Mobile Army Surgical Hospital at the end of M*A*S*H's finale and Dr. Craig also mentions serving in Korea with B. J. as his drinking buddy.

=== Henry Blake ===
Henry Blake
- M*A*S*H character
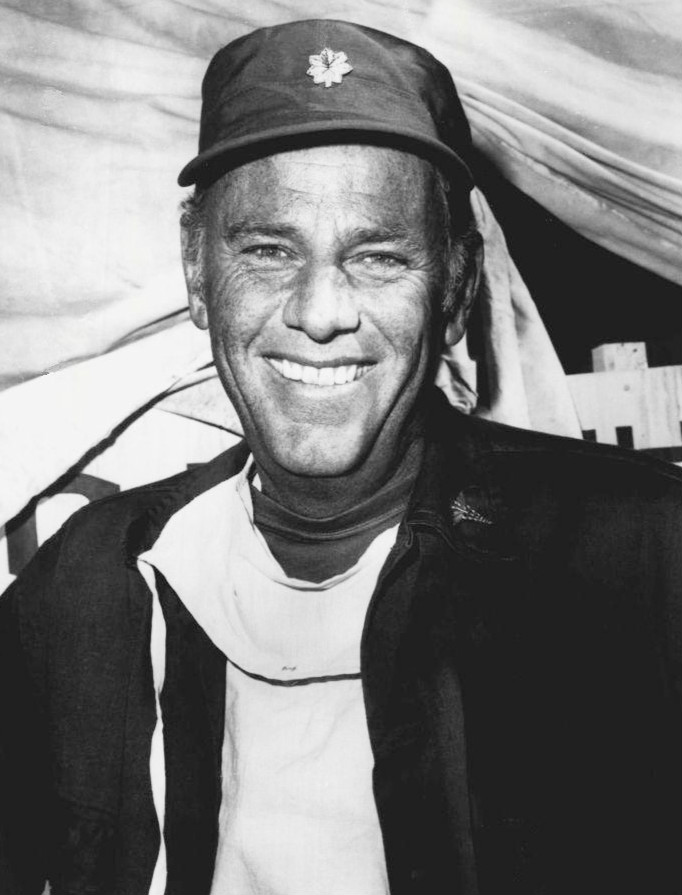
- First appearance: MASH: A Novel About Three Army Doctors
- Last appearance: "Abyssinia, Henry" (on screen)
- Portrayed by: Film: Roger Bowen; Television: McLean Stevenson

In-universe information
- Gender: Male
- Title: Lieutenant Colonel
- Spouse: Mildred/Lorraine Blake
- Children: Andrew Blake (son); Molly Blake (daughter); Jane Blake (daughter)
- Hometown: Bloomington, Illinois

Lieutenant Colonel Henry Braymore Blake is introduced in the 1968 novel M*A*S*H, and is also a character in the film (played by Roger Bowen) and television series (played by McLean Stevenson). He is a surgeon and the original commanding officer of the 4077th MASH unit. He is beloved for his down-to-earth, laid-back manner by many under his command, especially Hawkeye and Trapper John (with whom he drinks, flouts regulations, and chases women). However, he is scorned for it by those who prefer strict military discipline, such as Frank Burns and Margaret "Hot Lips" Houlihan.

In the film and novel, he is a career Army physician, having been commissioned before World War II. In the television series, he is 44 years old and a reservist called up to active duty and taken from his private practice in Bloomington, Illinois. Henry attended the University of Illinois Urbana-Champaign, where he was the football team's athletic trainer. He tells Hawkeye he has "a great practice back home", but a "routine" one, and that by serving in Korea, he is doing more doctoring than he would otherwise do in a lifetime. While Henry is in command of the 4077th, his wife – called Mildred in earlier episodes, Lorraine in later ones (the reason is never explained) – gives birth to a son back in Bloomington. Henry would never meet his son. As shown in Episode 2/16, "Henry in Love", Blake holds a Commendation Medal, a Purple Heart, an Army of Occupation Medal, the National Defense Service Medal, the Korean War reCampaign Medal, and the U.N. Service Medal. He describes his wife in unflattering terms as having very expensive false teeth, varicose veins, a fistful of credit cards, looking like Frank Burns in drag, and that he only married her because she was a good cook. (Blake may have been exaggerating; in a home movie sent to the 4077th and then viewed by Blake, Pierce, McIntyre and O'Reilly, Lorraine appears reasonably attractive.)

Likewise, when she wrote to him about being tempted to have an affair with a dentist and that she understood if he was tempted to have an affair, Blake brags to Pierce and Trapper that she had given him permission to have an affair, which she had not. (In fact Blake is a serial adulterer, having interacted with six women, including three M*A*S*H 4077 nurses.)

Henry is a good man and a capable surgeon but unfocused and often ineffective as a commanding officer. In a letter to his father, Hawkeye Pierce describes Henry's lack of leadership ability: "As a commanding officer, it's like being on a sinking liner, running to the bridge, and finding out the captain is Daffy Duck."

Henry often gets flustered when an important decision needs to be made. For example, in the episode "Rainbow Bridge", he has to decide whether to send his doctors into enemy territory for an exchange of wounded prisoners. He hems and haws before telling his doctors, "Whatever you guys decide is fine with me." (In a fourth season episode, "Quo Vadis, Captain Chandler", Colonel Flagg complains to Colonel Potter, "The last C.O. in this unit couldn't make a command decision without a month's notice.") Fortunately for Henry, his company clerk, Radar O'Reilly, can usually anticipate his C.O.'s wishes and turn them into credible military orders.

Henry's strength as a commander is his ability to maintain the morale of his unit, which he does through personal loyalty and indulgence of the lunacy that is a hallmark of the 4077th (as well as frequent participation). This success is demonstrated by the unit's outstanding 97.6% casualty survival rate.

Blake also shows superior skills in assessing medical talent, when he ignores military rank and appoints Hawkeye Pierce as chief surgeon over Frank Burns. (Although junior in rank, Pierce was a specialist surgeon in chest wounds while Burns was a general practitioner.)

Blake in the TV series is compassionate but pragmatic at times: in the early episode "Sometimes You Hear The Bullet", he bluntly tells Hawkeye "When I went to school as an Army surgeon, they taught me two rules. Rule #1 is that in war, young men die. And Rule #2 ... is that doctors can't change Rule #1."

When McLean Stevenson decided to leave the show at the end of the third season, his character was scripted to be discharged and sent home as a way to write him out of the series. However, the producers added a final scene to his last episode in which Radar delivers news that Blake's plane has been shot down with no survivors. The characters are shocked by the news; the actors were shocked too, as they were not informed of the script change to have Blake die until just before the scene was shot. In Richard Hooker's 1977 novel M*A*S*H Mania, which takes place in the early 1970s, Henry Blake has become a general and helps Hawkeye in a scheme to rid Crabapple Cove of a troublesome psychologist.

=== Sherman T. Potter ===
Sherman T. Potter
- M*A*S*H character
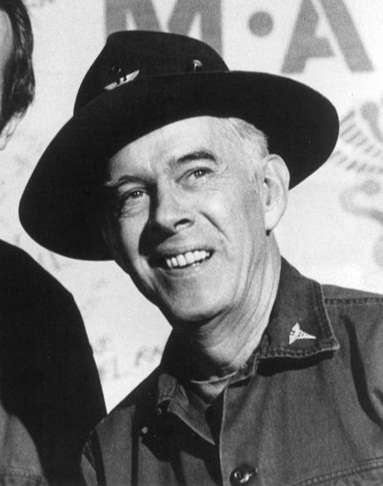
- First appearance: "Welcome to Korea: Part 2"
- Last appearance: "Saturday's Heroes" (AfterMASH)
- Portrayed by: Harry Morgan

In-universe information
- Gender: Male
- Title: Colonel
- Spouse: Mildred Potter
- Children: Evelyn "Evvy" Ennis (née Potter) (daughter); Son who is a dentist
- Relatives: Corey Ennis (grandson); Sherry Pershing Potter (granddaughter)
- Hometown: Hannibal, Missouri

Colonel Sherman Tecumseh Potter appears in the M*A*S*H and AfterMASH television series. He was portrayed by Harry Morgan and replaced the departing character of Henry Blake as commanding officer of the 4077th MASH. The character appeared in all but three of the subsequent episodes.

Potter is from Hannibal, Missouri, one-quarter Cherokee and possesses a passion and fondness for horses. In typical M*A*S*H inconsistency, Potter's birth year was variously mentioned as being 1883 (he claimed to have joined Theodore Roosevelt's "Roughriders" as a marginally legal 15-year-old enlistee in 1898), 1890, or 1900 or 1902. The most plausible date would be 1890. In the Season 10 episode "Pressure Points", Potter tells Sidney Friedman that he is 62 years old. (The 1883 birthdate appears unlikely, since this would have made Potter nearly 70 during the Korean Conflict. The 1900 and 1902 birthdates would indicate he would be only around 49–50 during the Korean War.) Throughout his tenure in the series, it is occasionally mentioned that Potter is "close to retirement."

Potter joined the US Army cavalry as a private during World War I and subsequently rose to the rank of sergeant. Although never deployed as cavalry, the 6th and 15th Cavalry Regiments were sent to France and served in the American Expeditionary Forces in 1918. As the 15th was dismounted and sent into the trenches as infantry to relieve exhausted doughboys, it seems probable Potter saw combat with this battle-hardened unit in the Great War.

Although his career was in the Horse Cavalry until 1924 when he married, he has told stories about being in the Infantry during World War I. During combat in World War I, at the July 1918 Battle of Château-Thierry, he was mustard gassed, leaving him blind for a month in a French hospital. In the September–November 1918 Battle of the Argonne Forest, he was "lost for three days, taken prisoner, head shaved and beaten to a pulp". Several of his teeth were knocked out by his German captors, for which he was later awarded a Purple Heart, one of four he holds: two from World War I, one for his teeth being broken by the Germans and another for having been gassed; one from World War II when his illicit still on Guam blew up on him; and one from Korea, for being shot in the buttocks by a sniper. After the Great War, he went to medical school, and began his service as an Army doctor in 1932, serving in World War II. One of his most cherished possessions is his Good Conduct Medal, an award "only given to enlisted men", Potter explains to Radar while unpacking that he has a "Good Conduct Medal with a clasp." That means he was an enlisted man for at least six years before he becomes a doctor. It is framed and hung behind his desk during his tenure at the 4077th. However, the earliest a soldier in the army was credited towards this award was 1940, and as a physician Potter would have been a commissioned officer and so ineligible for it at the time. He also has claimed to be in two different theaters of War during World War II: In the summer of 1944 on Guam; in December 1944 in the Battle of the Bulge. Potter is married to Mildred, and they have only one daughter and one grandson in some episodes, while in others he has multiple children – including a son born in 1926 who is a dentist – and grandchildren.

As a "Regular Army" career officer, Potter is a more capable commander than his predecessor, Henry Blake. He is better able to lead the 4077th through a crisis, such as a deluge of wounded soldiers, a "Bug Out" (forced evacuation), a weather-related crisis (such as a rainstorm, windstorm, or a freezing winter with supply shortages), or an outbreak of an infectious disease, such as hepatitis. He is also more capable of making command decisions, even if they go against Army regulations. (In the episode, "Mr. and Mrs. Who?," for example, Potter approves Hawkeye's idea to use a low saline solution to replace sodium in a hemorrhagic fever patient, after the high saline solution has been banned by the U.S. Army.)

Despite his stern military bearing, Potter is a relatively relaxed and laid-back commander, not above involving himself in camp hijinks and understanding the need for fun and games to boost morale during wartime, particularly in the high-pressure atmosphere of a MASH. When Hawkeye and B. J. invite Potter to their tent for a post-surgery drink just after his assuming command, he is very affable and complimentary of their brewing skills, even giving them tips on how to improve their gin still and get a higher yield of alcohol. He also has his eccentricities, including a love of horses from his cavalry days and an ability to use his Regular Army connections to the unit's advantage. Unlike Blake, he is not afraid to put his foot down when the camp's antics get out of hand, but this is motivated by not wanting to see his troops get into trouble outside of the camp. In addition, Potter, who had been managing administrative work before his assignment to the 4077th with the asset of knowing many of his superiors as personal acquaintances, possesses formidable skills as a surgeon and for keeping morale high in the operating room.

Potter is well-liked by his subordinates, especially Radar, who comes to see him as a mentor and father figure after Blake's transfer stateside and subsequent death. Potter receives more respect than Blake did from Major Houlihan, but Major Burns harbors a grudge against him after being passed over for command. In turn, Potter holds Burns's feigned military bearing and subpar medical skills in contempt. Potter takes pride in the competency of the rest of the medical staff despite their antics. Burns's replacement, Major Winchester, has a grudging respect for Potter, even though their personalities are often at odds with one another. Potter initially takes a hard line against Klinger's attempts to get discharged but is convinced to let him continue cross-dressing and eventually assigns him to be his new company clerk after Radar received a hardship discharge. As an indication of their respect for him, in the final episode Hawkeye and B. J. formally salute Potter as he leaves the camp, one of the few times either is shown doing so.

The character also appeared as a new central character in AfterMASH, a spin-off starring the three cast members who had voted (unsuccessfully) to continue the first series. Potter became chief of staff and chief of surgery of the fictional General Pershing VA Hospital in River Bend, Missouri, where he is joined by Klinger and his wife Soon-Lee, and Father Mulcahy. Among the resident in-patients is one of Potter's subordinates from World War I, who addresses him as "Sarge" as opposed to his retired rank of colonel.

=== Frank Burns ===
Frank Burns
- M*A*S*H character
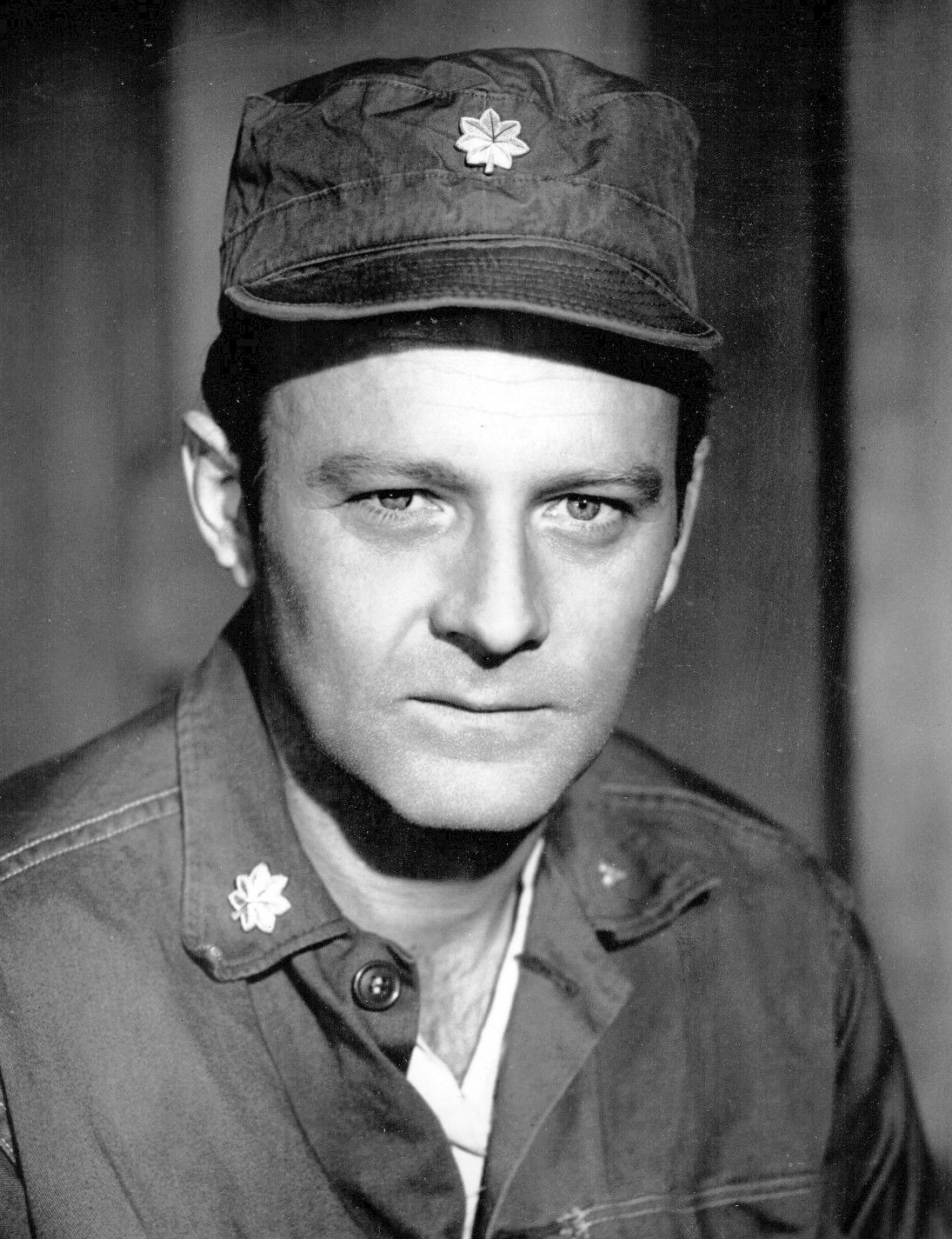
- Larry Linville as Major Frank Burns on the CBS-TV M*A*S*H series
- First appearance: MASH: A Novel About Three Army Doctors
- Last appearance: "Margaret's Marriage"
- Portrayed by: Film: Robert Duvall; Television: Larry Linville

In-universe information
- Nickname: Ferret Face
- Gender: Male
- Titles: Captain in Hooker's novel; Major in Film and TV series; with a departing promotion to Lieutenant Colonel, in TV series
- Spouse: Louise Burns
- Children: Three daughters
- Hometown: Fort Wayne, Indiana

Major (later Lieutenant Colonel) Franklin Delano Marion "Frank" Burns is the executive officer and main antagonist in the film (played by Robert Duvall) and the first five seasons of the television series (Larry Linville). Burns first appeared in the original novel, where he had the rank of captain.

In the novel, Burns is a well-off doctor who attended medical school, but whose training as a surgeon was limited to an apprenticeship with his father in Fort Wayne, Indiana. Nonetheless, he maintains a dismissive attitude toward his better-trained colleagues, blaming others for his failures. He unjustly accuses a rookie orderly, Boone (Bud Cort in the film), of killing one of his patients and nearly kills another patient, earning him retaliatory assaults from Duke and Trapper John. As Burns holds the same rank as Hawkeye in the novel, Blake tries to make sure neither is on duty at the same time, but cannot do so when things get busy. His medical incompetence causes Colonel Blake to instead assign Trapper John as Chief Surgeon. In the novel, the extent of the relationship between Burns and Houlihan is unclear and only rumored to be sexual. In the film, it is overtly sexual and broadcast throughout the camp when Radar puts a microphone under Hot Lips' bunk in her tent. After the "Swampmen" learn that Burns is having an affair with Houlihan, Hawkeye taunts him about it, baiting him to attack just as Blake enters the tent. The next day, Burns is permanently sent away for psychiatric evaluation in a straitjacket, shot full of tranquilizers. In the novel, the confrontation is less violent, and Burns is simply transferred to a VA hospital stateside.

In the film and the subsequent TV series, Frank Burns's rank is that of major. The film version includes elements of the novel's Major Jonathan Hobson, a very religious man who prays for all souls to be saved. In the TV series, he is very high-strung, with a penchant for uttering what are often bizarre or redundant clichés and malapropisms; one example is from "The Interview" (season 4, episode 24), in which Burns describes marriage as "the headstone of American society".

In the TV series, though by military rank Burns is second-in-command of the unit, he is in fact outranked in medical matters by Hawkeye, who reluctantly accepts appointment by Colonel Blake as Chief Surgeon. Burns longs for command of the 4077th himself and resorts to underhanded means in attempting to achieve this end.

Among his underhanded schemes are filing misleading complaints about Blake and unsuccessfully preventing Hawkeye and Trapper from testifying in Blake's defense. When Burns is left in command of the unit (per military regulations), he generally micromanages camp operations, just for the sake of being in command but demonstrates a profound lack of military competence as well. In an early episode, before his character becomes more of a buffoon, he demonstrated himself to be an efficient, though still micromanaging, commander. In another episode, Burns is gullible enough to believe that the US Army Corps of Engineers is going to make MASH hospitals amphibious.

In "The Novocaine Mutiny", Burns is left in temporary command when the 4077th is inundated with a deluge of casualties. Burns and Hawkeye recount different versions of the events. Burns claims that he was performing superior work, even going so far as to donate blood to a critically wounded soldier in between treating patients and completing the Last Rites benediction in Latin for the deceased after Father Mulcahy passed out from exhaustion. Burns further asserts that the other surgeons could not keep up with him and complained that he was pushing them too hard. In Hawkeye's presumably far more accurate account, Frank was borderline hysterical and performed his triage duties with singular incompetence, which resulted in the near-deaths of multiple casualties. After being confronted by Hawkeye, Burns was knocked unconscious by the operating room door. The JAG colonel investigating the incident to determine if a court-martial is warranted concluded there were no grounds for a court-martial, and indicated that according to Burns' record, "If you hadn't been drafted as a doctor, I think you'd have been assigned as a pastry chef."

A borderline-incompetent surgeon (he flunked out of two medical schools, twice failed the medical exams, and only passed by buying the answers the third time; even so it took him seven years to complete medical school). His reputation for incompetence has spread even to the South Korean Army. He also failed to become a nurse when he could not fold bed sheets with hospital corners, and in his hometown the local funeral director sends him Thank You cards every Christmas.

The other doctors of the 4077th have little to no respect for the Major. They looked at him with amused contempt when he once referred to himself as the unit's "Deputy Chief Surgeon". In one episode, one of Burns's patients had to have emergency surgery because Burns was too lazy to exteriorize a patient's colon during an operation. Henry Blake once threatened to bust Burns down to male nurse if he didn't get out of his way. Potter once told Burns his light bulb had been out for as long as he had known him; and on another occasion, told him that his brain had a charley horse. Hawkeye told a court of inquiry that Burns had created more widows and orphans than salmonella, and a psychiatrist that the war "forced me to operate next to a surgeon who can't cut his toenails without committing malpractice"; Trapper John sneers Burns could not cut salami without bungling it; B. J. remarked that Hawkeye claimed Burns became a surgeon after washing out of embalming school, told Colonel Potter that Burns got his medical degree from a Cracker Jack box, and told Frank to his face that his sanity had sprung a leak. Hawkeye taught the Korean ward boys to say, "You tell 'em, Ferret Face!" on cue. Even Hot Lips, when asked by Frank what she thought of him as a surgeon, replied, "Frank, don't you have enough pain?" The MASH surgeons get a big laugh when they see a film of his wedding – even then Burns could not hold a knife while cutting his wedding cake. Hawkeye remarked, "Watch the cake die of malpractice!"

Frank had a poor relationship with his father, who would strike him at the dinner table if he ever talked out of turn. Furthermore, Burn's father pretended to like his son, but actually hated him. His older brother despised him, pinning the nickname of "Ferret Face" on him as a boy. When the Swampmen learn of this, it becomes Frank's nickname at the 4077th as well, used by most of the unit and even on occasion by Major Houlihan. The one person who genuinely cares about him is his mother; his parents and brother were his only relations at his wedding. He was scoutmaster of the local Boy Scout troop until he accidentally set fire to himself. He brags about having a large house, an expensive car, a yacht and being a member of two men's clubs.

Burns also has collateral duties as M*A*S*H 4077's Physical Fitness instructor, Rodent Control Officer, Food Procurement Officer, Food Inspector (where he came down with a case of food poisoning), Garbage Officer, and Sanitary Disposal Officer, duties normally performed by the most junior officer of the unit, not a field grade officer who is on paper the second-in-command. Every Friday he gives boring, nonsensical orientation lectures to newly arrived enlisted personnel about why the United States is in the Korean War.

Although Burns was Hawkeye's archenemy and Blake was Hawkeye's friend, one trait shared by Colonel Blake and Major Burns was a hypocritical attitude toward their marriage vows. Besides Houlihan, Burns has had affairs with his housekeeper, his receptionist, and two nurses at the 4077th. Blake had affairs with a call girl, an underage girl, three nurses at the 4077th MASH, and a recent college graduate member of the press corps (the last so serious that Henry came close to deserting his family for her).

In addition to his gullibility, Burns was shown to be incredibly greedy, selfish, and occasionally childish. Back home, he is involved in a prescription kickback racket and falsifies his income taxes. He is also overly suspicious of Koreans, going as far as to claim that South Koreans are communist infiltrators and hustlers, and is openly racist against Native Americans, although Colonel Potter, being part Cherokee, sternly puts a stop to that early on. He is an ardent supporter of the anti-communist Senator Joseph McCarthy and appears irritated to learn his wife is becoming involved in Republican Party envelope-stuffing campaigns.

Despite his ongoing affair with Major Houlihan, he is unwilling to divorce his wife because his money, stocks, and house are in her name. In one episode, his greed is such that he turns down a transfer to another unit because he is tricked by Hawkeye and Trapper into thinking there is gold in the hills near the camp. He twice applied for and received a Purple Heart for being "wounded" in combat: first, for slipping and falling on the way the shower; and second, for getting a "shell fragment" (actually a bit of eggshell) in his eye. Both medals were stolen by Hawkeye and given to people who deserved them: an underage Marine (played by Ron Howard); and a Korean mother and her infant son who had been shot just before she gave birth. An example of his childishness was shown when Burns is passed over for command of the 4077th in favor of Colonel Potter; Frank has a temper tantrum and runs away until he gets cold, tired and hungry.

Burns' only friend in the unit is head nurse Major Margaret Houlihan, with whom he has an ongoing affair. They believe their romance is discreet, but it is common knowledge in the camp. They share a disdain for the "un-military" doctors, against whom they conspire ineffectively. His wife eventually learns of the affair and threatens him with divorce; he denies it, describing Houlihan as an "old warhorse" and an "army mule with bosoms", beginning a rift that leads to her engagement to Donald Penobscott, a handsome lieutenant colonel stationed in Tokyo.

Burns becomes even more erratic than usual after Houlihan's engagement and even a little before, such as when she was attending a meeting in Tokyo during Season 4 without him. During Margaret's stay in Tokyo, Burns drinks all of Hawkeye's booze, cleans out Hawkeye and B. J.'s poker winnings of $200, and confesses that he wants to have affairs with two other nurses besides Houlihan: Nurse Kellye, and an unnamed "little red-haired nurse". After Margaret becomes engaged, he nearly blows himself up with a grenade in an attempt to prove himself courageous by capturing war prisoners. This leads to him "capturing" a Korean family and their ox, and almost firing his carbine in Potter's office at the suggestion that he is heading for a Section Eight discharge. Distraught and exhausted, Burns, speaking on the telephone to his mother, tells her that Major Houlihan had just pretended to like him, "like Dad used to."

Following Houlihan's marriage in the fifth-season finale, "Margaret's Marriage" (also Larry Linville's last appearance on camera as Frank Burns), in the two-part sixth-season premiere episode "Fade Out, Fade In" that introduces his temporary (later permanent) replacement, Major Charles Emerson Winchester III, the 4077th learns that shortly after the wedding, Burns suffered a mental breakdown while on a week's leave in Seoul. He accosted a blonde female WAC on the street, begging to manicure her toenails; a blonde female Red Cross worker on a bus, whose buttons he tried to bite off; and an army general and his blonde wife in an offoro bath, mistaking the couple for the Penobscots. He is transferred stateside for psychiatric evaluation and although the 4077th is delighted to be finally rid of him, Burns has the last laugh. He telephones Hawkeye and B. J. as he is being shipped back to the United States and tells them that not only has he been cleared of all charges, but has been promoted to Lieutenant Colonel and assigned to a veterans' hospital in his hometown.

Frank is last referred to in the second-to-last episode "As Time Goes By", where the question is asked (by Winchester) if anything that was put in the 4077th's time capsule belonged to Burns. Hawkeye says he'd thought about putting in a scalpel but decided not to, reasoning that a later civilization might consider it a weapon.

Nothing further is known about the character's fate post-show from the TV series. However, in the William E. Butterworth MASH Goes To ... books, reference was made to Burns being involved with the Tonsils, Adenoids, and Vas Deferens Society, a group that promotes tonsillectomies and vasectomies for large fees.

Burns's departure from the series stemmed from the expiration of Linville's original five-year contract for the series, which he opted not to renew, concluding that there was simply no room for further development in the character.

=== Margaret "Hot Lips" Houlihan ===
Margaret "Hot Lips" Houlihan
- M*A*S*H character
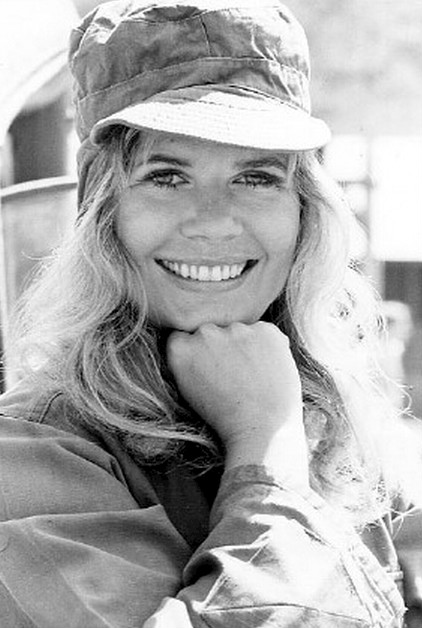
- First appearance: MASH: A Novel About Three Army Doctors
- Last appearance: "Goodbye, Farewell and Amen"
- Portrayed by: Film: Sally Kellerman; Television: Loretta Swit

In-universe information
- Nickname: Hot Lips
- Gender: Female
- Title: Major
- Family: Alvin Houlihan (father)
- Spouse: Donald Penobscott (divorced)
- Hometown: Fort Ord, California

Major Margaret "Hot Lips" Houlihan appears in the novel, the film (surname "O'Houlihan" - played by Sally Kellerman), and the TV series (Loretta Swit). She is the Regular Army head nurse of the 4077th and begins allied with Major Frank Burns against the more civilian doctors of the unit. Later in the series, particularly after the departure of Burns, she becomes a more sympathetic character, softening her attitude while still serving as a foil for their antics.

Margaret is a military brat, born in an Army base hospital in 1920, the daughter of career artillery (or cavalry) officer Alvin "Howitzer Al" Houlihan (played by Andrew Duggan in the TV series). The series implies she is ethnic Irish: In the pilot episode Blake refers to her by her full name as O'Houlihan; while Colonel Potter remarks that she comes from a race that likes to settle arguments with their fists ("Souvenirs"). She entered nursing school in 1938 and graduated in 1942 when she joined the Army. She served in World War II but it is unknown if she served stateside or overseas. (On the rare occasions Houlihan is shown wearing her Class A uniform, while her ribbons include the usual Korean War decorations everyone received and commendation medals, she does not have an American Campaign Medal, an Asiatic–Pacific Campaign Medal, or a European–African–Middle Eastern Campaign Medal, a World War II Victory Medal, or an Army of Occupation Medal. However, as a similar omission exists regarding Colonel Potter's decorations, this may simply have been an error by the costume department.) She did mention that she had served in Berlin in 1948.

Her nickname "Hot Lips" has different origins in the original novel, film, and TV show. In the novel, the phrase is first used by Trapper John McIntyre, when he is flirting with Margaret after learning about her affair with Frank Burns. Calling her "Hot Lips", Trapper suggests that they should get together since he has become Chief Surgeon and she is the Chief Nurse. In the film, the nickname originates from a scene in which she has a tryst with Burns. Unbeknownst to them, a hidden PA microphone is broadcasting their conversation to the whole camp, including her growl to Frank, "Kiss my hot lips". In the TV show, the origin of her nickname is never shown or explained in detail, though it seems to refer to various aspects of her passionate nature. Midway through the series, the "Hot Lips" nickname phases out, with characters addressing her as either Margaret or Major Houlihan, though her nickname is still referenced occasionally. For instance, in the sixth-season episode "Patient 4077", when Margaret is in a bad mood after losing her wedding ring, a nurse describes her as "Hot Lips Houlihan: Blonde land mine". In another episode, Colonel Potter was passionately kissed by Margaret after granting her a 72-hour leave to visit her husband in Tokyo; when she turned him loose, he said, "Do you know what I like about a nurse with hot lips? Exactly!" In the seventh-season episode "None Like It Hot", after Margaret talks about a bathtub that is supposed to be kept secret, Hawkeye says to her, "Would you please keep your hot lips sealed?", and in the second part of the two-part eighth-season episode "Good Bye, Radar", Radar says, "Wow! Hot Lips!" after he is kissed by Margaret. She is one of the few Americans in the 4077th who speaks Korean, though most of her Korean seems medically related.

Margaret is the head nurse of the 4077th MASH, the highest-ranking female officer in the unit, and fiercely protective of the women under her command. She uses her sex appeal to her professional advantage as well as personal satisfaction, as shown by her relationship with Frank Burns. In early seasons she had several liaisons with visiting colonels or generals who were "old friends". She is an experienced surgical nurse, so although she thoroughly disapproves of the surgeons' off-duty tomfoolery, she can set her personal feelings aside to appreciate their skills, such as when she came down with appendicitis and asked that Hawkeye, not Burns, perform the surgery if needed.

Early on in the TV series, she was a stern "by-the-book" head nurse who nonetheless sometimes went against regulations for personal gain. In later years, she became a more relaxed and less criticizing member of the unit, tempering her authority with humanity. Key episodes in this development include the season 5 episode "The Nurses", in which she plays the role of a stern disciplinarian but breaks down in front of her nurses, revealing how hurt she is by their disdain for her; and "Comrades In Arms" (season 6), in which Hawkeye and Margaret make peace as they endure an artillery barrage together while lost in the wilderness, though they had also shown more mutual respect for one another before, when they have to go to a front-line aid station in "Aid Station" (season 3). She confesses to Klinger that she envies him for having a hometown – as an army brat she has moved around so much she could never make any friends. Drinking problems appear to run in her family. She once told Frank that half of her salary went to support her mother; half of that money went towards drying her out, the other half for bail money (her mother was a kleptomaniac). In one early episode, Houlihan herself was a hard drinker who drank a quart of brandy a day. Although the series presumes that she is an only child, in the same episode she tells Frank about her younger sister (a captain) who was engaged to be married. Although she projects a tough persona she is an emotionally lonely person who has had only four close friends in her adult life (one in college and three in nursing school). In one early episode ["Hot Lips and Empty Arms"] she is very angry at herself when she finds her college roommate has a dream marriage with a rich doctor, children, a great house, a swimming pool, and a washing machine – all of which could have been hers.

Her long-standing affair with Frank ends after she finally realizes that Burns has no intention of divorcing his wife to marry her; she does have an engagement and subsequent marriage to Lieutenant Colonel Donald Penobscott. The marriage does not last long; she later finds out a visiting nurse had had an affair with him. Though he promises to work things out with her, he has himself permanently transferred from Tokyo to San Francisco. She divorces him, regaining her self-confidence. In the wake of her split with Burns, she becomes more comfortable with at least some of the unit's more unorthodox ways and as time progresses, becomes a willing participant in some of the hijinks. Despite their long-running mutual antagonism, Hawkeye and Margaret came to develop respect and affection for each other, reflected in a long passionate farewell kiss in the final episode. She returns to the US to take a position in an Army hospital.

In the series of novels co-written with (or ghost-written by) William E. Butterworth, Houlihan reappears as the twice-widowed Margaret Houlihan Wachauf Wilson, both husbands having expired on the nuptial bed through excessive indulgence in her still-outstanding physical charms. Her career has taken a new direction as the head of the "God Is Love in All Forms Christian Church, Incorporated", a cult or sect with the unusual distinction that its entire congregation consists of gay men. Most of these are extremely flamboyant and the Reverend Mother herself is conspicuously glitzy and glittery. However, it appears that Margaret genuinely cares for her flock and is not merely shaking them down in pursuit of material gain.

=== Charles Emerson Winchester III, M.D. ===
Charles Emerson Winchester III
- M*A*S*H character
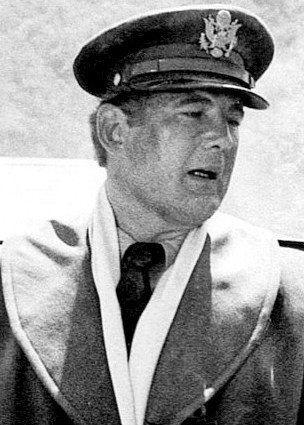
- First appearance: "Fade Out Fade In"
- Last appearance: "Goodbye, Farewell and Amen"
- Portrayed by: David Ogden Stiers

In-universe information
- Gender: Male
- Title: Major
- Family: Honoria Winchester (sister); Charles Winchester II (father)
- Hometown: Boston, Massachusetts

Major Charles Emerson Winchester III is a supporting character in the television series, played by David Ogden Stiers. The name Charles Emerson Winchester was derived from three real street names in the city of Boston. He was introduced in the show's sixth season as a replacement for Frank Burns, both in the unit's surgical team and as a foil for Hawkeye and B. J. Though Winchester embodied some antagonistic qualities similar to Burns's such as pompousness and formality, he proved during his time on the series to be a very different character than his predecessor, being far more intelligent, humane, kind, and skilled in surgery. Also, where Burns was always the fall guy and butt of Hawkeye's roasts, jokes, and insults, Winchester often was able to match wits with Hawkeye and even zinged him back, which Hawkeye seemed to actually respect. Winchester's suffix of "the third" was not present in the character's name until season 8.

Charles Winchester was born in his grandmother's house in the Boston, Massachusetts, neighborhood of Beacon Hill, and is part of a wealthy family of Republican Boston Brahmins. After finishing his secondary studies at Choate, he graduated summa cum laude class of 1943 from Harvard College (where he lettered in Crew and Polo), completed his M.D. at Harvard Medical in Boston in 1948 (graduating first in his class), and worked at Massachusetts General Hospital. Before he was drafted to join the US Army during the Korean War, he was on track to become chief of cardiothoracic surgery.

Winchester's commanding officer in Tokyo, Colonel Horace Baldwin (Robert Symonds), transferred him to the 4077th on temporary duty in retaliation for the major's gloating attitude about beating him at cribbage for $672.17 (equivalent to about $8,090–$8,990 in 2025, depending on when Winchester was drafted during the Korean War). After Burns ran amok in Seoul on leave and was promoted and transferred back to the United States, Colonel Potter successfully requested Winchester's transfer to the 4077th be made permanent.

Assigned to quarters in "the Swamp" with Hawkeye and B. J., Winchester found the conditions there appalling, calling the camp upon his arrival "an inflamed boil on the buttocks of the world." Keeping with the show's tradition of replacement characters who are in some way the antithesis of their predecessors, Winchester is as skilled a surgeon as Burns was inept – although he had to learn how to perform battlefield medicine, a.k.a. meatball surgery, to increase his efficiency with the large number of critical patients that typically arrived at one time. Winchester does adjust accordingly, although his skill as a surgeon inadvertently frustrates his hope of being transferred back to Tokyo since Colonel Potter considers him too valuable to lose. He is as cultured as Burns was lowbrow; in one episode during a verbal joust with Pierce and Hunnicutt, Winchester matches them true story for true story due to his cultured upbringing and skill, culminating in him revealing he even once dated actress Audrey Hepburn (producing a candid photograph of them as proof) to the astonishment and chagrin of B. J. and Hawkeye. However, Winchester still has to adjust to the realities of field medicine. Although the character was originally intended to develop a romance with Houlihan, the chemistry between the two was not there, so Charles and Margaret maintain a platonic, professional friendship. This showed through when Col. Baldwin came to the camp on an official visit and Winchester tried to curry his favor in hopes of being reassigned. However, when Baldwin mistook Major Houlihan as a prostitute Winchester procured for him and tried to sexually assault her, Baldwin offered to reassign Winchester if he supported his false accusation that Houlihan made advances on him. After much internal struggle, Winchester refused to cooperate and told Colonel Potter everything while finally giving Baldwin his true opinion of him as an insufferable superior, forcing him to leave in public humiliation while Winchester's comrades applauded his act of conscience.

Winchester is often adversarial with Hawkeye and B. J., but unlike Burns, he joins forces with them to achieve a common goal. He has a keen but dry sense of humor and enjoys practical jokes as well as the occasional prank to get revenge on his bunkmates for something they did, or for his own amusement. Behind his snobbery, he was raised with a sense of noblesse oblige and was capable of profound – albeit sometimes misguided – acts of kindness. For example, in "Death Takes a Holiday" he quietly gifts an orphanage with expensive chocolates (a tradition in his family) while the camp assails his stinginess because true charity must be anonymous. Initially outraged to find that they were traded on the black market, he learns the candy was sold to buy an entire month's worth of food for the orphans. As the orphanage director apologizes, Winchester reflects: "It is I who should be sorry. It is sadly inappropriate to give dessert to a child who has had no meal." Humbled, he retreats to the Swamp, where Klinger brings him a Christmas dinner made up of party leftovers, and they exchange quiet Christmas greetings, on a first-name basis. In "Morale Victory", he sends for a copy of the score for Ravel's Piano Concerto for the Left Hand to encourage a pianist who can no longer play with his injured right hand. In "Run for the Money", he stands up for a wounded soldier whose comrades and commanding officer mock his stuttering, encouraging the young man to live up to his intellectual potential. At the end of the episode, he listens to a recorded letter from his sister Honoria, who turns out to likewise be a stutterer.

Classical music is one of his great loves, helping him to maintain his morale. In the series finale, following the sudden death of the Chinese POWs he has been teaching a work by Mozart, Winchester states that music has transformed into a haunting reminder of the horrors of the war (David Ogden Stiers was the conductor in residence for the Newport Symphony Orchestra for a decade or more).

After the war ends and the 4077th is disestablished, he returned to Boston, where the position of Chief of Thoracic Surgery at a prestigious hospital awaits him.

=== Walter "Radar" O'Reilly ===
Walter "Radar" O'Reilly
- M*A*S*H character
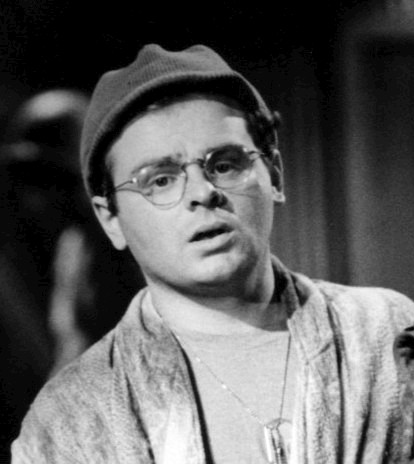
- First appearance: MASH: A Novel About Three Army Doctors
- Last appearance: W*A*L*T*E*R
- Portrayed by: Gary Burghoff

In-universe information
- Gender: Male
- Titles: Corporal; Second Lieutenant; Corporal-Captain
- Hometown: Ottumwa, Iowa

Corporal Walter Eugene "Radar" O'Reilly appears in the novels, film, and TV series. He also appeared in two episodes of AfterMASH, and starred in the television pilot W*A*L*T*E*R. The character was portrayed by Gary Burghoff in both the film and on television, the only regular character played by a single actor. His full name is never given in the original novel or film, but in the TV series it is Walter Eugene O'Reilly, "Walter" being picked by Burghoff himself. The later novels by Richard Hooker and William Butterworth give his name as J. Robespierre O'Reilly.

Radar is from Ottumwa, Iowa, and joined the army right out of high school. This is at odds with his later "graduating" from the Triple A High School Diploma Company of Delavan, Indiana. He has a brother who was rejected by the draft as 4F. He seems to have extra-sensory perception, appearing at his commander's side, with whatever paperwork is required, before being called, and finishing his sentences before the C.O. is anywhere near the end of them. He also has exceptionally good hearing, able to hear helicopters before anyone else and to tell from the rotor sounds if they are coming in loaded or not. It was these abilities that earned him the nickname "Radar". The character is inspired by company clerk Don Shaffer, who also was born in Ottumwa and nicknamed "Radar" by his compatriots, and who served alongside Hornberger in Korea.

In the film, Radar was portrayed as worldly and sneaky, a characterization that carried into the early part of the series. He carries with him a pocketful of passes for any potential scam that might arise and has a racket of selling tickets for spying through a peephole into the nurses' shower. Another time, he cons nearly every member of MASH 4077 into buying two-tone mail-order shoes. As was allegedly done a couple of times in World War II, he successfully mailed a jeep home, one piece at a time. He is known for his tremendous appetite for heaping portions of food, is not averse to drinking Henry Blake's brandy and smoking his cigars when the colonel is off-duty, and occasionally drinks the moonshine liquor Hawkeye and Trapper make in their still.

Soon after the pilot episode, Burghoff noted that the other characters were changing from the film portrayals and decided to follow. He and writer Larry Gelbart evolved Radar into a naïve farm boy, who still sleeps with his teddy bear and whose favorite beverage is Nehi brand grape soda. He has a virginal awkwardness with women despite having been engaged before reporting to the 4077th (his fiancée sent him a "Dear John" record) and a fondness for superhero comic books. In season 3, he remarked that he would be glad to live past age 18, though other ages are given in other episodes, and by then the actor was pushing 30. The show continued to portray him as very young even as his hairline receded (all of the actors would age a decade during this protracted retelling of a three-year war).

He runs the camp public address system and radio station, which are often used in minor gags; in one episode he transmits messages to a Navy carrier by Morse code. Another occasionally recurring gag is Radar's ineptitude with the bugle; he invariably mangles any calls he tries to play, almost never plays the correct call for the situation (e.g., playing Mess Call for Assembly), and his bugle has suffered abuse such as being shot out of his hand and thrown into a roaring bonfire.

Radar frequently looks to the doctors for advice, and increasingly regards Henry Blake and then Sherman Potter as father figures, having lost his elderly father at a young age. Radar is also one of the very few people Hawkeye Pierce has ever saluted (an event that occurred after Radar was wounded during a trip to Seoul and was given a Purple Heart, and again when he leaves to go home), showing just how much Pierce respects him. Radar is briefly promoted to Second Lieutenant as the result of a poker game debt, but soon returns to the ranks after discovering that life as a commissioned officer is more complicated than he had originally thought. Radar was also briefly "promoted" to the made-up rank of Corporal-Captain by Hawkeye in the two-part episode "Welcome to Korea".

Radar appeared in every episode of the show's first three seasons. After season five, doing the series had become a strain on the actor's family life, and he had his contract changed to limit his appearances to 13 episodes per season out of the usual 24. By season seven, Burghoff started experiencing burnout and decided it was time to quit; he finished season seven, then returned the next season for a two-part farewell episode titled "Good-Bye Radar" in which Radar was granted a hardship discharge after the death of his Uncle Ed to help on the family farm, which he accepted after being satisfied that Klinger could adequately replace him.

Radar left his teddy bear behind on Hawkeye's bunk as a parting gift and symbol of his maturity. (In the final regular episode of the series titled "As Time Goes By", Radar's teddy bear is put into the unit's time capsule to symbolize the soldiers who arrived as boys and left as men.)

He appears offscreen in the Season 9 episode "The Foresight Saga". Colonel Potter receives a letter from Radar in which he says all is going just fine in Ottumwa. A phone call to him, answered by Radar's mother, reveals the truth: the farm is not doing well; Radar cannot afford to hire help; and he has had to take a second job in order to meet the mortgage. The 4077th helps him by having Radar sponsor a Korean refugee who is a great farmer to go to America and work for him.

In 1984, Burghoff guest-starred in two episodes of AfterMASH as Radar, now living on the family farm in Iowa. These appearances led to W*A*L*T*E*R, a television pilot for a proposed spin-off series.

In the pilot (and proposed series), the O'Reilly family farm had failed and Radar had moved to St. Louis and become a police officer. Production never proceeded past the pilot, which aired once on CBS.

=== Father John Mulcahy ===
Father John Mulcahy
- M*A*S*H character
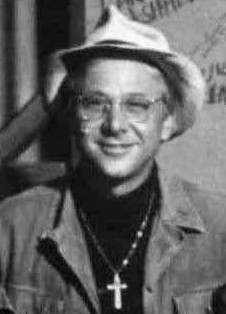
- First appearance: MASH: A Novel About Three Army Doctors
- Last appearance: "Saturday's Heroes" (AfterMASH)
- Portrayed by: Film: René Auberjonois; Television: William Christopher (George Morgan for the pilot)

In-universe information
- Gender: Male
- Titles: 1st Lieutenant; Captain
- Family: Kathy (sister)
- Hometown: Philadelphia, Pennsylvania

1st Lieutenant (later Captain) "Father" John Patrick Francis Mulcahy, SJ – the order of his given names was not presented consistently in the series – appears in the novel, film (played by René Auberjonois) and TV series (played by William Christopher except in the pilot where he is played by George Morgan). He is a Catholic priest and serves as a US Army chaplain assigned to the 4077th. He was played by George Morgan in the pilot episode of the series, but the producers decided that a quirkier individual was needed for the role.

In the novel and film, Mulcahy is familiarly known by the nickname "Dago Red", a derogatory reference to his Italian–Irish ancestry and the sacramental wine used during Holy Mass. While most of the staff is not religious, they treat Mulcahy with respect. It is Mulcahy who alerts the doctors that the camp dentist "Painless" is severely depressed. Afterward, Mulcahy reluctantly helps the doctors to stage the famous "Last Supper" faux suicide, to convince Painless that he should continue with life. He is bewildered by the doctors' amoral pranks and womanizing behavior, but is usually forgiving of their jokes and sarcastic remarks, commenting once that "humor, after all, was one of His creations". When Radar places a hidden microphone inside Hot Lips's tent as she and Frank Burns have sex, members of the camp listen in, and Mulcahy at first mistakes their conversation (and noises) for an episode of The Bickersons, leaving abruptly when he realizes otherwise.

He is from Philadelphia and is frequently seen wearing a Loyola sweatshirt. He has a sibling, Kathy, who is a Catholic nun. He impishly refers to her as "my sister the Sister". His sister's religious name has been variously stated as Maria Anglica or Theresa. He is an amateur boxer and boxing fan; an old priest and mentor in Jesuit school taught his students that boxing built character and Mulcahy coached boys in the sport at his local CYO chapter before being assigned to the 4077th. There is a running theme that Mulcahy always wins the betting pools and donates his winnings to the local orphanage. On one occasion when asked how he knows what bet to place, he looks to the sky with a smile. His luck at poker is unremarkable however.

Mulcahy understands that many of his "flock" are non-religious or have other faiths, and does not evangelize them overtly. Rather than lecturing from an authority, he seeks to teach by example ("Blood Brothers"), or by helping someone see the error of their ways ("Identity Crisis"). In the early part of the series he was a stock character of comic relief who usually talked about the Korean orphans taken care of by Catholic nuns. Although his quiet faith in God is unshakable, Mulcahy is often troubled over whether his role as chaplain and religious leader has importance compared to the doctors' obvious talent for saving lives. This is despite being told by Cardinal Reardon, a prelate visiting Korea to evaluate the effectiveness of the chaplains serving there, that "you're a tough act to follow" after listening to his sermon concerning a soldier diagnosed with leukemia, at that time a death sentence. This leads him to periodically prove himself, such as volunteering for a dangerous mission to demonstrate his courage to a soldier who had shot himself in the foot to get out of combat duty ("Mulcahy's War"), and putting himself in harm's way to retrieve or negotiate for medical supplies ("Tea and Empathy", "Out of Gas"). He is repeatedly passed over for promotion but eventually rises to the rank of Captain after Colonel Potter intercedes on his behalf ("Captains Outrageous"). Prior to his promotion, in an effort to prove he is worth as much as any of the surgeons or nurses, Chaplain Mulcahy volunteered to serve as the counterweight for an intrepid chopper pilot sent to pick up a soldier with a head wound who needs immediate surgery (the H-13 Sioux helicopters used by the Army could not fly safely unless both stretchers were loaded). Colonel Potter put him in for a commendation, most likely the Commendation Medal with Combat V for Valor. That may have had something to do with his finally receiving his captaincy.

Although he is ordained as a Catholic priest, Mulcahy demonstrates both an inclination towards Christian ecumenism and a studious interest in, and familiarity with other Christian denominations and also non-Christian faiths. This is demonstrated in his agreeing to perform Protestant church services for Colonel Potter ("Change of Command"), offering a prayer in Hebrew for a wounded Jewish soldier ("Cowboy"), and explaining the rituals of a Buddhist wedding to other attendees from the camp ("Ping Pong").

In the series finale, while releasing POWs from a holding pen in the path of an artillery barrage, he is nearly killed and loses most of his hearing when a shell explodes at close range. He tells his friends that he intends to work with the deaf following the war, but only B. J. knows why, and helps him conceal his hearing loss from them.

Father Mulcahy was one of three regular M*A*S*H characters to star in the spin-off AfterMASH, with William Christopher joining Harry Morgan and Jamie Farr. The show was set at the fictional General Pershing VA Hospital in Missouri, where he served as chaplain. An experimental procedure was said to have restored most of his hearing.

=== Maxwell Klinger ===
Maxwell Klinger
- M*A*S*H character
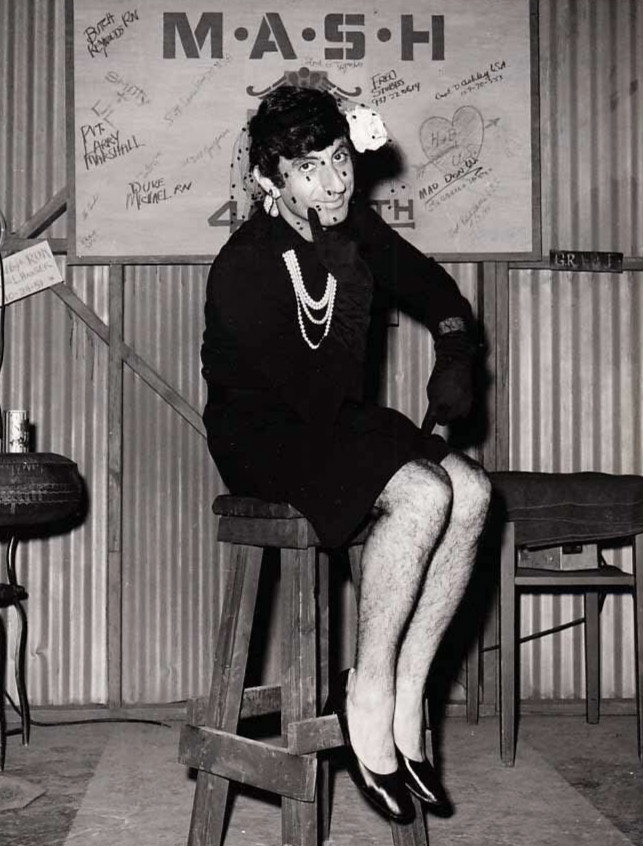
- First appearance: "Chief Surgeon Who?"
- Last appearance: "Saturday's Heroes" (AfterMASH)
- Portrayed by: Jamie Farr

In-universe information
- Gender: Male
- Titles: Corporal; Sergeant
- Spouses: Laverne Esposito (divorced); Soon Lee Han
- Children: Si Young Klinger (son; with Soon Lee)
- Hometown: Toledo, Ohio

Corporal (later Sergeant) Maxwell Q. "Max" Klinger appears in the television series M*A*S*H and the spin-off AfterMASH, played by actor Jamie Farr. He serves as an orderly, Sentry and later Company clerk assigned to the 4077th. Klinger was the first main character introduced on M*A*S*H not to have appeared in either the original novel or the subsequent film. Klinger is an Arab-American of Lebanese descent from Toledo, Ohio (like Farr himself). As for Klinger's religion, in an early show, Klinger said he gave up being an atheist for Lent. In real life, Jamie Farr is a devout Antiochian (Greek) Orthodox. In other episodes, Klinger pleads with Allah to help him out of a jam.

In the sixth-season episode "What's Up, Doc?", Klinger is indicated to be 30-years-old. While talking to Colonel Potter, Klinger insists that he needs a hardship discharge, due to him having nine children to support, and shows Potter photos of nine children. Potter points to one of Klinger's alleged children and remarks: "This kid has got to be at least 19. That would mean you were a father at 11."

The character's original defining characteristic was his continual attempts to gain a Section 8 psychiatric discharge from the Army, by habitually wearing women's clothing and engaging in other "crazy" stunts. His first appearance was in the fourth episode, "Chief Surgeon Who?"; in that episode's original script, Klinger was an effeminate gay man ("a silly fag character" as stated by Farr in the documentary Making M*A*S*H), but the writers later agreed that it would be more interesting to have Klinger be heterosexual, but wear dresses in an attempt to gain a Section 8 discharge. Among the characters Klinger has tried to dress up as include the Statue of Liberty, Moses, Zoltan King of the Gypsies, Cleopatra, Snow White, Dorothy from the Wizard of Oz, Scarlett O'Hara from Gone With the Wind; a ballerina, a US Army female nurse, a 1920s flapper, a nun, two Korean women, and a bride. He makes it a point to play up his antics to visiting high-ranking officers in an attempt to gain their sympathy and convince them that he is unfit to serve. When Colonel Potter takes command, Klinger immediately tries the same with him, but Potter sees through the scam immediately. Series writer Larry Gelbart stated during the M*A*S*H 30th Anniversary Reunion special that Klinger's antics were inspired by stories of Lenny Bruce attempting to dodge his military service by dressing himself as a US Navy WAVE.

Klinger eventually gives up his attempts at Section 8 when he is picked by Colonel Potter to become the new company clerk following Radar's discharge. He is later promoted to Sergeant ("Promotion Commotion") and begins to take his duties even more seriously; the writers had decided to "tap into his street skills" to flesh out his character. In the eighth-season episode "Dear Uncle Abdul", Klinger writes to his uncle – who successfully used cross-dressing to stay out of the Army – about the crazy goings-on in camp, ending with the reflection "It's no wonder I never got a Section Eight – there's nothing special about me; everybody here is crazy!" Klinger is a fan of the Toledo Mud Hens, an actual minor league baseball team, and occasionally voices his high opinion of the hot dogs at Tony Packo's, an actual Toledo restaurant. He also enjoys smoking "genuine" Cuban cigars made by Puerto Ricans in New Jersey.

In the third-season episode "Springtime", Klinger marries his girlfriend, Laverne Esposito, via radio. In season six, he receives a Dear John letter from Laverne saying she has found another man, whom she later breaks up with, then becoming engaged to Klinger's supposed best friend. When Colonel Potter denies his hardship authorization to go home to try to save his marriage, considering it another fake story, the frustrated Klinger tears his dress, shouting that his cross-dressing was fake. From then on, he wears his Army uniform more often (though still wears dresses frequently until Season Eight).

In the final episodes of the series, Klinger gets engaged to Soon Lee Han (Rosalind Chao), a Korean refugee; when proposing to her, he suggests she wear the wedding dress he had himself worn in one of his attempted Section Eight escapades and explains to her what white means in his culture. She refuses to leave Korea until she finds her family, leading to the irony that although the end of the war means Klinger is free to return to the US, he chooses to stay with her in Korea and aid in her search.

In AfterMASH, it is revealed that Max and Soon Lee found her family and helped them reestablish themselves as farmers, then moved together to the US to settle down. However, she faced racial discrimination and he turned to bookmaking, and is only able to escape prison time when Sherman Potter offers a character reference and hires him as his assistant at the veterans' hospital in Missouri where he now works.

=== Duke Forrest ===
Duke Forrest
- First appearance: MASH: A Novel About Three Army Doctors
- Last appearance: MASH
- Portrayed by: Tom Skerritt

In-universe information
- Gender: Male
- Title: Captain
- Hometown: Forrest City, Georgia

Captain Augustus Bedford "Duke" Forrest appears in the novel and the film (played by actor Tom Skerritt). In the book, Duke Forrest is described as under six feet (1.83 metres) tall, with red hair, blue eyes, and 29 years old. He is married with two daughters. As portrayed by Skerritt in the film, he stands at 6.1 feet (1.86 m) and is dark-haired. Skerritt was 37 years old at the time.

In both the novel and the film, he is a surgeon assigned to the 4077th, who arrives with Hawkeye. Hailing from the fictional small town of Forrest City, Georgia, Duke ends up sharing a tent with Hawkeye, Frank Burns, and Trapper John. In the film, following the departure of Frank Burns in a straitjacket, Duke carries on a more or less discreet affair with Hot Lips Houlihan (which began while Trapper John and Hawkeye were in Tokyo to operate on a Congressman's son) until he is rotated back to the States to be discharged from the Army.

In the film, when it is proposed that Oliver Harmon "Spearchucker" Jones will bunk with the other surgeons in the Swamp, Duke treats him with disrespect (implied to be because of his Southern heritage), until Hawkeye and Trapper rebuke him. Duke later comes to appreciate Spearchucker's skill as both a surgeon and a former professional football player.

The Duke Forrest character did not appear in the TV series. Skerritt reportedly turned down the offer from 20th Century Fox to reprise his role as Duke on the series because he doubted that a half-hour sitcom adaptation of the film would succeed. In the season 3 episode "Life with Father", Trapper mentions a former 4077th surgeon named Captain Forrest. Hawkeye adds that Forrest left the unit over two years earlier, and now has a toy store.

=== Lt. Nurse Kellye ===
1st Lt. Kealani "Kellye" (sometimes referred to as Lt. Nakahara or Lt. Yamato) was portrayed by Kellye Nakahara. She appeared in 86 episodes of the series, more episodes than some main characters, such as Henry Blake and Trapper John. The character grew steadily from a background (often non-speaking) character in the first season to a speaking character with a character arc of her own, culminating in the season 11 episode "Hey, Look Me Over" which was primarily about the character. Her name changed several times before it finally settled on "Nurse Kellye"; for example, she was referred to as "Nurse Able" in her first appearance in "A Full Rich Day". The first name "Kealani" was never spoken on screen, but according to interviews with the actress, that was the first name used on set when referring to the character. She is called "Lt. Nakahara" in the season 10 episode "The Birthday Girls", and in the last regular episode of season 11, the final episode filmed, "As Time Goes By", Major Houlihan calls Kellye "Lt. Nakahara".

Originally from Honolulu, she described herself as "part Chinese, part Hawaiian" in episode 11 of season 8 "Life Time", and speaks Japanese, as revealed in "Communication Breakdown", season 10 episode. She had great pride in her Asian American heritage and frequently took umbrage at racial slurs leveled by Frank Burns. A recurring theme in her appearances is that she is shown dancing in the Officer's Club with nearly every available man in the camp at one point or another. Her family lives in Honolulu according to her statements in the final episode.

Nakahara joined Morgan, Christopher, and Farr on AfterMASH, in which she was the off-camera voice of the public address system at the V.A. hospital.

== Recurring characters ==
=== Brig. Gen. Hammond ===
Hammond is a brigadier general who is in charge of several medical outfits, including the 4077th. In both the film and the TV series, Hammond is played by G. Wood, making him one of two actors to reprise his film role in the TV show. (Gary Burghoff is the other.)

In the book, the character's full name is Hamilton Hartington Hammond, and he is stationed in Seoul. In the movie, General Hammond's first name is Charles, and he is very enthusiastic about football, challenging the 4077th to a game against his 325th Evac unit. In the series pilot, it is clear that he is a surgeon as well as an administrator, and his first name is Hamilton. In "Henry Please Come Home" Hammond is personally responsible for Henry's short-lived transfer to Tokyo. In both the film and the series, Hammond has a cordial relationship with Col. Blake. In the film, Hammond is dismissive of Major Houlihan and her negative report about Blake, while in the TV series Houlihan is a sometime lover whom he remembers fondly.

=== Brig. Gen. Crandall Clayton ===
Clayton, who appears to have replaced Hammond, is in charge of several medical outfits including the 4077th. He once refers to Henry Blake as "a dear friend", though Blake always addresses him as "General". Clayton has somewhat less of a military bearing than Hammond, and seems to want to balance military expediency with "fatherly advice". He is played by Herb Voland.

=== Maj. Gen. Maynard M. Mitchell ===
A general who appears in a few early episodes. In the episode "The Incubator", and in this episode only, he is presented as a fool, answering questions of reporters in military double talk. In "Officers Only", he is the grateful father of a wounded soldier who arranges with Maj. Burns for the construction of an Officers' Club. Played by Robert F. Simon.

=== Colonel Samuel Flagg ===
Lieutenant Colonel (later Colonel) Samuel Flagg is played by Edward Winter. Flagg is an American intelligence agent who acts paranoid and irrational and appears to the staff of the 4077th Mobile Army Surgical Hospital to be mentally unstable. He alternately claims to be affiliated with the CIA, the CIC, or the CID. Other aliases include Major Brooks, Captain Louise Klein, Lieutenant Carter, Ensign Troy, and Chaplain Goldberg.

Flagg appears in six M*A*S*H episodes:

- "A Smattering of Intelligence",
- "Officer of the Day",
- White Gold,
- "Quo Vadis, Captain Chandler?",
- "The Abduction of Margaret Houlihan",
- "Rally 'Round the Flagg, Boys".
- Before playing Flagg, Winter played a similar character named Captain Halloran in the episode "Deal Me Out". However, most fans of the show claim this is actually Flagg's first appearance, with Halloran simply being one of Flagg's many aliases. This is supported by a comment made by Flagg to psychiatrist Sidney Freedman in "Quo Vadis, Captain Chandler?", who also appears in "Deal Me Out".

Flagg resurfaces a few years after the war, in a Hannibal, Missouri, courtroom (as seen in the AfterMASH episode "Trials").

=== Lt. Col. Donald Penobscott ===
Lieutenant Colonel Donald Penobscott was played by two actors, Beeson Carroll and former football player and Tarzan actor Mike Henry. Donald is introduced in name only at the start of the fifth season. Tall, dark, handsome, and muscular, he is a graduate of West Point whom Major Margaret "Hot Lips" Houlihan (Loretta Swit) meets while she is on leave in Tokyo. She falls in love with him on the spot, and he quickly asks her to marry him. Margaret promptly accepts, leading to a falling out with her former flame Frank Burns.

Penobscott is not seen until the season-ending episode "Margaret's Marriage", wherein Donald (played by Carroll) arrives to marry Margaret at the 4077th. Hawkeye and B. J. have a bachelor party for him, and after he passes out from drunkenness, the hosts, also inebriated, decide to play a joke on Penobscott by plastering him from his chest to his toes, intending to tell him that he had broken both his legs during the night. The cast is still on during the wedding ceremony, and he is unable to move without assistance. The wedding is cut short by incoming wounded, which leaves Donald in the mess hall, unable to move in his body cast. As Margaret leaves for her honeymoon, Hawkeye and B. J. make a halfhearted attempt to tell her that the cast could be removed, but she doesn't hear them over the sound of the helicopter in which they are departing.

He is not seen again until the sixth-season episode "The M*A*S*H Olympics", in which Donald (played this time by Henry) arrives to visit Margaret and ends up taking part in the 4077th's amateur Olympics competition; he almost wins a race against portly Sgt. First Class Ames, but Penobscott gets tangled in a camouflage net while showing off.

He is mentioned frequently throughout the sixth and seventh seasons, particularly about problems Margaret and Donald are having. For example, in the episode "In Love and War", a new nurse arrives at the 4077th. After saying she was recently involved with a colonel named Donald, Margaret comes to conclude he has cheated on her, and she flies into a rage against the nurse. In "Comrades in Arms", Margaret receives a letter from Donald that was meant for another woman – a letter that says unkind things about Margaret and hints at Donald having an affair with the other woman. Finally, in the season seven episode "Peace on Us", Margaret announces she's getting a divorce due to Donald arranging a transfer to San Francisco without telling her. Margaret receives her official divorce decree from Donald in the episode "Hot Lips is Back in Town".

=== Major Sidney Freedman ===
Major Sidney Theodore Freedman, played by Allan Arbus, is a psychiatrist summoned in cases of mental health problems. In the M*A*S*H 30th Anniversary Special that aired on Fox in 2002, Arbus was the only non-regular cast member to be featured on the special.

Freedman's first appearance was in the episode "Radar's Report", as Milton Freedman. He visited the camp to do a psychiatric evaluation of Klinger, who was aiming for a Section 8 discharge. After Freedman had finished the report, he quietly took Klinger in for an interview and told him that while Klinger was not mentally ill, he was willing to declare him a transvestite and a homosexual. These labels would not leave him, though; as Sidney put it: "From now on, you go through life on high heels." Klinger vociferously denied, "I ain't any of those things! I'm just crazy!" Klinger's discharge was dropped, and Freedman left the camp.

Freedman appears in 12 M*A*S*H episodes:

- "Radar's Report" (as Milton Freedman),
- "Deal Me Out", "O.R.",
- "Quo Vadis, Captain Chandler?",
- "Dear Sigmund",
- "Hawk's Nightmare",
- "War of Nerves" (in which he qualified for a Purple Heart by being wounded while performing therapy follow-up on one of his patients),
- "The Billfold Syndrome",
- "Goodbye, Cruel World",
- "Bless You, Hawkeye",
- "Pressure Points", and the series finale,
- "Goodbye, Farewell and Amen".
- He is also mentioned, but does not appear onscreen, in the episodes "Mad Dogs and Servicemen", "Heal Thyself", "A Holy Mess", and "Trick or Treatment".

Freedman had to scrub in for surgery in the "O.R." episode. In this episode Freedman told those gathered in the operating room: "Ladies and gentlemen, take my advice: Pull down your pants and slide on the ice." He repeated that advice in the series finale, following his treatment of Hawkeye, who had finally cracked under the strain of the war. Freedman led Hawkeye to stop suppressing the memory of seeing a Korean mother smothering her crying baby to keep it silent, so a North Korean patrol would not find and kill or capture their group. He convinced a reluctant Hawkeye that the best thing for him now was to return to duty for the last days of the war.

After leaving Korea and the army, Freedman accepts a post at the University of Chicago. The AfterMASH episode "Madness to His Method" has as its frame Colonel Potter writing a letter in Missouri about the episode's situation to an unseen Freedman.

=== Capt. Spearchucker Jones ===
Captain Oliver Harmon "Spearchucker" Jones is a character who appears in the novel MASH (and its sequels), and was portrayed by Fred Williamson in the movie and Timothy Brown in the television series. In all iterations, the Spearchucker character is a superior surgeon who was also a stand-out collegiate athlete. "Spearchucker", a common racial slur, is said to refer in this case to his javelin-throwing prowess. Initially, he is transferred to the 4077th to help them win a football game (Jones is said to have played with the NFL's San Francisco 49ers) against the 321st Evac Hospital. In the novel, it is related that while a poorly paid resident, he had been scouted by the Philadelphia Eagles playing semi-professional football in New Jersey for extra cash, and had been signed by the Eagles, playing with them until he was drafted. Coincidentally, actor Timothy Brown played most of his nine-year NFL career with Philadelphia and was selected to the team's Hall of Fame in 1990.

It is established in the novel that Jones is from Duke Forrest's hometown of Forest Park, Georgia, and knew Duke's father. Duke makes racist comments about Jones, causing Hawkeye and Trapper to punish Duke. In the sequel novels, particularly M*A*S*H Goes to Maine, Jones joins the other doctors in their practice in Spruce Harbor, Maine, becoming a highly successful doctor and prominent citizen.

The character's middle name was Harmon in the film and Wendell in the novels. He is a board-certified neurosurgeon in the film, and in Episode 1/04, "Chief Surgeon Who?" in which Hawkeye is named Chief Surgeon of the 4077th, Spearchucker's specialty is indicated as he struggles to do other types of surgery. When he asks Hawkeye for help, he says, "Anything outside the skull, I'm dead."

Spearchucker was shown during several episodes during the first season of the series. His full name was never mentioned in the series. He was one of the original Swampmen with Trapper, Hawkeye, and Frank Burns, and was the sole black surgeon at the 4077th. In the pilot episode, to raise funds for Ho-Jon's education, Trapper "jokingly" suggests selling Spearchucker. During his brief run on the show, it was implied that he and nurse Ginger Bayliss (played by Odessa Cleveland) were romantically involved.

Spearchucker's role was limited. It is implied he assisted Hawkeye and Trapper in their schemes on the sidelines. The producers decided to drop the character after the first few episodes, reasoning that they wouldn't be able to write enough meaningful episodes for Spearchucker if they were concentrating on Hawkeye and Trapper. Some accounts assert the producers were unable to find evidence for black Army surgeons in Korea; there were, however, several black surgeons who served in the US military at the time.

=== Capt. Ugly John Black ===
Captain "Ugly" John Black was portrayed by Carl Gottlieb in the movie, and John Orchard in the TV series. The character on the television show was an anesthesiologist from Australia, often depicted wearing an Australian slouch hat. In the book, he was an American who had "trained in the States with McIntyre". In the film, he is an American (as he can be seen wearing the insignia of a US Army Captain), but his background is not discussed. In the TV series, Ugly John was present only in the first season. He began as a significant supporting member of the cast, often engaged in poker games with Hawkeye and Trapper, but by the end of the season, he was rarely seen outside brief O.R. scenes.

Ugly John was never seen living in "The Swamp" and there was no fifth bunk, though it was the only quarters for subordinate male officers ever seen. In the episode "Sometimes You Hear the Bullet", Hawkeye says that he shares a tent with three other doctors. The script was likely written before Spearchucker was dropped and the writers presumably overlooked editing that line of dialogue. However, Ugly John was still a recurring character, and may have been one of the "three other doctors". John Orchard later returned to the show for the Season 8 episode "Captains Outrageous", this time playing a drunken and corrupt Australian Military Policeman "Sgt. Muldoon".

=== Lt. Ginger Bayliss ===
Played by Odessa Cleveland on the TV series, Ginger is one of few nurses to have a recurring, speaking role in the series as the same character. Ginger appears to be a competent nurse who is well-liked by the medical staff but occasionally runs afoul of Frank Burns who blames her for his mistakes, leading to Hawkeye and Trapper coming to her defense by pulling pranks on Frank.

Ginger is a Regular Army Lieutenant but is not a stickler for rules or military discipline like Major Houlihan. She is frequently seen fraternizing with Trapper and Spearchucker, even playing a game of "strip dominoes" with the latter in the first-season episode, "Chief Surgeon Who?".

In the first-season episode "Major Fred C. Dobbs", Ginger is working with Frank in the O.R. When Frank botches his work, he blames Ginger and tells Maj. Houlihan that Ginger is, "an incompetent bungler. I never want her at my table again!" Ginger is brought to tears by Frank's verbal assault prompting Hawkeye and Trapper to encase Frank's right arm in plaster capped with a metal retractor while Frank is sleeping.

One of Ginger's most prominent roles comes in the season 2 episode, "Dear Dad ... Three" where a wounded soldier requests that he be given blood only from white donors. Hawkeye and Trapper decide to teach him a lesson by tinting his skin darker while he is sedated and subsequently referring to him as "boy" and bringing him fried chicken and watermelon to eat. When Ginger is doing her rounds in post-op, she looks at his chart and says, "They've got you down as white. Good job, baby!" When he angrily lashes out at her, she pulls rank on him, warning: "I'm a lieutenant, soldier. I don't care if you are passing, watch your mouth." Later, when Trapper and Hawkeye explain to the soldier that all blood is the same, he reflects upon his behavior. As he prepares to depart the 4077th to rejoin his unit, he thanks the doctors then turns and salutes Ginger, who returns the salute and wishes him well.

Ginger's last appearance was in the season 4 episode, "The Late Captain Pierce". All told, Cleveland appeared in 25 episodes of M*A*S*H spanning seasons 1–4.

=== Lt. Peggy Bigelow ===
Lt. Peggy Bigelow was played by Enid Kent, appearing in seasons five through seven, then returning for two episodes (including the finale) for season eleven. She first appears in the fifth-season episode "Out of Sight, Out of Mind." In the season six episode "In Love and War", Bigelow gives her first name as "Peggy". In another season six episode, "Images", Bigelow mentions that she used to be an E.R. nurse in Chicago. However, Bigelow is not originally from Chicago, as she mentions that she is from Beaver Falls, Pennsylvania, in the season seven episode "Hot Lips is Back in Town". In many episodes, for instance the season seven episode "They Call the Wind Korea", Bigelow is shown to have a flirtatious relationship with Hawkeye.

Bigelow is absent in seasons 8–10, but returns in the season eleven episode "Who Knew?". She also appears in "Goodbye, Farewell and Amen", where the various characters talk about what they will do now that the war is over. Bigelow instead mentions that she had been a nurse at the tail-end of World War II. Between that, and her service in Korea, Bigelow indicates that she suffers from burnout. Her post-war plans and life are left unsaid in the episode.

=== Lt. Dish ===
1st Lieutenant Maria "Dish" Schneider was played by Jo Ann Pflug in the film and (as Lt. Maggie Dish) by Karen Philipp in the series. She was a nurse at the 4077th MASH during the Korean War.

Dish's role in the finished film was limited, as a large portion of her role did not make the final cut. The same thing happened to the character in the television series. After being prominently featured as Hawkeye's love interest in the pilot, she appeared in only one further episode (Episode 1/11) before leaving the show entirely. However, she continued to be featured in the opening credit montage sequence (wherein the MASH staff runs toward approaching helicopters) for most of the show's run.

=== Lt. Nancy Griffin ===
Nurse Griffin was played by Lynnette Mettey and appeared in three episodes during the first season as one of Hawkeye's romantic partners. She also appeared in three other episodes portraying other characters.

=== Lt. Margie Cutler ===
A nurse introduced as a new transfer in the episode "Requiem for a Lightweight". She immediately attracts the attention of both Hawkeye and Trapper, so much so that Maj. Houlihan wants her transferred again immediately. In the same episode, Trapper agrees to participate in a boxing match with a fighter from another outfit in exchange for a promise by Henry Blake that Cutler will be kept at the 4077th. Despite Trapper's efforts, however, she becomes romantically linked with Hawkeye in a few episodes. Cutler was played by actress/singer Marcia Strassman.

=== Lt. Leslie Scorch ===
A nurse at the 4077th, and Henry Blake's paramour during much of the first season, and is at his side through much of the pilot. She is good-natured and has a bubbly personality. Played by Linda Meiklejohn.

=== Lt. Barbara Bannerman ===
A nurse at the 4077th, who at times casually dates both Hawkeye and Trapper. Played by Bonnie Jones, at that time the wife of M*A*S*H producer Gene Reynolds. Seen only during season one.

=== Staff Sergeant Luther Rizzo ===
Staff Sergeant Luther Wilson Rizzo was played by G. W. Bailey. In the show, he was the sergeant in charge of the motor pool. While originally written to be from New York City, when the producers heard Bailey's southern accent in his first dailies his character was moved to Louisiana. He was known for his slow, deep, Louisiana drawl (Bailey himself is in fact Texan) and his slightly disheveled look. Though the motor pool seemed to function well, it did so despite Rizzo's casual work style and frequent naps. His philosophy on success in the army was that it was possible to never do work, so long as your superiors don't see you enjoy yourself: "Where else [but the Army] can you be a bum and get paid for it?"

In the Season 10 episode "Promotion Commotion", Rizzo was one of three 4077th enlisted who appeared before a promotion board consisting of Hawkeye, B. J., and Winchester. He was not promoted, but made it clear that he was American "with an American wife and American son, Billy Bubba". In Episode 10/21 his first name is given as "Wilson".

Rizzo enjoys shooting craps and seems to win more than he loses. He also is the camp loan shark, getting Charles on his hook at one point to the extent he had to have money sent from home to clear his debt with the cigar-chewing sergeant.

Sergeant Rizzo is known to carry a grudge. On one occasion, he borrowed a dummy hand grenade from Igor and used it to scare B. J. out of the shower after giving him a hard time. When Rizzo was found out, Charles played a prank and as Rizzo threw the grenade in the Swamp, Charles dove onto the inactive grenade stunning Rizzo. He had harsh words with Winchester when the latter, acting as motor pool officer, required him to completely disassemble a jeep's engine and lay it out on white sheets, for no good reason that Rizzo could see.

In the series finale, at the 4077th's final dinner Rizzo claimed that he would be going home to work on a new moneymaking venture: breeding frogs to sell to French restaurants. However, this was a minor error as Rizzo had re-enlisted in the Army in a previous episode. He is last seen driving Major Charles Emerson Winchester III in a military garbage dump truck away from the 4077th unit in the series finale.

=== Staff Sergeant Zelmo Zale ===
Staff Sergeant Zelmo Zale was portrayed by Johnny Haymer. Zale is the supply sergeant for the 4077th MASH and also is the camp's electrician; he is shown trying to keep the camp's generator going until it blows up. He is responsible for repairing the jukebox in the officers' club after the Marines bust it up. In the episode "Patent 4077", Zale describes himself as a master craftsman. He mentions in one episode that he is from Brooklyn. He makes his first appearance in the Season 2 episode, "For Want of a Boot", and his final appearance in the Season 8 episode, "Good-Bye Radar" (which also marked Gary Burghoff's last appearance on the show as Corporal Radar O'Reilly). Zale's name is mentioned for the final time in "Yes Sir, That's Our Baby". A running gag is his feud with Corporal Maxwell Klinger – once Klinger hit Zale for insulting the Toledo Mud Hens and is put on KP for a whole month. Another time Major Burns manipulates Klinger and Zale into a boxing match, which results in Burns being knocked out by both men.

=== Sgt. "Sparky" Pryor ===
Sparky is the mostly unseen telephone/radio operator at headquarters. His nickname is probably a carry-over from the days of telegraphy. Radar almost always needs to go through Sparky when he makes a call to Seoul, Japan, or the US. (Sparky seems to be at his desk around the clock). Sometimes, for special calls, Sparky requires a bribe to arrange the connection. The character is seen and heard only once, in the first-season episode "Tuttle". This is also the only time his rank and real name are mentioned. He is portrayed by Dennis Fimple, who plays him with a noticeable Southern US accent.

=== Ho-Jon ===
Ho-Jon was portrayed by Kim Atwood in the film, and Patrick Adiarte in the series. In the original novel, Ho-Jon is described as a 17-year-old Korean, tall, thin, bright, Christian, and living in Seoul. He was drafted into the South Korean army, subsequently, wounded and sent back to the 4077th for treatment. After rehabilitation, he resumes his position as "Swampboy". The Swampmen, who are very fond of Ho-Jon, arrange to have him sent to Hawkeye's old college in the US. To raise funds, Trapper grows a beard, poses as Jesus Christ (complete with a cross mounted on a jeep or hanging from a helicopter), and autographs thousands of photos which the Swampmen sell for a dollar apiece. In M*A*S*H Goes to Maine, Ho-Jon is briefly seen again, having pursued a successful career in university administration. In M*A*S*H Mania, he is shown to have become the director of admissions at Androscoggin College (Hawkeye's alma mater).

In the film, Ho-Jon is drafted, and Hawkeye drives him to the induction center. The Korean doctor who examines Ho-Jon discovers that Hawkeye has given him drugs to induce hypertension and tachycardia (so that he will fail the induction physical). Ho-Jon is last seen in the film being led away by South Korean soldiers while the doctor tells Hawkeye that he has seen through the trick.

In the screenplay, Ho-Jon is wounded and sent to the 4077th; however, his surgery is unsuccessful, and he dies. The completed film omits this storyline, although a scene showing Ho-Jon in the operating room remains with overdubbed dialogue (Houlihan: "That man's a prisoner of war, Doctor." Trapper: "So are you, Sweetheart, but you don't know it.") and a scene showing a jeep driving off with the deceased Ho-Jon, causing a brief pause in the poker game.

In the pilot episode, Ho-Jon is accepted at Hawkeye's old college, just as in the novel. In the TV version, the doctors raise funds for him by raffling off a weekend pass to Tokyo with Nurse Dish.

In the episode "I Hate a Mystery", Ho-Jon steals many valuable items and Hawkeye's poker winnings to bribe the border guards to bring his family down from the North. This contrasts with an incident in the pilot where he receives his college acceptance letter and leaves to tell his parents, who presumably live nearby.

=== Pvt. Igor Straminsky ===
Private Igor Straminsky was generally portrayed by actor Jeff Maxwell, although Peter Riegert played him in two sixth-season episodes. The character of Igor (by name) debuted in the second season and appeared sporadically until the series finale. Igor was seen in 48 episodes, the second most frequent recurring character after Nurse Kellye (portrayed by Kellye Nakahara) who appeared in 167 episodes.

Igor's role is generally comic relief. He is usually seen serving food in the mess tent and also serving as the foil for the frequent complaints about the unappetizing state of the food. He is also sometimes tasked with duties with Radar, as seen in the season 5 episode "Mulcahy's War".

In "Promotion Commotion", Igor relentlessly tries to impress Hawkeye and B. J., so he can be promoted to Corporal. He once mentioned to Father Mulcahy that he sets aside three dollars from each salary payment for the local orphanage.

In "The Price of Tomato Juice", Igor identifies himself as "Maxwell".

Igor became a favorite with both the fan base and the network. In later seasons, his roles were expanding, making him more of a recurring cast member.

His name is a play on the name of the Russian classical music composer, Igor Stravinsky.

Maxwell himself was primarily on set every day as the stand in for Alan Alda, performing this task for the duration of the series.

=== Pvt. Lorenzo Boone ===
A hospital orderly who is innocent and not especially bright. In the movie, he is played by Bud Cort, and Boone's humiliation at the hands of Maj. Burns leads to Trapper striking Burns later that day. In the TV series, he is first played by Bruno Kirby, though only in the pilot (in which he has no lines, is not spoken to, and is only visible in the background of a few shots), although he is seen in the opening credits for the duration of the series as the soldier who stumbles on the way up the hill to the helicopter pad. The character of "Boone" appears in a handful of episodes as a very minor character, played by Bob Gooden.

=== Roy Goldman ===
Roy Goldman (portrayed by and named after actor Roy Goldman) is a medic who is assigned various duties at the 4077th. His name was not set for several seasons. In "Officer of the Day", while with another soldier, he is referred to as either Carter or Willis (it is not clear which of the two is which). He is also referred to in one episode, perhaps jokingly, as Fred. Later the name "Goldman" was firmly established as his own. He is first called "Roy" by Corporal Max Klinger in "The Trial of Henry Blake" while appearing as an MP. He is usually seen in a non-medical setting (such as guard duty), though he also does chores within the hospital.

Goldman appears off and on throughout the run of the series, usually when a soldier is needed for a random line or reaction. When Hawkeye walks into the mess tent naked, for example, Goldman is the first one to notice, dropping his metal tray in shock. He rarely has more than one or two lines, though in the episode "The Red/White Blues", his reaction to a medication is an important plot point and he speaks quite a bit more.

The actor himself not only served as an extra and the "Roy Goldman" character, but was primarily on-set for the duration of the series as the stand in for Gary Burghoff, as they had similar stature and skin tone.

=== Dennis Troy ===
Like Roy, he is a corpsman. He is sometimes seen together with Roy, and sometimes he is a jeep driver. Dennis has glasses and straight, light hair, and usually has a mustache. Dennis rarely speaks, and never beyond a few words. In one episode, "Officer of the Day", he appears with another soldier and his last name is said to be Carter or Willis (it is unclear who is being referred to). One of those names, however, applies to Roy Goldman (see above), thus one can assume that the name was merely a one-time usage.

Perhaps because his appearances are so fleeting, the production staff may have been felt that Troy could be seen without distraction to the audience in settings other than the 4077th. In the episodes "For the Good of the Outfit" and "Dr. Pierce and Mr. Hyde", Dennis is General Clayton's jeep driver. In "Bombshells", he is an ambulance driver for the 8063rd MASH and does not seem to recognize B. J. Hunnicutt.

The actor himself not only served as an extra and the "Dennis Troy" character, but was primarily on-set for the duration of the series as the stand in for McLean Stevenson, Wayne Rogers, then Mike Farrell, and Larry Linville, as they had similar stature and skin tone.

=== Pvt. Frank Daley/Daily ===
An African American private with a mustache who is occasionally seen in group shots in early seasons. His name is only mentioned in the episode "Payday", though Hawkeye jokingly introduces him as his "brother-in-law Leroy" at the Officer's Club.

=== PA Announcer ===
The announcer on the public address system is heard throughout the film and in most episodes of the series. For the film, the voice is sometimes listed as that of Marvin Miller and sometimes as that of David Arkin, who played Staff Sergeant Vollmer. (The absence of Miller's considerable baritone resonance would suggest the latter.) There were a few different voices in the series, among them Todd Susman's and Sal Viscuso's as well as Jamie Farr, marking Corporal Klinger's arrival from the first episode, albeit unseen. In the series, it is unknown where on the base the PA announcer is posted, as Radar is the only one seen in control of the radio and PA system. In the episode "A Full Rich Day", Blake says, "Tony, hit it", cueing the national anthem of Luxembourg over the PA – Tony could have been the name of the announcer starting a record or the name of a "live" pianist.

=== Capt. Spaulding ===
Capt. Calvin Spaulding, played by Loudon Wainwright III, is a guitar-playing and singing surgeon who appeared in three episodes in season three (1974–75), "Rainbow Bridge", "There is Nothing Like a Nurse", and "Big Mac". The character's name is a reference to the character "Captain Spaulding" played by Groucho Marx in the film Animal Crackers.

== See also ==
- List of M*A*S*H cast members
- List of M*A*S*H episodes
