= List of M*A*S*H novels =

1969 Canadian paperback edition of the first book.

The M*A*S*H book series includes the original novel that inspired the movie and then the TV series. The first, MASH: A Novel About Three Army Doctors, was co-authored by H. Richard Hornberger (himself a former military surgeon) and W. C. Heinz (a former World War II war correspondent); it was published in 1968 under the pen name Richard Hooker. It told the story of a U.S. Mobile Army Surgical Hospital in Korea during the Korean War. In 1972, Hornberger (writing again as Hooker) published the sequel M*A*S*H Goes to Maine, covering the lives of the surgeons after they returned home from the war.

Following the success of the 1970 film M*A*S*H, publisher William Morrow and Company encouraged Hornberger to write a sequel. In 1972, the book M*A*S*H Goes to Maine was published, in which the characters Hawkeye, Trapper John, and Duke leave the military and practice medicine in Maine, where Hornberger himself had a private practice.

With the success of the M*A*S*H TV series, a further 12 "M*A*S*H Goes to ______" novels were published by Pocket Books. Although credited to Hooker and William E. Butterworth, they were essentially written by Butterworth alone. The sequel novels added many additional characters, mostly satiric caricatures of public figures from the 1970s: for instance, operatic tenor Luciano Pavarotti is parodied in the form of a singer named "Korsky-Rimsakov", and news anchor Dan Rather becomes the egotistical "Don Rhotten". The tone of the Butterworth novels is also markedly different from Hooker's original books, being much more broadly comical, less darkly satirical, and unrealistic. The "Butterworth" series concluded with M*A*S*H Goes to Montreal (1977).

In 1977, a final novel written by Hornberger was published. Titled M*A*S*H Mania, it picks up where M*A*S*H Goes to Maine left off, depicting the original characters in middle age, ignoring the intervening novels. Historiographer John Strausbaugh has called it "a bitter refutation of the goody two-shoes Alda vehicle".

== Series ==
=== by Richard Hooker ===
- MASH: A Novel About Three Army Doctors (1968)
- M*A*S*H Goes to Maine (1972)
- M*A*S*H Mania (1977)

=== by Richard Hooker and William E. Butterworth ===
- M*A*S*H Goes to New Orleans (1974)
- M*A*S*H Goes to Paris (1974)
- M*A*S*H Goes to London (1975)
- M*A*S*H Goes to Vienna (1976)
- M*A*S*H Goes to San Francisco (1976)
- M*A*S*H Goes to Morocco (1976)
- M*A*S*H Goes to Miami (1976)
- M*A*S*H Goes to Las Vegas (1976)
- M*A*S*H Goes to Hollywood (1976)
- M*A*S*H Goes to Texas (1977)
- M*A*S*H Goes to Moscow (1977)
- M*A*S*H Goes to Montreal (1977)
