= Abyssinia, Henry =

- M*A*S*H episode
- Episode no.: Season 3 Episode 24
- Directed by: Larry Gelbart
- Written by: Everett Greenbaum; Jim Fritzell
- Production code: B324
- Original air date: March 18, 1975

Guest appearances
- Jamie Farr as Klinger; William Christopher as Father Mulcahy

Episode chronology
← Previous "White Gold"	Next → "Welcome to Korea"
- M*A*S*H season 3

"Abyssinia, Henry" is the 72nd episode of the American television series M*A*S*H and the final episode of its third season. Written by Everett Greenbaum and Jim Fritzell, and directed by series creator Larry Gelbart, it first aired on March 18, 1975. The episode is notable for its shocking ending, in which the 4077th Mobile Army Surgical Hospital's amiable commanding officer, Lieutenant Colonel Henry Blake (played by McLean Stevenson), receives an honorable discharge and leaves for home but, in the final scene, is reported to be killed by enemy fire. This ending prompted more than 1,000 letters to series producers Gene Reynolds and Larry Gelbart, and drew criticism from both CBS and 20th Century Fox.

After the production of this episode, both Stevenson and Wayne Rogers, who played Captain Trapper John McIntyre, left the series to pursue other interests. While Stevenson's departure was announced prior to and written into "Abyssinia, Henry", Rogers unexpectedly left the series during the break between seasons, and so his character's departure takes place off-screen in the following episode, "Welcome to Korea", the first of the show's fourth season. These combined departures and their subsequent cast replacements also signaled the beginning of a shift in focus for the series as a whole, more centered on the character Hawkeye Pierce, played by Alan Alda, and with stories and tone increasingly from the dramatic side of comedy drama.

== Plot ==
During a shift in the operating room, Radar O'Reilly (Gary Burghoff) enters and informs Henry Blake that Blake has received all of the needed Army service points to be discharged and sent home. Henry begins planning his return and places a telephone call to Bloomington, Illinois, to inform his wife and family of the good news.

Majors Margaret Houlihan (Loretta Swit) and Frank Burns (Larry Linville) celebrate privately, believing that Frank will become the 4077th's new commander. Henry and Radar share a sentimental moment in which Radar describes Henry as a father figure, and gives Henry an inscribed Winchester cartridge; a surprised Henry returns the favor by spontaneously giving Radar a rectal thermometer that once belonged to his father. On the night before Henry's departure, Hawkeye Pierce (Alan Alda), Trapper John McIntyre (Wayne Rogers), and Radar throw a drunken going-away party for Henry at Rosie's Bar and Grill, and present him with a tailored civilian suit as a parting gift.

The next morning, Frank attempts to assemble the company for a formal send-off, but Hawkeye and Trapper are out of uniform and unshaven, and Corporal Klinger (Jamie Farr) wears a particularly elaborate dress made specially for the occasion. Henry arrives in his new suit, and Frank and Margaret give Blake a formal salute, but Henry chides Frank for being too much of a martinet. Henry's affectionate individual goodbyes to the others are cut short by the imminent arrival of his helicopter, but Hawkeye pulls him aside and persuades him to give a long parting kiss to Margaret, to her surprise and Frank's annoyance.

The staff follow Henry to the helicopter pad, where his chopper is carrying a wounded soldier that Henry tries to care for before the other doctors nudge him aside. Henry spots an emotional Radar saluting him and approaches to return the salute and hug him, before boarding and flying away.

Later, a visibly shaken Radar enters the operating room during another busy surgical shift. Trapper and Hawkeye make joking comments, but Radar delivers bad news: the plane carrying Henry home has been shot down over the Sea of Japan with no survivors. The stunned staff members struggle to retain their composure and proceed with their work as he leaves.

The episode ends with a light-hearted montage of clips from Henry's scenes over the past three seasons as a farewell to the character.

== Production ==
We didn't want Henry Blake going back to Bloomington, Illinois and going back to the country club and the brown and white shoes, because a lot of guys didn't get back to Bloomington.

— Gene Reynolds

The final scene, in which Radar informs the 4077th of the death of Henry Blake, was unprecedented: it was the first time in American television history that a main character departing a comedy series was killed off in a tragic way. When Stevenson decided to leave the series partway through the third season, producers Gene Reynolds and Larry Gelbart decided to make a statement regarding the unexpectancies and horror of war, especially with the Vietnam War fresh in viewers' minds.

To evoke genuine emotions of shock and sadness, and to ensure the performances for the majority of the episode were not influenced by the actors' knowledge of Blake's fate, the final O.R. scene was kept a secret from the cast (excepting Alan Alda) until immediately before filming; only then did Gelbart hand out the last page of the script. As a result, Stevenson was still on the set and saw the final scene being filmed. After shooting was completed, a season-ending cast party was planned. Stevenson left the set almost immediately after the end of filming, and the party was canceled due to the dour mood of the cast. Stevenson later said in an interview that he was deeply hurt that his character's death was revealed in this fashion and the party was "ruined". Gelbart later said of the event, "I wish we could say to him, 'We didn't mean it, Mac.'"

The title of the episode refers to the 1920s–1930s slang use of "Abyssinia" for "goodbye". ("Abyssinia", an old term for Ethiopia, pronounced /ˌæbɪˈsɪniə/, can be understood as "I'll be seeing you".)

== Reaction and impact ==
...if we turned on the [television] set we would see fifteen people [killed in Vietnam every night]. They don't complain about that because it is unfelt violence, it is unfelt trauma. And that's not good. I think that if there is such a thing as the loss of life there should be some connection. And we did make a connection. It was a surprise, it was somebody they loved. They didn't expect it but it made the point. People like Henry Blake are lost in war.

— Gene Reynolds

Certain journalists revealed Blake's fate in the weeks leading up to the episode's broadcast. Gary Deeb of the Chicago Tribune, for instance, revealed Blake's death nearly two months before the episode aired. Still, shortly after the episode originally aired, the reactions and feedback of viewers were intense, both in support and condemnation of the events of the episode. It is estimated that over 1,000 letters were received by the producers regarding the episode; "some ... were from people who understood. Many were from people that didn't." Many who objected also cited the fact that M*A*S*H was considered a situation comedy, and that Blake's "cheap" killing did not belong in the show; one caller to Reynolds stated after the episode aired that they "don't know why [they] did it; it's not necessary, it's just a little comedy show" and that "you've upset everybody [in the family]", before vowing never to watch the show again. Another, more lighthearted response to the episode came from an unhappy viewer in Lubbock, Texas, who sent a telegram stating that "Henry Blake has been found in a raft in Lake Lubbock."

Initially, Gelbart and Reynolds hand-wrote letters in response to the feedback. One such letter, written by Gelbart in response to an irate viewer and dated April 3 1975, reads,

I respect your reaction to the episode of March 18th –

We feel that Henry Blake's death was consistent with the series' philosophy regarding the utter wastefulness of war –

Many, far too many, men, women + children simply do not walk – or fly-away from it to live happily, if at all, ever after –

Eventually, due to the overwhelming number of letters, a form response was created explaining the rationale of their decisions. Negative reactions were not exclusive to the home viewers of the program: both CBS, the network that aired M*A*S*H, and 20th Century Fox, the company that produced M*A*S*H, expressed their unhappiness at the killing of Henry Blake. In fact, CBS's distaste with the episode was so great that during a later rerun of the episode, the final O.R. scene was cut from the episode. The final scenes have always been shown in syndication, and they were uncut on the DVD release of the series' third season in 2003.

Not all reaction to the airing was negative. On an episode of the variety series Cher that aired shortly afterward and featured Stevenson as a guest, the situation was parodied when the episode opened to a studio shot of Stevenson as Blake floating on a smoking raft and shouting, "I'm OK! I'm OK!"

In Bobbie Ann Mason's 1985 novel In Country, the teenage protagonist recalls having watched the episode as a child and being "so shocked she went around stunned for days," and confesses that Blake's death on the show had seemed more real to her than the death of her own father in Vietnam. The final scene was spoofed on the Family Guy episode "Fifteen Minutes of Shame" when a cutaway shows Brian Griffin saying to the rest of the family, "I have an announcement. Meg Griffin's plane was shot down over the Sea of Japan. It spun in. There were no survivors."

In 1997, TV Guide included this episode in their list of the "100 Greatest Episodes of All Time", ranking it number 20. In 2005, TV Land included this episode as part of its "Top 100 Most Unexpected Moments in TV History", ranking it number 15.

== Aftermath ==
Not everybody, not every kid gets to go back to Bloomington, Illinois. Fifty thousand – we left fifty thousand boys in Korea – and we realized it was right for the show, because the premise of our show was the wastefulness of the war.

— Gene Reynolds

While "Abyssinia, Henry" is well known for the departure of McLean Stevenson from the series, it was also the final episode in which Wayne Rogers appeared. During the summer 1975 break between seasons three and four, he quit the series. 20th Century Fox sued him for breach of contract, but the lawsuit collapsed, because Rogers had not signed any contract. The character of Trapper John McIntyre was subsequently written off the series in "Welcome to Korea", the first episode of the next season.

As a result, when the cast returned to begin filming the series' fourth season for broadcast starting in September 1975, there were major changes in both the makeup and the direction of the show. The more earnest and faithful family man Captain B.J. Hunnicutt (Mike Farrell) had replaced Trapper John, and the regular Army Colonel Sherman Potter (Harry Morgan) had replaced Henry Blake as commander of the 4077th. Longtime recurring guest cast member Jamie Farr, who played Corporal Maxwell Q. Klinger, was elevated to the regular cast, with his name being featured on the opening credits. Episodes following this represented a major change in focus for the show; the individual effects and psychological damages of war were explored more, often in parallel to the ending of the Vietnam War, and the Korean culture was portrayed in greater depth than had been done before, instead of focusing on a "boorish, military mindset" as before.

In general, the show began to take on a more serious tone as a seriocomic (or dramedy) series, in which the focus was on the character rather than the character type, and became less of a situation comedy.
