= M*A*S*H season 10 =

M*A*S*H
- Season 10
- No. of episodes: 22

Release
- Original network: CBS
- Original release: October 26, 1981 – April 12, 1982

Season chronology
- ← Previous; Season 9 Next → Season 11

The tenth season of M*A*S*H aired Mondays at 9:00–9:30 PM E.T. on CBS from October 26, 1981 to April 12, 1982.

== Cast ==
- Alan Alda as Capt. Benjamin Franklin "Hawkeye" Pierce
- Mike Farrell as Capt. B.J. Hunnicutt
- Harry Morgan as Col. Sherman T. Potter
- Loretta Swit as Maj. Margaret Houlihan
- David Ogden Stiers as Maj. Charles Emerson Winchester III
- Jamie Farr as Cpl./Sgt. Maxwell Q. Klinger
- William Christopher as Capt. Father Francis Mulcahy

== Episodes ==
No. overall	No. in season	Title (Note: Titles taken from DVD)	Directed by (Note: Credits from episode title cards)	Written by	Original release date	Prod. code (Note: Production Code from end credits)
219	1	"That's Show Biz"	Charles S. Dubin	David Pollock & Elias Davis	October 26, 1981	Z-419
220	2	"That's Show Biz"	Charles S. Dubin	David Pollock & Elias Davis	October 26, 1981	Z-420
A former stripper (Gwen Verdon) is the headline of a visiting USO troupe, whose female entertainers find romance with the male surgeons of the 4077th.
221	3	"Identity Crisis"	David Ogden Stiers	Dan Wilcox & Thad Mumford	November 2, 1981	Z-423
A trio of wounded GIs includes a corporal (Joe Pantoliano) who makes an odd confession to Father Mulcahy, an overly talkative mutual fund salesman (Squire Fridell), and a corporal (Dirk Blocker) whose girlfriend has left him for someone of higher social standing. David Ogden Stiers made his TV-directing debut with this episode.
222	4	"Rumor at the Top"	Charles S. Dubin	David Pollock & Elias Davis	November 9, 1981	Z-424
A visit by a general's aide starts a rumor that the 4077th is breaking up.
223	5	"Give 'em Hell, Hawkeye"	Charles S. Dubin	Dennis Koenig	November 16, 1981	1-G01
Frustrated that peace talks have stalled, Hawkeye writes a letter to President Truman about the insanity of the war. Newsreel clip of water skier Charlene Zint is included.
224	6	"Wheelers and Dealers"	Charles S. Dubin	Thad Mumford & Dan Wilcox	November 23, 1981	1-G02
B.J. becomes a gambler due to unsettling news from home, while Potter takes driving-safety classes after getting a traffic ticket.
225	7	"Communication Breakdown"	Alan Alda	Karen Hall	November 30, 1981	1-G03
Charles hoards his newspapers when the mail is delayed, while Hawkeye discovers that a South Korean soldier is the brother of a North Korean prisoner.
226	8	"Snap Judgment"	Hy Averback	Paul Perlove	December 7, 1981	1-G04
When a rash of thefts strikes the 4077th and nearby units, Klinger accidentally implicates himself and ends up facing a court-martial.
227	9	"Snappier Judgment"	Hy Averback	Paul Perlove	December 14, 1981	1-G05
As Charles defends Klinger at his court-martial, Hawkeye and B.J. race to find the real perpetrator of the thefts.
228	10	"'Twas the Day After Christmas"	Burt Metcalfe	Elias Davis & David Pollock	December 28, 1981	1-G06
On the day after Christmas, the 4077th borrows the tradition of Boxing Day from a squad of wounded British soldiers, with the officers and enlisted personnel trading places.
229	11	"Follies of the Living - Concerns of the Dead"	Alan Alda	Alan Alda	January 4, 1982	1-G07
Delirious from a high fever, Klinger communicates with a dead GI (Kario Salem) who doesn't believe he's dead. Alan Alda received a Primetime Emmy Award nomination for writing this episode. Note – There is no laugh track in this episode.
230	12	"The Birthday Girls"	Charles S. Dubin	Karen Hall	January 11, 1982	1-G08
Margaret's plans to spend her birthday in Tokyo go awry, while the surgeons work hard to save a wounded, pregnant cow.
231	13	"Blood and Guts"	Charles S. Dubin	Lee H. Grant	January 18, 1982	1-G09
Clayton Kibbee, a famous war correspondent visits the 4077th and exaggerates the exploits of the soldiers who are to receive the six pints of donated blood he has brought with him.
232	14	"A Holy Mess"	Burt Metcalfe	David Pollock and Elias Davis	February 1, 1982	1-G10
Father Mulcahy gets caught up in a distraught AWOL private's attempt to seek sanctuary at the 4077th, while the rest of the camp is abuzz over the chance to have a breakfast with real eggs.
233	15	"The Tooth Shall Set You Free"	Charles S. Dubin	David Pollock and Elias Davis	February 8, 1982	1G-11
Charles tries to cope with a toothache on his own, while Hawkeye and B.J. suspect a visiting major of trying to get African-American soldiers out of his unit to satisfy his own bigotry. Guest appearance by Laurence Fishburne.
234	16	"Pressure Points"	Charles S. Dubin	David Pollock and Elias Davis	February 15, 1982	1G-12
After a series of mistakes in and out of the OR, Potter calls in Sidney Freedman to help him regain his confidence. Meanwhile, Charles engages in a war of slovenliness against Hawkeye and B.J. Charles S. Dubin received a Primetime Emmy Award nomination for directing this episode.
235	17	"Where There's a Will, There's a War"	Alan Alda	David Pollock and Elias Davis	February 22, 1982	1G-13
Assigned as temporary replacement for a surgeon who has been killed at a front-line aid station, Hawkeye fears that he might not return alive and begins writing his will. Alan Alda received a Primetime Emmy Award nomination for directing this episode.
236	18	"Promotion Commotion"	Charles S. Dubin	Dennis Koenig	March 1, 1982	1G-14
The officers enjoy popularity with the enlisted at promotion time, but a hulking corporal (John Matuszak) threatens to hurt Charles unless he makes sergeant.
237	19	"Heroes"	Nell Cox	Thad Mumford & Dan Wilcox	March 15, 1982	1G-15
While visiting the 4077th on a goodwill tour, a former boxing champ suffers a stroke that leaves him close to death. The media crew swamps Hawkeye for interviews on his prognosis, to B.J.'s disgust.
238	20	"Sons and Bowlers"	Hy Averback	Elias Davis & David Pollock	March 22, 1982	1G-16
The 4077th challenges the Marines to a bowling tournament, while Hawkeye receives news that his father has been hospitalized — which leads to a surprisingly empathetic exchange with and revelation from Charles. Hy Averback received a Primetime Emmy Award nomination for directing this episode.
239	21	"Picture This"	Burt Metcalfe	Karen Hall	April 5, 1982	1G-17
Potter wants to paint a portrait of the staff for his wife's birthday, but a feud between Hawkeye, B.J. and Charles is not a pretty picture. Hawkeye moves out of the Swamp and rents a hut behind Rosie's bar. Burt Metcalfe received a Primetime Emmy Award nomination for directing this episode.
240	22	"That Darn Kid"	David Ogden Stiers	Karen Hall	April 12, 1982	1G-19
Klinger's goat eats the camp's monthly payroll, leaving Hawkeye responsible for $22,000 in destroyed currency. Charles takes out a loan from Rizzo and gets tangled up in the interest he has to pay.
