= M*A*S*H season 9 =

M*A*S*H
- Season 9
- No. of episodes: 20

Release
- Original network: CBS
- Original release: November 17, 1980 – May 4, 1981

Season chronology
- ← Previous; Season 8 Next → Season 10

The ninth season of M*A*S*H aired Mondays at 9:00-9:30 pm on CBS from November 17, 1980 to May 4, 1981.

== Cast ==
- Alan Alda as Capt. Benjamin Franklin "Hawkeye" Pierce
- Mike Farrell as Capt. B.J. Hunnicut
- Harry Morgan as Col. Sherman T. Potter
- Loretta Swit as Maj. Margaret Houlihan
- David Ogden Stiers as Maj. Charles Emerson Winchester III
- Jamie Farr as Cpl. Maxwell Q. Klinger
- William Christopher as Capt. Father Francis Mulcahy

== Episodes ==
No. overall	No. in season	Title (Note: Titles taken from DVD)	Directed by (Note: Credits from episode title cards)	Written by	Original release date	Prod. code (Note: Production Code from end credits)
199	1	"The Best of Enemies"	Charles S. Dubin	Sheldon Bull	November 17, 1980	Z-404
On his way to Seoul, Hawkeye is captured by a North Korean (Mako) who forces him to save his comrade. Meanwhile, Potter and Charles compete to find out who is better at bridge.
200	2	"Letters"	Charles S. Dubin	Dennis Koenig	November 24, 1980	Z-403
The camp answers letters from fourth-graders in Hawkeye's hometown, and Hawkeye struggles to respond to a boy who holds doctors accountable for the death of his soldier brother.
201	3	"Cementing Relationships"	Charles S. Dubin	David Pollock and Elias Davis	December 1, 1980	Z-401
Klinger supervises the creation of a cement floor in the OR, while Margaret is wooed by an amorous patient (Joel Brooks) from Italy.
202	4	"Father's Day"	Alan Alda	Karen Hall	December 8, 1980	Z-405
Margaret tries to whip the camp into shape before her father "Howitzer Al" Houlihan (Andrew Duggan) comes for a visit, but Potter discovers a disturbing side to the father Margaret all but worships. Hawkeye unexpectedly obtains a frozen side of beef.
203	5	"Death Takes a Holiday"	Mike Farrell	Story by : Thad Mumford & Dan Wilcox and Burt Metcalfe; Teleplay by : Mike Farrell, John Rappaport and Dennis Koenig	December 15, 1980	Z-408
The spirit of Christmas is felt at the 4077th during a truce as they throw a potluck party for the orphans, which reveals a surprising side of Charles. But when Hawkeye, B.J. and Margaret receive a mortally wounded soldier, they attempt to keep him alive until the day after Christmas for the sake of his wife and kids.
204	6	"A War for All Seasons"	Burt Metcalfe	Dan Wilcox & Thad Mumford	December 29, 1980	Z-409
A survey of life at the 4077th during the year 1951, including the doctors' efforts to build an artificial kidney and camp-wide bets on whether the Brooklyn Dodgers will win the year's National League championship. Dan Wilcox and Thad Mumford received a Writers Guild Award nomination for this episode. Note – Timeline is from December 1950 to December 1951. This episode contradicts Colonel Potter's arrival at M*A*S*H which occurred September 19, 1952, and also B.J. Hunnicutt's which occurred roughly at the same time when Potter became C.O. and Major Winchester's which occurred after Potter became C.O.
205	7	"Your Retention, Please"	Charles S. Dubin	Erik Tarloff	January 5, 1981	Z-406
A pushy retention officer (Barry Corbin) persuades a depressed Klinger to reenlist; a male nurse chafes over his low rank.
206	8	"Tell It to the Marines"	Harry Morgan	Hank Bradford	January 12, 1981	Z-410
With Charles temporarily in command, Hawkeye fights for the cause of a soon-to-be-discharged Dutch immigrant marine whose mother is about to be deported.
207	9	"Taking the Fifth"	Charles S. Dubin	Elias Davis & David Pollock	January 19, 1981	Z-407
Hawkeye uses a bottle of wine as bait for a date with a nurse, while Potter is mad at the Army for banning the use of curare as a surgical anesthetic.
208	10	"Operation Friendship"	Rena Down	Dennis Koenig	January 26, 1981	Z-412
Charles looks after Klinger in gratitude for saving his life during an autoclave explosion, while a specialist (Tim O'Connor) is brought in to treat B.J. for a compartment hemorrhage injury to his right wrist.
209	11	"No Sweat"	Burt Metcalfe	John Rappaport	February 2, 1981	Z-402
The 4077th deals with a sudden heat wave in their own personal ways: Klinger disassembles the P.A. system, Charles goes through all of his tax returns and bonds, B.J. stresses over a letter from Peg, Margaret develops a severe case of prickly heat, and Colonel Potter can't get a good night's sleep. John Rappaport received a Writers Guild Award nomination for this episode.
210	12	"Depressing News"	Alan Alda	Dan Wilcox & Thad Mumford	February 9, 1981	Z-411
Klinger finds the perfect story to start his unit newspaper: Hawkeye's new craft project, inspired by a mistaken delivery of 500,000 tongue depressors.
211	13	"No Laughing Matter"	Burt Metcalfe	Elias Davis & David Pollock	February 16, 1981	Z-413
B.J. challenges Hawkeye to go through one day without making any jokes, while Charles confronts the colonel who sent him to Korea. Robert Symonds reprises his role as Horace Baldwin, after playing it in the season 6 episode "Fade Out, Fade In".
212	14	"Oh, How We Danced"	Burt Metcalfe	John Rappaport	February 23, 1981	Z-414
Hawkeye plans a surprise for B.J.'s wedding anniversary, while Charles offends a hot-tempered frontline officer. Catherine Bergstrom plays B.J.'s wife Peg.
213	15	"Bottoms Up"	Alan Alda	Dennis Koenig	March 2, 1981	Z-415
Margaret is worried that her friend and colleague (Gail Strickland) has been drinking, while Hawkeye is a social pariah for embarrassing Charles too much during surgery.
214	16	"The Red/White Blues"	Gabrielle Beaumont	Elias Davis & David Pollock	March 9, 1981	Z-416
Potter is given too much kindness when word gets around about his blood pressure, while Klinger is accused of laziness when he is actually having an adverse reaction to primaquine.
215	17	"Bless You, Hawkeye"	Nell Cox	Dan Wilcox & Thad Mumford	March 16, 1981	Z-417
Potter calls Sidney for help when Hawkeye keeps sneezing nonstop. Dan Wilcox and Thad Mumford received a Writers Guild Award nomination for this episode.
216	18	"Blood Brothers"	Harry Morgan	David Pollock & Elias Davis	April 6, 1981	Z-421
Hawkeye discovers troubling news regarding a patient's (Patrick Swayze) blood test, while Father Mulcahy works his heart out to prepare the camp for a visiting Cardinal. Harry Morgan received a Directors Guild Award for this episode.
217	19	"The Foresight Saga"	Charles S. Dubin	Dennis Koenig	April 13, 1981	Z-422
Potter's feeling down when his eyeglasses break, while a letter from Radar and fresh vegetables from a local farmer make everyone else happy.
218	20	"The Life You Save"	Alan Alda	John Rappaport & Alan Alda	May 4, 1981	Z-418
Charles becomes obsessed with death after surviving a near-fatal sniper attack.
