= M*A*S*H Mania =

1977 novel

- First edition (publ. Dodd, Mead & Co.)
- Author: H. Richard Hornberger
- Language: English
- Publication date: 1977

M*A*S*H Mania is a novel written by H. Richard Hornberger under the pseudonym Richard Hooker and originally published in 1977. After a series of M*A*S*H novels that were written by William E. Butterworth but credited to both Hooker and Butterworth, M*A*S*H Mania was his first book since M*A*S*H Goes to Maine (1972). The book, which follows the M*A*S*H characters in their continued post-war adventures in Maine, did not meet the same critical or commercial success as the original novel, MASH: A Novel About Three Army Doctors (1968).

== Plot ==
Spruce Harbor Medical Center

The narrator (in this book, the author himself is a hospital doctor, nicknamed "Hook") introduces the cast of characters, including a poorly respected psychologist, Dr. Ferenc Ovari, nicknamed "Rex Eatapuss" following an incident at a lecture he was delivering about Freud's theories.

The Miracle of Harbor Point

Spearchucker Jones's house is overrun by birdwatchers following the rare appearance of a black-headed grosbeak. Tiring of the interruption, Doctors Jones, Pierce, Forrest and Macintyre persuade local character Halfaman Timberlake to put on a bird costume to distract the birdwatchers, but the disturbance persuades the actual grosbeak to move on.

The Return of Boom-Boom Benner

A new chest surgeon is taken on in 1971 as assistant to Trapper John. Doctor Walter Benner has the reputation of being brilliant but strange and sets about living up to both aspects when he arrives. His nickname comes from his habit of responding to all conversation with the phrase "Boom-boom" when he is tired of participating further and he is uninterested in dull routine tasks, believing justifiably that his talents are far better employed in his specialist area. Pierce, who fostered him as a troubled but gifted child, gives Benner the advice he needs to navigate the hospital bureaucracy and hence ensures that Spruce Harbor will continue to enjoy the presence of an outstanding heart specialist.

Dragons

Rex Eatapuss and hospital administrator Goofus MacDuff overhear Duke Forrest telling a tall tale about a witch, Miss Penelope Flewelling and undertake to have Duke and Hawkeye sectioned since they mistakenly think Pierce and Forrest believe the stories true. Both doctors opt to keep up the joke as far as an informal hearing before Judge Carr. Hawkeye obliges with a humorous story about his "dragon-crunching" adventures as a youth and how he induced a dragon called "Big Sid" to breathe fire on Hiroshima and Nagasaki, leading the world to believe that America had developed the atom bomb. After enjoying the story and the sheer stupidity of MacDuff and Ovari, the Judge dismisses the case.

Christmas Story

The doctors spread Christmas joy by persuading well-off citizens of Spruce Harbor to make charitable donations, firstly to buy a number of valuable keeshond puppies to raise funds for the breeder (who along with his wife has been temporarily disabled by a road accident) and then to provide treats and necessities for some of the poorer residents. With Christmas assured, Hawkeye is able to return home shortly before midnight, promising his wife to make it up to the children the next day.

Meanstreak

A new neurosurgeon joins Spruce Harbor Medical Center. This is Claremont Morse, who acquired his nickname in his school football days when his size, strength and uncompromising attitude provoked a complaint from an opponent. Meanstreak is surprisingly old for a junior doctor, having declared an ambition to become a brain surgeon when a persistent back disorder left him unable to pursue his previous occupation – clam-digger. However, since Mrs. Morse is Hawkeye's sister, she is able to persuade him that Meanstreak is brighter than he appears, and when he tests close to 140 IQ Dr. Pierce starts to prepare the way for him to enter medical school. Meanstreak proves extremely industrious and determined and, having entered higher education at the age of 37, finally joins Spruce Harbor as a fully qualified neurosurgeon aged 51 – to be welcomed to the staff by Claremont Junior, now head of neurosurgery in Dr. Jones's place, who is now even bigger than his father and warns him that "I can take you now, you mean old bastard".

The Moose of Moose Bend

During the Korean War, local bayou ne'er-do-well Laurier Castonguay serves briefly as an infantryman before being wounded and sent home by way of a non-combat posting in Japan. He brings with him Amiko, his Japanese girlfriend, whom he marries. Although disappointed to find herself living in poverty, Amiko becomes a dutiful although often battered wife, but comes to Duke Forrest's attention when she is admitted with thyroid cancer. To his surprise, Amiko responds miraculously well to treatment, and when Duke learns more about her home life he pays Laurier a visit and threatens to kill him if he is ever guilty of wife-beating again. A year later when the doctors are passing Moose Bend they engage Laurier, rather against his will, as a hunting and fishing guide, which he does well enough, and are able to determine that he has a lung complaint caused by his war injury. They arrange for surgery and for back-payment of disability pension, and also learn that Laurier, although uneducated, is able to acquire some basic literacy and numeracy. While Amiko qualifies as a medical technician, Laurier also finds regular employment and a new sense of pride in being the man of the house, and the Castonguays escape poverty for good.

Psychoanalysis

In late 1974, Hawkeye Pierce, by then over fifty, is feeling a need for some rest, and after the usual eccentricities he accepts Spearchucker's suggestion to interview an up-and-coming young doctor named D'Artagnan Maguire. Although Pierce's language is as overtly racist in the mid-1970s as at any time previously, he is blithely unconcerned at the news that Maguire is Black, offering an immediate start and a generous salary and also house-room for himself and his family under Pierce's own roof while he is establishing himself. Meanwhile, the psychology department, which is viewed as useless by the surgeons, has gained approval to psychoanalyze the entire staff. Pierce and company set about playing pranks upon them, including having Juicy "Big Dumpsmell" Larkins masquerade as Doctor Maguire and be psychoanalyzed in his stead. Once they have had their fun, Hawkeye announces that it is time for the mental health department to be transformed, which he will supervise on his return from holiday.

Social Service

Hawkeye is intent upon replacing Rex Eatapuss and his staff, and also providing social service, which is a task the doctors are already performing more competently than the nominal Mental Health and Social Service department. Two of the senior hospital administrators, already known for unconventional fund-raising methods, set about making capital available. While this is going on, a rape counselor arrives in Spruce Harbor, which the doctors view as a gross waste of time and money given the rarity of rape in their community. They enlist the prostitutes from Betty Bang-Bang's brothel as rape complainants and take care to assign clearly incapable men as the accused parties – one of them being Dr. Doggy Moore, close to eighty and flattered to be accused. The facilities for the new Mental Health and Social Service departments are war surplus tents similar to those the doctors used in Korea, and General Henry Braymore Blake is able to write off the delivery as a "training exercise". When Dr. Moore, and Halfaman Timberlake's pet bear, appear in court for rape, Judge Carr dismisses the case out of hand and orders the district attorney to stay behind for a scolding. With the new mental health clinic in full swing, the story closes with the news that, while Rex Eatapuss and his staff may have been lamentable failures in their medical careers, they are showing signs of running an excellent seafood restaurant.
