= M*A*S*H Goes to Maine =

1971 novel written by Richard Hooker

Cover to the paperback edition (Pocket Books, 1973)

M*A*S*H Goes to Maine is a novel written by Richard Hooker and originally published in 1971. A sequel to 1968's book MASH: A Novel About Three Army Doctors, it features several of that novel's characters back in rural Maine after the Korean War armistice. An attempt to adapt M*A*S*H Goes to Maine as a feature film sequel to the 1970 movie was unsuccessful.

== Plot summary ==
Captain Benjamin Franklin "Hawkeye" Pierce returns from duty in the Korean War (1950–1953) to live in Crabapple Cove, Maine, near the town of Spruce Harbor, Maine. Having left the army, Hawkeye is established to be working for the Veterans Administration. In May 1954 he is laid off. At this point Hawkeye, who does not have much money in the bank, is 31 years old, and has three children: Billy, Stephen and Karen.

The day he is discharged, old army buddy and co-conspirator in hijinks "Trapper John" McIntyre comes to visit and sets Hawkeye's future in motion. Trapper John, a lieutenant in the "Cardia Nostra" medical "family" (as Hawkeye refers to it) of "Don" Maxie Neville in New York City, arranges for further thoracic training for Hawkeye, first in the East Orange VA Hospital in New Jersey, then at St. Lombard's Hospital in Manhattan from July 1954. After two years Hawkeye breezes through the Thoracic Boards. At the end of his training in June 1956, two Spruce Harbor locals, Jocko Allcock (the man who was responsible for Hawkeye being fired by the V.A.) and "Wooden Leg" Wilcox (the local fish marketing magnate) come to visit Hawkeye to set him up in practice—by betting favorably on the outcome of his operations.

The first operation with Trapper John's assistance (upon Pasquale Merlino) is a success, and thanks to his superior training Hawkeye becomes the local surgeon. As time goes by, Hawkeye is given more patients by the local general practitioner of note, "Doggy" Moore M.D.; goes into private practice with ex-Spitfire fighter pilot Tony Holcombe and plots the eventually reuniting of "The Swamp" Gang. By 1959, Hawkeye has lured Trapper John, Duke Forrest, and "Spearchucker" Jones into his net, and thanks to the proceeds of the "Allcock-Wilcox" syndicate, a new "Finestkind Fishmarket and Clinic" is set up along with the newly constructed Spruce Harbor General Hospital.

Duke returns to Georgia from Korea, and takes a course in urology. Hawkeye then invites him up to Spruce Harbor, Maine to join him and a new friend, Tony Holcombe in private practice. Duke immediately turns up in Maine with his bloodhound, Little Eva, and joins Hawkeye in persuading Spearchucker to become the local neurosurgeon. Duke and his family move into Crabapple Cove next to Hawkeye and Mary Pierce. Trapper John is lured to the area by the possibility of becoming the Don of Spruce Harbor in the Cardia Nostra and becomes romantically involved with Hawkeye's secretary, Lucinda Lively, whom he eventually marries.

Along the way, the reader meets more of the local characters, including "Wrong Way" Napolitano, who sometimes uses the transatlantic jet planes he flies for a major airline to spot fish for his fisherman relatives in the Gulf of Maine; "Moose" Lord, a longtime friend of "Big Benjy" Pierce who contracts a rare and extremely nasty form of cancer that Hawkeye has to treat; "Goofus" MacDuff, the medical director of Spruce Harbor General, whose ability to summarize a case and reach the completely wrong conclusion and diagnosis is the stuff of legend to the Swampmen; "Doggy" Moore, the previously mentioned general practitioner whose adopted son Chip (short for Chipmunk) Moore was a high school and college buddy of Hawkeye's; "Half A Man" Timberlake, who is not overly bright but is sexually insatiable, and Wooden Leg's loyal henchman; the three local hookers, 'Bang-Bang" Betty, "Mattress" Mary, and "Made" Marion; and Hawkeye's Uncle Lewis "Lew the Jew" Pierce, who is a fanatic golfer and lives on an old fishing pier in The Solid Rust Cadillac.

== Setting ==
Pierce's home, "Port Waldo", is (real-life) Waldoboro, Maine, and the FinestKind Clinic is just up U.S. Route 1 in Rockland. "Crabapple Cove" is actually Broad Cove, in Bremen just down the Medomak River from Waldoboro Village. Author Richard Hooker (Hornberger) owned a house on Heath Point, in Bremen. Wreck Island, Thief Island, and other Muscongus Bay landmarks are mentioned in the book.
