= List of M*A*S*H episodes =

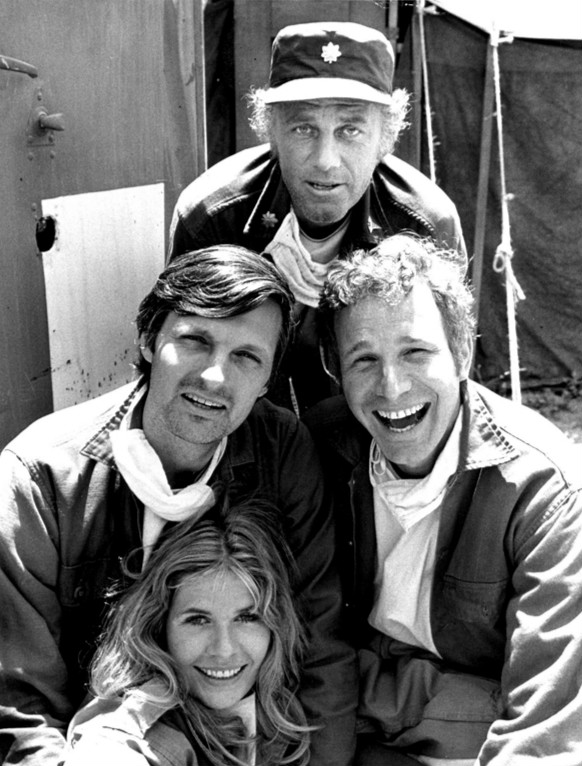
Alan Alda (left), Wayne Rogers (right), McLean Stevenson (in back) and Loretta Swit (in front) from the first season of M*A*S*H

M*A*S*H is an American television series developed by Larry Gelbart and adapted from the 1970 feature film MASH (which was itself based on the 1968 novel MASH: A Novel About Three Army Doctors by Richard Hooker). It follows a team of doctors and support staff stationed at the 4077th MASH (Mobile Army Surgical Hospital) in Uijeongbu, South Korea, during the Korean War. The episodes were produced by 20th Century Fox Television for the CBS network and aired from September 17, 1972, to February 28, 1983. The series, which covered a three-year military conflict, spanned 251 episodes over 11 seasons, including the 2.5 hour finale.

The regular cast originally consisted of Alan Alda as Captain Benjamin Franklin "Hawkeye" Pierce and Wayne Rogers as Captain "Trapper" John McIntyre, two surgeons; McLean Stevenson as Lieutenant Colonel Henry Blake, a surgeon and the base commander; Loretta Swit as Major Margaret J. "Hot Lips" Houlihan, the head nurse; Larry Linville as Major Frank Burns, another surgeon; and Gary Burghoff as Corporal Walter "Radar" O'Reilly, the company clerk. Recurring characters in the first season consisted of John Orchard as Captain "Capt. Ugly John Black" Black, Timothy Brown as Captain "Spearchucker" Jones, William Christopher as First Lieutenant 'Father' John Patrick Mulcahy, the company chaplain (played by George Morgan in the pilot), and Jamie Farr as Corporal Maxwell Klinger.

Several changes were made in the cast line up during the 11-year run. Ugly John and Spearchucker were dropped after the first season, while Klinger and Father Mulcahy were retained and became permanent cast members in, respectively, the fourth and fifth seasons. Rogers and Stevenson left the series at the end of the third season and were replaced in the fourth by, respectively, Mike Farrell as Captain B. J. Hunnicutt and Harry Morgan as Colonel Sherman Potter. Linville left the series at the end of the fifth season and was replaced in the sixth by David Ogden Stiers as Major Charles Emerson Winchester III. Burghoff left the series during the eighth season. Two recurring characters—Allan Arbus as Major Sidney Freedman, a psychiatrist (called Milton Freedman in his first appearance) and Edward Winter as Colonel Sam Flagg (a Lieutenant Colonel, before the fourth season), CIA—were introduced in the second season.

Although not an immediate success, the popularity of M*A*S*H increased in its second season, when it ranked among the ten most-popular programs on prime time American television. Except for the fourth season, where it dropped to number 15, the series stayed in the top 10 for the remainder of its run. The final episode, "Goodbye, Farewell and Amen", became the most-watched show in American television history with 106 million viewers. During its 11-year run M*A*S*H received 14 Emmy Awards. The series continues to air in syndication, while the entire run has been released on DVD.

== Series overview ==
Season	Episodes	Originally released		Rank	Rating
Season	Episodes	First released	Last released	Rank	Rating
1	24	September 17, 1972	March 25, 1973	46	17.5
2	24	September 15, 1973	March 2, 1974	4	25.7
3	24	September 10, 1974	March 18, 1975	5	27.4
4	25	September 12, 1975	February 24, 1976	14	22.9
5	25	September 21, 1976	March 15, 1977	4	25.9
6	25	September 20, 1977	March 27, 1978	8	23.2
7	26	September 18, 1978	March 12, 1979	7	25.4
8	25	September 17, 1979	March 24, 1980	4	25.3
9	20	November 17, 1980	May 4, 1981	4	25.7
10	22	October 26, 1981	April 12, 1982	9	22.3
11	16	October 25, 1982	February 28, 1983	3	22.6

Cast
Character	Played by	Season										
Character	Played by	1	2	3	4	5	6	7	8	9	10	11
Capt. Benjamin Franklin "Hawkeye" Pierce	Alan Alda	Main	Main	Main	Main	Main	Main	Main	Main	Main	Main	Main
Capt. "Trapper John" McIntyre	Wayne Rogers	Main	Main	Main								
Capt. B.J. Hunnicutt	Mike Farrell				Main	Main	Main	Main	Main	Main	Main	Main
Lt. Col. Henry Blake	McLean Stevenson	Main	Main	Main								
Col. Sherman T. Potter	Harry Morgan^{[note a]}				Main	Main	Main	Main	Main	Main	Main	Main
Maj. Margaret "Hot Lips" Houlihan	Loretta Swit	Main	Main	Main	Main	Main	Main	Main	Main	Main	Main	Main
Maj. Frank Burns	Larry Linville	Main	Main	Main	Main	Main						
Maj. Charles Winchester	David Ogden Stiers						Main	Main	Main	Main	Main	Main
Cpl. Walter "Radar" O'Reilly	Gary Burghoff	Main	Main	Main	Main	Main	Main	Main	Main			
Cpl. Maxwell Q. Klinger	Jamie Farr	Recurring	Recurring	Recurring	Recurring	Main	Main	Main	Main	Main	Main	Main
Father Francis Mulcahy	William Christopher^{[note b]}	Recurring	Recurring	Recurring	Recurring	Recurring	Main	Main	Main	Main	Main	Main
Major Sidney Freedman^{[note c]}	Allan Arbus		Recurring	Recurring	Recurring	Recurring	Recurring	Recurring	Recurring	Recurring	Recurring	Recurring
Colonel Sam Flagg^{[note d]}	Edward Winter		Recurring	Recurring	Recurring	Recurring	Recurring	Recurring	Recurring	Recurring	Recurring	Recurring
Captain "Ugly John" Black	John Orchard	Rec.										
Captain "Spearchucker" Jones	Timothy Brown	Rec.										
Notes: a. Harry Morgan was a guest star in the third season in a different role; b. George Morgan played Father Mulcahy in the series' first episode; c. Called Milton Freeman in his first appearance; d. Presented as a Lieutenant Colonel in the second and third seasons

== Episodes ==
- All episodes are listed in order of air date.
- No. in Series refers to that episode's number within the overall series.
- No. in Season refers to the order in which the episode aired within that particular season.
- Production codes are taken from the M*A*S*H episode database.

=== Season 1 (1972–73) ===
- Captain Spearchucker Jones and Captain Ugly John are introduced as supporting characters; both are dropped during the season's run.

No. overall	No. in season	Title (Note: Titles taken from DVD)	Directed by (Note: Credits from episode title cards)	Written by	Original release date	Prod. code (Note: Production Code from end credits)
1	1	"Pilot"	Gene Reynolds	Larry Gelbart	September 17, 1972	Z-9522
2	2	"To Market, to Market"	Michael O'Herlihy	Burt Styler	September 24, 1972	J-303
3	3	"Requiem for a Lightweight"	Hy Averback	Robert Klane	October 1, 1972	J-308
4	4	"Chief Surgeon Who?"	E.W. Swackhamer	Larry Gelbart	October 8, 1972	J-307
5	5	"The Moose"	Hy Averback	Laurence Marks	October 15, 1972	J-305
6	6	"Yankee Doodle Doctor"	Lee Philips	Laurence Marks	October 22, 1972	J-310
7	7	"Bananas, Crackers and Nuts"	Bruce Bilson	Burt Styler	November 5, 1972	J-311
8	8	"Cowboy"	Don Weis	Robert Klane	November 12, 1972	J-309
9	9	"Henry, Please Come Home"	William Wiard	Laurence Marks	November 19, 1972	J-302
10	10	"I Hate a Mystery"	Hy Averback	Hal Dresner	November 26, 1972	J-306
11	11	"Germ Warfare"	Terry Becker	Larry Gelbart	December 10, 1972	J-304
12	12	"Dear Dad"	Gene Reynolds	Larry Gelbart	December 17, 1972	J-313
13	13	"Edwina"	James Sheldon	Hal Dresner	December 24, 1972	J-312
14	14	"Love Story"	Earl Bellamy	Laurence Marks	January 7, 1973	J-314
15	15	"Tuttle"	William Wiard	Bruce Shelly & David Ketchum	January 14, 1973	J-315
16	16	"The Ringbanger"	Jackie Cooper	Jerry Mayer	January 21, 1973	J-316
17	17	"Sometimes You Hear the Bullet"	William Wiard	Carl Kleinschmitt	January 28, 1973	J-318
18	18	"Dear Dad...Again"	Jackie Cooper	Sheldon Keller & Larry Gelbart	February 4, 1973	J-317
19	19	"The Long-John Flap"	William Wiard	Alan Alda	February 18, 1973	J-319
20	20	"The Army-Navy Game"	Gene Reynolds	Story by : McLean Stevenson; Teleplay by : Sid Dorfman	February 25, 1973	J-322
21	21	"Sticky Wicket"	Don Weis	Story by : Richard Baer; Teleplay by : Laurence Marks and Larry Gelbart	March 4, 1973	J-321
22	22	"Major Fred C. Dobbs"	Don Weis	Sid Dorfman	March 11, 1973	J-320
23	23	"Ceasefire"	Earl Bellamy	Story by : Robert Klane; Teleplay by : Laurence Marks & Larry Gelbart	March 18, 1973	J-323
24	24	"Showtime"	Jackie Cooper	Story by : Larry Gelbart; Teleplay by : Robert Klane & Larry Gelbart	March 25, 1973	J-324

=== Season 2 (1973–74) ===
No. overall	No. in season	Title	Directed by	Written by	Original release date	Prod. code
25	1	"Divided We Stand"	Jackie Cooper	Larry Gelbart	September 15, 1973	K-401
26	2	"5 O'Clock Charlie"	Norman Tokar	Story by : Keith Walker; Teleplay by : Larry Gelbart & Laurence Marks and Keith Walker	September 22, 1973	K-403
27	3	"Radar's Report"	Jackie Cooper	Story by : Sheldon Keller; Teleplay by : Laurence Marks	September 29, 1973	K-402
28	4	"For the Good of the Outfit"	Jackie Cooper	Jerry Mayer	October 6, 1973	K-404
29	5	"Dr. Pierce and Mr. Hyde"	Jackie Cooper	Alan Alda and Robert Klane	October 13, 1973	K-405
30	6	"Kim"	William Wiard	Marc Mandel and Larry Gelbart & Laurence Marks	October 20, 1973	K-407
31	7	"L.I.P. (Local Indigenous Personnel)"	William Wiard	Story by : Carl Kleinschmitt; Teleplay by : Carl Kleinschmitt and Larry Gelbart & Laurence Marks	October 27, 1973	K-406
32	8	"The Trial of Henry Blake"	Don Weis	McLean Stevenson	November 3, 1973	K-408
33	9	"Dear Dad... Three"	Don Weis	Larry Gelbart & Laurence Marks	November 10, 1973	K-409
34	10	"The Sniper"	Jackie Cooper	Richard M. Powell	November 17, 1973	K-410
35	11	"Carry On, Hawkeye"	Jackie Cooper	Story by : Bernard Dilbert; Teleplay by : Bernard Dilbert and Larry Gelbart & Laurence Marks	November 24, 1973	K-411
36	12	"The Incubator"	Jackie Cooper	Larry Gelbart & Laurence Marks	December 1, 1973	K-412
37	13	"Deal Me Out"	Gene Reynolds	Larry Gelbart & Laurence Marks	December 8, 1973	K-413
38	14	"Hot Lips and Empty Arms"	Jackie Cooper	Linda Bloodworth & Mary Kay Place	December 15, 1973	K-414
39	15	"Officers Only"	Jackie Cooper	Ed Jurist	December 22, 1973	K-415
40	16	"Henry in Love"	Don Weis	Larry Gelbart & Laurence Marks	January 5, 1974	K-416
41	17	"For Want of a Boot"	Don Weis	Sheldon Keller	January 12, 1974	K-417
42	18	"Operation Noselift"	Hy Averback	Story by : Paul Richards and Erik Tarloff; Teleplay by : Erik Tarloff	January 19, 1974	K-418
43	19	"The Chosen People"	Jackie Cooper	Story by : Gerry Renert & Jeff Wilhelm; Teleplay by : Laurence Marks & Sheldon Keller & Larry Gelbart	January 26, 1974	K-419
44	20	"As You Were"	Hy Averback	Story by : Gene Reynolds; Teleplay by : Larry Gelbart & Laurence Marks	February 2, 1974	K-420
45	21	"Crisis"	Don Weis	Larry Gelbart & Laurence Marks	February 9, 1974	K-421
46	22	"George"	Gene Reynolds	Regier & Markowitz (Note: John W. Regier & Gary Markowitz)	February 16, 1974	K-422
47	23	"Mail Call"	Alan Alda	Larry Gelbart & Laurence Marks	February 23, 1974	K-423
48	24	"A Smattering of Intelligence"	Larry Gelbart	Larry Gelbart & Laurence Marks	March 2, 1974	K-424

=== Season 3 (1974–75) ===
No. overall	No. in season	Title	Directed by	Written by	Original release date	Prod. code
49	1	"The General Flipped at Dawn"	Larry Gelbart	Jim Fritzell & Everett Greenbaum	September 10, 1974	B-308
50	2	"Rainbow Bridge"	Hy Averback	Larry Gelbart & Laurence Marks	September 17, 1974	B-301
51	3	"Officer of the Day"	Hy Averback	Laurence Marks	September 24, 1974	B-307
52	4	"Iron Guts Kelly"	Don Weis	Larry Gelbart & Sid Dorfman	October 1, 1974	B-304
53	5	"O.R."	Gene Reynolds	Larry Gelbart & Laurence Marks	October 8, 1974	B-306
54	6	"Springtime"	Don Weis	Linda Bloodworth & Mary Kay Place	October 15, 1974	B-303
55	7	"Check-Up"	Don Weis	Laurence Marks	October 22, 1974	B-312
56	8	"Life with Father"	Hy Averback	Everett Greenbaum & Jim Fritzell	October 29, 1974	B-302
57	9	"Alcoholics Unanimous"	Hy Averback	Everett Greenbaum & Jim Fritzell	November 12, 1974	B-314
58	10	"There Is Nothing Like a Nurse"	Hy Averback	Larry Gelbart	November 19, 1974	B-309
59	11	"Adam's Ribs"	Gene Reynolds	Laurence Marks	November 26, 1974	B-316
60	12	"A Full Rich Day"	Gene Reynolds	John D. Hess	December 3, 1974	B-311
61	13	"Mad Dogs and Servicemen"	Hy Averback	Linda Bloodworth & Mary Kay Place	December 10, 1974	B-317
62	14	"Private Charles Lamb"	Hy Averback	Sid Dorfman	December 31, 1974	B-310
63	15	"Bombed"	Hy Averback	Jim Fritzell & Everett Greenbaum	January 7, 1975	B-320
64	16	"Bulletin Board"	Alan Alda	Larry Gelbart & Simon Muntner	January 14, 1975	B-323
65	17	"The Consultant"	Gene Reynolds	Story by : Larry Gelbart; Teleplay by : Robert Klane	January 21, 1975	B-318
66	18	"House Arrest"	Hy Averback	Jim Fritzell & Everett Greenbaum	February 4, 1975	B-315
67	19	"Aid Station"	William Jurgensen	Larry Gelbart & Simon Muntner	February 11, 1975	B-322
68	20	"Love and Marriage"	Lee Philips	Arthur Julian	February 18, 1975	B-321
69	21	"Big Mac"	Don Weis	Laurence Marks	February 25, 1975	B-313
70	22	"Payday"	Hy Averback	Regier & Markowitz (Note: John W. Regier & Gary Markowitz)	March 4, 1975	B-305
71	23	"White Gold"	Hy Averback	Larry Gelbart & Simon Muntner	March 11, 1975	B-319
72	24	"Abyssinia, Henry"	Larry Gelbart	Everett Greenbaum & Jim Fritzell	March 18, 1975	B-324

=== Season 4 (1975–76) ===
No. overall	No. in season	Title	Directed by	Written by	Original release date	Prod. code
73	1	"Welcome to Korea"	Gene Reynolds	Everett Greenbaum & Jim Fritzell and Larry Gelbart	September 12, 1975	G-504
74	2	"Welcome to Korea"	Gene Reynolds	Everett Greenbaum & Jim Fritzell and Larry Gelbart	September 12, 1975	G-506
75	3	"Change of Command"	Gene Reynolds	Jim Fritzell & Everett Greenbaum	September 19, 1975	G-501
76	4	"It Happened One Night"	Gene Reynolds	Story by : Gene Reynolds; Teleplay by : Larry Gelbart & Simon Muntner	September 26, 1975	G-502
77	5	"The Late Captain Pierce"	Alan Alda	Glen Charles & Les Charles	October 3, 1975	G-507
78	6	"Hey, Doc"	William Jurgensen	Rick Mittleman	October 10, 1975	G-510
79	7	"The Bus"	Gene Reynolds	John D. Hess	October 17, 1975	G-512
80	8	"Dear Mildred"	Alan Alda	Everett Greenbaum & Jim Fritzell	October 24, 1975	G-505
81	9	"The Kids"	Alan Alda	Jim Fritzell & Everett Greenbaum	October 31, 1975	G-511
82	10	"Quo Vadis, Captain Chandler?"	Larry Gelbart	Burt Prelutsky	November 7, 1975	G-513
83	11	"Dear Peggy"	Burt Metcalfe	Jim Fritzell & Everett Greenbaum	November 14, 1975	G-509
84	12	"Of Moose and Men"	John Erman	Jay Folb	November 21, 1975	G-503
85	13	"Soldier of the Month"	Gene Reynolds	Linda Bloodworth	November 28, 1975	G-514
86	14	"The Gun"	Burt Metcalfe	Larry Gelbart & Gene Reynolds	December 2, 1975	G-517
87	15	"Mail Call...Again"	George Tyne	Jim Fritzell & Everett Greenbaum	December 9, 1975	G-518
88	16	"The Price of Tomato Juice"	Gene Reynolds	Larry Gelbart & Gene Reynolds	December 16, 1975	G-519
89	17	"Dear Ma"	Alan Alda	Everett Greenbaum & Jim Fritzell	December 23, 1975	G-515
90	18	"Der Tag"	Gene Reynolds	Everett Greenbaum & Jim Fritzell	January 6, 1976	G-522
91	19	"Hawkeye"	Larry Gelbart	Larry Gelbart & Simon Muntner	January 13, 1976	G-520
92	20	"Some 38th Parallels"	Burt Metcalfe	Regier & Markowitz (Note: John W. Regier & Gary Markowitz)	January 20, 1976	G-521
93	21	"The Novocaine Mutiny"	Harry Morgan	Burt Prelutsky	January 27, 1976	G-523
94	22	"Smilin' Jack"	Charles Dubin	Larry Gelbart & Simon Muntner	February 3, 1976	G-508
95	23	"The More I See You"	Gene Reynolds	Larry Gelbart & Gene Reynolds	February 10, 1976	G-524
96	24	"Deluge"	William Jurgensen	Larry Gelbart & Simon Muntner	February 17, 1976	G-516
97	25	"The Interview"	Larry Gelbart	Larry Gelbart	February 24, 1976	G-525

=== Season 5 (1976–77) ===
No. overall	No. in season	Title	Directed by	Written by	Original release date	Prod. code
98	1	"Bug Out"	Gene Reynolds	Jim Fritzell & Everett Greenbaum	September 21, 1976	U-801
99	2	"Bug Out"	Gene Reynolds	Jim Fritzell & Everett Greenbaum	September 21, 1976	U-802
100	3	"Margaret's Engagement"	Alan Alda	Gary Markowitz	September 28, 1976	U-803
101	4	"Out of Sight, Out of Mind"	Gene Reynolds	Ken Levine & David Isaacs	October 5, 1976	U-806
102	5	"Lt. Radar O'Reilly"	Alan Rafkin	Everett Greenbaum & Jim Fritzell	October 12, 1976	U-805
103	6	"The Nurses"	Joan Darling	Linda Bloodworth	October 19, 1976	U-809
104	7	"The Abduction of Margaret Houlihan"	Gene Reynolds	Story by : Gene Reynolds; Teleplay by : Allan Katz & Don Reo	October 26, 1976	U-808
105	8	"Dear Sigmund"	Alan Alda	Alan Alda	November 9, 1976	U-810
106	9	"Mulcahy's War"	George Tyne	Richard Cogan	November 16, 1976	U-812
107	10	"The Korean Surgeon"	Gene Reynolds	Bill Idelson	November 23, 1976	U-814
108	11	"Hawkeye Get Your Gun"	William Jurgensen	Story by : Gene Reynolds & Jay Folb; Teleplay by : Jay Folb	November 30, 1976	U-813
109	12	"The Colonel's Horse"	Burt Metcalfe	Jim Fritzell and Everett Greenbaum	December 7, 1976	U-811
110	13	"Exorcism"	Alan Alda	Story by : Gene Reynolds & Jay Folb; Teleplay by : Jay Folb	December 14, 1976	U-815
111	14	"Hawk's Nightmare"	Burt Metcalfe	Burt Prelutsky	December 21, 1976	U-804
112	15	"The Most Unforgettable Characters"	Burt Metcalfe	Ken Levine & David Isaacs	January 4, 1977	U-818
113	16	"38 Across"	Burt Metcalfe	Jim Fritzell & Everett Greenbaum	January 11, 1977	U-821
114	17	"Ping Pong"	William Jurgensen	Sid Dorfman	January 18, 1977	U-817
115	18	"End Run"	Harry Morgan	John D. Hess	January 25, 1977	U-816
116	19	"Hanky Panky"	Gene Reynolds	Gene Reynolds	February 1, 1977	U-822
117	20	"Hepatitis"	Alan Alda	Alan Alda	February 8, 1977	U-823
118	21	"The General's Practitioner"	Alan Rafkin	Burt Prelutsky	February 15, 1977	U-807
119	22	"Movie Tonight"	Burt Metcalfe	Gene Reynolds, Don Reo, Allan Katz and Jay Folb	February 22, 1977	U-824
120	23	"Souvenirs"	Joshua Shelley	Story by : Burt Prelutsky and Reinhold Weege; Teleplay by : Burt Prelutsky	March 1, 1977	U-819
121	24	"Post Op"	Gene Reynolds	Story by : Gene Reynolds & Jay Folb; Teleplay by : Ken Levine & David Isaacs	March 8, 1977	U-825
122	25	"Margaret's Marriage"	Gene Reynolds	Everett Greenbaum & Jim Fritzell	March 15, 1977	U-820

=== Season 6 (1977–78) ===
No. overall	No. in season	Title	Directed by	Written by	Original release date	Prod. code
123	1	"Fade Out, Fade In"	Hy Averback	Jim Fritzell & Everett Greenbaum	September 20, 1977	Y-101
124	2	"Fade Out, Fade In"	Hy Averback	Jim Fritzell & Everett Greenbaum	September 20, 1977	Y-102
125	3	"Fallen Idol"	Alan Alda	Alan Alda	September 27, 1977	Y-104
126	4	"Last Laugh"	Don Weis	Everett Greenbaum & Jim Fritzell	October 4, 1977	Y-103
127	5	"War of Nerves"	Alan Alda	Alan Alda	October 11, 1977	Y-106
128	6	"The Winchester Tapes"	Burt Metcalfe	Everett Greenbaum & Jim Fritzell	October 18, 1977	Y-107
129	7	"The Light That Failed"	Charles Dubin	Burt Prelutsky	October 25, 1977	Y-108
130	8	"In Love and War"	Alan Alda	Alan Alda	November 1, 1977	Y-112
131	9	"Change Day"	Don Weis	Laurence Marks	November 8, 1977	Y-113
132	10	"Images"	Burt Metcalfe	Burt Prelutsky	November 15, 1977	Y-105
133	11	"The M*A*S*H Olympics"	Don Weis	Ken Levine & David Isaacs	November 22, 1977	Y-111
134	12	"The Grim Reaper"	George Tyne	Burt Prelutsky	November 29, 1977	Y-110
135	13	"Comrades in Arms: Part 1"	Burt Metcalfe and Alan Alda	Alan Alda	December 6, 1977	Y-116
136	14	"Comrades in Arms: Part 2"	Alan Alda and Burt Metcalfe	Alan Alda	December 13, 1977	Y-117
137	15	"The Merchant of Korea"	William Jurgensen	Ken Levine & David Isaacs	December 20, 1977	Y-118
138	16	"The Smell of Music"	Stuart Millar	Jim Fritzell & Everett Greenbaum	January 3, 1978	Y-115
139	17	"Patent 4077"	Harry Morgan	Ken Levine & David Isaacs	January 10, 1978	Y-114
140	18	"Tea and Empathy"	Don Weis	Bill Idelson	January 17, 1978	Y-109
141	19	"Your Hit Parade"	George Tyne	Ronny Graham	January 24, 1978	Y-124
142	20	"What's Up, Doc?"	George Tyne	Larry Balmagia	January 30, 1978	Y-119
143	21	"Mail Call Three"	Charles Dubin	Everett Greenbaum & Jim Fritzell	February 6, 1978	Y-121
144	22	"Temporary Duty"	Burt Metcalfe	Larry Balmagia	February 13, 1978	Y-125
145	23	"Potter's Retirement"	William Jurgensen	Laurence Marks	February 20, 1978	Y-120
146	24	"Dr. Winchester and Mr. Hyde"	Charles Dubin	Ken Levine & David Isaacs and Ronny Graham	February 27, 1978	Y-122
147	25	"Major Topper"	Charles Dubin	Allyn Freeman	March 27, 1978	Y-123

=== Season 7 (1978–79) ===
No. overall	No. in season	Title	Directed by	Written by	Original release date	Prod. code
148	1	"Commander Pierce"	Burt Metcalfe	Story by : Ronny Graham and Don Segall; Teleplay by : Ronny Graham	September 18, 1978	T-404
149	2	"Peace on Us"	George Tyne	Ken Levine & David Isaacs	September 25, 1978	T-401
150	3	"Lil"	Burt Metcalfe	Sheldon Bull	October 2, 1978	T-406
151	4	"Our Finest Hour"	Burt Metcalfe	Ken Levine & David Isaacs; Larry Balmagia & Ronny Graham; David Lawrence	October 9, 1978	T-408
152	5	"Our Finest Hour"	Burt Metcalfe	Ken Levine & David Isaacs; Larry Balmagia & Ronny Graham; David Lawrence	October 9, 1978	T-409
153	6	"The Billfold Syndrome"	Alan Alda	Ken Levine & David Isaacs	October 16, 1978	T-405
154	7	"None Like it Hot"	Tony Mordente	Ken Levine & David Isaacs and Johnny Bonaduce	October 23, 1978	T-410
155	8	"They Call the Wind Korea"	Charles Dubin	Ken Levine & David Isaacs	October 30, 1978	T-407
156	9	"Major Ego"	Alan Alda	Larry Balmagia	November 6, 1978	T-412
157	10	"Baby, It's Cold Outside"	George Tyne	Gary David Goldberg	November 13, 1978	T-403
158	11	"Point of View"	Charles Dubin	Ken Levine & David Isaacs	November 20, 1978	T-415
159	12	"Dear Comrade"	Charles Dubin	Tom Reeder	November 27, 1978	T-413
160	13	"Out of Gas"	Mel Damski	Tom Reeder	December 4, 1978	T-411
161	14	"An Eye for a Tooth"	Charles Dubin	Ronny Graham	December 11, 1978	T-414
162	15	"Dear Sis"	Alan Alda	Alan Alda	December 18, 1978	T-417
163	16	"B.J. Papa San"	James Sheldon	Larry Balmagia	January 1, 1979	T-402
164	17	"Inga"	Alan Alda	Alan Alda	January 8, 1979	T-420
165	18	"The Price"	Charles Dubin	Erik Tarloff	January 15, 1979	T-418
166	19	"The Young and the Restless"	William Jurgensen	Mitch Markowitz	January 22, 1979	T-421
167	20	"Hot Lips is Back in Town"	Charles Dubin	Story by : Bernard Dilbert and Gary Markowitz; Teleplay by : Larry Balmagia and Bernard Dilbert	January 29, 1979	T-419
168	21	"C*A*V*E"	William Jurgensen	Larry Balmagia and Ronny Graham	February 5, 1979	T-423
169	22	"Rally Round the Flagg, Boys"	Harry Morgan	Mitch Markowitz	February 12, 1979	T-425
170	23	"Preventative Medicine"	Tony Mordente	Tom Reeder	February 19, 1979	T-416
171	24	"A Night at Rosie's"	Burt Metcalfe	Ken Levine & David Isaacs	February 26, 1979	T-426
172	25	"Ain't Love Grand?"	Mike Farrell	Ken Levine & David Isaacs	March 5, 1979	T-422
173	26	"The Party"	Burt Metcalfe	Alan Alda and Burt Metcalfe	March 12, 1979	T-424

=== Season 8 (1979–80) ===
No. overall	No. in season	Title	Directed by	Written by	Original release date	Prod. code
174	1	"Too Many Cooks"	Charles S. Dubin	Dennis Koenig	September 17, 1979	S-601
175	2	"Are You Now, Margaret?"	Charles S. Dubin	Thad Mumford & Dan Wilcox	September 24, 1979	S-602
176	3	"Guerrilla My Dreams"	Alan Alda	Bob Colleary	October 1, 1979	S-603
177	4	"Good Bye, Radar: Part 1"	Charles S. Dubin	Ken Levine & David Isaacs	October 8, 1979	S-610
178	5	"Good Bye, Radar: Part 2"	Charles S. Dubin	Ken Levine & David Isaacs	October 15, 1979	S-611
179	6	"Period of Adjustment"	Charles S. Dubin	Jim Mulligan & John Rappaport	October 22, 1979	S-604
180	7	"Nurse Doctor"	Charles S. Dubin	Story by : Sy Rosen; Teleplay by : Sy Rosen and Thad Mumford & Dan Wilcox	October 29, 1979	S-608
181	8	"Private Finance"	Charles S. Dubin	Dennis Koenig	November 5, 1979	S-605
182	9	"Mr. and Mrs. Who?"	Burt Metcalfe	Ronny Graham	November 12, 1979	S-606
183	10	"The Yalu Brick Road"	Charles S. Dubin	Mike Farrell	November 19, 1979	S-607
184	11	"Life Time"	Alan Alda	Alan Alda and Walter Dishell, M.D.	November 26, 1979	S-609
185	12	"Dear Uncle Abdul"	William Jurgensen	John Rappaport & Jim Mulligan	December 3, 1979	S-613
186	13	"Captains Outrageous"	Burt Metcalfe	Thad Mumford & Dan Wilcox	December 10, 1979	S-614
187	14	"Stars and Stripes"	Harry Morgan	Dennis Koenig	December 17, 1979	S-615
188	15	"Yessir, That's Our Baby"	Alan Alda	Jim Mulligan	December 31, 1979	S-617
189	16	"Bottle Fatigue"	Burt Metcalfe	Thad Mumford & Dan Wilcox	January 7, 1980	S-618
190	17	"Heal Thyself"	Mike Farrell	Story by : Dennis Koenig and Gene Reynolds; Teleplay by : Dennis Koenig	January 14, 1980	S-616
191	18	"Old Soldiers"	Charles S. Dubin	Dennis Koenig	January 21, 1980	S-620
192	19	"Morale Victory"	Charles S. Dubin	John Rappaport	January 28, 1980	S-619
193	20	"Lend a Hand"	Alan Alda	Story by : Alan Alda and Burt Metcalfe; Teleplay by : Alan Alda; Jim Mulligan & John Rappaport; Thad Mumford & Dan Wilcox	February 4, 1980	S-621
194	21	"Goodbye, Cruel World"	Charles S. Dubin	Thad Mumford & Dan Wilcox	February 11, 1980	S-622
195	22	"Dreams"	Alan Alda	Story by : Alan Alda and James Jay Rubinfier; Teleplay by : Alan Alda	February 18, 1980	S-612
196	23	"War Co-Respondent"	Mike Farrell	Mike Farrell	March 3, 1980	S-624
197	24	"Back Pay"	Burt Metcalfe	Thad Mumford & Dan Wilcox and Dennis Koenig	March 10, 1980	S-625
198	25	"April Fools"	Charles S. Dubin	Dennis Koenig	March 24, 1980	S-623

=== Season 9 (1980–81) ===
No. overall	No. in season	Title	Directed by	Written by	Original release date	Prod. code
199	1	"The Best of Enemies"	Charles S. Dubin	Sheldon Bull	November 17, 1980	Z-404
200	2	"Letters"	Charles S. Dubin	Dennis Koenig	November 24, 1980	Z-403
201	3	"Cementing Relationships"	Charles S. Dubin	David Pollock and Elias Davis	December 1, 1980	Z-401
202	4	"Father's Day"	Alan Alda	Karen Hall	December 8, 1980	Z-405
203	5	"Death Takes a Holiday"	Mike Farrell	Story by : Thad Mumford & Dan Wilcox and Burt Metcalfe; Teleplay by : Mike Farrell, John Rappaport and Dennis Koenig	December 15, 1980	Z-408
204	6	"A War for All Seasons"	Burt Metcalfe	Dan Wilcox & Thad Mumford	December 29, 1980	Z-409
205	7	"Your Retention, Please"	Charles S. Dubin	Erik Tarloff	January 5, 1981	Z-406
206	8	"Tell It to the Marines"	Harry Morgan	Hank Bradford	January 12, 1981	Z-410
207	9	"Taking the Fifth"	Charles S. Dubin	Elias Davis & David Pollock	January 19, 1981	Z-407
208	10	"Operation Friendship"	Rena Down	Dennis Koenig	January 26, 1981	Z-412
209	11	"No Sweat"	Burt Metcalfe	John Rappaport	February 2, 1981	Z-402
210	12	"Depressing News"	Alan Alda	Dan Wilcox & Thad Mumford	February 9, 1981	Z-411
211	13	"No Laughing Matter"	Burt Metcalfe	Elias Davis & David Pollock	February 16, 1981	Z-413
212	14	"Oh, How We Danced"	Burt Metcalfe	John Rappaport	February 23, 1981	Z-414
213	15	"Bottoms Up"	Alan Alda	Dennis Koenig	March 2, 1981	Z-415
214	16	"The Red/White Blues"	Gabrielle Beaumont	Elias Davis & David Pollock	March 9, 1981	Z-416
215	17	"Bless You, Hawkeye"	Nell Cox	Dan Wilcox & Thad Mumford	March 16, 1981	Z-417
216	18	"Blood Brothers"	Harry Morgan	David Pollock & Elias Davis	April 6, 1981	Z-421
217	19	"The Foresight Saga"	Charles S. Dubin	Dennis Koenig	April 13, 1981	Z-422
218	20	"The Life You Save"	Alan Alda	John Rappaport & Alan Alda	May 4, 1981	Z-418

=== Season 10 (1981–82) ===
No. overall	No. in season	Title	Directed by	Written by	Original release date	Prod. code
219	1	"That's Show Biz"	Charles S. Dubin	David Pollock & Elias Davis	October 26, 1981	Z-419
220	2	"That's Show Biz"	Charles S. Dubin	David Pollock & Elias Davis	October 26, 1981	Z-420
221	3	"Identity Crisis"	David Ogden Stiers	Dan Wilcox & Thad Mumford	November 2, 1981	Z-423
222	4	"Rumor at the Top"	Charles S. Dubin	David Pollock & Elias Davis	November 9, 1981	Z-424
223	5	"Give 'em Hell, Hawkeye"	Charles S. Dubin	Dennis Koenig	November 16, 1981	1-G01
224	6	"Wheelers and Dealers"	Charles S. Dubin	Thad Mumford & Dan Wilcox	November 23, 1981	1-G02
225	7	"Communication Breakdown"	Alan Alda	Karen Hall	November 30, 1981	1-G03
226	8	"Snap Judgment"	Hy Averback	Paul Perlove	December 7, 1981	1-G04
227	9	"Snappier Judgment"	Hy Averback	Paul Perlove	December 14, 1981	1-G05
228	10	"'Twas the Day After Christmas"	Burt Metcalfe	Elias Davis & David Pollock	December 28, 1981	1-G06
229	11	"Follies of the Living - Concerns of the Dead"	Alan Alda	Alan Alda	January 4, 1982	1-G07
230	12	"The Birthday Girls"	Charles S. Dubin	Karen Hall	January 11, 1982	1-G08
231	13	"Blood and Guts"	Charles S. Dubin	Lee H. Grant	January 18, 1982	1-G09
232	14	"A Holy Mess"	Burt Metcalfe	David Pollock and Elias Davis	February 1, 1982	1-G10
233	15	"The Tooth Shall Set You Free"	Charles S. Dubin	David Pollock and Elias Davis	February 8, 1982	1G-11
234	16	"Pressure Points"	Charles S. Dubin	David Pollock and Elias Davis	February 15, 1982	1G-12
235	17	"Where There's a Will, There's a War"	Alan Alda	David Pollock and Elias Davis	February 22, 1982	1G-13
236	18	"Promotion Commotion"	Charles S. Dubin	Dennis Koenig	March 1, 1982	1G-14
237	19	"Heroes"	Nell Cox	Thad Mumford & Dan Wilcox	March 15, 1982	1G-15
238	20	"Sons and Bowlers"	Hy Averback	Elias Davis & David Pollock	March 22, 1982	1G-16
239	21	"Picture This"	Burt Metcalfe	Karen Hall	April 5, 1982	1G-17
240	22	"That Darn Kid"	David Ogden Stiers	Karen Hall	April 12, 1982	1G-19

=== Season 11 (1982–83) ===
No. overall	No. in season	Title	Directed by	Written by	Original release date	Prod. code
241	1	"Hey, Look Me Over"	Susan Oliver	Alan Alda and Karen Hall	October 25, 1982	1G-21
242	2	"Trick or Treatment"	Charles S. Dubin	Dennis Koenig	November 1, 1982	9-B01
243	3	"Foreign Affairs"	Charles S. Dubin	David Pollock & Elias Davis	November 8, 1982	1G-22
244	4	"The Joker Is Wild"	Burt Metcalfe	John Rappaport and Dennis Koenig	November 15, 1982	1G-24
245	5	"Who Knew?"	Harry Morgan	Elias Davis & David Pollock	November 22, 1982	1G-18
246	6	"Bombshells"	Charles S. Dubin	Dan Wilcox & Thad Mumford	November 29, 1982	9-B02
247	7	"Settling Debts"	Michael Switzer	Thad Mumford & Dan Wilcox	December 6, 1982	1G-23
248	8	"The Moon Is Not Blue"	Charles S. Dubin	Larry Balmagia	December 13, 1982	1G-20
249	9	"Run for the Money"	Nell Cox	Story by : Mike Farrell and Elias Davis & David Pollock; Teleplay by : Elias Davis & David Pollock	December 20, 1982	9-B03
250	10	"U.N., the Night and the Music"	Harry Morgan	Elias Davis & David Pollock	January 3, 1983	9-B06
251	11	"Strange Bedfellows"	Mike Farrell	Karen Hall	January 10, 1983	9-B07
252	12	"Say No More"	Charles S. Dubin	John Rappaport	January 24, 1983	9-B08
253	13	"Friends and Enemies"	Jamie Farr	Karen Hall	February 7, 1983	9-B05
254	14	"Give and Take"	Charles S. Dubin	Dennis Koenig	February 14, 1983	9-B09
255	15	"As Time Goes By"	Burt Metcalfe	Dan Wilcox & Thad Mumford	February 21, 1983	9-B10
256	16	"Goodbye, Farewell and Amen"	Alan Alda	Alan Alda; Burt Metcalfe; John Rappaport; Dan Wilcox & Thad Mumford; Elias Davis & David Pollock; Karen Hall	February 28, 1983	9-B04

== See also ==
- List of most-watched television broadcasts
