= M*A*S*H season 1 =

M*A*S*H
- Season 1
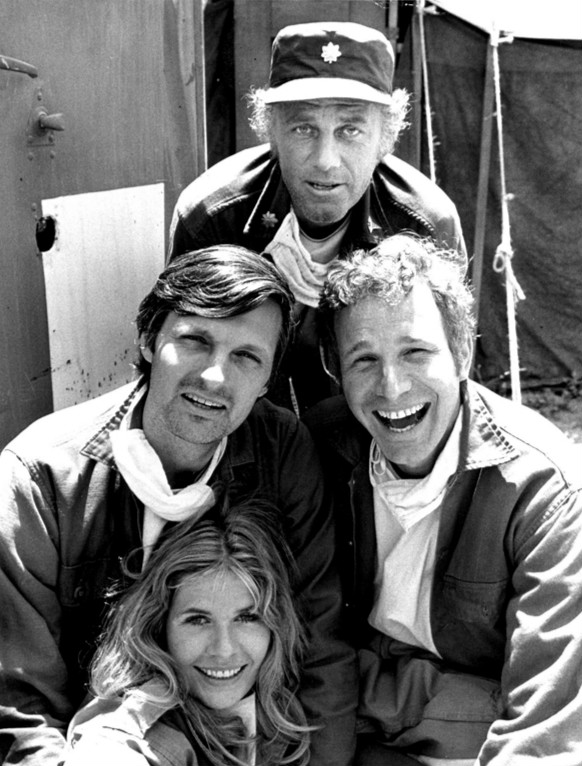
- clockwise: Loretta Swit, Alan Alda, McLean Stevenson and Wayne Rogers, 1972.
- No. of episodes: 24

Release
- Original network: CBS
- Original release: September 17, 1972 – March 25, 1973

Season chronology
- Next → Season 2

The first season of M*A*S*H premiered on September 17, 1972 on CBS and concluded its 24-episode season on March 25, 1973. This season aired Sundays at 8:00–8:30 pm on CBS.

== Cast ==
=== Main ===
- Alan Alda as Capt. Benjamin Franklin "Hawkeye" Pierce
- Wayne Rogers as Capt. "Trapper" John MacIntyre
- McLean Stevenson as Lt. Col. Henry Blake
- Loretta Swit as Maj. Margaret "Hot Lips" Houlihan
- Larry Linville as Maj. Frank "Ferret Face" Burns
- Gary Burghoff as Cpl. Walter "Radar" O'Reilly

=== Recurring ===
Characters marked with the symbol '‡' were seen only during the first season, and were written out of the show without explanation.

- Patrick Adiarte as Ho-Jon ‡
- Sorrell Booke as Brg. Gen. Bradley Barker ‡
- Timothy Brown as Capt. 'Spearchucker' Jones ‡
- Odessa Cleveland as Lt. Ginger Bayliss
- Jamie Farr as Cpl. Maxwell Klinger
- Harvey J. Goldenberg and Jack Riley as Cpt. Harvey Kaplan ‡
- Bonnie Jones as Lt. Barbara Bannerman ‡
- Bruno Kirby (pilot only) and Bob Gooden as Pvt. Lorenzo Boone ‡
- Linda Meiklejohn as Lt. Leslie Scorch
- George Morgan (pilot only) and William Christopher as Lt. Father Francis Mulcahy
- John Orchard as Capt. 'Ugly John' Black ‡
- Karen Philipp as Lt. Maggie Dish ‡
- Marcia Strassman as Lt. Margie Cutler ‡
- Herb Voland as Brg. Gen. Crandell Clayton
- G. Wood as Brig. Gen. Hamilton Hammond ‡

== Episodes ==
No. overall	No. in season	Title (Note: Titles taken from DVD)	Directed by (Note: Credits from episode title cards)	Written by	Original release date	Prod. code (Note: Production Code from end credits)
1	1	"Pilot"	Gene Reynolds	Larry Gelbart	September 17, 1972	Z-9522
Timeline 1950: Army surgeons Hawkeye Pierce (Alan Alda) and Trapper MacIntyre (Wayne Rogers) hold a raffle to raise tuition for the Swamp's Korean houseboy while their commanding officer Henry Blake (McLean Stevenson) is away. The prize is a weekend with nurse Lt. Dish. To keep Major Frank Burns out of the way, he is sedated. This episode features George Morgan in his only appearance as Father Mulcahy.
2	2	"To Market, to Market"	Michael O'Herlihy	Burt Styler	September 24, 1972	J-303
Hawkeye and Trapper get into black marketing for medical supplies and offer Henry's antique oak desk as payment, after the supplies are hijacked. Episode features Jack Soo, who would later appear in the series Barney Miller.
3	3	"Requiem for a Lightweight"	Hy Averback	Robert Klane	October 1, 1972	J-308
Trapper goes into the boxing ring against another unit's thug in a deal with Henry to keep a nurse, Lt. Cutler at the 4077th. Hawkeye comes up with a plan to equal the odds. Frank tries to upset Hawkeye's plan but it backfires. This episode marks the first appearance of William Christopher as Father Francis Mulcahy.
4	4	"Chief Surgeon Who?"	E.W. Swackhamer	Larry Gelbart	October 8, 1972	J-307
Hawkeye is named chief surgeon of the 4077th, to the great chagrin of Frank Burns and Margaret Houlihan. Jamie Farr is introduced as the cross-dressing Corporal Maxwell Q. Klinger. Sorrell Booke, later star in The Dukes of Hazzard, plays the visiting general. William Christopher does not appear in this episode.
5	5	"The Moose"	Hy Averback	Laurence Marks	October 15, 1972	J-305
Hawkeye and Trapper plot to free a Korean girl from serving a GI. Larry Linville, Loretta Swit and William Christopher do not appear in this episode.
6	6	"Yankee Doodle Doctor"	Lee Philips	Laurence Marks	October 22, 1972	J-310
Hawkeye declares a filmmaker's documentary about the 4077th to be propaganda and decides to make his own, with characters based on Groucho Marx and Harpo Marx. Ed Flanders, later star of St. Elsewhere, plays the filmmaker. William Christopher does not appear in this episode.
7	7	"Bananas, Crackers and Nuts"	Bruce Bilson	Burt Styler	November 5, 1972	J-311
Hawkeye goes crazier than usual when he doesn't get his R&R, so a shrink (Stuart Margolin) is brought in to examine him. William Christopher does not appear in this episode.
8	8	"Cowboy"	Don Weis	Robert Klane	November 12, 1972	J-309
A series of so-called "accidents" makes it clear that someone wants Henry dead. Loretta Swit does not appear in this episode.
9	9	"Henry, Please Come Home"	William Wiard	Laurence Marks	November 19, 1972	J-302
Henry gets transferred to softer duty as a reward for the 4077th's high efficiency rating, but Hawkeye and Trapper scheme to bring him back once they realize Frank will be the replacement commanding officer. Loretta Swit does not appear in this episode.
10	10	"I Hate a Mystery"	Hy Averback	Hal Dresner	November 26, 1972	J-306
Hawkeye is the prime suspect in a series of thefts at the 4077th.
11	11	"Germ Warfare"	Terry Becker	Larry Gelbart	December 10, 1972	J-304
Hawkeye and Trapper take a sample of Frank's blood while he's sleeping, but the recipient starts showing signs of hepatitis. William Christopher does not appear in this episode.
12	12	"Dear Dad"	Gene Reynolds	Larry Gelbart	December 17, 1972	J-313
It's Christmas time at the 4077th, and Hawkeye is writing a letter to his father about the activities at the camp.
13	13	"Edwina"	James Sheldon	Hal Dresner	December 24, 1972	J-312
The nurses declare themselves off-limits until their colleague Edwina (Arlene Golonka), an incurable klutz, gets a date with one of the soldiers – and Hawkeye is it. William Christopher does not appear in this episode.
14	14	"Love Story"	Earl Bellamy	Laurence Marks	January 7, 1973	J-314
Radar receives a "Dear John" record, then seeks advice from Hawkeye when he falls for a nurse (Kelly Jean Peters) with a taste for the classics. William Christopher does not appear in this episode.
15	15	"Tuttle"	William Wiard	Bruce Shelly & David Ketchum	January 14, 1973	J-315
Hawkeye and Trapper invent an imaginary captain to cover their donations to an orphanage. This episode marks the only time the character "Sparky," with whom Radar frequently communicates by phone, is actually seen on screen. He's portrayed by Dennis Fimple. Bruce Shelly and David Ketchum received a Writers Guild Award nomination for this episode.
16	16	"The Ringbanger"	Jackie Cooper	Jerry Mayer	January 21, 1973	J-316
While a colonel with a high casualty record (Leslie Nielsen) is recovering in post-op, Hawkeye and Trapper conspire to keep him out of action. William Christopher does not appear in this episode.
17	17	"Sometimes You Hear the Bullet"	William Wiard	Carl Kleinschmitt	January 28, 1973	J-318
Hawkeye's emotions run high when an old friend (James Callahan) comes to South Korea to write a book about the war; meanwhile, a private (Ron Howard) turns out to have faked his age to enlist. Carl Kleinschmitt received a Writers Guild Award nomination for this episode.
18	18	"Dear Dad...Again"	Jackie Cooper	Sheldon Keller & Larry Gelbart	February 4, 1973	J-317
Hawkeye writes another letter to his father detailing incidents at the 4077th. Note: In the conclusion of his letter, Hawkeye asks his father to give his mother and sister a kiss, but later in the series Hawkeye is said to be an only child and his mother is deceased.
19	19	"The Long-John Flap"	William Wiard	Alan Alda	February 18, 1973	J-319
A pair of long-johns sent to Hawkeye by his father becomes a hot commodity at the 4077th during a cold snap, as they're passed from person to person.
20	20	"The Army-Navy Game"	Gene Reynolds	Story by : McLean Stevenson; Teleplay by : Sid Dorfman	February 25, 1973	J-322
The 4077th gears up for the annual Army-Navy game until an unexploded shell hits the compound. Note: The first of three consecutive episodes that would feature a 'jazzier' version of the opening theme song Suicide is Painless. After that, the theme would return to the more familiar version.
21	21	"Sticky Wicket"	Don Weis	Story by : Richard Baer; Teleplay by : Laurence Marks and Larry Gelbart	March 4, 1973	J-321
Hawkeye obsesses over a patient who isn't recovering as expected.
22	22	"Major Fred C. Dobbs"	Don Weis	Sid Dorfman	March 11, 1973	J-320
Hawkeye and Trapper's constant pranks finally prompt Frank to request a transfer. That is, until he hears rumors about gold in the hills near the camp.
23	23	"Ceasefire"	Earl Bellamy	Story by : Robert Klane; Teleplay by : Laurence Marks & Larry Gelbart	March 18, 1973	J-323
An unconfirmed report of the war ending sparks celebrations, but Trapper is the sole doubter.
24	24	"Showtime"	Jackie Cooper	Story by : Larry Gelbart; Teleplay by : Robert Klane & Larry Gelbart	March 25, 1973	J-324
The 4077th go through various dramas while a traveling USO troupe arrives to provide entertainment.
