= Dear Dad... Three =

- M*A*S*H episode
- Episode no.: Season 2 Episode 9
- Directed by: Don Weis
- Written by: Larry Gelbart; Laurence Marks
- Production code: K409
- Original air date: November 10, 1973

Guest appearances
- Mills Watson – Condon; Odessa Cleveland – Lt. Ginger Bayliss; Kathleen Hughes – Lorraine Blake

Episode chronology
← Previous "The Trial of Henry Blake"	Next → "The Sniper"
- M*A*S*H season 2

"Dear Dad... Three" is the ninth episode of the second season of the American television series M*A*S*H, and the 33rd episode overall. The episode's title follows the format of two episodes from the show's first season: "Dear Dad" and "Dear Dad...Again". "Dear Dad... Three" aired on November 10, 1973.

== Plot ==
Hawkeye writes another letter home to his father, detailing some of the recent events at the 4077th: amongst the latest batch of wounded is a soldier with a live grenade shot into his body, and Sergeant Condon, who reminds the doctors to give him the "right color" blood. Hawkeye, Trapper and Ginger decide to teach Condon a lesson on racism. The monthly staff meeting was also held—-although the previous meeting was held six months earlier—and the latest meeting appears to be no more productive than the previous one, which, according to Radar's minutes, was "declared a shambles". Henry also receives a home movie of his daughter's birthday party from his wife, which he watches in his office with Hawkeye, Trapper and Radar-—along with footage from a few years previously of Henry and his wife goofing in front of the camera with their neighbors.

== Notes ==
"Dear Dad... Three" was the first of four episodes to feature home movies in the episode plot. The season three episode "There is Nothing Like a Nurse" featured the main male characters, minus Frank Burns, watching a home movie of Frank's wedding. The season four episode "Mail Call...Again" featured the main characters watching a movie of Radar's family sitting down to Sunday lunch at the family farm in Ottumwa, Iowa. The season nine episode "Oh, How We Danced" featured the main characters throwing a surprise anniversary party for B.J. and showing him a movie his wife Peg made for him based on surreptitiously-made recordings Hawkeye made of B.J. describing a routine day in the life of the Hunnicutt home.

This episode also contains a claim that Dr. Charles Drew [died April 1, 1950], known for his pioneering work with blood plasma, died in a North Carolina hospital which refused to admit him or treat his injuries based on his race. This claim, although widely repeated, is false.
