= Requiem for a Lightweight =

- M*A*S*H episode
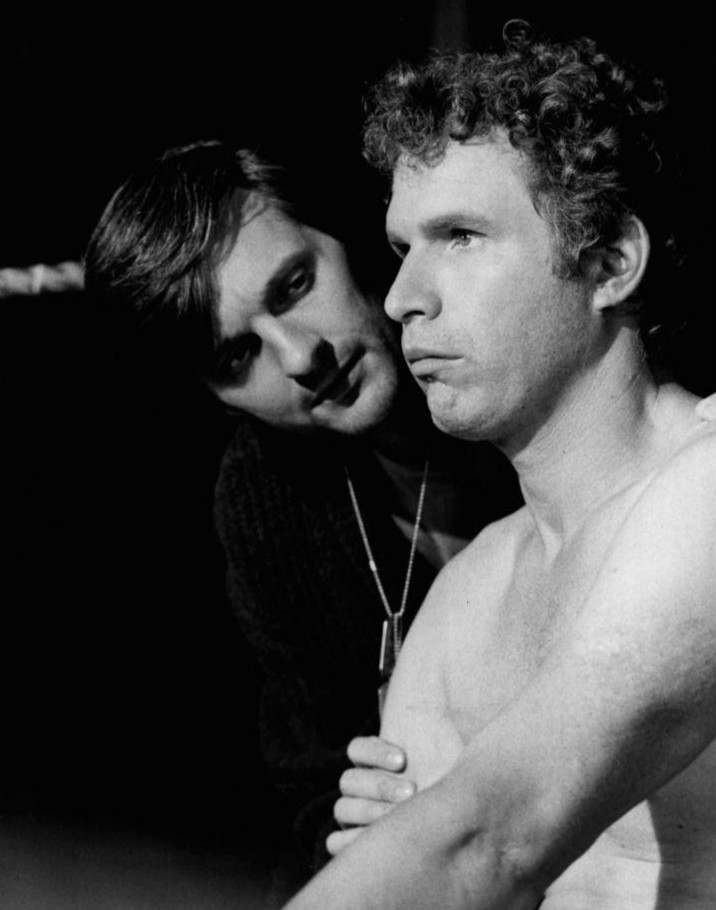
- Trapper in the ring with manager Hawkeye
- Episode no.: Season 1 Episode 3
- Directed by: Hy Averback
- Written by: Robert Klane
- Production code: J308
- Original air date: October 1, 1972

Guest appearances
- Sorrell Booke as Brigadier General Barker; John Orchard as Ugly John; Marcia Strassman as Margie Cutler; William Christopher as Father Mulcahy

Episode chronology
← Previous "To Market, to Market"	Next → "Chief Surgeon Who?"
- M*A*S*H season 1

"Requiem for a Lightweight" is the third episode of the television series M*A*S*H. It was first aired on October 1, 1972 and was repeated on December 31, 1972, the first episode of M*A*S*H to do so. In Watching M*A*S*H, Watching America, a sociological examination of M*A*S*H as an illustration of shifting American values in the 1970s and early 1980s, James H. Wittebols cites this episode as an example of the sexual humor which was common in early M*A*S*H episodes, but downplayed later in the program's history.

A new nurse named Margie Cutler arrives at the 4077. Realizing Cutler is an incredible distraction for Pierce and McIntyre, Major Houlihan has her transferred to another unit. Hawkeye and Trapper, desperate to get her back, agree to have Trapper fight in a boxing tournament. To secure victory, Ugly John shows Hawkeye and Trapper how to coat one of the boxing gloves in ether, but Burns and Houlihan, looking to foul them up, swap the ether for water. Hawkeye, realizing what they did, quickly gets more ether, coats Trapper's glove, allowing him to "knock out" his opponent.

This episode's title is a parody of Requiem for a Heavyweight, a 1956 episode of Playhouse 90 starring Jack Palance as a washed up professional boxer. Requiem for a Heavyweight was made into a theatrical film starring Anthony Quinn in 1962.

== Plot ==
After meeting new nurse Margie Cutler together, Hawkeye and Trapper each are determined to become her lover. While they are all discussing surgical procedures in the mess tent Major Houlihan tells Cutler she needs to see her. After they leave, Hawkeye and Trapper both try to let on that they're going back to sleep or work. However, they both go to Cutler's tent and find her packing her things; Houlihan had her transferred to another unit because she was a distraction.

Hawkeye and Trapper go to Col. Blake's office to demand that Cutler's transfer be stopped. He tells them that Major Houlihan makes all the decisions about the nursing staff, but if one of them would box in the tournament he's having with Brigadier General Barker, he would see what he could do. After sadly watching Cutler drive off in a jeep, Trapper decides to fight.

Hawkeye spends some time training Trapper but neither are really confident about winning, especially after they discover Trapper has a "glass stomach". While the two are relaxing in the Swamp, Radar comes in and tells them that Trapper's opponent has arrived and that he heard that the guy is remarkably tough. They decide the only way Trapper is going to survive is if they cheat. Ugly John's plan is to rub ether on Trapper's boxing glove and then to get his opponent in a clinch so that the ether's fumes will knock him out.

Later on, Pierce, McIntyre, Blake and Burns are sitting in the mess tent talking when General Barker and his boxer come in. After they leave, Henry asks Trapper if he wants to reconsider and Hawkeye tells Henry and Frank about their plan to use ether. During the introductions of the boxing match, Burns and Houlihan switch the ether with distilled water. When Trapper gets clobbered in the first round, Hawkeye discovers the switch and runs to get real ether. During the second round, Trapper, with real ether on his glove, gets his opponent in a clinch, until he falls out of the ring, out cold, on top of Burns and Houlihan. Henry holds up his end of the bargain and gets Cutler transferred back to the 4077, where she is so impressed that Trapper fought for her, she completely ignores Hawkeye.

This episode marks the first appearance of William Christopher as Father Mulcahy rather than George Morgan, who had had the role in the pilot episode. William Christopher would later become a regular cast member with his name in the opening credits. Also first appearing in this episode is Marcia Strassman as Lt. Margie Cutler, a nurse assigned to the 4077. She would be the central target of Hawkeye's desires for the first season, but would not appear further in the series.

Sorrell Booke, who portrayed visiting General Barker, was a veteran of the Korean War. He would reappear in the following episode as the same character.
