= Sticky Wicket =

- M*A*S*H episode
- Episode no.: Season 1 Episode 21
- Directed by: Don Weis
- Story by: Richard Baer
- Teleplay by: Laurence Marks; Larry Gelbart
- Production code: J321
- Original air date: March 4, 1973

Episode chronology
← Previous "The Army-Navy Game"	Next → "Major Fred C. Dobbs"
- M*A*S*H season 1

"Sticky Wicket" is the 21st episode of the first season of the TV series M*A*S*H. written by Richard Baer with the teleplay written by Laurence Marks and Larry Gelbart, it originally aired on CBS-TV on March 4, 1973.

== Plot ==
The episode opens in a poker game. When it is interrupted by incoming wounded, Hawkeye and Margaret operate on a patient and Hawkeye insults Frank. However, Hawkeye's patient fails to improve after surgery. Hawkeye becomes overly concerned with the case, to the point of attacking Frank over comments at lunch, sleeping in post-op, snapping at Trapper for playing poker too loudly, and moving out of the Swamp to the supply tent. While Hawkeye retreats to the supply tent to reflect on the case, he is interrupted by his date (whom he turns away), Trapper (whom he turns away as well), two other soldiers, and Henry. Henry implies that Hawkeye is concerned more about his ego than about his patient. Hawkeye replies with a glib remark about Henry's intelligence, which ultimately insults Henry and allows Hawkeye some peace and quiet. While pondering the case outside the supply tent, Hawkeye encounters Margaret and she theorizes that they made a mistake during surgery, eliciting extreme doubt from Hawkeye, who in turn insults her. During the night, Hawkeye has an epiphany and reopens the patient to find a small piece of shrapnel damage behind the sigmoid colon, at which point Frank states that "anybody could have missed that." Hawkeye responds with a sincere "Thanks, Frank."

== Guest cast ==
- John Orchard – Ugly John

== Production notes ==
This episode features an alternate, jazzier arrangement of the opening theme music.

Trapper makes a pun during the poker game comparing a "pair of twos" with paregoric.

B movies referred to are Love Life of a Gorilla (1940), Bride of the Gorilla (1951), Bedtime for Bonzo (1951) and Bonzo Goes to College (1952).
