= Valentine's Day (TV series) =

Sitcom (1964–65)

- Created by: Hal Kanter
- Starring: Anthony Franciosa; Jack Soo; Jerry Hausner; Mimi Dillard; Eddie Quillan; Janet Waldo
- Composer: Jeff Alexander
- Country of origin: United States
- Original language: English
- No. of seasons: 1
- No. of episodes: 34

Production
- Executive producer: Hal Kanter
- Running time: 30 minutes
- Production companies: Savannah Productions; Yorktan Productions; 20th Century Fox Television

Original release
- Network: ABC
- Release: September 18, 1964 – May 7, 1965

Valentine's Day is an American sitcom that aired on ABC from September 18, 1964 until May 7, 1965. The series starred Tony Franciosa as Valentine Farrow, a swinging Manhattan publishing executive, and Jack Soo as Rocky Sin, a poker-playing con-artist and Farrow's valet. The show was created by Hal Kanter and lasted only one season.

One noteworthy episode was produced as a tie-in to the movie Rio Conchos, in which Franciosa co-starred; he played both Valentine and his character, Juan Luis Martinez, from the feature.

== Cast ==
- Anthony Franciosa as Valentine Farrow
- Jack Soo as Rockwell "Rocky" Sin
- Janet Waldo as Libby Freeman
- Jerry Hausner as O.D. Dunstall
- Mimi Dillard as Molly
- Eddie Quillan as Grover Cleveland Fipple
- Jim Nabors as Hank Smith
- Bill Bixby as Carl Pierce

== Episodes ==
No.	Title	Directed by	Written by	Original release date
1	TBA	Unknown	Unknown	September 18, 1964
2	TBA	Unknown	Unknown	September 25, 1964
3	"How to Live Without Dying"	Unknown	Unknown	October 2, 1964
4	"Triple Trouble"	Unknown	Unknown	October 9, 1964
5	"Call Me No Cabs"	George Marshall	Hal Kanter	October 16, 1964
6	"If Africa Speaks, Don't Answer"	Unknown	Unknown	October 23, 1964
7	"The Baritone Canary"	Unknown	Unknown	October 30, 1964
8	"The Old School Tie"	Unknown	Unknown	November 6, 1964
9	"Yen Ku Horowitz"	Unknown	Unknown	November 13, 1964
10	"The Hottest Game in Town"	H. Bruce Humberstone	Unknown	November 20, 1964
11	"Bride and Gloom"	Unknown	Unknown	November 27, 1964
12	"Cherry Blossoms in New York"	Unknown	Unknown	December 4, 1964
13	"Teahouse of the Bankrupt Moon"	Unknown	Unknown	December 11, 1964
14	"The Seasick Sailor"	Unknown	Unknown	December 18, 1964
15	"All Through the Night"	Unknown	Unknown	December 25, 1964
16	"Follow the Broken Pretzel"	Unknown	Unknown	January 1, 1965
17	"The Double Shamaguchi"	Unknown	Unknown	January 8, 1965
18	"The Sweet Smell of Wampum"	Unknown	Unknown	January 15, 1965
19	"Which Witch?"	Unknown	Unknown	January 22, 1965
20	"Two Weeks with Pay"	Barry Shear	David P. Harmon	January 29, 1965
21	"All Right, Louie, Drop That Blue Pencil"	Unknown	Unknown	February 5, 1965
22	"For Me and My Sal"	Unknown	Unknown	February 12, 1965
23	"Sin Has Two Faces"	Unknown	Unknown	February 19, 1965
24	"Mad, Mad Momma"	Unknown	Unknown	February 26, 1965
