= Major Fred C. Dobbs =

- M*A*S*H episode
- Episode no.: Season 1 Episode 22
- Directed by: Don Weis
- Written by: Sid Dorfman
- Production code: J320
- Original air date: March 11, 1973

Episode chronology
← Previous "Sticky Wicket"	Next → "Ceasefire"
- M*A*S*H season 1

"Major Fred C. Dobbs" is the 22nd episode of the first season of the TV series M*A*S*H. It originally aired on March 11, 1973.

== Plot ==
After witnessing Frank's unfair berating of nurse Ginger Bayliss (Odessa Cleveland), Hawkeye and Trapper console Ginger and set Frank up for one of their "getting even" pranks. This latest scheme succeeds where no other one has, as Frank finally demands that he be transferred to another unit. But when another prank embarrasses both Frank and Margaret over the P.A. system, she also demands a transfer. Hawkeye and Trapper are glad to be rid of the pair at first, but then learn that they will have to work double shifts until replacements arrive. To trick Frank into staying, the two surgeons lead him to believe that large deposits of gold can be found near the camp. His greed gets the better of him and he withdraws his transfer request, after which Hawkeye and Trapper humiliate him again by driving past him in a jeep that they have painted gold.

== Notes ==
The title of this episode is a reference to the John Huston film The Treasure of the Sierra Madre, in which Fred C. Dobbs (Humphrey Bogart) becomes consumed with greed — a weakness to which Hawkeye and Trapper appeal in order to keep Frank from actually leaving.

The plot device of Radar O'Reilly planting a microphone in Margaret's tent and embarrassing her and Frank by broadcasting them over the camp PA system originally appeared in the original MASH film.

Some original M*A*S*H production personnel consider this to be the worst episode of the series, centering as it does on Hawkeye and Trapper trying to keep Majors Burns and Houlihan at the 4077th. Alan Alda referred to it as "a low point".

Hawkeye makes a reference to his favorite soap opera, Just Plain MacArthur, a reference to a real radio soap from the Golden Age called Just Plain Bill.

The PA announcement tells of a movie to be shown Greed (film) an actual 1924 silent film classic.

This was the last episode to have the "jazzier" version of the theme song playing during the credits.
