= Yankee Doodle Doctor =

- M*A*S*H episode
- Episode no.: Season 1 Episode 6
- Directed by: Lee Philips
- Written by: Laurence Marks
- Production code: J310
- Original air date: October 22, 1972

Guest appearances
- Ed Flanders; Bert Kramer; Tom Sparks; Marcia Strassman; Herb Voland

Episode chronology
← Previous "The Moose"	Next → "Bananas, Crackers and Nuts"
- M*A*S*H season 1

"Yankee Doodle Doctor" is the sixth episode of the television series M*A*S*H. It was first broadcast on October 22, 1972, and was rerun April 8, 1973. It was written by Laurence Marks and directed by Lee Philips.

The guest cast includes Ed Flanders as Lt. Bricker, Bert Kramer as Sgt. Martin, Tom Sparks as Corpsman, Marcia Strassman as Nurse Margie Cutler, and Herb Voland as Brig. Gen. Crandell Clayton.

== Plot ==
Lieutenant Bricker is making a documentary about Mobile Army Surgical Hospital (MASH) units, and General Clayton recommends the 4077th. However, when Hawkeye and Trapper discover the "documentary" is little more than Army propaganda, they destroy it and make their own version.

Bricker wants one of the doctors to "star" in his documentary, and Hawkeye Pierce agrees when faced with the possibility that the role could go to Frank Burns. Discovering that the documentary is turgid propaganda, Pierce and McIntyre destroy the film at night by exposing it to light. They persuade Blake to let them make their own film and turn it into a comedy, casting Hawkeye as a Groucho Marx-type doctor, Trapper as a Harpo Marx-esque surgeon, and Radar as their hapless patient. The final scene is a somber monologue by Hawkeye about the grim realities of war, delivered at the bedside of a patient in the post-op ward.

Blake is mortified and Clayton is initially unimpressed, while the rest of the crowd loves the film. Afterward, Clayton tells Blake to destroy it but save one copy for him, so that he can have something to laugh at once the war is over. He also intends to use the final scene in his own documentary.

== Themes and reception ==
This is one of the first episodes of M*A*S*H to deal strongly with anti-war themes. In April 1973, this episode was cited by Newsweek as an example of "irony at its most abrasive".
