= Chief Surgeon Who? =

- M*A*S*H episode
- Episode no.: Season 1 Episode 4
- Directed by: E.W. Swackhamer
- Written by: Larry Gelbart
- Production code: J307
- Original air date: October 8, 1972

Guest appearances
- Sorrell Booke as Brigadier General Barker; Timothy Brown as Spearchucker; John Orchard as Ugly John; Jamie Farr as Klinger; Jack Riley as Capt. Kaplan; Linda Meiklejohn as Leslie; Bob Gooden as Boone; Odessa Cleveland as Ginger

Episode chronology
← Previous "Requiem for a Lightweight"	Next → "The Moose"
- M*A*S*H season 1

"Chief Surgeon Who?" is the fourth episode of the television series M*A*S*H.

After complaints about the surgeons' practical jokes during surgical sessions, Col. Blake decides to appoint a chief surgeon. Despite protests from Majors Burns and Houlihan, he chooses Hawkeye. In retaliation, the majors bring a General to the camp to inspect Hawkeye's work.

== Plot ==
After a long O.R. session, Major Burns complains to Col. Blake that the surgeons respect Hawkeye more than him, even though Burns outranks him. In response, Col. Blake appoints Hawkeye as chief surgeon, to consult on all shifts. Burns is furious over the choice, believing that the position should be determined by rank and that, as the highest ranking surgeon (and the unit's second-in-command), he should automatically receive the position. Blake refuses to reconsider, reminding Burns that Hawkeye has two specialty certifications and that he performs better when "the heat's on". An angry Burns promises to bring plenty of heat to his commanding officer, and he and Major Houlihan go over his head to General Bradley Barker in the hopes that he will overrule Blake and name Burns the chief surgeon.

The general arrives just after the entire camp, with the exception of the two majors, have thrown a massive party for Hawkeye, and are now finishing off with sex, drinking, and gambling. Major Burns informs him that a badly wounded patient has been waiting in surgery for half an hour while Hawkeye is playing poker. When the general confronts Hawkeye, he orders him to perform the surgery. Hawkeye refuses, explaining to Barker that when the patient came into the 4077th, his condition made him too great a risk to operate immediately. Hawkeye also informs the general that he will not perform the operation until the patient is stabilized unless an emergency arises and that Barker is free to take over treatment if he desires.

Furious at Hawkeye's perceived insubordination, Barker storms across the compound looking for Col. Blake. He proceeds to inspect the entire camp and finds disrespect for military authority at every turn, including Corporal Klinger, who is wearing a dress while on guard duty. By the time he finds Blake, Hawkeye has gone to the OR and Barker asks him about the condition of his patient. Hawkeye responds by telling Barker the patient is stable and ready for surgery. As Barker observes the surgery, he realizes Hawkeye is more than qualified for his chief surgeon position and that his choice to wait to operate was the right decision. For this reason, he drops all the charges he had intended to press. General Barker also advised Col. Blake to give Major Burns "a high colonic and send him on a ten mile hike" as a punishment for Burns and Houlihan calling him to the 4077th and wasting his time.

Later on Burns is operating and asks Hawkeye to assist. Hawkeye walks over and says to Frank, "I'm ready, doctor."

== Production ==
It was first broadcast on October 8, 1972 and was repeated twice during the series' original run, on April 15 and July 29, 1973. It was written by Larry Gelbart, who won a Writers Guild Award for it, and directed by E.W. Swackhamer. This episode marks the first appearance of Jamie Farr as Corporal Maxwell Klinger.

== Reception ==
In Watching M*A*S*H, Watching America, a sociological examination of M*A*S*H as an illustration of shifting American values in the 1970s and early 1980s, James H. Wittebols cites this episode as an example of the satirizing of hypocritical authority figures.
