= To Market, to Market (M*A*S*H) =

- M*A*S*H episode
- Episode no.: Season 1 Episode 2
- Directed by: Michael O'Herlihy
- Written by: Burt Styler
- Production code: J303
- Original air date: September 24, 1972

Guest appearances
- Jack Soo as Charlie Lee; Robert Ito as Lin; G. Wood as Brigadier General Hammond; Odessa Cleveland as Ginger; John C. Johnson as Truck Driver

Episode chronology
← Previous "Pilot"	Next → "Requiem for a Lightweight"
- M*A*S*H season 1

"To Market, to Market" is the second episode of M*A*S*H. It was first aired on September 24, 1972 and repeated on April 29, 1973. Like many other M*A*S*H episodes, this one parodies army bureaucracy.

Thieves and blackmarketeers hold up a truck load of medical supplies for the 4077, thus rendering them in desperate need of hydrocortisone. In retaliation, Hawkeye and Trapper meet with a notorious black marketeer, hoping to get some replacements. When they realize they have nothing reasonable to trade with him, they go to drastic measures to get what they need.

== Plot ==
While operating on a general, Hawkeye discovers that the hospital is out of hydrocortisone. He and Trapper later learn that it has been stolen by black marketeers, along with half of the other medical supplies and an entire replacement shipment. When they go to Henry's office to complain, they find him showing off a newly acquired, 100-year-old oak desk. Henry is too nervous to call General Hammond and demand action, so Hawkeye makes the call for him; however, Hammond refuses Henry's request for a fresh shipment.

Radar puts the doctors in touch with a black marketeer, Charlie Lee, who asks $10,000 for a load of hydrocortisone he has in stock. The price is too high for Hawkeye and Trapper, so they offer to trade for Henry's desk. Charlie later visits the 4077th, dressed as a South Korean general, in order to examine the desk. He agrees to the trade, on the condition that the desk must be ready to load onto a truck early the next morning; if it is not, he will sell the hydrocortisone to another buyer.

Radar wakes Hawkeye and Trapper an hour ahead of the pickup so they can sneak into Henry's office and get the desk. Hearing the noises of their attempt to move it, Frank and Margaret separately approach the office to investigate. Upon finding one another, they rendezvous in the supply tent and lock the office door, leaving Hawkeye and Trapper with no way out. As Radar tries to persuade Charlie's truck driver to wait, the doctors take down one wall of the office and carry the desk out. Before they can get it onto the truck, though, Frank recognizes the driver from Charlie's previous visit and orders him off the base. With the truck now gone, Hawkeye tells Radar to call in a chopper pilot, who airlifts the desk out of the office and flies away to deliver it to Charlie as a stunned Henry watches from the ground.

Charlie, now dressed as a private, delivers the hydrocortisone as promised. Henry becomes suspicious, recognizing him as the visiting general, but Charlie only says, "You know how it is, Colonel. We all look alike."
