= Dear Dad...Again =

- M*A*S*H episode
- Episode no.: Season 1 Episode 18
- Directed by: Jackie Cooper
- Written by: Larry Gelbart; Sheldon Keller
- Production code: J317
- Original air date: February 4, 1973

Guest appearances
- Gail Bowman; Alex Henteloff; Odessa Cleveland

Episode chronology
← Previous "Sometimes You Hear the Bullet"	Next → "The Longjohn Flap"
- M*A*S*H season 1

"Dear Dad...Again" is the 18th episode of the first season of the American television series M*A*S*H. It originally aired on February 4, 1973.

== Plot ==
Hawkeye writes to his father again about several crazy events that take place at the 4077th, including his bet with Trapper John that he could walk into the mess tent naked and nobody would notice (he loses), the arrival of Captain Adam Casey (portrayed by Alex Henteloff), a Demara-esque fraud masquerading as a doctor, Frank becoming drunk, and Margaret's attempt to sing "My Blue Heaven" at the camp "No-Talent Show".

Hawkeye's line, "I have always relied upon the kindness of strangers" (at minute 6:49), is a reference to Tennessee Williams' play A Streetcar Named Desire, with the line spoken by the character Blanche DuBois.

Hawkeye asks his father to "kiss sis, and Mom" in his letter to him. This is contradicted in later episodes which reveal Hawkeye as an only child with his mother deceased. He also mentions in "The Moose" that he always wanted a sister.
