= The Longjohn Flap =

- M*A*S*H episode
- Episode no.: Season 1 Episode 19
- Directed by: William Wiard
- Written by: Alan Alda
- Production code: J319
- Original air date: February 18, 1973

Episode chronology
← Previous "Dear Dad...Again"	Next → "The Army-Navy Game"
- M*A*S*H season 1

"The Longjohn Flap" is the 19th episode of the first season of the TV series M*A*S*H. It originally aired on February 18, 1973, and was the first episode of M*A*S*H to be written by series star Alan Alda.

== Plot ==
In the middle of a cold snap, Hawkeye receives a pair of longjohns from home. Hawkeye gives them to an ill Trapper out of sympathy and Trapper loses them to Radar in a poker game. The longjohns proceed to pass through the hands of almost everyone in the camp: Radar gives them to the mess cook (played by Joseph V. Perry) in exchange for a whole lamb roast with mint jelly, and the cook bribes Frank with them to avoid being demoted because of the unsanitary conditions of the kitchen. Frank gives the longjohns to an intimidating Margaret as a sign of devotion to her, before Klinger steals the longjohns from Margaret's tent. A remorseful Klinger then gives the longjohns to Father Mulcahy, who in turn gives them to Henry (but not until after he spends the night wearing them). Henry claims he will return the longjohns to their rightful owner but gets caught putting them on by Hawkeye and Trapper. Henry rebuffs Hawkeye's demand that the longjohns be returned but later gives them back to Hawkeye in gratitude for saving his life via an appendectomy.

== Themes ==
Like other M*A*S*H episodes, this episode deals with the absurdities of army bureaucracy: specifically, a supply error which results in warm-weather clothes being delivered to the camp in the midst of winter.

In this episode, as well as the earlier "Sometimes You Hear the Bullet", a more fully developed character for Henry emerges—he is not as buffoonish as in earlier episodes, as when he explains the intricacies of military bureaucracy to Radar.

In his autobiography, Never Have Your Dog Stuffed: and Other Things I've Learned, Alan Alda says that for this episode, he borrowed the structure from La Ronde. "In my version, the object that's passed from couple to couple is a pair of long johns during a cold spell in the Korean winter."
