= Ferdinand Waldo Demara =

American imposter

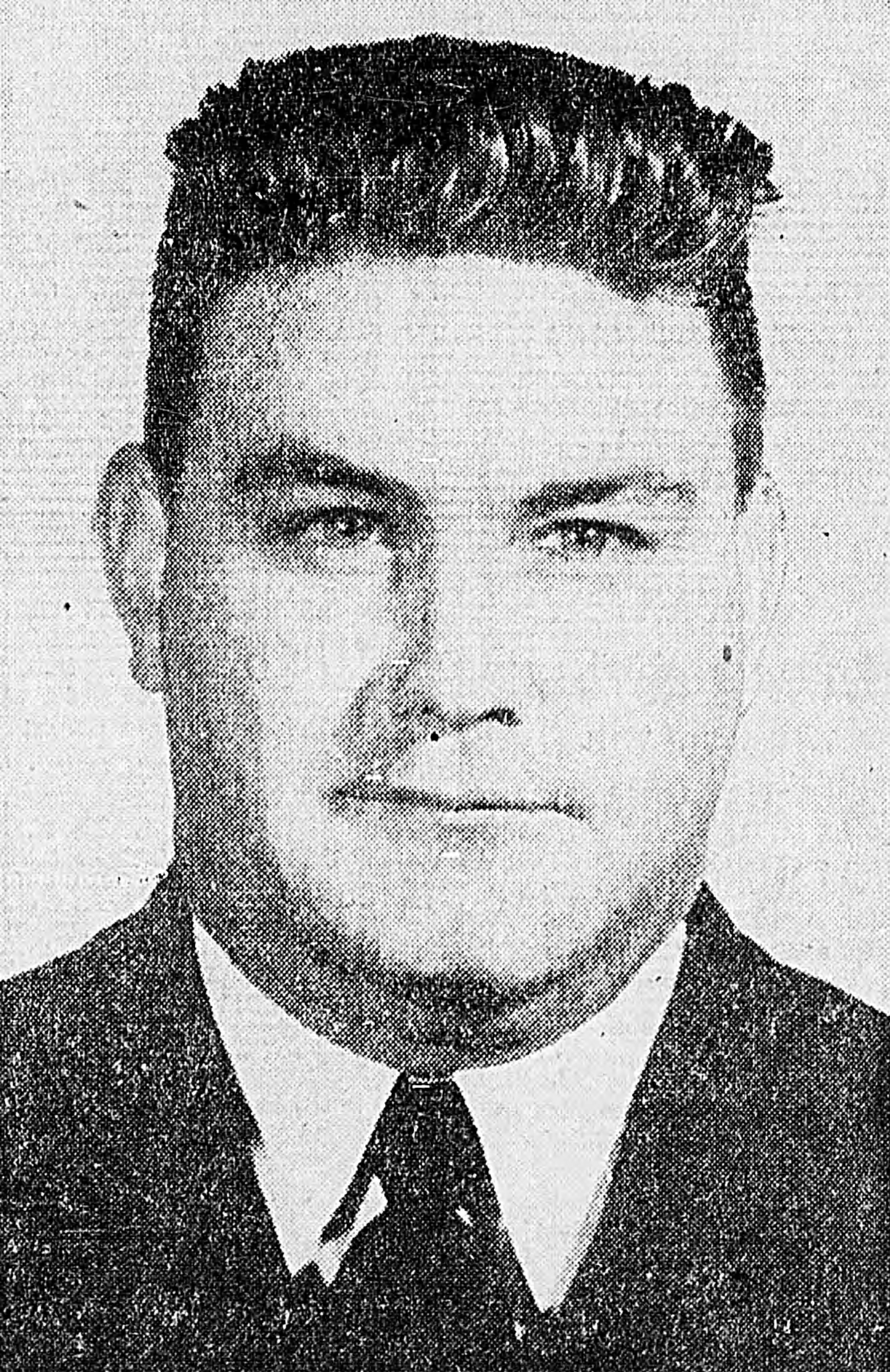
- Demara in 1951, posing as a naval surgeon
- Born: December 1921; Lawrence, Massachusetts, U.S.
- Died: June 7, 1982 (aged 60); Anaheim, California, U.S.
- Known for: Impersonating other people

Ferdinand Waldo Demara Jr. (December 1921 – June 7, 1982) was an American impostor. He was the subject of both a book and a movie, loosely based on his exploits: The Great Impostor, in which he was played by Tony Curtis.

Demara's impersonations included a civil engineer, a sheriff's deputy, an assistant prison warden, a doctor of applied psychology, a hospital orderly, a lawyer, a child-care expert, a Benedictine monk, a Trappist monk, a naval surgeon, an editor, a cancer researcher, and a teacher. One teaching job led to six months in prison.

Not many facts have been proven about Demara's life, in spite of the articles, book, and big screen movie made about him during his lifetime. He was said to possess a true photographic memory and was widely reputed to have an extraordinary IQ. He was apparently able to memorize necessary techniques from textbooks and worked on two cardinal rules: "the burden of proof is on the accuser" and "when in danger, attack." He described his own motivation as "Rascality, pure rascality".

== Early life and adulthood ==
Demara, known locally as "Fred", was born in Lawrence, Massachusetts, in 1921. His father, Ferdinand Waldo Demara Sr., was born in Rhode Island and worked in Lawrence's old Theatre District as a motion picture operator. Demara Sr. had been financially well-off, and the family lived in an upper-class neighborhood on Jackson St. in Lawrence. Demara Sr.'s brother, Napoleon, owned many of the theatres in Lawrence, in which Demara Sr. was an active union member. Early in the Great Depression, Fred's father became financially destitute, forcing the family to move from the Tower Hill neighborhood to the poorer section in the city, at 40 Texas Avenue in the lower southwest Tower Hill neighborhood.

During this financially troubled time, Demara Jr. ran away from home at age 16 to join the Trappist monks in Rhode Island. After two years, he was told he was not suited to being a Trappist and was sent instead to a Brothers of Charity home near Montreal, Canada. He was then transferred to a Brothers of Charity boys home in West Newbury, Massachusetts, where he taught fourth grade. After running away from the Brothers of Charity after an argument with his superior, he joined the United States Army in 1941.

== Impersonations ==
The following year, Demara began his new life by borrowing the name of Anthony Ignolia, an army buddy, and going AWOL. He joined the Abbey of Our Lady of Gethsemani, a Trappist monastery in Kentucky under his assumed identity. However, he met an acquaintance from his first Trappist monastery, and so he left before his true identity could be revealed. He then moved to the New Melleray Abbey near Dubuque, Iowa, before finally returning home. His father encouraged his son to turn himself in to the military police for his desertion, but he did not.

He then joined the United States Navy where he trained as a hospital corpsman. He did not reach the position he wanted, faked his suicide and borrowed another name, Robert Linton French, and pretended to be a religion-oriented psychologist. "Dr French" then presented himself at the New Subiaco Abbey, a Benedictine monastery in Arkansas, as a would-be Catholic convert. However, after a few weeks "he was summoned to the abbot's office, where he was accused of having forged his documents". He denied the accusations, but left the monastery. He travelled to Chicago, where he joined the Clerics of Saint Viator, before moving on to the Order of St. Camillus in Milwaukee. After once more arguing with his superiors, this time over his lack of cooking skills, he left and moved to New Jersey, where he joined the Paulist novitiate in Oak Ridge.

As Dr. French, he applied for various jobs at Catholic colleges and was eventually employed to teach psychology at Gannon College (now a university) in Erie, Pennsylvania. Being made dean of the School of Philosophy, he taught general psychology, industrial psychology, and abnormal psychology, and published a "well-received booklet" titled How to Bring Up Your Child. He left after "an unfortunate incident involving forged checks". He was briefly a member of the Benedictine Saint Bede's Abbey, Peru, Illinois, before joining the Brothers Hospitallers of Saint John of God.

Afterwards, Demara served as an orderly in a Los Angeles sanitarium, and served as an instructor in St. Martin's College (now a university) in the state of Washington. The FBI captured him and he served 18 months at the Naval Disciplinary Barracks, San Pedro, California, for desertion. After his release, he assumed a fake identity and studied law at night at Northeastern University, then joined the Brothers of Christian Instruction in Maine, a Roman Catholic order.

While there, he became acquainted with a young Canadian surgeon named Joseph C. Cyr. That led to his most famous exploit in which he masqueraded as Cyr, working as a ship's doctor aboard HMCS Cayuga, a Royal Canadian Navy destroyer, during the Korean War. Commander Peter Godwin Chance recalls that after guerrillas opened fire on the sailors, "our intrepid Doctor Joe Cyr, fully clad in the surgical garb, calmly moved among the soldiers tending to their wounds seemingly without a care in the world. In the aftermath of this pretty dirty vignette of what amounted to a civil war, it was clear to all of us in 'Cayuga' that our Joe deserved a medal for obvious bravery." The PR officer sent a recommendation for a commendation to the higher ups. However, several months later word came back that he was an imposter. The crew did not believe it at first and confronted Demara. After three days where he locked himself in his cabin, he surrendered and was brought back to Canada, where he was released without charges.

The MASH episode "Dear Dad...Again" included a one-time character, Captain Adam Casey, likely inspired by Demara's exploits, who performs several surgeries, but turns out not to be a real surgeon.

=== Guiding philosophy ===
Demara told his biographer he was successful in his roles because he was able to fit into positions that no one else had previously occupied. Demara explained it in the following excerpt from his biography:

'(Demara) had come to two beliefs. One was that in any organization there is always a lot of loose, unused power lying about which can be picked up without alienating anyone. The second rule is, if you want power and want to expand, never encroach on anyone else's domain; open up new ones...'

Demara referred to it as "expanding into the power vacuum," and described as such: "If you come into a new situation (there's a nice word for it), don't join some other professor's committee and try to make your mark by moving up in that committee. You'll, one, have a long haul and two, make an enemy." Demara's technique was to found his own committee. "That way there's no competition, no past standards to measure you by. How can anyone tell you aren't running a top outfit? And then there's no past laws or rules or precedents to hold you down or limit you. Make your own rules and interpretations. Nothing like it. Remember it, expand into the power vacuum!" In his later years, he joined the Los Angeles Adventurers Club; he was noted as the only person to lie his way into the club.

=== Founded a college ===
During Demara's impersonation as Brother John Payne of the Christian Brothers of Instruction (also known as Brothers of Christian Instruction), Demara decided to make the religious teaching order more prominent by founding a college in Alfred, Maine. Demara proceeded on his own and got the college chartered by the state. He then promptly left the religious order in 1951, when the Christian Brothers of Instruction offended him by not naming him as rector or chancellor of the new college and chose what Demara considered a terrible name for the college. The college Demara founded, LaMennais College in Alfred, Maine eventually became, in 1960, Walsh College (now Walsh University).

=== Minor fame ===
After this episode, he sold his tale to LIFE and worked in short-term jobs, since he had become widely known. However, he returned to his old tricks, obtained fake credentials, and got a job at a prison in Huntsville, Texas. According to his biographer, Demara's past became known and his position untenable when an inmate found a 1952 copy of LIFE with an article about the impostor. Time ran a full page article on Demara in February 1957.

On November 5, 1959, Demara appeared on the surrealistic game show hosted by Ernie Kovacs, Take a Good Look. The object was for one of the three celebrity panelists to guess his identity. One week later, on November 12, 1959, he appeared on an episode of the TV quiz show You Bet Your Life, with Groucho Marx. Demara recounted his exploits and said the $1,000 he earned on the program was going to be donated to the "Feed and Clothe Fred Demara Fund".

Demara continued to use new aliases but, as a result of his self-generated publicity, it became much harder to accomplish impersonations. In 1960, as a publicity stunt, Demara was given a small acting role in the horror film The Hypnotic Eye. He appears briefly in the film portraying a legitimate hospital surgeon. By this point, Demara's girth was so notable that he could not avoid attracting attention. Demara had already been considerably overweight during his impersonation of Joseph C. Cyr.

== Later life ==
Demara had various friendships with a wide variety of notable people during his life, including a close relationship with actor Steve McQueen, to whom Demara delivered last rites in November 1980. Tony Curtis, on the Tom Snyder television show, claimed that his favorite role was not The Boston Strangler, nor his role in the renowned comedy Some Like it Hot, but his role in the movie The Great Impostor, portraying Demara.

When Demara's past exploits and infamy were discovered in the late 1970s, he was almost dismissed from the Good Samaritan Hospital of Orange County in Anaheim, California, where he worked as a visiting chaplain. Chief of Staff Philip S. Cifarelli, who had developed a close personal friendship with Demara, personally vouched for him and Demara was allowed to remain as chaplain. Demara was a very active and appreciated minister, serving a variety of patients in the hospital. Few of those with whom he interacted at the hospital knew of his colorful past. Due to limited financial resources and his friendships with Cifarelli and Jerry Nilsson, one of the major owners of the hospital, Demara was allowed to live in the hospital until his death, even after illness forced him to stop working for them in 1980.

Demara died on June 7, 1982, at the age of 60 due to heart failure and complications from his diabetic condition, which had required both of his legs to be amputated. According to his obituary in The New York Times, he had been living in Orange County, California, for eight years. He died at West Anaheim Community Hospital.

== In media ==
Demara's story was recounted in the 1960 book, The Great Impostor, written by Robert Crichton and published by Random House. The book was a New York Times bestseller and adapted into a 1961 film by the same name starring Tony Curtis as Demara. A second book by Crichton, The Rascal and the Road, recounted Demara and Crichton's experiences together as Crichton conducted research for The Great Impostor.

=== Music ===
- The Band recorded a song, "Ferdinand the Imposter", released on a 2005 reissue of The Basement Tapes.
- The Fleetwoods recorded a song, "(He's) The Great Imposter", which was inspired by Demara's story.

=== Books ===
- Crichton, Robert (1959). The Great Impostor. Random House. ISBN 0-394-42714-9.
- Crichton, Robert (1961). The Rascal and the Road. Simon & Schuster. ISBN 1-199-39990-6. OCLC 1372850.

=== Films/TV ===
- The Great Impostor (1960) is a feature film of a fictionalized version of Demara's life, starring Tony Curtis as Demara.
- In "Dear Dad... Again", a 1973 episode of the TV series M*A*S*H, Hawkeye exposes a fraudulent surgeon; the plot was inspired by Demara.
- The protagonist of the TV series The Pretender, Jarod, is inspired by (but not based on) Demara.
- In the manga series One Piece, a character named Demaro Black impersonated the main character, referring to Demara's impersonations.
- The Iranian TV series Man of Many Faces features Massoud Shastchi, who must convince a judge that he was innocently mistaken for several other people rather than committing a series of impersonations.
