= The Moose (M*A*S*H) =

- M*A*S*H episode
- Episode no.: Season 1 Episode 5
- Directed by: Hy Averback
- Written by: Laurence Marks
- Production code: J305
- Original air date: October 15, 1972

Guest appearances
- Paul Jenkins; Virginia Ann Lee, TV credit (Virginia Baker); Timothy Brown; Craig Jue; Barbara Brownell; Patrick Adiarte

Episode chronology
← Previous "Chief Surgeon Who?"	Next → "Yankee Doodle Doctor"
- M*A*S*H season 1

"The Moose" is the fifth episode of the television series M*A*S*H. It was first broadcast on October 15, 1972, and repeated May 27, 1973. It was written by Laurence Marks and directed by Hy Averback.

Guest cast is Paul Jenkins as Sergeant Baker, Virginia Ann Lee as Young-Hi, Timothy Brown as Spearchucker Jones, Craig Jue as Benny, Barbara Brownell as Lt. Jones, Patrick Adiarte as Ho-Jon.

== Plot ==
Sergeant Baker stops by the 4077th with his "moose"; a teenage Korean girl named Young-Hi whom he bought. Obsessed with freeing the girl, Hawkeye wins her from Baker in a card game, but now Young-Hi thinks she belongs to Hawkeye.

Baker agrees to trade Young-Hi for the debt he runs up. However, he explains to Young-Hi that she now belongs to Hawkeye, rather than that she is free, as was Pierce's intent. Pierce first attempts to get rid of Young-Hi by sending her on a truck to Seoul, but she gets off when the truck stops for gas and hitchhikes back to the 4077th.

Eventually Pierce, Jones and McIntyre decide to "demoosify" Young-Hi and teach her how to be a person who deserves to be well-treated and not subservient. They send for the head of Young-Hi's family and discover that he is Young-Hi's little brother Benny and that he immediately plans to sell her again. Initially, Young-Hi agrees with Benny out of loyalty to her family but then returns, having told Benny to "shove off".

In the end, Young-Hi is enrolled in convent school in Seoul. In the last scene of the episode, Pierce, McIntyre and Spearchucker Jones receive a letter from her.

The term "moose" derives from the Japanese word for daughter, "musume", and refers to female servants of servicemen, who may be treated almost as slaves.
