= The Sniper (M*A*S*H) =

- M*A*S*H episode
- Episode no.: Season 2 Episode 10
- Directed by: Jackie Cooper
- Written by: Richard M. Powell
- Production code: K410
- Original air date: November 17, 1973

Episode chronology
| ← Previous "Dear Dad... Three" | Next → "Carry On, Hawkeye" |
- M*A*S*H season 2

"The Sniper" is the 34th episode of the M*A*S*H television series, and tenth of season two. The episode aired on November 17, 1973.

== Plot ==
Hawkeye's picnic date with new nurse Lieutenant Marquette (Teri Garr) is interrupted by gunshots from a sniper. The couple quickly heads back to the camp, where everyone but Radar and Colonel Blake, who are pinned down in the showers, shelters in the main hospital building. Eventually Radar and the Colonel join the staff in the hospital building and they manage to treat casualties which soon arrive.

Help from headquarters is not immediately forthcoming, and Frank's attempts to be "a real man" (encouraged by Margaret) leads him and Hawkeye to ambush a figure in the mess tent, who turns out to be Radar, desperate for food. It's not until the following day that outside help arrives, in the form of a US army helicopter firing shots at the sniper with the soldier riding shotgun firing on the sniper with a submachine gun, wounding him. Hawkeye operates on the sniper, and reports to the Swampmen that the sniper was a scared kid who got separated from his unit and targeted the camp in the belief that he was firing on MacArthur's headquarters.

== In popular culture ==
This episode also contains the only instance of onscreen nudity in the television series and one of the first depictions of nudity in prime time TV in the United States-—a brief glimpse of Gary Burghoff's buttocks as Radar's towel slips off as he runs into the shower tent to escape from the sniper fire.
