= Pilot (M*A*S*H) =

- M*A*S*H episode
- Alan Alda and Wayne Rogers
- Episode no.: Season 1 Episode 1
- Directed by: Gene Reynolds
- Written by: Larry Gelbart
- Production code: Z-9522
- Original air date: September 17, 1972

Guest appearances
- G. Wood as Brigadier General Hammond; Patrick Adiarte as Ho-Jon; Karen Philipp as Lt. Dish; George Morgan as Father Mulcahy; Timothy Brown as Spearchucker; Odessa Cleveland as Ginger; John Orchard as Ugly John; Linda Meiklejohn as Leslie Scorch; Laura Miller as Knocko; Bruno Kirby as Pvt. Boone

Episode chronology
← Previous —	Next → "To Market, to Market"
- M*A*S*H season 1

The pilot episode of M*A*S*H, the first episode of the first season was broadcast on September 17, 1972, although the initial script was first written in November 1971. The episode was written by Larry Gelbart and directed by Gene Reynolds, who received the Directors Guild of America Award for it. It was also nominated for two Emmys for its direction and writing.

In the episode, Ho-Jon, the houseboy of Captains Hawkeye Pierce and Trapper John McIntyre, has been accepted to Hawkeye's college, but they must raise tuition for him if he is to attend. They hold a fund-raising party while their commanding officer, Lt. Col Henry Blake, is away. There, they raffle off a weekend's R & R in Tokyo along with the company of a nurse, much to the chagrin of Majors Frank Burns and Margaret Houlihan.

== Plot ==
Returning to the Swamp after a long session in the OR, Hawkeye receives a letter announcing that Ho-Jon has been accepted into his alma mater, though he and Trapper still have the task of coming up with $2,000 for travel and tuition. Hawkeye convinces Trapper that they can accomplish it by raffling off a weekend pass to Tokyo with the company of a gorgeous nurse. They go to Colonel Henry Blake's office to propose the idea to him, and he nervously gives them permission. Hawkeye convinces a nurse, Lt. "Dish", to agree to be the nurse who will accompany the winner to Tokyo, but he promises that she'll be able to get out of spending any time with the winner.

Later on, Hawkeye and Trapper get into an argument with Frank Burns, who, in a fit of rage, destroys their still. Furious with him, they put a bag over his head and throw him out of the tent. When Henry hears about it, he withdraws the passes and cancels the party they had planned to throw for fear that Frank will complain to General Hammond. He adds that he has to see Hammond in Seoul and was unhappy about the party taking place in his absence. However, as Henry is leaving, Radar reveals that he tricked Henry into signing two passes, so the party can take place. Unfortunately, Hawkeye's and Trapper's happiness is short lived as they discover Frank (as acting commanding officer) has cancelled the party. To get rid of him so they can have their party, Hawkeye injects him with a sedative, wraps a bandage around his face, and puts him in a bed in post-op, prescribing a dose of sedative every hour.

An upset Margaret comes to the party in search of Frank, whom she has been unable to find. Suspicious of the activities of Hawkeye and Trapper, she calls General Hammond, a former lover, who is so excited to hear from her that he departs for the 4077 at once. Meanwhile, Hawkeye announces that they have raised $1800 and then has the nurse draw a name for the raffle. Hawkeye has fixed the raffle so that the winner is Father Mulcahy, but unfortunately, he announces this just as Hammond walks in.

While the infuriated general questions Hawkeye and Trapper, Margaret walks in with Frank, still sedated and with bandages around his head, and screams at the two of them. Hammond demands that they be arrested, but just in the nick of time, choppers arrive loaded with casualties from a Canadian unit. After the session, which Hammond participates in, he tells Henry that Hawkeye and Trapper are two of the best surgeons he has ever seen and, for that reason, he is dropping the charges.
