= Edwina (M*A*S*H) =

- M*A*S*H episode
- Episode no.: Season 1 Episode 13
- Directed by: James Sheldon
- Written by: Hal Dresner
- Production code: J312
- Original air date: December 24, 1972

Guest appearances
- Arlene Golonka; Linda Meiklejohn; Marcia Strassman

Episode chronology
← Previous "Dear Dad"	Next → "Love Story"
- M*A*S*H season 1

"Edwina" is the 13th episode of the first season of the TV series M*A*S*H. It originally aired on December 24, 1972. It was written by Hal Dresner, directed by James Sheldon and guest starred Arlene Golonka in the title role.

== Plot ==
Edwina "Eddie" Ferguson, an attractive but clumsy nurse, who often accidentally injures potential suitors, cannot find romance at the 4077th—or anywhere else, for that matter, as she confides to Margie Cutler. The other nurses at the Double Natural discuss her problem and agree to put their romantic relationships with the doctors and corpsmen on hold until someone agrees to date Eddie.

Eventually, to end the romantic drought the doctors draw straws to be her date for an evening, and Hawkeye draws the short straw. Hilarity ensues as his best smooth operator technique collides head on with Eddie's innate klutziness.

== Guest cast ==
- Arlene Golonka – Edwina Ferguson
- Marcia Strassman – Margie Cutler
