= Jack Soo =

American actor (1917–1979)

- 鈴木悟郎
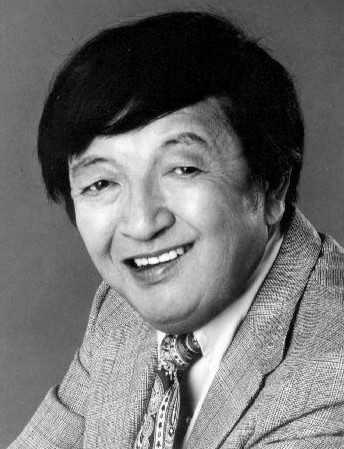
- Soo in 1975
- Born: Goro Suzuki; October 28, 1917; Born at sea, Pacific Ocean
- Died: January 11, 1979 (aged 61); Los Angeles, California, U.S.
- Resting place: Forest Lawn Memorial Park
- Education: University of California, Berkeley
- Occupations: Actor, singer
- Years active: 1958–1979
- Spouse: Jan Zdelar (m. 1945)
- Military career
- Allegiance: United States
- Branch: United States Army
- Rank: Private
- Unit: 442nd Regimental Combat Team
- Conflicts: World War II

Japanese name
- Kanji: 鈴木悟郎
- Katakana: スズキゴロウ
Transcriptions
- Romanization: Suzuki Gorō

Jack Soo (born Goro Suzuki, October 28, 1917 – January 11, 1979) was an American actor and singer. He was best known for his role as Detective Nick Yemana on the television sitcom Barney Miller.

== Early life, family and education ==
Jack Soo was born Goro Suzuki on a ship traveling in the Pacific Ocean from the United States to Japan on October 28, 1917. His parents lived in Oakland, California, and they decided that as he was their first son, they wanted to have him born in Japan.

He graduated from University of California, Berkeley with a degree in English. He lived in Oakland until ordered into internment along with other Japanese Americans during World War II and in the wake of the passage of Executive Order 9066. He was sent to the Topaz War Relocation Center in Utah. His fellow internees recalled him as a "camp favorite," an entertainer singing at dances and numerous events.

== Career ==
Soo's career as an entertainer began in earnest at the end of the war, first as a stand-up nightclub performer primarily in the Midwestern United States. To avoid anti–Japanese-American prejudice, he adopted the name Jack Soo while working in nightclubs such as Chin's, a Chinese nightclub in Cleveland, Ohio. He also took on the surname Soo that he had used to leave the internment camp at Topaz.

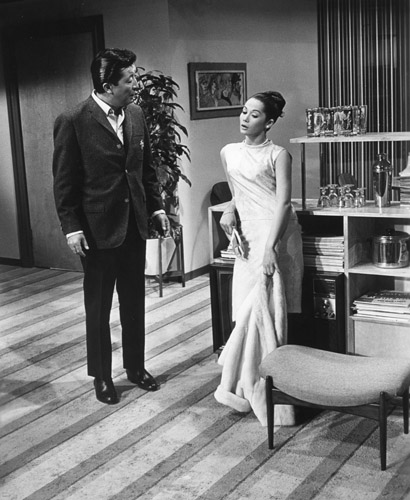
Jack Soo and Nancy Kwan in Flower Drum Song

His big break occurred in 1958 when he was cast in the Broadway musical hit Flower Drum Song in the role of the nightclub owner Sammy Fong. Soo had been working in San Francisco at the Forbidden City, a Chinese nightclub and cabaret, where he was discovered by the actor and dancer Gene Kelly who was directing Flower Drum Song. Soo switched to the Sammy Fong role (Chinatown's "Nathan Detroit") during the run and reprised the role when the film version (1961) of the musical was made.

Soo’s first nationwide TV appearance was on The Jack Benny Program on November 27, 1962, as the tough-talking, street-wise talent agent in "Jack Meets Japanese Agent". In 1964, Soo played a weekly supporting role as Rocky Sin, a poker-playing con artist in Valentine's Day, a comedy television series starring Anthony Franciosa that lasted for one season. During the next decade, he appeared in films such as The Green Berets as a colonel of the Army of the Republic of Vietnam and the 1967 musical Thoroughly Modern Millie, as well as making guest appearances on TV shows such as Hawaii Five-O, The Odd Couple, and on two episodes of M*A*S*H.

Soo joined Motown Records in 1965 as one of their first non-African-American musicians. During his time there, he recorded a slow ballad version of "For Once in My Life" as the first male singer to do so. The record was never released and was shelved in the Motown archives. The song was soon after made famous by Stevie Wonder.

Soo was cast in his most memorable role in 1975 on the ABC sitcom Barney Miller. He had met and befriended the show's producer Danny Arnold years earlier while working the nightclub circuit. Arnold was also a performer at the time. In the series, Soo played the laid-back, but very wry, Detective Nick Yemana, who was responsible for making the dreadful coffee that, in one of the series' running jokes, his fellow detectives had to drink every day. Occasionally, his character played against stereotypes of Asian Americans by emphasizing Yemana's solidly American background.

Soo refused to perform in roles that demeaned Asian Americans. He often spoke out against negative ethnic portrayals and was adamant about being recognized as an American.

== Personal life ==
Soo was married to Jan Zdelar, a model, in 1945. The couple had three children: Jayne, Richard, and James.

=== Death ===
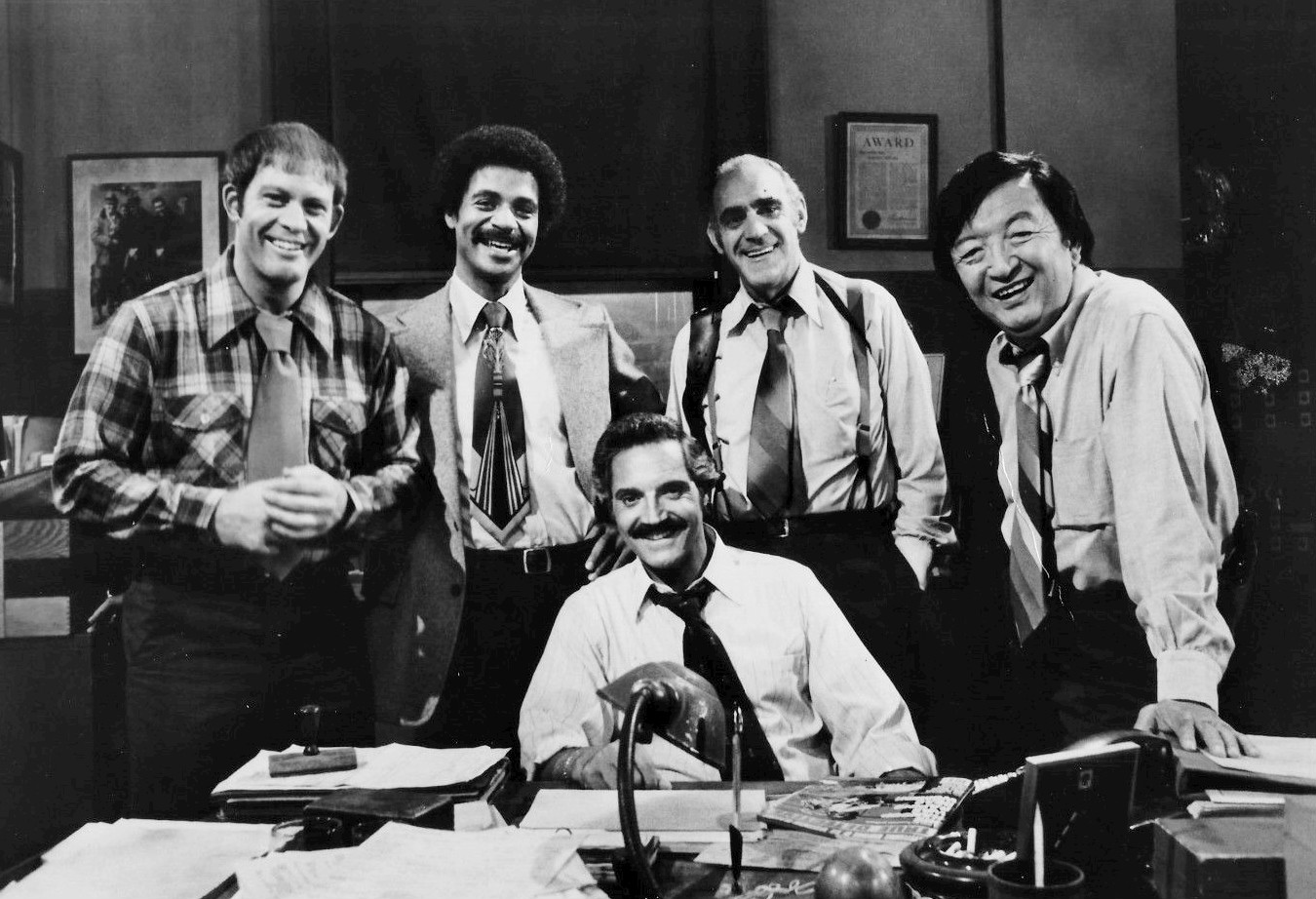
Jack Soo (far right) with the Barney Miller cast

Soo, a smoker, was diagnosed with esophageal cancer during Barney Miller's fourth season (1977–1978), missing the last five episodes. He returned for the opening of season five, but the cancer spread quickly, and Soo died on January 11, 1979, at age 61, at the University of California Los Angeles Medical Center (now the Ronald Reagan UCLA Medical Center). His last appearance on the show was in the episode entitled "The Vandal", which aired on November 9, 1978, delivering the episode's final line, "...I have nothing to add."

Soo's last televised appearance was on an episode of the daytime version of Hollywood Squares, which aired December 4, 1978.

A running joke on Barney Miller was that Soo's character, Yemana, made bad coffee. "It must have been my coffee," Soo joked when he was being wheeled into surgery. A retrospective episode showing clips of Soo aired on the last episode of season 5. The episode included castmates as themselves, giving personal memories of Soo, the actor. It concluded with all raising their coffee cups in a final farewell toast to him.

He is buried at Forest Lawn Memorial Park in Hollywood Hills.

== Filmography ==
Film
Year	Title	Role	Notes
1961	Flower Drum Song	Samuel Adams 'Sammy' Fong	
1963	Who's Been Sleeping in My Bed?	Yoshimi Hiroti	
1966	The Oscar	Sam	
1967	Thoroughly Modern Millie	Ching Ho / Oriental No. 1	
1968	The Green Berets	Col. Cai	
1978	Return from Witch Mountain	Mr. "Yo-Yo" Yokomoto	
2009	You Don't Know Jack: The Jack Soo Story	Self	
Television
Year	Title	Role	Notes
1962	The Jack Benny Program	Himself	Episode: Jack Meets a Japanese Agent
1964	Valentine's Day	Rockwell 'Rocky' Sin	Main cast (34 episodes)
1965	The Wackiest Ship in the Army	Shiru	Episode: Shakedown
1966	Summer Fun	Sidney	Episode: Pirates of Flounder Bay
1968–1971	Julia	Tree Man; Judge Warren wazaku	Episode: I'm Dreaming of a Black Christmas; Episode: Courting Time
1969	The Monk	Hip Guy	ABC Movie of the Week
1970	Hawaii Five-O	Sam Quong	Episode: The One with the Gun
1971	The Name of the Game	Sergeant George Kwan	Episode: The Man Who Killed a Ghost
1971	The Jimmy Stewart Show	Woodrow Yamada	Episode: Pro Bono Publico; Episode: Cockadoodle Don't
1972	The Odd Couple	Chuk Mai Chin	Episode: Oscar's Promotion
1972–1975	M*A*S*H	Charlie Lee; Quoc	Episode: To Market, to Market; Episode: Payday
1973	She Lives!	Dr. Osikawa	ABC Movie of the Week
1974	Ironside	Joe Lee; Joe Lee; Sing-Ho	Episode: Amy Prentiss (1); Episode: Amy Prentiss (2); Episode: The Over-the-Hill Blues
1974–1975	Police Story	Tai'ske; Bruce Chan; Bruce Chan	Episode: The Hunters; Episode: Year of the Dragon (1); Episode: Year of the Dragon (2)
1975	Police Woman	Red Star	Episode: The Bloody Nose
1975–1979	Barney Miller	Detective Sergeant Nick Yemana	Main cast (101 episodes), (final appearance)
1977	Busting Loose	Hoofat	Episode: House of Noodles
