= The Army-Navy Game (M*A*S*H) =

- M*A*S*H episode
- Episode no.: Season 1 Episode 20
- Directed by: Gene Reynolds
- Story by: McLean Stevenson
- Teleplay by: Sid Dorfman
- Production code: J322
- Original air date: February 25, 1973

Guest appearance
- John Orchard - Ugly John

Episode chronology
| ← Previous "The Longjohn Flap" | Next → "Sticky Wicket" |
- M*A*S*H season 1

"The Army–Navy Game" is the 20th episode of the first season of the TV series M*A*S*H, originally airing on February 25, 1973; its repeat on September 9, 1973, was the last official telecast in M*A*S*H's first season on CBS. The episode was co-written by cast member McLean Stevenson ("Lt. Col. Henry Blake").

== Plot ==
Excitement runs high in the camp on the day of the Army-Navy football game, with several members of the 4077th putting money into a betting pool. As the game starts, the unit comes under enemy attack, causing some damage and injuries. When a bomb falls into the compound but does not detonate, the entire camp is thrown into a panic. Lt. Col. Blake starts calling various branches of the military, trying to find out who dropped the bomb, but the people he talks to are more interested in following the game. He eventually learns that the bomb was dropped by the CIA, then sends Hawkeye and Trapper out to defuse it. However, the poorly written defusing instructions cause them to accidentally start the timer on the bomb – which explodes and fires hundreds of propaganda leaflets into the air. As life in the camp settles down, Father Mulcahy wins the football pool, having placed the only bet on Navy.

== Notes ==
- In this episode the theme song is a different recording than prior episodes, with a much more carefree arrangement that emphasizes woodwind instruments, brass and percussion.
- The game depicted in this episode is fictional. No actual game has finished with a point total as high as the fictional game's score of Navy 42, Army 36.
- Though not acknowledged in the credits, game show host Tom Kennedy is the voice of the football commentator heard throughout this episode. Kennedy verified this in a 2003 interview.
- The radio announcer (Game show host Tom Kennedy) says it is the 53rd Army–Navy game. The 53rd game was played in 1952, with Navy winning 7–0.
- The propaganda leaflets are actually "Ace Eli" flyers (props from the 1973 film Ace Eli and Rodger of the Skies - like M*A*S*H, a 20th Century Fox production), identifiable in the high-definition version of the episode.
