= James Callahan (actor) =

American actor (1930–2007)

James T. Callahan
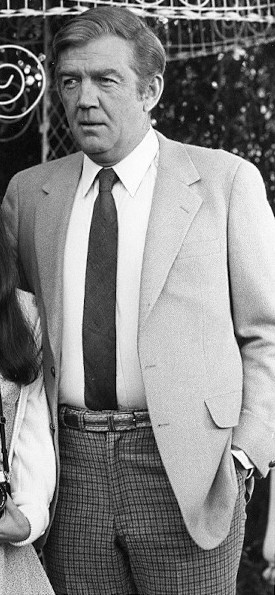
- Callahan in 1981
- Born: James Thomas Callahan; October 4, 1930; Grand Rapids, Michigan, US
- Died: August 3, 2007 (aged 76); Fallbrook, California, US
- Spouse: Peggy Cannon (m. 1994)

James Thomas Callahan (October 4, 1930 – August 3, 2007) was an American film and television actor who appeared in more than 120 films and television programs between 1959 and 2007. He is perhaps best known for his portrayal from 1987 to 1990 of Walter Powell on the syndicated sitcom Charles in Charge, starring Scott Baio.

== Early years ==
One of three children, Callahan was born in Grand Rapids, Michigan, to William and Elenora Callahan on October 4, 1930. After his service in the United States Army from 1951 to 1953, he worked for the United States Postal Service. While attending school in the Midwest, he discovered acting and on the advice of a teacher, he enrolled at the University of Washington in Seattle He studied drama and graduated in the late 1950s.

== Career ==
Callahan played a doomed soldier/journalist in the M*A*S*H episode "Sometimes You Hear the Bullet". He also had recurring roles in three 1960s series, as Danny Adams in ABC's Wendy and Me, with a cast including George Burns, Connie Stevens, Ron Harper, and J. Pat O'Malley, as Lieutenant O'Connell on NBC's 13-episode war drama, Convoy, with John Gavin and John Larch, and as the governor's press secretary in The Governor and J.J., which starred Dan Dailey and Julie Sommars. He appeared in "The Twilight Zone" S5 E12 "Ninety Years Without Slumbering" which aired 12/18/1963. Callahan portrayed a small role in Barnaby Jones in an episode titled "Counterfall" (02/04/1975).

== Personal life ==
Callahan did not marry until he was sixty-three, when he wed Peggy Cannon in 1994. They were married until his death in 2007.

== Death ==
In February 2007, Callahan was diagnosed with esophageal cancer. Six months later, on August 3, 2007, Callahan died at his home in Fallbrook, California at age 76.

== Filmography ==
Year	Title	Role	Notes
1959	The Californians	James McFadden	Episode: "The Fur Story"
1959	Steve Canyon	Lt. Hageman	Episode: "Operation Firebee"
1959	Battle of the Coral Sea	Australian Prisoner	Uncredited
1959	Man on a String	C.B.I. Agent	Uncredited
1960	Bourbon Street Beat	Detective	Episode: "Twice Betrayed"
1960	Dennis the Menace	Officer Holt	Episode: "Dennis Runs Away"
1960	Manhunt	Willie	Episode: "A Rose for Willie"
1960	Two Faces West	Cleve	Episode: "Prognosis: Death"
1960	The Walking Target	Al Kramer	
1961	National Velvet	Johnny	Episode: "The Bridegroom"
1961	The Detectives Starring Robert Taylor	Phil	Episode: "Hit and Miss"
1961	The Jim Backus Show	Lou	2 episodes
1962	Perry Mason	Bookkeeper Fred Carlyle	Episode: "The Case of the Shapely Shadow"
1962	Route 66	Smudge	Episode: "City of Wheels"
1962	Have Gun - Will Travel	Albert Eubanks	Episode: "Don't Shoot the Piano Player"
1962	All Fall Down	Gas Station Attendant	Uncredited
1962	Experiment in Terror	FBI Agent	Uncredited
1962	G.E. True	Detective Floyd Wright	Episode: "Hercule Poirot"
1962	Saints and Sinners	Edgar	Episode: "Judgement in Jazz Alley"
1962	The Untouchables	Miles Henning	Episode: "The Economist"
1962	Stoney Burke	Bert	Episode: "Spin a Golden Web"
1962–1964	Dr. Kildare	Dr. Yates Atkinson	6 episodes
1963	Combat!	Reischer	Episode: "The Squad"
1963	Empire	Redford	Episode: "A House in Order"
1963	Grindl	Mike	Episode: "Grindl and the Counterfeiters"
1963	The Eleventh Hour	Matt Hopewell	Episode: "I Feel Like a Rutabaga"
1963	The Twilight Zone	Doug Kirk	Episode: "Ninety Years Without Slumbering"
1963	The Lieutenant	Markley	Episode: "Fall from a White Horse"
1964	My Favorite Martian	Jack	Episode: "Unidentified Flying Uncle Martin"
1964–1965	Wendy and Me	Danny Adams	34 episodes
1965	Convoy	Lt. Dick O'Connell	TV series
1965	Profiles in Courage	Barnes	Episode: "General Alexander William Doniphan", with Peter Lawford as Doniphan
1966	The Fugitive	Joe Donovan / Russ Haynes	2 episodes
1966	The Time Tunnel	Navy Ensign Beard	Episode: "One Way To The Moon"
1967	Mosby's Marauders	Sam Chapman	
1967	The Invaders	Dr. Harry Mills / Ed Gidney	2 episodes
1967	Walt Disney's Wonderful World of Color	Sam Chapman	Episodes: "Willie and the Yank: The Mosby Raiders" and "Willie and the Yank: The Deserter"
1968	A Man Called Gannon	Bo	
1969	Adam-12	Miles Wellman	Episode: "Log 92: Tell Him He Pushed a Little Too Hard"
1969–1970	The Governor & J.J.	George Callison	3 episodes
1970	Tropic of Cancer	Fillmore	
1971	Cade's County	Llewellyn Burton	Episode: "Safe Deposit"
1972	Lady Sings the Blues	Reg Hanley	
1972	Love, American Style	Jim	Episodes: "Love and the Confession"
1973	Love, American Style	Malcolm	Episodes: "Love and the Hand Maiden"
1973	Marcus Welby, M.D.	Allen Lawrence	Episode: "A More Exciting Case"
1973	M*A*S*H	Cpl. Tommy Gillis	Episode: "Sometimes You Hear the Bullet"
1973	The Wonderful World of Disney	Sheriff Wyndham	Episode: "The Mystery in Dracula's Castle"
1974	The Missiles of October	Dave Powers	TV movie
1975	Cannon	Police Lieutenant	Episode: "The Victim"
1976	The Practice	Jim	Episode: "Molly and Jim"
1976	Holmes & Yoyo	Weston	Episode "Dental Dynamiter"
1977	Outlaw Blues	Garland Dupree	
1977	The Rockford Files	Leslie Hartman	Episode: "New Life, Old Dragons"
1977	The Hardy Boys/Nancy Drew Mysteries	Haggarty	2 episodes
1978	Black Sheep Squadron	Col. Maurice Parker	Episode: "Sheep in the Limelight"
1978–1979	The Runaways	Sgt. Hal Grady	13 episodes
1980	The Ropers	Tom Cummins	Episode: "Old Flames"
1980	Cloud Dancer	Walt Lawson	
1980–1982	Benson	Dr. Phillips	2 episodes
1980–1982	Quincy, M.E.	Adrian Mercer / Larry Bridges	2 episodes
1981	Bosom Buddies	Dr. Leonard Bob	Episode: "What Price Glory?"
1981	Inchon	General Almond	
1981	CBS Children's Mystery Theatre	Walter Ames	Episode: The Haunting of Harrington House
1981–1982	Alice	Vinnie	2 episodes
1982	Knight Rider	Cheriff Bruckner	Episode: "Good Day at White Rock"
1983	Little House on the Prairie: A Look Back to Yesterday	Doctor Houser	TV movie
1983	Remington Steele	Emmett DeVore	Episode: "Steele's Gold"
1983	Too Close for Comfort	Marvin Rowe	Episode: "Out to Lunch"
1984	The A-Team	Captain Fallone	Episode: "The Island"
1984	The Burning Bed	Berlin Hughes	TV movie
1985	Knight Rider	Jeff Barnes	Episode: "Circus Knights"
1985	A Bunny's Tale	Phil	TV movie
1985	Copacabana (musical)	Dennis Riley	TV Musical
1986	Highway to Heaven	Jack Brent	Episode: "Children's Children"
1986	Growing Pains	Uncle Bob	Episode: "Extra Lap"
1987–1990	Charles in Charge	Walter Powell	Seasons 2 through 5
1992	The Golden Girls	Malcolm Gordon	Episode: "Goodbye, Mr. Gordon"
1992	Hero	Police Chief	
1993	Return of the Living Dead 3	Colonel Peck	
1994	Mei zhen	Mr. Platt	
1995	Return to Two Moon Junction	Mr. Bowman	
1995	Midnight Man	Chief Massey	
1995	A Norman Rockwell Christmas Story	Samuel Cavanaugh	TV movie
1996	Caroline in the City	Mayor Paisley	Episode: "Caroline and the Twenty-Eight-Pound Walleye"
1996	Promised Land	Warren Dempsey	Episode: "Christmas"
1997	ER	Oliver	Episode: "Something New"
1999	Every Dog Has Its Day	Father Quinn	
1999	The Practice	Trevor Wayne	Episode: "Oz"
2000	ER	Mr. Bristol	Episode: "Homecoming"
2001	Extreme Honor	Randolph Brascoe	
2005	Medium	Jury Foreman	Episode: "Judge, Jury and Executioner"
2006	Wild Hearts	Arliss – Mayor of Hope	Hallmark TV movie
2006	7th Heaven	Father Mulligan	Episode: "And More Secrets"
2006	The Standard	Principal Watson	
2007	Born	Albert Martino	(final film role)
