= Sometimes You Hear the Bullet =

- M*A*S*H episode
- Episode no.: Season 1 Episode 17
- Directed by: William Wiard
- Written by: Carl Kleinschmitt
- Production code: J318
- Original air date: January 28, 1973

Guest appearances
- Ron Howard; James T. Callahan

Episode chronology
← Previous "The Ringbanger"	Next → "Dear Dad...Again"
- M*A*S*H season 1

"Sometimes You Hear the Bullet" is the 17th episode of the first season of the TV series M*A*S*H, originally airing on January 28, 1973. This is the first episode in which the medical staff failed to save a wounded soldier, and one of the first episodes of the series showing a member of the hospital staff truly affected by death.

Writer Carl Kleinschmitt was nominated for a Writers Guild Award for this episode.

== Plot ==
Frank Burns throws his back out while dancing with Hot Lips in her tent. While recuperating in post-op, he puts himself in for the Purple Heart. Margaret justifies it by claiming that since the injury was sustained at a front-line unit (due to a "slip in the mud on the way to the shower"), technically that makes it battle-connected.

Hawkeye's old friend Tommy Gillis (James T. Callahan) appears at the 4077th. A reporter in civilian life, he is a combat soldier working on a book about life on the front lines called You Never Hear the Bullet. The book relates that, unlike in the movies, a soldier who is killed does not hear the bullet. Tommy leaves for his unit just as wounded arrive at the compound. While operating on a Marine with appendicitis (played by Ron Howard), the doctors remark on how young he looks. Later, recovering in the hospital ward, the Marine asks Hawkeye how soon he can get back to the front so he can continue killing enemy soldiers. Hawkeye discovers that the Marine is only 15 years old, having used his older brother's ID to enlist to win back his ex-girlfriend. Hawkeye tells the Marine that a woman who cares about such things is probably not worth having.

Later in the episode, Tommy is brought in, having been shot by the enemy on the front lines. Just before being anesthetized, he tells Hawkeye that he had heard the bullet just before being hit, just like in the movies. Hawkeye suggests that Sometimes You Hear the Bullet is a better title anyway, and tries desperately to save Tommy's life. Unfortunately, Tommy dies on the table and Henry Blake orders Hawkeye to move away and help Trapper.

Henry sees Hawkeye outside crying for Tommy, and wondering why he never cried for any of the other men he has seen die while in Korea. Henry consoles Hawkeye by saying "There are certain rules about a war. Rule Number One is: Young men die. And Rule Number Two is: Doctors can't change Rule Number One." Not wanting to see another young man die, Hawkeye reports the underage Marine to Major Houlihan, sending him back home. The Marine tells Hawkeye he will hate him as long as he lives and Hawkeye says he hopes it's a long healthy hate.

The Marine later forgives Hawkeye when Hawkeye presents him with Frank's Purple Heart.

== Themes ==
This episode contains the strongest antiwar message in the first season of M*A*S*H. Although network bosses discouraged the show's writers and producers from creating episodes with controversial content, this episode, combining drama and comedy, was well received. Alan Alda cited "Sometimes You Hear the Bullet" as an example of the sort of television he wanted to do, mixing dark and light, and Larry Linville called it the finest example of what the show could accomplish. The script for this episode was nominated for a Writers Guild Award.

In this episode Ron Howard plays an underage 15-year-old Marine. He was 18 years old at the time of filming. At the time, Howard was best known for playing Opie Taylor in the sitcom The Andy Griffith Show. In an episode of its spin-off Gomer Pyle – USMC, the underage Opie runs away from home and attempts to join the Marines.
