= Sorrell Booke =

American actor (1930–1994)

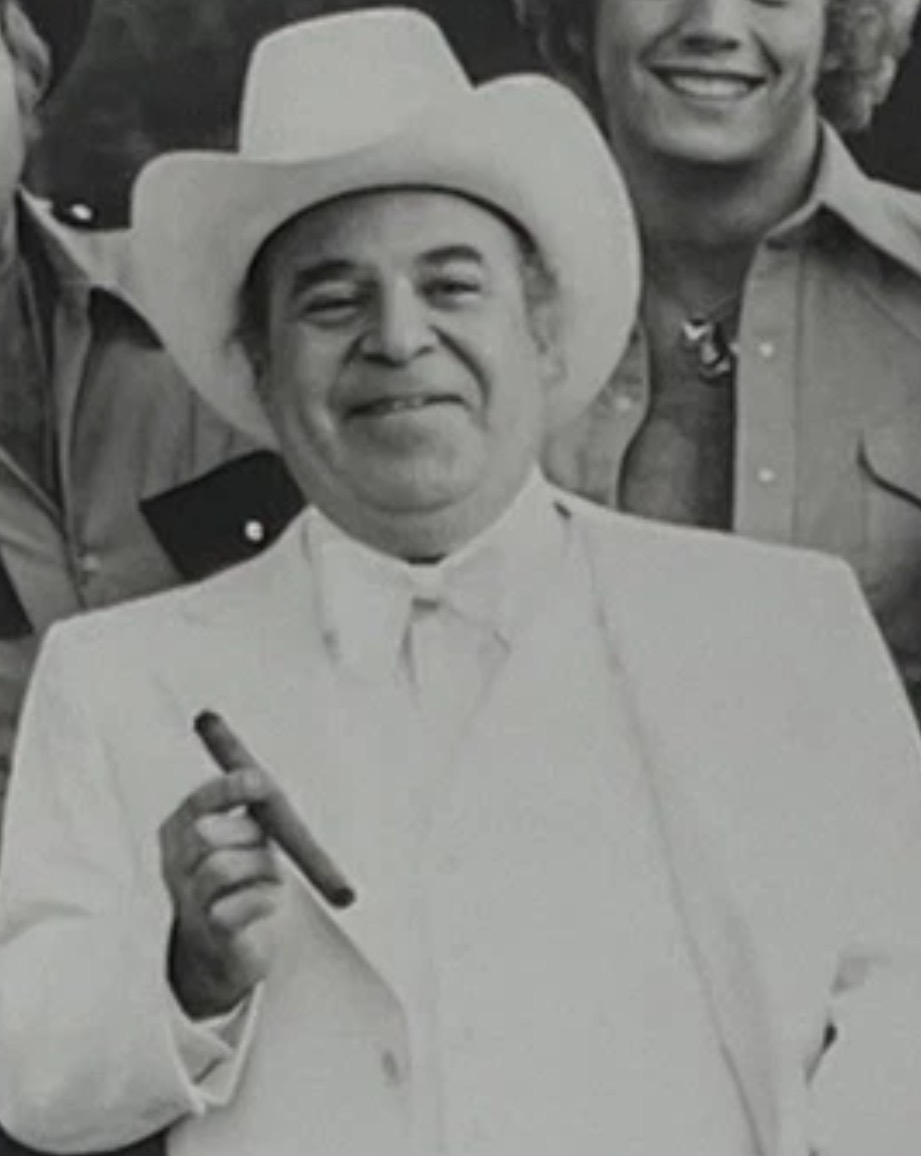
- Booke as Boss Hogg in The Dukes of Hazzard (1979)
- Born: January 4, 1930; Buffalo, New York, U.S.
- Died: February 11, 1994 (aged 64); Sherman Oaks, California, U.S.
- Resting place: Hillside Memorial Park Cemetery
- Education: Columbia University (BA); Yale University (MFA)
- Occupation: Actor
- Years active: 1939–1993
- Known for: Jefferson Davis "Boss" Hogg in The Dukes of Hazzard
- Spouse: Miranda Knickerbocker (m. 1958; div. 1973)
- Children: 2
- Relatives: Hubert Renfro Knickerbocker (father-in-law)

Sorrell Booke (January 4, 1930 – February 11, 1994) was an American actor. He appeared in over 130 film, television, and stage productions, and was best known for his role as "Boss" Hogg, the principal antagonist of the television series The Dukes of Hazzard (1979–1985).

== Early life and education ==
Booke was born in Buffalo, New York, the son of Sol Booke, a Jewish physician. As a child, he entertained patients in his father's waiting room, and began acting on radio at nine. As a young radio actor he was known for his impersonations. He won a radio contest for mimicking the voice of Adolf Hitler, and appeared regularly as an actor on local radio stations WGR and WEBR. He attended Bennett High School and was valedictorian of the Class of 1946.

Booke enrolled in Columbia University at 16, and performed in Shakespearean plays in Columbia's drama club. He graduated from Columbia at 19 in 1949, and received a Master of Fine Arts at the Yale School of Drama. He once starred in a stage production of Beethoven with Paul Newman while at Yale. He served in the United States Army during the Korean War for two years as a counterintelligence officer.

== Career ==
=== Theatre ===
After his Army service, Booke appeared off-Broadway in The White Devil and had his first television role in the series Omnibus. His Broadway debut was in 1956, in Michael Redgrave's production of The Sleeping Prince.

One prominent early role was that of Senator Billboard T. Rawkins in the 1960 revival of Finian's Rainbow.

In 1962, he starred in the Broadway musical Fiorello! as the title character.

=== Film and television ===
He also appeared in the films Black Like Me, A Fine Madness, What's Up, Doc? and Fail Safe.

Aside from his film roles, he appeared on numerous television shows such as Gunsmoke, Cannon, Ironside, Route 66, Hawaii Five-O, The Rockford Files, Full House, The Guiding Light and 12 O'Clock High.

Booke received an Emmy nomination for his appearance in Dr. Kildare in the episode "What's God to Julius?". He appeared in an episode of Mission: Impossible from the first season in 1966. Booke appeared in two early episodes of M*A*S*H, as General Barker in "Requiem for a Lightweight" and "Chief Surgeon Who?"; the latter marked the debut of the character Corporal Klinger, with whom Booke's character had previously dealt. He also had a recurring role in All in the Family as Mr. Sanders, personnel manager at Archie Bunker's workplace, Prendergast Tool and Die Company. (He had previously appeared on All in the Family as Lyle Bennett, the manager of a local television station.) Booke was featured on an episode of Good Times, and had a recurring role as the Jewish mob boss "Lefkowitz" on Soap. He also appeared in two episodes of Columbo, "Swan Song" in Season 3 (featuring Johnny Cash) and "The Bye-Bye Sky High I.Q. Murder Case" in Season 6. In 1976 he played a record producer in Rich Man, Poor Man Book II.

==== The Dukes of Hazzard ====
Booke's most notable role was in The Dukes of Hazzard as Boss Hogg, the humorously wicked antagonist to Bo and Luke Duke. The series ran on CBS for seven seasons, from 1979 to 1985. It spawned an animated series, The Dukes (1983), two reunion TV specials (by which time Booke had died, and the character of Boss Hogg was also said to be deceased), a feature film (2005) and The Dukes of Hazzard: The Beginning (a 2007 TV movie).

Regarding his performance, Booke was 5 ft 6 in (1.68 m) tall, weighed 185 pounds (84 kg) at the time of his Boss Hogg role, and wore padding to seem fatter. He copied the Hogg character's American South drawl from U.S. senators Sam Ervin and Strom Thurmond. He called his Boss Hogg character "despicable", but enjoyed meeting fans of the show.

=== Voice acting ===
By the late 1980s, Booke had stopped appearing physically in acting roles, but he continued to perform voice work on several television shows and movies, occasionally as narrator, and sometimes as a cartoon character's voice, in such movies as Scooby-Doo Meets the Boo Brothers (1987 television movie), Gravedale High (1990 television series), and Rock-a-Doodle (1991).

=== Other work ===
Booke also was a guest conductor at the Buffalo Philharmonic Orchestra.

== Personal life ==
Booke was a polyglot, speaking five languages fluently including Japanese and Russian.

Booke married Miranda Knickerbocker, then a senior at Barnard College, in 1958. She was the daughter of journalist Hubert Renfro Knickerbocker. They had two children before divorcing in 1973.

== Death ==
On February 11, 1994, Sorrell Booke died of colorectal cancer in Sherman Oaks, California. He is interred at Hillside Memorial Park Cemetery in Culver City, California.

== Partial filmography ==
- Gone Are the Days! (1963) as Ol' Cap', Stonewall Jackson Cotchipee
- Black Like Me (1964) as Dr. Jackson
- Joy House (1964) as Harry
- Fail Safe (1964) as Congressman Raskob
- A Fine Madness (1966) as Leonard Tupperman
- Up the Down Staircase (1967) as Dr. Bester
- Matchless (1967) as Colonel Coolpepper
- The Borgia Stick (1967) as Alton
- Bye Bye Braverman (1968) as Holly Levine
- What's Up, Doc? (1972) as Harry
- Slaughterhouse-Five (1972) as Lionel Merble
- The Iceman Cometh (1973) as Hugo Kalmar
- The Take (1974) as Oscar
- Devil Times Five (1974) as Harvey Beckman
- Bank Shot (1974) as Al G. Karp
- The Manchu Eagle Murder Caper Mystery (1975) as Dr. Melon
- Mastermind (1976) as Max Engstrom
- Special Delivery (1976) as Hubert Zane
- Freaky Friday (1976) as Mr. Dilk
- The Other Side of Midnight (1977) as Lanchon
- Record City (1978) as Coznowski
- The Cat from Outer Space (1978) as Presiding Judge (uncredited)
- Rock-a-Doodle (1991) as Pinky, the Manager (voice)

== Television work ==
- The Guiding Light (1952)
- The Iceman Cometh (1960) - as Hugo Kalmar
- Naked City (1960-1963, 9 episodes)
- The Million Dollar Incident (1961) - as Press Agent
- Victoria Regina (1961) - as James
- Car 54, Where Are You? (1962) - as Police Commissioner Harper in "How High Is Up?"
- Armstrong Circle Theatre (1962) - as Mr. Olivera in "Anatomy of Betrayal: Dateline Cuba"
- The Defenders (1962) - as Prosecutor in "Blood County"
- Route 66 (1962) - as Sam Frazier in "Voice at the End of the Line"
- The Nurses (1962) - as Adler in "A Private Room"
- The DuPont Show of the Week (1963) - as Jake Resnick in "The Legend of Lylah Clare"
- Look Up and Live (1963-1964, 2 episodes)
- Bob Hope Presents the Chrysler Theatre (1963-1965, 2 episodes)
- Dr. Kildare (1963-1965, 3 episodes)
- NBC Children's Theatre (1964) - as Sheriff of Nottingham in "Robin Hood"
- The Great Adventure (1964) - as E.W. Ross in "Escape"
- The Patty Duke Show (1964) - as Gilbert Tugwell in "Block That Statue"
- 12 O'Clock High (1965) - as Sgt. Aronson in "Faith, Hope, and Sgt. Aronson"
- Slattery's People (1965) - as Max Rice in "Question: What's a Swan Song for a Sparrow?"
- Barnaby (1965) - as W.C. Fields
- New York Television Theatre (1965-1966, 2 episodes)
- Preview Tonight (1966) - as Baker in "Great Bible Adventures: Seven Rich Years and Seven Lean"
- T.H.E. Cat (1966) - as Mr. Smith in "To Kill a Priest"
- The Borgia Stick (1967) as Alton
- The Girl from U.N.C.L.E. (1967) - as Sydney Morehouse in "The Double-O-Nothing Affair"
- Mission: Impossible (1967) - as Peter Kiri in "Shock"
- Ironside (1968) - as Arthur Justin in "Shell Game"
- The Wild Wild West (1968) - as Heisel in "The Night of the Egyptian Queen"
- CBS Playhouse (1969) - as Timmons in "Sadbird"
- Hawaii Five-O (1970) - as Dr. Sam Berman in "The Double Wall"
- Room 222 (1971) - as Mr. Bomberg in "Mr. Bomberg"
- The F.B.I. (1971) - as Chip Tyler in "The Fatal Connection"
- Cannon (1971) - as Leon in "Death Chain"
- Owen Marshall, Counsellor at Law (1971-1972, 2 episodes)
- The Manhunter (1972) - as Carl Auscher
- The Adventures of Nick Carter (1972) - as Dr. Zimmerman
- M*A*S*H (1972, 2 episodes) - as Gen. Wilson Spaulding Barker
- Temperatures Rising (1972) - as Harry in "The Accident Con"
- Gunsmoke (1972) - as Gerald Pandy in "Milligan"
- Alias Smith and Jones (1972) - as Conrad Meyer Zulick in "The Strange Fate of Conrad Meyer Zulick"
- All in the Family (1972-1977) as Joseph Sanders (4 episodes) / Mr. Bennett (1 episode)
- Young Dr. Kildare (1973) - as Klein in "The Accident"
- The New Perry Mason (1973) - as Milo Vernon in "The Case of the Horoscope Homicide"
- Honeymoon Suite (1973) - as Howard in segment "My Fair Hillbilly"
- The New Dick Van Dyke Show (1973-1974, 2 episodes)
- Kung Fu (1974) - as Sheriff Hodges in "A Dream Within a Dream"
- Dr. Max (1974) - as Dr. Scott Herndon
- The Last Angry Man (1974) - as Dr. Max Vogel
- The Manhunter (1974) - as Sellers in "The Trunk Murders"
- The Lives of Benjamin Franklin (1974, 2 episodes) - as Cochin
- Columbo (1974) - as J.J. Stringer in "Swan Song"
- Police Story (1975) - as Herbie in "Incident in the Kill Zone"
- Archer (1975) - as Leo Berkowitz in "The Arsonist"
- Kolchak: The Night Stalker (1975) - as Mr. Eddy in "Legacy of Terror"
- Adventures of the Queen (1975) - as Robert Dwight
- The Streets of San Francisco (1975) - as Quincy Lloyd in "Murder by Proxy"
- Run, Joe, Run (1975) - as Beecham in "The Long Wait"
- On the Rocks (1975, 2 episodes)
- Joe and Sons (1975-1976, 3 episodes)
- Harry O (1976) - as Edward Tabor in "The Mysterious Case of Lester and Dr. Fong"
- Brenda Starr (1976) - as A.J. Livwright
- Zero Intelligence (1976) - as Deerfield
- The Bob Newhart Show (1976) - as Mr. Perlmutter in "Send This Boy to Camp"
- Rich Man, Poor Man Book II (1976, 5 episodes) - as Phil Greenberg
- Mary Hartman, Mary Hartman (1977, 2 episodes) - as Rabbi Weintraub
- Black Sheep Squadron - (1977) as Father Phillipe in "Poor Little Lambs"
- The Amazing Howard Hughes (1977) - as Fiorello LaGuardia
- Kingston: Confidential (1977) - as Lloyd Harwin in "Triple Exposure"
- Columbo: The Bye-Bye Sky High I.Q. Murder Case (1977) as Bertie Hastings
- Operation Petticoat (1977, 2 episodes) - as Captain 'Noway' Sawyer
- The Greatest Thing That Almost Happened (1977) - as Samuelson
- Once Upon a Brothers Grimm (1977) - as King of Hesse
- Hunter (1977) - as Mervyn in "The Lovejoy Files"
- Little House on the Prairie (1978) - as Mr. Watson in "I Remember, I Remember"
- Good Times (1978) - as Mr. Galbraith in "I Had a Dream"
- Soap (1978, 4 episodes) - as Charles Lefkowitz
- The Rockford Files (1978) - as Wade G. Ward in "The Jersey Bounce"
- What's Happening!! (1978) - as Mr. Finley in "Basketball Brain"
- Greatest Heroes of the Bible (1978)
- Bigfoot and Wildboy (1979)
- The Dukes of Hazzard (1979–1985) - as Boss Hogg / Jefferson Davis Hogg
- The Love Boat (1980, 2 episodes) - as Lucius Kergo
- Alice (1983) - as Jefferson Davis 'Boss' Hogg in "Mel Is Hogg-Tied"
- The Dukes (1983) - as Jefferson Davis 'Boss' Hogg (voice)
- The Pound Puppies (1985) - as Mayor Fist aka The Mayor (voice)
- Newhart (1985) - as Sheik Fraser in "The Geezers in the Band"
- Crazy Like a Fox (1986) - as Bernard 'Bernie' Sinclair in "The Fox Who Saw Too Much"
- You Again? (1986) - as Roger Davidson in "Small Change"
- Blacke's Magic (1986) - as Karkin in "Last Flight from Moscow"
- Scooby-Doo Meets the Boo Brothers (1987) - as Sheriff Rufus Buzby / T.J. Buzby (voice)
- Pound Puppies (1987) - as Officer Edgar (voice) in "The Rescue Pups/Good Night, Sweet Pups"
- The Smurfs (1988) - as Additional Voices in "Lost Smurf"
- Yogi and the Invasion of the Space Bears (1988) - as Mountain Bear (voice)
- Full House (1988) - as Lionel / Santa Claus in "Our Very First Christmas Show"
- Fantastic Max (1988-1989, 3 episodes) (voice)
- The Adventures of Don Coyote and Sancho Panda (1990) - as Additional Voices in "Pity the Poor Pirate"
- Gravedale High (1990) - as Big Daddy (voice) in "Monster Gumbo"
- Tom and Jerry Kids Show (1990-1992, 4 episodes) - as Announcer (voice) and additional voices
- Capitol Critters (1992) - as (voice) in "Of Thee I Sting"
- Tiny Toon Adventures: How I Spent My Vacation (1992) as Big Daddy Boo (voice)
- Civil Wars (1993) - as Charles Previn in "Alien Aided Affection"
- Bonkers (1993) - as Boss Hoss (voice) in "Love Stuck"
- Captain Planet and the Planeteers (1994) - as Sheriff Hebbs (voice) in "Jail House Flock"

== Stage appearances ==
- The Sleeping Prince (1956)
- Nature's Way (1957)
- Heartbreak House (1959)
- Fiorello! (1959–61) (replacement)
- Finian's Rainbow (1960)
- Caligula (1960)
- Purlie Victorious (1961–62)
- The White House (1964)
- Jonah (1966)
- The Iceman Cometh (1966)
- Come Live with Me (1967)
- Morning, Noon and Night (1968)
