= Laurence Marks (American writer) =

American screenwriter

- Born: August 23, 1915; Atlantic City, New Jersey, U.S.
- Died: January 1, 1993 (aged 77); Van Nuys, California, U.S.
- Occupations: Radio and television writer
- Years active: 1948-1983

Laurence Marks (August 23, 1915 – January 1, 1993) was an American writer for radio and television shows including Hogan's Heroes and M*A*S*H. He received an award from the Writers Guild of America.

According to M*A*S*H creator Larry Gelbart, he and Marks teamed up in 1946 to write for Jack Paar on radio, then moved to writing for Bob Hope at $1,250 a week each.

== Selected filmography ==
Television
Year	Title	Notes
1957	The Danny Thomas Show	Writer, 1 episode
1957–1958	Perry Mason	Teleplay, 3 episodes
1959–1960	The Betty Hutton Show	Writer, 3 episodes
1962	Margie	Writer, 1 episode
1963–1964	The New Phil Silvers Show	Script consultant, 30 episodes
1965–1968	Hogan's Heroes	Writer, 68 episodes
1966	The Donna Reed Show	Writer, 1 episode
1969	The Flying Nun	Writer, 1 episode
1971	The Partners	Writer, 2 episodes
1971–1973	The Doris Day Show	Writer, 15 episode
1972–1978	M*A*S*H	Writer, 28 episodes
1975	Doc	Producer, unknown episodes
1977–1978	Fish	Writer, 2 episodes
