= Odessa Cleveland =

American film and television actress

- Born: 3 March 1944 (age 82); Louisiana, U.S.
- Occupation: Actress
- Years active: 1971–1986
- Website: Odeapp3books

Odessa Cleveland (born 3 March 1944) is a retired American film and television actress.

== Early years ==
Born in Louisiana, Cleveland graduated from Peabody High School. She graduated from Grambling State University with a BS degree in physical education and English and a master's degree in business management and education.

== Career ==
A life member of The Actors Studio, Cleveland is best known for her role as Lieutenant Ginger Bayliss, a recurring character on the television series M*A*S*H, on which she appeared for 26 episodes from 1972 to 1975.

Cleveland also had a guest role in an episode of the CBS-TV series M*A*S*H spin-off Trapper John, M.D. in 1986. Beginning as a receptionist and writer at the Watts Writer's Workshop/Theater in Los Angeles, and under the tutelage of Budd Schulberg, Odessa began appearing in such productions as Black Girl in Search of God at Jim Wood's Studio Watts Theater in Los Angeles.

In 1974, she portrayed Jim's slave wife in the 1974 musical release of Huckleberry Finn.

Cleveland taught in the Los Angeles Unified School District.

== Filmography ==
Year	Film	Role	Notes
1974	Huckleberry Finn	Jim's Wife	

== Television works ==
Year	Series	Role	Notes
1971	The Bold Ones: The New Doctors	Barbara	1 episode: "Glass Cage"
1972–75	M*A*S*H	Lt. Ginger Bayliss	Total of 27 episodes (5 uncredited)
1975	Sanford and Son	Audrey	1 episode: "The Over-the-Hill Gag"
1977	Something for Joey	Judy	TV movie
1982	The Greatest American Hero	Nurse	1 episode: " The Hand-Painted Thai"
1983	Simon & Simon	Nurse	1 episode: "Room 3502"
1986	Trapper John, M.D.	Second Nurse	1 episode: "The Curmudgeon"
