= M*A*S*H =

Franchise of book, film, and TV series

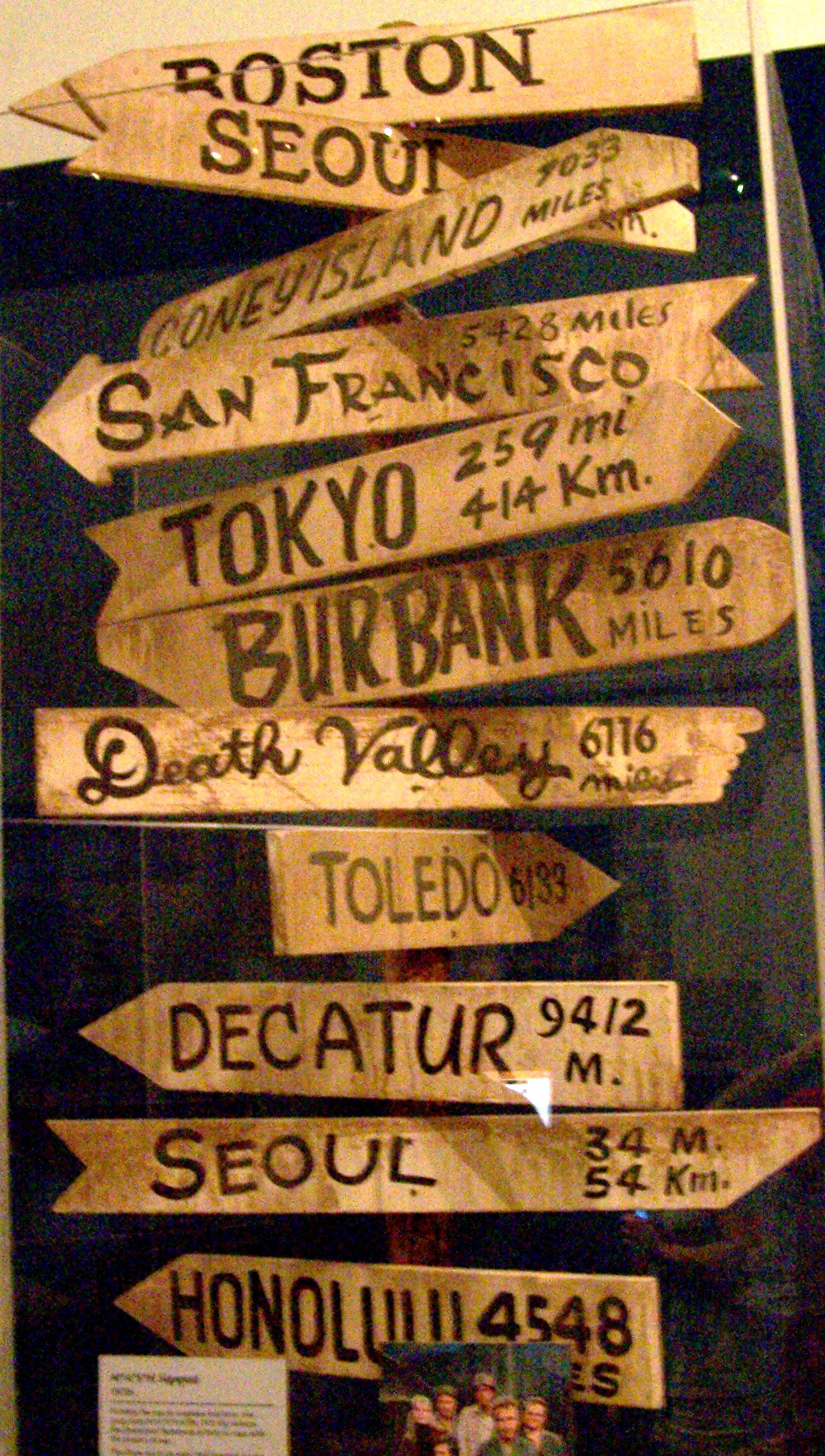
- The fingerpost from the M*A*S*H set, as seen in the Smithsonian Institution
- Created by: Richard Hooker
- Original work: MASH: A Novel About Three Army Doctors (1968)
- Owner: 20th Century Studios

Print publications
- Novel(s): List of novels (1968–1977)

Films and television
- Film(s): M*A*S*H (1970)
- Television series: M*A*S*H (1972–1983); Trapper John, M.D. (1979–1986); AfterMASH (1983–1985)
- Television film(s): W*A*L*T*E*R (1984)

Theatrical presentations
- Play(s): M*A*S*H (1973)

Games
- Video game(s): M*A*S*H (1983)

M*A*S*H (an acronym for Mobile Army Surgical Hospital) is an American media franchise consisting of a series of novels, a film, several television series, plays, and other properties, and based on the semi-autobiographical fiction of Richard Hooker.

The franchise depicts a group of fictional characters who served at the fictional "4077th Mobile Army Surgical Hospital (M*A*S*H)" during the Korean War, loosely based on the historic 8055th MASH unit. Hawkeye Pierce is featured as the main character, played by Donald Sutherland in the 1970 film M*A*S*H and by Alan Alda on the television series also titled M*A*S*H. Later spin-offs involve characters who appeared in the series, but were set after the end of the war. Almost all versions of the series fit into the genre of black comedy or dramedy; the lead characters were doctors, nurses and patients, and the practice of medicine was at the center of events. However, to relieve the pressures of duty in a field hospital close to the front and the attendant horrors of war, the staff engage in humorous hijinks, frivolity, and petty rivalries off-duty.

The franchise effectively ended with the conclusion of Trapper John, M.D. in September 1986. A large fanbase for the series continues to exist; the show has never been out of syndication worldwide, and 20th Century Fox has had notable success selling the film and seasons of the TV series on DVD.

== Novels ==
Richard Hooker wrote MASH: A Novel About Three Army Doctors (1968) based on his experiences as a surgeon at the 8055th MASH in South Korea. He published several other novels based on that group. A total of 15 M*A*S*H novels were published between 1968 and 1977, some co-authored by William E. Butterworth.

== Film ==
M*A*S*H is a 1970 feature film adaptation of the original novel. The film was directed by Robert Altman and starred Donald Sutherland as Hawkeye Pierce and Elliott Gould as Trapper John McIntyre. Although the title had no punctuation onscreen, i.e. "MASH", in posters for the movie and in the trailer, it was rendered as M*A*S*H.

== Television ==
M*A*S*H, a TV adaptation of the film, ran from 1972 to 1983, more than three times as long as the war it chronicled. It starred Alan Alda as Hawkeye Pierce and Wayne Rogers as Trapper John McIntyre. After the third season, Rogers left the show and was replaced by Mike Farrell as B. J. Hunnicutt. That same year, Harry Morgan replaced McLean Stevenson. Morgan, a veteran character actor and former Universal contract player, portrayed Colonel Sherman T. Potter. This series is the most popular and best-known version of the franchise and was ranked #25 in TV Guide's "50 Greatest TV Shows of All Time". Its final episode in 1983 was the most-watched in television history.

Trapper John, M.D. featured the character of Trapper John McIntyre, played by Pernell Roberts, twenty-eight years after the events of the M*A*S*H film and television series. It was the first spin-off to feature a character from the series in civilian life after the war. Legally, Trapper John, M.D. is a direct spin-off of the MASH film rather than the television series due to licensing issues. The pilot episode briefly shows a photograph of Rogers and Alda.

AfterMASH was a successor to the original M*A*S*H television series, featuring Harry Morgan, Jamie Farr, and William Christopher after the war, as the same characters they played in the original television series. Gary Burghoff and Edward Winter also appeared as guests. The series was canceled after two seasons.

W*A*L*T*E*R was the pilot for a television series that was not picked up. It would have featured Gary Burghoff reprising the role of Walter O'Reilly. The pilot was shown as a "CBS Special Presentation" on July 17, 1984.

== Plays ==
In 1973, a play by Tim Kelly, based on the book, television show, and film, was published in both one-act and full versions. The play incorporates many of the characters but omits more of the dark comedy aspects. It is occasionally produced by community theater and high school theater companies.

== In other media ==
The cast from the M*A*S*H series appeared in advertising for IBM products, such as the PS/2 line that introduced the PS/2 connector for keyboards and mice.

Fox developed a M*A*S*H video game that was released for the Atari 2600, Atari 8-bit computers, and TI-99/4A. Players alternate between controlling a helicopter picking up wounded soldiers from the front and a surgeon removing shrapnel from a soldier, similar to Microsurgeon. InfoWorld called M*A*S*H "the exception" among the TI 99/4A's generally poor game library.

Magnum Photos photographer Thomas Dworzak, after having been embedded for several years with US medevac units in Iraq, in 2007 published the photo-book, M*A*S*H*IRAQ. His images of soldiers at work and play, from mess rooms to operating rooms and out in the field, are juxtaposed with the subtitles from the TV series. The book includes a foreword by Mike Farrell.

== List of film and TV characters ==
Character	M*A*S*H				
Character	Film	TV series	Trapper John, M.D.	AfterMASH	W*A*L*T*E*R
Walter (Radar) O'Reilly	Gary Burghoff	Gary Burghoff	Mentioned only	Gary Burghoff	Gary Burghoff
Trapper John McIntyre	Elliott Gould	Wayne Rogers	Pernell Roberts		
Father John Mulcahy	René Auberjonois	William Christopher (George Morgan in the pilot)		William Christopher	
General Hammond	G. Wood	G. Wood			
Hawkeye Pierce	Donald Sutherland	Alan Alda	Mentioned only	Mentioned only	
Margaret Houlihan	Sally Kellerman	Loretta Swit			
Frank Burns	Robert Duvall	Larry Linville		Mentioned only	
Henry Blake	Roger Bowen	McLean Stevenson			
Spearchucker Jones	Fred Williamson	Timothy Brown			
Ho-Jon	Kim Atwood	Patrick Adiarte			
Capt. Ugly John Black	Carl Gottlieb	John Orchard			
Lieutenant Dish	Jo Ann Pflug	Karen Philipp			
1st Lt. Kealani (Nurse Kellye) Nakahara		Kellye Nakahara		(Voice only) Kellye Nakahara	
Ginger Bayliss		Odessa Cleveland			
Maxwell Klinger		Jamie Farr		Jamie Farr	
Sherman T. Potter		Harry Morgan		Harry Morgan	
Soon-Lee Klinger		Rosalind Chao		Rosalind Chao	
Colonel Sam Flagg		Edward Winter		Edward Winter	
Clete Roberts		Himself			Himself
Corporal Judson	Timothy Brown				
Duke Forrest	Tom Skerritt				
Walter 'Painless' Koskiusko Waldowski	John Schuck				
Wade Douglas Vollmer	David Arkin				
Lt. Margie Cutler		Marcia Strassman			
B. J. Hunnicutt		Mike Farrell			
Charles Emerson Winchester III, M.D.		David Ogden Stiers		Mentioned only	
Staff Sergeant Luther Rizzo		G. W. Bailey			
Major Sidney Freedman		Allan Arbus		Mentioned only	
Lt. Col. Donald Penobscott		Beeson Carroll / Mike Henry			
Igor Straminsky		Jeff Maxwell / Peter Riegert			
Staff Sergeant Zelmo Zale		Johnny Haymer			
Stanley Riverside III			Charles Siebert		
Justin 'Jackpot' Jackson			Brian Stokes Mitchell		
Arnold Slocum			Simon Scott		
Melanie McIntyre			Jessica Walter		
Ernestine Shoop			Madge Sinclair		
George 'Gonzo' Gates			Gregory Harrison		
Gloria "Ripples" Brancusi			Christopher Norris		
John J.T. McIntyre			Timothy Busfield		
Clara 'Starch' Willoughby			Mary McCarty		
Libby Kegler			Lorna Luft		
Mildred Potter		Mentioned only		Barbara Townsend / Anne Pitoniak	
Alma Cox				Brandis Kemp	
Michael D'Angelo				John Chappell	
Bob Scannell				Patrick Cranshaw	
Bonnie Hornback				Wendy Schaal	
Dr. Boyer				David Ackroyd	
Gene Pfeiffer				Jay O. Sanders	
Wally Wainright				Peter Michael Goetz	
Wendell Micklejohn					Ray Buktenica
Victoria					Victoria Jackson
Sergeant Sowell					Noble Willingham

== See also ==
- "Suicide Is Painless"
- List of M*A*S*H characters
