= Trapper John, M.D. =

US medical drama TV series

- Genre: Medical drama
- Created by: Richard Hooker
- Developed by: Don Brinkley; Frank Glicksman
- Starring: Pernell Roberts; Gregory Harrison; Mary McCarty; Charles Siebert; Christopher Norris; Brian Mitchell; Madge Sinclair; Timothy Busfield; Lorna Luft; Kip Gilman
- Theme music composer: John Parker
- Country of origin: United States
- Original language: English
- No. of seasons: 7
- No. of episodes: 151 (list of episodes)

Production
- Executive producers: Frank Glicksman (1979–84); Don Brinkley (1984–86)
- Camera setup: Single-camera
- Running time: 45–48 minutes
- Production companies: Frank Glicksman Productions (1979–84); Don Brinkley Productions; 20th Century Fox Television

Original release
- Network: CBS
- Release: September 23, 1979 – September 4, 1986

Related
- M*A*S*H (1970 film); M*A*S*H; AfterMASH

Trapper John, M.D. is an American medical drama television series and spin-off of the film M*A*S*H (1970). Pernell Roberts portrayed the title character, a lovable surgeon who became a mentor and father figure in San Francisco, California. The show ran on CBS for seven seasons, from September 23, 1979, to September 4, 1986. Roberts played the character more than twice as long as had Wayne Rogers (1972–75) on the TV series M*A*S*H. The role of Trapper John was played by Elliott Gould in the film.

== Overview ==
Trapper John, M.D. focuses on Dr. "Trapper" John McIntyre (Pernell Roberts) 28 years after his discharge from the 4077th Mobile Army Surgical Hospital (MASH) in the Korean War. During that time after the war, the character had mellowed considerably. He did not merely learn how to stop fighting the system but became a part of it, in a sense, as the Chief of Surgery at San Francisco Memorial Hospital. However, Trapper shows tremendous compassion toward his patients, often violating "established hospital procedures".

=== Seasons 1–6 ===
Working with Trapper is an aspiring young professional named Dr. George Alonzo Gates (Gregory Harrison), usually referred to as Gonzo, who has a lot in common with Trapper, having also served in a MASH unit (albeit during the later Vietnam War). His sense of humor and love of life also reflect elements of Trapper's younger days. Gonzo resides in his Winnebago motor home (dubbed "The Titanic") in the hospital parking lot.

The cast of Trapper John, M.D. season 6 (1984–85)

The show also involves several other characters that serve as hospital staff.

- Stanley Riverside II (Charles Siebert) is a pompous, status-seeking, but nonetheless capable doctor whose father is the head of the hospital board of directors. He later marries a dentist named E.J. (Marcia Rodd)
- Justin "Jackpot" Jackson (Brian Stokes Mitchell) is a young doctor always interested in wagers.
- Gloria "Ripples" Brancusi (Christopher Norris) is a young nurse who later adopts a sickly, homeless girl, Andrea. Her nickname Ripples was dropped after the first few episodes.
- Clara "Starch" Willoughby (Mary McCarty) is an experienced nurse who had served in the Korean War with Trapper. McCarty died after the first season. In the show's continuity, at the beginning of season 2, her character is said to have married, retired, and moved away.
- Ernestine Shoop (Madge Sinclair) replaces Starch as the experienced older nurse from season 2 onwards. Sinclair picked up three Emmy nominations for her work as the dedicated and dignified Nurse Shoop.
- Arnold Slocum (Simon Scott) is the hospital administrator who often clashes with Trapper and Gonzo, though there is strong mutual respect between all parties. Slocum—though charged with operating within regulations and keeping to a budget—clearly has sympathy and compassion for the patients. Scott suffered from Alzheimer's and made his final appearance in season six before retiring from acting.
- In season six, Trapper's son, J.T. McIntyre (Timothy Busfield), graduates from medical school and arrives at the hospital to work on his internship. He stays for the remainder of the run of the show.

=== Season 7 ===
The show underwent a number of changes during Trapper John's seventh and final season.

- Christopher Norris left the series at the end of season six. Her character Gloria is replaced by new nurse Libby Kegler (Lorna Luft) at the start of season seven.
- Simon Scott, suffering from Alzheimer's disease, had made his final appearance partway through season six. At the beginning of season seven, his character of hospital administrator Arnold Slocum is said to have retired. Slocum is replaced by administrator Catherine Hackett (Janis Paige).
- Added as a recurring player beginning with the season's third episode is ER service helicopter pilot and surgeon, Andy Pagano (Beau Gravitte).
- Mid-way through the season, Gregory Harrison elected to leave the show. The character of Gonzo is written out, as he retires from medicine after having suffered a stroke. Gonzo is replaced by Jacob Christmas (Kip Gilman), a doctor who loses his wife in an accident, and is forced to become a single parent to his young son while adjusting to his new work environment.

Only nine further irregularly-scheduled episodes of Trapper John were produced after Harrison's departure.

After Harrison's last episode, the show was off the air for three weeks, then brought back on a different night (Tuesday) before being pre-empted three times in the next four weeks. A top 30 hit for most of its run when it aired on Sunday, Trapper John, M.D. fell out of the top 30 during season seven, and was canceled by season's end.

The final four episodes were aired on Thursday nights late in the summer of 1986, well after the show's cancellation had already been announced.

== Cast ==
=== Main cast ===
- Pernell Roberts as "Trapper" John McIntyre.
- Gregory Harrison as George Alonzo "Gonzo" Gates.
- Mary McCarty as Clara "Starch" Willoughby (season 1)
- Charles Siebert as Stanley Riverside II.
- Christopher Norris as Gloria "Ripples" Brancusi (seasons 1–6)
- Brian Stokes Mitchell as Justin "Jackpot" Jackson.
- Madge Sinclair as Ernestine Shoop (seasons 2–7)
- Timothy Busfield as John "J.T." McIntyre Jr., M.D. (season 7; recurring season 6)
- Lorna Luft as Libby Kegler (season 7)
- Kip Gilman as Jacob Christmas (season 7)

=== Recurring cast ===
- Simon Scott as Arnold Slocum, Hosp. Administrator (83 episodes, seasons 1-6)
- Jessica Walter as Melanie McIntyre, Trapper's ex-wife. (10 episodes, seasons 1–2, 4–7)
- Richard Schaal as Dr. David Sandler, who becomes Melanie's fiancé. (8 episodes, seasons 2–4, 6–7)
- Janis Paige as Catherine Hackett, the new administrator (15 episodes, season 7)
- Beau Gravitte as Dr. Andy Pagano, ER service helicopter pilot and surgeon. (10 episodes, season 7).
- Character actress Lurene Tuttle guest-starred six times in different roles.

== Episodes ==
Season	Episodes	Originally released	
Season	Episodes	First released	Last released
1	22	September 23, 1979	March 30, 1980
2	18	November 23, 1980	May 17, 1981
3	25	October 4, 1981	May 16, 1982
4	22	September 26, 1982	April 3, 1983
5	22	October 2, 1983	May 6, 1984
6	23	September 30, 1984	May 5, 1985
7	19	October 6, 1985	September 4, 1986

== Development ==
In a suit filed in New York state court, Ingo Preminger, producer of the 1970 motion picture M*A*S*H, claimed that under his deal with 20th Century Fox, his production company had both the right of first refusal to produce any spin-off of the movie, and the right to fees from the use of the book and film's material. New York State Supreme Court Justice Martin Stecher found that Preminger's agreement with Fox did not give him the right to produce Trapper John M.D., but did entitle him to a 25% share in profits from the show. This decision was later cited by the same court in its 2008 decision in Kellman v. Mosley, involving a claim for royalties involving the Easy Rawlins detective series.

It has sometimes been reported that the producers of the television series M*A*S*H (1972-1983) filed suit claiming they were entitled to royalties from the new show, arguing that it was based on the character as portrayed in their series by Wayne Rogers, but the producers of Trapper John, M.D successfully argued that it was based only on the earlier film and Richard Hooker's MASH: A Novel About Three Army Doctors. This appears to be a misconception of the aforementioned suit filed by Ingo Preminger. In fact, the M*A*S*H television series and Trapper John, M.D. were both produced under deals with 20th Century Fox Television, and the M*A*S*H film was produced by parent company 20th Century Fox; as such, the properties were all essentially owned by the same entity.

The Trapper John, M.D. pilot episode includes video clips (part of a dream) taken from the M*A*S*H film and TV series, as well as a camera pan across mementoes in Trapper's office including a publicity photo of Trapper (as portrayed by Wayne Rogers) and Hawkeye (Alan Alda), implying Trapper John, M.D. is a continuation of the M*A*S*H television series (and not the film, as is often claimed). Trapper mentions Radar and Hawkeye by name, while waking up from a dream about his time at M*A*S*H. However, none of the other M*A*S*H characters appeared as characters, and references to Trapper's time in Korea were rare.

In 2010 via his blog, Ken Levine, who was a showrunner for M*A*S*H from 1977 to 1979, revealed his production team pulled a practical joke on CBS regarding M*A*S*H episode story outlines submitted to the network: "On M*A*S*H we were only required to write up loglines (a sentence or two)... John Rappaport, one of the M*A*S*H producers, pulled a classic stunt on CBS. The series Trapper John, M.D. was about to premiere that fall on CBS. Among the loglines John submitted was “Hawkeye is devastated to learn that his buddy Trapper John has died back in the States.” John gets a frantic call from the network. “You can’t do that!” they pleaded. “We have a show starring Trapper John.” Rapppaport shrugged and said, “That’s not our problem.” The network insisted they drop the story. John said, “It’s too late. We already filmed it.” The network rep was absolutely apoplectic until John told him it was a goof."
