= William Christopher =

American actor (1932–2016)

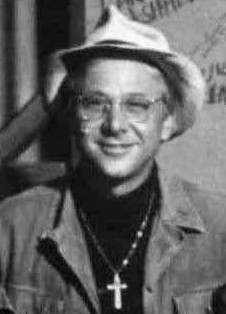
- Christopher as Father Mulcahy
- Born: October 20, 1932; Evanston, Illinois, U.S.
- Died: December 31, 2016 (aged 84); Pasadena, California, U.S.
- Education: Wesleyan University, BA
- Occupation: Actor
- Years active: 1965–2012

William Christopher (October 20, 1932 – December 31, 2016) was an American actor and comedian, best known for playing Private Lester Hummel on Gomer Pyle, U.S.M.C. from 1965 to 1968 and Father Francis John Patrick Mulcahy on the television series M*A*S*H from 1972 to 1983 and its spinoff AfterMASH from 1983 to 1985.

== Early life ==
Christopher was born in Evanston, Illinois, in a family believed to be descendants of Paul Revere. He spent his youth in several of Chicago's northern suburbs, including Winnetka, Illinois, where he attended New Trier High School. Christopher graduated from Wesleyan University in Middletown, Connecticut, with a Bachelor of Arts in drama, focusing on Greek literature. While at university, he participated in fencing, soccer, and the glee club, and was initiated as a member of the Sigma Chi fraternity.

== Career ==
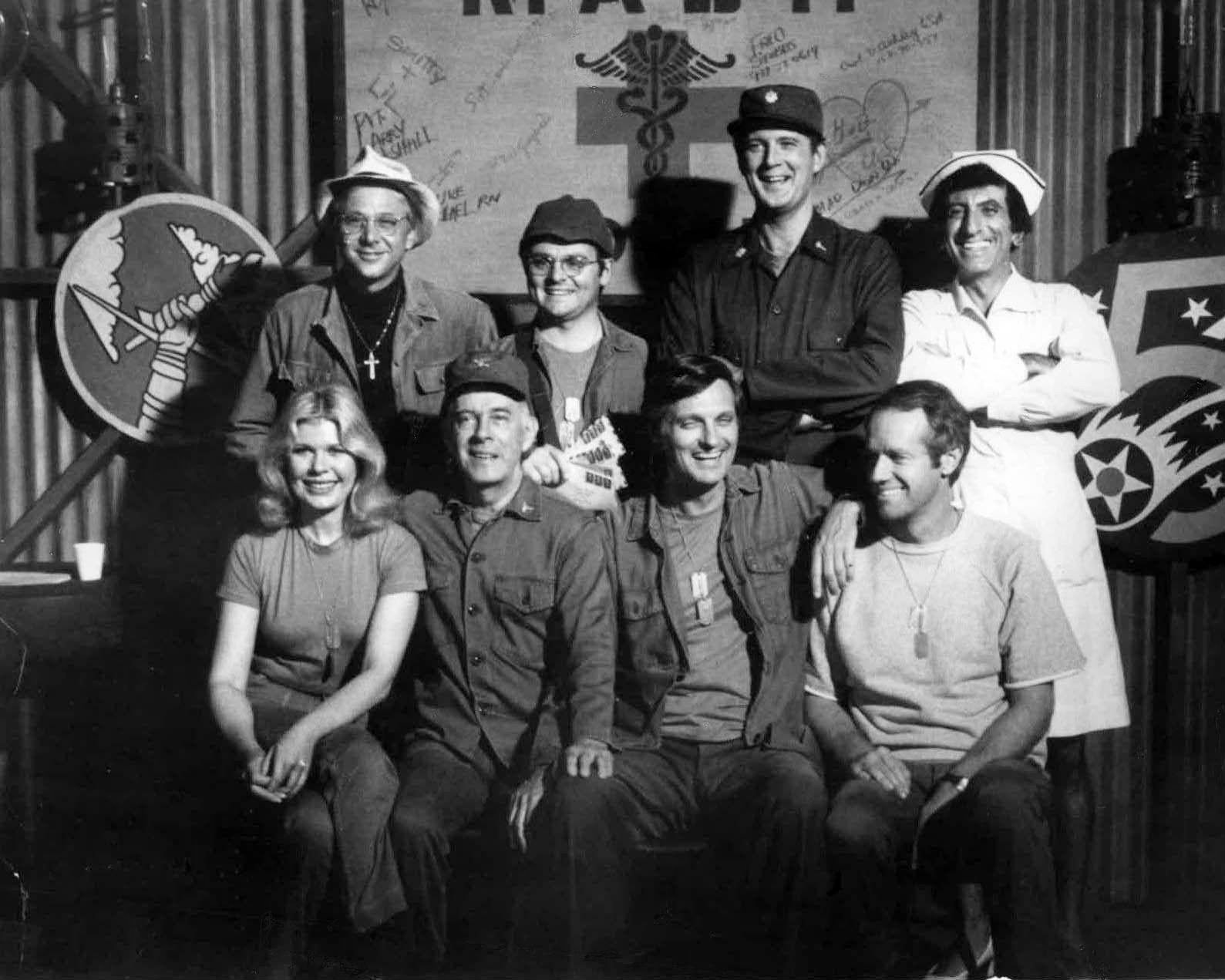
Cast of M*A*S*H (1977). Back row, L–R: William Christopher, Gary Burghoff, David Ogden Stiers, and Jamie Farr. Front row, L–R: Loretta Swit, Harry Morgan, Alan Alda, Mike Farrell

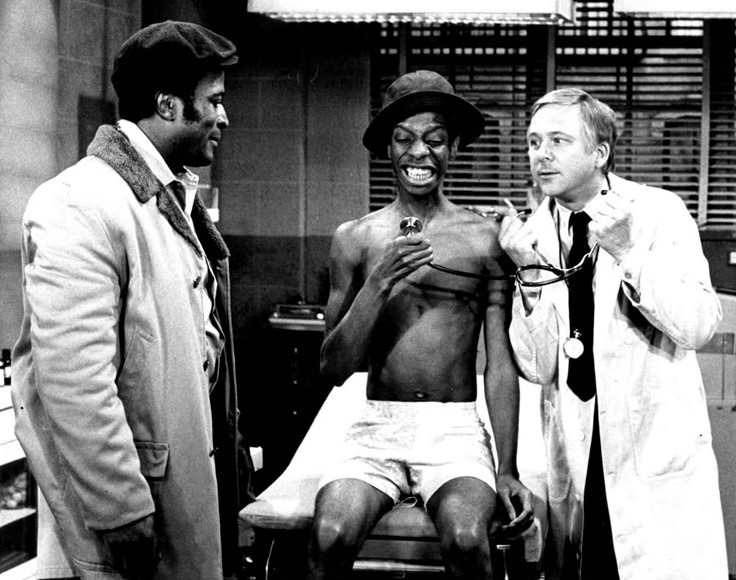
Christopher (right) as an Army doctor on an episode of Good Times. John Amos and Jimmie Walker are also pictured.

Christopher moved to New York and appeared in a variety of regional productions and later a number of off-Broadway productions such as The Hostage at One Sheridan Square. His Broadway debut came in Beyond the Fringe, a British revue, acting alongside Peter Cook and Dudley Moore.

Christopher left New York City for Hollywood to attempt to gain work in television where he guest-starred in several well-known series, including The Andy Griffith Show, Death Valley Days, The Patty Duke Show and The Men from Shiloh. He made several appearances (each time as a different character) on Hogan's Heroes, and had recurring roles on Gomer Pyle, U.S.M.C. and That Girl. Christopher was a student at Harvey Lembeck's famed L.A. improvisational workshop in the early 1970s during which time he performed improv skits (with two other performers, Carole White and Shelia Bartold, both also Lembeck students) during a January 1972 episode of The Carol Burnett Show. While the appearance was officially uncredited, he was introduced by Burnett as Bill Christopher.

In 1972, Christopher gained the role of Father Mulcahy in the television series M*A*S*H when the actor who was first cast in the role, George Morgan, was replaced after a single appearance in the pilot episode. (Christopher was the third actor to play Mulcahy, following René Auberjonois in the 1970 film version of M*A*S*H and George Morgan in the TV pilot episode.)

As Father Mulcahy, Christopher was a recurring cast member of M*A*S*H for the first four seasons of the series before being billed as a regular cast member from season five onwards. During production of the fifth season, Christopher contracted hepatitis and was bedridden for eight weeks, resulting in episodes being rewritten to account for Christopher's absence. The fifth season episode "Hepatitis", written by series star Alan Alda, incorporated Christopher's battle with hepatitis into the show, when Mulcahy was bedridden with the disease. It was reported that production had considered writing Christopher out of the series entirely before Alda advocated on his co-star's behalf.

Christopher remained a regular cast member of M*A*S*H for the duration of the series, concluding with its eleventh season in 1983. Immediately following M*A*S*H, Christopher continued the role of Father Mulcahy for the two seasons of the short-lived 1984-1985 spin-off AfterMASH.

In feature films, Christopher performed in The Fortune Cookie, The Private Navy of Sgt. O'Farrell, The Shakiest Gun in the West, With Six You Get Eggroll, and Hearts of the West. He had parts in telefilms including The Movie Maker, The Perils of Pauline, and For the Love of It. The comedy film With Six You Get Eggroll is notable for fans of M*A*S*H because Jamie Farr and Christopher appear in it together, both playing hippies, five years before they co-starred in the series.

After gaining attention for M*A*S*H, Christopher appeared in various other television series, including Good Times (as the military doctor examining J.J. Evans) and Murder, She Wrote, and made multiple guest appearances on The Love Boat. In 1998, he guest-starred as a priest in an episode of Mad About You. He also remained active in the theater, including a tour of the United States in the mid-1990s with Farr, performing Neil Simon's The Odd Couple on stage. In 2008–2009, he toured with Church Basement Ladies. One of Christopher's last roles was that of a priest (Father Tobias) on the daytime drama Days of Our Lives.

== Charity work ==
Christopher, whose son Ned has autism, devoted much of his spare time to the National Autistic Society, doing public-service announcements to bring attention to autism. In 1988, his wife Barbara and he wrote Mixed Blessings, a book about their experiences in raising Ned.

== Personal life ==
Christopher met his future wife Barbara on a blind date. They married in 1957 and the couple adopted two sons. The two appeared together in the M*A*S*H season 4 episode "Dear Mildred", where they sang the song "All Dressed Up and No Place to Go" in a duet.

== Death ==
Christopher died at his home in Pasadena, California, on December 31, 2016. According to his son John Christopher, the 84-year-old actor died as the result of non-small-cell carcinoma (lung cancer). He had been diagnosed with cancer about 18 months earlier, according to his New York-based agent Robert Malcolm.

== Partial filmography ==
- 1965: 12 O'Clock High (TV series, Episode: "Then Came the Mighty Hunter") as Patient
- 1965: Hank (TV series, Episode: "Candidate") as Elwood
- 1965: The Andy Griffith Show (TV series, 2 episodes) as Mr. Heathcote, IRS
- 1965–1968: Gomer Pyle – USMC (TV series) as recurring character Private Lester Hummel
- 1965: Hogan's Heroes (TV series, 4 episodes) as multiple characters in 1965, 1966 and 1968
- 1966: The Patty Duke Show (TV series, Episode: "Three Little Kittens") as Man
- 1966: The Fortune Cookie as Intern
- 1967: The Perils of Pauline as Doctor (uncredited)
- 1967: The Andy Griffith Show (TV series, 1 episode) Thomas Peterson, MD
- 1968: The Private Navy of Sgt. O'Farrell as Pvt. Jake Schultz
- 1968: The Shakiest Gun in the West as Hotel Manager (uncredited)
- 1968: With Six You Get Eggroll as Zip-Cloud
- 1969: That Girl Season 4, Episode 14 as Chippy Dolan
- 1972: The Carol Burnett Show Season 5, Episode 15 (January 5, 1972), uncredited appearance, performing improv skits as a student from Harvey Lembeck's workshop with Carol White, and Shelia Bartold, introduced by Burnett as Bill Christopher
- 1972–1983: M*A*S*H (TV series) as Father John Mulcahy
- 1974: Movin' On (TV series, Episode: "Grit") as Jewelry Clerk
- 1975: Hearts of the West as Bank Teller
- 1975: Good Times (TV series, Episode: "The Enlistment") as The Doctor, Major Bullock
- 1983–1985: AfterMASH (TV series) as Father John Mulcahy
- 1985: Murder, She Wrote (TV series, Episode: "A Lady in the Lake") as Burton Hollis
- 1994: Heaven Sent as Priest
- 1998: Mad About You (TV series, Episode: "A Pain in the Neck") as Chaplain Olsen
- 2012: Days of Our Lives (TV series) as Father Tobias (final appearance)
