= W. C. Heinz =

American journalist (1915–2008)

Wilfred Charles Heinz
- Born: January 11, 1915; Mount Vernon, New York
- Died: February 27, 2008 (aged 93); Bennington, Vermont, U.S.
- Occupations: sportswriter, war correspondent, journalist, and author

Wilfred Charles Heinz (January 11, 1915 – February 27, 2008) was an American sportswriter, war correspondent, journalist, and author.

== Newspaper and magazine career ==
Heinz was born in Mount Vernon, New York. Following his graduation from Middlebury College in 1937, he joined the staff of the New York Sun. After serving as one of the newspaper's war correspondents in Europe during the Second World War, Heinz returned to the United States and was awarded his own sports column called "The Sport Scene," which primarily covered boxing, baseball, football and horse racing.

One of his pieces from around this time – Death of a Racehorse, written July 29, 1949 – is famous for its brevity (fewer than 1,000 words) and its quality, having been compared to the Gettysburg Address and the works of Ernest Hemingway. Written on a manual typewriter as the events unfolded, the story describes Air Lift, a promising two-year-old horse who was racing for the first time, and concludes less than two hours later: Air Lift broke a leg during that first race, and had to be euthanized.

Heinz became a freelance writer after The Sun ceased publishing in 1950. He was a regular contributor to magazines such as SPORT, Life, The Saturday Evening Post, Esquire, True, Collier's, and Look. The best of his magazine and newspaper pieces are published in his books American Mirror, What A Time It Was: The Best of W.C. Heinz on Sports and The Top of His Game: The Best Sportswriting of W. C. Heinz.

== Books ==
He published his first book in 1958, a novel called The Professional, the story of a young fighter pursuing the middleweight boxing championship. Ernest Hemingway called the book "the only good novel I've ever read about a fighter, and an excellent novel in its own right." Heinz edited two boxing anthologies, The Fireside Book of Boxing and The Book of Boxing with Nathan Ward.

Heinz's additional books include Run to Daylight with football coach Vince Lombardi, The Surgeon, following a physician through a typical working day; Emergency and Once They Heard the Cheers, in which the author travels the country revisiting sports heroes of his past.He also wrote the highly acclaimed magazine article, "The Rocky Road of Pistol Pete" about a baseball player, Pete Reiser, who fought through countless injuries to play the game that he loved.

InIn the late 1960s, Heinz collaborated with H. Richard Hornberger to write the novel MASH, published under Hornberger's pen name Richard Hooker. The book was the precursor to the film MASH, which won the award for best film of the 1970 Cannes Film Festival and an Academy Award for best screenplay based on another medium in 1971. The book also served as the prototype for the long-running, Emmy Award-winning television series. In 2015, the Library of America published a collection of his best sportswriting, The Top of His Game.

A collection of Heinz's war writings including his dispatches from Europe and some post-war articles were republished in his book, When We Were One: Stories of World War II.

== Other ==
Heinz was a five-time winner of the E. P. Dutton Award for best magazine story of the year. He won the A. J. Liebling Award for outstanding boxing writing, and his work has been reprinted in more than 60 anthologies and textbooks. He was inducted into the National Sportscasters and Sportswriters Association Hall of Fame in 2001 and into the International Boxing Hall of Fame in 2004. In 2008, the Associated Press Sports Editors posthumously awarded him the Red Smith Award for his contributions to sports journalism.

Heinz died on February 27, 2008, in Bennington, Vermont, at age 93.
