= W*A*L*T*E*R =

American television pilot

- Created by: Larry Gelbart; Gene Reynolds
- Based on: Walter O'Reilly by Richard Hooker
- Written by: Bob Weiskopf; Bob Schiller; Everett Greenbaum
- Directed by: Bill Bixby
- Starring: Gary Burghoff; Ray Buktenica; Victoria Jackson; Noble Willingham
- Music by: Patrick Williams
- Country of origin: United States
- Original language: English
- No. of episodes: 1

Production
- Executive producers: Bob Schiller; Bob Weiskopf; Michael Zinberg
- Producer: Michael Zinberg
- Cinematography: William Jurgensen
- Editors: Stanford Tischler; Noel Rogers
- Running time: 30 minute pilot / CBS Special Presentation
- Production company: 20th Century Fox Television

Original release
- Network: CBS
- Release: July 17, 1984

Related
- M*A*S*H; AfterMASH

W*A*L*T*E*R is a 1984 American television pilot for the third spin-off of M*A*S*H. It stars Gary Burghoff, who reprises his M*A*S*H character.

The episode chronicles the adventures of Corporal Walter "Radar" O'Reilly after he returns home from the Korean War. No longer calling himself "Radar", he has moved away from Iowa after sending his mother to live with his aunt. Settling in St. Louis, Missouri, by the beginning of the series, he has become a police officer.

== Plot ==
No longer using his army nickname "Radar", Walter O'Reilly is now a rookie police officer living in St. Louis with his colleague and cousin Wendell Micklejohn. As they get ready for work they are watching the start of a television interview by Clete Roberts, who is following up with various former staff from the 4077th; the previous week Roberts had interviewed Hawkeye Pierce, and this week Walter's interview was being televised. At the police department and through a store front window, Walter and Wendell catch bits of the interview, giving viewers of the pilot a chance to bridge the events of M*A*S*H and AfterMASH with W*A*L*T*E*R.

In flashbacks during the interview scenes, viewers learn that Walter had returned home to Iowa but failed at farming and was forced to sell the farm and livestock and then he sent his mother to live with his aunt. After marrying his bride in River Bend (as shown in an episode of AfterMASH), she left him for his best friend during their honeymoon in St. Louis. Having hit rock bottom, a wandering Walter went to a drug store to buy an overdose of sleeping pills (and aspirin, as sleeping pills gave him a headache), but the drugstore clerk, Victoria, dissuaded him and they became friends. Wendell then helped Walter get a job with the city police. Walter solves a dispute between two strippers, and gets his wallet back from a young would-be thief whose father was killed in Korea.

== Cast ==
- Gary Burghoff as Officer Walter O'Reilly
- Ray Buktenica as Officer Wendell Micklejohn
- Victoria Jackson as Victoria
- Noble Willingham as Sergeant Sowell
- Meeno Peluce as Elston Krennick
- Clete Roberts as The Interviewer
- Sam Scarber as Haskell
- Lyman Ward as Bigelow
- Sarah Abrell as Judith Crane
- Larry Cedar as Zipkin
- Victoria Carroll as Bubbles Sincere
- June Berry as Dixie Devoe
- Dick Miller as The Theater Owner

== Production ==
Since the pilot was never picked up by CBS as a series, it was shown as a "CBS Special Presentation" on July 17, 1984. It was shown once in the Eastern and Central time zones of the United States, but pre-empted on the West Coast and in the Mountain time zone by CBS News coverage of the Democratic National Convention. This is the only known broadcast of the pilot.
