= AfterMASH =

1980s American comedy TV series; sequel to M*A*S*H

- AfterMASH title screen (season 1)
- Created by: Larry Gelbart; Gene Reynolds; Ken Levine; David Isaacs
- Based on: MASH: A Novel About Three Army Doctors by Richard Hooker
- Starring: Harry Morgan; Jamie Farr; William Christopher; Rosalind Chao; John Chappell; Jay O. Sanders; Barbara Townsend; David Ackroyd; Anne Pitoniak; Peter Michael Goetz; Brandis Kemp
- Country of origin: United States
- Original language: English
- No. of seasons: 2
- No. of episodes: 31

Production
- Executive producer: Burt Metcalfe
- Camera setup: Single-camera
- Running time: 22–25 minutes
- Production company: 20th Century Fox Television

Original release
- Network: CBS
- Release: September 26, 1983 – May 31, 1985

Related
- M*A*S*H; W*A*L*T*E*R

AfterMASH is an American sitcom television series produced as a spin-off and continuation of M*A*S*H that aired on CBS from September 26, 1983, to May 31, 1985. It was developed as the sequel series as it takes place immediately following the end of the Korean War and chronicles the postwar adventures of three main characters from the original series: Colonel Sherman T. Potter (Harry Morgan), Sergeant Maxwell Klinger (Jamie Farr) and Father John Mulcahy (William Christopher).

== Production ==
AfterMASH was developed as a vehicle for Morgan, Farr, and Christopher (as they were the only main cast members of M*A*S*H who wanted the series to continue beyond an eleventh season when a vote was taken prior to production of what was to be the final season of M*A*S*H). Rosalind Chao rounded out the starring cast as Soon-Lee Klinger, a Korean refugee whom Klinger met, fell in love with, and married in the prior series finale "Goodbye, Farewell and Amen". M*A*S*H supporting cast-member Kellye Nakahara joined them, albeit off-camera, as the voice of the hospital's public address system, and former M*A*S*H regular Gary Burghoff and recurring player Edward Winter made guest appearances as Radar O'Reilly and Colonel Samuel Flagg respectively.

The series was created by Larry Gelbart, who had developed M*A*S*H and acted as showrunner for its first four seasons. Also involved with the production of AfterMASH were Burt Metcalfe (the only producer to stay with the M*A*S*H during its entire run from 1972 to 1983) and writer/producers Ken Levine and David Isaacs, who worked on M*A*S*H in its fifth to eighth seasons.

AfterMASH made frequent references to M*A*S*H, and likewise featured storylines that highlighted the horrors and suffering of war, from the non-combat perspective of a veterans' hospital. The series was released to much fanfare but was later subjected to much retooling (including changes to its supporting cast, theme music, and timeslot) and suffered diminishing ratings before its cancellation in 1985 after two seasons, the second of which was cut short with only nine episodes produced (one of which did not air in the USA). A total of 31 episodes of AfterMASH were produced and broadcast.

== Broadcast ==
AfterMASH premiered in late 1983 in the same Monday at 9 p.m. time slot as its predecessor, M*A*S*H. It finished at No. 15 out of 101 network shows for the 1983–1984 season according to Nielsen Media Research television ratings. For its second season, CBS moved the show to Tuesday nights at 8:00 p.m., opposite NBC's Top 10 hit The A-Team, and launched a marketing campaign featuring illustrations by Sanford Kossin of Max Klinger in a female nurse's uniform shaving off Mr. T's signature mohawk, theorizing that AfterMASH would take a large portion of the A-Team audience. The opposite occurred, as AfterMASH's ratings plummeted to near the bottom of the television rankings, leading to its cancellation just nine episodes into its second season, finishing at only No. 72 out of 77 shows for the 1984–1985 season. Meanwhile, The A-Team continued until 1987, with 97 episodes.

== Reception ==
Critics were mostly negative about the program. In 1999, Time magazine listed the show as one of the 100 worst ideas of the century, and in 2002, TV Guide listed it as the seventh-worst TV series ever.

Ken Levine later named AfterMASH when asked what was the worst thing he'd written, stating, "It's hard to top (or bottom) AfterMASH," before adding sarcastically, "Take the three weakest characters of M*A*S*H, put them in the hilarious confines of a Veteran's Hospital and you have a recipe for classic comedy." When Burt Metcalfe died in 2022, Levine - who described Metcalfe as "the best boss I ever worked for. More like a father figure, role model, and mentor" - wrote, "When I am asked why we did AfterMASH, a big reason was the chance to work with Burt again. You just don't meet wonderful quality people like that very often — especially in this industry. I would have happily signed aboard for After-AfterMASH if Burt were running it." In his blog in 2011, Levine wrote, "People always wonder why I wrote for AfterMASH. Because it was a chance to work with Larry Gelbart. I established a life-long friendship, and got to learn at the feet of the absolute master. Tell me you wouldn’t jump at that chance, too."

On the subject of AfterMASH, Larry Gelbart stated,

The show was far less than brilliant. I take full responsibility for its failure. If I hadn't been so in love with the title, I might have thought out the show to go with it in a more objective way. I knew the series would inherit Potter, Mulcahy, and Klinger. I knew, too, that good as these people are, a leading player was going to be necessary. There was an attempt to build up a central character, a doctor who had lost his leg in Korea, and played wonderfully by David Ackroyd, but other attempts at making a show with its own tone, style and intent were not as successful. Probably, an hour show would have been a better format... Oh, well, you win some and you lose some (except on TV you lose in front of a whole lot of people).

Gelbart also stated,

The series needed a top banana, and we didn't have one. That's not to dismiss the actors who were in the cast. They were basically supporting players and you have to be in support of something, and we didn't have that element. If I had to do it all over again (and thank God I don't have to), I would make it an hour show, more dramatic in nature, with comedy overtones rather than the other way around. There are probably 23 or 24 million veterans in this country. There's an audience out there who recognizes what happens in the VA, but I just took the wrong approach.

Writing for The A.V. Club in 2015, Noel Murray stated,

The failure of AfterMASH has been overstated a bit. Looking at it in retrospect, the show suffers from unflattering comparisons to M*A*S*H and from the sour feelings of its creators, who fought with CBS executives over how best to "fix" a show that wasn't terrible, just mediocre. (That's another way that AfterMASH was like Joey, which also wasn't as bad as its reputation now suggests.) The sitcom's first season finished in the Top 15 in the year-end Nielsen ratings, and the episode "Fallout"—about cancer patients who'd been harmed by atomic testing—was nominated for an Emmy.

William Christopher, who played Father Mulcahy, stated,

For the most part, AfterMASH is not worth talking about. I think there was one tragic flaw, it wasn't serious enough. But I was very pleased when I heard they were going to do it. The network wanted a zany comedy, and so the emphasis became trying to make it funny. I thought we should have done an hour show, like St. Elsewhere. A lot of veterans came back with problems, but we were doing wheelchair races in the hospital. Larry Gelbart wrote the show that paralleled the Agent Orange problem in Vietnam. The hospital was sort of a joke hospital, not a real one.

In a book largely focused on the parent series of AfterMASH, Dale Sherman wrote,

In retrospect, [AfterMASH] wasn't a bad idea. The problem was the network got cold feet and tried to imagine it as a version of the previous show that hadn't been there since the early days. M*A*S*H had changed, and more than half of its run found it dealing with dramatic topics and a few gags here and there, not the other way around. AfterMASH was continuing that tradition, and it would be one that would run through other programs after it that fashioned themselves as comedies with dramatic moments. It was ahead of its time in that way, yet for CBS it was a Frankenstein monster that had been built out of parts of the former body and other pieces. Instead of trying to shape the show as it went along – which CBS had allowed the original series to do – the network forced changes that hurt its integrity. In doing so, AfterMASH is remembered as one of the worst programs ever, a reputation based solely on the fact it didn't perform up to the standards of M*A*S*H. It is a reputation not really deserved, but still stands. Even those who worked on the series would have little to say about it afterwards... After the glow of M*A*S*H, which ended as a television triumph, it was painful to admit that the gloss had been somewhat dimmed by what occurred in AfterMASH.

== Home media ==
Unlike M*A*S*H, AfterMASH has never been released on home media (VHS, DVD, etc), was never re-run in syndication, and has never been made available on any official streaming services. The status of the series' original master tapes or videotape copies is unknown, although off-air recordings of the series circulate unofficially.

== Synopsis ==
=== Season one ===
In the one-hour pilot episode "September of '53"/"Together Again", Colonel Potter returns home from South Korea to his wife Mildred (Barbara Townsend) in Hannibal, Missouri. He soon finds enforced retirement stifling, and Mildred suggests he return to work. Potter is soon hired by the bombastic and bureaucratic hospital administrator Mike D'Angelo (John Chappell) as the chief of staff at General Pershing Veterans' Hospital ("General General"), located in a fictional version of River Bend, Missouri.

After a delayed return from Korea to help his bride, Soon Lee, find her family, Max Klinger finds himself ostracized from his family (who did not approve of his marrying a Korean woman), and in trouble with the law in Toledo, Ohio. Potter writes to him, and offers him a job as his administrative assistant. Klinger's nemesis at General General is D'Angelo's executive secretary Alma Cox (Brandis Kemp), a mean-spirited woman who is forever trying to "get the goods" on him, from rifling through his desk to giving him just one day to prepare for a civil service exam, the latter of which, despite her underhanded efforts, he still manages to pass.

Father Mulcahy, whose hearing was damaged in the final episode of M*A*S*H, is suffering from depression and drinking heavily. Potter arranges for him to receive an operation at another VA Hospital in St. Louis. After his hearing is surgically corrected, he stops drinking and joins Potter and Klinger at "General General" as its Catholic chaplain.

Also on hand is the idealistic, talented, and often hungry young resident surgeon Gene Pfeiffer (Jay O. Sanders), attractive secretary Bonnie Hornbeck (Wendy Schaal), who has her eye on Klinger, and old-timer Bob Scannell (Patrick Cranshaw), who served under then-Sergeant Potter in World War I and was now a hospital resident of 35 years (thanks to his exposure to mustard gas). Unlike the other patients and staff who address Potter by his retired rank of colonel, Scannell calls him "Sarge" at Potter's request.

Halfway through the first season, Dr. Mark Boyer (David Ackroyd) was introduced as a hardened veteran who lost a leg in Korea and had a hard time adjusting to civilian life. Despite only having signed on for two episodes, his character began appearing more often toward the end of the season, so often that Dr. Pfeiffer was suddenly pulled from the cast after Dr. Boyer's debut episode.

The only other main character from the original series to appear on AfterMASH was Radar (played by Gary Burghoff), who appeared in a first-season two-part episode. As Potter, Klinger, and Mulcahy prepare to head to Iowa for Radar's wedding, Radar shows up in a panic at Potter's house in Missouri, believing his fiancée has cheated on him in "It Had to Be You". The Radar character later appeared in a pilot called W*A*L*T*E*R, in which Radar moves from Ottumwa, Iowa, to St. Louis, after losing his farm, and his wife leaves him on his wedding night, and he becomes a police officer. (The series was never picked up, and the pilot was aired in July 1984 as a TV special on CBS exclusively in the Eastern and Central time zones; the show was pre-empted in Pacific and Mountain time zones by the 1984 Democratic National Convention. The pilot/special was broadcast by CBS only once.)

The season included home scenes with the Potters, most notably when they are deluged with guests in "Thanksgiving of '53", and Potter tries to keep the phone occupied so Klinger cannot call his relatives, who are on their way over to surprise him; this episode also marked the only onscreen appearance of Potter's oft-mentioned daughter, Evvy Ennis, and Potter's grandson, Corey. One of the season's standout episodes was the Emmy-nominated "Fall Out", where Potter and Pfeiffer consider leaving General General, but reconsider when they link the leukemia seen in a patient with exposure to atomic testing; writer-director Larry Gelbart received a Peabody Award for this episode. The season closed in March, with Klinger being arrested for assaulting a real estate agent as the pregnant Soon-Lee goes into labor. In May, CBS announced the show was renewed for a second season.

=== Season two ===
Season two opened with Klinger escaping from the River Bend County Jail to attend the birth of his child and remaining a fugitive until a judge sends him to the psychiatric unit at General General, where Klinger feigns insanity to avoid prison, and the Potters take in Soon-Lee and the (as yet unnamed) baby. Mike D'Angelo is transferred to Montana and is replaced by smarmy new administrator Wally Wainwright (Peter Michael Goetz). Anne Pitoniak was brought in to replace Barbara Townsend as Mildred Potter. David Ackroyd was promoted to a regular cast member after multiple guest appearances in the second half of the first season. An attractive new psychiatrist, Dr. Lenore Dudziak (Wendy Girard), arrives to begin the daunting task of evaluating Klinger, while Potter is horrified that Wainwright has assigned Alma Cox as his new secretary.

== Relationship with M*A*S*H ==
Only a few of the main and recurring characters from the original series were ever mentioned in the sequel series. Hawkeye was mentioned in a voice-over narration by Father John Mulcahy in the one-hour pilot episode. Major Frank Burns was mentioned twice by Colonel Sherman T. Potter, once in the first season episode "Chief of Staff" and again in a second season episode. In a season 1 episode, "Chief of Staff", Colonel Sherman T. Potter's office was redecorated with all of the items from the 4077th MASH unit including a portrait from Season 10, Episode 21 of M*A*S*H, "Picture This", and it would remain that way throughout the sequel series. The theme song from the original series was also played. In a season 2 episode, "Madness to His Method", Potter writes to Major Sidney Freedman, who had accepted a post at the University of Chicago after leaving Korea and the army, talking about the episode's situation to an unseen character. Edward Winter, who played Colonel Samuel Flagg in the original series, reprised his role in a season 2 episode, "Trials".

While AfterMASH was being produced and renewed for a second season, plans were made for Alan Alda and other actors from the original series to appear in the show as guest stars but it was canceled before the plans were finalized.

Ken Levine wrote in his "By Ken Levine" blog on February 8, 2022,

Way back in 1983 when David Isaacs and I were doing the iconic AfterMASH with Larry Gelbart we ... wanted to build an ensemble that was not dependent on former M*A*S*H cast members.

And that was fine except we started plunging in the ratings. All of a sudden the network and studio wanted ALL M*A*S*H characters brought back... and HURRY!

Well Alan Alda and Mike Farrell were not remotely interested. Neither was David Ogden Stiers. We did manage to get Gary Burghoff to do an episode (which turned out to be one of our better episodes).

But we were sitting in a meeting with 20th Century Fox executives. (The show was produced by 20th Century Fox.) One suit suggested we get Hot Lips back (like we hadn't thought of that). We said we had approached Loretta Swit and she wasn't interested. And then this honest-to-God exchange:

SUIT: Well, why does it have to be Loretta Swit?
ME: Excuse me?
SUIT: Just get another actress and say it's Hot Lips.
ME: Are you serious?
SUIT: Yeah, why not?
ME: Uh... Loretta Swit IS Hot Lips.
SUIT: Shows substitute actors all the time.
ME: But then it wouldn't be a big event if we use another actress.
SUIT: Sure it would. Hot Lips is back. That's all you gotta say.
ME: So we could get Diana Ross and say she's Hot Lips?
SUIT: Say... that's kinda interesting.

This is the kind of idiocy we have to deal with, and ya know what? It's way worse now. Oh... for the record—we did not approach Diana Ross. Or any of The Supremes.

== Characters ==
- Note: Similar to the list on the M*A*S*H page, this table counts double episodes as two episodes, and therefore there are 22 episodes in the first season (with the first episode being double-length), and 9 episodes in the second season, the total being 31.

Actor	Role	Years	Seasons	Episodes
Harry Morgan	Colonel Sherman T. Potter	1983–1985	1–2	31
Jamie Farr	Sergeant Maxwell Klinger	1983–1985	1–2	31
William Christopher	Father John Mulcahy	1983-1985	1–2	31
Kellye Nakahara	PA Announcer	1983-1985	1–2	27
Rosalind Chao	Soon-Lee Klinger	1983–1985	1–2	25
Brandis Kemp	Alma Cox	1983–1985	1–2	21
Barbara Townsend and Anne Pitoniak	Mildred Potter	1983–1984, 1984–1985	1, 2 (actress replaced between seasons)	20
Patrick Cranshaw	Bob Scannell	1983–1985	1–2	20
John Chappell	Mike D'Angelo	1983–1984	1	19
David Ackroyd	Dr. Mark Boyer	1984–1985	1 (second half)–2	14
Lois Foraker	Nurse Coleman	1984–1985	1–2	13
Jay O. Sanders	Dr. Gene Pfeiffer	1983–1984	1 (first half)	12
Peter Michael Goetz	Wally Wainwright	1984–1985	2	7
Noble Willingham / Wally Dalton	Harry, Recovery Room Bartender	1984–1985	1–2	6
Wendy Girard	Dr. Lenore Dudziak	1984–1985	2	5
Wendy Schaal	Bonnie Hornbeck	1983	1	4
Carolsue Walker	Sarah, Prostitute Turned Recovery Room Waitress	1983–1984	1	4
Tom Isbell	Dr. Andy Caldwell	1984–1985	2	3
Gary Burghoff	Corporal Walter "Radar" O'Reilly	1984	1	2
Edward Winter	Colonel Samuel Flagg	1984	2	1

== Episodes ==
=== Series overview ===
Season	Episodes	Originally released	
Season	Episodes	First released	Last released
1	22	September 26, 1983	March 12, 1984
2	9	September 23, 1984	May 31, 1985

=== Season 1 (1983–84) ===
No. overall	No. in season	Title	Directed by (Note: Credits from episode title cards)	Written by	Original release date	Production Code (Note: Production Code from end credits)
1	1	"September of '53"	Burt Metcalfe	Larry Gelbart	September 26, 1983	2E01
A fresh-from-Korea and bored Potter takes a job as Chief of Staff at the General Pershing VA Hospital. He writes a letter to a struggling Klinger, offering him the job of secretary, and Klinger accepts.
2	2	"Together Again"	Nick Havinga	Larry Gelbart	September 26, 1983	2E02
Potter arranges for a depressed, alcoholic Father Mulcahy to come to St. Louis for ear surgery and he eventually decides to take a job as the hospital chaplain.
3	3	"Klinger vs. Klinger"	Will Mackenzie	Ken Levine & David Isaacs	October 3, 1983	2E03
Klinger and Soon-Lee argue about Soon-Lee wanting to get a job, Potter and Pfeiffer operate on a patient without proper identification, and Mulcahy rushes to write his monthly report.
4	4	"Snap, Crackle, Plop"	Nick Havinga	Dennis Koenig	October 10, 1983	2E04
Klinger takes his civil service exam on less than 12 hours' notice, Potter tries to get D'Angelo, who'd rather buy a new canopy, to get a new autoclave, and Mulcahy deals with a patient who thinks God is trying to kill him.
5	5	"Staph Inspection"	Burt Metcalfe	Ken Levine, David Isaacs	October 17, 1983	2E07
Potter deals with a dying World War I friend and patient, Klinger tries to get organized, and Mulcahy tries to control a flasher, all while a staph infection grips the hospital and an inspection is on its way.
6	6	"Night Shift"	Edward H. Feldman	Everett Greenbaum, Elliott Reed	October 24, 1983	2E06
During the night shift at the hospital, Pfeiffer deals with fatigue and overwork, Mulcahy helps a patient see his son, and Klinger searches for missing mattresses, while Potter tries to get back home to a fancy dinner with his wife.
7	7	"Shall We Dance"	Will Mackenzie	Ken Levine, David Isaacs	October 31, 1983	2E05
Alma tries to get From Here to Eternity banned from General Pershing, while Pfeiffer tries to win the affections of Alma's secretary Bonnie, who only has eyes for Klinger.
8	8	"Little Broadcast of '53"	Burt Metcalfe	Dennis Koenig	November 7, 1983	2E08
During an October week at General General, a new nurse adjusts to hospital work and hijinks, Klinger begins to do lunchtime P.A. broadcasts, and Mulcahy deals with a clingy patient.
9	9	"Sunday, Cruddy Sunday"	Nick Havinga	Dennis Koenig	November 14, 1983	2E09
On Visitor's Day at General Pershing, D'Angelo flirts with Mildred Potter's niece, much to Alma's chagrin, a freelance preacher gives false hope to patients, and a healthy man tries to get admitted.
10	10	"Thanksgiving of '53"	Burt Metcalfe	Ken Levine, David Isaacs	November 21, 1983	2E10
It's the first Thanksgiving at home since Korea, and the Potters are deluged with guests, including a camera-bug Mulcahy, all the Klingers from Toledo, a mooching Pfeiffer, and a lonely D'Angelo. Notably, Potter's daughter and grandchildren, who were often mentioned in the original series, appear in this episode.
11	11	"Fallout"	Larry Gelbart	Larry Gelbart	December 5, 1983	2E12
Potter and Pfeiffer consider leaving the bureaucratic VA hospital, but a patient (William Sadler) who contracted leukemia, possibly from radioactive fallout caused by US Government nuclear explosions, causes them to reconsider. Larry Gelbart was nominated for the Outstanding Directing in a Comedy Series Emmy after directing this episode. A Movietone News reel shows Philippines president-elect Ramon Magsaysay on the day of his election victory (10 November 1953).
12	12	"The Bladder Day Saints"	Nick Havinga	Everett Greenbaum, Elliott Reid	December 12, 1983	2E11
During the annual bladder inspection for local vets, Pfeiffer deals with his first death, a patient tries to fake back pain to stay in the hospital, and Klinger begins to feel uncomfortable when he meets a friend from Korea who didn't come back whole.
13	13	"All About Christmas Eve"	Burt Metcalfe	Dennis Koenig	December 19, 1983	2E13
On Christmas Eve, the Klingers announce they are having a baby and a depressed Alma consoles herself by trying to fire Klinger.
14	14	"Chief of Staff"	Burt Brinckerhoff	Gordon Mitchell	January 2, 1984	2E15
As Klinger plans a special surprise for Col. Potter's birthday, Mr. D' Angelo finds out he needs prostate surgery, and a Southern African–American nurse finds it hard to adjust to an integrated hospital.
15	15	"C.Y.A."	Burt Brinckerhoff	Janis Hirsch	January 9, 1984	2E14
Father Mulcahy fights bureaucracy to get the V.A. to pay for his ear surgery and another patient's transportation, Klinger helps out a paralyzed patient, and the hospital scrambles to find a missing patient.
16	16	"Yours Truly, Max Klinger"	Burt Metcalfe	Ken Levine, David Isaacs	January 16, 1984	2E16
Klinger writes Radar a letter about recent events in his life, including Soon-Lee being pregnant with his child, his struggle to sell frozen beef to make a little extra money, and a troublesome new surgeon, Dr. Boyer. This episode is the last appearance of Jay O. Sanders as Dr. Gene Pfeiffer, the first appearance of David Ackroyd as Dr. Boyer, and features a guest appearance by Gary Burghoff reprising his role as Corporal Walter "Radar" O'Reilly.
17	17	"It Had to Be You"	Larry Gelbart	Dennis Koenig, Ken Levine, David Isaacs	January 23, 1984	2E17
Radar takes refuge at the Potters' after he discovers his fiancée was unfaithful. Meanwhile, Doctor Boyer finds it hard to approach women at a local bar.
18	18	"Odds and Ends"	Peter Levin	Everett Greenbaum, Elliott Reid	January 30, 1984	2E18
Klinger resorts to gambling to get money for the coming baby, and Mulcahy helps Scannell write a new will before Scannell goes under the knife.
19	19	"Another Saturday Night"	Jamie Farr	Story by : Dennie Koenig; Teleplay by : Ken Levine, David Isaacs	February 6, 1984	2E19
With the Mrs. out of town for the night, Dr. Potter heads for the local bar for a meal and someone to talk to. Meanwhile, on Potter's advice, D'Angelo begins to socialize with the hospital patients, but causes more harm than help, and Klinger tries to keep up with Soon-Lee's cravings.
20	20	"Fever Pitch"	Burt Metcalfe	Dennis Koenig	February 27, 1984	2E21
A hot day brings a patient who needs his fever cooled. Dr. Boyer wants to use a cooling blanket, but it is not V.A. approved, so he turns to Klinger to get one. Meanwhile, Father Mulcahy is in search of a new place to stay, after life in the rectory turns substandard.
21	21	"By the Book"	Gabrielle Beaumont	Larry Balmagia	March 5, 1984	2E20
A patient suffering from a bacterial infection would recover quickly if given Terramycin, but the Veterans Health Administration will not supply it. A patient recovering from surgery falls under the delusion that he is Superman. Soon Lee helps a vet get in touch with an old flame in Korea. Bob helps Klinger with his latest get-rich-quick scheme: mining uranium.
22	22	"Up and Down Payments"	Burt Metcalfe	Ken Levine, David Isaacs	March 12, 1984	2E22
Klinger gets arrested for punching a crooked real estate agent. Soon-Lee goes into labor. This episode is the last appearance of John Chappell as Mark D'Angelo and Barbara Townsend as Mildred Potter.

=== Season 2 (1984–85) ===
No. overall	No. in season	Title	Directed by	Written by	Original release date	Production Code
23	1	"Less Miserables"	Burt Metcalfe	Ken Levine, David Isaacs, Dennis Koenig	September 23, 1984 (Note: The premiere episode of the second season aired in a time slot different from the regular schedule.)	2W01
While Soon-Lee is being rushed to the delivery room, Klinger stands in a jail cell worried about his wife, and later conspires with another inmate in order to make his escape. Meanwhile, V.A. Administrator Burt Philbrick (Max Wright) tours the hospital, later informing Dr. Potter that Mr. D'Angelo has been replaced. Soon-Lee gives birth to her son, with Max at her side, after he tells everyone he is going to hide out at the hospital.
24	2	"Calling Doctor Habibi"	Hy Averback	Dennis Koenig, Ken Levine, David Isaacs	September 25, 1984	2W02
Wally Wainwright arrives and immediately runs into Klinger, who is still on the run from the law. After introducing himself as Dr. Habibi, Klinger is asked to show Mr. Wainwright around. Meanwhile, Alma is demoted to Potter's clerk and Boyer tries to prove himself to Wainwright, despite his prosthetic leg.
25	3	"Strangers and Other Lovers"	Burt Metcalfe	Dennis Koenig	October 2, 1984	2W03
Potter tries to deal with the overbearing Alma Cox, Boyer beds the wife of a patient, and Klinger is finally arrested.
26	4	"Trials"	Charles S. Dubin	Ken Levine, David Isaacs	October 9, 1984	2W04
Max Klinger's trial finally takes place, with the result of Klinger being found not guilty by reason of insanity. Klinger is also ordered to undergo a psychiatric evaluation. Meanwhile, at the hospital, Mr. Wainwright forces Dr. Boyer into performing a difficult operation. Edward Winter reprises his M*A*S*H role of Colonel Flagg to testify against Klinger.
27	5	"Madness to His Method"	Burt Metcalfe	Tom Straw	October 16, 1984	2W05
Dr. Potter writes to Dr. Sidney Freedman about recent events at the hospital, including news of the hospital's brand new psychiatrist, Dr. Lenore Dudziak (Wendy Girard), who has arrived to perform Klinger's psychological evaluation. Meanwhile, Boyer flirts with Dudziak, Potter tries to connect with a silent patient, and Wainwright decides to serve deluxe meals in the cafeteria to prevent malcontent from the patients.
28	6	"The Recovery Room"	Charles S. Dubin	Jay Folb	October 30, 1984	2W06
The Klinger baby causes friction between Mr. and Mrs. Potter, while Klinger tries to get mental disability from the VA and Dudziak tries to convince Boyer to attend group therapy. Meanwhile, Dr. Andy Caldwell arrives at the hospital for an internship.
29	7	"Ward Is Hell"	Burt Metcalfe	Ken Levine, David Isaacs, Dennis Koenig	December 4, 1984	2W09
Klinger runs a hospital lottery, but trouble ensues when Soon-Lee has the winning ticket. Meanwhile, Dr. Boyer is laid up with a staph infection, bringing his anger and bad attitude to the post-op ward.
30	8	"Saturday's Heroes"	Burt Metcalfe	Ken Levine, David Isaacs	May 31, 1985 (Note: "Saturday's Heroes" was originally scheduled to air December 11, 1984, according to TV Guide. However, CBS pre-empted AfterMASH for its annual presentation of Frosty the Snowman.)	2W07
Attempts at weekend romances are interrupted when the Potters' car breaks down and Wainwright revokes passes for the psychiatric ward. Elsewhere, the Klinger baby is christened and named.
31	9	"Wet Feet"	Hy Averback	Dennis Koenig	Unaired (Note: The episode "Wet Feet" was set to air at 8:00 p.m. on May 31, 1985, immediately before the airing of "Saturday's Heroes". However, CBS instead showed a CBS News special, Tax Reform: Other Views, in that time slot, as announced on the CBS Evening News that day.)	2W08
A Missouri thunderstorm leads Alma to practice her role as the hospital Civil Defense officer, the doctors to take refuge at a supply room poker game, and a mental patient to lock himself in the hospital fallout shelter after mistaking the storm for a nuclear attack.
