= Tamara Wilcox =

American actress (1940-1998)

Tamara Wilcox [also known as "Tamara Horrocks" and "Tamara Wilcox-Smith"] (March 4, 1940 – January 30, 1998) was a costume designer, actress, and theatrical producer and director.

She was born in Soda Springs, Idaho, and adopted by William H. and Dora Mickelson Wilcox. She married Leland R. Horrocks on June 8, 1958. In 1962, she received her B.A. degree from Northwestern University. Her marriage ended in 1965. She had one son, Sean Leland.

Beginning in 1965, she worked as a theatrical costume designer in San Francisco, Los Angeles, and New York City. She would later perform with the Committee Theatre on tour. In 1976 she founded the improvisational theatre group Interplay, and later the similar groups Play by Play and the National Improvisational Theatre.

In the early 1980s, she was recognized as the best director by the National Academy of Concert and Cabaret Artists for her work with Interplay. A feature on that group on the MacNeil/Lehrer News Hour was also nominated for a Peabody Award. In 1980, she collaborated with John Phillips, former leader of the rock group The Mamas & the Papas, on a screenplay titled Sweet Believer, a story about Cass Elliott who died of heart failure in 1974.

Her acting credits include portraying Capt. Bridget "Knocko" McCarthy in Robert Altman's original 1970 film version of M.A.S.H., and appearing in 1977's Andy Warhol's Bad and 1994's Pontiac Moon.

== Works ==
- M.A.S.H., "Capt. Bridget 'Knocko' McCarthy", 1970.
- Disco (screenplay), broadcast by NBC in 1976.
- Andy Warhol's Bad, "Angry Mother", 1977.
- Cats, Bats, and Sacred Cows, Contemporary Perspectives, 1977.
- Mysterious Detectives: The Psychics, Contemporary Perspectives, 1977.
- (with Ed Love) Dance for Me, produced 1980.
- Whattashow!, produced 1983.
- Pontiac Moon, "Buffalo Bar Singer", 1994.
