= Peter Michael Goetz =

American actor (born 1941)

- Born: December 10, 1941 (age 83); Buffalo, New York, U.S.
- Education: University of Minnesota
- Occupation: Actor
- Years active: 1980–2019
- Spouse: Constance Fleurat (m. 1966)
- Children: 2

Peter Michael Goetz (born December 10, 1941) is an American actor.

== Early life and education ==
Goetz was born in Buffalo, New York, the son of Esther L. and Irving A. Goetz, a construction engineer. Goetz studied at the State University of New York at Fredonia, Southern Illinois University Carbondale, and the University of Minnesota, from which he graduated.

== Career ==
After college, Goetz joined the Guthrie Theater in Minneapolis, where over the course of 40 years he has appeared in numerous productions, including Death of a Salesman, All My Sons, A Moon for the Misbegotten, The National Health, An Enemy of the People, Cat on a Hot Tin Roof, The Matchmaker, Arsenic and Old Lace, Waiting for Godot, A Midsummer Night's Dream, and The Taming of the Shrew.

Goetz made his Broadway debut as John Barrymore in the 1981 Colleen Dewhurst-directed play Ned and Jack, which closed on opening night. Additional New York City theatre credits include Beyond Therapy, Brighton Beach Memoirs, The Government Inspector, The Last Night of Ballyhoo, Macbeth, and the off-Broadway productions The Jail Diary of Albie Sachs and Alan Ayckbourn's Comic Potential.

Feature films in which Goetz has appeared include Wolfen, Prince of the City, The World According to Garp, Jumpin' Jack Flash, King Kong Lives, Father of the Bride, Dad, Glory, My Girl, and The Empty Mirror. His television credits include AfterMASH, Lou Grant, St. Elsewhere, The Facts of Life, Simon & Simon, Matlock, The Golden Girls, L.A. Law, The Cavanaughs, Twin Peaks, Picket Fences, Touched by an Angel, The Practice, The West Wing, Gilmore Girls, Without a Trace, Arrested Development, in addition to numerous television films and mini-series.

== Personal life ==
Goetz married Constance Fleurat in 1966. They have two sons.

== Filmography ==
=== Film ===
| Year | Title | Role | Notes |
|---|---|---|---|
| 1981 | Wolfen | Ross | |
| 1981 | Prince of the City | U.S. Attorney Charles Deluth | |
| 1982 | The World According to Garp | John Wolfe | |
| 1984 | Best Defense | Frank Joyner | |
| 1984 | C.H.U.D. | Gramps | |
| 1985 | Beer | Harley Feemer | |
| 1986 | My Little Girl | Norman Bettinger | |
| 1986 | Jumpin' Jack Flash | Mr. Page | |
| 1986 | King Kong Lives | Dr. Andrew Ingersoll | |
| 1989 | Dad | Dr. Ethridge | |
| 1989 | Glory | Francis George Shaw | |
| 1991 | Another You | Therapist | |
| 1991 | My Girl | Dr. Welty | |
| 1991 | Father of the Bride | John MacKenzie | |
| 1995 | Above Suspicion | Judge | |
| 1995 | Father of the Bride Part II | John MacKenzie | |
| 1996 | Infinity | Dr. Gell-Mann | |
| 1996 | The Empty Mirror | Sigmund Freud | |
| 1998 | My Engagement Party | Robert Salsburg | |
| 1999 | Valerie Flake | Douglas Flake | |
| 2000 | The View from the Swing | Dr. Mullins | |
| 2013 | Scenic Route | Old Man in Car | |
| 2015 | Martyrs | Professor | Uncredited |
| 2019 | A Violent Separation | Riley Jenkins | |

=== Television ===
| Year | Title | Role | Notes |
|---|---|---|---|
| 1980 | Act of Love | Dr. Warren Fitzpatrick | Television film |
| 1981 | Another World | Dr. Feldman | Episode #1.4336 |
| 1982 | One of the Boys | George Shields | 2 episodes |
| 1982 | Lou Grant | Bob O'Brien | Episode: "Obituary" |
| 1982 | The Phoenix | Professor | Episode: "One of Them" |
| 1983 | An Invasion of Privacy | Gerald Deims | Television film |
| 1983 | Star Wars | Admiral Ozzel | 2 episodes |
| 1983 | St. Elsewhere | Dr. Larry Andrews | Episode: The Count" |
| 1983 | The Edge of Night | Harry Lavender | 9 episodes |
| 1984 | All Together Now | Walt Parker | Television film |
| 1984–1985 | AfterMASH | Wally Wainright | 9 episodes |
| 1985 | Braker | Captain Joyce | Television film |
| 1985 | The Facts of Life | Fred Burnett | Episode: "A New Life" |
| 1986 | The Twilight Zone | American Ambassador Fraser | Episode: "A Small Talent for War" |
| 1986 | Simon & Simon | Michael Fielding | Episode: "Eye of the Beholder" |
| 1986 | Promise | Stuart | Television film |
| 1986–1989 | The Cavanaughs | Chuck Cavanaugh | 26 episodes |
| 1987 | The Bronx Zoo | Dr. Messina | Episode: "Signs of Life" |
| 1987 | Spenser: For Hire | Peter Dorian | Episode: "Consilum Abditum" |
| 1988 | A Father's Homecoming | Housemaster Chapin | Television film |
| 1988 | Maybe Baby | Mayor Vincent Maneri | Television film |
| 1988 | A Stoning in Fulham County | Keller | Television film |
| 1989 | The Karen Carpenter Story | Harold Carpenter | Television film |
| 1989 | Midnight Caller | Stanton Durose | Episode: "But Not for Me" |
| 1989 | The Outside Woman | Madison | Television film |
| 1989 | What's Alan Watching? | Leo Hofstetter | Unsold pilot |
| 1989 | I Know My First Name Is Steven | Pat Hallford | 2 episodes |
| 1989 | Mancuso, F.B.I. | Dr. Silvan Kaufman | Episode: "Weapons-Grade" |
| 1989 | Matlock | Steven Abbot | Episode: "The Scrooge" |
| 1990 | The Golden Girls | Dr. Stein | Episode: "Like the Beep Beep Beep of the Tom Tom" |
| 1990 | L.A. Law | Dr. Robert Woolf | Episode: "Whatever Happened to Hannah?" |
| 1990 | Twin Peaks | Jared Lancaster | 3 episodes |
| 1990 | Gabriel's Fire | Petroni | 2 episodes |
| 1990 | Fine Things | Bergosian | Television film |
| 1991 | Tagget | Alex Howell | Television film |
| 1991 | Stat | Ira | Episode: "Safe Smuggling" |
| 1992 | The Water Engine | Soapbox Speaker One | Television film |
| 1992–1993 | Room for Two | Ken Kazurinsky | 26 episodes |
| 1993 | Picket Fences | Dr. Haber | Episode: "Cross Examination" |
| 1993 | The Day My Parents Ran Away | Waldo | Television film |
| 1994 | The Boys Are Back | Ron Ginrich | Episode: "Mikey at Nike" |
| 1995 | The Buccaneers | Colonel St. George | 4 episodes |
| 1995 | My Brother's Keeper | Tabor | Television film |
| 1996 | Sisters | Elton Grenthal | Episode: "The Best Man" |
| 1996 | The Faculty | Principal Herbert Adams | 13 episodes |
| 1996 | The Pretender | Dr. Miles Hendricks | Episode: "Pilot" |
| 1996 | Touched by an Angel | Jordan Du Bois | Episode: "The Violin Lesson" |
| 1997 | Ellen | Dr. Haddassi | Episode: "Makin' Whoopie" |
| 1997 | 413 Hope St. | David L. Forrest | Episode: "Redemption" |
| 1997 | Fame L.A. | Mr. Hicks | Episode: "The Guru" |
| 1999 | Home Improvement | Dr. Hanover | 2 episodes |
| 2000 | Family Law | Mr. Yarborough | Episode: "A Mother's Son" |
| 2000 | Chicken Soup for the Soul | 2000 | Episode: "Letters to Suzie" |
| 2000–2001 | The Practice | Dr. Dennis Murphy | 3 episodes |
| 2001 | The West Wing | Paul Hackett | Episode: "18th and Potomac" |
| 2001 | That's Life | Ron Winters | Episode: "M.Y.O.B." |
| 2001, 2003 | Gilmore Girls | Straub Hayden | 2 episodes |
| 2003 | Without a Trace | Mr. Mandel | Episode: "A Tree Falls" |
| 2006 | Arrested Development | Dr. Farmer | Episode: "Fakin' It" |
| 2006 | Where There's a Will | Donnie Paul Lugger | Television film |
| 2006 | Psych | Griffin Mahoney | Episode: "Weekend Warriors" |
| 2009 | Mending Fences | Doc Beatty | Television film |
| 2016 | Rush Hour | Rooney | Episode: "O Hostage! My Hostage!" |
