= Ingo Preminger =

American film producer

- Born: Ingwald Preminger; February 25, 1911; Czernowitz, Austria-Hungary (now Chernivtsi, Ukraine)
- Died: June 7, 2006 (aged 95); Pacific Palisades, California, U.S.
- Occupations: Film producer, literary agent
- Spouse: Katharina Musil (m. 1936)
- Children: 3

Ingwald "Ingo" Preminger (25 February 1911 – 7 June 2006) was a film producer. He was also the literary agent for several writers, including Dalton Trumbo and Ring Lardner Jr., both of whom were blacklisted in the McCarthy era. He was the brother of actor-director-producer Otto Preminger.

== Biography ==
Preminger was born to a Jewish family and studied law and worked as a lawyer in Vienna before emigrating to the United States due to the rise of Nazism. He was nominated for an Academy Award for the 1970 film M*A*S*H, the book of which had been sent to him by Lardner, and also produced The Salzburg Connection in 1972. He was survived by his wife of 70 years, Kate, and three children.
