= Barbara Townsend =

American film and television actress

- Born: August 4, 1913; Oakland, California, U.S.
- Died: January 29, 2002 (aged 88); Arlington, Virginia, U.S.
- Occupation: actress
- Years active: 1949–1993

Barbara Townsend (August 4, 1913 – January 29, 2002) was an American film and television actress. She is perhaps best known for her role as Mildred Potter in the series AfterMASH. Her film roles include One Good Cop, Hard to Kill and Annihilator.

== TV credits ==
- Murder, She Wrote (1993) (Season 10 Episode 3: "The Legacy of Borbey House") as Mrs. Higgins
- Murder, She Wrote (1989) (Season 5 Episode 9: "Something Borrowed, Someone Blue") as Clara
- Northern Exposure (1993) (Season 4 Episode 14: "Grosse Pointe, 48230") as Elizabeth Stowe (Grammy)
- Civil Wars (1992) (Season 2 Episode 3: "Oboe Phobia") as Enid Gough
- Quantum Leap (1991) (Season 4 Episode 3: "Hurricane - August 17, 1969") as Ma Maw
- Mama's Family (1990) (Season 6 Episode 19: "There is Nothing Like the Dames") as Dame Barth
- Hunter (1987) (Season 3 Episode 17: "Any Second Now") as Mrs. Karnovsky
- St. Elsewhere (1987) (Season 5 Episode 14: "Visiting Daze") as Anita Klein
- Mr. Belvedere (1986) (Season 3 Episode 2: "Grandma") as Eunice Townsend
- Highway to Heaven (1985) (Season 2 Episode 11: "The Monster: Part 2") as Ella McCulloch
- Highway to Heaven (1985) (Season 2 Episode 10: "The Monster: Part 1") as Ella McCulloch
- Knight Rider (1985) (Season 4 Episode 4: "Sky Knight") as Mrs. Swanson
- Remington Steele (1984) (Season 3 Episode 11: "Let's Steele a Plot") as Maxine Delano
- Little House on the Prairie (1983) (Season 9 Episode 21: "May I Have This Dance?") as Mrs. Mae Flannery
- The Streets of San Francisco (1977) (Season 5 Episode 12: "Monkey is Back") as Apartment Manager
- Highway Patrol (1957) (Season 3 Episode 8: "Hot Dust") as Landlady
- Alfred Hitchcock Presents (1957) (Season 3 Episode 2: "Mail Order Prophet") as Secretary
