= Clete Roberts =

American journalist (1912–1984)

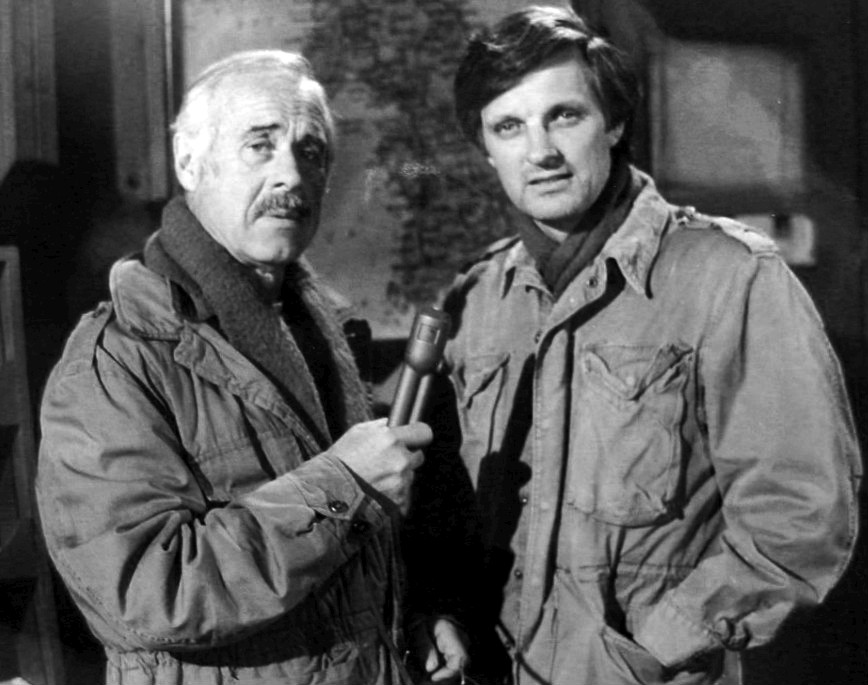
- From the TV series M*A*S*H: Roberts and Alan Alda (1976)
- Born: February 1, 1912; Portland, Oregon, U.S.
- Died: September 30, 1984 (aged 72); Los Angeles, California, U.S.
- Occupations: Journalist; anchor
- Years active: 1955–1984
- Notable credits: KNXT; KTLA; KCET

Clete Roberts (February 1, 1912 – September 30, 1984) was an American broadcast journalist. He began his career in radio news, then transitioned to television, working for stations in California. In later years, he portrayed himself and fictional broadcast journalists in entertainment media, such as in 1970s episodes of the TV series M*A*S*H.

== Career ==
=== KNXT Channel 2 ===
After serving as a war correspondent in World War II and Korea, Roberts settled in the Los Angeles area and became a respected radio news reporter, eventually turning to television in the mid-1950s at KNXT Channel 2 (now KCBS-TV), the local CBS owned-and-operated station. He anchored a nightly newscast and occasionally ventured to far-flung locations to report on national and international stories, taking with him his own Bell and Howell movie camera with which he shot his own news footage.

With him on KNXT's newscasts in that time were three other Los Angeles television stalwarts, anchor and reporter Bill Stout, weather forecaster Bill Keene and sports reporter Gil Stratton (who at the time also doubled as a radio, television and movie actor).

=== KTLA Channel 5 ===
Roberts left KNXT in 1959 and joined Los Angeles station KTLA Channel 5 as news director and primary anchor, along with news producer/director Julian Macdonald, virtually remaking that independent station's news operation. The newscast Roberts and Macdonald oversaw included such figures as Stout (who followed Roberts to KTLA in 1960), sports reporter and former football star Tom Harmon, and veteran reporter Stan Chambers.

=== "The Big News" ===
In 1966, Roberts returned to KNXT, joining the station's highly esteemed 6 p.m. The Big News broadcast and its late-night companion The Eleven O'Clock Report. Roberts joined a staff that included anchor Jerry Dunphy, Ralph Story, Keene, and Stratton. Roberts contributed news and feature reports and anchored the weekend newscasts. Early in 1974 he once again left KNXT for KTLA and took over the station's hour-long 10 p.m. newscasts. After two years Roberts decided to step back from nightly television news and left KTLA; after a hiatus he joined PBS member television station KCET, contributing feature reports and commentaries. His long tenure in Los Angeles included reports and travels ranging from offbeat local stories to the Vietnam War. In December 1969, Roberts assisted a colleague in notifying the Los Angeles Police Department that they had been in possession for months of the gun that was used in the Tate–LaBianca murders.

=== Acting career ===
Roberts appeared in episodes of M*A*S*H, in which he played himself, as a war correspondent.

Roberts appeared as himself in the lengthy introduction to the crime syndicate expose film The Phenix City Story in 1955. He interviewed on camera several of the actual townspeople of Phenix City, Alabama, who had been witness to the events there in the 1930s, '40s and early '50s.

Roberts portrayed reporters in various productions, among them Meteor from 1979 and the 1983 NBC miniseries V as well a San Francisco television newsman in the 1983 nuclear war film Testament. He is credited as a narrator in the 1983 television film Blood Feud.

== Death ==
Roberts died at age 72 of heart and respiratory failure at 6:55 a.m. PT on September 30, 1984. He had been admitted to Cedars-Sinai Medical Center 44 days earlier on August 17 for surgery necessitated by a brain aneurysm. He suffered a fatal heart attack when the aneurysm pressed on his respiratory nerve and caused him to stop breathing.
