= Gary Burghoff =

American actor (born 1943)

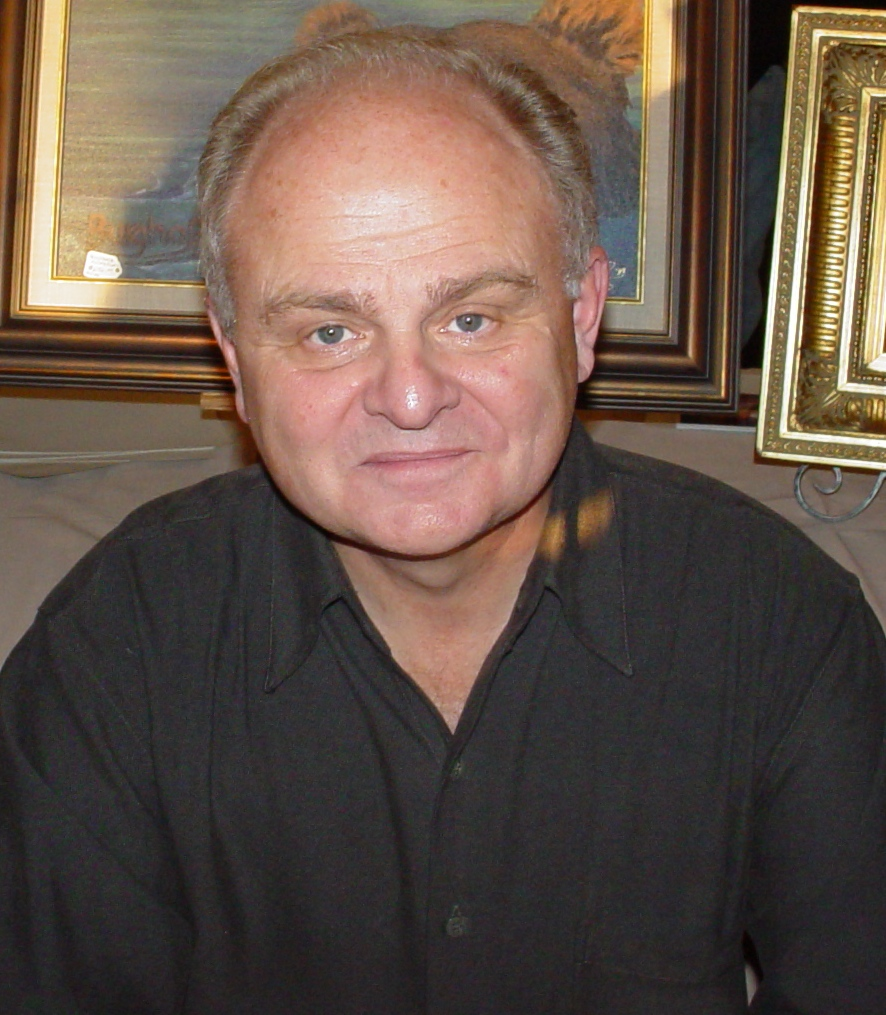
- Burghoff at a convention in 2003
- Born: Gary Rich Burghoff; May 24, 1943 (age 83); Bristol, Connecticut, U.S.
- Education: Delavan High School, Delavan, Wisconsin
- Occupation: Actor
- Years active: 1967–1995, 2010
- Spouses: Janet Gayle (m. 1971; div. 1979) Elisabeth Bostrom (m. 1985; div. 2005)
- Children: 3

Gary Rich Burghoff (born May 24, 1943) is an American actor who is known for first playing the role of Charlie Brown in the 1967 Off-Broadway musical You're a Good Man, Charlie Brown, and the character Corporal Walter Eugene "Radar" O'Reilly in the film M*A*S*H, as well as the TV series. He was a regular on television game show Match Game from 1974 to 1979 for 204 episodes, standing in for Charles Nelson Reilly, who was in New York doing a Broadway play, and continued to make recurring appearances afterwards.

== Early life ==
Burghoff was born in Bristol, Connecticut, moved to Clinton, Connecticut, and then later moved to Delavan, Wisconsin.

He was born with brachydactyly caused by Poland syndrome, which made three fingers on his left hand significantly smaller than those on his right hand. On M*A*S*H, Burghoff often held a clipboard or other prop to conceal his underdeveloped hand.

He studied tap dance and jazz drumming, and gained early experience acting with the Belfry Players of Williams Bay, Wisconsin. He received his acting training at HB Studio in New York City.

== Career ==
In 1967, Burghoff portrayed Charlie Brown in the original off-Broadway production of You're a Good Man, Charlie Brown.

He was the drummer for a band called The Relatives in 1968. Lynda Carter, later a well-known actress, was the band's singer. The group opened at the Sahara Hotel and Casino lounge in Las Vegas, Nevada, and played there for three months. He and Carter remained friends, and much later they appeared together in an episode of her hit series The New Adventures of Wonder Woman in the 1978 episode "The Man Who Wouldn't Tell".

=== M*A*S*H ===
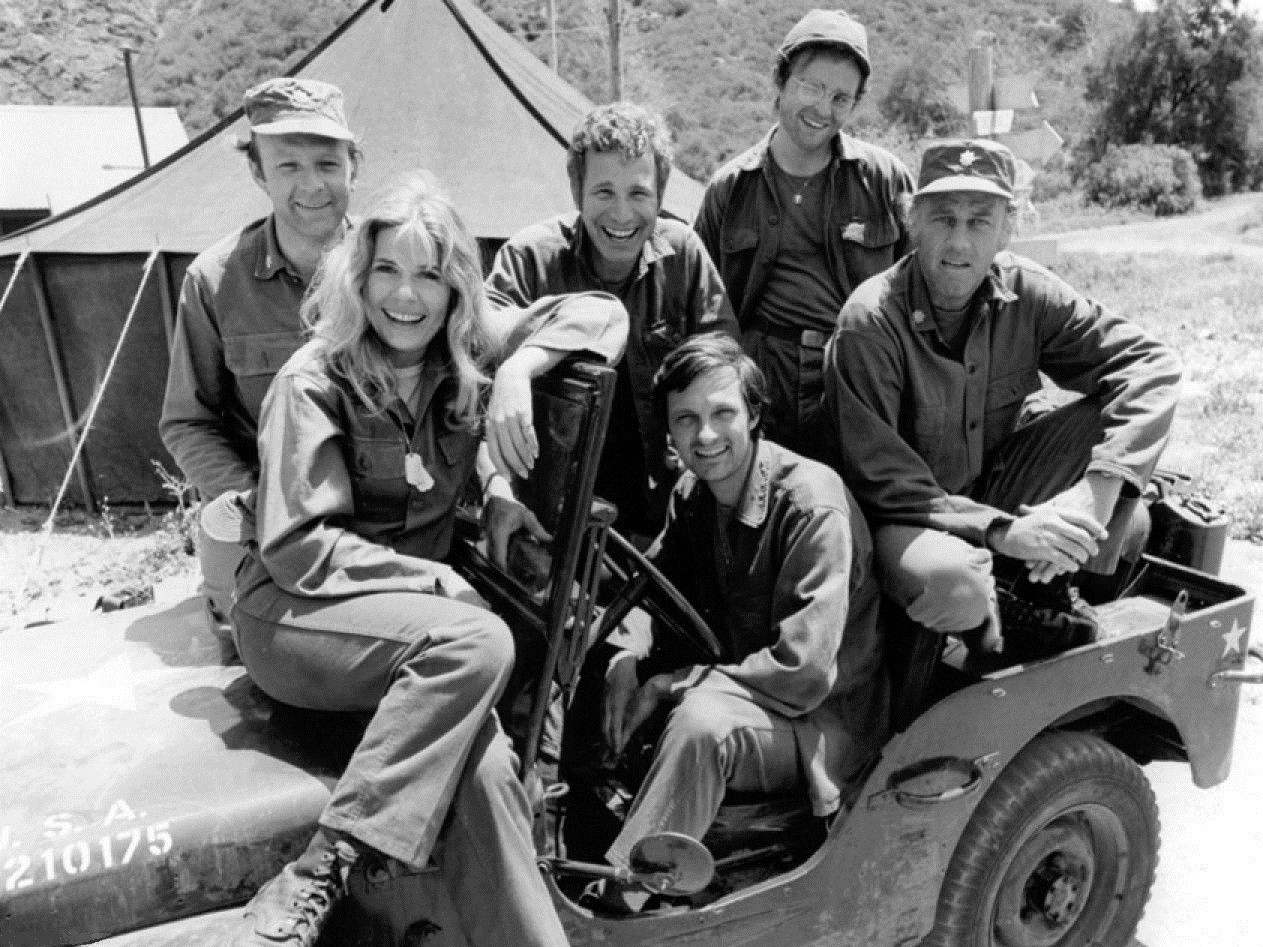
(L to R) Larry Linville, Loretta Swit, Wayne Rogers, Alan Alda, Gary Burghoff, and McLean Stevenson

Burghoff made his feature film debut in Robert Altman's M*A*S*H (1970). Although several actors from the original film made guest appearances in the television series M*A*S*H, Burghoff was the only actor to continue as a regular, in the role of Radar O'Reilly. Although he played the same character in the series as in the film, Burghoff has cited differences in the portrayal:

In the original feature film M*A*S*H, I created Radar as a lone, darker and somewhat sardonic character; kind of a shadowy figure. I continued these qualities for a short time until I realized that the TV M*A*S*H characters were developing in a different direction from the film characters. It became a group of sophisticated, highly educated doctors (and one head nurse) who would rather be anywhere else and who understood the nature of the "hellhole" they were stuck in. With [Larry] Gelbart's help, I began to mold Radar into a more innocent, naïve character as contrast to the other characters, so that while the others might deplore the immorality and shame of war (from an intellectual and judgmental viewpoint), Radar could just REACT from a position of total innocence.

Burghoff was nominated for six Emmy Awards for M*A*S*H in the category of Outstanding Supporting Actor in a Comedy Series and, of those nominations, he won an Emmy in 1977. Burghoff's co-star Alan Alda accepted the award on his behalf.

Burghoff left M*A*S*H in 1979 after the seventh season because of burnout and a desire to spend more time with his family, though he returned the following season to film a special two-part farewell episode, "Goodbye Radar". He explained, "Family, to me, became the most important thing. I was not available as a father because of my work. That doesn't stop when the work stops. Whenever you go out as a family, you're always torn from family to deal with public recognition." "Goodbye Radar" was supposed to be the final episode of season 7, but at the behest of CBS, it was extended into a double-episode for the November sweeps the next season. Fellow cast member Mike Farrell tried to persuade Burghoff to stay on the show, citing the lackluster careers of former M*A*S*H regulars Larry Linville and McLean Stevenson after their departures.

Farrell later said, "Gary Burghoff may well have been the best actor in the company, it's always seemed to me. His focus, his ability to find those little gems of behavior that made everything absolutely true were a marvel to behold."

=== Later career ===
Burghoff appeared regularly on TV, making appearances on such game shows as Match Game, Tattletales, Liar's Club, Hollywood Squares, and Showoffs. He also appeared in the film B.S. I Love You, as well as one episode each of The Love Boat and Ellery Queen. His M*A*S*H character, Radar O'Reilly, appeared on two episodes in the first season of AfterMASH. The character was then spun off into a pilot episode for the proposed series W*A*L*T*E*R, which aired in July, 1984.

In the 1980s, Burghoff was the TV spokesman for BP gasoline and IBM computers. In 2000, Burghoff was a spokesman for dot-com era auction aggregation site PriceRadar.com.

Burghoff is a self-taught amateur wildlife painter who also is qualified to handle injured wildlife in California.

He worked as a professional jazz drummer, heading the trio The We Three. In the M*A*S*H episode "Showtime", Radar is seen playing a solo on the drums; he was actually performing, and the music was not overdubbed. He can also be seen playing drums in the M*A*S*H episode "Bulletin Board" in the picnic scene and the episode "Dear Dad...Again" in the no-talent show scene.

Burghoff is the inventor (U.S. patent 5,117,577, U.S. patent 5,235,774) of "Chum Magic", a fishing tackle invention that attracts fish toward the user's boat. Other Burghoff inventions include a toilet seat lifting handle (U.S. patent D314322) and a new type of fishing pole.

Burghoff is a philatelist. He was asked in 1993 to help select a postal stamp for United States hunters.

Burghoff came out of retirement in 2010 to star in the film Daniel's Lot.

== Personal life ==
Burghoff was married to Janet Gale from 1971 to 1979. They have one daughter.

In 1985, he married Elisabeth Bostrom. They have two sons; they divorced in 2005.

== Works ==
- Burghoff, G (2009). To M*A*S*H and Back: My Life in Poems and Songs. Albany: BearManor Media. ISBN 978-1-59393-343-2.

== Filmography ==
=== Film ===
Year	Title	Role	Notes
1970	M*A*S*H	Cpl. Walter "Radar" O'Reilly	
1971	B.S. I Love You	Ted Bufman	
1975	Twigs	Clergyman	TV movie
1979	The Man in the Santa Claus Suit	Bob Willis	TV movie
1980	Casino	Bill Taylor	TV movie
1991	Doubles	Arnie	
1992	Small Kill	Fleck / Lady Esmerelda	Also director
1995	Behind the Waterfall	Mr. Connors	
2010	Daniel's Lot	Pastor Mahoney	

=== Television ===
Year	Title	Role	Notes
1967	NET Playhouse	Boy	Episode: "An Evening Journey to Conway Massachusetts"
1969	The Good Guys	Mike Butterworth	Episode: "Take a Computer to Lunch"
1970	The Name of the Game	Watson	Episode: "Man of the People"
1972–1979	M*A*S*H	Cpl. Walter "Radar" O'Reilly	174 episodes (seasons 1-8)
1973	Love, American Style	Sydney Melvin Wimple / Wilbur Wright	Episodes: "Love and the Crisis Line", "Love and the Plane Fantasy"
1974–1975	Insight	Milo / Mombo	Episodes: "Five Without Faces", "The Incredible Man"
1974–1981	Match Game	Self	Episodes: 311-315, 331-335, 341-350, 356-365, 371-415, 417-470 (129 episodes, 1974-75). Recurring appearances afterwards from 1975 to 1981
1976	Ellery Queen	Gerald Hacker	Episode: "The Adventure of the Disappearing Dagger"
1977	The Love Boat	Donald M. Flanders	Episode: "The Captain's Captain/Romance Roulette/Hounded (A Dog's Life)"
1978	America 2-Night	Himself	Episode: "Help Every Little Person"
1978	Fantasy Island	Richard C. Delaney	Episode: "Superstar/Salem"
1978	The New Adventures of Wonder Woman	Alan	Episode: "The Man Who Wouldn't Tell"
1979	$weepstake$	Roscoe Fuller	Episode: "Roscoe, Elizabeth, and the M.C."
1980	Fantasy Island	Gordon Hughes	Episode: "The Love Doctor/Pleasure Palace/Possessed"
1981	The Love Boat	Eddie Martin	Episode: "Maid for Each Other/Lost and Found/Then There Were Two"
1981	Tales of the Unexpected	Harry Flock	Episode: "The Best Policy"
1984	AfterMASH	Walter "Radar" O'Reilly	Episodes: "Yours Truly, Max Klinger", "It Had to Be You"
1984	W*A*L*T*E*R	Walter "Radar" O'Reilly	Unsold pilot
1984	Carnival of the Animals	himself/host	TV special featuring music of Camille Saint-Saëns
1995	Burke's Law	Patrick Noyes	Episode: "Who Killed the Hollywood Headshrinker?"
