= MASH: A Novel About Three Army Doctors =

1968 book about fictional MASH unit 4077 by Richard Hooker

- Cover to paperback edition (Pocket Books, 1969)
- Author: Richard Hooker
- Language: English
- Series: M*A*S*H
- Genre: War, comedy, drama
- Publisher: William Morrow
- Publication date: 1968
- Publication place: United States
- Media type: Print (hardcover and paperback)
- Pages: 211 pp
- ISBN: 978-0-688-02061-3
- LC Class: PS3558.O55
- Followed by: M*A*S*H Goes to Maine

MASH: A Novel About Three Army Doctors is a 1968 novel written by Richard Hooker (the pen name of former military surgeon H. Richard Hornberger) with the assistance of writer W. C. Heinz. It is notable as the foundation of the M*A*S*H franchise, which includes a 1970 feature film and a long-running TV series (1972–1983). The novel is about a fictional U.S. Mobile Army Surgical Hospital in South Korea during the Korean War.

Hooker followed the novel with two sequels. Additionally, a series of sequels, of a different and lighter tone, were credited to Hooker and William E. Butterworth, but actually written by Butterworth alone.

== Background ==
Hornberger was born in 1924 and raised in Trenton, New Jersey. He attended Bowdoin College in Brunswick, Maine. After graduating from Cornell University Medical School, he was drafted into the Korean War and assigned to the 8055 Mobile Army Surgical Hospital (M.A.S.H. or MASH).

M.A.S.H. units, according to one doctor assigned to the unit, "weren't on the front lines, but they were close. They lived and worked in tents. It was hot in the summer and colder than cold in the winter." The operating room consisted of stretchers balanced on carpenters' sawhorses.

Many of the M.A.S.H. doctors were in their 20s, many with little advanced surgical training. During battle campaigns, units could see "as many as 1,000 casualties a day".

"What characterized the fighting in Korea", one of Hornberger's fellow officers recalled, "was that you would have a period of a week or 10 days when nothing much was happening, then there would be a push. When you had a push, there would suddenly be a mass of casualties that would just overwhelm us."

There were, another surgeon recalled, "'long periods when not much of anything happened' in an atmosphere of apparent safety—plenty of time to play ... When things were quiet we would sit around and read. Sometimes the nurses would have a little dance."

A colleague described Hornberger as "a very good surgeon with a tremendous sense of humor." As in the novel, Hornberger did label his tent "The Swamp". Hornberger was not fond of the TV adaptation of his novel, as he was politically conservative, in contrast to the tone of the show.

Hornberger's later assessment of his unit's behavior was: "A few flipped their lids, but most just raised hell in a variety of ways and degrees."

After the war ended, Hornberger worked in a VA hospital before returning to Maine to establish a surgical practice in Waterville. In 1956, he began attempting to put his memories into a book.

In the 1960s, a visit with a former M.A.S.H. colleague and his wife—a nurse at the unit—led to a session of drinking and storytelling. Hornberger later claimed the evening gave him new motivation to finish his manuscript.

A chance event brought Hornberger and Heinz together. "A doctor named J. Maxwell Chamberlain helped me write my novel The Surgeon and, previous to that, a Life cover piece about a lung operation," Heinz told American Heritage magazine. Hornberger, who had studied under Chamberlain, sent Heinz a letter suggesting that they collaborate. After Heinz's wife read the manuscript and enjoyed it, he agreed to contribute: "I cleaned it up, since it was full of those jokes that doctors like to make about the body. Then it took quite a while, maybe a year, back and forth. I eventually tied everything together. As much as it got tied together; there isn't a hell of a story line in MASH, just a succession of operations and techniques and humor. The only thing that holds it together is the characters and the familiarity that the reader comes to have with them."

== Plot ==
Lieutenant Colonel Henry Blake, commander of the 4077th Mobile Army Surgical Hospital, requests two new surgeons for his unit. Captains Duke Forrest and Hawkeye Pierce share a jeep to the post, in the process discovering that they share a taste for alcohol and similar views about many issues. Blake assigns them to the night shift, billeting them with Major Jonathan Hobson, a Midwestern preacher and surgeon.

Despite their dislike of authority and penchant for making wisecracks and pulling pranks, the new doctors exhibit exceptional surgical skills and commitment to their job, gaining the respect of their colleagues. They become annoyed by Maj. Hobson's religious fervor and insist that Blake have Maj. Hobson rebilleted. Friction mounts between the major and the new captains; when Major Hobson's prayers begin to annoy everyone, Col. Blake arranges to have him sent stateside.

Pierce and Forrest request a chest surgeon for the unit. When the new man, Captain John McIntyre, arrives, he displays exceptional skill, but resists their attempts to draw him into their social circle. During a recreational football game, Hawkeye suddenly remembers playing football against McIntyre in college and introduces McIntyre to everyone as Trapper John.

The Bachelor Officers Quarters (BOQ) tent occupied by the three surgeons, known as The Swamp, becomes a central gathering point. The surgeons enjoy the company of Father Mulcahy, the Catholic chaplain, although they are not strongly religious, but Duke (an avowed Protestant) wants to seek out a Protestant chaplain. A chaplain is found, but the "Swampmen" object to his habit of ghostwriting cheerful letters for soldiers without checking the seriousness of their wounds. After a patient dies the day after a letter saying "Everything is fine and I'll be home soon" is sent, the Swampmen lash him to a wooden cross and make him believe they intend to burn him alive.

Captain Waldowski, a dentist nicknamed "The Painless Pole", is prone to regular fits of depression. When he announces his decision to commit suicide, the Swampmen stage a "Last Supper", summon everyone to bid him farewell and then give him a sedative. While he is sedated, they hook him to a harness and drop him from a helicopter, ending the depression.

The Swampmen have frequent conflicts with Captain Frank Burns. Burns, even though he has never had surgical training, nonetheless considers his work to be infallible, and holds himself above the Swampmen. After one of his patients dies, he angrily blames an orderly. First Duke and then Trapper get into a fistfight with Burns.

When the new Chief Nurse, Major Margaret Houlihan arrives, she considers the well-groomed and courtly Burns to be the superior doctor. After Henry Blake names Trapper John as his Chief Surgeon (based on demonstrated ability), Burns and Houlihan get drunk and stay late in her tent, preparing a highly negative report for Gen. Hammond. The next day the Swampmen tease Burns and Houlihan. Trapper John calls Houlihan "Hot Lips"; Hawkeye provokes Burns into a fight. Henry is finally forced to send Burns stateside.

Ho-Jon, the Korean houseboy working in the Swamp, is drafted into the South Korean army. After being wounded, he arrives at the 4077th for treatment. After rehabilitation, he resumes his position as Swampboy and the Swampmen decide to send him to Hawkeye's old college. To raise funds, Trapper poses as Jesus Christ, selling autographed photos and making personal appearances.

A U.S. Congressman whose son is wounded in combat demands that Trapper and Hawkeye fly to Japan to perform an "emergency surgery." The surgery proves to be routine and the doctors spend much of the recovery period playing golf. Hawkeye reconnects with a friend, "Me Lay" Marston, who serves as an anaesthetist for the Army but also helps a local doctor run a combination pediatric hospital and whorehouse. Me Lay asks the boys to look at a sick baby, who does require emergency surgery. Hawkeye and Trapper blackmail the hospital's commanding officer into permitting the operation and talk Me Lay into adopting the orphan baby.

Trapper and Hawkeye return to find the 4077th overwhelmed by casualties. A continuous flow of wounded pours into the hospital for two weeks. All personnel work around the clock performing operations. Everyone becomes exhausted and irritable; the Swampmen begin harassing Maj. Houlihan. She complains to Gen. Hammond, who begins an investigation of Col. Blake's conduct. The Swampmen intercede, smoothing matters over with the General.

Summer arrives and Col. Blake is sent to Tokyo for three weeks; Colonel DeLong fills in. Col. DeLong is unfamiliar with the type of high-volume, high-speed surgery used at the 4077th; after an angry confrontation with Hawkeye, DeLong gains respect for the work. Eventually the Swampmen get bored and decide to convince DeLong they need psychiatric evaluation. When he sends them to a diagnostic unit, they escape custody and visit a brothel.

General Hammond's unit has a football team. Because he has stocked it with professional players who were drafted, he makes a tidy profit playing other units and betting on the results. The Swampmen organize their own team and tell Col. Blake to ask Hammond to assign neurosurgeon Oliver Wendell Jones to the 4077. Jones, unbeknownst to Hammond, is a former football star nicknamed Spearchucker.

In the game, the Swampmen incapacitate one of Hammond's pros by injecting him with a sedative during a pileup. They use Corporal Radar O'Reilly's ESP abilities to detect upcoming plays and employ a trick play to win the game 28-24 and make an enormous profit.

As Duke and Hawkeye wait for their deployments to expire, they become bored. To keep them busy, Henry Blake has them teach two new doctors their short-cuts. One learns capably, but the other needs to be sent home. On the journey back from Korea, they feign battle fatigue to get favorable treatment and impersonate chaplains to avoid work. They say goodbye when they reach the US; each rejoins his family.

== Characters ==
- Corporal "Radar" O'Reilly – from Ottumwa, Iowa, given his nickname for his extremely acute hearing and apparent extra-sensory perception, inspired by real-life company clerk Don Shafer who served alongside Hornberger in Korea
- Brigadier General Hamilton Hartington Hammond – stationed in Seoul
- Lieutenant Colonel Henry Braymore Blake – Commanding Officer, florid, balding, stutters when angry, from Illinois
- Captain Walter Koskiusko "The Painless Pole" Waldowski – from Hamtramck, Michigan, Dental Officer
- Captain Augustus Bedford "Duke" Forrest – from Forrest City, Georgia, age 29, under 6 feet tall, red hair, blue eyes, married with two daughters
- Captain Benjamin Franklin "Hawkeye" Pierce Jr. – from Crabapple Cove, Maine, age 28, over 6 feet tall, brown-blond hair, wears glasses, married with two sons, six brothers
- Major Jonathan Hobson – age 35, general practitioner from the Midwest, committed Protestant preacher, extremely unskilled as a surgeon
- Captain "Trapper" John Francis Xavier McIntyre – from Boston, Massachusetts, Chief Surgeon, very skilled at thoracic surgery
- Captain "Ugly" John Black – Australian Army, chief anesthesiologist, limpid-eyed, dark-haired, handsome
- Father John Patrick "Dago Red" Mulcahy – from San Diego, California, Catholic chaplain, red hair
- "Shaking" Sammy – Protestant chaplain from nearby engineering unit, loves to shake hands, tends to send letters to the families of fatally wounded soldiers saying all is well
- Sergeant "Mother Divine" – from Brooklyn, New York, mess tent cook, sells fake deeds to public landmarks to gullible soldiers
- Captain Frank Burns – from Fort Wayne, Indiana, born to affluence, accustomed to authority, adept at cardiac massage, but inept at everything else
- Private Lorenzo Boone – age 19, bumbling medical assistant
- Major Margaret "Hot Lips" Houlihan – Chief Nurse, Regular Army, blondish, fortyish
- Ho-Jon – from Seoul, age 17, houseboy and medical assistant, tall, thin, bright, Christian
- Dr. James Lodge – from Crabapple Cove, Maine, Dean of Androscoggin College
- Benjamin Franklin "Big Benjy" Pierce, Sr. – from Crabapple Cove, Maine, lobster fisherman, Hawkeye's father
- Colonel Ruxton P. Merrill – Commanding Officer, 25th Station Hospital, Kokura, Japan, an unimaginative martinet
- Captain Ezekiel Bradbury "Me Lay" Marston IV – from Spruce Harbor, Maine, anesthesiologist, Hawkeye's childhood friend
- Colonel Cornwall – British officer
- Captain Bridget "Knocko" McCarthy – nurse from Boston, Massachusetts, age 35, 5'8"
- Sergeant Pete Rizzo – medical assistant, athletic
- Dr. R. C. "Jeeter" Carroll – from Oklahoma, surgeon, not very intelligent, 5'8", 150 lbs.
- Roger "the Dodger" Danforth – surgeon, 6073rd MASH, trained with Ugly John
- Colonel Horace DeLong – visiting officer, surgeon
- Lieutenant Rafael Rodriguez – medic, Colonel Blake's secretary
- Major Haskell – Chief of Psychiatry, 325th Evac
- Sergeant Vollmer – from Nebraska, Supply sergeant
- Captain Oliver Wendell "Spearchucker" Jones – from New Jersey, neurosurgeon, played football for the Philadelphia Eagles, also threw javelin as a track athlete
- Captain Emerson Pinkham – surgeon, Ivy League, book-smart but somewhat dense, has a wife who goes insane and is sent to an asylum
- Captain Leverett Russell – surgeon, Ivy League, book-smart but somewhat dense

== Copies ==
A typescript copy of MASH, with copyedit corrections and editor's annotations, is held in the Special Collections and Archives holdings of Bowdoin College, Hooker's alma mater. This is referred to in a tongue-in-cheek manner in Hooker's later work M*A*S*H Mania (1977) when it is stated that, "In addition to the original manuscript of MASH by Richard Hooker, the works of Mr. Longfellow, a nineteenth-century poet and writer, are on display in the fictitious Androscoggin College Library". (Androscoggin is the alma mater of Hawkeye Pierce.)
