= Richard Hooker (author) =

American writer and surgeon (1924–1997)

- Hooker at the original "Swamp" tent at the 8055th Mobile Army Surgical Hospital in South Korea during the Korean War.
- Born: Hiester Richard Hornberger Jr. February 1, 1924; Trenton, New Jersey, U.S.
- Died: November 4, 1997 (aged 73); Portland, Maine, U.S.
- Resting place: Hillside Cemetery, Bremen, Maine
- Other name: Richard Hooker
- Education: Peddie School
- Alma mater: Bowdoin College; Cornell Medical School
- Occupations: Author; Surgeon
- Known for: M*A*S*H
- Spouse: Priscilla Storer
- Children: 5
- Military career
- Allegiance: United States
- Branch: United States Army
- Unit: 8055th Mobile Army Surgical Hospital
- Conflicts: Korean War

Hiester Richard Hornberger Jr. (February 1, 1924 – November 4, 1997) was an American writer and surgeon who wrote under the pseudonym Richard Hooker. Hornberger's best-known work is his novel MASH (1968), based on his experiences as a wartime United States Army surgeon during the Korean War and written in collaboration with W. C. Heinz. It was used as the basis for the award-winning, critically and commercially successful movie M*A*S*H (1970) — and two years later, the acclaimed long running television series of the same title.

== Early life and education ==
Born in Trenton, New Jersey, Hornberger attended the Peddie School in Hightstown. He graduated from Bowdoin College in Brunswick, Maine, where he was an active member of the Beta Theta Pi fraternity. He went to Cornell Medical School in New York City.

== Military experience ==
After graduating from medical school, he was drafted into the Korean War and assigned to the 8055 Mobile Army Surgical Hospital (M.A.S.H.). According to one doctor assigned to the unit, M.A.S.H. units "weren't on the front lines, but they were close. They lived and worked in tents. It was hot in the summer and colder than cold in the winter." The operating room consisted of stretchers balanced on carpenter's sawhorses.

Many of the M.A.S.H. doctors were in their twenties, with few having advanced surgical training. During battle campaigns, units could see "as many as 1,000 casualties a day". "What characterized the fighting in Korea", one of Hornberger's fellow officers recalled, "was that you would have a period of a week or ten days when nothing much was happening, then there would be a push. When you had a push, there would suddenly be a mass of casualties that would just overwhelm us." There were, another surgeon recalled, "'long periods when not much of anything happened' in an atmosphere of apparent safety—plenty of time to play ... When things were quiet we would sit around and read. Sometimes the nurses would have a little dance." Hornberger's later assessment of his unit's behavior was: "A few flipped their lids, but most just raised hell in a variety of ways and degrees."

A colleague described Hornberger as "a very good surgeon with a tremendous sense of humor." Hornberger did label his tent "The Swamp" as do the characters in the novel.

== Private practice and writing career ==
After the war, Hornberger worked for the U.S. Veterans Administration, qualified for his surgical boards, and went into private practice in Waterville, Maine. Eventually, he settled into practice at Broad Cove in Bremen, Maine.

His experiences at the 8055th M.A.S.H. were the background for his novel MASH: A Novel About Three Army Doctors (1968), which he worked on for eleven years. In 1956, he began attempting to put his memories into a book. In the 1960s, a visit with a former M.A.S.H. colleague and his wife — a nurse at the unit — led to a session of drinking and storytelling. Hornberger later claimed the evening gave him new motivation to finish his manuscript.

MASH was rejected by many publishers. He worked with the famed sportswriter W.C. Heinz to revise it. A year later, the book was acquired by William Morrow and Company. Published under Hornberger's pseudonym, Richard Hooker, the novel was highly successful.

=== MASH adaptations ===
MASH was adapted as a film by the same name, directed by Robert Altman and released in 1970. It was nominated for five Academy Awards and won for Best Adapted Screenplay. According to writer John Baxter, Hornberger "was so furious at having sold the film rights for only a few hundred dollars that he never again signed a copy of the book."

A TV series was developed, that debuted in 1972 and ran for eleven seasons with great popularity. Hornberger reportedly did not like Alan Alda's portrayal of Captain "Hawkeye" Pierce in the TV series, favoring the Robert Altman film, in which Pierce was played by Donald Sutherland.

=== MASH sequels ===
Hornberger wrote the sequels to MASH — M*A*S*H Goes to Maine (1972) and M*A*S*H Mania (1977) — neither of which enjoyed the commercial success of the original. While MASH was a fairly faithful reflection of Hornberger's service in Korea, his sequels were diverse representations of the "Swamp Gang's" post-Korea activities in the fictional town of Spruce Harbor, Maine, from 1953 to the 1970s. Attempts to adapt M*A*S*H Goes to Maine into a film met with failure.

The sequels are characterized by gentle humour, stereotypical local characters, and a nostalgic look at Maine and its people through Hornberger's eyes. Throughout, the "Swamp Gang" prospers, gets its own way most of the time, and generally becomes more conservative as the years pass. The men play golf and are sometimes thorns in the side of "the summer complaints" (tourists) and local bigwigs.

A series of novels based on the franchise was published in between M*A*S*H Goes to Maine and M*A*S*H Mania in which the characters travel to various locations, including Moscow, New Orleans, San Francisco, and Paris. The books were credited to "Richard Hooker and William E. Butterworth", although they were written entirely by Butterworth. They were hastily written to capitalize on the TV show's popularity and were of dubious literary merit. The action was transposed to the 1970s so that people such as Henry Kissinger could be lampooned, but this would have made some of the characters quite old, if the descriptions in the first book were to be believed. For instance, Hot Lips would have been in her 60s, having been described as "fortyish" in the first novel.

== Later life and death ==
After the success of his book and its screen adaptations, Hornberger continued to practice as a surgeon in Waterville until his retirement in 1988. During the later years of his practice, Hornberger did medical research and published his research in peer-reviewed medical journals. He died at the age of 73 on November 4, 1997, of leukemia.

== Published works ==
1. MASH: A Novel About Three Army Doctors (1968)
2. M*A*S*H Goes to Maine (Feb 1972)
3. M*A*S*H Goes to New Orleans (with William E Butterworth) (Jan 1975)
4. M*A*S*H Goes to Paris (with William E Butterworth) (Jan 1975)
5. M*A*S*H Goes to London (with William E Butterworth) (June 1975)
6. M*A*S*H Goes to Morocco (with William E Butterworth) (Jan 1976)
7. M*A*S*H Goes to Las Vegas (with William E Butterworth) (Jan 1976)
8. M*A*S*H Goes to Hollywood (with William E Butterworth) (April 1976)
9. M*A*S*H Goes to Miami (with William E Butterworth) (Sep 1976)
10. M*A*S*H Goes to San Francisco (with William E Butterworth) (Nov 1976)
11. M*A*S*H Goes to Vienna (with William E Butterworth) (June 1976)
12. M*A*S*H Goes to Montreal (with William E Butterworth) (1977)
13. M*A*S*H Goes to Texas (with William E Butterworth) (Feb 1977)
14. M*A*S*H Goes to Moscow (with William E Butterworth) (Sep 1977)
15. M*A*S*H Mania (1977)
