= M*A*S*H (film) =

1970 film by Robert Altman

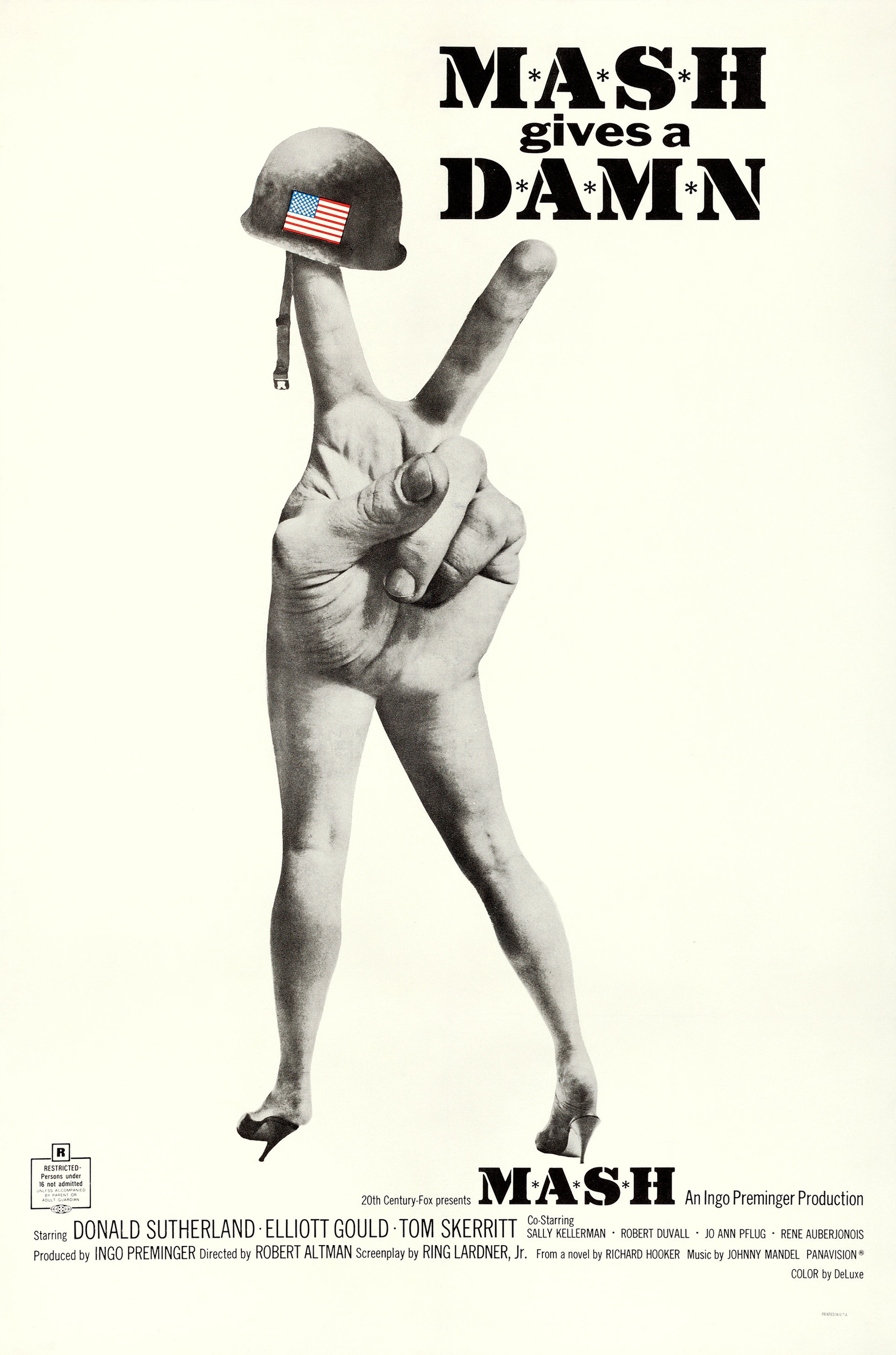
- Theatrical release poster
- Directed by: Robert Altman
- Screenplay by: Ring Lardner Jr.
- Based on: MASH: A Novel About Three Army Doctors; 1968 novel by Richard Hooker
- Produced by: Ingo Preminger
- Starring: Donald Sutherland; Elliott Gould; Tom Skerritt; Sally Kellerman; Robert Duvall; Roger Bowen; René Auberjonois; David Arkin; Jo Ann Pflug; Gary Burghoff; John Schuck; Michael Murphy; Fred Williamson
- Cinematography: Harold E. Stine
- Edited by: Danford B. Greene
- Music by: Johnny Mandel
- Production companies: Aspen Productions; Ingo Preminger Productions
- Distributed by: 20th Century Fox
- Release date: January 25, 1970 (United States)
- Running time: 116 minutes
- Country: United States
- Language: English
- Budget: $3 million
- Box office: $81.6 million

M*A*S*H is a 1970 American satirical black comedy war film directed by Robert Altman and written by Ring Lardner Jr., based on Richard Hooker's 1968 novel MASH: A Novel About Three Army Doctors.

The film depicts a unit of medical personnel stationed at a Mobile Army Surgical Hospital (MASH) during the Korean War. It stars Donald Sutherland, Tom Skerritt, and Elliott Gould, with Sally Kellerman, Robert Duvall, René Auberjonois, Gary Burghoff, Roger Bowen, Michael Murphy, and in his film debut, professional football player Fred Williamson. Although the Korean War is the film's storyline setting, the subtext is the Vietnam War – a current event at the time the film was made.

After having a panel screen the film, the Army and Air Force Motion Picture Service initially banned M*A*S*H from being shown at Army and Air Force base theaters because it "reflected unfavorably" on the armed services.

M*A*S*H became one of the biggest films of the early 1970s for 20th Century Fox. It won the Grand Prix du Festival International du Film, later named the Palme d'Or, at the 1970 Cannes Film Festival, received five Academy Award nominations, including Best Picture, and won for Best Adapted Screenplay. In 1996, M*A*S*H was selected for preservation in the National Film Registry by the Library of Congress being deemed "culturally, historically, or aesthetically significant". The Academy Film Archive preserved M*A*S*H in 2000.

The film inspired the television series of the same name, which ran from 1972 to 1983 on CBS. Gary Burghoff, who played Radar O'Reilly, was the only actor playing a major character who appeared in both the film and the television series. Altman despised the TV series, calling it "the antithesis of what we were trying to do" with the film.

== Plot ==
In 1951, the 4077th Mobile Army Surgical Hospital in South Korea is assigned two new surgeons, "Hawkeye" Pierce and "Duke" Forrest, who arrive in a stolen Jeep. They are insubordinate, womanizing, mischievous rule-breakers, but they prove to be excellent combat surgeons. Other characters include the bungling commanding officer Henry Blake, his hyper-competent chief clerk Radar O'Reilly, dentist Walter "Painless Pole" Waldowski, the pompous and incompetent surgeon Frank Burns, and the contemplative Chaplain Father Mulcahy.

Irritated by Frank's religious fervor, Hawkeye and Duke get Blake to move him to another tent so newly arrived chest surgeon Trapper John McIntyre can move in. The three draftee doctors (the "Swampmen", after the nickname for their tent) have little respect for military protocol, and pass time with pranks and heavy drinking. Frank, a straitlaced by-the-book military officer, bonds with Margaret Houlihan, the 4077th's head nurse and they develop a love affair. Radar and the Swampmen sneak a microphone into her tent and broadcast the pair's sexual encounter over the public address system, earning Houlihan the nickname "Hot Lips". The next morning, Hawkeye goads Frank into assaulting him, and Burns is removed for psychiatric evaluation. Later, when Houlihan is showering, the Swampmen pull the tent sides off and expose her, in order to settle a bet over whether she is a natural blonde. Houlihan confronts Blake for his weak leadership and threatens to resign her commission; Blake bluntly tells her she can do so.

Painless, described as "best-equipped dentist in the Army" and "the dental Don Juan of Detroit", fears an incident of impotence has turned him homosexual and he announces his intent to commit suicide. The Swampmen agree to help, stage a feast to evoke Leonardo da Vinci's Last Supper, arrange for Father Mulcahy to give absolution and communion, and provide him with a "black capsule" (actually a sleeping pill) to speed him on his way. Hawkeye persuades the gorgeous Lieutenant "Dish" Schneider – who has remained faithful to her husband and is being transferred back to the United States for discharge – to spend the night with Painless and allay his concern about his "latent homosexuality". The next morning, Painless is his usual cheerful self, and a smiling Dish departs for home in a helicopter.

Hawkeye and Trapper are ordered to Japan to operate on a Congressman's son, which they exploit as an opportunity to play golf. When they also perform an unauthorized operation on a local infant, they face disciplinary action from the hospital commander for misusing Army resources. Trapper uses anesthetic gas to sedate the commander. Using staged photographs of him as he awakens in bed with a prostitute, they blackmail him into keeping his mouth shut.

Blake and General Hammond organize a football game between the 4077th and the 325th Evac Hospital and heavily wager on the outcome. At Hawkeye's suggestion, Blake applies to have a specific neurosurgeon – Dr. Oliver Harmon "Spearchucker" Jones, a former professional football player for the San Francisco 49ers – transferred to the 4077th as a ringer. Hawkeye also suggests Blake bet half his money up front and keep Jones out of the first half of the game. The 325th scores repeatedly and easily, even after the 4077th drugs one of their star players to incapacitate him. Hammond confidently offers high odds, against which Blake bets the rest of his money. Jones enters the second half, which quickly devolves into a free-for-all, and the 4077th gets the 325th's second ringer thrown out of the game and wins with a final trick play.

Not long after the football game, Hawkeye and Duke get their discharge orders and begin their journey home – taking the same stolen Jeep in which they arrived.

== Cast ==
- Donald Sutherland as Captain Benjamin Franklin "Hawkeye" Pierce Jr.
- Elliott Gould as Captain John Francis "Trapper John" McIntyre
- Sally Kellerman as Major Margaret "Hot Lips" Houlihan
- Tom Skerritt as Captain Augustus "Duke" Forrest
- Robert Duvall as Major Frank Burns
- Roger Bowen as Lieutenant Colonel Henry Braymore Blake
- René Auberjonois as Father John Patrick Francis "Dago Red" Mulcahy
- David Arkin as Sergeant First Class Wade Douglas Vollmer (incorrectly identified as "Staff Sergeant" in the credits.)
- Jo Ann Pflug as Lieutenant Maria "Dish" Schneider
- John Schuck as Captain Walter "The Painless Pole" Waldowski, DDS
- Carl Gottlieb as Captain John "Ugly John" Black
- Danny Goldman as Captain Dennis Murrhardt
- Corey Fischer as Captain Patrick "Band-Aid" Bandini
- Indus Arthur as Lieutenant Leslie
- Dawne Damon as Lieutenant Wilma "Scorch" Storch
- Tamara Horrocks as Captain Bridget "Knocko" McCarthy
- Gary Burghoff as Corporal Walter "Radar" O'Reilly
- Ken Prymus as Private First Class Seidman
- Fred Williamson as Captain Oliver Harmon "Spearchucker" Jones
- Michael Murphy as Captain Ezekiel Bradbury "Me Lay" Marston V
- Timothy Brown as Corporal Judson
- Bud Cort as Private Warren Boone
- G. Wood as Brigadier General Charlie Hammond
- Kim Atwood as Ho-Jon
- Cathleen Cordell as Captain Peterson - Nurse Corps
- Dale Ishimoto as Korean Doctor
- Bobby Troup as Sergeant Gorman
- Marvin Miller as PA Announcer
- Ben Davidson as Football Opponent #88 - 325th Evac.

== Production ==
=== Development and writing ===
The screenplay, by Ring Lardner Jr., is different from Hooker's original novel. In the DVD audio commentary, Altman describes the novel as "pretty terrible" and somewhat "racist." He says that the novel was used only as a springboard. Despite this assertion by Altman, most sequences are in the novel, with the main deletion being a subplot of Ho-Jon's return to the 4077th as a casualty. The main deviation from the script is the trimming of much of the dialogue.

In his director's commentary, Altman says that M*A*S*H was the first major studio film to use the word "fuck" in its dialogue. (Note: However, while it is the earliest film released by a mainstream studio to use the word, it had been used earlier in a number of "underground" and/or "independent" films through the 1960s, including Andy Milligan's Vapors, Andy Warhol's Poor Little Rich Girl and My Hustler (all 1965), Joseph Strick's Ulysses, Michael Winner's I'll Never Forget What's'isname, Lenny Bruce's Lenny Bruce in Lenny Bruce (all 1967), and Barney Platts-Mills' Bronco Bullfrog (1969).) The word is spoken during the football game near the end of the film by Walt "Painless Pole" Waldowski when he says to an opposing football player, "All right, Bud, your fucking head is coming right off!" The actor, John Schuck, said in an interview that Andy Sidaris, who was handling the football sequences, encouraged Schuck to "say something that'll annoy him." Schuck did so, and that particular statement made it into the film without a second thought. Previously confined to cult and "underground" films, its use in a film as conventionally screened and professionally distributed as M*A*S*H marked the dawn of a new era of social acceptability for profanity on the big screen, which had until a short time before this film's release been forbidden outright for any major studio picture in the United States under the Production Code, in effect until November 1, 1968, when the Motion Picture Association film rating system replaced it. M*A*S*H was rated R in the United States by this system.

Although a number of sources have reported that Lardner was upset with the liberties taken with his script, he denied it in his autobiography: "[...] But the departures weren't as drastic as he [Altman] made out; much of the improvisation involved a couple of scenes between Donald Sutherland and Elliott Gould in which they rephrased lines in their own words. [...] For all of Bob's interpolations and improvisations, however, the basic structure of the movie is the one laid out in my script, and each scene has the beginning, middle, end that I gave it."

=== Filming and production ===
Altman, relatively new to the filmmaking establishment at that time, lacked the credentials to justify his unorthodox filmmaking process and had a history of turning down work rather than creating a poor-quality product. Altman: "I had practice working for people who don't care about quality, and I learned how to sneak it in." "Twentieth Century Fox had two other war movies in production, Patton and Tora! Tora! Tora!" Altman remembered. "Those were big-budget pictures, and we were cheap. I knew that if I stayed under budget and didn't cause too much trouble, we could sneak through."

The filming process was difficult because of tensions between the director and his cast. During principal photography, Sutherland and Gould allegedly spent a third of their time trying to get Altman fired, although this has been disputed. Altman later commented that if he had known about Gould and Sutherland's protests, he would have resigned. Gould later sent a letter of apology, and Altman used him in a number of his later works – including The Long Goodbye, California Split, Nashville, and The Player – but Altman never worked with Sutherland again.

Because of the context of the film being made – during the height of America's involvement in the Vietnam War – Fox was concerned that audiences would not understand that it was ostensibly taking place during the Korean War. Fox requested a caption that mentions the Korean setting be added to the beginning of the film, and PA announcements throughout the film served the same purpose. Only a few loudspeaker announcements were used in the original cut. When Altman realized he needed more structure to his largely episodic film, editor Danford Greene suggested using more loudspeaker announcements to frame different episodes of the story. Greene took a second-unit crew and filmed additional shots of the speakers. On the same night these scenes were shot, American astronauts landed on the moon. The Korean War is explicitly referenced in announcements on the camp public address system and during a radio announcement that plays while Hawkeye and Trapper are putting in Col. Merrill's office, which also cites the film as taking place in 1951. However, one of the PA announcements mentions that the camp movie will be The Glory Brigade, a 1953 Korean War film starring Victor Mature.

== Music ==
=== Soundtrack music ===
Johnny Mandel composed incidental music used throughout the film. Also heard on the soundtrack are Japanese vocal renditions of such songs as "Tokyo Shoe Shine Boy", "My Blue Heaven", "Happy Days Are Here Again", "Chattanooga Choo Choo", and "Hi-Lili, Hi-Lo"; impromptu performances of "Onward, Christian Soldiers", "When the Lights Go On Again", and "Hail to the Chief" by cast members; and the instrumental "Washington Post March" during the climactic football game.

M*A*S*H features the song "Suicide Is Painless", with music by Mandel and lyrics by Mike Altman, the director's then 14-year-old son. The version heard under the opening credits was sung by uncredited session vocalists John Bahler, Tom Bahler, Ron Hicklin, and Ian Freebairn-Smith; on the single release, the song is attributed to "The Mash". The song is reprised later in the film by Pvt. Seidman (played by Ken Prymus) in the scene in which Painless attempts to commit suicide.

=== Soundtrack album ===
Columbia Masterworks issued a soundtrack album of the film in 1970:

1. "Suicide Is Painless (Michael Altman, lyrics and Johnny Mandel, music)"
2. "Duke and Hawkeye Arrive at M.A.S.H."
3. "The Operating Theater" / "Happy Days Are Here Again"
4. "Major Houlihan and Major Burns"
5. "Painless Suicide, Funeral, and Resurrection"
6. "'Hot Lips' Shows Her True Colors" / "Chattanooga Choo Choo"
7. "Moments to Remember" / "Happy Days Are Here Again"
8. "The Football Game"
9. "Going Home" / "Happy Days Are Here Again"
10. "M.A.S.H. Theme (Instrumental)" by Ahmad Jamal
11. "Dedication Scroll" / "Jeep Ride"
12. "The Jig's Up"
13. "To Japan"
14. "Japanese Children's Hospital"
15. "Tent Scene"
16. "Kill 'Em, Galop"

== Release ==
=== Home media ===
M*A*S*H received its first home video release in 1977 on both VHS and Betamax. This 1977 release of the film was the original, unedited version and was one of the first 50 titles released to home video by Magnetic Video Corporation (M*A*S*H was number #38).

Ster-Kinekor Video and Fox Video released the film with 20th Century Fox, which was released in 1992 in South Africa.

In the 1990s, Fox Video re-released a VHS version of the film as part of its "Selections" banner, which ran 116 minutes and was rated PG. However, this is not the alternate PG version that was released in 1973. It has the same run-time as the theatrical release; none of the aforementioned scenes or theme music was removed. The actual 1973 PG-edited version has never been issued on home video in the United States. The original cut was released on DVD on January 8, 2002, and on Blu-ray on September 1, 2009.

In 2010, the film was released on a triple feature DVD pack with The Full Monty and My Cousin Vinny.

== Reception ==
=== Box office ===
M*A*S*H was a box-office hit; it was the third highest-grossing film released in 1970 (behind Love Story and Airport). The film opened January 25, 1970, at the Baronet Theatre in New York City and grossed $37,143 in its first week. According to 20th Century Fox records, the film required $6,550,000 in rentals to break even, and by December 11, 1970, had made $31,225,000, thus making a profit for the studio. Ultimately, the film made $81.6 million against a budget of $3 million.

It was the sixth most popular film at the French box office in 1970.

Fox re-released the film to theaters in North America in late 1973. To attract audiences to the M*A*S*H television series, which had struggled in the ratings in its first season, Fox reissued the film in a version running 112 minutes and bearing a PG rating. Some of the more explicit content from the original R-rated cut was edited out, including segments of graphic surgical operations, Hot Lips' shower scene, and the use of the word "fuck" during the football game. According to film critic and historian Leonard Maltin, the film's main theme song, "Suicide is Painless", was replaced with music by Ahmad Jamal. The re-release earned an estimated $3.5 million at the box office.

=== Critical response ===
==== Contemporaneous ====
Upon its release, M*A*S*H received acclaim from critics. In a rave review, John Mahoney of The Hollywood Reporter called the film "the finest American comedy since Some Like It Hot", and "the Mister Roberts of the Korean War", as well as "The Graduate of 1970". Time magazine, in a review titled "Catch-22 Caliber", wrote of the film, "though it wears a dozen manic, libidinous masks, none quite covers the face of dread ... M.A.S.H., one of America's funniest bloody films, is also one of its bloodiest funny films." The New Yorker critic Pauline Kael wrote of the film: "I don't know when I've had such a good time at a movie. Many of the best recent American movies leave you feeling that there's nothing to do but get stoned and die, that that's your proper fate as an American. This movie heals a breach." John Simon described M*A*S*H as an 'amusingly absurdist army satire'.

Roger Ebert, in the Chicago Sun-Times, gave the film four (out of four) stars, writing

There is something about war that inspires practical jokes and the heroes ... are inspired and utterly heartless ... We laugh, not because M*A*S*H is Sgt. Bilko for adults, but because it is so true to the unadmitted sadist in all of us. There is perhaps nothing so exquisite as achieving ... sweet mental revenge against someone we hate with particular dedication. And it is the flat-out, poker-faced hatred in M*A*S*H that makes it work. Most comedies want us to laugh at things that aren't really funny; in this one we laugh precisely because they're not funny. We laugh, that we may not cry ... We can take the unusually high gore-level in M*A*S*H because it is originally part of the movie's logic. If the surgeons didn't have to face the daily list of maimed and mutilated bodies, none of the rest of their lives would make any sense ... But none of this philosophy comes close to the insane logic of M*A*S*H, which is achieved through a peculiar marriage of cinematography, acting, directing, and writing. The movie depends upon timing and tone to be funny ... One of the reasons M*A*S*H is so funny is that it's so desperate.

In contrast, Roger Greenspun of The New York Times wrote of M*A*S*H: "To my knowledge [it] is the first major American movie openly to ridicule belief in God – not phony belief; real belief. It is also one of the few (though by no means the first) American screen comedies openly to admit the cruelty of its humor. And it is at pains to blend that humor with more operating room gore than I have ever seen in any movie from any place ... Although it is impudent, bold, and often very funny, it lacks the sense of order (even in the midst of disorder) that seems the special province of successful comedy."

==== Retrospective ====
In a retrospective review for the Chicago Reader, Jonathan Rosenbaum noted that "the film ... helped launch the careers of Elliott Gould, Donald Sutherland, Sally Kellerman, Robert Duvall, and subsequent Altman regulars Rene Auberjonois and John Schuck, and won screenwriter Ring Lardner Jr. an Oscar." Rosenbaum characterized the film as "a somewhat adolescent if stylish antiauthoritarian romp ... But the misogyny and cruelty behind many of the gags are as striking as the black comedy and the original use of overlapping dialogue. This is still watchable for the verve of the ensemble acting and dovetailing direction, but some of the crassness leaves a sour aftertaste." Writing in The Guardian for the film's 50th anniversary, Noah Gittell also criticized it for having "a deep and unexamined misogyny", noting that the treatment of the Houlihan character in particular anticipated such later teen sex comedies as Animal House, Porky's and Revenge of the Nerds.

The Japanese filmmaker Akira Kurosawa cited this movie as one of his 100 favorite films. The film holds an 86% approval rating on Rotten Tomatoes, based on 58 reviews, with an average rating of 8.30/10. The website's consensus states: "Bold, timely, subversive, and above all, funny, M*A*S*H remains a high point in Robert Altman's distinguished filmography." The film also holds a score of 80 out of 100 on Metacritic, based on 8 critics, indicating "generally favorable reviews".

=== Accolades ===
Award	Category	Nominee(s)	Result
Academy Awards	Best Picture	Ingo Preminger	Nominated
Academy Awards	Best Director	Robert Altman	Nominated
Academy Awards	Best Supporting Actress	Sally Kellerman	Nominated
Academy Awards	Best Screenplay – Based on Material from Another Medium	Ring Lardner Jr.	Won
Academy Awards	Best Film Editing	Danford B. Greene	Nominated
American Cinema Editors Awards	Best Edited Feature Film	Danford B. Greene	Nominated
ASCAP Film and Television Music Awards	Most Performed Feature Film Standards	"Suicide Is Painless" – Johnny Mandel and Mike Altman	Won
ASCAP Film and Television Music Awards	Most Performed Theme	Mike Altman	Won
British Academy Film Awards	Best Film	Robert Altman	Nominated
British Academy Film Awards	Best Direction	Robert Altman	Nominated
British Academy Film Awards	Best Actor in a Leading Role	Elliott Gould	Nominated
British Academy Film Awards	Best Film Editing	Danford B. Greene	Nominated
British Academy Film Awards	Best Sound	Don Hall, David Dockendorf and Bernard Freericks	Nominated
British Academy Film Awards	United Nations Award	Robert Altman	Won
Cannes Film Festival	Palme d'Or	Robert Altman	Won
Directors Guild of America Awards	Outstanding Directorial Achievement in Motion Pictures	Robert Altman	Nominated
Golden Globe Awards	Best Motion Picture – Musical or Comedy		Won
Golden Globe Awards	Best Actor in a Motion Picture – Musical or Comedy	Elliott Gould	Nominated
Golden Globe Awards	Best Actor in a Motion Picture – Musical or Comedy	Donald Sutherland	Nominated
Golden Globe Awards	Best Supporting Actress – Motion Picture	Sally Kellerman	Nominated
Golden Globe Awards	Best Director – Motion Picture	Robert Altman	Nominated
Golden Globe Awards	Best Screenplay – Motion Picture	Ring Lardner Jr.	Nominated
Grammy Awards	Best Original Score Written for a Motion Picture or a Television Special	Johnny Mandel	Nominated
Kansas City Film Circle Critics Awards	Best Director	Robert Altman	Won
Kansas City Film Circle Critics Awards	Best Supporting Actress	Sally Kellerman	Won
Laurel Awards	Best Picture		Nominated
Laurel Awards	Top Male Comedy Performance	Elliott Gould	Won
Laurel Awards	Top Male Comedy Performance	Donald Sutherland	Nominated
Laurel Awards	Top Female Comedy Performance	Sally Kellerman	Won
National Film Preservation Board	National Film Registry		Inducted
New York Film Critics Circle Awards	Best Film		Runner-up
New York Film Critics Circle Awards	Best Director	Robert Altman	Runner-up
Online Film & Television Association Awards	Best Motion Picture		Won
Writers Guild of America Awards	Best Comedy Adapted from Another Medium	Ring Lardner Jr.	Won

In 1996, M*A*S*H was deemed "culturally significant" by the Library of Congress and was selected for preservation in the United States National Film Registry.

=== Year-end lists ===
The film is number 17 on Bravo's "100 Funniest Movies" and number 54 on "AFI" list of the top 100 American movies of all time.

American Film Institute

- 1998: AFI's 100 Years...100 Movies – #56
- 2000: AFI's 100 Years...100 Laughs – #7
- 2004: AFI's 100 Years...100 Songs:
  - "Suicide Is Painless" – #66
- 2007: AFI's 100 Years...100 Movies (10th Anniversary Edition) – #54

== See also ==
- List of American films of 1970
- Battle Circus, a 1953 Humphrey Bogart film, also set in a Korean War MASH unit
