= Bill Finnegan =

American film producer

- Born: William Robinson Finnegan; June 29, 1928; Kansas City, Missouri, US
- Died: November 28, 2008 (aged 80); Sag Harbor, New York, U.S.
- Occupations: Television producer, film producer
- Years active: 1950–2003
- Spouse: Patricia Finnegan (1952 – 2008; his death)
- Children: 4, including William Finnegan

William Robinson Finnegan (June 29, 1928 – November 28, 2008) was an American television and film producer whose well known credits included The Fabulous Baker Boys, Hawaii Five-O and the cult hit, Reality Bites. he was a five time Emmy Awards nominee.

== Early life ==
Bill Finnegan was born in Kansas City, Missouri, on June 29, 1928. He enlisted and served in the United States Navy during World War II. Finnegan initially launched a career as a newsman in 1950 when he began reporting for, among other publications, the Associated Press.

== Television and film production ==
Following a stint as a journalist and newsman, Finnegan began working as an assistant director and production manager in the television industry. Finnegan founded Finnegan-Pinchuk (originally Finnegan Associates), a production company, with his wife, Patricia Finnegan, and their business partner, Sheldon Pinchuk. Their company, headquartered in Studio City, California, became a supplier of network and cable television movies by the late 1970s and 1980s. Their company additionally opened a office in New York City in 1993.

Television productions by Finnegan-Pinchuk included Wes Craven's Summer of Fear in 1978; The Ordeal of Patty Hearst (1979) starring Dennis Weaver; The $5.20 an Hour Dream with Linda Lavin in 1980; 1982's World War III starring Rock Hudson; Jane Fonda's The Dollmaker in 1984; Amos, starring Kirk Douglas in 1985; The Atlanta Child Murders with Morgan Freeman, also aired in 1985; Circle of Violence which starred Tuesday Weld and River Phoenix in 1986, Babes in Toyland with Drew Barrymore in 1986, and Hoover in 1987, which starred Treat Williams. Finnegan also produced several television shows, including Hawaii Five-O in 1977 and The Days and Nights of Molly Dodd ten years later in 1987, and the Emmy-award-winning Northern Exposure, which aired from 1990 to 1995.

Finnegan and his company also produced or co-produced feature films including Support Your Local Gunfighter in 1971; North Shore in 1987; The Fabulous Baker Boys in 1989; White Palace in 1990; The Babe in 1992; CrissCross in 1992; Reality Bites, starring Ben Stiller, in 1994; and Ed, starring Matt LeBlanc, in 1996. Finnegan officially retired from the production business in 2003.

== Death ==
Bill Finnegan died of Parkinson's disease at his home in Sag Harbor, New York, on November 28, 2008, at the age of 80. He and his wife, Patricia Finnegan, had four children – Michael Finnegan, a political reporter for the Los Angeles Times; William Finnegan, a staff reporter for The New Yorker; Colleen, a doctor; and Kevin, a labor lawyer.

== Television films ==
- Summer of Fear (1978)
- The Ordeal of Patty Hearst (1979)
- A Vacation in Hell (1979)
- The $5.20 an Hour Dream (1980)
- World War III (1982)
- Flight 90: Disaster on the Potomac (1984)
- The Dollmaker (1984)
- Amos (1985)
- The Atlanta Child Murders (1985)
- Circle of Violence (1986)
- Babes in Toyland (1986)
- Hoover (1987)

== Filmography ==
- Support Your Local Gunfighter (1971)
- North Shore (1987)
- The Fabulous Baker Boys (1989)
- White Palace (1990)
- The Babe (1992)
- CrissCross (1992)
- Reality Bites (1994)
- Ed (1996)

== Television ==
- Hawaii Five-O (1977)
- The Days and Nights of Molly Dodd (1987)
- Baby Boom (1988-1989)
- Northern Exposure (1990–1995)
