= Carpool (1983 film) =

- Genre: Action; Comedy
- Directed by: E. W. Swackhamer
- Starring: Ernest Borgnine; Harvey Korman; Peter Scolari; T. K. Carter; Stephanie Faracy
- Theme music composer: Jimmie Haskell
- Country of origin: United States
- Original language: English

Production
- Executive producer: Charles W. Fries
- Producers: Carole Cherry; Stanley Z. Cherry
- Cinematography: Dennis Dalzell
- Editor: Gloryette Clark
- Running time: 100 minutes
- Production company: Charles Fries Productions

Original release
- Network: CBS
- Release: October 5, 1983

Carpool is a 1983 made-for-television film directed by E. W. Swackhamer.

== Plot ==
With carpools being assigned by computer, four partners – a call center employee, a nun turned college student, an actor and a boxer – form into a carpool which comes into possession of a million dollars that has fallen off an armored car. An ex-policeman has his eyes on the loot as well, and the chase is on.
