= Return of the Rebels =

1981 television film

- Genre: Drama
- Written by: Robie Robinson
- Directed by: Noel Nosseck
- Starring: Barbara Eden; Don Murray; Christopher Connelly; Robert Mandan; Jamie Farr; Patrick Swayze
- Music by: Michael Melvoin
- Country of origin: United States
- Original language: English

Production
- Producer: Frank von Zerneck
- Production location: Parker, Arizona
- Cinematography: Rexford Metz
- Editor: Kurt Hirschler
- Running time: 100 minutes
- Production company: Filmways Television

Original release
- Network: CBS
- Release: October 17, 1981

Return of the Rebels (working title The Eagle Rock Rebels Ride Again) is a 1981 American made-for-television biker drama film starring Barbara Eden, Don Murray, Christopher Connelly, Robert Mandan, Jamie Farr and Patrick Swayze. It originally premiered on CBS on October 17, 1981.

Directed by Noel Nosseck and produced by Filmways Television, the film was one of Patrick Swayze's first feature roles.

== Synopsis ==
Mary Beth Allen (Barbara Eden), a retired former motorcycle club member, is a widowed operator of a campground along the Colorado River (Big Bend National Park) which is being threatened and taken over by a group of "River Rats" led by K.C. Barnes (Patrick Swayze) that drive away the campground's regular clients.

Mary Beth is helped by her friends, former members of "The Eagle Rock Rebels" motorcycle gang (Don Murray, Christopher Connelly, Robert Mandan and Jamie Farr), who come to the camp for their 25-year reunion and run off the troublemakers. Mary Beth starts a relationship with Sonny (Don Murray).

== Cast ==
- Barbara Eden - Mary Beth Allen
- Don Murray - Sonny Morgan
- Christopher Connelly - Jay Arnold Wayne
- Robert Mandan - Big Al Williams
- Jamie Farr - Mickey Fine
- Patrick Swayze - K.C. Barnes

== Filming ==
Return of the Rebels was filmed on location from April to May 1981 at Lake Havasu City in Mohave County, Arizona.

== Home media ==
On October 18, 2011, Return of the Rebels was released as an exclusive manufacture-on-demand (MOD) DVD-R by MGM Limited Edition Collection.
