= Ernest Borgnine =

American actor (1917–2012)

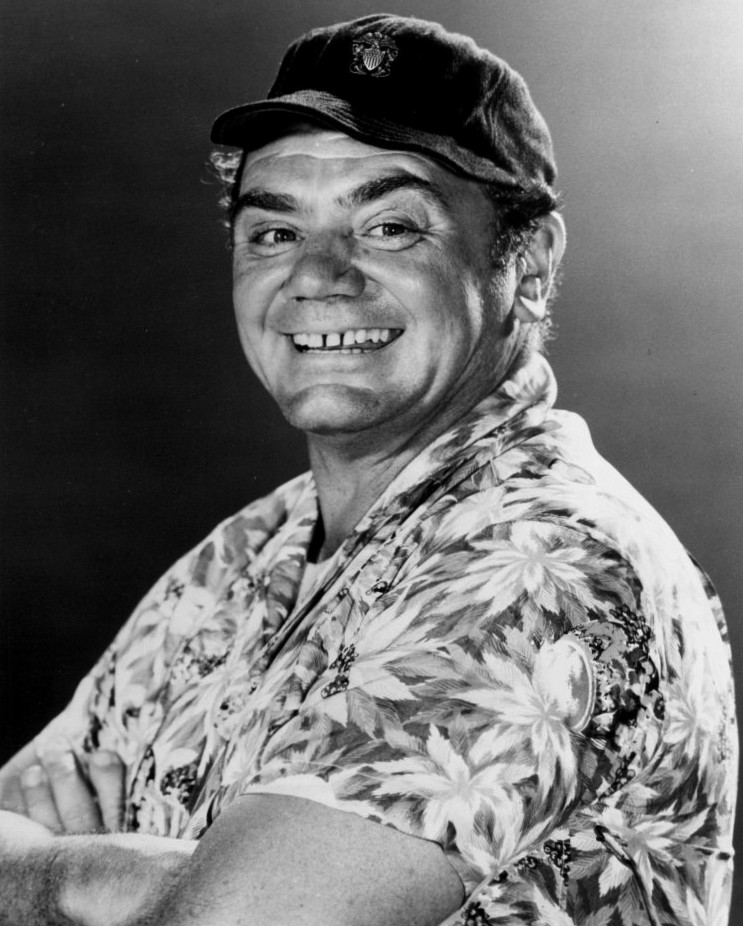
- Publicity photo for McHale's Navy, 1962
- Born: Ermes Effron Borgnino; January 24, 1917; Hamden, Connecticut, U.S.
- Died: July 8, 2012 (aged 95); Los Angeles, California, U.S.
- Monuments: Cenotaph at Forest Lawn Memorial Park, Hollywood Hills, Los Angeles
- Occupation: Actor
- Years active: 1947–2012
- Spouses: Rhoda Kemins (m. 1949; div. 1958); Katy Jurado (m. 1959; div. 1963); Ethel Merman (m. 1964; div. 1964); Donna Rancourt (m. 1965; div. 1972); Tova Traesnaes (m. 1973)
- Children: 4
- Military career
- Allegiance: United States of America
- Branch: United States Navy
- Service years: 1935–1945 (Note: Honorably discharged in October 1941, re-enlisted in January 1942.)
- Rank: Gunner's mate first class; Chief petty officer (honorary)
- Conflicts: World War II; Battle of the Atlantic
- Awards: Navy Good Conduct Medal (2); American Defense Service Medal; American Campaign Medal; World War II Victory Medal

Signature
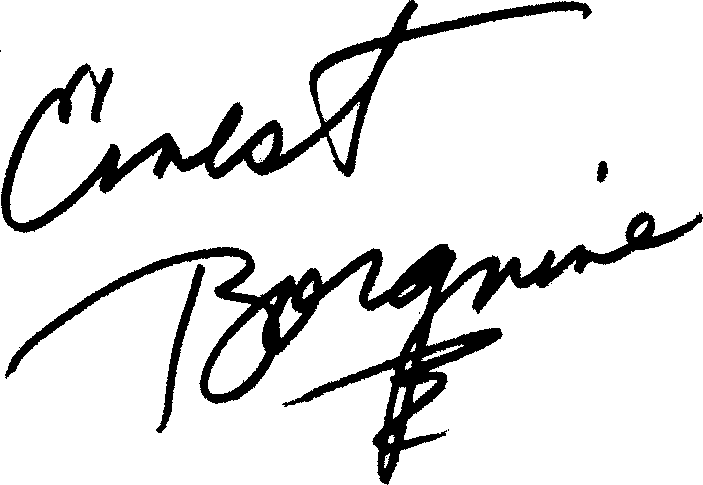

Ernest Borgnine (/ˈbɔːrɡnaɪn/ BORG-nyne; born Ermes Effron Borgnino; January 24, 1917 – July 8, 2012) was an American actor whose career spanned over six decades. He was noted for his gruff but relaxed voice and gap-toothed Cheshire Cat grin. A popular performer, he appeared as a guest on numerous talk shows and as a panelist on several game shows.

Borgnine's film career began in 1951 and included supporting roles in China Corsair (1951), From Here to Eternity (1953), Vera Cruz (1954), Bad Day at Black Rock (1955), and The Wild Bunch (1969). He played the unconventional lead in many films, winning the Academy Award for Best Actor for his role in Marty (1955), which won the Academy Award for Best Picture. Borgnine starred as the title character in the sitcom McHale's Navy (1962–1966) and co-starred as Dominic Santini in the action series Airwolf (1984–1986).

Borgnine earned his third Primetime Emmy Award nomination at age 92 for his work on the 2009 series finale of ER. He was the voice of Mermaid Man on SpongeBob SquarePants from 1999 until his death in 2012.

== Early life and education ==
Borgnine was born Ermes Effron Borgnino (Italian: [borˈɲiːno]) on January 24, 1917, in Hamden, Connecticut, the son of Italian immigrants. His mother, Anna (née Boselli, 1894–1947) hailed from Carpi, near Modena, and his father Camillo Borgnino (1891–1975) was a native of Ottiglio near Alessandria. Borgnine's parents separated when he was two years old, and he lived with his mother in Italy for about four and a half years. By 1923, his parents had reconciled, the family name was changed from Borgnino to Borgnine, and his father changed his first name to Charles. Borgnine had a younger sister, Evelyn Borgnine Velardi. The family settled in New Haven, Connecticut, where Borgnine graduated from James Hillhouse High School. He took to sports while growing up and showed no interest in acting.

== Military service ==
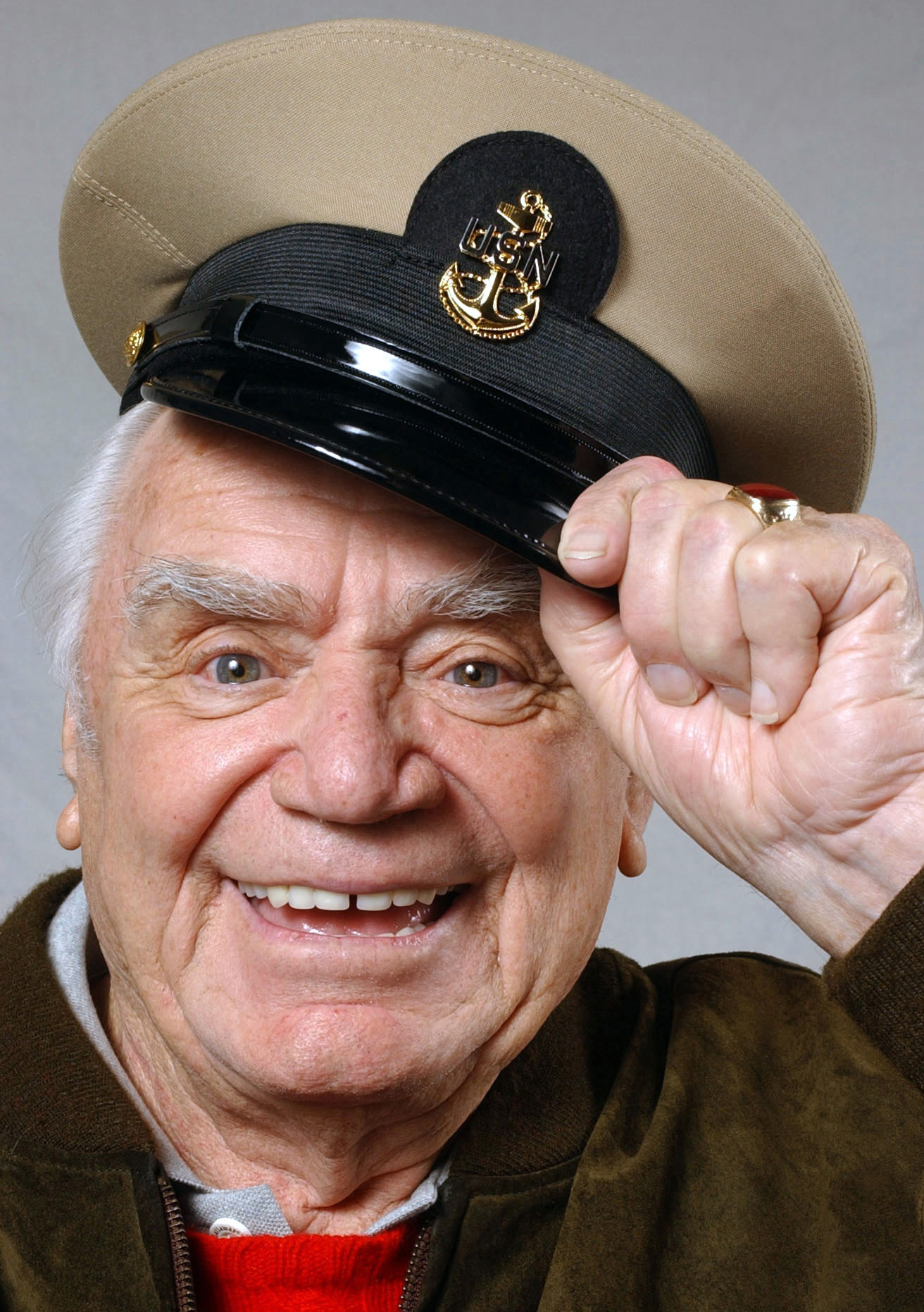
Borgnine wearing a chief petty officer's cap in October 2004

Borgnine joined the United States Navy in October 1935, after graduation from high school. He served aboard the destroyer/minesweeper USS Lamberton and was honorably discharged from the Navy in October 1941. In January 1942, he re-enlisted in the Navy after the attack on Pearl Harbor. During World War II, he patrolled the Atlantic Coast on an antisubmarine warfare ship, the patrol yacht USS Sylph. In September 1945, he was once again honorably discharged from the Navy. He served a total of almost 10 years in the Navy and obtained the grade of gunner's mate first class. His military awards include the Navy Good Conduct Medal, American Defense Service Medal with "A" Device, American Campaign Medal with 3/16" bronze star, and the World War II Victory Medal.

=== Later honors ===
In 1997, Borgnine received the United States Navy Memorial, Lone Sailor Award. On December 7, 2000, Borgnine was named the Veterans Foundation's Veteran of the Year.

In October 2004, Borgnine received the honorary title of chief petty officer from Master Chief Petty Officer of the Navy Terry D. Scott. The ceremony for Borgnine's naval advancement was held at the U.S. Navy Memorial in Washington, DC. He received the special honor for his naval service and support of naval personnel and their families worldwide.

== Acting career ==
=== 1946–1952: Theatre and television roles ===
Borgnine returned to his parents' house in Connecticut after his Navy discharge without a job to go back to and no direction. In a British Film Institute interview about his life and career, he said:

After World War II, we wanted no more part in war. I didn't even want to be a Boy Scout. I went home and said that I was through with the Navy and so now, what do we do? So I went home to mother, and after a few weeks of patting me on the back and "You did good," and everything else, one day she said, "Well?" like mothers do. Which meant, "All right, you gonna get a job or what?"

He took a local factory job, but was unwilling to settle down to that kind of work. His mother encouraged him to pursue a more glamorous profession and suggested to him that his personality would be well suited for the stage. He surprised his mother by taking the suggestion to heart, although his father was far from enthusiastic. In 2011, Borgnine remembered,

She said, "You always like getting in front of people and making a fool of yourself, why don't you give it a try?" I was sitting at the kitchen table and I saw this light. No kidding. It sounds crazy. And 10 years later, I had Grace Kelly handing me an Academy Award.

He studied acting at the Randall School of Drama in Hartford, then moved to Virginia, where he became a member of the Barter Theatre in Abingdon, Virginia. It had been named for the director's allowing audiences to barter produce for admission during the cash-lean years of the Great Depression. In 1947, Borgnine landed his first stage role in State of the Union. Although it was a short role, he won over the audience. His next role was as the Gentleman Caller in Tennessee Williams' The Glass Menagerie.

In 1949, Borgnine went to New York City, where he had his Broadway debut in the role of a nurse in the play Harvey. Borgnine made his TV debut as a character actor in Captain Video and His Video Rangers, beginning in 1951. These two episodes led to countless other television roles that Borgnine gained on Goodyear Television Playhouse, The Ford Television Theatre, Fireside Theatre, Frontier Justice, Laramie, Bob Hope Presents the Chrysler Theatre, and Run for Your Life. An appearance as the villain on TV's Captain Video led to Borgnine's casting in the motion picture The Whistle at Eaton Falls (1951) for Columbia Pictures. In 1957, he appeared in the first episode of the TV Western series Wagon Train.

=== 1953–1961: Film stardom ===
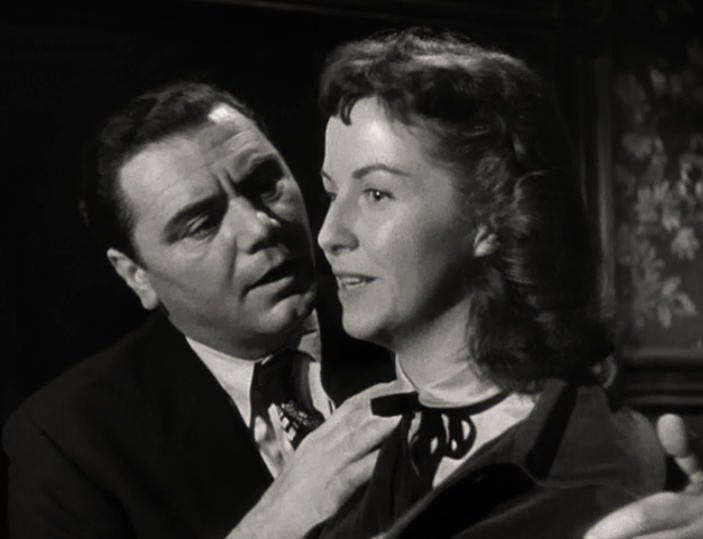
Borgnine and Betsy Blair in a trailer for Marty, 1955

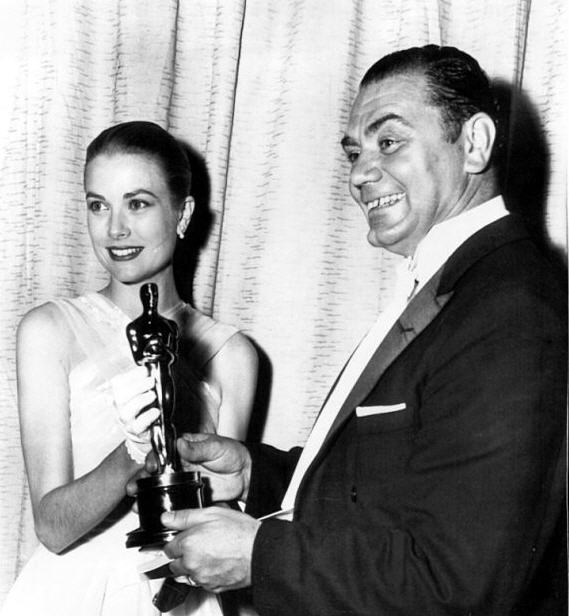
Grace Kelly presents the Oscar for Best Actor to Borgnine for his performance in Marty, 1956.

Borgnine moved to Los Angeles, California, where he received his big break in a Columbia film directed by Fred Zinnemann, the romantic war drama From Here to Eternity (1953), playing the sadistic Sergeant "Fatso" Judson, who beats a stockade prisoner in his charge, Angelo Maggio (played by Frank Sinatra). The film received critical acclaim, including the Academy Award for Best Picture. The following year, he acted in four films, three of them Western dramas, Johnny Guitar starring Joan Crawford, The Bounty Hunter with Randolph Scott, Vera Cruz starring Burt Lancaster and Gary Cooper, and in the Biblical drama Demetrius and the Gladiators. Borgnine built a reputation as a dependable character actor, and played villains in early films, including movies such as Johnny Guitar and Vera Cruz.

In 1955, he starred as a villain in the John Sturges neo-Western Bad Day at Black Rock starring Spencer Tracy, Lee Marvin, and Walter Brennan. He starred as Marty Piletti, the titular warmhearted butcher in Marty, the 1955 film version of the television play of the same title. The film debuted at the Cannes Film Festival where it received acclaim and the Palme D'Or. Borgnine won numerous accolades, including the Academy Award for Best Actor beating Frank Sinatra, James Dean (who had died by the time of the ceremony), and former Best Actor winners Spencer Tracy and James Cagney. He also received the BAFTA Award for Best Actor in a Leading Role, Golden Globe Award for Best Actor – Motion Picture Drama, the National Board of Review Award for Best Actor, and the New York Film Critics Circle Award for Best Actor.

Borgnine travelled to Australia to play the lead in a role originally intended for Burt Lancaster, the cane cutter Roo, in Summer of the Seventeenth Doll.

=== 1962–1966: McHale's Navy ===
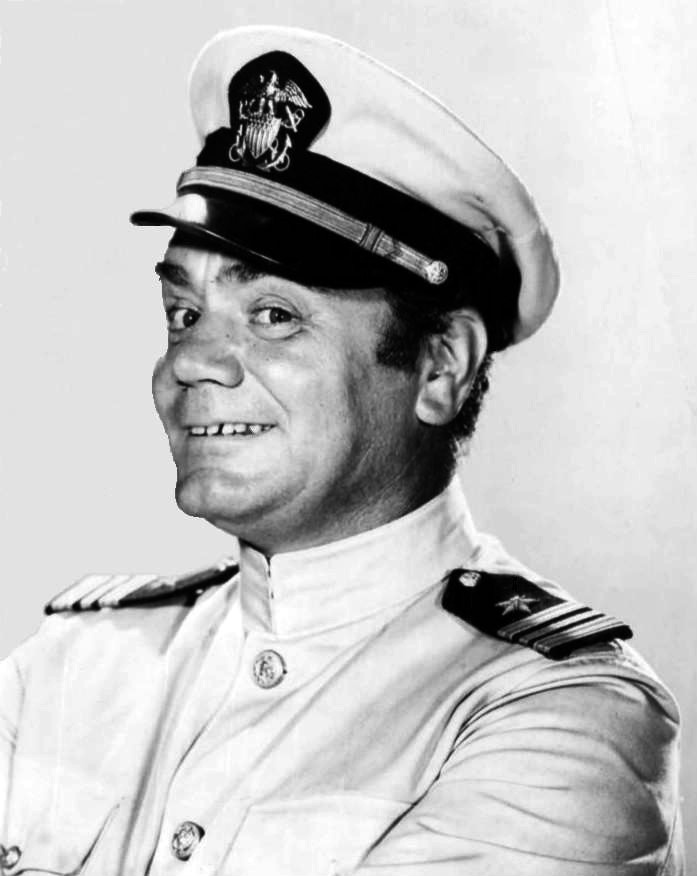
Publicity photo of Borgnine in McHale's Navy in 1963

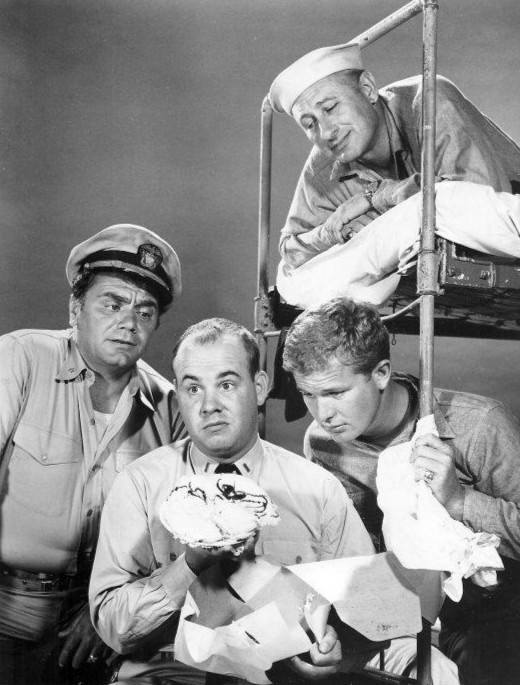
Borgnine, Tim Conway, Gary Vinson, and Carl Ballantine (in top bunk) in McHale's Navy in 1962

In 1962, Borgnine signed a contract with Universal Studios for the lead role as the gruff but lovable skipper, Quinton McHale, in what began as a serious one-hour 1962 episode called "Seven Against the Sea" for Alcoa Premiere, and later reworked to a comedy called McHale's Navy, a World War II sitcom, which also co-starred unfamiliar comedians Joe Flynn as Capt. Wally Binghamton and Tim Conway as Ens. Charles Parker. The insubordinate crew of PT-73 helped the show become a success during its first season, landing in the top 30 in 1963.

In 1963, he received an Emmy nomination for Outstanding Lead Actor in a Comedy Series. At the end of the fourth season, in 1966, low ratings and repetitive storylines brought McHale's Navy to an end. At the time McHale's Navy began production, Borgnine was married to actress Katy Jurado. Her death in 2002 drew Borgnine and Conway much closer; about his acting mentor's long career, Conway said: "There were no limits to Ernie. When you look at his career—Fatso Judson to Marty, that's about as varied as you get in characters and he handled both of them with equal delicacy and got the most out of those characters."

=== 1967–1982: Continued success ===
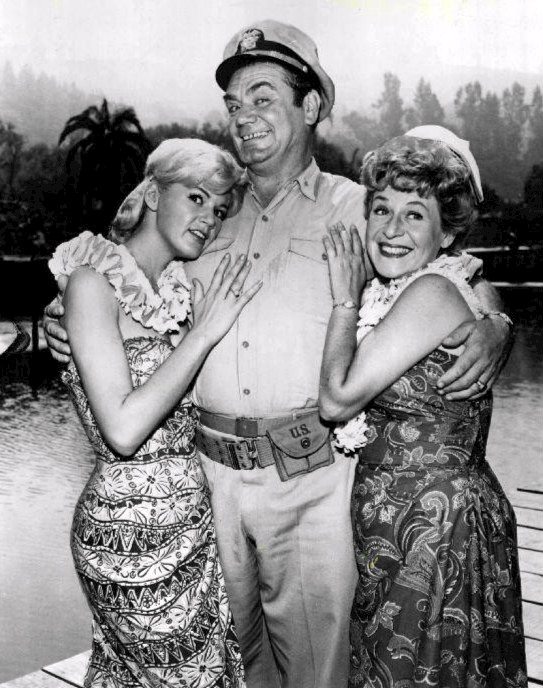
With Rochelle Rac and Jane Dulo in 1962

Borgnine's film career flourished for the next three decades, including roles in The Flight of the Phoenix (1965), The Dirty Dozen (1967) with Lee Marvin, Ice Station Zebra (1968), Willard (1971) The Poseidon Adventure (1972), Emperor of the North (1973), Convoy (1978), The Black Hole (1979), All Quiet on the Western Front (1979), Super Fuzz (1980), and Escape from New York (1981). One of his most famous roles was that of Dutch in the Western classic The Wild Bunch (1969) from director Sam Peckinpah. Of his role in The Wild Bunch, Borgnine later said, "I did [think it was a moral film]. Because to me, every picture should have some kind of a moral to it. I feel that when we used to watch old pictures, as we still do, I'm sure, the bad guys always got it in the end and the good guys always won out. Today, it's a little different. Today, it seems that the bad guys are getting the good end of it. There was always a moral in our story".

During this time, he appeared on numerous television shows, such as Little House on the Prairie (a two-part episode entitled "The Lord is My Shepherd"), The Love Boat, Magnum, P.I., Highway to Heaven, Murder, She Wrote, Walker, Texas Ranger, Home Improvement, Touched by an Angel, the final episodes of ER, and many others.

=== 1983–2011: Final appearances ===
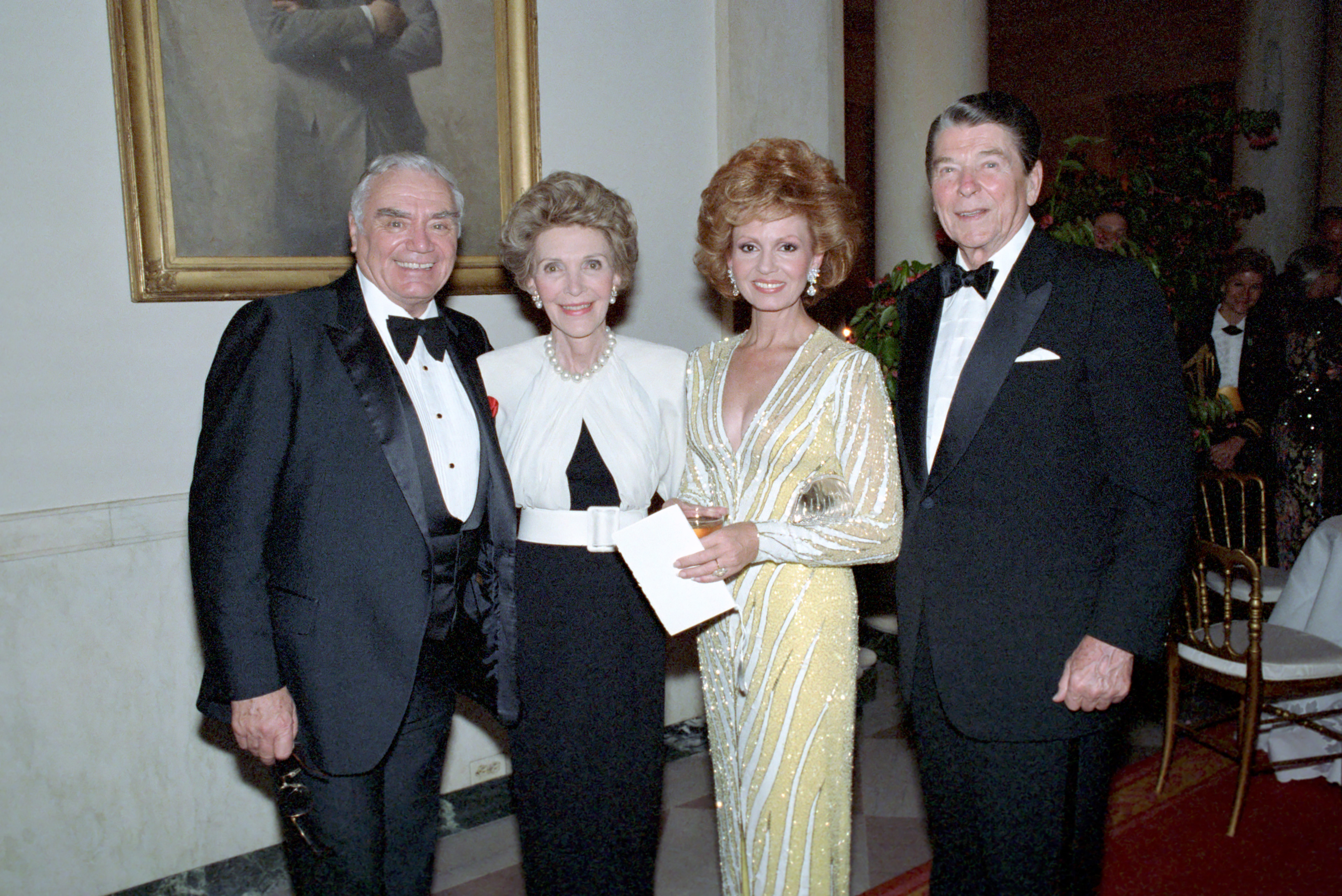
Borgnine, Nancy Reagan, Tova Borgnine, and President Ronald Reagan in 1987

Borgnine returned to Universal Studios in 1983 for a co-starring role opposite Jan-Michael Vincent on Airwolf. After he was approached by producer Donald P. Bellisario, who had been impressed by Borgnine's guest role as a wrestler in a 1982 episode of Magnum, P.I., he agreed to join the series. He played Dominic Santini, a helicopter pilot; the show became an immediate hit. Borgnine's strong performances belied his exhaustion due to the grueling production schedule and the challenges of working with his younger series lead. The show was canceled by CBS in 1986.

In 1989, Borgnine went to Namibia to shoot the film Laser Mission, starring Brandon Lee. It was released in 1990.

in 1995, he appeared with Jonathan Silverman in The Single Guy as doorman Manny Cordoba, which lasted two seasons. According to Silverman, Borgnine came to work with more energy and passion than all other stars combined. He was the first person to arrive on the set every day and the last to leave.

The next year, Borgnine starred in the televised fantasy/thriller film Merlin's Shop of Mystical Wonders (partially adapted from the 1984 horror film The Devil's Gift). As narrator and storyteller, Borgnine recounts a string of related supernatural tales, his modern-day fables notably centering on an enchanted and malicious cymbal-banging monkey toy stolen from the wizard Merlin. The film was later featured in the parodical television series Mystery Science Theater 3000 and has since gained a prominent cult following. Also in 1996, Borgnine toured the United States on a bus to meet his fans and see the country. The trip was the subject of a 1997 documentary, Ernest Borgnine on the Bus. He served one year as the chairman of the National Salute to Hospitalized Veterans, visiting patients in many Department of Veterans Affairs medical centers.

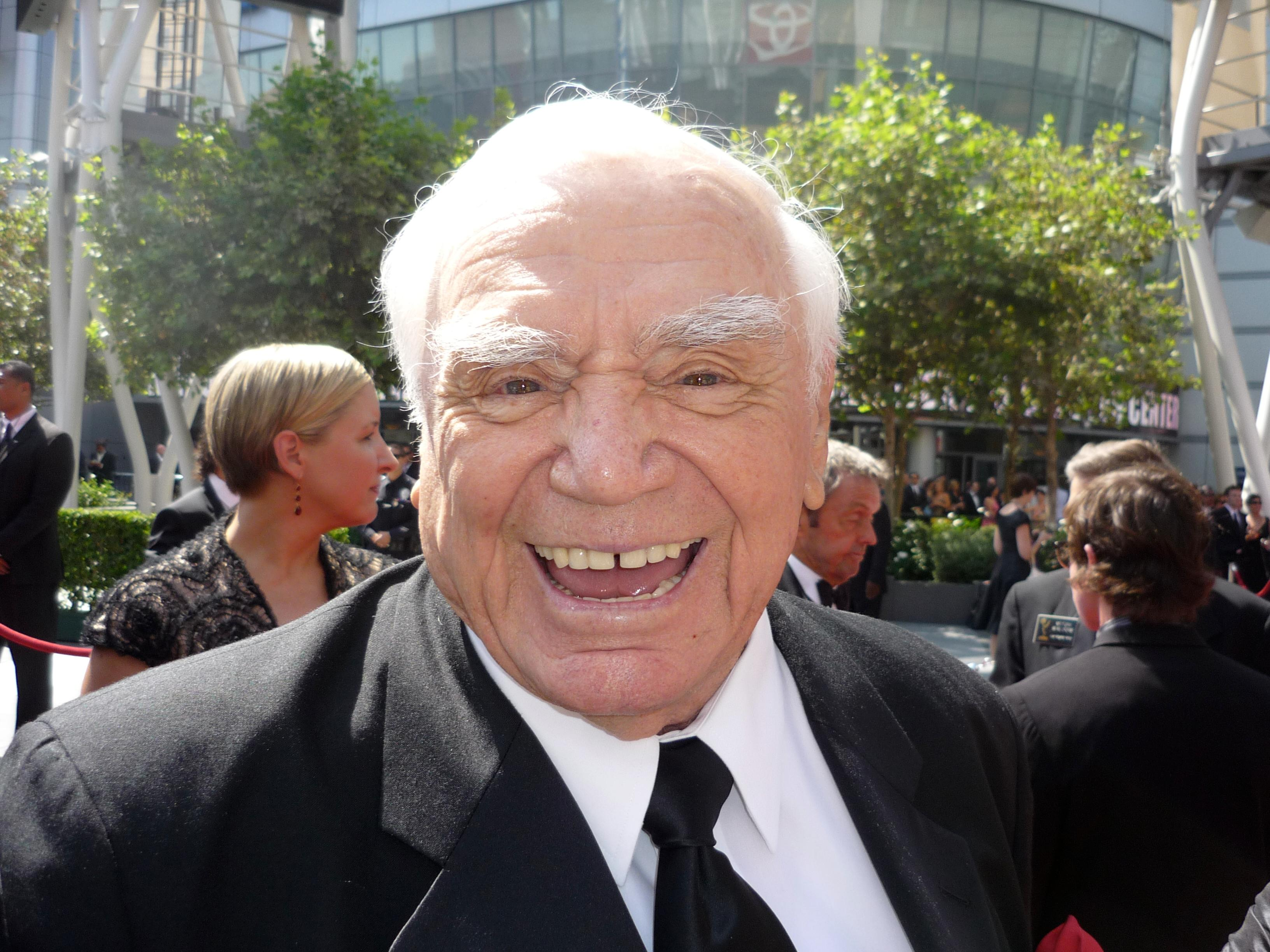
Borgnine at the Creative Arts Emmys, in 2009

In 1997, Borgnine appeared in the big-screen adaptation comedy film McHale's Navy, where he played Rear Admiral Quinton McHale, who was the father of Tom Arnold's character, Quinton McHale Jr. In 1998, Borgnine appeared in the Trey Parker and Matt Stone comedy BASEketball as entrepreneur Ted Denslow. Starting in 1999, Borgnine provided his voice talent to the animated sitcom SpongeBob SquarePants as the elderly superhero Mermaid Man (where he was paired up with McHale's Navy co-star Tim Conway as the voice of Mermaid Man's sidekick Barnacle Boy). He expressed affection for this role, in no small part for its popularity among children. After his death, Nickelodeon aired again all of the episodes in which Mermaid Man appeared, in memoriam. Additionally, The SpongeBob Movie: Sponge Out of Water was dedicated to his memory. Borgnine appeared as himself in The Simpsons episode "Boy-Scoutz 'n the Hood", in addition to a number of television commercials. In 2000, he was the executive producer of Hoover, in which he was the only credited actor.

In 2007, Borgnine starred in the Hallmark original film A Grandpa for Christmas. He played a man, who discovers, after his estranged daughter ends up in the hospital because of a car accident, that he has a granddaughter he never knew about. She is taken into his care, and they become great friends. Borgnine received a Golden Globe nomination for Best Actor in a Miniseries or Motion Picture made for Television for his performance. At 90, he was the oldest Golden Globe nominee ever. In 2010, he costarred in The Wishing Well. Borgnine's autobiography Ernie was published by Citadel Press in July 2008. Ernie is a loose, conversational recollection of highlights from his acting career and notable events from his personal life. On April 2, 2009, he appeared in several episodes of the final season of the long-running medical series ER. His role was that of a husband dealing with the decline of his wife, who would die in the final episode of the series. In his final scene, his character is in a hospital bed lying beside his just-deceased wife. His performance garnered an Emmy nomination for Outstanding Guest Actor in a Drama Series, his third Emmy nomination and his first in 29 years (since being nominated for Outstanding Supporting Actor in a Limited Series or a Special in 1980 for All Quiet on the Western Front).

In 2009, at age 92, he starred as Frank, the main character of Another Harvest Moon, directed by Greg Swartz and also starring Piper Laurie and Anne Meara. On October 2, 2010, Borgnine appeared as himself in a "What Up with That?" sketch with Morgan Freeman on Saturday Night Live. On October 15, 2010, he appeared in Red, which was filmed earlier that year. In late 2011, Borgnine completed what became his last film, playing Rex Page in The Man Who Shook the Hand of Vicente Fernandez.

== Personal life and death ==
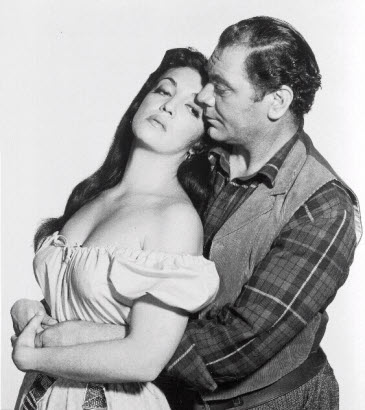
Borgnine with future wife Katy Jurado in 1958

Borgnine married five times. His first marriage, from 1949 to 1958, was to Rhoda Kemins, whom he met while serving in the Navy. They had one daughter, Nancee (born May 28, 1952). He was married to actress Katy Jurado from 1959 to 1963. Borgnine's rancorous marriage to actress and singer Ethel Merman in 1964 lasted only 42 days. Merman's description of the marriage in her autobiography was a solitary blank page. Borgnine's friend Tim Conway later said: "Ernie is volatile. I mean, there's no question about that, and Ethel was a very strong lady. So you put two bombs in a room, something is going to explode, and I guess it probably did."

From 1965 to 1972, Borgnine was married to Donna Rancourt, with whom he had a son, Cristopher (1969), and two daughters, Sharon (1965) and Diana (1970). His fifth and final marriage was to businesswoman Tova Traesnaes. Their wedding was on February 24, 1973, and they remained together until his death.

In 2000, Borgnine received his 50-year pin as a Freemason at Abingdon Lodge No. 48 in Abingdon, Virginia. He joined the Scottish Rite Valley of Los Angeles in 1964, received the Knights Commander of the Court of Honor (KCCH) in 1979, was crowned a 33° Inspector General Honorary in 1983, and received the Grand Cross of the Court of Honour in 1991.

Borgnine was a heavy smoker until 1962. In a November 2008 interview, a then 91-year-old Borgnine was asked by Fox News morning host Steve Doocy to reveal the secret of his longevity, and he whispered into a live mic, "I masturbate a lot."

At the age of 95, Borgnine died of renal failure on July 8, 2012, at Cedars-Sinai Medical Center. He had undergone surgery a month prior to his death and had been to the hospital for a routine medical checkup a few days before dying. He was cremated and given a military funeral.

Borgnine was a lifelong conservative Republican who actively supported the presidential campaigns and administrations of Richard Nixon, Ronald Reagan, George H. W. Bush, and George W. Bush.

== Filmography ==
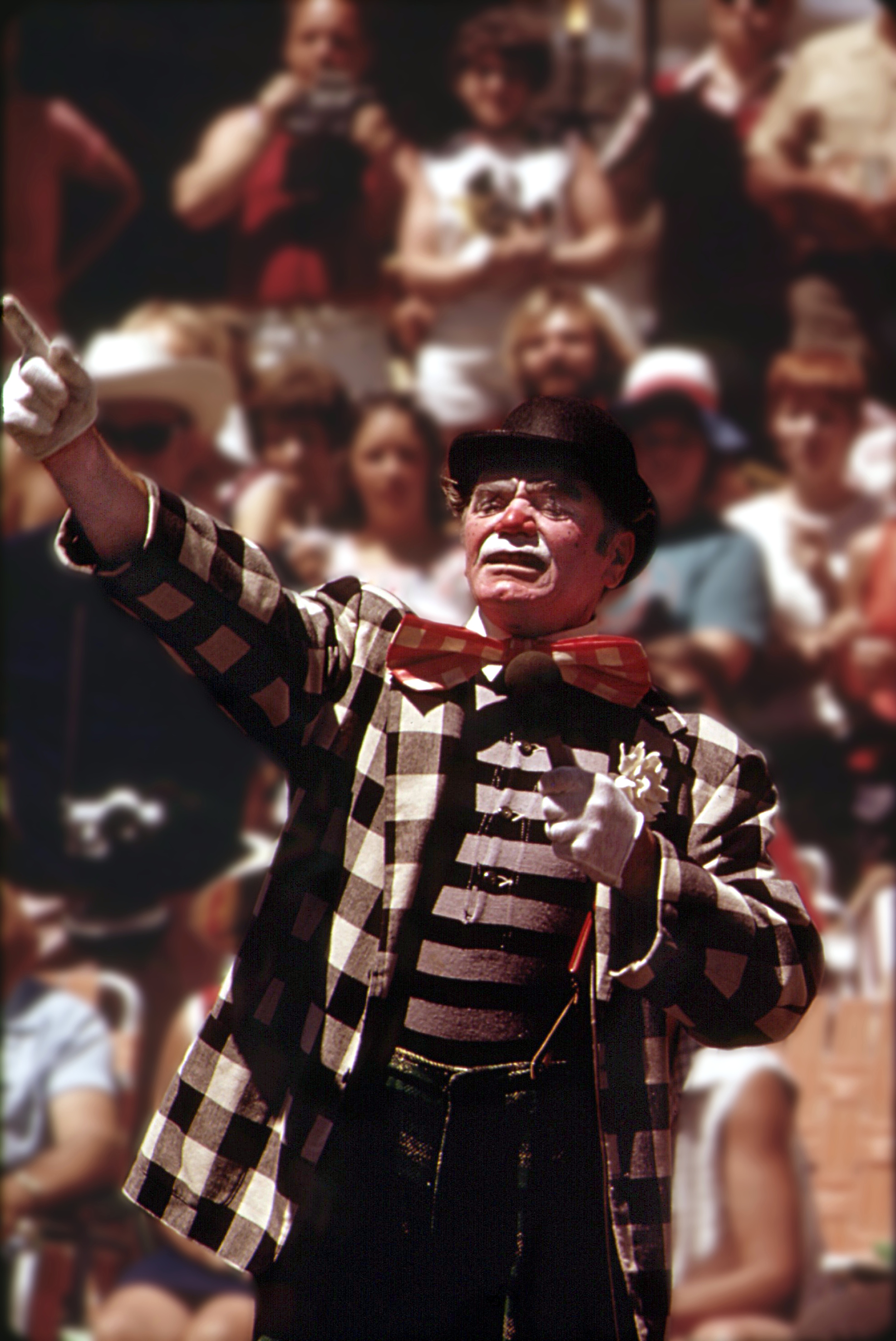
Borgnine as "Grand Clown" in Milwaukee's annual Great Circus Parade in 1973

=== Film ===
Year	Title	Role	Notes
1951	China Corsair	Hu Chang	
1951	The Whistle at Eaton Falls	Bill Street	
1951	The Mob	Joe Castro	
1953	Treasure of the Golden Condor	Bit part	
1953	The Stranger Wore a Gun	Bull Slager	
1953	From Here to Eternity	Staff Sergeant James R. "Fatso" Judson	
1954	Johnny Guitar	Bart Lonergan	
1954	Demetrius and the Gladiators	Strabo	
1954	The Bounty Hunter	Bill Rachin	
1954	Vera Cruz	Donnegan	
1955	Bad Day at Black Rock	Coley Trimble	
1955	Violent Saturday	Stadt, Amish Farmer	
1955	Marty	Marty Piletti	
1955	Run for Cover	Morgan	
1955	The Last Command	Mike Radin	
1955	The Square Jungle	Bernie Browne	
1956	Jubal	Shep Horgan	
1956	The Catered Affair	Tom Hurley	
1956	The Best Things in Life Are Free	Lew Brown	
1956	Three Brave Men	Bernard F. "Bernie" Goldsmith	
1958	The Vikings	Ragnar	
1958	The Badlanders	John "Mac" McBain	
1958	Torpedo Run	Lt. Commander Archer "Archie" Sloan	
1959	The Rabbit Trap	Eddie Colt	
1959	Summer of the Seventeenth Doll	Roo Webber	
1960	Man on a String	Boris Mitrov	
1960	Pay or Die	Police Lieutenant Joseph Petrosino	
1961	Go Naked in the World	Pete Stratton	
1961	Black City	Peppino Navarra	
1961	The Last Judgement	Pickpocket	
1961	The Italian Brigands	Sante Carbone	
1961	Barabbas	Lucius	
1964	McHale's Navy	Lt. Commander Quinton McHale, Sr	Spin-off of the series of the same name
1965	The Flight of the Phoenix	Trucker Cobb	
1966	The Oscar	Barney Yale	
1967	Chuka	Sergeant Otto Hansbach	
1967	The Dirty Dozen	Major General Sam Worden	
1968	The Man Who Makes the Difference	Himself	Documentary short film
1968	The Legend of Lylah Clare	Barney Sheean	
1968	The Split	Bert Clinger	
1968	Ice Station Zebra	Boris Vaslov	
1969	The Wild Bunch	Dutch Engstrom	
1969	A Bullet for Sandoval	Don Pedro Sandoval	
1970	The Adventurers	Fat Cat	
1970	Suppose They Gave a War and Nobody Came?	Sheriff Harve	
1971	Sam Hill: Who Killed Mr. Foster?	Deputy Sam Hill	
1971	Willard	Al Martin	
1971	Bunny O'Hare	Bill Green / William Gruenwald	
1971	Hannie Caulder	Emmett Clemens	
1971	The Trackers	Sam Paxton	
1971	Rain for a Dusty Summer	The General	
1972	The World of Sport Fishing	Himself	Documentary
1972	Film Portrait	Himself	Documentary
1972	Ripped Off	Captain Perkins	
1972	The Revengers	Hoop	
1972	The Poseidon Adventure	Det. Lt. Mike Rogo	
1973	Emperor of the North Pole	Shack	
1973	The Neptune Factor	Chief Diver Don MacKay	
1973	Legend in Granite	Vince Lombardi	
1974	Twice in a Lifetime	Vince Boselli	
1974	Law and Disorder	Cy	
1974	Sunday in the Country	Adam Smith	
1975	The Devil's Rain	Jonathan "John" Corbis	
1975	Hustle	Santuro	
1976	Holiday Hookers	Max	
1976	Shoot	Lou	
1977	The Greatest	Angelo Dundee	
1977	Crossed Swords	John Canty	
1978	Cops and Robin	Joe Cleaver	
1978	Convoy	Sheriff Lyle 'Cottonmouth'	
1979	Ravagers	Rann	
1979	The Double McGuffin	Mr. Firat	
1979	All Quiet on the Western Front	Stanislaus "Kat" Katczinsky	
1979	The Black Hole	Harry Booth	
1980	When Time Ran Out	Detective Sergeant Tom Conti	
1980	Super Fuzz	Sergeant Willy Dunlop	
1981	High Risk	Clint	
1981	Escape from New York	Cabbie	
1981	Deadly Blessing	Isaiah Schmidt	
1983	Young Warriors	Lieutenant Bob Carrigan	
1983	Carpool	Mickey Doyle	
1984	Code Name: Wild Geese	Fletcher	
1984	Love Leads the Way: A True Story	Senator Brighton	
1984	Man Hunt	Ben Robeson	
1988	Skeleton Coast	Colonel Smith	
1988	The Opponent	Victor	
1988	Spike of Bensonhurst	Baldo Cacetti	
1988	The Big Turnaround	Father Lopez	
1988	Moving Target	Captain Morrison	
1989	Gummibärchen küßt man nicht	Bischof	
1989	Laser Mission	Professor Braun	
1989	Jake Spanner, Private Eye	Sal Piccolo	
1990	Any Man's Death	Herr Gantz	
1990	Appearances	Emil Danzig	
1991	The Last Match	Coach	
1991	Tides of War	Doctor	
1991	Mountain of Diamonds	Ernie	
1992	Mistress	Himself	Cameo
1993	Tierärztin Christine	Dr. Gustav Gruber	
1993	Hunt for the Blue Diamond	Hans Kroger	
1994	Outlaws: The Legend of O.B. Taggart	Sheriff Laughton	
1995	Tierärztin Christine II: The Temptation	Dr. Gustav Gruber	
1995	Captiva Island	Arty	
1996	The Wild Bunch: An Album in Montage	Himself	Voice; Documentary
1996	All Dogs Go to Heaven 2	Carface Carruthers	Voice
1996	Merlin's Shop of Mystical Wonders	Grandfather	
1997	Ernest Borgnine on the Bus	Himself	Documentary
1997	McHale's Navy	Admiral Quinton McHale Sr.	Based on the series of the same name
1997	Gattaca	Caesar	
1998	Small Soldiers	Kip Killigan	Voice
1998	BASEketball	Ted Denslow	
1998	12 Bucks	Lucky	
1998	Mel	Grandpa	
1998	An All Dogs Christmas Carol	Carface Carruthers	Voice
1999	Abilene	Hotis Brown	
1999	The Lost Treasure of Sawtooth Island	Ben Quinn	
1999	The Last Great Ride	Franklin Lyle	
2000	Castle Rock	Nate	
2000	Hoover	J. Edgar Hoover	Also executive producer
2000	The Kiss of Debt	Godfather Mariano	
2002	11'09"01 September 11	Pensioner	Segment: "United States of America"
2002	Whiplash	Judge DuPont	
2003	The American Hobo	Narrator	Documentary
2003	The Long Ride Home	Lucas Moat	
2004	Blueberry	Rolling Star	
2004	Barn Red	Michael Bolini	
2004	The Trail to Hope Rose	Eugene	
2004	The Blue Light	Faerie King	
2005	That One Summer	Otis Garner	
2005	3 Below	Grandpa	
2005	Rail Kings	Steamtrain	
2006	The Bodyguard's Cure	Jerry Warden	
2007	Oliviero Rising	Bill	
2007	A Grandpa for Christmas	Bert O'Riley	
2008	Strange Wilderness	Milas	
2008	I Am Somebody: No Chance in Hell	Judge Holliday	
2008	Frozen Stupid	Frank Norgard	
2010	Enemy Mind	Command	Voice
2010	The Genesis Code	Carl Taylor	
2010	Red	Henry Britton / Recordskeeper	
2010	Another Harvest Moon	Frank	
2011	Night Club	Albert	
2011	The Lion of Judah	Slink	Voice
2011	Love's Christmas Journey	Nicolas	
2011	Snatched	Big Frank Baum	
2012	The Man Who Shook the Hand of Vicente Fernandez	Rex Page	final role

=== Television ===
Year	Title	Role	Notes
1951	Captain Video and His Video Rangers	Nargola	3 episodes
1951	Goodyear Playhouse	Sgt. Lenahan	Episode: "The Copper"
1951, 1952	The Philco Television Playhouse	Mathew O'Rourke	2 episodes
1954	The Lone Wolf	Saks	Episode: "The Avalanche Story (a.k.a. The Reno Story)"
1954	The Danny Thomas Show	Cop	Episode: "Rusty Runs Away"
1954	Ford Theatre	Gus White	Episode: "Night Visitor"
1954	Waterfront	Jack Bannion	2 episodes
1957	Navy Log	Host	Episode: "Human Bomb"
1957–61	Wagon Train	Willy Moran / Earl Packer / Estaban Zamora	4 episodes
1957, 1960	Dick Powell's Zane Grey Theatre	Willie / Big Jim Morrison	2 episodes
1959, 1960	Laramie	Boone Caudie / Major Prescott	2 episodes
1961	The Blue Angels	Unknown	Episode: "The Blue Leaders"
1962–1966	McHale's Navy	Lt. Commander Quinton McHale	4 seasons; 138 episodes
1966	Run for Your Life	Harry Martin	Episode: "Time and a Half on Christmas Eve"
1967	Get Smart	Guard, TV Viewer	2 episodes
1971	The Trackers	Sam Paxton	Television film
1973	Legend in Granite	Vince Lombardi	Television film
1974	Little House on the Prairie	Jonathan	Episode: "The Lord is my Shepherd"
1974	Twice in a Lifetime	Vince Lombardi	Television film
1976–1977	Future Cop	Cleaver	7 episodes
1977	Jesus of Nazareth	Roman Centurion	Miniseries
1977	Fire	Sam Brisbane	Television film
1978	The Ghost of Flight 401	Dom Cimoli	Television film
1979	All Quiet on the Western Front	Stanislaus Katczinsky	Television film
1982	Magnum, P.I.	Earl "Mr. White Death" Gianelli	Episode: "Mr. White Death"
1982	The Love Boat	Dominic Rosselli	Episode: "The Italian Cruise"
1983	Blood Feud	J. Edgar Hoover	Television film
1983	Masquerade	Jerry	Episode: "Pilot"
1983	Carpool	Mickey Doyle	Television film
1984	The Last Days of Pompeii	Marcus	Miniseries
1984	Love Leads the Way: A True Story	Senator Brighton	Television film
1984–1986	Airwolf	Dominic Santini	Main role (seasons 1–3)
1985	Alice in Wonderland	The Lion	Miniseries
1985	The Dirty Dozen: Next Mission	Major General Sam Worden	Television film
1986	Highway to Heaven	Guido Liggio	Episode: "Another Kind of War, Another Kind of Peace"
1987	Treasure Island in Outer Space	Billy Bones	
1987	The Dirty Dozen: The Deadly Mission	Major General Sam Worden	Television film
1987	Murder, She Wrote	Cosmo Ponzini	Episode: "Death Takes a Dive"
1988	The Dirty Dozen: The Fatal Mission	Major General Sam Worden	Television film
1989	Ocean	Pedro El Triste	Miniseries
1989	Jake Spanner, Private Eye	Sal Piccolo	Television film
1989	Jake and the Fatman	Col. Tom Cody	Episode: "My Shining Hour"
1992	Home Improvement	Eddie Phillips	Episode: "Birds of a Feather Flock to Taylor"
1993	The Simpsons	Himself	Voice, episode: "Boy-Scoutz 'n the Hood"
1993–1994	The Commish	Frank Nardino	2 episodes
1995–1997	The Single Guy	Manny	43 episodes
1996–1998	All Dogs Go to Heaven: The Series	Carface Caruthers	Voice, 6 episodes
1998	JAG	Artemus Sullivan	Episode: "Yesterday's Heroes"
1998	Pinky and the Brain	Father	Voice, episode: "The Third Mouse/The Visit"
1999	Early Edition	Antonio Birelli	Episode: "The Last Untouchable"
1999–2012	SpongeBob SquarePants	Mermaid Man	Voice, 17 episodes
2000	Walker, Texas Ranger	Eddie Ryan	Episode: "The Avenging Angel"
2002	Touched by an Angel	Max Blandish	Episode: "The Blue Angel"
2002	7th Heaven	Joe	Episode: "The Known Soldier"
2002	Family Law	Frank Collero	Episode: "Alienation of Affection"
2003	The District	Uncle Mike Murphy	Episode: "Last Waltz"
2004	The Trail to Hope Rose	Eugene	Television film
2007	A Grandpa for Christmas	Bert O'Riley	Television film
2009	ER	Paul Manning	Episodes: "Old Times" and "And in the End..."
2009	Aces 'N' Eights	Thurmond Prescott	Television film
2009	The Wishing Well	Big Jim	Television film
2010	Saturday Night Live	Himself	Episode: "Bryan Cranston/Kanye West", "What Up with That?" sketch
2011	Love's Christmas Journey	Nicholas	Television film

=== Theatre ===
Year	Title	Role	Playwright	Venue	Ref.
1952	Mrs. McThing	Nelson	Mary Chase	Martin Beck Theatre, Broadway	

=== Video games ===
Year	Title	Role	Notes	Ref.
2001	SpongeBob SquarePants: SuperSponge	Mermaid Man	Voice only	
2009	SpongeBob's Truth or Square	Mermaid Man	Voice only	
2010	SpongeBob's Boating Bash	Mermaid Man	Voice only	

== Awards and honors ==
Borgnine won the 1955 Academy Award for Best Actor for his portrayal of Marty Piletti in the film Marty. At the time of his death, he was the oldest living recipient of the Best Actor Oscar. For his contributions to the film industry, Borgnine received a motion pictures star on the Hollywood Walk of Fame in 1960. The star is located at 6324 Hollywood Boulevard. In 1998, the Palm Springs Walk of Stars dedicated a Golden Palm Star to Borgnine. He was honored with the Screen Actors Guild Life Achievement Award at the 17th Screen Actors Guild Awards, held January 30, 2011.

Borgnine's hometown of Hamden, Connecticut, where he enjoyed a large and vocal following, named a park and a small road in his honor. From 1972 to 2002, Borgnine marched in Milwaukee's annual Great Circus Parade as the "Grand Clown". In 1994, Borgnine received the Ellis Island Medal of Honor from the National Ethnic Coalition of Organizations. In 1996, he was inducted into the Hall of Great Western Performers at the National Cowboy & Western Heritage Museum in Oklahoma City.

In 2000, Borgnine received his 50-year pin as a Freemason in Abingdon Lodge No. 48, Abingdon, Virginia. He joined the Scottish Rite Valley of Los Angeles (in the Southern Jurisdiction of the U.S.A) in 1964, received the KCCH in 1979, was crowned a 33° Inspector General Honorary in 1983, and received the Grand Cross of the Court of Honour in 1991. He was also a member of the Loyal Order of Moose at that organization's Lodge in Junction City, Oregon. He volunteered to be Stories of Service National spokesman, urging his fellow World War II vets to come forward and share their stories.

In 2007, Borgnine was presented with California's highest civilian honor, the Commendation Medal.

Year	Award	Category	Title	Result	Ref.
1955	Academy Award	Best Actor in a Leading Role	Marty	Won	
1955	BAFTA Award	Best Foreign Actor	Marty	Won	
1955	Golden Globe Award	Best Actor – Motion Picture Drama	Marty	Won	
1955	National Board of Review Award	Best Actor	Marty	Won	
1955	New York Film Critics Circle Award	Best Actor	Marty	Won	
1959	Locarno International Film Festival	Best Actor	The Rabbit Trap	Won	
1962	Primetime Emmy Award	Outstanding Performance by an Actor in a Series (Lead)	McHale's Navy	Nominated	
1979	Primetime Emmy Award	Outstanding Supporting Actor in a Limited Series or a Special	All Quiet on the Western Front	Nominated	
1981	Golden Raspberry Award	Worst Supporting Actor	Deadly Blessing	Nominated	
1988	Independent Spirit Award	Best Supporting Male	Spike of Bensonhurst	Nominated	
1999	Daytime Emmy Award	Outstanding Performer in an Animated Program	All Dogs Go to Heaven: The Series	Nominated	
2007	Golden Globe Award	Best Actor in a Miniseries or Television Film	A Grandpa for Christmas	Nominated	
2009	Primetime Emmy Award	Outstanding Guest Actor in a Drama Series	ER: And in the End...	Nominated	
2009	Rhode Island International Film Festival	Lifetime Achievement Award		Won	
2011	Screen Actors Guild Award	Screen Actors Guild Life Achievement Award		Won	
