= Tony Packo's Cafe =

Restaurant in Toledo, Ohio, US

Coordinates: 41.659958°N 83.502223°W

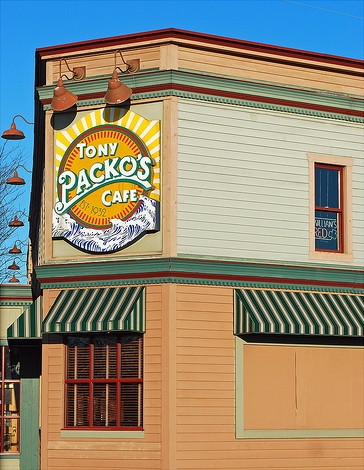
- Type: Restaurant
- Industry: Restaurant, pre-packaged foods
- Founded: 1932
- Founder: Tony Packo
- Headquarters: Toledo, Ohio, United States
- Number of locations: 4
- Owner: Emily Bennett
- Parent: TP Foods LLC
- Website: www.tonypackos.com

Tony Packo's Cafe is a restaurant chain rooted in the Hungarian neighborhood of Birmingham, on the east side of Toledo, Ohio, at 1902 Front Street. Founded in 1932, the restaurant became famous when it was mentioned in several episodes of the 1972–83 *M*A*S*H* television series. Dubbed "Toledo's most famous eatery" and "a Toledo institution," it is noted for its signature Hungarian Hot Dog sandwich and large collection of celebrity-signed hot dog buns displayed on its walls.

As of 2026, Tony Packo's operates as TP Foods LLC. It has four restaurant locations in the greater Toledo area and offers catering services. A Packo's line of packaged food products is sold in grocery and retail stores across the United States.

== History ==
Tony Packo was born in 1908 to Hungarian immigrant parents and was a native of Toledo's East Side. He learned the restaurant trade while working for at the Consaul Tavern, owned by his older brother John.

In 1932, during the Great Depression, Tony and his wife Rose used a $100 loan to open a small sandwich and ice cream shop. Three years later, the Packo family purchased the wedge-shaped (flatiron-style) building that held the former Consaul Tavern at the corner of Front and Consaul Streets, next to the Maumee River. This building became home to what is today the Original Tony Packo's Restaurant.

In 1935, Tony Packo trademarked his signature dish: the "Hungarian Hot Dog". The sandwich features a Hungarian sausage called kolbász, similar to Polish kielbasa, served sliced in half on rye bread with spicy chili sauce.

When Tony became seriously ill in 1962, his daughter Nancy Packo Horvath took over operations. Tony Packo died the following year at the age of 55. His son Tony Packo Jr. joined the company in 1968 at the age of 20, and the siblings led growth in the late 1960s.

Actor Burt Reynolds visited Toledo in 1972, while starring in a local production of The Rainmaker, he stopped at Packo's on the suggestion of Tony's daughter, Nancy. Reynolds became the first celebrity to sign a hot dog bun at the restaurant, inadvertently beginning a tradition that has continued for over five decades. The collection, known as the "Bun Wall of Fame", has grown to include signatures from presidents, actors, musicians, and astronauts. Today, the autographs are placed on foam airbrushed replicas of the original buns and displayed on the walls of Packo's restaurants.

The company entered the packaged food business in 1980, when Merco Foods agreed to distribute a line of pickles under the Packo's family brand.

=== Sale ===
In October 2011, Robert G. Bennett purchased Tony Packo's, Inc. for $5.5 million in a court-ordered sale. Bennett died in May 2013.

In October 2019, the chain opened two concept stores inside Kroger grocery locations in Perrysburg, Ohio and Holland, Ohio.

Tony Packo's celebrated its 90th anniversary in 2022, marking nine decades of operation.

In 2026, Tony Packo's was named a featured stop on the Lake Erie to Ohio River Trail, part of America 250-Ohio's "Trails & Tales" program, a scenic driving route celebrating Ohio's waterways and connecting more than 150 historic sites across the state.

== In popular culture ==
Tony Packo's Cafe gained fame through M*A*S*H, a 1972–1983 television series whose character Corporal Maxwell Klinger, portrayed by Toledo native Jamie Farr, mentioned the restaurant as his favorite eatery. Tony Packo's was mentioned in six episodes:

- "The Interview" (Season 4, 1976): Klinger tells interviewer Clete Roberts, "Incidentally, if you're ever in Toledo, Ohio, on the Hungarian side of town, Tony Packo's, greatest Hungarian hot dogs, with chili peppers, 35 cents, and a cold beer!"
- "The Grim Reaper" (Season 6, 1977): Klinger and wounded soldier Private Danker share memories of Toledo, and Danker later sends Klinger a care package of Packo's hot dogs and chili peppers.
- "Dear Sis" (Season 7, 1978): Klinger describes a dream involving an endless chain of Packo's Hungarian hot dogs.
- "Dreams" (Season 8, 1980): The only visual appearance of the restaurant in the series; Klinger dreams he is walking through a deserted Toledo and peers through the shop window. The scene was filmed on a set, though the address shown — 1902 Front Street — is accurate.
- "A War for All Seasons" (Season 9, 1980): The 4077th unit orders sausage casings from Tony Packo's to use in a makeshift blood-filtering machine.
- "Goodbye, Farewell and Amen" (Season 11, 1983): In the two-and-a-half-hour series finale, Klinger says of Toledo: "I'd give anything to be back in Toledo. Sitting in Packo's with the guys, having a beer and eating a dog while the chili sauce drips down your arm..."

The Original Tony Packo's restaurant displays M*A*S*H memorabilia on its premises, including the prop box used for the sausage casings in "A War for All Seasons."

== Operations ==
Tony Packo's operates four restaurant locations in the greater Toledo area, as well as catering services.

- The Original Tony Packo's | 1902 Front Street
- Packo's Sylvania | 5822 Alexis Rd., Sylvania, Ohio
- Packo's Secor | 3348 Secor Rd., Toledo
- Packo's Maumee | 1399 Conant St., Maumee, Ohio

Tony Packo's manufactures and distributes nationwide a line of packaged food products under the Packo's Foods brand. Products include:

- Hungarian Hot Dogs (kolbász sausage)
- Chili with Beans
- Sweet Hot Pickles and other pickle varieties
- Hot Dog Sauce

A corporate office is located at 1902 Front Street and an online distribution warehouse for UPS and corporate gift orders is in Waterville, Ohio.

== See also ==
- Coney Island hot dog

== Notes ==
=== Bibliography ===
- Canto, George (1995). Pop Culture Landmarks (Hardcover). Farmington Hills, Michigan: Gale Research. pp. 212–213. ISBN 9780810393998.
- Fodor's (2003). Fodor's USA, 28th Edition (Paperback). United Kingdom: Fodor's Travel Publications. p. 731. ISBN 9781400010882.
- Hufnagle, Bill (2009). Biker Billy's Roadhouse Cookbook. n.p.: Rowman & Littlefield, Lyons Press. p. 99. ISBN 9781599216935.
- Kelby, Nicole M. (2009). A Travel Guide for Reckless Hearts Stories (Paperback). Borealis Books. p. 140. ISBN 9780873517676.
- Traylor, Jeff; Traylor, Nadean Disabato (May 1998). The Great Ohio Roundabout: Circle Tour of Ohio Towns and Country Along Scenic and Historic Highways (Paperback). Papillon Press. pp. 164–165. ISBN 9780941467087.
- Wood, Andrew F. (2003). Road Trip America: A State-by-state Tour Guide to Offbeat Destinations (Paperback). United States: Collectors Press. p. 79. ISBN 9781888054743.
- Zenfell, Martha Ellen, ed. (November 6, 2000). United States on the Road. Insight Guides. Singapore: Langenscheidt Publishers Incorporated, Ingram Publishing Services. p. 126. ISBN 9780887293696.
- Zimmermann, George; Zimmermann, Carol (2009). Ohio Off the Beaten Path (12th ed.). p. 187. ISBN 978-0-7627-5051-1.
- Zurcher, Neil (April 1995). Neil Zurcher's Favorite One Tank Trips and Tales from the Road (Paperback). Gray, Publishers. p. 104. ISBN 9781886228016.
- Zurcher, Neil (2008). Ohio Oddities: A Guide to the Curious Attractions of the Buckeye State. Grey and Company. p. 59. ISBN 9781598510478.

=== Further reading ===
- Barber, Katherine, ed. (2004). Canadian Oxford Dictionary (2nd. ed.). Toronto: Oxford University Press. ISBN 0-19-541816-6.
- Christoff, Chris (April 1, 2014). "Detroit’s Coney Island Hot Dogs Are Edible Solace for City". Bloomberg.
- DeWitt, Dave; Evans, Chuck (1996). The Hot Sauce Bible (Paperback). United States: Crossing Press. ISBN 9780895947604.
- Jakle, John A.; Sculle, Keith A. (1999). Fast Food. Baltimore: The Johns Hopkins University Press. ISBN 0-8018-6109-8..
- Levine, Ed (May 25, 2005). "It's All in How the Dog Is Served". The New York Times..
- Lindlar, Charlie (April 11, 2012). "Pizza Hut To Pioneer New Hot Dog-Stuffed Crust In UK Branches". Huffington Post (United Kingdom).
- Varricchio, Taryn; Raucheisen, Nicole (December 7, 2019). "How Nathan's Famous turned one hot dog stand on Coney Island into a household name". Business Insider. Business Insider.
- Yung, Katherine and Joe Grimm (2012). Coney Detroit. Detroit, Michigan: Wayne State University Press. ISBN 9780814337189.
