= A Grandpa for Christmas =

- Genre: Comedy drama
- Written by: David Alexander
- Directed by: Harvey Frost
- Starring: Ernest Borgnine; Juliette Goglia; Katherine Helmond; Richard Libertini; Tracy Nelson
- Music by: David Lawrence
- Country of origin: United States
- Original language: English

Production
- Executive producers: Robert Halmi Jr. Larry Levinson
- Producers: Erik Olson; Brian J. Gordon
- Cinematography: Brian Stanley
- Editor: Jennifer Jean Cacavas
- Running time: 90 minutes
- Production companies: RHI Entertainment; Larry Levinson Productions

Original release
- Network: Hallmark Channel
- Release: November 24, 2007

A Grandpa for Christmas is a 2007 American made-for-television comedy-drama film starring Ernest Borgnine and Juliette Goglia. It premiered on Hallmark Channel on November 24, 2007.

== Plot ==
Bertram "Bert" O'Riley is a retired Hollywood actor who has been estranged from his former wife, Brenda, and only daughter Marie for decades. Despite this, Bert keeps busy with his many friends from show business and his days are mostly spent playing chess with his former agent and best friend, Karl Sugarman, and getting coffee with Karl, Adam, Jack, and Roxie. Bert is considering selling his home and moving into a retirement home, but little does he know, Marie has moved to Los Angeles with her 10-year-old daughter, Rebecca, whom Bert has never met.

Marie ends up in a severe car accident and is hospitalized for a coma. Social Services places Becca in Bert's care, but Becca, having been told by her grandmother that Bert left the family because he did not want to raise a child, is resentful of Bert despite his best efforts to connect with the girl. During a thunderstorm, Bert comforts the scared Becca and sings her a Welsh lullaby that puts her to sleep.

Roxie encourages Becca to audition for the Christmas pageant at her new school, and she agrees. Roxie offers to help her with singing, and suggests that she reach out to Bert for help as well. While playing chess with Kurt and Bert, Kurt reveals to Becca that Bert actually used to teach drama at Glendale College and directed many successful musicals. As she had been told by her grandmother that Bert could not sing or dance, Becca begins to realize that what she had been told about him was wrong, and asks Bert to help her with her dancing. After a successful audition, Becca gets the part in the musical with a solo number.

Marie wakes up from her coma and asks to see Bert, and she thanks him for taking care of Becca. However, relations between the two are still strained. Becca attempts to tell Marie about how Bert is not a bad man, but Marie tells her to be careful, because he was not there for her or her mother when they needed him. Becca gets angry and says that Bert was there for her and leaves the room. Karl, who witnessed the break-up between Brenda and Bert, suggests that Bert tell Marie and Becca the truth about what happened, but Bert claims that he does not want to ruin Brenda's memory, as she died three years prior.

As an early Christmas present, Bert gives Becca an iPod Nano, something her friend, Heather, had gotten previously. Becca is so excited that she calls him "grandpa" for the first time. Soon after, the pageant director has to leave for a family matter, and Becca suggests that Bert direct the pageant instead. Bert agrees and spends several days training the students for the production with the help of Roxie and Adam. Things are going well until Bert suffers a sudden heart attack. While Bert is in the hospital, Karl finally tells Marie the truth: Brenda left Bert on Christmas Eve for a director named Russell who promised to make her famous. Soon, Russell left the two and when Bert would not take her back, Brenda took the three year-old Marie to San Francisco in retaliation. Skeptical, Marie claims that Bert never helped out financially, but Karl reveals that Bert paid for her entire college tuition.

On Christmas Eve, Bert checks out of the hospital early so he can see Becca's performance in person. His doctor warns him that it could be harmful to his heart, but he assures her that if he isn't there to see Becca's performance, that his heart would be broken anyway. Becca is suffering from stage fright and is nervous about performing in front of a large crowd, but Bert helps her overcome her fears and the performance is a success. Back at Bert's home, there is a small celebration. Marie tells Bert that she wants to move into his house while she recovers so they can make up for lost time. Bert gladly agrees and she calls him "dad" for the first time in his life. With the family reunited, the three go join the party, with Bert preparing to celebrate his first Christmas in decades.

== Cast ==
- Ernest Borgnine as Bert O'Riley
- Katherine Helmond as Roxie Famosa
- Juliette Goglia as Becca O'Riley
- Richard Libertini as Karl Sugarman
- Tracy Nelson as Marie O'Riley
- Jamie Farr as Adam Johnson
- Quinn Redeker as Jack Fast
- Justine Dorsey as Ashley Gee
- Timilee Romolini as Christine Rogers
- Tom Virtue as George Rogers
- Kelsey Lewis as Heather Rogers
- K.T. Thangavelu as Dr. Burney

== Production ==
David N. Lawrence wrote A Christmas Song, the song that Becca sings at the recital.

== Reception ==
In prime time, the film led the network to rank #1 in the time period, #1 for the weekend, and #4 for the week. It also became the third-highest-ever-rated original movie premiere on Hallmark Channel to the premiere date. At the age of 90, Ernest Borgnine received a Golden Globe nomination for his performance. The Dove Foundation gave A Grandpa for Christmas the Dove Family Approved Seal on November 6, 2007.

== See also ==
- List of Christmas films
