= Jamie Farr =

American actor and comedian (born 1934)

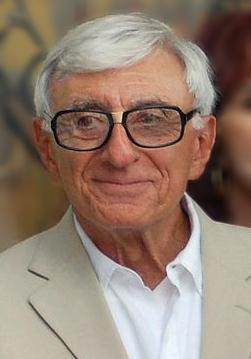
- Farr at the Hollywood Walk of Fame in September 2012
- Born: Jameel Joseph Farah; July 1, 1934 (age 92); Toledo, Ohio, U.S.
- Occupations: Actor; comedian
- Years active: 1955–present
- Known for: Playing Klinger on M*A*S*H
- Spouse: Joy Ann Richards (m. 1963)
- Children: 2
- Military career
- Allegiance: United States
- Branch: Special Services
- Service years: 1957–1959
- Website: jamiefarr.com (2006 archive)

Jamie Farr (born Jameel Joseph Farah; July 1, 1934) is an American comedian and actor. He is best known for playing Sergeant Maxwell Klinger, a soldier who tried to get discharged from the army by cross-dressing, on the CBS sitcom M*A*S*H. After M*A*S*H, Farr reprised the role of Klinger for AfterMASH and appeared both in small roles on popular shows such as The Love Boat and as a host or panelist on game shows including Battle of the Network Stars. He was inducted into the Hollywood Walk of Fame in 1985.

== Early life ==
Farr was born Jameel Joseph Farah (Arabic: جميل جوزيف فرح) on July 1, 1934, in Toledo, Ohio, the son of Jameila (Arabic: جميله فرح) and Samuel Farah (Arabic: صموئيل ينحت). His father, who owned a grocery store, was an immigrant from the Beqaa Valley area of what is now Lebanon and his mother, a seamstress, was a first-generation Lebanese American who grew up in Iowa. Prior to immigrating through Ellis Island, Samuel's surname was Abboud and his father's first name was Farah. Farr grew up in Northern Toledo, which had a sizable Lebanese population, in a diverse neighborhood, with his family belonging to the Antiochian Orthodox church. He had at least one sibling, an older sister, Yvonne, who died in 2012.

His first acting gig was at age 11, when he won two dollars in a local acting competition. While in high school, he worked at his father's shop and delivered The Toledo Times newspaper in the morning and The Blade in the afternoon. He graduated from Woodward High School in 1952 and left for California later that year, where he attended classes at Pasadena Playhouse. It was there that he was spotted by an MGM talent scout and offered a screen test for the film Blackboard Jungle, where he played the role of Santini. He was credited as Jameel Farah, as he would not take on the name Jamie Farr until 1959, after his stint in the army.

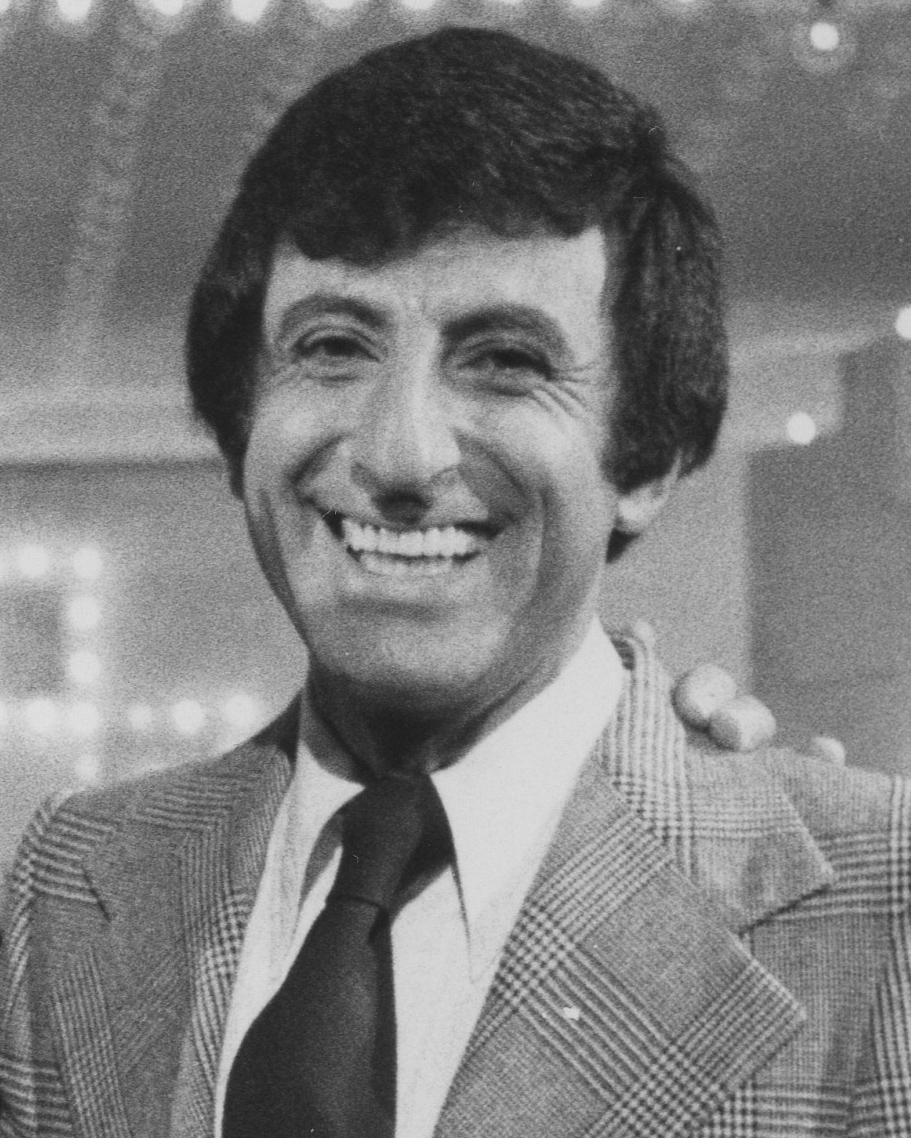
On the game show Stumpers!, 1976

== Career ==
While training at Pasadena Playhouse, Farr acted in bit parts including a role in Blackboard Jungle (1955) for Metro-Goldwyn-Mayer. He also worked at a chinchilla farm for extra money. Sherwood Schwartz noticed Farr on an unsold TV pilot and cast him on The Red Skelton Show in 1955, where he played Snorkel, whose large nose gave him an inhumanly strong sense of smell. He became a regular on Skelton. He was drafted in 1957, and underwent basic training at Fort Ord in California He was made a Broadcast Specialist and worked on training videos in various roles at Fort Knox, the Army Pictorial Service, and Fort Huachuca before shipping out to Korea. Abroad, he was part of the Special Services and worked on the Far East Network. When Red Skelton traveled to Japan and Korea to do a USO tour, he requested Farr's service as his assistant.

After two years of active duty, Farr returned to the United States, where he spent an additional two years on reserve. Shortly after his return, his father died and he decided to give up acting to help provide steady financial support for his mother. When Farr went to say goodbye to Skelton, Skelton handed him a stack of one hundred dollar bills to send home and told Farr he was hiring him as a writer. Farr completed his military career with an additional two years on inactive reserve.

Over the next decade, Farr had small roles on The Danny Kaye Show, The Dick Van Dyke Show, My Three Sons and Garrison's Gorillas and appeared in films, including: The Greatest Story Ever Told, No Time for Sergeants, Who's Minding the Mint? and With Six You Get Eggroll. In October 1972, he was hired for one day's work on the fourth episode of M*A*S*H as Corporal Maxwell Klinger. Klinger provided comic relief in his desperate attempts to be given a Section 8 discharge by wearing elaborate women's outfits with accessories such as boas, a fruit hat, and fashion headscarves. At the time, Farr was still a struggling actor and was most concerned about the $250 paycheck from the M*A*S*H job so he could buy groceries and pay rent; he never expected to be invited back for several more episodes. For several years, the producers and the studio dodged his requests for a contract, which Farr suspected was so they didn't have to increase his salary. He was finally hired as a series regular on M*A*S*H beginning with season 4 in 1975.

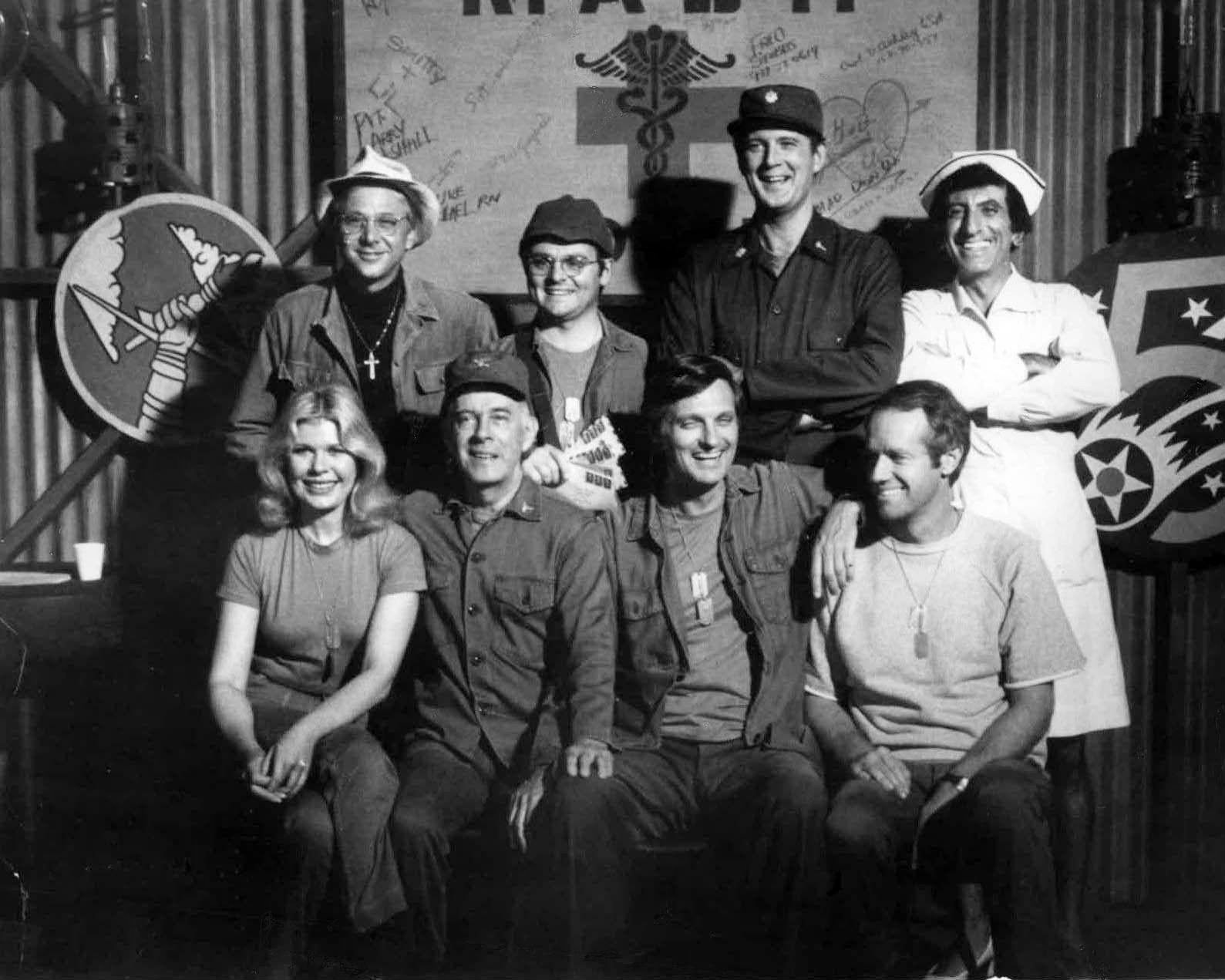
Cast of M*A*S*H (1977)

Like Farr, the character of Klinger was a Lebanese-American from Toledo, which gave Farr the freedom to pepper references about the town into his dialogue. He frequently mentioned hot dogs from Tony Packo's Cafe and was a fan of the baseball team, the Toledo Mud Hens. Klinger was promoted to the company clerk's position later in the series and gradually stopped wearing women's clothes. This was done for two reasons: first, to show Klinger's respect for his new role and his increased maturity; and second, because Farr didn't want his two young children to be teased about their father wearing dresses on TV. By the end of the show, only Alan Alda, who played Hawkeye Pierce, and Loretta Swit, who played Margaret "Hot Lips" Houlihan, had appeared in more M*A*S*H episodes than Farr. Farr was also the sole cast member who had actually served in Korea, and the dog tags he wore as Klinger were his own from his time in the service.

During the late 1970s, Farr appeared regularly as one of the celebrity judges on The Gong Show. He also made frequent guest appearances on several other game shows, including Battle of the Network Stars, The $100,000 Pyramid, Super Password, and Body Language. He also attempted game show hosting with Oddball, an updated version of Get the Message for NBC. However, the pilot did not get picked up. Following the end of M*A*S*H in 1983, Farr, Harry Morgan, and William Christopher reprised their roles for two seasons on the spinoff show AfterMASH, which followed their characters after the end of the war. Between the 1970s and 1990s, he appeared in several made-for-TV movies such as Murder Can Hurt You, Return of the Rebels, and Combat Academy and guest starred on shows including Kolchak: The Night Stalker, Emergency!, The Love Boat, Murder She Wrote, Diagnosis: Murder, and Mad About You. He played the Sheik in The Cannonball Run (1981), Cannonball Run II (1984) and Speed Zone (1989), and was the only actor to have appeared in all three Cannonball Run films. He also appeared in TV commercials, including for Wonder Bread, Mars bars, and IBM computers.

Farr's debut on Broadway was as Nathan Detroit in Guys and Dolls in the 1990s at age 60. He had wanted to play this role since seeing the show in high school. He replaced Nathan Lane in the role at the last minute, only having two weeks and one full-cast rehearsal before the show opened. In 1997, he played Oscar Madison opposite former M*A*S*H costar William Christopher as Felix Unger in The Odd Couple. The two had appeared in several movies before being cast together in M*A*S*H. He also appeared in Flamingo Court opposite Anita Gillette. His other shows have included Say Goodnight, Gracie, The Last Romance, George Washington Slept Here, Catch Me If You Can, Don't Dress for Dinner, Lend Me a Tenor, Tuesdays with Morrie, and Oklahoma!.

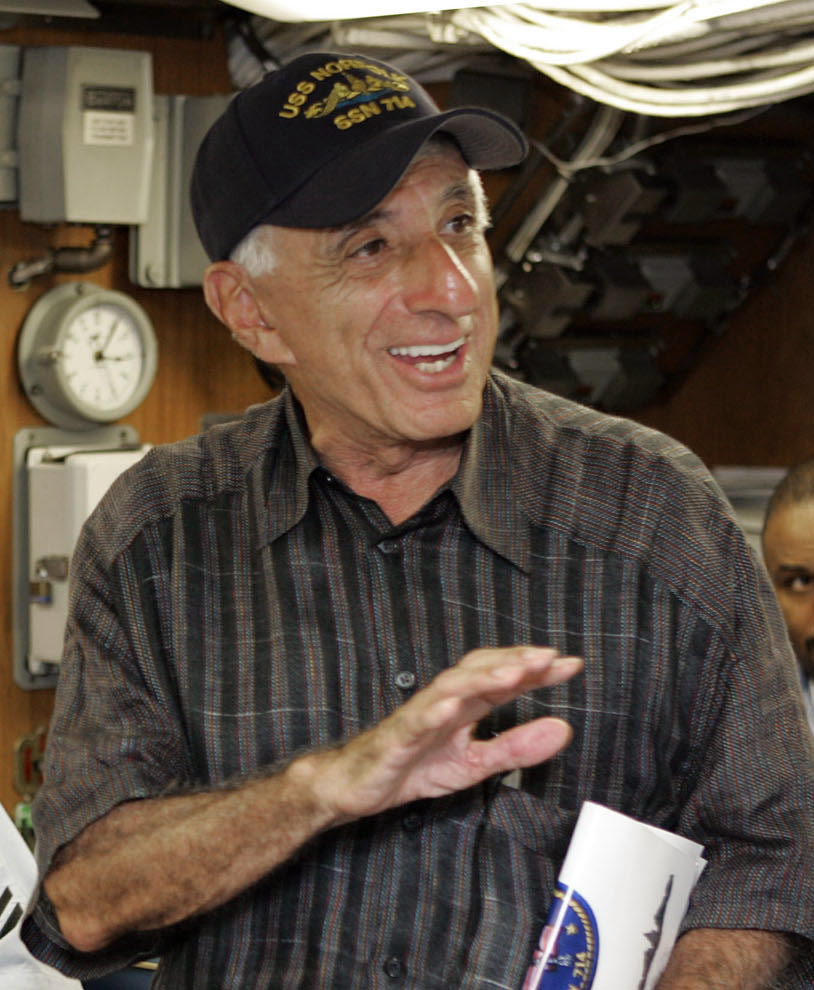
Farr in September 2007

Between 2007 and 2008, Farr, Chuck Woolery, and Bob Eubanks were rotating hosts of the $250,000 Game Show Spectacular at the Las Vegas Hilton. He also hosted a daily radio travel feature called Travelin' Farr. On Memorial Day 2007, Farr hosted a multiple-episode run of M*A*S*H on the Hallmark Channel where he provided commentary during commercial breaks. Between 2016 and 2018, he promoted M*A*S*H and other classic television series on MeTV and in 2022 was attending large-scale events like Comic Con to meet fans of the show. The same year, he hosted M*A*S*H: The Best By Farr, where he provided commentary on his favorite episodes of the show to celebrate the show's 50th anniversary. Farr published his autobiography Just Farr Fun (ISBN 978-0964077508) in 1994 and cowrote Hababy's Christmas Eve (ISBN 978-1934341100) a book based on a story told by Klinger about a family of camels who brought the Wise Men to baby Jesus in his manger, with his wife in 2003.

Farr collapsed during a dinner show in Edmonton in 2014 and was transported to the hospital. He finished out the week of shows until an understudy was found, then flew home to California, where he had a stent put into his heart to treat atherosclerosis. In October 2015, he collapsed again while rehearsing for Jack of Diamonds at Theatre Aquarius in Hamilton, Ontario, and his understudy, Ian D. Clark, stepped into the role. Farr then decided to retire from acting on stage.

== Personal life ==
Farr met his wife Joy Ann Richards, a model, shortly after returning from military service. They married in 1963 and have two children, Jonas (c. 1969) and Yvonne (c. 1972). In 2021, Farr told We Are the Mighty that James Jabara was his cousin.

Farr was very close to Red Skelton, describing him as his "hero" and "mentor", and like "a second father" to him. He shared that Skelton was one of his favorite comedians growing up. Before Farr left for his military service, Skelton gave him a Saint Christopher medal, which he has worn since. When Skelton died in 1997, his widow asked Farr to be a pallbearer at his funeral.

Public records show that Farr has contributed financially to the Republican National Committee and Republican Party candidates multiple times since 1988, including to the campaigns of Darrell Issa (2022), who grew up in Ohio and is of Lebanese ancestry, and Joe Leibham (2009).

== Legacy and honors ==
Farr has remained deeply loyal to his hometown of Toledo, Ohio, and the city has returned the sentiment. In 1977, he was awarded Toledo's version of the Keys to the City, a ceremonial glass. Scott High School named their new performing arts wing after him the same year. The University of Toledo awarded him an honorary doctorate in 1983 and, in 1998, a park where Farr spent a lot of his childhood was renamed the Jamie Farr Park, something he has referred to as "a highlight of my life and career." Tony Packo's Cafe, a restaurant referenced several times by Klinger on M*A*S*H, displays a hot dog bun signed by Farr at their establishment. In 2017, Farr and Klinger were the first two inductees to the Toledo Mud Hens' Celebrity Hall of Fame. In 2023, an artist erected Jumpin' Jamie, a fiberglass frog statue part of a larger public art piece. The frog is named after Farr and is dressed in a babushka and red lipstick in homage to Klinger. Originally at the Highland Meadows Golf Club, where the Jamie Farr Toledo Classic was held, it is now kept at Bittersweet Farms. There is also an academic scholarship bearing his name through the Greater Toledo Community Foundation.

In 1983, Judd Silverman approached Farr about "lending his name" to a golf tournament. The following year, the "Jamie Farr Toledo Classic", an annual LPGA tour stop, held its inaugural event in Sylvania, Ohio. Sponsored by Kroger, Owens Corning, and O-I Glass, the tournament raises money for children's charities, including the Boys and Girls Clubs of America. Farr hosted the event for 28 years until it was rebranded the Marathon Classic in 2012. As of 2023, it is called the Dana Open.

Outside of Ohio, Farr has been nominated for an Emmy for his time on M*A*S*H, given the Comedy Achievement Honoree award at the New York Arab-American Comedy Festival, and inducted into the Boys and Girls Clubs of America Alumni Hall of Fame. In 1985, he received a star on the Hollywood Walk of Fame. Two of the dresses he wore as Klinger had previously been worn by Ginger Rogers and Betty Grable and are now owned by the Smithsonian National Museum of American History. In 2001, he received the Ellis Island Medal of Honor from the National Ethnic Coalition of Organizations and in 2016 was given the Arab American Institute Foundation's Special Recognition Award.

== Select filmography ==
=== Television ===
Year	Title	Role	Notes	Ref
1955–1961	The Red Skelton Show	Snorkel		
1959–1961	The Rebel	Theodore (1959), Pooch (1961)	Appeared in "Panic" (1959) and "Two Weeks" (1961)	
1961	The Dick Van Dyke Show	Restaurant delivery boy	Season 1, episodes 4, 5, 8, 11, and 12	
1962–1964	Hazel	Counterman (1962), Antonio (1964)	Episodes "Barney Hatfield, Where Are You?" and "Let's Get Away from It All"	
1963	The Danny Kaye Show	Hans, Court Reporter, Player		
1965	Burke's Law	Zava, Lineman, Clinic Informant	Season 3, episode 15: "A Very Important Russian Is Missing"	
1965–1968	Gomer Pyle, U.S.M.C.	USMC Sergeant (1966), Special effects man (1968)	Episodes "Gomer Pyle POW" and "A Star is Not Born"	
1965–1966	My Favorite Martian	Hospital orderly (1965), jewel thief (1966)	Episodes "Virus M for Martian" and "The Avenue C Mob"	
1966	The Lucy Show		Episode "Lucy, the Rain Goddess"	
1966	I Dream of Jeannie	Achmed	Episode "Get Me to Mecca on Time"	
1966	F Troop	Lackey (uncredited), Standup Bull	Season 1, episodes "Our Hero. What's His Name?" and "Too Many Cooks Spoil the Troop"	
1966	The Andy Griffith Show	Gracos	Season 6, episode 23	
1967	Death Valley Days	Dick Gird	Season 15, episode 15: "Silver Tombstone"	
1967–1968	Garrison's Gorillas	Pablo (1967), Tony Marcello (1968)		
1968	Get Smart	Musician	Season 4, episode 1: "The Impossible Mission	
1969	The Flying Nun	Police officer	Episode "Cast Your Bread Upon the Waters"	
1969	Family Affair	Hippie	Season 3, Episode 27: "Flower Power"	
1971	The Chicago Teddy Bears	Duke, Lefty	11 episodes	
1972–1973	Emergency!	Alan Austen	Season 2, episodes "Helpful" and "Boot"	
1972–1983	M*A*S*H	Maxwell Klinger	216 episodes	
1973	Inch High, Private Eye	Voices	13 episodes	
1974–1978, 1982–1984	Tattletales	Himself with wife Joy	30 episodes	
1975	Barnaby Jones	Marty Paris	Season 3, episode 20: "Doomed Alibi"	
1975	Kolchak: The Night Stalker	Jack Burton	Season 1, episode 13	
1977–1979	Battle of the Network Stars	Himself		
1977–1984	Circus of the Stars	Himself		
1978–1983	The Love Boat	Seymour (1978), Inspector Akhmed Sadu (1982), Art Fuller (1983)	Episode in seasons 1, 6, and 7	
1981	The Fall Guy	Himself	Season 1, episode 7: "Japanese Connection"	
1983–1985	AfterMASH	Maxwell Klinger	M*A*S*H spinoff; 30 episodes	
1987	Wordplay	Himself	Guest host	
1988	Murder She Wrote	Theo Wexler	Season 5, Episode 2: "A Little Night Work"	
1998	Diagnosis: Murder		Season 5, episode 15: "Drill for Death"	
1999	Mad About You	Dry Cleaner	Season 7, episode 16: "Millennium Bug"	
2002–2003	That '70s Show		Two episodes	
2007	Family Guy	Himself	Episode "Believe It or Not, Joe's Walking on Air"	
2016	Bella and the Bulldogs	Ernie	Episode "Bad Grandma"	
2018–2019	The Cool Kids	Dudley	6 episodes	

=== Film ===
Year	Title	Role	Ref
1955	Blackboard Jungle	Santini	
1958	No Time for Sergeants	Lt. Gardelli	
1965	The Greatest Story Ever Told	Thaddeus	
1967	Who's Minding the Mint?	Mario	
1968	With Six You Get Eggroll	Jo Jo	
1973	The Blue Knight	Yasser Hafiz	
1981	The Cannonball Run	The Sheik	
1981	Return of the Rebels	Mickey Fine	
1984	Cannonball Run II	The Sheik	
1986	Happy Hour	Crummy Fred	
1988	Scrooged	Himself	
1989	Speed Zone	The Sheik	
2007	A Grandpa for Christmas	Adam Johnson	

== Books ==
- Farr, Jamie (with Robert Blair Kaiser) (1994). Just Farr Fun. Eubanks/Donizetti Inc. ISBN 978-0964077508.
- Farr, Jamie & Joy (2003). Hababy's Christmas Eve. Publishamerica Inc. ISBN 978-1592864867.
