= Circle of Violence: A Family Drama =

1986 American television movie

- Tuesday Weld and Geraldine Fitzgerald
- Genre: Drama
- Written by: William Wood
- Directed by: David Greene
- Starring: Tuesday Weld; Geraldine Fitzgerald; Peter Bonerz; River Phoenix; Philip Sterling; Zoaunne Leroy; Ellen Travolta; Sue Giosa
- Music by: Gil Mellé
- Country of origin: United States
- Original language: English

Production
- Executive producers: Bill Finnegan; Patricia Finnegan
- Producers: Sheldon Pinchuk; Deborah Moore; Gerald Rafshoon
- Cinematography: Stevan Larner
- Editor: David Campling
- Running time: 90 minutes
- Production companies: Lorimar Television; Telepictures Productions

Original release
- Network: CBS
- Release: October 12, 1986

Circle of Violence: A Family Drama (also known as Circle of Violence: A Family on the Edge or simply Circle of Violence) is a 1986 CBS television movie. Directed by David Greene and starring Tuesday Weld, Geraldine Fitzgerald, Peter Bonerz and River Phoenix, the film tells the tragic story of the seldom addressed issue of elder parent abuse.

== Synopsis ==
Georgia Benfield is at a difficult place in her life; her husband, Pete, has left her for a younger woman, her teenage son, Chris, is unmanageable, and she's struggling financially when her widowed mother, Charlotte, moves in. Amid juggling a new full-time job, raising two children, and her failing marriage, the constant bickering between mother and daughter continues as it has ever since Georgia was a child.

Finally, at her wit's end, Georgia loses control and begins physically abusing her elderly mother, just as Georgia had been abused herself as a child. As family and friends slowly begin to learn of the abuse, and long buried family secrets come to light, both mother and daughter must learn to accept the past, to change what is happening at present, in order to face a better future.

== Cast ==
- Tuesday Weld as Georgia Benfield
- Geraldine Fitzgerald as Charlotte Kessling
- Peter Bonerz as Pete Benfield
- River Phoenix as Chris Benfield
- Philip Sterling as Jim McLane
- Zoaunne LeRoy as Florence McLane
- Ellen Travolta as Marion
- Sue Giosa as Dr. Kalmeir
- Christina Maria Hutter as Addie Benfield
- Bradley Lieberman as Mark
- Jeanette Miller as Woman Singer
- Adele Gilbert as Mrs. Edwards

== Awards ==
Awards
Year	Award	Category	Recipient(s)	Result	Ref.
1986–1987	Young Artist Award	Best Television Family Special, Movie of the Week or Variety Show	Circle of Violence	Nominated	
1986–1987	Young Artist Award	Best Young Actress in a Family Special, Movie of the Week or Variety Show	Christina Maria Hutter	Nominated	
1987	Retirement Research Foundation; Wise Owl Award	Television and Theatrical Film Fiction	Sheldon Pinchuk; Bill Finnegan; Patricia Finnegan; Deborah Moore; Gerald Rafshoon	Honorable mention	
