= Tova Borgnine =

American businesswoman (1941–2022)

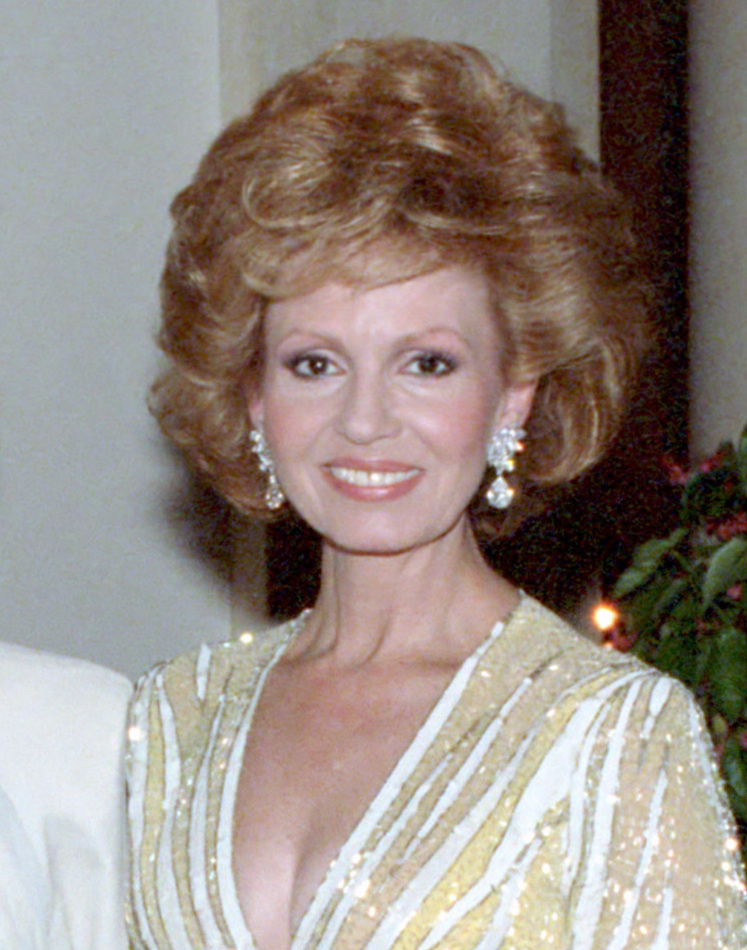
- Borgnine in 1987
- Born: Tove Træsnæs; November 17, 1941; Oslo, Norway
- Died: February 26, 2022 (aged 80); Chester County, Pennsylvania, U.S.
- Occupation: Businesswoman
- Years active: 1965–2022
- Spouses: Louis Littleton (m. 1965; div. 1972) Ernest Borgnine (m. 1973; died 2012)
- Children: 1

Tova Traesnaes Borgnine (born Tove Træsnæs; November 17, 1941 – February 26, 2022) was a Norwegian-born American businesswoman. She was the founder of Beauty by Tova cosmetics and the wife of Hollywood actor Ernest Borgnine.

== Early life ==
Tova was born in Oslo, Norway; her father was a graphic artist and her mother was a translator at the U.S. Embassy. Following her parents' divorce, she moved to the United States with her mother, at age 7; though she did not speak English at the time.

== Career ==
Tova studied acting in Manhattan, but she developed a fondness for applying makeup. After marrying a New Jersey businessman in 1965, she opened a makeup center. When the marriage failed, she moved her business to Las Vegas to be near her mother.

In Las Vegas, in 1975, Tova learned of a cactus-based face cream made from a formula by a Mexican family and bought worldwide distribution rights. By 1977, the revenues for her company, then called Tova9, were about $500,000; by 1981, they were nearly $2 million. In 1984, she published The Tova Difference: A Promise of Lasting Beauty, with Elaine Trebek.

Her perfume, Tova Signature, has been produced since 1983, and sold on QVC since 1990. By 1984, her firm had 47 employees at her offices in Beverly Hills, California, and factory in nearby Arcadia. By 1987, she had 65 skincare products and 80 employees.

According to QVC, as of 2001 her perfumes made her "a steady presence at QVC and its biggest fragrance vendor".

In 2002, QVC bought the Tova brand for a seven-figure sum. As of 2008, Tova Signature was QVC’s top-selling perfume.

She was awarded the FiFi Award for the Women's Fragrance Star of the Year (Non-Store Venues) in 1998. Her fragrance, Tova Signature, was nominated for the 2008 Fragrance Hall of Fame FiFi Award.

In June 2009, she received the Retailer of the Year award from the Fragrance Foundation, both for her innovative use of direct marketing to sell her products and for her longevity in the fragrance industry.

== Personal life ==
Borgnine was married twice. Her first husband was Louis A. Littleton of Point Pleasant, New Jersey. The marriage ended in divorce in 1972 after seven years. She had one son, David Johnson, born out of wedlock. She married actor Ernest Borgnine on February 24, 1973. Their marriage lasted for 39 years until his death from kidney failure at age 95 on July 8, 2012.

She is the author of Being Married Happily Forever, published in 1997.

Borgnine died at her home in Pennsylvania on February 26, 2022, at the age of 80.
