= Hoover (film) =

- Directed by: Rick Pamplin
- Written by: Robert W. Fisher; Rick Pamplin
- Produced by: Robert W. Fisher; Rick Pamplin
- Starring: Ernest Borgnine
- Cinematography: Stephen F. Campbell
- Edited by: Oliver Peters
- Music by: Rick Silanskas
- Production companies: Pamplin Film; Pamplin Fisher Company
- Release date: December 25, 2000 (Los Angeles)
- Running time: 93 minutes
- Country: United States
- Language: English

Hoover is a 2000 American drama film starring Ernest Borgnine as J. Edgar Hoover.

== Cast ==
- Ernest Borgnine as J. Edgar Hoover
- Cartha DeLoach as himself
